= Definite Article (horse) =

British-bred Thoroughbred racehorse

- Sire: Indian Ridge
- Grandsire: Ahonoora
- Dam: Summer Fashion
- Damsire: Moorestyle
- Sex: Stallion
- Foaled: 20 March 1992
- Country: United Kingdom
- Colour: Bay
- Breeder: Dr D Davis
- Owner: Moyglare Stud
- Trainer: Dermot Weld
- Record: 11: 5-1-0
- Earnings: £261,472

Major wins
- National Stakes (1994); Silver Stakes (1995); Mooresbridge Stakes (1996); Tattersalls Gold Cup (1996)

Definite Article (20 March 1992 – 28 October 2014) was a British-bred, Irish-trained Thoroughbred racehorse and sire. As a two-year-old in 1994 he won a maiden race on his debut and then won the Group 1 National Stakes on his second and final start of the year. In the following year he won the Silver Stakes and was narrowly beaten in a strongly contested edition of the Irish Derby. As a four-year-old he added victories in the Mooresbridge Stakes and the Tattersalls Gold Cup. After being retired from racing at the end of the 1996 he became a successful breeding stallion, enjoying particular success as a sire of National Hunt horses.

== Background ==
Definite Article was a bay horse bred in the United Kingdom by Dr D Davis. In November 1992, the foal was put up for auction at Tattersalls and was sold for 16,000 guineas to the bloodstock agent Amanda Skiffington. As a yearling he returned to the sales ring at Tattersalls in October and was bought for 75,000 guineas by the Irish trainer Dermot Weld. He entered into the ownership of the Moyglare Stud and trained by Weld at the Curragh, County Kildare. He was ridden in all but one of his races by Mick Kinane.

His sire Indian Ridge was a top-class sprinter whose wins included the King's Stand Stakes in 1989. He later became a very successful breeding stallion whose other progeny included Ridgewood Pearl, Domedriver, Compton Place and Indian Ink. Indian Ridge was a representative of the Byerley Turk sire line, unlike more than 95% of modern thoroughbreds, who descend directly from the Darley Arabian. Definite Article's dam Summer Fashion finished second on her only race as a juvenile, but went on to win six minor races from twenty-one starts over the next two seasons. As a broodmare she also produced the Dante Stakes winner Salford Express. She was a descendant of the British broodmare Indiscretion (foaled 1932), making her a distant relative of several major winners including Rakti, Bakharoff and Holding Court.

== Racing career ==
=== 1994: two-year-old season ===
On his racecourse debut, Definite Article started the 4/6 favourite for a maiden race over eight and a half furlongs at Galway Races on 6 September and won by a length from Metastasio. Eleven days later the colt was dropped back in distance and moved up sharply in class to contest the Group 1 National Stakes over seven furlongs at the Curragh and started the 4/1 second choice in the betting behind his stablemate Desert Style (third in the Phoenix Stakes). The other three runners were Manashar, Elegant Victor and Suga Hawk and with no previous Group race winners on show, the field appeared to be a substandard one. In a closely contested finish Definite Article prevailed by half a length from Manashar, with Desert Style and Elegant Victor close behind in third and fourth.

=== 1995: three-year-old season ===
On his first appearance as a three-year-old, Definite Article was tried over ten furlongs in the Listed Silver Stakes at the Curragh on 27 May and started at odds of 4/1 in an eight-runner field. He won the race by two lengths from the odds-on favourite Shemaran (runner-up in the Derrinstown Stud Derby Trial), to whom he was conceding seven pounds in weight. In the Irish Derby over one and a half miles at the Curragh on 2 July Definite Article attempted to defend his unbeaten record and started 5/1 joint second favourite behind Celtic Swing. After being restrained by Kinane in the early stages he produced a sustained run on the outside in the straight to take the lead a furlong out but was caught on the line by the rally of the French-trained Winged Love and was beaten a short head in a photo finish. Annus Mirabilis took third ahead of Oscar Schindler and Classic Cliche with Celtic Swing finishing eighth.

Later in July the colt was sent to Germany and matched against older horses for the first time in the Group 1 Bayerisches Zuchtrennen over 2000 metres at Munich. He raced in third place for most of the way but was unable to quicken in the straight and finished fourth behind the filly Germany. Definite Article returned to Ireland for the Irish Champion Stakes over ten furlongs at Leopardstown Racecourse in September and started 6/1 third favourite behind Pentire and Hernando. He made steady progress in the straight but never looked likely to win and came home fourth behind Pentire, Freedom Cry and Flagbird, beaten two and a half lengths by the winner.

=== 1996: four-year-old season ===
Definite Article began his third campaign in the Listed Mooresbridge Stakes over ten furlongs at the Curragh on 27 April and started the 4/9 favourite against five opponents headed by the Glencairn Stakes winner Al Mohaajir. After being held up by Kinane in the early running he took the lead entering the last quarter mile and won by three-quarters of a length from Al Mohaajir, with I'm Supposin a length away in third. A Month later, over the same course and distance, the colt started 15/8 favourite for the Group 2 Tattersalls Gold Cup. His seven opponents on this occasion included Timarida, Annus Mirabilis, Al Mohaajir and River North (Aral-Pokal). He raced in third place before moving upon the outside to take the lead two furlongs from the finish. He stayed on well in the closing stages to beat Timarida by a length with a gap of three lengths back to Annus Mirabilis in third.

In July Definite Article raced in England for the first time and started 7/2 third favourite for the Eclipse Stakes over ten furlongs at Sandown Park. He was among the early leaders but faded in the last quarter mile and finished fifth of the seven runners behind Halling. In the Grosser Preis von Baden on 1 September, on what proved to be his last race in Europe, the colt finished fourth behind Pilsudski, Germany and Sunshack. For his final race Definite Article was sent to the United States and came home sixth of the ten runners behind Diplomatic Jet in the Turf Classic Invitational Stakes at Belmont Park on 5 October.

== Stud record ==
Definite Article was retired from racing to become a breeding stallion in Ireland, spending much of his stud career at the Morristown Lattin Stud near Newbridge, County Kildare. By far the best of his progeny was the outstanding stayer Vinnie Roe, while the best of his other winners on the flat included Grammarian (San Gabriel Handicap), Solid Approach (AKA Supreme Rabbit, a Grade II winner in Hong Kong), Lochbuie (Geoffrey Freer Stakes) and La Vita E Bella (Montrose Stakes). He was also very successful as a National Hunt stallion, with his offspring including Definitly Red (Many Clouds Chase), The Real Article (WKD Hurdle), Black Jack Blues (Grand National Hurdle Stakes), Non So (Racing Post Plate), Cailin Annamh (Grabel Mares Hurdle), Greenhope (Grand Annual Chase), Thesis (Top Novices' Hurdle) and Pingshou (Top Novices' Hurdle). He died on 28 October 2014.

== Sire line tree ==
- Definite Article
  - Grammarian
  - Greenhope
  - Non So
  - Thesis
  - Vinnie Roe
    - Vintage Vinnie
    - Noah And The Ark
  - Supreme Rabbit
  - Lochbuie
  - Black Jack Blues
  - The Real Article
  - Definitely Red
  - Pingshou

== Pedigree ==
Pedigree of Definite Article (GB), bay stallion, 1992
Sire Indian Ridge (IRE) 1985	Ahonoora (GB); 1975	Lorenzaccio*	Klairon
Sire Indian Ridge (IRE) 1985	Ahonoora (GB); 1975	Lorenzaccio*	Phoenissa
Sire Indian Ridge (IRE) 1985	Ahonoora (GB); 1975	Helen Nichols	Martial
Sire Indian Ridge (IRE) 1985	Ahonoora (GB); 1975	Helen Nichols	Quaker Girl
Sire Indian Ridge (IRE) 1985	Hillbrow (GB); 1975	Swing Easy	Delta Judge
Sire Indian Ridge (IRE) 1985	Hillbrow (GB); 1975	Swing Easy	Free Flowing
Sire Indian Ridge (IRE) 1985	Hillbrow (GB); 1975	Golden City	Skymaster
Sire Indian Ridge (IRE) 1985	Hillbrow (GB); 1975	Golden City	West Shaw
Dam Summer Fashion (GB) 1985	Moorestyle (GB); 1977	Manacle	Sing Sing
Dam Summer Fashion (GB) 1985	Moorestyle (GB); 1977	Manacle	Hard and Fast
Dam Summer Fashion (GB) 1985	Moorestyle (GB); 1977	Guiding Star	Reliance
Dam Summer Fashion (GB) 1985	Moorestyle (GB); 1977	Guiding Star	Star of Bethlehem
Dam Summer Fashion (GB) 1985	My Candy (GB); 1973	Lorenzaccio*	Klairon
Dam Summer Fashion (GB) 1985	My Candy (GB); 1973	Lorenzaccio*	Phoenissa
Dam Summer Fashion (GB) 1985	My Candy (GB); 1973	Candy Gift	Princely Gift
Dam Summer Fashion (GB) 1985	My Candy (GB); 1973	Candy Gift	Kandy Sauce (Family 22-d)

* Definite Article is inbred 3S x 3D to the stallion Lorenzaccio, meaning that he appears third generation on the sire side of his pedigree and third generation on the dam side of his pedigree.
