= Indian Ridge =

Irish-bred Thoroughbred racehorse

- Sire: Ahonoora
- Grandsire: Lorenzaccio
- Dam: Hillbrow
- Damsire: Swing Easy
- Sex: Stallion
- Foaled: 22 March 1985
- Country: Ireland
- Colour: Chestnut
- Breeder: Bill and Averil Whitehead
- Owner: Anne Coughlan
- Trainer: David Elsworth
- Record: 11: 5-2-0

Major wins
- Jersey Stakes (1988); Duke of York Stakes (1989); King's Stand Stakes (1989)

Indian Ridge (22 March 1985 – 17 October 2006) was an Irish-bred British Thoroughbred racehorse and sire. He showed promising but unexceptional form as a two-year-old in 1987 when he won twice from four starts in minor races. He established himself as a high-class performer by winning the Jersey Stakes on his three-year-old debut but was well beaten in his three remaining races that year. He reached his peak when dropped to sprint distances in the spring and early summer of 1989, winning the Duke of York Stakes before taking the King's Stand Stakes on his penultimate appearance.

After his retirement from racing he became a breeding stallion. Indian Ridge and his male offspring have been described as having probably the best chance of maintaining the Byerley Turk sire-line.

== Background ==
Indian Ridge was a chestnut horse with a narrow white blaze bred at the Broadfield Stud in County Kildare, Ireland by Bill and Averil Whitehead. As a yearling he was put up for auction and sold for 12,000 Irish guineas, entering the ownership of Anne Coughlan. He was sent into training with David Elsworth at Whitsbury in Hampshire.

He was sired by Ahonoora a sprinter, whose other offspring included Dr Devious, Park Appeal, Don't Forget Me and Park Express. Ahonoora was a representative of the Byerley Turk sire line, unlike more than 95% of modern thoroughbreds, who descend directly from the Darley Arabian. By the time of Indian Ridge's racing career the Byerley Turk line, once one of the most important in the Thoroughbred breed, had dwindled in significance, with Ahonoora and his male descendants being regarded as by far its best chance of survival.

Indian Ridge's dam Hillbrow showed good form as a two-year-old in 1977 when she won twice from six starts and was rated 100 by Timeform. She was disappointing in the following season and was sold at auction for 3,300 guineas in December 1978. She was descended from the broodmare Irish Candy, a half-sister to the Irish Derby winner Fraise du Bois.

== Racing career ==
=== 1987: two-year-old season ===
Indian Ridge finished second in a five furlong maiden race and then finished second in a similar event over six furlongs. He recorded his first success in a minor six-furlong race at Goodwood Racecourse on 29 September and followed up with another win at Leicester three weeks later. In both of his wins he took the lead early and led for most of the way. At the end of the season the independent Timeform organisation gave him a rating of 93, 34 pounds behind their best two-year-old Warning

=== 1988: three-year-old season ===
After missing the early part of 1988, Indian Ridge made his debut as a three-year-old in the Group Three Jersey Stakes over seven furlongs at Royal Ascot on 15 June. The Henry Cecil-trained Salse (winner of the Somerville Tattersall Stakes) started favourite ahead of Rawnak (King Charles II Stakes) and Intimidate (third in the Irish 2,000 Guineas) with Indian Ridge the 10/1 fourth choice in a twelve-runner field. Ridden by Cash Asmussen, he took the lead from the start and was never headed, staying on well in the closing stages to win by one and a half lengths from Salse, with three lengths back to Hibernian Gold in third.

Indian Ridge failed to reproduce his Royal Ascot form in three subsequent races that year. He started second favourite for the July Cup at Newmarket Racecourse on 7 July but after briefly taking the lead he faded to finish eighth of the nine runners behind Soviet Star. He finished sixth to Salse in the Hungerford Stakes at Newbury in August and ended his season in the Queen Elizabeth II Stakes at Ascot on 24 September. Starting a 66/1 outsider in his first and only run over one mile he led in the early stages but weakened in the straight and finished sixth of the eight runners behind Warning.

=== 1989: four-year-old season ===
Indian Ridge returned as a four-year-old in the Duke of York Stakes (then a Group Three Race) over six furlongs at York Racecourse on 18 May 1989 in which he was ridden by Steve Cauthen. He was made the 7/2 favourite, with the best fancied of his nine opponents being Point of Light (Abernant Stakes), Gallic League and Handsome Sailor. After racing in second place he took the lead a furlong from the finish and won by one and a half lengths from Gallic League despite hanging to the left in the closing stages.

Cauthen was again in the saddle when Indian Ridge appeared for the second time at Royal Ascot and started the 9/4 favourite in a fourteen-runner field for the Group Two King's Stand Stakes over five furlongs on 23 June. Gallic League and Handsome Sailor were again in opposition while the other runners included Cadeaux Genereux, Kerrera (runner-up in the 1000 Guineas), Carols Treasure (Windsor Castle Stakes), Astronef (Premio Melton), Shuttlecock Corner (Flying Childers Stakes) and Perion (Palace House Stakes). Indian Ridge was among the leaders from the start, went to the front two furlongs from the finish and held on in the final strides to win by a neck and a head from Tigani and Gallic League. On 6 August the colt was sent to France and moved back up in distance for the Prix Maurice de Gheest over 1300 metres at Deauville Racecourse but made little impact and finished fifth of the nine runners, beaten five lengths by the winner Cricket Ball.

== Stud record ==
Indian Ridge was retired from racing at the end of the 1989 season and became a breeding stallion. He was initially based at the Campbell Stud in Suffolk but later moved to the Irish National Stud. He was a very successful sire of winners, with his progeny winning at the highest level in Ireland, France, the United Kingdom, Germany, Italy, the United States and Canada. He died at the Irish National Stud on 17 October 2006 after apparently suffering a heart attack.

Major winners

c = colt, f = filly, g = gelding

Foaled	Name	Sex	Major wins
1992	Ridgewood Pearl	f	Irish 1,000 Guineas, Coronation Stakes, Prix du Moulin, Breeders' Cup Mile
1992	Definite Article	c	National Stakes
1994	Compton Place	c	July Cup
1996	Namid	c	Prix de l'Abbaye
1998	Domedriver	c	Breeders' Cup Mile
2000	Indian Haven	c	Irish 2,000 Guineas
2001	Relaxed Gesture	c	Canadian International Stakes
2002	Linngari	c	Bayerisches Zuchtrennen Premio Vittorio di Capua
2004	Daytona	g	Shoemaker Mile Stakes
2004	Indian Ink	f	Cheveley Park Stakes, Coronation Stakes

== Sire line tree ==
- Indian Ridge
  - Island Magic
  - Ridgewood Ben
  - Definite Article
    - Grammarian
    - Greenhope
    - Non So
    - Thesis
    - Vinnie Roe
      - Vintage Vinnie
      - Noah And The Ark
    - Supreme Rabbit
    - Lochbuie
    - Black Jack Blues
    - The Real Article
    - Definitely Red
    - Pingshou
  - Kierkegaard
  - Compton Place
    - Boogie Street
    - Borderlescott
    - Intrepid Jack
    - Godfrey Street
    - Prolific
    - Deacon Blues
    - Fortune Knight
    - Pearl Secret
  - Handsome Ridge
  - Indian Rocket
    - Captain Chop
  - Namid
    - Blue Dakota
    - Resplendent Glory
    - Morgan Drive
    - Total Gallery
  - Luna Ridge
  - Nicobar
    - Dunaden
  - Domedriver
    - Domeside
  - High Pitched
  - Indian Creek
  - Munir
    - Mariol
  - Sights On Gold
  - Indian Haven
    - Asram
    - Beachfire
  - Imperial Stride
  - Relaxed Gesture
  - Sleeping Indian
  - Snow Ridge
  - Tahreeb
  - Linngari
  - Sunday's Brunch
  - Daytona
  - Luck Money
  - Patkai
  - Libano
  - Rayeni
  - Rosendhal

== Pedigree ==
Pedigree of Indian Ridge (IRE), chestnut stallion, 1985
Sire Ahonoora (GB) 1975	Lorenzaccio (GB); 1965	Klairon	Clarion
Sire Ahonoora (GB) 1975	Lorenzaccio (GB); 1965	Klairon	Kalmia
Sire Ahonoora (GB) 1975	Lorenzaccio (GB); 1965	Phoenissa	The Phoenix
Sire Ahonoora (GB) 1975	Lorenzaccio (GB); 1965	Phoenissa	Erica Fragrans
Sire Ahonoora (GB) 1975	Helen Nichols (GB); 1966	Martial	Hill Gail
Sire Ahonoora (GB) 1975	Helen Nichols (GB); 1966	Martial	Discipliner*
Sire Ahonoora (GB) 1975	Helen Nichols (GB); 1966	Quaker Girl	Whistler
Sire Ahonoora (GB) 1975	Helen Nichols (GB); 1966	Quaker Girl	Mayflower
Dam Hillbrow (GB) 1975	Swing Easy (USA); 1968	Delta Judge	Traffic Judge
Dam Hillbrow (GB) 1975	Swing Easy (USA); 1968	Delta Judge	Beautillion
Dam Hillbrow (GB) 1975	Swing Easy (USA); 1968	Free Flowing	Polynesian
Dam Hillbrow (GB) 1975	Swing Easy (USA); 1968	Free Flowing	Rytina
Dam Hillbrow (GB) 1975	Golden City (GB); 1970	Skymaster	Golden Cloud
Dam Hillbrow (GB) 1975	Golden City (GB); 1970	Skymaster	Discipliner*
Dam Hillbrow (GB) 1975	Golden City (GB); 1970	West Shaw	Grey Sovereign
Dam Hillbrow (GB) 1975	Golden City (GB); 1970	West Shaw	Irish Candy (Family: 3-e)

* Indian Ridge is inbred 4S x 4D to the stallion Discipliner, meaning that he appears fourth generation on the sire side of his pedigree and fourth generation on the dam side of his pedigree.
