= Summoner (horse) =

British-bred Thoroughbred racehorse

- Sire: Inchinor
- Grandsire: Ahonoora
- Dam: Sumoto
- Damsire: Mtoto
- Sex: Gelding
- Foaled: 2 March 1997
- Country: United Kingdom
- Colour: Bay
- Breeder: Hascombe & Valiant Studs
- Owner: Michael Pescod; Godolphin; Haya of Jordan
- Trainer: Roger Charlton; Saeed bin Suroor; Ali Rashid Al Rayhi
- Record: 25: 6-3-1
- Earnings: £258,625

Major wins
- Queen Elizabeth II Stakes (2001)

Summoner (foaled 2 March 1997) was a British-bred Thoroughbred racehorse best known for his upset win in the 2001 Queen Elizabeth II Stakes. In his early career the horse showed good, but unexceptional form, winning four races but looking to be overmatched when tried against top class opposition. In the Queen Elizabeth II Stakes he was employed as a pacemaker but after he established a big lead his more fancied opponents were unable to catch him and he won at odds of 33/1. He later raced with little success in the United Arab Emirates and was gelded at the end of his racing career.

== Background ==
Summoner was a bay horse bred in England by Anthony Oppenheimer's Hascombe and Valiant Stud. In December 1998 the yearling was offered for sale at Tattersalls and bought for 50,000 guineas by the bloodstock agent Amanda Skiffington. He entered the ownership of Michael Pescod and was sent into training with Roger Charlton at Beckhampton in Wiltshire.

As a son of the Hungerford Stakes winner Inchinor, Summoner was a representative of the Byerley Turk sire line, unlike more than 95% of modern thoroughbreds, who descend directly from the Darley Arabian. Inchinor, who died in 2003, sired over five hundred other winners including Notnowcato, the Prix de Diane winner Latice and the sprinter Cape of Good Hope. Summoner's dam Sumoto won two of her six races, before becoming a successful broodmare whose other foals included Compton Admiral, Twyla Tharp (dam of The Fugue) and So Admirable (grand-dam of Limato).

== Racing career ==
=== 1999: two-year-old season ===
On his racecourse debut Summoner contested a maiden race for two-year-olds over six furlongs on good to firm ground at Lingfield Park Racecourse on 25 August in which he started at odds of 7/1 and finished sixth of the sixteen runners. On 6 November the colt started at 8/1 in a similar event on soft ground at Doncaster Racecourse in which he was ridden by Richard Hughes. He led from the start went clear of his opponents and won by three lengths from Royal Cavalier despite being eased down by Hughes in the closing stages.

=== 2000: three-year-old season ===
Summoner began his second season in a minor race over one mile at Doncaster on 25 March in which he was ridden by Seb Sanders. Starting the 9/2 third choice in a nine-runner field he took the lead approaching the final furlong and drew away to win by three lengths from the favourite Zyz. The colt was then stepped up sharply in class for the 2000 Guineas over the Rowley Mile at Newmarket on 6 May in which he started a 25/1 outsider and came home ninth of the 27 runners behind King's Best.

After a break of two months he returned in a minor race over one mile at Sandown Park on 7 July and finished fourth. Twelve days later he contested a similar event at Doncaster in which he was ridden by Hughes and stated the 7/1 third favourite behind the Henry Cecil-trained Pythio who had won the Britannia Stakes in 1999. Summoner took the lead approaching the last quarter mile and stayed on well to win by two lengths from Pythios. On 5 August the colt was moved back up in class and started the 11/10 favourite for the Listed Thoroughbred Stakes at Goodwood Racecourse. He took the lead two furlongs out and opened up a clear lead but was caught in the final strides and beaten a neck by Adilabad.

At the end of the year Summoner was bought by Sheikh Mohammed's Godolphin organisation and was transferred to the training stable of Saeed bin Suroor.

=== 2001: four-year-old season ===
On his first run as a four-year-old Summoner was tried over ten furlongs for the first time in a minor race at Doncaster on 9 June. Partnered by Darryll Holland he started at odds of 1/3 and came home four lengths clear of his rivals, having taken the lead three furlongs out. After an absence of almost three months he returned to the track for the Listed Strensall Stakes over nine furlongs at York Racecourse on 9 September. Starting the 15/8 favourite he led for most of the way but was caught inside the final furlong and beaten a neck by Momentum.

The Queen Elizabeth II Stakes over one mile on rain-softened ground at Ascot Racecourse on 29 September attracted a field of eight runners. Summoner, who started the 33/1 outsider and was ridden by Richard Hills, had not been among the original entries for the contest and was supplemented for a fee of £25,000 to act as a pacemaker for his stablemate Noverre, the 2/1 favourite. The other runners were Vahorimix (Poule d'Essai des Pouliches, Prix Jacques le Marois), Proudwings (Falmouth Stakes), Bach (Royal Whip Stakes), Hawkeye (Desmond Stakes), Tamburlaine (second in the 2000 Guineas) and Bocelli (Singapore Derby). He was ridden by Richard Hills who had created a huge upset in the race seven years earlier when he rode the supposed pacemaker Maroof to victory at 66/1. Hills sent Summoner to the front from the start and quickly opened up a big lead, leading to comments that he had failed in his pacemaker role as he had been ignored by the other jockeys. Entering the straight he was still six lengths clear of his rivals and showed no signs of weakening. Although his lead was steadily reduced in the closing stages he never appeared to be in any danger of defeat and came home two lengths in front of Noverre.

According to the Irish Independent the result was greeted by a "collective gasp of disbelief" from the Ascot crowd followed by a "multiple scratching of heads". Noverre's jockey Frankie Dettori claimed that "the only thing that beat me was the rain" but received a warning for excessive use of the whip. Godolphin's racing manager Simon Crisford commented "The whole idea of pacemakers is, if you don't follow the pacemaker, the pacemaker wins because we have quality pacemakers... [Dettori] said he was close enough, but [Summoner] was going too fast for him". Richard Hills said "It's great. I had it my own way and I had a good horse underneath me. I thought, in this ground, it's going to be hard to come off the pace."

=== 2002: five-year-old season ===
Summoner began his fourth season with two races in March over 1800 metresat Nad Al Sheba Racecourse in Dubai. He finished sixth to Divine Task in the Jebel Hatta and ninth behind Terre A Terre in the Dubai Duty Free. On his return to Europe he started a 16/1 outsider for the Lockinge Stakes at Newbury Racecourse and came home last of the ten runner behind Keltos.

=== Later career ===
Summoner was off the course for two and a half years before returning in November 2004. By this time his ownership had passed to Sheikh Mohammed's wife Princess Haya and he was being trained in Abu Dhabi by Ali Rashid Al Rayhi. On his second start for his new connection he won the Listed First Gulf Bank National Day Cup on 19 December but he failed to win in ten subsequent races. On his last racecourse appearance he finished eleventh of the twelve runners in the Al Fahidi Fort in February 2006. He was subsequently gelded.

== Pedigree ==
Pedigree of Summoner (GB), bay gelding, 1997
Sire Inchinor (GB) 1990	Ahonoora (GB); 1975	Lorenzaccio	Klairon (FR)
Sire Inchinor (GB) 1990	Ahonoora (GB); 1975	Lorenzaccio	Phoenissa
Sire Inchinor (GB) 1990	Ahonoora (GB); 1975	Helen Nichols	Martial (IRE)
Sire Inchinor (GB) 1990	Ahonoora (GB); 1975	Helen Nichols	Quaker Girl
Sire Inchinor (GB) 1990	Inchmurrin (IRE); 1985	Lomond (USA)	Northern Dancer (CAN)
Sire Inchinor (GB) 1990	Inchmurrin (IRE); 1985	Lomond (USA)	My Charmer
Sire Inchinor (GB) 1990	Inchmurrin (IRE); 1985	On Show (GB)	Welsh Pageant (FR)
Sire Inchinor (GB) 1990	Inchmurrin (IRE); 1985	On Show (GB)	African Dancer
Dam Sumoto (GB) 1990	Mtoto (GB); 1983	Busted	Crepello
Dam Sumoto (GB) 1990	Mtoto (GB); 1983	Busted	Sans le Sou (IRE)
Dam Sumoto (GB) 1990	Mtoto (GB); 1983	Amazer (FR)	Mincio
Dam Sumoto (GB) 1990	Mtoto (GB); 1983	Amazer (FR)	Alzara (GB)
Dam Sumoto (GB) 1990	Soemba (GB); 1983	General Assembly (USA)	Secretariat
Dam Sumoto (GB) 1990	Soemba (GB); 1983	General Assembly (USA)	Exclusive Dancer
Dam Sumoto (GB) 1990	Soemba (GB); 1983	Seven Seas (FR)	Riverman (USA)
Dam Sumoto (GB) 1990	Soemba (GB); 1983	Seven Seas (FR)	Ya Ya (IRE) (Family:7-a)
