= Lorenzaccio (horse) =

British-bred Thoroughbred racehorse

- Sire: Klairon
- Grandsire: Clarion
- Dam: Phoenissa
- Damsire: The Phoenix
- Sex: Stallion
- Foaled: 1965
- Country: United Kingdom
- Colour: Chestnut
- Breeder: A D D Rogers
- Owner: Charles St George
- Trainer: Noel Murless
- Record: 24:7-6-4

Major wins
- July Stakes (1967); Prix Jean Prat (1968); Prix Quincey (1969); Prix Foy (1969); Champion Stakes (1969)

Awards
- Timeform rating 130

Lorenzaccio (1965–1983) was a British Thoroughbred racehorse and sire. As a racehorse he was best known for his upset victory over the Triple Crown winner Nijinsky in the 1970 running of the Champion Stakes. In four years of racing he also won the July Stakes, Prix Jean Prat, Prix Quincey and Prix Foy as well as being placed in several other important races. At stud, he was best known as the sire of the outstanding breeding stallion Ahonoora.

== Background ==
Lorenzaccio was a chestnut horse standing 16.1 hands high bred by Captain A D Rogers. His sire Klairon was a top-class racehorse whose win included the Poule d'Essai des Poulains in 1955. Apart from Lorenzaccio, he sired the Ascot Gold Cup winner Shangamuzo and Prix Jacques Le Marois winner Luthier. Klairon was a representative of the Byerley Turk sire line, unlike more than 95% of modern thoroughbreds, who descend directly from the Darley Arabian. Lorenzaccio's dam Phoenissa, was a moderate racehorse but was a half-sister of the Man o' War Stakes winner Tudor Era. As a granddaughter of the broodmare Jennydang, Phoenissa as also closely related to the Irish St Leger winners Barclay and Christmas Island, the Japanese classic winners Miss Onward and Chitose-O and the July Cup winner Thatching.

Lorenzaccio was acquired by Charles St George, the chairman of Lloyd's of London and sent into training with Noel Murless at his Warren Place in Newmarket, Suffolk. During Lorenzaccio's time with Murless, the trainer won his sixth, seventh and eighth British trainers' championships.

== Racing career ==
=== 1967–1969: earlier career ===
As a two-year-old, Lorenzaccio was highly tried, running in several of the most important races for juveniles in England and France. He recorded his only success in the July Stakes over six furlongs at Newmarket Racecourse. Ridden by the Australian jockey George Moore, he started at odds of 5/1 and won from the filly Last Shoe. The colt then travelled to France where he finished third to Zeddaan in the Prix Robert Papin at Maisons-Laffitte Racecourse in July and second to Madina in the Prix Morny at Deauville in August. In autumn he returned to Britain, where he ran twice at Doncaster Racecourse finishing second to Cheb's Lad in the Champagne Stakes and fourth behind Vaguely Noble in the Observer Gold Cup. In 1968, Lorenzaccio's best performance came in France, when he became the first foreign-trained horse to win the Prix Jean Prat over 1800 metres at Chantilly Racecourse. In Britain he finished third behind World Cup and Wolver Hollow in the Queen Elizabeth II Stakes at Ascot Racecourse in September. Lorenzaccio failed to win as a four-year-old in 1969, but ran well in several major races. At Royal Ascot in June he finished second to Kamundu when carrying top weight in the Royal Hunt Cup. In September he ran in La Coupe de Maisons-Laffitte, and finished second to Karabas, a horse who went on to win that year's Washington, D.C. International Stakes. At Newmarket in October he finished third to Flossy and Park Top in the ten furlong Champion Stakes.

=== 1970: five-year-old season ===
Lorenzaccio reached his peak as a five-year-old in 1970 when he was mainly campaigned in France. In the early part of the season he won the Prix Prince Chevalier over 2000m and the Prix de Fuilleuse over 1600m, both at Saint-Cloud Racecourse. In August he was ridden by Lester Piggott as he defeated Monticello and Prudent Miss to win the Prix Quincey over 1600m at Deauville. In September, Lorenzaccio was moved up in distance to contest the Prix Fox over 2200m at Longchamp Racecourse. He was again ridden by Piggott and won from the Gran Premio di Milano winner Beaugency and the leading German filly Schonbrunn (winner of the Preis der Diana and Grand Prix de Deauville). On his last European start Lorenzaccio ran in his second Champion Stakes at Newmarket in October. The favourite was the outstanding three-year-old colt Nijinsky, who had become the first Triple Crown winner for thirty-five years and beaten older horses in the King George VI and Queen Elizabeth Stakes. Although he had been narrowly beaten by Sassafras in the Prix de l'Arc de Triomphe, Nijinsky, ridden by Piggott, was expected to redeem his reputation and started at odds of 4/11 while Lorenzaccio, ridden by Geoff Lewis was a 100/7 outsider. In what was considered a huge upset, Lorenzaccio took the lead in the final quarter mile and stayed on strongly to hold off the challenge of Nijinsky to win by three-quarters of a length. Lorenzaccio's connections then accepted an invitation to run in the Washington, D.C. International Stakes at Laurel Park Racecourse. Racing over one and a half miles, he finished fifth behind the American Turf champion Fort Marcy.

== Assessment ==
In 1970, the independent Timeform organisation gave Lorenzaccio a peak rating of 130, eight pounds behind Nijinsky and three behind the top-rated older horse Balidar.

== Stud career ==
Lorenzaccio was retired from racing to become a breeding stallion. He was not considered a great success and was exported to Australia in 1977, where he died in 1983, at the Dawson Stud near Cootamundra, New South Wales. It was after Lorenzaccio had left Europe that his son, Ahonoora, emerged as a leading sprinter, winning the William Hill Sprint Championship in 1979. Ahonoora went on become an exceptional breeding stallion, siring Park Appeal, Park Express, Don't Forget Me, Indian Ridge (King's Stand Stakes, leading sire), Dr Devious and Inchinor (sire of Notnowcato). Ahonoora is largely responsible for the survival of the Byerley Turk sireline at the highest level in Europe.

Lorenzaccio's other notable winner included the three time American steeplechase champion Zaccio and the Victoria Derby winner Brewery Boy.

== Sire line tree ==
- Lorenzaccio
  - My Klaire Berry
  - Ahonoora
    - Leysh
    - Nashamaa
      - Cool Edge
    - Don't Forget Me
      - Irish Memory
      - My Memoirs
      - Insatiable
        - Remember Rose
      - Rudy's Pet
      - Wild Eagle
    - Indian Ridge
      - Island Magic
      - Ridgewood Ben
      - Definite Article
        - Grammarian
        - Greenhope
        - Non So
        - Thesis
        - Vinnie Roe
        - Supreme Rabbit
        - Lochbuie
        - Black Jack Blues
        - The Real Article
        - Definitely Red
        - Pingshou
      - Kierkegaard
      - Compton Place
        - Boogie Street
        - Borderlescott
        - Intrepid Jack
        - Godfrey Street
        - Prolific
        - Deacon Blues
        - Fortune Knight
        - Pearl Secret
      - Handsome Ridge
      - Indian Rocket
        - Captain Chop
      - Namid
        - Blue Dakota
        - Resplendent Glory
        - Morgan Drive
        - Total Gallery
      - Luna Ridge
      - Nicobar
        - Dunaden
      - Domedriver
        - Domeside
      - High Pitched
      - Indian Creek
      - Munir
        - Mariol
      - Sights On Gold
      - Indian Haven
        - Asram
        - Beachfire
      - Imperial Stride
      - Relaxed Gesture
      - Sleeping Indian
      - Snow Ridge
      - Tahreeb
      - Linngari
      - Sunday's Brunch
      - Daytona
      - Luck Money
      - Patkai
      - Libano
      - Rayeni
      - Rosendhal
    - Project Manager
    - Statoblest
      - I Cried For You
    - Armanasco
    - Topanoora
    - Additional Risk
    - Sbarlusc
    - Ball Park
    - Dr Devious
      - Collier Hill
      - Day Walker
    - Idris
    - Inchinor
      - Summonor
      - Umistim
      - Bannister
      - Beauchamp Pilot
      - Cape of Good Hope
      - Orientor
      - On The Acorn
      - Notnowcato
        - Custom Cut
        - Fast Or Free
        - Long Dog
        - Redkirk Warrior
      - Satchem
      - Yasoodd
    - Visto Si Stampi
  - Rolle
  - Zaccio
  - Brewery Boy

== Pedigree ==
Pedigree of Lorenzaccio (GB), chestnut stallion, 1965
Sire Klairon (FR) 1952	Clarion (FR); 1944	Djebel	Tourbillon
Sire Klairon (FR) 1952	Clarion (FR); 1944	Djebel	Loika
Sire Klairon (FR) 1952	Clarion (FR); 1944	Columba	Colorado
Sire Klairon (FR) 1952	Clarion (FR); 1944	Columba	Gay Bird
Sire Klairon (FR) 1952	Kalmia (FR); 1931	Kantar	Alcantara
Sire Klairon (FR) 1952	Kalmia (FR); 1931	Kantar	Karabe
Sire Klairon (FR) 1952	Kalmia (FR); 1931	Sweet Lavender	Swynford
Sire Klairon (FR) 1952	Kalmia (FR); 1931	Sweet Lavender	Marchetta
Dam Phoenissa (GB) 1951	The Phoenix (GB); 1940	Chateau Bouscaut	Kircubbin
Dam Phoenissa (GB) 1951	The Phoenix (GB); 1940	Chateau Bouscaut	Ramondie
Dam Phoenissa (GB) 1951	The Phoenix (GB); 1940	Fille de Poete	Firdaussi
Dam Phoenissa (GB) 1951	The Phoenix (GB); 1940	Fille de Poete	Fille d'Amour
Dam Phoenissa (GB) 1951	Erica Fragrans (GB); 1946	Big Game	Bahram
Dam Phoenissa (GB) 1951	Erica Fragrans (GB); 1946	Big Game	Myrobella
Dam Phoenissa (GB) 1951	Erica Fragrans (GB); 1946	Jennydang	Colombo
Dam Phoenissa (GB) 1951	Erica Fragrans (GB); 1946	Jennydang	Dalmary (Family 5-h)
