= Ahonoora =

British Thoroughbred racehorse

- Sire: Lorenzaccio
- Grandsire: Klairon
- Dam: Helen Nichols
- Damsire: Martial
- Sex: Stallion
- Foaled: 1975
- Country: United Kingdom
- Colour: Chestnut
- Breeder: Wyld Court Stud
- Owner: Essa Alkhalifa
- Trainer: Brian Swift; Frankie Durr
- Record: 16:7-7-0
- Earnings: £86,587

Major wins
- Stewards's Cup (1978); King George Stakes (1979); William Hill Sprint Championship (1979)

Ahonoora (1975–1989) was a British Thoroughbred racehorse and sire. In a career that lasted from 1977 to 1979 he ran sixteen times and won seven races. Ahonoora was a sprinter who specialised in races over five and six furlongs, with his most important wins coming in the Stewards's Cup at Goodwood and the Group Two William Hill Sprint Championship (now a Group One race) at York. He is primarily notable for his achievements at stud, where his progeny, including Dr Devious, Park Express and Indian Ridge, made him one of the most significant modern representatives of the Byerley Turk sire line.

== Background ==
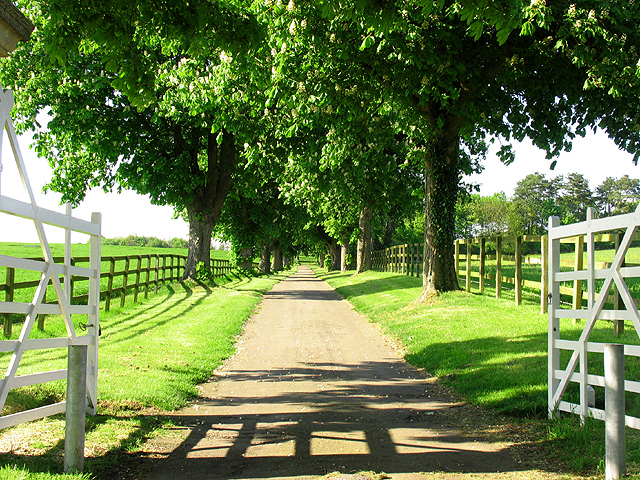
The entrance to Wyld Court Stud, where Ahonoora was foaled.

Ahonoora was bred in England by the Wyld Court Stud near the village of Hampstead Norreys in Berkshire and sold as a yearling for 7,600 guineas to Essa Alkhalifa.

His sire, Lorenzaccio was a high-class racehorse who won the July Stakes and the Prix Jean Prat in his early career, but was principally famous for his defeat of the Triple Crown winner Nijinsky as a five-year-old in the 1970 Champion Stakes.

== Racing career ==
Ahonoora was sent into training with Brian Swift at Loretta Lodge, Epsom. As a three-year-old, Ahonoora recorded his first major win when he took the Strewards' Cup as a 50/1 outsider.

As a four-year-old, Ahonoora moved to the Fitzroy stable of Frankie Durr at Newmarket, Suffolk and made a successful transition from handicaps to Conditions races. In spring he finished second to Double Form in the Temple Stakes at Sandown and in June he was second again to the same horse in the King's Stand Stakes at Royal Ascot. He returned to Goodwood to win the Group Three King George Stakes in July. In August he recorded his most important success when he was awarded the William Hill Sprint Championship at York on the disqualification of Thatching. In September he finished second to Double Form for the third time in the Vernons Sprint Cup at Haydock.

== Stud career ==
Ahonoora was retired to the Irish National Stud in 1980 at a fee of £2,250. He soon exceeded all expectations, and, despite his racing career as a pure sprinter, he proved capable of siring top class performers at a wide range of distances. Ahonoora proved to be one of the most successful and important representatives of the Byerley Turk line in the modern era. His notable winners include:

- Park Appeal (1982)- Cheveley Park Stakes
- Park Express (1983)- Irish Champion Stakes
- Don't Forget Me (1984)- 2000 Guineas
- Indian Ridge (1985)- King's Stand Stakes, leading sire of Compton Place, Domedriver, Indian Haven, Namid, Sleeping Indian, Linngari, Ridgewood Pearl and Indian Ink
- Ruby Tiger (1987)- E. P. Taylor Stakes
- Dr Devious (1989)- Epsom Derby, sire of Collier Hill and Kinnaird.
- Inchinor (1990)- sire of Notnowcato and Orientor

He is the damsire of:

- New Approach (2005)- Epsom Derby, sire of Dawn Approach
- Cape Cross (1994)- sire of Sea The Stars, Ouija Board, Golden Horn and Awtaad.
- Azeri (1998)- Breeders' Cup Distaff
- Leroidesanimaux (2000)- sire of Animal Kingdom
- Acclamation (1999) - sire of Dark Angel, Equiano, Marsha and Harbour Watch

In 1989, Ahonoora was bought by the Coolmore Stud. He was shuttled to stand in Australia for the southern hemisphere breeding season. He died after sustaining a broken hind leg in a paddock accident at Segenhoe Stud in the Hunter Valley, Australia on 14 October 1989.

== Sire line tree ==
- Ahonoora
  - Leysh
  - Nashamaa
    - Cool Edge
  - Don't Forget Me
    - Irish Memory
    - My Memoirs
    - Insatiable
      - Remember Rose
    - Rudy's Pet
    - Wild Eagle
  - Indian Ridge
    - Island Magic
    - Ridgewood Ben
    - Definite Article
      - Grammarian
      - Greenhope
      - Non So
      - Thesis
      - Vinnie Roe
        - Vintage Vinnie
        - Noah And The Ark
      - Supreme Rabbit
      - Lochbuie
      - Black Jack Blues
      - The Real Article
      - Definitely Red
      - Pingshou
    - Kierkegaard
    - Compton Place
      - Boogie Street
      - Borderlescott
      - Intrepid Jack
      - Godfrey Street
      - Prolific
      - Deacon Blues
      - Fortune Knight
      - Pearl Secret
    - Handsome Ridge
    - Indian Rocket
      - Captain Chop
    - Namid
      - Blue Dakota
      - Resplendent Glory
      - Morgan Drive
      - Total Gallery
    - Luna Ridge
    - Nicobar
      - Dunaden
    - Domedriver
      - Domeside
    - High Pitched
    - Indian Creek
    - Munir
      - Mariol
    - Sights On Gold
    - Indian Haven
      - Asram
      - Beachfire
    - Imperial Stride
    - Relaxed Gesture
    - Sleeping Indian
    - Snow Ridge
    - Tahreeb
    - Linngari
    - Sunday's Brunch
    - Daytona
    - Luck Money
    - Patkai
    - Libano
    - Rayeni
    - Rosendhal
  - Project Manager
  - Statoblest
    - I Cried For You
  - Armanasco
  - Topanoora
  - Additional Risk
  - Sbarlusc
  - Ball Park
  - Dr Devious
    - Collier Hill
    - Day Walker
  - Idris
  - Inchinor
    - Summonor
    - Umistim
    - Bannister
    - Beauchamp Pilot
    - Cape of Good Hope
    - Orientor
    - On The Acorn
    - Notnowcato
      - Custom Cut
      - Fast Or Free
      - Long Dog
      - Redkirk Warrior
    - Satchem
    - Yasoodd
  - Visto Si Stampi

== Pedigree ==
Pedigree of Ahonoora (GB), chestnut stallion, 1975
Sire Lorenzaccio (GB) 1965	Klairon; 1952	Clarion III	Djebel
Sire Lorenzaccio (GB) 1965	Klairon; 1952	Clarion III	Columba
Sire Lorenzaccio (GB) 1965	Klairon; 1952	Kalmia	Kantar
Sire Lorenzaccio (GB) 1965	Klairon; 1952	Kalmia	Sweet Lavender
Sire Lorenzaccio (GB) 1965	Phoenissa; 1951	The Phoenix	Chateau Bouscaut
Sire Lorenzaccio (GB) 1965	Phoenissa; 1951	The Phoenix	Fille de Poete
Sire Lorenzaccio (GB) 1965	Phoenissa; 1951	Erica Fragrans	Big Game
Sire Lorenzaccio (GB) 1965	Phoenissa; 1951	Erica Fragrans	Jennydang
Dam Helen Nichols(GB) 1966	Martial; 1957	Hill Gail	Bull Lea
Dam Helen Nichols(GB) 1966	Martial; 1957	Hill Gail	Jane Gail
Dam Helen Nichols(GB) 1966	Martial; 1957	Discipliner	Court Martial
Dam Helen Nichols(GB) 1966	Martial; 1957	Discipliner	Edvina
Dam Helen Nichols(GB) 1966	Quaker Girl; 1961	Whistler	Panorama
Dam Helen Nichols(GB) 1966	Quaker Girl; 1961	Whistler	Farthing Damages
Dam Helen Nichols(GB) 1966	Quaker Girl; 1961	Mayflower	Borealis
Dam Helen Nichols(GB) 1966	Quaker Girl; 1961	Mayflower	Foliage (Family:1-m)
