= Indian Haven =

British-bred Thoroughbred racehorse (2000–2023)

- Sire: Indian Ridge
- Grandsire: Ahonoora
- Dam: Madame Dubois
- Damsire: Legend of France
- Sex: Stallion
- Foaled: 21 February 2000
- Died: 11 July 2023 (aged 23)
- Country: United Kingdom
- Colour: Chestnut
- Breeder: Cliveden Stud
- Owner: Fountain Racing; Peter Gleeson, Julian Smith & Loz Conway
- Trainer: Paul D'Arcy
- Record: 12: 3-0-0
- Earnings: £173,166

Major wins
- European Free Handicap (2003); Irish 2,000 Guineas (2003)

Awards
- Timeform rating 119 (2003)

Indian Haven (21 February 2000 – 11 July 2023) was a British Thoroughbred racehorse and sire best known for his win in the 2003 running of the Irish 2,000 Guineas. After winning a minor race on his debut, he was well-beaten in better company on his three remaining starts and appeared to be some way behind the best of his generation. In the spring of 2003 he showed improved form, taking the European Free Handicap and coming back after an unlucky run in the 2000 Guineas to win the Irish equivalent. He was never able to reproduce his classic-winning form and was well beaten in five subsequent races. After his retirement from racing, he stood as a breeding stallion in Ireland and the United Kingdom.

== Background ==
Indian Haven was a chestnut horse with a white blaze standing 16.3 hands high bred in England by the late Louis Freedman's Cliveden Stud in Berkshire. As a yearling he was offered for sale at Tattersalls in October 2001 and was bought for 62,000 guineas by the trainer Paul D'Arcy. The colt entered the ownership of the Fountain Racing syndicate and was taken into training by D'Arcy at his High Havens stable in Newmarket.

His sire Indian Ridge was a top-class sprinter whose wins included the King's Stand Stakes in 1989. He later became a very successful breeding stallion whose other progeny included Ridgewood Pearl, Domedriver, Compton Place and Indian Ink. Indian Ridge was a representative of the Byerley Turk sire line, unlike more than 95% of modern thoroughbreds, who descend directly from the Darley Arabian. Indian Haven's dam Madame Dubois was a successful racemare who excelled over long distances, winning the Park Hill Stakes and the Prix de Royallieu as a three-year-old in 1990. As a broodmare, she produced several other winners including the Gran Criterium winner Count Dubois. She was descended from the Irish broodmare No Angel (foaled 1949) who was the female-line ancestor of Kris and Diesis.

== Racing career ==
=== 2002: two-year-old season ===
Indian Haven made his racecourse debut in a six furlong maiden race at Yarmouth Racecourse on 3 July in which he was ridden by John Egan and started at odds of 9/4 against five opponents. He took the lead in the last quarter mile and "forged clear" in the closing stages to win by two lengths from Magic Red and Arousha. In his next three races Indian Haven was moved up in class to contest Group races and failed to win. He finished sixth to Country Reel in the Gimcrack Stakes at York in August (after being badly hampered) and fifth to Almushahar in the Champagne Stakes at Doncaster in September before ending his season by running unplaced as a 40/1 outsider for the Dewhurst Stakes at Newmarket on 19 October.

Ten days after his run in the Dewhurst, the colt was auctioned for the second time at Tattersalls and was sold for 95,000 guineas to Julian Smith. For the remainder of his racing career he was owned by Smith in partnership with Peter Gleeson and Larence "Loz" Conway. The former soccer player Alan Brazil was reported to be involved in the colt's ownership, but withdrew his interest at the end of the year.

In December 2004, Indian Haven's trainer Paul D'Arcy was awarded "a substantial sum in damages" after suing the Evening Star for publishing allegations that he had "stopped" the horse in the Dewhurst, and unlawfully manipulated the subsequent sale. After the settlement D'Arcy was "fully vindicated" with the publishers of the story admitting that the trainer had behaved "entirely professionally and lawfully".

=== 2003: three-year-old season ===
In early 2003 D'Arcy moved from High Havens to the Green Ridge Stable. On his 2003 debut the colt was assigned a weight of 125 pounds in the Listed European Free Handicap over seven furlongs at Newmarket on 16 April and started the 9/2 third favourite in a six-runner field. After pulling hard in the early stages he was sent to the front by Egan a furlong out and kept on well to win by two and a half lengths from the Norfolk Stakes winner Barons Pit. Egan commented "I thought he had a big chance. He's always been a very good horse. He's had problems but they've been patient with him. He's a hell of a horse".

In the 2000 Guineas over the Rowley Mile at Newmarket on 3 May Indian Haven started a 20/1 outsider but was repeatedly blocked as he attempted to obtain a clear run and finished unplaced behind Refuse To Bend.

Three weeks after his run at Newmarket Indian Haven was sent to Ireland for the Irish 2,000 Guineas over one mile on soft ground at the Curragh. He had not been among the original entries, meaning that his owners had to pay a supplementary fee of €40,000 to run in the race. The Aidan O'Brien-trained Tomahawk started favourite ahead of Tout Seul and Zafeen, with Indian Haven next in the betting on 8/1. The other twelve runners included Desert Destiny (from the Godolphin stable), France (Tetrarch Stakes) and Makhlab (Horris Hill Stakes). Indian Haven tracked the leaders as the pacemaker Great Pyramid made the early running and was in fifth place approaching the least two furlongs. He overtook his fellow British challenger Saturn a furlong and a half out and won "comfortably" by a length from France with Tout Seul two and a half lengths back in third. After the race Egan, who was winning his first classic on his 35th birthday said "I got flattened three times in the [English] Guineas, but I always thought I was going to win here as long as we got the run of the race. When Johnny Murtagh on Saturn went on three out I held on to Indian Haven because I did not want to hit the front too soon, but I always knew we would pick him up. I have always wanted to ride a Classic winner here and now, thank God, I have." Paul D'Arcy commented "he's always been a horse with a terrific turn of foot and he proved it up the hill today".

Racing on much firmer ground, Indian Haven made no impact in his two subsequent races that year. He finished last of the eleven runners behind Zafeen in the St James's Palace Stakes at Royal Ascot in June and was then off the course for four months before running unplaced behind Rakti in the Champion Stakes over ten furlongs at Newmarket in October.

=== 2004: four-year-old season ===
Darryll Holland took over from Egan as Indian Haven's jockey in 2004 and rode him in all three of his races. The colt began his third season by finishing fifth to Hurricane Alan in the Sandown Mile in April and then ran unplaced behind Russian Rhythm in the Lockinge Stakes at Newbury on 15 May. He was then dropped in class and distance for the Prix du Palais-Royal over 1400 metres at Longchamp Racecourse thirteen days later and finished sixth of the ten runners behind Puppeteer.

Indian Haven's poor form led to x-ray examinations which revealed a "non-displaced fragment of the left-fore fetlock". The condition was treated with arthroscopic surgery but the colt did not resume full training and was retired at the end of the year.

== Stud record ==
At the end of his racing career, Indian Haven was retired to become a breeding stallion at the Irish National Stud. In 2012, he moved to the Withyslade Farm in Wiltshire.

The best of his offspring have included Aspen Darlin (Firth of Clyde Stakes), Ashram (Somerville Tattersall Stakes) and Beachfire (Wolferton Handicap).

== Death ==
Indian Haven died on 11 July 2023, at the age of 23.

== Pedigree ==
Pedigree of Indian Haven (GB), stallion, 2000
Sire Indian Ridge (IRE) 1985	Ahonoora (GB); 1975	Lorenzaccio	Klairon
Sire Indian Ridge (IRE) 1985	Ahonoora (GB); 1975	Lorenzaccio	Phoenissa
Sire Indian Ridge (IRE) 1985	Ahonoora (GB); 1975	Helen Nichols	Martial
Sire Indian Ridge (IRE) 1985	Ahonoora (GB); 1975	Helen Nichols	Quaker Girl
Sire Indian Ridge (IRE) 1985	Hillbrow (GB); 1975	Swing Easy	Delta Judge
Sire Indian Ridge (IRE) 1985	Hillbrow (GB); 1975	Swing Easy	Free Flowing
Sire Indian Ridge (IRE) 1985	Hillbrow (GB); 1975	Golden City	Skymaster
Sire Indian Ridge (IRE) 1985	Hillbrow (GB); 1975	Golden City	West Shaw
Dam Madame Dubois (GB) 1987	Legend of France (USA); 1980	Lyphard	Northern Dancer
Dam Madame Dubois (GB) 1987	Legend of France (USA); 1980	Lyphard	Goofed
Dam Madame Dubois (GB) 1987	Legend of France (USA); 1980	Lupe	Primera
Dam Madame Dubois (GB) 1987	Legend of France (USA); 1980	Lupe	Alcoa
Dam Madame Dubois (GB) 1987	Shadywood (GB); 1982	Habitat	Sir Gaylord
Dam Madame Dubois (GB) 1987	Shadywood (GB); 1982	Habitat	Little Hut
Dam Madame Dubois (GB) 1987	Shadywood (GB); 1982	Milly Moss	Crepello
Dam Madame Dubois (GB) 1987	Shadywood (GB); 1982	Milly Moss	Bally's Mil (Family 2-o)
