= Indian Ink (horse) =

Irish-bred Thoroughbred racehorse

- Sire: Indian Ridge
- Grandsire: Ahonoora
- Dam: Maid of Killeen
- Damsire: Darshaan
- Sex: Mare
- Foaled: 19 March 2004
- Country: United Kingdom
- Colour: Chestnut
- Breeder: Killeen Castle Stud
- Owner: Raymond Tooth
- Trainer: Richard Hannon Sr.
- Record: 9:4-2-0
- Earnings: £422,733

Major wins
- Watership Down Stud Sales Stakes (2006); Cheveley Park Stakes (2006); Coronation Stakes (2007)

Awards
- Top-rated British-trained three-year-old filly (2007)

Indian Ink (foaled 2004) is an Irish-bred British-trained Thoroughbred racehorse and broodmare who was the highest-rated filly trained in the United Kingdom in 2007. As a two-year-old in 2006, she won three of her seven races, culminating in a victory in the Group One Cheveley Park Stakes. In the following year she was beaten in her first two races, but then defeated a strong international field by six lengths to win the Coronation Stakes at Royal Ascot. Throughout her racing career she demonstrated a marked preference for soft ground. At the end of her racing career she was sold for 2,000,000 guineas and retired to stud.

== Background ==
Indian Ink was a chestnut filly with a faint white star bred in Ireland by the County Meath-based Killeen Castle Stud. Her sire, Indian Ridge, and was a sprinter who won the King's Stand Stakes at Royal Ascot in 1989 and later became one of the few successful stallions of modern times to emerge from the Byerley Turk sire-line. His other progeny included the Prix de l'Abbaye winner Namid and the Breeders' Cup Mile winners Ridgewood Pearl and Domedriver. Her dam, Maid of Killeen won one minor race and has also produced the Bahrain Trophy winner Feel Like Dancing.

As a yearling, Indian Ink was sent to the Tattersalls sales in October at Newmarket where she was bought for 25,000 guineas by Peter Doyle Bloodstock. The price was considered disappointing for her breeder, who had paid £75,000 to have Maid of Killeen covered by Indian Ridge. The filly passed into the ownership of Raymond Tooth and was sent into training with Richard Hannon Sr. at East Everleigh, Wiltshire. She was ridden in all of her races by Richard Hughes.

== Racing career ==
=== 2006: two-year-old season ===
Indian Ink began her racing career by finishing unplaced in a six furlong maiden race at Newbury Racecourse in June. Seventeen days later, over the same course and distance, she recorded her first success when she "comfortably" won a similar event by two and a half lengths from twelve opponent. In July the filly was moved up in class for the Group Three Princess Margaret Stakes at Ascot Racecourse. She started the 4/1 favourite but finished fourth behind Scarlet Runner, Vital Statistics and Simply Perfect. A month later she was moved up in class again for the Group Two Lowther Stakes at York Racecourse. She led from the start but was caught in the closing strides and beaten half a length by the Barry Hills-trained Silk Blossom, with Scarlet Runner unplaced.

Indian Ink next appeared in the Watership Down Stud Sales Stakes, a valuable event confined to fillies who had been offered for sale at Tattersall in October 2005. Racing over six and a half furlongs on soft ground, she was made 9/4 favourite in a field of twenty-two runners. She broke clear of the field in the final quarter mile and won by three lengths from Siamese Cat with the future Gamely Handicap winner Diamond Diva three lengths further back in third place. According to the Daily Telegraph's correspondent, the winner "strolled home", in the race, with her rivals "strung out like washing". A week after her win at Ascot, Indian Ink was moved up to Group One level for the first time when she was one of eleven fillies to contest the Cheveley Park Stakes at Newmarket Racecourse. Ridden as usual by Hughes, she was made 3/1 joint favourite alongside the French-trained Prix Morny runner-up Magic America. Indian Ink was settled behind the leaders before making progress in the final quarter mile, catching the outsider Dhanyata in the closing stages and winning "tenaciously" by a neck.

=== 2007: three-year-old season ===
Indian Ink began her three-year-old season at Newbury where she contested the seven furlong Fred Darling Stakes, a trial race for the 1000 Guineas. She was made 15/8 favourite, but despite finishing strongly she failed by a neck to catch the 25/1 outsider Majestic Roi. In the 1000 Guineas two weeks later she finished fifth of the twenty-one runners on fast ground behind the Irish filly Finsceal Beo.

At Royal Ascot on 22 June Indian Ink was the 8/1 fourth choice in the betting for the Group One Coronation Stakes over one mile: she had been offered at 25/1 on the morning of the race, but attracted strong support as heavy showers of rain led to a softening of the ground. Her opponents included Finsceal Beo, Majestic Roi, Silk Blossom, Mi Emma (winner of the German 1,000 Guineas) and Darjina, a French filly who had defeated Finsceal Beo in the Poule d'Essai des Pouliches. Hughes restrained the filly in the early stages before making ground approaching the straight. Indian Ink took the lead a furlong from the finish and accelerated clear of her opponents to win by six lengths from Mi Emma who beat Darjina by a head for second place. After the race, Hannon explained that "The ground made a big difference. All her best runs last year were on easier ground. Just a bit of give in the ground is fine. In the 1,000 Guineas, the ground was very fast and she got into a bit of trouble." Hughes said that Indian Ink "has an explosive turn of foot. I have to be careful when to kick on. It was just a matter of not going too soon."

Despite plans to run the filly in the Falmouth Stakes or the Matron Stakes, Indian Ink did not race again. At the end of the year Indian Ink was sent to the Tattersalls December Mares Sale and was sold for 2,000,000 guineas to Hamdan Al Maktoum's Shadwell Estate.

== Assessment ==
In the 2007 World Thoroughbred Racehorse Rankings Indian Ink was given a rating of 121 making her the 29th best racehorse in the world and the fourth best three-year-old filly behind Rags to Riches, Darjina and Peeping Fawn.

== Stud record ==
Indian Ink was retired from racing to become a broodmare for her new owner. The first of her foals to reach the racecourse was Wahaab, a chestnut colt by Tamayuz, who won a maiden race at Goodwood on his debut in May 2013.

== Pedigree ==
Pedigree of Indian Ink (IRE), chestnut mare, 2004
Sire Indian Ridge (IRE) 1985	Ahonoora (GB); 1975	Lorenzaccio	Klairon
Sire Indian Ridge (IRE) 1985	Ahonoora (GB); 1975	Lorenzaccio	Phoenissa
Sire Indian Ridge (IRE) 1985	Ahonoora (GB); 1975	Helen Nichols	Martial
Sire Indian Ridge (IRE) 1985	Ahonoora (GB); 1975	Helen Nichols	Quaker Girl
Sire Indian Ridge (IRE) 1985	Hillbrow (GB); 1975	Swing Easy	Delta Judge
Sire Indian Ridge (IRE) 1985	Hillbrow (GB); 1975	Swing Easy	Free Flowing
Sire Indian Ridge (IRE) 1985	Hillbrow (GB); 1975	Golden City	Skymaster
Sire Indian Ridge (IRE) 1985	Hillbrow (GB); 1975	Golden City	West Shaw
Dam Maid of Killeen (IRE) 1996	Darshaan (GB); 1981	Shirley Heights	Mill Reef
Dam Maid of Killeen (IRE) 1996	Darshaan (GB); 1981	Shirley Heights	Hardiemma
Dam Maid of Killeen (IRE) 1996	Darshaan (GB); 1981	Delsy	Abdos
Dam Maid of Killeen (IRE) 1996	Darshaan (GB); 1981	Delsy	Kelty
Dam Maid of Killeen (IRE) 1996	Sovereign Touch (IRE); 1989	Pennine Walk	Persian Bold
Dam Maid of Killeen (IRE) 1996	Sovereign Touch (IRE); 1989	Pennine Walk	Tifrums
Dam Maid of Killeen (IRE) 1996	Sovereign Touch (IRE); 1989	Sovereign Dona	Sovereign Path
Dam Maid of Killeen (IRE) 1996	Sovereign Touch (IRE); 1989	Sovereign Dona	Dogana (Family:4-n)
