= Notnowcato =

British-bred Thoroughbred racehorse

- Sire: Inchinor
- Grandsire: Ahonoora
- Dam: Rambling Rose
- Damsire: Cadeaux Genereux
- Sex: Stallion
- Foaled: 25 March 2002
- Country: Great Britain
- Colour: Chestnut
- Breeder: Southcourt Stud
- Owner: Anthony and David de Rothschild
- Trainer: Michael Stoute
- Record: 20: 7–3–4
- Earnings: £971,688

Major wins
- Earl of Sefton Stakes (2006); Brigadier Gerard Stakes (2006); International Stakes (2006); Tattersalls Gold Cup (2007); Eclipse Stakes (2007)
- Last updated on 12 October 2006

Notnowcato (25 March 2002 – 2019) was a thoroughbred racehorse and sire, bred and trained in the United Kingdom. He won several important races in a career which lasted from 2004 to 2007, and is best known for his victory in the 2007 Eclipse Stakes.

== Background ==
Notnowcato, a 16.1-hand chestnut horse with a narrow, white stripe, was bred by the Rothschild family at their own Southcourt Stud near Leighton Buzzard, Bedfordshire, England. His unusual name is a reference to The Pink Panther film series. He was sent into training with Sir Michael Stoute at Newmarket.

As a son of the Hungerford Stakes winner Inchinor, he is a representative of the Byerley Turk sire line, unlike more than 95% of modern thoroughbreds, who descend directly from the Darley Arabian. Aside from Notnowcato, Inchinor, who died in 2003, sired over five hundred winners including the Queen Elizabeth II Stakes winner Summoner, the Prix de Diane winner Latice and the sprinter Cape of Good Hope. Notnowcato is the first-recorded foal of his dam, Rambling Rose, who won the Listed Galtres Stakes at York in 1998.

== Racing career ==
=== 2004–2005: Early career ===
Notnowcato began his career as a two-year-old in 2004 with placed efforts at Warwick and Salisbury. The following year he proved himself to be a useful and consistent performer, winning two handicaps at Newmarket from six starts. He was obviously some way below top class (his official rating was 101), but his steady improvement suggested that he could develop into a Group race performer.

=== 2006: Four-year-old season ===
As a four-year-old, Notnowcato continued his "rapid progress", signalling his arrival at a higher level by winning the Earl of Sefton Stakes on his debut in impressive style. A month later he followed up with a victory over a stronger field, including Group race winners Hattan (Chester Vase) and Bandari (Princess of Wales's Stakes), in the Brigadier Gerard Stakes at Sandown Park. He finished only fifth in a highly anticipated renewal of the Prince of Wales's Stakes at Royal Ascot, but, in being beaten less than two lengths behind proven Group One winners Ouija Board, Electrocutionist, Manduro and David Junior he proved that he was a capable of competing at the highest level. This impression was re-inforced when Notnowcato finished second to David Junior in the Eclipse Stakes, with Ouija Board, who had trouble finding a clear run, back in fifth.

At York for the International Stakes he was partnered for the first time by Ryan Moore and recorded his best win up to that point. Taking the lead two furlongs out he showed his ability to "dig deep" by staying on strongly to claim a short-head win over Maraahel, with the odds-on favourite Dylan Thomas in fourth.

Having had a hard race, Notnowcato was given a break to "freshen him up" for an autumn campaign. These plans came to nothing, however, as he ran an "uncharacteristically flat" race when finishing last of eight behind Pride in the Champion Stakes and did not return until 2007.

=== 2007: Five-year-old season ===
He began his five-year-old season, with a fourth place behind the Breeders' Cup Turf winner Red Rocks in the Gordon Richards Stakes, before travelling outside England for the first and only time to challenge for the Tattersalls Gold Cup at the Curragh. Under a strong ride from Johnny Murtagh (who was warned by the stewards for excessive use of the whip) he took up the lead in the straight and stayed on under pressure to hold off Dylan Thomas by a head, with Youmzain four lengths back in third. After the race, Dylan Thomas's trainer, Aidan O'Brien offered "no excuses". At Royal Ascot he was part of a small, but exceptionally strong field for the Prince of Wales's Stakes. He finished third behind the 2007 World Champion Manduro and Dylan Thomas, with Red Rocks fourth and the 2006 Derby winner Sir Percy last of the six runners.

The 2007 Eclipse Stakes was expected to be a contest between the 2007 Derby winner Authorized and the Ballydoyle-trained four-year-old George Washington, who had been rated the equal-best horse in Europe in 2006. Ryan Moore, re-united for the race with Notnowcato, had noticed that the pace of the turf course was uneven, and decided to take advantage of this fact. As the horses entered the straight, Moore moved Notnowcato sharply to the left to race on the stands side, completely isolated from the other seven runners. While Authorized held off the challenge of George Washington on the far side, Notnowcato kept on strongly along the stands rail to score an upset length-and-a-half victory. Moore was effusive in his praise for the colt, saying "he's got a lot of class and a great heart" and offering his opinion that "our lad proved he is the best mile-and-a-quarter horse in this country". Others, however, considered him a lucky winner, with Chris McGrath in the Independent claiming that Authorized was a "victim of tactics" who had been "mugged in a messy race".

On his next start, Notnowcato finished third to Authorized and Dylan Thomas in his attempt to win a second International Stakes. For the second year in a row his poorest performance came in his seasonal finale in the Champion Stakes, this time finishing a remote sixth to the French colt Literato.

Earlier speculation concerning a challenge for the Breeders' Cup Classic came to nothing, and he was retired to stud.

== Assessment ==
Notnowcato received a peak Timeform rating of 131+, although his official end of year Timeform rating in 2007 was 128.

In the World Thoroughbred Racehorse Rankings he was rated at 121 in 2006, making him the twentieth-best racehorse in the world, and in 2007 he was rated at 123, placing him thirteenth. In the latter year he was rated six pounds below Authorized and Dylan Thomas, despite having beaten both.

== Stud career ==
Notnowcato retired to stand as a stallion at the Stanley House Stud at Newmarket, with an initial stud fee of £8,000. His first crop of foals reached the racecourse in 2011. In June 2012, Notnowcato's son, Fast Or Free, won the Britannia Stakes at Royal Ascot. In 2013, Knockhouse Stud in County Kilkenny, Ireland purchased Notnowcato.

The most successful of his offspring included Redkirk Warrior (winner of the 2017 and 2018 Group 1 Newmarket Handicap as well as the Black Caviar Lightning), Custom Cut (winner of seven Group races including the Group 2 Sandown Mile, Group 2 Joel Stakes and Group 2 Solonaway Stakes) and Long Dog (Grade 1 Royal Bond Novice Hurdle and Grade 1 Future Champions Novice Hurdle).

Notnowcato collapsed and died of a suspected heart attack when covering a mare at Knockhouse Stud late in 2019.

== Pedigree ==
Pedigree of Notnowcato (GB), chestnut stallion, 2002
Sire Inchinor (GB) 1990	Ahonoora; 1975	Lorenzaccio	Klairon
Sire Inchinor (GB) 1990	Ahonoora; 1975	Lorenzaccio	Phoenissa
Sire Inchinor (GB) 1990	Ahonoora; 1975	Helen Nichols	Martial
Sire Inchinor (GB) 1990	Ahonoora; 1975	Helen Nichols	Quaker Girl
Sire Inchinor (GB) 1990	Inchmurrin; 1985	Lomond	Northern Dancer
Sire Inchinor (GB) 1990	Inchmurrin; 1985	Lomond	My Charmer
Sire Inchinor (GB) 1990	Inchmurrin; 1985	On Show	Welsh Pageant
Sire Inchinor (GB) 1990	Inchmurrin; 1985	On Show	African Dancer
Dam Rambling Rose (GB) 1995	Cadeaux Genereux; 1985	Young Generation	Balidar
Dam Rambling Rose (GB) 1995	Cadeaux Genereux; 1985	Young Generation	Brig O'Doon
Dam Rambling Rose (GB) 1995	Cadeaux Genereux; 1985	Smarten Up	Sharpen Up
Dam Rambling Rose (GB) 1995	Cadeaux Genereux; 1985	Smarten Up	Languissola
Dam Rambling Rose (GB) 1995	Blush Rambler; 1988	Blushing Groom	Red God
Dam Rambling Rose (GB) 1995	Blush Rambler; 1988	Blushing Groom	Runaway Bride
Dam Rambling Rose (GB) 1995	Blush Rambler; 1988	Nikitina	Nijinsky
Dam Rambling Rose (GB) 1995	Blush Rambler; 1988	Nikitina	Vela (Family: 2)
