= Don't Forget Me (horse) =

Irish-bred Thoroughbred racehorse

- Sire: Ahonoora
- Grandsire: Lorenzaccio
- Dam: African Doll
- Damsire: African Sky
- Sex: Stallion
- Foaled: 10 April 1984
- Country: Ireland
- Colour: Bay
- Owner: James Horgan
- Trainer: Richard Hannon, Sr.
- Record: 10:5-1-0

Major wins
- Vintage Stakes (1986); Champagne Stakes (1986); 2000 Guineas (1987); Irish 2000 Guineas (1987)

Awards
- Timeform rating: 120p in 1986, 127 in 1987

Don't Forget Me (10 April 1984 – 7 March 2010) was an Irish-bred, British-trained Thoroughbred racehorse and sire best known for winning the classic 2000 Guineas in 1987. He showed promising form as a two-year-old in 1986, winning three of his four races including the Lanson Champagne Stakes and the Champagne Stakes. In the early part of 1987 he survived an injury scare to win the 2000 Guineas and completed a rare double by winning the Irish 2000 Guineas two weeks later. He was beaten in his remaining three races and was retired to stud, where he had some success as a sire of winners.

== Background ==
Don't Forget Me was a dark-coated bay horse with no white markings bred in Ireland. He was sired by Ahonoora, whose other offspring included The Derby winner Dr Devious. Ahonoora was a representative of the Byerley Turk sire line, unlike more than 95% of modern thoroughbreds, who descend directly from the Darley Arabian. Don't Forget Me's dam African Doll was a great-granddaughter of Circassia, an influential broodmare whose other descendants included Desert King and Frankel.

As a yearling the colt was sent to the October sales at Newmarket where he was sold for 19,000 guineas. He entered the ownership of the County Cork-based businessman James Horgan and was sent into training with Richard Hannon, Sr.

== Racing career ==
=== 1986: two-year-old season ===
After finishing fourth behind Who Knows over a distance of six furlongs on his debut, Don't Forget Me recorded his first success in July 1986 when he won a seven furlong maiden race at Sandown Park Racecourse. In August he was moved up in class to contest the Group Three Lanson Champagne Stakes at Goodwood where he was ridden by Pat Eddery and started the 7/1 third favourite. Don't Forget Me led from the start and turned back several challenges in the straight to win by three quarters of a length from Midyan. In September at Doncaster Racecourse the colt was again partnered by Eddery in the Group Two Champagne Stakes over seven furlongs and started third favourite behind the Washington Singer Stakes winner Deputy Governor and the Gimcrack Stakes winner Wiganthorpe. As at Goodwood, Don't Forget Me took the lead from the start and in the closing stages he held off the challenge of Deputy Governor to win by half a length with Who Knows a length and a half away in third. The performance saw the colt considered a leading contender for the Group One Dewhurst Stakes at Newmarket Racecourse, but Hannon opted not to run him again in 1986.

=== 1987: three-year-old season ===
Don't Forget Me began his three-year-old season in the Craven Stakes over the Rowley Mile at Newmarket in April, where he was matched against Ajdal the winner of the Dewhurst Stakes and the ante-post favourite for the 2000 Guineas. Ajdal took the lead a furlong from the finish and looked likely to win easily, but Don't Forget Me rallied strongly in the final strides to finish only three quarters of a length behind the winner.

Over the same course and distance on 2 May, Don't Forget Me started at odds of 9/1 for the 181st running of the 2000 Guineas. The colt had suffered an injury to his hoof when losing a shoe on the journey to the course and was only cleared to run at the last moment after undergoing several hours of intensive treatment involving ice packs and a poultice. With Eddery partnering the Geoff Wragg-trained Most Welcome, the ride on Don't Forget Me went to the Scottish jockey Willie Carson, who was under instructions to pull the colt up if he showed any sign of lameness during the race. Carson went into the lead from the start and sent Don't Forget me down the centre of the wide, straight course. In the final quarter mile the colt was challenged on both the left and right but held on under strong pressure to win by a neck from Bellotto, with Most Welcome, Midyan, Ajdal (the 6/5 favourite) and Deputy Governor close behind. Most Welcome was subsequently disqualified by the racecourse stewards for causing interference. Don't Forget Me's winning time of 1:36.74 was the fastest electrically recorded time in the history of the race.

Two weeks later Don't Forget Me, with Carson again in the saddle, attempted to become the second 2000 Guineas winner, after Right Tack in 1969, to win the Irish 2000 Guineas at the Curragh. He was opposed again by Ajdal and the two English-trained colts were made the 6/4 joint-favourites in a field of nine runners. As at Newmarket, Don't Forget Me established an early lead and responded well when challenged in the final furlong, winning by a half a length and a neck from Entitled and Ajdal. His victory was enthusiastically received, with hundreds of fans thronging the winner's enclosure and chanting the name of the winning jockey. Although the Derby was briefly considered as ha target, Hannon opted to keep the colt to the one-mile distance and his next race was the St James's Palace Stakes at Royal Ascot. He was ridden by Eddery after Carson received a seven-day ban for striking another jockey with his whip in a minor race at Bath Racecourse. He started the 10/11 favourite but finished fourth behind Half A Year, Soviet Star and Risk Me.

After a break of two months, Don't Forget Me was sent to France for the Prix Jacques le Marois at Deauville Racecourse in August, when he was reunited with Carson. As usual, he attempted to lead all the way, but was overtaken in the closing stages and finished fourth to Miesque. On his only subsequent appearance, the colt was tried over ten furlongs on soft ground in the Champion Stakes at Newmarket in October. In a change of tactics, Carson attempted to restrain Don't Forget Me in the early stages, but he made no progress in the last quarter mile and finished sixth, eight length behind the winner Triptych.

== Assessment ==
In 1986, the Independent Timeform organisation gave Don't Forget Me a rating of 120p, the "p" indicating that he was likely to improve. In the official International Classification he was given a rating of 117, ten pounds behind the top-rated Reference Point. In the following year's International Classification he was rated on 123, making him the eighth best three-year-old colt in Europe. Timeform awarded him a rating of 127.

In their book, A Century of Champions, based on the Timeform rating system, John Randall and Tony Morris rated Don't Forget Me an "inferior" winner of the 2000 Guineas.

== Stud record ==
In July 1987, Don't Forget Me was bought for IR£3 million by the Irish National Stud. He stood as a stallion in Ireland and was also shuttled to stand in Australasia during the southern hemisphere breeding season. He had some success as a sire before being exported to India in 1994. His last reported foals were born in 2003 and he died on 7 March 2010 in India. His best winners included:

- Irish Memory (bay horse, foaled 1989), won Tyros Stakes, Tetrarch Stakes
- My Memoirs (bay horse, 1989), won Dee Stakes
- A Smooth One (bay mare, 1991), won Princess Margaret Stakes
- Insatiable (bay horse, 1993), won Brigadier Gerard Stakes, Prix Dollar, Blandford Stakes
- Rudi's Pet (chestnut gelding, 1994), won King George Stakes, Vodafone Dash

== Sire line tree ==
- Don't Forget Me
  - Irish Memory
  - My Memoirs
  - Insatiable
    - Remember Rose
  - Rudy's Pet
  - Wild Eagle

== Pedigree ==
Pedigree of Don't Forget Me (IRE), bay stallion, 1984
Sire Ahonoora (GB) 1975	Lorenzaccio (GB); 1965	Klairon	Clarion
Sire Ahonoora (GB) 1975	Lorenzaccio (GB); 1965	Klairon	Kalmia
Sire Ahonoora (GB) 1975	Lorenzaccio (GB); 1965	Phoenissa	The Phoenix
Sire Ahonoora (GB) 1975	Lorenzaccio (GB); 1965	Phoenissa	Erica Fragrans
Sire Ahonoora (GB) 1975	Helen Nichols (GB); 1966	Martial	Hill Gail
Sire Ahonoora (GB) 1975	Helen Nichols (GB); 1966	Martial	Discipliner
Sire Ahonoora (GB) 1975	Helen Nichols (GB); 1966	Quaker Girl	Whistler
Sire Ahonoora (GB) 1975	Helen Nichols (GB); 1966	Quaker Girl	Mayflower
Dam African Doll (IRE) 1978	African Sky (GB); 1970	Sing Sing	Tudor Minstrel
Dam African Doll (IRE) 1978	African Sky (GB); 1970	Sing Sing	Agin The Law
Dam African Doll (IRE) 1978	African Sky (GB); 1970	Sweet Caroline	Nimbus (GB)
Dam African Doll (IRE) 1978	African Sky (GB); 1970	Sweet Caroline	Lackaday
Dam African Doll (IRE) 1978	Mithril (GB); 1966	Princely Gift	Nasrullah
Dam African Doll (IRE) 1978	Mithril (GB); 1966	Princely Gift	Blue Gem
Dam African Doll (IRE) 1978	Mithril (GB); 1966	Baraka	Souverain
Dam African Doll (IRE) 1978	Mithril (GB); 1966	Baraka	Circassia (Family: 1-k)
