= Reginald N. Webster =

Irish-born American businessman and racehorse owner

- Born: February 7, 1898; Dublin, Ireland
- Died: February 8, 1983 (aged 85); West Palm Beach, Florida
- Occupations: Businessman: Precision parts manufacturer Racehorse owner/breeder

Reginald N. Webster (February 7, 1898 – February 8, 1983) was an American businessman and Thoroughbred racehorse owner.

Born in Dublin, Ireland, Reginald Webster's family emigrated to the United States when he was a small boy. Pursuing a career in business, he was president of precision parts manufacturer Standard-Thomson Corp. of Waltham, Massachusetts. Following the company's 1974 takeover by Allegheny International Inc., he retired.

== Thoroughbred horse racing ==
Reginald Webster became involved in Thoroughbred racing in 1945. In 1947 he hired Lucien Laurin to oversee the conditioning of his horses. With the future Hall of Fame trainer, Webster had his best successes in American racing when in 1966 they won the Belmont Stakes.

Webster also raced horses in England and Ireland. His Irish-bred colt Martial, trained by legendary Irish horseman Paddy Prendergast, won the 1960 2,000 Guineas at England's Newmarket Racecourse making Webster one of only a few Americans to ever win both an American Classic and a British Classic race.

Reginald Webster's notable horses included:

- Quill - filly who was voted the 1958 U.S. Champion 2-year-old Filly and whose wins included the Matron, Acorn and Mother Goose Stakes
- Martial - son of Kentucky Derby winner Hill Gail, he won the 2,000 Guineas, Coventry Stakes
- Traffic - won the 1963 Hopeful Stakes
- National - won the 1964 Ohio Derby, 1965 Roseben Handicap
- Amberoid - won the 1966 Wood Memorial, Belmont Stakes
- Artfully - won the 1976 Maskette Handicap
- Pearl Necklace - won the 1978 New York Handicap and Maskette Handicap

Reginald Webster was a member of The Jockey Club and served as president of the Thoroughbred Owners and Breeders Association. He was living in Palm Beach, Florida when he died at age eighty-five of heart failure.
