= Vinnie Roe =

Irish-bred Thoroughbred racehorse (1998–2025)

- Sire: Definite Article
- Grandsire: Indian Ridge
- Dam: Kayu
- Damsire: Tap On Wood
- Sex: Stallion
- Foaled: 6 April 1998
- Died: 10 September 2025 (aged 27)
- Country: Ireland
- Colour: Bay or Brown
- Breeder: Virginia Moeran
- Owner: Jim Sheridan
- Trainer: Dermot Weld
- Record: 29: 13-4-5
- Earnings: £1,263,316

Major wins
- Eyrefield Stakes (2000); Challenge Stakes (2001); Ballycullen Stakes (2001); Irish St. Leger (2001, 2002, 2003, 2004); Prix Royal-Oak (2001); Saval Beg Stakes (2002, 2005); Ballyroan Stakes (2002, 2003)

Awards
- European Champion Stayer (2002)

Vinnie Roe (6 April 1998 – 10 September 2025) was an Irish Thoroughbred racehorse and active sire. He won the Irish St. Leger for four years in succession (2001–2004) and was named European Champion Stayer in the Cartier Racing Awards for 2002. He also became known internationally for his three attempts to win the Melbourne Cup in which he finished fourth, second and eighth. He was officially rated the best stayer in the world on three occasions (2002, 2003, 2004). He was retired from racing in 2005 and was at stud in Templemore County Tipperary (Ireland). Vinnie Roe died in September 2025, at the age of 27.

== Background ==
Vinnie Roe was bred in County Tipperary, Ireland by Virginia Moeran. As a son of the National Stakes winner Definite Article, he is a representative of the Byerley Turk sire line, unlike more than 95% of modern thoroughbreds, who descend directly from the Darley Arabian. Aside from Vinnie Roe, Definite Article has sired the winners of more than four hundred races including the Geoffrey Freer Stakes winner Lochbuie and a large number winners under National Hunt rules. Through Definite Article, Vinnie Roe is inbred to the Champion Stakes winner Lorenzaccio (see below). Vinnie Roe's dam Kayu, an unraced twin, was a successful broodmare, producing at least five other winners.

As a foal, Vinnie Roe was sent to the Goffs November sale and bought for 48,000 gns. A year later, he was sent to the Goffs Orby sale, where he was sold for IR£50,000^{1} to Dermot Weld on behalf of the film director Jim Sheridan, who named the horse after his nephew. Sheridan owned the horse in partnership with Antonio Balzarini, and over the course of his career, Vinnie Roe was variously described as being owned by Sheridan, Balzarini or both.

Vinnie Roe was trained throughout his racing career by Dermot Weld at the Curragh and was ridden in all but one of his races by Pat Smullen. He was an easily recognisable runner, usually racing in blinkers and a sheepskin noseband. Because of the differences in breeding seasons between the Northern and Southern hemispheres, Australian sources often describe Vinnie Roe as being a year older than his "official" age.

== Racing career ==
=== 2000: two-year-old season ===
Vinnie Roe made a winning debut in a maiden race at Leopardstown in June, staying on strongly to get up on the line and beat the filly Affianced by a head. In October, he was stepped up to Group Three class and finished third behind two Aidan O'Brien-trained runners in the Beresford Stakes at The Curragh. On his final start of the year, he returned to Leopardstown to record his first important win in the Listed Eyrefield Stakes, beating the future Tattersalls Gold Cup winner Rebelline by one and a half lengths.

=== 2001: three-year-old season ===
Vinnie Roe was campaigned over middle distances in the early part of his three-year-old season. He finished behind Galileo in the Ballysax Stakes, the Derrinstown Stud Derby Trial and the Irish Derby and was also sent to Rome, where he finished fourth to Morshdi in the Derby Italiano.

He was then moved up to staying (Extended) distances and was unbeaten in his remaining four races. Three weeks after his run in the Irish Derby, he was driven clear in the closing stages to win the Listed Challenge Stakes at Leopardstown by four lengths. A month later, he stayed on to take the Ballycullen Stakes at the Curragh by a head from the John Oxx-trained favourite Pugin, who was receiving three pounds. The race illustrated Vinnie Roe's aptitude for longer distances, as Pugin had finished three lengths in front of him at level weights in the Irish Derby.

In the Irish St. Leger in September, he faced a strong field headed by the 2000 English St Leger winner Millenary, the future Arc winner Marienbard and the double Champion Stayer Persian Punch. Pat Smullen held up Vinnie Roe in the early stages as Persian Punch set the pace from Millenary before making his challenge in the straight. Millenary took the lead, but Smullen brought Vinnie Roe through to overtake him inside the final furlong and win by two lengths.

Vinnie Roe was then sent to Longchamp for the Prix Royal-Oak and secured his second successive Group One win, this time over two miles. Smullen took him into the lead two furlongs out and he won by two and a half lengths, despite hanging to the right in the closing stages.

Dermot Weld decided not to send Vinnie Roe for the Melbourne Cup in 2001, as he believed that the journey would be too difficult for the three-year-old.

=== 2002: four-year-old season ===
Vinnie Roe began 2002 by taking his fifth race in succession, winning the Listed Saval Beg Stakes "easily" by four lengths. He was then sent to race in England for the first time and was made favourite for the two and a half mile Ascot Gold Cup. He made a strong challenge in the straight to briefly take the lead, but although he stayed on "gamely" he was headed again in the closing stages and beaten a neck by the gelding Royal Rebel in what the BBC described as a "thrilling" race.

Two months later, he won the Listed Ballyroan Stakes at Leopardstown, holding off Millstreet by half a length while carrying a weight of 10-0 (140 pounds). In September, he won his second Irish St. Leger, beating Pugin by one and a half lengths, with Millenary and Warrsan among the beaten horses. After the race, Dermot Weld called him "a very brave horse, one of the toughest I have ever trained."

Vinnie Roe was then sent to Australia for the Melbourne Cup. He was allotted a weight of 59 kg, three kilograms more than any other runner, but was nevertheless made favourite at 9/2. According to The Age, he was the "centre of attention" before the race and impressed observers including Bart Cummings with a "brilliant" exercise gallop. In the race, he settled well and was moved up to take the lead two furlongs out, but was then challenged and overtaken by his stable companion Media Puzzle. He ran on under pressure, but was passed by Mr Prudent and Beekeeper in the closing stages to finish fourth. Weld described the performance as "a big run on a track that was too firm for him" and added, "he'll be back."

=== 2003: five-year-old season ===
After his run in Melbourne, Vinnie Roe was off the course for nine months. He returned in August 2003 to win his second Ballyroan Stakes, winning by a head from Carpanetto, who was receiving seventeen pounds. In his attempt to win a third Irish St. Leger, he was opposed by five runners including the English St Leger winner Bollin Eric and the improving Aidan O'Brien-trained three-year-old Powerscourt. Vinnie Roe was sent into the lead a furlong and a half from the finish and stayed on to win by a length from the English four-year-old Gamut.

Although there was much speculation about a return to Australia, Vinnie Roe was sent to Paris, rather than Melbourne, for his remaining two starts of 2003. He moved back down to one and a half miles for the Prix de l'Arc de Triomphe and finished fifth behind Dalakhani, then was fourth to Westerner when favourite for the Prix Royal-Oak.

=== 2004: six-year-old season ===
In the Saval Beg Stakes, the outsider Windermere was allowed to open up a huge lead ("a furlong" according to RTÉ), and Vinnie Roe, the odds-on favourite, was only able to close the gap to four and a half lengths by the finish. In August, he stayed on strongly in the closing stages of the Ballyroan Stakes but was beaten a neck by the English-trained Foreign Affairs.

In the Irish St. Leger, which was run in cold, wet conditions, he was made 7/2 joint favourite with the Aidan O'Brien-trained Brian Boru the winner of the 2003 English St Leger. Smullen tracked the leaders before moving into the lead at the start of the straight. Vinnie Roe went clear and stayed on through driving rain to win by two and a half lengths. His performance was greeted with loud applause throughout the final furlong and he was given a "hero's welcome" as he returned to the winner's enclosure. Smullen commented that Vinnie Roe had "annihilated them" and that "he loves it when there is a bit of cut in the ground."

He returned to Flemington for a second attempt at the Melbourne Cup in November and, as in 2002, he was given top weight. On this occasion, he was given 58 kg, which required him to give at least 2.5 kg to the rest of the field, which included the 2003 winner Makybe Diva. Before the race, Weld expressed concern that the conditions would be too firm but decided to run after heavy rainfall softened the ground. Smullen produced Vinnie Roe with a strong run in the straight and took him into the lead a furlong out, but he was almost immediately overtaken by Makybe Diva racing on the inside and finished second, beaten by one and a quarter lengths. After the race, Weld said that the conditions had been ideal for his horse but that "the weight just caught him out."

=== 2005: seven-year-old season ===
Vinnie Roe began 2005 by winning a second Saval Beg Stakes at the Curragh in May before being sent to England for a second attempt at the Gold Cup, run that year at York as Ascot was being renovated. He ran prominently but was unable to quicken in the closing stages and finished third of the seventeen runners behind Westerner. Both Weld and Smullen felt that the two and a half mile distance had been slightly too far for Vinnie Roe.

He finished third in the Ballyroan Stakes and then attempted to win a fifth Irish St. Leger, despite having his preparation interrupted by a minor injury. He took the lead in the straight but could find no extra in the closing stages and finished third, beaten a length behind the English challengers Collier Hill and The Whistling Teal.

On his final start, Vinnie Roe made a third attempt at the Melbourne Cup. Again he was given top weight, although on this occasion he was joined on 58 kg by Makybe Diva. His task was made more difficult after he endured a "nightmare" journey, having to receive veterinary treatment for colic on the flight and there were the usual fears about the possibility of firm ground. In the race, he was settled in the middle of the field before staying on strongly in the straight, but could never reach the leaders and finished eighth of the twenty-four runners. After the race, Smullen, who knew that it would be Vinnie Roe's last run, said that the horse "ran his heart out" and that it was "the end of an era."

Before his run at Flemington, Vinnie Roe was bought by the Coolmore, and after the race he was retired to his new owners' stud.

== Assessment ==
In the 2001 International Classification, Vinnie Roe was rated the third best horse in the world in the Extended distance division with a rating of 120. A year later, he was rated the best horse in the world in the Extended distance division with a rating of 120 and was named European Champion Stayer in the 2002 Cartier Racing Awards.

In the 2003 and 2004 World Thoroughbred Racehorse Rankings, Vinnie Roe was rated the equal-best horse in the world in the Extended distance division with a rating of 119. In 2005, he was rated the fifth best horse in the world in the Extended distance division with a rating of 116.

== Stud career ==
Vinnie Roe stood as a stallion at Longford House Stud in Templemore County Tipperary. He was marketed as a National Hunt sire with a stud fee for 2016 of €3000.

He has produced winning National Hunt horses Vintage Vinnie (record-setting performance in the Maryland Hunt Cup) and Noah And The Ark (winner of the Grand National Hurdle Stakes).

== Pedigree ==
Pedigree of Vinnie Roe (IRE), bay or brown stallion, 1998
Sire Definite Article (GB) 1992	Indian Ridge (IRE); 1985	Ahonoora	Lorenzaccio*
Sire Definite Article (GB) 1992	Indian Ridge (IRE); 1985	Ahonoora	Helen Nichols
Sire Definite Article (GB) 1992	Indian Ridge (IRE); 1985	Hillbrow	Swing Easy
Sire Definite Article (GB) 1992	Indian Ridge (IRE); 1985	Hillbrow	Golden City
Sire Definite Article (GB) 1992	Summer Fashion (GB); 1985	Moorestyle	Manacle
Sire Definite Article (GB) 1992	Summer Fashion (GB); 1985	Moorestyle	Guiding Star
Sire Definite Article (GB) 1992	Summer Fashion (GB); 1985	My Candy	Lorenzaccio*
Sire Definite Article (GB) 1992	Summer Fashion (GB); 1985	My Candy	Candy Gift
Dam Kayu (IRE) 1985	Tap On Wood (IRE); 1976	Sallust	Pall Mall
Dam Kayu (IRE) 1985	Tap On Wood (IRE); 1976	Sallust	Bandarilla
Dam Kayu (IRE) 1985	Tap On Wood (IRE); 1976	Cat O'Mountaine	Ragusa
Dam Kayu (IRE) 1985	Tap On Wood (IRE); 1976	Cat O'Mountaine	Marie Elizabeth
Dam Kayu (IRE) 1985	Ladytown (GB); 1980	English Prince	Petingo
Dam Kayu (IRE) 1985	Ladytown (GB); 1980	English Prince	English Miss
Dam Kayu (IRE) 1985	Ladytown (GB); 1980	Supreme Lady	Grey Sovereign
Dam Kayu (IRE) 1985	Ladytown (GB); 1980	Supreme Lady	Ulupis Sister (Family: 19)

* Vinnie Roe is inbred 4S x 4S to the stallion Lorenzaccio, meaning that he appears fourth generation twice on the sire side of his pedigree.

== Notes ==
^{1} The units used in the sales are unclear. Sources refer to Pounds, Irish Pounds and Guineas.
