= Relaxed Gesture =

Irish-bred Thoroughbred racehorse

- Sire: Indian Ridge
- Grandsire: Ahonoora
- Dam: Token Gesture
- Damsire: Alzao
- Sex: Stallion
- Foaled: 12 March 2001
- Died: October 2012
- Country: Ireland
- Colour: Chestnut
- Breeder: Moyglare Stud Farm
- Owner: Moyglare Stud Farm
- Trainer: Christophe Clement
- Record: 18: 4-6-3
- Earnings: £842,775

Major wins
- Canadian International Stakes (2005)

Relaxed Gesture (foaled March 12, 2001 in Ireland) was a thoroughbred racehorse known for winning the $2 million Canadian International Stakes in 2005. A chestnut stallion, he was bred and raced by Walter Haefner's Moyglare Stud Farm. Out of the mare, Token Gesture, his sire was Indian Ridge who also sired Breeders' Cup Mile winners, Ridgewood Pearl (1995 European Horse of the Year) and Domedriver, as well as Irish 2,000 Guineas winner, Indian Haven.

Trained by Christophe Clement, he was ridden to victory in the Canadian International by American jockey, Corey Nakatani.

Retired from racing in 2007, Relaxed Gesture stood at studs in the Czech Republic. The stallion had serious fertility problems due to the fact he produced only one foal a filly named Lailah (born 2008, out of the mare Latinita). Lailah is now retired from racing and stands in her home stud in Napajedla as broodmare.

Relaxed Gesture was euthanized in October 2012 because of health problems.
