= Compton Place (horse) =

British-bred Thoroughbred racehorse

- Sire: Indian Ridge
- Grandsire: Ahonoora
- Dam: Nosey
- Damsire: Nebbiolo
- Sex: Stallion
- Foaled: 20 April 1994
- Died: 21 September 2015
- Country: United States
- Colour: Chestnut
- Breeder: R. J. Turner
- Owner: Duke of Devonshire
- Trainer: James Toller
- Record: 12: 3-4-0
- Earnings: £141,621

Major wins
- July Cup (1997)

Compton Place (20 April 1994 – 21 September 2015) was a British Thoroughbred racehorse, best known for his 50/1 upset victory in the 1997 July Cup. As a juvenile in 1996 he won two minor races and finished second in both the Gimcrack Stakes and the Flying Childers Stakes. In the following year he was beaten in his first two starts before defeating a strong field including Royal Applause and Bahamian Bounty to win the July Cup. He failed to display his best form in four subsequent races and was retired in August 1998. He later became a successful breeding stallion.

== Background ==
Compton Place was a chestnut horse with a white blaze and three white socks bred in England by R. J. Turner. He was sired by Indian Ridge, a sprinter who won the King's Stand Stakes in 1989, before becoming a successful breeding stallion best known for siring the outstanding filly Ridgewood Pearl. Indian Ridge was a representative of the Byerley Turk sire line, unlike more than 95% of modern thoroughbreds, who descend directly from the Darley Arabian. Compton Place's dam, Nosey, won three races as a two-year-old in Ireland in 1983. She was a great-great granddaughter of Benane who was a half-sister of the St Leger winner Turkhan and the Ascot Gold Cup winner Ujiji.

As a yearling, the colt was sent to the Goffs sale in Ireland in October 1995 and was bought for IR£92,000 by the bloodstock agent Charles Gordon-Watson. Compton Place entered the ownership of Andrew Cavendish, 11th Duke of Devonshire and was sent into training with James Toller in Newmarket, Suffolk. The colt was named after Compton Place, a country house in East Sussex owned by the Dukes of Devonshire.

== Racing career ==
=== 1996: two-year-old season ===
Compton Place never contested a maiden race, making his debut in a minor stakes event over five furlongs at Bath Racecourse on 15 June and winning by a head from Ride Sally Ride. W J O'Connor rode the horse on this occasion but Seb Sanders partnered him in all his subsequent races. Three weeks later, Compton Place was moved up in class for the Listed Dragon Stakes at Sandown Park Racecourse and was beaten a head into second place by the filly Vax Star. On 1 August, the colt started 5/4 favourite against three opponents in a minor race at Salibury. After pulling hard in the early stages he took the lead at half way and won by two lengths from Dalmeny Dancer.

Three weeks after his win at Salisbury, Compton Place was moved up in class for the Group Two Gimcrack Stakes at York Racecourse. Starting a 12/1 outsider in a nine-runner field he led for most of the way before being overtaken in the closing stages and beaten half a length by Abou Zouz. The favourite The West finished third ahead of the Richmond Stakes winner Easycall. At Doncaster Racecourse in September, Compton Place started 9/4 favourite for the Group To Flying Childers Stakes over five furlongs. He led from the start but was headed by Easycall inside the final furlong and finished second, beaten a length and a half by the winner.

=== 1997: three-year-old season ===
Compton Place began his second season in the Achilles Stakes over five furlongs at Kempton Park Racecourse on 31 May. He started joint-favourite and raced prominently but was beaten two and a half lengths into second place by the four-year-old Almaty. Three weeks later, the colt was sent to Royal Ascot to contest the King's Stand Stakes over five furlongs on good to soft ground. After leading in the early stages he faded badly in the final furlong and finished twelfth of the eighteen runners behind the French-trained outsider Don't Worry Me.

On 10 July, Compton Place started a 50/1 outsider for the July Cup over six furlongs on firm ground at Newmarket Racecourse. The 11/10 favourite was Royal Applause whilst the other contenders were Bahamian Bounty, Blue Goblin, Indian Rocket (Mill Reef Stakes), Coastal Bluff (Ayr Gold Cup, Stewards' Cup), Easycall, Lucayan Prince (Jersey Stakes) and Rambling Bear (King George Stakes). The field initially split into two groups with Compton Place being restrained by Sanders behind Indian Rocket and Coastal Bluff who set the pace for the group on the far side (the left side from the jockey's viewpoint) whilst Royal Applause led on the stands side. At half way the two groups came together and Compton Place began to make rapid progress. He went to the front approaching the final furlong and won by one and three quarter lengths from Royal Applause, with Indian Rocket three lengths back in third.

On his only other start of the season, Compton Place started favourite for the Nunthorpe Stakes at York Racecourse in August. He started poorly and never looked likely to win, finishing fourteenth of the fifteen runners. He did not race again in 1997 as his connections waited for firm ground, which did not materialise.

=== 1998: four-year-old season ===
Compton Place remained in training as a four-year-old in 1998 but failed to recover his best form. On his first appearance of the year he finished sixth behind Bolshoi in the Temple Stakes and at Royal Ascot he finished last of the twelve runners in the Cork and Orrery Stakes. On his only other run he attempted to repeat his 1997 success in the July Cup as the Duke of Devonshire was determined to show that his upset win was not a "fluke", but he finished unplaced behind Elnadim. His retirement from racing was announced in August. Toller said "There is nothing worse than seeing a horse carrying on racing if he is not showing his best form... His July Cup form was the best last year by a sprinter. He was the only horse able to beat Royal Applause over six furlongs on grass. It's just a pity we weren't able to do it once more, to keep everyone quiet".

== Stud record ==
Compton Place was retired from racing to become a breeding stallion at the Whitsbury Manor Stud in Hampshire. He has had considerable success as a sire of sprinters with his offspring including Deacon Blues, Borderlescott, Pearl Secret (Temple Stakes), Intrepid Jack (Hackwood Stakes), Godfrey Street (Flying Childers Stakes), Boogie Street (Achilles Stakes), Passified (San Clemente Handicap) and Fortune Knight (Taranaki Stakes).

== Pedigree ==
Pedigree of Compton Place (GB), chestnut stallion, 1994
Sire Indian Ridge (IRE) 1985	Ahonoora (GB); 1975	Lorenzaccio	Klairon
Sire Indian Ridge (IRE) 1985	Ahonoora (GB); 1975	Lorenzaccio	Phoenissa
Sire Indian Ridge (IRE) 1985	Ahonoora (GB); 1975	Helen Nichols	Martial
Sire Indian Ridge (IRE) 1985	Ahonoora (GB); 1975	Helen Nichols	Quaker Girl
Sire Indian Ridge (IRE) 1985	Hillbrow (GB); 1975	Swing Easy	Delta Judge
Sire Indian Ridge (IRE) 1985	Hillbrow (GB); 1975	Swing Easy	Free Flowing
Sire Indian Ridge (IRE) 1985	Hillbrow (GB); 1975	Golden City	Skymaster
Sire Indian Ridge (IRE) 1985	Hillbrow (GB); 1975	Golden City	West Shaw
Dam Nosey (IRE) 1981	Nebbiolo (GB); 1974	Yellow God	Red God
Dam Nosey (IRE) 1981	Nebbiolo (GB); 1974	Yellow God	Sally Deans
Dam Nosey (IRE) 1981	Nebbiolo (GB); 1974	Novara	Birkhahn
Dam Nosey (IRE) 1981	Nebbiolo (GB); 1974	Novara	Norbelle
Dam Nosey (IRE) 1981	Little Cynthia (IRE); 1974	Wolver Hollow	Sovereign Path
Dam Nosey (IRE) 1981	Little Cynthia (IRE); 1974	Wolver Hollow	Cygnet
Dam Nosey (IRE) 1981	Little Cynthia (IRE); 1974	Fazilka	Crepello
Dam Nosey (IRE) 1981	Little Cynthia (IRE); 1974	Fazilka	Perbena (Family: 6-d)
