= Challenge Stakes (Ireland) =

Flat horse race in Ireland

Challenge Stakes
2026
Floresta	Goodie Two Shoes	Perfect Your Craft

Previous years
2025
Goodie Two Shoes	Drawn To Dream	Royal Entry
2024
Grateful	Dancing Tango	Magical Zoe
2023
Shamida	Divine Jewel	Scarlett O'Hara
2022
Rosscarbery	Emily Dickinson	Lady Hayes
2021
Believe In Love	Federica Sophia	Forbearance

2020-2011
2020
Passion	Traisha	Kastasa
2019
Peach Tree	Moteo	Cimeara
2018
Cimeara	Sizzling	Naughty Or Nice
2017
Wild Irish Rose	Wingingit	Tilly's Chilli
2016
Arya Tara	Avenante	Glenmayne
2015
Fields Of Athenry	Silwana	Drifting Mist
2014
Pale Mimosa	Manalapan	Mutual Regard
2013
Royal Diamond	Sir Ector	Unaccompanied
2012
Galileo's Choice	Aklan	Steps To Freedom
2011
Sense Of Purpose	Bob Le Beau	Fictional Account

2010-2000
2010
Profound Beauty	Drumfire	Unity
2009
Profound Beauty	Yankee Doodle	Aliyfa
2008
Profound Beauty	Galistic	Peppertree Lane
2007
Galistic	Reform Act	Princess Nala
2006
Foreign Affairs	Mkuzi	Simple Exchange
2005
Orpington	Dashing Home	Virginia Woolf
2004
Barolo	Two Miles West	Valentina Guest
2003
Blue Corrig	Handel	Cruzspiel
2002
Queens Wharf	Slaney Sand	Bowmore
2001
Vinnie Roe	Sadlers Wings	Fantasy Royale
2000
Pairumani Star	Royal Rebel	Dutch Harrier

The Challenge Stakes is a Group 3 flat horse race in Ireland open to fillies and mares aged three years or older. It is run at Leopardstown over a distance of 1 mile and 6 furlongs (2,816 metres), and it is scheduled to take place each year in July.

The race was first run in 1991 and was restricted to fillies and mares from 2016. Since 2016 the race has been run as the Stanerra Stakes. In 2018 it was upgraded from Listed to Group 3 status as part of changes to enhance the European programme of stayer's races.

== Records ==
Most successful horse (3 wins):

- Profound Beauty – 2008, 2009, 2010

Leading jockey (8 wins):

- Pat Smullen – Vinnie Roe (2001), Orpington (2005), Profound Beauty (2008, 2009, 2010), Sense Of Purpose (2011), Galileo's Choice (2012), Pale Mimosa (2014)

Leading trainer (9 wins):

- Dermot Weld – Vinnie Roe (2001), Orpington (2005), Profound Beauty (2008, 2009, 2010), Sense Of Purpose (2011), Galileo's Choice (2012), Pale Mimosa (2014), Shamida (2023)

== Winners ==
Year	Winner	Age	Jockey	Trainer	Time
2000	Pairumani Star	5	Pat Shanahan	John Dunlop	3:0.60
2001	Vinnie Roe	3	Pat Smullen	Dermot Weld	3:2.20
2002	Queens Wharf	4	Jerry O'Dwyer	Michael Halford	3:43.90
2003	Blue Corrig	3	Declan McDonogh	Joseph Crowley	3:00.70
2004	Barolo	5	Johnny Murtagh	Peter Harris	3:03.70
2005	Orpington	4	Pat Smullen	Dermot Weld	2:56.20
2006	Foreign Affairs	8	Declan McDonogh	Sir Mark Prescott	2:57.60
2007	Galistic	4	Danny Grant	Patrick J. Flynn	3:09.01
2008	Profound Beauty	4	Pat Smullen	Dermot Weld	2:55.00
2009	Profound Beauty	5	Pat Smullen	Dermot Weld	2:59.30
2010	Profound Beauty	6	Pat Smullen	Dermot Weld	3:04.82
2011	Sense Of Purpose	4	Pat Smullen	Dermot Weld	3:01.82
2012	Galileo's Choice	6	Pat Smullen	Dermot Weld	3:09.13
2013	Royal Diamond	7	Johnny Murtagh	Johnny Murtagh	2:59.65
2014	Pale Mimosa	5	Pat Smullen	Dermot Weld	2:59.63
2015	Fields Of Athenry	3	Seamie Heffernan	Aidan O'Brien	3:09.77
2016	Arya Tara	3	Anastasia O'Brien	Joseph O'Brien	3:09.35
2017	Wild Irish Rose	3	Seamie Heffernan	Aidan O'Brien	3:03.65
2018	Cimeara	3	Kevin Manning	Jim Bolger	3:08.44
2019	Peach Tree	3	Wayne Lordan	Aidan O'Brien	3:02.08
2020	Passion (Note: The 2020 running took place at Naas in August due to the COVID-19 pandemic in the Republic of Ireland)	3	Seamie Heffernan	Aidan O'Brien	3:18.85
2021	Believe In Love	4	Ronan Whelan	Roger Varian	3:03.52
2022	Rosscarbery	4	Billy Lee	Paddy Twomey	3:01.94
2023	Shamida	3	Chris Hayes	Dermot Weld	3:00.98
2024	Grateful (Note: The 2024 running took place at Fairyhouse)	3	Ronan Whelan	Aidan O'Brien	3:01.29
2025	Goodie Two Shoes (Note: The 2025 running took place at Fairyhouse)	6	Dylan Browne McMonagle	Joseph O'Brien	2:59.74
2026	Floresta (Note: The 2026 running took place at Fairyhouse)	4	Ben Coen	Johnny Murtagh	2:56.38

== See also ==
- Horse racing in Ireland
- List of Irish flat horse races
