= Dr Devious =

Irish-bred Thoroughbred racehorse

- Racing silks of Robert Sangster; Luciano Gaucci and Sidney H Craig
- Breed: Thoroughbred
- Sire: Ahonoora
- Grandsire: Lorenzaccio
- Dam: Rose of Jericho
- Damsire: Alleged
- Sex: Stallion
- Foaled: 10 March 1989
- Country: Ireland
- Colour: Chestnut
- Breeder: Lyonstown Stud
- Owner: Robert Sangster; Luciano Gaucci; Sidney H. Craig
- Trainer: Peter Chapple-Hyam
- Record: 15: 6-4-0
- Earnings: £812,294

Major wins
- Superlative Stakes (1991); Vintage Stakes (1991); Dewhurst Stakes (1991); Epsom Derby (1992); Irish Champion Stakes (1992)

Dr Devious (10 March 1989 – 7 March 2018) was an Irish-bred and British-trained Thoroughbred race horse and sire. In a career which lasted from May 1991 until November 1992, he ran fifteen times and won six races. He is most notable as the winner of the Epsom Derby in 1992. Dr Devious's other most significant wins came in the Dewhurst Stakes and the Irish Champion Stakes. He was the second horse, after Bold Arrangement in 1986, to run in both the Kentucky Derby and the Epsom Derby.

== Background ==
Bred by Lyonstown Stud, near Cashel, County Tipperary, Dr Devious was sired by Ahonoora out of the mare Rose of Jericho, a daughter of two-time Prix de l'Arc de Triomphe winner Alleged. As a son of Ahonoora, he is a representative of the Byerley Turk sire line, unlike more than 95% of modern thoroughbreds, who descend directly from the Darley Arabian. Rose of Jericho was an unraced mare who also produced the Greenlands Stakes winner Archway. He was purchased by Italian businessman Luciano Gaucci, owner of the Allevamento White Star breeding and racing operation who had had great success in the late 1980s with the colt Tony Bin. Dr Devious, reportedly named after a supervillain, was trained throughout his career by Peter Chapple-Hyam.

== Racing career ==
=== 1991: two-year-old season ===
In the spring of 1991, the two-year-old Dr Devious won the May Maiden Stakes at Newbury, then in June ran second in the Coventry Stakes at Royal Ascot. Ridden for the remainder of the year by Willie Carson, in July he won the Superlative Stakes at Newmarket and in August the Vintage Stakes at Goodwood Racecourse. The horse had been sold by Robert Sangster to Luciano Gaucci before the Vintage Stakes, but the agreement was that he would be leased back to Sangster for his next two races. Back at Newmarket, on 2 October he finished a head second to Young Senor in a crowded field in the Tiffany Highflyer Stakes then just over two weeks later (wearing the Gaucci colours for the first time) ran in the Group One seven furlong Dewhurst Stakes, Britain's most prestigious race for two-year-olds. He took the lead a furlong from the finish and won by two and a half lengths from Great Palm.

=== 1992: three-year-old season ===
American Jenny Craig purchased Dr Devious for a reported $2.5 million as a gift for her husband Sidney. In April 1992, Dr Devious finished second to Alnasr Alwasheek under the French-based American jockey Cash Asmussen in the Craven Stakes. In May of that year, the colt was shipped to Churchill Downs in Louisville, Kentucky, to compete in America's most prestigious horse race, the Kentucky Derby. Racing on dirt, Dr Devious finished seventh to winner Lil E. Tee. After the race, Sidney Craig asked the advice of his American trainer, Ron McAnally, who advised him that Dr Devious was a turf specialist and that he should send the colt back to England.

Dr Devious returned to England to run in the Epsom Derby on 3 June. Starting the 8/1 second favourite in a field of eighteen, he took the lead a furlong from the finish and held off the challenges of St Jovite and Silver Wisp to win by two lengths.

Three and a half weeks after his Epsom win, Dr Devious met St Jovite again in the Irish Derby at the Curragh. Dr Devious was made odds-on favourite but was never able to make a serious challenge to St Jovite, who won by twelve lengths in record time. Dr Devious finished fourth in the International Stakes at York in August and then ran against St Jovite for a third time in the Irish Champion Stakes over ten furlongs. The two horses raced head-to-head down the straight, with Dr Devious moving ahead near the post and winning by a short head.

Dr Devious ran three more times without recovering his best form. He finished sixth in the Prix de l'Arc de Triomphe, fourth in the Breeders' Cup Turf, and unplaced on his final start in the Japan Cup.

== Stud career ==
Retired to stud in Japan in 1993-96 and Coolmore Ireland in 1997–2001, he was eventually sent to Italy for stud duty at Allevamenti della Berardenga in 2002–16. Pensioned from stud duties in 2016, he was the leading sire in Italy on two occasions. His most successful offspring has been the gelding Collier Hill, a multiple winner of major international stakes whose victories include the 2004 and 2006 Stockholm Cup International, the 2005 Gerling-Preis and Irish St. Leger Stakes, and the 2006 Canadian International Stakes and Hong Kong Vase. He was also the sire of the Prix de l'Opéra winner Kinnaird. Dr Devious died in Sardinia on 7 March 2018.

== Pedigree ==
Pedigree of Dr Devious (IRE), chestnut stallion, 1989
Sire Ahonoora (GB) 1975	Lorenzaccio; 1965	Klairon	Clarion
Sire Ahonoora (GB) 1975	Lorenzaccio; 1965	Klairon	Kalmia
Sire Ahonoora (GB) 1975	Lorenzaccio; 1965	Phoenissa	The Phoenix
Sire Ahonoora (GB) 1975	Lorenzaccio; 1965	Phoenissa	Erica Fragrans
Sire Ahonoora (GB) 1975	Helen Nichols; 1966	Martial	Hill Gail
Sire Ahonoora (GB) 1975	Helen Nichols; 1966	Martial	Discipliner
Sire Ahonoora (GB) 1975	Helen Nichols; 1966	Quaker Girl	Whistler
Sire Ahonoora (GB) 1975	Helen Nichols; 1966	Quaker Girl	Mayflower
Dam Rose of Jericho (USA) 1984	Alleged; 1974	Hoist the Flag	Tom Rolfe
Dam Rose of Jericho (USA) 1984	Alleged; 1974	Hoist the Flag	Wavy Navy
Dam Rose of Jericho (USA) 1984	Alleged; 1974	Princess Pout	Prince John
Dam Rose of Jericho (USA) 1984	Alleged; 1974	Princess Pout	Determined Lady
Dam Rose of Jericho (USA) 1984	Rose Red; 1979	Northern Dancer	Nearctic
Dam Rose of Jericho (USA) 1984	Rose Red; 1979	Northern Dancer	Natalma
Dam Rose of Jericho (USA) 1984	Rose Red; 1979	Cambrienne	Sicambre
Dam Rose of Jericho (USA) 1984	Rose Red; 1979	Cambrienne	Torbella (Family: 1-t)
