= Domedriver =

Irish-bred Thoroughbred racehorse

- Sire: Indian Ridge
- Grandsire: Ahonoora
- Dam: Napoli
- Damsire: Baillamont
- Sex: Stallion
- Foaled: 1998
- Country: Ireland
- Colour: Dark Bay/Brown
- Breeder: Stavros Niarchos family
- Owner: Stavros Niarchos family
- Trainer: Pascal Bary
- Record: 21: 6-5-3
- Earnings: £677,020

Major wins
- Prix Isonomy (2000); Prix de Tourgeville (2001); Prix du Chemin de Fer du Nord (2002); Prix Daniel Wildenstein (2002) Breeders' Cup wins: Breeders' Cup Mile (2002)

Awards
- French Champion Older Miler (2002)

Domedriver (foaled 1998 in Ireland) is a Thoroughbred racehorse owned and raced in France by the Stavros Niarchos family. Out of the mare, Napoli, his sire was Indian Ridge who also sired Breeders' Cup winner and 1995 European Horse of the Year, Ridgewood Pearl and Relaxed Gesture, winner of the $2 million Canadian International, as well as Irish 2,000 Guineas winner, Indian Haven.

At the 2002 Breeders' Cup races at Arlington Park near Chicago, Illinois, Domedriver earned the most important win of his career. Jockey Thierry Thulliez, riding in his first ever Breeders' Cup race, guided Domedriver to an upset win over the heavily favored Rock of Gibraltar who had come into the race having won a world record seven straight Group One races.

Domedriver raced from age two through age five before being retired to stud. He stands at Lanwades Stud in Newmarket, Suffolk, England which has sent him to stand in France for the 2009 season.
