= Remember Rose =

Irish-bred Thoroughbred racehorse

- Sire: Insatiable
- Grandsire: Don't Forget Me
- Dam: Couture Rose
- Damsire: Ajraas
- Sex: Gelding
- Foaled: 25 February 2003
- Country: Ireland
- Colour: Bay
- Breeder: Ernst Iten new owner
- Owner: Ernst Iten
- Trainer: Jean-Paul Gallorini
- Jockey: Christophe Pieux
- Record: 25: 8-3-2
- Earnings: EUR 1,485,075

Major wins
- Grand Steeple-Chase de Paris (2009); Prix La Haye Jousselin (2008, 2009); Prix Ferdinand Dufaure (2007)

Remember Rose (born 25 February 2003) is an Irish racehorse, by Insatiable out of Couture Rose, bred and owned by Ernst Iten and trained by Jean-Paul Gallorini. He won the 2009 Grand Steeple-Chase de Paris, ridden by Christophe Pieux. He has won eight of his 25 starts.
