= Cape of Good Hope (horse) =

British-bred Thoroughbred racehorse

Cape of Good Hope (GB)
- Sire: Inchinor
- Grandsire: Ahonoora
- Dam: Cape Merino
- Damsire: Clantime
- Sex: Gelding
- Foaled: 1998
- Country: Britain
- Colour: Chestnut
- Breeder: Mrs. D. Ellis
- Owner: Exors of the late R. Carstairs
- Trainer: David Oughton
- Record: 44: 7 - 7 - 10
- Earnings: $HKD21,993,575
- Last updated on 29 March 2008

Cape of Good Hope (GB) (好望角, foaled 1998) is a British thoroughbred racehorse based in Hong Kong. Sired by Inchinor to dam Cape Merino, the chestnut gelding was trained by David Oughton. Despite being overshadowed by champion sprinter Silent Witness in Hong Kong, Cape of Good Hope had some success on international stages.

In 2005, he became the champion of the inaugural Global Sprint Challenge series by winning the Australia Stakes (now William Reid Stakes) in Australia and Golden Jubilee Stakes in the United Kingdom respectively.

== Career highlights ==
- 1st – 2005 Australia Stakes (Now named William Reid Stakes) (G1)
- 1st – 2005 Golden Jubilee Stakes (G1)
- 2nd – 2004 Hong Kong Sprint (G1)
- 3rd – 2006 Lightning Stakes (G1)
- 3rd – 2005 Salinger Stakes (G1)
- 3rd – 2005 Lightning Stakes (G1)
- 3rd – 2004 Sprinters Stakes, Japan (G1)
- 3rd – 2004 Golden Jubilee Stakes (G1)
- 3rd – 2003 Hong Kong Sprint (G1)
