= Deacon Blues (horse) =

British Thoroughbred racehorse

- Sire: Compton Place
- Grandsire: Indian Ridge
- Dam: Persario
- Damsire: Bishop Of Cashel
- Sex: Gelding
- Foaled: 19 February 2007
- Country: Great Britain
- Colour: Bay
- Breeder: Mr & Mrs K W Grundy; Jan & Peter Hopper
- Owner: Jan & Peter Hopper; Michelle Morris
- Trainer: James Fanshawe
- Record: 16: 7-4-2
- Earnings: £326,171

Major wins
- Wokingham Stakes (2011); Hackwood Stakes (2011); Phoenix Sprint Stakes (2011); World Trophy (2011); British Champions Sprint Stakes (2011)

Deacon Blues (foaled 19 February 2007) is a Thoroughbred racehorse owned by Jan and Peter Hopper and Michelle Morris. Trained by James Fanshawe in Newmarket, he enjoyed a successful career, particularly as a four-year-old when he won five of his six starts which were all in either handicap or group company. Among the most notable achievements in his career include winning the Wokingham Stakes at Royal Ascot and the Group 2 British Champions Sprint Stakes by 1 ½ lengths, also at Ascot.

== Racing career ==
=== Two-year-old season ===
Deacon Blues made his racing debut on October 7, 2009, in a six furlong maiden race at Nottingham. Ridden by George Baker, he finished fifth at odds of 25/1 but showed some early promise by staying on well in the closing stages. He then turned out at Leicester 19 days later and won his first ever race, the EBF Fosse Way Maiden Stakes, by 1 ¼ lengths, as the well supported 7/4 favourite.

=== Three-year-old season ===
He made his three-year-old debut in a handicap at Doncaster on April 17, 2010, where he finished third at odds of 5/1. He went one better next time out, finishing second at Nottingham, before he gained his first victory of the season in taking style at Yarmouth in June. However, that was to be his only win as a three-year-old as he started to earn a reputation for being an unlucky sprinter, with placed efforts in three of his next five starts in 2010.

=== Four-year-old season ===
Deacon Blues made his seasonal re-appearance in a big field handicap at Ascot in May, where he finished runner-up by a neck to Imperial Guest. However, that was to be his only defeat as a four year-old. First he landed the Wokingham Stakes at Royal Ascot with an impressive turn of foot – a performance which hinted that a step up to group company could be in the offing. He duly obliged in the Group 3 Shadwell Stakes at Newbury on his next appearance, winning comfortably by 2 ¾ lengths from Markab. He then thrashed a small field by seven lengths in the Phoenix Sprint Stakes at the Curragh before returning to Newbury in September to land another Group 3, this time the Dubai International World Trophy over five furlongs. His final start of the season was in the Group 2 British Champions Sprint Stakes, the biggest race of his career to date. He was sent off the 5/2 favourite and didn’t disappoint, winning by 1 ½ lengths to cap a memorable season.

=== Injury ===
In March 2012, Deacon Blues suffered a tendon injury which ruled him out of the entire 2012 season. He sustained a small tear in his near fore tendon, and he was given an estimated recovery time of one year.

Two weeks before a possible tilt at the Diamond Jubilee Stakes at Royal Ascot in June 2013, he suffered another tendon injury which led to connections retiring him at the age of six.
