= Hill Gail =

American-bred Thoroughbred racehorse

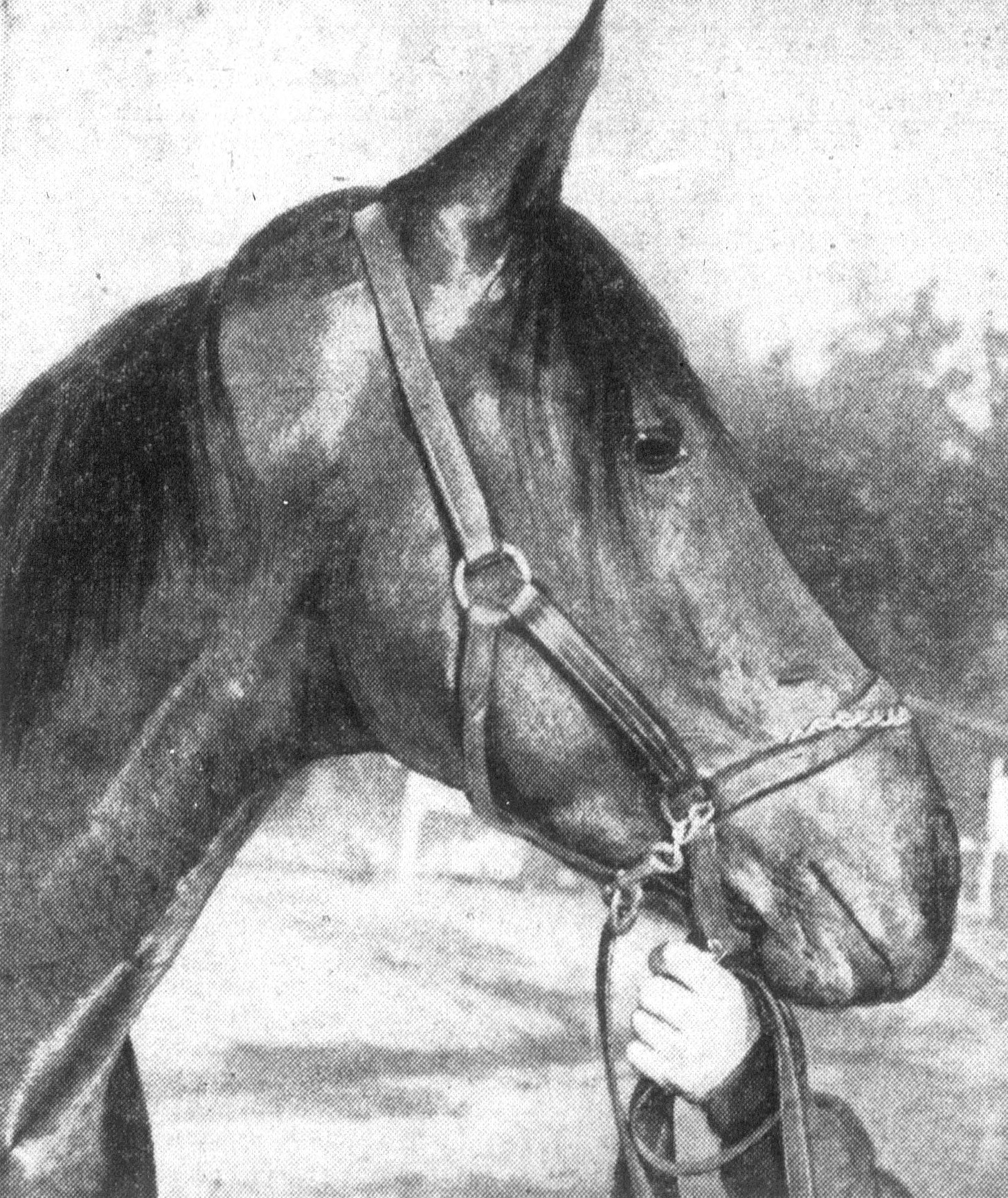
- Gail, circa 1953
- Sire: Bull Lea
- Grandsire: Bull Dog
- Dam: Jane Gail
- Damsire: Blenheim
- Sex: Stallion
- Foaled: 1949
- Country: United States
- Colour: Bay
- Breeder: Calumet Farm
- Owner: Calumet Farm
- Trainer: Ben A. Jones & Horace A. Jones
- Record: 32: 11-5-3
- Earnings: $335,625

Major wins
- Arlington Futurity (1951); Phoenix Handicap (1952); San Vicente Stakes (1952); Santa Anita Derby (1952); Derby Trial (1952); Kentucky Derby (1952)

Hill Gail (April 19, 1949 – May 27, 1968) was an American Thoroughbred racehorse. One of the leading American two-year-olds of 1951, Hill Gail recorded his most important success the following spring when he won the 1952 Kentucky Derby. He was injured during the race and was never as effective in his subsequent racing career. He was retired to stand as a breeding stallion in Ireland, where he had limited success as a sire.

== Background ==
Hill Gail was a dark bay horse bred and raced by Calumet Farm of Lexington, Kentucky. He was sired by Champion sire Bull Lea out of Jane Gail, a successful but temperamental racemare described by her trainer Jimmy Jones as "a well-authenticated bitch". As a descendant of the broodmare St Angela, Jane Gail was distantly related to the British champion St. Simon and Orme.

Hill Gail was trained by Ben Jones for races in the East while his son Jimmy handled the colt's conditioning in California.

== Racing career ==
At age two, Hill Gail set a new Arlington Park track record for six furlongs when winning the 1951 Arlington Futurity, the most valuable two-year-old race of the season. In October, Hill Gail recorded an upset victory over the year's leading colt Tom Fool in a sprint race at Belmont Park, but was beaten by the same colt in the Belmont Futurity five days later.

In early 1952, Hill Gail equaled the Keeneland Race Course record for six furlongs in winning the 1952 Phoenix Handicap but was twice defeated by the Irish colt Windy City. In the Santa Anita Derby however, he reversed the form to beat Windy City by four lengths. Hill Gail set a new Churchill Downs track record of 1:34.4 for eight furlongs when winning the Derby Trial by six lengths, and became only one of five horses to win both the Derby Trial and the Kentucky Derby. With Tom Fool ruled out by illness, Hill Gail became the popular choice for the Kentucky Derby.

Hill Gail, ridden by the veteran jockey Eddie Arcaro, started betting favorite for the Kentucky Derby, which was broadcast across America on live television for the first time and had the largest crowd to date at 110,000. When Hill Gail began to misbehave in the paddock before the race, Ben Jones reportedly calmed the horse by punching him on the nose. Eddie Arcaro sent the colt to the front after half a mile and Hill Gail produced what was described as a "stupendous burst of speed" to open up a six length advantage by the time the runners rounded the final turn. The outsider Sub Fleet emerged as a challenger in the stretch and Arcaro had to resort to his whip to ensure that Hill Gail reached the wire two lengths in front of Sub Fleet, with the second favorite Blue Man in third. The win gave Arcaro a record fifth Kentucky Derby, whilst trainer Ben Jones was winning the race for a sixth time, also a record. The winning time of 2:01 3/5 was the second fastest time to date. Hill Gail sustained a leg injury in the Derby which prevented him from running in the Preakness and Belmont Stakes.

Racing at age four and again at age five, Hill Gail met with modest success, but did not win a significant Graded stakes race. At the end of the 1954 racing season, he was retired from racing.

== Stud record ==
In 1954, Hill Gail was sold for $150,000 and exported to be sent to Ireland where he stood as a stallion at the Brownstown Stud. The most successful of Hill Gail's offspring was Martial who won the Classic 2000 Guineas in 1960. However, Hill Gail's other offspring met with only limited success in racing on European grass surfaces. He died there in 1968. A plaque to his memory is in the Calumet Farm horse cemetery.

== Pedigree ==
Pedigree of Hill Gail (USA) bay horse 1949
Sire Bull Lea (USA) 1935	Bull Dog	Teddy	Ajax
Sire Bull Lea (USA) 1935	Bull Dog	Teddy	Rondeau
Sire Bull Lea (USA) 1935	Bull Dog	Plucky Liege	Spearmint
Sire Bull Lea (USA) 1935	Bull Dog	Plucky Liege	Concertina
Sire Bull Lea (USA) 1935	Rose Leaves	Ballot	Voter
Sire Bull Lea (USA) 1935	Rose Leaves	Ballot	Cerito
Sire Bull Lea (USA) 1935	Rose Leaves	Colonial	Trenton
Sire Bull Lea (USA) 1935	Rose Leaves	Colonial	Thankful Blossom
Dam Jane Gail (USA) 1944	Blenheim	Blandford	Swynford
Dam Jane Gail (USA) 1944	Blenheim	Blandford	Blanche
Dam Jane Gail (USA) 1944	Blenheim	Malva	Charles O'Malley
Dam Jane Gail (USA) 1944	Blenheim	Malva	Wild Arum
Dam Jane Gail (USA) 1944	Lady Higloss	Ladkin	Fair Play
Dam Jane Gail (USA) 1944	Lady Higloss	Ladkin	Lading
Dam Jane Gail (USA) 1944	Lady Higloss	Hi Gloss	High Time
Dam Jane Gail (USA) 1944	Lady Higloss	Hi Gloss	Sunglow (family 11-c)
