= Byerley Turk =

Founding stallion of the Thoroughbred breed

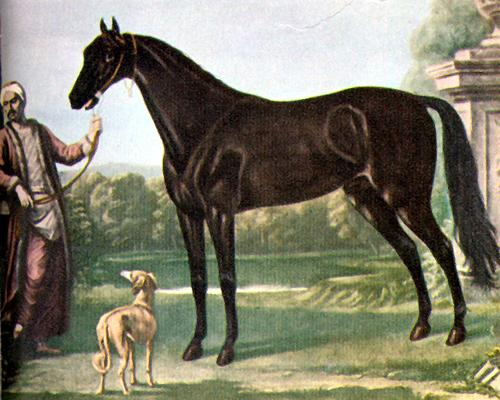
The Byerley Turk by John Wootton

The Byerley Turk (c. 1680 – c. 1703), also spelled Byerly Turk, was the earliest of three stallions that were the founders of the modern Thoroughbred horse racing bloodstock (the other two are the Godolphin Arabian and the Darley Arabian).

== Background ==
The biographical details of the stallion are the subject of much speculation. The entry in the General Stud Book simply states: "BYERLY TURK, was Captain Byerly's [sic] charger in Ireland, in King William's wars (1689, &c.)." As for his earlier history, the most popular theory is that the horse was captured at the Battle of Buda (1686) along with the Lister Turk, who was brought to England by the Duke of Berwick. Other sources speculate he was one of three Turkish stallions captured at the Battle of Vienna. It is even possible he was bred in England from previously imported stock. He was definitely the war horse of Captain Robert Byerley, who was dispatched to Ireland in 1689 during King William's War and saw further military service in the Battle of the Boyne. According to early records, Captain Byerley was nearly captured while reconnoitering the enemy, "owing his safety to the superior speed of his horse".

As a general rule, the spelling of a name registered with the Jockey Club is considered definitive, even if it is an obvious error. However, the original edition of the General Stud Book was compiled nearly a century after the fact (in 1791) and contains several errors that have been subsequently corrected. Most sources consider the correct spelling of the horse's name to follow the correct spelling of the owner's name, Byerley.

The Byerley Turk was a dark brown or black horse of unknown breeding, but described in historic accounts as an Arabian. At the time, Turkish horses were described as descended from "those of Arabia or Persia", but stated that they were longer in the body and of a larger size. He was described as a horse of elegance, courage and speed. Many of his offspring were also noted to have been either bay or black.

== Stud record ==
In 1692, Captain Byerley married his cousin, Mary Wharton (sole heir to the estate of Goldsborough, near Knaresborough, North Yorkshire, England) and moved to live with her at her family home of Goldsborough Hall. After Byerley retired (as Colonel Byerley), the Byerley Turk retired to stud, first at Middridge Grange, then, from 1697, at Goldsborough Hall. The Byerley Turk died there in 1703 and it is believed he is buried close to the Hall. Goldsborough Hall is now a private family home that offers accommodation, which includes the commemorative Byerley suite.

He did not cover many well-bred mares, but his most significant sons include:

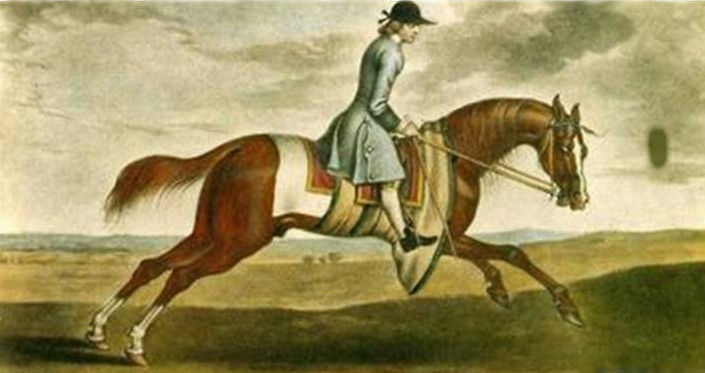
Partner, grandson of the Byerley Turk, grandsire of Herod

- Black Hearty, black colt born c. 1695, "a famous Horse of Sir George Fletcher"
- Grasshopper or Bristol Grasshopper, c. 1695, won the Town Plate at Nottingham under 10 stone
- Jigg, c. 1701, a bay colt of middling ability who became the sire of Partner, a four-time leading sire. Partner sired Tartar, who was the sire of Herod (1738). Herod founded one of the three sire lines from which all modern Thoroughbreds descend, the other lines being founded by Eclipse and Matchem.
- Basto, a nearly black colt born c. 1704, who won several match races from 1708 to 1710. Basto sired Old Ebony, the foundation mare of family #5. (Note: Note that "family" refers to matrilineal descent, while "sire line" refers to patrilineal descent.)

The Byerley Turk also sired several highly influential daughters, most of whose names do not survive. They are generally classified by the female family that they belong to:

- Byerley Turk mare, a black or brown daughter out of Tarfollet Barb mare, through whom all modern members of family #1 descend. Family 1 is estimated to account for 15% of all thoroughbreds, and has been divided into several sub-families for ease of reference. For example, family 1-k, the family of Frankel among many others, traces back through several branches to family 1-a, Bonny Lass, a grand-daughter of the Byerley Turk mare. As of 2010, there were 33 Epsom Derby winners, 31 St. Leger winners, and 40 winners of The Oaks Stakes listed in family 1 as descendants of the Byerley Turk mare
- Bowes' Byerley Turk mare, the "Dam of the Two True Blues", the taproot of family 3. Though not as widespread as family 1, many classic winners around the world trace back to family 3. As of 2010, there were 25 Derby winners, 26 Oaks winners and 20 St Leger winners from family 3
- The Byerley Turk mare out of Bustler Mare, the taproot of family 8, which has produced 7 Oaks winners, 11 Derby winners, and 15 St Leger winners including Nijinsky
- The Byerley Turk mare that was the taproot of family 17, which has produced 2 Oaks and 3 St Leger winners
- The Byerley Turk mare that was the taproot of family 41

== Byerley Turk sire line ==
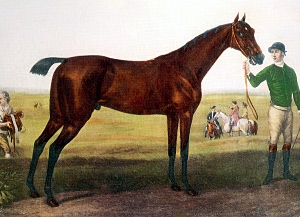
Herod (King Herod)

The Byerley sire line persisted by producing a major sire every few generations, whose sons would create branches of their own. Most of these branches have died out over the course of time. The line of descent to the present day is as follows:

- The Byerley Turk (~1680) sired Jigg in 1705, who sired Partner in 1718, who sired Tartar in 1743, who sired Herod in 1758. Herod was the leading sire in Great Britain and Ireland from 1777 to 1784.
- Herod sired Highflyer in 1774, leading sire in Great Britain from 1785-1796. Highflyer's line persisted for many generations but died out in the first half of the 20th century.
- Herod also sired Florizel born in 1768, who sired Diomed (1777). Diomed would become a foundation sire of the American turf. In turn, Diomed sired Sir Archy who was the first great "sire of sires" in the United States. A few generations later through Sir Archy's line came Lexington who became the leading sire in North America sixteen times in the mid-19th century, but his sire line died out in the late 20th century.

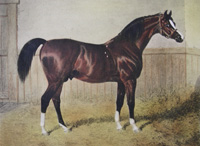
Sultan

- Herod's line continued through Woodpecker, foaled in 1773, who sired Buzzard (1787). Buzzard founded several sire lines that flourished in the 19th century, most of which withered away in the 20th century. Buzzard's sire line continued through Selim, foaled in 1802, who was leading sire of 1814. Selim produced yet another flourishing sire line, most of which died away by the mid 20th century. Selim's sire line continued through Sultan, born in 1816. Sultan was leading sire 6 times.

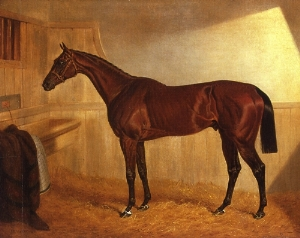
Bay Middleton

- Sultan in turn sired Bay Middleton (1833), who was leading sire in 1844 and 1849. Bay Middleton sired several sire sons but most of his line died out by the middle of the 20th century. Bay Middleton's sire line continued through The Flying Dutchman, born in 1846. The Flying Dutchman sired several sons whose lines gradually died out over the course of the 20th century. The Flying Dutchman's line continued through Dollar in 1860, who sired Androcles in 1870, who sired Cambyse in 1884, who sired Gardefeu in 1895, who sired Chouberski in 1902, who sired Bruleur in 1910. Bruleur sired Ksar in 1918.

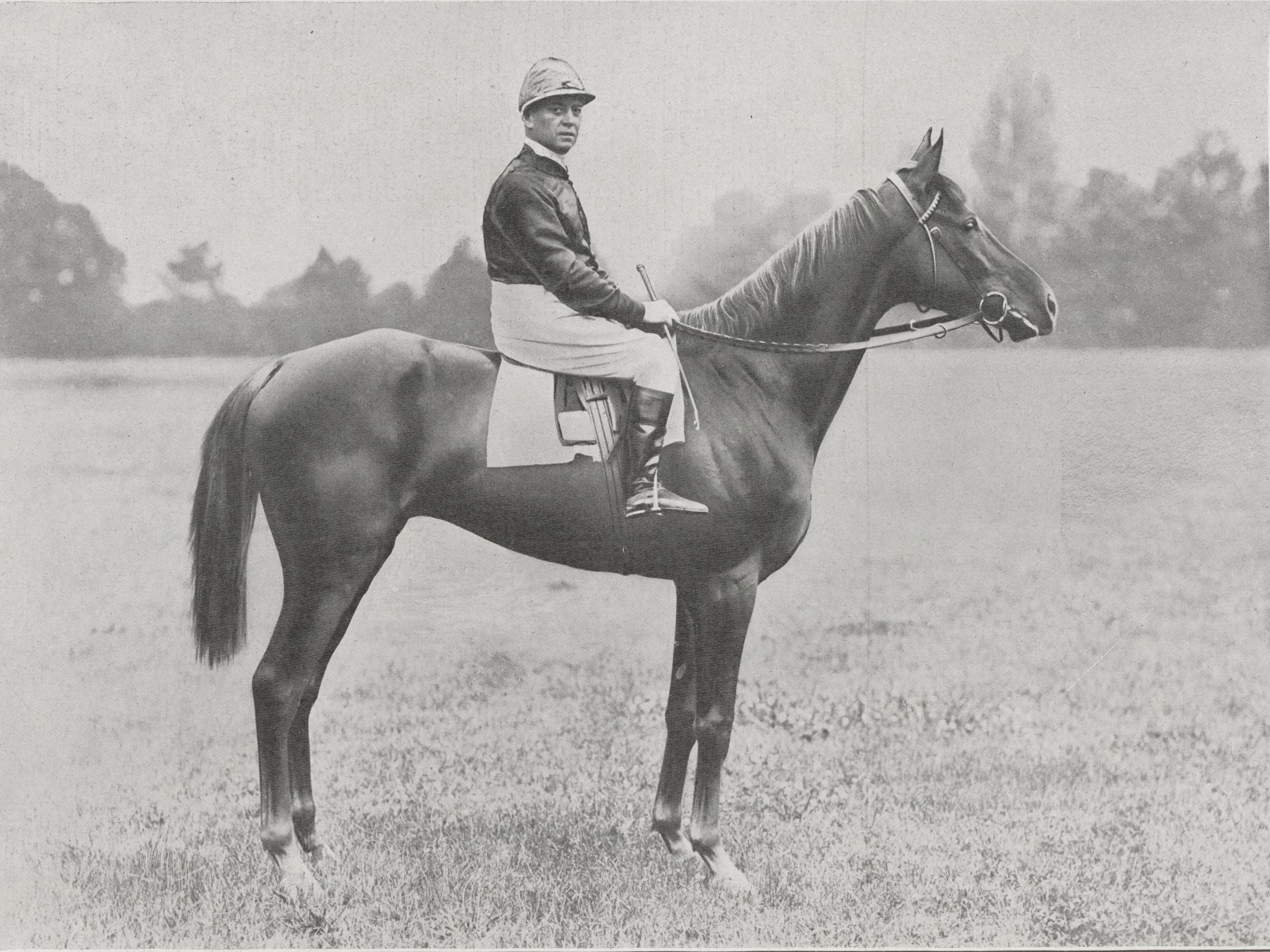
Ksar, 1921

- Ksar was a two-time winner of the Arc de Triomphe and the leading sire in France for 1931. Ksar sired Tourbillon in 1928. Tourbillon was three-time leading sire in France. As recently as the 1982 stallion register, four sons of Tourbillon were known to have active stallions (Ambiorix, Coaraze, Djebel, and Timor). However, Tourbillon's sire line has not had a stallion in the top 100 turf horses as recently as 2018.
- Djebel sired My Babu, who also won the 2000 Guineas. The My Babu sire line persisted for several generations, leading to Cirrus des Aigles, a Group 1 winner as late as 2014. Cirrus des Aigles was gelded so the My Babu sire line is on the brink of extinction, though as of 2023, sire Bulleton (Australia, 2003) still serves mares in N.S.W., Australia. His sire is Rubiton, by Century, by Better Boy (Ireland, 1951). Better Boy was 4-time Champion Sire in Australia (1965-66, 1970-71, 1971-72 and 1976-77), Sired 35 stakes winners and was Champion Broodmare Sire in Australia 1978-79. In addition, Japanese horse racing fans have attempted to keep the sire line of Tokai Teio (who is a direct descendant to My Babu through his son Milesian’s line) alive by means of crowdfunding, through his son Quite Fine.
- Djebel also sired Clarion, born in 1944, who, though less successful than My Babu on the track, is the best hope for the survival of the Byerley Turk sire line. Clarion sired Klairon in 1952, whose son Luthier would lead the french sire list four times. Luthier's sire line continued for a few generations but seems to have died out. Klairon also sired Lorenzaccio in 1965, who in turn sired Ahonoora in 1975. Ahonoora proved a very successful sire, with offspring including: Don't Forget Me (2000 Guineas), Dr Devious (Epsom Derby), and Indian Ridge. The Indian Ridge line has hopes primarily through the lineage of three sons: Compton Place (1994), Indian Rocket (1994), and Indian Haven (2000). Pearl Secret (son of Compton Place) is at stud in Japan, and Captain Chop (son of Indian Rocket) is at stud in France, while Indian Haven was at stud in Ireland until his death in 2023.
- A minor Byerley-descended stallion was known to be in South America as recently as 2021, but wasn’t covering many mares.

Thus the continuation of the Byerley Turk Thoroughbred sire line via Herod now largely depends on the descendants of Djebel, primarily through four descendants of his son Clarion (Captain Chop, Indian Haven, Pearl Secret, and Luck Money via the Indian Ridge line), secondarily through two descendants of his son My Babu (Bulleton via the Better Boy line, and Quite Fine via the Milesian line), and a minor Byerley Turk descended sire in South America.

Of special note, a direct male descendant by the name of Gem Twist, a three-time American Grand Prix Association champion Thoroughbred show jumper, had two clones produced that have successfully produced offspring as recently as 2012. The clones and any offspring of them are not considered Thoroughbreds however, as the breed requires procreation by natural means. Genetic studies have also identified the Byerley Turk's male-line descendants as belonging to a distinct Y-chromosome lineage within the Thoroughbred population.

Focusing on the sire line underestimates the ongoing influence of the Byerley Turk: detailed pedigree analysis shows that he has a higher percentage of blood in the modern Thoroughbred than either of his fellow foundation sires through other lines of descent. Furthermore, the influence of the Byerley Turk has been felt through other horse breeds through his direct male descendants Diomed (American Quarter Horse and Standardbred), Denmark (American Saddlebred), and Justin Morgan (Morgan horse). In fact, Denmark, Justin Morgan, and Sir Archy (son of Diomed), are key foundation sires for their respective breeds. Therefore, the Byerley Turk overall sire line lives on today more prominently through the American Quarter Horse, American Saddlebred, and Morgan horse than the Thoroughbred.

=== Sire line tree ===
Byerley Turk descendants (click to expand)
- Byerley Turk
  - Archer
  - Black Hearty
  - Grasshopper
  - Sprite
  - Jigg
    - Son of Jigg
    - Partner (Old)
      - Partner (Grisewood)
      - Partner (Moore)
        - Grey Spot
      - Cato
      - Little John
      - Spectre
      - Sedbury
        - Soldier
        - Alfred
        - Tantivy
      - Golden Ball
      - Merry Andrew
      - Badger
      - Tartar
        - Miner
        - Beaufremont
        - Herod
        - Tartar (Wildman)
      - Traveller (Old)
        - Dainty Davy
        - Squirrel
      - Traveller (Morton)
        - Ariel
        - Partner (Lightfoot)
        - Yorick
        - Bellair
        - Silverlegs
        - Tristram Shandy
        - Traveller (Lloyd)
    - Jigg (Heneage)
    - Robinson Crusoe
    - Shock
      - Shock
      - Bolton
  - Basto
    - Soreheels
      - Grey Soreheels
    - Little Scar

== See also ==
- List of historical horses

== Bibliography ==
- The Byerley Turk by Jeremy James, publ. Merlin Unwin Books, ISBN 978-1-873674-98-7 is a fictionalized account of the life of the Byerley Turk. It describes the Battle of Vienna and the Battle of Buda (1686), with a Turkish perspective.
- Whyte, James Christie (1840). History of the British turf, from the earliest period to the present day, Volume I. London: H. Colburn. OL 6544990M.
- The Horse as a Cultural Icon: The Real and the Symbolic Horse in the Early Modern World edited by Peter Edwards, Karl A E Enenkel and Elspeth Graham, publ. BRILL 14 Oct 2011. The chapter by Richard Nash Beware a Bastard Breed - Notes Towards a Revisionist History Of The Thoroughbred Racehorse details Nash's research into the origins of the Byerley Turk.
