= Ridgewood Pearl =

British-bred Thoroughbred racehorse

- Sire: Indian Ridge
- Grandsire: Ahonoora
- Dam: Ben's Pearl
- Damsire: Tap On Wood
- Sex: Mare
- Foaled: 1992
- Country: Great Britain
- Colour: Chestnut
- Breeder: Sean Coughlan
- Owner: Anne Coughlan
- Trainer: John Oxx
- Record: 8: 6-1-1
- Earnings: US$1,179,371 (equivalent)

Major wins
- C. L. Weld Park Stakes (1994); Athasi Stakes (1995); Irish 1,000 Guineas (1995); Coronation Stakes (1995); Prix du Moulin de Longchamp (1995); Breeders' Cup wins: Breeders' Cup Mile (1995)

Awards
- Cartier Champion Three-year-old Filly (1995); European Horse of the Year (1995)

Honours
- Ridgewood Pearl Stakes at the Curragh
- Last updated on September 13, 2008

Ridgewood Pearl (1992–2003) was an Irish-based Thoroughbred racehorse who in 1995 won four Group/Grade 1 races in four countries including over male horses in the Breeders' Cup Mile at Belmont Park in Elmont, New York.

The filly was bred by Sean Couglan and raced by his wife, Anne.

Ridgewood Pearl was retired to broodmare duty and produced five foals before dying in 2003 as a result of hemorrhaging after producing a dead foal.
