= Martial (horse) =

Irish-bred Thoroughbred racehorse

- Sire: Hill Gail
- Grandsire: Bull Lea
- Dam: Discipliner
- Damsire: Court Martial
- Sex: Stallion
- Foaled: 1957
- Country: Ireland
- Colour: Chestnut
- Breeder: Captain A. D. Rogers
- Owner: Reginald N. Webster
- Trainer: Paddy Prendergast
- Record: 7: 3-2-?

Major wins
- Coventry Stakes (1959); 2000 Guineas Stakes (1960)

Awards
- Timeform rating 131

Martial (1957–1977) was an Irish Thoroughbred racehorse. In 1960 he became the first horse trained in Ireland to win the British Classic 2000 Guineas Stakes.

== Background ==
Martial, a massive chestnut horse, was bred by Captain A. D. Rogers' Airlie Stud in Ireland. He was by far the most successful horse sired by the 1952 Kentucky Derby winner, Hill Gail. Martial's dam Discipliner showed no talent as a racehorse but was an excellent broodmare: in addition to Martial she produced the leading sprinters Skymaster (Stewards' Cup) and El Gallo (Cork and Orrery Stakes). His damsire Court Martial defeated Dante in the 1945 2000 Guineas and was twice the Leading sire in Great Britain & Ireland.

As a yearling, Martial was sent to the September sales in Dublin, where he was bought for 2,400 guineas by the trainer Paddy Prendergast on behalf of the American financier Reginald N. Webster.

== Racing career ==
As a two-year-old, Martial showed promise when winning a race at the Curragh and then traveling to England to contest the Coventry Stakes at Royal Ascot. Martial won the race but was badly jarred by running on the exceptionally firm ground and did not race again that season.

Martial's early form in 1960 was not impressive. He finished unplaced in a race at Phoenix Park and then ran second in the Classic Trial at Thirsk. In the 2000 Guineas at Newmarket Racecourse, Martial, ridden by the Australian jockey Ron Hutchinson, started an 18/1 outsider in a field of seventeen runners. The field split into two groups across the wide Rowley Mile course and in the final furlong Martial and the French-trained colt Venture broke clear of their respective groups to dispute the finish. Martial won by a head, becoming the first Irish-trained colt to win the race in its 152-year history. After the 2000 Guineas, Martial had training problems and ran only once more. In July at Goodwood, Martial finished second to Venture in the Sussex Stakes when carrying six pounds more than the winner.

== Assessment and honours ==
The independent Timeform organisation gave Martial a rating of 131.

In their book, A Century of Champions, based on the Timeform rating system, John Randall and Tony Morris rated Martial an "average" winner of the 2000 Guineas.

== Stud record ==
Martial was retired to stud in 1961 and eventually exported to Argentina. His offspring met with limited success in racing, but he had some long-term influence through his daughter Helen Nichols who produced the successful sire Ahonoora.
