= 2009 King George VI and Queen Elizabeth Stakes =

59th King George VI and Queen Elizabeth Stakes
- King George VI and Queen Elizabeth Stakes
- Conduit Tartan Bearer Ask
- Location: Ascot Racecourse
- Date: 25 July 2009
- Winning horse: Conduit (IRE)
- Jockey: Ryan Moore
- Trainer: Michael Stoute (GB)
- Owner: Ballymacoll Stud

The 2009 King George VI and Queen Elizabeth Stakes was a horse race held at Ascot Racecourse on Saturday 25 July 2009. It was the 59th King George VI and Queen Elizabeth Stakes.

The winner was the Ballymacoll Stud's Conduit, a four-year-old chestnut colt trained at Newmarket, Suffolk by Michael Stoute and ridden by Ryan Moore. Conduit's victory was the first for his jockey and the fourth for Stoute after Shergar (1981), Opera House (1993) and Golan (2002). He was the first King George winner to officially race for Ballymacoll Stud although Troy, Ela-Mana-Mou and Golan had won in the same colours.

== The contenders ==
The race attracted nine runners with Michael Stoute and Aidan O'Brien each fielding three runners. The Stoute team consisted of Conduit, the winner of the St Leger Stakes and Breeders' Cup Turf in 2008, Tartan Bearer (runner-up in the 2008 Epsom Derby) and the Coronation Cup winner Ask. Conduit and Tartan Bearer were both owned and bred by the Irish Ballymacoll Stud and had shared a paddock as foals before Conduit was removed for his own safety after being "bullied" by his companion. The O'Brien contenders were the Irish Derby winner Frozen Fire, the Chester Vase winner Golden Sword and Rockhampton who was running as a pacemaker. The other runners were the 2008 Epsom Oaks winner Look Here, the John Gosden-trained Awaary and the 66/1 outsider Scintillo. There were no challengers from continental Europe. Conduit was made the 13/8 favourite ahead of Tartan Bearer (7/2) and Golden Sword (9/2).

== The race ==
Rockhampton set the pace as expected from Frozen Fire and Golden Sword, with Conduit towards the rear of the field in the early stages. Golden Sword took the lead on the turn into the straight but the three Stoute runners immediately moved up to challenge. Tartan Bearer gained a slight advantage a furlong from the finish but was quickly overtaken by, Conduit racing on the outside. In the closing stages Conduit drifted to the right, hampering Tartan Bearer before winning by one and three-quarter lengths. Tartan Bearer beat Ask by a head for second place to complete a 1–2–3 for the Stoute stable. The racecourse stewards conducted an inquiry into the interference caused by the winner to the runner-up, but allowed the result to stand.

== Race details ==
- Sponsor: Betfair
- Purse: £984,700; First prize: £567,700
- Surface: Turf
- Going: Good
- Distance: 12 furlongs
- Number of runners: 9
- Winner's time: 2:28.73

== Full result ==
| Pos. | Marg. | Horse (bred) | Age | Jockey | Trainer (Country) | Odds |
|---|---|---|---|---|---|---|
| 1 | | Conduit (IRE) | 4 | Ryan Moore | Michael Stoute (GB) | 13/8 fav |
| 2 | 1¾ | Tartan Bearer (IRE) | 4 | Mick Kinane | Michael Stoute (GB) | 7/2 |
| 3 | hd | Ask (GB) | 6 | Olivier Peslier | Michael Stoute (GB) | 9/1 |
| 4 | 2¼ | Alwaary (USA) | 3 | Richard Hills | John Gosden (GB) | 12/1 |
| 5 | 4 | Golden Sword (GB) | 3 | Johnny Murtagh | Aidan O'Brien (IRE) | 9/2 |
| 6 | 2½ | Look Here (GB) | 4 | Seb Sanders | Ralph Beckett (GB) | 7/1 |
| 7 | 2 | Frozen Fire (GER) | 4 | Seamie Heffernan | Aidan O'Brien (IRE) | 20/1 |
| 8 | 8 | Rockhampton (IRE) | 3 | Colm O'Donoghue | Aidan O'Brien (IRE) | 125/1 |
| 9 | 87 | Scintillo (GB) | 4 | Richard Hughes | Richard Hannon, Sr. (GB) | 66/1 |

- Abbreviations: nse = nose; nk = neck; shd = head; hd = head

== Winner's details ==
Further details of the winner, Conduit

- Sex: Colt
- Foaled: 23 March 2005
- Country: Ireland
- Sire: Dalakhani; Dam: Well Head (Sadler's Wells)
- Owner: Ballymacoll Stud
- Breeder: Ballymacoll Stud
