= 2008 World Thoroughbred Rankings =

The 2008 World Thoroughbred Rankings was the 2008 edition of the World Thoroughbred Rankings. It was an assessment of Thoroughbred racehorses issued by the International Federation of Horseracing Authorities (IFHA) in January 2009. It included horses aged three or older which competed in flat races anywhere in the world during 2008. It was the first edition to be open to all horses irrespective of where they raced or were trained. In previous years the IFHA had published two separate listings – a "Northern Hemisphere" edition in January, and a "Southern Hemisphere" version in August.

This year's joint-highest ratings were awarded to Curlin for his performances in both the Dubai World Cup and the Stephen Foster Handicap, and to New Approach for his win in the Champion Stakes. Each was given a rating of 130. A total of 288 horses were included in the list.

== Full rankings for 2008 ==
- For a detailed guide to this table, see below.

| Rank | Rating | Horse | Age | Sex | Trained | Pos. | Race | Surface | Dist. | Cat. |
|---|---|---|---|---|---|---|---|---|---|---|
| 1 | 130 | Curlin (USA) | 4 | C | USA | 1st 1st | Dubai World Cup; Stephen Foster Handicap | Dirt; Dirt | 2,000; 1,811 | I M |
| 1 | 130 | New Approach (IRE) | 3 | C | IRE | 1st | Champion Stakes | Turf | 2,012 | I |
| 3 | 129 | Raven's Pass (USA) | 3 | C | GB | 1st | Breeders' Cup Classic | Artificial | 2,012 | I |
| 4 | 128 | Zarkava (IRE) | 3 | F | FR | 1st | Prix de l'Arc de Triomphe | Turf | 2,400 | L |
| 5 | 127 | Duke of Marmalade (IRE) | 4 | C | IRE | 1st | Prince of Wales's Stakes | Turf | 2,012 | I |
| | 127 | Raven's Pass (USA) | 3 | C | GB | 1st | Queen Elizabeth II Stakes | Turf | 1,609 | M |
| | 126 | Duke of Marmalade (IRE) | 4 | C | IRE | 1st | King George VI and Queen Elizabeth S. | Turf | 2,414 | L |
| 6 | 125 | Big Brown (USA) | 3 | C | USA | 1st 1st | Kentucky Derby; Preakness Stakes | Dirt; Dirt | 2,012; 1,911 | I I |
| 6 | 125 | Conduit (IRE) | 3 | C | GB | 1st | Breeders' Cup Turf | Turf | 2,414 | L |
| 6 | 125 | Goldikova (IRE) | 3 | F | FR | 1st | Breeders' Cup Mile | Turf | 1,609 | M |
| 6 | 125 | Henrythenavigator (USA) | 3 | C | IRE | 2nd 2nd | Queen Elizabeth II Stakes; Breeders' Cup Classic | Turf; Artificial | 1,609; 2,012 | M I |
| 6 | 125 | Montmartre (FR) | 3 | C | FR | 1st | Grand Prix de Paris | Turf | 2,400 | L |
| 6 | 125 | Youmzain (IRE) | 5 | H | GB | 2nd | Prix de l'Arc de Triomphe | Turf | 2,400 | L |
| | 125 | Zarkava (IRE) | 3 | F | FR | 1st | Prix de Diane | Turf | 2,100 | I |
| 6 | 125 | Zenyatta (USA) | 4 | F | USA | 1st | Breeders' Cup Ladies' Classic | Artificial | 1,811 | M |
| 13 | 124 | Good Ba Ba (USA) | 6 | G | HK | 1st | Hong Kong Mile | Turf | 1,600 | M |
| 13 | 124 | It's Gino (GER) | 5 | H | GER | 3rd= | Prix de l'Arc de Triomphe | Turf | 2,400 | L |
| 13 | 124 | Paco Boy (IRE) | 3 | C | GB | 1st | Prix de la Forêt | Turf | 1,400 | M |
| 13 | 124 | Papal Bull (GB) | 5 | H | GB | 2nd | King George VI and Queen Elizabeth S. | Turf | 2,414 | L |
| 13 | 124 | Soldier of Fortune (IRE) | 4 | C | IRE | 3rd= | Prix de l'Arc de Triomphe | Turf | 2,400 | L |
| 13 | 124 | Tamayuz (GB) | 3 | C | FR | 1st | Prix Jacques Le Marois | Turf | 1,600 | M |
| 19 | 123 | Midnight Lute (USA) | 5 | H | USA | 1st | Breeders' Cup Sprint | Artificial | 1,207 | S |
| 19 | 123 | Phoenix Tower (USA) | 4 | C | GB | 2nd | International Stakes | Turf | 2,012 | I |
| 19 | 123 | Sacred Kingdom (AUS) | 4 | G | HK | 1st | Chairman's Sprint Prize | Turf | 1,200 | S |
| 19 | 123 | Tiago (USA) | 4 | C | USA | 3rd | Breeders' Cup Classic | Artificial | 2,012 | I |
| | 122 | Big Brown (USA) | 3 | C | USA | 1st | Florida Derby | Dirt | 1,811 | M |
| 23 | 122 | Commentator (USA) | 7 | G | USA | 1st 1st | Whitney Handicap; Massachusetts Handicap | Dirt; Dirt | 1,811; 1,811 | M M |
| | 122 | Conduit (IRE) | 3 | C | GB | 1st | St. Leger Stakes | Turf | 2,937 | E |
| 23 | 122 | Eagle Mountain (GB) | 4 | C | UAE | 2nd 1st | Breeders' Cup Turf; Hong Kong Cup | Turf; Turf | 2,414; 2,000 | L I |
| 23 | 122 | Kip Deville (USA) | 5 | H | USA | 1st 2nd | Poker Handicap; Breeders' Cup Mile | Turf; Turf | 1,609; 1,609 | M M |
| 23 | 122 | Screen Hero (JPN) | 4 | C | JPN | 1st | Japan Cup | Turf | 2,400 | L |
| 23 | 122 | Septimus (IRE) | 5 | H | IRE | 1st | Irish St. Leger | Turf | 2,816 | E |
| 23 | 122 | Tartan Bearer (IRE) | 3 | C | GB | 2nd | Epsom Derby | Turf | 2,423 | L |
| 23 | 122 | Vision d'Etat (FR) | 3 | C | FR | 5th | Prix de l'Arc de Triomphe | Turf | 2,400 | L |
| 23 | 122 | Viva Pataca (GB) | 6 | G | HK | 1st 1st | Hong Kong Gold Cup; Sha Tin Trophy | Turf; Turf | 2,000; 1,600 | I M |
| 23 | 122 | Weekend Hussler (AUS) | 3; 3; 4 | G | AUS | 1st 1st 1st | Newmarket Handicap; George Ryder Stakes; Underwood Stakes | Turf; Turf; Turf | 1,200; 1,500; 1,800 | S M M |
| 23 | 122 | Yeats (IRE) | 7 | H | IRE | 1st 1st | Ascot Gold Cup; Goodwood Cup | Turf; Turf | 4,023; 3,219 | E E |
| 33 | 121 | Adlerflug (GER) | 4 | C | GER | 1st | Deutschland-Preis | Turf | 2,400 | L |
| 33 | 121 | Apache Cat (AUS) | 5 | G | AUS | 1st 1st | T. J. Smith Stakes; Doomben 10,000 | Turf; Turf | 1,200; 1,350 | S M |
| 33 | 121 | Deep Sky (JPN) | 3 | C | JPN | 2nd | Japan Cup | Turf | 2,400 | L |
| 33 | 121 | Getaway (GER) | 5 | H | FR | 1st | Jockey Club Stakes | Turf | 2,414 | L |
| 33 | 121 | Kamsin (GER) | 3 | C | GER | 1st | Grosser Preis von Baden | Turf | 2,400 | L |
| 33 | 121 | Marchand d'Or (FR) | 5 | G | FR | 1st 1st | Prix du Gros Chêne; Prix Maurice de Gheest | Turf; Turf | 1,000; 1,300 | S S |
| 33 | 121 | Matsurida Gogh (JPN) | 5 | H | JPN | 1st | Nikkei Sho | Turf | 2,500 | L |
| 33 | 121 | Pocket Power (SAF) | 5 | G | SAF | 1st= | Durban July Handicap | Turf | 2,200 | L |
| 41 | 120 | Archipenko (USA) | 4 | C | UAE | 1st | QE II Cup | Turf | 2,000 | I |
| 41 | 120 | Famous Name (GB) | 3 | C | IRE | 2nd | Prix du Jockey Club | Turf | 2,100 | I |
| 41 | 120 | Go Between (USA) | 5 | H | USA | 1st 5th | Pacific Classic Stakes; Breeders' Cup Classic | Artificial; Artificial | 2,012; 2,012 | I I |
| 41 | 120 | Haradasun (AUS) | 4 | C | IRE | 1st | Queen Anne Stakes | Turf | 1,609 | M |
| 41 | 120 | Heatseeker (IRE) | 5 | H | USA | 1st 1st | Santa Anita Handicap; Californian Stakes | Artificial; Artificial | 2,012; 1,811 | I M |
| 41 | 120 | Honour Devil (ARG) | 3 | C | UAE | 1st | UAE Derby | Dirt | 1,800 | M |
| 41 | 120 | J J the Jet Plane (SAF) | 3 | G | SAF | 1st 1st | Golden Horse Casino Sprint; Mercury Sprint | Turf; Turf | 1,200; 1,200 | S S |
| 41 | 120 | Jay Peg (SAF) | 4 | C | UAE | 1st | Dubai Duty Free | Turf | 1,777 | M |
| 41 | 120 | Overdose (GB) | 3 | C | HUN | 1st | Premio Carlo e Francesco Aloisi | Turf | 1,200 | S |
| 41 | 120 | Sun Classique (AUS) | 4 | F | UAE | 1st | Dubai Sheema Classic | Turf | 2,400 | L |
| 41 | 120 | Vodka (JPN) | 4 | F | JPN | 1st | Yasuda Kinen | Turf | 1,600 | M |
| 52 | 119 | Ask (GB) | 5 | H | GB | 6th | Prix de l'Arc de Triomphe | Turf | 2,400 | L |
| 52 | 119 | Benny the Bull (USA) | 5 | H | USA | 1st 1st | Dubai Golden Shaheen; Smile Sprint Handicap | Dirt; Dirt | 1,200; 1,207 | S S |
| 52 | 119 | Cocoa Beach (CHI) | 4 | F | USA | 2nd | Breeders' Cup Ladies' Classic | Artificial | 1,811 | M |
| 52 | 119 | Colonel John (USA) | 3 | C | USA | 1st | Travers Stakes | Dirt | 2,012 | I |
| 52 | 119 | Company (JPN) | 7 | H | JPN | 4th | Tenno Sho (Autumn) | Turf | 2,000 | I |
| 52 | 119 | Daiwa Scarlet (JPN) | 4 | F | JPN | 1st | Arima Kinen | Turf | 2,500 | L |
| 52 | 119 | Darjina (FR) | 4 | F | FR | 2nd | Prix du Moulin de Longchamp | Turf | 1,600 | M |
| 52 | 119 | Doctor Dino (FR) | 6 | H | FR | 3rd 1st 3rd | Dubai Sheema Classic; Grand Prix de Chantilly; Grand Prix de Saint-Cloud | Turf; Turf; Turf | 2,400; 2,400; 2,400 | L L L |
| 52 | 119 | Eishin Deputy (JPN) | 6 | H | JPN | 1st | Takarazuka Kinen | Turf | 2,200 | L |
| 52 | 119 | Fatal Bullet (USA) | 3 | C | USA | 2nd | Breeders' Cup Sprint | Artificial | 1,207 | S |
| 52 | 119 | Frozen Fire (GER) | 3 | C | IRE | 1st | Irish Derby | Turf | 2,414 | L |
| 52 | 119 | Kane Hekili (JPN) | 6 | H | JPN | 1st | Tokyo Daishoten | Dirt | 2,000 | I |
| 52 | 119 | Lady Marian (GER) | 3 | F | GER | 1st | Prix de l'Opéra | Turf | 2,000 | I |
| 52 | 119 | Linngari (IRE) | 6 | H | GB | 1st | Bayerisches Zuchtrennen | Turf | 2,000 | I |
| 52 | 119 | Look Here (GB) | 3 | F | GB | 1st | Epsom Oaks | Turf | 2,423 | L |
| 52 | 119 | Lush Lashes (GB) | 3 | F | IRE | 1st | Coronation Stakes | Turf | 1,609 | M |
| 52 | 119 | Macarthur (GB) | 4 | C | IRE | 3rd 1st | Coronation Cup; Hardwicke Stakes | Turf; Turf | 2,423; 2,414 | L L |
| 52 | 119 | Mount Nelson (GB) | 4 | C | IRE | 1st | Eclipse Stakes | Turf | 2,018 | I |
| 52 | 119 | Oken Bruce Lee (JPN) | 3 | C | JPN | 5th | Japan Cup | Turf | 2,400 | L |
| 52 | 119 | Pompeii Ruler (AUS) | 6 | G | AUS | 2nd | Underwood Stakes | Turf | 1,800 | M |
| 52 | 119 | Quijano (GER) | 6 | G | GER | 4th | Dubai Sheema Classic | Turf | 2,400 | L |
| 52 | 119 | Racing to Win (AUS) | 5 | G | AUS | 2nd | George Ryder Stakes | Turf | 1,500 | M |
| 52 | 119 | Saddex (GB) | 5 | H | GER | 2nd | Prix Ganay | Turf | 2,100 | I |
| 52 | 119 | Sageburg (IRE) | 4 | C | FR | 1st 3rd↑ 2nd | Prix d'Ispahan; Prix du Moulin de Longchamp; Prix Daniel Wildenstein | Turf; Turf; Turf | 1,850; 1,600; 1,600 | M M M |
| 52 | 119 | Sirmione (AUS) | 4 | G | AUS | 1st | Australian Cup | Turf | 2,000 | I |
| 52 | 119 | Spirit One (FR) | 4 | C | FR | 1st | Arlington Million | Turf | 2,012 | I |
| 52 | 119 | Twice Over (GB) | 3 | C | GB | 2nd | Champion Stakes | Turf | 2,012 | I |
| 52 | 119 | Well Armed (USA) | 5 | G | USA | 2nd 1st | Pacific Classic Stakes; Goodwood Stakes (USA) | Artificial; Artificial | 2,012; 1,811 | I M |
| 80 | 118 | Able One (NZ) | 6 | G | HK | 2nd | Hong Kong Mile | Turf | 1,600 | M |
| 80 | 118 | Admire Jupiter (JPN) | 5 | H | JPN | 1st | Tenno Sho (Spring) | Turf | 3,200 | E |
| 80 | 118 | Admire Monarch (JPN) | 7 | H | JPN | 2nd | Arima Kinen | Turf | 2,500 | L |
| 80 | 118 | Air Shady (JPN) | 7 | H | JPN | 5th | Tenno Sho (Autumn) | Turf | 2,000 | I |
| 80 | 118 | Armada (NZ) | 6 | G | HK | 2nd | Champions Mile | Turf | 1,600 | M |
| 80 | 118 | Balius (IRE) | 5 | H | FR | 2nd | Hong Kong Cup | Turf | 2,000 | I |
| 80 | 118 | Bob Black Jack (USA) | 3 | C | USA | 1st | Malibu Stakes | Artificial | 1,408 | S |
| 80 | 118 | Cesare (GB) | 7 | G | GB | 4th | Queen Anne Stakes | Turf | 1,609 | M |
| 80 | 118 | Cost of Freedom (USA) | 5 | G | USA | 1st | Ancient Title Stakes | Artificial | 1,207 | S |
| 80 | 118 | Creachadoir (IRE) | 4 | C | GB | 1st | Lockinge Stakes | Turf | 1,609 | M |
| 80 | 118 | Da' Tara (USA) | 3 | C | USA | 1st | Belmont Stakes | Dirt | 2,414 | L |
| 80 | 118 | Dancing Forever (USA) | 5 | H | USA | 3rd | Breeders' Cup Turf | Turf | 2,414 | L |
| 80 | 118 | Divine Park (USA) | 4 | C | USA | 1st 1st | Westchester Handicap; Metropolitan Handicap | Dirt; Dirt | 1,609; 1,609 | M M |
| 80 | 118 | Einstein (BRZ) | 5 | H | USA | 1st 1st | Gulfstream Park Turf Stakes; Turf Classic Stakes | Turf; Turf | 2,213; 1,811 | L M |
| 80 | 118 | Falco (USA) | 3 | C | FR | 1st | Poule d'Essai des Poulains | Turf | 1,600 | M |
| 80 | 118 | Forever Together (USA) | 4 | F | USA | 1st | Breeders' Cup Filly & Mare Turf | Turf | 2,012 | I |
| 80 | 118 | Ginger Punch (USA) | 5 | M | USA | 1st 1st | Ogden Phipps Handicap; Personal Ensign Stakes | Dirt; Dirt | 1,710; 2,012 | M I |
| 80 | 118 | Grand Couturier (GB) | 5 | H | USA | 1st | Joe Hirsch Turf Classic Invitational | Turf | 2,414 | L |
| 80 | 118 | Greg's Gold (USA) | 7 | G | USA | 1st | Potrero Grande Handicap | Artificial | 1,308 | S |
| 80 | 118 | Halfway to Heaven (IRE) | 3 | F | IRE | 1st | Sun Chariot Stakes | Turf | 1,609 | M |
| 80 | 118 | Hystericalady (USA) | 5 | M | USA | 1st 1st | Delaware Handicap; Molly Pitcher Stakes | Dirt; Dirt | 2,012; 1,710 | I M |
| 80 | 118 | Kingsgate Native (IRE) | 3 | C | GB | 1st | Golden Jubilee Stakes | Turf | 1,207 | S |
| 80 | 118 | Maldivian (NZ) | 6 | G | AUS | 2nd 1st | Memsie Stakes; W. S. Cox Plate | Turf; Turf | 1,400; 2,040 | M I |
| 80 | 118 | Mambo in Seattle (USA) | 3 | C | USA | 2nd | Travers Stakes | Dirt | 2,012 | I |
| 80 | 118 | Meisho Samson (JPN) | 5 | H | JPN | 2nd | Takarazuka Kinen | Turf | 2,200 | L |
| 80 | 118 | Monterey Jazz (USA) | 4 | C | USA | 1st 1st | Strub Stakes; Texas Mile Stakes | Artificial; Dirt | 1,811; 1,609 | M M |
| 80 | 118 | Multidimensional (IRE) | 5 | H | GB | 2nd | Hardwicke Stakes | Turf | 2,414 | L |
| 80 | 118 | Music Note (USA) | 3 | F | USA | 1st 2nd 1st | Coaching Club American Oaks; Alabama Stakes; Gazelle Stakes | Dirt; Dirt; Dirt | 2,012; 2,012; 1,811 | I I M |
| 80 | 118 | Oracle West (SAF) | 6 | G | UAE | 1st | Meydan Racecourse Handicap | Turf | 1,777 | M |
| 80 | 118 | Pipedreamer (GB) | 4 | C | GB | 3rd 4th | Prince of Wales's Stakes; International Stakes | Turf; Turf | 2,012; 2,012 | I I |
| 80 | 118 | Proud Spell (USA) | 3 | F | USA | 1st 1st | Kentucky Oaks; Alabama Stakes | Dirt; Dirt | 1,811; 2,012 | M I |
| 80 | 118 | Stimulation (IRE) | 3 | C | GB | 1st | Challenge Stakes | Turf | 1,408 | M |
| 80 | 118 | Street Boss (USA) | 4 | C | USA | 1st | Bing Crosby Handicap | Artificial | 1,207 | S |
| 80 | 118 | Super Hornet (JPN) | 5 | H | JPN | 1st 1st 2nd | Keio Hai Spring Cup; Mainichi Okan; Mile Championship | Turf; Turf; Turf | 1,400; 1,800; 1,600 | M M M |
| 80 | 118 | Sushisan (AUS) | 5 | G | UAE | 6th | Dubai Sheema Classic | Turf | 2,400 | L |
| 80 | 118 | Traffic Guard (USA) | 4 | C | GB | 2nd | Irish Champion Stakes | Turf | 2,012 | I |
| 80 | 118 | Ventura (USA) | 4 | F | USA | 1st | Breeders' Cup Filly & Mare Sprint | Artificial | 1,408 | S |
| 80 | 118 | Vermilion (JPN) | 6 | H | JPN | 1st 2nd | February Stakes; Tokyo Daishoten | Dirt; Dirt | 1,600; 2,000 | M I |
| 80 | 118 | Winchester (USA) | 3 | C | IRE | 1st | Secretariat Stakes | Turf | 2,012 | I |
| 80 | 118 | Zambezi Sun (GB) | 4 | C | FR | 2nd | Grand Prix de Chantilly | Turf | 2,400 | L |
| 120 | 117 | Absolute Champion (AUS) | 6 | G | HK | 1st | Centenary Sprint Cup | Turf | 1,000 | S |
| 120 | 117 | All Silent (AUS) | 5 | G | AUS | 1st | Emirates Stakes | Turf | 1,600 | M |
| 120 | 117 | Asiatic Boy (ARG) | 4 | C | UAE | 1st 2nd | Al Shindagha Sprint; Dubai World Cup | Dirt; Dirt | 1,200; 2,000 | S I |
| 120 | 117 | Better Talk Now (USA) | 9 | G | USA | 3rd | Man o' War Stakes | Turf | 2,213 | L |
| 120 | 117 | Casual Conquest (IRE) | 3 | C | IRE | 1st | Derrinstown Stud Derby Trial | Turf | 2,012 | I |
| 120 | 117 | C'est la Guerre (NZ) | 4 | G | AUS | 3rd | Melbourne Cup | Turf | 3,200 | E |
| 120 | 117 | Daytona (IRE) | 4 | G | USA | 1st | Shoemaker Mile Stakes | Turf | 1,609 | M |
| 120 | 117 | Diabolical (USA) | 5 | H | UAE | 1st | Mahab Al Shimaal | Dirt | 1,200 | S |
| 120 | 117 | Douro Valley (AUS) | 7 | G | AUS | 1st | Yalumba Stakes | Turf | 2,000 | I |
| 120 | 117 | Dream Journey (JPN) | 4 | C | JPN | 4th | Arima Kinen | Turf | 2,500 | L |
| 120 | 117 | Finsceal Beo (IRE) | 4 | F | IRE | 2nd | Tattersalls Gold Cup | Turf | 2,112 | I |
| 120 | 117 | Geordieland (FR) | 7 | H | GB | 1st | Yorkshire Cup | Turf | 2,816 | E |
| 120 | 117 | Georgie Boy (USA) | 3 | C | USA | 1st 1st | San Vicente Stakes; San Felipe Stakes | Artificial; Artificial | 1,408; 1,710 | S M |
| 120 | 117 | Hyperbaric (USA) | 5 | G | USA | 1st | Citation Handicap | Turf | 1,710 | M |
| 120 | 117 | Indian Blessing (USA) | 3 | F | USA | 1st | Test Stakes | Dirt | 1,408 | S |
| 120 | 117 | Inspiration (AUS) | 5 | G | HK | 1st | Hong Kong Sprint | Turf | 1,200 | S |
| 120 | 117 | Intangaroo (USA) | 4 | F | USA | 1st 1st | Humana Distaff Stakes; Ballerina Stakes | Dirt; Dirt | 1,408; 1,408 | S S |
| 120 | 117 | Inti Raimi (JPN) | 6 | H | JPN | 3rd | Takarazuka Kinen | Turf | 2,200 | L |
| 120 | 117 | Lava Man (USA) | 7 | G | USA | 3rd | Charles Whittingham Memorial H. | Turf | 2,012 | I |
| 120 | 117 | Light Fantastic (AUS) | 4 | G | AUS | 1st | J. J. Liston Stakes | Turf | 1,400 | M |
| 120 | 117 | Loup Breton (IRE) | 4 | C | FR | 2nd | Prix Dollar | Turf | 1,950 | I |
| 120 | 117 | Marasco (AUS) | 5 | G | AUS | 1st 1st | H. G. Bolton Sprint; Belmont Sprint | Turf; Turf | 1,200; 1,400 | S M |
| 120 | 117 | Marsh Side (USA) | 5 | H | USA | 1st | Canadian International | Turf | 2,414 | L |
| 120 | 117 | Mast Track (USA) | 4 | C | USA | 1st | Hollywood Gold Cup | Artificial | 2,012 | I |
| 120 | 117 | Nashoba's Key (USA) | 5 | M | USA | 1st | Santa Margarita Invitational Handicap | Artificial | 1,811 | M |
| 120 | 117 | Precious Kitten (USA) | 5 | M | USA | 1st | Gamely Stakes | Turf | 1,811 | M |
| 120 | 117 | Pressing (IRE) | 5 | H | GB | 2nd 1st | Premio Presidente della Repubblica; Topkapi Trophy | Turf; Turf | 2,000; 1,600 | I M |
| 120 | 117 | Promising Lead (GB) | 4 | F | GB | 1st | Pretty Polly Stakes | Turf | 2,012 | I |
| 120 | 117 | Red Giant (USA) | 4 | C | USA | 1st | Clement L. Hirsch Turf Championship | Turf | 2,012 | I |
| 120 | 117 | Red Rocks (IRE) | 5 | H | GB | 1st | Man o' War Stakes | Turf | 2,213 | L |
| 120 | 117 | Russian Cross (IRE) | 3 | C | FR | 1st 2nd | Prix Guillaume d'Ornano; Prix du Prince d'Orange | Turf; Turf | 2,000; 2,000 | I I |
| 120 | 117 | Schiaparelli (GER) | 5 | H | GB | 2nd | Prix Foy | Turf | 2,400 | L |
| 120 | 117 | Spirito del Vento (FR) | 5 | G | FR | 1st | Prix Daniel Wildenstein | Turf | 1,600 | M |
| 120 | 117 | Takeover Target (AUS) | 8; 9 | G | AUS | 1st 1st | KrisFlyer International Sprint; Winterbottom Stakes | Turf; Turf | 1,200; 1,200 | S S |
| 120 | 117 | Whobegotyou (AUS) | 3 | G | AUS | 1st | Caulfield Guineas | Turf | 1,600 | M |
| 155 | 116 | Blumenblatt (JPN) | 5 | M | JPN | 1st | Mile Championship | Turf | 1,600 | M |
| 155 | 116 | Borderlescott (GB) | 6 | G | GB | 1st | Nunthorpe Stakes | Turf | 1,006 | S |
| 155 | 116 | Buy and Sell (SAF) | 4 | G | SAF | 4th | J&B Met | Turf | 2,000 | I |
| 155 | 116 | Campanologist (USA) | 3 | C | GB | 4th | Eclipse Stakes | Turf | 2,018 | I |
| 155 | 116 | Cima de Triomphe (IRE) | 3 | C | ITY | 9th | Prix de l'Arc de Triomphe | Turf | 2,400 | L |
| 155 | 116 | Court Vision (USA) | 3 | C | USA | 1st | Hollywood Derby | Turf | 2,012 | I |
| 155 | 116 | Crossharbour (GB) | 4 | C | FR | 1st | Prix du Conseil de Paris | Turf | 2,400 | L |
| 155 | 116 | Egyptian Ra (NZ) | 7 | G | HK | 1st 3rd | International Mile Trial; Hong Kong Mile | Turf; Turf | 1,600; 1,600 | M M |
| 155 | 116 | Equiano (FR) | 3 | C | SPA | 1st | King's Stand Stakes | Turf | 1,006 | S |
| 155 | 116 | Fine Grain (JPN) | 5 | H | JPN | 3rd | Mile Championship | Turf | 1,600 | M |
| 155 | 116 | Green Birdie (NZ) | 5 | G | HK | 2nd | Hong Kong Sprint | Turf | 1,200 | S |
| 155 | 116 | Guillotine (NZ) | 4 | C | AUS | 1st 3rd | Dato Tan Chin Nam Stakes; Yalumba Stakes | Turf; Turf | 1,600; 2,000 | M I |
| 155 | 116 | Harlem Rocker (CAN) | 3 | C | USA | 2nd↓ | Cigar Mile Handicap | Dirt | 1,609 | M |
| 155 | 116 | Honolulu (IRE) | 4 | C | IRE | 1st | Doncaster Cup | Turf | 3,621 | E |
| 155 | 116 | Hunting Tower (SAF) | 5 | G | SAF | 3rd | J&B Met | Turf | 2,000 | I |
| 155 | 116 | Ideal World (USA) | 3 | C | FR | 2nd | Prix Niel | Turf | 2,400 | L |
| 155 | 116 | In Summation (USA) | 5 | H | USA | 1st 2nd | Palos Verdes Handicap; Bing Crosby Handicap | Artificial; Artificial | 1,207; 1,207 | S S |
| 155 | 116 | Jaguar Mail (JPN) | 4 | C | JPN | 3rd | Hong Kong Vase | Turf | 2,400 | L |
| 155 | 116 | Lewis Michael (USA) | 5 | H | USA | 1st | Pat O'Brien Handicap | Artificial | 1,408 | S |
| 155 | 116 | Liang Kay (GER) | 3 | C | GER | 1st | Fürstenberg-Rennen | Turf | 2,000 | I |
| 155 | 116 | Meisho Tokon (JPN) | 6 | H | JPN | 2nd | Japan Cup Dirt | Dirt | 1,800 | M |
| 155 | 116 | Mentality (AUS) | 4; 5 | G | AUS | 1st 1st | Canterbury Stakes; George Main Stakes | Turf; Turf | 1,550; 1,600 | M M |
| 155 | 116 | Mores Wells (GB) | 4 | C | IRE | 1st 3rd | Ballyroan Stakes; Irish Champion Stakes | Turf; Turf | 2,414; 2,012 | L I |
| 155 | 116 | Natagora (FR) | 3 | F | FR | 2nd | Prix Jacques Le Marois | Turf | 1,600 | M |
| 155 | 116 | Niconero (AUS) | 6 | G | AUS | 1st | Futurity Stakes | Turf | 1,600 | M |
| 155 | 116 | Oriental Tiger (GER) | 5 | H | GER | 1st | Gerling-Preis | Turf | 2,400 | L |
| 155 | 116 | Out of Control (BRZ) | 4; 5 | C H | USA | 2nd 2nd | Manhattan Handicap; Clement L. Hirsch Turf Championship | Turf; Turf | 2,012; 2,012 | I I |
| 155 | 116 | Packing Winner (NZ) | 5 | G | HK | 1st | Champions & Chater Cup | Turf | 2,400 | L |
| 155 | 116 | Precious Boy (GER) | 3 | C | GER | 1st | Grosse Europa-Meile | Turf | 1,600 | M |
| 155 | 116 | Purple Moon (IRE) | 5 | G | GB | 2nd | Hong Kong Vase | Turf | 2,400 | L |
| 155 | 116 | Rahy's Attorney (CAN) | 4 | G | CAN | 1st | Woodbine Mile | Turf | 1,609 | M |
| 155 | 116 | Rebel Raider (AUS) | 3 | C | AUS | 1st | Victoria Derby | Turf | 2,500 | L |
| 155 | 116 | Rio de la Plata (USA) | 3 | C | GB | 3rd | Prix Jean Prat | Turf | 1,600 | M |
| 155 | 116 | Royal and Regal (IRE) | 4 | G | GB | 1st 2nd | John Porter Stakes; Yorkshire Cup | Turf; Turf | 2,419; 2,816 | L E |
| 155 | 116 | Sakura Mega Wonder (JPN) | 5 | H | JPN | 6th | Tenno Sho (Autumn) | Turf | 2,000 | I |
| 155 | 116 | Sarrera (AUS) | 7 | G | AUS | 1st 1st | Queen Elizabeth Stakes; Doomben Cup | Turf; Turf | 2,000; 2,020 | I I |
| 155 | 116 | Sealy Hill (CAN) | 4 | F | CAN | 2nd | Breeders' Cup Filly & Mare Turf | Turf | 2,012 | I |
| 155 | 116 | Spring at Last (USA) | 5 | H | USA | 1st | Donn Handicap | Dirt | 1,811 | M |
| 155 | 116 | Surf Cat (USA) | 6 | H | USA | 1st 2nd | San Carlos Handicap; San Diego Handicap | Artificial; Artificial | 1,408; 1,710 | S M |
| 155 | 116 | Tale of Ekati (USA) | 3 | C | USA | 1st↑ | Cigar Mile Handicap | Dirt | 1,609 | M |
| 155 | 116 | Tough Tiz's Sis (USA) | 4 | F | USA | 1st | Ruffian Handicap | Dirt | 1,710 | M |
| 155 | 116 | US Ranger (USA) | 4 | C | IRE | 2nd | July Cup | Turf | 1,207 | S |
| 155 | 116 | Wait a While (USA) | 5 | M | USA | 1st 3rd | Yellow Ribbon Stakes; Breeders' Cup Filly & Mare Turf | Turf; Turf | 2,012; 2,012 | I I |
| 155 | 116 | Watar (IRE) | 3 | C | FR | 1st 5th | Prix Chaudenay; Prix Royal-Oak | Turf; Turf | 3,000; 3,100 | E E |
| 155 | 116 | Whatsthescript (IRE) | 4 | C | USA | 3rd | Breeders' Cup Mile | Turf | 1,609 | M |
| 155 | 116 | Zaftig (USA) | 3 | F | USA | 1st | Acorn Stakes | Dirt | 1,609 | M |
| 155 | 116 | Zipping (AUS) | 7 | G | AUS | 3rd 2nd | Turnbull Stakes; W. S. Cox Plate | Turf; Turf | 2,000; 2,040 | I I |
| 202 | 115 | A P Arrow (USA) | 6 | H | USA | 2nd 4th | Donn Handicap; Dubai World Cup | Dirt; Dirt | 1,811; 2,000 | M I |
| 202 | 115 | Admire Aura (JPN) | 4 | C | JPN | 1st | Kyoto Kinen | Turf | 2,200 | L |
| 202 | 115 | African Rose (GB) | 3 | F | FR | 2nd | Prix Maurice de Gheest | Turf | 1,300 | S |
| 202 | 115 | Alamosa (NZ) | 4 | C | AUS | 1st | Toorak Handicap | Turf | 1,600 | M |
| 202 | 115 | Albertus Maximus (USA) | 4 | C | USA | 3rd 1st | Goodwood Stakes (USA); Breeders' Cup Dirt Mile | Artificial; Artificial | 1,811; 1,609 | M M |
| 202 | 115 | Alessandro Volta (GB) | 3 | C | IRE | 4th↓ | Irish Derby | Turf | 2,414 | L |
| 202 | 115 | Arson Squad (USA) | 5 | G | USA | 4th | Cigar Mile Handicap | Dirt | 1,609 | M |
| 202 | 115 | Asakusa Kings (JPN) | 4 | C | JPN | 3rd 3rd | Osaka Hai; Tenno Sho (Spring) | Turf; Turf | 2,000; 3,200 | I E |
| 202 | 115 | Asian Winds (JPN) | 4 | F | JPN | 1st | Victoria Mile | Turf | 1,600 | M |
| 202 | 115 | Awesome Gem (USA) | 5 | G | USA | 3rd | San Antonio Handicap | Artificial | 1,811 | M |
| 202 | 115 | Bankable (IRE) | 4 | C | GB | 2nd 2nd | Steventon Stakes; Celebration Mile | Turf; Turf | 2,017; 1,609 | I M |
| 202 | 115 | Bannaby (FR) | 5 | H | SPA | 1st | Prix du Cadran | Turf | 4,000 | E |
| 202 | 115 | Black Seventeen (USA) | 4 | C | USA | 1st | Vosburgh Stakes | Dirt | 1,207 | S |
| 202 | 115 | Blue Monday (GB) | 7 | G | GB | 1st | Arc Trial | Turf | 2,217 | L |
| 202 | 115 | Bullish Luck (USA) | 9 | G | HK | 1st 3rd | Centenary Vase; Hong Kong Gold Cup | Turf; Turf | 1,800; 2,000 | M I |
| 202 | 115 | Carriage Trail (USA) | 5 | M | USA | 1st | Spinster Stakes | Artificial | 1,811 | M |
| 202 | 115 | Casino Prince (AUS) | 4 | C | AUS | 1st 3rd 2nd 3rd | Chipping Norton Stakes; George Ryder Stakes; Doncaster Handicap; All Aged Stakes | Turf; Turf; Turf; Turf | 1,600; 1,500; 1,600; 1,400 | M M M M |
| 202 | 115 | Casual Pass (AUS) | 8 | G | AUS | 2nd | Dato Tan Chin Nam Stakes | Turf | 1,600 | M |
| 202 | 115 | Cat Junior (USA) | 3 | C | GB | 4th 4th 2nd | St. James's Palace Stakes; Prix Jean Prat; Challenge Stakes | Turf; Turf; Turf | 1,609; 1,600; 1,408 | M M M |
| 202 | 115 | Champs Elysees (GB) | 5 | H | USA | 8th 1st | Breeders' Cup Classic; Hollywood Turf Cup | Artificial; Turf | 2,012; 2,414 | I L |
| 202 | 115 | Coastal Path (GB) | 4 | C | FR | 1st | Prix Vicomtesse Vigier | Turf | 3,100 | E |
| 202 | 115 | Dearest Trickski (USA) | 4 | F | USA | 1st | A Gleam Handicap | Artificial | 1,408 | S |
| 202 | 115 | Dynaforce (USA) | 5 | M | USA | 1st | Flower Bowl Invitational Stakes | Turf | 2,012 | I |
| 202 | 115 | Egerton (GER) | 7 | H | GER | 1st | Hansa-Preis | Turf | 2,400 | L |
| 202 | 115 | Eremein (AUS) | 6 | G | AUS | 1st | Festival Stakes (AUS) | Turf | 1,500 | M |
| 202 | 115 | Field Rouge (JPN) | 6 | H | JPN | 1st | Kawasaki Kinen | Dirt | 2,100 | I |
| 202 | 115 | Fleeting Spirit (IRE) | 3 | F | GB | 1st | Temple Stakes | Turf | 1,006 | S |
| 202 | 115 | Floatyourboat (SAF) | 5 | G | SAF | 5th 6th | J&B Met; Astrapak 1900 | Turf; Turf | 2,000; 1,900 | I I |
| 202 | 115 | Floral Pegasus (AUS) | 5 | H | HK | 2nd 2nd 7th | Stewards' Cup; Hong Kong Gold Cup; Dubai Duty Free | Turf; Turf; Turf | 1,600; 2,000; 1,777 | M I M |
| 202 | 115 | Folk Opera (IRE) | 4 | F | GB | 1st 1st | Prix Jean Romanet; E. P. Taylor Stakes | Turf; Turf | 2,000; 2,012 | I I |
| 202 | 115 | Gagnoa (IRE) | 3 | F | FR | 2nd | Prix de Diane | Turf | 2,100 | I |
| 202 | 115 | Gayego (USA) | 3 | C | USA | 1st | Arkansas Derby | Dirt | 1,811 | M |
| 202 | 115 | Gio Ponti (USA) | 3 | C | USA | 1st 2nd | Virginia Derby; Jamaica Handicap | Turf; Turf | 2,012; 1,811 | I M |
| 202 | 115 | Grasshopper (USA) | 4 | C | USA | 2nd | New Orleans Handicap | Dirt | 1,811 | M |
| 202 | 115 | Happy Boy (BRZ) | 4 | C | BRZ | 1st | Al Maktoum Challenge R1 | Dirt | 1,600 | M |
| 202 | 115 | High Rock (IRE) | 3 | C | FR | 1st 4th | Prix La Force; Prix du Jockey Club | Turf; Turf | 2,000; 2,100 | I I |
| 202 | 115 | Idiot Proof (USA) | 4 | C | USA | 2nd | Dubai Golden Shaheen | Dirt | 1,200 | S |
| 202 | 115 | Inspector (TUR) | 4 | C | TUR | 1st | Bosphorus Cup | Turf | 2,400 | L |
| 202 | 115 | Jalil (USA) | 4 | C | UAE | 1st | Al Maktoum Challenge R3 | Dirt | 2,000 | I |
| 202 | 115 | Kings Gambit (SAF) | 3 | G | SAF | 1st | South African Classic | Turf | 1,800 | M |
| 202 | 115 | Littorio (AUS) | 4 | G | AUS | 3rd | Underwood Stakes | Turf | 1,800 | M |
| 202 | 115 | Lucarno (USA) | 4 | C | GB | 1st | Princess of Wales's Stakes | Turf | 2,414 | L |
| 202 | 115 | Lucky Island (ARG) | 4 | C | USA | 1st | Tom Fool Handicap | Dirt | 1,408 | S |
| 202 | 115 | Magnus (AUS) | 5 | H | AUS | 2nd 2nd 4th 2nd | Oakleigh Plate; Newmarket Handicap; The Galaxy; KrisFlyer International Sprint | Turf; Turf; Turf; Turf | 1,100; 1,200; 1,100; 1,200 | S S S S |
| 202 | 115 | Maraahel (IRE) | 7 | H | GB | 2nd | Brigadier Gerard Stakes | Turf | 2,018 | I |
| 202 | 115 | Master O'Reilly (NZ) | 6 | G | AUS | 4th | Melbourne Cup | Turf | 3,200 | E |
| 202 | 115 | Mauralakana (FR) | 5 | M | USA | 1st | Beverly D. Stakes | Turf | 1,911 | I |
| 202 | 115 | Mistical Plan | 4 | F | USA | 1st | Princess Rooney Handicap | Dirt | 1,207 | S |
| 202 | 115 | Muhannak (IRE) | 4 | G | GB | 1st | Breeders' Cup Marathon | Artificial | 2,414 | L |
| 202 | 115 | Murtajill (AUS) | 3 | C | AUS | 2nd | All Aged Stakes | Turf | 1,400 | M |
| 202 | 115 | Nahoodh (IRE) | 3 | F | GB | 1st | Falmouth Stakes | Turf | 1,609 | M |
| 202 | 115 | Never Bouchon (JPN) | 5 | H | JPN | 7th | Japan Cup | Turf | 2,400 | L |
| 202 | 115 | Nom du Jeu (NZ) | 3; 4; 4; 4 | C | NZ | 1st 2nd 3rd 2nd | Australian Derby; Stoney Bridge Stakes; Kelt Capital Stakes; Caulfield Cup | Turf; Turf; Turf; Turf | 2,400; 1,600; 2,040; 2,400 | L M I L |
| 202 | 115 | Orange County (NZ) | 6 | G | AUS | 1st | Sir Rupert Clarke Stakes | Turf | 1,400 | M |
| 202 | 115 | Osumi Grass One (JPN) | 6 | H | JPN | 7th | Tenno Sho (Autumn) | Turf | 2,000 | I |
| 202 | 115 | Paratroopers (AUS) | 5 | G | AUS | 1st | Expressway Stakes | Turf | 1,200 | S |
| 202 | 115 | Past the Point (USA) | 4 | C | USA | 2nd | Woodward Stakes | Dirt | 1,811 | M |
| 202 | 115 | Presious Passion (USA) | 5 | G | USA | 1st | United Nations Stakes | Turf | 2,213 | L |
| 202 | 115 | Prospect Wells (FR) | 3 | C | FR | 2nd | Grand Prix de Paris | Turf | 2,400 | L |
| 202 | 115 | Pyro (USA) | 3 | C | USA | 1st 2nd | Northern Dancer Stakes; Jim Dandy Stakes | Dirt; Dirt | 1,710; 1,811 | M M |
| 202 | 115 | Red Ruler (NZ) | 4 | G | NZ | 2nd | Kelt Capital Stakes | Turf | 2,040 | I |
| 202 | 115 | Rob Roy (USA) | 6 | H | GB | 5th | Eclipse Stakes | Turf | 2,018 | I |
| 202 | 115 | Sanziro (AUS) | 6 | G | HK | 3rd | KrisFlyer International Sprint | Turf | 1,200 | S |
| 202 | 115 | Seachange (NZ) | 5 | M | NZ | 1st | Telegraph Handicap | Turf | 1,200 | S |
| 202 | 115 | Shinzig (AUS) | 6 | H | AUS | 1st | C. F. Orr Stakes | Turf | 1,400 | M |
| 202 | 115 | Sixties Icon (GB) | 5 | H | GB | 1st 1st | Festival Stakes (GB); Geoffrey Freer Stakes | Turf; Turf | 1,986; 2,671 | I L |
| 202 | 115 | Smooth Air (USA) | 3 | C | USA | 7th | Breeders' Cup Classic | Artificial | 2,012 | I |
| 202 | 115 | Soldier's Dancer (USA) | 4 | G | USA | 1st | Miami Mile Handicap | Turf | 1,609 | M |
| 202 | 115 | Spirit of Tara (AUS) | 6 | H | AUS | 4th | The BMW | Turf | 2,400 | L |
| 202 | 115 | Spring House (USA) | 6 | G | USA | 1st | San Luis Obispo Handicap | Turf | 2,414 | L |
| 202 | 115 | Stotsfold (GB) | 5 | G | GB | 1st | Winter Hill Stakes | Turf | 2,018 | I |
| 202 | 115 | Strike a Deal (USA) | 4 | C | USA | 1st | Red Smith Handicap | Turf | 2,213 | L |
| 202 | 115 | Sub Rose (IRE) | 3 | F | FR | 1st | Prix de Royaumont | Turf | 2,400 | L |
| 202 | 115 | Sudan (IRE) | 5 | H | USA | 4th | Man o' War Stakes | Turf | 2,213 | L |
| 202 | 115 | Swick (NZ) | 6; 7 | G | AUS | 2nd 1st | Lightning Stakes; Patinack Farm Classic | Turf; Turf | 1,000; 1,200 | S S |
| 202 | 115 | Tariq (GB) | 4 | C | GB | 3rd | Lockinge Stakes | Turf | 1,609 | M |
| 202 | 115 | Theseo (AUS) | 5 | G | AUS | 2nd 1st 1st | George Main Stakes; Epsom Handicap; Mackinnon Stakes | Turf; Turf; Turf | 1,600; 1,600; 2,000 | M M I |
| 202 | 115 | Thorn Song (USA) | 5 | H | USA | 1st | Shadwell Turf Mile Stakes | Turf | 1,609 | M |
| 202 | 115 | Tuesday Joy (NZ) | 4 | F | AUS | 1st | The BMW | Turf | 2,400 | L |
| 202 | 115 | Typhoon Zed (AUS) | 5 | G | AUS | 1st | Manikato Stakes | Turf | 1,200 | S |
| 202 | 115 | Valdino (GER) | 3 | G | GER | 1st | Deutsches St. Leger | Turf | 2,800 | E |
| 202 | 115 | Viewed (AUS) | 5 | H | AUS | 1st | Melbourne Cup | Turf | 3,200 | E |
| 202 | 115 | Visionaire (USA) | 3 | C | USA | 1st | King's Bishop Stakes | Dirt | 1,408 | S |
| 202 | 115 | Visit (GB) | 3 | F | GB; USA | 3rd 3rd | Sun Chariot Stakes; Matriarch Stakes | Turf; Turf | 1,609; 1,609 | M M |
| 202 | 115 | Wanderin Boy (USA) | 7 | H | USA | 2nd | Jockey Club Gold Cup | Dirt | 2,012 | I |
| 202 | 115 | War Artist (AUS) | 4 | G | GB | 2nd 2nd 3rd | Duke of York Stakes; Golden Jubilee Stakes; July Cup | Turf; Turf; Turf | 1,207; 1,207; 1,207 | S S S |
| 202 | 115 | War Pass (USA) | 3 | C | USA | 2nd | Wood Memorial Stakes | Dirt | 1,811 | M |

== Top ranked horses ==
The following table shows the top ranked horses overall, the top three-year-olds, the top older horses and the top fillies and mares in the 2008 Rankings. It also shows the leading performers in various subdivisions of each group, which are defined by the distances of races, and the surfaces on which they are run.

All Horses
| | All Surfaces | | Dirt / Artificial | | Turf | |
| All Distances | 130 | Curlin; New Approach | 130 | Curlin | 130 | New Approach |
| Sprint | 123 | Midnight Lute; Sacred Kingdom | 123 | Midnight Lute | 123 | Sacred Kingdom |
| Mile | 130 | Curlin | 130 | Curlin | 127 | Raven's Pass |
| Intermediate | 130 | Curlin; New Approach | 130 | Curlin | 130 | New Approach |
| Long | 128 | Zarkava | 118 | Da' Tara | 128 | Zarkava |
| Extended | 122 | Conduit; Septimus; Yeats | | not listed | 122 | Conduit; Septimus; Yeats |
Three-Year-Olds
| | All Surfaces | | Dirt / Artificial | | Turf | |
| All Distances | 130 | New Approach | 129 | Raven's Pass | 130 | New Approach |
| Sprint | 122 | Weekend Hussler | 119 | Fatal Bullet | 122 | Weekend Hussler |
| Mile | 127 | Raven's Pass | 122 | Big Brown | 127 | Raven's Pass |
| Intermediate | 130 | New Approach | 129 | Raven's Pass | 130 | New Approach |
| Long | 128 | Zarkava | 118 | Da' Tara | 128 | Zarkava |
| Extended | 122 | Conduit | | not listed | 122 | Conduit |
Older Horses
| | All Surfaces | | Dirt / Artificial | | Turf | |
| All Distances | 130 | Curlin | 130 | Curlin | 127 | Duke of Marmalade |
| Sprint | 123 | Midnight Lute; Sacred Kingdom | 123 | Midnight Lute | 123 | Sacred Kingdom |
| Mile | 130 | Curlin | 130 | Curlin | 124 | Good Ba Ba |
| Intermediate | 130 | Curlin | 130 | Curlin | 127 | Duke of Marmalade |
| Long | 126 | Duke of Marmalade | 115 | Muhannak | 126 | Duke of Marmalade |
| Extended | 122 | Septimus; Yeats | | not listed | 122 | Septimus; Yeats |
Fillies and Mares
| | All Surfaces | | Dirt / Artificial | | Turf | |
| All Distances | 128 | Zarkava | 125 | Zenyatta | 128 | Zarkava |
| Sprint | 118 | Ventura | 118 | Ventura | 115 | African Rose; Fleeting Spirit; Seachange |
| Mile | 125 | Goldikova; Zenyatta | 125 | Zenyatta | 125 | Goldikova |
| Intermediate | 125 | Zarkava | 118 | Ginger Punch; Hystericalady; Music Note; Proud Spell | 125 | Zarkava |
| Long | 128 | Zarkava | | not listed | 128 | Zarkava |
| Extended | | not listed | | not listed | | not listed |

== Guide ==
A complete guide to the main table above.

Rank
A horse's position in the list, with the most highly rated at number 1. Each horse is ranked once according to its highest rating. Any lesser ratings for the same horse are not ranked.

Rating
A rating represents a weight value in pounds, with higher values given to horses which showed greater ability. It is judged that these weights would equalise the abilities of the horses if carried in a theoretical handicap race. The minimum rating required for inclusion is 115.

Horse
Each horse's name is followed by a suffix (from the IFHA's International Code of Suffixes) which indicates the country foaled.

Age
The age of the horse at the time it achieved its rating. The racing ages of all horses foaled in a particular part of the world increase simultaneously, regardless of the actual date of foaling.
Dates of age increase by location foaled
| Northern Hemisphere | 1 January |
| South America | 1 July |
| Australia, New Zealand and South Africa | 1 August |

Sex
| C | Colt | Ungelded male horse up to four-years-old |
| F | Filly | Female horse up to four-years-old |
| H | Horse | Ungelded male horse over four-years-old |
| M | Mare | Female horse over four-years-old |
| G | Gelding | Gelded male horse of any age |

Trained
The country where the horse was trained at the time of the rating, abbreviated using the International Code of Suffixes.

Position
The horse's finishing position in the race shown. The actual finishing order can sometimes be amended following an inquiry or a disqualification.
| = | Dead-heat |
| ↑ | Promoted from original finishing position |
| ↓ | Relegated from original finishing position |

Race
The race (or one of the races) for which the horse achieved its rating. A defeated horse can be rated above its higher-placed opponents if it carried more weight.

Surface
The surface of the track on which the race was run, eg. turf or dirt. Synthetic surfaces are described as "artificial".

Distance
The distance of the race in metres. In some countries (eg. Canada, Great Britain, Ireland and the United States), the length of a race is usually expressed in miles and furlongs. These units have been converted to metres to allow for universal comparison.
Common conversions
| 5 furlongs | = 1,006 m | 1 mile and 1½ furlongs | = 1,911 m |
| 6 furlongs | = 1,207 m | 1 mile and 2 furlongs | = 2,012 m |
| 6½ furlongs | = 1,308 m | 1 mile and 2½ furlongs | = 2,112 m |
| 7 furlongs | = 1,408 m | 1 mile and 3 furlongs | = 2,213 m |
| 7½ furlongs | = 1,509 m | 1 mile and 4 furlongs | = 2,414 m |
| 1 mile | = 1,609 m | 1 mile and 6 furlongs | = 2,816 m |
| 1 mile and ½ furlong | = 1,710 m | 2 miles | = 3,219 m |
| 1 mile and 1 furlong | = 1,811 m | 2 miles and 4 furlongs | = 4,023 m |

Category
| | | Metres | Furlongs |
| S | Sprint | 1,000–1,300; 1,000–1,599 (CAN / USA) | 5–6.5; 5–7.99 (CAN / USA) |
| M | Mile | 1,301–1,899; 1,600–1,899 (CAN / USA) | 6.51–9.49; 8–9.49 (CAN / USA) |
| I | Intermediate | 1,900–2,100 | 9.5–10.5 |
| L | Long | 2,101–2,700 | 10.51–13.5 |
| E | Extended | 2,701+ | 13.51+ |

International Code of Suffixes
The following countries have been represented in the WTR as foaling or training locations since the first edition in 2004.
| ARG | Argentina | ITY | Italy |
| AUS | Australia | JPN | Japan |
| BRZ | Brazil | KSA | Saudi Arabia |
| CAN | Canada | NZ | New Zealand |
| CHI | Chile | SAF | South Africa |
| CZE | Czech Republic | SIN | Singapore |
| FR | France | SPA | Spain |
| GB | Great Britain | TUR | Turkey |
| GER | Germany | UAE | United Arab Emirates |
| HK | Hong Kong | USA | United States |
| HUN | Hungary | VEN | Venezuela |
| IRE | Ireland | ZIM | Zimbabwe |

Shading
The shaded areas represent lesser ratings recorded by horses which were more highly rated in a different category. The IFHA publishes this information when the lower rating is the overall top performance in a particular category.
