= Septimus (horse) =

Irish-bred Thoroughbred racehorse

- Sire: Sadler's Wells
- Grandsire: Northern Dancer
- Dam: Caladira
- Damsire: Darshaan
- Sex: Stallion
- Foaled: 4 April 2003
- Country: Ireland
- Colour: Bay
- Breeder: Barronstown Stud & Orpendale
- Owner: Derrick Smith, Susan Magnier & Michael Tabor
- Trainer: Aidan O'Brien
- Record: 13: 8-1-1
- Earnings: £489,119

Major wins
- Beresford Stakes (2005); Dante Stakes (2006); Mooresbridge Stakes (2007); Lonsdale Cup (2007); Doncaster Cup (2007); Curragh Cup (2008); Irish St. Leger (2008)

Awards
- World's top-rated Extended Distance horse (2007, 2008)

Septimus (4 April 2003 – 12 December 2010) was an Irish Thoroughbred racehorse and sire. In a racing career which was frequently interrupted by injury he won eight of his thirteen races between September 2005 and November 2008. He showed very promising form as a juvenile, winning the Beresford Stakes and finishing third when favourite the Racing Post Trophy and went on to win the Dante Stakes by eight lengths in an abbreviated three-year-old campaign. At four he won the Mooresbridge Stakes and was then stepped up in distance to take the Lonsdale Cup and the Doncaster Cup. In his final season he won the Curragh Cup and the Irish St. Leger, taking the latter event by thirteen lengths. He was rated the best horse in the world over extended distances in both 2007 and 2008. He was retired to stud but had fertility problems and died on 12 December 2010 after complications resulting from a gelding operation.

== Background ==
Septimus was a bay horse with a large white star and three white socks bred in Ireland by the Barronstown Stud in partnership with Orpendale, a breeding company associated with the Coolmore Stud organisation. In September 2004 the yearling was consigned by Barronstown to the Goffs sales and was bought for €220,000 by Coolmore's bloodstock agent Dermot "Demi" O'Byrne. He was sent into training with Aidan O'Brien at Ballydoyle. Like many Coolmore horses, the official details of his ownership changed from race to race: he was sometimes listed as being the property of Derrick Smith, whilst on other occasions he was described as being owned by a partnership of Smith, Michael Tabor and Susan Magnier.

He was from the eighteenth crop of foals sired by Sadler's Wells, who won the Irish 2,000 Guineas, Eclipse Stakes and Irish Champion Stakes in 1984 went on to be the Champion sire on fourteen occasions. His dam Caladira who was bred and owned by Aga Khan IV won on her racecourse debut and finished unplaced on her only subsequent start. She was a great-granddaughter of the British broodmare Run Honey (foaled 1946) whose other descendants have included Aloma's Ruler and Cirrus des Aigles.

== Racing career ==
=== 2005: two-year-old season ===
Septimus began his track career in a seven furlong maiden race on 10 September on Leopardstown Racecourse in which he was ridden by Wayne Lordan and won by half a length from his stablemate Arabian Prince. He was then moved up sharply in class for the Group 2 Beresford Stakes over the same distance at the Curragh on 9 October and started 4/6 favourite against five opponents. Ridden by Seamie Heffernan, he tracked the leaders before taking the lead inside the final furlong and won by a length from Rekaab. After the race he was offered at odds of 25/1 for the following year's Epsom Derby.

Two weeks after his win at the Curragh, Septimus was sent to England and moved up in class and distance for the Group 1 Racing Post Trophy over one mile on heavy ground at Doncaster Racecourse. He was made the odds-on favourite but looked to be outpaced in the final stages and finished third to Palace Episode and Winged Cupid.

=== 2006: three-year-old season ===
On 23 April Septimus began his second season with a trip to France for the Prix La Force over 2000 metres at Longchamp Racecourse in which he was well-fancied, but never looked likely to win and finished seventh of the nine runners behind Barastraight. On his next appearance he contested the Dante Stakes (a major trial race for The Derby) over ten and a half furlongs at York Racecourse on 18 May. Racing on soft ground and partnered by Kieren Fallon he started 13/8 favourite ahead of Palace Episode and four other colts. After tracking the leaders he went to the front a quarter of a mile from thefinish and drew right away from his opponents to win by eight lengths from the Michael Stoute-trained Best Alibi. Fallon commented "I'm happy he's got this race under his belt and he deserves it. This horse is very fluent so we could take him anywhere... the way he went away from them there with his ears pricked, you'd have to be impressed".

On 3 June Septimus joined Horatio Nelson, Dylan Thomas and Mountain in a four-horse Ballydoyle entry for the Epsom Derby and started the 17/2 fourth choice in the betting. He was towards the rear of the field from the start and came home twelfth of the seventeen finishers behind Sir Percy. The colt subsequently had injury problems and missed the rest of the season.

In the 2006 World Thoroughbred Racehorse Rankings Septimus was given a rating of 116, making him the 105th best racehorse in the world.

=== 2007: four-year-old season ===
After an absence of over eleven months, Septimus returned in the Group 3 Mooresbridge Stakes over ten furlongs at the Curragh on 7 May 2007. Ridden by Heffernan he was made 4/1 second favourite behind Mustameet, a six-year-old whose wins included the Royal Whip Stakes and the Gladness Stakes whilst the other runners included Championship Point (Predominate Stakes), Fracas (Derrinstown Stud Derby Trial) and Grand Passion (Celebration Stakes). Septimus raced in second place behind Championship Point before taking the lead approaching the final furlong and won by one and a half lengths from Fracas. Following the race O'Brien said "He did that very well – he's a very tough horse. Considering he's been off the track since the Derby that was great as he came back from that race a bit sore. I think he could be a serious horse in the autumn". At Epsom on 1 June the colt returned to the highest class for the Coronation Cup in which he led for most of the way before finishing second to his stablemate Scorpion with Sir Percy and Sixties Icon finishing in sixth and seventh place.

More than eleven weeks after his run at Epsom Septimus returned to the track and was moved up in distance for the Group 2 Lonsdale Cup over two miles at York and started 6/5 favourite against eight opponents including Sergeant Cecil (Ebor Handicap, Cesarewitch Handicap), Distinction (Goodwood Cup), and Percussionist (Yorkshire Cup). Ridden by Johnny Murtagh, Septimus ranked in third place for mot of the way before taking the lead approaching the final furlong and winning by a neck from Balkan Knight. Murtagh was again in the saddle when Septimus returned to Yorkshire and started the 11/10 favourite for the Doncaster Cup over two and a quarter miles on 14 September. Ditinction and Balkan Knight were again in opposition but his most serious rivals appeared to be Allegretto (Goodwood Cup) and Geordieland (Grand Prix de Chantilly). Murtagh settled the colt in third place as Finalmente set the pace and opened up a clear lead. Septimus made steady progress, overtook Finalmente approaching the last quarter mile and accelerated away from his rivals to win "easily" by five lengths. After the race Murtagh commented "He's a very progressive horse and has really improved. He showed he has no problem with the trip... he has a bit of speed, and is a class above those stayers at the moment".

In the 2007 World Thoroughbred Racehorse Rankings Septimus was rated the 17th best racehorse in the world and the best horse over extended distances.

=== 2008: five-year-old season ===
Septimus was off the track for nine and a half months before returning in the Group 3 Curragh Cup over 14 furlongs on 28 June 2008 in which he carried 140 pounds and started the odds-on favourite. After racing in fifth place he took the lead approaching the final furlong and won by two and half lengths from Mores Wells (Ballyroan Stakes) with Peppertree Lane (the winner of the race in 2007) a neck away in third place.

The Irish St. Leger on 13 September at the Curragh was expected to feature a clash between Septimus and his seven-year-old stablemate Yeats, but when Yeats was withdrawn from the contest Septimus was made the 1/3 favourite. The field did not appear to be a strong one, with the only other runners to start at less than 25/1 being Mores Wells, Hasanka (Ballycullen Stakes) and Yellowstone (Gordon Stakes). Heffernan settled the favourite in third place as his stablemate Mikhail Fokhine set the pace from another Ballydoyle outsider New Zealand. Septimus moved up alongside the pacemakers entering the straight, went to the front, and drew away from the field to win "very easily" by thirteen lengths. His win made Aidan O'Brien (who was at the Doncaster St Leger meeting on the day) the first trainer in 73 years to win all five of the Irish Classic Races. O'Brien's wife Anne-Marie addressed the press after the race and said "I’m so happy for everyone associated with Ballydoyle, and we’ve been so lucky that the horses have stayed sound. Septimus got his opportunity today and I’m really thrilled".

For his final racecourse appearance, Septimus, who was being described as "the best stayer in the world", was shipped to Australia to contest the Melbourne Cup over 3200 metres at Flemington Racecourse on 4 November. Starting the 6/1 second favourite he was among the leaders from the start but faded badly in the straight and finished lame in eighteenth place. After the race Murtagh commented "I think we need to examine what type of horse to bring to Australia. Septimus wasn’t the right one".

In the 2008 World Thoroughbred Rankings Septimus was rated the 23rd best racehorse in the world and the equal-best horse over extended distances alongside Conduit and Yeats.

== Stud career ==
Septimus remained in training in 2009 but did not race again. He was retired to stud at the end of the year and was marketed as a National Hunt stallion. Standing at Coolmore's Castle Hyde stud in County Cork he had problems with fertility. He was withdrawn from stud duties and gelded but died from complications arising from the surgery on 12 December 2010.

== Pedigree ==
Pedigree of Septimus (IRE), bay stallion, 2003
| Sire Sadler's Wells (USA) 1981 | Northern Dancer (CAN); 1961 | Nearctic | Nearco |
| Sire Sadler's Wells (USA) 1981 | Northern Dancer (CAN); 1961 | Nearctic | Lady Angela |
| Sire Sadler's Wells (USA) 1981 | Northern Dancer (CAN); 1961 | Natalma | Native Dancer |
| Sire Sadler's Wells (USA) 1981 | Northern Dancer (CAN); 1961 | Natalma | Almahmoud |
| Sire Sadler's Wells (USA) 1981 | Fairy Bridge (USA); 1975 | Bold Reason | Hail To Reason |
| Sire Sadler's Wells (USA) 1981 | Fairy Bridge (USA); 1975 | Bold Reason | Lalun |
| Sire Sadler's Wells (USA) 1981 | Fairy Bridge (USA); 1975 | Special | Forli |
| Sire Sadler's Wells (USA) 1981 | Fairy Bridge (USA); 1975 | Special | Thong |
| Dam Caladira (IRE) 1991 | Darshaan (GB); 1981 | Shirley Heights | Mill Reef |
| Dam Caladira (IRE) 1991 | Darshaan (GB); 1981 | Shirley Heights | Hardiemma |
| Dam Caladira (IRE) 1991 | Darshaan (GB); 1981 | Delsy | Abdos |
| Dam Caladira (IRE) 1991 | Darshaan (GB); 1981 | Delsy | Kelty |
| Dam Caladira (IRE) 1991 | Cape Race (USA); 1974 | Northern Dancer | Nearctic |
| Dam Caladira (IRE) 1991 | Cape Race (USA); 1974 | Northern Dancer | Natalma |
| Dam Caladira (IRE) 1991 | Cape Race (USA); 1974 | Sticky Case | Court Martial |
| Dam Caladira (IRE) 1991 | Cape Race (USA); 1974 | Sticky Case | Run Honey (Family: 9-h) |

- Septimus was inbred 2 × 3 to Northern Dancer, meaning that this stallion appears in both the second and third generations of his pedigree.
