= 2008 Prix de l'Arc de Triomphe =

- Location: Longchamp Racecourse
- Date: October 5, 2008
- Winning horse: Zarkava

The 2008 Prix de l'Arc de Triomphe was a horse race held at Longchamp on Sunday 5 October 2008. It was the 87th running of the Prix de l'Arc de Triomphe.

The winner was Zarkava, a three-year-old filly trained in France by Alain de Royer-Dupré. The winning jockey was Christophe Soumillon.

Zarkava had been a doubtful runner because of the soft ground at Longchamp. Her participation was confirmed just before the start.

== Race details ==
- Sponsor: Qatar Racing and Equestrian Club
- Purse: €4,000,000; First prize: €2,285,600
- Going: Good to Soft
- Distance: 2,400 metres
- Number of runners: 16
- Winner's time: 2m 28.8s

== Full result ==
Pos.	Marg.	Horse	Age	Jockey	Trainer (Country)
1		Zarkava	3	Christophe Soumillon	Alain de Royer-Dupré (FR)
2	2	Youmzain	5	Richard Hills	Mick Channon (GB)
3	½	It's Gino	5	Thierry Thulliez	Pavel Vovcenko (GER)
3	dh	Soldier of Fortune	4	Seamie Heffernan	Aidan O'Brien (IRE)
5	1	Vision d'Etat	3	Ioritz Mendizabal	Eric Libaud (FR)
6	nk	Ask	5	Ryan Moore	Sir Michael Stoute (GB)
7	hd	Duke of Marmalade	4	Johnny Murtagh	Aidan O'Brien (IRE)
8	1	Getaway	5	Olivier Peslier	André Fabre (FR)
9	1	Cima de Triomphe	3	Dario Vargiu	Bruno Grizzetti (ITY)
10	shd	Meisho Samson	5	Yutaka Take	Shigetada Takahashi (JPN)
11	2½	Kamsin	3	Johan Victoire	Peter Schiergen (GER)
12	1½	Papal Bull	5	Jimmy Fortune	Sir Michael Stoute (GB)
13	4	Schiaparelli	5	Frankie Dettori	Saeed bin Suroor (GB)
14	3	Blue Bresil	3	William Mongil	Lionel Larrigade (FR)
15	10	Zambezi Sun	4	Stéphane Pasquier	Pascal Bary (FR)
16	dist	Red Rock Canyon	4	Colm O'Donoghue	Aidan O'Brien (IRE)

- Abbreviations: dh = dead-heat; shd = short-head; hd = head; nk = neck; dist = distance

== Winner's details ==
Further details of the winner, Zarkava.

- Sex: Filly
- Foaled: 31 March 2005
- Country: Ireland
- Sire: Zamindar; Dam: Zarkasha (Kahyasi)
- Owner / Breeder: HH Aga Khan IV
