= Montmartre (horse) =

French-bred Thoroughbred racehorse

- Racing silks of H H Aga Khan
- Sire: Montjeu
- Grandsire: Sadler's Wells
- Dam: Artistique
- Damsire: Linamix
- Sex: Stallion
- Foaled: 18 March 2005
- Country: France
- Colour: Grey
- Breeder: Lagardere Elevage
- Owner: Aga Khan IV
- Trainer: Alain de Royer-Dupré
- Record: 5: 3-1-0
- Earnings: £295,397

Major wins
- Prix du Lys (2008); Grand Prix de Paris (2008)

Montmartre (foaled 18 March 2005) is a French Thoroughbred racehorse and sire. In a brief racing career which lasted from April to July 2008 he won three times from five starts. After finishing second on his debut he won a minor race before running unplaced in the Prix du Jockey Club. He then won the Prix du Lys and went on to record his biggest success with an impressive victory in the Grand Prix de Paris but never recovered from the race and was retired from the track. As a breeding stallion he had some success as a sire of National Hunt horses.

== Background ==
Montmartre is a grey horse bred in France by Lagardere Elevage, a company which managed the bloodstock of the late Jean-Luc Lagardère. During his racing career he was owned by Aga Khan IV and trained by Alain de Royer-Dupré. He was ridden in all of his races by Christophe Soumillon.

He was from the third crop of foals sired by Montjeu whose wins included the Prix du Jockey Club, Irish Derby, Prix de l'Arc de Triomphe and King George VI and Queen Elizabeth Stakes. As a breeding stallion his other progeny included Motivator, Authorized, Pour Moi, Camelot, Scorpion, Masked Marvel, Hurricane Fly, St Nicholas Abbey and Hurricane Run. Montmartre's dam Artistique, from whom he inherited his grey colour, was a good staying filly who won the Prix Berteux in 1999. Artistique was a daughter of Armarama who won the Ribblesdale Stakes and was a half-sister to Kalaglow.

== Racing career ==
=== 2008: three-year-old season ===
Montmartre began his racing career in the Prix Juigné over 2000 metres on heavy ground at Longchamp Racecourse on 6 April and finished second of the twelve runners, beaten a head by the Élie Lellouche trained Magaden. Three weeks later at the same track he recorded his first success in a minor race over 2200 metres, beating Rock Fellow by three quarters of a length. The colt was then moved up sharply in class for the Group 1 Prix du Jockey Club over 2100 metres at Chantilly Racecourse on 1 June but made little impact and came home fifteenth of the twenty runners behind Vision d'Etat, beaten more than twenty lengths by the winner.

Eighteen days after his failure at Chantilly Montmartre started the 1.5/1 favourite for the Group 3 Prix du Lys over 2400 metres at Longchamp. He took the lead 300 metres from the finish and won by two lengths and a short neck from Zack Dream and Watar. On 14 July he was one of thirteen colts to contest the Group 1 Grand Prix de Paris over 2400 metres at Longchamp. The British-trained Doctor Fremantle (winner of the Chester Vase and fourth in the Epsom Derby) started favourite with Montmartre next in the betting at odds of 4.5/1 alongside Prospect Wells (Prix Greffulhe) and Alessandro Volta (Lingfield Derby Trial). The other runners included Curtain Call (Beresford Stakes) Cima de Triomphe (Derby Italiano) and Americain. Montmartre settled in fourth place behind the pacemaker William Hogarth before moving up to take the lead 400 metres from the finish. He accelerated away from his rivals and despite being eased down by Soumillon he came home four lengths clear of the runner-up Prospect Wells. The Aga Khan's spokesman Damian Walker "It's the most impressive performance we have seen from a three-year-old colt this season and he has every chance of returning to Longchamp in October and winning the Arc".

Montmartre was made the ante-post favourite for the Prix de l'Arc de Triomphe after his win, but less than two weeks later his trainer Alain de Royer-Dupré explained that the colt's future plans were in doubt. He said "The Grand Prix was run in a very fast time and on very fast ground and the race has left its mark. He was very stiff after the race and it now all depends on how he recovers. For the moment, he is not sure to run in the Arc".

In the 2008 World Thoroughbred Rankings Montmartre was given a rating of 125, making him the sixth-best racehorse in the world.

== Stud career ==
Montmartre did not race again after his win in the Grand Prix and was retired to become a breeding stallion in France. In December 2014 he was put up for auction at the Arqana Breeding Stock Sale and was bought for €180,000 by Meridian International. He had little success with his runners on the flat but has done better as a sire of jumpers. His offspring include Petite Parisenne (Spring Juvenile Hurdle), Labaik (Supreme Novices' Hurdle), Bigmartre (Future Champion Novices' Chase) and Titi de Montmartre. In 2018 he was based at the Haras du Hoguenet, Lessard-et-le-Chêne, at a fee of €6,500.

== Pedigree ==
Pedigree of Montmartre (FR), grey stallion, 2005
Sire Montjeu (IRE) 1996	Sadler's Wells (USA); 1981	Northern Dancer (CAN)	Nearctic
Sire Montjeu (IRE) 1996	Sadler's Wells (USA); 1981	Northern Dancer (CAN)	Natalma (USA)
Sire Montjeu (IRE) 1996	Sadler's Wells (USA); 1981	Fairy Bridge	Bold Reason
Sire Montjeu (IRE) 1996	Sadler's Wells (USA); 1981	Fairy Bridge	Special
Sire Montjeu (IRE) 1996	Floripedes (FR); 1985	Top Ville (IRE)	High Top
Sire Montjeu (IRE) 1996	Floripedes (FR); 1985	Top Ville (IRE)	Sega Ville (FR)
Sire Montjeu (IRE) 1996	Floripedes (FR); 1985	Toute Cy	Tennyson
Sire Montjeu (IRE) 1996	Floripedes (FR); 1985	Toute Cy	Adele Toumignon (IRE)
Dam Artistique (IRE) 1996	Linamix (FR); 1987	Mendez	Bellypha (IRE)
Dam Artistique (IRE) 1996	Linamix (FR); 1987	Mendez	Miss Carina
Dam Artistique (IRE) 1996	Linamix (FR); 1987	Lunadix	Breton (GB)
Dam Artistique (IRE) 1996	Linamix (FR); 1987	Lunadix	Lutine (GB)
Dam Artistique (IRE) 1996	Armarama (GB); 1989	Persian Bold (IRE)	Bold Lad (IRE)
Dam Artistique (IRE) 1996	Armarama (GB); 1989	Persian Bold (IRE)	Relkarunner (GB)
Dam Artistique (IRE) 1996	Armarama (GB); 1989	Rossitor	Pall Mall (IRE)
Dam Artistique (IRE) 1996	Armarama (GB); 1989	Rossitor	Sonia (Family: 2-i)
