= British Racing School =

Horse racing school in Newmarket, Suffolk, England

The British Racing School (BRS) is one of the two racing schools in England, the other being the National Horseracing College in Doncaster. Established in 1983, it is a charitable trust providing training for people working in the horse racing industry. The school is based in Newmarket, Suffolk, and, as well as apprenticeships for young people, offers a range of courses for jockeys, trainers, stable staff and racing secretaries. The students ride and look after about seventy retired racehorses who live on site.

== History ==
The BRS was established in 1983 on land on the Snailwell Road on the outskirts of Newmarket and officially opened by the then Prince of Wales. The school's 40th anniversary was marked by a visit from Queen Camilla in 2023. In 2012, the school established a Pony Racing course for children without their own ponies. The Pony Academy section was set up in 2021 for local children referred by their teachers or social workers to learn to ride and look after ponies. In 2025, the BRS combined with Hartpury University and Hartpury College to offer a three-year horseracing industry BSc degree programme. At the same time, the school set up a gap-year programme, to include placements in Britain and Australia. The BRS was also awarded the contract to run the Rider Development Pathway, commencing in 2026.

== Governance and funding ==
The BRS is registered as a charity under the name of BRS Education Limited. Julia Budd has been chair of the trustees since 2021; Andrew Braithwaite, previously the finance director, has been the chief executive officer since 2022. As of 2025, the BRS costs approximately £5.4 million a year to run. The main sources of funding are the Department for Education, the British Horseracing Authority, course fees, and donations.

== Notable alumni ==
Graduates of the British Racing School include:

- Paul Hanagan, former champion Flat jockey
- Seb Sanders, former champion Flat jockey
- Sam Thomas, Cheltenham Gold Cup-winning jockey
- Jason Weaver, Classic-winning Flat jockey
