= Ask (horse) =

British-bred Thoroughbred racehorse

- Sire: Sadler's Wells
- Grandsire: Northern Dancer
- Dam: Request
- Damsire: Rainbow Quest
- Sex: Stallion
- Foaled: 23 March 2003
- Country: United Kingdom
- Colour: Bay
- Breeder: Side Hill Stud
- Owner: Andrew Cavendish, 11th Duke of Devonshire; Duke of Devonshire & Susan Magnier; Patrick J Fahey
- Trainer: Michael Stoute
- Record: 19:7-3-2
- Earnings: £812,084

Major wins
- Ormonde Stakes (2007); Cumberland Lodge Stakes (2007); Gordon Richards Stakes (2008); Yorkshire Cup (2009); Coronation Cup (2009); Prix Royal Oak (2009)

Awards
- dunr

Ask (23 March 2003 - June 2024) was a British Thoroughbred racehorse and sire. Unraced as a two-year-old, he showed some promise as a three-year-old in 2006, winning one minor race and finishing fourth in the St Leger. He improved in the following year despite running only three races: he won the Ormonde Stakes and the Cumberland Lodge Stakes and was narrowly beaten in the Canadian International Stakes. He won the Gordon Richards Stakes in 2008 but reached his peak as a six-year-old in the following year, winning the Yorkshire Cup, Coronation Cup and Prix Royal Oak as well as finishing third in the King George VI and Queen Elizabeth Stakes. After a single, unsuccessful start in 2010 his racing career was ended by injury. He was then retired to become a National Hunt stallion in Ireland.

== Background ==
Ask was a bay horse with a white star and snip bred at the Side Hill Stud in Newmarket by his owner the 11th Duke of Devonshire. He was one of the eighteenth crop of foals sired by Sadler's Wells, who won the Irish 2,000 Guineas, Eclipse Stakes and Irish Champion Stakes in 1984 went on to be the Champion sire on fourteen occasions. Ask's dam Request, who failed to win in two races, was owned and bred by Queen Elizabeth II. She was a granddaughter of the Queen's outstanding racemare Highclere, who won the 1000 Guineas and the Prix de Diane in 1974 and whose other descendant include Nashwan, Unfuwain and Deep Impact.

The Duke of Devonshire sent his colt into training with Michael Stoute at Newmarket.

== Racing career ==
=== 2006: three-year-old season ===
Ask made his racecourse debut when finishing third in the Wood Ditton Stakes, for previously unraced three-year-olds at Newmarket Racecourse in April and then finished second when odds-on favourite for a maiden race at Windsor on 3 June. Before his second race a share in the horse had been sold to Susan Magnier of the Coolmore organization. Later that month he started 2/9 favourite in an eight-runner field for a similar event over one and a half miles at Chepstow Racecourse and won easily by seven lengths. He finished unplaced when favourite for a valuable handicap at Goodwood on 2 August and then finished second in the Melrose Handicap at York three weeks later. In both of these starts he was ridden by Ryan Moore, who partnered him in most of his subsequent races. On his final appearance of the year, Ask was stepped up sharply in class and started a 16/1 outsider for the Classic St Leger at Doncaster Racecourse on 9 September. He raced just behind the leaders for most of the way and stayed on in the straight to finish fourth of the eleven runners, three and a half lengths behind the winner Sixties Icon.

=== 2007: four-year-old season ===
Before the start of the 2007 season, Ask entered the ownership of Patrick J. Fahey. On his first appearance as a four-year-old, Ask started 5/2 second favourite behind the 2005 St Leger winner Scorpion in the Group 3 Ormonde Stakes over thirteen and a half furlongs at Chester Racecourse on 11 May. Ridden by Kerrin McEvoy he took the lead two furlong out and accelerated clear to win "comfortably" by two lengths from Scorpion. Following his win at Chester, Ask was off the course for four and a half months before returning at Ascot Racecourse on 30 September in the Group 3 Cumberland Lodge Stakes. He started the 11/4 second favourite behind the Aidan O'Brien-trained Honolulu who had finished third in the St Leger two weeks earlier. After being restrained by Moore in the early stages he took the lead approaching the final furlong and won by two lengths from Zaham, with Honolulu three quarter of a length away in third. Three weeks later Ask was sent to Canada to contest the Canadian International Stakes at Woodbine Racecourse and started favourite in a twelve-runner field. After being held up in the early stages and turning into the straight he produced a strong late run but failed by a short head to overhaul the American gelding Cloudy's Knight.

=== 2008: five-year-old season ===
Ask began his third season in the Group Three Gordon Richards Stakes over ten furlongs at Sandown Park Racecourse on 25 April. He started 8/13 favourite and won by half a length from Hattan, who had won the Winter Derby in March. In his next three races, Ask was tried against the best middle-distance horses in Europe. He finished fifth behind Duke of Marmalade in the Prince of Wales's Stakes at Royal Ascot, fifth behind the same horse in the King George VI and Queen Elizabeth Stakes in July and sixth behind Zarkava in the Prix de l'Arc de Triomphe at Longchamp Racecourse on 5 October. Ask was dropped in class for the Group Three St Simon Stakes at Newbury Racecourse three week later. Ridden by Christophe Soumillon he started odds-on favourite but finished last of the seven runners behind Bucellati.

=== 2009: six-year-old season ===
On his first appearance of 2009, Ask was moved up in distance for the Group Two Yorkshire Cup over fourteen furlongs at York on 15 May. Moore restrained the horse in the first half of the race before making steady progress and taking the lead approaching the last quarter mile. In the closing stages Ask drew away from his opponents to win by six lengths from Blue Bajan. The Racing Post described the performance as a "thrilling" display and said that he "destroyed" the opposition.

On 5 June 2009 Ask started at odds of 5/1 for the 106th running of the Coronation Cup over one and a half miles at Epsom. His opponents included Youmzain (the 2/1 favourite), Look Here, Duncan, Frozen Fire, Eastern Anthem (Dubai Sheema Classic) and Buccelati. Frozen Fire led from the outsider Expresso Star with Moore positioning Ask in third before moving the six-year-old into the lead two furlongs out. Youmzain quickly moved up alongside, and both Look Here and Duncan made rapid progress on the outside to challenge for the lead. In a four-way struggle to the line, Ask rallied after looking beaten and prevailed by a nose from Youmzain, with Look Here a nose away in third and Duncan three-quarters of a length back in fourth place. Commenting on the horse's first win at the highest level Ryan Moore said "I'm just delighted as he deserves one. He's been knocking on the door for a long time, and the steady pace didn't really suit him. He was very game up the straight as twice he was beat, and he battled home really well."

On 25 July at Ascot, Ask (ridden by Olivier Peslier) ran for the second time in the King George VI and Queen Elizabeth Stakes. In a finish dominated by Michael Stoute-trained runners he finished third behind his four-year-old stablemates Conduit and Tartan Bearer. Ask ended his season with a run in the Prix Royal Oak over 3100 metres at Longchamp Racecourse on 25 October and started 7/4 favourite ahead of the five-time Group One winner Schiaparelli, the Irish St. Leger runner-up Clowance and the Prix Chaudenay winner Manighar. Ask raced in third place as Schiaparelli set the pace and then went three lengths clear of the field in the straight. In the closing stages Ask steadily reeled in the German horse, taking the lead 100 metres from the finish and winning by one and a half lengths. The result was only confirmed after a lengthy enquiry by the racecourse stewards into interference allegedly caused by Ask early in the straight.

=== 2010: seven-year-old season ===
Ask remained in training as a seven-year-old and was trained with the Ascot Gold Cup as his objective. At Royal Ascot on 17 June, Ask started 11/4 favourite for the Gold Cup ahead of Manifest (Yorkshire Cup), Kite Wood (Prix Vicomtesse Vigier), Kasbah Bliss (Prix Gladiateur) and Bannaby (Prix du Cadran). He was in contention until the last half mile but then weakened and finished fifth of the twelve runners, some thirty lengths behind the winner Rite of Passage. He was being prepared for a run in the Irish St. Leger when he sustained a tendon injury in a training gallop and was retired from racing.

== Assessment ==
In the 2008 edition of the World's Best Racehorse Rankings, Ask was given a rating of 119, making him the 52nd best racehorse in the world. In the following year he moved up to 121 and was ranked in 33rd place.

Michael Stoute said that "Ask was as tough and genuine a racehorse as one could wish to train".

== Stud record ==
Ask was retired from racing to become a breeding stallion for Coolmore at the Beeches Stud in County Waterford where he was advertised as a National Hunt stallion. He stood for fee of €3,000. After eight years he moved to Dunraven Stud near Bridgend in Wales, and later went to Willow Wood Stud at Tarporley in Cheshire. His death aged 21 was announced on 11 June 2024.

== Pedigree ==
Pedigree of Ask (GB), bay stallion, 2003
| Sire Sadler's Wells (USA) 1981 | Northern Dancer (CAN); 1961 | Nearctic | Nearco |
| Sire Sadler's Wells (USA) 1981 | Northern Dancer (CAN); 1961 | Nearctic | Lady Angela |
| Sire Sadler's Wells (USA) 1981 | Northern Dancer (CAN); 1961 | Natalma | Native Dancer |
| Sire Sadler's Wells (USA) 1981 | Northern Dancer (CAN); 1961 | Natalma | Almahmoud |
| Sire Sadler's Wells (USA) 1981 | Fairy Bridge (USA); 1975 | Bold Reason | Hail To Reason |
| Sire Sadler's Wells (USA) 1981 | Fairy Bridge (USA); 1975 | Bold Reason | Lalun |
| Sire Sadler's Wells (USA) 1981 | Fairy Bridge (USA); 1975 | Special | Forli |
| Sire Sadler's Wells (USA) 1981 | Fairy Bridge (USA); 1975 | Special | Thong |
| Dam Request (GB) 1997 | Rainbow Quest (USA); 1981 | Blushing Groom | Red God |
| Dam Request (GB) 1997 | Rainbow Quest (USA); 1981 | Blushing Groom | Runaway Bride |
| Dam Request (GB) 1997 | Rainbow Quest (USA); 1981 | I Will Follow | Herbager |
| Dam Request (GB) 1997 | Rainbow Quest (USA); 1981 | I Will Follow | Where You Lead |
| Dam Request (GB) 1997 | Highbrow (FR); 1985 | Shirley Heights | Mill Reef |
| Dam Request (GB) 1997 | Highbrow (FR); 1985 | Shirley Heights | Hardiemma |
| Dam Request (GB) 1997 | Highbrow (FR); 1985 | Highclere | Queen's Hussar |
| Dam Request (GB) 1997 | Highbrow (FR); 1985 | Highclere | Highlight (Family: 2-f) |
