= Labaik =

French-bred Thoroughbred racehorse

- Labaik's racing silks
- Sire: Montmartre
- Dam: Avanguardia
- Damsire: Choisir
- Sex: Gelding
- Foaled: 27 February 2012
- Died: 2020
- Country: France
- Colour: Grey
- Breeder: Ecurie Des Monceaux
- Owner: Aidan J O'Ryan
- Trainer: Gordon Elliott
- Record: 18:3,1,0
- Earnings: £106,505

Major wins
- Supreme Novices Hurdle (2017)

Labaik (27 March 2011 – 2020) was a French thoroughbred racehorse who won the 2017 Supreme Novices Hurdle at the Cheltenham Festival.

== Racing career ==
Labaik was bred in France and began his racing career with trainer John Hammond, on the flat. After eight races with a best finish of second at Deauville - he switched briefly to trainer Owen Burrows in England and later to Gordon Elliott in Ireland.

Labaik was successful taking two victories in late 2016 in Ireland, first at Punchestown and later the For Auction Novice Hurdle at Navan.

His greatest success however would come at the Cheltenham Festival with jockey Jack Kennedy. A 25/1 outsider, Labaik won the Supreme Novices Hurdle by over 2 lengths from favourite Melon.

Labaik generated a lot of press interest due to his repeated refusals to start races, most notably at Punchestown in 2017. This led to a Turf Club investigation into the refusal to start rules.

Labaik ran again on April 28 in the Punchestown Champion Hurdle finishing fourth. After the race it was revealed by trainer Gordon Elliott that he had suffered an injury and would likely never run again.

Labaik died in 2020 from complications of colic.

== Ownership and legal seizure ==
Labaik was registered as owned by Aidan J O'Ryan, a bloodstock agent. In 2017 Labaik was seized by the Criminal Assets Bureau in Ireland as his purchase for €28,000 was linked to an organized crime and drug dealer John Boylan. Gardai sent armed officers to Punchestown to seize the horse. In October 2019, it was ruled by the Irish High Court that Boylan had purchased Labaik using proceeds from crime.

During the high court case, it was revealed the ownership of the horse was structured as 90% Boylan, 5% O'Ryan and 5% Gordon Elliott the trainer. It was outlined during the case that Elliott had never spoken to owner Boylan. At the same testimony, the value of Labaik was raised up with Elliott estimating his value went up to €300,000 following his Cheltenham win but now may be 'worthless' after the injury sustained at Punchestown.
