= Look Here (horse) =

British Thoroughbred racehorse (2005–2019)

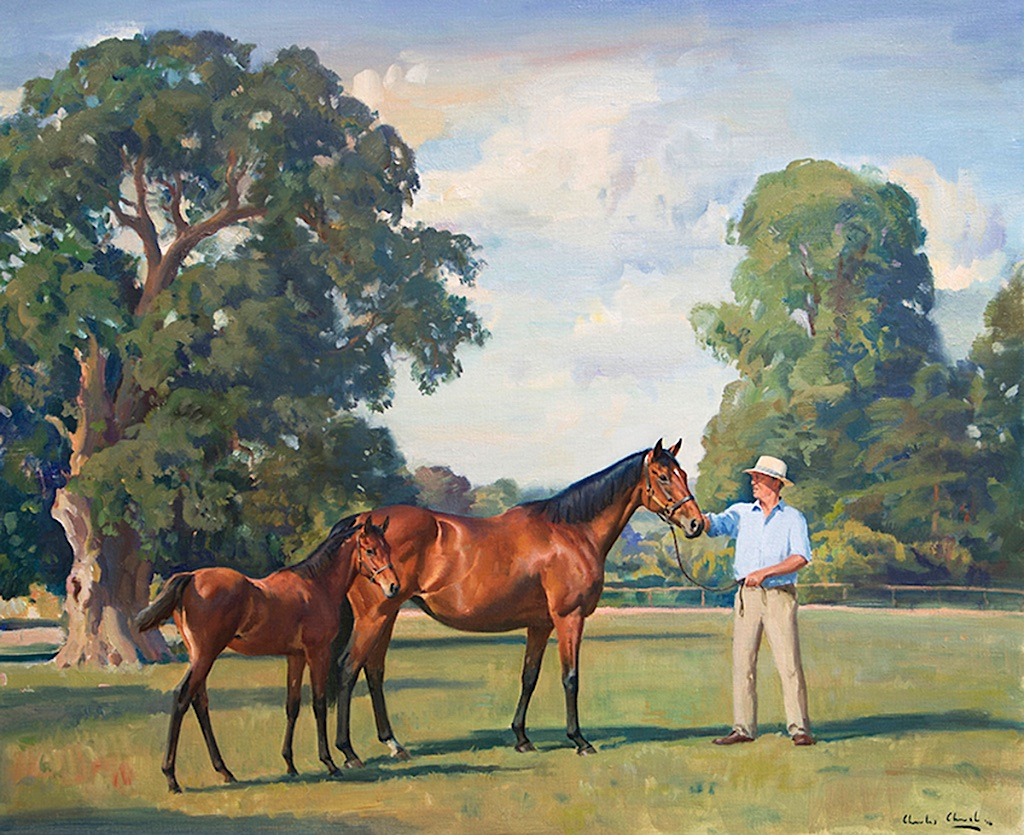
- Look Here: Winner of the 2008 Oaks at Epsom, painting by Charles Church presented to the Jockey Club in May 2014
- Sire: Hernando
- Grandsire: Niniski
- Dam: Last Look
- Damsire: Rainbow Quest
- Sex: Mare
- Foaled: 28 February 2005
- Country: United Kingdom
- Colour: Bay
- Breeder: Lawn Stud
- Owner: Julian Richmond-Watson
- Trainer: Ralph Beckett
- Record: 9: 2-2-3
- Earnings: £349,705

Major wins
- Oaks (2008)

Look Here (foaled 28 February 2005, died of colic November 2019) was a British Thoroughbred racehorse and broodmare best known for winning the 2008 Epsom Oaks. In a racing career which lasted from October 2007 to October 2009 the filly ran nine times and won two races. After winning her only race as a two-year-old, Look Here finished second on her three-year-old debut. She then won the Classic Oaks over one and a half miles at Epsom, in which she was a 33/1 outsider. Look Here never won another race, but finished third in the St Leger Stakes, Coronation Cup and Pretty Polly Stakes.

== Background ==
Look Here was a bay mare with a white star bred by her owner, Julian Richmond-Watson's Lawn Stud in Northamptonshire, England. Richmond-Watson, the senior steward of the Jockey Club, operated on a small scale: at the time he had only four mares at stud. Look Here was sired by the French stallion Hernando, who won the Prix du Jockey Club and finished second in the Prix de l'Arc de Triomphe. As a breeding stallion, his best known offspring is the multiple Group One winner Sulamani. Look Here was one of seven winners produced by her unraced dam Last Look.

The filly was trained throughout her career by Ralph Beckett at Whitsbury, Hampshire.

== Racing career ==
=== 2007: two-year-old season ===
Look Here made her first and only appearance of 2006 at Salisbury Racecourse in October. She started a 16/1 outsider for the Southampton Maiden Stakes, a one-mile race open to colts and fillies, with the colt Doctor Fremantle being made 1/3 favourite. Ridden by Kerrin McAvoy, Look Here took the lead inside the last quarter mile and stayed out the distance well to beat Doctor Fremantle by two and a half lengths.

=== 2008: three-year-old season ===
On her three-year-old debut, Look Here was sent to contest the Listed Oaks Trial Stakes at Lingfield Park, where she was ridden for the first time by Seb Sanders. After being restrained in the early stages she finished strongly to take second place, three quarters of a length behind Miracle Seeker. Sanders later admitted that he had given the filly a poorly judged ride.

The 2008 running of the Epsom Oaks appeared likely to be dominated by Irish-trained fillies: the Jim Bolger-trained Lush Lashes started favourite ahead of Katiyra (John Oxx) and Chinese White (Dermot Weld), whilst Aidan O'Brien's Ballydoyle stable was represented by five runners. Only two of the sixteen runners started at longer odds than the 33/1 shot Look Here. Sanders settled his filly in the middle of the field before moving forward in the straight. Look Here took the lead two furlongs from the finish and went clear of the field, winning comfortably by three and three quarter lengths from Moonstone and Katiyra. The win was a first in a Classic for both Beckett and Sanders.

Look Here was off the racecourse for more than three months before returning in September for the St Leger Stakes at Doncaster Racecourse. She had been prevented from running in the Yorkshire Oaks by a training setback in August. Racing against twelve colts and one other filly, Look Here was made 11/4 second favourite for the one and three quarter mile classic, behind Aidan O'Brien's irish Derby winner Frozen Fire. Ridden by Eddie Ahern, Look Here made steady progress in the straight but could never reach the lead and finished third behind Conduit and Unsung Heroine, beaten more than six lengths by the winner.

=== 2009: four-year-old season ===
Look Here stayed in training as a four-year-old, but failed to win in five races. Her best performance came on her seasonal debut in the Coronation Cup over the Oaks course and distance. Sanders held the filly up at the back of the field before challenging on the outside in the straight. She finished strongly but was beaten in a three-way photo finish by Ask and Youmzain. Later in June Look Here was sent to Ireland and started favourite for the Pretty Polly Stakes at the Curragh Racing over a mile and a quarter for the first time, she finished third to Dar Re Mi. Beckett explained that the filly was unsuited by the very soft ground. She made little impact in the King George VI and Queen Elizabeth Stakes at Ascot in July, finishing unplaced behind Conduit. Look Here was dropped to Group Three class for her next start in the Arc Trial at Newbury but after leading in the straight she was caught in the last stride and beaten a short head by Doctor Fremantle, the colt she had beaten on her racecourse debut. In October, Look Here traveled to Canada for the E. P. Taylor Stakes at Woodbine Racetrack. She finished unplaced behind Lahaleeb; she was subsequently retired from racing without another victory after the 2008 Epsom Oaks.

== Assessment and honours ==
In the 2008 World Thoroughbred Rankings, Look Here was given a rating of 119, making her the highest-rated British filly of her generation, and the equal third best three-year-old filly in the world behind Zarkava (128) and Goldikova (125).

== Stud record ==
Look Here retired to Lawn Stud to become a broodmare for Julian Richmond-Watson at his Wakefield Lodge Estate. Her first foal, a chestnut colt sired by Sea the Stars, was born at the British National Stud in April 2011.

- 2011 Sea Here (GB) : Chesnut colt, foaled 2 April, by Sea the Stars (IRE) – placed once from five starts in England 2013–14
- 2012 Barren
- 2013 Hereawi (GB) : Bay filly, foaled 11 March, by Dubawi (IRE) – won 2 races and placed 4 times from 9 starts in England 2015–16 for earnings of £25,094
- 2014 Here And Now (GB) : Bay colt by Dansili (GB) – won 2 races and placed twice from 4 starts to date 10.05.17

== Pedigree ==
Pedigree of Look Here (GB), bay mare, 2005
Sire Hernando 1990	Niniski; 1976	Nijinsky	Northern Dancer
Sire Hernando 1990	Niniski; 1976	Nijinsky	Flaming Page
Sire Hernando 1990	Niniski; 1976	Virginia Hills	Tom Rolfe
Sire Hernando 1990	Niniski; 1976	Virginia Hills	Ridin' Easy
Sire Hernando 1990	Whakilyric; 1984	Miswaki	Mr. Prospector
Sire Hernando 1990	Whakilyric; 1984	Miswaki	Hopespringseternal
Sire Hernando 1990	Whakilyric; 1984	Lyrism	Lyphard
Sire Hernando 1990	Whakilyric; 1984	Lyrism	Pass A Glance
Dam Last Look (GB) 1995	Rainbow Quest; 1981	Blushing Groom	Red God
Dam Last Look (GB) 1995	Rainbow Quest; 1981	Blushing Groom	Runaway Bride
Dam Last Look (GB) 1995	Rainbow Quest; 1981	I Will Follow	Herbager
Dam Last Look (GB) 1995	Rainbow Quest; 1981	I Will Follow	Where You Lead
Dam Last Look (GB) 1995	Derniere Danse; 1987	Gay Mecene	Vaguely Noble
Dam Last Look (GB) 1995	Derniere Danse; 1987	Gay Mecene	Gay Missile
Dam Last Look (GB) 1995	Derniere Danse; 1987	Dance Quest	Green Dancer
Dam Last Look (GB) 1995	Derniere Danse; 1987	Dance Quest	Polyponder (Family 1-l)
