= Julia Budd (businesswoman) =

British businesswoman

- Occupation: Chairman of Epsom Racecourse

Julia Budd is a British businesswoman and chairman of Epsom Racecourse.

== Biography ==
Julia Budd studied experimental psychology and statistics at Oxford University and graduated with an MBA from INSEAD in Paris.

She was a management consultant with Bain & Company, before moving into executive search and recruitment. She was a founding partner of the Zygos Partnership and joined the board of Russell Reynolds Associates in 2017. She is a member of the BEIS Professional and Business Services Sector Council.

In addition to her professional career, Julia Budd is a leading member of the Jockey Club and serves as Deputy Senior Steward. She is a trustee of the British Horseracing Education and Standards Trust. Since 2015, she has been Chairman of Epsom Racecourse.
