= Tartan Bearer =

Irish-bred Thoroughbred racehorse

- Sire: Spectrum
- Grandsire: Rainbow Quest
- Dam: Highland Gift
- Damsire: Generous
- Sex: Colt
- Foaled: 2005
- Country: Ireland
- Colour: Chestnut
- Breeder: Ballymacoll
- Owner: Ballymacoll
- Trainer: Michael Stoute
- Record: 8: 4-3-1
- Earnings: £843,787

Major wins
- Dante Stakes (2008); Gordon Richards Stakes (2009)

Tartan Bearer is an Irish thoroughbred race horse. He raced eight times and won three of these, being placed on his other five starts. He was second three times and third once in the four Group 1 races he contested.

He was bred by his owners, the Ballymacoll Stud, and was trained throughout his career by Sir Michael Stoute. He was retired as a five-year-old after failing to appear in the 2010 season due to injury.

== Career ==
=== Two-year-old ===
His first start, at Newmarket, showed promise as he was repeatedly blocked against the rail before closing to finish a head behind Foolin Myself. It was decided he had learned enough from the experience and he was then put away for the winter with a three-year-old campaign ahead of him.

=== Three-year-old ===
He won his maiden at Leicester racecourse the following April fashion before going on to York for the Dante Stakes, now the most important of all the Derby trials. He was relatively unfancied for the race and started fourth in the betting behind favourite Twice Over, who had won the Craven Stakes earlier in the season. Tartan Bearer held off a challenge from Frozen Fire by a head.

This year the Derby had an open look to it with many horses having a decent chance: Curtain Call, Casual Conquest, Frozen Fire, New Approach and Doctor Fremantle being all considered contenders. Tartan Bearer went off at 6/1. He started slowly, and jockey Ryan Moore settled him in at the back of the field. As some of the horses began to struggle with the slope heading down towards Tattenham Corner, Tartan Bearer moved past runners and was brought wide coming into the straight. He quickened on the outside and got to the front at the same time as New Approach, who had weaved a passage down the inside rail. New Approach went past, and Tartan Bearer began to close again but at the line was held by half a length: 4½ lengths in front of Casual Conquest. Like his full-brother Golan before him, Tartan Bearer had finished second in the Derby.

Six of the horses he had beaten at Epsom reopposed Tartan Bearer in the Irish Derby the following month. He started the even money favourite, with no New Approach in the line up. He ran midpack early in the race and approached the leaders 2½ furlongs out. However, just as he seemed about to take the lead, the horse on his inside, Alessandra Volta, drifted off the rail, bumping Tartan Bearer and carrying him across the track. Tartan Bearer lost his momentum and Frozen Fire, Alessandra Volta's stablemate, shot past him down the outside to win. Alessandra was disqualified with Tartan Bearer being promoted to third place.

=== Four-year-old ===
His new campaign started when he won the Group Three Gordon Richards Stakes at Sandown at one mile and two furlongs. Tartan Bearer got up with a late charge to win by a head from Pipedreamer. His next start came at Royal Ascot. He was sent off favourite but travelled wide throughout. Accelerating through the field, he got to the front 100 yards from the line only for the French-trained Vision d'Etat to pass him on his outside.

His final start in the King George VI and Queen Elizabeth Stakes, the richest race of the season with a million up for grabs, was seen as a straight match between himself and stablemate, The St Leger winner of the previous year, Conduit. Ryan Moore plumped for Conduit, who beat Tartan Bearer to favouritism. Tartan Bearer was first to make his move from the rear and, similar to Vision d'Etat at Royal Ascot, Conduit tracked him through and passed him half a furlong out. Tartan Bearer was, for the third time, beaten in a Group One by half a length. Plans to keep him in training ended due to more injury problems.
