= Seb Sanders =

English jockey

Personal information
- Born: 25 September 1971 (age 54) Birmingham, United Kingdom
- Occupation: Jockey (retired)

Horse racing career
- Sport: Horse racing

Major racing wins
- Cheveley Park Stakes (2010); Qatar Derby (2010); Golden Jubilee Stakes (2008); Oaks (2008); Prix de Diane (2006); Nunthorpe Stakes (2004); Preis von Europa (2004); Irish 2,000 Guineas (2004); July Cup (1997)

Racing awards
- British Champion Flat Jockey (2007); British Champion Apprentice Jockey (1995)

Significant horses
- Hooray, Beethoven, Kingsgate Native, Look Here, Confidential Lady, Bahamian Pirate, Albanova, Bachelor Duke, Compton Place

Seb Sanders (born 25 September 1971 in Birmingham, England) is a former flat race jockey. Sanders was British Champion Flat Jockey in 2007, a title he shared with Jamie Spencer.

== Early life ==
Born in Birmingham, Sanders' father, a plumber introduced him to racing by a chance meeting of Tamworth based trainer Bryan McMahon. Sanders himself was keen to be a professional footballer for Birmingham City, but his father was able to secure him work at McMahon's yard. After which, McMahon sent Sanders to the British Racing School in Newmarket.

== Career ==
Sanders rode his first winner on 12 June 1990 on Band On The Run at Pontefract. In 1994, Sanders moved to Reg Akehurst's yard in Epsom and won the 1995 Champion Apprentice title, with 61 winners. Sanders' first Group 1 success came in the 1997 July Cup where he won on the 50-1 outsider, Compton Place.

In 2004, Sanders joined Sir Mark Prescott in Newmarket replacing George Duffield. Sanders and Prescott had a close relationship, and in his opening year with Prescott, Sanders won the Preis von Europa with Albanova for Kirsten Rausing. He would also win the Irish 2,000 Guineas onboard Bachelor Duke and the Nunthorpe Stakes with Bahamian Pirate . In 2006, Sanders won the Prix de Diane, giving Prescott his first Classic success, that later saw Sanders receive an eight day ban.

In the 2007 championship season Seb Sanders shared the British flat racing Champion Jockey's title with Jamie Spencer. On the final day of the season at Doncaster, their seasonal totals finished level at 190-190, when Spencer won the last race of the season. The following year, Sanders added two more Group 1 successes to his tally with Kingsgate Native in the Golden Jubilee Stakes and Look Here winning the Oaks at Epsom. Sanders' last British Group 1 victory came for Sir Mark Prescott in the Cheveley Park Stakes with Hooray. In the same year, he won the Qatar Derby with Beethoven. In his later career, Sanders was noted for struggling with weight and notably at Goodwood he rode a race not wearing boots.

== Retirement ==
Sanders took a hiatus from racing in Britain in 2016. Later, he would be revealed as a work rider for Godolphin at Charlie Appleby's yard in Newmarket. Alongside his work riding, Sanders is a member of the Sky Sports Racing broadcast team. In 2022, Sanders returned to ride in the Leger Legends race at Doncaster.

== Major wins ==
(United Kingdom) Great Britain

- Cheveley Park Stakes - (1) - Hooray (2010)
- Golden Jubilee Stakes - (1) - Kingsgate Native (2008)
- July Cup - (1) - Compton Place (1997)
- Nunthorpe Stakes - (1) - Bahamian Pirate (2004)
- Oaks - (1) - Look Here (2008)

France

- Prix de Diane - (1) - Confidential Lady (2006)

Germany

- Preis von Europa - (1) - Albanova (2004)

(Republic of Ireland) Ireland

- Irish 2,000 Guineas - (1) - Bachelor Duke (2004)

Qatar

- Qatar Derby - (1) - Beethoven (2010)
