= Conduit (horse) =

Irish Thoroughbred racehorse

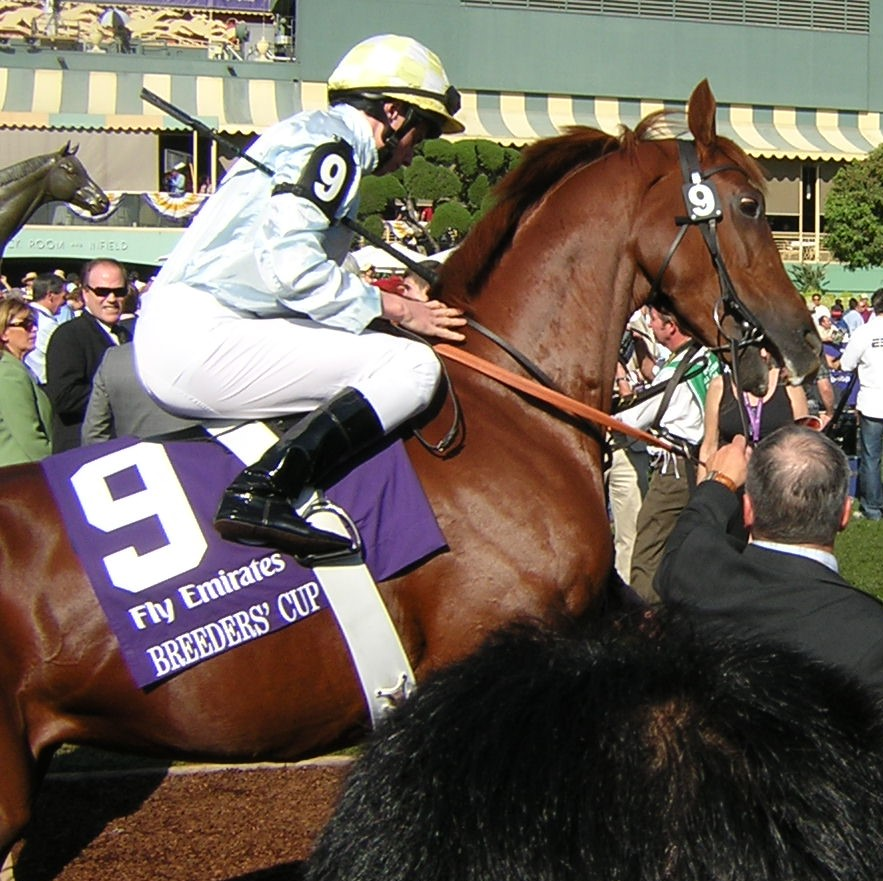
- Conduit before the 2008 Breeders' Cup
- Sire: Dalakhani
- Grandsire: Darshaan
- Dam: Well Head
- Damsire: Sadler's Wells
- Sex: Stallion
- Foaled: 17 June 2005
- Country: Ireland
- Colour: Chestnut
- Breeder: Ballymacoll Stud Farm Ltd.
- Owner: Ballymacoll Stud
- Trainer: Sir Michael Stoute
- Record: 15: 7-2-3
- Earnings: £3,551,847

Major wins
- Gordon Stakes (2008); St. Leger Stakes (2008); Breeders' Cup Turf (2008 & 2009); King George VI and Queen Elizabeth Stakes (2009)

Awards
- American Champion Male Turf Horse, 2008; Racehorse Owners' Association Outstanding Older Horse 2009

Conduit (17 June 2005 – 17 June 2020) was a Thoroughbred racehorse and sire. In a career that lasted from August 2007 to November 2009 he won seven of his fifteen starts, including four at Group One/Grade I level.

In Europe, he won the St. Leger Stakes in 2008 and Britain's most prestigious weight-for-age race, the King George VI and Queen Elizabeth Stakes in 2009. He is known internationally for being the only horse to record two outright wins in the Breeders' Cup Turf. In each of his Breeders' Cup wins, he ran under 2:24.00, recording the two fastest times in the race's history up to that time. Conduit stood as a breeding stallion in Japan and Ireland.

== Background ==
Racing silks of Ballymacoll

Bred and raced by Ballymacoll Stud of County Meath, Conduit was sired by 2003 European Horse of the Year Dalakhani out of the mare, Well Head, a daughter of fourteen-time Champion Sire Sadler's Wells. Dalakhani has proved to be a successful sire, especially of middle and long distance performers. Apart from Conduit, his best runners have included Reliable Man (Prix du Jockey Club), Duncan (Irish St. Leger), Moonstone (Irish Oaks) and Integral (Falmouth Stakes). Well Head was unraced half sister to the Champion Stakes winner Spectrum. Apart from Conduit, her best foal was the Great Voltigeur Stakes winner, Hard Top.

Well Head died shortly after Conduit's birth, and the colt foal was bottle-fed by the Ballymacoll staff before being fostered by a Vanner mare. As a yearling, he was "bullied" by the other colts at the stud and was separated for his own safety. The yearling who was mainly responsible for the attacks was later named Tartan Bearer.

Conduit was sent into training with Michael Stoute at the Freemason Lodge stables at Newmarket, Suffolk. He was ridden in all but two of his races by Ryan Moore.

== Racing career ==
=== 2007: two-year-old season ===
Conduit began his racing career by running unplaced in a maiden race on the July Course at Newmarket in August 2007. Later in the same month, he finished third as 6/4 favourite in a similar race at Kempton staying on under pressure, but apparently lacking the pace to reach the leaders.

A month later, he recorded his first win in a maiden at Wolverhampton, coming from off the pace to win by three quarters of a length on the polytrack surface. The fact that his five rivals went on to win a total of three minor races in their combined careers gives an indication of the level of the competition, and Conduit's end of season rating of 79 suggested that he was far below top class.

=== 2008: three-year-old season ===
Conduit's three-year-old season was one of notable progress, with his official rating improving by 46lbs.

He began by finishing third in a minor handicap at Sandown in April. In his next start, he was made 11/8 favourite for a much more valuable handicap at the Derby meeting at Epsom. Held up in last place by Ryan Moore, Conduit was switched to the outside in the straight and, in the words of the Racing Post "stormed clear" to win by six lengths. Although no firm plans for Conduit were announced, the bookmaking firm Ladbrokes immediately offered him at odds of 14/1 for the St Leger. On the same course just over two hours later, the stable's "best" colt Tartan Bearer finished second to New Approach in the Derby.

Although the bare form of the race (he was rated 98 for his win) indicated that he was still well below top class, he was sent to Royal Ascot for the King Edward VII Stakes and made 11/4 favourite. Conduit appeared to be traveling well when he was hampered entering the straight and was unable to catch the leader, Campanologist, finishing second by three quarters of a length. The Guardian's correspondent called him "one of the unluckiest losers" at the meeting.

The performance was enough to establish Conduit as a contender for the St Leger, and he was next sent to Goodwood for the Gordon Stakes. He won at odds of 1/2, hanging to the left under pressure as he beat outsider Donegal by a head. Stoute described the performance as "workmanlike", but pointed out that the small field and "muddling" pace did not suit his colt. Conduit's price for the St Leger was unchanged at 7/1.

The St Leger attracted a strong field including the Irish Derby winner Frozen Fire, who was made favourite ahead of the Oaks winner Look Here, with Conduit starting at 8/1. Ryan Moore chose to ride Stoute's other runner, Doctor Fremantle, who had finished fourth in the Derby, and the ride on Conduit was picked up by Frankie Dettori. Dettori held the colt up in the early stages before making "smooth" progress in the straight to take the lead from Enroller two furlongs out. Conduit went clear and ran on strongly to the finish, winning by three lengths from the Irish-trained filly Unsung Heroine despite "wandering" from a straight course. The win in the St. Leger marked the first for trainer Michael Stoute after twenty-three unsuccessful attempts. For jockey Frankie Dettori, it was his fifth St. Leger win.

Stoute had originally planned to rest the colt after the St Leger, but Conduit came out of the race exceptionally well and was brought back to a mile and a half and fast ground for the Breeders' Cup Turf at Santa Anita Park. Moore held up Conduit in the early stages before moving the colt up into a challenging position entering the straight. Having been switched to the outside, Conduit produced a strong late run to catch Eagle Mountain inside the final furlong and win by one and a half lengths. His winning time of 2:23.42 was the fastest recorded in the twenty-five runnings of the race, although, as the Breeders' Cup has been run on many different tracks, times are not directly comparable. After the race, Stoute praised the colt and suggested that he could improve further, saying, "He's a beautifully balanced horse with a good turn of foot, and he keeps getting better."

=== 2009: four-year-old season ===
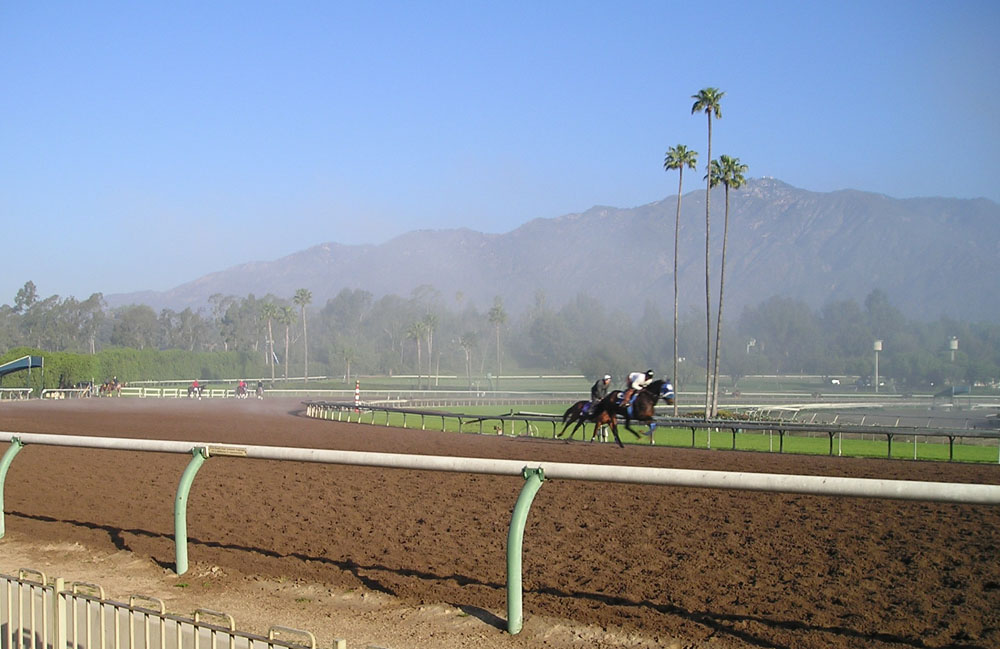
Santa Anita Park, the scene of Conduit's two Breeders' Cup wins

Conduit began his four-year-old season by giving seven pounds to eleven rivals in the Brigadier Gerard Stakes at Sandown. He took the lead a furlong out but was caught on the line and beaten a nose by Derby Italiano winner Cima de Triomphe. In the Eclipse Stakes over the same course and distance, he met Cima de Triomphe at level weights in an exceptionally strong field which included Twice Over, Rip Van Winkle and the odds-on favourite Sea the Stars. Held up in the early stages, Conduit was moved up into third behind Sea the Stars and Rip Van Winkle a furlong out. Although he stayed on well, he could make no impression on the two Irish colts and finished third, beaten five and a half lengths, but five lengths clear of Cima de Triomphe in fourth.

Conduit was then aimed the King George VI and Queen Elizabeth Stakes at Ascot and was made 13/8 favourite. Conduit's preparation for the race was highly unusual. The Ballymacoll Stud received a series of messages threatening to kill the horse if he ran in the race. The police were alerted, and the British Horseracing Authority arranged extra security for Conduit on his journey to Ascot. A man was later arrested and convicted of "threatening to damage property".

In the Ascot race, Frozen Fire and Look Here opposed Conduit again, but his main rival in the betting was his stable companion Tartan Bearer, who started at 7/2 after a win in the Gordon Richards Stakes and a narrow defeat at Royal Ascot. As usual, Conduit was held up, before moving up and being switched to the outside to make his challenge in the straight. Tartan Bearer took the lead from Golden Sword a furlong out but was immediately challenged by Conduit. Inside the final furlong, Moore drove Conduit out to overtake Tartan Bearer (bumping him as he did so) and won by one and three quarter lengths. They were followed home by the other Stoute runner, Ace, giving the trainer the rare achievement of being responsible for the first three in a championship race. Moore received a three-day ban for causing interference in the closing stages but said that he "wasn't going to start pulling him around to correct him just as he was going to win". The manager of the Ballymacoll stud was also present to recall Conduit's early troubles with Tartan Bearer.

The Prix de l'Arc de Triomphe at Longchamp in October entailed another meeting with Sea the Stars, who had dominated the flat season in Europe. Conduit made progress in the straight before losing out to Youmzain and Cavalryman in a three-way photo for second.

In November, despite press rumours that suggested he would bypass the race, Conduit traveled back to America for the Breeders' Cup, run for the second successive year at Santa Anita. He was made odds-on favourite against six opponents for the Turf. The American gelding Presious Passion led from the start and ran the first half mile in 45.14, opening up a lead of at least eight lengths. Conduit was held up before moving into second at the start of the straight, although he stumbled after colliding with the filly Dar Re Mi. Conduit's "relentless charge" took him past Presious Passion a furlong and a half out, and although the gelding rallied "gamely", the colt won by half a length. The winning time of 2:23.75 was the second fastest recorded in the race, behind only Conduit's 2008 win. The normally taciturn Moore said of Conduit, "He's very game. He's a great horse – a once in a lifetime horse". His record of two wins in the race had previously been achieved by High Chaparral, although High Chaparral's second win was achieved in a dead heat with Johar.

On his final start, Conduit was sent to Tokyo, where he finished fourth of the eighteen runners, behind Vodka in the Japan Cup.

== Race record ==
Date	Race	Dist (f)	Course	Class	Prize (£K)	Odds	Runners	Placing	Margin	Time	Jockey	Trainer
10 August 2007	Wilson Browne Maiden Stakes	7	Newmarket July	M	4	7/1	20	7	2.75	1:26.59	Ryan Moore	Michael Stoute
29 August 2007	Digibet Maiden Stakes	8	Kempton	M	3	6/4	10	2	2.25	1:40.65	Ryan Moore	Michael Stoute
22 September 2007	EBF Maiden Stakes	9	Wolverhampton	M	3	10/11	6	1	0.75	1:49.60	Jamie Spencer	Michael Stoute
25 April 2008	Bet365.com Handicap	10	Sandown	H	6	3/1	11	3	2.5	2:10.44	Ryan Moore	Michael Stoute
7 June 2008	totesportcasino.com Stakes	10	Epsom	H	31	11/8	12	1	6	2:06.37	Ryan Moore	Michael Stoute
20 June 2008	King Edward VII Stakes	12	Ascot	2	134	11/4	9	2	0.75	2:31.24	Ryan Moore	Michael Stoute
29 July 2008	Gordon Stakes	12	Newmarket Rowley	3	39	1/2	6	1	Head	2:37.14	Ryan Moore	Michael Stoute
13 September 2008	St. Leger Stakes	14.5	Doncaster	1	283	8/1	14	1	3	3.07.92	Frankie Dettori	Michael Stoute
25 October 2008	Breeders' Cup Turf	12	Santa Anita Park	1	866	7/2	11	1	1.5	2:23.42	Ryan Moore	Michael Stoute
28 May 2009	Brigadier Gerard Stakes	10	Sandown	3	36	11/4	12	2	Nose	2:06.60	Ryan Moore	Michael Stoute
4 July 2009	Eclipse Stakes	10	Sandown	1	283	9/2	10	3	5.5	2:03.40	Ryan Moore	Michael Stoute
25 July 2009	King George VI and Queen Elizabeth Stakes	12	Ascot	1	567	13/8	9	1	1.75	2:28.73	Ryan Moore	Michael Stoute
4 October 2009	Prix de l'Arc de Triomphe	12	Longchamp	1	2219	8/1	19	4	2.5	2:26.30	Ryan Moore	Michael Stoute
7 November 2009	Breeders' Cup Turf	12	Santa Anita Park	1	1125	10/11	7	1	0.5	2:23.75	Ryan Moore	Michael Stoute
29 November 2009	Japan Cup	12	Tokyo	1	1947	39/10	18	4	2.75	2:22.40	Ryan Moore	Michael Stoute

.

== Assessment ==
In the 2008 World Thoroughbred Racehorse Rankings, Conduit was ranked the sixth best horse in the world with a rating of 126. In the 2009 Rankings, he was assigned a mark of 125, placing him seventh in the world.

Conduit was awarded the Eclipse Award as American Champion Male Turf Horse for 2008 and finished runner-up to Gio Ponti for the same award in 2009.

On 3 December 2009 Conduit was awarded the ROA/Sportingbet.com Outstanding Older Horse for 2009 by British Racehorse Owners' Association.

== Stud career ==
Conduit was retired to stud and stood at Big Red Farm, Hokkaido, Japan. His first foals were born in 2011. He was purchased in the summer of 2015 to stand at Tullyraine House in a deal brokered through John Weld, and arrived at the Suffern family's stud near Banbridge, Northern Ireland. He sustained what was described as an "acute brain injury" in late May 2020 and Died on 17 June 2020 at Tullyraine. The stud's owner Hugh Suffern commented "He was an extraordinary horse, I've never dealt with a horse that had the strength of character that he had. He was a very sweet, gentle horse but extremely single-minded too."

== Pedigree ==
Pedigree of Conduit (IRE), chestnut stallion, 2005
Sire Dalakhani (IRE) 2000	Darshaan; 1981	Shirley Heights	Mill Reef
Sire Dalakhani (IRE) 2000	Darshaan; 1981	Shirley Heights	Hardiemma
Sire Dalakhani (IRE) 2000	Darshaan; 1981	Delsy	Abdos
Sire Dalakhani (IRE) 2000	Darshaan; 1981	Delsy	Kelty
Sire Dalakhani (IRE) 2000	Daltawa; 1989	Miswaki	Mr. Prospector
Sire Dalakhani (IRE) 2000	Daltawa; 1989	Miswaki	Hopespringseternal
Sire Dalakhani (IRE) 2000	Daltawa; 1989	Damana	Crystal Palace
Sire Dalakhani (IRE) 2000	Daltawa; 1989	Damana	Denia
Dam Well Head (IRE) 1989	Sadler's Wells; 1981	Northern Dancer	Nearctic
Dam Well Head (IRE) 1989	Sadler's Wells; 1981	Northern Dancer	Natalma
Dam Well Head (IRE) 1989	Sadler's Wells; 1981	Fairy Bridge	Bold Reason
Dam Well Head (IRE) 1989	Sadler's Wells; 1981	Fairy Bridge	Special
Dam Well Head (IRE) 1989	River Dancer; 1983	Irish River	Riverman
Dam Well Head (IRE) 1989	River Dancer; 1983	Irish River	Irish Star
Dam Well Head (IRE) 1989	River Dancer; 1983	Dancing Shadow	Dancer's Image
Dam Well Head (IRE) 1989	River Dancer; 1983	Dancing Shadow	Sunny Valley (Family: 1-l)
