= Michael Stoute =

British racehorse trainer (born 1945)

Sir Michael Stoute
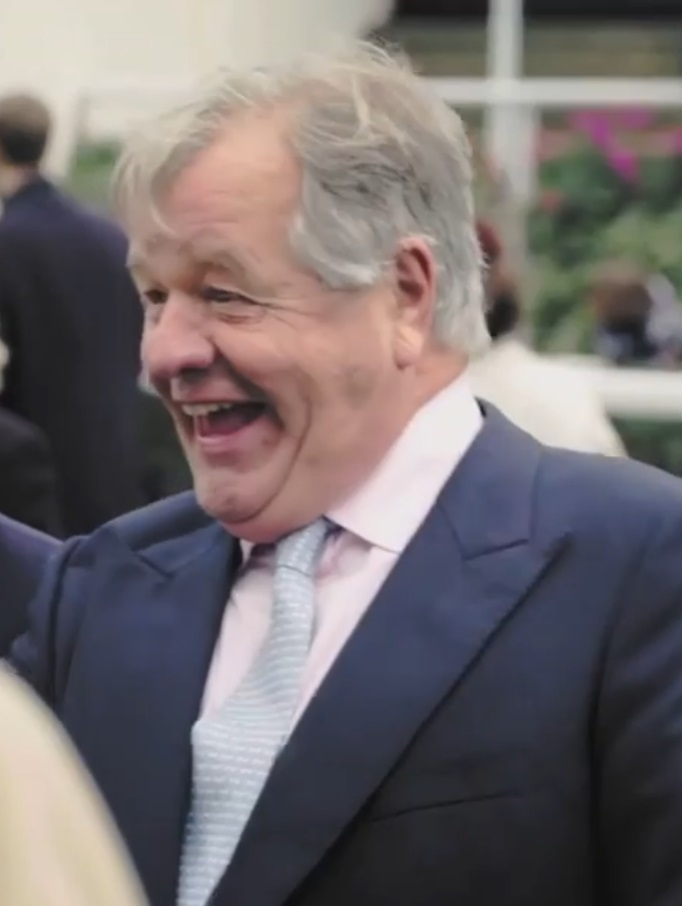
- Sir Michael Stoute in 2022

Personal information
- Born: 22 October 1945 (age 81) Barbados
- Occupation: Trainer

Horse racing career
- Sport: Horse racing

Major racing wins
- British Classic Race wins: 2,000 Guineas (5); 1,000 Guineas (2); Epsom Oaks (2); Epsom Derby (6); St. Leger Stakes (1)

Honours
- Champion Trainer (1981, 1986, 1989, 1994, 1997, 2000, 2003, 2005, 2006, 2009); British Champions Series Hall of Fame (2023)

Significant horses
- Shergar, Marwell, Royal Heroine, Shareef Dancer, Shahrastani, Shadeed, Green Desert, Kribensis, Zilzal, Ezzoud, Gay Gallanta, Opera House, Singspiel, Pilsudski, Petrushka, Kalanisi, Daliapour, Golan, Russian Rhythm, Kris Kin, North Light, Notnowcato, Islington, Conduit, Harbinger, Workforce, Estimate, Ulysses, Desert Crown

Sir Michael Ronald Stoute (born 22 October 1945) is a Barbadian British Thoroughbred horse trainer in flat racing.

== Career ==
Stoute, whose father was the Chief of Police for Barbados, left the island in 1964 at the age of 19 to become an assistant to trainer Pat Rohan and began training horses on his own in 1972. His first win as a trainer came on 28 April 1972 when Sandal, a horse owned by Stoute's father, won at Newmarket Racecourse in England. Since then, he has gone on to win races all over the globe, including victories in the Dubai World Cup, the Breeders Cup, the Japan Cup and the Hong Kong Vase.

He was knighted in the 1998 Birthday Honours for promotion of sports tourism in Barbados. He was the only trainer in the 20th century to win an English Classic in five successive seasons and has been Champion Trainer ten times (1981, 1986, 1989, 1994, 1997, 2000, 2003, 2005, 2006 and 2009). He was the trainer for Kribensis, who won the Triple Crown of Hurdling, in the 1989/90 racing season. Stoute also trained Shergar, arguably his most famous horse, who won the 1981 Epsom Derby and was later stolen, presumably by the IRA.

In 2009, three horses trained by Stoute—Conduit, Tartan Bearer and Ask—pulled off a rare feat when the trio made a clean sweep of the placings at the King George VI and Queen Elizabeth Stakes. In all, the horses took home $1,787,000 of the $2,008,945 prizemoney in Britain's richest horserace. Those wins helped him regain his Champion Trainer title in 2009, winning a total of £3,372,287 in prize money.

In 2013, he trained the Queen's horse Estimate to Gold Cup victory at Royal Ascot. He was invited to ride in the King's procession at Royal Ascot 2023.

Stoute trained horses at Freemason Lodge Stables on the Bury Road in Newmarket.

On 10 September 2024, Stoute announced his intention to retire at the end of the season.

== Major wins ==
(United Kingdom) Great Britain

- 1,000 Guineas – (2) – Musical Bliss (1989), Russian Rhythm (2003)
- 2,000 Guineas – (5) – Shadeed (1985), Doyoun (1988), Entrepreneur (1997), King's Best (2000), Golan (2001)
- Ascot Gold Cup – (2) – Shangamuzo (1978), Estimate (2013)
- Champion Hurdle – (1) – Kribensis (1990)
- Champion Stakes – (3) – Pilsudski (1997), Kalanisi (2000), Bay Bridge (2022)
- Cheveley Park Stakes – (3) – Marwell (1980), Gay Gallanta (1994), Regal Rose (2000)
- Commonwealth Cup - (1) - Eqtidaar (2018)
- Coronation Cup – (5) – Saddlers' Hall (1992), Opera House (1993), Singspiel (1997), Daliapour (2000), Ask (2009)
- Coronation Stakes – (4) – Sonic Lady (1986), Milligram (1987), Exclusive (1998), Russian Rhythm (2003)
- Christmas Hurdle - (2) - Kribensis (1988, 1989)
- Derby – (6) – Shergar (1981), Shahrastani (1986), Kris Kin (2003), North Light (2004), Workforce (2010), Desert Crown (2022)
- Dewhurst Stakes – (1) – Ajdal (1986)
- Diamond Jubilee Stakes - (1) - Dream of Dreams (2021)
- Eclipse Stakes – (6) – Opera House (1993), Ezzoud (1994), Pilsudski (1997), Medicean (2001), Notnowcato (2007), Ulysses (2017)
- Falmouth Stakes – (6) – Royal Heroine (1983), Sonic Lady (1986, 1987), Lovers Knot (1998), Integral (2014), Veracious (2019)
- Fighting Fifth Hurdle - (1) - Kribensis (1989)
- Fillies' Mile – (2) – Untold (1985), Red Bloom (2003)
- Diamond Jubilee Stakes – (1) – Dafayna (1985)
- Haydock Sprint Cup – (3) – Green Desert (1986), Ajdal (1987), Dream of Dreams (2020)
- International Stakes – (6) – Shardari (1986), Ezzoud (1993, 1994), Singspiel (1997), Notnowcato (2006), Ulysses (2017)
- July Cup – (3) – Marwell (1981), Green Desert (1986), Ajdal (1987)
- King George VI and Queen Elizabeth Stakes – (6) – Shergar (1981), Opera House (1993), Golan (2002), Conduit (2009), Harbinger (2010), Poet's Word (2018)
- King's Stand Stakes – (1) – Marwell (1981)
- Lockinge Stakes – (8) – Scottish Reel (1986), Safawan (1990), Soviet Line (1995, 1996), Medicean (2001), Russian Rhythm (2004), Peeress (2006), Mustashry (2019)
- Nassau Stakes – (7) – Triple First (1977), Optimistic Lass (1984), Kartajana (1990), Hawajiss (1994), Islington (2002), Russian Rhythm (2003), Favourable Terms (2004)
- Nunthorpe Stakes – (2) – Blue Cashmere (1974), Ajdal (1987)
- Oaks – (2) – Fair Salinia (1978), Unite (1987)
- Prince of Wales's Stakes – (4) – Hard Fought (1981), Stagecraft (1991), Poet's Word (2018), Crystal Ocean (2019)
- Queen Anne Stakes – (3) – Kalanisi (2000), Medicean (2001), No Excuse Needed (2002)
- Queen Elizabeth II Stakes – (3) – Shadeed (1985), Milligram (1987), Zilzal (1989)
- Racing Post Trophy – (1) – Dilshaan (2000)
- St. James's Palace Stakes – (1) – Shaadi (1989)
- St. Leger Stakes – (1) – Conduit (2008)
- Sun Chariot Stakes – (4) – Triple First (1977), Kartajana (1990), Peeress (2005), Integral (2014)
- Sussex Stakes – (3) – Sonic Lady (1986), Zilzal (1989), Among Men (1998)
- Triumph Hurdle - (1) - Kribensis (1988)
- Yorkshire Oaks – (9) – Fair Salinia (1978), Sally Brown (1985), Untold (1986), Hellenic (1990), Pure Grain (1995), Petrushka (2000), Islington (2002, 2003), Quiff (2004)

Canada

- Canadian International Stakes – (3) – Singspiel (1996), Hillstar (2014), Cannock Chase (2015)
- E.P. Taylor Stakes – (1) – Ivor's Image (1986)

France

- Grand Prix de Saint-Cloud – (3) – Gamut (2004), Mountain High (2007), Spanish Moon (2009)
- Prix de l'Arc de Triomphe – (1) – Workforce (2010)
- Prix du Moulin de Longchamp – (1) – Sonic Lady (1986)
- Prix de l'Abbaye de Longchamp – (1) – Marwell (1981)
- Prix de l'Opéra – (4) – Royal Heroine (1983), Bella Colora (1985), Petrushka (2000), Zee Zee Top (2003)
- Prix Royal-Oak – (2) – Allegretto (2007), Ask (2009)

Germany

- Bayerisches Zuchtrennen – (2) – Greek Dance (2000), Linngari (2008)
- Grosser Preis von Baden – (1) – Pilsudski (1996)

Hong Kong

- Hong Kong Bowl – (1) – Soviet Line (1994)
- Hong Kong Vase – (1) – Daliapour (2000)

(Republic of Ireland) Ireland

- Irish 1,000 Guineas – (1) – Sonic Lady (1986)
- Irish 2,000 Guineas – (1) – Shaadi (1989)
- Irish Champion Stakes – (2) – Cézanne (1994), Pilsudski (1997)
- Irish Derby – (3) – Shergar (1981), Shareef Dancer (1983), Shahrastani (1986)
- Irish Oaks – (6) – Fair Salinia (1978), Colorspin (1986), Unite (1987), Melodist (1988, dead heat), Pure Grain (1995), Petrushka (2000)
- Matron Stakes – (2) – Favourable Terms (2003), Echelon (2007)
- Pretty Polly Stakes – (1) – Promising Lead (2008)
- Tattersalls Gold Cup – (2) – Opera House (1992), Notnowcato (2007)

Italy

- Gran Criterium - (1) - Northern Tempest (1983)
- Oaks d'Italia – (2) – Ivor's Image (1986), Melodist (1988)

Japan

- Japan Cup – (2) – Singspiel (1996), Pilsudski (1997)

United Arab Emirates

- Dubai Sheema Classic – (1) – Fantastic Light (2000)
- Dubai World Cup – (1) – Singspiel (1997)

United States

- Beverly D. Stakes - (1) - Dank (2013)
- Breeders' Cup Filly & Mare Turf – (3) – Islington (2003), Dank (2013), Queen's Trust (2016)
- Breeders' Cup Mile - (1) - Expert Eye (2018)
- Breeders' Cup Turf – (4) – Pilsudski (1996), Kalanisi (2000), Conduit (2008, 2009)
