= Vision d'Etat =

French Thoroughbred racehorse

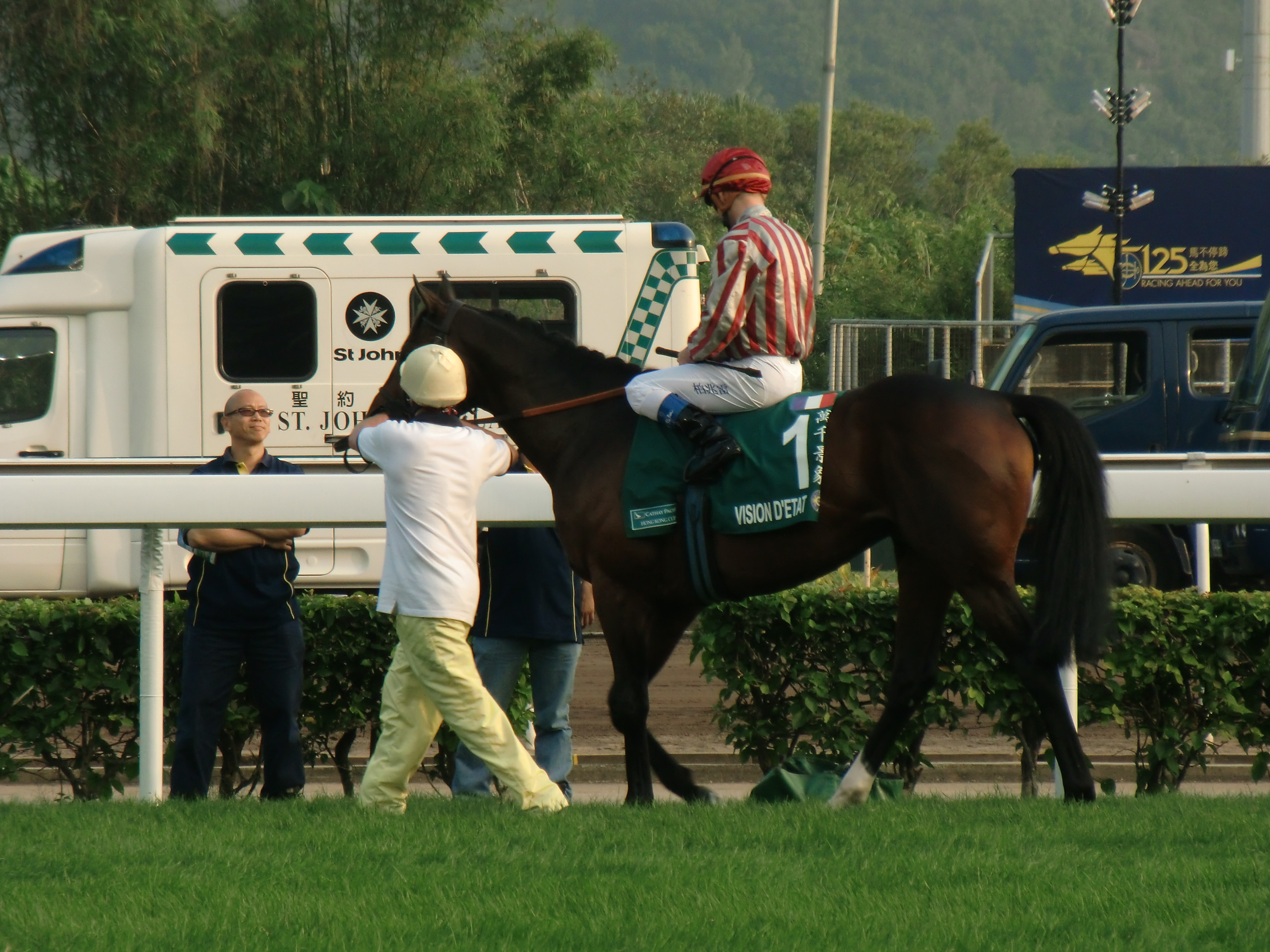
- Vision d'Etat
- Sire: Chichicastenango
- Grandsire: Smadoun
- Dam: Uberaba
- Damsire: Garde Royale
- Sex: Stallion
- Foaled: 2005
- Country: France
- Colour: Bay
- Breeder: Gaetan Gilles
- Owner: Jacques Detre & Vicky Libaud
- Trainer: Eric Libaud
- Record: 17: 10-2-1
- Earnings: £2,512,824

Major wins
- Prix Niel (2008); Prix Ganay (2009); Prince of Wales's Stakes (2009); Hong Kong Cup (2009); French Classic Race wins: Prix du Jockey Club (2008)

Vision d'Etat (foaled April 20, 2005 in Maine-et-Loire, died in March 25, 2018) was a French Thoroughbred racehorse.

== Background ==
Vision d'Erat was sired by Group One winner Chichicastenango and out of the mare Uberaba, he was bought for €39,000 by Jacques Detre and trainer Eric Libaud's wife, Vicky.

== Racing career ==
At age two, Vision d'Etat won the Prix le Pompier at the Les Sables-d'Olonne racecourse and the Prix de la Malmontagne at the Fontainebleau racecourse. At age three, he won the Prix Alcantara II at Saint-Cloud Racecourse, and at Chantilly Racecourse, both the Prix de Suresnes and the prestigious French Classic, the Prix du Jockey Club. His last outing in mid September was at Longchamp Racecourse where he won the Prix Niel. Undefeated in his first six starts, on October 5, 2008 Vision d'Etat finished fifth in France's most prestigious race, the Prix de l'Arc de Triomphe.

Vision d'Etat began his 2009 campaign in early April with a third-place finish in the Prix d'Harcourt. On April 26 he won the Group One, Prix Ganay. On 17 June 2009, he won the Prince of Wales's Stakes at Royal Ascot, the horse came up the inside from last place to the land the 1m 2f race. A second placing in the Prix Foy and a defeat in the Prix de l'Arc de Triomphe followed, before he dropped back to his favoured 2000 metre distance when winning the Hong Kong Cup at Sha Tin.

Vision d'Etat started his 2010 campaign with a 12th placing in the Dubai World Cup. He returned to win a Group 3 in August, before ending his career with a second placing in the Champion Stakes and a fourth in the Hong Kong Cup.

Since 2011, Vision d'Etat stood stud at Haras de Grandcamp until his death in 2018.

== Pedigree ==
Pedigree of Vision d'Etat
Sire Chichicastenango 1998	Smadoun; 1990	Kaldoun	Caro
Sire Chichicastenango 1998	Smadoun; 1990	Kaldoun	Katana
Sire Chichicastenango 1998	Smadoun; 1990	Mossma	Tip Moss
Sire Chichicastenango 1998	Smadoun; 1990	Mossma	Ticma
Sire Chichicastenango 1998	Smala; 1993	Antheus	Northern Dancer
Sire Chichicastenango 1998	Smala; 1993	Antheus	Apachee
Sire Chichicastenango 1998	Smala; 1993	Small Partie	Fabulous Dancer
Sire Chichicastenango 1998	Smala; 1993	Small Partie	Summer Parties
Dam Uberaba 1986	Garde Royale; 1980	Mill Reef	Never Bend
Dam Uberaba 1986	Garde Royale; 1980	Mill Reef	Milan Mill
Dam Uberaba 1986	Garde Royale; 1980	Royal Way	Sicambre
Dam Uberaba 1986	Garde Royale; 1980	Royal Way	Right Away
Dam Uberaba 1986	Ile d'Amour; 1974	Montevideo	Honeyway
Dam Uberaba 1986	Ile d'Amour; 1974	Montevideo	Fair Nicolle
Dam Uberaba 1986	Ile d'Amour; 1974	Old England	Wild Risk
Dam Uberaba 1986	Ile d'Amour; 1974	Old England	Lady Berry
