= Frozen Fire =

German-bred Thoroughbred racehorse

- Sire: Montjeu
- Grandsire: Sadler's Wells
- Dam: Flamingo Sea
- Damsire: Woodman
- Sex: Colt
- Foaled: 2005
- Country: Germany
- Colour: Bay
- Breeder: Jürgen & Wolfgang Hoyer
- Owner: Michael Tabor, Derrick Smith, Sue Magnier
- Trainer: Aidan O'Brien
- Record: 6: 2-1-0
- Earnings: £660,070

Major wins
- Irish Derby (2008)
- Last updated on September 15, 2008

Frozen Fire (born 2005) is a thoroughbred horse sired by Montjeu from the dam Flamingo Sea, who won the 2008 Irish Derby.
