= Northern Dancer sire line =

Line of descent from Northern Dancer

The following list shows the line of descent for major winners from the Northern Dancer sire line, tracking patrilineal descent from the stallion dubbed by the New York Times in 1990 "the dominant progenitor of his breed". It focuses on winners of the principal three-year-old Classic races, as these have long been used to evaluate a stallion's success, and the highest quality races for older horses based on International Federation of Horseracing Authorities rankings. A few other highly prestigious races from around the world have been included as well.

Northern Dancer's first major winner was Nijinsky, who swept the English Triple Crown in 1970. Nijinsky in turn established himself as a leading sire, as did several other of Northern Dancer's sons, especially Danzig, Storm Bird (through his son Storm Cat) and Sadler's Wells. Modern descendants of Northern Dancer's sire line include American Triple Crown winner Justify (2018) and the majority of recent English Classic winners including the undefeated Frankel.

Although not covered by the following list, Northern Dancer's influence is magnified in modern pedigrees by the success of several of his male descendants as broodmare sires. Triple Crown winner American Pharoah and leading sire Tapit are just two examples of horses who descend from Northern Dancer in an indirect line.

== Races included and number of winners ==
The following races were selected based on notability (for example, the English Classic and American triple crown races), quality (as measured by the IFHA ranking of the top 100 G1 races), and geography (to sample racing from around the world). This list also shows how many winners of the given race descend from the Northern Dancer sire line as of 8 July 2023 (not including Northern Dancer's own wins in the Kentucky Derby, Preakness and Queen's Plate).

Three-year-old classics:

- 2000 Guineas – 27
- 1000 Guineas – 24
- Epsom Derby – 31
- Epsom Oaks – 24
- St Leger – 22
- Kentucky Derby – 8
- Preakness Stakes – 12
- Belmont Stakes – 9
- Kentucky Oaks – 10
- Coaching Club American Oaks (CCAO) – 6
- Poule d'Essai des Poulains – 28
- Poule d'Essai des Pouliches – 18
- Prix du Jockey Club – 22
- Prix de Diane – 22
- Irish 2000 Guineas – 30
- Irish 1000 Guineas – 24
- Irish Derby – 37
- Irish Oaks – 24
- Deutsches Derby – 15
- Randwick Guineas (Note: Prior to 2006, the race was known as the Canterbury Guineas) – 19
- Rosehill Guineas – 16
- Australian Derby – 15
- Australian Oaks – 14
- Satsuki Sho (Japanese 2000 Guineas) – 5
- Oka Sho (Japanese 1000 Guineas) – 7
- Tokyo Yushun (Japanese Derby) – 7
- Yushun Himba (Japanese Oaks) – 11
- Kikuka Sho (Japanese St. Leger) – 3

Top rated races:

- Black Caviar Lightning – 19/22 (Note: Black Caviar won the Lightning three times, after which it was renamed in her honour. Mahogany won the race twice)
- Dubai World Cup - 6/7 (Note: Thunder Snow won the Dubai World Cup twice)
- Dubai Sheema Classic – 9
- Queen Elizabeth Stakes (AUS) – 9/11 (Note: Grand Armee and Addeybb both won two renewals of the Queen Elizabeth)
- Champions Mile (Hong Kong) - 10/12 (Note: Beauty Generation and Golden Sixty both won the Champions Mile twice)
- Queen Elizabeth II Cup (QEII Cup – Hong Kong) – 15/17 (Note: Eishin Preston and Viva Pataca both won the QEII Cup twice)
- Metropolitan Handicap (Met Mile) – 8
- Prince of Wales's Stakes – 18
- Takarazuka Kinen – 6
- Eclipse Stakes – 24
- King George VI and Queen Elizabeth Stakes (King George) – 26/28 (Note: Enable won the King George three times)
- Whitney Stakes – 8
- Sussex Stakes – 28/29 (Note: Frankel won two renewals of the Sussex)
- Prix Jacques le Marois - 22/25 (Note: Miesque, Spinning World and Palace Pier all won the Prix Jacques le Marois twice)
- International Stakes – 22/23 (Note: Ezzoud won two renewals of the International Stakes)
- Pacific Classic – 8/9 (Note: Skimming won the Pacific Classic twice)
- Irish Champion Stakes - 27/29 (Note: Dylan Thomas and Magical both won two renewals of the Irish Champion)
- Prix Vermeille - 24/25 (Note: Treve won two renewals of the Prix Vermeille)
- Prix de l'Arc de Triomphe - 26/29 (Note: For the Arc de Triomphe, there have been 24 different winners from the Northern Dancer sire line, who accounted for 26 renewals of the race (both Treve and Enable won twice))
- Queen Elizabeth II Stakes – 25
- Champion Stakes – 19/21 (Note: Alborada and Cracksman both won two renewals of the Champion Stakes)
- Cox Plate – 12/15 (Note: Sunline, Northerly and So You Think each won the Cox Plate twice)
- Breeders' Cup Mile - 17/22 (Note: For the Breeders' Cup Mile, there have been 16 winners of 21 renewals (Miesque, Lure and Wiseman Dan won twice, Goldikova three times)
- Breeders' Cup Distaff – 10/11 (Note: Beholder won two renewals of the Distaff)
- Breeders' Cup Turf – 18/19 (Note: High Chaparral won two renewals of the Breeders' Cup Turf)
- Breeders' Cup Classic — 7
- Japan Cup – 5
- Hong Kong Sprint – 9/12 (Note: Sacred Kingdom and Mr Stunning both won the Hong Kong Sprint twice)
- Arima Kinen – 4

Other races of interest:

- Cheltenham Gold Cup - 11/12 (Note: Al Boum Photo won the Cheltenham Gold Cup twice)
- Ascot Gold Cup – 17/24 (Note: Drum Taps and Kayf Tara both Gold Cup twice, Stradivarius won it three times, and Yeats won it four times)
- Durban July Handicap (South Africa) – 19
- King's Plate (Canada) (Note: The King's Plate, Canada's premier race for three-year-olds, was known as the Queen's Plate during the reigns of Queen Victoria and Queen Elizabeth II) – 19
- Melbourne Cup – 11/13 (Note: Makybe Diva won three renewals of the Melbourne Cup)

== Major winners in the Northern Dancer Sire Line ==
=== Nijinsky branch ===
- Nijinsky (1970 English Triple Crown (2000 Guineas, Epsom Derby & St Leger), Irish Derby, King George):
  - Green Dancer (1975 Poulains):
    - Aryenne (1980 Pouliches)
    - No Attention:
      - Super Creek (1988 Kikuka Sho)
    - Cadoudal:
      - Indian River:
        - Native River (2018 Cheltenham Gold Cup)
      - Long Run (2011 Cheltenham Gold Cup)
      - Buck's Boum:
        - Al Boum Photo (2019-2020 Cheltenham Gold Cup)
    - Suave Dancer (1991 Prix du Jockey Club, Irish Champion, Arc de Triomphe):
      - Compton Admiral (1999 Eclipse)
      - Volvoreta (2000 Prix Vermeille)
    - Green Tune (1994 Poulains)
    - Eishin Preston (2003-4 QEII Cup)
  - Dancing Champ:
    - Dancing Duel (1993 Durban July)
    - Space Walk (1994 Durban July)
  - Copper Kingdom:
    - My Brilliant Star (1992 Australian Oaks)
  - Whiskey Road:
    - Just A Dash (1981 Melbourne Cup)
    - Strawberry Road (1983 Rosehill Guineas, Australian Derby, Cox Plate)
      - Fraise (1992 Breeders' Cup Turf)
      - Ajina (1997 CCAO, Breeders' Cup Distaff)
      - Escena (1998 Breeders' Cup Distaff)
  - Maruzensky:
    - Horisky (1982 Kikuka Sho)
    - Suzuka Koban (1985 Takarazuka Kinen)
    - Sakura Chiyono O (1988 Tokyo Yushun)
    - Leo Durban (1991 Kikuka Sho)
  - Yamaninsky:
    - Yaeno Muteki (1988 Satsuki Sho)
    - Light Color (1989 Yushun Himba)
  - Ile de Bourbon (1978 King George):
    - Lagunas (1984 Deutsches Derby)
    - Kahyasi (1988 Epsom and Irish Derby):
      - Enzeli (1999 Ascot Gold Cup)
      - Vereva (1997 Prix de Diane)
      - Zainta (1998 Prix de Diane)
    - Ile de Chypre (1989 International Stakes)
  - Yeats (b. 1976):
    - Poetic Prince (1988 Cox Plate, 1989 Queen Elizabeth (AUS))
  - Niniski:
    - Petoski (1985 King George)
    - Kala Dancer:
      - Subzero (1992 Melbourne Cup)
    - Minster Son (1988 St Leger)
    - Lomitas:
      - Belenus (1999 Deutsches Derby)
      - Silvano (2001 QEII Cup):
        - Bold Silvano (2010 Durban July)
        - Heavy Metal (2013 Durban July)
        - Lucky Speed (2013 Deutsches Derby)
        - Vercingetorix (2014 Jebel Hatta)
        - Power King (2015 Durban July)
        - Marinaresco (2017 Durban July)
        - Sparkling Water (2022 Durban July)
      - Danedream (2011 Arc de Triomphe, 2012 King George)
    - Hernando (1993 Prix du Jockey Club):
      - Holding Court (2000 Prix du Jockey Club)
      - Sulamani (2002 Prix du Jockey Club, International, 2003 Dubai Sheema Classic)
        - Mastery (2009 St Leger)
      - Look Here (2008 Epsom Oaks)
  - Czaravich (1980 Met Mile)
  - Kings Lake (1981 Irish 2000, Sussex, Irish Champion)
  - Sportin' Life:
    - Bet Twice (1987 Belmont Stakes)
  - Golden Fleece (1982 Epsom Derby)
  - Solford (1983 Eclipse)
  - Russian Roubles:
    - Isono Roubles (1991 Yushun Himba)
  - Serheed:
    - Northerly (2001-2 Cox Plate)
  - Caerleon (1983 Prix du Jockey Club, International):
    - Caerlina (1991 Prix de Diane)
    - Generous (1991 Epsom and Irish Derby, King George)
    - Moonax (1994 St Leger)
    - Overbury (1996 QEII Cup)
    - Lady Carla (1996 Epsom Oaks)
    - Fusaichi Concorde (1996 Tokyo Yushun)
    - Cape Verdi (1998 1000 Guineas)
    - Marienbard (2002 Arc de Triomphe)
  - Shadeed (1985 2000 Guineas, Queen Elizabeth II):
    - Shadayid (1991 1000 Guineas)
    - Alydeed (1992 Queen's Plate)
    - Sayyedati (1993 1000 Guineas, Sussex, Prix Jacques le Marois)
  - Manzotti:
    - Two Altazano (1994 CCAO)
  - Shahrastani (1986 Epsom and Irish Derby)
  - Ferdinand (1986 Kentucky Derby, 1987 Breeders' Cup Classic)
  - Royal Academy (1990 Breeders' Cup Mile):
    - Ihtiram:
      - Miss Andretti (2007 Lightning)
    - Ali-Royal (1997 Sussex)
    - Sleepytime (1997 1000 Guineas)
    - Zalaiyka (1998 Pouliches)
    - Val Royal (2001 Breeders' Cup Mile):
      - Cockney Rebel (2007 2000 Guineas, Irish 2000)
    - Bel Esprit:
      - Black Caviar (2011-3 Lightning)
    - Bullish Luck (2005-6 Champions Mile)
    - Eyeofthetiger (2006 Durban July)
  - Lammtarra (1995 Epsom Derby, King George, Arc de Triomphe)

=== Lyphard branch ===
- Lyphard (1972 Prix Jacques le Marois):
  - Pharly:
    - Le Nain Jaune:
      - Magic Night (1991 Prix Vermeille)
  - Reine de Saba (1978 Prix de Diane)
  - Dancing Maid (1978 Pouliches, Prix Vermeille)
  - Three Troikas (1979 Pouliches, Prix Vermeille, Arc de Triomphe)
  - Lypheor:
    - Royal Heroine (1984 Breeders' Cup Mile)
    - Tolomeo:
      - Innocent King (1993 Rosehill Guineas, Australian Derby)
    - Nippo Teio (1987 Tenno Sho (Autumn), Mile Championship):
      - Haru Urara
  - Mogami:
    - Sirius Symboli (1985 Tokyo Yushun)
    - Mejiro Ramonu (1986 Yushun Himba)
    - Legacy World (1993 Japan Cup)
  - Manila (1986 Breeders' Cup Turf)
  - Alzao:
    - Second Set (1991 Sussex)
    - Wind in Her Hair (1995 Aral-Pokal, dam of Deep Impact)
    - Matiya (1996 Irish 1000)
    - Winona (1998 Irish Oaks)
    - Alborada (1998-9 Champion Stakes)
    - Shahtoush (1998 Epsom Oaks)
  - Elliodor:
    - Super Quality (1997 Durban July)
  - Bellypha:
    - Silvermine (1985 Pouliches)
    - Mendez:
      - Linamix (1990 Poulains):
        - Miss Satamixa (1995 Prix Jacques le Marois)
        - Sagamix (1998 Prix de l'Arc de Triomphe)
        - Vahorimix (2001 Poulains, Prix Jacques le Marois)
        - Rajsaman:
          - Brametot (2017 Poulains, Prix du Jockey Club)
  - Dancing Brave (1986 2000 Guineas, Eclipse, King George, Arc de Triomphe):
    - Wemyss Bight (1993 Irish Oaks)
    - White Muzzle (1993 Derby Italiano)
      - Ingrandire (2004 Tenno Sho (Spring))
      - Smile Tomorrow (2002 Yushun Himba)
      - Asakusa Kings (2007 Kikuka Sho)
    - Erimo Chic (1997 Queen Elizabeth II Commemorative Cup)
    - King Halo (2000 Takamatsunomiya Kinen):
      - Kawakami Princess (2006 Yushun Himba, Shuka Sho)
      - Laurel Guerreiro (2009 Takamatsunomiya Kinen, Sprinters Stakes)
    - Commander in Chief (1993 Epsom and Irish Derby)
    - Kyoei March (1997 Oka Sho)
    - T M Ocean (2001 Oka Sho)
  - Ensconse (1989 Irish 1000)
  - Jolypha (1992 Prix de Diane, Prix Vermeille)
  - Pearl Bracelet (1989 Pouliches)

=== Nureyev branch ===
- Nureyev:
  - Sonic Lady (1986 Irish 1000, Sussex)
  - Theatrical (1987 International, Breeders' Cup Turf)
    - Madeleine's Dream (1993 Pouliches)
    - Zagreb (1996 Irish Derby)
    - Media Puzzle (2002 Melbourne Cup)
    - Mrs Lindsay (2007 Prix Vermeille)
  - Miesque (1987 1000 Guineas, Pouliches, 1987-8 Prix Jacques le Marois and Breeders' Cup Mile)
  - Soviet Star (1987 Poulains, Sussex):
    - Ashkalani (1996 Poulains))
    - Starcraft (2004 Australian Derby, 2005 Queen Elizabeth II)
  - Fotitieng:
    - Wonder Perfume (1995 Oka Sho)
  - Zilzal (1989 Sussex, Queen Elizabeth II):
    - Always Loyal (1997 Pouliches)
    - Among Men (1998 Sussex)
    - Faithful Son (1998 Prince of Wales)
  - Robin des Bois:
    - Gentlemen (1997 Pacific Classic)
  - Polar Falcon:
    - Pivotal:
      - Captain Rio:
        - Terravista (2017 Lightning)
      - Saoire (2005 Irish 1000)
      - Falco (2008 Poulains)
      - Halfway to Heaven (2008 Irish 1000)
      - Sariska (2009 Irish Oaks)
      - Buzzword (2010 Deutsches Derby)
      - Immortal Verse (2011 Prix Jacques le Marois)
      - Farhh (2013 Champion Stakes)
        - King of Change (2019 Queen Elizabeth II)
      - African Story (2014 Dubai World Cup)
      - Sariska (2009 Epsom Oaks)
      - Siyouni:
        - Ervedya (2015 Pouliches)
        - Laurens (2018 Prix de Diane)
        - Sottsass (2019 Prix du Jockey Club, 2020 Arc de Triomphe)
        - Dream And Do (2020 Pouliches)
        - St Mark's Basilica (2021 Poulains, Prix du Jockey Club, Eclipse, Irish Champion)
        - Paddington (2023 Irish 2000, Eclipse)
      - Lightning Spear (2018 Sussex)
      - Addeybb (2020 Champion Stakes, 2020-1 Queen Elizabeth (AUS))
      - Tahiyra (2023 Irish 1000)
  - Caesour:
    - Irridescence (2006 QEII Cup)
  - Rudimentary:
    - Industrialist (2000 QEII Cup)
  - Unusual Heat:
    - Acclamation (2011 Pacific Classic)
  - Mehthaaf (1994 Irish 1000)
  - Spinning World (1996 Irish 2000, 1996-7 Prix Jacques le Marois, 1997 Breeders' Cup Mile):
    - Thorn Park:
      - Jimmy Choux (2011 Rosehill Guineas)
      - Ocean Park (2012 Cox Plate)
    - Heavenly Glow (2008 Australian Oaks)
  - Wolfhound:
    - Bright Sky (2002 Prix de Diane)
  - Peintre Celebre (1997 Prix du Jockey Club, Arc de Triomphe):
    - Dai Jin (2003 Deutsches Derby)
    - Pride (2006 Champion Stakes)
    - Byword (2010 Prince of Wales)
  - Reams of Verse (1997 Epsom Oaks)
  - Stravinsky:
    - Serenade Rose (2006 Australian Oaks)
  - Skimming (2000-2001 Pacific Classic)

=== Danzig branch ===
- Danzig:
  - Chief's Crown:
    - Erhaab (1994 Epsom Derby)
    - Key of Luck:
      - Alamshar (2003 Irish Derby, King George)
    - Concerto:
      - Bellamy Road:
        - Diversify (2018 Whitney Stakes)
    - Chief Bearhart (1997 Breeders' Cup Turf)
    - Grand Lodge:
      - Sinndar (2000 Epsom and Irish Derby, Arc de Triomphe):
        - Shawanda (2005 Irish Oaks, Prix Vermeille)
        - Shareta (2012 Prix Vermeille)
      - Shogun Lodge (2001 Queen Elizabeth (AUS))
      - Grandera (2002 Irish Champion, Prince of Wales)
      - Hotel Grand (2006 Randwick Guineas)
  - Danzig Connection (1986 Belmont Stakes)
  - Green Desert:
    - Desert Sun:
      - Sunline (1999-2000 Cox Plate)
    - Desert Style:
      - Bachir (2000 Poulains, Irish 2000)
      - Next Desert (2002 Deutsches Derby)
      - Mandesha (2006 Prix Vermeille)
      - Paco Boy:
        - Galileo Gold (2016 2000 Guineas)
    - Oriental Express (1998 QEII Cup)
    - Cape Cross:
      - Ouija Board (2004 Epsom and Irish Oaks, 2006 Prince of Wales)
      - Able One (2007 & 2010 Champions Mile)
      - Sea the Stars (2009 2000 Guineas, Epsom Derby, Eclipse, International, Irish Champion, Arc de Triomphe):
        - Taghrooda (2014 Epsom Oaks, King George)
        - Sea the Moon (2014 Deutsches Derby)
        - Harzand (2016 Epsom and Irish Derby)
        - Stradivarius (2018, 2019, 2020 Ascot Gold Cup)
        - Sea of Class (2018 Irish Oaks)
        - Crystal Ocean (2019 Prince of Wales)
        - Star Catcher (2019 Irish Oaks, Prix Vermeille)
        - Baaeed (2021 Queen Elizabeth II, 2022 Sussex, International)
        - Teona (2021 Prix Vermeille)
        - Hukum (2022 Coronation Cup, King George VI & Queen Elizabeth Stakes)
        - Daryz (2025 Prix de l'Arc de Triomphe)
      - Golden Horn (2015 Epsom Derby, Irish Champion, Eclipse, Arc de Triomphe)
      - Awtaad (2016 Irish 2000)
    - Desert Prince (1998 Irish 2000, Queen Elizabeth II)
    - Invincible Spirit:
      - Lawman (2007 Prix du Jockey Club)
        - Just The Judge (2013 Irish 1000)
      - I Am Invincible:
        - Home Affairs (2022 Lightning)
      - Charm Spirit (2014 Queen Elizabeth II)
      - Moonlight Cloud (2013 Prix Jacques le Marois)
      - Kingman (2014 Irish 2000, Sussex, Prix Jacques le Marois)
        - Persian King (2019 Prix d'Essai des Poulains)
        - Palace Pier (2020 & 2021 Prix Jacques Le Marois)
      - Harbour Law (2016 St Leger)
      - Magna Grecia (2019 2000 Guineas)
    - Rose Gypsy (2001 Pouliches)
    - Oasis Dream:
      - Midday (2010 Prix Vermeille)
      - Power (2012 Irish 2000)
      - Showcasing:
        - Mohaather (2020 Sussex)
      - Native Trail (2022 Irish 2000)
  - Polish Navy:
    - Sea Hero (1993 Kentucky Derby)
  - Allied Flag:
    - Classic Flag (1998 Durban July)
  - Polish Precedent (1989 Prix Jacques le Marois):
    - Pure Grain (1995 Irish Oaks)
    - Pilsudski (1996 Breeders' Cup Turf, 1997 Eclipse, Champion, Irish Champion, Japan Cup)
    - Rakti (2003 Champion Stakes, 2004 Prince of Wales, Queen Elizabeth II)
    - Polish Summer (2004 Dubai Sheema Classic)
    - Court Masterpiece (2006 Sussex)
    - Darsi (2006 Prix du Jockey Club)
  - Danehill:
    - Danasinga:
      - Metal Bender (2009 Randwick Guineas, Rosehill Guineas)
    - Danzero:
      - Fairway (2000 Randwick Guineas, Australian Derby)
      - Jymcarew (2005 Randwick Guineas)
    - Danewin (1995 Rosehill Guineas)
    - Dane Ripper (1997 Cox Plate)
    - Danendri (1997 Australian Oaks)
    - Fine Motion (2002 Shuka Sho, 2002 Queen Elizabeth II Commemorative Cup)
    - Desert King (1997 Irish 2000, Irish Derby):
      - Makybe Diva (2003-5 Melbourne Cup, 2005 Cox Plate)
      - Mr Dinos (2003 Ascot Gold Cup)
      - Speciosa (2006 1000 Guineas)
      - Desert War (2007 Queen Elizabeth (AUS))
      - Legatissimo (2015 1000 Guineas)
    - Flying Spur:
      - Mentality (2007 Randwick Guineas)
      - Dealer Principal (2008 Rosehill Guineas)
      - Inspiration (2008 Hong Kong Sprint)
    - Arena (1999 Randwick Guineas):
      - Rena's Lady (2007 Australian Oaks)
    - Camacho:
      - Teppal (2018 Pouliches)
    - Fairy King Prawn (1999 Hong Kong Sprint)
    - Tiger Hill:
      - Rewilding (2011 Dubai Sheema Classic, Prince of Wales)
    - Redoute's Choice:
      - Not a Single Doubt:
        - Southern Legend (2020 Champions Mile)
      - Stratum:
        - Streama (2012 Australian Oaks)
      - Time Thief:
        - In Her Time (2019 Lightning)
      - Snitzel:
        - Shamus Award (2013 Cox Plate)
          - El Patroness (2022 Australian Oaks)
        - Snitzerland (2014 Lightning)
      - Absolutely (2011 Australian Oaks)
      - Royal Descent (2013 Australian Oaks)
      - Lankan Rupee (2015 Lightning)
      - The Autumn Sun (2019 Randwick Guineas, Rosehill Guineas)
    - Danehill Dancer:
      - Where or When (2002 Queen Elizabeth II)
      - Choisir (2003 Lightning)
        - Starspangledbanner:
          - The Wow Signal:
            - Couersamba (2021 Pouliches)
          - State Of Rest (2021 Cox Plate, 2022 Prince of Wales's)
        - Olympic Glory (2013 Queen Elizabeth II)
      - Fast Company:
        - Jet Setting (2016 Irish 1000)
      - Dancing Rain (2011 Epsom Oaks)
      - Mastercraftsman (2009 Irish 2000):
        - The Grey Gatsby (2014 Prix du Jockey Club, Irish Champion)
        - Kingston Hill (2014 St Leger)
        - Alpha Centauri (2018 Irish 1000, Prix Jacques Le Marois)
      - Esoterique (2015 Prix Jacques le Marois)
      - Here Comes When (2017 Sussex)
    - Dansili:
      - Rail Link (2006 Prix de l'Arc de Triomphe)
      - Harbinger (2010 King George)
        - Deirdre (2017 Shuka Sho)
        - Mozu Katchan (2017 Queen Elizabeth II Cup)
        - Blast Onepiece (2018 Arima Kinen)
      - The Fugue (2013 Irish Champion, 2014 Prince of Wales)
      - Miss France (2014 1000 Guineas)
      - Zoffany:
        - Mother Earth (2021 1000 Guineas)
    - Aquarelliste (2001 Prix de Diane, Prix Vermeille)
    - Mozart:
      - Dandy Man:
        - Peniaphobia (2016 Hong Kong Sprint)
    - Landseer (2002 Poulains)
    - Rock of Gibraltar (2002 2000 Guineas, Irish 2000, Sussex):
      - Mount Nelson (2008 Eclipse)
      - Samitar (2012 Irish 1000)
    - Banks Hill (2002 Prix Jacques le Marois)
    - Jeune King Prawn (2002 Champions Mile)
    - Exceed and Excel:
      - Helmet:
        - Thunder Snow (2018-9 Dubai World Cup)
      - Excelebration (2012 Queen Elizabeth II, Prix Jacques le Marois)
      - Mr Stunning (2017-2018 Hong Kong Sprint)
      - Mawj (2023 1000 Guineas)
    - Clodovil (2003 Poulains)
    - Westerner (2005 Ascot Gold Cup)
    - Aussie Rules (2006 Poulains)
    - Darci Brahma:
      - Gust of Wind (2005 Australian Oaks)
    - Fastnet Rock (2005 Lightning)
      - Hinchinbrook:
        - Beat the Cloack (2019 Hong Kong Sprint)
      - Mosheen (2012 Randwick Guineas)
      - Qualify (2015 Epsom Oaks)
      - Fascinating Rock (2015 Champion Stakes)
      - Unforgotten (2018 Australian Oaks)
    - North Light (2004 Epsom Derby):
      - Arctic Cosmos (2010 St Leger)
    - Oratorio (2005 Eclipse, Irish Champion)
      - Military Attack (2013 QEII Cup)
    - George Washington (2006 2000 Guineas, Queen Elizabeth II)
    - Champs Elysees:
      - Trip to Paris (2015 Ascot Gold Cup)
      - Billesdon Brook (2018 1000 Guineas)
    - Dylan Thomas (2007 Irish Derby, King George, Arc de Triomphe, 2007-8 Irish Champion)
      - Blazing Speed (2015 QEII Cup)
    - Peeping Fawn (2007 Irish Oaks)
    - Holy Roman Emperor:
      - Homecoming Queen (2012 1000 Guineas)
      - Designs on Rome (2014 QEII Cup)
      - Mongolian Khan (2015 Australian Derby)
      - Romanised (2018 Irish 2000, 2019 Prix Jacques le Marois)
    - Duke of Marmalade (2008 Prince of Wales, King George, International):
      - Star of Seville (2015 Prix de Diane)
      - Simple Verse (2015 St Leger)
      - Nutan (2015 Deutsches Derby)
      - Big Orange (2017 Ascot Gold Cup)
  - Shaadi (1989 Irish 2000)
  - Honor Grades:
    - Adoration (2003 Breeders' Cup Distaff)
  - Langfuhr (1997 Met Mile):
    - Wando (2003 Queen's Plate)
    - Lawyer Ron (2007 Whitney)
  - Dance Smartly (1991 Breeders' Cup Distaff, Queen's Plate)
  - Pine Bluff (1992 Preakness Stakes)
  - Lure (1992-3 Breeders' Cup Mile)
    - Orpen:
      - Torrestrella (2004 Pouliches)
  - Dispute (1993 Kentucky Oaks)
  - Maroof (1994 Queen Elizabeth II)
    - Figures (2004 Champions Mile)
    - Natural Blitz (2005 Hong Kong Sprint)
  - Boundary:
    - Big Brown (2007 Kentucky Derby, Preakness Stakes)
  - Perugino:
    - Testa Rossa (2000 Lightning)
  - Anabaa:
    - Anabaa Blue (2001 Prix du Jockey Club)
    - Headturner (2006 Australian Derby)
    - Goldikova (2008-2010 Breeders' Cup Mile, 2009 Prix Jacques le Marois)
    - Style Vendome (2013 Poulains)
  - Bianconi:
    - Nicconi (2009 Lightning)
      - Nature Strip (2021 Lightning)
  - Mull of Kintyre:
    - Araafa (2006 Irish 2000)
  - War Chant (2000 Breeders' Cup Mile)
  - War Front:
    - Declaration of War (2013 International Stakes)
      - Olmedo (2018 Poule d'Essai des Poulains)
      - Vow And Declare (2019 Melbourne Cup)
    - War of Will (2019 Preakness)
  - Librettist (2006 Prix Jacques le Marois)
  - Hard Spun:
    - Questing (2012 CCAO)
    - Le Romain (2016 Randwick Guineas)
    - Silver State (2021 Met Mile)
  - Astronomer Royal (2007 Poulains)

=== Storm Bird branch ===
- Storm Bird:
  - Storm Cat:
    - Harlan:
      - Harlan's Holiday:
        - Majesticperfection:
          - Lovely Maria (2015 Kentucky Oaks)
        - Into Mischief:
          - Authentic (2020 Kentucky Derby, Breeders' Cup Classic)
          - Life Is Good (2022 Whitney)
          - Sovereignty (2025 Kentucky Derby and Belmont Stakes)
    - Tabasco Cat (1994 Preakness and Belmont Stakes)
    - Forest Wildcat:
      - Var:
        - Variety Club (2014 Champions Mile)
    - Sardula (1994 Kentucky Oaks)
    - Hennessy:
      - Johannesburg:
        - Scat Daddy:
          - No Nay Never:
            - Alcohol Free (2021 Sussex)
          - Justify (2018 Kentucky Derby, Preakness, Belmont)
        - Once Were Wild (2010 Australian Oaks)
      - Wiseman's Ferry:
        - Wise Dan (2012-3 Breeders' Cup Mile)
      - Henny Hughes:
        - Beholder (2013, 2016 Breeders' Cup Distaff, 2015 Pacific Classic)
      - Grand Armee (2004-5 Queen Elizabeth (AUS))
      - Special Duty (2010 1000 Guineas, Pouliches)
      - Inglorious (2011 Queen's Plate)
    - Tale of the Cat:
      - Lion Heart:
        - Dangerous Midge (2010 Breeders' Cup Turf)
      - Gio Ponti:
        - Drefong:
          - Geoglyph (2022 Satsuki Sho)
        - Sir Dudley Digges (2016 Queen's Plate)
      - Stopchargingmaria (2014 CCAO, 2015 Breeders' Cup Distaff)
    - Forestry:
      - Shackleford (2011 Preakness Stakes, 2012 Met Mile)
    - Cat Thief (1999 Breeders' Cup Classic)
    - Aljabr (1999 Sussex)
    - Bernstein:
      - Karakontie (2014 Poulains, Breeders' Cup Mile)
      - Tepin (2015 Breeders' Cup Mile)
    - Giant's Causeway (2000 Eclipse, Sussex, International, Irish Champion):
      - Footstepsinthesand (2005 2000 Guineas)
      - Shamardal (2005 Poulains, Prix du Jockey Club)
        - Lope de Vega (2010 Poulains, Prix du Jockey Club)
          - Phoenix of Spain (2019 Irish 2000)
          - Gytrash (2020 Lightning)
          - Sweet Lady (2022 Prix Vermeille)
        - Dan Excel (2013 Champions Mile)
        - Mukhadram (2014 Eclipse)
        - Baltic Baroness (2014 Prix Vermeille)
        - Able Friend (2015 Champions Mile)
        - Pakistan Star (2018 QEII Cup)
        - Victor Ludorum (2020 Poulains)
        - Tarnawa (2020 Prix Vermeille, Breeders' Cup Turf)
      - Mike Fox (2007 Queen's Plate)
      - Ghanaati (2009 1000 Guineas)
      - Rite of Passage (2010 Ascot Gold Cup)
      - Protonico:
        - Medina Spirit (2021 Kentucky Derby)
      - Eskendereya:
        - Mor Spirit (2017 Met Mile)
        - Mitole (2019 Met Mile)
      - Not This Time:
        - Sibelius (2023 Dubai Golden Shaheen)
        - Epicenter (2022 Travers Stakes)
        - Magnitude (2026 Dubai World Cup)
      - Bricks and Mortar (2019 Breeders' Cup Turf)
    - Black Minnaloushe (2001 Irish 2000)
    - Pure Prize:
      - Blue Prize (2019 Breeders' Cup Distaff)
    - Life is Sweet (2009 Breeders' Cup Distaff)
  - Indian Skimmer (1987 Prix de Diane, Champion, Irish Champion)
  - Prince of Birds (1988 Irish 2000)
  - Bluebird:
    - Dolphin Street:
      - Spinning Hill (2002 Lightning)
  - Summer Squall (1990 Preakness Stakes):
    - Charismatic (1999 Kentucky Derby, Preakness)
    - Summerly (2005 Kentucky Oaks)
  - Balanchine (1994 English Oaks and Irish Derby)

=== Sadler's Wells branch ===
- Sadler's Wells (1984 Irish 2000, Eclipse, Irish Champion):
  - Old Vic (1989 Prix du Jockey Club and Irish Derby)
    - Kicking King (2005 Cheltenham Gold Cup)
  - Scenic:
    - Universal Prince (2001 Randwick Guineas, Australian Derby)
    - Viewed (2008 Melbourne Cup)
    - Scenic Blast (2008 Lightning)
  - Fort Wood:
    - Dynasty (2003 Durban July)
      - Legislate (2014 Durban July)
      - Belgarion (2020 Durban July)
    - Elusive Fort:
      - Kommetdieding (2021 Durban July)
    - Hunting Tower (2007 Durban July)
  - In the Wings (1990 Breeders' Cup Turf):
    - Winged Love (1995 Irish Derby)
    - Singspiel (1996 Japan Cup, 1997 Dubai World Cup, International):
      - Moon Ballad (2003 Dubai World Cup)
      - Papineau (2004 Ascot Gold Cup)
      - Lohengrin:
        - Logo Type (2013 Satsuki Sho)
      - Confidential Lady (2006 Prix de Diane)
      - Eastern Anthem (2009 Dubai Sheema Classic)
      - Dar Re Mi (2010 Dubai Sheema Classic)
      - Solow (2015 Sussex, Queen Elizabeth II)
    - Act One:
      - Dancer's Daughter (2008 Durban July)
    - Casey Tibbs:
      - Big City Life (2009 Durban July)
    - Soldier Hollow:
      - Pastorius (2012 Deutsches Derby)
      - Welstar (2018 Deutsches Derby)
    - Adlerflug (2007 Deutsches Derby)
      - In Swoop (2020 Deutsches Derby)
      - Torquator Tasso (2021 Prix de l'Arc de Triomphe)
  - Batshoof (1990 Prince of Wales)
  - Salsabil (1990 1000 Guineas, Epsom Oaks, Irish Derby, Prix Vermeille)
  - Stagecraft (1991 Prince of Wales)
  - Opera House (1993 Eclipse, King George):
    - T M Opera O (1999 Satsuki Sho, 2000 Tenno Sho (Spring & Autumn), Takarazuka Kinen, Arima Kinen, Japan Cup, 2001 Tenno Sho (Spring))
    - Meisho Samson (2006 Satsuki Sho, Tokyo Yushun)
  - Saddlers' Hall:
    - Silver Patriarch (1997 St Leger)
  - Intrepidity (1993 Epsom Oaks, Prix Vermeille)
  - Kayf Tara (1998 & 2000 Ascot Gold Cup)
  - Kings Theatre (1994 King George)
  - Barathea (1993 Irish 2000, 1994 Breeders' Cup Mile)
  - Northern Spur (1995 Breeders' Cup Turf)
  - El Prado:
    - Medaglia d'Oro (2003 Whitney):
      - Rachel Alexandra (2009 Kentucky Oaks, Preakness Stakes)
      - Plum Pretty (2011 Kentucky Oaks)
      - Songbird (2016 CCAO)
      - Talismanic (2017 Breeders' Cup Turf)
      - Wonder Gadot (2018 Queen's Plate)
      - Higher Power (2019 Pacific Classic)
      - Golden Sixty (2021-2 Champions Mile)
    - Kitten's Joy:
      - Hawkbill (2016 Eclipse, 2018 Dubai Sheema Classic)
      - Roaring Lion (2018 Eclipse, International, Irish Champion, Queen Elizabeth II)
      - Kameko (2020 2000 Guineas)
      - Tripoli (2021 Pacific Classic)
    - Borrego (2005 Pacific Classic)
    - Artie Schiller (2005 Breeders' Cup Mile)
      - Laser Hawk (2012 Rosehill Guineas)
  - Carnegie (1994 Prix de l'Arc de Triomphe)
    - Carnegie Express (2002 Randwick Guineas, Rosehill Guineas)
  - Moonshell (1995 Epsom Oaks)
  - Dance Design (1996 Irish Oaks)
  - Entrepreneur (horse) (1997 2000 Guineas)
    - Vintage Tipple (2003 Irish Oaks)
  - Ebadiyla (1997 Irish Oaks)
  - Beat Hollow:
    - Minella Indo (2021 Cheltenham Gold Cup)
  - Oscar:
    - Lord Windermere (2014 Cheltenham Gold Cup)
  - Dream Well (1998 Prix du Jockey Club and Irish Derby)
  - King of Kings (1998 2000 Guineas)
  - Leggera (1998 Prix Vermeille)
  - Montjeu (1999 Prix du Jockey Club, Irish Derby, King George, Arc de Triomphe):
    - Motivator (2005 Epsom Derby):
      - Treve (2013 Prix de Diane, 2013 & 2015 Prix Vermeille, 2013-4 Arc de Triomphe)
    - Scorpion (2005 Saint Leger)
    - Hurricane Run (2005 Irish Derby and Arc de Triomphe)
    - Authorized (2007 Epsom Derby, International)
      - The Revenant (2020 Queen Elizabeth II)
      - Santiago (2020 Irish Derby)
    - Tavistock:
      - Volkstok'n'barrell (2015 Rosehill Guineas)
      - Tarzino (2016 Rosehill Guineas)
      - Tavago (2016 Australian Derby)
      - Werther (2016 QEII Cup)
    - Frozen Fire (2008 Irish Derby)
    - Nom du Jeu (2008 Australian Derby)
    - Fame and Glory (2009 Irish Derby, 2011 Ascot Gold Cup)
    - Roman Emperor (2009 Australian Derby)
    - Pour Moi (2011 Epsom Derby)
      - Wings of Eagles (2017 Epsom Derby)
    - Masked Marvel (2011 St Leger)
    - St Nicholas Abbey (2011 Breeders' Cup Turf, 2013 Dubai Sheema Classic)
    - Green Moon (2012 Melbourne Cup)
    - Camelot (2012 2000 Guineas, Epsom and Irish Derby)
      - Latrobe (2018 Irish Derby)
      - Even So (2020 Irish Oaks)
      - Sir Dragonet (2020 Cox Plate)
      - Luxembourg (2022 Irish Champion)
      - Sammarco (2022 Deutsches Derby)
    - Chicquita (2013 Irish Oaks)
    - Leading Light (2013 St Leger, 2014 Ascot Gold Cup)
    - Bracelet (2014 Irish Oaks)
  - Saffron Walden (1999 Irish 2000)
  - Imagine (2001 Irish 1000, Epsom Oaks)
  - Galileo (2001 Epsom and Irish Derby, King George):
    - Nightime (2006 Irish 1000)
    - Sixties Icon (2006 St Leger)
    - Red Rocks (2006 Breeders' Cup Turf)
    - Teofilo:
      - Trading Leather (2013 Irish Derby)
      - Pleascach (2014 Irish 1000)
      - Cross Counter (2018 Melbourne Cup)
      - Exultant (2020 QEII Cup)
      - Twilight Payment (2020 Melbourne Cup)
      - Subjectivist (2021 Ascot Gold Cup)
    - Soldier of Fortune (2007 Irish Derby)
    - New Approach (2008 Epsom Derby, Champion, Irish Champion):
      - Talent (2013 Epsom Oaks)
      - Dawn Approach (2013 2000 Guineas)
        - Poetic Flare (2021 2000 Guineas)
      - Masar (2018 Epsom Derby)
      - Mac Swiney (2021 Irish 2000)
    - Rip Van Winkle (2009 Sussex, Queen Elizabeth II, 2010 International)
    - Cape Blanco (2010 Irish Derby, Irish Champion)
    - Frankel (2011 2000 Guineas, Queen Elizabeth II, 2011-2 Sussex, 2012 International, Champion)
      - Soul Stirring (2017 Yushun Himba)
      - Cracksman (2017-2018 Champion)
        - Ace Impact (2023 Prix du Jockey Club, 2023 Prix de l'Arc de Triomphe)
      - Anapurna (2019 Epsom Oaks)
      - Logician (2019 St Leger)
      - Adayar (2021 Epsom Derby, King George)
      - Hungry Heart (2021 Australian Oaks)
      - Hurricane Lane (2021 Irish Derby, St Leger)
      - Alpinista (2022 Prix de l'Arc de Triomphe)
      - Converge (2022 Randwick Guineas)
      - Homeless Songs (2022 Irish 1000)
      - Inspiral (2022 Prix Jacques Le Marois)
      - Nashwa (2022 Diane)
      - Westover (2022 Irish Derby)
      - Chaldean (2023 2000 Guineas)
      - Soul Sister (2023 Epsom Oaks)
      - Mostahdaf (2023 Prince of Wales)
    - Nathaniel (2011 Eclipse, King George)
      - Enable (2017 Epsom & Irish Oaks, 2017, 2019 & 2020 King George, 2017-2018 Arc de Triomphe, 2018 Breeders' Cup Turf, 2019 Eclipse)
      - Channel (2019 Prix de Diane)
      - Desert Crown (2022 Epsom Derby)
    - Golden Lilac (2011 Prix de Diane)
    - Igugu (2011 Durban July)
    - Treasure Beach (2011 Irish Derby)
    - Galikova (2011 Prix Vermeille)
    - Misty for Me (2011 Irish 1000)
    - Roderic O'Connor (2011 Irish 2000)
    - Was (2012 Epsom Oaks)
    - Great Heavens (2012 Irish Oaks)
    - Intello (2013 Prix du Jockey Club)
    - Ruler of the World (2013 Epsom Derby)
    - Magician (2013 Irish 2000, Breeders' Cup Turf)
    - Australia (2014 Epsom and Irish Derby, International)
      - Galileo Chrome (2020 St Leger)
      - Order of Australia (2020 Breeders' Cup Mile)
    - Adelaide (2014 Cox Plate)
    - Galiway:
      - Sealiway (2021 Champion Stakes)
    - Marvellous (2014 Irish 1000)
    - Noble Mission (2015 Champion Stakes)
    - Gleneagles (2015 2000 Guineas, Irish 2000)
      - Calandagan (2025 King George, Champion Stakes, Japan Cup, 2026 Dubai Sheema Classic)
    - Found (2015 Breeders' Cup Turf, 2016 Prix de l'Arc de Triomphe)
    - Highland Reel (2016 King George, Breeders' Cup Turf, 2017 Prince of Wales)
    - Order of St George (2016 Ascot Gold Cup)
    - Minding (2016 1000 Guineas, Epsom Oaks, Queen Elizabeth II)
    - Seventh Heaven (2016 Irish Oaks)
    - The Gurkha (2016 Poulains, Sussex)
    - Alice Springs (2016 Falmouth Stakes, Matron Stakes, Sun Chariot Stakes)
    - Decorated Knight (2017 Irish Champion)
    - Churchill (2017 2000 Guineas, Irish 2000)
      - Vadeni (2022 Prix du Jockey Club, Eclipse)
      - Blue Rose Cen (2023 Prix de Diane)
    - Winter (2017 1000 Guineas, Irish 1000)
    - Capri (2017 Irish Derby, St Leger)
    - Ulysses (2017 Eclipse, International)
    - Forever Together (2018 Epsom Oaks)
    - Kew Gardens (2018 St Leger)
    - Magical (2019-20 Irish Champion, 2019 Champion)
    - Waldgeist (2019 Arc de Triomphe)
    - Anthony Van Dyck (2019 Epsom Derby)
    - Hermosa (2019 1000 Guineas, Irish 1000)
    - Japan (2019 International Stakes)
    - Sovereign (2019 Irish Derby)
    - Love (2020 1000 Guineas, Epsom Oaks, 2021 Prince of Wales)
    - Peaceful (2020 Irish 1000)
    - Serpentine (2020 Epsom Derby)
    - Empress Josephine (2021 Irish 1000)
    - Joan of Arc (2021 Prix de Diane)
    - Tuesday (2022 Epsom Oaks)
    - Kyprios (2022 Ascot Gold Cup)
    - Magical Lagoon (2022 Irish Oaks)
  - Not Impossible:
    - Not Bourbon (2008 Queen's Plate)
  - Sligo Bay:
    - Lexie Lou (2014 Queen's Plate)
  - Milan (2001 St Leger)
  - Sholokhov:
    - Don Cossack (2016 Cheltenham Gold Cup)
  - Gossamer (2002 Irish 1000)
  - High Chaparral (2002 Epsom and Irish Derby, 2002-3 Breeders' Cup Turf, 2003 Irish Champion)
    - Shoot Out (2010 Randwick Guineas, Australian Derby)
    - So You Think (2009-10 Cox Plate, 2011 Eclipse, Irish Champion, 2012 Prince of Wales)
      - Inference (2017 Randwick Guineas)
      - D'Argento (2018 Rosehill Guineas)
      - Quick Thinker (2020 Australian Derby)
      - Think It Over (2022 Queen Elizabeth (AUS))
    - Contributer:
      - Lion's Roar (2021 Randwick Guineas)
    - It's A Dundeel, aka Dundeel (2013 Randwick Guineas, Rosehill Guineas, Australian Derby, 2014 Queen Elizabeth (AUS))
      - Castelvecchio (2020 Rosehill Guineas)
    - Toronado (2013 Sussex)
    - Free Eagle (2015 Prince of Wales)
    - Rekindling (2017 Melbourne Cup)
  - Brian Boru (2003 St Leger)
  - Refuse to Bend (2003 2000 Guineas, 2004 Eclipse):
    - Sarafina (2010 Prix de Diane)
  - Yesterday (2003 Irish 1000)
  - Poliglote:
    - Solemia (2012 Prix de l'Arc de Triomphe)
  - Doyen (2004 King George)
  - River Dancer (2004 QEII Cup)
  - Yeats (2006-2009 Ascot Gold Cup)
  - Alexandrova (2006 Epsom and Irish Oaks)
  - Synchronised (2012 Cheltenham Gold Cup)

=== Other branches ===
- Viceregal:
  - Esclavo:
    - Karloff (1990 Deutsches Derby)
- Nice Dancer:
  - Fiddle Dancer Boy (1981 Queen's Plate)
- Vice Regent:
  - Regal Embrace (1978 Queen's Plate)
  - Deputy Minister:
    - Silver Deputy:
      - Archers Bay (1998 Queen's Plate)
      - Silverbulletday (1999 Kentucky Oaks)
    - Open Mind (1989 Kentucky Oaks, CCAO)
    - Dehere:
      - Defier (2002 Queen Elizabeth (AUS))
    - French Deputy:
      - Left Bank (2002 Whitney)
      - Admire Jupiter (2008 Tenno Sho (Spring))
      - Eishin Deputy (2008 Takarazuka Kinen)
      - Kurofune:
        - Fusaichi Richard (2005 Asahi Hai Futurity Stakes)
        - Sleepless Night (2008 Sprinters Stakes)
        - Curren Chan (2011 Sprinters Stakes, 2012 Takamatsunomiya Kinen)
        - Whale Capture (2012 Victoria Mile)
        - Clarity Sky (2015 NHK Mile Cup)
        - Up to Date (2015 Nakayama Grand Jump, 2015 Nakayama Daishogai)
        - Aerolithe (2017 NHK Mile Cup)
        - Sodashi (2021 Oka Sho)
      - Reginetta (2008 Oka Sho)
    - Awesome Again (1997 Queen's Plate, 1998 Whitney, Breeders' Cup Classic):
      - Ghostzapper (2004 Breeders' Cup Classic, 2005 Met Mile):
        - Moreno (2014 Whitney)
        - Shaman Ghost (2015 Queen's Plate)
        - Holy Helena (2017 Queen's Plate)
        - Guarano (2019 CCAO)
        - Mystic Guide (2021 Dubai World Cup)
        - Moira (2022 Queen's Plate)
      - Round Pond (2006 Breeders' Cup Distaff)
      - Ginger Punch (2007 Breeders' Cup Distaff)
      - Paynter:
        - Knicks Go (2021 Whitney, Breeders' Cup Classic)
      - Game On Dude (2013 Pacific Classic)
      - Oxbow (2013 Preakness Stakes)
      - Sir Winston (2019 Belmont Stakes)
    - Touch Gold (1997 Belmont Stakes)
    - Keeper Hill (1998 Kentucky Oaks)
  - New Regent:
    - Savana City (1988 Australian Oaks)
  - Regal Intention (1988 Queen's Plate)
  - Regal Classic:
    - Regal Discovery (1995 Queen's Plate)
  - Tejabo:
    - T Js Lucky Moon (2002 Queen's Plate)
- Northfields:
  - North Stoke (1977 Irish Champion)
  - Oats:
    - Master Oats (1995 Cheltenham Gold Cup)
  - Northjet (1981 Prix Jacques le Marois)
  - No Pass No Sale (1985 Poulains)
- Northern Taste:
  - Amber Shadai (1981 Arima Kinen):
    - Mejiro Ryan (1991 Takarazuka Kinen):
      - Mejiro Dober (1997 Yushun Himba)
      - Mejiro Bright (1998 Tenno Sho (Spring))
  - Shadai Ivor (1982 Yushun Himba)
  - Dyna Carle (1983 Yushun Himba)
  - Shadai Sophia (1983 Oka Sho)
  - Dyna Gulliver (1986 Tokyo Yushun, Arima Kinen)
    - Fight Gulliver (1996 Oka Sho)
  - Adorable (1992 Yushun Himba)
- Far North:
  - Fast Topaze (1986 Poulains)
- Compliance:
  - Fourstars Allstar (1991 Irish 2000)
- Be My Guest:
  - Assert (1982 Prix du Jockey Club, Irish Derby, International, Irish Champion):
    - All My Dreams (1995 Deutsches Derby)
    - Zaffaran:
      - Looks Like Trouble (2000 Cheltenham Gold Cup)
  - On the House (1982 1000 Guineas, Sussex)
  - Luth Enchantee (1983 Prix Jacques le Marois)
  - Double Bed:
    - Jim and Tonic (1999 QEII Cup)
  - Go and Go (1990 Belmont Stakes)
  - Pentire (1995 Irish Champion, 1996 King George):
    - Prince of Penzance (2015 Melbourne Cup)
  - Valentine Waltz (1999 Pouliches)
- Try My Best:
  - Last Tycoon (1986 Breeders' Cup Mile)
    - Bigstone (1993 Sussex, Queen Elizabeth II):
      - Meisho Doto (2001 Takarazuka Kinen)
    - Marju:
      - My Emma (1996 Prix Vermeille)
      - Martino Alonso:
        - Ramonti (2007 Sussex, Queen Elizabeth II)
      - Soviet Song (2004 Sussex)
      - Viva Pataca (2007, 2010 QEII Cup)
      - Satono Crown (2017 Takarazuka Kinen)
        - Tastiera (2023 Japanese Derby)
    - Ezzoud (1993-4 International Stakes, 1994 Eclipse)
    - Mahogany (1994 Australian Derby, 1995 & 1997 Lightning)
    - O'Reilly:
      - Shamrocker (2011 Australian Derby)
    - Tycoon Lil (1998 Randwick Guineas)
  - Waajib:
    - Royal Applause:
      - Acclamation (GB):
        - Dark Angel:
          - Persuasive (2017 Queen Elizabeth II)
          - Mangoustine (2022 Pouliches)
        - Aclaim:
          - Cachet (2022 1000 Guineas)
        - Expert Eye (2018 Breeders Cup Mile)
        - Harbour Watch:
          - Pyledriver (2022 King George VI & Queen Elizabeth)
- Kolmsky:
  - Merry Nice (1987 Tokyo Yushun)
- The Minstrel (1977 Epsom and Irish Derby, King George):
  - L'Emigrant (1983 Poulains)
  - Palace Music (1984 Champion Stakes):
    - Naturalism (1992 Rosehill Guineas, Australian Derby)
    - Cigar (1995 Breeders' Cup Classic, 1996 Dubai World Cup)
  - Musical Bliss (1989 1000 Guineas)
  - Opening Verse (1991 Breeders' Cup Mile)
- Topsider:
  - Assatis (1989 Gran Premio del Jockey Club)
    - Wing Arrow (2000 February Stakes, Japan Cup Dirt)
    - Bonneville Record (2007 Teio Sho, 2008 Kashiwa Kinen)
  - Salse:
    - Classic Cliche (1995 St Leger, 1996 Ascot Gold Cup)
    - Air Express (1997 Queen Elizabeth II)
- White Star Line (1978 Kentucky Oaks)
- Sovereign Dancer:
  - Gate Dancer (1984 Preakness Stakes)
  - Priolo (1990 Prix Jacques le Marois)
    - Sendawar (1999 Poulains)
  - Louis Quatorze (1996 Preakness Stakes)
- Northern Baby (1979 Champion Stakes):
  - Michelozzo (1989 St Leger)
- Secreto (1984 Epsom Derby):
  - Mystiko (1991 2000 Guineas)
- Glenstal:
  - Las Meninas (1994 1000 Guineas)
- Night Shift:
  - In the Groove (1990 1000 Guineas, International, Champion Stakes)
  - Midnight Legend:
    - Sizing John (2017 Cheltenham Gold Cup)
  - Dyhim Diamond:
    - Turtle Bowl:
      - Lucayan (2012 Poulains)
  - Daryaba (1999 Prix de Diane, Prix Vermeille)
  - Azamour (2004 Prince of Wales, Irish Champion, 2005 King George):
    - Valyra (2012 Prix de Diane)
    - Covert Love (2015 Irish Oaks)
    - Dolniya (2015 Dubai Sheema Classic)
- Dixieland Band:
  - Drum Taps (1992-3 Ascot Gold Cup)
  - Dixie Brass (1990 Met Mile)
  - Egyptband (2000 Prix de Diane)
  - Dixie Union:
    - Union Rags (2012 Belmont Stakes)
- Lomond (1983 2000 Guineas):
  - Marling (1992 Irish 1000, Sussex)
- Shareef Dancer:
  - Nediym:
    - General Nediym (1998 Lightning)
      - Regimental Gal (2004 Lightning)
  - Possessive Dancer (1991 Oaks)
- El Gran Senor (1984 2000 Guineas, Irish Derby):
  - Belmez (1990 King George)
  - Rodrigo de Triano (1992 2000 Guineas, Irish 2000, International, Champion):
    - Erimo Excel (1998 Yushun Himba)
- Northern Trick (1984 Prix de Diane, Prix Vermeille)
- Fairy King:
  - Turtle Island (1994 Irish 2000):
    - Island Sands (1999 2000 Guineas)
  - Helissio (1996 Prix de l'Arc de Triomphe)
    - Helenus (2003 Rosehill Guineas)
      - Ethiopia (2012 Australian Derby)
  - Encosta de Lago:
    - Sacred Kingdom (2007, 2009 Hong Kong Sprint)
    - Northern Meteor:
      - Deep Field:
        - Sky Field (2021 Hong Kong Sprint)
    - Road to Rock (2010 Queen Elizabeth (AUS)):
      - Beauty Generation (2018-2019 Champions Mile)
    - Chautauqua (2016 Lightning)
  - Victory Note (1998 Poulains)
  - Oath (1999 Epsom Derby)
  - Falbrav (2002 International, Queen Elizabeth II, Japan Cup, 2003 Eclipse)
- Rakeen:
  - Jet Master (SAF):
    - J J the Jet Plane (SAF) (2010 Hong Kong Sprint)
    - Pomodoro (2012 Durban July)
- Ajdal:
  - Cezanne (1994 Irish Champion)
- Unfuwain:
  - Bolas (1994 Irish Oaks)
  - Lahan (2000 1000 Guineas)
  - Petrushka (2000 Irish Oaks)
  - Alhaarth:
    - Haafhd (2004 2000 Guineas, Champion)
    - Eswarah (2005 Epsom Oaks)
    - Phoenix Reach (2005 Dubai Sheema Classic)
  - Lailani (2001 Irish Oaks)
