= 2006 World Thoroughbred Racehorse Rankings =

The 2006 World Thoroughbred Racehorse Rankings is the 2006 edition of the World Thoroughbred Racehorse Rankings. It is an assessment of racehorses which was issued by the International Federation of Horseracing Authorities (IFHA) in January 2007. It includes horses aged three or older which raced or were trained during 2006 in countries where the flat racing year runs from January 1 to December 31. These countries are generally in the Northern Hemisphere.

The ratings represent a weight value in pounds, with higher values given to horses which showed greater ability. It is judged that these weights would equalize the abilities of the horses if carried in a theoretical handicap race. The list includes all horses rated 115 or above, and it also shows the surface and the distances at which the rating was achieved.

The highest rating in the 2006 season was 129, which was given to the performance of Invasor in the Breeders' Cup Classic. In total, 180 horses were included in the list, 32 more than in the 2005 Rankings.

== Full rankings for 2006 ==
- Country foaled – Horse names are followed by a suffix indicating the country where foaled.
- Age – The ages shown for horses foaled in the Northern Hemisphere are as of their universal date of increase, January 1, 2006. The ages of horses born in the Southern Hemisphere are taken from their equivalent date, August 1, 2006.
- Sex – The following abbreviations are used:
  - C – Colt – Ungelded male horse up to four-years-old.
  - F – Filly – Female horse up to four-years-old.
  - H – Horse – Ungelded male horse over four-years-old.
  - M – Mare – Female horse over four-years-old.
  - G – Gelding – Gelded male horse of any age.

Rank	Rating	Horse	Age	Sex	Trained	Surface	Distance (m)
1	129	Invasor (ARG)	4	C	United States	Dirt	2,000
2	128	Bernardini (USA)	3	C	United States	Dirt	2,000
2	128	Discreet Cat (USA)	3	C	United States	Dirt	1,600
4	127	Deep Impact (JPN)	4	C	Japan	Turf	2,500
4	127	George Washington (IRE)	3	C	Ireland	Turf	1,600
4	127	Lava Man (USA)	5	G	United States	Dirt	1,800
4	127	Rail Link (GB)	3	C	France	Turf	2,400
8	126	Barbaro (USA)	3	C	United States	Dirt	2,000
8	126	Dylan Thomas (IRE)	3	C	Ireland	Turf	2,000 / 2,400
8	126	Hurricane Run (IRE)	4	C	France	Turf	2,400
11	125	Electrocutionist (USA)	5	H	Great Britain	Turf	2,400
11	125	Shirocco (GER)	5	H	France	Turf	2,400
13	124	Heart's Cry (JPN)	5	H	Japan	Turf	2,400
14	123	David Junior (USA)	4	C	Great Britain	Turf	1,777 / 2,000
14	123	Premium Tap (USA)	4	C	United States	Dirt	1,800
14	123	Pride (FR)	6	M	France	Turf	2,000 / 2,400
17	122	Araafa (IRE)	3	C	Great Britain	Turf	1,600
17	122	Aragorn (IRE)	4	C	United States	Turf	1,800
17	122	Ouija Board (GB)	5	M	Great Britain	Turf	2,000 / 2,200
20	121	Admire Moon (JPN)	3	C	Japan	Turf	2,000
20	121	Daiwa Major (JPN)	5	H	Japan	Turf	1,600 / 2,000
20	121	Dream Passport (JPN)	3	C	Japan	Turf	2,400
20	121	English Channel (USA)	4	C	United States	Turf	2,200 / 2,400
20	121	Librettist (USA)	4	C	Great Britain	Turf	1,600
20	121	Notnowcato (GB)	4	C	Great Britain	Turf	2,080
20	121	Sir Percy (GB)	3	C	Great Britain	Turf	2,409
20	121	Yeats (IRE)	5	H	Ireland	Turf	3,200 / 4,000
28	120	Bullish Luck (USA)	7	G	Hong Kong	Turf	1,600
28	120	Cacique (IRE)	5	H	United States	Turf	2,200
28	120	Delta Blues (JPN)	5	H	Japan	Turf	3,200
28	120	Enforcer (GB)	4	C	Great Britain	Turf	2,400 / 2,409
28	120	Giacomo (USA)	4	C	United States	Dirt	2,000
28	120	Hala Bek (IRE)	3	C	Great Britain	Turf	2,409
28	120	Henny Hughes (USA)	3	C	United States	Dirt	1,200 / 1,400
28	120	Manduro (GER)	4	C	France	Turf	1,600 / 2,000
28	120	Maraahel (IRE)	5	H	Great Britain	Turf	2,080 / 2,400
28	120	Miesque's Approval (USA)	7	H	United States	Turf	1,600
28	120	Red Rocks (IRE)	3	C	Great Britain	Turf	2,400
28	120	Showing Up (USA)	3	C	United States	Turf	2,000
28	120	Stormy River (FR)	3	C	France	Turf	1,600
28	120	Takeover Target (AUS)	7	G	Australia	Turf	1,200
28	120	The Tin Man (USA)	8	G	United States	Turf	2,000
28	120	Thor's Echo (USA)	4	G	United States	Dirt	1,200
44	119	Alexander Goldrun (IRE)	5	M	Ireland	Turf	1,975
44	119	Better Talk Now (USA)	7	G	United States	Turf	2,400
44	119	Brother Derek (USA)	3	C	United States	Dirt	2,000
44	119	Court Masterpiece (GB)	6	H	Great Britain	Turf	1,600
44	119	Grey Swallow (IRE)	5	H	Ireland	Turf	2,000
44	119	Jazil (USA)	3	C	United States	Dirt	2,400
44	119	Mountain High (IRE)	4	C	Great Britain	Turf	2,400
44	119	Pop Rock (JPN)	5	H	Japan	Turf	2,500
44	119	Rob Roy (USA)	4	C	Great Britain	Turf	2,000
44	119	Silver Train (USA)	4	C	United States	Dirt	1,400 / 1,600
44	119	Soapy Danger (GB)	3	C	Great Britain	Turf	2,400
44	119	Swift Current (JPN)	5	H	Japan	Turf	2,000
56	118	Alexandrova (IRE)	3	F	Ireland	Turf	2,400
56	118	Artie Schiller (USA)	5	H	United States	Turf	1,600
56	118	Bordonaro (USA)	5	G	United States	Dirt	1,200
56	118	Brass Hat (USA)	5	G	United States	Dirt	1,800
56	118	Cherry Mix (FR)	5	H	Great Britain	Turf	2,000 / 2,400
56	118	Collier Hill (GB)	8	G	Great Britain	Turf	2,400
56	118	Corre Caminos (FR)	4	G	France	Turf	2,100
56	118	Dragon Dancer (GB)	3	C	Great Britain	Turf	2,409
56	118	Gorella (FR)	4	F	United States	Turf	1,600 / 1,900
56	118	Iffraaj (GB)	5	H	Great Britain	Turf	1,400
56	118	Kane Hekili (JPN)	4	C	Japan	Dirt	1,600
56	118	Laverock (IRE)	4	C	France	Turf	2,400
56	118	Les Arcs (USA)	6	G	Great Britain	Turf	1,200
56	118	Mandesha (FR)	3	F	France	Turf	2,000
56	118	Wait a While (USA)	3	F	United States	Turf	2,000
56	118	Youmzain (IRE)	3	C	Great Britain	Turf	2,400
72	117	Ad Valorem (USA)	4	C	Ireland	Turf	1,600
72	117	Adjudi Mitsuo (JPN)	5	H	Japan	Dirt	2,000
72	117	Aussie Rules (USA)	3	C	Ireland	Turf	1,600 / 2,006
72	117	Best Name (GB)	3	C	France	Turf	2,400
72	117	Blue Monday (GB)	5	G	Great Britain	Turf	2,006 / 2,205
72	117	Bluegrass Cat (USA)	3	C	United States	Dirt	1,800 / 2,400
72	117	Cosmo Bulk (JPN)	5	H	Japan	Turf	2,000 / 2,400
72	117	Desert Lord (GB)	6	G	Great Britain	Turf	1,000
72	117	Einstein (BRZ)	4	C	United States	Turf	1,800
72	117	Fleet Indian (USA)	5	M	United States	Dirt	1,800 / 2,000
72	117	Gentlewave (IRE)	3	C	France	Turf	2,400
72	117	Go Deputy (USA)	6	H	United States	Turf	2,200 / 2,400
72	117	Good Reward (USA)	5	H	United States	Dirt	2,000
72	117	Irish Wells (FR)	3	C	France	Turf	2,400
72	117	Kastoria (IRE)	5	M	Ireland	Turf	2,800
72	117	King's Drama (IRE)	6	G	United States	Turf	2,000 / 2,400
72	117	Lincoln (JPN)	6	H	Japan	Turf	3,200
72	117	Majors Cast (IRE)	5	H	Great Britain	Turf	1,600
72	117	Meisho Samson (JPN)	3	C	Japan	Turf	2,400
72	117	Milk It Mick (GB)	5	H	United States	Turf	1,800
72	117	Mustameet (USA)	5	H	Ireland	Turf	2,000
72	117	Peeress (GB)	5	M	Great Britain	Turf	1,600
72	117	Reverence (GB)	5	G	Great Britain	Turf	1,000
72	117	Round Pond (USA)	4	F	United States	Dirt	1,800
72	117	Second of June (USA)	5	H	United States	Dirt	1,800
72	117	Siren Lure (USA)	5	G	United States	Dirt	1,400
72	117	Sixties Icon (GB)	3	C	Great Britain	Turf	2,779
72	117	Sleeping Indian (GB)	5	H	Great Britain	Turf	1,400
72	117	Song of Wind (JPN)	3	C	Japan	Turf	3,000
72	117	Spinning Queen (GB)	3	F	Great Britain	Turf	1,600
72	117	Sun King (USA)	4	C	United States	Dirt	1,600 / 1,800
72	117	Surf Cat (USA)	4	C	United States	Dirt	1,700
72	117	Visindar (GB)	3	C	France	Turf	2,409
105	116	Admire Main (JPN)	3	C	Japan	Turf	2,400
105	116	Ashkal Way (IRE)	4	G	United States	Turf	1,700
105	116	Balletto (UAE)	4	F	United States	Dirt	1,800
105	116	Darsi (FR)	3	C	France	Turf	2,100
105	116	Distant Way (USA)	5	H	Italy	Turf	2,000
105	116	Dubai Escapade (USA)	4	F	United States	Dirt	1,400
105	116	Echo of Light (GB)	4	C	Great Britain	Dirt / Turf	1,600 / 1,789
105	116	Film Maker (USA)	6	M	United States	Turf	2,200
105	116	First Samurai (USA)	3	C	United States	Dirt	1,500
105	116	Honey Ryder (USA)	5	M	United States	Turf	2,000
105	116	Kentucky Dynamite (USA)	3	C	France	Turf	1,600
105	116	Marchand d'Or (FR)	3	G	France	Turf	1,300
105	116	Moss Vale (IRE)	5	H	Great Britain	Turf	1,000 / 1,200
105	116	Olympian Odyssey (GB)	3	C	Great Britain	Turf	2,000
105	116	Prince Flori (GER)	3	C	Germany	Turf	2,400
105	116	Ramonti (FR)	4	C	Italy	Turf	1,600
105	116	Relaxed Gesture (IRE)	5	H	United States	Turf	2,000
105	116	Satwa Queen (FR)	4	F	France	Turf	2,000
105	116	Septimus (IRE)	3	C	Ireland	Turf	2,080
105	116	Soldier Hollow (GB)	6	H	Germany	Turf	1,950
105	116	Suave (USA)	5	H	United States	Dirt	1,900
105	116	Super Frolic (USA)	6	H	United States	Dirt	2,000
105	116	Sweetnorthernsaint (USA)	3	G	United States	Dirt	1,800 / 1,900
105	116	Symboli Gran (IRE)	4	C	Japan	Turf	1,600
105	116	Utopia (JPN)	6	H	Japan	Dirt	1,600
130	115	Ace (IRE)	5	H	Ireland	Turf	2,000 / 2,409
130	115	Arcadio (GER)	4	C	Germany	Turf	2,200
130	115	Asakusa Den'en (GB)	7	H	Japan	Turf	1,600
130	115	Balance of Game (JPN)	7	H	Japan	Turf	1,800 / 2,200
130	115	Balthazaar's Gift (IRE)	3	C	Great Britain	Turf	1,200
130	115	Best Alibi (IRE)	3	C	Great Britain	Turf	2,400 / 2,409
130	115	Blue Concorde (JPN)	6	H	Japan	Dirt	2,000
130	115	Blue Ksar (FR)	3	C	Great Britain	Turf	1,600
130	115	Buzzards Bay (USA)	4	C	United States	Dirt	1,800
130	115	Caradak (IRE)	5	H	Great Britain	Turf	1,400 / 1,600
130	115	Dance in the Mood (JPN)	5	M	Japan	Turf	1,600
130	115	Dandy Man (IRE)	3	C	Ireland	Turf	1,000
130	115	Day Flight (GB)	5	H	Great Britain	Turf	2,400
130	115	Distinction (IRE)	7	G	Great Britain	Turf	2,655
130	115	Egerton (GER)	5	H	Germany	Turf	2,400
130	115	Flashing Numbers (USA)	3	C	Germany	Turf	2,000
130	115	Healthy Addiction (USA)	5	M	United States	Dirt	1,700
130	115	High Limit (USA)	4	C	United States	Dirt	1,800
130	115	Joyful Winner (AUS)	6	G	Hong Kong	Turf	1,600
130	115	Kawakami Princess (JPN)	3	F	Japan	Turf	2,200
130	115	Killybegs (IRE)	3	C	Great Britain	Turf	1,400 / 1,600
130	115	Krataios (FR)	6	G	France	Turf	1,850
130	115	Lateral (GB)	3	C	Germany	Turf	1,600
130	115	Lawyer Ron (USA)	3	C	United States	Dirt	1,800
130	115	Linda's Lad (GB)	3	C	France	Turf	2,296
130	115	Lord of England (GER)	3	C	Germany	Turf	1,750 / 2,000
130	115	Lost in the Fog (USA)	4	C	United States	Dirt	1,200
130	115	Mubtaker (USA)	9	H	Great Britain	Turf	2,405
130	115	Nannina (GB)	3	F	Great Britain	Turf	1,600 / 1,975
130	115	Narita Century (JPN)	7	H	Japan	Turf	2,200
130	115	Nightmare Affair (USA)	5	H	United States	Dirt	1,200
130	115	Papal Bull (GB)	3	C	Great Britain	Turf	2,400
130	115	Percussionist (IRE)	5	G	Great Britain	Turf	2,779
130	115	Perfect Drift (USA)	7	G	United States	Dirt	1,800
130	115	Pine Island (USA)	3	F	United States	Dirt	1,800
130	115	Policy Maker (IRE)	6	H	France	Turf	2,400
130	115	Proud Tower Too (USA)	4	C	United States	Dirt	1,200
130	115	Red Evie (IRE)	3	F	Great Britain	Turf	1,600
130	115	Satchem (IRE)	4	C	Great Britain	Turf	1,400 / 1,600
130	115	Schiaparelli (GER)	3	C	Germany	Turf	2,400
130	115	Sergeant Cecil (GB)	7	G	Great Britain	Turf	4,000
130	115	Sharp Humor (USA)	3	C	United States	Dirt	1,800
130	115	Sinister Minister (USA)	3	C	United States	Dirt	1,800
130	115	Songster (USA)	3	C	United States	Dirt	1,400
130	115	Strong Contender (USA)	3	C	United States	Dirt	1,800
130	115	Sunriver (USA)	3	C	United States	Dirt	2,400
130	115	T. H. Approval (USA)	5	H	United States	Turf	2,200 / 2,400
130	115	Take D'Tour (USA)	5	M	United States	Dirt	1,700
130	115	Tam Lin (GB)	3	C	Great Britain	Turf	2,205
130	115	Touch of Land (FR)	6	H	France	Turf	2,000
130	115	Wanderin Boy (USA)	5	H	United States	Dirt	1,900

Certain horses may have also recorded a lesser rating over a distance different from that listed above. The IFHA publishes this information when the lower rating represents the overall top performance in a particular category. There was one such additional rating for this season:

Rank	Rating	Horse	Age	Sex	Trained	Surface	Distance (m)
+	123	Deep Impact (JPN)	4	C	Japan	Turf	3,200

== Top ranked horses ==
The tables below show the top ranked horses overall, the top fillies and mares, and the top three-year-olds in the 2006 Rankings. They also show the top performers in various subdivisions of each group, which are defined by the distances of races, and the surfaces on which they are run. The IFHA recognizes five distance categories — Sprint, Mile, Intermediate, Long and Extended — identified by the acronym "SMILE". These are framed as follows:

- Sprint: 1,000–1,300m (1,000–1,599m for races in Canada and the United States)
- Mile: 1,301–1,899m (1,600–1,899m for races in Canada and the United States)
- Intermediate: 1,900–2,100m
- Long: 2,101–2,700m
- Extended: 2,701m +

All Horses
	All Surfaces	Dirt	Turf
All Distances	129 – Invasor	129 – Invasor	127 – Deep Impact; 127 – George Washington; 127 – Rail Link
Sprint	120 – Henny Hughes; 120 – Takeover Target; 120 – Thor's Echo	120 – Henny Hughes; 120 – Thor's Echo	120 – Takeover Target
Mile	128 – Discreet Cat	128 – Discreet Cat	127 – George Washington
Intermediate	129 – Invasor	129 – Invasor	126 – Dylan Thomas
Long	127 – Deep Impact; 127 – Rail Link	119 – Jazil	127 – Deep Impact; 127 – Rail Link
Extended	123 – Deep Impact	not listed	123 – Deep Impact
Fillies and Mares
	All Surfaces	Dirt	Turf
All Distances	123 – Pride	117 – Fleet Indian; 117 – Round Pond	123 – Pride
Sprint	116 – Dubai Escapade	116 – Dubai Escapade	not listed
Mile	118 – Gorella	117 – Fleet Indian; 117 – Round Pond	118 – Gorella
Intermediate	123 – Pride	117 – Fleet Indian	123 – Pride
Long	123 – Pride	not listed	123 – Pride
Extended	117 – Kastoria	not listed	117 – Kastoria
Three-Year-Olds
	All Surfaces	Dirt	Turf
All Distances	128 – Bernardini; 128 – Discreet Cat	128 – Bernardini; 128 – Discreet Cat	127 – George Washington; 127 – Rail Link
Sprint	120 – Henny Hughes	120 – Henny Hughes	116 – Marchand d'Or
Mile	128 – Discreet Cat	128 – Discreet Cat	127 – George Washington
Intermediate	128 – Bernardini	128 – Bernardini	126 – Dylan Thomas
Long	127 – Rail Link	119 – Jazil	127 – Rail Link
Extended	117 – Sixties Icon; 117 – Song of Wind	not listed	117 – Sixties Icon; 117 – Song of Wind
