= Aqaarid =

American-bred Thoroughbred racehorse

- Sire: Nashwan
- Grandsire: Blushing Groom
- Dam: Ashayer
- Damsire: Lomond
- Sex: Mare
- Foaled: 14 January 1992
- Country: United States
- Colour: Bay
- Breeder: Shadwell Farm
- Owner: Hamdan Al Maktoum
- Trainer: John Dunlop
- Record: 5: 3-1-0
- Earnings: £169,114

Major wins
- Fillies' Mile (1994); Fred Darling Stakes (1995)

Aqaarid (foaled 14 January 1992) was an American-bred British-trained Thoroughbred racehorse and broodmare who was the beaten favourite in two of the five British Classic Races. In a racing career which lasted from July 1994 until June 1995 she won three of her five starts. As a two-year-old she won a minor race on her debut and then stepped up in class to win the Group One Fillies' Mile at Ascot Racecourse. After winning a very strong renewal of the Fred Darling Stakes in the following spring she was beaten by Harayir when favoured to win the 1000 Guineas. A month later she started a short-priced favourite for The Oaks but finished sixth behind Moonshell.

== Background ==
Aqaarid was a bay mare with white socks on her front feet bred in Kentucky by her owner Hamdan Al Maktoum's Shadwell Farm. She was sired by Nashwan an outstanding racehorse who won the 2000 Guineas, Epsom Derby, Eclipse Stakes and King George VI and Queen Elizabeth Stakes in 1989. His other progeny included Swain, Bago and One So Wonderful. Her dam Ashayer was a top-class racemare who won the Prix Marcel Boussac in 1987 and the Prix de Psyché in the following year. Ashayer was a granddaughter of Violetta, an exceptional broodmare whose descendants have included Teenoso, Rule of Law, Harayir and Sir Percy. Both Nashwan and Ashayer raced in Hamdan Al Maktoum's colours.

Like her dam, Aqaarid was trained throughout her racing career by John Dunlop at Arundel in West Sussex. She was ridden in all of her races by Willie Carson.

== Racing career ==
=== 1994: two-year-old season ===
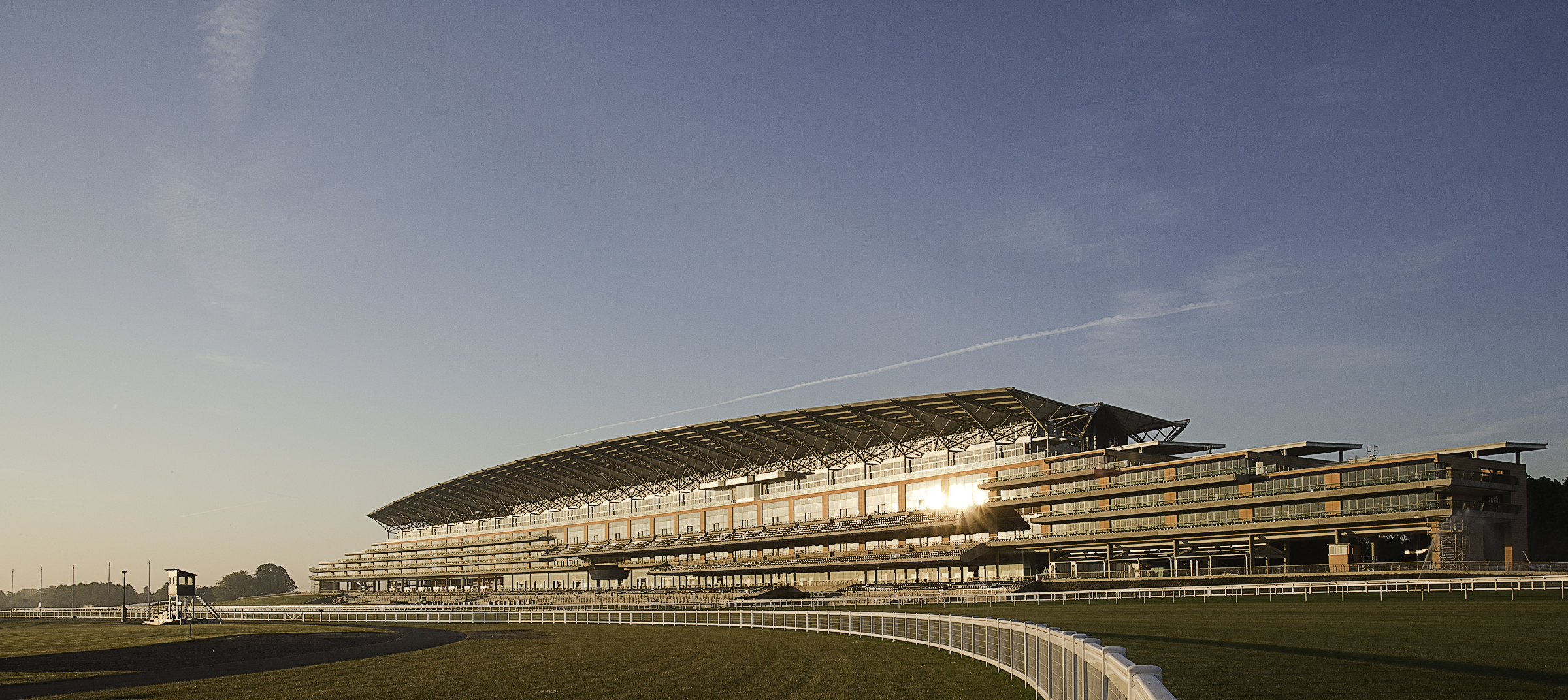
Ascot Racwcourse, where Aqaarid won the Fillies' Mile

Aqaarid made her first appearance in a six furlong maiden race at Ascot Racecourse on 22 July. The Peter Chapple-Hyam-trained Avignon was made favourite with Aqaarid starting at odds of 8/1 in a nine-runner field. After starting slowly she raced at the rear of the field and appeared to be under pressure two furlongs out, but produced a strong finish take the lead in the final strides to win by a neck from Alusha, with Didina a neck away in third.

After a break of two months, Aqaarid was moved up sharply in class and distance for the Group One Fillies' Mile at Ascot. She started the 11/2 third choice in the betting behind the Prestige Stakes winner Pure Grain and the Mark Johnston-trained Jural who had won the Sweet Solera Stakes in England and the Futurity Stakes in Ireland. The best fancied of the other six runners was Dance A Dream, a maiden race winner who went on to take the Cheshire Oaks. Aqaarid was restrained by Carson before turning into the straight in fourth place behind the outsiders Snowstorm, Miasma and Musetta. She began to make progress in the last quarter mile, overtook Snowstorm inside the final furlong and won by half a length from the fast-finishing Jural. Snowstorm was three quarters of a length away in third ahead of Pure Grain and Musetta.

=== 1995: three-year-old season ===
Racing colours of Hamdan Al Maktoum

On her first appearance as a three-year-old Aqaarid was one of eight fillies to contest the Fred Darling Stakes (a trial race for the 1000 Guineas) over seven furlongs at Newbury Racecourse on 21 April. She started the 9/4 joint favourite with Gay Gallanta a filly who had been voted Cartier Champion Two-year-old Filly in 1994 after winning the Cheveley Park Stakes whilst the best fancied of the other runners was the Prix Morny winner Hoh Magic. Aqaarid was amongst the leaders from the start, went to the front two furlongs out and won by two and a half lengths from Hoh Magic with Gay Gallanta in fifth place.

The 182nd running of the 1000 Guineas over the Rowley Mile at Newmarket Racecourse on 7 May saw Aqaarid starting the 3/1 favourite in a fourteen-runner field, with Carson opting to ride her in preference to Harayir. After racing prominently throughout the race, she moved into second place a furlong out but could make no further progress and was beaten one and a half lengths by Harayir, with Moonshell three quarters of a length away in third. The other beaten horses included Hoh Magic, Gay Gallanta, the Prix Imprudence winner Macoumba and the Nell Gwyn Stakes winner Myself. At Epsom Downs Racecourse on 9 June Aqaarid started 6/4 favourite for the Oaks Stakes over one and a half miles. She turned into the straight in fourth place but weakened in the last quarter mile and finished sixth of the ten runners behind Moonshell. After the race Carson stated that she had been unsuited by the firm ground.

== Breeding record ==
Aqaarid was retired from racing to become a broodmare for her owner's Shadwell Stud. In November 2005 she was auctioned at Keeneland and was bought for $100,000 by Blandford Bloodstock on behalf of Bjorn Nielsen. She has produced nine foals and three minor winners:

- Elmonjed, a dark bay or brown colt, foaled in 1998, sired by Gulch. Won five races.
- Taaly, bay filly, 1999, by Storm Cat. Unraced.
- Alafdal, bay colt (later gelded), 2000, by Gone West. Failed to win in nine races.
- Anayid, bay filly, 2001, by A.P. Indy. Unraced.
- Ladeena, bay filly, 2002, by Dubai Millennium. Won one race.
- Alzehba, dark bay or brown filly, 2005, by Elusive Quality. Won one race.
- Josie May, grey filly, 2006, by Aljabr. Uraced.
- Polyphemus, chestnut colt, 2007, by Giant's Causeway. Failed to win in seventeen races.
- Childrey, dark bay or brown filly, 2008, by Dynaformer. Unraced.
- Ile Flottante, filly, 2011, by Duke of Marmalade. Unraced.

== Pedigree ==
Pedigree of Aqaarid (USA), bay mare, 1992
Sire Nashwan (USA) 1986	Blushing Groom (FR); 1974	Red God	Nasrullah
Sire Nashwan (USA) 1986	Blushing Groom (FR); 1974	Red God	Spring Run
Sire Nashwan (USA) 1986	Blushing Groom (FR); 1974	Runaway Bride	Wild Risk
Sire Nashwan (USA) 1986	Blushing Groom (FR); 1974	Runaway Bride	Aimée
Sire Nashwan (USA) 1986	Height of Fashion (GB); 1979	Bustino	Busted
Sire Nashwan (USA) 1986	Height of Fashion (GB); 1979	Bustino	Ship Yard
Sire Nashwan (USA) 1986	Height of Fashion (GB); 1979	Highclere	Queen's Hussar
Sire Nashwan (USA) 1986	Height of Fashion (GB); 1979	Highclere	Highlight
Dam Ashayer (GB) 1985	Lomond (USA); 1980	Northern Dancer	Nearctic
Dam Ashayer (GB) 1985	Lomond (USA); 1980	Northern Dancer	Natalma
Dam Ashayer (GB) 1985	Lomond (USA); 1980	My Charmer	Poker
Dam Ashayer (GB) 1985	Lomond (USA); 1980	My Charmer	Fair Charmer
Dam Ashayer (GB) 1985	Good Lassie (GB); 1977	Moulton	Pardao
Dam Ashayer (GB) 1985	Good Lassie (GB); 1977	Moulton	Close Up
Dam Ashayer (GB) 1985	Good Lassie (GB); 1977	Violetta	Pinza
Dam Ashayer (GB) 1985	Good Lassie (GB); 1977	Violetta	Urshalim (Family: 13-c)
