= Moon shell =

Moon shell or Moonshell may refer to:

- Euspira heros, the northern moon snail
- Neverita didyma, the bladder moon snail
- Naticidae, or moon snails, a family of predatory sea snails
- Moonshell (horse), a racehorse
