= Old Trieste =

American Thoroughbred racehorse

- Sire: A.P. Indy
- Dam: Lovelier Linda
- Damsire: Cormorant
- Sex: Stallion
- Foaled: 1995
- Country: United States
- Colour: Chestnut
- Breeder: W. R. Hawn
- Owner: Cobra Farm
- Trainer: Mike Puype
- Record: 14: 6-1-3
- Earnings: $847,944

Major wins
- Californian Stakes (1999)

Old Trieste (1995–2003) was an American Thoroughbred racehorse. He was a chestnut by A.P. Indy and out of the mare Lovelier Linda. He contended for the 1998 Triple Crown but finished unplaced behind Real Quiet in the Kentucky Derby. In the following year he recorded his most significant win when taking the Grade II Californian Stakes at Hollywood Park Racetrack. In a brief stud career he sired the Grade I winners Silver Train and Sinister Minister. He was euthanized in 2003 due to complications from laminitis. The horse was named after the Old Trieste Restaurant in San Diego, California.
