= Silver Train (horse) =

American-bred Thoroughbred racehorse

- Sire: Old Trieste
- Grandsire: A.P. Indy
- Dam: Ridden In The Stars
- Damsire: Cormorant
- Sex: Stallion
- Foaled: February 11, 2002
- Country: United States
- Colour: Brown
- Breeder: Mulholland Farm
- Owner: Buckram Oak Farm
- Trainer: Richard E. Dutrow, Jr.
- Record: 17: 6-3-4
- Earnings: $1,259,345

Major wins
- Jerome Handicap (2005); Tom Fool Handicap (2006); Metropolitan Handicap (2006) Breeders' Cup wins: Breeders' Cup Sprint (2005)
- Last updated on July 22, 2007

Silver Train (foaled February 11, 2002) was an American Thoroughbred racehorse. Bred by Joe Mulholland and family in Georgetown, Kentucky, he was out of the mare Ridden In The Stars and sired by Old Trieste, a son of U.S. Racing Hall of Fame inductee A.P. Indy.

Purchased by the Buckram Oak Farm of Mahmoud Fustuq, at age two Silver Train raced four times, winning once and finishing second twice. At age three in 2005, he won three times, including the Grade II Jerome Handicap, plus had three third-place finishes. Ridden by Edgar Prado in the most important win of his career, Silver Train overtook a tiring Lost in the Fog in midstretch and held off a fast charging Taste of Paradise to win the six furlong Breeders' Cup Sprint at Belmont Park.

Sold in 2006 to Four Roses Thoroughbreds, Silver Train won the Grade II Tom Fool Handicap and the Grade I Metropolitan Mile. In October's Vosburgh Stakes, he ran a disappointing last in a five-horse field. Believing the horse might be out of his element in attempting a second straight win in the 2006 Breeders' Cup Sprint, trainer Richard E. Dutrow, Jr. opted to run him in November's Cigar Mile Handicap where he ran third to Discreet Cat. Silver Train was then retired to stand at stud for the 2007 season at the Vinery Kentucky in Lexington. In 2011, Silver Train was purchased by HnR Nothhaft Horseracing LLC and moved to Northview PA. Silver Train was number one in winners among 2nd year sires in 2011.
