= Harayir =

American-bred Thoroughbred racehorse

- Racing colours of Hamdan Al Maktoum
- Sire: Gulch
- Grandsire: Mr. Prospector
- Dam: Saffaanh
- Damsire: Shareef Dancer
- Sex: Mare
- Foaled: 22 March 1992
- Country: United States
- Colour: Bay
- Breeder: Shadwell Farm
- Owner: Hamdan Al Maktoum
- Trainer: Dick Hern
- Record: 13: 6-2-3
- Earnings: £309,096

Major wins
- Lowther Stakes (1994); 1000 Guineas (1995); Hungerford Stakes (1995); Celebration Mile (1995); Challenge Stakes (1995)

Harayir (22 March 1992 – 2014) was an American-bred, British-trained Thoroughbred racehorse. In a racing career which lasted from June 1994 to October 1995 she ran thirteen times and won six races. As a two-year-old she won two races, including the Group Two Lowther Stakes at York. The following spring, Harayir became the first horse to win a Classic on a Sunday, when she was victorious in the 1000 Guineas at Newmarket Racecourse after being rejected by her regular jockey Willie Carson in favour of her owner's other runner Aqaarid. Her success gave her trainer Dick Hern his fourteenth and final classic winner. Later in the year, Harayir competed successfully against colts and older horses, winning the Hungerford Stakes at Newbury, the Celebration Mile at Goodwood and the Challenge Stakes at Newmarket. She was retired from racing to become a broodmare.

== Background ==
Harayir was a bay filly with white socks on her hind legs, bred in Kentucky by her owner, Hamdan Al Maktoum's Shadwell Farm. She was sired by Gulch, a son of Mr. Prospector, who was named 1988 American Champion Sprint Horse. Gulch was a successful stallion, siring the multiple Group One winner Nayef and the Japan Cup Dirt winner Eagle Cafe. Harayir's dam, Saffaanh failed to win a race in five attempts, but was a daughter of the Irish Oaks winner Give Thanks. As a granddaughter of the broodmare Violetta, Give Thanks was closely related to The Derby winner Teenoso.

Harayir was trained by the veteran Dick Hern at West Ilsley in Berkshire and was ridden in all but one of her races by Willie Carson.

== Racing career ==
=== 1994: two-year-old season ===
Harayir made her first racecourse appearance at Newbury Racecourse in June 1994. She started favourite for a six furlong maiden race and won by one and a quarter lengths from Royal Rebuke. At Newmarket's July meeting, Harayir was moved up in class to Group Three level to contest the six furlong Cherry Hinton Stakes. Willie Carson sent the filly into the lead a furlong and a half from the finish but she was caught in the last stride and beaten a short head by Red Carnival. At York in August, Harayir recorded her first major win in the Group Two Lowther Stakes. Starting the 2/1 joint favourite, she took the lead entering the final furlong and drew clear to win by three lengths from Gay Gallanta. The Racing Post described the performance as "impressive", and the filly was made ante-post favourite for the following year's 1000 Guineas. On her final appearance of the year, Harayir started favourite for the Group One Cheveley Park Stakes at Newmarket, and finished third to Gay Gallanta and Tanami. Gay Gallanta's performance was enough to see her named European champion two-year-old filly.

=== 1995: three-year-old season ===
Harayir's three-year-old debut saw her matched against colts as she carried top weight of 133 pounds in the European Free Handicap in April. She led briefly in the final furlong before finishing second to Diffident, a French-trained colt carrying 131. In his capacity as jockey for Hamdan Al Maktoum, Willie Carson had a choice of rides for the 1995 1000 Guineas. After being thought likely to partner Harayir he changed his mind and switched to Aqaarid, an unbeaten filly from the John Dunlop stable, leaving the ride on Harayir to Richard Hills: he described the decision as "a difficult choice". Aqaarid started 3/1 favourite for the 1000 Guineas, with Harayir sharing second place in the betting with the Godolphin filly Moonshell on 5/1. The race was the first British Classic to be run on a Sunday. Hills tracked the leaders on Harayir, before sending the filly to the front a furlong from the finish. Aqaarid and Moonshell emerged from the pack to challenge, but Harayir ran on strongly to win by one and a half lengths. Aqaarid beat Moonshell by three quarters of a length for second, with Gay Gallanta four lengths further back in seventh.

Carson was reunited with Harayir for the Irish 1,000 Guineas at the Curragh three weeks later in which the British Classic winner was expected to prove comfortably superior to a field which included the leading Irish filly Ridgewood Pearl. Harayir reached second place in the straight but weakened to finish into fifth place eight lengths behind Ridgewood Pearl, who won easily. Harayir started favourite for her rematch with Ridgewood Pearl in the Coronation Stakes at Royal Ascot where she was expected to be better suited by the firm ground. Ridgewood Pearl however, maintained her superiority, winning by two lengths from Smolensk, with Harayir third. In the Falmouth Stakes at Newmarket Harayir suffered a third consecutive defeat after thunderstorms the day before the race softened her preferred firm ground. Attempting to concede six pounds to her opponents, she finished third to Caramba and Gay Gallanta.

In August, Harayir was dropped to Group Three level for the Hungerford Stakes at Newbury where she raced against colts and older horses. Despite carrying an eight-pound weight penalty for her Classic win, she started 9/4 favourite and was never seriously pressed to win impressively from the four-year-old gelding Nijo. Fifteen days later, Harayir added a second success in mixed company, beating the colt Darnay by half a length in the Group Two Celebration Mile at Goodwood. In September Harayir moved down to sprint distances for the first time since her two-year-old days and finished fourth to Cool Jazz in the Diadem Stakes at Newmarket. Harayir's final appearance came in the Group Two Challenge Stakes over seven furlongs at Newmarket in October. She started favourite against a field which included Red Carnival and Cool Jazz, as well as the Lockinge Stakes winner Soviet Line. Carson retrained the filly before moving up to take the lead entering the final furlong. In the closing stages she was pushed out to win by half a length from Soviet Line. After the race, Hern praised the filly's durability and versatility, describing her as "a joy to train". Harayir was expected to end her career with a run in the Breeders' Cup Mile but sustained a leg injury when exercising at Belmont Park shortly before the race and was retired from racing.

== Assessment ==
In their book, A Century of Champions, based on the Timeform rating system, John Randall and Tony Morris rated Harayir an "inferior" winner of the 1000 Guineas.

== Stud record ==
Harayir was retired to become a broodmare for Shadwell Farm, being based at the Derrinstown Stud in County Kildare, Ireland. Her record had not been impressive. Her son Izdiham (sired by Nashwan) won at Listed level and finished third in the Gordon Stakes. Moonjaz, also by Nashwan, had some success as a racehorse in Switzerland. Harayir died in 2014.

Foaling Record

1997 Moonjaz (GB) : Chesnut colt, foaled 20 January, by Nashwan (USA) – winner in England 2001 and in Switzerland 2004

1999 Izdiham (IRE) : Chesnut colt, foaled 16 February, by Nashwan (USA) – won LR Gala Stakes, Sandown, 3rd G3 Gordon Stakes, Goodwood, 3rd G3 Rose of Lancaster Stakes, Haydock in England 2002/3

2005 Amhooj (GB) : Brown filly, foaled 12 February, by Green Desert (USA) – placed 5 times from 7 races in England 2007/8. Dam of a winner

2007 Azizi (GB) : Bay gelding, foaled 30 January, by Haafhd (GB) – won 3 races, 4th G3 Autumn Stakes, Ascot in England 2009

2010 Enfijaar (IRE) : Bay filly, foaled 3 February, by Invincible Spirit (IRE) – minor winner in England 2013

== Pedigree ==
Pedigree of Harayir (USA), bay mare, 1992
Sire Gulch (USA) 1984	Mr. Prospector; 1970	Raise a Native	Native Dancer
Sire Gulch (USA) 1984	Mr. Prospector; 1970	Raise a Native	Raise You
Sire Gulch (USA) 1984	Mr. Prospector; 1970	Gold Digger	Nashua
Sire Gulch (USA) 1984	Mr. Prospector; 1970	Gold Digger	Sequence
Sire Gulch (USA) 1984	Jameela; 1976	Rambunctious	Rasper
Sire Gulch (USA) 1984	Jameela; 1976	Rambunctious	Danaë
Sire Gulch (USA) 1984	Jameela; 1976	Asbury Mary	Seven Corners
Sire Gulch (USA) 1984	Jameela; 1976	Asbury Mary	Snow Flyer
Dam Saffaanh (USA) 1986	Shareef Dancer; 1980	Northern Dancer	Nearctic
Dam Saffaanh (USA) 1986	Shareef Dancer; 1980	Northern Dancer	Natalma
Dam Saffaanh (USA) 1986	Shareef Dancer; 1980	Sweet Alliance	Sir Ivor
Dam Saffaanh (USA) 1986	Shareef Dancer; 1980	Sweet Alliance	Mrs Peterkin
Dam Saffaanh (USA) 1986	Give Thanks; 1980	Relko	Tanerko
Dam Saffaanh (USA) 1986	Give Thanks; 1980	Relko	Relance
Dam Saffaanh (USA) 1986	Give Thanks; 1980	Parthica	Parthia
Dam Saffaanh (USA) 1986	Give Thanks; 1980	Parthica	Violetta (Family: 3-c)
