= Sinister Minister (horse) =

American-bred Thoroughbred racehorse

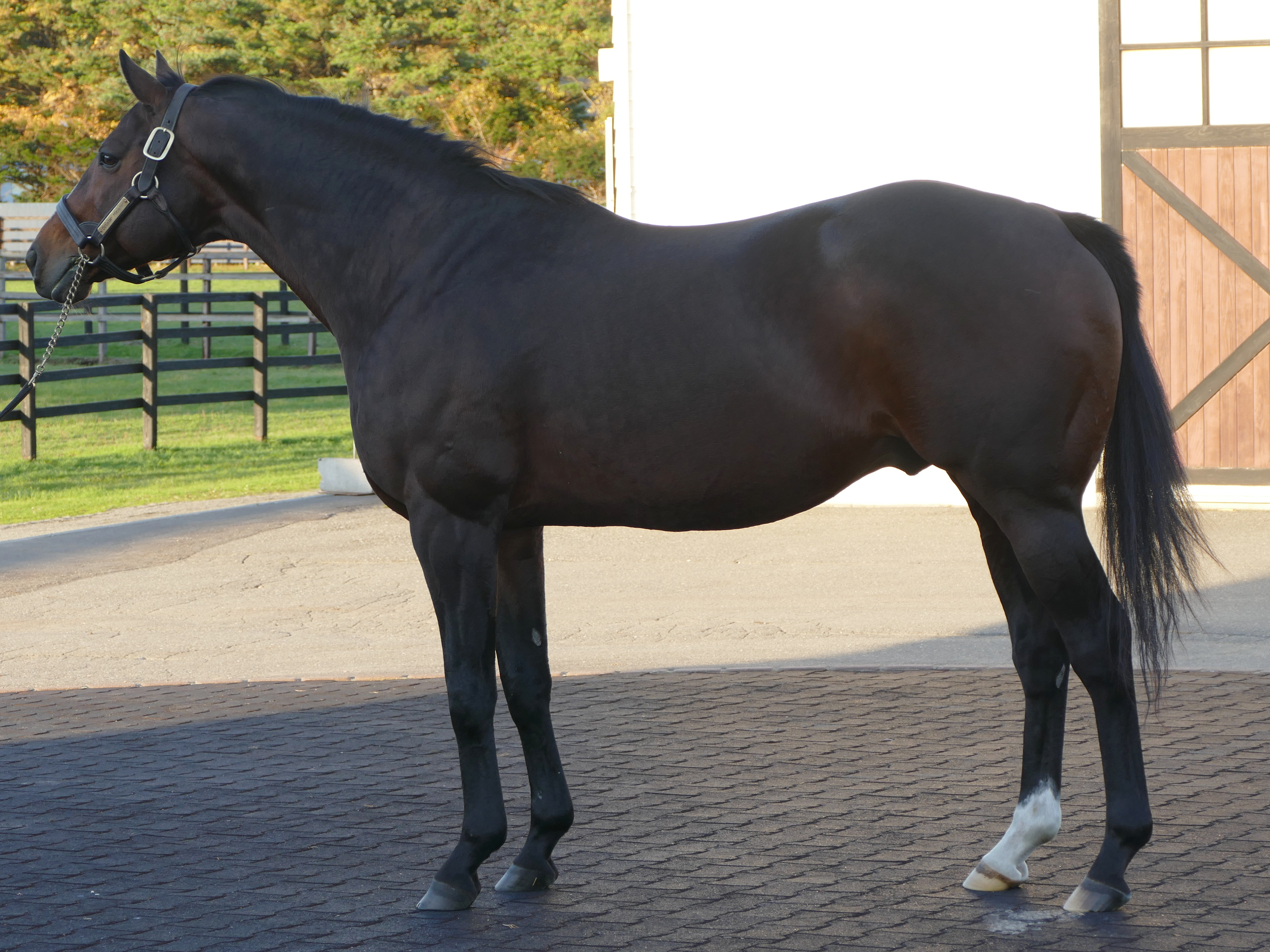
- Sinister Minister in 2020
- Sire: Old Trieste
- Grandsire: A.P. Indy
- Dam: Sweet Minister
- Damsire: The Prime Minister
- Sex: Ridgling
- Foaled: 2003
- Country: United States
- Colour: Bay
- Breeder: Mr. and Mrs. Michael L. Owens
- Owner: Lanni Family Trust, Mercedes Stb. & Schiappa
- Trainer: Bob Baffert
- Record: 13: 2-2-2
- Earnings: $541,826

Major wins
- Blue Grass Stakes (2006)
- Last updated on April 14, 2007

Sinister Minister is a thoroughbred race horse. As a foal born on March 29, 2003, he was a possible contender for the American Triple Crown in 2006.

== Connections ==
Sinister Minister is owned by the Lanni Family Trust and trained by Bob Baffert. He's often been ridden by Victor Espinoza.

Sinister Minister was bred in Kentucky by Mr & Mrs. Michael L. Owens. Sired by Old Trieste, his dam is Sweet Minister by The Prime Minister.

== Stud career ==
Sinister Minister was retired to stud in 2008 and stands at the Arrow Stud in Japan.

=== Notable progeny ===
c = colt, f = filly, g = gelding

Foaled	Name	Sex	Major Wins
2014	Yamanin Imprime	f	JBC Ladies' Classic
2017	T O Keynes	c	Teio Sho, Champions Cup, JBC Classic
2019	Dry Stout	c	Zen-Nippon Nisai Yushun
2019	King's Sword	c	JBC Classic, Teio Sho
2020	Mick Fire	c	Haneda Hai, Tokyo Derby, Japan Dirt Derby
2022	Meisho Hachiro	c	Mile Championship Nambu Hai, JBC Sprint

== Races ==
Finish	Race	Distance	Track	Condition
2nd	Allowance	Seven Furlongs	Santa Anita Park	Fast
4th	Windy Sands Handicap	One Mile	Del Mar Racetrack	Fast
16th	Kentucky Derby	One and a Quarter Miles (Dirt)	Churchill Downs	Fast
1st	Blue Grass Stakes	One and One-Eighth Miles	Keeneland Race Course	Fast
2nd	California Derby	One and One-Sixteenth Miles	Golden Gate Fields	Fast
6th	San Vicente Stakes	Seven Furlongs	Santa Anita Park	Fast
1st	Maiden Claiming	Five and One-Half Furlongs	Santa Anita Park	Fast
5th	Maiden	Five and One-Half Furlongs	Santa Anita Park	Wet Fast

== Pedigree ==
Pedigree of Sinister Minister
Sire Old Trieste 1995 ch.	A.P. Indy; 1989 dk.b.	Seattle Slew	Bold Reasoning
Sire Old Trieste 1995 ch.	A.P. Indy; 1989 dk.b.	Seattle Slew	My Charmer
Sire Old Trieste 1995 ch.	A.P. Indy; 1989 dk.b.	Weekend Surprise	Secretariat
Sire Old Trieste 1995 ch.	A.P. Indy; 1989 dk.b.	Weekend Surprise	Lassie Dear
Sire Old Trieste 1995 ch.	Lovlier Linda; 1980 ch.	Vigors	Grey Dawn
Sire Old Trieste 1995 ch.	Lovlier Linda; 1980 ch.	Vigors	Relifordie
Sire Old Trieste 1995 ch.	Lovlier Linda; 1980 ch.	Linda Summers	Crozier
Sire Old Trieste 1995 ch.	Lovlier Linda; 1980 ch.	Linda Summers	Queenly Gift
Dam Sweet Minister 1997 b.	The Prime Minister; 1987 b.	Deputy Minister	Vice Regent
Dam Sweet Minister 1997 b.	The Prime Minister; 1987 b.	Deputy Minister	Mint Copy
Dam Sweet Minister 1997 b.	The Prime Minister; 1987 b.	Stick to Beauty	Illustrious
Dam Sweet Minister 1997 b.	The Prime Minister; 1987 b.	Stick to Beauty	Hail to Beauty
Dam Sweet Minister 1997 b.	Sweet Blue; 1985 dk.b.	Hurry Up Blue	Mr. Leader
Dam Sweet Minister 1997 b.	Sweet Blue; 1985 dk.b.	Hurry Up Blue	Blue Baroness
Dam Sweet Minister 1997 b.	Sweet Blue; 1985 dk.b.	Sugar Gold	Mr. Prospector
Dam Sweet Minister 1997 b.	Sweet Blue; 1985 dk.b.	Sugar Gold	Miss Ironside
