= Pure Grain =

British-bred Thoroughbred racehorse

- Sire: Polish Precedent
- Grandsire: Danzig
- Dam: Mill Line
- Damsire: Mill Reef
- Sex: Mare
- Foaled: 23 February 1992
- Country: United Kingdom
- Colour: Bay
- Breeder: W & R Barnett Ltd
- Owner: Robert Barnett
- Trainer: Michael Stoute
- Record: 11: 5-1-2
- Earnings: £277,625

Major wins
- Prestige Stakes (1994); Musidora Stakes (1995); Irish Oaks (1995); Yorkshire Oaks (1995)

Pure Grain (23 February 1992 – 18 September 2014) was a British Thoroughbred racehorse and broodmare. In 1994 she won two of her five races including the Prestige Stakes as well as finishing third in the Princess Margaret Stakes and fourth when favourite for the Fillies' Mile. In the following year she emerged as one of the best middle distance fillies of her generation in Europe with wins in the Musidora Stakes, Irish Oaks and Yorkshire Oaks. She also finished third in The Oaks and fifth in the Prix de l'Arc de Triomphe. After her retirement from racing she had some success as a dam of winners.

== Background ==
Pure Grain was a dark bay or brown mare with a white star bred by William and Robert Barnett. She was sired by Polish Precedent, a lightly-raced horse who won the Prix Jacques Le Marois and the Prix du Moulin in 1989 before sustaining his only defeat when finishing second to Zilzal in the Queen Elizabeth II Stakes. He later became a very successful breeding stallion, siring Pilsudski, Rakti, Darsi, Court Masterpiece and Polish Summer (Dubai Sheema Classic). Pure Grain's dam Mill Line was a daughter of the Barnetts' racemare Quay Line, who won the Park Hill Stakes in 1979.

The filly was sent into training with Michael Stoute at his Freemason Lodge Stable in Newmarket, Suffolk. She was ridden in all of her races by John Reid.

== Racing career ==
=== 1994: two-year-old season ===
Pure Grain made her racecourse debut in a six furlong maiden race at Windsor Racecourse on 27 June and finished second of the five runners, beaten three and a half lengths by the favourite Brief Glimpse. Eighteen days later she started 5/6 favourite for a seven furlong maiden at Newmarket and recorded her first success, accelerating clear of her opponents in the closing stages to win by two and a half lengths from Poppy Carew. The filly was then moved up in class, but down in distance, for the Group Three Princess Margaret Stakes over six furlongs at Ascot Racecourse on 23 July and finished third behind Tajannub and Maid For Walking.

Pure Grain faced Tajannub, Maid For Walking and Poppy Carew as well as the Sweet Solera Stakes runner-up The Jotter, when she started 2/1 second favourite for the Group Three Prestige Stakes at Goodwood Racecourse on 26 August. After being restrained by Reid in the early stages she began to make progress in the last quarter mile, took the lead a furlong out, and won by one and a quarter lengths from Poppy Carew with the favoured Tajannub in third. On her final appearance as a juvenile Pure Grain was stepped up in class and distance for the Group One Fillies' Mile at Ascot on 24 September. She was made the 2/1 favourite against eight opponents but after turning into the straight in sixth she never looked likely to win and finished fourth behind Aqaarid, Jural and Snowtown.

=== 1995: three-year-old season ===
Pure Grain began her second season in the Group Three Musidora Stakes (a major trial race for The Oaks) over ten and a half furlongs at York Racecourse on 16 May. She started favourite in a five-runner field which also included the Pretty Polly Stakes winner Musetta and the Rockfel Stakes winner Germane. She went to the front two furlongs out and held off the persistent challenge of the Richard Hannon-trained Caramba to win by a length, with a gap of eight lengths back to Musetta in third. The runner-up went on to win both the Falmouth Stakes and the Nassau Stakes.

On 9 June at Epsom Downs Racecourse Pure Grain started the 7/2 third favourite behind Aqaarid and Moonshell in the Oaks. After being held up by Reid she turned into the straight and fifth place and made steady progress to finish third behind Moonshell and the Stoute stable's other runner Dance A Dream. The filly was then sent to Ireland for the Irish Oaks at the Curragh on 16 July. The previously undefeated Larrocha (Ballymacoll Stud Stakes) started favourite ahead of the French-trained Valley of Gold (Prix Cléopâtre, Oaks d'Italia) with Pure Grain third in the betting on 9/2. The other runners included Musetta, Asterita (Lingfield Oaks Trial) and Russian Snows (runner up in the Pretty Polly Stakes). Pure Grain was always towards the front of the ten runner field and turned into the straight in third place behind Musetta and Larrocha. She took the lead approaching the last quarter mile and drew away from her rivals in the closing stages to win by six lengths from Russian Snows, with a further four lengths back to Valley of Gold in third. When Robert Barnett was asked by journalists about his plans for the filly he said "I pick the trainers, they pick the races".

In the Yorkshire Oaks at York on 16 August Pure Grain started 11/10 favourite in an eight-runner field. Her opponents were Wind In Her Hair (Aral-Pokal, runner-up in the 1994 Epsom Oaks), La Confederation (Sun Chariot Stakes), Phantom Gold (Ribblesdale Stakes), Dance A Dream, Noble Rose (Galtres Stakes), Royal Ballerina (Premio Federico Tesio, Blandford Stakes) and Magical Retreat (Pretty Polly Stakes). Pure Grain fought Reid's attempts to restrain her in the early stages before settling behind the leader Magigal Retreat. She joined Magical Retreat three furlongs out and got the better of a sustained struggle with the 33/1 outsider to win by a head, with Wind In Her Hair two lengths back in third.

On 1 October, Pure Grain was sent to France to contest Europe's most prestigious weight-for-age race, the Prix de l'Arc de Triomphe over 2400 metres at Longchamp Racecourse. In a sixteen-runner field she started at odds of 8.7/1 and was always in contention before finishing fifth behind Lammtarra, Freedom Cry, Swain and Lando. On her final appearance the filly was sent to Japan for the Japan Cup at Tokyo Racecourse on 26 November and finished unplaced behind Lando.

== Breeding record ==
Pure Grain was retired from racing to become a broodmare. She produced at least nine foals and three winners:

- Goncharova, a bay filly, foaled in 1998, sired by Gone West. Won three races including the Prix Fille de l'Air.
- Grain of Gold, bay filly, 1999, by Mr. Prospector. Won one race.
- Neoclassic, bay colt, 2000, by Peintre Celebre. Unplaced on only start.
- Pure Spin, bay filly, 2001, by Machiavellian. Unraced.
- Grain of Truth, bay filly, 2003, by Gulch. Won two races.
- Never Kingdom, bay colt, 2004, by King's Best. Unraced.
- Pure Song, bay filly, 2005, by Singspiel. Failed to win in seven races, dam of Romsdal who finished third in The Derby and second in the St Leger.
- Dark Quest, bay filly, 2006, by Rainbow Quest. Failed to win in five races.
- Pure Line, bay filly, 2012, by Zamindar. Failed to win in six races.

She was retired from breeding duties after producing Pure Line and lived at Fair Winter Farm until her death on 18 September 2014.

== Pedigree ==
Pedigree of Pure Grain (GB), dark bay or brown mare, 1992
Sire Polish Precedent (USA) 1986	Danzig (USA); 1977	Northern Dancer	Nearctic
Sire Polish Precedent (USA) 1986	Danzig (USA); 1977	Northern Dancer	Natalma
Sire Polish Precedent (USA) 1986	Danzig (USA); 1977	Pas de Nom	Admiral's Voyage
Sire Polish Precedent (USA) 1986	Danzig (USA); 1977	Pas de Nom	Petitioner
Sire Polish Precedent (USA) 1986	Past Example (USA); 1976	Buckpasser	Tom Fool
Sire Polish Precedent (USA) 1986	Past Example (USA); 1976	Buckpasser	Busanda
Sire Polish Precedent (USA) 1986	Past Example (USA); 1976	Bold Example	Bold Lad
Sire Polish Precedent (USA) 1986	Past Example (USA); 1976	Bold Example	Lady Be Good
Dam Mill Line (GB) 1985	Mill Reef (USA); 1968	Never Bend	Nasrullah
Dam Mill Line (GB) 1985	Mill Reef (USA); 1968	Never Bend	Lalun
Dam Mill Line (GB) 1985	Mill Reef (USA); 1968	Milan Mill	Princequillo
Dam Mill Line (GB) 1985	Mill Reef (USA); 1968	Milan Mill	Virginia Water
Dam Mill Line (GB) 1985	Quay Line (GB); 1976	High Line	High Hat
Dam Mill Line (GB) 1985	Quay Line (GB); 1976	High Line	Time Call
Dam Mill Line (GB) 1985	Quay Line (GB); 1976	Dark Finale	Javelot
Dam Mill Line (GB) 1985	Quay Line (GB); 1976	Dark Finale	Peeky (Family: 14-a)
