= Pride (horse) =

French-bred Thoroughbred racehorse

- Sire: Peintre Celebre
- Grandsire: Nureyev
- Dam: Specificity
- Damsire: Alleged
- Sex: Mare
- Foaled: 20 April 2000
- Country: France
- Colour: Bay
- Breeder: N P Bloodstock Ltd
- Owner: N P Bloodstock
- Trainer: John E. Hammond; Gerard Butler; Alain de Royer-Dupré
- Record: 25: 9-5-4
- Earnings: £2,191,923

Major wins
- Prix Allez France (2004); Prix du Conseil de Paris (2004); Prix Jean Romanet (2005); Prix Foy (2005); Prix Corrida (2006); Grand Prix de Saint-Cloud (2006); Champion Stakes (2006); Hong Kong Cup (2006)

Honours
- Pride Stakes at Newmarket Racecourse
- Last updated on 10 October 2015

Pride is a champion French racemare who won three Group 1 races. Her biggest success was the 2006 Hong Kong Cup. She was also an unlucky second in the Prix de l'Arc de Triomphe. Her other feature wins were the Champion Stakes and Grand Prix de Saint-Cloud. Her rating of 123 on the 2006 World Thoroughbred Racehorse Rankings made her the highest ranked mare in the world.

== Background ==
Sired by Peintre Celebre out of Specificity, she was first sent into training with John E. Hammond at Chantilly.
