= Court Masterpiece =

British-bred Thoroughbred racehorse

- Sire: Polish Precedent
- Grandsire: Danzig
- Dam: Easy Option
- Damsire: Prince Sabo
- Sex: Stallion
- Foaled: 12 May 2000
- Country: United Kingdom
- Colour: Bay
- Breeder: Gainsborough Stud
- Owner: Maktoum Al Makroum; Gainsborough Stud; Princess Haya of Jordan; Godolphin; QBE Insurance; Maxilead Limited
- Trainer: Ed Dunlop; Ismail Mohammed; Saeed bin Suroor; John Quinn
- Record: 40: 7-6-9
- Earnings: £741,945

Major wins
- Thoroughbred Stakes (2003); International Stakes Handicap (2004); On The House Stakes (2005); Lennox Stakes (2005); Prix de la Forêt (2005); Sussex Stakes (2006)

Awards
- Timeform rating 127 (2006)

Court Masterpiece (foaled 12 May 2000) is a British Thoroughbred racehorse and sire. He showed promise and consistency in his early career, winning a competitive maiden race as a juvenile, winning the Listed Thoroughbred Stakes as a three-year-old and taking a valuable handicap race at Ascot Racecourse in 2004. He emerged as a top-class performer over seven furlongs and one mile as a five-year-old when he won the Lennox Stakes in England and the Prix de la Forêt in France. In 2006 he recorded his biggest victory when he won the Sussex Stakes at Goodwood Racecourse, a track at which he had an exceptional record. Apart from his wins, he was placed in many important races including the Queen Elizabeth II Stakes, Queen Anne Stakes and the Celebration Mile. He was retired to stud in 2008 but proved to be sub-fertile. After returning to racing with little success and was retired again at the end of 2009.

== Background ==
Court Masterpiece is a bay horse bred by Gainsborough Stud, the breeding operation of his owner Maktoum Al Makroum. He was sired by Polish Precedent, a lightly-raced horse who won the Prix Jacques Le Marois and the Prix du Moulin in 1989 before sustaining his only defeat when finishing second to Zilzal in the Queen Elizabeth II Stakes. He later became a very successful breeding stallion, siring Pilsudski, Rakti, Darsi, Pure Grain and Polish Summer (Dubai Sheema Classic). Court Masterpiece's dam Easy Option was a high-class sprinter who won the Listed St Hugh's Stakes and finished fourth in two editions of the Prix de l'Abbaye. She was a half-sister to Wanton, the dam of the Irish 1000 Guineas winner Classic Park. As a broodmare Easy Option also produced the Prix de Saint-Georges winner Maybe Forever.

Court Masterpiece was sent into training with Ed Dunlop at Newmarket, Suffolk.

== Racing career ==
=== 2002–2004: early career ===
On his racecourse debut Court Masterpiece finished sixth in a seven furlong maiden race at Ascot Racecourse on 26 July 2002. On his only other start of the season he started 5/2 second favourite for the Convivial Maiden Stakes at York Racecourse in August and finished strongly to win by a short head from the Barry Hills-trained Arctic Burst. The photo-finish was so close that several of Arctic Burst's supporters attempted to confront the racecourse judge and harangued a Jockey Club spokesman, whilst Hills considered an appeal.

After finishing fourth at Newbury on his debut as a three-year-old, Court Masterpiece finished second in a handicap race at Epsom and third in the Britannia Stakes at Royal Ascot before finishing unplaced in the Bunbury Cup in July. On 2 August he was moved up to Listed class for the Thoroughbred Stakes over one mile at Goodwood in which he was ridden by Johnny Murtagh and started the 5/1 third favourite behind the Craven Stakes winner Hurricane Alan and the Michael Stoute-trained Laidlow. After being restrained towards the rear of the field in the early stages he took the lead inside the final furlong and won by a length from Hurricane Alan.

Court Masterpiece was off the course for more than nine months before returning to finish third at Goodwood in May 2004. He went on to finish fifth in the John of Gaunt Stakes, fourth behind Vortex in the Criterion Stakes and second in the Bunbury Cup. On 24 July, the colt was assigned a weight of 128 pounds for the International Stakes, a valuable handicap race over seven furlongs at Ascot. He was ridden by Kieren Fallon and started 7/1 second favourite in a twenty-one runner field with Vortex (carrying 121) heading the market on 4/1. He was held up by Fallon in the first quarter mile before moving up to track the leaders approaching the final furlong. He took the lead 150 yards from the finish and won by a neck from Polar Way. He was moved back to Group races for his last three starts of the season, finishing fourth in Celebration Mile, third in the Park Stakes and sixth in the Supreme Stakes.

=== 2005: five-year-old season ===
Court Masterpiece began his fourth season by finishing fourth under top weight of 136 pounds in the Victoria Cup and then finished second when 8/13 favourite for a minor event at Leicester Racecourse. On 3 June the horse started 13/8 favourite for the Listed On The House Stakes over one mile at Goodwood. Ridden by Fallon, he took the lead approaching the final furlong and drew away to win "very easily" by nine lengths from the three-year-old Elliots World.

Three weeks after his win at Goodwood, Court Masterpiece was beaten a short head by his old rival Vortex in the Criterion Stakes, before finishing a neck behind Autumn Glory in the Silver Trophy Stakes with Vortex in third. On 26 July, the horse faced Autumn Glory and Vortex again in the Group Two Betfair Cup over seven furlongs at Goodwood in which he was ridden for the first time by Philip Robinson. Starting at odds of 4/1, he tracked the leaders, overtook the four-year-old Jack Sullivan inside the final furlong and held off the renewed challenge of his rival to win by a short head with a gap of three lengths back to Majors Cast in third. After the race Robinson said "I'm thrilled for the horse, he's been placed in so many group races and finally managed to win one".

On 28 August Court Masterpiece finished third behind Chic and Majors Cast in the Celebration Mile and then ran third again, beaten a short head and three lengths by Iffraaj and Sleeping Indian when carrying top weight of 130 pounds in the Park Stakes at Doncaster eleven days later. On 5 October, on his twenty-fourth start, the horse contested his first Group One race when he was sent to France for the Prix de la Forêt over 1400 metres at Longchamp Racecourse. The British-trained sprinter Somnus started favourite ahead of Iffraaj and the Irish four-year-old Caradak (Desmond Stakes, Minstrel Stakes), with Court Masterpiece next in the betting on 8/1. The other runners included Coupe de Champe (Prix de la Porte Maillot, Prix du Pin) and Toupie (Prix d'Arenberg). Ridden by the French jockey Gerald Mosse he was held up in the early stages and reached the final turn before making rapid progress down the centre of the Longchamp straight. He caught Caradak in the final strides and won by a head with Mirabilis a short neck away in third.

On his final appearance of the season, Court Masterpiece started at odds of 14/1 for the Hong Kong Mile at Sha Tin Racecourse on 11 December and finished fifth of the thirteen runners behind the Japanese four-year-old Hat Trick.

=== 2006: six-year-old season ===
Following the death of Maktoum Al Maktoum in January 2006 Court Masterpiece raced in the ownership of the Gainsborough Stud. He began 2006 in the United Arab Emirates where he finished sixth in the Godolphin Mile in March. On his return to Europe he contested the Group One Lockinge Stakes at Newbury on 20 May and finished third behind Peeress and Majors Cast. At Royal Ascot in June he started third favourite behind Peeress and Proclamation for the Queen Anne Stakes, which also attracted Vortex and the Aidan O'Brien-trained Ad Valorem. Ridden by Jamie Spencer, he was hampered when making a strong challenge in the straight and finished second, one and a half lengths behind Ad Valorem. Spencer felt that the interference had cost his mount the race, but the racecourse stewards left the result unchanged.

On 2 August, Court Masterpiece was one of seven horses to contest the Group One Sussex Stakes over one mile at Goodwood in which he was ridden by Jimmy Fortune. Araafa, a three-year-old colt who had won the Irish 2000 Guineas and the St James's Palace Stakes on his last two starts was made favourite ahead of the outstanding racemare Soviet Song and the Summer Mile Stakes winner Echo of Light with Court Masterpiece fourth choice on 15/2. The other runners were Aussie Rules (Poule d'Essai des Poulains), Rob Roy (Joel Stakes) and the 100/1 outsider Vanderlin (Play the King Stakes). Fortune held the horse in fifth place as Echo of Light set the pace from Araafa before making progress approaching the last quarter mile. Araafa took the lead but Fortune switched Court Masterpiece to the inside, overtook the favourite a furlong out and opened up clear advantage. He won by two lengths from Soviet Song, with Rob Roy half a length away in third place. Commenting on the horse's fourth win at the track, Ed Dunlop said "He was very unlucky at Ascot when nearly knocked over, but that's history and he's now one of the best milers in Europe" and added "he's very good round here, and he's won like a very good horse. I'm very pleased for him. I would like to take him to America for the Breeders' Cup Mile, he would be a companion for Ouija Board (horse), but we'll take him home and have a think".

On his next appearance, Court Masterpiece finished third to George Washington and Araafa in the Queen Elizabeth II Stakes at Ascot on 22 September. In late autumn he was sent to race in Japan but failed to reproduce his best European form, finishing unplaced in the Mile Championship and the Hanshin Cup.

=== 2007–2009: later career ===
In 2007, Court Masterpiece entered the ownership of Princess Haya of Jordan, the wife of Sheikh Mohammed and was trained first by Ismail Mohammed and then by Saeed bin Suroor. He raced twice in Dubai without success, finishing eighth in the Al Fahidi Fort in February and fifth behind Spring At Last in the Godolphin Mile.

After an initial failure at stud, Court Masterpiece was acquired by the insurance company QBE (Europe) before entering the ownership of Maxilead Limited. He was returned to the track in 2009 when trained by John Quinn at Settrington in Yorkshire. He failed to win in six races, ending his career by finishing fourth in a claiming race at Musselburgh Racecourse in September.

== Assessment ==
The independent Timeform organisation gave Court Masterpiece a peak rating of 127 in September 2006, making him their seventh-best older horse, eight pounds behind the Japanese champion Deep Impact.

In the 2006 World Thoroughbred Racehorse Rankings, Court Masterpiece was given a rating of 119, making him the 44th best racehorse in the world.

== Stud record ==
Court Masterpiece was retired to stud at the end of the 2007 season and began his career as a breeding stallion at the Woodlands Stud in County Galway in 2008. The stud's owner Deidre Lusby explained that she "wanted a good Flat sire for the west of Ireland." The horse had serious fertility problems, produced very few foals and was returned to training.

In 2010 he returned to stud duty at the Norton Grove Stud at Malton, North Yorkshire. The stud's owner, Richard Lingwood, admitted "We're taking a bit of a gamble on Court Masterpiece to see if his fertility has improved. If any mare owners fancy taking a chance with him we'll be happy to talk to them, with the promise that if their mare is not tested in foal, we'll offer them a very good deal on one of our other stallions, either Bollin Eric or Monsieur Bond." Unfortunately, his fertility barely improved and only one of his offspring has appeared on a racecourse.

== Pedigree ==
Pedigree of Court Masterpiece (GB), bay stallion 2000
Sire Polish Precedent (USA) 1986	Danzig (USA); 1977	Northern Dancer	Nearctic
Sire Polish Precedent (USA) 1986	Danzig (USA); 1977	Northern Dancer	Natalma
Sire Polish Precedent (USA) 1986	Danzig (USA); 1977	Pas de Nom	Admiral's Voyage
Sire Polish Precedent (USA) 1986	Danzig (USA); 1977	Pas de Nom	Petitioner
Sire Polish Precedent (USA) 1986	Past Example (USA); 1976	Buckpasser	Tom Fool
Sire Polish Precedent (USA) 1986	Past Example (USA); 1976	Buckpasser	Busanda
Sire Polish Precedent (USA) 1986	Past Example (USA); 1976	Bold Example	Bold Lad
Sire Polish Precedent (USA) 1986	Past Example (USA); 1976	Bold Example	Lady Be Good
Dam Easy Option (IRE) 1992	Prince Sabo (GB); 1982	Young Generation	Balidar
Dam Easy Option (IRE) 1992	Prince Sabo (GB); 1982	Young Generation	Brig o' Doon
Dam Easy Option (IRE) 1992	Prince Sabo (GB); 1982	Jubilee Song	Song
Dam Easy Option (IRE) 1992	Prince Sabo (GB); 1982	Jubilee Song	Sylvanecte
Dam Easy Option (IRE) 1992	Brazen Faced (GB); 1975	Bold and Free	Bold Lad (IRE)
Dam Easy Option (IRE) 1992	Brazen Faced (GB); 1975	Bold and Free	Free and Easy
Dam Easy Option (IRE) 1992	Brazen Faced (GB); 1975	Maurine	Worden
Dam Easy Option (IRE) 1992	Brazen Faced (GB); 1975	Maurine	Muscida (Family: 1-u)
