= Discreet Cat =

American-bred Thoroughbred racehorse

- Sire: Forestry
- Grandsire: Storm Cat
- Dam: Pretty Discreet
- Damsire: Private Account
- Sex: Stallion
- Foaled: May 1, 2003
- Died: 25 May 2023 (aged 20)
- Country: United States
- Colour: Bay
- Breeder: E. Paul Robsham
- Owner: Joyce Robsham; Godolphin Stables
- Trainer: Stanley M. Hough; Saeed bin Suroor
- Record: 9: 6-0-2
- Earnings: US$1,554,180

Major wins
- Cigar Mile Handicap (2006); Jerome Breeders' Cup Handicap (2006); UAE Derby (2006)

Awards
- Timeform rating: 127; Co-World Champion 3-Year-Old (2006)
- Last updated on March 23, 2010

Discreet Cat (May 1, 2003 - May 25, 2023) was a thoroughbred race horse. As a foal of 2003 (May 1), the bay colt won the UAE Derby in March 2006. He was then shipped to the United States, but did not race in the Kentucky Derby or any other Triple Crown races.

== Connections ==
Discreet Cat is owned by Godolphin Stables. He was trained by Saeed bin Suroor and has been ridden by Javier Castellano, Frankie Dettori, and Garrett Gomez.

== Breeding ==
Bred in Kentucky by E. Paul Robsham, Discreet Cat was sired by Forestry (by Storm Cat) out of Grade I winner Pretty Discreet (by Private Account).

His career earnings stand at $1,554,180. His current stud fee is $30,000, he stands at Darley's Jonabell farm in Lexington, Ky.

== Dubai World Cup ==
On March 31, 2007, Discreet Cat ran in the Dubai World Cup against U.S. Horse of the Year Invasor. He suffered his first career loss in seven starts as Invasor would go on to win the race while Discreet Cat finished last in a field of seven.

Following his loss in the Dubai World Cup, Discreet Cat's handlers announced an abscess had been found in the horse's throat. He did not return to racing until September 30, 2007, when he finished third in the Vosburgh Stakes at New York's Belmont Park. His final race was a third-place finish in the inaugural Breeders' Cup Dirt Mile at Monmouth Park on October 26, 2007.

== Races ==
Finish	Race	Distance	Track	Condition
3rd	Breeders' Cup Dirt Mile	One Mile	Monmouth Park	Sloppy (sealed)
3rd	Vosburgh Stakes (Grade I)	6 Furlongs	Belmont Park	
7th	Dubai World Cup (Group 1)	2000 metres	Nad Al Sheba	Fast
1st	Cigar Mile Handicap (Grade I)	One Mile	Aqueduct Race Track	Good
1st	Jerome Breeders' Cup Handicap (Grade II)	One Mile	Belmont Park	Good
1st	Allowance	7 Furlongs	Saratoga	Fast
1st	UAE Derby (Group 2)	1800 metres	Nad Al Sheba	Fast
1st	Areej Trophy	1600 metres	Nad Al Sheba	
1st	Maiden	Six Furlongs	Saratoga Race Course	Fast

== Stud career ==
Discreet Cat stood as a stallion at Darley Stud in Japan from 2017.

Discreet Cat died in 2023.

=== Notable stock ===
Discreet Cat has currently sired four individual Group 1 winners:

c = colt, f = filly, g = gelding

Foaled	Name	Sex	Major Wins
2010	Dads Caps	c	Carter Handicap (2014,2015)
2010	Discreet Marq	f	Del Mar Oaks (2013)
2011	Secret Compass	f	Chandelier Stakes (2013)
2015	Secret Spice	f	Beholder Mile Stakes (2019)

In addition, Discreet Cat sired Obanburumai, who won the Golden Eagle in 2023.
