= Darsi (horse) =

French Thoroughbred racehorse

- Sire: Polish Precedent
- Grandsire: Danzig
- Dam: Darashandeh
- Damsire: Darshaan
- Sex: Stallion
- Foaled: 12 April 2003
- Country: France
- Colour: Bay
- Breeder: Aga Khan IV
- Owner: Aga Khan IV
- Trainer: Alain de Royer-Dupré
- Record: 6: 3-1-0
- Earnings: £636,883

Major wins
- Prix du Jockey Club (2006)

Darsi (foaled 12 April 2003) is a French Thoroughbred racehorse and sire best known for winning the 2006 Prix du Jockey Club. Owned and bred by the Aga Khan he was trained by Alain de Royer-Dupré and ridden by Christophe Soumillon in a racing career that comprised six races between September 2005 and July 2006. As a two-year-old, he showed some promise by finishing third on his debut and winning a minor race by six lengths. In the following spring, he finished second on his reappearance before winning the Prix de Courteuil and then recorded his biggest win when recording an upset victory in the Prix du Jockey Club. He was injured when running poorly in the Irish Derby (his only subsequent race) and was retired from racing to become a National Hunt breeding stallion in Ireland.

== Background ==
Darsi is a "big, imposing" bay horse standing 16.2 hands high bred in France by his owner the Aga Khan. He was sired by Polish Precedent, a lightly-raced horse who won the Prix Jacques Le Marois and the Prix du Moulin in 1989 before sustaining his only defeat when finishing second to Zilzal in the Queen Elizabeth II Stakes. He later became a very successful breeding stallion, siring Pilsudski, Rakti, Court Masterpiece (Prix de la Forêt, Sussex Stakes), Pure Grain (Irish Oaks, Yorkshire Oaks) and Polish Summer (Dubai Sheema Classic). Darsi's dam Darashandeh won one minor race, finished second in the Prix de Flore and fourth in the Prix Saint-Alary in 1997. She was a daughter of Daralinsha, a mare who won the Prix de Minerve in 1987 and was also the great-grandam of Darjina (Poule d'Essai des Poulains, Prix du Moulin).

Darsi was sent into training with Alain de Royer-Dupré at Chantilly and was ridden in all of his races by the Belgian jockey Christophe Soumillon.

== Racing career ==
=== 2005: two-year-old season ===
On his racecourse debut, Darsi contested the Prix de Villebon, for previously unraced colts and geldings over 1600 metres at Chantilly Racecourse on 16 September. Starting the 6/4 favourite against twelve opponents, he took the lead in the straight but faded in the closing stages to finish fifth behind the André Fabre-trained Gravitas. Four weeks later the colt was sent south for the Prix des Glaieuls over 1600 metres at Lyon-Parilly and started favourite against six opponents. He took the lead soon after the start, went clear of the field approaching the last 200 metres and won by six lengths from Pitcher.

=== 2006: three-year-old season ===
Darsi began his second season in the Prix de Ferrieres over 2200 metres at Longchamp Racecourse on 9 April. Starting the 5/4 favourite in a seven-runner field he took the lead from the start and maintained his advantage until the last 150 metres when he was overtaken and beaten one and a half lengths by Vison Celebre. On 2 May, Darsi started 3/5 favourite for the Prix de Courteuil over 2500 metres at Chantilly. He tracked the leaders before taking the lead 300 metres from the finish and won by two lengths from Puit d'Or with Estrela Borg two and a half lengths away in third place.

At Chantilly on 4 June, Darsi started a 14/1 outsider for the 169th running of the Prix du Jockey Club over 2100 metres (the distance had been shortened from 2400 metres in the previous year). The Irish-trained Aussie Rules was made favourite after winning the Poule d'Essai des Poulains three weeks earlier, whilst the other leading contenders included Olympian Odyssey (third behind George Washington and Sir Percy in the 2000 Guineas), Best Name (Prix François Mathet), Numide (Prix Hocquart), Art Deco (Dee Stakes), Barastraight (Prix La Force) and the undefeated Arras. Darsi raced in fifth place for most of the way before making a sustained run in the straight. He overtook the leader Arras 100 metres from the finish and won by three quarters of a length. Best Name finished strongly to take second place by a short neck from Arras, just ahead of Art Deco, Numide and Irish Wells. Soumillon, winning the race for the third time and celebrating his 25th birthday said "I had a dream of a race and just followed Arras for as long as possible. Then Darsi was very brave and courageous." He did, however, receive a four-day ban from the racecourse stewards for the misuse of his whip. The Aga Khan commented "We knew he was certain to stay and this victory has been a team effort. Darsi is a very good-looking horse, most consistent and has been gradually moved up in class. He was a late developer and Alain de Royer-Dupré has given him plenty of time."

Four weeks later, Darsi was sent to Ireland and started 5/1 second favourite for the Irish Derby over one and a half miles at the Curragh after his owner paid a €100,000 supplementary entry fee. Before the race, Alain de Royer-Dupré said that the horse had been working well, but expressed some concern about sending him abroad, as Darsi had never previously traveled on a plane. Darsi's chances were not helped when he unseated Soumillon on the way to the start. He raced in mid-division before making steady progress in the straight but never looked likely to win and finished fifth of the thirteen runners behind Dylan Thomas. He sustained a broken sesamoid bone in the race and did not run again. Announcing his retirement in October 2006, the Aga Khan's racing manager Georges Rimaud described him as "a brave and courageous horse who had both speed and stamina".

== Stud record ==
At the end of his racing career, Darsi was bought by a consortium of Irish breeders and retired to become a National Hunt breeding stallion at the Beechbrook Stud near Tinahely in County Wicklow. His early crops of foals yielded several minor winners.

== Pedigree ==
Pedigree of Darsi (FR), bay stallion 2003
| Sire Polish Precedent (USA) 1986 | Danzig (USA); 1977 | Northern Dancer | Nearctic |
| Sire Polish Precedent (USA) 1986 | Danzig (USA); 1977 | Northern Dancer | Natalma |
| Sire Polish Precedent (USA) 1986 | Danzig (USA); 1977 | Pas de Nom | Admiral's Voyage |
| Sire Polish Precedent (USA) 1986 | Danzig (USA); 1977 | Pas de Nom | Petitioner |
| Sire Polish Precedent (USA) 1986 | Past Example (USA); 1976 | Buckpasser | Tom Fool |
| Sire Polish Precedent (USA) 1986 | Past Example (USA); 1976 | Buckpasser | Busanda |
| Sire Polish Precedent (USA) 1986 | Past Example (USA); 1976 | Bold Example | Bold Lad |
| Sire Polish Precedent (USA) 1986 | Past Example (USA); 1976 | Bold Example | Lady Be Good |
| Dam Darashandeh (IRE) 1994 | Darshaan (GB); 1981 | Shirley Heights | Mill Reef |
| Dam Darashandeh (IRE) 1994 | Darshaan (GB); 1981 | Shirley Heights | Hardiemma |
| Dam Darashandeh (IRE) 1994 | Darshaan (GB); 1981 | Delsy | Abdos |
| Dam Darashandeh (IRE) 1994 | Darshaan (GB); 1981 | Delsy | Kelty |
| Dam Darashandeh (IRE) 1994 | Daralinsha (USA); 1984 | Empery | Vaguely Noble |
| Dam Darashandeh (IRE) 1994 | Daralinsha (USA); 1984 | Empery | Pamplona |
| Dam Darashandeh (IRE) 1994 | Daralinsha (USA); 1984 | Darazina | Labus |
| Dam Darashandeh (IRE) 1994 | Daralinsha (USA); 1984 | Darazina | Djebellina (Family: 1-e) |
