= Moonshell (horse) =

Irish-bred Thoroughbred racehorse

- Racing silks of Maktoum Al Maktoum
- Sire: Sadler's Wells
- Grandsire: Northern Dancer
- Dam: Moon Cactus
- Damsire: Kris
- Sex: Mare
- Foaled: 20 February 1992
- Country: Ireland
- Colour: Bay
- Breeder: Sheikh Mohammed
- Owner: Sheikh Mohammed; Godolphin
- Trainer: Henry Cecil; Hilal Ibrahim; Saeed bin Suroor
- Record: 5: 2-0-2
- Earnings: £173,495

Major wins
- Epsom Oaks (1995)

Honours
- Timeform rating: 117

Moonshell (20 February 1992 – 21 January 2006) was an Irish-bred Thoroughbred racehorse and broodmare best known for winning The Oaks in 1995. In a racing career which lasted from October 1994 to May 1996, the filly ran five times and won two races. After winning her only race as a two-year-old, Moonshell joined the Godolphin Racing team and spent the winter in Dubai. In the spring of 2005, she returned to England to finish third in the 1000 Guineas at Newmarket and then won the Classic Oaks over one and a half miles at Epsom. Moonshell did not run again as a three-year-old and was well beaten in two races in 1996 before being retired to stud.

== Background ==
Moonshell was a "lengthy, angular" bay mare with a white star, sired by the thirteen time Champion sire Sadler's Wells. Her dam Moon Cactus was a successful racehorse, winning the Sweet Solera Stakes, the Prestige Stakes and the Lupe Stakes as well as finishing second in the Prix de Diane. She made even more of an impact as a broodmare: apart from Moonshell, she produced the King George VI and Queen Elizabeth Stakes winner Doyen and Hatha Anna who won the Queen Elizabeth Stakes at Flemington. As a descendant of the broodmare Queen of Light, Moonshell was also related to the classic winners Royal Palace, Fairy Footsteps and Light Cavalry.

Moonshell was originally sent into training with Henry Cecil at his Warren Place stables at Newmarket.

== Racing career ==
=== 1994: two-year-old season ===
Moonshell did not run as a two-year-old until the late autumn of 1994 when she appeared in a one-mile maiden race at Doncaster on 21 October. Ridden by Willie Ryan, she took the lead approaching the final furlong and went clear of her opponents for a three-length win.

In the winter of 1994/5, Sheikh Mohammed transferred Moonshell to his Godolphin Racing team. The filly was removed from Cecil's stable and sent to Dubai, under the care of Hilal Ibrahim. The idea was that the warmer conditions allowed horses to develop more quickly, giving them an advantage in the early part of the European Flat-racing season. where her training was managed first by Hilal Ibrahim. The scheme was in its second year but had proved successful in 1994, when Balanchine was narrowly beaten in the 1000 Guineas before winning the Oaks and the Irish Derby.

=== 1995: three-year-old season ===
In the spring of 1995, the Godolphin horses returned to the organisation's British base at Newmarket, and her training was taken over by Saeed Bin Suroor. Like Balanchine a year earlier, Moonshell was sent straight for the 1000 Guineas without a trial race. She started joint second favourite at odds of 5/1, with her main opposition looking to come from Aqaarid (3/1) and Harayir (5/1), two fillies owned by Sheikh Mohammed's older brother Hamdan Al Maktoum. Ridden by Frankie Dettori Moonshell raced just behind the leaders and stayed on well in the closing stages to finish third to Harayir and Aqaarid, beaten just over two lengths.

At Epsom on 9 June, Moonshell started 3/1 second favourite for the Oaks, with Aqaarid being made the 6/4 favourite in a field of ten fillies. Moonshell was positioned just behind the leaders and turned into the straight in third place behind the outsiders Musetta and Dance A Dream. Moonshell moved to the front two furlongs from the finish and was ridden out by Dettori to win by one and a quarter lengths from Dance A Dream. Pure Grain, who went on to win the Irish Oaks and the Yorkshire Oaks, was three quarters of a length away in third, with Aqaarid well beaten in sixth. After the race, Dettori performed a flying dismount and praised the way that the filly had coped with the course and the occasion despite her lack of experience. According to the jockey, Moonshell showed "great courage" and was "an exceptional filly." Shortly after the race, Moonshell sustained a serious injury and did not race again in 1995.

At the end of the year, Moonshell was again sent to spend the winter in Dubai.

=== 1996: four-year-old season ===
On 25 February, she made her first appearance for more than eight months when she appeared in the Central Trading Company Mile on the dirt course at Nad Al Sheba Racecourse. She finished third of the four runners, beaten more than fifteen lengths by the winner, Airport. Moonshell was sent back to England for the 1996 turf season but made only one appearance when she started 6/1 second favourite for the Jockey Club Stakes at Newmarket on 3 May. After racing just behind the leaders, she weakened badly in the last three furlongs and was virtually pulled up by Dettori, finishing tailed-off last of the nine runners behind Riyadian. According to the independent Timeform organisation, Moonshell looked "a shadow" of the filly who won the Oaks, and she was immediately retired.

== Assessment and honours ==
In their book A Century of Champions, based on the Timeform rating system, John Randall and Tony Morris rated Moonshell a "poor" winner of the Oaks and the worst filly to win the race since 1967. Timeform gave Moonshell a rating of 117.

== Stud record ==
As a broodmare, Moonshell was sent to leading stallions including Rainbow Quest, Woodman and Seeking the Gold, but although she produced some minor winners, none of her foals succeeded at Group race level. Her daughter Forest Pearl never raced, but became a successful broodmare, producing the multiple Australian Group One winner Miss Finland. Moonshell died from a haemorrhage on 21 January 2006 when foaling a colt by Pivotal at the Woodpark Stud, County Meath, Ireland.

1998 Alunissage (USA) : Bay colt, foaled 10 February, by Rainbow Quest (USA) - won 1 race and placed 6 times from 13 starts in England and Dubai 2001-2006, including 3rd LR Fred Archer Stakes, Newmarket.

1999 Forest Pearl (USA) : Bay filly, foaled 7 March, by Woodman (USA) - unraced, dam of Miss Finland (AUS) winner of 6 races in Australia including G1Golden Slipper, Rosehill; G1 1000 Guineas, Caulfield; G1 Crown Oaks, Flemington; G1 Cadbury Guineas, Caulfield and G1 Arrowfield Stud Stakes, Rosehill.

2000 Moonsprite (GB) : Bay filly, foaled 7 April, by Seeking The Gold (USA) - won 2 races and placed twice from 6 starts in England 2002-3

2004 Lunar Storm (IRE) : Bay gelding, foaled 1 April, by Machiavellian (USA) - unplaced in 9 starts in England 2008-9

2006 Hatta Diamond (IRE) : Chesnut colt, foaled 21 January, by Pivotal (GB) - won 1 race and placed third once from 6 starts in England 2009

== Pedigree ==
Pedigree of Moonshell (IRE), bay mare, 1992
Sire Sadler's Wells	Northern Dancer	Nearctic	Nearco
Sire Sadler's Wells	Northern Dancer	Nearctic	Lady Angela
Sire Sadler's Wells	Northern Dancer	Natalma	Native Dancer
Sire Sadler's Wells	Northern Dancer	Natalma	Almahmoud
Sire Sadler's Wells	Fairy Bridge	Bold Reason	Hail To Reason
Sire Sadler's Wells	Fairy Bridge	Bold Reason	Lalun
Sire Sadler's Wells	Fairy Bridge	Special	Forli
Sire Sadler's Wells	Fairy Bridge	Special	Thong
Dam Moon Cactus	Kris	Sharpen Up	Atan
Dam Moon Cactus	Kris	Sharpen Up	Rocchetta
Dam Moon Cactus	Kris	Doubly Sure	Reliance
Dam Moon Cactus	Kris	Doubly Sure	Soft Angels
Dam Moon Cactus	Lady Moon	Mill Reef	Never Bend
Dam Moon Cactus	Lady Moon	Mill Reef	Milan Mill
Dam Moon Cactus	Lady Moon	Moonlight Night	Levmoss
Dam Moon Cactus	Lady Moon	Moonlight Night	Lovely Light (Family: 1-s)
