= 2007 World Thoroughbred Racehorse Rankings =

The 2007 World Thoroughbred Racehorse Rankings is the 2007 edition of the World Thoroughbred Racehorse Rankings. It is an assessment of racehorses which was issued by the International Federation of Horseracing Authorities (IFHA) in January 2008. It includes horses aged three or older which raced or were trained during 2007 in countries where the flat racing year runs from January 1 to December 31. These countries are generally in the Northern Hemisphere.

The ratings represent a weight value in pounds, with higher values given to horses which showed greater ability. It is judged that these weights would equalize the abilities of the horses if carried in a theoretical handicap race. The list includes all horses rated 115 or above, and it also shows the surface and the distances at which the rating was achieved.

The highest rating in the 2007 season was 131, which was given to the performance of Manduro in the Prince of Wales's Stakes. In total, 212 horses were included in the list, 32 more than in the 2006 Rankings.

== Full rankings for 2007 ==
- Country foaled – Horse names are followed by a suffix indicating the country where foaled.
- Age – The ages shown for horses foaled in the Northern Hemisphere are as of their universal date of increase, January 1, 2007. The ages of horses born in the Southern Hemisphere are taken from their equivalent date, August 1, 2007.
- Sex – The following abbreviations are used:
  - C – Colt – Ungelded male horse up to four-years-old.
  - F – Filly – Female horse up to four-years-old.
  - H – Horse – Ungelded male horse over four-years-old.
  - M – Mare – Female horse over four-years-old.
  - G – Gelding – Gelded male horse of any age.

Rank	Rating	Horse	Age	Sex	Trained	Surface	Distance (m)
1	131	Manduro (GER)	5	H	France	Turf	2,000
2	129	Authorized (IRE)	3	C	Great Britain	Turf	2,080 / 2,400
2	129	Curlin (USA)	3	C	United States	Dirt	2,000
2	129	Dylan Thomas (IRE)	4	C	Ireland	Turf	2,400
2	129	Invasor (ARG)	4	C	United States	Dirt	2,000
6	126	Street Sense (USA)	3	C	United States	Dirt	2,000
7	125	Admire Moon (JPN)	4	C	Japan	Turf	1,777
7	125	English Channel (USA)	5	H	United States	Turf	2,400
7	125	Soldier of Fortune (IRE)	3	C	Ireland	Turf	2,400
10	124	Any Given Saturday (USA)	3	C	United States	Dirt	1,800
10	124	Lawyer Ron (USA)	4	C	United States	Dirt	1,800
10	124	Youmzain (IRE)	4	C	Great Britain	Turf	2,400
13	123	Literato (FR)	3	C	France	Turf	2,000
13	123	Notnowcato (GB)	5	H	Great Britain	Turf	2,100
13	123	Rags to Riches (USA)	3	F	United States	Dirt	1,800 / 2,400
13	123	Ramonti (FR)	5	H	Great Britain	Turf	1,600
17	122	Darjina (FR)	3	F	France	Turf	1,600
17	122	Eagle Mountain (GB)	3	C	Ireland	Turf	2,000
17	122	Excellent Art (GB)	3	C	Ireland	Turf	1,600
17	122	Getaway (GER)	4	C	France	Turf	2,400
17	122	Hard Spun (USA)	3	C	United States	Dirt	1,800 / 2,000
17	122	Kip Deville (USA)	4	C	United States	Turf	1,600
17	122	Lava Man (USA)	6	G	United States	Dirt / Turf	2,000
17	122	Meisho Samson (JPN)	4	C	Japan	Turf	2,000 / 2,400
17	122	Peeping Fawn (USA)	3	F	Ireland	Turf	1,950 / 2,400
17	122	Pop Rock (JPN)	6	H	Japan	Turf	2,400
17	122	Sagara (USA)	3	C	France	Turf	2,400
17	122	Septimus (IRE)	4	C	Ireland	Turf	3,600
29	121	Daiwa Major (JPN)	6	H	Japan	Turf	1,600
29	121	Indian Ink (IRE)	3	F	Great Britain	Turf	1,600
29	121	Matsurida Gogh (JPN)	4	C	Japan	Turf	2,500
29	121	Midnight Lute (USA)	4	C	United States	Dirt	1,200
29	121	Yeats (IRE)	6	H	Ireland	Turf	2,800
34	120	Cesare (GB)	6	G	Great Britain	Turf	1,600
34	120	Cockney Rebel (IRE)	3	C	Great Britain	Turf	1,600
34	120	Corinthian (USA)	4	C	United States	Dirt	1,600
34	120	Duke of Marmalade (IRE)	3	C	Ireland	Turf	1,600 / 2,000
34	120	Fabulous Strike (USA)	4	G	United States	Dirt	1,200
34	120	Grasshopper (USA)	3	C	United States	Dirt	2,000
34	120	Lawman (FR)	3	C	France	Turf	1,600
34	120	Miss Andretti (AUS)	6	M	Australia	Turf	1,000
34	120	Red Rocks (IRE)	4	C	Great Britain	Turf	2,000
34	120	Sakhee's Secret (GB)	3	C	Great Britain	Turf	1,200
34	120	Scorpion (IRE)	5	H	Ireland	Turf	2,400 / 2,800
45	119	Adlerflug (GER)	3	C	Germany	Turf	2,400
45	119	After Market (USA)	4	C	United States	Turf	1,600 / 1,800 / 2,000
45	119	Ask (GB)	4	C	Great Britain	Turf	2,400
45	119	Benbaun (IRE)	6	G	Great Britain	Turf	1,000
45	119	Better Talk Now (USA)	8	G	United States	Turf	2,000 / 2,200
45	119	Cloudy's Knight (USA)	7	G	United States	Turf	2,400
45	119	Doctor Dino (FR)	5	H	France	Turf	2,400
45	119	Finsceal Beo (IRE)	3	F	Ireland	Turf	1,600
45	119	George Washington (IRE)	4	C	Ireland	Turf	1,600 / 2,000
45	119	Kongo Rikishio (IRE)	5	H	Japan	Turf	1,600
45	119	Mountain High (IRE)	5	H	Great Britain	Turf	2,400
45	119	Quijano (GER)	5	G	Germany	Turf	2,400
45	119	Saddex (GB)	4	C	Germany	Turf	2,400
45	119	Sixties Icon (GB)	4	C	Great Britain	Turf	2,400
45	119	The Tin Man (USA)	9	G	United States	Turf	1,800
60	118	Astronomer Royal (USA)	3	C	Ireland	Turf	1,600
60	118	Creachadoir (IRE)	3	C	Ireland / GB	Turf	1,600
60	118	Delta Blues (JPN)	6	H	Japan	Turf	2,400
60	118	Dutch Art (GB)	3	C	Great Britain	Turf	1,200
60	118	Ginger Punch (USA)	4	F	United States	Dirt	1,800
60	118	Jambalaya (CAN)	5	G	Canada	Turf	2,000
60	118	Mandesha (FR)	4	F	France	Turf	1,950
60	118	Mrs Lindsay (USA)	3	F	France	Turf	2,400
60	118	Nobiz Like Shobiz (USA)	3	C	United States	Dirt / Turf	1,600 / 1,800
60	118	Showing Up (USA)	4	C	United States	Turf	1,600
60	118	Sky Conqueror (CAN)	5	H	Canada	Turf	2,400
60	118	Smokey Stover (USA)	4	G	United States	Dirt	1,300
60	118	Soldier Hollow (GB)	7	H	Germany	Turf	1,600 / 2,000
60	118	Soldier's Tale (USA)	6	H	Great Britain	Turf	1,200
60	118	Super Hornet (JPN)	4	C	Japan	Turf	1,600
60	118	Tiago (USA)	3	C	United States	Dirt	1,800 / 2,400
60	118	Toylsome (GB)	8	H	Germany	Turf	1,400
60	118	Vermilion (JPN)	5	H	Japan	Dirt	2,000 / 2,100
60	118	Zambezi Sun (GB)	3	C	France	Turf	2,400
79	117	Agnes Ark (JPN)	4	C	Japan	Turf	2,000
79	117	Asiatic Boy (ARG)	4	C	UAE	Turf	1,600
79	117	Chosan (JPN)	5	H	Japan	Turf	2,400
79	117	Distant Way (USA)	6	H	Italy	Turf	2,000
79	117	Einstein (BRZ)	5	H	United States	Turf	1,800
79	117	Geordieland (FR)	6	H	Great Britain	Turf	4,000
79	117	Holocene (USA)	3	C	France	Turf	1,600
79	117	Hystericalady (USA)	4	F	United States	Dirt	1,800
79	117	Irish Wells (FR)	4	C	France	Turf	2,500
79	117	Jeremy (USA)	4	C	Great Britain	Turf	1,600
79	117	Lahudood (GB)	4	F	United States	Turf	2,200
79	117	Light Shift (USA)	3	F	Great Britain	Turf	2,400
79	117	Linngari (IRE)	5	H	UAE / France	Turf	1,600
79	117	Maraahel (IRE)	6	H	Great Britain	Turf	2,400
79	117	Marchand d'Or (FR)	4	G	France	Turf	1,300
79	117	Political Force (USA)	4	C	United States	Dirt	1,600 / 2,000
79	117	Precious Kitten (USA)	4	F	United States	Turf	1,600
79	117	Price Tag (GB)	4	F	United States	Turf	1,800
79	117	Red Clubs (IRE)	4	C	Great Britain	Turf	1,200
79	117	Red Giant (USA)	3	C	United States	Turf	2,000
79	117	Remarkable News (VEN)	5	H	United States	Turf	1,600
79	117	Scat Daddy (USA)	3	C	United States	Dirt	1,800
79	117	Schiaparelli (GER)	4	C	Germany	Turf	2,400
79	117	Sir Percy (GB)	4	C	Great Britain	Turf	2,400
79	117	Spirito del Vento (FR)	4	G	France	Turf	1,600
79	117	Sunriver (USA)	4	C	United States	Turf	2,200 / 2,400
79	117	Surf Cat (USA)	5	H	United States	Dirt	1,400
79	117	Suzuka Phoenix (JPN)	5	H	Japan	Turf	1,600
79	117	Takeover Target (AUS)	8	G	Australia	Turf	1,200
79	117	Turtle Bowl (IRE)	5	H	France	Turf	1,600
79	117	Vadapolina (FR)	3	F	France	Turf	2,000
79	117	Vodka (JPN)	3	F	Japan	Turf	2,400
79	117	Yellowstone (IRE)	3	C	Ireland	Turf	2,000
112	116	Admire Fuji (JPN)	5	H	Japan	Turf	2,200
112	116	Bussoni (GER)	6	H	Germany	Turf	2,400
112	116	Company (JPN)	6	H	Japan	Turf	2,000
112	116	Cosmonaut (USA)	5	H	United States	Turf	1,600
112	116	Daaher (CAN)	3	C	United States	Dirt	1,600
112	116	Dandy Man (IRE)	4	C	Ireland	Turf	1,000
112	116	Dream Rush (USA)	3	F	United States	Dirt	1,400
112	116	Grand Couturier (GB)	4	C	United States	Turf	2,400
112	116	Greg's Gold (USA)	6	G	United States	Dirt	1,400
112	116	He's a Decoy (IRE)	3	C	Ireland	Turf	1,600
112	116	In Summation (USA)	4	C	United States	Dirt	1,400
112	116	Lady Joanne (USA)	3	F	United States	Dirt	2,000
112	116	Laverock (IRE)	5	H	UAE / GB	Turf	2,400
112	116	Lear's Princess (USA)	3	F	United States	Dirt	1,800
112	116	Majestic Roi (USA)	3	F	Great Britain	Turf	1,600
112	116	Molengao (BRZ)	6	H	United States	Dirt	1,700
112	116	My Typhoon (IRE)	5	M	United States	Turf	1,600 / 1,800
112	116	Nashoba's Key (USA)	4	F	United States	Dirt / Turf	1,700 / 2,000
112	116	Octave (USA)	3	F	United States	Dirt	1,800
112	116	Panty Raid (USA)	3	F	United States	Dirt	1,800
112	116	Papal Bull (GB)	4	C	Great Britain	Turf	2,200 / 2,400 / 2,650
112	116	Passager (FR)	4	G	France	Turf	1,600
112	116	Pressing (IRE)	4	C	Italy / GB	Turf	2,000 / 2,200
112	116	Prince Flori (GER)	4	C	Germany	Turf	2,200 / 2,400
112	116	Purim (USA)	5	H	United States	Turf	1,600
112	116	Racinger (FR)	4	C	France	Turf	1,600
112	116	Royal Highness (GER)	5	M	United States	Turf	1,900
112	116	Satwa Queen (FR)	5	M	France	Turf	2,000
112	116	Shadow Gate (JPN)	5	H	Japan	Turf	2,000
112	116	Sightseeing (USA)	3	C	United States	Dirt	1,800
112	116	Spring at Last (USA)	4	C	United States	Dirt	1,600
112	116	Stream of Gold (IRE)	6	G	United States	Turf	2,400
112	116	Student Council (USA)	5	H	United States	Dirt	2,000
112	116	Tough Tiz's Sis (USA)	3	F	United States	Dirt	1,700
112	116	Vital Equine (IRE)	3	C	Great Britain	Turf	1,600
112	116	Wait a While (USA)	4	F	United States	Turf	1,700
112	116	West Wind (GB)	3	F	France	Turf	2,400
149	115	Arson Squad (USA)	4	G	United States	Dirt	1,800
149	115	Asakusa Kings (JPN)	3	C	Japan	Turf	2,400 / 3,000
149	115	Asset (IRE)	4	G	Great Britain	Turf	1,200
149	115	Awesome Gem (USA)	4	G	United States	Dirt	1,700 / 1,800 / 2,000
149	115	Balance (USA)	4	F	United States	Dirt	1,800
149	115	Benny the Bull (USA)	4	C	United States	Dirt	1,200 / 1,400
149	115	Bit of Whimsy (USA)	3	F	United States	Turf	1,800
149	115	Blue Concorde (JPN)	7	H	Japan	Dirt	1,600
149	115	Boscobel (GB)	3	C	Great Britain	Turf	2,400
149	115	Buzzards Bay (USA)	5	H	United States	Dirt	1,800
149	115	C P West (USA)	3	C	United States	Dirt	1,900
149	115	Circular Quay (USA)	3	C	United States	Dirt	1,700
149	115	Citronnade (USA)	4	F	United States	Turf	1,800
149	115	Coastal Path (GB)	3	C	France	Turf	3,000
149	115	Daiwa Scarlet (JPN)	3	F	Japan	Turf	2,200 / 2,500
149	115	Daytona (IRE)	3	G	United States	Turf	1,800
149	115	Dominican (USA)	3	G	United States	Dirt	1,800
149	115	Dreaming of Anna (USA)	3	F	United States	Turf	1,800
149	115	Echelon (GB)	5	M	Great Britain	Turf	1,600
149	115	Echo of Light (GB)	5	H	Great Britain	Turf	1,789
149	115	Erimo Expire (JPN)	4	C	Japan	Turf	3,200
149	115	Field Rouge (JPN)	5	H	Japan	Dirt	2,100
149	115	Garnica (FR)	4	C	France	Turf	1,200
149	115	Golden Titus (IRE)	3	C	Italy	Turf	1,600
149	115	Halicarnassus (IRE)	3	C	Great Britain	Turf	2,200
149	115	Honey Ryder (USA)	6	M	United States	Turf	2,200
149	115	Honolulu (IRE)	3	C	Ireland	Turf	2,800
149	115	Idiot Proof (USA)	3	C	United States	Dirt	1,200
149	115	Inti Raimi (JPN)	5	H	Japan	Turf	2,400
149	115	Irridescence (SAF)	6	M	UAE	Turf	1,900
149	115	Kelly's Landing (USA)	6	G	United States	Dirt	1,200
149	115	Legerete (USA)	3	F	France	Turf	2,000
149	115	Lucarno (USA)	3	C	Great Britain	Turf	2,400 / 2,920
149	115	Magnus (AUS)	5	H	Australia	Turf	1,000
149	115	Master Command (USA)	5	H	United States	Dirt	1,800
149	115	Mi Emma (GER)	3	F	Germany	Turf	1,600
149	115	Miss Shop (USA)	4	F	United States	Dirt	2,000
149	115	Nannina (GB)	4	F	Great Britain	Turf	1,600
149	115	Oracle West (SAF)	6	G	UAE	Turf	2,400
149	115	Passage of Time (GB)	3	F	Great Britain	Turf	2,200 / 2,400
149	115	Poet Laureate (GB)	3	C	France	Turf	2,500
149	115	Promising Lead (GB)	3	F	Great Britain	Turf	2,000
149	115	Prospect Park (GB)	6	H	United States	Turf	2,400
149	115	Red Evie (IRE)	4	F	Great Britain	Turf	1,400
149	115	Red Rock Canyon (IRE)	3	C	Ireland	Turf	2,000
149	115	Roc de Cambes (NZ)	3	C	Japan	Turf	2,500
149	115	Rutherienne (USA)	3	F	United States	Turf	1,800
149	115	Sealy Hill (CAN)	3	F	Canada	Turf	2,000
149	115	Sergeant Cecil (GB)	8	G	Great Britain	Turf	2,800
149	115	Shakespeare (USA)	6	H	United States	Turf	1,600
149	115	Shamdinan (FR)	3	C	France / USA	Turf	2,000 / 2,100 / 2,400
149	115	Silent Name (JPN)	5	H	United States	Dirt / Turf	1,400 / 1,600
149	115	Silkwood (GB)	3	F	Great Britain	Turf	2,400
149	115	Silver Wagon (USA)	6	H	United States	Dirt	1,400
149	115	Stage Gift (IRE)	4	G	UAE / GB	Turf	2,080
149	115	Stormello (USA)	3	C	United States	Dirt	1,800
149	115	Sun Boat (USA)	5	H	United States	Dirt	1,800
149	115	Sunrise Bacchus (JPN)	5	H	Japan	Dirt	1,600
149	115	Take D'Tour (USA)	6	M	United States	Dirt	1,700
149	115	Tariq (GB)	3	C	Great Britain	Turf	1,400
149	115	Tashelka (FR)	3	F	France	Turf	2,000
149	115	Tokai Trick (JPN)	5	H	Japan	Turf	3,200
149	115	Unbridled Belle (USA)	4	F	United States	Dirt	1,800
149	115	Wanderin Boy (USA)	6	H	United States	Dirt	1,800

Certain horses may have also recorded a lesser rating over a distance different from that listed above. The IFHA publishes this information when the lower rating represents the overall top performance in a particular category. There were three such additional ratings for this season:

Rank	Rating	Horse	Age	Sex	Trained	Surface	Distance (m)
+	127	Curlin (USA)	3	C	United States	Dirt	2,400
+	126	Manduro (GER)	5	H	France	Turf	1,850
+	120	Hard Spun (USA)	3	C	United States	Dirt	1,400

== Top ranked horses ==
The tables below show the top ranked horses overall, the top fillies and mares, and the top three-year-olds in the 2007 Rankings. They also show the top performers in various subdivisions of each group, which are defined by the distances of races, and the surfaces on which they are run. The IFHA recognizes five distance categories — Sprint, Mile, Intermediate, Long and Extended — identified by the acronym "SMILE". These are framed as follows:

- Sprint: 1,000–1,300m (1,000–1,599m for races in Canada and the United States)
- Mile: 1,301–1,899m (1,600–1,899m for races in Canada and the United States)
- Intermediate: 1,900–2,100m
- Long: 2,101–2,700m
- Extended: 2,701m +

All Horses
	All Surfaces	Dirt	Turf
All Distances	131 – Manduro	129 – Curlin; 129 – Invasor	131 – Manduro
Sprint	121 – Midnight Lute	121 – Midnight Lute	120 – Miss Andretti; 120 – Sakhee's Secret
Mile	126 – Manduro	124 – Any Given Saturday; 124 – Lawyer Ron	126 – Manduro
Intermediate	131 – Manduro	129 – Curlin; 129 – Invasor	131 – Manduro
Long	129 – Authorized; 129 – Dylan Thomas	127 – Curlin	129 – Authorized; 129 – Dylan Thomas
Extended	122 – Septimus	not listed	122 – Septimus
Fillies and Mares
	All Surfaces	Dirt	Turf
All Distances	123 – Rags to Riches	123 – Rags to Riches	122 – Darjina; 122 – Peeping Fawn
Sprint	120 – Miss Andretti	116 – Dream Rush	120 – Miss Andretti
Mile	123 – Rags to Riches	123 – Rags to Riches	122 – Darjina
Intermediate	122 – Peeping Fawn	116 – Lady Joanne	122 – Peeping Fawn
Long	123 – Rags to Riches	123 – Rags to Riches	122 – Peeping Fawn
Extended	not listed	not listed	not listed
Three-Year-Olds
	All Surfaces	Dirt	Turf
All Distances	129 – Authorized; 129 – Curlin	129 – Curlin	129 – Authorized
Sprint	120 – Hard Spun; 120 – Sakhee's Secret	120 – Hard Spun	120 – Sakhee's Secret
Mile	124 – Any Given Saturday	124 – Any Given Saturday	122 – Darjina; 122 – Excellent Art
Intermediate	129 – Authorized; 129 – Curlin	129 – Curlin	129 – Authorized
Long	129 – Authorized	127 – Curlin	129 – Authorized
Extended	115 – Asakusa Kings; 115 – Coastal Path; 115 – Honolulu; 115 – Lucarno	not listed	115 – Asakusa Kings; 115 – Coastal Path; 115 – Honolulu; 115 – Lucarno
