= Creachadoir =

Irish-bred Thoroughbred racehorse

- Sire: King's Best
- Grandsire: Kingmambo
- Dam: Sadima
- Damsire: Sadler's Wells
- Sex: Stallion
- Foaled: 8 February 2004
- Country: Ireland
- Colour: Bay
- Breeder: Frank Dunne
- Owner: Jackie Bolger & Ray Corcoran; Godolphin
- Trainer: Jim Bolger; Saeed bin Suroor
- Record: 15: 4-3-2
- Earnings: £587,997

Major wins
- Leopardstown 2000 Guineas Trial (2007); Tetrarch Stakes (2007); Joel Stakes (2007); Lockinge Stakes (2008)

Creachadoir (8 February 2004–2023) was an Irish-bred Thoroughbred racehorse and sire. He was a specialist miler who won four of his fifteen races between May 2006 and March 2009. Originally trained in Ireland by Jim Bolger he showed promise without winning in two races as a juvenile in 2006. In the first half of 2007 he won the Leopardstown 2000 Guineas Trial and the Tetrarch Stakes and went on to finish second in both the Poule d'Essai des Poulains and the Irish 2,000 Guineas. He was then bought by Godolphin and won the Joel Stakes before being narrowly beaten in the Hong Kong Mile. In May 2008 he recorded his biggest success when he won the Group One Lockinge Stakes over one mile at Newbury Racecourse. He then suffered a serious leg injury and made only one subsequent appearance before being retired from racing in 2009. He has had limited success as a breeding stallion.

== Background ==
Creachadoir was a bay horse with a white star and white socks on his hind legs bred in Ireland by Frank Dunne. He was from the third crop of foals sired by King's Best who won the 2000 Guineas in 2000. His other progeny included Workforce, Proclamation, Eishin Flash (Tokyo Yushun, Tenno Sho), Sajjhaa (Dubai Duty Free Stakes) and King's Apostle (Prix Maurice de Gheest). Creachadoir's dam Sadima won a maiden race over ten furlongs at Roscommon Racecourse on her racecourse debut but failed to win in four subsequent starts. Her dam, Anima, was a half-sister to Pilsudski. Sadima herself was a successful broodmare, also producing Youmzain who finished second in three consecutive runnings of the Prix de l'Arc de Triomphe.

As a yearling in September 2005 Creachadoir was consigned to the Tattersalls Ireland sale and was bought for €83.000 by the trainer Jim Bolger. For most of his racing career Creachadoir was trained by Bolger in County Carlow and owned in partnership by Jackie Bolger and Ray Corcoran.

Creachadóir is an Irish word meaning predator.

== Racing career ==
=== 2006: two-year-old season ===
Creachadoir made his racecourse debut in a maiden race over six furlongs at the Curragh on 28 May. Ridden as in all of his early races by Kevin Manning he started at odds of 4/1 and finished third of the fourteen runners, a length behind the Aidan O'Brien-trained winner Eagle Mountain. Despite his defeat, the colt was then stepped up in class for the Group Two Railway Stakes over the same course and distance on 2 July and finished fourth behind Holy Roman Emperor, Drayton and Excellent Art.

=== 2007: three-year-old season ===
==== Spring & summer ====
Creachadoir was highly tried by European standards in the spring of 2007, running six times before the end of May. After finishing third in a maiden at the Curragh on 25 March he contested the Group Three 2000 Guineas Trial over the same distance at Leopardstown Racecourse two weeks later. The Aidan O'Brien-trained Admiralofthefleet (winner of the Royal Lodge Stakes) was made favourite with Creachadoir starting a 12/1 outsider in a nine runner. He raced in second before taking the lead entering the straight and accelerated clear of his rivals to win by three and a half lengths despite being eased down by Manning in the closing stages.

Two weeks later at the same track he was moved up in distance for the ten furlong Ballysax Stakes and finished fourth of the nine runners behind Mores Wells. On 7 May the colt was dropped back in distance for the Group Three Tetrarch Stakes over seven furlongs at the Curragh and started the 11/4 favourite against ten opponents. After chasing the leaders he took the lead in the final furlong and drew away to win "comfortably" by three lengths from the British-trained Mr Napper Tandy.

On 13 May, six days after his win at the Curragh, Creachadoir was moved up to Group One level as he was sent to France to contest the Poule d'Essai des Poulains over 1600 metres at Longchamp Racecourse. Starting at 6.5/1 in a fourteen-runner field he tracked the leaders before going to the front approaching the last 200 metres. He was overtaken in the closing stages and beaten half a length by the 33/1 outsider Astronomer Royal with Honoured Guest and Excellent Art in third and fourth. Less than two weeks later he started third favourite behind Cockney Rebel and Duke of Marmalade in the Irish 2,000 Guineas at the Curragh. After being sixth at half-way he made steady progress in the straight and finished second, beaten a length by Cockney Rebel. In June he was sent to England for the St James's Palace Stakes at Royal Ascot but failed to reproduce his best form and finished sixth of the eight runners behind Excellent Art.

==== Autumn ====
In the late summer of 2007 Creachadoir was sold privately to Sheikh Mohammed's Godolphin organisation and was transferred to the stable of Saeed bin Suroor. On his first appearance for his new owners the colt contested the Group Three Joel Stakes over one mile at Newmarket Racecourse on 6 October and started the 11/4 joint-favourite alongside the filly Tobosa. Ridden by Kerrin McEvoy he took the lead a furlong out and pulled away to win by three lengths from the 66/1 outsider Tell, despite hanging to the right in the closing stages. Two weeks later he was moved up in class and distance for the Champion Stakes over ten furlongs at the same track and finished fourth of the twelve runners behind the French colt Literato.

For his final appearance of the year, Creachadoir was sent to Hong Kong for the Hong Kong Mile at Sha Tin Racecourse and started an 18/1 outsider. Ridden as on his previous start by Frankie Dettori he made strong progress in the straight but failed by a short head to overhaul the local champion Good Ba Ba. The other beaten horses included Darjina, Excellent Art and Able One. Godolphin's Racing Manager Simon Crisford said "Creachadoir will be a lovely horse for next year and we might return here for the Champions Mile. He ran his race and the wide draw made no difference today. He has run a fantastic race."

=== 2008: four-year-old season ===
In the winter of 2007/ 2008 Creachadoir was trained at Godolphin's base in Dubai. On his seasonal debut he started 5/1 joint second favourite for the Dubai Duty Free Stakes over nine furlongs on turf at Nad Al Sheba Racecourse on 29 March. He never looked likely to win and finished eighth of the sixteen runners behind the South African outsider Jay Peg. On his return to Europe the colt was one of eleven horses to contest the Group One Lockinge Stakes over the straight mile course at Newbury Racecourse on 17 May. Rideen by Dettori he was made 3/1 favourite ahead of the seven-year-old gelding Cesare (Royal Hunt Cup, Summer Mile Stakes) whilst the other runners were Astronomer Royal, Haradasun, Majestic Roi, Phoenix Tower, Tariq (Lennox Stakes), Rob Roy (Sandown Mile), Al Qasi (Phoenix Sprint Stakes), Arabian Gleam (Park Stakes) and Barshiba (Sandringham Handicap). Creachadoir was amongst the leaders from the start and went to the front a quarter of a mile from the finish. From that point on he was "always in control" and won by three-quarters of a length and a neck from Phoenix Tower and Tariq. After the race Dettori said "His form is rock-solid and he is a force to be reckoned with this year. I had the box seat and managed to get some room at the two. I pressed go and he responded immediately... he was idling a bit in front".

Creachadoir was being prepared for a run in the Queen Anne Stakes at Royal Ascot when he broke his right foreleg in training and missed the rest of the season. Simon Crisford explained "The injury to his right-front cannon came to light when he cooled down after working very well yesterday. He's already had surgery and we'll make a decision on whether he races on next season in a few weeks' time".

=== 2009: five-year-old season ===
As in the previous year, Creachadoir spent the winter in Dubai and began his campaign in the Dubai Duty Free. On this occasion he started a 25/1 outsider and finished fifteenth of the sixteen runners behind Gladiatorus. He picked up another injury in the race and did not run again.

== Stud record ==
Creachadoir was retired to become a breeding stallion, starting his stud career in 2010. He has sired several minor winners on the flat but no top-class performers. He has had immediate success however as a sire of jumpers, with his son Footpad winning the Grade I Prix Alain du Breil. In 2016 he was standing at the Haras de Lonray in France at a fee of €2,000.

== Pedigree ==
Pedigree of Creachadoir (IRE), bay stallion, 2004
Sire King's Best (USA) 1997	Kingmambo (USA); 1990	Mr. Prospector	Raise a Native
Sire King's Best (USA) 1997	Kingmambo (USA); 1990	Mr. Prospector	Gold Digger
Sire King's Best (USA) 1997	Kingmambo (USA); 1990	Miesque	Nureyev
Sire King's Best (USA) 1997	Kingmambo (USA); 1990	Miesque	Pasadoble
Sire King's Best (USA) 1997	Allegretta (GB); 1978	Lombard	Agio
Sire King's Best (USA) 1997	Allegretta (GB); 1978	Lombard	Promised Lady
Sire King's Best (USA) 1997	Allegretta (GB); 1978	Anatevka	Espresso
Sire King's Best (USA) 1997	Allegretta (GB); 1978	Anatevka	Almyra
Dam Sadima (IRE) 1998	Sadler's Wells (USA); 1981	Northern Dancer	Nearctic
Dam Sadima (IRE) 1998	Sadler's Wells (USA); 1981	Northern Dancer	Natalma
Dam Sadima (IRE) 1998	Sadler's Wells (USA); 1981	Fairy Bridge	Bold Reason
Dam Sadima (IRE) 1998	Sadler's Wells (USA); 1981	Fairy Bridge	Special
Dam Sadima (IRE) 1998	Anima (GB); 1989	Ajdal	Northern Dancer
Dam Sadima (IRE) 1998	Anima (GB); 1989	Ajdal	Native Partner
Dam Sadima (IRE) 1998	Anima (GB); 1989	Cocotte	Troy
Dam Sadima (IRE) 1998	Anima (GB); 1989	Cocotte	Gay Milly (family: 11)

- Through his dam, Creachadoir was inbred 3 × 4 to Northern Dancer, meaning that this stallion appears in both the third and fourth generation of his pedigree.
