= Excellent Art =

British-bred Thoroughbred racehorse

- Sire: Pivotal
- Grandsire: Polar Falcon
- Dam: Obsessive
- Damsire: Seeking The Gold
- Sex: Stallion
- Foaled: 25 February 2004
- Country: United Kingdom
- Colour: Bay
- Breeder: Cheveley Park Stud
- Owner: Matthew Green; Smith, Magnier, Tabor & Green
- Trainer: Neville Callaghan; Aidan O'Brien
- Record: 11: 4-3-2
- Earnings: £630,196

Major wins
- National Stakes (2006); Mill Reef Stakes (2006); St James's Palace Stakes (2007)

Excellent Art (25 February 2004) was a British-bred Thoroughbred racehorse and sire. As a two-year-old he was trained in England and showed good form, winning the National Stakes and the Mill Reef Stakes and being placed in both the Prix Morny and the Railway Stakes. In the following year he was moved in Ireland and was even better: he won the St James's Palace Stakes, finished second in the Sussex Stakes, Queen Elizabeth II Stakes and Breeders' Cup Turf and was rated one of the best three-year-old colts in the world. He was then retired to stud and had some success as a sire of winners before being exported to India in 2013.

== Background ==
Excellent Art was a dark-coated bay horse with a white star and snip bred in England by the Newmarket-based Cheveley Park Stud. Her sire Pivotal was a top class sprinter who won the King's Stand Stakes and the Nunthorpe Stakes in 1996. He went on to become an "excellent" sire, getting the winners of more than a thousand races across a range of distances including Sariska, Somnus, Farhh, Kyllachy (Nunthorpe Stakes) and Immortal Verse. Excellent Art's dam Obsessive won one race and finished third in the Musidora Stakes. She was a third-generation descendant of Miss Carmie, a broodmare who was also the female-line ancestor of Chief's Crown, Special Duty and Winning Colors.

As a yearling, the colt was sent to the Doncaster sales in September 2005 where he was bought for 76,000 guineas by the trainer Neville Callagham. He entered the ownership of the art dealer Matthew Green and was trained by Callaghan in Newmarket, Suffolk.

== Racing career ==
=== 2006: two-year-old season ===
Excellent Art began his racing career in a five furlong maiden race at Newmarket Racecourse on 20 April 2006. Ridden by Frankie Dettori he started the 9/4 second favourite and won by one and a quarter lengths from the Barry Hills-trained Nittan's Spirit. Dettori was again in the saddle when the colt contested the Listed National Stakes over the same distance at Sandown Park Racecourse on 29 May. starting the odds-on favourite against three opponents, Excellent Art took the lead approaching the final furlong and drew away to win by nine lengths despite being eased down by Dettori in the closing stages. Callaghan described the winner was "a straightforward colt, who has a chance of being very good".

In July, Excellent Art was sent to Ireland and moved up in class and distance for the Group Two Railway Stakes over six furlongs at the Curragh. Ridden by Mick Kinane, he started the 11/8 favourite but after reaching second place in the straight but could make no further progress and finished third behind Holy Roman Emperor and Drayton. Dettori regained the ride when the colt was sent to Deauville Racecourse for the Group One Prix Morny on 20 August and started second favourite behind the Prix du Bois winner Sandwaki. Racing on heavy ground, he was amongst the leaders from the start before finishing third, beaten a length and a head by Dutch Art and the filly Magic America. On 16 September, ridden by Kerrin McEvoy, Excellent Art contested the Group Two Mill Reef Stakes at Newbury Racecourse. He started the 15/8 second favourite behind Doctor Brown, a colt who had defeated Cockney Rebel in a valuable sales race at York in August. Excellent Art tracked the leaders before taking the lead two furlongs out and held off a sustained challenge from Doctor Brown to win by a short head despite being hampered by the runner-up in the closing stages. Callaghan commented "He's not far off the best and today's race was a bit messy. I'm sure if he could ride the race again Kerrin would have gone on a bit earlier. Seven furlongs will suit him better".

In December 2006, a controlling share in Excellent Art was bought by the Coolmore Stud, and the colt was sent to Ireland to be trained by Aidan O'Brien at Ballydoyle. The purchase followed a visit to Callaghan's stable by Coolmore's bloodstock agent Dermot "Demi" O'Byrne, during which the trainer allegedly tried to hide the colt by ordering that he should be kept in his stable box.

=== 2007: three-year-old season ===
On his first appearance for his new connections Excellent Art was sent to France for the Poule d'Essai des Pouliches over 1600 metres at Longchamp Racecourse on 13 May and was ridden for the first time by Jamie Spencer. In a race dominated by Irish-trained colts, Excellent Art recovered after struggling to obtain a clear run in the straight and finished fourth behind Astronomer Royal, Creachadoir and Honoured Guest.

The 162nd running of the St James's Palace Stakes at Royal Ascot attracted a field of eight runners. Cockney Rebel the winner of the 2000 Guineas and Irish 2,000 Guineas, started even money favourite, whilst Excellent Art started at odds of 8/1. The other runners included Astronomer Royal, Creachadoir, Dutch Art, Duke of Marmalade and He's A Decoy. Excellent Art was held up at the back of the field by Spencer before making progress in the straight. He overtook Duke of Marmalade inside the final furlong and won by a neck, with Astronomer Royal taking third ahead of Dutch Art. The first three finishers were all trained by O'Brien. After the race, Spencer commented "In France I did what I felt what was best for the horse. I thought he would have won easily there had he got the gaps. Today he's proved it. I got settled lovely towards the rear. They didn't go quick and that was my only concern, but once he got the split a furlong down he was always going to win".

On his next appearance, the colt was matched against older horses for the first time in the Sussex Stakes at Goodwood and started 15/8 favourite ahead of the four-year-old Asiatic Boy and the five-year-old Ramonti. As at Ascot, he was restrained in the early stages before finishing strongly, but failed by a head to overhaul Ramonti. In September Excellent Art met Ramonti again and again started 15/8 favourite ahead of his older rival, with the other runners including Darjina and Duke of Marmalade. In a closely contested finish, he recovered after struggling to obtain a clear run and finished half a length behind Ramonti, just ahead of Duke of Marmalade and the six-year-old gelding Cesare. A month later he was sent to the United States for the Breeders' Cup Mile at Monmouth Park and started 2/1 favourite against twelve opponents. Ridden by Johnny Murtagh, he raced at the back of the field before moving up to sixth on the final turn. He was switched to the outside in the straight and made steady progress to finish second, a length behind the four-year-old Kip Deville. On his final appearance, the colt was sent to Sha Tin Racecourse contest the Hong Kong Mile on 9 December. He started second favourite but never looked likely to win and finished eighth of the thirteen runners behind the locally trained Good Ba Ba.

== Assessment ==
In the 2007 World Thoroughbred Racehorse Rankings Excellent Art was rated the seventeenth best racehorse in the world, and the best three-year-colt over one mile.

== Stud record ==
After his retirement from racing, Excellent Art became a breeding stallion at the Cheveley Park Stud. His best winners have included Graphic (Prix Messidor), Hazel Lavery (St Simon Stakes) and Lady Lara (Honey Fox Stakes).

In January 2013 was sold to continue his breeding career at the Poonawalla Stud in India.

== Pedigree ==
Pedigree of Excellent Art (GB), bay stallion, 2004
| Sire Pivotal (GB) 1993 | Polar Falcon (USA); 1987 | Nureyev | Northern Dancer |
| Sire Pivotal (GB) 1993 | Polar Falcon (USA); 1987 | Nureyev | Special |
| Sire Pivotal (GB) 1993 | Polar Falcon (USA); 1987 | Marie d'Argonne | Jefferson |
| Sire Pivotal (GB) 1993 | Polar Falcon (USA); 1987 | Marie d'Argonne | Mohair |
| Sire Pivotal (GB) 1993 | Fearless Revival (GB); 1987 | Cozzene | Caro |
| Sire Pivotal (GB) 1993 | Fearless Revival (GB); 1987 | Cozzene | Ride The Trails |
| Sire Pivotal (GB) 1993 | Fearless Revival (GB); 1987 | Stufida | Bustino |
| Sire Pivotal (GB) 1993 | Fearless Revival (GB); 1987 | Stufida | Zerbinetta |
| Dam Obsessive (USA) 1993 | Seeking The Gold (USA); 1985 | Mr. Prospector | Raise a Native |
| Dam Obsessive (USA) 1993 | Seeking The Gold (USA); 1985 | Mr. Prospector | Gold Digger |
| Dam Obsessive (USA) 1993 | Seeking The Gold (USA); 1985 | Con Game | Buckpasser |
| Dam Obsessive (USA) 1993 | Seeking The Gold (USA); 1985 | Con Game | Broadway |
| Dam Obsessive (USA) 1993 | Secret Obsession (USA); 1986 | Secretariat | Bold Ruler |
| Dam Obsessive (USA) 1993 | Secret Obsession (USA); 1986 | Secretariat | Somethingroyal |
| Dam Obsessive (USA) 1993 | Secret Obsession (USA); 1986 | Ann Stuart | Lyphard |
| Dam Obsessive (USA) 1993 | Secret Obsession (USA); 1986 | Ann Stuart | Miss Carmie (Family: 23-b) |
