= Duke of Marmalade =

Irish-bred Thoroughbred racehorse

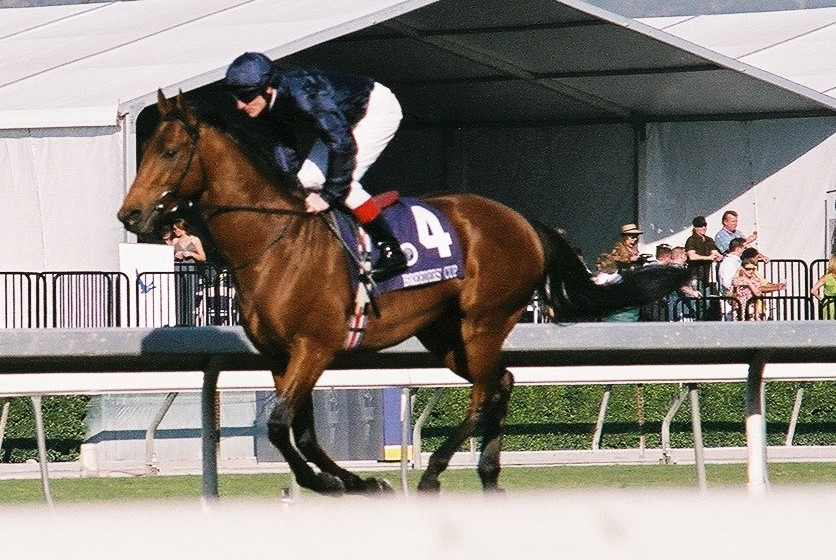
- Duke of Marmalade at the 2008 Breeders' Cup
- Sire: Danehill
- Grandsire: Danzig
- Dam: Love Me True
- Damsire: Kingmambo
- Sex: Stallion
- Foaled: 12 March 2004
- Died: 5 November 2021 (aged 17)
- Country: Ireland
- Colour: Bay
- Breeder: Southern Bloodstock
- Owner: Duke of Marmalade Syndicate
- Trainer: Aidan O'Brien
- Record: 16: 6-4-1
- Earnings: £1,388,453

Major wins
- Prix Ganay (2008); Tattersalls Gold Cup (2008); Prince of Wales's Stakes (2008); King George VI and Queen Elizabeth Stakes (2008); International Stakes (2008)

Awards
- European Champion Older Horse (2008)
- Last updated on November 18, 2008

Duke of Marmalade (12 March 2004 – 5 November 2021) was an Irish Thoroughbred racehorse and sire. He is best known for winning five consecutive Group One races in 2008, for which he was named European Champion Older Horse. Upon retirement at the end of the 2008 racing season he stood as a stallion for Coolmore Stud, being moved between stud farms in Ireland and Australia (a practice known as shuttling). In July 2014 he was sold and relocated to Drakenstein Stud in South Africa.

Duke of Marmalade was owned during his racing career by Sue Magnier and Michael Tabor, winning his first two races as a two-year-old in June 2006. He did not win again until the spring of his four-year-old season, almost twenty-two months later. During this winless period he was sometimes regarded as little more than a pacemaker for more celebrated stable companions such as Dylan Thomas. In his final year of racing he recorded wins in the Prix Ganay, the Tattersalls Gold Cup, the Prince of Wales's Stakes, the King George VI and Queen Elizabeth Stakes and International Stakes. He was retired in October 2008 after running in the Breeders' Cup Classic. Duke of Marmalade sired four European Classic winners in 2015, namely Nutan, Star of Seville, Simple Verse and Sound of Freedom.

== Background ==
Duke of Marmalade was a bay horse standing 16 hands high bred in Ireland by Southern Bloodstock. a division of his owners' Coolmore Stud organisation. Duke of Marmalade weighed 540 kg during his racing career and was trained by Aidan O'Brien at Ballydoyle.

Duke of Marmalade was one of the last crop of foals sired by Danehill one of the most successful stallions of the last twenty years, producing the winners of more than a thousand races, including one hundred and fifty-six at Group One/Grade I level. Among his best offspring are Dylan Thomas, Rock of Gibraltar, George Washington and North Light. Love Me True is a half-sister to Shuailaan (Winter Hill Stakes), Madison's Charm (Comely Stakes) and Bite The Bullet (Sanford Stakes), and, as a granddaughter of Lassie Dear, is closely related to Summer Squall, A.P. Indy and Lemon Drop Kid.

The name "Duke of Marmalade" is derived from a title created by King Henri Christophe for a member of the new Haitian nobility following the Haitian Revolution. The name had previously been used for an Italian thoroughbred racehorse which won the Premio Roma in 1975 and 1976.

== Racing career ==
=== 2006: two-year-old season ===
Duke of Marmalade began his career with three races in the summer of 2006. In June he made his debut in a six furlong maiden race at Leopardstown. Ridden by Seamie Heffernan and starting at odds of 11/4 (2.75-1) favourite, he was towards the back of the field in the early stages before making progress in the last two furlongs to finish second to Chanting. Nine days later he reappeared in a maiden race over seven furlongs at The Curragh for which he was made 4/6 favourite (approximately 0.67-1). He "stayed on well" to record his first win, beating Supposition by a neck (approximately a quarter of a length), under Kieren Fallon.

Duke of Marmalade was then moved directly into Group Two class; he was sent to England for the Vintage Stakes at Goodwood in July, where his opponents included the July Stakes winner Strategic Prince. Ridden by Michael Kinane he raced just behind the leaders before being moved forward to challenge the leaders in the straight. He made ground steadily, but was unable to reach the front and finished second, beaten by a neck by Strategic Prince. Before his run at Goodwood, Duke of Marmalade had been supported in the betting for the following year's 2000 Guineas, but shortly after the race he suffered a pastern injury which required surgery; as a result, he did not race again in 2006.

=== 2007: three-year-old season ===
Racing colours of Susan Magnier

In 2007 Duke of Marmalade did not record a victory in six starts. However, he was never further back than fourth and ran exclusively in Group One races. He was often part of a multiple entry by the Ballydoyle team. Instead of running in a trial race, Duke of Marmalade was sent straight to Newmarket for the 2000 Guineas. The field of twenty-four runners split into two groups, one on either side of the wide Newmarket course. Duke of Marmalade tracked the leaders of the stands side group before staying on to finish fourth to Cockney Rebel. Having returned from an absence of more than nine months, the colt was expected to improve for the run, but later in the same month he finished fourth again to Cockney Rebel in the Irish 2000 Guineas.

At Royal Ascot, Duke of Marmalade showed improved form in the St James's Palace Stakes. Michael Kinane tried to lead all the way on the colt-and was still in front inside the final furlong-before being caught and beaten a neck by Jamie Spencer on his stable companion Excellent Art, with another O'Brien-trained runner, Astronomer Royal in third, and Cockney Rebel in fifth. Two months later, Duke of Marmalade was moved up in distance and took on older horses for the first time in the International Stakes at York. He ran up to his best form in a highly competitive race to finish fourth behind the Derby winner Authorized, Dylan Thomas and Notnowcato.

Duke of Marmalade raced against his stable companion Dylan Thomas again in the Irish Champion Stakes at Leopardstown in September. He led into the straight before being overtaken by Dylan Thomas, and although he had no chance with the winner he stayed on to take second ahead of notable winners such as Red Rocks (Breeders' Cup Turf), Maraahel (Hardwicke Stakes) and Finsceal Beo (1000 Guineas). O'Brien was pleased with the run and said that Duke of Marmalade was still improving. On his final start of the year he was brought back to one mile for the Queen Elizabeth II Stakes in which he led until the last quarter mile, setting a strong pace, before finishing third to Ramonti and Excellent Art.

During the winter it was discovered that a metal pin used to repair his previous injury had been causing the horse discomfort and was restricting his movement. The pin was removed, allowing Duke of Marmalade to run free of pain as a four-year-old.

=== 2008: four-year-old season ===
==== Spring ====
As a four-year-old Duke of Marmalade had a notable run of success, winning his first five races. In all these races he was ridden by Johnny Murtagh and was usually accompanied by his pacemaker Red Rock Canyon. In April he was sent to Longchamp for the Group One Prix Ganay. He raced behind Spirit One before making his challenge in the straight and running on strongly under pressure to beat Saddex by half a length. It was his first major win, and his first win of any kind for more than twenty-one months. After the race, O'Brien called Duke of Marmalade "a horse to look forward to". At the Curragh a month later, he justified odds of 1/3 (0.33-1) in the Tattersalls Gold Cup, being driven out by Murtagh to beat the filly Finsceal Beo by one and a quarter lengths.

==== Summer ====
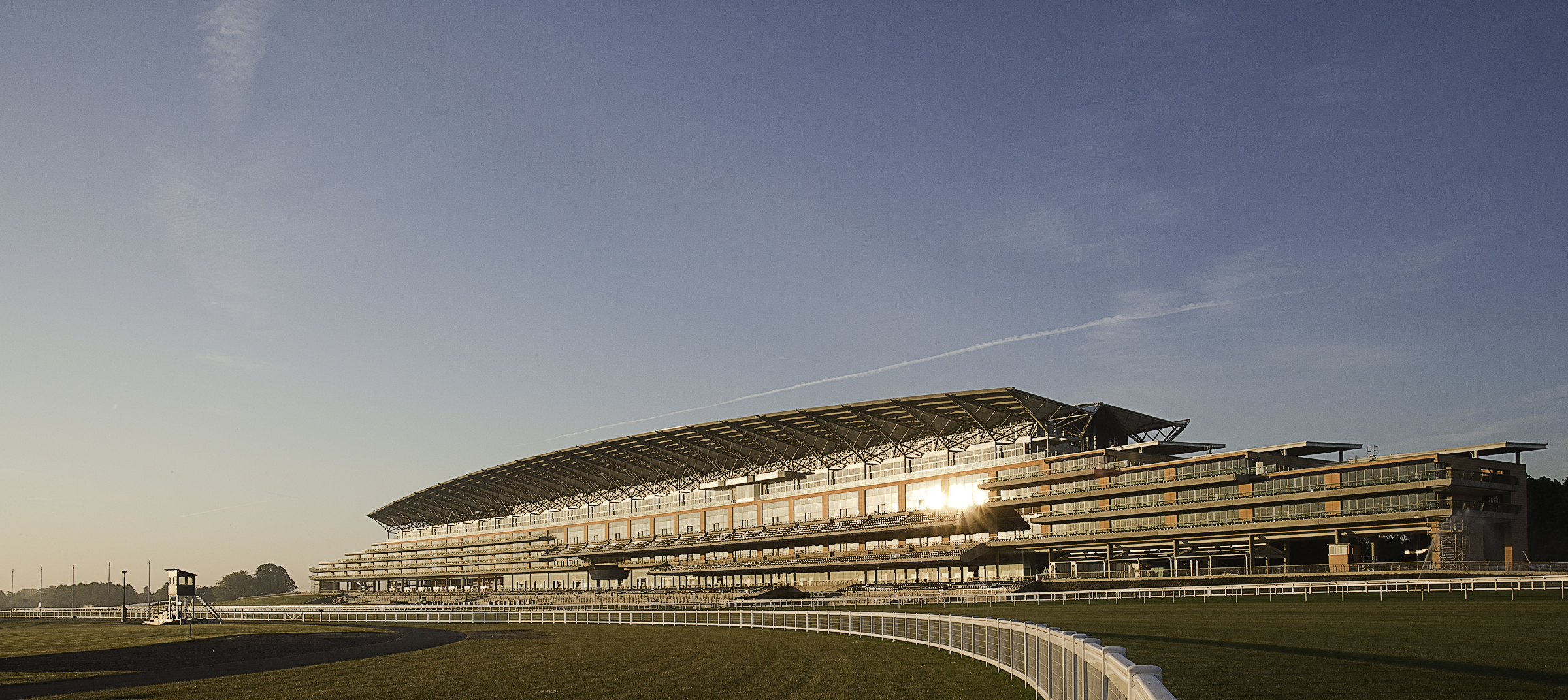
Ascot Racecourse: the site of two of Duke of Marmalade's major wins

In the Prince of Wales's Stakes at Royal Ascot he produced what his trainer considered his best performance to date, taking over from Red Rock Canyon in the straight where he "stormed clear" to win by four lengths from Phoenix Tower. The Guardian called it a "brilliant victory" while Murtagh described the colt as among the best he had ridden.

He then stepped up to twelve furlongs for Britain's most prestigious weight-for-age race, the King George VI and Queen Elizabeth Stakes, for which he was made 4/6 (0.67-1) favourite. With no three-year-old in the field, the race did not appear to be up to its usual standard. Duke of Marmalade was settled by Murtagh in the middle of the field before being switched to the outside in the straight and overtaking Red Rock Canyon entering the final furlong. He was immediately challenged and headed by the Michael Stoute-trained Papal Bull but "rallied gamely" to regain the lead close to the finish and win by a half a length. Murtagh was keen to praise the horse's speed and attitude, saying "mine has all that makes a real champion. He looked the other horse in the eye and ate ground. He has that will to win."

Duke of Marmalade was then brought back in distance from twelve furlongs to ten and a half furlongs for the International Stakes. The race also attracted The Derby winner New Approach, and the meeting of the two champions was much anticipated by the press as a "clash of the titans". Bad ground conditions forced the race to be abandoned, and it was rescheduled for Newmarket four days later. Duke of Marmalade took the lead three furlongs out and was driven out by Murtagh to beat Phoenix Tower by three-quarters of a length, with New Approach, who had pulled hard and failed to settle in the early stages, two and a half lengths further back in third. The colt's toughness and strong constitution were singled out for praise, with the press referring to him as the "Iron Duke".

O'Brien and his jockeys were later found guilty of using unfair tactics in the race and were punished by the British Horseracing Authority. While pacemakers are allowed, it is considered unfair to provide additional assistance, for instance manoeuvring a horse to ensure a clear run for a stable companion. O'Brien defended himself "fervently", calling the charges "fantasy...a load of nonsense."

==== Autumn ====
It was expected that Duke of Marmalade would meet New Approach again in the Irish Champion Stakes in September, but following heavy rain in the build-up to the race O'Brien withdrew the colt, saying "we don't want to subject him to soft ground now, with the rest of the year in mind."

Duke of Marmalade did not appear again until the Prix de l'Arc de Triomphe at Longchamp in October, for which he was made 4/1 second favourite despite O'Brien expressing concern over the soft ground. He was settled on the outside, but when Murtagh attempted to have him move forward in the straight, he made no progress and finished seventh of the sixteen runners behind Zarkava.

On his final start, he was sent to California for the Breeders' Cup Classic at Santa Anita. Racing on a synthetic track for the first time, he ran in third place for much of the distance and briefly headed the field turning into the straight, but faded in the closing stages to finish ninth of the twelve runners behind Raven's Pass. Murtagh and O'Brien characterised the performance as typifying "the end of a long, hard season" and Duke of Marmalade's retirement was announced immediately.

== Race record ==
Date	Race	Dist (f)	Course	Class	Prize (£K)	Odds	Runners	Placing	Margin	Time	Jockey	Trainer
21 June 2006	Unicredito Dublin EBF Maiden	6	Leopardstown	M	8	11/4	12	2	1.5	1:16.00	Seamie Heffernan	Aidan O'Brien
30 June 2006	Kildare Village Maiden Stakes	7	The Curragh	M	8	4/6	14	1	Neck	1:26.80	Kieren Fallon	Aidan O'Brien
2 August 2006	Vintage Stakes	7	Wolverhampton	2	39	11/4	10	2	Neck	1:26.02	Michael Kinane	Aidan O'Brien
5 May 2007	2000 Guineas	8	Newmarket Rowley	1	211	14/1	24	4	2.25	1:35.28	Michael Kinane	Aidan O'Brien
26 May 2007	Irish 2,000 Guineas	8	The Curragh	1	151	9/4	12	4	2.25	1:36.10	Seamie Heffernan	Aidan O'Brien
19 June 2008	St James's Palace Stakes	8	Ascot	1	141	11/1	8	2	Neck	1:39.33	Michael Kinane	Aidan O'Brien
21 August 2007	International Stakes	10.5	York	1	298	12/1	7	4	4.25	2:11.82	Michael Kinane	Aidan O'Brien
8 September 2007	Irish Champion Stakes	10	Leopardstown	1	404	15/2	6	2	1.5	2:02.27	Seamie Heffernan	Aidan O'Brien
29 September 2007	Queen Elizabeth II Stakes	8	Ascot	1	123	13/2	7	3	1	1:42.45	Michael Kinane	Aidan O'Brien
27 April 2008	Prix Ganay	10.5	Longchamp	1	126	19/5	6	1	0.5	2:08.30	Johnny Murtagh	Aidan O'Brien
25 May 2008	Tattersalls Gold Cup	10.5	The Curragh	1	136	1/3	6	1	1.25	2:15.77	Johnny Murtagh	Aidan O'Brien
18 June 2008	Prince of Wales's Stakes	10	Ascot	1	212	Evens	12	1	4	2:05.35	Johnny Murtagh	Aidan O'Brien
26 July 2008	King George VI & Queen Elizabeth Stakes	12	Ascot	1	482	4/6	8	1	0.5	2:27.91	Johnny Murtagh	Aidan O'Brien
23 August 2008	International Stakes	10	Newmarket July	1	141	4/6	9	1	0.75	2:01.53	Johnny Murtagh	Aidan O'Brien
5 October 2008	Prix de l'Arc de Triomphe	12	Longchamp	1	1680	4/1	16	7	4	2:28.80	Johnny Murtagh	Aidan O'Brien
25 October 2008	Breeders' Cup Classic	10	Santa Anita	1	1356	9/1	12	9	6.25	1:59.27	Johnny Murtagh	Aidan O'Brien

.

== Assessment, honours and awards ==
In November 2008, Duke of Marmalade was named European Champion Older Horse at the Cartier Racing Awards.

In the World Thoroughbred Racehorse Rankings for 2007, Duke of Marmalade was assessed on a mark of 120, placing him just outside the world's top thirty horses. In the 2008 Rankings, he was rated the fifth best horse in the world with a mark of 127 Duke of Marmalade was given an end of year rating of 132 by Timeform in 2008. A rating of 130 or above is regarded as the mark of a real "top-notcher."

== Stud career ==
He was retired from racing at the end of 2008 and stood as a stallion for Coolmore Stud where he used to shuttle between their main base in County Tipperary, Ireland during the Northern Hemisphere breeding season and Coolmore's Australian stud farm in the Hunter Region, New South Wales, during the Southern Hemisphere breeding season. His first foals were born in 2010. In 2014 he relocated to Drakenstein Stud in South Africa where his first South African foals were born in 2015. His offspring have included Group 1 winners Nutan (Deutsches Derby), Star of Seville (Prix de Diane), Simple Verse and Big Orange, as well as G2 winners Big Memory and Italian 1000 Guineas winner Sound of Freedom. On 10 November 2015, Simple Verse was named Cartier Champion Stayer at the 25th edition of the Cartier Racing Awards. In October it was announced that Duke of Marmalade had been pensioned from stud duty due on veterinary advice but would remain at Drakenstein. He died "peacefully" in his paddock on 5 November 2021.

== Pedigree ==
Pedigree of Duke of Marmalade (IRE), bay stallion, 2004
Sire Danehill (USA) 1986	Danzig; 1977	Northern Dancer	Nearctic
Sire Danehill (USA) 1986	Danzig; 1977	Northern Dancer	Natalma*
Sire Danehill (USA) 1986	Danzig; 1977	Pas de Nom	Admiral's Voyage
Sire Danehill (USA) 1986	Danzig; 1977	Pas de Nom	Petitioner
Sire Danehill (USA) 1986	Rayzana; 1981	His Majesty	Ribot
Sire Danehill (USA) 1986	Rayzana; 1981	His Majesty	Flower Bowl
Sire Danehill (USA) 1986	Rayzana; 1981	Spring Adieu	Buckpasser
Sire Danehill (USA) 1986	Rayzana; 1981	Spring Adieu	Natalma*
Dam Love Me True (USA) 1998	Kingmambo; 1990	Mr. Prospector	Raise a Native*
Dam Love Me True (USA) 1998	Kingmambo; 1990	Mr. Prospector	Gold Digger
Dam Love Me True (USA) 1998	Kingmambo; 1990	Miesque	Nureyev
Dam Love Me True (USA) 1998	Kingmambo; 1990	Miesque	Pasadoble
Dam Love Me True (USA) 1998	Lassie's Lady; 1981	Alydar	Raise a Native*
Dam Love Me True (USA) 1998	Lassie's Lady; 1981	Alydar	Sweet Tooth
Dam Love Me True (USA) 1998	Lassie's Lady; 1981	Lassie Dear	Buckpasser
Dam Love Me True (USA) 1998	Lassie's Lady; 1981	Lassie Dear	Gay Missile (Family: 3-l)

- Like all of Danehill's offspring Duke of Marmalade is inbred 4 × 4 to the mare Natalma. This means that she occurs twice in the fourth generation of his pedigree.
- Through his dam he is also inbred 4 × 4 to Raise a Native.
