= Nahoodh =

Irish-bred Thoroughbred racehorse

- Racing silks of Jaber Abdullah
- Sire: Clodovil
- Grandsire: Danehill
- Dam: Mise
- Damsire: Indian Ridge
- Sex: Mare
- Foaled: 24 January 2005
- Country: Ireland
- Colour: Grey
- Breeder: Petra Bloodstock Agency Ltd
- Owner: Jaber Abdullah; Hamdan bin Mohammed Al Maktoum
- Trainer: Mick Channon; Mark Johnston
- Record: 12: 2-1-1
- Earnings: £224,439

Major wins
- Lowther Stakes (2007); Falmouth Stakes (2008)

Nahoodh (foaled 24 January 2005) is an Irish-bred British-trained Thoroughbred racehorse and broodmare. She was sold as a foal and again as a yearling before entering training with Mick Channon. As a two-year-old she was beaten in her first two starts before recording her first major win in the Lowther Stakes. In the following year she finished fifth in the 1000 Guineas and was the beaten favourite in the Irish 1000 Guineas before being transferred to the stable of Mark Johnston. In July 2008 she recorded her biggest victory when she won the Group One Falmouth Stakes and went on to finish fourth in the Prix Rothschild and second in the Matron Stakes. She was retired from the end of the season and has had some success as a dam of winners.

== Background ==
Nahoodh is a grey mare bred in Ireland by the Lady Chryss O'Reily's Petra Bloodstock Agency. She was one of the best horses sired by Clodovil who won the Poule d'Essai des Poulains in 2003, and from whom she inherited her grey colour. Her dam Mise was unraced but came from a good family, being a female-line descendant of the influential American broodmare Fast Line, the ancestor of Bernardini and Northern Trick.

Nahoodh was offered for sale as a foal at Deauville in December 2005 and was bought for €30,000 by Emerald Bloodstock. In November 2006 the filly returned to the sales ring at Tattersalls and was sold to the bloodstock agent Gill Richardson for 19,000 guineas. Nahoodh entered the ownership of Jaber Abdullah and was sent into training with Mick Channon at West Ilsley in Berkshire.

== Racing career ==
=== 2007: two-year-old season ===
Rather than beginning her racing career in a maiden race, Nahoodh made her debut in the Group Two Cherry Hinton Stakes over six furlongs at Newmarket Racecourse on 11 July and finished twelfth of the fourteen runners behind the Aidan O'Brien-trained You'resothrilling. She was dropped to maiden class for a contest at Ascot Racecourse later that month and started the 11/4 favourite against fifteen opponents. She struggled to obtain a clear run in the straight and although she finished strongly she finished third, beaten a head and a short head by Albabilia and Naomh Geileis. Nahoodh was moved back up to Group Two class for the Lowther Stakes at York Racecourse in which she was ridden by Jamie Spencer and started 15/2 fourth choice in the betting behind Visit (winner of the Princess Margaret Stakes), Fleeting Spirit (Molecomb Stakes) and You'resothrilling. After being restrained by Spencer at the rear of the nine-runner field she was switched to the outside and began to make rapid progress in the last quarter mile. She overtook Fleeting Spirit a furlong out and held off a late challenge from Visit to win by half a length. The runner-up was later disqualified after testing positive for a banned substance. Spencer commented "She has loads of talent but wouldn't settle early. I went earlier than I normally would because you can get away with it on outsiders, and I took a chance".

=== 2008: three-year-old season ===
Richard Hughes rode Nahoodh in her first three races of 2008, starting with the Fred Darling Stakes at Newbury Racecourse on 19 April in which she finished unplaced behind Muthabara. In the 1000 Guineas over the Rowley mile at Newmarket on 4 May he started a 33/1 outsider but belied her odds as she was beaten less than one and a half lengths into fifth place behind Natagora, Spacious, Saoirse Abu and Infallible. In the Irish 1000 Guineas at the Curragh three weeks later she started favourite but after reaching fourth place in the straight she faded in the closing stages and finished seventh behind Halfway to Heaven. After the race the filly was acquired by Hamdan bin Mohammed Al Maktoum and was transferred to the stable of Mark Johnston in Yorkshire.

Frankie Dettori took over from Hughes when Nahoodh contested the Coronation Stakes at Royal Ascot. In a change of tactics she went to the front from the start but after being overtaken a furlong out she dropped from contention and finished sixth, seven lengths behind the winner Lush Lashes. Dettori was again in the saddle when Nahoodh was matched against older fillies and mares for the first time in the Group One Falmouth Stakes over one mile on soft ground at Newmarket's July course on 9 July. The five-year-old Heaven Sent (Dahlia Stakes) started favourite ahead of Infallible (Nell Gwyn Stakes), Finsceal Beo from Ireland, Seachange (Telegraph Handicap) from New Zealand and Briseida (German 1000 Guineas) from Germany with Nahoodh next in the betting on 10/1. The other five runners were Lady Gloria (Princess Elizabeth Stakes), Majestic Roi (Sun Chariot Stakes), Kasumi (Pipalong Stakes), Love of Dubai (Premio Regina Elena) and the 100/1 outsider Hip. Nahoodh was held up by Dettori as Lady Gloria set the pace before giving way to Infallible in the last quarter mile. Nahoodh made rapid progress from the year, overtook Infallible a furlong out and won by one and a half lengths despite hanging to the left in the closing stages. Heaven Sent took third with a gap back to Seachange in fourth place. After the race Johnston said "They say one swallow doesn't make a summer but it does if it's big enough".

On 3 August Nahoodh was sent to France or the Prix Rothschild over 1600 metres at Deauville Racecourse and finished fourth behind Goldikova, Darjina and Natagora. In September Nahoodh was sent to Ireland for the Group One Matron Stakes at Leopardstown Racecourse and started 6/1 third favourite behind Lush Lashes and Halfway to Heaven. Ridden by Mick Kinane she raced in sixth place in the early stages before making steady progress in the straight and finished second by a neck to Lush Lashes in a closely contested finish with Halfway to Heaven and You'resothrilling close behind in third and fourth. Nahoodh failed to reproduce her best form in two subsequent races. She finished seventh behind Halfway to Heaven in the Sun Chariot Stakes at Newmarket in October and eighth behind Estejo in the Premio Roma in November.

== Breeding record ==
At the end of her racing career Nahoodh was retired from racing to become a broodmare for Sheikh Mohammed's Darley Stud. To date (2016) she has produced at least three foals and two winners:

- Deserving Honour, a grey colt (later gelded) foaled in 2010, sired by Street Cry. Failed to win in four races.
- Fire Blaze, grey filly, 2011, by Dubawi. Won one race.
- Hawkesbury, grey colt (later gelded), 2012, by Shamardal. Won four races.
- River of Gold, chestnut colt (later gelded), 2015, by New Approach, won one race.
- Cosmology, a grey colt (later gelded) foaled in 2016, sired by Sea The Stars. Failed to win in two races.
- Nations Beauty, grey filly, 2017, by Dark Angel. Fell in her only race.
- Great News, grey colt (later gelded), 2018, by Shamardal. Won one race.
- Outside World, grey filly, 2019, by Iffraaj. Won three races.
- Naturelle, grey filly, 2020, by Night of Thunder. Failed to win in two races.
- Etes Vous Prets, grey filly, 2021, by Too Darn Hot. Won Fillies' Revue.

== Pedigree ==
Pedigree of Nahoodh (IRE), grey mare, 2005
Sire Clodovil (IRE) 2000	Danehill (USA); 1986	Danzig	Northern Dancer
Sire Clodovil (IRE) 2000	Danehill (USA); 1986	Danzig	Pas de Nom
Sire Clodovil (IRE) 2000	Danehill (USA); 1986	Razyana	His Majesty
Sire Clodovil (IRE) 2000	Danehill (USA); 1986	Razyana	Spring Adieu
Sire Clodovil (IRE) 2000	Clodora (FR); 1994	Linamix	Mendez
Sire Clodovil (IRE) 2000	Clodora (FR); 1994	Linamix	Lunadix
Sire Clodovil (IRE) 2000	Clodora (FR); 1994	Cloche d'Or	Good Times
Sire Clodovil (IRE) 2000	Clodora (FR); 1994	Cloche d'Or	Chrysicabana
Dam Mise (IRE) 2000	Indian Ridge (IRE); 1985	Ahonoora	Lorenzaccio
Dam Mise (IRE) 2000	Indian Ridge (IRE); 1985	Ahonoora	Helen Nichols
Dam Mise (IRE) 2000	Indian Ridge (IRE); 1985	Hillbrow	Swing Easy
Dam Mise (IRE) 2000	Indian Ridge (IRE); 1985	Hillbrow	Golden City
Dam Mise (IRE) 2000	Misbegotten (IRE); 1991	Baillamont	Blushing Groom
Dam Mise (IRE) 2000	Misbegotten (IRE); 1991	Baillamont	Lodeve
Dam Mise (IRE) 2000	Misbegotten (IRE); 1991	Mistreat	Gay Mecene
Dam Mise (IRE) 2000	Misbegotten (IRE); 1991	Mistreat	Mirea (Family 4-m)
