= Keltos (horse) =

French-bred Thoroughbred racehorse

- Sire: Kendor
- Grandsire: Kenmare
- Dam: Loxandra
- Damsire: Last Tycoon
- Sex: Stallion
- Foaled: 25 March 1998
- Country: France
- Colour: Grey
- Breeder: Stilvi Compania Financera Sa
- Owner: Leonidas Marinopoulos & Gary Tanaka
- Trainer: Carlos Laffon-Parias
- Record: 24: 9-5-2
- Earnings: £297,969

Major wins
- Prix de Pontarme (2001); Prix Perth (2001); Prix du Muguet (2002); Lockinge Stakes (2002); Prix Tantieme (2004)

Keltos (foaled 25 March 1998) is a French Thoroughbred racehorse and sire best known for his win in the 2002 Lockinge Stakes. After finishing second on his only appearance as a juvenile he won four races in 2001 including the Listed Prix de Pontarme and the Group Three Prix Perth. In the following spring he won the Prix du Muguet and defeated a top class-field in the Lockinge Stakes before being retired to stud. After suffering from low fertility he returned to racing in 2004 and won the Listed Prix Tantieme as well as being placed in several important races. In 2005 he won one minor race from starts and was retired from racing at the end of the season. He has had moderate success in his second spell as a breeding stallion.

== Background ==
Keltos is a grey horse bred in France by Stilvi Compania Financera, the horse-breeding company of his owner Leonidas Marinopoulos. His grey coat quickly lightened and he appeared to be almost white by the spring of his four-year-old campaign. He was sired by Kendor, whose wins included the Grand Critérium and the Poule d'Essai des Poulains before being retired to stud where his other winners included the Champion Stakes winner Literato. Keltos's dam Loxandra showed modest racing ability, winning one minor race at Newcastle Racecourse from four starts as a three-year-old in 1994. Her dam Northshiel was a half-sister to the Queen Anne Stakes winner Waajib. Loxandra herself was a successful broodmare who also produced the Prix Jean de Chaudenay winner Loxias.

Keltos raced in the ownership Marinopoulos and was sent into training with Carlos Laffon-Parias at Chantilly. At various points in his racing career Gary Tanaka was listed as the colt's part or sole owner.

== Racing career ==
=== 2000: two-year-old season ===
Keltos made his racecourse debut in the Prix Diatome over 1400 metres on heavy ground at Saint-Cloud Racecourse on 14 November in which he started at odds of 7.5/1 in a ten-runner field. Ridden by Dominique Boeuf, he finished second, two and a half lengths behind the André Fabre-trained Walking Around.

=== 2001: three-year-old season ===
Keltos recorded his first success on his three-year-old debut in the Prix Callitrate at Saint-Cloud on 15 March as he won "very easily" by five lengths from the Alain de Royer-Dupré-trained Early Days. He was even more impressive in the Prix du Vert Galant at Longchamp Racecourse on 8 April as he took the lead approaching the last 200 metres and drew right away from his six opponents to win by ten lengths. The colt was then moved up sharply in class for the Group One Poule d'Essai des Poulains over the same course and distance on 13 May and started favourite despite racing on much firmer ground than he had previously encountered. He appeared to be outpaced in the closing stages and finished sixth behind Noverre, although he was promoted to fifth when the "winner" was disqualified. He was dropped to Listed class at the end of the month for the Prix de Pontarme at Chantilly Racecourse and recorded his third win of the season as he won by three-quarters of a length from Spanish Don. For his fifth run of the season, Keltos was sent to England to contest the St James's Palace Stakes over one mile at Royal Ascot in June. He started a 33/1 outsider and never looked likely to win, but kept on well in the straight to finish sixth of the eleven runners behind Black Minnaloushe.

After a break of four and a half months, Keltos returned in November for the Group Three Prix Perth at Saint-Cloud in which he was matched against older horses for the first time. Racing on his favoured soft ground and ridden by Davy Bonilla he headed the betting market at odds of 1.8/1 in a fourteen-runner field. The best fancied of his opponents were Kingsalsa (winner of the Prix du Chemin de Fer du Nord), Lugny (a successful performer in handicap races), Bedawin (Grand Prix de Marseille) and the British challenger Cornelius. Keltos raced just behind the leaders as Cornelius set the pace and turned into the straight in third place. He stayed on well in the closing stages to catch the British gelding in the final strides and won by a short head to secure his biggest win up to that time.

=== 2002: four-year-old season ===
In early 2002 Keltos was sent to the United Arab Emirates to contest the seventh running of the Dubai World Cup on dirt at Nad Al Sheba Racecourse on 23 March. Starting a 66/1 outsider he reached fourth place in the straight but then faded to finish eighth behind Street Cry. On his return to Europe the colt started 6/5 favourite for the Group Two Prix du Muguet at Saint-Cloud on 1 May. Cornelius, Bedawin and Lugny were again in opposition whilst the best of the other five runners appeared to be the John Gosden-trained Binary File. Ridden by Olivier Peslier, he turned into the straight in seventh place before running on strongly in the last 400 metres. He overtook Cornelius and Mahfooth 100 metres out and drew away to win by two lengths.

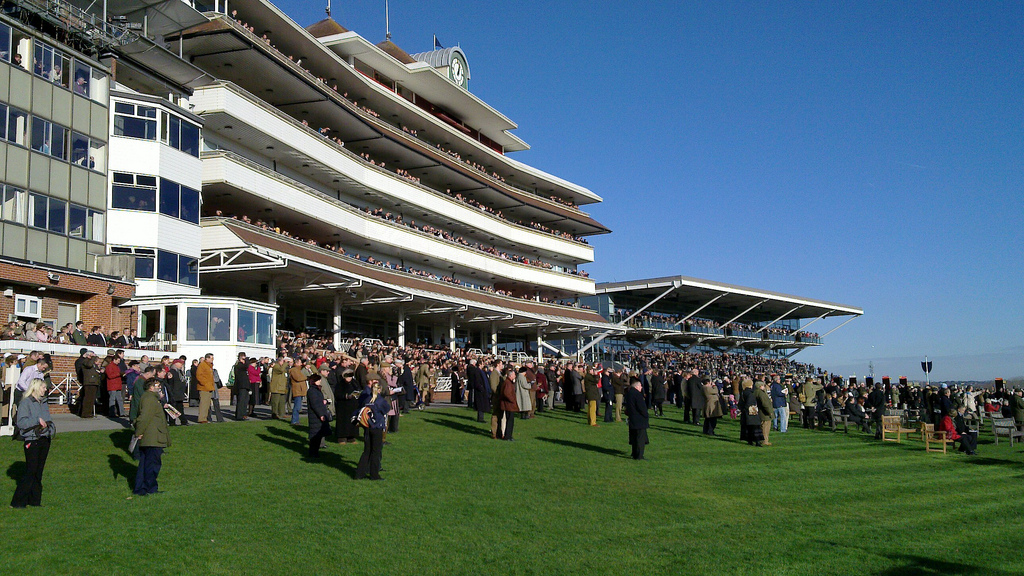
Newbury Racecourse: the site of Keltos's biggest win

Keltos was then sent to England for the Group One Lockinge Stakes over one mile at Newbury Racecourse on 18 May in which he was again ridden by Peslier. As he had not been among the original entries his owners had to pay a supplementary entry fee of £12,000. Noverre started favourite ahead of Olden Times (Prix Jean Prat) with Keltos the 9/1 joint third favourite alongside No Excuse Needed (Celebration Mile) and Swallow Flight (Sandown Mile). The other five runners were Summoner (Queen Elizabeth II Stakes), Warningford (Leicestershire Stakes), Cape Town (European Free Handicap), Atavus (Hungerford Stakes) and Umitstim (Craven Stakes). Peslier settled the colt towards the rear of the field as Summoner set the pace before Noverre went to the front a quarter of a mile from the finish. After being hampered as he attempted to obtain a clear run, Keltos moved up alongside Noverre a furlong out and then drew away to win "comfortably" by three and a half lengths. After the race Peslier said "I thought I would come late. I moved inside and he was blocked a little bit. But my horse travelled very well and I just waited a little bit because my horse has got a good turn of foot". The colt's owner Gary Tanaka mentioned the Queen Anne Stakes, Sussex Stakes and Breeders' Cup Mile as future targets before commenting "It is much more fun winning in Europe than the States,".

Despite Tanaka's predictions Keltos did not race again in 2002. He sustained a fetlock injury in August and was retired to stud.

=== 2004: six-year-old season ===
Keltos had serious fertility problems as a breeding stallion at the Airlie Stud in Ireland in 2005 and was returned to training as a six-year-old in 2004.

He made a successful comeback in the Prix Carteret over 1400 metres at Maisons-Laffitte in April, winning by a length and a half from Am Brose. In July he finished runner up in Listed races at Nantes and Vichy and then finished second to Maxwell in the Group Three Prix Quincey at Deauville Racecourse in August. In September he started favourite for the Group Three Prix du Pin at Longchamp but finished fourth of the twelve runners behind Comete. In October he finished fifth in the Prix Daniel Wildenstein and then went to England for the Challenge Stakes at Newmarket Racecourse where he finished second to the Godolphin runner Firebreak. At the end of the month he attempted to repeat his 2001 success in the Prix Perth, but after taking the lead 200 metres out he was overtaken in the final strides and finished third behind Valentino and Svedov. On his final start of the year he was dropped back to Listed class for the Prix Tantieme over 1600 metres on heavy ground at Saint-Cloud on 23 November and started 4/5 favourite in a nine-runner field. Ridden by Miguel Blancpain he took the lead 300 metres out and held off the German challenger Salon Turtle to win by three quarters of a length.

=== 2005: seven-year-old season ===
In March 2005 Keltos was again sent to Dubai but his second visit to Nad Al Sheba proved even less successful than his first as he finished last of the twelve runners in the Godolphin Mile. On his return to Europe he finished unplaced behind Martillo in the Prix du Muguet and then contested the Prix Volandry over 1600 metres at Saint-Cloud on 6 June. Ridden by Peslier, he was beaten a neck by the five-year-old mare Together but was awarded the race when the "winner" was disqualified. In his two remaining races he finished fourth in a Listed race at Nantes and seventh in a Listed race at Deauville on 2 August.

== Stud record ==
Keltos was retired to stud for a second time in 2007. He stood at the Chevington Stud in England before moving to the Haras des Granges in France a year later. In 2010 he was transferred to Spain where he stood at the Dehesa de Milagro before moving to the Haras de Marmaria a year later. The best of his offspring have included the Listed winners Evening Time and Kelty In Love and the successful steeplechaser Kelthomas.

== Pedigree ==
Pedigree of Keltos (FR), grey horse, 1998
Sire Kendor (FR) 1986	Kenmare (FR); 1975	Kalamoun	Zeddaan
Sire Kendor (FR) 1986	Kenmare (FR); 1975	Kalamoun	Khairunissa
Sire Kendor (FR) 1986	Kenmare (FR); 1975	Belle of Ireland	Milesian
Sire Kendor (FR) 1986	Kenmare (FR); 1975	Belle of Ireland	Belle of the Ball
Sire Kendor (FR) 1986	Belle Mecene (FR); 1982	Gay Mecene	Vaguely Noble
Sire Kendor (FR) 1986	Belle Mecene (FR); 1982	Gay Mecene	Gay Missile
Sire Kendor (FR) 1986	Belle Mecene (FR); 1982	Djaka Belle	Djakao
Sire Kendor (FR) 1986	Belle Mecene (FR); 1982	Djaka Belle	Orleans Belle
Dam Loxandra (GB) 1991	Last Tycoon (IRE); 1983	Try My Best	Northern Dancer
Dam Loxandra (GB) 1991	Last Tycoon (IRE); 1983	Try My Best	Sex Appeal
Dam Loxandra (GB) 1991	Last Tycoon (IRE); 1983	Mill Princess	Mill Reef
Dam Loxandra (GB) 1991	Last Tycoon (IRE); 1983	Mill Princess	Irish Lass
Dam Loxandra (GB) 1991	Northshiel (GB); 1984	Northfields	Northern Dancer
Dam Loxandra (GB) 1991	Northshiel (GB); 1984	Northfields	Little Hut
Dam Loxandra (GB) 1991	Northshiel (GB); 1984	Coryana	Sassafras
Dam Loxandra (GB) 1991	Northshiel (GB); 1984	Coryana	Rosolini (Family 6-d)

- Through his dam, Keltos was inbred 4 × 4 to Northern Dancer, meaning that this stallion appears twice in the fourth generation of his pedigree.
