= Prix Perth =

Flat horse race in France

- Class: Group 3
- Location: Saint-Cloud Racecourse; Saint-Cloud, France
- Inaugurated: 1901
- Race type: Flat / Thoroughbred
- Website: france-galop.com

Race information
- Distance: 1,600 metres (1 mile)
- Surface: Turf
- Track: Left-handed
- Qualification: Three-years-old and up
- Weight: 56 kg (3yo); 57 kg (4yo+); Allowances; 1½ kg for fillies and mares Penalties; 3½ kg for Group 1 winners * 3½ kg if two Group 2 wins * 2½ kg if one Group 2 win * 2½ kg if two Group 3 wins * 1½ kg if one Group 3 win * * since January 1
- Purse: €80,000 (2016); 1st: €40,000

Prix Perth
2025
Sparks Fly	Vertbois	Chibitty

Previous years
2024
Alcantor	Sirona	Johan
2023
Belbek	The Revenant	Tribalist
2022
Facteur Cheval	Tribalist	Rosacea
2021
Magny Cours	Century Dream	Brentford Hope

2020-2011
2020
Jin Jin	Alson	Irska
2019
Miss O Connor	Kourkan	Plumatic
2018
Auenperle	Graphite	Wootton
2016
Siyoushake	Crazy Horse	Kourkan
2015
My Dream Boat	Momayyaz	Stillman
2014
Flamingo Star	Pinturicchio	Visoriyna
2013
Amaron	Sommerabend	Sarkiyla
2012
Don Bosco	Evaporation	Sarkiyla
2011
Cityscape	Sommerabend	Akarlina

2010-2001
2010
Rajsaman	Alianthus	Skins Game
2009
Zafisio	Border Patrol	Racinger
2008
Vertigineux	Gris De Gris	Racinger
2007
Chopastair	Cicerole	Athanor
2006
Passager	Gwenseb	Svedov
2005
Rageman	Helios Quercus	Special Kaldoun
2004
Valentino	Svedov	Keltos
2003
My Risk	Execute	Saratan
2002
Special Kaldoun	Charming Groom	Cornelius
2001
Keltos	Cornelius	May Ball

2000-1990
2000
Jim And Tonic	Memory Maker	Princess Carla
1999
Danzigaway	Sossus Vlei	Miss Berbere
1998
Handsome Ridge	Field Of Hope	Gold Away
1997
Jim And Tonic	Marathon	Parfait Glace
1996
River Bay	Decorated Hero	Blushing Gleam
1995
Nec Plus Ultra	Neverneyev	Mutakddim
1994
Freedom Cry	Scandinavian	Misbegotten
1993
Zabar	Borage	Homme De Loi
1992
Northern Crystal	Voleris	Leariva
1991
Susurration	Dolpour	Hello Pink
1990
Taffeta And Tulle	Zille	Ocean Falls

The Prix Perth is a Group 3 flat horse race in France open to thoroughbreds aged three years or older. It is run at Saint-Cloud over a distance of 1,600 metres (about 1 mile), and it is scheduled to take place each year in late October or early November.

== History ==
The event is named after Perth, a successful racehorse whose career concluded in 1900. It was established in 1901, and was originally run at Maisons-Laffitte over 2,200 metres. It was extended to 2,400 metres in 1906, and to 2,500 metres in 1908.

The Prix Perth was abandoned throughout World War I, with no running from 1914 to 1918. It was held at Saint-Cloud over 2,400 metres in 1919, and at Maisons-Laffitte over 2,500 metres in 1920. A period at Saint-Cloud over 2,500 metres began in 1921.

The race was cancelled twice during World War II, in 1939 and 1940. It was switched to Longchamp and increased to 3,000 metres in 1941. It was staged at Maisons-Laffitte in 1943, Le Tremblay in 1944, and Longchamp again in 1945. It reverted to 2,500 metres at Saint-Cloud in 1946.

The current version of the Prix Perth was introduced in 1949. From this point its distance was 1,600 metres. It was contested at Longchamp in 1954, and returned to Saint-Cloud in 1955.

The present system of race grading started in 1971, and the Prix Perth was classed at Group 3 level. It was shortened to 1,550 metres in 1978, and restored to 1,600 metres the following year.

== Records ==
Most successful horse (2 wins):

- Exema – 1902, 1903
- Le Debardeur – 1925, 1926
- Jim and Tonic – 1997, 2000

Leading jockey (5 wins):

- Paul Blanc – Prince Ki (1946), Symphonie (1947), Ksarinor (1950), Bougainville (1951), Riverain (1953)
- Dominique Boeuf – French Stress (1988), Handsome Ridge (1998), Special Kaldoun (2002), Passager (2006), Zafisio (2009)

Leading trainer (4 wins):

- Criquette Head-Maarek – Gay Minstrel (1986), Malaspina (1987), Danzigaway (1999), Passager (2006)

Leading owner (3 wins):

- Jean Stern – Bougainville (1951), Sweet Home (1957), Lelio (1960)
- Mahmoud Fustok – Hilal (1980), Green Paradise (1984), Over the Ocean (1985)

== Winners since 1981 ==
Year	Winner	Age	Jockey	Trainer	Owner	Time
1981	Princes Gate	4	Greville Starkey	Harry Thomson Jones	Mrs R. Vereker
1982	Commodore Blake	5	Walter Swinburn	Michael Stoute	David Minton
1983	Rare Roberta	3	Richard Quinn	Paul Cole	Guiting Stud Ltd
1984	Green Paradise	3	Yves Saint-Martin	Roger Wojtowiez	Mahmoud Fustok
1985	Over the Ocean	3	Alain Badel	Georges Mikhalidès	Mahmoud Fustok
1986	Gay Minstrel	5	Freddy Head	Criquette Head	Jacques Wertheimer
1987	Malaspina	3	Gary W. Moore	Criquette Head	Ghislaine Head
1988	French Stress	3	Dominique Boeuf	André Fabre	Paul de Moussac	1:42.90
1989	Miss Kenmare	4	Éric Legrix	Marcel Rolland	Henri Chalhoub
1990	Taffeta and Tulle	4	Pat Eddery	Nicolas Clément	Sheikh Mohammed	1:49.70
1991	Susurration	4	Frankie Dettori	John Gosden	Pin Oak Stable	1:50.30
1992	Northern Crystal	4	Sylvain Guillot	André Fabre	Sheikh Mohammed	1:49.50
1993	Zabar	5	Cash Asmussen	Jonathan Pease	Gerald Leigh	1:51.80
1994	Freedom Cry	3	Thierry Jarnet	André Fabre	Daniel Wildenstein	1:49.00
1995	Nec Plus Ultra ^{[a]}	4	Gérald Mossé	Alain de Royer-Dupré	Marquesa de Moratalla	1:38.20
1996	River Bay	3	Thierry Jarnet	John Hammond	Ecurie Chalhoub	1:52.40
1997	Jim and Tonic	3	Gérald Mossé	François Doumen	Haras d'Ecouves	1:47.80
1998	Handsome Ridge	4	Dominique Boeuf	John Gosden	Platt Promotions Ltd	1:53.90
1999	Danzigaway	3	Davy Bonilla	Criquette Head	Wertheimer et Frère	1:51.80
2000	Jim and Tonic	6	Gérald Mossé	François Doumen	John Martin	1:49.50
2001	Keltos	3	Davy Bonilla	Carlos Laffon-Parias	Tanaka / Marinopoulos	1:45.50
2002	Special Kaldoun	3	Dominique Boeuf	David Smaga	Ecurie Chalhoub	1:50.90
2003	My Risk	4	Christophe Soumillon	Jean-Marie Béguigné	Roland Monnier	1:47.60
2004	Valentino	5	Ioritz Mendizabal	Alain de Royer-Dupré	Fierro / Forien	1:45.40
2005	Rageman	5	Stéphane Pasquier	Michel Cheno	Marquesa de Moratalla	1:44.60
2006	Passager	3	Dominique Boeuf	Criquette Head-Maarek	Alec Head	1:41.60
2007	Chopastair	6	Jean-Bernard Eyquem	Thierry Lemer	Ivoula / Blazy	1:46.50
2008	Vertigineux	4	Philippe Sogorb	Carole Dufrèche	C. & P. Dufrèche	1:45.70
2009	Zafisio	3	Dominique Boeuf	Roger Curtis	Downs / Looney	1:45.30
2010	Rajsaman	3	Davy Bonilla	Freddy Head	Saeed Al Romaithi	1:45.40
2011	Cityscape	5	Steve Drowne	Roger Charlton	Khalid Abdullah	1:43.80
2012	Don Bosco	5	Flavien Prat	David Smaga	Omar El Sharif	1:50.80
2013	Amaron	4	Fabien Lefebvre	Andreas Löwe	Gestut Winterhauch	1:50.59
2014	Flamingo Star	4	Alexander Pietsch	Waldemar Hickst	Frau Marlene Haller	1:41.72
2015	My Dream Boat	3	Christophe Soumillon	Clive Cox	Paul & Clare Rooney	1:45.05
2016	Siyoushake	4	Stéphane Pasquier	Freddy Head	Roy Racing & A Morley	1:43.24
2017	no race ^{[b]}
2018	Auenperle	3	Ioritz Mendizabal	Christina Bucher	Rudolf Remund	1:45.27
2019	Miss O Connor	4	Pierre-Charles Boudot	William Haggas	Lael Stable	1:49.99
2020	Jin Jin	4	Maxim Pecheur	Bohumil Nedorostek	Sabine Goldberg	1:48.77
2021	Magny Cours	6	Mickael Barzalona	André Fabre	Godolphin	1:44.80
2022	Facteur Cheval	3	Gérald Mossé	Jerome Reynier	Team Valor International & Gary Barber	1:47.99
2023	Belbek	3	Bauyrzhan Murzabayev	André Fabre	Nurlan Bizakov	1:43.93

^{a} Neverneyev finished first in 1995, but he was relegated to second place following a stewards' inquiry.
^{b} The 2017 running was abandoned due to protests at Saint-Cloud.

== Earlier winners ==
- 1901: Grey Melton
- 1902: Exema
- 1903: Exema
- 1904: Hebron
- 1905: Presto
- 1906: Montlieu
- 1907: Moulins la Marche
- 1908: Mafia II
- 1909: Herouval
- 1910: Ronde de Nuit
- 1911: Lahire
- 1912: Agenda
- 1913: Fidelio
- 1914–18: no race
- 1919: Samourai
- 1920: Manor
- 1921: Astypalee
- 1922: Subaltern
- 1923: Kefalin
- 1924: Mazeppa
- 1925: Le Debardeur
- 1926: Le Debardeur
- 1927: Petit Bob
- 1928: Sachet
- 1929: Amorina
- 1930: Florac
- 1931: Tapinois
- 1932: Foxarella
- 1933: Annonciade
- 1934: Grand Lama
- 1935: Bilbao
- 1936: Sanglot
- 1937: Organeau
- 1938: Argentino
- 1939–40: no race
- 1941: Babouino
- 1942: Duralumet
- 1943: Guirlande
- 1944: L'Aretin
- 1945: Boum
- 1946: Prince Ki
- 1947: Symphonie
- 1948:
- 1949: Floral Art
- 1950: Ksarinor
- 1951: Bougainville
- 1952: La Fangeaye
- 1953: Riverain
- 1954: Le Lanfonnet
- 1955: Eban
- 1956: Blockhaus
- 1957: Sweet Home
- 1958: La Vanda
- 1959: Red Arrow
- 1960: Lelio
- 1961: Rieuse
- 1962: Aravios
- 1963: Piaf
- 1964: Baldric
- 1965: Tycoon
- 1966: Adjar
- 1967:
- 1968:
- 1969: Jimmy Reppin
- 1970: Lord Gayle
- 1971: Sparkler
- 1972: Gift Card
- 1973: Silver Zara
- 1974: El Rastro
- 1975: Riot in Paris
- 1976: Dominion
- 1977: Jellaby
- 1978: A Thousand Stars
- 1979: Tannenberg
- 1980: Hilal

== See also ==
- List of French flat horse races
