= Papal Bull (horse) =

British-bred Thoroughbred racehorse

- Sire: Montjeu
- Grandsire: Sadler's Wells
- Dam: Mialuna
- Damsire: Zafonic
- Sex: Stallion
- Foaled: 29 March 2003
- Country: United Kingdom
- Colour: Bay
- Breeder: B H & C F D Simpson
- Owner: Susan Magnier, Derrick Smith & Michael Tabor; Papal Bull Syndicate
- Trainer: Michael Stoute
- Record: 21: 6-4-1
- Earnings: £507,184

Major wins
- Chester Vase (2006); King Edward VII Stakes (2006); Princess of Wales's Stakes (2007); Geoffrey Freer Stakes (2007)

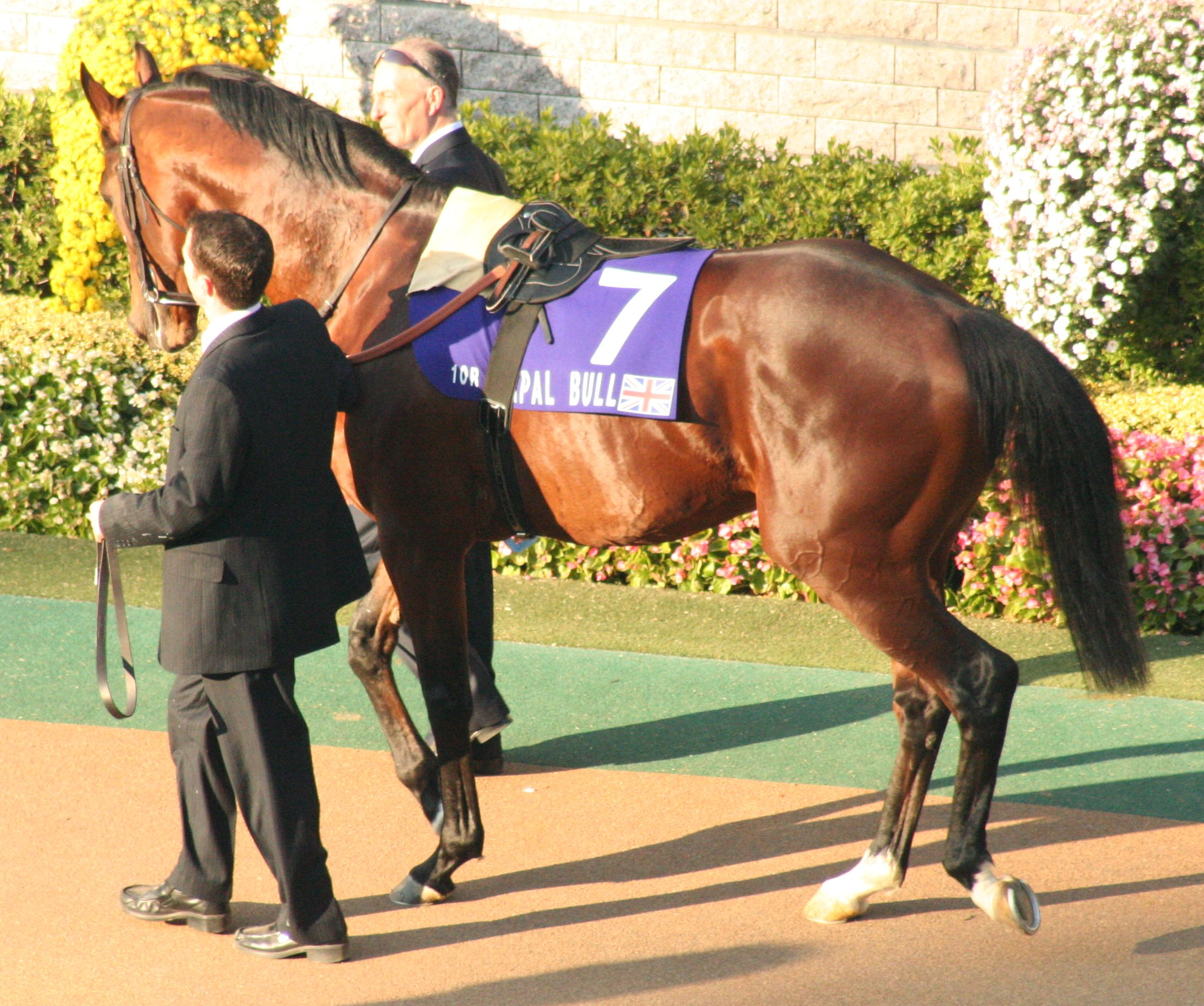
Papal Bull

Papal Bull (foaled 29 March 2003) is a British Thoroughbred racehorse and sire. Although he never won a Group 1 race he was rated at his peak as one of the best middle distance horses in the world. He was variously described by the men who rode him as "quirky", "a bit of a monkey" and "a lazy little devil". After winning one minor race as a juvenile in 2005 he improved in the following year to win the Chester Vase and the King Edward VII Stakes. He was even better in 2007 when he took the Princess of Wales's Stakes and the Geoffrey Freer Stakes. In 2008, as a five-year-old he failed to win a race but produced a career-best performance when narrowly beaten by Duke of Marmalade in the King George VI and Queen Elizabeth Stakes. He made very little impact as a breeding stallion.

== Background ==
Papal Bull is a bay horse with a narrow white blaze bred in England by B H & C F D Simpson. As a foal in November 2003 the colt was offered for sale at Tattersalls and was bought for 20,000 guineas by Highfort Stud. A year later he was returned to the Tattersalls auction ring and was sold for 100,000 guineas to the bloodstock agent Dermot "Demi" O'Byrne, who was acting on behalf of John Magnier's Coolmore Stud. Unlike the majority of Coolmore's best horses which are trained at Ballydoyle, Papal Bull was sent into training with Michael Stoute at the Freemason Lodge stable in Newmarket, Suffolk.

He was from the first crop of foals sired by Montjeu whose wins included the Prix du Jockey Club, Irish Derby, Prix de l'Arc de Triomphe and King George VI and Queen Elizabeth Stakes. As a breeding stallion his other progeny included Motivator, Authorized, Pour Moi, Camelot, Scorpion, Masked Marvel, Hurricane Fly, St Nicholas Abbey and Hurricane Run. Papal Bull's dam Mialuna was an unraced daughter of Mamaluna, a mare who won the Nassau Stakes and finished third in the Epsom Oaks. As a descendant of the American broodmare June Rose (foaled 1916) Mamaluna was distantly related to Creator and Mecca's Angel.

== Racing career ==
=== 2005: two-year-old season ===
On his racecourse debut Papal Bull started at odds of 6/1 for a minor race over seven furlongs at Newmarket Racecourse 3 September and finished fourth of the eight runners. Later that month at Salisbury Racecourse he started odds on favourite for a maiden race but after disputing the lead for most of the way he was beaten one and a half lengths into second place by Botteen. At Leicester Racecourse on 11 October the colt was ridden by Kieren Fallon and started 8/13 favourite for a maiden. He led from the start and won by two lengths from Cousteau despite being eased down in the final strides.

=== 2006: three-year-old season ===
Papal Bull began his second campaign in a ten furlong handicap race at Newmarket on 20 April in which he carried 130 pounds and started the 5/1 second choice in the betting. He was restrained by Fallon before taking the lead and winning by one and a quarter lengths from Linas Selection and eight others. On 11 May, the colt was stepped up in class and distance for the Group 3 Chester Vase (a trial race for the Epsom Derby) over one and a half miles at Chester Racecourse and started 6/4 favourite ahead of the Sandown Classic Trial winner Primary. Ridden by Fallon he started slowly but moved up to take the lead inside the final furlong and won by three quarters of a length from Dragon Dancer. Stoute described the winner as "still a bit babyish" whereas Fallon was more enthusiastic, saying "he'll look better on a galloping track. He has a great attitude, he's improving with racing, and he has shown he stays".

On 3 June Papal Bull started at odds of 11/1 in an eighteen-runner field for the 2006 Epsom Derby. He looked to be making good progress on the inside in the straight but was badly hampered two furlongs out and came home tenth behind Sir Percy. Three weeks later at Royal Ascot the colt was partnered by Fallon in the King Edward VII Stakes and started the 5/4 favourite ahead of eight opponents including Youmzain, Sixties Icon and Red Rocks. After tracking the leaders he went to front approaching the final furlong and held off the challenge of Red Rocks to win by a neck. Fallon commented "I thought he was going to do it easier but he's obviously a lazy little devil. He's got a big future, he's a playboy but great to ride. He's a natural and does everything for you".

At York Racecourse in August Papal Bull started favourite for the Great Voltigeur Stakes, a major trial for the St Leger, but ran poorly and finished unplaced in a race won by Youmzain. The colt was then sent to France for the Prix Niel over 2400 metres at Longchamp Racecourse on 10 September. He was in second place for most of race but was outpaced in the closing stages and finished fifth of the seven runners behind Rail Link.

In the 2006 World Thoroughbred Racehorse Rankings Papal Bull was rated the 130th best racehorse in the world.

=== 2007: four-year-old season ===
Papal Bull was well beaten on his first two starts as a four-year-old finishing fourth to Sixties Icon in the Jockey Club Stakes at Newmarket on 6 May and then running fifth behind Take A Bow in the Brigadier Gerard Stakes at Sandown Park later that month. Ryan Moore took the ride when the colt started at odds of 11/1 for the Group 2 Princess of Wales's Stakes over one and a half miles on good to firm ground at Newmarket on 12 July. Sixties Icon started favourite while the other ten runners included Lucarno and Laverock (Prix d'Ispahan). After being restrained by Moore in the early stages he began to make progress approaching the final quarter mile and took the lead a furlong out. Despite hanging left and then right in the closing stages he kept on well to win by two and a half lengths from Laverock. After the race Stoute said "He's been a very, very consistent horse but we were baffled after he ran at Sandown but he wasn't right afterwards".

In August Papal Bull was moved up in distance for the Geoffrey Freer Stakes over thirteen and a half furlongs at Newbury Racecourse and started the 6/4 favourite ahead of Classic Punch (Fred Archer Stakes). Ridden by Moore, he took the lead approaching the final furlong and drew away to win "comfortably" by four lengths from Shahin. Moore commented "He's got his quirks, but you've just got to let him get on with it. If he wants to do it, he will".

At the same track in September he started favourite for the Dubai Duty Free Arc Trial over eleven furlongs but despite a strong late run he finished third, beaten a neck and a short head by Halicarnassus and Soapy Danger. For his final run of the year the colt was sent to Tokyo Racecourse to contest the Japan Cup on 25 November and went off a 51/1 outsider in an eighteen-runner field. He started lowly and never looked likely to win but stayed on well in the straight to finish seventh, five lengths behind the winner Admire Moon.

Papal Bull's rating of 116 in the 2007 World Thoroughbred Racehorse Rankings made him the 112th best racehorse in the world.

=== 2008: five-year-old season ===
In early 2008 the horse's ownership passed to the Papal Bull Syndicate. On his first run as a five-year-old Papal Bull contested the Coronation Cup at Epsom Racecourse on 6 June and came home fourth of the eleven runners behind Soldier of Fortune, Youmzain and Macarthur. On 10 July he was made the 2/1 favourite as he attempted to repeat his 2007 success in the Princess of Wales's Stakes but was beaten into second place by Lucarno having struggled to obtain a clear run in the last quarter mile. Sixteen day after his defeat at Newmarket, Papal Bull started a 14/1 outsider for the King George VI and Queen Elizabeth Stakes at Ascot and was ridden by Olivier Peslier in what proved to be the best performance of the horse's career. After being restrained at the rear of the eight-runner field he was switched to the outside and swept past his rivals, overtaking the odds-on favourite Duke of Marmalade to take the lead inside the final furlong. Duke of Marmalade however, rallied in the final strides, regained the advantage and won by half a length. There was a gap of nine lengths back to Youmzain in third while the other beaten horses included Lucarno, Ask and Macarthur. When interviewed after the race Peslier smiled, shrugged and commented "He is good, and a bit of a monkey too. Another time, I come even later. Maybe I even win".

In August Papal Bull was sent to Germany and started 4/9 favourite for the Rheinland-Pokal over 2400 metres but finished a distant third behind Oriental Tiger and Kamsin. He was later promoted to second as the "winner" failed a dope test. On 5 October he ran in the Prix de l'Arc de Triomphe at Longchamp Racecourse but made no impression as he came home twelfth behind Zarkava. Papal Bull ended his racing career on 30 November with a second crack at the Japan Cup but ran unplaced behind Screen Hero beaten eight lengths by the winner.

In the 2008 World Thoroughbred Rankings Papal Bull was given a rating of 124, making him the thirteenth-best racehorse in the world.

== Stud career ==
At the end of his racing career Papal Bull was retired to become a breeding stallion. He sired numerous minor winners both on the flat and over jumps but no top-class performers.

== Pedigree ==
Pedigree of Papal Bull (GB), bay stallion, 2003
Sire Montjeu (IRE) 1996	Sadler's Wells (USA); 1981	Northern Dancer (CAN)	Nearctic
Sire Montjeu (IRE) 1996	Sadler's Wells (USA); 1981	Northern Dancer (CAN)	Natalma (USA)
Sire Montjeu (IRE) 1996	Sadler's Wells (USA); 1981	Fairy Bridge	Bold Reason
Sire Montjeu (IRE) 1996	Sadler's Wells (USA); 1981	Fairy Bridge	Special
Sire Montjeu (IRE) 1996	Floripedes (FR); 1985	Top Ville (IRE)	High Top
Sire Montjeu (IRE) 1996	Floripedes (FR); 1985	Top Ville (IRE)	Sega Ville (FR)
Sire Montjeu (IRE) 1996	Floripedes (FR); 1985	Toute Cy	Tennyson
Sire Montjeu (IRE) 1996	Floripedes (FR); 1985	Toute Cy	Adele Toumignon (IRE)
Dam Mialuna (GB) 1997	Zafonic (USA); 1990	Gone West	Mr. Prospector
Dam Mialuna (GB) 1997	Zafonic (USA); 1990	Gone West	Secrettame
Dam Mialuna (GB) 1997	Zafonic (USA); 1990	Zaizafon	The Minstrel (CAN)
Dam Mialuna (GB) 1997	Zafonic (USA); 1990	Zaizafon	Mofida (GB)
Dam Mialuna (GB) 1997	Mamaluna (USA); 1986	Roberto	Hail To Reason
Dam Mialuna (GB) 1997	Mamaluna (USA); 1986	Roberto	Bramalea
Dam Mialuna (GB) 1997	Mamaluna (USA); 1986	Kadesh	Lucky Mel
Dam Mialuna (GB) 1997	Mamaluna (USA); 1986	Kadesh	News Release (Family: 2-o)
