= Darjina =

French Thoroughbred racehorse

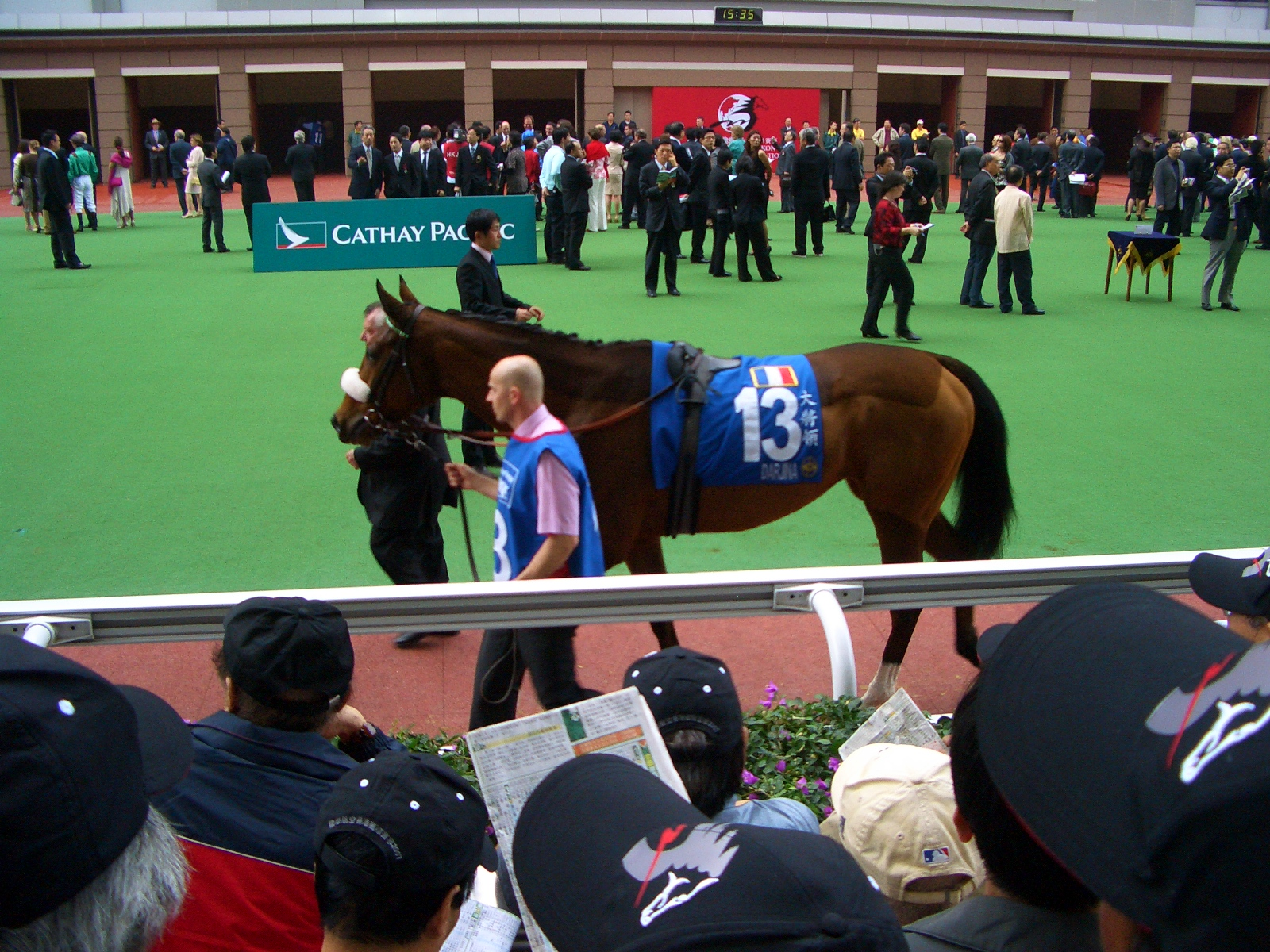
- Darjina in 2007
- Sire: Zamindar
- Grandsire: Gone West
- Dam: Darinska
- Damsire: Zilzal
- Sex: Mare
- Foaled: 13 February 2004
- Country: France
- Colour: Bay
- Breeder: Zahra Aga Khan
- Owner: Zahra Aga Khan
- Trainer: Alain de Royer-Dupré
- Record: 14: 5-6-2
- Earnings: £1,334,112

Major wins
- Prix de la Grotte (2007); Poule d'Essai des Pouliches (2007); Prix d'Astarte (2007); Prix du Moulin (2007)

Awards
- Top-rated European three-year-old filly (2007); Top-rated European older female (2008)

Darjina (foaled 13 February 2004) was a French Thoroughbred racehorse. After winning her only race as a juvenile she improved to become one of the best three-year-old fillies in Europe in 2007, winning the Prix de la Grotte, Poule d'Essai des Pouliches, Prix d'Astarte and Prix du Moulin. In 2008 she compiled an unusual record: competing exclusively at the highest level she finished second in all of six of her races. She was rated the best horse of her age and sex in Europe in both 2007 and 2008.

== Background ==
Darjina was a bay mare with a large white star and a white sock on her left foreleg, bred in France by her owner Zahra Aga Khan. She was trained during her track career by Alain de Royer-Dupré and was ridden in most of her races by Christophe Soumillon.

Her sire Zamindar was a full-brother to Zafonic and recorded his biggest win in the Group Three Prix de Cabourg. He became a very successful sire of fillies, with his offspring including the multiple Group One winners Zarkava and Timepiece. Darjina's dam Darinska showed some racing ability, winning one minor race and running third in the Prix de Royaumont. She was a great-granddaughter of Darazina, whose other descendants have included Darsi, Daryakana, Darlan, Almanzor and Daryaba (Prix de Diane).

== Racing career ==
=== 2006: two-year-old season ===
Darjina was ridden by Michael Poirier when she made her debut in a minor race over 1600 metres on Saint-Cloud Racecourse on 3 November and won "easily" by one and a half lengths.

=== 2007: three-year-old season ===
On 15 April 2007 Darjina began her second campaign by starting the 1.8/1 favourite for the Group 3 Prix de la Grotte over 1600 metres at Longchamp Racecourse. After racing in second place for most of the way she took the lead 100 metres from the finish and won by a short neck and a length from Missvinski and Chinandega. Four weeks later she was stepped up in class for the Group 1 Poule d'Essai des Pouliches over the same course and distance and started the 6.5/1 second favourite behind the Irish filly Finsceal Beo. Of the other eleven runners, the only ones to start at less than 25/1 were Sender Camillo (Cherry Hinton Stakes), Peace Dream (undefeated in four races) and Rahiyah. After being restrained towards the rear of the field Darjina began to make steady progress on the outside in the straight. She moved into second behind Finsceal Beo 200 metres from the finish and caught the favourite on the line to win by a head. After the race Soumillon said "She accelerated brilliantly. She ran a bit green but that is understandable. I didn`t think I had a chance when I got her free of the pack, but she simply would not be beaten and she will go on to even better things".

In June Darjina was sent to England to contest the Coronation Stakes over one mile at Royal Ascot in which she started at odds of 7/2 and finished third behind Indian Ink and the German 1000 Guineas Mi Emma. The filly returned to France and was matched against older fillies and mares in the Prix d'Astarte (a race promoted to Group 1 level for the first time) over 1600 metres on soft ground at Deauville Racecourse on 29 July. She was ridden by Thierry Thulliez as Christophe Soumillon was serving a suspension for excessive use of the whip. She started joint-favourite alongside Simply Perfect in a twelve-runner field which also included Mi Emma, All Is Vanity (Prix de Sandringham), Utrecht (Prix Chloé) and Impressionnante (2006 Prix de Sandringham). Racing closer to the pace than in most of her previous races, Darjina went to the front 400 metres out and repelled several challengers before winning by half a length from Missvinski with Simply Perfect the same distance away in third. Alain de Royer-Dupré commented "Christophe divulged everything to Thulliez before the race and I thank him for being such a sportsman. This filly always finds something at the end of her races and she has plenty of stamina".

On 9 September Darjina faced top class male opposition for the first time in the Prix du Moulin over 1600 metres at Longchamp and with Soumillon back in the saddle she was made the 4.5/1 third choice in the betting behind George Washington and Ramonti. The other seven runners included Turtle Bowl (Prix Jean Prat) and Astronomer Royal (Poule d'Essai des Poulains). After racing in third place behind Archipenko and Ramonti Darjina went to the front approaching the last 200 metres and pulled away to win by two lengths. Ramonti took second ahead of George Washington and Linngari. Three weeks later the filly was sent to Ascot for the second time to contest the Queen Elizabeth II Stakes but ran poorly and came home last of the seven runners behind Ramonti.

For her final run of the year, Darjina was sent to Sha Tin Racecourse for the Hong Kong Mile on 9 December. She produced a strong late run to finish third of the thirteen runners behind Good Ba Ba and Creachadoir.

In the 2007 World Thoroughbred Racehorse Rankings was given a rating of 122, level with Peeping Fawn and Sagara and one pound inferior to Rags to Riches. She was therefore rated the seventeenth-best racehorse in the world and the equal-best filly in Europe.

=== 2008: four-year-old season ===
On her four-year-old debut, Darjina was sent to the United Arab Emirates to contest the Dubai Duty Free over 1900 metres at Nad Al Sheba Racecourse on 29 March. Starting at odds of 5/1 in a field which included Bullish Luck, Creachadoir, Finsceal Beo and Vodka she took the lead in the closing stages but was caught on the line and beaten half a length by the 50/1 outsider Jay Peg. On her return to Europe the filly started 4/5 favourite for the Prix d'Ispahan at Longchamp in May but was beaten into second by Sageburg. In June she ran for the second time at Royal Ascot and was beaten a head by the Australian horse Haradasun in the Queen Anne Stakes. On 2 August Darjina faced the leading three-year-old fillies Natagora, Goldikova and Nahoodh as she attempted to replicate her 2007 victory in the Prix d'Astarte (renamed the Prix Rothschild). After being restrained towards the rear by Soumillon she finished strongly but failed to overhaul Goldikova and finished second, beaten half a length. In the Prix du Moulin on 7 September Darjina was matched against Goldikova again with the same result: she was beaten half a length into second with Paco Boy, Sageburg, Henrythenavigator and Natagora finishing behind. Richard Hughes took the ride when Darjina was sent to Newmarket Racecourse on 4 October for her final race and started 11/10 favourite for the Sun Chariot Stakes. She finished second of the ten runners after failing by half a length to catch the front-running Halfway to Heaven.

Despaite failing to win a race in 2008 Darjina was given a rating of 119 in the 2008 World Thoroughbred Rankings, making her the 52nd best racehorse in the world and the top-rated older female in Europe.

On 13 October 2008 it was announced that Darjina had been retired from racing.

== Pedigree ==
Pedigree of Darjina, bay mare, 2004
Sire Zamindar (USA) 1998	Gone West (USA); 1994	Mr. Prospector	Raise a Native
Sire Zamindar (USA) 1998	Gone West (USA); 1994	Mr. Prospector	Gold Digger
Sire Zamindar (USA) 1998	Gone West (USA); 1994	Secretame	Secretariat
Sire Zamindar (USA) 1998	Gone West (USA); 1994	Secretame	Tamerett
Sire Zamindar (USA) 1998	Zaizafon (USA); 1982	The Minstrel (CAN)	Northern Dancer
Sire Zamindar (USA) 1998	Zaizafon (USA); 1982	The Minstrel (CAN)	Fleur
Sire Zamindar (USA) 1998	Zaizafon (USA); 1982	Mofida (GB)	Right Tack
Sire Zamindar (USA) 1998	Zaizafon (USA); 1982	Mofida (GB)	Wold Lass
Dam Darinska (IRE) 1999	Zilzal (USA); 1986	Nureyev	Northern Dancer (CAN)
Dam Darinska (IRE) 1999	Zilzal (USA); 1986	Nureyev	Special
Dam Darinska (IRE) 1999	Zilzal (USA); 1986	French Charmer	Le Fabuleux (FR)
Dam Darinska (IRE) 1999	Zilzal (USA); 1986	French Charmer	Bold Example
Dam Darinska (IRE) 1999	Daralbayda; 1993	Doyoun	Mill Reef (USA)
Dam Darinska (IRE) 1999	Daralbayda; 1993	Doyoun	Dumka (FR)
Dam Darinska (IRE) 1999	Daralbayda; 1993	Daralinsha (USA)	Empery
Dam Darinska (IRE) 1999	Daralbayda; 1993	Daralinsha (USA)	Darazina (FR) (Family: 1-e)

- Darjina was inbred 4 × 4 to Northern Dancer, meaning that this stallion appears twice in the fourth generation of her pedigree.
