= Literato =

French-bred Thoroughbred racehorse

- Sire: Kendor
- Grandsire: Kenmare
- Dam: La Cibeles
- Damsire: Cardoun
- Sex: Stallion
- Foaled: 18 January 2004
- Country: France
- Colour: Gray
- Breeder: B S H of Administrativa
- Owner: Hervé Morin; Godolphin
- Trainer: Jean-Claude Rouget; Saeed bin Suroor
- Record: 13: 9-2-0
- Earnings: £624,786

Major wins
- Prix La Force (2007); Prix Guillaume d'Ornano (2007); Prix du Prince d'Orange (2007); Champion Stakes (2007)

Awards
- Timeform rating 127

Honours
- Top-rated French three-year-old (2007)

Literato (foaled 18 January 2004) is a French Thoroughbred racehorse and sire. After being undefeated in five relatively minor races as a two-year-old he emerged as one of the best colts of his generation in Europe in 2007, winning the Prix La Force, Prix Guillaume d'Ornano and Prix du Prince d'Orange in France before recording his biggest win when sent to England for the Champion Stakes. He ran poorly in two races as a four-year-old and was retired to stud.

== Background ==
Literato is a small grey horse standing 15.2 hands high bred in France by B S H of Administrativa. He was sired by Kendor, whose wins included the Grand Critérium and the Poule d'Essai des Poulains before being retired to stud where his other winners included the Lockinge Stakes winner Keltos.

In August 2005 the yearling colt was consigned by the Haras de la Reboursiere to the Deauville sale where he was bought for €40,000 by the trainer Jean-Claude Rouget. The horse entered the ownership of Hervé Morin and was trained by Rouget at Pau.

== Racing career ==
=== 2006: two-year-old season ===
As a two-year-old Literato was unbeaten in five races, although he competed mainly at minor tracks in the French provinces. After dead-heating over 1100 metres on his debut at Tarbes on 1 May he won over 1400 metres at Vichy in July and then won over 1600 metres in a more competitive event at Deauville Racecourse in August. In the last-named event he won by two and a half lengths from Thousand Stars who went on to win two editions of the Grande Course de Haies d'Auteuil. In his last two races of the season Literato was moved up to Listed class. He won the Criterium de Lyon at Lyon-Parilly in September and the Criterium du Languedoc at Toulouse on 11 November.

=== 2007: three-year-old season ===
In 2007, Literato was ridden in all of his races by Christophe Lemaire who had partnered him at Deauville in the previous season. He began his second season in the Listed Prix Omnium II over 1600 metres at Saint-Cloud Racecourse on 23 March and finished second of the five runners, two lengths behind Hurricane Fly and three lengths ahead of Spirit One (later to win the Arlington Million). He was then moved up in class and distance for the Group Three Prix La Force over 2000 metres at Longchamp Racecourse on 15 May and started 3/1 second favourite behind the Aidan O'Brien-trained Chinese Whisper. After being restrained at the back of the six-runner field before moving forward on the outside in the straight, taking the lead 100 metres from the finish and beating Chinese Whisper by three quarters of a length. After the race Rouget said that the winner "certainly appreciated this longer distance. He has a super action for such a little horse".

On 3 June Literato started 9/1 fourth choice in the betting for 170th running of the Group One Prix du Jockey Club over 2100 metres at Chantilly Racecourse. The 4/1 joint-favourites were the Prix de Guiche winner Lawman and the British-trained colt Raincoat (runner-up to Authorized in the Dante Stakes) with the unbeaten Zambezi Sun third choice on 6/1. He was again held up by Lemaire before moving forward in the straight and made steady progress to finish second of the twenty runners, one and a half lengths behind Lawman. After a two and a half month break, Literato returned in the Group Two Prix Guillaume d'Ornano over 2000 metres at Deauville on 18 August and started favourite at odds of 6/5. As usual, Literato raced at the back of the field and was still ninth of the ten runners on the final turn. He made rapid progress in the straight and took the lead in the closing stages to win by half a length from Spirit One. Rouget called the winner "a super horse, a real phenomenon" whilst the Racing Post's correspondent called the colt's finishing run "spectacular".

At Longchamp on 22 September, Literato started odds-on favourite for the Group Three Prix du Prince d'Orange despite conceding weight to his five opponents. Lemaire employed the customary tactics, holding the colt up in the early stages before producing a strong late run. Literato took the lead 200 metres out and won "comfortably" by three quarters of a length from Indian Choice. Four weeks later Literato was sent to England to contest the Group One Champion Stakes over ten furlongs at Newmarket Racecourse and started 7/2 second favourite behind Notnowcato a four-year-old who had won the Eclipse Stakes and the Tattersalls Gold Cup. The other runners included Eagle Mountain (ridden by Johnny Murtagh), Speciosa, Mount Nelson, Multidimensional (Prix Guillaume d'Ornano, Rose of Lancaster Stakes), Creachadoir (Tetrarch Stakes, Joel Stakes), Doctor Dino (Man o' War Stakes) and Maraahel (Hardwicke Stakes). Literato was held up as usual before making rapid progress in the last quarter mile and moved up to take the lead from Eagle Mountain in the final furlong. Eagle Mountain rallied in the final strides, but Literato maintained a narrow advantage to win by a short head, with a gap of three lengths back to Doctor Dino in third. After the race, Morin said "He is a very courageous horse, and he likes a battle. I would have liked to run him in the Arc de Triomphe, but Jean-Claude said 'No, we will win the Champion Stakes'." Lemaire commented "I feel great on this track and have had some nice victories. The horse travelled very well all the way. I know that my horse is a fighter – I thought I would win easier but Johnny's horse was very tough."

=== 2008: four-year-old season ===
Before the start of the 2008 season, Literato was sold privately to Godolphin and joined the stable of Saeed bin Suroor. He failed to reproduce his best form for his new connections, finishing twelfth when favourite for the Dubai Duty Free, and then running last of six behind Sageburg in the Prix d'Ispahan at Longchamp in May.

== Assessment ==
In the 2007 World Thoroughbred Racehorse Rankings Literato was rated the thirteenth best racehorse in the world and the best three-year-old trained in France. He was rated 127 by the independent Timeform organisation.

== Stud career ==
Literato was retired from racing to become a breeding stallion at the Haras de La Reboursiere et de Montaigu near Nonant-le-Pin in Orne. By far the best of his progeny to date has been the filly Alterite who won the Grade I Garden City Stakes at Belmont Park in 2013.

== Pedigree ==
Pedigree of Literato (FR), grey horse, 2004
Sire Kendor (FR) 1986	Kenmare (FR); 1975	Kalamoun	Zeddaan
Sire Kendor (FR) 1986	Kenmare (FR); 1975	Kalamoun	Khairunissa
Sire Kendor (FR) 1986	Kenmare (FR); 1975	Belle of Ireland	Milesian
Sire Kendor (FR) 1986	Kenmare (FR); 1975	Belle of Ireland	Belle of the Ball
Sire Kendor (FR) 1986	Belle Mecene (FR); 1982	Gay Mecene	Vaguely Noble
Sire Kendor (FR) 1986	Belle Mecene (FR); 1982	Gay Mecene	Gay Missile
Sire Kendor (FR) 1986	Belle Mecene (FR); 1982	Djaka Belle	Djakao
Sire Kendor (FR) 1986	Belle Mecene (FR); 1982	Djaka Belle	Orleans Belle
Dam La Cibeles (FR) 1997	Cardoun (FR); 1989	Kaldoun	Caro
Dam La Cibeles (FR) 1997	Cardoun (FR); 1989	Kaldoun	Katana
Dam La Cibeles (FR) 1997	Cardoun (FR); 1989	Cable Car	Fabulous Dancer
Dam La Cibeles (FR) 1997	Cardoun (FR); 1989	Cable Car	Bay Area
Dam La Cibeles (FR) 1997	Douberta (FR); 1989	Don Roberto	Roberto
Dam La Cibeles (FR) 1997	Douberta (FR); 1989	Don Roberto	Exit Smiling
Dam La Cibeles (FR) 1997	Douberta (FR); 1989	Dourenne	Amadou
Dam La Cibeles (FR) 1997	Douberta (FR); 1989	Dourenne	La Varenne (Family 16-a)
