= George Washington (horse) =

Irish-bred Thoroughbred racehorse

- Racing silks of Susan Magnier
- Sire: Danehill
- Grandsire: Danzig
- Dam: Bordighera
- Damsire: Alysheba
- Sex: Stallion
- Foaled: 2003
- Country: Ireland
- Colour: bay
- Breeder: Roy and Gretchen Jackson's Lael Stables
- Owner: Susan Magnier, Michael Tabor, Derrick Smith
- Trainer: Aidan O'Brien
- Record: 14: 6-1-4
- Earnings: £805,977

Major wins
- Railway Stakes (2005); Phoenix Stakes (2005); National Stakes (2005); 2,000 Guineas (2006); Queen Elizabeth II Stakes (2006)

Awards
- European Champion Two-Year-Old Colt (2005); European Champion Three-Year-Old Colt (2006)

Honours
- Timeform rating: 133
- Last updated on 22 June 2022

George Washington (3 January 2003 – 27 October 2007) was an Irish thoroughbred racehorse. Having won four Group 1 races including the 2,000 Guineas, he was retired to stud at the end of 2006 only to be brought back to racing in June 2007 after it emerged that he had fertility problems. He suffered a fracture of his right foreleg during the Breeders' Cup Classic at Monmouth Park in the United States on 27 October 2007 and was euthanised on course.

== Background ==
A bay colt with a white blaze, George Washington was bred in Ireland by Roy and Gretchen Jackson. He was a son of champion sire Danehill and Bordighera, a winning daughter of Alysheba. As a yearling, he was sold to Coolmore at Tattersalls October sale for 1,150,000 guineas and went into training with Aidan O'Brien at Ballydoyle.

== Two-year-old career ==
George Washington's debut was in a maiden race over 5 furlongs during the Guineas meeting at Newmarket on 1 May 2005. Starting as 13/8 favourite and ridden by Kieren Fallon, he finished third of ten runners. Victory followed in his second race at the Curragh three weeks later, this time over 6 furlongs. Another win came in the Group 2 Railway Stakes, again over 6 furlongs at the Curragh. The Group 1 Phoenix Stakes was next on the agenda, and George Washington won by 8 lengths from his stablemate Amadeus Mozart, despite having been slightly hampered at the start. His final race as a two-year-old was in the National Stakes over 7 furlongs in September, another Group 1, which he won by 2 lengths as a long odds-on favourite. He had been entered in the Dewhurst Stakes but withdrawn due to the softening of the ground. His performances earned him the 2005 Cartier Award for Two-Year-Old European Champion Colt.

== Three-year-old career ==
The 2,000 Guineas at Newmarket was George Washington's first outing of the season. Aidan O'Brien was attempting to win the race for a fourth time, having previously won with King of Kings in 1998, Rock of Gibraltar in 2002, and Footstepsinthesand in 2005. George Washington started as 6/4 favourite and won, beating subsequent Epsom Derby winner Sir Percy by 2½ lengths. Known for his quirks, he refused to enter the winner's enclosure after the race.

In the Irish 2,000 Guineas, George Washington finished second, beaten two lengths by subsequent dual-Group 1 winner Araafa, who had been fourth at Newmarket. George Washington's finishing acceleration was blunted by the heavy ground conditions, and following the race it emerged that he had pulled muscles, which ruled him out of Royal Ascot. Having recovered from his injury, he returned to the racecourse for the Group 2 Celebration Mile at Goodwood, ridden for the first time by Michael Kinane. He finished third behind Caradak and Killybegs. He returned to his winning ways in the Queen Elizabeth II Stakes at Ascot in September, when he beat Araafa by a length and a quarter. His win earned him the Cartier top Cartier Award for Three-Year-Old European Champion Colt.

After a disappointing run in which he came sixth behind Invasor in the Breeders' Cup Classic at Churchill Downs, Kentucky, in November 2006, George Washington was retired to stud at Coolmore, covering mares for a fee of €60,000.

== Four-year-old career ==
After it became apparent in March 2007 that George Washington had fertility problems, he was returned to training and replaced at Coolmore by Holy Roman Emperor, a three-year-old colt also by Danehill. He returned to the racecourse in the Queen Anne Stakes at Royal Ascot where, ridden by Kinane, he finished fourth behind Ramonti. On his next outing he was ridden for the only time by Seamie Heffernan and finished third in the Eclipse Stakes at Sandown Park, one and a half lengths and a head behind Notnowcato and The Derby winner Authorized. Fallon then reunited with George Washington in the Prix du Moulin de Longchamp in Paris in September. The partnership finished third to the filly Darjina and Godolphin horse Ramonti.

On 27 October 2007, George Washington ran in the Breeders' Cup Classic at Monmouth Park in New Jersey, ridden by Kinane. In sloppy conditions, he broke down 100 yards from the finish. He was found to have an open fracture of both sesamoid bones in his right foreleg and euthanised on the racecourse at the request of his trainer.

== Career summary ==
Date	Race	Track	Location	Distance	Surface	Condition	Finish
1 May 2005	Maiden	Newmarket (Rowley Mile)	Suffolk	5 furlongs (1006 m)	Turf	Good-Firm	3rd
22 May 2005	Maiden	Curragh	Ireland	6 furlongs (1207 m)	Turf	Yielding	1st
26 June 2005	Group 2 Railway Stakes	Curragh	Ireland	6 furlongs (1207 m)	Turf	Good-Firm	1st
7 August 2005	Group 1 Phoenix Stakes	Curragh	Ireland	6 furlongs (1207 m)	Turf	Good	1st
18 September 2005	Group 1 National Stakes	Curragh	Ireland	7 furlongs (1408 m)	Turf	Good	1st
6 May 2006	Group 1 2,000 Guineas	Newmarket (Rowley Mile)	Suffolk	1 mile (1,600 m)	Turf	Good-Firm	1st
27 May 2006	Group 1 Irish 2,000 Guineas	Curragh	Ireland	1 mile (1,600 m)	Turf	Heavy	2nd
27 August 2006	Group 2 Celebration Mile	Goodwood	West Sussex	1 mile (1,600 m)	Turf	Good	3rd
23 September 2006	Group 1 Queen Elizabeth II Stakes	Ascot	Berkshire	1 mile (1,600 m)	Turf	Good-Soft	1st
4 November 2006	Grade 1 Breeders' Cup Classic	Churchill Downs	Louisville, Kentucky	1 1/4 miles (2,000 m)	Dirt	Fast	6th
19 June 2007	Group 1 Queen Anne Stakes	Ascot	Berkshire	1 mile (1,600 m)	Turf	Good	4th
7 July 2007	Group 1 Eclipse Stakes	Sandown Park	Surrey	1 1/4 miles (2,000 m)	Turf	Good-Soft	3rd
9 September 2007	Group 1 Prix du Moulin de Longchamp	Longchamp Racecourse	France	1 mile (1,600 m)	Turf	Good	3rd
27 October 2007	Group 1 Breeders' Cup Classic	Monmouth Park	Oceanport, New Jersey	1 1/4 miles (2,000 m)	Dirt	Sloppy	Did not finish - fractured right foreleg and euthanised on course

== Offspring ==
The only foal from George Washington's short stint at stud was a filly foal out of the mare Flawlessly, born on 4 February 2008. Date With Destiny sold as a yearling for 320,000 guineas and went into training with Richard Hannon. She won on her debut at Newbury in July 2010 and in 2011 finished third in the Listed Lingfield Oaks Trial. Date With Destiny's first foal, Beautiful Morning, won the John Musker Fillies' Stakes in 2017 and the Group 3 Royal Whip Stakes in 2018.

== Pedigree ==
Pedigree of George Washington
Sire Danehill 1986	Danzig; 1977	Northern Dancer; 1961	Nearctic
Sire Danehill 1986	Danzig; 1977	Northern Dancer; 1961	Natalma
Sire Danehill 1986	Danzig; 1977	Pas De Nom; 1968	Admiral's Voyage
Sire Danehill 1986	Danzig; 1977	Pas De Nom; 1968	Petitioner
Sire Danehill 1986	Razyana; 1981	His Majesty; 1968	Ribot
Sire Danehill 1986	Razyana; 1981	His Majesty; 1968	Flower Bowl
Sire Danehill 1986	Razyana; 1981	Spring Adieu; 1974	Buckpasser
Sire Danehill 1986	Razyana; 1981	Spring Adieu; 1974	Natalma
Dam Bordighera 1992	Alysheba; 1984	Alydar; 1975	Raise a Native
Dam Bordighera 1992	Alysheba; 1984	Alydar; 1975	Sweet Tooth
Dam Bordighera 1992	Alysheba; 1984	Bel Sheba; 1970	Lt. Stevens
Dam Bordighera 1992	Alysheba; 1984	Bel Sheba; 1970	Belthazar
Dam Bordighera 1992	Blue Tip; 1982	Tip Moss; 1972	Luthier
Dam Bordighera 1992	Blue Tip; 1982	Tip Moss; 1972	Top Twig
Dam Bordighera 1992	Blue Tip; 1982	As Blue; 1970	Blue Tom
Dam Bordighera 1992	Blue Tip; 1982	As Blue; 1970	As Well
