= Cockney Rebel (horse) =

Irish-bred Thoroughbred racehorse

- Racing silks of Phil Cunningham
- Sire: Val Royal
- Grandsire: Royal Academy
- Dam: Factice
- Damsire: Known Fact
- Sex: Stallion
- Foaled: 16 March 2004
- Country: Ireland
- Colour: Bay
- Breeder: Oak Lodge Bloodstock
- Owner: Phil Cunningham
- Trainer: Geoff Huffer
- Record: 6: 3-1-1
- Earnings: £448,721

Major wins
- 2000 Guineas Stakes (2007); Irish 2,000 Guineas (2007)

Cockney Rebel (16 March 2004 – 23 March 2021) was an Irish-bred, British-trained Thoroughbred racehorse and sire, best known for winning both the 2000 Guineas Stakes and the Irish 2,000 Guineas in the spring of 2007.

== Background ==
Cockney Rebel was a son of Val Royal, winner of the Breeders' Cup Mile (G1) at Belmont Park in New York in 2001. Val Royal's time, 1:32.0, established a new record for the Breeders' Cup Mile and still stands as the second fastest time in the history of the championship race. Val Royal was trained by multiple champion trainer André Fabre in France, where he won the Prix Guillaume d'Ornano (G2) and Prix de Guiche (G3), and by Julio Canani after being exported to California.

Val Royal's sire Royal Academy also won the Breeders' Cup Mile (G1), ridden to victory by Lester Piggott at Belmont Park in 1990. Trained by Dr Vincent O'Brien Royal Academy was a son of the outstanding racehorse and stallion Nijinsky II, also trained by O'Brien and voted European Horse of the Year.

Cockney Rebel's dam Factice, was a winning daughter of European champion miler Known Fact. She raced just twice and as was sold as a broodmare for 240,000 guineas at the Tattersalls December Sales in 1993. Factice was a descendant of the broodmare Rare Exchange, a half-sister of the Belmont Stakes winner Jaipur.

== 2006: two-year-old season ==
As a juvenile Cockney Rebel won his maiden at Newmarket in uncomplicated fashion before stepping up in class to finish second in the Class 2 St Leger Yearling Stakes at York. His final start ended in a third place in Doncaster's Group 2 Champagne Stakes where he was beaten by the high class Vital Equine.

== 2007: three-year-old season ==
Cockney Rebel, ridden by Olivier Peslier, was a 25-1 chance for the 2000 Guineas (G1) at Newmarket in 2007, but beat Vital Equine, his Champagne Stakes (G2) conqueror, by a length and a half. He proved that there was no fluke about the result when he followed up in the Irish 2,000 Guineas (G1) at The Curragh three weeks later, in similarly impressive style. He only the second horse in the previous 15 years (and the sixth in racing history) to win both the English and Irish 2000 Guineas Classics. The last horse to achieve the double Guineas feat was Rock of Gibraltar – who ran a slower time than Cockney Rebel in both races.

A very sharp miler, Cockney Rebel clocked the second fastest time (1:36.1) since modern timings began in the Irish 2,000 Guineas. He beat winners of nine Group One races, including the locally trained champion Duke Of Marmalade, in this classic. His time in the 2,000 Guineas at Newmarket was also excellent, as he stopped the clocks in 1:35.2, the best time in the historic classic since 1995. This time was over two seconds faster than the time superstar Frankel recorded in the same event in 2012.

Sadly, Cockney Rebel suffered a pelvic injury when beaten as the even money favourite in the St James's Palace Stakes at Ascot and this proved to be his final race. He had been reported to be working well ahead of his planned reappearance but suffered a bizarre injury on the gallops when a piece of paper blew across the field and hit his near fore on the tendon. The news that it would take three months to heal prompted his connections to retire him.

== Stud record ==
He retired to stud in 2008–13 to The National Stud in Newmarket. He moved to France and was at stud in 2014–16 at Haras de Saint Arnoult Normandy and at stud in 2016–18 at Haras du Thenney, Normandy he moved back to England and was at stud in 2019–20 at Batsford Stud, Gloucestershire, England. He died on 23 March 2021. The most successful of his progeny to date has been the hurdler Cockney Sparrow.

== Pedigree ==
Pedigree of Cockney Rebel, bay stallion, 2004
Sire Val Royal (FR) 1996	Royal Academy (USA); 1987	Nijinsky	Northern Dancer
Sire Val Royal (FR) 1996	Royal Academy (USA); 1987	Nijinsky	Flaming Page
Sire Val Royal (FR) 1996	Royal Academy (USA); 1987	Crimson Saint	Crimson Satan
Sire Val Royal (FR) 1996	Royal Academy (USA); 1987	Crimson Saint	Bolero Rose
Sire Val Royal (FR) 1996	Vadlava (FR); 1984	Bikala	Kalamoun
Sire Val Royal (FR) 1996	Vadlava (FR); 1984	Bikala	Irish Bird
Sire Val Royal (FR) 1996	Vadlava (FR); 1984	Vadsa	Halo
Sire Val Royal (FR) 1996	Vadlava (FR); 1984	Vadsa	Rainbow's Edge
Dam Factice (USA) 1993	Known Fact (USA); 1977	In Reality	Intentionally
Dam Factice (USA) 1993	Known Fact (USA); 1977	In Reality	My Dear Girl
Dam Factice (USA) 1993	Known Fact (USA); 1977	Tamerett	Tim Tam
Dam Factice (USA) 1993	Known Fact (USA); 1977	Tamerett	Mixed Marriage
Dam Factice (USA) 1993	Wacky Princess (USA); 1986	Miswaki	Mr. Prospector
Dam Factice (USA) 1993	Wacky Princess (USA); 1986	Miswaki	Hopespringseternal
Dam Factice (USA) 1993	Wacky Princess (USA); 1986	Cornish Princess	Cornish Prince
Dam Factice (USA) 1993	Wacky Princess (USA); 1986	Cornish Princess	Rare Exchange (Family: 8-c)
