= Cumberland Lodge Stakes =

Flat horse race in Britain

- Class: Group 3
- Location: Ascot Racecourse; Ascot, England
- Inaugurated: 1951
- Race type: Flat / Thoroughbred
- Sponsor: BetMGM
- Website: Ascot

Race information
- Distance: 1m 3f 211y (2,406 metres)
- Surface: Turf
- Track: Right-handed
- Qualification: Four-years-old and up
- Weight: 9 st 0 lb (3yo); 9 st 6 lb (4yo+); Allowances; 3 lb for fillies and mares Penalties; 7 lb for Group 1 winners * 5 lb for Group 2 winners * 3 lb for Group 3 winners * * after 31 March
- Purse: £85,000 (2025); 1st: £48,204

Cumberland Lodge Stakes
2026
Al Aasy	Royal Playwright	Tenability

Previous years
2025
Al Qareem	Tenability	Hamish
2024
Al Qareem	Al Aasy	Layfayette
2023
Al Qareem	Israr	Postileo
2022
Hamish	Cresta	Candleford
2021
Hukum	Eagles By Day	Ilaraab

2020-2011
2020
Euchen Glen	Desert Encounter	Highland Chief
2019
Morando	Sextant	Vivid Diamond
2018
Laraaib	Communique	First Eleven
2018
Laraaib	Communique	First Eleven
2017
Danehill Kodiac	Waldgeist	Secret Number
2016
Move Up	Arab Spring	Kings Fete
2015
Star Storm	Missed Call	Hillstar
2014
Pether's Moon	Parish Hall	Encke
2013
Secret Number	Royal Empire	Gatewood
2012
Hawaafez	Camborne	Willing Foe
2011
Quest For Peace	Arctic Cosmos	Nanton

2010-2001
2010
Laaheb	Whispering Gallery	Monitor Closely
2009
Mawatheeq	Campanologist	Kingdom Of Fife
2008
Sixties Icon	Sugar Ray	Ajhar
2007
Ask	Zaham	Honolulu
2006
Young Mick	Munsef	Glistening
2005
Mubtaker	Self Defense	Compton Bolter
2004
High Accolade	Self Defense	Bandari
2003
High Accolade	Compton Bolter	Indian Creek
2002
Systematic	Warrsan	Frankies Dream
2001
Nayef	Sagittarius	Boreas

2000-1991
2000
Mutamam	Happy Change	King O' The Mana
1998
Capri	Rabah	Sasuru
1997
Kingfisher Mill	Romanov	King Sound
1996
Wall Street	Salmon Ladder	Priolina
1995
Riyadian	Richard Of York	Burooj
1994
Wagon Master	Urgent Request	Blush Rambler
1993
Prince Of Andros	Bobzao	Muhayaa
1992
Opera House	Red Bishop	Garden Of Heaven
1991
Drum Taps	Rock Hopper	Young Buster

1990-1988
1990
Ile De Nisky	Cacoethes	Alphabel
1989
Tralos	Husyan	Warrshan
1988
Assatis	Top Class	Almaarad

The Cumberland Lodge Stakes is a Group 3 flat horse race in Great Britain open to horses aged four years or older. It is run at Ascot over a distance of 1 mile 3 furlongs and 211 yards (2,406 metres), and it is scheduled to take place each year in early October. Prior to 2026 it was also open to horses aged three years.

== History ==
The event is named after Cumberland Lodge, the location of a successful 18th-century stud. It was the birthplace of the racehorses Herod and Eclipse.

The Cumberland Lodge Stakes was established in 1951, and it was initially contested over two miles. It was shortened by half a mile in 1952.

The race was titled the John Collier Stakes in 1965, and the David Robinson Stakes in 1967. The present system of race grading was introduced in 1971, and the event was classed at Group 3 level.

The Cumberland Lodge Stakes was formerly held in September, but it was switched to early October in 2011.

== Records ==
Most successful horse (3 wins):

- Al Qareem - 2023, 2024, 2025

Leading jockey (7 wins):

- Lester Piggott – Park Top (1970), Knockroe (1971, 1972), Scottish Rifle (1973), Calaba (1975), Bruni (1976), Critique (1981)
- Pat Eddery – Orange Bay (1977), Fordham (1978), Fingal's Cave (1980), Lafontaine (1982), Moon Madness (1987), Assatis (1988), Tralos (1989)

Leading trainer (6 wins):

- Marcus Tregoning – Nayef (2001), High Accolade (2003, 2004), Mubtaker (2005), Mawatheeq (2009), Hawaafez (2012)

== Winners ==
Year	Winner	Age	Jockey	Trainer	Time
1951	Talma II	3	Rae Johnstone	Marcel Boussac	3:41.00
1952	Rawson	3	Ken Gethin	Stanley Wootton	2:41.20
1953	Aureole	3	Eph Smith	Cecil Boyd-Rochfort	2:37.40
1954	Elopement	3	Charlie Smirke	Noel Murless	3:03.60
1955	Daemon	3	Geoff Lewis	David Sherbrooke	2:46.26
1956 (Note: The 1956 running was held at Kempton Park Racecourse)	Le Pretendant	3	Stan Clayton	Walter Nightingall	2:37.40
1957	Doutelle	3	Harry Carr	Cecil Boyd-Rochfort	2:39.54
1958	Mon Fetiche	3	Willie Snaith	Humphrey Cottrill	2:51.54
1959	Aggressor	4	Jimmy Lindley	Towser Gosden	2:42.08
1960 (Note: The 1960 running was held at Kempton Park Racecourse)	High Perch	4	Jimmy Lindley	Towser Gosden	2:52.00
1961	Hot Brandy	3	Duncan Keith	Walter Nightingall	2:41.46
1962	Silver Cloud	4	Ron Hutchinson	Jack Jarvis	2:40.02
1963 (Note: The 1963 running was held at Kempton Park Racecourse)	Wily Trout	3	Doug Smith	Charlie Weld	2:38.20
1964	King Chestnut	6	Scobie Breasley	Arthur Budgett	2:45.74
1965	Super Sam	3	Jimmy Lindley	Jack Watts	2:37.40
1966	no race
1967	Sucaryl	3	George Moore	Noel Murless	2:41.80
1968	Chicago	4	Ron Hutchinson	Harry Wragg	2:47.40
1969	Remand	4	Joe Mercer	Dick Hern	2:31.83
1970	Park Top	6	Lester Piggott	Bernard van Cutsem	2:33.50
1971	Knockroe	3	Lester Piggott	Peter Nelson	2:37.94
1972	Knockroe	4	Lester Piggott	Peter Nelson	2:10.06
1973	Scottish Rifle	4	Lester Piggott	John Dunlop	2:18.86
1974	Shebeen	3	Geoff Baxter	Bruce Hobbs	2:43.36
1975	Calaba	5	Lester Piggott	David Morley	2:33.04
1976	Bruni	4	Lester Piggott	Ryan Price	2:34.13
1977	Orange Bay	5	Pat Eddery	Peter Walwyn	2:35.57
1978	Fordham	3	Pat Eddery	Vincent O'Brien	2:35.62
1979	Main Reef	3	Joe Mercer	Henry Cecil	2:37.25
1980	Fingal's Cave	3	Pat Eddery	John Dunlop	2:35.89
1981	Critique	3	Lester Piggott	Henry Cecil	2:32.84
1982	Lafontaine	5	Pat Eddery	Clive Brittain	2:38.39
1983	Band	3	Willie Carson	Dick Hern	2:33.50
1984	Bedtime	4	Willie Carson	Dick Hern	2:35.35
1985	Shardari	3	Walter Swinburn	Michael Stoute	2:29.90
1986	Kazaroun	4	Walter Swinburn	Michael Stoute	2:36.59
1987	Moon Madness	4	Pat Eddery	John Dunlop	2:35.36
1988	Assatis	3	Pat Eddery	Guy Harwood	2:31.86
1989	Tralos	4	Pat Eddery	Guy Harwood	2:31.20
1990	Ile de Nisky	4	Gary Carter	Geoff Huffer	2:31.04
1991	Drum Taps	5	Frankie Dettori	Lord Huntingdon	2:34.73
1992	Opera House	4	Steve Cauthen	Michael Stoute	2:40.47
1993	Prince of Andros	3	Frankie Dettori	David Loder	2:40.55
1994	Wagon Master	4	Willie Carson	Alec Stewart	2:33.66
1995	Riyadian	3	Richard Quinn	Paul Cole	2:32.28
1996	Wall Street	3	Frankie Dettori	Saeed bin Suroor	2:31.09
1997	Kingfisher Mill	3	Michael Kinane	Julie Cecil	2:31.71
1998	Capri	3	Kieren Fallon	Henry Cecil	2:31.69
1999	Abandoned due to waterlogging
2000	Mutamam	5	Richard Hills	Alec Stewart	2:35.48
2001	Nayef	3	Willie Supple	Marcus Tregoning	2:39.70
2002	Systematic	3	Darryll Holland	Mark Johnston	2:32.00
2003	High Accolade	3	Martin Dwyer	Marcus Tregoning	2:35.59
2004	High Accolade	4	Martin Dwyer	Marcus Tregoning	2:33.21
2005 (Note: The 2005 edition was held at Newmarket)	Mubtaker	8	Richard Hills	Marcus Tregoning	2:32.47
2006	Young Mick	4	Robert Winston	George Margarson	2:34.56
2007	Ask	4	Ryan Moore	Sir Michael Stoute	2:34.47
2008	Sixties Icon	5	Frankie Dettori	Jeremy Noseda	2:33.68
2009	Mawatheeq	4	Richard Hills	Marcus Tregoning	2:27.33
2010	Laaheb	4	Richard Hills	Michael Jarvis	2:34.32
2011	Quest for Peace	3	Kieren Fallon	Luca Cumani	2:33.36
2012	Hawaafez	4	Johnny Murtagh	Marcus Tregoning	2:37.67
2013	Secret Number	3	Silvestre de Sousa	Saeed bin Suroor	2:35.03
2014	Pether's Moon	4	Pat Dobbs	Richard Hannon Jr.	2:40.73
2015	Star Storm	3	Tom Queally	James Fanshawe	2:32.30
2016	Move Up	3	William Buick	Saeed bin Suroor	2:37.93
2017	Danehill Kodiac	4	Sean Levey	Richard Hannon Jr.	2:40.02
2018	Laraaib	4	Jim Crowley	Owen Burrows	2:41.23
2019	Morando	6	Silvestre de Sousa	Andrew Balding	2:40.07
2020 (Note: The 2020 race was run at York after the original Ascot fixture was abandoned due to waterlogging)	Euchen Glen	7	Paul Mulrennan	Jim Goldie	2:37.26
2021	Hukum	4	Jim Crowley	Owen Burrows	2:40.06
2022	Hamish	6	Pat Dobbs	William Haggas	2:36.94
2023	Al Qareem	4	Clifford Lee	Karl Burke	2:32.66
2024	Al Qareem	5	Clifford Lee	Karl Burke	2:37.86
2025	Al Qareem	6	Clifford Lee	Karl Burke	2:39.34
2026	Al Aasy	9	Danny Tudhope	William Haggas	2:34.97

== See also ==
- Horse racing in Great Britain
- List of British flat horse races
