= John Porter Stakes =

Flat horse race in Britain

John Porter Stakes (Dubai Duty Free Finest Surprise Stakes)
- Class: Group 3
- Location: Newbury Racecourse; Newbury, England
- Inaugurated: 1928
- Race type: Flat / Thoroughbred
- Sponsor: Dubai Duty Free
- Website: Newbury

Race information
- Distance: 1m 4f (2,414 m)
- Surface: Turf
- Track: Left-handed
- Qualification: Four-years-old and up
- Weight: 9 st 0 lb Allowances; 3 lb for fillies and mares Penalties; 7 lb for Group 1 winners * 5 lb for Group 2 winners * 3 lb for Group 3 winners * *since 31 August last year
- Purse: £83,615 (2025); 1st: £48,203

John Porter Stakes
2026
Convergent	Al Aasy	Tenability

Previous years
2025
Divina Grace	Tabletalk	Sunway
2024
Hamish	Al Qareem	Salt Bay
2023
Grand Alliance	Farhan	Max Vega
2022
Max Vega	Raymond Tusk	Stowell
2021
Al Aasy	Without A Fight	Outbox

2020-2011
2019
Marmelo	Aspetar	Laraaib
2018
Defoe	Danehill Kodiac	What About Carlo
2017
Muntahaa	Chemical Charge	Second Step
2016
Dartmouth	Sandro Botticelli	Restorer
2015
Arab Spring	Pether's Moon	Romsdal
2014
Cubanita	Noble Mission	Rawaki
2013
Universal	Quiz Mistress	Noble Mission
2012
Harris Tweed	Allied Powers	Bridge of Gold
2011
Indian Days	Bridge of Gold	Poet

2010-2001
2010
Harbinger	Manifest	Claremont
2009
Enroller	Centennial	Tastahil
2008
Royal And Regal	Zaham	Tempelstern
2007
Maraahel	Mighty	Munsef
2006
Mubtaker	Munsef	Maraahel
2005
Day Flight	Frank Sonata	Dubai Success
2004
Dubai Success	Gamut	Imperial Dancer
2003
Warrsan	Asian Heights	Compton Bolter
2002
Zindabad	St Expedit	Water Jump
2001
Lucido	Salford Express	Dalampour

2000-1991
2000
Yavana's Pace	Capri	Life Is Life
1999
Sadian	The Glow-Worm	Shaya
1998
Posidonas	Sacho	The Fly
1997
Whitewater Affair	Ela-Aristokrati	Kutta
1996
Spout	Wayne County	Moonax
1995
Strategic Choice	Broadway Flyer	Shambo
1994
Right Win	Persian Brave	Bobzao
1993
Linpac West	Spring	Always Friendly
1992
Saddlers' Hall	Shambo	Parting Moment
1991
Rock Hopper	Warm Feeling	Rudjig

1990-1981
1990
Brush Aside	Albadr	Charmer
1989
Unfuwain	Per Quod	Apache
1988
Alwasmi	Sir Harry Lewis	Lake Erie
1987
Rakaposhi King	Geordie's Delight	Gorgeous Strike
1986
Lemhill	Eagling	Gold And Ivory
1985
Jupiter Island	Ilium	Gay Lemur
1984
Gay Lemur	Dazari	Teenoso
1983
Diamond Shoal	Little Wolf	Amyndas
1982
Glint of Gold	Amyndas	Critique
1981
Pelerin	Cracaval	Shining Finish

1980-1970
1980
Niniski	Morse Code	Torus
1979
Icelandic	Olympios	Obraztsovy
1978
Orchestra	Welsh Dancer	Sporting Yankee
1977
Decent Fellow	Swell Fellow	Dutch Treat
1976
Quiet Fling	Rouge Sang	Libra's Rib
1975
Salado	Major Green	Court Dancer
1974
Freefoot	Peleid	Relay Race
1973
Rheingold	Knockroe	Coup de Feu
1972
Rock Roi	Selhurst	Example
1971
Meadowville	High Line	Rock Roi
1970
Torpid	Precipice Wood	Royal Rocket

The John Porter Stakes is a Group 3 flat horse race in Great Britain open to horses aged four years or older. It is run over a distance of 1 mile, 4 furlongs (2,414 metres) at Newbury in April.

== History ==
The event is named after John Porter (1838–1922), a successful horse trainer who co-founded Newbury Racecourse.

The race was established in 1928, and it was originally held in late September. It was initially restricted to three-year-olds and run over 1 mile and 5 furlongs. It was opened to four-year-olds in 1929, and cut to 1¼ miles in 1936.

The present version of the John Porter Stakes was introduced in 1949. From this point it was staged in April, and contested by older horses over 1½ miles.

The John Porter Stakes is currently sponsored by Dubai Duty Free. Its sponsored title promotes the company's Finest Surprise lottery.

== Records ==
Most successful horse:

- No horse has won this race more than once

Leading jockey (5 wins):

- Pat Eddery – Rock Hopper (1991), Saddlers' Hall (1992), Right Win (1994), Sadian (1999), Lucido (2001)

Leading trainer (7 wins):

- Sir Michael Stoute – Rock Hopper (1991), Saddlers' Hall (1992), Whitewater Affair (1997), Maraahel (2007), Harbinger (2010), Arab Spring (2015), Dartmouth (2016)

== Winners ==
Year	Winner	Age	Jockey	Trainer	Time
1928	Ox And Ass	3	Freddie Fox	Len Cundell	2:46.80
1929	Silver Hussar	4	Michael Beary	Richard Dawson	2:46.40
1930	Wedding Favour	3	Freddie Fox	Dawson Waugh	2:50.00
1931	Birthday Book	3	Bobby Dick	Joseph Lawson	2:47.40
1932	Corn Belt	4	Joe Childs	Cecil Boyd-Rochfort	2:47.00
1933	Sarum (Note: Firdaussi finished first, but was disqualified for crossing)	4	Bernard Carslake	Norman Scobie	2:52.00
1934	Felicitation	4	Gordon Richards	Frank Butters	2:42.60
1935	Night Owl	3	Clifford Richards	Cecil Boyd-Rochfort	2:55.40
1936	St Botolph	4	Gordon Richards	George Digby	2:10.40
1937	Haulfryn	4	Gordon Richards	Roger Metcalfe	2:03.20
1938	Fair Copy	4	Richard Perryman	Colledge Leader	2:13.40
	no race 1939–40
1941 (Note: Run as a handicap over 1 mile, 5 furlongs)	Ruscus	3	Harry Wragg	Ossie Bell	2:48.60
	no race 1942–48
1949	Solar Slipper	4	Eph Smith	Willie Stephenson	2:37.80
1950	Native Heath	5	Scobie Breasley	Victor Smyth	2:38.20
1951	Abandoned due to waterlogging
1952	Neron	4	Manny Mercer	Harry Wragg	2:39.60
1953	Wilwyn	5	Manny Mercer	George Colling	2:37.40
1954	Harwin	4	Harry Carr	Joe Dines	2:38.60
1955	Entente Cordiale	4	Doug Smith	George Colling	2:38.40
1956	Acropolis	4	Doug Smith	George Colling	2:46.00
1957	China Rock	4	Frankie Durr	Herbert Blagrave	2:37.60
1958	Doutelle	4	Harry Carr	Cecil Boyd-Rochfort	2:42.00
1959	Cutter	4	Jimmy Lindley	John Oxley	2:53.60
1960	Aggressor	5	Jimmy Lindley	Towser Gosden	2:41.80
1961	High Perch	5	Jimmy Lindley	Towser Gosden	2:48.60
1962	Hot Brandy	4	Duncan Keith	Walter Nightingall	2:45.00
1963	Peter Jones	4	Eph Smith	Arthur Budgett	2:55.40
1964	Royal Avenue	6	Lester Piggott	Noel Murless	2:42.00
1965	Soderini	4	Geoff Lewis	Staff Ingham	2:48.60
1966	Abandoned due to snow
1967	Charlottown	4	Jimmy Lindley	Gordon Smyth	2:33.00
1968	Fortissimo	4	Geoff Lewis	Brud Fetherstonhaugh	2:38.40
1969	Crozier	6	Duncan Keith	Peter Walwyn	2:30.40
1970	Torpid	5	Brian Taylor	John Oxley	2:54.90
1971	Meadowville	4	Frankie Durr	Michael Jarvis	2:35.70
1972	Rock Roi	5	Duncan Keith	Peter Walwyn	2:46.80
1973	Rheingold	4	Yves Saint-Martin	Barry Hills	2:35.82
1974	Freefoot	4	Lester Piggott	Harry Wragg	2:38.28
1975	Salado	4	Willie Carson	P Mitchell	2:58.07
1976	Quiet Fling	4	Lester Piggott	Jeremy Tree	2:29.84
1977	Decent Fellow	4	Lester Piggott	Toby Balding	2:35.50
1978	Orchestra	4	R Carroll	John Oxx sr.	2:47.15
1979	Icelandic	4	Christy Roche	Paddy Prendergast	2:39.85
1980	Niniski	4	Willie Carson	Dick Hern	2:31.07
1981	Pelerin	4	Brian Taylor	Harry Wragg	2:44.28
1982	Glint of Gold	4	John Matthias	Ian Balding	2:31.85
1983	Diamond Shoal	4	Steve Cauthen	Ian Balding	2:40.36
1984	Gay Lemur	4	Geoff Baxter	Bruce Hobbs	2:31.90
1985	Jupiter Island	6	Greville Starkey	Clive Brittain	2:41.79
1986	Lemhill	4	Ray Cochrane	Michael Blanshard	2:47.35
1987	Rakaposhi King	5	Steve Cauthen	Henry Cecil	2:54.62
1988	Alwasmi	4	Richard Hills	Harry Thomson Jones	2:37.39
1989	Unfuwain	4	Willie Carson	Dick Hern	2:40.85
1990	Brush Aside	4	Steve Cauthen	Henry Cecil	2:33.73
1991	Rock Hopper	4	Pat Eddery	Michael Stoute	2:32.90
1992	Saddlers' Hall	4	Pat Eddery	Michael Stoute	2:41.70
1993	Linpac West	7	Frankie Dettori	Bill Elsey	2:41.92
1994	Right Win	4	Pat Eddery	Richard Hannon Sr.	2:43.99
1995	Strategic Choice	4	Richard Quinn	Paul Cole	2:32.36
1996	Spout	4	Tim Sprake	Roger Charlton	2:38.80
1997	Whitewater Affair	4	Olivier Peslier	Michael Stoute	2:35.63
1998	Posidonas	6	Richard Quinn	Paul Cole	2:50.65
1999	Sadian	4	Pat Eddery	John Dunlop	2:31.21
2000 (Note: The 2000 edition was run at Haydock Park over 1 mile, 3 furlongs and 200 yards)	Yavana's Pace	8	Darryll Holland	Mark Johnston	2:45.86
2001	Lucido	5	Pat Eddery	John Dunlop	2:43.23
2002	Zindabad	6	Kevin Darley	Mark Johnston	2:30.64
2003	Warrsan	5	Philip Robinson	Clive Brittain	2:32.32
2004	Dubai Success	4	Michael Hills	Barry Hills	2:35.54
2005	Day Flight	4	Richard Hughes	John Gosden	2:40.22
2006	Mubtaker	9	Martin Dwyer	Marcus Tregoning	2:33.18
2007	Maraahel	6	Richard Hills	Sir Michael Stoute	2:36.83
2008	Royal and Regal	4	Neil Callan	Michael Jarvis	2:43.19
2009	Enroller	4	Martin Dwyer	Willie Muir	2:42.78
2010	Harbinger	4	Ryan Moore	Sir Michael Stoute	2:30.58
2011	Indian Days	6	Tom Queally	James Given	2:32.11
2012	Harris Tweed	5	Liam Jones	William Haggas	2:44.02
2013	Universal	4	Silvestre de Sousa	Mark Johnston	2:37.86
2014	Cubanita	5	Jim Crowley	Ralph Beckett	2:37.98
2015	Arab Spring	5	Ryan Moore	Sir Michael Stoute	2:32.35
2016 (Note: The 2016 running took place at Chelmsford City over 1 mile, 5 furlongs and 66 yards)	Dartmouth	4	Ryan Moore	Sir Michael Stoute	2:50.43
2017	Muntahaa	4	Jim Crowley	John Gosden	2:31.58
2018	Defoe	4	Andrea Atzeni	Roger Varian	2:40.21
2019	Marmelo	6	Gerald Mosse	Hughie Morrison	2:42.15
	no race 2020 (Note: The 2020 running was cancelled because of the COVID-19 pandemic in the United Kingdom)
2021	Al Aasy	4	Jim Crowley	William Haggas	2:31.92
2022	Max Vega	5	Rob Hornby	Ralph Beckett	2:36.31
2023	Grand Alliance	4	James Doyle	Charlie Fellowes	2:45.57
2024	Hamish	8	Tom Marquand	William Haggas	2:35.09
2025	Divina Grace	5	David Probert	Andrew Balding	2:33.64
2026	Convergent	4	Clifford Lee	Karl Burke	2:32.78

== See also ==
- Horse racing in Great Britain
- List of British flat horse races
