= Solario Stakes =

Flat horse race in Britain

- Class: Group 3
- Location: Sandown Park; Esher, England
- Inaugurated: 1947
- Race type: Flat / Thoroughbred
- Sponsor: BetMGM
- Website: Sandown Park

Race information
- Distance: 7f (1,408 metres)
- Surface: Turf
- Track: Right-handed
- Qualification: Two-year-olds
- Weight: 9 st 3 lb Allowances; 3 lb for fillies Penalties; 5 lb for G1 / G2 winners 3 lb for G3 winners
- Purse: £65,000 (2025); 1st: £36,862

Solario Stakes
2026
Alfred Wallace	Dover Street	Breacher

Previous years
2025
A Bit Of Spirit	Humidity	Oceans Four
2024
Field Of Gold	Matauri Bay	Royal Playwright
2023
Aablan	Inishfallen	Devil's Point
2022
Silver Knott	Wahaaj	Desert Hero
2021
Reach For The Moon	Great Max	Rerouting

2020-2011
2020
Etonian	King Vega	Apollo One
2019
Positive	Kameko	Al Suhail
2018
Too Darn Hot	Arthur Kitt	Confiding
2017
Masar	Romanised	Arbalet
2016
South Seas	Salouen	Eqtiraan
2015
First Selection	Manaafidh	Mr Wizard
2014
Aktabantay	Future Empire	Lexington Times
2013
Kingman	Emirates Flyer	Music Theory
2012
Fantastic Moon	Tha'ir	Master Of War
2011
Talwar	Silverheels	Eastern Sun

2010-2001
2010
Native Khan	Measuring Time	Surrey Star
2009
Shakespearean	Buzzword	Dubawi Phantom
2008
Sri Putra	The Cheka	Patrician's Glory
2007
Raven's Pass	City Leader	Gaspar Van Wittel
2006
Drumfire	Caldra	Danebury Hill
2005
Opera Cape	Yasoodd	Asset
2004
Windsor Knot	Embossed	Propinquity
2003
Barbajuan	Milk It Mick	Matloob
2002
Foss Way	Sweet Return	Dhabyan
2001
Redback	Tholjanah	Asheer

2000-1991
2000
King's Ironbridge	Storming Home	Barking Mad
1999
Best Of The Bests	Sarafan	Kingsclere
1998
Raise A Grand	Compton Admiral	Miss Universe
1997
Little Indian	Tracking	Haami
1996
Brave Act	Falkenham	Air Express
1995
Alhaarth	Staffin	Dismissed
1994
Lovely Millie	Sonic Boy	Fahal
1993
Island Magic	News And Echo	Governor George
1992
White Crown	King Paris	Fitzcarraldo
1991
Chicmond	Seattle Rhyme	Artic Tracker

1990-1988
1990
Radwell	Alnaab	Plan Of Action
1989
Be My Chief	Robellation	Balla Cove
1988
High Estate	Polar Run	Divine Guest

The Solario Stakes is a Group 3 flat horse race in Great Britain open to two-year-old horses. It is run at Sandown Park over a distance of 7 furlongs (1,408 metres), and it is scheduled to take place each year in late August or early September.

== History ==
The event is named after Solario, a successful racehorse in the 1920s and subsequently a leading sire. It was established in 1947, and the inaugural running was won by Panair.

For a period the Solario Stakes was classed at Listed level. It was promoted to Group 3 status in 1986.

The race was formerly held during Sandown Park's Variety Club Day, an annual fundraising event for the Variety Club. The 2011 running promoted the charity's Sunshine Coaches. In 2012 Variety Club day was moved to August and the race has since been sponsored by various companies and organisations.

== Records ==
Leading jockey (6 wins):

- Lester Piggott – March Past (1952), Pindari (1958), Speed of Sound (1966), Remand (1967), The Fort (1982), Oh So Sharp (1984)

Leading trainer (7 wins):

- John Gosden - Foss Way (2002), Windsor Knot (2004), Raven's Pass (2007), Kingman (2013), Too Darn Hot (2018), Reach For The Moon (2021), Field Of Gold (2024)

== Winners ==
Year	Winner	Jockey	Trainer	Time
1947	Panair	Bill Rickaby	Harry Wragg	1:30.60
1948	Suntime	Edgar Britt	Marcus Marsh	1:31.40
1949	Scratch II	Charlie Elliott	Charles Semblat	1:31.40
1950	Turco II	Harry Carr	Cecil Boyd-Rochfort	1:33.40
1951	Gay Time	Scobie Breasley	Noel Cannon	1:33.20
1952	March Past	Lester Piggott	Ken Cundell	1:33.60
1953	Barton Street	Joe Sime	Sam Hall	1:35.20
1954	North Cone	Eph Smith	Geoffrey Barling	1:35.40
1955	Castelmarino	Ken Gethin	Harold Wallington	1:35.60
1956	Nagaika	Scobie Breasley	William Smyth	1:33.20
1957	Aggressor	Jimmy Lindley	Towser Gosden	1:31.80
1958	Pindari	Lester Piggott	Noel Murless	1:33.40
1959	Intervener	Willie Snaith	Humphrey Cottrill	1:30.20
1960	Dual	Jimmy Lindley	Towser Gosden	1:31.80
1961	Hidden Meaning	Eph Smith	Harvey Leader	1:31.00
1962	Happy Omen	Harry Carr	Dick Hern	1:29.80
1963	Penny Stall	Duncan Keith	Walter Nightingall	1:32.80
1964	Rehearsed	Jimmy Lindley	Towser Gosden	1:30.60
1965	Charlottown	Jimmy Lindley	Towser Gosden	1:38.80
1966	Speed Of Sound	Lester Piggott	Noel Murless	1:32.20
1967	Remand	Lester Piggott	Dick Hern	1:31.60
1968	Murrayfield	Geoff Lewis	Ian Balding	1:33.60
1969	Miracle	Eddie Hide	Sir Gordon Richards	1:32.60
1970	Athens Wood	Greville Starkey	Harry Thomson Jones	1:33.00
1971	Meadow Mint	Willie Carson	Sam Armstrong	1:29.90
1972 (Note: The 1972 running took place at Kempton Park)	Duke Of Ragusa	John Gorton	Bruce Hobbs	1:27.52
	no race 1973
	no race 1974
1975	Over To You	Joe Mercer	Dick Hern	1:29.34
1976	Avgerinos	Pat Eddery	Peter Walwyn	1:31.43
1977	Bolak	Pat Eddery	Peter Walwyn	1:37.55
1978	Lyphard's Wish	Joe Mercer	Henry Cecil	1:28.67
1979	Rankin	Greville Starkey	Guy Harwood	1:29.58
1980	To-Agori-Mou	Greville Starkey	Guy Harwood	1:31.40
1981	Silver Hawk	Brian Taylor	Michael Albina	1:24.92
1982	The Fort	Lester Piggott	Henry Cecil	1:28.17
1983	Falstaff	Willie Carson	Dick Hern	1:29.11
1984	Oh So Sharp	Lester Piggott	Henry Cecil	1:29.31
1985	Bold Arrangement	Pat Eddery	Clive Brittain	1:29.39
1986	Shining Water	Steve Cauthen	Fulke Johnson Houghton	1:29.52
1987	Sanquirico	Steve Cauthen	Henry Cecil	1:29.28
1988	High Estate	Steve Cauthen	Henry Cecil	1:29.60
1989	Be My Chief	Steve Cauthen	Henry Cecil	1:29.38
1990	Radwell	George Duffield	James Fanshawe	1:30.34
1991	Chicmond	George Duffield	Sir Mark Prescott	1:29.90
1992	White Crown	Walter Swinburn	Ben Hanbury	1:31.53
1993	Island Magic	Kieren Fallon	Lynda Ramsden	1:31.08
1994	Lovely Millie	Frankie Dettori	Hilal Ibrahim	1:30.05
1995	Alhaarth	Willie Carson	Dick Hern	1:31.00
1996	Brave Act	George Duffield	Sir Mark Prescott	1:29.97
1997	Little Indian	John Reid	Sean Woods	1:31.45
1998	Raise a Grand	Gary Carter	Pip Payne	1:29.74
1999	Best of the Bests	Philip Robinson	Clive Brittain	1:29.06
2000	King's Ironbridge	Richard Hughes	Richard Hannon Sr.	1:31.45
2001	Redback	Jimmy Fortune	Richard Hannon Sr.	1:30.60
2002	Foss Way	Jimmy Fortune	John Gosden	1:29.50
2003	Barbajuan	Darryll Holland	Neville Callaghan	1:32.03
2004	Windsor Knot	Frankie Dettori	John Gosden	1:32.12
2005	Opera Cape	Steve Drowne	Sylvester Kirk	1:31.01
2006	Drumfire	Joe Fanning	Mark Johnston	1:29.18
2007	Raven's Pass	Jimmy Fortune	John Gosden	1:26.56
2008	Sri Putra	Philip Robinson	Michael Jarvis	1:29.13
2009	Shakespearean	Richard Hills	Mark Johnston	1:29.23
2010	Native Khan	Eddie Ahern	Ed Dunlop	1:29.19
2011	Talwar	Jimmy Fortune	Jeremy Noseda	1:33.27
2012	Fantastic Moon	William Buick	Jeremy Noseda	1:28.18
2013	Kingman	James Doyle	John Gosden	1:28.38
2014	Aktabantay	Ryan Moore	Hugo Palmer	1:29.84
2015	First Selection	George Baker	Simon Crisford	1:28.21
2016	South Seas	Oisin Murphy	Andrew Balding	1:30.81
2017	Masar	James Doyle	Charlie Appleby	1:27.89
2018	Too Darn Hot	Frankie Dettori	John Gosden	1:28.51
2019	Positive	Adam Kirby	Clive Cox	1:27.88
2020	Etonian	Pat Dobbs	Richard Hannon Jr.	1:28.44
2021	Reach For The Moon	Frankie Dettori	John & Thady Gosden	1:31.58
2022	Silver Knott	Pat Dobbs	Charlie Appleby	1:29.56
2023	Aablan	James Doyle	Charlie Appleby	1:32.50
2024	Field Of Gold	Kieran Shoemark	John & Thady Gosden	1:29.48
2025	A Bit Of Spirit	Rossa Ryan	Clive Cox	1:31.12
2026	Alfred Wallace	Kieran Shoemark	Ed Walker	1:32.35

== See also ==
- Horse racing in Great Britain
- List of British flat horse races
