= November Handicap =

Flat horse race in Britain

- Class: Handicap
- Location: Doncaster Racecourse; Doncaster, England
- Inaugurated: 1876
- Race type: Flat / Thoroughbred
- Sponsor: VirginBet
- Website: Doncaster

Race information
- Distance: 1m 3f 197y (2,393 metres)
- Surface: Turf
- Track: Left-handed
- Qualification: Three-years-old and up
- Weight: Handicap
- Purse: £70,000 (2025); 1st: £36,078

November Handicap
2026
| Alfred Wincham | Too Soon | Real Dream |

Previous years
2025
Castle Cove | Miss Dolly Rocker | Atherstone Warrior
2024
Lord Melbourne | Waxing Gibbous | Oneforthegutter
2023
Onesmoothoperator | Struth | Beraz
2022
Metier | Teed Up | Emiyn
2021
Farhan | Calling The Wind | Sam Cooke

2020-2011
2020
On To Victory | Rhythmic Intent | Nuits St Georges
2018
Royal Line | Not So Sleepy | Reshoun
2017
Saunter | Chelsea Lad | Eddystone Rock
2016
Prize Money | Erik The Red | Cape Cova
2015
Litigant | Buonarroti | Esteaming
2014
Open Eagle | Aramist | Dashing Star
2013
Conduct | Rio's Rosanna | Open Eagle
2012
Art Scholar | Communicator | Voodoo Prince
2011
Zuider Zee | Willing Foe | Merchant Of Dubai

2010-2001
2010
Times Up | The Betchworth Kid | Simenon
2009
Charm School | Hillview Boy | Ella
2008
Tropical Strait | The Betchworth Kid | Tastahil
2007
Malt Or Mash | Sanbuch | Night Crescendo
2006
Group Captain | Resonate | Book Of Music
2005
Come On Jonny | Akarem | Estepona
2004
Carte Diamond | Distant Prospect | Bendarshaan
2003
Turbo | Perfect Storm | Gold Ring
2002
Red Wine | Bollin Nellie | Greenfield
2001
Royal Cavalier | Mesmeric | Golden Wells

2000-1991
2000
Batswing | Carlys Quest | Seren Hill
1999
Flossy | Carlys Quest | Lord Lamb
1998
Yavana's Pace | Carlys Quest | Dato Star
1997
Sabadilla | Taunt | Shaft Of Light
1996
Clifton Fox | Kutta | Nabhaan
1995
Snow Princess | Dato Star | Secret Service
1994
Saxon Maid | Penny A Day | Proton
1993
Quick Ransom | Lookingforarainbow | Flight Lieutenant
1992
Turgenev | Daru | Castoret
1991
Hieroglyphic | Linpac West | Canny Chronicle

1990-1988
1990
Azzaam | Army Of Stars | Ivory Way
1989
Firelight Fiesta | Re-Release | My Chiara
1988
Young Benz | Aim To Please | Bush Hill

The November Handicap is a flat handicap horse race in Great Britain open to horses aged three years or older. It is run at Doncaster over a distance of 1 mile 3 furlongs and 197 yards (2,393 metres), and it is scheduled to take place each year in early November.

== History ==
The event was originally held at the New Barns, Manchester, where it was called the Manchester November Handicap. It was established in 1876, and was initially run over 1 mile and 4 furlongs before contested over 1 mile and 6 furlongs in 1880. It was cut to its present length in 1902 when the race was re-located to the Castle Irwell course.

The race was staged at Pontefract from 1942 to 1945. It returned to Manchester in 1946, and continued there until the venue closed in 1963.

The event was transferred to Doncaster in 1964, and from this point it was known as the Manchester Handicap. For a period it took place in October, on the same day as the Observer Gold Cup. It was rescheduled for November and given its current title in 1976. There was a race called the November Handicap run at Doncaster’s concluding Flat meeting of the season prior to 1976 but was over the St. Leger distance of 1m 6f 127 yds.

The November Handicap is now run on the last day of Britain's turf flat racing season.

== Records ==
Most successful horse:

- no horse has won this race more than once

Leading jockey (3 wins):

- Steve Donoghue – Ultimus (1911), Old Orkney (1927), Saracen (1928)
- Billy Nevett – Newton Ford (1936), Beinn Dearg (1940), Good Taste (1951)
- Joe Mercer – Paul Jones (1958), Misty Light (1971), Bold Rex (1985)
- Willie Carson – King Top (1972), Azzaam (1990), Hieroglyphic (1991)

Leading trainer (6 wins):

- John Gosden – Hieroglyphic (1991), Turgenev (1992), Sabadilla (1997), Charm School (2009), Zuider Zee (2011), Royal Line (2018)

== Winners since 1900 ==
- Weights given in stones and pounds.

| Year | Winner | Age | Weight | Jockey | Trainer | SP | Time |
|---|---|---|---|---|---|---|---|
| 1900 | Lexicon | 6 | 6-13 | Tristram Heppell | Joe Cannon | 40/1 | 3:14.40 |
| 1901 | Carabine | 3 | 6-09 | Archibald Adey | Hornsby | 14/1 |
| 1902 | St Maclou | 4 | 9-04 | Mornington Cannon | Charles Beatty | 9/1 | 2:40.20 |
| 1903 | Switch Cap | 3 |
| 1904 | Abandoned due to ? |
| 1905 | Ferment | 3 | 6-02 | Thomas Jennings | John Watson | 25/1 | 2:49.00 |
| 1906 | Spate | 3 | 7-05 | William Saxby | Robson | 100/7 | 2:42.60 |
| 1907 | Baltinglass | 3 | 7-11 | William Halsey | Peter Gilpin | 8/1 |
| 1908 | Old China | 4 | 7-11 | George McCall | James Fagan | 20/1 | 2:42.40 |
| 1909 | Admiral Togo III | 5 | 7-02 | Frank Wootton | Alec Taylor Jr. | 100/7 |
| 1910 | The Valet | 6 | 6-09 | Henri Jelliss | Joe Cannon | 9/1 |
| 1911 | Ultimus | 4 | 7-03 | Steve Donoghue | Fallon | 9/4 F | 2:35.80 |
| 1912 | Wagstaff | 3 | 8-01 | Charlie Foy | Willie Pratt | 8/1 | 2:40.60 |
| 1913 | Dalmatian | 6 | 7-08 | Charlie Foy | Joe Cannon | 10/1 | 2:42.80 |
| 1914 | Wardha | 3 | 6-05 | Peter Jones | Matthew Peacock | 9/1 |
| 1915-16 | no race |
| 1917 | Planet | 3 | 8-01 | Edward Lancaster | Joe Cannon | 4/1 F |
| 1918 | no race |
| 1919 | King John | 4 | 8-06 | Elijah Wheatley | Peter Gilpin | 13/2 | 2:40.00 |
| 1920 | Pomme-de-Terre | 4 | 9-04 | Tommy Robbins | George Dundas | 3/1 | 2:40.60 |
| 1921 | Blue Dun | 4 | 8-05 | Bernard Carslake | Percy Bewicke | 7/2 F |
| 1922 | Torelore | 5 | 9-00 | Bernard Carslake | Atty Persse | 6/1 | 2:36.00 |
| 1923 | Abandoned due to frost |
| 1924 | Cloudbank | 3 | 7-10 | Michael Beary | Laing Ward | 100/9 | 2:41.40 |
| 1925 | Abandoned due to frost |
| 1926 | Abandoned due to fog |
| 1927 | Old Orkney | 3 | 7-07 | Steve Donoghue | Macaulay | 8/1 | 2:44.80 |
| 1928 | Saracen | 3 | 7-08 | Steve Donoghue | Basil Jarvis | 6/1 | 2:48.40 |
| 1929 | Promptitude | 5 | 6-13 | Willie Stephrnson | Tom Rimell | 33/1 | 2:47.20 |
| 1930 | Glorious Devon | 3 | 7-05 | Gordon Richards | Tommy Hogg | 25/1 | 2:57.60 |
| 1931 | North Drift | 4 | 7-06 | Charlie Dowdall | Peter Vasey | 8/1 F | 2:52.80 |
| 1932 | Hypostyle | 3 | 7-05 | Albert Richardson | H Ferguson | 20/1 |
| 1933 | Jean's Dream | 3 | 7-05 | Johnny Dines | Matthew Peacock | 20/1 | 2:38.00 |
| 1934 | Pip Emma | 3 | 7-09 | Eph Smith | Jack Jarvis | 100/7 | 2:40.00 |
| 1935 | Free Fare | 7 | 8-04 | Sam Wragg | Ted Gwilt | 22/1 | 2:43.20 |
| 1936 | Newtown Ford | 4 | 8-04 | Billy Nevett | Matthew Peacock | 100/8 | 2:44.60 |
| 1937 | Solitaire | 6 | 8-01 | Joseph Taylor | Harry Peacock | 25/1 | 2:42.20 |
| 1938 | Pappageno II | 3 | 8-06 | Gordon Richards | Martin Hartigan | 100/7 | 2:52.80 |
| 1939 | Tutor | 3 | 8-03 | Eph Smith | Jack Jarvis | 9/2 F | 2:38.40 |
| 1940 | Beinn Dearg | 5 | 8-02 | Billy Nevett | Harry Peacock | 9/1 | 2:42.60 |
| 1941 | Crown Colony | 5 | 7-09 | Cliff Richards | Joseph Lawson | 100/6 | 2:35.40 |
| 1942 (Note: The 1942 running took place at Pontefract) | Golden Boy | 4 | 8-11 | Doug Smith | Billy Carr | 10/1 | 2:41.00 |
| 1943 (Note: The 1943 running took place at Pontefract) | Mad Carew | 4 | 7-06 | Joe Sime | Peter Vasey | 33/1 | 2:40.00 |
| 1944 (Note: The 1944 running took place at Pontefract) | Kerry Piper | 3 | 8-00 | Chuck Spares | Sam Armstrong | 25/1 |
| 1945 (Note: The 1945 running took place at Pontefract) | Oatflake | 3 | 7-13 | Edgar Britt | Sam Armstrong | 100/8 | 2:44.00 |
| 1946 | Las Vegas | 4 | 8-08 | Harry Wragg | George Boyd | 20/1 | 2:48.00 |
| 1947 | Regret | 4 | 6-03 | Jimmy Walker | Percy Vasey | 66/1 | 2:39.60 |
| 1948 | Sports Master | 3 | 6-13 | Derrick Greening | John Beary | 20/1 | 2:44.20 |
| 1949 | Fidonia | 5 | 9-02 | Harry Carr | Evan Parker | 40/1 | 2:35.60 |
| 1950 | Coltbridge | 4 | 7-06 | Joe Sime | Sam Hall | 100/6 | 2:48.80 |
| 1951 | Good Taste | 7 | 7-13 | Billy Nevett | Sam Hall | 28/1 | 2:41.80 |
| 1952 | Summer Rain | 3 | 7-13 | Percy Evans | Jack Jarvis | 100/6 | 2:43.20 |
| 1953 | Torch Singer | 4 | 6-05 | Denis Ward | Norman Scobie | 40/1 | 2:53.60 |
| 1954 | Abandoned due to waterlogging |
| 1955 | Tearaway | 5 | 6-11 | Walter Bentley | Sam Hall | 40/1 | 2:41.00 |
| 1956 | Trentham Boy | 5 | 7-06 | Josh Gifford | Towser Gosden | 100/6 | 2:50.87 |
| 1957 | Chief Barker | 4 | 6-05 | Dennis Walker | Ryan Price | 33/1 | 2:41.06 |
| 1958 | Paul Jones | 3 | 8-02 | Joe Mercer | Arthur Budgett | 100/7 | 2:51.37 |
| 1959 | Operatic Society | 3 | 8-09 | Ken Gethin | John Benstead | 18/1 | 2:34.10 |
| 1960 | Dalnamein | 5 | 7-10 | Johnny Greenaway | Sam Hall | 28/1 | 2:39.14 |
| 1961 | Henry's Choice | 4 | 8-02 | Eddie Hide | Rufus Beasley | 100/8 | 2:45.34 |
| 1962 | Damredub | 5 | 8-01 | Michael Germon | Towser Gosden | 20/1 | 2:41.02 |
| 1963 | Best Song | 4 | 9-06 | Jimmy Lindley | Towser Gosden | 100/7 | 2:45.68 |
| 1964 | Osier | 4 | 7-10 | Doug Smith | Bernard van Cutsem | 20/1 | 2:33.60 |
| 1965 | Concealdem | 6 | 8-10 | Ron Hutchinson | Towser Gosden | 100/8 | 2:36.80 |
| 1966 | Polish Warrior | 3 | 7-03 | Sandy Barclay | Arthur Budgett | 100/6 | 2:41.80 |
| 1967 | Bugle Boy | 4 | 7-08 | Sandy Barclay | Arthur Budgett | 22/1 | 2:41.80 |
| 1968 | Zardia | 4 | 7-08 | Ray Still | Avril Vasey | 25/1 | 2:40.00 |
| 1969 | Tintagel II | 4 | 9-00 | Lester Piggott | Richmond Sturdy | 15/2 | 2:41.40 |
| 1970 | Saraceno | 5 | 9-02 | Graham Sexton | Harry Wragg | 15/2 | 2:30.20 |
| 1971 | Misty Light | 3 | 8-05 | Joe Mercer | Frank Armstrong | 25/1 | 2:35.50 |
| 1972 | King Top | 3 | 7-11 | Willie Carson | John Oxley | 6/1 | 2:37.57 |
| 1973 | Only For Joe | 3 | 7-04 | Ian Jenkinson | Ron Smyth | 13/1 | 2:40.99 |
| 1974 | Gritti Palace | 5 | 7-00 | Richard Fox | Peter Robinson | 7/2 F | 2:37.39 |
| 1975 | Mr Bigmore | 3 | 9-01 | Greville Starkey | Peter Robinson | 100/30 | 2:34.03 |
| 1976 | Gale Bridge | 3 | 8-12 | Brian Taylor | Ryan Price | 10/1 | 2:50.08 |
| 1977 | Sailcloth | 3 | 7-07 | Taffy Thomas | William Hastings-Bass | 13/2 | 2:38.49 |
| 1978 | Eastern Spring | 4 | 7-10 | Michael Wigham | Luca Cumani | 17/2 | 2:35.33 |
| 1979 | Morse Code | 4 | 8-03 | Paul Cook | John Dunlop | 11/2 F | 2:41.18 |
| 1980 | Path of Peace | 4 | 8-05 | Jimmy Bleasdale | Chris Thornton | 14/1 | 2:49.82 |
| 1981 | Lafontaine | 4 | 8-07 | George Duffield | Clive Brittain | 16/1 | 2:35.67 |
| 1982 (dh) | Double Shuffle; Turkoman | 3; 3 | 9-00; 8-07 | George Duffield; Dennis McKay | Gavin Pritchard-Gordon; Duncan Sasse | 12/1; 20/1 | 2:43.62 |
| 1983 | Asir | 3 | 8-07 | Greville Starkey | Guy Harwood | 10/1 | 2:36.81 |
| 1984 | Abu Kadra | 3 | 8-12 | Walter Swinburn | Michael Stoute | 25/1 | 2:47.09 |
| 1985 | Bold Rex | 3 | 8-07 | Joe Mercer | John Dunlop | 20/1 | 2:42.86 |
| 1986 | Beijing | 3 | 8-04 | Richard Quinn | Paul Cole | 16/1 | 2:38.48 |
| 1987 | Swingit Gunner | 6 | 8-11 | Mark Birch | Colin Tinkler | 9/1 | 2:40.50 |
| 1988 | Young Benz | 4 | 8-04 | Mark Birch | Peter Easterby | 12/1 | 2:35.30 |
| 1989 (Note: The 1989 running took place at Thirsk) | Firelight Fiesta | 4 | 9-08 | Bruce Raymond | Ben Hanbury | 9/2 F | 2:37.50 |
| 1990 | Azzaam | 3 | 9-08 | Willie Carson | John Dunlop | 7/1 | 2:38.07 |
| 1991 | Hieroglyphic | 3 | 8-13 | Willie Carson | John Gosden | 11/4 F | 2:37.76 |
| 1992 | Turgenev | 3 | 9-00 | Darryll Holland | John Gosden | 10/1 | 2:35.99 |
| 1993 | Quick Ransom | 5 | 8-10 | Jason Weaver | Mark Johnston | 6/1 F | 2:34.53 |
| 1994 | Saxon Maid | 3 | 8-09 | Jason Weaver | Luca Cumani | 16/1 | 2:43.82 |
| 1995 | Snow Princess | 3 | 8-02 | Richard Hills | Lord Huntingdon | 5/1 F | 2:31.90 |
| 1996 | Clifton Fox | 4 | 8-10 | Nigel Day | Jeremy Glover | 9/1 | 2:40.19 |
| 1997 | Sabadilla | 3 | 7-08 | Royston Ffrench | John Gosden | 10/1 | 2:41.68 |
| 1998 | Yavana's Pace | 6 | 9-10 | Darryll Holland | Mark Johnston | 8/1 | 2:36.73 |
| 1999 | Flossy | 3 | 7-07 | Tony Beech | Chris Thornton | 5/1 | 2:44.65 |
| 2000 | Batswing | 5 | 8-08 | Robert Winston | Brian Ellison | 14/1 | 2:44.24 |
| 2001 | Royal Cavalier | 4 | 7-10 | Paul Quinn | Reg Hollinshead | 50/1 | 2:41.26 |
| 2002 | Red Wine | 3 | 8-01 | Martin Dwyer | Jamie Osborne | 16/1 | 2:46.59 |
| 2003 | Turbo | 4 | 9-02 | Tony Clark | Toby Balding | 25/1 | 2:35.72 |
| 2004 | Carte Diamond | 3 | 9-06 | Kieren Fallon | Brian Ellison | 12/1 | 2:43.16 |
| 2005 | Come On Jonny | 3 | 8-00 | Nelson de Souza | Ralph Beckett | 14/1 | 2:43.65 |
| 2006 (Note: The 2006 edition was run at Windsor over 1 mile, 3 furlongs and 135 yards) | Group Captain | 4 | 9-05 | Richard Hughes | Roger Charlton | 10/1 | 2:29.16 |
| 2007 | Malt or Mash | 3 | 8-10 | Ryan Moore | Richard Hannon Sr. | 5/1 | 2:29.23 |
| 2008 | Tropical Strait | 5 | 8-13 | Martin Dwyer | David Arbuthnot | 20/1 | 2:42.19 |
| 2009 | Charm School | 4 | 8-12 | Jimmy Fortune | John Gosden | 17/2 | 2:35.96 |
| 2010 | Times Up | 4 | 8-13 | Dane O'Neill | John Dunlop | 14/1 | 2:32.62 |
| 2011 | Zuider Zee | 4 | 8-13 | Robert Havlin | John Gosden | 8/1 | 2:36.49 |
| 2012 | Art Scholar | 5 | 8-07 | Franny Norton | Michael Appleby | 20/1 | 2:35.04 |
| 2013 | Conduct | 6 | 9-02 | Seb Sanders | William Haggas | 8/1 | 2:44.95 |
| 2014 | Open Eagle | 5 | 8-12 | Daniel Tudhope | David O'Meara | 15/2 F | 2:48.22 |
| 2015 | Litigant | 7 | 9-10 | George Baker | Joseph Tuite | 10/1 | 2:45.07 |
| 2016 | Prize Money | 3 | 8-10 | George Wood | Saeed bin Suroor | 4/1 | 2:31.42 |
| 2017 | Saunter | 4 | 8-13 | Jim Crowley | Ian Williams | 6/1 | 2:39.54 |
| 2018 | Royal Line | 4 | 9-08 | Robert Havlin | John Gosden | 9/1 | 2:40.26 |
| 2019 | Abandoned due to waterlogging |
| 2020 | On To Victory | 6 | 9-00 | James Doyle | Alan King | 10/1 | 2:36.52 |
| 2021 | Farhan | 3 | 8-03 | Hollie Doyle | John Bulter | 9/2 F | 2:39.67 |
| 2022 | Metier | 6 | 8-10 | Saffie Osborne | Harry Fry | 13/2 | 2:42.20 |
| 2023 (Note: The 2023 running was run at Newcastle on an all-weather surface over 1 mile, 4 furlongs and 98 yards) | Onesmoothoperator | 5 | 9–00 | Ben Robinson | Brian Ellison | 15/2 | 2:47.56 |
| 2024 | Lord Melbourne | 4 | 8-13 | Jack Doughty | Ralph Beckett | 14/1 | 2:39.84 |
| 2025 | Castle Cove | 4 | 8-11 | Jason Hart | William Haggas | 4/1 JF | 2:42.33 |
| 2026 | Alfred Wincham | 4 | 9-02 | Oisin Orr | Patrick Neville | 3/1 JF | 2:37.42 |

== Earlier winners ==
- 1876: Polonaise
- 1877: Hopbloom
- 1878: Belphoebe
- 1879: Mars
- 1880: Madame du Barry
- 1881: Gladstone
- 1882: Boswell
- 1883: Corrie Roy
- 1884: Keir
- 1885: Raffaello
- 1886: Stourhead
- 1887: Carlton
- 1888: Claymore
- 1889: Fallow Chat
- 1890: Parlington
- 1891: Lily of Lumley
- 1892: Paddy
- 1893: Golden Drop
- 1894: Ravensbury
- 1895: Ivor
- 1896: Telescope
- 1897: Asterie
- 1898: Chaleureux
- 1899: Proclamation

== See also ==
- Horse racing in Great Britain
- List of British flat horse races
- Recurring sporting events established in 1876 – this race is included under its original title, Manchester November Handicap.
