= Doonside Cup =

Flat horse race in Britain

- Class: Listed
- Location: Ayr Racecourse; Ayr, Scotland
- Race type: Flat / Thoroughbred
- Sponsor: Ladbrokes
- Website: Ayr

Race information
- Distance: 1m 2f (2,012 metres)
- Surface: Turf
- Track: Left-handed
- Qualification: Three-years-old and up
- Weight: 9 st 0 lb (3yo); 9 st 5 lb (4yo+); Allowances; 5 lb for fillies Penalties; 7 lb for G1 / G2 winners* 5 lb for G3 winners* 3 lb for Listed winners* * after 31 March
- Purse: £60,000 (2025); 1st: £34,026

Doonside Cup
2026
Fast Tracker	Ice Max	Grey Cuban

Previous years
2025
Almeric	King's Gambit	Liberty Lane
2024
Persica	Enfjaar	Eydon
2023
Royal Rhyme	Pride Of America	Helvic Dream
2022
Royal Champion	Euchen Glen	Stormy Antarctic
2021
Maydanny	Euchen Glen	Juan Elcano

2020-2011
2020
Addeybb	Lord Glitters	San Donato
2019
Encapsulation	What's The Story	Big Country
2018
Dolphin Vista	Morando	Aspetar
2016
Secret Number	Motdaw	Abdon
2015
Scottish	Mutakayyef	Exosphere
2014
Sky Hunter	Sennockian Star	Mutatis Mutandis
2013
Sharestan	Willie The Whipper	Clon Brulee
2012
Opera Gal	Circumvent	St Moritz
2011
Poet	Vesuve	Hot Prospect

2010-2001
2010
Vesuve	Kings Gambit	Circumvent
2009
Prince Siegfried	Baila Me	Arch Rebel
2008
Lady Deauville	Mutajarred	Perks
2007
Anna Pavlova	Dunaskin	Ivy Creek
2006
Mashaahed	Ouninpohja	Profit's Reality
2005
Fruhlingssturm	Real Quality	Windsor Knot
2004
Into The Dark	Percussionist	Bonecrusher
2003
Imperial Dancer	Island House	Scott's View
2002
Island House	Vintage Premium	Torcello
2001
Albarahin	Esyoueffcee	Delius

2000-1991
2000
Island House	Forbearing	Vintage Premium
1999
Leggera	Carry The Flag	Achilles
1998
Largesse	Salmon Ladder	Redbridge
1997
Ghataas	Sandmoor Chambray	Winter Romance
1996
Key To My Heart	Desert Shot	Behaviour
1995
Annus Mirabilis	Captain Horatius	Salt Lake
1994
Dancing Bloom	Key To My Heart	Pearl Kite
1993
John Balliol	Mack The Knife	Key To My Heart
1992
Linpac West	Percy's Girl	Guilty Secret
1991
Azzaam	Spinning	Swift Sword

1990-1988
1990
Pirate Army	Berry's Dream	Spritsail
1989
Shellac	Sudden Victory	Operation Wolf
1988
Per Quod	Apache	Lazaz

The Doonside Cup is a Listed flat horse race in Great Britain open to horses aged three years or older. It is run at Ayr over a distance of 1 mile and 2 furlongs (2,012 metres), and it is scheduled to take place each year in September. It is currently held on the final day of Ayr's three-day Ayr Gold Cup Festival (previously the Western Meeting).

== Winners ==
Year	Winner	Age	Jockey	Trainer	Time
1946	Auralia	3	Doug Smith	Reg Day	2:25.20
1947	Mighty Maharatta	3	Edgar Britt	Frank Armstrong	Not taken
1948	Spahee	3	Doug Smith	Harry Peacock	2:13.40
1949	Donate	3	Billy Nevett	Matthew Peacock	2:23.80
1950	Saved	3	Joe Sime	Sam Hall
1951	Anamnestes	3	Edgar Britt	Charles Elsey	2:20.40
1952	Bondage	3	Geoff Littlewood	Harry Peacock	2:22.00
1953	Stormy Hour	3	Bill Rickaby	Jack Jarvis	2:21.80
1954	Tale Of Two Cities	3	Billy Nevett	H M Hartigan	2:39.20
1955	Alessi	3	Edgar Britt	Charles Elsey	2:37.80
1956	Money To Burn	3	Joe Sime	Rufus Beasley	2:21.00
1957	Tattinger	3	Edgar Britt	Charles Elsey	2:43.22
1958	Aggressor	3	Jimmy Lindley	Towser Gosden	2:24.06
1959	Connaissance	3	Bill Rickaby	Reg Day	2:16.80
1960	Caistor Top	3	Joe Sime	Sam Hall	2:34.06
1961	Dual	3	Eddie Hide	Towser Gosden	2:31.61
1962	River Whistle	3	Jimmy Lindley	Bill Elsey	2:30.21
1963	Thik Hai	3	Brian Connorton	Snowy Gray	2:22.39
1964	Devastation	3	Joe Sime	Sam Hall	2:39.39
1965	Rehearsed	3	Bobby Elliott	Towser Gosden	2:41.04
1966	Reubens	3	Joe Sime	Herbert Murless	2:36.86
1967	Ludham	3	Denis Letherby	Eric Cousins	2:22.68
1968	Attalus	3	Sandy Barclay	Noel Murless	2:21.04
1969	Nedda	3	Ernie Johnson	Bruce Hobbs	2:17.82
1970	Pembroke Castle	3	Sandy Barclay	Noel Murless	Not taken
1971	Primerello	3	Eddie Hide	Henry Cecil	2:23.91
1972	Paper Cap	3	Brian Jago	Bruce Hobbs	2:19.44
1973	Warpath	4	Eddie Hide	Sam Hall	2:26.66
1974	Candlestand	3	Willie Carson	Vincent O'Brien	2:25.81
1975	Mil's Bomb	4	Geoff Lewis	Noel Murless	2:23.24
1976	Gunner B	3	Joe Mercer	G Toft	2:21.66
1977	Norfolk Air	4	Ron Hutchinson	John Dunlop	2:19.72
1978	Jellaby	5	Brian Taylor	Ryan Price	2:22.96
1979	Town And Country	5	Willie Carson	Dick Hern	2:35.05
1980	Sea Pigeon	10	Jonjo O'Neill	Peter Easterby	2:26.52
1981	Castle Keep	4	Pat Eddery	John Dunlop	2:19.04
1982	Fine Sun	5	Pat Eddery	Mick Lambert	2:22.34
1983	Balladier	3	Billy Newnes	Henry Candy	2:21.51
1984	Hatim	3	Pat Eddery	Jeremy Tree	2:27.23
1985	Abandoned due to waterlogging
1986	Santiki	3	Tony Kimberley	Sir Michael Stoute	2:14.51
1987	Lake Erie	4	Walter Swinburn	Sir Michael Stoute	2:26.90
1988	Per Quod	3	Bruce Raymond	Ben Hanbury	2:26.17
1989	Shellac	3	Frankie Dettori	Luca Cumani	2:26.08
1990	Pirate Army	4	Frankie Dettori	Luca Cumani	2:23.07
1991	Azzaam	4	Willie Carson	John Dunlop	2:13.31
1992	Linpac West	6	John Carroll	John Spearing	2:25.85
1993	John Balliol	5	Kevin Darley	David Loder	2:17.29
1994	Dancing Bloom	4	Willie Carson	Sir Michael Stoute	2:22.31
1995	Annus Mirabilis	3	Darryll Holland	Sir Michael Stoute	2:17.04
1996	Key To My Heart	6	Jason Weaver	Sally Hall	2:15.43
1997	Ghataas	3	Richard Hills	John Dunlop	2:19.00
1998	Largesse	4	John Egan	John Berry	2:28.83
1999	Leggera	4	Richard Quinn	John Dunlop	2:22.95
2000	Island House	4	Michael Roberts	Geoff Wragg	2:23.08
2001	Albarahin	6	Richard Hills	Marcus Tregoning	2:17.80
2002	Island House	6	Darryll Holland	Geoff Wragg	2:17.81
2003	Imperial Dancer	5	Ted Durcan	Mick Channon	2:15.56
2004	Into The Dark	3	Kerrin McEvoy	Saeed bin Suroor	2:27.85
2005	Fruhlingssturm	5	Neil Callan	Michael Jarvis	2:10.77
2006	Mashaahed	3	Ryan Moore	Barry Hills	2:11.08
2007	Anna Pavlova	4	Paul Hanagan	Richard Fahey	2:13.56
2008	Lady Deauville	3	Franny Norton	Paul Blockley	2:20.34
2009	Prince Siegfried	3	Frankie Dettori	Saeed bin Suroor	2:06.00
2010	Vesuve	4	Frankie Dettori	Saeed bin Suroor	2:06.20
2011	Poet	6	Adam Kirby	Clive Cox	2:15.63
2012	Opera Gal	5	Jim Crowley	Andrew Balding	2:13.94
2013	Sharestan	5	Kieren Fallon	Saeed bin Suroor	2:14.31
2014	Sennockian Star (Note: Sky Hunter finished first in 2014, but was disqualified after testing positive for a prohibited substance)	4	Franny Norton	Mark Johnston	2:06.31
2015	Scottish	3	David Probert	Andrew Balding	2:05.67
2016	Secret Number	6	Danny Tudhope	Saeed bin Suroor	2:09.39
2017	Abandoned due to waterlogging
2018	Dolphin Vista	5	Danny Tudhope	Ralph Beckett	2:13.95
2019	Encapsulation	3	Ben Curtis	Andrew Balding	2:11.99
2020	Addeybb	6	Tom Marquand	William Haggas	2:11.48
2021	Maydanny	5	Joe Fanning	Mark Johnston	2:06.93
2022	Royal Champion	4	Jack Mitchell	Roger Varian	2:06.20
2023	Royal Rhyme	3	Clifford Lee	Karl Burke	2:06.26
2024	Persica	3	Sean Levey	Richard Hannon Jr.	2:05.99
2025	Almeric	3	Oisin Murphy	Andrew Balding	2:13.59
2026	Fast Tracker	5	James Doyle	Ed Walker	2:17.59

== See also ==
- Horse racing in Great Britain
- List of British flat horse races
