= Brigadier Gerard Stakes =

Flat horse race in Britain

- Class: Group 3
- Location: Sandown Park; Esher, Surrey, England
- Inaugurated: 1953
- Race type: Flat / Thoroughbred
- Sponsor: Chasemore Farm
- Website: Sandown Park

Race information
- Distance: 1m 1f 209y (2,002m)
- Surface: Turf
- Track: Right-handed
- Qualification: Four-years-old and up
- Weight: 9 st 2 lb Allowances; 3 lb for fillies and mares Penalties; 7 lb for Group 1 winners * 5 lb for Group 2 winners * 3 lb for Group 3 winners * * since 31 August last year
- Purse: £80,000 (2024); 1st: £45,368

Brigadier Gerard Stakes
2026
Ombudsman	Gethin	Almeric

Previous years
2025
Almaqam	Ombudsman	Phantom Flight
2024
Royal Rhyme	Certain Lad	Miss Cantik
2023
Hukum	Desert Crown	Solid Stone
2022
Bay Bridge	Mostahdaf	Addeybb
2021
Euchen Glen	Sangarius	Fox Tal

2020-2011
2020
Lord North	Elarqam	Telecaster
2018
Poet's Word	Laraaib	Desert Encounter
2017
Autocratic	Algometer	Steel of Madrid
2016
Time Test	Western Hymn	Scottish
2015
Western Hymn	Arab Spring	Niceofyoutotellme
2014
Sharestan	Sheikhzayedroad	Top Notch Tonto
2013
Mukhadram	Main Sequence	Miblish
2012
Carlton House	Sagramor	Hunter's Light
2011
Workforce	Poet	Jan Vermeer

2010-2001
2010
Stotsfold	Tazeez	Glass Harmonium
2009
Cima De Triomphe	Conduit	Stotsfold
2008
Smokey Oakey	Maraahel	Pipedreamer
2006
Notnowcato	Boule d'Or	Hattan
2005
New Morning	North Light	Mubtaker
2004
Bandari	Ikhtyar	Sunstrach
2003
Sights On Gold	Parasol	Indian Creek
2002
Potemkin	The Mask	Imperial Dancer
2001
Border Arrow	Compton Bolter	Adilabad

2000-1991
2000
Shiva	Border Arrow	Sossus Vlei
1999
Chester House	Generous Rosi	Diamond White
1998
Insatiable	Garuda	Germano
1997
Bosra Sham	Predappio	Centre Stalls
1996
Pilsudski	Lucky Di	Song Of Tara
1995
Alriffa	Just Happy	Nicolotte
1994
Chatoyant	Maroof	Garden Of Heaven
1993
Red Bishop	Highland Dress	Half A Tick
1992
Opera House	Wiorno	Young Buster
1991
Stagecraft	Bold Russian	Croupier

1990-1988
1990
Husyan	Scenic	Alcando
1989
Hibernian Gold	Highland Chieftain	Reprimand
1988
Highland Chieftain	Media Starguest	Indian Skimmer

The Brigadier Gerard Stakes is a Group 3 flat horse race in Great Britain open to horses aged four years or older. It is run at Sandown Park over a distance of 1 mile 1 furlong and 209 yards (2,002 metres), and it is scheduled to take place each year in late May or early June.

The event was established in 1953, and it was originally called the Coronation Stakes. Its title commemorated the coronation of Queen Elizabeth II.

The race was renamed the Brigadier Gerard Stakes in 1973. This was in honour of Brigadier Gerard, a recently retired champion racehorse whose victories included the Westbury Stakes (later re-named the Gordon Richards Stakes) and the Eclipse Stakes at Sandown Park. The 2021 race was run in memory of Joe Mercer, who died the week before the race and who rode Brigadier Gerard in all his races.

== Records ==
Most successful horse (2 wins):

- Chamier – 1954, 1955
- Tacitus – 1963, 1964
- Jellaby – 1977, 1979

Leading jockey (7 wins):

- Ryan Moore - Workforce (2011), Carlton House (2012), Time Test (2016), Autocratic (2017), Poet's Word (2018), Regal Reality (2019), Bay Bridge (2022)

Leading trainer (12 wins):

- Sir Michael Stoute – Stagecraft (1991), Opera House (1992), Pilsudski (1996), Insatiable (1998), Notnowcato (2006), Workforce (2011), Carlton House (2012), Autocratic (2017), Poet's Word (2018), Regal Reality (2019), Bay Bridge (2022)

== Winners ==
Year	Winner	Age	Jockey	Trainer	Time
1953	Guersant	4	Paul Blanc	Geoffrey Watson	2:07.40
1954	Chamier	4	Scobie Breasley	Noel Cannon	2:11.80
1955	Chamier	5	Scobie Breasley	Noel Cannon	2:12.60
1956	Tribord	5	Jean Massard	Serge Boullenger	2:24.60
1957	Gilles de Retz	4	Frank Barlow	Peter Walwyn	2:07.20
1958	Arctic Explorer	4	Lester Piggott	Noel Murless	2:14.20
1959	Aggressor	4	Jimmy Lindley	Towser Gosden	2:21.20
1960	Lucky Guy	4	Bill Williamson	Seamus McGrath	2:15.00
1961	Petite Etoile	5	Lester Piggott	Noel Murless	2:18.80
1962	Cipriani	4	Garnie Bougoure	Paddy Prendergast	2:12.80
1963	Tacitus	4	Geoff Lewis	Walter Nightingall	2:16.20
1964	Tacitus	5	Duncan Keith	Walter Nightingall	2:26.80
1965	Philanderer	4	Joe Mercer	Walter Wharton	2:14.00
1966	Super Sam	4	Jimmy Lindley	Jack Watts	2:24.20
1967	Busted	4	George Moore	Noel Murless	2:18.60
1968	Royal Palace	4	Sandy Barclay	Noel Murless	2:09.80
1969	Connaught	4	Sandy Barclay	Noel Murless	2:10.80
1970	Hotfoot	4	John Gorton	Bruce Hobbs	2:17.90
1971	Pembroke Castle	4	Geoff Lewis	Noel Murless	2:16.50
1972	Stubb's Gazette	4	Eric Eldin	Doug Smith	2:10.20
1973 (Note: The 1973 running took place at Kempton Park)	Scottish Rifle	4	Ron Hutchinson	John Dunlop	2:04.50
1974	Ksar	4	Willie Carson	Bernard van Cutsem	2:08.59
1975	Rymer	4	Brian Taylor	Herbert Blagrave	2:13.80
1976	Anne's Pretender	4	Lester Piggott	Ryan Price	2:06.06
1977	Jellaby	4	Brian Taylor	Ryan Price	2:10.14
1978	Gunner B	5	Joe Mercer	Henry Cecil	2:04.19
1979	Jellaby	6	Pat Eddery	Peter Walwyn	2:13.27
1980	Gregorian	4	Lester Piggott	Vincent O'Brien	2:09.90
1981	Abandoned due to waterlogging
1982	Kalaglow	4	Greville Starkey	Guy Harwood	2:02.14
1983	Stanerra	5	Brian Rouse	Frank Dunne	2:12.63
1984	Adonijah	4	Lester Piggott	Henry Cecil	2:11.26
1985	Commanche Run	4	Lester Piggott	Luca Cumani	2:12.66
1986	Bedtime	6	Willie Carson	Dick Hern	2:09.43
1987	Mtoto	4	Michael Roberts	Alec Stewart	2:06.55
1988	Highland Chieftain	5	Willie Carson	John Dunlop	2:10.01
1989	Hibernian Gold	4	Greville Starkey	Guy Harwood	2:08.66
1990	Husyan	4	Willie Carson	Peter Walwyn	2:09.26
1991	Stagecraft	4	Steve Cauthen	Michael Stoute	2:07.75
1992	Opera House	4	Steve Cauthen	Michael Stoute	2:08.68
1993	Red Bishop	5	Michael Roberts	John Gosden	2:08.83
1994	Chatoyant	4	Michael Kinane	Bill Watts	2:07.52
1995	Alriffa	4	Pat Eddery	Richard Hannon Sr.	2:12.15
1996	Pilsudski	4	Pat Eddery	Michael Stoute	2:06.76
1997	Bosra Sham	4	Kieren Fallon	Henry Cecil	2:07.37
1998	Insatiable	5	Michael Kinane	Sir Michael Stoute	2:09.99
1999	Chester House	4	Kieren Fallon	Henry Cecil	2:06.54
2000	Shiva	5	Richard Quinn	Henry Cecil	2:13.90
2001	Border Arrow	6	Frankie Dettori	Ian Balding	2:08.69
2002	Potemkin	4	Dane O'Neill	Richard Hannon Sr.	2:09.97
2003	Sights on Gold	4	Frankie Dettori	Saeed bin Suroor	2:07.68
2004	Bandari	5	Willie Supple	Mark Johnston	2:10.65
2005	New Morning	4	Philip Robinson	Michael Jarvis	2:08.01
2006	Notnowcato	4	Michael Kinane	Sir Michael Stoute	2:13.92
2007	Take a Bow	6	Jim Crowley	Patrick Chamings	2:08.75
2008	Smokey Oakey	4	Jimmy Quinn	Mark Tompkins	2:11.57
2009	Cima de Triomphe	4	Christophe Lemaire	Luca Cumani	2:06.60
2010	Stotsfold	7	Adam Kirby	Walter Swinburn	2:05.73
2011	Workforce	4	Ryan Moore	Sir Michael Stoute	2:09.97
2012	Carlton House	4	Ryan Moore	Sir Michael Stoute	2:08.38
2013	Mukhadram	4	Paul Hanagan	William Haggas	2:11.78
2014	Sharestan	6	Kieren Fallon	Saeed bin Suroor	2:23.46
2015	Western Hymn	4	James Doyle	John Gosden	2:06.55
2016	Time Test	4	Ryan Moore	Roger Charlton	2:06.18
2017	Autocratic	4	Ryan Moore	Sir Michael Stoute	2:07.10
2018	Poet's Word	5	Ryan Moore	Sir Michael Stoute	2:13.99
2019	Regal Reality	4	Ryan Moore	Sir Michael Stoute	2:05.84
2020 (Note: The 2020 race was run at Haydock Park in June, due to the COVID-19 pandemic in the United Kingdom)	Lord North	4	Robert Havlin	John Gosden	2:11.74
2021	Euchen Glen	8	Paul Mulrennan	Jim Goldie	2:14.19
2022	Bay Bridge	4	Ryan Moore	Sir Michael Stoute	2:08.10
2023	Hukum	6	Jim Crowley	Owen Burrows	2:08.92
2024	Royal Rhyme	4	Clifford Lee	Karl Burke	2:10.70
2025	Almaqam	4	Oisin Murphy	Ed Walker	2:06.03
2026	Ombudsman	5	William Buick	John & Thady Gosden	2:06.44

== See also ==
- Horse racing in Great Britain
- List of British flat horse races
