= Moon Madness (horse) =

British-bred Thoroughbred racehorse

- Sire: Vitiges
- Grandsire: Phaeton
- Dam: Castle Moon
- Damsire: Kalamoun
- Sex: Stallion
- Foaled: 1983
- Country: United Kingdom
- Colour: Bay
- Breeder: Lavina, Duchess of Norfolk
- Owner: Lavina, Duchess of Norfolk
- Trainer: John L. Dunlop
- Record: 24:10-1-5

Major wins
- King George V Stakes (1986); Scottish Derby (1986); St. Leger Stakes (1986); Grand Prix de Saint-Cloud (1987); Geoffrey Freer Stakes (1987); Cumberland Lodge Stakes (1987); Yorkshire Cup (1988)

Moon Madness (foaled 1983), was a British Thoroughbred racehorse and sire. In a career which lasted from September 1985 until November 1988, he ran twenty-four times and won ten races. He recorded his most important success when winning the Classic St. Leger Stakes as a three-year-old in 1986, the same year in which he also won the King George V Stakes, and the Scottish Derby. He continued to race for the next two seasons in major middle-distance and staying races, with his victories including the Grand Prix de Saint-Cloud, the Geoffrey Freer Stakes the Cumberland Lodge Stakes and the Yorkshire Cup. He later stood as a stallion in Europe and Japan.

== Background ==
Moon Madness was a very dark bay horse bred by his owner Lavina, Duchess of Norfolk. He was the most successful runner sired by Vitiges, who was one of the best European colts of his generation, winning the Prix Morny and the Champion Stakes. Moon Madness's dam, Castle Moon, produced seven other winners including the Coronation Cup winner Sheriff's Star. The Duchess sent her colt into training with John Dunlop at Arundel in Sussex. Moon Madness was ridden in most of his races by the veteran Irish jockey Pat Eddery.

== Racing career ==
=== 1985: two-year-old season ===
Moon Madness made his only appearance as a two-year-old in a maiden race at Goodwood Racecourse in which he finished fourth, beaten four and half lengths by Faraway Dancer, a colt who went on to finish fourth in the following year's Epsom Derby. Timeform described him as colt who was "likely to improve".

=== 1986: three-year-old season ===
Moon Madness began his three-year-old season by winning minor handicap races including victories at Newmarket and Haydock. He recorded his first important success when winning the King George V Stakes, a handicap race for three-year-olds at Royal Ascot in "impressive" style. He was then moved up to Listed class and won the Scottish Derby at Ayr. In August he was sent to York to contest the Great Voltigeur Stakes, an important trial race for the St Leger in which he finished third behind Nisnas and Mashkour. It was his first defeat after five successive wins.

In the St Leger at Doncaster Racecourse, Moon Madness started 9/2 third favourite in a field of eight runners with the filly Untold, winner of the Yorkshire Oaks being made favourite. Ridden by Pat Eddery, Moon Madness drew away from his opponents in the straight to win "comfortably" by four lengths from Celestial Storm and Untold. Later that autumn he finished third to Allez Milord and Baby Turk in the Preis von Europa.

=== 1987: four-year-old season ===
As a four-year-old, Moon Madness began by finishing fourth to Mtoto in the Brigadier Gerard Stakes and then finished third in the Hardwicke Stakes at Royal Ascot behind Orban. He recorded his most important victory of the season in France, winning the Grand Prix de Saint-Cloud from the future Prix de l'Arc de Triomphe winner Tony Bin. He returned to England to contest the King George VI and Queen Elizabeth Stakes, but finished unplaced behind Reference Point. In August, Moon Madness won the Geoffrey Freer Stakes, beating a field which included Legal Bid and Ibn Bey (runner-up in the Breeders' Cup Classic).

In Autumn, Moon Madness was sent to Germany where he finished second to Acatenango in the Grosser Preis von Baden. At Ascot he won his third major prize of the season when he won the Cumberland Lodge Stakes from Knockando and Mashkour, being given "perfect handling" by Eddery to win from the front. On his final appearance of the year he led the field for much of the way in the Japan Cup before being overtaken in the straight and finishing fifth.

=== 1988: five-year-old season ===
On his 1988 debut, Moon Madness started the 6/5 favourite for the Yorkshire Cup and won "smoothly" by one and a half lengths from Lake Erie

In June, Moon Madness finished third behind Triptych in the Coronation Cup at Epsom and third again behind Almaarad in the Hardwicke Stakes at Royal Ascot. He finished last of the ten runners behind Mtoto in the King George VI and Queen Elizabeth Stakes, and was sixth behind Top Class in the Geoffrey Freer Stakes.

In his last race, Moon Madness ran for the second time in the Japan Cup, finishing sixth behind Pay the Butler.

== Stud career ==
Moon Madness stood as a stallion in Europe and Japan, but had very little success as a sire of winners in either location. He was exported from Japan to France in 1994.

== Pedigree ==
Pedigree of Moon Madness (GB), bay stallion, 1983
Sire Vitiges (FR) 1973	Phaeton (IRE); 1964	Sicambre	Prince Bio*
Sire Vitiges (FR) 1973	Phaeton (IRE); 1964	Sicambre	Sif
Sire Vitiges (FR) 1973	Phaeton (IRE); 1964	Pasquinade	Vandale
Sire Vitiges (FR) 1973	Phaeton (IRE); 1964	Pasquinade	Mlle Paganini
Sire Vitiges (FR) 1973	Vale (FR); 1959	Verrieres	Palestine*
Sire Vitiges (FR) 1973	Vale (FR); 1959	Verrieres	Serre Chaude
Sire Vitiges (FR) 1973	Vale (FR); 1959	Calliopsis	Prince Chevalier
Sire Vitiges (FR) 1973	Vale (FR); 1959	Calliopsis	Calluna
Dam Castle Moon (GB) 1975	Kalamoun (GB); 1970	Zeddaan	Grey Sovereign
Dam Castle Moon (GB) 1975	Kalamoun (GB); 1970	Zeddaan	Vareta
Dam Castle Moon (GB) 1975	Kalamoun (GB); 1970	Kharunissa	Prince Bio*
Dam Castle Moon (GB) 1975	Kalamoun (GB); 1970	Kharunissa	Palariva*
Dam Castle Moon (GB) 1975	Fotheringay (FR); 1964	Right Royal	Owen Tudor
Dam Castle Moon (GB) 1975	Fotheringay (FR); 1964	Right Royal	Bastia
Dam Castle Moon (GB) 1975	Fotheringay (FR); 1964	La Fresnes	Court Martial
Dam Castle Moon (GB) 1975	Fotheringay (FR); 1964	La Fresnes	Pin Stripe (Family:8-c)

* Moon Madness is inbred 4S x 4D to the stallion Prince Bio, meaning that he appears fourth generation on the sire side of his pedigree and fourth generation on the dam side of his pedigree.

* Moon Madness is inbred 4S x 5D to the stallion Palestine, meaning that he appears fourth generation on the sire side of his pedigree and fifth generation (via Palariva) on the dam side of his pedigree.
