= St Simon Stakes =

Flat horse race in Britain

- Class: Group 3
- Location: Newbury Racecourse; Newbury, England
- Inaugurated: 1969
- Race type: Flat / Thoroughbred
- Sponsor: BetVictor
- Website: Newbury

Race information
- Distance: 1m 4f (2,414 m)
- Surface: Turf
- Track: Left-handed
- Qualification: Three-years-old and up
- Weight: 9 st 0 lb (3yo); 9 st 6 lb (4yo+); Allowances; 3 lb for fillies and mares Penalties; 7 lb for Group 1 winners * 5 lb for Group 2 winners * 3 lb for Group 3 winners * * since 31 March
- Purse: £75,000 (2025); 1st: £42,533

St Simon Stakes
2026
Aegean Prince	Royal Playwright	Al Qareem

Previous years
2025
Hamish	Ancient Wisdom	Sea Scout
2024
Max Vega	Danielle	Al Aasy
2023
Hamish	Al Qareem	King Of Conquest
2022
Max Vega	Hamish	Grand Alliance
2021
Ilaraab	Max Vega	Morando

2020-2011
2020
Euchen Glen	Natural History	Litigator
2018
Morando	Young Rascal	Scarlet Dragon
2017
Best Solution	Raheen House	Danehill Kodiac
2016
Duretto	Mountain Bell	Kings Fete
2015
Koora	Melodious	Moderah
2014
Sky Hunter	Island Remede	Battalion
2013
Cubanita	Nichols Canyon	Cocktail Queen
2012
Hazel Lavery	Noble Mission	Songcraft
2011
Beaten Up	Al Kazeem	Barbican

2010-2001
2010
Clowance	Poet	Dreamspeed
2009
High Heeled	Tastahil	Harbinger
2008
Buccellati	Blue Monday	Sell Out
2007
Crime Scene	Ivy Creek	Regime
2006
Short Skirt	Mountain	Orcadian
2005
Day Flight	Self Defense	Munsef
2004
Orcadian	Frank Sonata	Self Defense
2003
Imperial Dancer	High Accolade	Dubai Success
2002
The Whistling Teal	Warrsan	Nysaean
2001
High Pitched	Head In The Clouds	Mubtaker

2000-1991
2000
Wellbeing	Marienbard	Boreas
1999
Signorina Cattiva	Salford Express	Salmon Ladder
1998
Dark Moondancer	Delilah	The Glow-Worm
1997
Kaliana	Kutta	Busy Flight
1996
Salmon Ladder	Kutta	Eva Luna
1995
Phantom Gold	Asterita	Whitechapel
1994
Persian Brave	Strategic Choice	Duke Of Eurolink
1993
Kithanga	Anna Of Saxony	Linpac West
1992
Up Anchor	Spring	Zinaad
1991
Further Flight	Filia Ardross	Always Friendly

1990-1988
1990
Down The Flag	Hajade	Spritsail
1989
Sesame	Sudden Victory	Spritsail
1988
Upend	Apache	Al Mufti

The St Simon Stakes is a Group 3 flat horse race in Great Britain open to thoroughbreds aged three years or older. It is run at Newbury over a distance of 1 mile and 4 furlongs (2,414 metres), and it is scheduled to take place each year in October.

== History ==
The event is named after St. Simon, an undefeated racehorse in the 1880s and subsequently a successful sire. It was established in 1969, and the first running was won by Rangong.

The present system of race grading was introduced in 1971, and the St Simon Stakes was initially given Group 2 status. By the end of the decade it was classed at Group 3 level. The St Simon Stakes is part of Newbury's last flat racing fixture of the year.

== Records ==
Most successful horse (2 wins):

- Jupiter Island – 1983, 1986
- Max Vega - 2022, 2024
- Hamish - 2023, 2025

Leading jockey (3 wins):

- Brian Taylor – Frascati (1971), Ballyhot (1973), Obraztsovy (1978)
- Pat Eddery – Main Reef (1979), Dark Moondancer (1998), Signorina Cattiva (1999)
- Michael Hills – Further Flight (1991), Persian Brave (1994), High Heeled (2009)

Leading trainer (5 wins):

- William Haggas - Beaten Up (2011), Young Rascal (2018), Ilaraab (2021), Hamish (2023, 2025)

== Winners ==
Year	Winner	Age	Jockey	Trainer	Time
1969	Rangong	4	Geoff Lewis	Noel Murless	2:36.80
1970	Politico	3	Geoff Lewis	Noel Murless	2:33.76
1971	Frascati	3	Brian Taylor	Noel Murless	2:37.83
1972	Knockroe	4	Eric Eldin	Peter Nelson	2:46.11
1973	Ballyhot	5	Brian Taylor	John Winter	2:41.86
1974	Never Return	3	Willie Carson	Robert Armstrong	2:46.45
1975	Dakota	4	Sandy Barclay	Sam Hall	2:46.95
1976	Mart Lane	3	Bruce Raymond	Seamus McGrath	2:55.83
1977	Hot Grove	3	Willie Carson	Fulke Johnson Houghton	2:44.96
1978	Obraztsovy	3	Brian Taylor	Ryan Price	2:32.76
1979	Main Reef	3	Pat Eddery	Henry Cecil	2:46.20
1980	Shining Finish	3	Steve Cauthen	Jeremy Tree	2:47.23
1981	Little Wolf	3	Graham Sexton	Dick Hern	2:40.27
1982	Abandoned due to waterlogging
1983	Jupiter Island	4	Philip Robinson	Clive Brittain	2:39.09
1984	Gay Lemur	4	Geoff Baxter	Bruce Hobbs	2:42.20
1985	Shardari	3	Walter Swinburn	Michael Stoute	2:35.87
1986	Jupiter Island	7	Tony Murray	Clive Brittain	2:45.37
1987	Lake Erie	4	Walter Swinburn	Michael Stoute	2:44.29
1988	Upend	3	Ray Cochrane	Henry Cecil	2:43.41
1989	Sesame	4	Gary Hind	David Morley	2:41.58
1990	Down the Flag	3	Bruce Raymond	Ben Hanbury	2:44.79
1991	Further Flight	5	Michael Hills	Barry Hills	2:38.18
1992	Up Anchor	3	Alan Munro	Paul Cole	2:44.22
1993	Kithanga	3	Jason Weaver	Luca Cumani	2:38.86
1994	Persian Brave	4	Michael Hills	Michael Bell	2:48.39
1995	Phantom Gold	3	Richard Hills	Lord Huntingdon	2:39.71
1996	Salmon Ladder	4	Richard Quinn	Paul Cole	2:39.69
1997	Kaliana	3	Royston Ffrench	Luca Cumani	2:36.38
1998 (Note: The 1998 and 2001 editions were held at Newmarket)	Dark Moondancer	3	Pat Eddery	Peter Chapple-Hyam	2:39.81
1999	Signorina Cattiva	3	Pat Eddery	John Dunlop	2:45.02
2000	Wellbeing	3	Richard Quinn	Henry Cecil	2:46.10
2001	High Pitched	3	Willie Ryan	Henry Cecil	2:31.83
2002	The Whistling Teal	6	Darryll Holland	Geoff Wragg	2:41.47
2003	Imperial Dancer	5	Ted Durcan	Mick Channon	2:35.20
2004	Orcadian	3	Martin Dwyer	James Eustace	2:53.11
2005	Day Flight	4	Richard Hughes	John Gosden	2:36.99
2006	Short Skirt	3	Ryan Moore	Sir Michael Stoute	2:41.74
2007	Crime Scene	4	Ted Durcan	Saeed bin Suroor	2:42.21
2008	Buccellati	4	William Buick	Andrew Balding	2:45.51
2009	High Heeled	3	Michael Hills	Barry Hills	2:40.91
2010	Clowance	5	Richard Hughes	Roger Charlton	2:40.45
2011	Beaten Up	3	Johnny Murtagh	William Haggas	2:31.75
2012	Hazel Lavery	3	Eddie Ahern	Charles Hills	2:44.33
2013	Cubanita	4	Jim Crowley	Ralph Beckett	2:43.62
2014	Sky Hunter	4	James Doyle	Saeed bin Suroor	2:44.52
2015	Koora	3	Jamie Spencer	Luca Cumani	2:48.75
2016	Duretto	4	Graham Lee	Andrew Balding	2:38.19
2017	Best Solution	3	Pat Cosgrave	Saeed bin Suroor	2:40.68
2018 (dh)	Morando; Young Rascal	5; 3	Rob Hornby; Jim Crowley	Andrew Balding; William Haggas	2:38.54
2019	Abandoned due to waterlogging
2020	Euchen Glen	7	Paul Mulrennan	Jim Goldie	2:50.49
2021	Ilaraab	4	Tom Marquand	William Haggas	2:43.00
2022	Max Vega	5	Rossa Ryan	Ralph Beckett	2:43.11
2023	Hamish	7	Richard Kingscote	William Haggas	2:36.84
2024	Max Vega	7	Rob Hornby	Ralph Beckett	2:50.90
2025	Hamish	9	Tom Marquand	William Haggas	2:42.46
2026	Aegean Prince	4	Kieran Shoemark	Charlie Appleby	2:35.89

== See also ==
- Horse racing in Great Britain
- List of British flat horse races
