= Hardwicke Stakes =

British horse race

- Class: Group 2
- Location: Ascot Racecourse; Ascot, England
- Inaugurated: 1879
- Race type: Flat / Thoroughbred
- Website: Ascot

Race information
- Distance: 1m 3f 211y (2,406 metres)
- Surface: Turf
- Track: Right-handed
- Qualification: Four-years-old and up
- Weight: 9 st 1 lb Allowances; 3 lb for fillies and mares
- Purse: £237,750 (2022); 1st: £134,828

Hardwicke Stakes
2026
Giavellotto	Kalpana	Goliath

Previous years
2025
Rebel's Romance	Al Riffa	Ghostwriter
2024
Isle Of Jura	Goliath	Middle Earth
2023
Pyledriver	West Wind Blows	Changingoftheguard
2022
Broome	Mostahdaf	Hurricane Lane
2021
Wonderful Tonight	Broome	Hukum

2020-2011
2020
Fanny Logan	Alounak	Defoe
2019
Defoe	Nagano Gold	Mirage Dancer
2018
Crystal Ocean	Red Verdon	Cliffs Of Moher
2017
Idaho	Barsanti	Chemical Charge
2016
Dartmouth	Highland Reel	Almodovar
2015
Snow Sky	Eagle Top	Postponed
2014
Telescope	Hillstar	Pether's Moon
2013
Thomas Chippendale	Dandino	Universal
2012
Sea Moon	Dunaden	Red Cadeaux
2011
Await The Dawn	Harris Tweed	Drunken Sailor

2010-2001
2010
Harbinger	Duncan	Barshiba
2009
Bronze Cannon	Campanologist	Dansant
2008
Macarthur	Multidimensional	Maraahel
2007
Maraahel	Scorpion	Mighty
2006
Maraahel	Mountain High	Enforcer
2005
Bandari	Maraahel	Gamut
2004
Doyen	High Accolade	Persian Majesty
2003
Indian Creek	Bollin Eric	Zindabad
2002
Zindabad	Storming Home	Millenary
2001
Sandmason	Zindabad	Mutafaweq

2000-1991
2000
Fruits Of Love	Yavana's Pace	Blueprint
1999
Fruits Of Love	Royal Anthem	Sea Wave
1998
Posidonas	Germano	Swain
1997
Predappio	Pilsudski	Whitewater Affair
1996
Oscar Schindler	Annus Mirabilis	Posidonas
1995
Beauchamp Hero	Midnight Legend	Bal Harbour
1994
Bobzao	Bob's Return	Wagon Master
1993
Jeune	Red Bishop	Highland Dress
1992
Rock Hopper	Sapience	Luchiroverte
1991
Rock Hopper	Topanoora	Spritsail

1990-1988
1990
Assatis	Ile De Nisky	Old Vic
1989
Assatis	Top Class	Emmson
1988
Almaarad	Infamy	Moon Madness

The Hardwicke Stakes is a Group 2 flat horse race in Great Britain open to horses aged four years or older. It is run at Ascot over a distance of 1 mile 3 furlongs and 211 yards (2,406 metres), and it is scheduled to take place each year in June.

== History ==
The event is named in honour of the 5th Earl of Hardwicke, who served as the Master of the Buckhounds in the 19th century. It was established in 1879, and it was originally open to horses aged three or older. The last three-year-old to win was Helioscope in 1949.

The Hardwicke Stakes is now held on the final day of the five-day Royal Ascot meeting. The leading horses often return to the venue to compete in the following month's King George VI and Queen Elizabeth Stakes. The first to win both races in the same year was Aureole in 1954, and the most recent was Harbinger in 2010.

== Records ==
Most successful horse (3 wins):

- Tristan – 1882, 1883, 1884

Leading jockey (7 wins):

- Lester Piggott – Elopement (1955), St Paddy (1961), Karabas (1970), Relay Race (1974), Meneval (1977), Critique (1982), Jupiter Island (1985)
- Pat Eddery – Charlie Bubbles (1975), Orange Bay (1976), Dihistan (1986), Assatis (1989), Rock Hopper (1991, 1992), Posidonas (1998)

Leading trainer (11 wins):

- Sir Michael Stoute – Dihistan (1986), Rock Hopper (1991, 1992), Maraahel (2006, 2007), Harbinger (2010), Sea Moon (2012), Telescope (2014), Snow Sky (2015), Dartmouth (2016), Crystal Ocean (2018)

== Winners since 1900 ==
Year	Winner	Age	Jockey	Trainer	Time
1900	Boniface	4	Ben Rigby	Tom Jennings Jr.	2:38.50
1901	Merry Gal	4	Lester Reiff	Jack Robinson	2:37.40
1902	Joshua	3	William Halsey	John Dawson	2:45.00
1903	Sceptre	4	Frank Hardy	Alec Taylor Jr.
1904	Rock Sand	4	Danny Maher	George Blackwell
1905	Batchelor's Button	6	Danny Maher	Charles Peck
1906	Wombwell	3	Skeets Martin	William Waugh
1907	Beppo	4	Billy Higgs	Fred Pratt
1908	Bembo	3	Walter Griggs	Richard Dawson	2:34.40
1909	Primer	4	Walter Earl	William Waugh	2:32.40
1910	Swynford	3	Frank Wootton	George Lambton
1911	Swynford	4	Frank Wootton	George Lambton
1912	Stedfast	4	Frank Wootton	George Lambton	2:34.60
1913	Lancaster	4	Danny Maher	Thomas Cannon Jr.	2:38.80
1914	Peter The Hermit	3	Ralph Watson	Fred Withington	2:29.40
1915–18	No race
1919	Sir Douglas	3	George Hulme	Atty Persse
1920	Black Gauntlet	3	Frank Bullock	Thomas Cannon Jr.	2:33.40
1921	Franklin	3	Steve Donoghue	Richard Dawson	2:39.60
1922	Welsh Spear	3	George Archibald	Peter Gilpin	2:30.40
1923	Chosroes	3	George Smith	Atty Persse	2:37.00
1924	Chosroes	4	George Archibald	Atty Persse	2:38.60
1925	Hurstwood	4	Vic Smyth	Alec Taylor Jr.	2:32.80
1926	Lancegaye	3	Steve Donoghue	Alec Taylor Jr.	2:58.00
1927	Coronach	4	Joe Childs	Fred Darling	2:36.00
1928	Foliation	5	Bobby Jones	Joseph Lawson	2:35.00
1929	Posterity	3	Leslie Cordell	Frederick Sneyd	2:38.00
1930	Alcester	4	Joe Childs	William Jarvis	2:40.40
1931	Orpen	3	Bobby Jones	Joseph Lawson	2:38.60
1932	Goyescas	4	Steve Donoghue	Basil Jarvis	2:34.00
1933	Limelight	4	Joe Childs	William Jarvis	2:36.20
1934	Cotoneaster	4	George Nicoll	Fred Templeman	2:35.80
1935	J R Smith	3	Gordon Richards	Cecil Boyd-Rochfort	2:39.80
1936	Corrida	4	Charlie Elliott	John Evelyn Watts	2:41.60
1937	Mid-day Sun	3	Michael Beary	Frank Butters	2:32.20
1938	Maranta	4	Tommy Weston	Joseph Lawson	2:34.00
1939	Pointis	3	Doug Smith	Frank Butters	2:44.20
1940–45	No race
1946	Priam	4	Charlie Elliott	Charles Semblat	2:50.00
1947	Nirgal	4	Charlie Elliott	Charles Semblat	2:41.40
1948	Sayajirao	4	Charlie Smirke	Sam Armstrong	2:42.00
1949	Helioscope	3	Joe Sime	Cecil Boyd-Rochfort	2:32.00
1950	Peter Flower	4	Bill Rickaby	Jack Jarvis	2:35.00
1951	Saturn	4	Doug Smith	George Colling	2:32.80
1952	Dynamiter	4	Charlie Elliott	Charles Semblat	2:34.40
1953	Guersant	4	Paul Blanc	Geoffroy Watson	2:39.40
1954	Aureole	5	Eph Smith	Cecil Boyd-Rochfort	2:38.20
1955	Elopement	4	Lester Piggott	Noel Murless	2:34.08
1956	Hugh Lupus	4	Rae Johnstone	Noel Murless	2:35.01
1957	Fric	5	Jean Deforge	Joseph Lawson	2:30.18
1958	Brioche	4	Edgar Britt	Charles Elsey	2:42.36
1959	Impatient	4	Jimmy Lindley	Towser Gosden	2:34.51
1960	Aggressor	5	Jimmy Lindley	Towser Gosden	2:40.15
1961	St Paddy	4	Lester Piggott	Noel Murless	2:33.86
1962	Aurelius	4	Scobie Breasley	Noel Murless	2:35.65
1963	Miralgo	4	Bill Williamson	Harry Wragg	2:37.69
1964	Abandoned due to waterlogging
1965	Soderini	4	Geoff Lewis	Staff Ingham	2:39.67
1966	Prominer	4	Des Lake	Paddy Prendergast	2:37.48
1967	Salvo	4	Ron Hutchinson	Harry Wragg	2:39.23
1968	Hopeful Venture	4	Sandy Barclay	Noel Murless	2:35.02
1969	Park Top	5	Geoff Lewis	Bernard van Cutsem	2:59.01
1970	Karabas	5	Lester Piggott	Bernard van Cutsem	2:30.59
1971	Ortis	4	Duncan Keith	Peter Walwyn	2:48.22
1972	Selhurst	4	Geoff Lewis	Noel Murless	2:32.63
1973	Rheingold	4	Yves Saint-Martin	Barry Hills	2:36.76
1974	Relay Race	4	Lester Piggott	Henry Cecil	2:31.00
1975	Charlie Bubbles	4	Pat Eddery	Peter Walwyn	2:29.87
1976	Orange Bay	4	Pat Eddery	Peter Walwyn	2:30.00
1977	Meneval	4	Lester Piggott	Vincent O'Brien	2:37.18
1978	Montcontour	4	Yves Saint-Martin	Maurice Zilber	2:33.33
1979	Obraztsovy	4	Brian Taylor	Ryan Price	2:32.15
1980	Scorpio	4	Philippe Paquet	François Boutin	2:32.18
1981	Pelerin	4	Brian Taylor	Harry Wragg	2:28.37
1982	Critique	4	Lester Piggott	Henry Cecil	2:29.89
1983	Stanerra	5	Brian Rouse	Frank Dunne	2:26.95
1984	Khairpour	5	Steve Cauthen	Fulke Johnson Houghton	2:30.79
1985	Jupiter Island	6	Lester Piggott	Clive Brittain	2:45.44
1986	Dihistan	4	Pat Eddery	Michael Stoute	2:29.32
1987	Orban	4	Steve Cauthen	Henry Cecil	2:43.03
1988	Almaarad	5	Willie Carson	John Dunlop	2:30.30
1989	Assatis	4	Pat Eddery	Guy Harwood	2:29.04
1990	Assatis	5	Ray Cochrane	Guy Harwood	2:32.53
1991	Rock Hopper (Note: Topanoora finished first in 1991, but he was relegated to second place following a stewards' inquiry)	4	Pat Eddery	Michael Stoute	2:30.20
1992	Rock Hopper	5	Pat Eddery	Michael Stoute	2:29.19
1993	Jeune	4	Ray Cochrane	Geoff Wragg	2:39.43
1994	Bobzao	5	John Reid	Terry Mills	2:27.36
1995	Beauchamp Hero	5	John Reid	John Dunlop	2:29.22
1996	Oscar Schindler	4	Michael Kinane	Kevin Prendergast	2:27.84
1997	Predappio	4	Gary Stevens	Saeed bin Suroor	2:32.14
1998	Posidonas	6	Pat Eddery	Paul Cole	2:34.79
1999	Fruits of Love	4	Olivier Peslier	Mark Johnston	2:28.70
2000	Fruits of Love	5	Olivier Peslier	Mark Johnston	2:31.10
2001	Sandmason	4	Willie Ryan	Henry Cecil	2:29.59
2002	Zindabad	6	Kevin Darley	Mark Johnston	2:31.18
2003	Indian Creek	5	Richard Quinn	David Elsworth	2:27.24
2004	Doyen	4	Frankie Dettori	Saeed bin Suroor	2:26.53
2005 (Note: The 2005 running took place at York)	Bandari	6	Willie Supple	Mark Johnston	2:26.28
2006	Maraahel	5	Richard Hills	Sir Michael Stoute	2:29.25
2007	Maraahel	6	Richard Hills	Sir Michael Stoute	2:35.47
2008	Macarthur	4	Johnny Murtagh	Aidan O'Brien	2:31.29
2009	Bronze Cannon	4	Jimmy Fortune	John Gosden	2:27.59
2010	Harbinger	4	Ryan Moore	Sir Michael Stoute	2:27.36
2011	Await the Dawn	4	Ryan Moore	Aidan O'Brien	2:38.40
2012	Sea Moon	4	Ryan Moore	Sir Michael Stoute	2:29.60
2013	Thomas Chippendale	4	Johnny Murtagh	Lady Cecil	2:30.65
2014	Telescope	4	Ryan Moore	Sir Michael Stoute	2:27.45
2015	Snow Sky	4	Pat Smullen	Sir Michael Stoute	2:31.51
2016	Dartmouth	4	Olivier Peslier	Sir Michael Stoute	2:32.06
2017	Idaho	4	Seamie Heffernan	Aidan O'Brien	2:28.94
2018	Crystal Ocean	4	Ryan Moore	Sir Michael Stoute	2:28.08
2019	Defoe	5	Andrea Atzeni	Roger Varian	2:31.09
2020	Fanny Logan	4	Frankie Dettori	John Gosden	2:34.49
2021	Wonderful Tonight	4	William Buick	David Menuisier	2:35.31
2022	Broome	6	Ryan Moore	Aidan O'Brien	2:30.07
2023	Pyledriver	6	P. J. McDonald	William Muir & Chris Grassick	2:29.60
2024	Isle Of Jura	4	Callum Shepherd	George Scott	2:32.19
2025	Rebel's Romance	7	William Buick	Charlie Appleby	2:28.23
2026	Giavellotto	7	Oisin Murphy	Marco Botti	2:27.91

== Earlier winners ==
- 1879: Chippendale
- 1880: Exeter *
- 1881: Peter
- 1882: Tristan
- 1883: Tristan
- 1884: Tristan
- 1885: Bendigo
- 1886: Ormonde
- 1887: Ormonde
- 1888: Minting
- 1889: Gulliver
- 1890: Amphion
- 1891: L'Abbesse de Jouarre
- 1892: St Damien
- 1893: Watercress
- 1894: Ravensbury
- 1895: Barbary
- 1896: Shaddock
- 1897: Bay Ronald
- 1898: Collar
- 1899: Ninus

* The 1880 winner Exeter was later exported to Argentina and renamed El Plata.

== See also ==
- Horse racing in Great Britain
- List of British flat horse races
