= Aggressor (horse) =

British-bred Thoroughbred racehorse

- Racing silks of Sir Harold Wernher
- Sire: Combat
- Grandsire: Big Game
- Dam: Phaetonia
- Damsire: Nearco
- Sex: Stallion
- Foaled: 1955
- Country: United Kingdom
- Colour: Bay
- Breeder: Someries Stud
- Owner: Sir Harold Wernher
- Trainer: Towser Gosden
- Record: 20:11-4-0

Major wins
- Solario Stakes (1957); Doonside Cup (1958); Coronation Stakes (1959); Cumberland Lodge Stakes (1959); John Porter Stakes (1960); Hardwicke Stakes (1960); King George VI and Queen Elizabeth Stakes (1960)

Aggressor (1955 – 1977) was a British Thoroughbred race horse and sire. In a racing career which lasted from 1957 until July 1960 he ran twenty times and won eleven races. In his first three seasons he showed solid form, winning races including the Solario Stakes, the Coronation Stakes and the Cumberland Lodge Stakes. He reached his peak as a five-year-old in 1960 when he won the John Porter Stakes and the Hardwicke Stakes before recording his biggest success when defeating the outstanding filly Petite Etoile in the King George VI and Queen Elizabeth Stakes.

== Background ==
Aggressor was a powerfully-built bay horse bred at the Someries Stud in Newmarket. He was sired by Combat, an undefeated racehorse whose nine wins included the 1947 Sussex Stakes. His dam, Phaetonia won twice and produced, in addition to Aggressor, the Ormonde Stakes winner High Perch and the Discovery Handicap winner Ben Lomond. As a daughter of the broodmare Phaetusa, she was a member of the same branch of Thoroughbred family 10-d which produced The Derby winner Reference Point.

As a yearling, Aggressor was moved to the Blackhall Stud in County Kildare. When Sir Harold Wernher and his trainer Cecil Boyd-Rochfort visited the stud in 1956 they were unimpressed with Aggressor and sent him to the sales. The colt failed to reach his 1,000 guineas reserve price. Wernher then sent the colt to be trained by Towser Gosden at Lewes, but did not enter Aggressor in any of the British Classic Races.

== Racing career ==
=== 1957: two-year-old season ===
Aggressor ran six times as a two-year-old in 1957. He won three times, taking the Bettisfield Plate at Haydock, the Solario Stakes at Sandown and the Euclid Nursery Handicap at Kempton.

=== 1958: three-year-old season ===
In 1958, won two of his five races. In April, he won the 2,000 Guineas Trial over seven furlongs at Kempton by four lengths, beating the Queen's colt Pall Mall into fourth. A month later, Pall Mall won the 2000 Guineas. Later in the year Aggressor was beaten at York and Ascot but won the Doonside Cup at Ayr and finished third to London Cry in the Cambridgeshire Handicap.

=== 1959: four-year-old season ===
As a four-year-old, Aggressor won three important races. In May he won the Coronation Stakes at Sandown. In summer he won the Chesterfield Cup, a valuable ten furlong handicap race at Goodwood. In September he won the Cumberland Lodge Stakes over one and a half miles at Ascot.

=== 1960: five-year-old season ===
Aggressor began his 1960 campaign by winning the John Porter Stakes at Newbury but was then beaten into third place by Lucky Guy and Barclay in the Coronation Stakes.

At Royal Ascot in June, Aggressor produced his best performance to date, beating the 1959 Epsom Derby winner Parthia in the Hardwicke Stakes. Aggressor and Parthia met again in the King George VI and Queen Elizabeth Stakes over the same course and distance a month later. The 2/5 favourite for the race was Prince Aly Khan's filly Petite Etoile, winner of the 1000 Guineas, Epsom Oaks, Sussex Stakes and Coronation Cup. Ridden by Jimmy Lindley, Aggressor, who was well-suited by the rain-softened ground went to the front in the straight and held off the challenge of Petite Etoile in the closing stages to win by half a length.

== Assessment ==
Aggressor was awarded a rating of 130 by Timeform in 1960.

In their book A Century of Champions, John Randall and Tony Morris rated Aggressor a "poor" winner of the King George VI and Queen Elizabeth Stakes.

== Stud record ==
Aggressor was not a notable success as a sire of winners. The most successful of his offspring was the filly Dibidale, who won the Irish Oaks and the Yorkshire Oaks in 1974 and was an unlucky loser of The Oaks, in which her saddle slipped in the closing stages.

Aggressor's daughter Aggravate (who won the Park Hill Stakes) was exported to Walter Jacobs's Fährhof Stud (near Bremen, Germany), where she foaled among others the German champion-racehorse and leading sire Acatenango.

== Sire line tree ==
- Aggressor
  - Streetfighter
    - Blockbuster
  - Fire Crest
  - Activator
  - Chivas Regal

== Pedigree ==
Pedigree of Aggressor (GB), bay stallion, 1955
Sire Combat	Big Game	Bahram	Blandford
Sire Combat	Big Game	Bahram	Friar's Daughter
Sire Combat	Big Game	Myrobella	Tetratema
Sire Combat	Big Game	Myrobella	Dolabella
Sire Combat	Commotion	Mieuxce	Massine
Sire Combat	Commotion	Mieuxce	L'Olivete
Sire Combat	Commotion	Riot	Colorado*
Sire Combat	Commotion	Riot	Lady Juror
Dam Phaetonia	Nearco	Pharos	Phalaris*
Dam Phaetonia	Nearco	Pharos	Scapa Flow
Dam Phaetonia	Nearco	Nogara	Havresac
Dam Phaetonia	Nearco	Nogara	Catnip
Dam Phaetonia	Phaetusa	Hyperion	Gainsborough
Dam Phaetonia	Phaetusa	Hyperion	Selene
Dam Phaetonia	Phaetusa	Saddle Tor	Hurry On
Dam Phaetonia	Phaetusa	Saddle Tor	Leighon Tor (Family 10-d)

* Aggressor is inbred 5S x 4D to the stallion Phalaris, meaning that he appears fifth generation (via Colorado) on the sire side of his pedigree, and fourth generation on the dam side of his pedigree.
