= Petite Etoile =

British-bred Thoroughbred racehorse (b. 1956

- Sire: Petition
- Grandsire: Fair Trial
- Dam: Star Of Iran
- Damsire: Bois Roussel
- Sex: Filly
- Foaled: 1956
- Country: Great Britain
- Colour: Grey
- Breeder: Aga Khan III & Prince Aly Khan
- Owner: Prince Aly Khan; Aga Khan IV
- Trainer: Noel Murless
- Record: 19: 14-5-0
- Earnings: £72,626

Major wins
- 1000 Guineas (1959); Epsom Oaks (1959); Sussex Stakes (1959); Yorkshire Oaks (1959); Champion Stakes (1959); Victor Wild Stakes (1960); Coronation Cup (1960, 1961); Coronation Stakes (1961); Rous Memorial Stakes (1961)

Awards
- British Horse of the Year (1959)

Honours
- Timeform Top-rated three-year-old filly (1959); Timeform Top-rated Older Female (1960, 1961); Timeform rating: 134
- Last updated on 21 September 2023

Petite Etoile (1956 – after 1975) was a British Thoroughbred racehorse. In a career which lasted from June 1958 until September 1961, she won fourteen of her nineteen races and finished second in the other five. After showing promising, but unexceptional form in 1958, she improved to be the British Horse of the Year in 1959, winning all six of her races, including the Classic 1000 Guineas and Epsom Oaks. She remained in training for two further seasons, winning major races including consecutive runnings of the Coronation Cup.

== Background ==
Petite Etoile, whose name was French for "Little Star", was a grey filly bred by HH Aga Khan III and his son Prince Aly Khan. She was sired by Petition, whose wins included the Eclipse Stakes. Petite Etoile's dam, Star of Iran, from whom she inherited her grey coat was a full sister to the Prix de l'Arc de Triomphe winner Migoli. As a descendant of Mumtaz Mahal, Petite Etoile was a member of the same branch of Thoroughbred family 9-c which produced Shergar, Oh So Sharp and Risen Star. The filly was sent into training with Noel Murless at his Warren Place stables in Newmarket, Suffolk. During her racing career, Petite Etoile was a Dapple grey although, like most grey horses, her coat lightened with age.

== Racing career ==
=== 1958: two-year-old season ===
On her first race as a two-year-old Petite Etoile was beaten by eight lengths by a colt named Chris in a two-horse race at Manchester Racecourse. Chris went on to become a top class sprinter, winning the King's Stand Stakes in 1959. In July she won the Star Stakes at Sandown and finished second to Krakenwake in the Molecomb Stakes at Goodwood. In August Petite Etoile won the Rose Stakes at Sandown very easily at odds of 1/6. At the end of the season, she was rated fourteen pounds below the top-rated colt Tudor Melody and nine pounds behind the top-rated fillies Rosalba and Lindsay. She was considered a fast filly who would be unlikely to make an impression beyond sprint distances.

=== 1959: three-year-old season ===
Petite Etoile began her three-year-old season in the Free Handicap over seven furlongs at Newmarket Racecourse. She was ridden by Doug Smith and carried top weight to victory. Noel Murless's stable jockey Lester Piggott having chosen to ride the Queen's filly Short Sentence .In the 1000 Guineas two weeks later she started at odds of 8/1 in field of fourteen fillies. Piggott had chosen to ride Collyria for Murless . Prince Aly Khan's rider George Moore was assigned to ride Prince Aly Khan's favoured representative Paraguana, and Petite Etoile was ridden again by Doug Smith. Petite Etoile stayed on strongly in the closing stages to win by a length from Rosalba, with Paraguana four lengths back in third. Doug Smith was later to admit that he had kept quiet about the feel Petite Etoile had given him in the Free Handicap in the hope that Piggott would choose one of Murless's two other contenders Collyria or Rose of Medina and that he would keep the ride. After that Lester Piggott took over on Petite Etoile, although there were concerns that she would not stay the 1m 4f of the Oaks trip. .

A month later, Petite Etoile started 11/2 second favourite for the Oaks, in which she was ridden by Lester Piggott. The favourite was the undefeated Cantelo, a filly whose wins included the Royal Lodge Stakes against colts and who was regarded as a superior stayer, whereas Petite Etoile's pedigree led to doubts about her stamina over one and a half miles. Petite Etoile was settled by Lester Piggott in the early stages before moving up into third place on the turn into the straight. She accelerated past Cantelo a furlong from the finish and won easily by three lengths. Later that year, Cantelo won the St. Leger Stakes.

Petite Etoile won her remaining races in 1959. In July she moved down to one mile to win the Sussex Stakes against colts at Goodwood. In August, she moved back up to a mile and a half to win the Yorkshire Oaks at York Racecourse. On her final start of the year she contested the Champion Stakes at Newmarket and won by half a length from the previously unbeaten Irish St Leger winner Barclay with the French-trained Javelot in third. An unusual feature of the race was that the Queen was fined by the Jockey Club for the late withdrawal of her horse Above Suspicion.

=== 1960: four-year-old season ===
On Petite Etoile's 1960 debut she won the Victor Wild Stakes over ten furlongs at Kempton Park Racecourse. Following the death of Prince Aly Khan in May 1960, the ownership of Petite Etoile was inherited by his son Aga Khan IV. She was then sent to Epsom for the Coronation Cup in which she was pitted against The Derby winner Parthia. Starting at odds of 1/3 she was restrained by Piggott until the closing stages where she displayed "devastating speed", to accelerate past Parthia, "as if he were a selling plater" and win by one and a half lengths. Following the race, her owners reportedly turned down an offer of £320,000 for the filly from an American source.

In the King George VI and Queen Elizabeth Stakes at Ascot in July, Petite Etoile started 2/5 favourite, despite the rain-softened ground. Before the race, Lester Piggott said that he could see no danger to the filly and described her as "the best I have ever ridden". Piggott held the filly up at the rear of the field before attempting to challenge on the inside rail. Unable to obtain a clear run, he was forced to switch Petite Etoile to the outside, and despite finishing strongly Petite Etoile was beaten half a length by the five-year-old Aggressor. Petite Etoile then succumbed to the epidemic of coughing which affected many British racing stables, and missed the rest of the season, leading to reports that she would be retired.

=== 1961: five-year-old season ===
As a five-year-old Petite Etoile began her season with a narrow victory over Wordpam in the Coronation Stakes at Sandown. She then claimed a second Coronation Cup, beating Vienna by a neck. At Royal Ascot she took the Rous Memorial Stakes over one mile. Petite Etoile was then moved back up to one and a half miles for the Aly Khan International Memorial Gold Cup, named after her late owner, in which she finished second to High Hat.

Petite Etoile returned to one mile for her last two races. In September, she was an easy winner of the Scarborough Stakes at Doncaster. Later in the same month she was beaten half a length by Le Levanstell when starting 2/9 favourite for the Queen Elizabeth II Stakes at Ascot.

== Assessment and honours ==
Petite Etoile was rated at 134 by Timeform in 1959, making her the highest-rated three-year-old filly of the year. The rating was the highest ever awarded to a British three-year-old filly and remained so until the sprinter Habibti was rated at 136 in 1983. Petite Etoile was again rated at 134 in 1960, making her the equal highest-rated older horse in Europe, alongside the sprinter Bleep-Bleep. In 1961 she was the highest-rated older female with a rating of 131.

In 1959, the Bloodstock Breeders' Review conducted their first Horse of the Year poll. Petite Etoile won the award, taking 90% of the votes. Petite Etoiles career earnings of £72,624 set a record for a female racehorse trained in Britain or Ireland, which stood until it was surpassed by Park Top in 1969.

Noel Murless described her as "a peculiar animal ... unique in every way" who was only happy when exercising with other grey horses. In their book A Century of Champions, John Randall and Tony Morris rated Petite Etoile the sixth best filly trained in the Britain and Ireland in the 20th century and the best British filly of the 1950s.

== Stud career ==
Petite Etoile's career as a broodmare was disappointing. She produced only three foals, none of whom showed merit as racehorses. However, she was the progenitor of unbeaten dual French classic- and Prix de l'Arc de Triomphe-winning filly Zarkava, who was also named Cartier Horse of the Year.

== Pedigree ==
Pedigree of Petite Etoile (GB), grey mare, 1956
Sire Petition (GB) 1944	Fair Trial (GB); 1932	Fairway	Phalaris
Sire Petition (GB) 1944	Fair Trial (GB); 1932	Fairway	Scapa Flow
Sire Petition (GB) 1944	Fair Trial (GB); 1932	Lady Juror	Son-in-Law
Sire Petition (GB) 1944	Fair Trial (GB); 1932	Lady Juror	Lady Josephine
Sire Petition (GB) 1944	Art Paper (GB); 1933	Artists Proof	Gainsborough
Sire Petition (GB) 1944	Art Paper (GB); 1933	Artists Proof	Clear Evidence
Sire Petition (GB) 1944	Art Paper (GB); 1933	Quire	Fairy King
Sire Petition (GB) 1944	Art Paper (GB); 1933	Quire	Queen Carbine
Dam Star of Iran (GB) 1949	Bois Roussel (FR); 1935	Vatout	Prince Chimay
Dam Star of Iran (GB) 1949	Bois Roussel (FR); 1935	Vatout	Vashti
Dam Star of Iran (GB) 1949	Bois Roussel (FR); 1935	Plucky Liege	Spearmint
Dam Star of Iran (GB) 1949	Bois Roussel (FR); 1935	Plucky Liege	Concertina
Dam Star of Iran (GB) 1949	Mah Iran (GB); 1939	Bahram	Blandford
Dam Star of Iran (GB) 1949	Mah Iran (GB); 1939	Bahram	Friar's Daughter
Dam Star of Iran (GB) 1949	Mah Iran (GB); 1939	Mah Mahal	Gainsborough
Dam Star of Iran (GB) 1949	Mah Iran (GB); 1939	Mah Mahal	Mumtaz Mahal (Family:9-c)
