= Jupiter Island (horse) =

British-bred Thoroughbred racehorse

- Racing silks of S M Threadwell & Marquess of Tavistock
- Sire: St. Paddy
- Grandsire: Aureole
- Dam: Mrs Moss
- Damsire: Reform
- Sex: Stallion
- Foaled: 23 February 1979
- Country: United Kingdom
- Colour: Bay
- Breeder: Marquess of Tavistock
- Owner: S. M. Threadwell; Marquess of Tavistock
- Trainer: Clive Brittain
- Record: 41: 14-4-6

Major wins
- Ebor Handicap (1983); St. Simon Stakes (1983, 1986); John Porter Stakes (1985); Hardwicke Stakes (1985); Prix du Conseil de Paris (1985); Japan Cup (1986)

Awards
- Timeform rating: 74 (1981), 94 (1982), 119 (1983), 116 (1984), 126 (1985), 121 (1986)

Jupiter Island (23 February 1979 – 25 July 1998) was a British Thoroughbred racehorse and sire. He won fourteen of his forty-one races in a six-year racing career which lasted from 1981 until 1986. He showed useful but unexceptional form until the late summer of 1983 when he won the Ebor Handicap and followed up with a win in the St. Simon Stakes. He reached his peak as a six-year-old in 1985 when he won the John Porter Stakes, Hardwicke Stakes and Prix du Conseil de Paris. His final season was disrupted by injury problems, but he ended his career with his biggest success when he became the first British-trained horse to win the Japan Cup.

== Background ==
Jupiter Island was a "close-coupled, quite attractive" but "rather narrow" horse with a white coronet on his left hind foot, bred by the Marquess of Tavistock. He was one of many winners produced by Tavistock's broodmare Mrs Moss: the others were almost all fast-maturing sprinters including Krayyan (National Stakes), Precocious (Gimcrack Stakes) and Pushy (Queen Mary Stakes). The Marquess of Tavistock was staying on Jupiter Island in Florida when the colt was foaled and named the horse after the island.

As a yearling he was sent to the Newmarket Houghton sales where he was sold for 10,000 guineas to the trainer Clive Brittain. He entered the ownership of S. M. Threadwell and was trained by Brittain at Carlburg Stable in Newmarket, Suffolk. Brittain has been regarded as a pioneer of intercontinental racing, sending Bold Arrangement to finish second in the Kentucky Derby and winning the Breeders' Cup Turf with the filly Pebbles.

== Racing career ==
=== 1981 & 1982: two and three-year-old seasons ===
Jupiter Island ran twice as a two-year-old, and showed some promise despite finishing unplaced on both occasions. Timeform described him as being "the type to improve with racing and longer distances". In the following year he ran ten times and won three races. His first success came in a minor race over one and a half miles at Wolverhampton Racecourse and he later won a handicap race at Yarmouth. He produced his best performance in September at Ascot Racecourse when he won a one and a half mile handicap by eight lengths on soft ground.

=== 1983 & 1984: four and five-year-old season ===
Jupiter Island was beaten in his first three races as a four-year-old before winning the Air New Zealand Handicap over one and a half mile at Newmarket Racecourse, beating Keelby Kavalier by a neck. His win meant that he had to carry a seven-pound weight penalty in the Ebor Handicap over fourteen furlongs at York eleven days later. Ridden by Lester Piggott and starting at odds of 9/1, he took the lead in the straight and won easing down by one and a half length from Abdoun. In September Jupiter Island finished second in the Esal Bookmakers Handicap at Doncaster and then won the Coral Autumn Cup at Newbury. After winning another handicap at Newmarket he was moved up in class to contest the Group Three St Simon Stakes at Newbury on 22 October by which time he was being described as "one of the most improved horses in training" in the British press. With Piggott booked to ride at Doncaster on the same day, Jupiter Island was ridden by Philip Robinson and started at odds of 3/1. He turned into the straight in seventh place but quickly took the lead and won by two lengths from the filly So True.

Jupiter Island's only win in nine starts as a five-year-old came when he won the Listed Aston Park takes at Newbury in June. He ran well in defeat on several occasions, finishing second in the Jockey Club Stakes and the Hardwicke Stakes and third in the Grand Prix de Deauville. When moved up to the highest level he finished sixth to Teenoso in the Group One King George VI and Queen Elizabeth Stakes at Ascot in July.

=== 1985: six-year-old season ===
On his six-year-old debut, Jupiter Island, ridden by Greville Starkey won the Group Three John Porter Stakes at Newbury, beating Ilium and Gay Lemur at odds of 11/2. He was bought back from Threadwell by his breeder Lord Tavistock with the intention of standing him as a breeding stallion but horse remained in training with Brittain. At Royal Ascot in June he started at odds of 85/40 for the Group Two Hardwicke Stakes. Racing on his favoured soft ground, and ridden by Piggott, he won impressively from Seismic Wave and Raft. The ground was firm at Newmarket on 9 July when he finished fourth of the five runners behind Petoski in the Princess of Wales's Stakes.

Jupiter Island was injured when finishing unplaced in the Grand Prix de Deauville and did not run again until the Prix de l'Arc de Triomphe at Longchamp Racecourse in October. Starting the 99/1 outsider in a field of fifteen runners he finished eighth behind the subsequently disqualified Sagace. Two weeks later, the horse returned to France for the Group Two Prix du Conseil de Paris over the same course and distance. Ridden by Tony Ives, Jupiter Island accelerated clear of his opponents in the straight and won convincingly by three lengths from Baby Turk and Saint Estephe. On what was intended to be his final racecourse appearance, Jupiter Island represented Britain in the 34th running of the Washington, D.C. International Stakes at Laurel Park Racecourse. He was again ridden by Ives and started at odds of 10/1 with Strawberry Road starting favourite after his narrow defeat by Pebbles in the Breeders' Cup Turf. Jupiter Island finished strongly to finish third, beaten a length and a nose by Vanlandingham and Yashgan, with Strawberry Road and the Belmont Stakes winner Creme Fraiche unplaced.

=== 1986: seven-year-old season ===
Plans to retire Jupiter Island to stud were revised after his run at Laurel Park, and he remained in training as a seven-year-old with the San Juan Capistrano Handicap at Santa Anita Park as his early season objective. Jupiter Island was sent to California in April but sustained a foot injury before the race and finished third behind Dahar and Mountain Bear.

Jupiter Island took a long time to recover from his exertions in California and did not race again for six months. He eventually returned in late October in the St Simon Stakes, the race he had won as a four-year-old in 1983. Ridden by Tony Murray, he started at odds of 6/1 and won by one and a half lengths from the three-year-old Verd-Antique. On his final appearance, Jupiter Island was sent to Japan to contest the sixth running of the Japan Cup at Tokyo Racecourse on 23 November. The fourteen runner field included challengers from the United Kingdom, France (Triptych), New Zealand (Waverley Star), Canada and the United States, while the "home team" was headed by the Tenno Sho winner Sakura Yutaka O and the 1985 Japanese Champion three-year-old Miho Shinzan. Jupiter Island, who had been flown out two weeks before the race to give him an opportunity to acclimatise to the local conditions, was ridden by Pat Eddery and started at odds of 13.9/1 in front of a crowd of almost 100,000. Jupiter Island was in last place on the turn into the straight, but produced a strong late run to catch the British-trained three-year-old Allez Milord in the final strides and prevailed by a head after a "desperate finish". The result was only confirmed after an enquiry by racecourse stewards into possible interference by the winner in the closing stages and an attempted protest by Greville Starkey, the rider of the runner-up. Jupiter Island's victory earned more prize money for his owners than the horse had accumulated in his previous forty starts.

== Assessment ==
The independent Timeform organisation gave Jupiter Island a rating of 74 in 1981 and 94 in 1982. His improvement in the following year was recognised when he was given a rating of 119 as a four-year-old. He was not included in the official International Classification, but in the British Free Handicap he was rated sixteen pounds inferior to the top-rated older horse Diamond Shoal. In 1984 he was rated 116 by Timeform. Jupiter Island was given his highest Timeform rating of 126 in 1985, placing him ten pounds behind their Horse of the Year Pebbles, before being rated 121 in his final season.

== Stud record ==
Jupiter Island was retired from racing to become a breeding stallion at Elms Stud in Northamptonshire. He had very little success as a sire of flat race horses but had more impact as a National Hunt stallion. The best of his progeny was probably Mr Cool, who won fourteen races including the Ascot Hurdle in 2003 and the Long Distance Hurdle in 2005. Jupiter Island was pensioned from stud duty in 1997 due to heart problems and was relocated to the Bloomsbury Stud at Woburn Abbey. He died there on 25 July 1998 at the age of 19.

== Pedigree ==
Pedigree of Jupiter Island, bay stallion, 1979
Sire St. Paddy (GB) 1957	Aureole (GB); 1950	Hyperion	Gainsborough
Sire St. Paddy (GB) 1957	Aureole (GB); 1950	Hyperion	Selene
Sire St. Paddy (GB) 1957	Aureole (GB); 1950	Angelola	Donatello
Sire St. Paddy (GB) 1957	Aureole (GB); 1950	Angelola	Feola
Sire St. Paddy (GB) 1957	Edie Kelly (GB); 1950	Bois Roussel	Vatout
Sire St. Paddy (GB) 1957	Edie Kelly (GB); 1950	Bois Roussel	Plucky Liege
Sire St. Paddy (GB) 1957	Edie Kelly (GB); 1950	Caerlissa	Caerleon
Sire St. Paddy (GB) 1957	Edie Kelly (GB); 1950	Caerlissa	Sister Sarah
Dam Mrs Moss (GB) 1969	Reform (GB); 1964	Pall Mall	Palestine
Dam Mrs Moss (GB) 1969	Reform (GB); 1964	Pall Mall	Malapert
Dam Mrs Moss (GB) 1969	Reform (GB); 1964	Country House	Vieux Manoir
Dam Mrs Moss (GB) 1969	Reform (GB); 1964	Country House	Miss Coventry
Dam Mrs Moss (GB) 1969	Golden Plate (GB); 1964	Whistler	Panorama
Dam Mrs Moss (GB) 1969	Golden Plate (GB); 1964	Whistler	Farthing Damages
Dam Mrs Moss (GB) 1969	Golden Plate (GB); 1964	Good as Gold	Nimbus
Dam Mrs Moss (GB) 1969	Golden Plate (GB); 1964	Good as Gold	Gamble in Gold (Family:14-b)
