= Combat (horse) =

British-bred Thoroughbred racehorse

- Sire: Big Game
- Grandsire: Bahram
- Dam: Commotion
- Damsire: Mieuxce
- Sex: Stallion
- Foaled: 1944
- Country: Ireland
- Colour: Brown
- Breeder: John Arthur Dewar
- Owner: John Arthur Dewar
- Trainer: Fred Darling
- Record: 9:9-0-0

Major wins
- Windsor Castle Stakes (1946); Blue Riband Trial Stakes (1947); Rous Memorial Stakes (1947); Sussex Stakes (1947)

Combat (1944–1967) was an undefeated British Thoroughbred racehorse and sire. Despite winning all nine of his races, his career was largely overshadowed by that of his more celebrated stablemate Tudor Minstrel. He won all four of his races as a two-year-old in 1946 and all five in the following year including the Blue Riband Trial Stakes, Rous Memorial Stakes and Sussex Stakes. He was then retired to stud where he had limited success as a sire of winners.

== Background ==
Combat was a brown horse with a white coronet on his left hind leg bred by his owner John Arthur Dewar who inherited his Thoroughbred racehorses from his uncle, the Scottish whisky distiller Thomas Dewar, 1st Baron Dewar. These horses included Lady Juror, who became a successful broodmare, producing Fair Trial and the July Stakes winner Riot, the grand-dam of Combat. In the same year that Combat was foaled, Dewar bred Tudor Minstrel from another daughter of Lady Juror. Combat was from the first crop of foals sired by Big Game the best British colt of his generation whose wins included the 2000 Guineas and the Champion Stakes. Combat's dam Commotion won the Oaks Stakes in 1941 and became a successful broodmare: she also produced the St James's Palace Stakes winner Faux Tirage and the leading Argentinian sire Aristophanes. Dewar sent the colt into training with Fred Darling at Beckhampton in Wiltshire.

== Racing career ==
=== 1946: two-year-old season ===
As a two-year-old in 1946, Combat ran four times and won on each occasion. At Royal Ascot in June, he won the five furlong Windsor Castle Stakes. He also won the Champagne Stakes at Salisbury Racecourse. Darling and Dewar kept Combat away from his stable companion Tudor Minstrel.

=== 1947: three-year-old season ===
As a three-year-old, Combat did not contest the classics: the stable relied on Tudor Minstrel who won the 2000 Guineas and was beaten when favourite for The Derby. In spring, Combat won the Blue Riband Trial Stakes over eight and a half furlongs at Epsom Downs Racecourse, beating the future St Leger winner Sayajirao. In June, he returned to Royal Ascot where he won the Rous Memorial Stakes over one mile. In July, after winning the Sandringham Stakes, he was sent to Goodwood Racecourse for the Sussex Stakes. Ridden by Gordon Richards, he won at odds of 8/13 from Petition.

== Stud record ==
Combat was retired from racing to become a breeding stallion. The best of his offspring was Aggressor, who won the King George VI and Queen Elizabeth Stakes in 1960. He also sired the Irish Oaks winner Agar's Plough and the Longfellow Handicap winner Combustion. Orizaba champion 3 year old filly and horse of the year in Mexico, and one of the strongest female lines in Mexico.

Combat died of a twisted gut at the Aislabie Stud at Newmarket on 17 August 1967.

== Sire line tree ==
- Combat
  - Combustion
  - Aggressor
    - Streetfighter
      - Blockbuster
    - Fire Crest
    - Activator
    - Chivas Regal

== Pedigree ==
Pedigree of Combat (GB), brown stallion, 1944
Sire Big Game (GB) 1939	Bahram (GB); 1932	Blandford	Swynford
Sire Big Game (GB) 1939	Bahram (GB); 1932	Blandford	Blanche*
Sire Big Game (GB) 1939	Bahram (GB); 1932	Friar's Daughter	Friar Marcus
Sire Big Game (GB) 1939	Bahram (GB); 1932	Friar's Daughter	Garron Lass
Sire Big Game (GB) 1939	Myrobella (FR); 1930	Tetratema	The Tetrarch
Sire Big Game (GB) 1939	Myrobella (FR); 1930	Tetratema	Scotch Gift
Sire Big Game (GB) 1939	Myrobella (FR); 1930	Dolabella	White Eagle*
Sire Big Game (GB) 1939	Myrobella (FR); 1930	Dolabella	Gondolette
Dam Commotion (GB) 1938	Mieuxce (FR); 1933	Massine	Consols
Dam Commotion (GB) 1938	Mieuxce (FR); 1933	Massine	Mauri
Dam Commotion (GB) 1938	Mieuxce (FR); 1933	L'Olivete	Opott
Dam Commotion (GB) 1938	Mieuxce (FR); 1933	L'Olivete	Jonicole
Dam Commotion (GB) 1938	Riot (GB); 1929	Colorado	Phalaris
Dam Commotion (GB) 1938	Riot (GB); 1929	Colorado	Canyon
Dam Commotion (GB) 1938	Riot (GB); 1929	Lady Juror	Son-in-Law
Dam Commotion (GB) 1938	Riot (GB); 1929	Lady Juror	Lady Josephine (Family: 9-c)

* Combat is inbred 5S x 4S to the stallion White Eagle, meaning that he appears fifth generation (via Blanche) and fourth generation on the sire side of his pedigree.

== See also ==
- List of leading Thoroughbred racehorses
