= Park Top =

British-bred Thoroughbred racehorse (1964–1989)

- Sire: Kalydon
- Grandsire: Alycidon
- Dam: Nellie Park
- Damsire: Arctic Prince
- Sex: Filly
- Foaled: 1964
- Country: Great Britain
- Colour: Bay
- Breeder: Joan Scott, Buttermilk Stud, Oxon
- Owner: Andrew Cavendish, 11th Duke of Devonshire
- Trainer: Bernard van Cutsem
- Record: 24: 13-6-2
- Earnings: £136,922

Major wins
- Ribblesdale Stakes (1967); Coronation Cup (1969); Hardwicke Stakes (1969); K. George VI & Q. Elizabeth Stakes (1969); Prix Foy (1969); La Coupe (1970); Cumberland Lodge Stakes (1970)

Awards
- Timeform rating: 131
- Last updated on 19 February 2025

Park Top (May 1964 – 10 May 1989) was a top-class British-bred racehorse. She had an unfashionable pedigree, cost only 500 guineas as a yearling. Her grand-dam Oola Hills was the dam of the leading sprinter Pappa Fourway. Unlike him, Park Top was at her best over middle distances.

While she did not run as a two-year-old, her career tally of wins was 13 races worth £136,440. She was disappointing as a broodmare and her few foals had shown minimal talent before she was retired in 1979. Park Top was bred by Joan Scott of Buttermilk Stud Farm, South Newington, Oxfordshire.

== Racing career ==
=== 1966: two-year-old season ===
Being a late foal Park Top was backward as a two-year-old and also suffered from problems with her fetlock joints and later developed a cough. All of these were factors in the decision not to run her as a two-year-old.

=== 1967: three-year-old season ===
She began her career with an easy win in the Mar Lodge Place (for 3-y-o maidens) at Windsor. A second easy win, in the Twyford Stakes (3-y-o fillies) at Newbury, encouraged her owner to aim higher by tackling the Ribblesdale Stakes at Royal Ascot. Starting second favourite she won smoothly, defeating St Pauli Girl who had earlier finished second in The Oaks. Six weeks later she won the Brighton Cup (then a good handicap).

=== 1968: four-year-old season ===
Park Top won the Brighton Challenge Cup again and also took the Prix d'Hédouville at Longchamp.

=== 1969: five-year-old season ===
It was as a five-year-old that Park Top shone. That year she was often ridden by Lester Piggott, although he was unable to pilot her in the Hardwicke Stakes and the Eclipse Stakes, Geoff Lewis filling in. A victory at Longchamp in May was followed by a success in the Coronation Cup, Hardwicke Stakes and King George VI and Queen Elizabeth Stakes. She was beaten in the Eclipse Stakes by Wolver Hollow when her rider Geoff Lewis pulled her off the rail, allowing Piggott on Wolver Hollow to nip up the rail and go clear. When Park Top was extricated from a pocket she ran on strongly but was unable to reel in the winner. Piggott was reinstated as her rider when she easily won the King George at Ascot later in July 1969. In the Prix de l'Arc de Triomphe she was stuck behind a wall of horses and finished very fast to be second behind Levmoss. Piggott blamed himself for her defeat but her owner the Duke of Devonshire was more forgiving in the book he wrote about Park Top A Romance of the Turf.

=== 1970: six-year-old season ===
After a warm up win at Longchamp in May, Park Top was beaten into second when trying to win the Coronation Cup at Epsom for the second time. Jarred up by the firm ground at Epsom, she did not race again until the Cumberland Lodge stakes at Ascot in September. She won well but finished lame. Appearing to have made a full recovery from what was only temporary lameness, she returned to Longchamp for a seventh time. In her final race she could only finish third.

=== Breeding ===
Park Top was retired from breeding in 1980 and died in 1989.

== See also ==
- Pappa Fourway
