= Charlottown =

British-bred Thoroughbred racehorse

- Racing silks of Lady Zia Wernher
- Sire: Charlottesville
- Grandsire: Prince Chevalier
- Dam: Meld
- Damsire: Alycidon
- Sex: Stallion
- Foaled: 1963
- Country: Great Britain
- Colour: Bay
- Breeder: Someries Stud
- Owner: Lady Zia Wernher
- Trainer: Towser Gosden; Gordon Smyth
- Record: 11: 7-3-0

Major wins
- Solario Stakes (1965); Horris Hill Stakes (1965); Epsom Derby (1966); Oxfordshire Stakes (1966); John Porter Stakes (1967); Coronation Cup (1967)

Awards
- Timeform rating 127; British Horse of the Year (1966)

Charlottown (1963 – 1979) was a Thoroughbred racehorse and sire. In a career which lasted from 1965 until 1967 he ran ten times and won seven races. He is best known for winning the 1966 Derby.

== Background ==
Charlottown was bred in England by his owner, Lady Zia Wernher's Someries Stud at Newmarket, Suffolk. He was sent into training with John "Towser" Gosden at Lewes in Sussex. He was sired by the Prix du Jockey Club winner Charlottesville and was the fifth and best foal of the racemare Meld who won the Fillies' Triple Crown in 1955.

== Racing career ==
=== 1965: two-year-old season ===
Charlottown had a successful first season, being unbeaten in three starts. He won the Solario Stakes at Sandown by eight lengths, the Blackwood Stakes and the Horris Hill Stakes at Newbury. In the Free Handicap, an end of year ranking of the best two-year-olds he was rated five pounds below the top weight Young Emperor.

At the end of the 1966 season, Towser Gosden was forced to retire for health reasons and the training of Charlottown was taken over by Gordon Smyth.

=== 1966: three-year-old season ===
As a three-year-old in 1966 Charlottown's wins included the Derby and the Oxfordshire Stakes. Charlottown lost his unbeaten record on his three-year-old debut, when he finished second to Black Prince II in the Lingfield Derby Trial. There was some criticism of his jockey Ron Hutchinson's performance in the race, and the Derby ride on Charlottown was given to Scobie Breasley.

In the Derby at Epsom, Charlottown started 5/1 third choice in the betting behind Right Noble and Pretendre who started 9/2 joint favourites. The start of the race was delayed when Charlottown lost one of his racing plates and had to be re-shod by his farrier. In the race Charlottown was towards the rear of the field in the early stages before Breasley began to make progress along the rails. In the straight he moved through a gap on the inside to challenge for the lead inside the final furlong. He won the race by a neck from Pretendre, with the two colts finishing five lengths clear of the rest of the field. He became the first Lewes-trained horse to win the Derby since Waxy in 1793.

In the Irish Derby at the Curragh a month later, Charlottown finished strongly after being held up in the early stages but was beaten a length by Sodium, a talented but unpredictable colt who had finished fourth in the Derby. There was some criticism of Breasley, who rode Charlottown a long way back from the early pace, giving the colt a great deal of ground to make up. In August, Charlottown beat Sodium easily in the Oxfordshire Stakes at Newbury. On his final race of the year, Charlottown started favourite for the St Leger at Doncaster but was beaten a head by Sodium.

=== 1967: four-year-old season ===
Charlottown stayed in training as a four-year-old and won the John Porter Stakes at Newbury on his debut in April. At Epsom he defeated a field which included Sodium and the Prix du Jockey Club winner Nelcius in the Coronation Cup. In July, Charlottown was sent to France for the Grand Prix de Saint-Cloud. He ran poorly, finishing sixth of the eight runners behind Taneb. Charlottown never ran again and was retired to stud at the end of the season.

== Assessment ==
Charlottown was named British Horse of the Year by the Racecourse Association in 1966, gaining 176 of the 240 votes. By the time of his retirement, Charlottown's earnings of £78,000 made him Britain's leading money-earner, breaking the record set by Tulyar.

In their book A Century of Champions, John Randall and Tony Morris rated Charlottown as an “inferior” Derby winner.

== Stud record ==
Charlottown was not a success as a stallion in England. His influence is seen through his daughter Edinburgh, who was bred by the Ballymacoll Stud. She became the grand-dam of the Derby winner North Light, and the great grand-dam of the Two Thousand Guineas winner Golan. Charlottown was exported to Australia in 1976 and died there after a paddock accident in 1979.

== Pedigree ==
Pedigree of Charlottown (GB), bay stallion, 1963
Sire Charlottesville (GB) 1957	Prince Chevalier; 1943	Prince Rose	Rose Prince
Sire Charlottesville (GB) 1957	Prince Chevalier; 1943	Prince Rose	Indolence
Sire Charlottesville (GB) 1957	Prince Chevalier; 1943	Chevalerie	Abbot's Speed
Sire Charlottesville (GB) 1957	Prince Chevalier; 1943	Chevalerie	Kassala
Sire Charlottesville (GB) 1957	Noorani; 1950	Nearco	Pharos
Sire Charlottesville (GB) 1957	Noorani; 1950	Nearco	Nogara
Sire Charlottesville (GB) 1957	Noorani; 1950	Empire Glory	Singapore
Sire Charlottesville (GB) 1957	Noorani; 1950	Empire Glory	Skyglory
Dam Meld (GB) 1952	Alycidon; 1945	Donatello	Blenheim
Dam Meld (GB) 1952	Alycidon; 1945	Donatello	Delleana
Dam Meld (GB) 1952	Alycidon; 1945	Aurora	Hyperion
Dam Meld (GB) 1952	Alycidon; 1945	Aurora	Rose Red
Dam Meld (GB) 1952	Daily Double; 1943	Fair Trial	Fairway
Dam Meld (GB) 1952	Daily Double; 1943	Fair Trial	Lady Juror
Dam Meld (GB) 1952	Daily Double; 1943	Doubleton	Bahram
Dam Meld (GB) 1952	Daily Double; 1943	Doubleton	Double Life (Family: 2-i)
