= Billy Nevett =

English flat racing jockey (1906–1992)

Personal information
- Born: 26 May 1906 Chorlton-cum-Hardy, Manchester
- Died: 9 May 1992 (aged 85) Northallerton, North Yorkshire
- Occupation: Jockey

Horse racing career
- Sport: Horse racing

Major racing wins
- Major race wins: Oaks Stakes (1948); Derby Stakes (1941, 1944, 1945); Champion Stakes (1944); July Cup (1941); Middle Park Stakes (1944)

Significant horses
- Comatas, Dante, Hycilla, Masaka, Ocean Swell, Owen Tudor

William Nevett (26 May 1906 – 9 May 1992) was an English flat racing jockey, who won three wartime Derbies and formed a famous partnership with Dante, one of the horses of the century.

== Career ==
Nevett was born in Chorlton-cum-Hardy, Manchester and rode for three generations of the Peacock family - Dobson, Matthew and Richard.

His first winner was Stockwood at Carlisle in 1924 and by the 1930s, he had become the leading rider in the North of England, known as "Cock of the North". He was runner-up, to Gordon Richards, in the jockeys' championships of 1933 (73 winners), 1936 (108 winners), 1937 (110 winners) and 1938 (122 winners). During the war, he served as a private, but continued to ride, winning his 1000th race on Thixendale at Thirsk in 1940 and then three Derbies - on Owen Tudor for Fred Darling in 1941, Ocean Swell for Lord Rosebery and then, most famously, on Dante, for Matthew Peacock.

Dante was Nevett's most famous ride. He went unbeaten at two-years-old and when he reappeared for the first race of his three-year-old season in Stockton's Roseberry Stakes he won by four lengths at odds of 1/10. Nevett then called him "the finest horse I have ever ridden". He started the 2,000 Guineas as even money favourite of twenty but was beaten a neck by Court Martial. He was favourite for the Derby Stakes too (at 100/30) and won by two lengths from Midas, with Court Martial a head behind in third. This made Dante the first Northern horse to win the Derby since Pretender in 1869. He was again favourite for the St Leger but by then a degenerative eye condition had taken hold. He never ran again.

His only non wartime Classic came in the Oaks on Masaka in 1948. A late career success came in the 1952 Cesarewitch on Flush Royal. His final winner was in the final race of the 1956 season at Manchester. After retirement, he began training in Ripon without much success.

He lived in a Queen Anne house in Bedale and died in Northallerton in 1992. A handicap race is run in his name at Ripon Racecourse.

== Major wins ==
(United Kingdom) Great Britain

- Oaks Stakes – Masaka (1948)
- Derby Stakes – Owen Tudor (1941), Ocean Swell (1944), Dante (1945)
- July Cup – Comatas (1941)
- Middle Park Stakes – Dante (1944)
- Champion Stakes – Hycilla (1944)

== See also ==
- List of jockeys

== Bibliography ==
- Mortimer, Roger; Onslow, Richard; Willett, Peter (1978). Biographical Encyclopaedia of British Racing. London: Macdonald and Jane's. ISBN 0-354-08536-0.
- Tanner, Michael; Cranham, Gerry (1992). Great Jockeys of the Flat. Enfield, Middlesex: Guinness Publishing. ISBN 0-85112-989-7.
