= Bruce Hobbs =

British jockey (1920–2005)

Bruce Robertson Hobbs (27 December 1920 – 22 November 2005) was an English jockey and racehorse trainer.

Born on Long Island, New York, Hobbs became the youngest and tallest jockey to ride the winner of the English Grand National when successful on Battleship, a son of Man o' War, in 1938 just three months after his 17th birthday. Two weeks later, he won the Welsh Grand National on Timber Wolf. At the end of the 1937–38 season, during which he rode 35 winners, he became the first jockey to win three Grand Nationals in one year, lastly the Cedarhurst version.

== Riding career ==
Hobbs had started as an amateur, riding ten winners before his 16th birthday. It was said that of all the young riders in the history of racing, "none has created a greater stir than has young Hobbs". He had just turned professional when he had his first ride in the National in 1937. He had been due to ride Battleship, until that horse was withdrawn. In the event, he was booked to ride a horse called Flying Minutes and was amongst the leaders until falling at the last open ditch.

In 1938, he finally got to ride and win aboard Battleship, a horse that was completing a unique American and Aintree National double. A crashing fall later that year resulted in injuries including a broken spine. Although told he would never ride again, he returned to the saddle, but turned to training horses at age 25.

== Military service ==
Between 1940 and 1945 Hobbs served in the Queen's Own Yorkshire Dragoons. He reached the rank of Captain and was awarded the Military Cross.

== Training career ==
Shortly after the war, Hobbs became a private trainer for John Rogerson at Letcombe Regis in Berkshire. In 1953 he moved to Newmarket, Suffolk and became assistant trainer to Cecil Boyd-Rochfort. In 1961 and 1962 he was assistant to John Clayton. In 1964 he moved to the Carlburg stable near Newmarket and became private trainer to David Robinson. Hobbs became a public trainer in 1966, basing himself at the Palace House stable where he remained for the rest of his career.

== Retirement ==
Hobbs retired from racing in 1985. He died at Newmarket, Suffolk, in 2005, aged 84.
