= Jimmy Lindley =

English jockey and horse racing broadcaster (1935–2022)

James Frederick Lindley (16 May 1935 – 23 March 2022) was an English jockey who competed in flat racing. After retiring as a jockey he became a broadcaster.

During his career as a jockey, he won three Classic races: the 2,000 Guineas in 1963 and 1966 and the St Leger in 1964.

He retired from racing in 1974, after which he became the BBC's paddock expert during the flat season, commenting on horses as they paraded, as well as being a race analyst. He spent nearly 30 years in this role.

== Major wins ==
- Ascot Gold Cup - Precipice Wood (1970), Lassalle (1973)
- 2000 Guineas - Only For Life (1963), Kashmir (1966)
- Coronation Cup - Charlottown (1967)
- King George VI and Queen Elizabeth Stakes - Aggressor (1960)
- St James's Palace Stakes - Track Spare (1966), Sun Prince (1972)
- St Leger - Indiana (1964)
