= Towser Gosden =

British racehorse trainer

John Montague "Towser" Gosden (1904 – 20 October 1967) was a British racehorse trainer based near Lewes, East Sussex.

He won a number of important races, although his career was interrupted by the Second World War. He trained Epsom Derby winner Charlottown as a two-year-old, and won the King George VI and Queen Elizabeth Stakes with Aggressor.

He is the father of British racehorse trainer John Gosden.

== Personal life ==
He married Peggy Gosden (née Gearing), with whom he had two children, John and Sally.

== See also ==
- John Gosden
