= Gordon Richards Stakes =

Flat horse race in Britain

- Class: Group 3
- Location: Sandown Park; Esher, England
- Inaugurated: 1963
- Race type: Flat / Thoroughbred
- Sponsor: Bet365
- Website: Sandown Park

Race information
- Distance: 1m 1f 209y (2,002 m)
- Surface: Turf
- Track: Right-handed
- Qualification: Four-years-old and up
- Weight: 9 st 2 lb Allowances; 3 lb for fillies and mares Penalties; 7 lb for Group 1 winners * 5 lb for Group 2 winners * 3 lb for Group 3 winners * * since 31 August last year
- Purse: £85,000 (2025); 1st: £48,204

Gordon Richards Stakes
2026
Saddadd	King Of Cities	Almeric

Previous years
2025
Al Aasy	Ancient Wisdom	Almaqam
2024
Okeechobee	Desert Hero	Israr
2023
Adayar	Anmaat	Highland Avenue
2022
Mostahdaf	Foxes Tales	Juan Elcano
2021
Waldkonig	Desert Encounter	Extra Elusive

2020-2011
2019
Crystal Ocean	Knight To Behold	Extra Elusive
2018
Crystal Ocean	Fabricate	Morando
2017
Ulysses	Deauville	My Dream Boat
2016
My Dream Boat	Western Hymn	Ayrad
2015
Western Hymn	Postponed	Cannock Chase
2014
Noble Mission	Telescope	Contributer
2013
Al Kazeem	Thomas Chippendale	Ektihaam
2012
Colombian	Poet	Twice Over
2011
Kings Gambit	Black Spirit	Shamali

2010-2001
2010
Glass Harmonium	Redwood	Laaheb
2009
Tartan Bearer	Pipedreamer	Buccellati
2008
Ask	Hattan	Philatelist
2007
Red Rocks	Mashaahed	Kandidate
2006
Day Flight	Notable Guest	Crosspeace
2005
Weightless	Hazyview	Tolpuddle
2004
Chancellor	Nysaean	Sunstrach
2003
Indian Creek	Bourgainville	Imperial Dancer
2002
Chancellor	Border Arrow	Imperial Dancer
2001
Island House	Border Arrow	Pawn Broker

2000-1991
2000
Little Rock	Diamond White	Bomb Alaska
1999
Generous Rosi	Evening World	Dark Shell
1998
Germano	Garuda	Riyadian
1997
Sasuru	Multicoloured	Ali-Royal
1996
Singspiel	Pilsudski	Naked Welcome
1995
Prince of Andros	Nicolotte	Ionio
1994
Scribe	Prince of Andros	Wootton Rivers
1993
Ruby Tiger	Great Palm	Boloardo
1992
Dear Doctor	Red Bishop	Opera House
1991
Noble Patriarch	Stapleford Manor	Karinga Bay

1990-1988
1990
Dolpour	Ile De Chypre	Batshoof
1989
Indian Skimmer	Per Quod	Carroll House
1988
Infamy	Most Welcome	Golden Braid

The Gordon Richards Stakes is a Group 3 flat horse race in Great Britain open to horses aged four years or older. It is run over a distance of 1 mile, 1 furlong and 209 yards (2,002 metres) at Sandown Park in late April.

== History ==
The event was established in 1963, and it was originally called the Westbury Stakes. It was initially held in late May or early June.

The Westbury Stakes continued to be staged in May or June until 1973. That year's edition took place at Kempton Park. Its date was switched with that of the Brigadier Gerard Stakes in 1974, and from this point it was held in April.

The race was given its present title in 1987. It was renamed in memory of Sir Gordon Richards, a famous jockey who died the previous year.

The Gordon Richards Stakes is part of a two-day meeting which features both flat and jump races. Other events at the meeting include the Bet365 Gold Cup, the Celebration Chase, the Sandown Classic Trial and the Sandown Mile.

== Records ==
Most successful horse (2 wins):

- Chancellor – 2002, 2004
- Crystal Ocean - 2018, 2019

Leading jockey (6 wins):

- Ryan Moore – Ask (2008), Tartan Bearer (2009), Glass Harmonium (2010), Crystal Ocean (2018, 2019), Okeechobee (2024)

Leading trainer (10 wins):

- Sir Michael Stoute – Hard Fought (1981), Dolpour (1990), Singspiel (1996), Little Rock (2000), Ask (2008), Tartan Bearer (2009), Glass Harmonium (2010), Ulysses (2017), Crystal Ocean (2018, 2019)

== Winners ==
Year	Winner	Age	Jockey	Trainer	Time
1963	Miralgo	4	Bill Williamson	Harry Wragg	2:08.80
1964	Tacitus	5	Duncan Keith	Walter Nightingall	2:11.60
1965	Goupi	3	Geoff Lewis	Staff Ingham	2:13.40
1966	Super Sam	4	Brian Taylor	Jack Watts	2:08.00
1967	Chinwag	3	Sandy Barclay	Arthur Budgett	2:24.20
1968	Sidon	4	Lester Piggott	Sir Gordon Richards	2:17.00
1969	Remand	4	Joe Mercer	Dick Hern	2:16.00
1970	Connaught	5	Sandy Barclay	Noel Murless	2:09.40
1971	Arthur	4	Ron Hutchinson	John Dunlop	2:13.30
1972	Brigadier Gerard	4	Joe Mercer	Dick Hern	2:08.60
1973 (Note: The 1973 running took place at Kempton Park)	Scottish Rifle	4	Ron Hutchinson	John Dunlop	2:02.54
1974 (dh)	Funny Fellow; Tudor Rhythm	4; 4	Geoff Lewis; Pat Eddery	Harry Wragg; Peter Walwyn	2:15.62
1975	Never Return	4	Lester Piggott	Robert Armstrong	2:12.73
1976	Jolly Good	4	Geoff Lewis	Bruce Hobbs	2:07.08
1977	Lucky Wednesday	4	Joe Mercer	Henry Cecil	2:07.38
1978	Hot Grove	4	Willie Carson	Fulke Johnson Houghton	2:18.72
1979	Sexton Blake	4	Steve Cauthen	Barry Hills	2:20.83
1980	Gregorian	4	Lester Piggott	Vincent O'Brien	2:05.17
1981	Hard Fought	4	Walter Swinburn	Michael Stoute	2:11.58
1982	Princes Gate	5	Greville Starkey	Harry Thomson Jones	2:04.06
1983	Ivano	4	Lester Piggott	Henry Cecil	2:21.56
1984	Morcon	4	Willie Carson	Dick Hern	2:06.39
1985	Elegant Air	4	John Matthias	Ian Balding	2:07.83
1986	Supreme Leader	4	Philip Robinson	Clive Brittain	2:19.92
1987	Allez Milord	4	Greville Starkey	Guy Harwood	2:06.30
1988	Infamy	4	Ray Cochrane	Luca Cumani	2:14.33
1989	Indian Skimmer	5	Steve Cauthen	Henry Cecil	2:18.57
1990	Dolpour	4	Walter Swinburn	Michael Stoute	2:05.24
1991	Noble Patriarch	4	John Reid	John Dunlop	2:07.23
1992	Dear Doctor	5	Cash Asmussen	John Hammond	2:07.42
1993	Ruby Tiger	6	Richard Quinn	Paul Cole	2:12.60
1994	Scribe	4	Willie Carson	John Dunlop	2:21.92
1995	Prince of Andros	5	Jason Weaver	David Loder	2:09.69
1996	Singspiel	4	Frankie Dettori	Michael Stoute	2:06.68
1997	Sasuru	4	Michael Hills	Geoff Wragg	2:13.08
1998	Germano	5	Michael Hills	Geoff Wragg	2:21.22
1999	Generous Rosi	4	Richard Quinn	John Dunlop	2:13.03
2000	Little Rock	4	Kieren Fallon	Sir Michael Stoute	2:20.69
2001	Island House	5	Darryll Holland	Geoff Wragg	2:21.90
2002	Chancellor	4	Michael Hills	Barry Hills	2:12.77
2003	Indian Creek	5	Richard Quinn	David Elsworth	2:09.56
2004	Chancellor	6	Kieren Fallon	John Dunlop	2:11.19
2005	Weightless	5	Johnny Murtagh	Amanda Perrett	2:08.90
2006	Day Flight	5	Richard Hughes	John Gosden	2:08.17
2007	Red Rocks	4	Frankie Dettori	Brian Meehan	2:09.16
2008	Ask	5	Ryan Moore	Sir Michael Stoute	2:10.63
2009	Tartan Bearer	4	Ryan Moore	Sir Michael Stoute	2:08.65
2010	Glass Harmonium	4	Ryan Moore	Sir Michael Stoute	2:08.03
2011	Kings Gambit	7	Jamie Spencer	Tom Tate	2:08.01
2012	Colombian	4	William Buick	John Gosden	2:24.60
2013	Al Kazeem	5	James Doyle	Roger Charlton	2:10.18
2014	Noble Mission	5	James Doyle	Lady Cecil	2:15.89
2015	Western Hymn	4	Frankie Dettori	John Gosden	2:10.25
2016	My Dream Boat	4	Adam Kirby	Clive Cox	2:13.14
2017	Ulysses	4	Andrea Atzeni	Sir Michael Stoute	2:14.16
2018	Crystal Ocean	4	Ryan Moore	Sir Michael Stoute	2:11.48
2019	Crystal Ocean	5	Ryan Moore	Sir Michael Stoute	2:07.80
	no race 2020 (Note: The 2020 running was cancelled because of the COVID-19 pandemic in the United Kingdom)
2021	Waldkonig	4	Frankie Dettori	John and Thady Gosden	2:13.56
2022	Mostahdaf	4	Jim Crowley	John and Thady Gosden	2:12.59
2023 (Note: The 2023 running took place at Newmarket after the original Sandown Park fixture was abandoned)	Adayar	5	William Buick	Charlie Appleby	2:05.37
2024	Okeechobee	5	Ryan Moore	Harry Charlton	2:10.15
2025	Al Aasy	8	Jim Crowley	William Haggas	2:11.22
2026	Saddadd	4	Ray Dawson	Roger Varian	2:08.46

== See also ==
- Horse racing in Great Britain
- List of British flat horse races
