= Gordon Stakes =

Flat horse race in Britain

- Class: Group 3
- Location: Goodwood Racecourse; W. Sussex, England
- Inaugurated: 1902
- Race type: Flat / Thoroughbred
- Sponsor: HKJC World Pool
- Website: Goodwood

Race information
- Distance: 1m 3f 218y (2,412 metres)
- Surface: Turf
- Track: Right-handed
- Qualification: Three-year-olds
- Weight: 9 st 3 lb Allowances; 3 lb for fillies Penalties; 7 lb for Group 1 winners * 5 lb for Group 2 winners * 3 lb for Group 3 winners * * after 2024
- Purse: £200,000 (2025); 1st: £113,420

Gordon Stakes
2026
Enceladus	Geryon	Venetian Lace

Previous years
2025
Merchant	Wimbledon Hawkeye	Windlord
2024
Jan Brueghel	Bellum Justum	Sayedaty Sadaty
2023
Desert Hero	Chesspiece	Canberra Legend
2022
New London	Deauville Legend	Hoo Ya Mal
2021
Ottoman Emperor	Sir Lucan	Third Realm

2020-2011
2020
Mogul	Highland Chief	Subjectivist
2019
Nayef Road	Constantinople	Spanish Mission
2018
Cross Counter	Dee Ex Bee	Bombyx
2017
Crystal Ocean	Khalidi	Mount Moriah
2016
Ulysses	The Major General	Shogun
2015
Highland Reel	Scottish	Disegno
2014
Snow Sky	Windshear	Somewhat
2013
Cap O'Rushes	Excess Knowledge	Spillway
2012
Noble Mission	Encke	Michelangelo
2011
Namibian	Fiorente	Hunter's Light

2010-2001
2010
Rebel Soldier	Dandino	Arctic Cosmos
2009
Harbinger	Firebet	Urban Poet
2008
Conduit	Donegal	Hebridean
2007
Yellowstone	Aqaleem	Raincoat
2006
Sixties Icon	Jadalee	Linas Selection
2005
The Geezer	Unfurled	Brahminy Kite
2004
Maraahel	Go For Gold	Remaadd
2003
Phoenix Reach	High Accolade	Hawk Flyer
2002
Bandari	First Charter	Izdiham
2001
Alexius	Demophilos	Nayef

2000-1991
2000
Millenary	Air Marshall	Sobriety
1999
Compton Ace	Time Zone	Adnaan
1998
Nedawi	Rabah	Hitman
1997
Stowaway	Poseidon	Ivan Luis
1996
St Mawes	Chief Contender	Storm Trooper
1995
Presenting	Don Corleone	Istidaad
1994
Broadway Flyer	Suplizi	Party Season
1993
Right Win	Shareek	Beneficial
1992
Bonny Scot	Alflora	Beyton
1991
Stylish Senor	Trebly	Le Corsaire

1990-1982
1990
Karinga Bay	Starstreak	Blue Stag
1989
Warrshan	Alphabel	N C Owen
1988
Minster Son	Assatis	Alwuhush
1987
Love The Groom	Colchis	Naheez
1986
Allez Milord	Bonhomie	Sirk
1985
Kazaroun	Kamakura	Mac's Reef
1984
Commanche Run	Shernazar	Gold And Ivory
1983
John French	Good As Diamonds	Russian Roubles
1982
Electric	Touching Wood	Jalmood

The Gordon Stakes is a Group 3 flat horse race in Great Britain open to three-year-old horses. It is run at Goodwood over a distance of 1 mile 3 furlongs and 218 yards (2,412 metres), and it is scheduled to take place each year in late July or early August.

== History ==
The event is named after the Duke of Gordon, one of the dukedoms held by the Duke of Richmond, the owner of Goodwood Racecourse. It was established in 1902, and it was restricted to three-year-olds in 1903.

The Gordon Stakes can serve as a trial for the St. Leger Stakes, and ten horses have won both races. The first was Prince Palatine in 1911, and the latest was Jan Brueghel in 2024.

During the 1890s there was a 1 mile 2 furlong race open to three-year-olds and older called the Gordon Stakes that was run in late July or early August.

The race is currently held on the third day of the five-day Glorious Goodwood meeting.

== Records ==
Leading jockey (6 wins):

- Sir Gordon Richards – Tavern (1933), Magnet (1936), Nathoo (1948), Royal Forest (1949), Prince d'Ouilly (1951), Gay Time (1952)
- Willie Carson – Grey Thunder (1974), More Light (1979), Prince Bee (1980), Bustomi (1981), Love the Groom (1987), Minster Son (1988)
- Ryan Moore - Conduit (2008), Harbinger (2009), Rebel Soldier (2010), Crystal Ocean (2017), Mogul (2020), Jan Brueghel (2024)

Leading trainer (10 wins):

- Sir Michael Stoute – Electric (1982), Kazaroun (1985), Warrshan (1989), Alexius (2001), Maraahel (2004), Conduit (2008), Harbinger (2009), Snow Sky (2014), Ulysses (2016), Crystal Ocean (2017)

== Winners ==
Year	Winner	Jockey	Trainer	Time
1902	Osbech	William Halsey	Percy Peck	2:39.80
1903	Zinfandel	Mornington Cannon	Charles Beatty
1904	Delaunay	Willie Lane	Peter Gilpin
1905	Dinneford	J Rogers	T Doyle
1906	Victorious	Danny Maher	George Lambton
1907	Galvani	Bernard Dillon	Peter Gilpin
1908	Putchamin	Otto Madden	Richard Marsh
1909	Moscato	Charlie Trigg	Alec Taylor Jr.
1910	Cardinal Beaufort	Danny Maher	Captain Robert Dewhurst
1911	Prince Palatine	Steve Donoghue	Henry Beardsley
1912	Fantasio	Walter Earl	J Smith
1913	Augur	Walter Griggs	Peter Gilpin
1914	My Prince	Walter Griggs	Charlie Waugh
	no race 1915–18
1919	Sir Douglas	George Hulme	Atty Persse	2:41.20
1920	The Alder	Joe Childs	Alec Taylor Jr.
1921	Stanislaus	Steve Donoghue	George Lambton	2:46.40
1922	Tamar	Frank Bullock	Alec Taylor Jr.	2:44.00
1923	Bold and Bad	Frank Bullock	Alec Taylor Jr.	2:46.00
1924	Black Sheep	Frank Bullock	Alec Taylor Jr.	2:46.40
1925	Kentish Knock	Tommy Weston	George Lambton
1926	Thistledown (Note: Thistledown won the run-off after dead-heating with Pantera.)	Henri Jelliss	Basil Jarvis	2:44.80
1927	Tiger Hill	Henri Jelliss	Colledge Leader	2:45.00
1928	Cyclonic	Bobby Jones	Basil Jarvis	2:37.80
1929	Defoe	Freddie Fox	Fred Darling	2:39.00
1930 (dh)	Press Gang; Ut Majeur	Freddie Fox; Michael Beary	Fred Darling; Richard Dawson	2:41.40
1931	Rose en Soleil	Richard Peryyman	Dawson Waugh	2:49.40
1932	Firdaussi	Michael Beary	Frank Butters	2:52.00
1933	Tavern	Gordon Richards	Basil Jarvis	2:40.40
1934	Bright Bird	Bobby Dick	Joseph Lawson	2:40.20
1935	Bideford Bay	Eph Smith	Fred Sneyd	2:39.80
1936	Magnet	Gordon Richards	Fred Templeman	2:47.00
1937	Perifox	Rufus Beasley	Cecil Boyd-Rochfort	2:37.60
1938	Valedictory	Rufus Beasley	Cecil Boyd-Rochfort	2:38.80
1939	Wheatland	Tommy Burns Sr.	Richard Dawson	2:39.20
	no race 1940–45
1946	Fast and Fair	Cliff Richards	Joseph Lawson	2:42.80
1947	Merry Quip	Tommy Weston	Noel Cannon	2:41.20
1948	Nathoo	Gordon Richards	Frank Butters	2:41.80
1949	Royal Forest	Gordon Richards	Noel Murless	2:38.00
1950	Foxboro	Bill Rickaby	Victor Smyth	2:41.20
1951	Prince d'Ouilly	Gordon Richards	Dick Warden	2:54.20
1952	Gay Time	Gordon Richards	Walter Nightingall	2:52.80
1953	Prince Canarina	Doug Smith	Harvey Leader	2:44.60
1954	Brilliant Green	Eph Smith	Donald Watson	2:44.20
1955	Manati	Harry Carr	Cecil Boyd-Rochfort	2:36.40
1956	Dacian	Willie Snaith	Humphrey Cottrill	2:40.80
1957	Pipe Of Peace	Scobie Breasley	Gordon Richards	2:37.00
1958	Guersillus	Eddie Hide	Charles Elsey	2:41.00
1959	Above Suspicion	Doug Smith	Cecil Boyd-Rochfort	2:38.00
1960	Kipling	Geoff Lewis	Peter Hastings-Bass	2:43.40
1961	Pardao	Harry Carr	Cecil Boyd-Rochfort	2:51.00
1962	Gay Challenger	Ron Hutchinson	John Oxx Sr.	2:35.40
1963	Tiger	Scobie Breasley	Sir Gordon Richards	2:36.00
1964	Sweet Moss	Lester Piggott	Noel Murless	2:37.40
1965	King Log	Ron Hutchinson	George Todd	2:50.60
1966	Khalekan	Des Lake	Paddy Prendergast	2:40.00
1967	Sun Rock	George Moore	Noel Murless	2:43.60
1968	Mount Athos	Ron Hutchinson	John Dunlop	2:41.60
1969	Harmony Hall	Bill Williamson	Gordon Smyth	2:38.00
1970	Rock Roi	Geoff Lewis	Peter Walwyn	2:37.70
1971	Athens Wood	Greville Starkey	Harry Thomson Jones	2:47.38
1972	Scottish Rifle	Ron Hutchinson	John Dunlop	2:43.98
1973	Duke Of Ragusa	John Gorton	Bruce Hobbs	2:37.06
1974	Grey Thunder	Willie Carson	Clive Brittain	2:37.22
1975	Guillaume Tell	Lester Piggott	Vincent O'Brien	2:36.06
1976	Smuggler	Joe Mercer	Dick Hern	2:38.23
1977	Pollerton	Christy Roche	Paddy Prendergast	2:37.27
1978	Sexton Blake	Eddie Hide	Barry Hills	2:36.38
1979	More Light	Willie Carson	Dick Hern	2:38.40
1980	Prince Bee	Willie Carson	Dick Hern	2:38.14
1981	Bustomi	Willie Carson	Dick Hern	2:35.00
1982	Electric	Greville Starkey	Michael Stoute	2:36.37
1983	John French	Lester Piggott	Henry Cecil	2:35.53
1984	Commanche Run	Lester Piggott	Luca Cumani	2:32.79
1985	Kazaroun	Walter Swinburn	Michael Stoute	2:39.60
1986	Allez Milord	Greville Starkey	Guy Harwood	2:35.09
1987	Love the Groom	Willie Carson	John Dunlop	2:33.90
1988	Minster Son	Willie Carson	Dick Hern	2:40.54
1989	Warrshan	Walter Swinburn	Michael Stoute	2:35.06
1990	Karinga Bay	Brian Rouse	Denys Smith	2:32.42
1991	Stylish Senor	George Duffield	James Fanshawe	2:41.62
1992	Bonny Scot	Frankie Dettori	Luca Cumani	2:37.21
1993	Right Win	John Reid	Richard Hannon Sr.	2:42.26
1994	Broadway Flyer	Michael Hills	John Hills	2:35.32
1995	Presenting	Frankie Dettori	John Gosden	2:31.57
1996	St Mawes	Kevin Darley	John Dunlop	2:35.18
1997	Stowaway	Kevin Darley	Saeed bin Suroor	2:33.98
1998 (dh)	Nedawi; Rabah	Frankie Dettori; Richard Hills	Saeed bin Suroor; John Dunlop	2:37.54
1999	Compton Ace	Kieren Fallon	Gerard Butler	2:34.17
2000	Millenary	Richard Quinn	John Dunlop	2:35.42
2001	Alexius	Kieren Fallon	Sir Michael Stoute	2:33.13
2002	Bandari	Willie Supple	Mark Johnston	2:34.26
2003	Phoenix Reach	Darryll Holland	Andrew Balding	2:36.53
2004	Maraahel	Richard Hills	Sir Michael Stoute	2:36.01
2005	The Geezer	Richard Quinn	David Elsworth	2:38.83
2006	Sixties Icon	Frankie Dettori	Jeremy Noseda	2:36.85
2007	Yellowstone	Johnny Murtagh	Aidan O'Brien	2:40.69
2008	Conduit	Ryan Moore	Sir Michael Stoute	2:37.14
2009	Harbinger	Ryan Moore	Sir Michael Stoute	2:39.98
2010	Rebel Soldier	Ryan Moore	Jeremy Noseda	2:35.04
2011	Namibian	Silvestre de Sousa	Mark Johnston	2:39.55
2012	Noble Mission	Tom Queally	Sir Henry Cecil	2:37.02
2013	Cap O'Rushes	Mickael Barzalona	Charlie Appleby	2:39.13
2014	Snow Sky	James Doyle	Sir Michael Stoute	2:33.08
2015	Highland Reel	Joseph O'Brien	Aidan O'Brien	2:34.94
2016	Ulysses	Andrea Atzeni	Sir Michael Stoute	2:38.37
2017	Crystal Ocean	Ryan Moore	Sir Michael Stoute	2:42.94
2018	Cross Counter	William Buick	Charlie Appleby	2:31.39
2019	Nayef Road	Silvestre de Sousa	Mark Johnston	2:35.67
2020	Mogul	Ryan Moore	Aidan O'Brien	2:34.89
2021	Ottoman Emperor	Ben Coen	Johnny Murtagh	2:40.21
2022	New London	William Buick	Charlie Appleby	2:33.80
2023	Desert Hero	Tom Marquand	William Haggas	2:43.86
2024	Jan Brueghel	Ryan Moore	Aidan O'Brien	2:34.76
2025 (Note: Flag start in the 2025 race due to lightning in the start area)	Merchant	Tom Marquand	William Haggas	2:37.88
2026	Enceladus	Dylan Browne McMonagle	Joseph O'Brien	2:35.25

== See also ==
- Horse racing in Great Britain
- List of British flat horse races
