= Moulton (horse) =

British-bred Thoroughbred racehorse

- Sire: Pardao
- Grandsire: Pardal
- Dam: Close Up
- Damsire: Nearula
- Sex: Stallion
- Foaled: 23 April 1969
- Country: United Kingdom
- Colour: Bay
- Breeder: White Lodge Stud
- Owner: R. B "Budgie" Moller
- Trainer: Harry Wragg
- Record: 15: 6-4-1

Major wins
- White Rose Stakes (1972); Prix Ridgway (1972); Prix Henri Delamarre (1972); Premio Presidente della Repubblica (1973); Benson and Hedges Gold Cup (1973)

Awards
- Timeform rating 121 (1972), 128 (1973)

Moulton (23 April 1969 – 1981) was a British Thoroughbred racehorse and sire. After finishing unplaced on his only start as a juvenile, Moulton improved to become a high-class middle-distance performer in 1972, winning the White Rose Stakes, Prix Ridgway and Prix Henri Delamarre as well as placing second in the Dante Stakes and the Prix du Prince d'Orange. He reached his peak as a four-year-old in 1973 when he won the Premio Presidente della Repubblica and finished second in the Eclipse Stakes before recording a 14/1 upset win in the Benson and Hedges Gold Cup. He was retired from racing and had limited success as a breeding stallion.

== Background ==
Moulton was a "big, strong, most attractive" bay horse with a white blaze and a white sock on his right hind foot bred by his owner Ralph "Budgie" Moller at his White Lodge Stud. Moller sent the colt to be trained in Newmarket by Harry Wragg at his Abington Place stable.

He was one of the best horses sired by Pardao who was a top-class middle-distance performer on both sides of the Atlantic, finishing third in The Derby and winning the San Juan Capistrano Handicap. He returned to stand at stud in England at the end of his racing career and sired several other good winners including the filly Sovereign whose wins included the Coronation Stakes. Moulton's dam Close Up was a winning daughter of Horama, an Irish broodmare who has been the ancestor of numerous major winners including Teenoso, Sir Percy, Rule of Law and Harayir.

== Racing career ==
=== 1971: two-year-old season ===
Moulton was slow to mature and made no impact as a two-year-old, finishing sixth on his only appearance.

=== 1972: three-year-old season ===
On his first appearance of 1972, Moulton recorded his first win as he won the Meldon Stakes, a maiden race over nine furlongs at Newcastle Racecourse in April before being moved up in class and distance for the White Rose Stakes over ten furlongs at Ascot Racecourse. Ridden by Brian Taylor he held off a strong late challenge from the Bruce Hobbs-trained Paper Cap to win by a short head. On his next appearance the colt contested the Dante Stakes (a major trial race for The Derby) over ten and a half furlongs at York Racecourse in May. He was beaten half a length by Rheingold with a gap of five lengths back to Coup de Feu in third. In the 193rd running of the Derby Mouton ran prominently for a long way before finishing ninth of the twenty-two runners behind Roberto.

In the late summer and autumn of 1972 Moulton was campaigned in France. On 27 August he was sent to Deauville Racecourse and started the 1.8/1 favourite for the Prix Ridgway over 1950 metres. Ridden by Lester Piggott he came out best in a close finish beating Mister Sic Top (winner of the 1971 Prix d'Ispahan) by a short head with Coup de Feu a short head away in third. In the Prix du Prince d'Orange at Longchamp Racecourse in September Moulton was badly hampered in the closing stages before finishing third to Sharapour and Mister Sic Top and was promoted to second after the winner was disqualified. Moulton was equipped with blinkers in the Prix Henri Delamarre over 2200 metres at Longchamp and won by two and a half lengths from Christmas Box.

=== 1973: four-year-old season ===
On his first appearance of 1973, Moulton finished unplaced behind Scottish Rifle in the Earl of Sefton Stakes at Newmarket in April. At the end of the month he finished a close-up ninth behind Rheingold in the Prix Ganay at Longchamp. Moulton was then sent to Italy for the Premio Presidente della Repubblica over 2400 metres in Rome on 27 May in which his opponents included Hoche (winner of the race in 1972), Orsa Maggiore (Oaks d'Italia) and Fernet (Premio Parioli). Ridden by Piggott he started favourite and won easily by two and a half lengths from Ferramonti. On his next appearance he finished third to La Troublerie and Some Crack in the Prix d'Ispahan at Longchanp on 24 June.

Following his campaign on continental Europe, Moulton returned to Britain to contest the Eclipse Stakes, which was run that year at Kempton Park Racecourse as a new grandstand at Sandown was being built. He sweated up badly before the race and caused considerable trouble in running. After launching his challenge up the centre of the course in the straight he veered right towards the inside rail, hampering Sharp Edge (winner of the Irish 2,000 Guineas) and Toujours Pret (Prix d'Harcourt). He finished second to Scottish Rifle, with Sun Prince a head away in third place but appeared fortunate to avoid disqualification. At York Racecourse in August Moulton started a 14/1 outsider for the second running of the Benson and Hedges Gold Cup. Scottish Rifle, Toujours Pret and Sun Prince were again in opposition but Rheingold was made the odds-on favourite. The 1972 winner Roberto was withdrawn shortly before the race and his scheduled jockey Lester Piggott opted to take the ride on Rheingold, going back on an informal agreement to ride Moulton if he became available. The ride on Moulton therefore went to the Welsh jockey Geoff Lewis. As the confusion over the riding arrangements reached a peak in the early afternoon Harry Wragg reportedly said to his son Geoff "I'm going to lunch. I'll leave it to you". After being several lengths behind the leaders on the turn into the straight, Moulton made steady progress along the inside rail before being switched right to make his challenge in the last quarter mile. He accelerated through a narrow gap to overtake Scottish Rifle a furlong out drew away to win by two and a half lengths with Rheingold four lengths back in third.

On his final appearance Moulton contested the Champion Stakes at Newmarket in October. After being restrained in the early stages, he made steady progress in the last half mile, but began to struggle in the closing stages and finished fourth behind Hurry Harriet, Allez France and Sharp Edge.

== Assessment ==
In the official British Free Handicap for three-year-olds of 1972 Moulton was rated the eleventh-best three-year-old colt of the year, ten pounds behind the top-rated Deep Diver. The independent Timeform organisation gave him a rating of 121, thirteen pounds behind their best three-year-olds Deep Diver and Sallust. In their annual "Racehorses of 1972" Timeform described him as "a grand stamp of an animal", with a "good turn of foot". In 1973 Moulton was rated 128 by Timeform, nine pounds behind their Horse of the Year Rheingold, a horse he had beaten by more than six lengths at York.

== Stud record ==
Moulton was retired from racing to become a breeding stallion at the Lanwades Stud in Newmarket at an initial fee of £1,500. The best of his offspring included John de Coombe (Prix de la Salamandre), Stone (Premio Presidente della Repubblica, Gran Premio del Jockey Club), Hot Touch (Dante Stakes), Insular (Imperial Cup) and Good Lassie (dam of the Prix Marcel Boussac winner Ashayer). He died in 1981.

== Pedigree ==
Pedigree of Moulton (GB), bay stallion, 1969
Sire Pardao (GB) 1958	Pardal (FR); 1947	Pharis	Pharos
Sire Pardao (GB) 1958	Pardal (FR); 1947	Pharis	Carissima
Sire Pardao (GB) 1958	Pardal (FR); 1947	Adargatis	Asterus
Sire Pardao (GB) 1958	Pardal (FR); 1947	Adargatis	Helen de Troie
Sire Pardao (GB) 1958	Three Weeks (GB); 1946	Big Game	Bahram
Sire Pardao (GB) 1958	Three Weeks (GB); 1946	Big Game	Myrobella
Sire Pardao (GB) 1958	Three Weeks (GB); 1946	Eleanor Cross	Hyperion
Sire Pardao (GB) 1958	Three Weeks (GB); 1946	Eleanor Cross	Queen Christina
Dam Close Up (GB) 1958	Nearula (GB); 1950	Nasrullah	Nearco
Dam Close Up (GB) 1958	Nearula (GB); 1950	Nasrullah	Mumtaz Begum
Dam Close Up (GB) 1958	Nearula (GB); 1950	Respite	Flag of Truce
Dam Close Up (GB) 1958	Nearula (GB); 1950	Respite	Orama
Dam Close Up (GB) 1958	Horama (IRE); 1943	Panorama	Sir Cosmo
Dam Close Up (GB) 1958	Horama (IRE); 1943	Panorama	Happy Climax
Dam Close Up (GB) 1958	Horama (IRE); 1943	Lady of Aran	Orpen
Dam Close Up (GB) 1958	Horama (IRE); 1943	Lady of Aran	Queen of the Nore (Family 3-c)
