= White Rose Stakes =

- Class: Conditions
- Location: Ascot Racecourse; Ascot, England
- Final run: 28 April 1993
- Race type: Flat / Thoroughbred
- Website: Ascot

Race information
- Distance: 1m 2f (2,012 metres)
- Surface: Turf
- Track: Right-handed
- Qualification: Three-year-olds

The White Rose Stakes was a flat horse race in Great Britain open to three-year-old horses. It was run at Ascot over a distance of 1 mile and 2 furlongs (2,012 metres), and it was scheduled to take place each year in April or May.

== History ==
The event was originally held at Hurst Park. For a period it was open to horses aged three or older, and contested over 1 mile, 7 furlongs and 65 yards.

The White Rose Stakes was restricted to three-year-olds and cut to 1 mile and 2 furlongs in the early 1950s. It was transferred to Ascot in 1963. The present system of race grading was introduced in 1971, and the event was classed at Group 3 level.

The race continued with Group 3 status until the early 1980s. It was subsequently downgraded, and was last run in 1993. It was replaced by an open-age handicap, the White Rose Handicap, in 1994.

== Records ==
Leading jockey (5 wins):

- Lester Piggott – Samothraki (1962), Right Noble (1966), Light Fire (1969), Only a Wish (1970), Dukedom (1980)
- Willie Carson – Tierra Fuego (1976), Tully (1977), Milford (1979), Cut Above (1981), Alwuhush (1988)
- Steve Cauthen – Kirmann (1984), Vertige (1985), Mashkour (1986), Zalazl (1989), Perpendicular (1991)

Leading trainer (5 wins):

- Cecil Boyd-Rochfort – Black Tarquin (1949), Hilltop (1952), Hypera (1954), Parthia (1959), Great Society (1967)

== Winners ==
Year	Winner	Jockey	Trainer
1938	Legend Of France	Albert Richardson	Herbert Blagrave
1939	Hunter's Moon IV (Note: Tricameron finished first in 1939, but was disqualified following an objection for rough riding.)	Eph Smith	Frank Carter
1940-45	no race
1946	Marsyas II	Charlie Elliott	Charles Semblat
1947	Chanteur	R Brethes	Henry Count
1948	Migoli	Sir Gordon Richards	Frank Butters
1949	Black Tarquin	Edgar Britt	Cecil Boyd-Rochfort
1950	Supertello	Doug Smith	J C Waugh
1951	Colonist II	Tommy Gosling	Walter Nightingall
1952	Hilltop	Harry Carr	Cecil Boyd-Rochfort
1953	Ambiguity	Joe Mercer	Jack Colling
1954	Hypera	Stan Smith	Cecil Boyd-Rochfort
1955	Marwari	Eddie Cracknell	Walter Nightingall
1956	Esperanza	Scobie Breasley	William Smyth
1957	Heswall Honey	Brian Swift	Richard Thrale
1958	Crystal Bay	Harry Carr	Derrick Candy
1959	Parthia	Harry Carr	Cecil Boyd-Rochfort
1960	Tudor Period	Bill Rickaby	William Smyth
1961	Scatter	Joe Mercer	Jack Colling
1962	Samothraki	Lester Piggott	Freddie Maxwell
1963	Fern	Harry Carr	J Rogers
1964	Beaufront	Doug Smith	Jack Watts
1965	I Say	Duncan Keith	Walter Nightingall
1966	Right Noble	Lester Piggott	Vincent O'Brien
1967	Great Society	George Moore	Cecil Boyd-Rochfort
1968	Torpid	Greville Starkey	John Oxley
1969	Light Fire	Lester Piggott	Peter Nelson
1970	Only a Wish	Lester Piggott	Jeremy Tree
1971	Juggernaut	Brian Taylor	Freddie Maxwell
1972	Moulton	Brian Taylor	Harry Wragg
1973	Tepukei	Joe Mercer	Dick Hern
1974	English Prince	Pat Eddery	Peter Walwyn
1975	Jolly Good	Geoff Lewis	Bruce Hobbs
1976	Tierra Fuego	Willie Carson	Clive Brittain
1977 (Note: The 1977 running took place at Newbury)	Tully	Willie Carson	Dick Hern
1978	Leonardo da Vinci	Pat Eddery	Peter Walwyn
1979	Milford	Willie Carson	Dick Hern
1980	Dukedom	Lester Piggott	Ian Balding
1981	Cut Above	Willie Carson	Dick Hern
1982	Electric	Walter Swinburn	Michael Stoute
1983	Abandoned due to waterlogging
1984	Kirmann	Steve Cauthen	Fulke Johnson Houghton
1985	Vertige	Steve Cauthen	Henry Cecil
1986	Mashkour	Steve Cauthen	Henry Cecil
1987	Zaizoom	Richard Quinn	Paul Cole
1988	Alwuhush	Willie Carson	John Dunlop
1989	Zalazl	Steve Cauthen	Henry Cecil
1990	Starstreak	Richard Quinn	Mark Johnston
1991	Perpendicular	Steve Cauthen	Henry Cecil
1992	Top Register	Walter Swinburn	Lord Huntingdon
1993	Tioman Island	Richard Quinn	Paul Cole

== See also ==
- Horse racing in Great Britain
- List of British flat horse races
