= Cocked Hat Stakes =

Flat horse race in Britain

- Class: Listed
- Location: Goodwood Racecourse; W. Sussex, England
- Inaugurated: 1970
- Race type: Flat / Thoroughbred
- Sponsor: William Hill
- Website: Goodwood

Race information
- Distance: 1m 3f 44y (2,253 metres)
- Surface: Turf
- Track: Right-handed
- Qualification: Three-year-old colts and geldings
- Weight: 9 st 2 lb Penalties; 5 lb for Group winners* 3 lb for Listed winners* *after 31 August 2023
- Purse: £60,000 (2024); 1st: £34,026

Cocked Hat Stakes
2026
| Golden Story | Del Maro | Saxon Street |

Previous years
2025
Amiloc | Sir Dinadan | Tycoon
2024
Meydaan | Space Legend | Royal Power
2023
Gregory | Klondike | Hadrianus
2022
Lionel | Aldous Huxley | Lysander
2021
Lone Eagle | Yibir | Gentleman Joe

2020-2011
2020
Khalifa Sat | Emissary | Celestran
2019
Private Secretary | Spanish Mission | Fifth Position
2018
Aspetar | Main Street | Highbrow
2017
Khalidi | Fierce Impact | Raheen House
2016
Algometer | Prize Money | Ormito
2015
Storm The Stars | Best Of Times | Medrano
2014
Observational | Marzocco | Signposted
2013
[[ | | 92px]]
Disclaimer | Contributor | Only 2 Ran
2012
Michelangelo | Expense Claim | Perennial
2011
Masked Marvel | Namibian | Picture Editor

2010-2001
2010
Rewilding | Prizefighting | Very Good Day
2009
Alwaary | Beauchamp Xerxes | Sight Unseen
2008
City Leader | Scintillo | Top Lock
2007
Halicarnassus | Eastern Anthem | Broghill
2006
Championship Point | Sienna Storm | Senor Dali
2005
Unfurled | Indigo Cat | Belenus
2004
Manyana | Crocodile Dundee | Red Lancer
2003
High Accolade | Unigold | Westmoreland Road
2002
Coshocton | Dubai Destination | Frankies Dream
2001
Asian Heights | Wareed | Snowstorm

2000-1991
2000
Roscius | St Expedit | Bogus Dreams
1999
Dubai Millennium | Red Sea | Clodion
1998
Rabah | Mutamam | Pegnitz
1997
Grapeshot | Running Stag | Shii-Take
1996
Don Micheletto | Prize Giving | St Mawes
1995
Pentire | Istidaad | Fahal
1994
Opera Score | King Of Naples | Star Selection
1993
Geisway | Beneficial | Visto Si Stampi
1992
Jeune | Hatta's Mill | Beldi
1991
Man From Eldorado | Luchiroverte | Selkirk

1990-1987
1990
Razeen | Elmaamul | Silca An' Key
1989
Warrshan | Greenwich Papillon | Really Brilliant
1988
Minster Son | Sheriff's Star | Al Mufti
1987
Ibn Bey | Alwasmi | Classic Tale

The Cocked Hat Stakes is a Listed flat horse race in Great Britain open to three-year-old colts and geldings. It is run at Goodwood over a distance of 1 mile 3 furlongs and 44 yards (2,253 metres), and it is scheduled to take place each year in May.

== History ==
The event was established in 1970, and it was originally called the Predominate Stakes, although developed from a similar race called the Levin Down Stakes run up to 1969. It was named after Predominate, a three-time winner of the Goodwood Stakes from 1958 to 1960, and the winner of the Goodwood Cup in 1961.

For a period the Predominate Stakes was contested over 1 mile and 4 furlongs. It was cut to 1 mile, 1 furlong and 192 yards in 1988. A new distance of 1 mile and 3 furlongs was introduced in 2001.

The event was renamed the Cocked Hat Stakes in 2007. Its title recalls a light-hearted race staged at Goodwood in the 19th century, in which each rider had to wear a military hat.

The race sometimes serves as a trial for the Epsom Derby. The only horse to have won both events is Troy in 1979.

== Records ==
Leading jockey (5 wins):

- Willie Carson – English Harbour (1978), Troy (1979), Prince Bee (1980), Morcon (1983), Minster Son (1988)
- Frankie Dettori - Dubai Millennium (1999), Roscius (2000), Rewilding (2010), Khalidi (2017), Private Secretary (2019)

Leading trainer (6 wins):

- Dick Hern – Charlton (1970), Buoy (1973), Troy (1979), Prince Bee (1980), Morcon (1983), Minster Son (1988)
- Sir Henry Cecil - General Ironside (1976), Royal Blend (1977), Lanfranco (1985), Razeen (1990), Opera Score (1994), Disclaimer (2013)

== Winners ==
| Year | Winner | Jockey | Trainer | Time |
|---|---|---|---|---|
| 1970 | Charlton | Joe Mercer | Dick Hern | 2:39.40 |
| 1971 | Levanter | Lester Piggott | Ryan Price | 2:37.69 |
| 1972 | Scottish Rifle | Ron Hutchinson | John Dunlop | 2:43.97 |
| 1973 | Buoy | Joe Mercer | Dick Hern | 2:38.34 |
| 1974 | English Prince | Pat Eddery | Peter Walwyn | 2:36.61 |
| 1975 | No Alimony | Pat Eddery | Peter Walwyn | 2:09.61 |
| 1976 | General Ironside | Lester Piggott | Henry Cecil | 2:41.01 |
| 1977 | Royal Blend | Joe Mercer | Henry Cecil | 2:37.63 |
| 1978 | English Harbour | Willie Carson | Ian Balding | 2:35.56 |
| 1979 | Troy | Willie Carson | Dick Hern | 2:50.07 |
| 1980 (Note: The 1980 running took place at Kempton Park) | Prince Bee | Willie Carson | Dick Hern | 2:34.29 |
| 1981 | Abandoned due to waterlogging |
| 1982 | Peacetime | Joe Mercer | Jeremy Tree | 2:38.03 |
| 1983 | Morcon | Willie Carson | Dick Hern | 2:51.34 |
| 1984 | Ilium | Tony Murray | Harry Thomson Jones | 2:38.74 |
| 1985 | Lanfranco | Steve Cauthen | Henry Cecil | 2:36.13 |
| 1986 | Allez Milord | Greville Starkey | Guy Harwood | 2:53.68 |
| 1987 | Ibn Bey | Richard Quinn | Paul Cole | 2:34.76 |
| 1988 | Minster Son | Willie Carson | Dick Hern | 2:07.65 |
| 1989 | Warrshan | Walter Swinburn | Michael Stoute | 2:06.95 |
| 1990 | Razeen | Steve Cauthen | Henry Cecil | 2:09.88 |
| 1991 | Man from Eldorado | Ray Cochrane | Guy Harwood | 2:07.98 |
| 1992 | Jeune | Michael Hills | Geoff Wragg | 2:08.45 |
| 1993 | Geisway | Lester Piggott | Richard Hannon Sr. | 2:13.28 |
| 1994 | Opera Score | Pat Eddery | Henry Cecil | 2:20.02 |
| 1995 | Pentire | Michael Hills | Geoff Wragg | 2:05.83 |
| 1996 | Don Micheletto | Michael Kinane | Saeed bin Suroor | 2:10.81 |
| 1997 | Grapeshot | John Reid | Luca Cumani | 2:12.70 |
| 1998 | Rabah | Pat Eddery | John Dunlop | 2:08.31 |
| 1999 | Dubai Millennium | Frankie Dettori | Saeed bin Suroor | 2:07.54 |
| 2000 | Roscius | Frankie Dettori | Saeed bin Suroor | 2:10.27 |
| 2001 | Asian Heights | Kieren Fallon | Geoff Wragg | 2:23.00 |
| 2002 | Coshocton | Philip Robinson | Michael Jarvis | 2:25.51 |
| 2003 | High Accolade | Martin Dwyer | Marcus Tregoning | 2:25.61 |
| 2004 | Manyana | Martin Dwyer | Marcus Tregoning | 2:28.01 |
| 2005 | Unfurled | Richard Quinn | John Dunlop | 2:26.17 |
| 2006 | Championship Point | Ted Durcan | Mick Channon | 2:26.78 |
| 2007 | Halicarnassus | Darryll Holland | Mick Channon | 2:29.88 |
| 2008 | City Leader | Jamie Spencer | Brian Meehan | 2:26.48 |
| 2009 | Alwaary | Richard Hills | John Gosden | 2:27.98 |
| 2010 | Rewilding | Frankie Dettori | Mahmood Al Zarooni | 2:24.93 |
| 2011 | Masked Marvel | William Buick | John Gosden | 2:25.55 |
| 2012 | Michelangelo | William Buick | John Gosden | 2:24.61 |
| 2013 | Disclaimer | Tom Queally | Sir Henry Cecil | 2:30.47 |
| 2014 | Observational | James Doyle | Roger Charlton | 2:35.20 |
| 2015 | Storm The Stars | Pat Cosgrave | William Haggas | 2:24.36 |
| 2016 | Algometer | Jim Crowley | David Simcock | 2:33.74 |
| 2017 | Khalidi | Frankie Dettori | John Gosden | 2:22.77 |
| 2018 | Aspetar | Kieran Shoemark | Roger Charlton | 2:29.25 |
| 2019 | Private Secretary | Frankie Dettori | John Gosden | 2:24.11 |
| 2020 (Note: The 2020 race was run in June due to the COVID-19 pandemic in the United Kingdom) | Khalifa Sat | Tom Marquand | Andrew Balding | 2:26.52 |
| 2021 | Lone Eagle | Silvestre de Sousa | Martyn Meade | 2:35.54 |
| 2022 | Lionel | Jamie Spencer | David Menuisier | 2:33.34 |
| 2023 | Gregory | Robert Havlin | John and Thady Gosden | 2:23.43 |
| 2024 | Meydaan | Harry Davies | Simon & Ed Crisford | 2:25.06 |
| 2025 | Amiloc | Richard Kingscote | Ralph Beckett | 2:24.83 |
| 2026 | Golden Story | Pierre-Louis Jamin | Karl Burke | 2:28.26 |

== See also ==
- Horse racing in Great Britain
- List of British flat horse races
- Recurring sporting events established in 1970 – this race is included under its original title, Predominate Stakes.
