= Ambiguity (horse) =

British-bred Thoroughbred racehorse

- Sire: Big Game
- Grandsire: Bahram
- Dam: Amber Flash
- Damsire: Precipitation
- Sex: Mare
- Foaled: 1950
- Country: United Kingdom
- Colour: Bay
- Breeder: Astor Studs
- Owner: William Astor, 3rd Viscount Astor
- Trainer: Jack Colling
- Record: 11: 3-2-1

Major wins
- White Rose Stakes (1953); Epsom Oaks (1953); Jockey Club Cup (1953)

Awards
- £19,888

Ambiguity (1950 – after 1971) was a British Thoroughbred racehorse and broodmare best known for winning the 1953 Epsom Oaks. After finishing unplaced on her only start as a two-year-old she improved to become a top-class stayer in 1953. She won the White Rose Stakes, Oaks Stakes and Jockey Club Cup as well as finishing second in the Cheshire Oaks and the Oxfordshire Stakes. After her retirement from racing she had some success as a broodmare.

== Background ==
Ambiguity was a bay mare with a white face and four white socks bred in England by her owner William Astor, 3rd Viscount Astor. An unusual feature of her appearance, apart from her extensive white markings, was that her left eye was pale blue in colour. The filly was sent into training with Robert John "Jack" Colling at West Ilsley in Berkshire.

She was from the seventh crop of foals sired by Big Game the best British colt of his generation, whose wins included the 2000 Guineas and the Champion Stakes. As a breeding stallion, his other progeny included Combat and the 1000 Guineas winner Queenpot. Ambiguity's dam Amber Flash was a high-class stayer who defeated Chamossaire in the 1945 Jockey Club Cup and was a daughter of Traffic Light, an even better racemare whose wins included the Coronation Stakes and the Park Hill Stakes. Traffic Light's dam Point Duty (foaled 1926) was an influential broodmare whose other descendants have included Mannamead, Sodium, Madelia, Black Caviar and Solow.

== Racing career ==
=== 1952: two-year-old season ===
Ambiguity was slow to mature as a juvenile and ran unplaced on her only start.

=== 1953: three-year-old season ===
On her three-year-old debut, Ambiguity finished fourth in a race at Kempton Park Racecourse and was then stepped up in class and distance for the Cheshire Oaks over one and a half miles at Chester Racecourse in May. She showed much improved form and finished second, beaten a head by Brolly. Later that month she took on male opposition in the White Rose Stakes at Hurst Park and recorded her first success as she won by a neck from the colt Fellermelad. On 4 June Ambiguity, partnered by the 18-year-old apprentice jockey Joe Mercer, started at odds of 18/1 in a 21-runner field for the 175th running of the Oaks over one and a half miles at Epsom Racecourse. The leading contenders appeared to be Happy Laughter, Brolly, Nectarine (Lingfield Oaks Trial), Noemi (Princess Elizabeth Stakes), Donica (Prix Cléopâtre) and Bebe Grande (Cheveley Park Stakes). After tracking the leaders, Ambiguity went to the front a furlong from the finish and stayed on strongly to win by a length from Kerkeb, with Noemi taking third ahead of Happy Laughter.

Ambiguity lost her form after her Oaks win and finished unplaced in most of her subsequent although she did finish second in the Oxfordshire Stakes at Newbury Racecourse in August. In October she was stepped up in distance and started at odds of 9/4 for the Jockey Club Cup over two miles at Newmarket Racecourse. With Mercer again in the saddle she returned to her best form to win from the colt Blarney Stone, who had won the race in the previous year.

== Assessment and honours ==
In their book, A Century of Champions, based on the Timeform rating system, John Randall and Tony Morris rated Ambiguity an "inferior" winner of the Oaks.

== Breeding record ==
At the end of her racing career, Ambiguity was retired to become a broodmare in England and was later exported to the United States. She produced at least eight foals and four winners between 1957 and 1971:

- Redoubt, a bay colt, foaled in 1957, sired by Court Martial. Winner.
- Redoubtable, chestnut colt, 1958, by Court Martial. Unraced.
- Tendentious, bay filly, 1959, by Tenerani. Winner. Dam of Politico who won the Chester Vase and St Simon Stakes and was the sire of Party Politics
- Cat And Fiddle, chestnut filly, 1961, by Mossborough. Winner. Dam of Quid Kit (Fair Grounds Oaks).
- Double Amber, chestnut filly, 1964, by Sicambre. Failed to win in five races.
- Miss Milesian, bay filly, 1967, by Milesian. Unraced.
- Give A Cheer, bay filly, 1968, by Gun Bow. Unraced.
- Mr Whiteface, bay colt, 1971, by Crimson Satan. Winner.

== Pedigree ==
Pedigree of Ambiguity (GB), bay mare, 1950
Sire Big Game (GB) 1939	Bahram (GB); 1932	Blandford (IRE)	Swynford (GB)
Sire Big Game (GB) 1939	Bahram (GB); 1932	Blandford (IRE)	Blanche
Sire Big Game (GB) 1939	Bahram (GB); 1932	Friar's Daughter	Friar Marcus (IRE)
Sire Big Game (GB) 1939	Bahram (GB); 1932	Friar's Daughter	Garron Lass
Sire Big Game (GB) 1939	Myrobella (IRE); 1930	Tetratema (GB)	The Tetrarch (IRE)
Sire Big Game (GB) 1939	Myrobella (IRE); 1930	Tetratema (GB)	Scotch Gift (IRE)
Sire Big Game (GB) 1939	Myrobella (IRE); 1930	Dolabella	White Eagle (GB)
Sire Big Game (GB) 1939	Myrobella (IRE); 1930	Dolabella	Gondolette (GB)
Dam Amber Flash (GB) 1942	Precipitation (GB); 1933	Hurry On	Marcovil
Dam Amber Flash (GB) 1942	Precipitation (GB); 1933	Hurry On	Toute Suite
Dam Amber Flash (GB) 1942	Precipitation (GB); 1933	Double Life (IRE)	Bachelor's Double
Dam Amber Flash (GB) 1942	Precipitation (GB); 1933	Double Life (IRE)	Saint Joan
Dam Amber Flash (GB) 1942	Traffic Light (GB); 1933	Solario (IRE)	Gainsborough (GB)
Dam Amber Flash (GB) 1942	Traffic Light (GB); 1933	Solario (IRE)	Sun Worship (GB)
Dam Amber Flash (GB) 1942	Traffic Light (GB); 1933	Point Duty	Grand Parade
Dam Amber Flash (GB) 1942	Traffic Light (GB); 1933	Point Duty	Pinprick (Family 1-p)
