= Scottish Rifle =

Irish-bred Thoroughbred racehorse

- Sire: Sunny Way
- Grandsire: Honeyway
- Dam: Radiopye
- Damsire: Bright News
- Sex: Stallion
- Foaled: 28 February 1969
- Country: Ireland
- Colour: Black
- Breeder: Woodpark Stud
- Owner: A J Struthers
- Trainer: John Dunlop
- Record: 22: 10-5-2

Major wins
- Predominate Stakes (1972); Gordon Stakes (1972); March Stakes (1972); Earl of Sefton Stakes (1973); Brigadier Gerard Stakes (1973); Westbury Stakes (1973); Eclipse Stakes (1973); Cumberland Lodge Stakes (1973)

Awards
- Timeform rating 123 (1972), 127 (1973)

Scottish Rifle (28 February 1969 – 1984) was an Irish-bred British-trained Thoroughbred racehorse and sire. After winning one minor race as a juvenile he emerged as a top-class middle distance colt in 1972, winning the Predominate Stakes, Gordon Stakes and March Stakes as well as finishing second in the Irish Derby. He reached his peak as a four-year-old in 1973, winning the Earl of Sefton Stakes, Brigadier Gerard Stakes, Westbury Stakes, Eclipse Stakes and Cumberland Lodge Stakes. He also finished second in the Prince of Wales's Stakes and the Benson and Hedges Gold Cup and ran third in the Washington D C International. After his retirement from racing he stood as a breeding stallion in England and Czechoslovakia but had little success as a sire of winners. He died in 1984.

== Background ==
Scottish Rifle was a "tall, short coupled" black horse bred in Ireland by the Woodpark Stud. As a yearling he was offered for sale and bought for 3,600 guineas by representatives of the Scottish shipowner A J "Sandy" Struthers. The colt was sent into training with John Dunlop at Arundel in West Sussex. He was ridden in most of his races by the Australian jockey Ron Hutchinson and was usually equipped with a sheepskin noseband.

Scottish Rifle's sire Sunny Way was a good staying handicapper who won the King George V Stakes in 1960. He stood as a breeding stallion in Europe for a few years before being exported to Venezuela. His dam Radiopye was a successful handicapper who went on to produce the Nunthorpe Stakes winner Caterina. Other descendants of Radiopye have included Winter, Cricket Ball (four-time winner of the Prix de Meautry), Mubtaker (runner-up in the Prix de l'Arc de Triomphe) and Great Eastern (Wokingham Stakes, Prix de Meautry).

== Racing career ==
=== 1971: two-year-old season ===
On his racecourse debut, Scottish rifle finished third in a race over six furlongs and then recorded his first success over seven furlongs at Ayr Racecourse in July. In his two subsequent races that year he finished second in nurseries (handicap races for two-year-olds) at York and Ayr.

=== 1972: three-year-old season ===
On his three-year-old debut Scottish Rifle finished second to Baragoi in the Blue Riband Trial Stakes at Epsom Downs Racecourse in April with Rheingold in fourth. He then dropped down in class and won the Somerset Stakes against moderate opposition over ten furlongs at Bath. At Goodwood Racecourse in May he was moved up to one and a half miles for the Predominate Stakes, a major trial race for The Derby, in which his opponents included the Sandown Classic Trial winner Pentland Firth. After struggling to obtain a clear run in the straight he took the lead in the closing stages and beat Pentland Firth by half a length. In the 193rd running of the Epsom Derby, Scottish Rifle started at odds of 22/1 in a field of 22 runners. He met trouble in running on the descent to Tattenham Corner but stayed on steadily to finish sixth to Roberto who won narrowly from Rheingold with Pentland Firth in third. In the Irish Derby at the Curragh on 1 July he started at 16/1 in a field which included Roberto, Ballymore (Irish 2000 Guineas) and Lyphard. After being restrained by Hutchinson in the early stages he made progress approaching the final turn and took the lead two furlongs out. He was gradually worn down by Steel Pulse after a protracted struggle and was beaten a length into second with a gap of six lengths back to Ballymore in third.

A month after his run in Ireland, Scottish Rifle was opposed by only two rivals when he started the 4/6 favourite for the Gordon Stakes at Goodwood. In a change of tactics he took the lead from the start and won by half a length from the Chester Vase winner Ormindo with four lengths back to Open Season (Railway Stakes) in third. Later in August the colt started 4/9 favourite for the March Stakes over one and three quarter miles at the same course and won "in style" from the Dick Hern-trained Ribomio. On his final start of the season he was sent to France for the Prix Royal-Oak over 3100 metres at Longchamp Racecourse on 17 September. He made no impact and finished at the rear of the field behind Pleben.

=== 1973: four-year-old season ===
As a four-year-old Scottish Rifle was brought back in distance and began his campaign with three consecutive wins in Group Three events. He won the Earl of Sefton Stakes at Newmarket Racecourse in April, giving seven pounds and a one and a half length beating Royal Prerogative at odds of 10/1 with Baragoi in third. The construction of a new grandstand at Sandown Park meant that the course was unavailable for most of the year, with most of the important fixtures being transferred to Kempton Park Racecourse. It was therefore at Kempton later in April that Scottish Rifle won the Brigadier Gerard Stakes at odds of 5/4, beating Gombos by four lengths. At the same track in May, the black colt started at odds of 8/11 for the Westbury Stakes (now the Gordon Richards Stakes) and won by a length from Coup de Feu, to whom he was conceding four pounds. On his next appearance, Scottish Rifle was sent to Royal Ascot for the Prince of Wales's Stakes and was beaten a neck into second place by the French-trained colt Gift Card. Hutchinson had restrained the horse at the rear of the field for most of the way and his exaggerated waiting tactics attracted much criticism as he was perceived to have given his mount far too much ground to make up in the last quarter mile. Timeform commented that Scottish Rifle "ought to have won".

The Eclipse Stakes, run in 1973 at Kempton attracted a field of six runners with Scottish Rifle being made the 15/8 favourite ahead of Moulton, Toujours Pret (Prix d'Harcourt), Sharp Edge (Irish 2000 Guineas) and Sun Prince (Prix Robert Papin, St James's Palace Stakes) and Bog Road. Scottish Rifle went to the front from the start and set a steady pace before accelerating in the straight. He never looked in any danger of defeat and won by a length and a short head from Moulton and Sun Prince. In the King George VI and Queen Elizabeth Stakes three weeks later Scottish Rifle moved up to dispute the lead in the straight but then faded to finish seventh of the twelve runners behind Dahlia. At York Racecourse in August Scottish Rifle contested the second running of the Benson and Hedges Gold Cup. Moulton, Toujours Pret and Sun Prince were again in opposition but Rheingold was made the odds-on favourite. Hutchinson attempted to repeat the tactics he had used in the Eclipse, setting a steady pace before quickening in the straight. On this occasion however, he was overtaken by Moulton a furlong out and beaten two and a half lengths into second place with Rheingold four lengths back in third.

Scottish Rifle was given a five-week break before returning in the Cumberland Lodge Stakes over ten furlongs at Ascot in September. With Hutchinson recuperating from an injury he was ridden by Lester Piggott and produced a strong late run to win from Prominent (Prix Foy) and Club House at odds of 4/11. In October he was again ridden by Piggott when he contested the Champion Stakes over ten furlongs at Newmarket and finished seventh behind the Irish-trained three-year-old filly Hurry Harriet. On his final racecourse appearance Scottish Rifle was sent to the United States as his owner accepted an invitation for the colt to represent Britain in the 22nd Washington D C International at Laurel Park. Starting the complete outsider in an eight-runner field he raced prominently from the start and finished third behind Dahlia and Big Spruce.

== Assessment ==
In the 1971 Free Handicap, a ranking of the season best British two-year-olds, Scottish Rifle was given a weight of 113 pounds, twenty pounds below the top-rated Crowned Prince. In 1972 the independent Timeform organization gave him a rating of 123, eleven pounds inferior to their highest-rated three-year-old colts Sallust and Deep Diver. In the Free Handicap, a ranking of the best British three-year-olds he was rated twelve pounds behind the top-rated Deep Diver. In the following year he was rated 127 by Timeform (ten pounds behind their best Older Male Rheingold) and was the fourth highest money-winner in Britain behind Dahlia, Mysterious and Morston.

== Stud record ==
At the end of his racing career, Scottish Rifle was syndicated at a price of £7,000 a share, giving him a theoretical value of £280,000. He began his career as a breeding stallion at the Sussex Stud at West Grinstead. He was exported to Czechoslovakia in 1979 and died in 1984. His best winners included Al Trui (Stewards' Cup), Amber Rambler (Future Champion Novices' Chase) and Arva, a filly who won the Czechoslovak Triple Crown.

== Pedigree ==
Pedigree of Scottish Rifle (GB), black stallion, 1969
Sire Sunny Way (GB) 1957	Honeyway (GB); 1941	Fairway	Phalaris
Sire Sunny Way (GB) 1957	Honeyway (GB); 1941	Fairway	Scapa Flow
Sire Sunny Way (GB) 1957	Honeyway (GB); 1941	Honey Buzzard	Papyrus
Sire Sunny Way (GB) 1957	Honeyway (GB); 1941	Honey Buzzard	Lady Peregrine
Sire Sunny Way (GB) 1957	Red Sunset (GB); 1941	Solario	Gainsborough
Sire Sunny Way (GB) 1957	Red Sunset (GB); 1941	Solario	Sun Worship
Sire Sunny Way (GB) 1957	Red Sunset (GB); 1941	Dulce	Asterus
Sire Sunny Way (GB) 1957	Red Sunset (GB); 1941	Dulce	Dorina
Dam Radiopye (GB) 1954	Bright News (GB); 1943	Stardust	Hyperion
Dam Radiopye (GB) 1954	Bright News (GB); 1943	Stardust	Sister Stella
Dam Radiopye (GB) 1954	Bright News (GB); 1943	Inkling	Son-in-Law
Dam Radiopye (GB) 1954	Bright News (GB); 1943	Inkling	Gleam
Dam Radiopye (GB) 1954	Silversol (IRE); 1940	Solenoid	Soldennis
Dam Radiopye (GB) 1954	Silversol (IRE); 1940	Solenoid	Shannon Jug
Dam Radiopye (GB) 1954	Silversol (IRE); 1940	Silver Lady	Old Rowley
Dam Radiopye (GB) 1954	Silversol (IRE); 1940	Silver Lady	Elland (Family 15-a)
