= Desert Hero =

British Thoroughbred racehorse

- Sire: Sea the Stars
- Grandsire: Cape Cross
- Dam: Desert Breeze
- Damsire: Dubawi
- Sex: Colt
- Foaled: 29 January 2020 (age 6)
- Country: Great Britain
- Colour: Chestnut
- Breeder: Queen Elizabeth II
- Owner: King Charles III and Queen Camilla
- Racing colours
- Trainer: William Haggas
- Record: 7:4-0-2
- Earnings: £261,083

Major wins
- King George V Stakes (2023); Gordon Stakes (2023)

Desert Hero (foaled 29 January 2020) is a British racehorse. He is owned by King Charles III and Queen Camilla. He was born in 2020 and was bred by Queen Elizabeth II. In 2023, he won the King George V Stakes at Royal Ascot.

== Career ==
Desert Hero was foaled on 29 January 2020. He was bred by Queen Elizabeth II as part of her breeding programmes. His sire was the former Epsom Derby winner Sea the Stars. He was formerly owned by the Queen until her death in 2022, when he was inherited by King Charles III.

Desert Hero started racing in 2022, winning his debut race at the Novice Stakes at Haydock Park Racecourse. He also won the Novice Stakes at Redcar Racecourse. in his first race of 2023, Desert Hero finished outside of the top 5. His next race came at Royal Ascot whereby his trainer William Haggas had aimed for at least one of the King's horses to win as the King was attending all five days. Being ridden by Tom Marquand and starting in stall 21, Desert Hero won the King George V Stakes, giving King Charles his first Royal Ascot winner since becoming king. Marquand's ride in this race won him the 2023 Lester Award for Flat Ride of the Year. Desert Hero followed this up with a win in the Gordon Stakes at Glorious Goodwood.

Desert Hero later raced in the St Leger Stakes at Doncaster Racecourse, being watched by King Charles and Queen Camilla but only finished third. There were plans for Desert Hero to race in the Melbourne Cup and he had received first acceptance and Racing Victoria's pre-quarantine tests, but it was decided not to enter him in order to rest him after the St Leger Stakes race as well as to allow him to mature more.

In his 2024 season, Desert Hero did not win a race but finished second in the Gordon Richards Stakes.
