= Earl of Sefton Stakes =

Flat horse race in Britain

- Class: Group 3
- Location: Rowley Mile; Newmarket, England
- Inaugurated: 1971
- Race type: Flat / Thoroughbred
- Sponsor: Bet365
- Website: Newmarket

Race information
- Distance: 1m 1f (1,811 metres)
- Surface: Turf
- Track: Straight
- Qualification: Four-years-old and up
- Weight: 9 st 2 lb Allowances; 3 lb for fillies and mares Penalties; 7 lb for Group 1 winners * 5 lb for Group 2 winners * 3 lb for Group 3 winners * * since 31 August last year
- Purse: £85,000 (2025); 1st: £48,204

Earl Of Sefton Stakes
2026
Damysus	King's Gambit	Boiling Point

Previous years
2025
Persica	Ottoman Fleet	First Conquest
2024
Ottoman Fleet	Astro King	Hi Royal
2023
Ottoman Fleet	Poker Face	Raadobarg
2022
Master Of The Seas	Megallan	Brunch
2021
My Oberon	Marie's Diamond	San Donato

2020-2011
2019
Zabeel Prince	Forest Ranger	Mustashry
2018
Forest Ranger	Deauville	Euginio
2017
Steel of Madrid	Folkswood	Spark Plug
2016
Mahsoob	Air Pilot	Tullius
2015
French Navy	Arod	Mondialiste
2014
Mull Of Killough	French Navy	Fencing
2013
Mull Of Killough	Stipulate	Bonfire
2012
Questioning	Twice Over	Beatrice Aurore
2011
Ransom Note	Polytechnicien	Elusive Pimpernel

2010-2001
2010
Sri Putra	Tranquil Tiger	Palavicini
2009
Tazeez	Steele Tango	Twice Over
2008
Phoenix Tower	Traffic Guard	Pipedreamer
2007
Manduro	Speciosa	Final Verse
2006
Notnowcato	Kew Green	Tolpuddle
2005
Norse Dancer	Hurricane Alan	Valixir
2004
Gateman	Kalaman	Hurricane Alan
2003
Olden Times	Desert Deer	Priors Lodge
2002
Indian Creek	Island House	Dandoun
2001
Right Wing	Albarahin	Fanaar

2000-1991
2000
Indian Lodge	Fairy Godmother	Mujahid
1999
Shiva	Haami	Green Card
1998
Apprehension	Almushtarak	Alezal
1997
Ali-Royal	Wixim	Amrak Ajeeb
1996
Luso	Smart Alec	First Island
1995
Desert Shot	Overbury	Airport
1994
Del Deya	Ventiquattrofogli	Needle Gun
1993
Ezzoud	Cloud Of Dust	Lord Of The Field
1992
Sure Sharp	Adam Smith	Flashfoot
1991
Terimon	Emperor Fountain	Ruby Tiger

1990-1988
1990
Terimon	Citidancer	Pirate Army
1989
Reprimand	Petrullo	Charmer
1988
Media Starguest	Bengal Fire	Shady Heights

The Earl of Sefton Stakes is a Group 3 flat horse race in Great Britain open to horses aged four years or older. It is run over a distance of 1 mile and 1 furlong (1,811 metres) on the Rowley Mile at Newmarket in mid-April.

== History ==
The event was established in 1971, and it was initially called the Rubbing House Stakes. The first running was won by Pembroke Castle.

The race was renamed the Earl of Sefton Stakes in 1973 in memory of Hugh Molyneux (1898–1972), the seventh Earl of Sefton.

The Earl of Sefton Stakes is currently held on the first day of Newmarket's three-day Craven Meeting, the day before the Craven Stakes.

== Records ==
Most successful horse (2 wins):

- Terimon – 1990, 1991
- Mull of Killough - 2013, 2014
- Ottoman Fleet - 2023, 2024

Leading jockey (5 wins):

- William Buick - Questioning (2012), French Navy (2015), Master Of The Seas (2022), Ottoman Fleet (2023, 2024)

Leading trainer (7 wins):

- Sir Henry Cecil – Gunner B (1978), Ivano (1983), Legend of France (1984), Reprimand (1989), Ali-Royal (1997), Shiva (1999), Phoenix Tower (2008)

== Winners ==
Year	Winner	Age	Jockey	Trainer	Time
1971	Pembroke Castle	4	Geoff Lewis	Noel Murless	1:52.97
1972	Lord David	4	Lester Piggott	Staff Ingham	1:58.30
1973	Scottish Rifle	4	Ron Hutchinson	John Dunlop	1:51.80
1974	Owen Dudley	4	Geoff Lewis	Noel Murless	1:52.98
1975	Jimsun	6	Joe Mercer	Herbert Jones	2:03.29
1976	Chil the Kite	4	Geoff Lewis	Bruce Hobbs	1:52.12
1977	Heaven Knows	4	Brian Taylor	Ron Smyth	1:52.51
1978	Gunner B	5	Joe Mercer	Henry Cecil	1:55.48
1979	Hawaiian Sound	4	Steve Cauthen	Barry Hills	1:53.54
1980	Ela-Mana-Mou	4	Willie Carson	Dick Hern	1:50.88
1981	Hard Fought	4	Walter Swinburn	Michael Stoute	1:54.52
1982	Kalaglow	4	Greville Starkey	Guy Harwood	1:51.06
1983	Ivano	4	Lester Piggott	Henry Cecil	1:57.69
1984	Legend of France	4	Joe Mercer	Henry Cecil	1:51.49
1985	King of Clubs	4	Pat Eddery	Ian Balding	1:52.73
1986	Supreme Leader	4	Philip Robinson	Clive Brittain	1:59.02
1987	K-Battery	6	Pat Eddery	Bill Elsey	1:54.53
1988	Media Starguest	4	Ray Cochrane	Luca Cumani	1:51.90
1989	Reprimand	4	Steve Cauthen	Henry Cecil	1:56.51
1990	Terimon	4	Ray Cochrane	Clive Brittain	1:49.15
1991	Terimon	5	Michael Roberts	Clive Brittain	1:49.23
1992	Sure Sharp	5	Steve Cauthen	Barry Hills	1:52.05
1993	Ezzoud	4	Walter Swinburn	Michael Stoute	1:51.42
1994	Del Deya	4	Frankie Dettori	John Gosden	1:56.82
1995	Desert Shot	5	Walter Swinburn	Michael Stoute	1:48.73
1996	Luso	4	Michael Kinane	Clive Brittain	1:47.96
1997	Ali-Royal	4	Kieren Fallon	Henry Cecil	1:50.46
1998	Apprehension	4	Darryll Holland	David Loder	1:58.49
1999 (Note: The 1999 edition was run on Newmarket's July Course over 1 mile and 110 yards)	Shiva	4	Kieren Fallon	Henry Cecil	1:46.60
2000	Indian Lodge	4	Michael Kinane	Amanda Perrett	1:54.90
2001	Right Wing	7	Pat Eddery	John Dunlop	1:54.44
2002	Indian Creek	4	Richard Quinn	David Elsworth	1:49.66
2003	Olden Times	5	Kieren Fallon	John Dunlop	1:52.58
2004	Gateman	7	Keith Dalgleish	Mark Johnston	1:52.77
2005	Norse Dancer	5	John Egan	David Elsworth	1:49.10
2006	Notnowcato	4	Michael Kinane	Sir Michael Stoute	1:49.21
2007	Manduro	5	Stéphane Pasquier	André Fabre	1:47.26
2008	Phoenix Tower	4	Tom Queally	Henry Cecil	1:54.11
2009	Tazeez	5	Richard Hills	John Gosden	1:47.83
2010	Sri Putra	4	Neil Callan	Michael Jarvis	1:49.33
2011	Ransom Note	4	Michael Hills	Barry Hills	1:49.42
2012	Questioning	4	William Buick	John Gosden	1:50.62
2013	Mull of Killough	7	George Baker	Jane Chapple-Hyam	1:48.58
2014	Mull of Killough	8	Adam Kirby	Jane Chapple-Hyam	1:48.44
2015	French Navy	7	William Buick	Charlie Appleby	1:51.81
2016	Mahsoob	5	Paul Hanagan	John Gosden	1:53.67
2017	Steel Of Madrid (Note: Steel Of Madrid was later exported to Australia and renamed Calderon)	4	Pat Dobbs	Richard Hannon Jr.	1:51.27
2018	Forest Ranger	4	Tony Hamilton	Richard Fahey	1:52.38
2019	Zabeel Prince	6	Andrea Atzeni	Roger Varian	1:52.43
	no race 2020 (Note: The 2020 running was cancelled because of the COVID-19 pandemic in the United Kingdom)
2021	My Oberon	4	James Doyle	William Haggas	1:52.05
2022	Master of The Seas	4	William Buick	Charlie Appleby	1:49.60
2023	Ottoman Fleet	4	William Buick	Charlie Appleby	1:55.17
2024	Ottoman Fleet	5	William Buick	Charlie Appleby	1:47.51
2025	Persica	4	Ryan Moore	Richard Hannon Jr.	1:54.07
2026	Damysus	4	James Doyle	John & Thady Gosden	1:49.92

== See also ==
- Horse racing in Great Britain
- List of British flat horse races
