= Joe Mercer (jockey) =

English jockey (1934–2021)

Joe Mercer OBE
Personal information
- Born: 25 October 1934 Bradford, Yorkshire, England
- Died: 17 May 2021 (aged 86)
- Occupation: Jockey

Horse racing career
- Sport: Horse racing
- Career wins: 2,810 in Britain

Major racing wins
- British Classic Race wins: Epsom Oaks (1953); St. Leger Stakes (1965, 1974, 1980, 1981); 2,000 Guineas Stakes (1971); 1,000 Guineas Stakes (1974, 1979); Irish Classic Race wins: Irish 2,000 Guineas (1973); Irish Derby (1959); Irish St Leger (1965); French Classic Race wins: Prix de Diane (1974)

Racing awards
- British flat racing Champion Apprentice (1952, 1953); British flat racing Champion Jockey (1979)

Honours
- OBE

Significant horses
- Brigadier Gerard, Bustino, Highclere, Kris, Le Moss

1000 Guineas (2)
1974
Highclere	Polygamy	Mrs Tiggywinkle
1979
One in a Million	Abbeydale	Yanuka

2000 Guineas (1)
1971
Brigadier Gerard	Mill Reef	My Swallow

Oaks (1)
1953
Ambiguity	Kerkeb	Noemi

St Leger (4)
1965
Provoke	Meadow Court	Solstice
1974
Bustino	Giacometti	Riboson
1980
Light Cavalry	Water Mill	World Leader
1981
Cut Above	Glint of Gold	Bustomi

Joseph Mercer, OBE (25 October 1934 – 17 May 2021) was an English thoroughbred race horse jockey. He was active from 1947 to 1985, riding 2,810 winners in Britain. Mercer's nickname was "Smokin' Joe.”

He was apprenticed to trainer Frederick Sneyd, and he won his first British Classic race on Ambiguity in the 1953 Epsom Oaks as an apprentice. He was British flat racing Champion Apprentice in 1952 and 1953.

He subsequently worked as stable jockey for Jack Colling, Dick Hern, Henry Cecil and Peter Walwyn. While at Cecil's yard, he won his only British flat racing Champion Jockey's title in 1979. Mercer's most successful ride was Brigadier Gerard, who won all but one of 18 races between 1970 and 1972. Mercer won every British Classic except the Derby, although he twice was runner-up.

He retired as a jockey in November 1985, worked briefly as a jockey's agent, and then became racing manager for Maktoum bin Rashid Al Maktoum in 1987. He retired in January 2006.

== Early life ==
Joseph Mercer was born in Bradford, West Yorkshire, to Emmanuel Mercer, a coach painter, and his wife Jessie. He was one of eight children (four boys, four girls).

He rode donkeys on summer holidays at the seaside with his elder brother, Manny, who became a jockey and died tragically in an accident at Ascot in 1959. Manny recommended Joe to the trainer, Fred Sneyd, to whom he was apprenticed.

== Career ==
=== 1950s ===
Mercer rode his first winner for Sneyd on Eldoret in a handicap race at Bath in September 1950. He was British flat racing Champion Apprentice jockey in 1952, when he rode 26 winners, and 1953, when he rode 61. One of his 1953 victories was at Oaks, his first English Classic win. He rode Ambiguity, owned by Lord Astor (William Waldorf Astor, 3rd Viscount Astor) and trained by Jack Colling.

Mercer was stable jockey at the Colling-owned West Ilsley stable, having succeeded Gordon Richards. Mercer and Collins had a successful partnership with a number of fine horses, including: Hornbeam, who won 11 races (including first at the Great Voltigeur Stakes and second in the St Leger, Ascot Gold Cup and Doncaster Cup); Rosalba, who won 6 races (winner of the Coronation Stakes, Queen Elizabeth II Stakes, and Fred Darling Stakes, and 2nd in Petite Etoile's 1000 Guineas); and Counsel, who won 10 races (a top class handicapper and winner of the Greenham Stakes).

Mercer often rode for other stables. A prominent example includes Festoon, the 1000 Guineas winner, which he rode in an unsuccessful bid at the Oaks but later gave him his first Royal Ascot victory in the Coronation Stakes. Mercer also rode a number of Harry Wragg-trained horses, notably Nagami, who came in third in all the colts Classic races of 1958; and Fidalgo, who in 1959 came in second in the Derby and St Leger and won the Irish Derby.

=== 1960s ===
Despite winning his jockey championship with Henry Cecil, it was his relationship with the West Ilsley stable under Dick Hern for which he is most famous. Hern took over as trainer at West Ilsley at the end of 1962 on the retirement of Jack Colling, and there was no question he would remain in place on Hern's takeover. The stable was endowed with several top owner-breeders and was now owned by John Jacob Astor (then known as Jakie Astor, and later as Sir John Astor), who with his brother Lord Astor provided most of the horse firepower.

During the early years of the Hern/Mercer partnership they won races with a series of stayers, including Grey of Falloden who won several stakes races (the Doncaster Cup and Henry II Stakes) but also won the 1964 Cesarewitch Handicap with a then record weight of 9stone 6pounds. The following year the stable hit top form and won both the English St. Leger Stakes and Irish St. Leger Stakes with Provoke (owned by Jakie) and Craighouse (owned by Lord Astor: William Astor, 3rd Viscount Astor) respectively. In both 1964 and 1965 Mercer rode 108 winners in Britain.

In 1966, an equine virus hit the stable, affecting the horses' performance. In 1967 there appeared to be some remission and the stable won 60 races. With this support from his own yard Mercer looked set to gain his first Jockey Championship. However having a comfortable lead mid-August he broke several vertebrae in a fall on a spare ride at Folkestone Racecourse. He was sidelined for the last two and a half months of the season. 1967 saw two future Classic possibles emerge in Remand and La Mome, but more importantly the Queen (Elizabeth II) first began to send horses to be trained by Dick Hern, thus initiating Mercer's tenure as a Royal Jockey. (However, for a few years another Royal Trainer Ian Balding did continue to use in addition Geoff Lewis and Lester Piggott). At the end of the 1967 season another important owner-breeder Brook Holliday began to send his horses to Hern, who had previously been the private trainer to his father (Major Lionel Holliday) at Newmarket.

1968 promised much and Mercer scored two early victories in Classic Trials when Heathen (owned by Holliday) won the Greenham Stakes and La Mome (owned by Jakie Astor) won the Princess Elizabeth Stakes. Early in May, Remand (owned also by Astor) beat Connaught in the Chester Vase, a recognised Epsom Derby trial, whilst giving the Noel Murless trained colt weight. Soon afterwards the horses appeared to lose form and Dick Hern described Remand's appearance in the paddock at Epsom prior to the Derby as being 'horrible, his coat was standing up like a hedgehog'. Beaten by both Sir Ivor and the Chester Vase second, Connaught, Remand finished fourth. Through the equine virus in the stables, Mercer missed a good chance of winning the Derby, a race he was ultimately never to win. Remand was very ill after the race, not appearing again that season and the stable went into decline. Despite shutting down completely for months on end, the virus did not leave the stable until the end of the 1969 season. However Mercer did manage to win the Doncaster Cup, a leading late-season Group race for his stable with The Accuser.

Despite these setbacks Mercer remained loyal to Major Hern and West Ilsley. He did ride for many other stables and was particularly supported by Derrick Candy, for whom he rode horses such as Parbury (Ascot Gold Cup), Song (1968 Champion Sprinter and winner of the New Stakes, Temple Stakes, King's Stand Stakes and Diadem Stakes) and Fair Winter (Nassau Stakes), and Peter Walwyn, who was just developing a string of horses that became prominent in the 1970s. In 1969 he formed a successful partnership with Candy's staying horse High Line, taking many Group races. He also rode for the trainer John Sutcliffe, winning on such horses as Right Tack and Jimmy Reppin early in their careers.

By the end of the 1960s, he was one of the top jockeys in the country. His main rival at this time was Lester Piggott, who is reported to have said "There are only two real jockeys and the other one is Joe Mercer." When Piggott declined the ride on Petingo in order to ride Sir Ivor in the 1968 2,000 Guineas Stakes, Mercer was booked to ride Petingo by Piggott's father-in-law, Sam Armstrong. On Petingo he won the Craven Stakes and then finished second in the 2000 Guineas. Similarly when Piggott was unavailable for Ribofilio's 2,000 Guineas Trial in early 1969, Mercer took the ride and won on this Johnson-Houghton trained colt, already favourite for the 2000 Guineas.

=== 1970s ===
Mercer's loyalty was repaid in 1970, but the year started inauspiciously. He had spent the winter riding in India, could not bring home his earnings due to exchange control issues and decided to buy jewels to export instead. He failed to declare possession of two diamonds and was imprisoned for several weeks by the Indian authorities, missing the first month of the flat season.

He received letters from West Ilsley, praising a talented two-year-old - Brigadier Gerard.

“When I returned to the yard, I learned that he had already made something of a reputation for himself. Everybody who had ridden him had been thrown off – just the once – as if he was saying: ‘I’m the boss.’ The first time I rode him he did the same to me: he just whipped round, dropped his shoulder, dumped me on the ground and stood there looking at me: ‘That’s your place, down there!’”

— Joe Mercer on Brigadier Gerard

On his return at the end of April, Jimmy Lindley retained the ride on the then stable star Highest Hopes in the One Thousand Guineas. He also missed the maiden win of the Queen's first good horse Charlton. He did ride him to his second win in the Predominate Stakes (now the Cocked Hat Stakes) at Goodwood in May. Unfortunately injury to the colt prevented his taking part in that year's Epsom Derby. Mercer may never have won The Derby but he gave a fine ride on Great Wall in Nijinsky's 1970 Derby. Great Wall had run very wide when he'd run in his Derby Trial and it seemed unwise for Scobie Breasley, his trainer, to declare him for Epsom and expect him to get round Tattenham Corner. Mercer got the ride for the first time and the colt's odds of 80 to 1 seemed ungenerous. Mercer kept his horse at the back of the field and going into Tattenham Corner had only one horse behind him. Entering the corner he set the colt alight on the rails to such effect that he passed the whole field in about a furlong and was leading the field with about two furlongs to go. He was then squeezed up by the giant French colt Gyr and was just run out of third place by Stintino.

By the end of June 1970 the noted Brigadier Gerard had made his debut for Major Hern. There is little doubt that the Brigadier provided an enormous boost to the stable winning his four races in 1970, including the Group 1 Middle Park Stakes. In addition, Highest Hopes (owned by Holliday) came back from her disappointing run in the 1000 Guineas and won the Prix Eugène Adam and the Prix Vermeille, beating Caro and Lupe. The stable sustained its form until end of the season with Charlton proving to be slightly below the best, fourth in the St Leger; Heavenly Thought (owned by Lord Rotherwick, who purchased many of the now-deceased Lord Astor's horses) winning a handful of good races; and Fine Blade who at that time did not appear far behind Brigadier Gerard in ability. The end of the season saw a lot of activity as the last named was removed from the stable, together with the rest of Brook Holliday's horses following a payment disagreement with Hern. At the same time news arrived that following the retirement from training of Gordon Richards, his owners Sir Michael Sobell and Lady Beaverbrook would be transferring their horses to Dick Hern.

Jakie Astor negotiated to sell West Ilsley to Sobell and his son-in-law Arnold Weinstock on the understanding that both Hern and Mercer were kept in place as trainer and stable jockey respectively. Before the 1971 flat season started most interest was on the Lady Beaverbrook-owned pair of Seaepic and Seaswan (both sired by Sea Bird II). Both disappointed in their trial races and later, whilst Brigadier Gerard, without a prep race, won what would in hindsight be regarded as the best Two Thousand Guineas since 1947. A Sobell/Weinstock-owned colt, Homeric, won the Lingfield Derby Trial ridden by Mercer. Homeric was the stable's first Derby runner since 1968 when running at Epsom but was outclassed by Mill Reef, finishing fifth. Later in the year Homeric finished second in the St. Leger under Mercer's ride. Brigadier Gerard finished the year the unbeaten winner of six races (five of them Group One). The new power to appear was in the two-year-old ranks, where three smart colts ran at Royal Ascot, all ridden by Mercer. Sun Prince, as a maiden, won the Coventry Stakes and later followed up by winning the Prix Robert Papin in France then finishing third in the Middle Park Stakes. Fellow maiden Sallust was made favourite for the Windsor Castle Stakes but finished unplaced. However he won his next race before ending his season with a win in the Richmond Stakes at Goodwood Racecourse. The third colt, Rampage, having won his maiden decisively attempted the Norfolk Stakes despite the presence of good horses such as Deep Diver and Philipp of Spain. Unfortunately Rampage died of a heart attack during the race.

Mercer rode the Queen's first good filly at West Ilsley, Albany, to two victories that year. Starting the season by winning the Sandleford Priory Stakes at Newbury Racecourse in May and failing to stay the distance in The Oaks trip ran out a good winner of the two furlongs shorter Prix de la Psyche in France. Mercer rode the Brigadier in all his six wins but he also rode Lady Beaverbrook's Relko colt, Royalty, who set up an unbeaten run of six wins in the UK. It was felt that the horse may have improved enough to take his chance in the 1971 Arc de Triomphe against Mill Reef; and he did finish a creditable sixth. 1971 also saw Lord Rotherwick's Colum appear, who went on to secure wins in races which included the Dee Stakes, ultimately running and winning both in the UK and in France until the end of 1973. 1971 also saw Mercer's first winner as a jockey for trainer Henry Cecil: Pert Lassie being the first leg of a Mercer treble at the inaugural Timeform Cancer Charity Day at Doncaster.

If 1971 was a good year for Mercer and his stable, 1972 was even better in the quantity of money won and Hern ended up Champion Trainer. Brigadier Gerard was of course the main money winner, winning seven of his eight races (six of which would today be considered group one races) with Mercer in the saddle on all occasions. The Sunday prior to the Brigadier's third race of the season (at Royal Ascot) Mercer flew to France in a small plane with three others. Soon after take-off the plane crashed and luckily Mercer was thrown clear. He rushed back to the plane and pulled out the trainer Bill Marshall. He could not get the pilot out of the wreckage and gave up trying just before the plane exploded. Unsurprisingly Mercer was shaken up and there was talk that he would not take the ride on the Brigadier on the first day of Royal Ascot. After taking a day off Mercer declared himself fit to ride on the Tuesday of Royal Ascot and he lined up on Brigadier Gerard for the Prince of Wales's Stakes. As it was the Brigadier gave one of his most stunning displays beating a field which included the future Irish Derby winner, Steel Pulse, effortlessly. Unlike other runs Mercer reported that the horse did not pull as much as usual. However Mercer felt unwell after the race and did not ride again at the meeting or for the next week. That same Tuesday, Sun Prince won the St. James's Palace Stakes under Mercer's friend Jimmy Lindley, who replaced the sidelined Mercer. Sun Prince had been ridden into third place in the 2000 Guineas by Mercer, running behind High Top and the eventual Derby winner Roberto.

By this stage Mercer appeared to have three of the best milers in the country to ride as apart from Sun Prince and Brigadier, Sallust had revealed himself as top class. This colt announced his return to the top with a fine display at Epsom to win the Diomed Stakes. Ridden again by Mercer in a virtual match at Goodwood he wore down the 2000 Guineas winner High Top in a thrilling Sussex Stakes. In late August he returned to Goodwood to win the Goodwood Mile and by then was regarded as the best 3yo miler in England. In October he finished his career with a scintillating defeat of Lyphard in Mercer's hands at Longchamp to prove himself European's top 3yo miler.

Of the older horses Royalty was injured without running but Homeric stood out: even if a little frustrating. In his second race of 1972 he took on Mill Reef in the Coronation Cup. Mercer took over the lead from Mill Reef's pacemaker and Homeric, kept beautifully balanced, was driven for the line. Joined by Mill Reef at the furlong pole everyone expected the latter to stride away but Geoff Lewis had to ride his Derby winner for all he was worth. He just hung on and won by a neck from Homeric. Mercer missed Homeric's run at Royal Ascot but next rode this colt to win the Prix Maurice de Nieuil, whereupon Homeric was transferred to Jack Cunnington in France.

1973 was a quieter year for Mercer after '72. Boldboy announced his arrival on the racing scene by winning the Greenham Stakes as a maiden gelding and the Astor colt, Sharp Edge, who had won three races when ridden by Mercer as a 2yo in 1972, won him his first Irish 2000 Guineas after finishing third in the 2000 Guineas at Newmarket. Sharp Edge then went on to win the Prix Jean Prat in France. A new staying 3yo emerged in the shape of Buoy, whose owner Dick Hollingsworth had moved his horses to Dick Hern in 1972 (although they didn't run that season). Buoy picked up a good maiden at Newmarket before taking the Predominate Stakes Derby Trial at Goodwood. Sidestepping the Derby, he next appeared in the Irish Derby, running 3rd, before going to York and winning the Great Voltigeur Stakes. Buoy rounded off his first season when narrowly beaten in the St Leger. The stable jockey also rode Hollingsworth's other 3yo, Tepukei, to two wins, including the White Rose Stakes at Ascot. Mercer rode Sun Prince to win that colt's third consecutive Royal Ascot victory in the Queen Anne Stakes. Boldboy finished off his season with victories in the Prix de la Porte Maillot at Deauville, Diadem Stakes at Ascot and the Challenge Stakes at Newmarket.

Mercer had another fine year in 1974 and the season really started with an Ascot 3yo maiden double on Pop Song and Gaily; the latter fulfilling the promise of her good runs as a 2yo. (She later went on to win the Irish 1000 Guineas (but ridden by Ron Hutchinson) and was then 3rd in the Irish Oaks when Mercer ridden). Newbury's Spring meeting saw Mercer picking up three winners, including a useful win on Tom Egerton's Final Chord, who went on to complete a hat-trick of wins at Chepstow and Royal Ascot (Britannia Stakes). In addition Appleby Fair, the stable's Derby hope, finished a good second in the Greenham Stakes. This was soon followed by the highly promising victory of the maiden Bustino in the Sandown Classic Trial. The 1,000 Guineas Stakes saw Mercer achieve every jockey's ambition when winning a classic for the reigning monarch. He rode the archetypal Mercer race hitting the front at the distance and trusting the speed, class or momentum of the horse kept him there. In this instance the horse was the Queen's own bred filly Highclere. Not particularly fancied she had form very near the best when placed as a 2yo. On her 2yo debut she had gone down narrowly to Polygamy. A few weeks later she was second again, this time to Celestial Dawn after getting a little lost in the early part of the race. Significantly in that race, receiving 4 pounds, she turned the tables on Polygamy and beat her by 2 lengths. She did win her third race, a maiden at Newbury, but made such hard work of it that by the time of her lining up for 1000 she was relatively forgotten. Mercer came with his well-timed run and led going into the dip. Highclere's main pursuer, and old adversary, Polygamy was baulked in her run and struggled up the hill to catch Highclere. Fifty yards out Polygamy looked the likely winner but Mercer kept Highclere going to the line and the two fillies flashed by the post together. After some delay Highclere was named the short-head winner. Peter Willett in his biography of Dick Hern quotes the Bloodstock Breeders Review of that year:- "A dead heat might have done more justice to this epic struggle, but nothing could detract from Highclere's superb rugged performance, from Mercer's immaculate jockeyship, or from Dick Hern's magnificent training technique." Six weeks later Mercer won his second classic on her when she won the Prix de Diane at Chantilly from a top class field of fillies. Highclere didn't win again but she did run a fine race against Dahlia when second in the King George VI and Queen Elizabeth Stakes.

Appleby Fair failed to make up into a Derby colt and his place was taken at Epsom by what the stable had been considering their St Leger colt, namely Lady Beaverbrook's Bustino. He had won a second classic trial when comfortably winning the Lingfield Derby Trial. He lined up for the Epsom classic with what seemed like a real chance, but was horribly baulked at the top of the hill. He ran on very strongly but could only finish fourth to Snow Knight, a colt Bustino had already comfortably beaten twice in 1974. This was probably Mercer's best chance of winning the Derby. Afterwards Bustino proved his quality by giving Sagaro a good race when second to that good colt in the Grand Prix de Paris on softer going than suited him. He then thrashed the Irish Derby winner English Prince in the Great Voltigeur Stakes by 4 lengths. His season finished at Doncaster when Mercer and Jimmy Lindley, riding the same owner's Riboson, dominated the St. Leger. Mercer guided Bustino to victory with his pacemaker coming in third.

Of the older horses Mercer rode Boldboy to a Lockinge Stakes victory, that gelding having already carried him to an Abernant Stakes victory. Buoy improved on his first season and as a 4yo blossomed into being a top middle distance colt with Mercer riding him in all his victories. After a second in the Jockey Club Stakes, he won the Yorkshire Cup and three weeks later followed this with the Coronation Cup at Epsom. Dahlia was odds-on to win this race but all 5 jockeys riding had instructions to come with a late run. After a ludicrous first furlong with the whole field dawdling along, Mercer took the lead but only at a moderate gallop. However going down towards Tattenham Corner he set Buoy alight such that entering the straight he was 10 lengths clear. By the final furlong he was dead beat but Mercer kept him going to the line to record a one and a half length victory over Tennyson. Buoy's final victory was in the Princess of Wales's Stakes at Newmarket when he beat Jupiter Pluvius in a workmanlike fashion. As regards 2yos two Sobell youngsters came to the fore. The first, Auction Ring, was ridden by Mercer to win a Newbury maiden, before appearing a month later to follow up in the July Stakes at Newmarket. Unfortunately he didn't win again in '74, but ran well to be placed in both the Gimcrack Stakes and the Middle Park Stakes. The second youngster was Bold Pirate and he again won two races, in his case his first and last, the latter being the Prix Roman at Longchamp. But he also was placed in both the Richmond Stakes and Champagne Stakes.

1975 started slowly for Mercer and at the end of April he had ridden only 5 winners, 3 of them for Peter Cundell plus a victory in the Earl of Sefton Stakes for Herbert Jones on Jimsun. Hern's stable was running plenty of horses (including Baronet (Craven Stakes), Harmonise (Free Handicap), Light Duty (Nell Gwyn Stakes) and School Bell (Princess Elizabeth Stakes) all ridden by Mercer) but not winning any and even Boldboy was only second in his opening race of the season. Mercer did not ride Hern's contender for the Fred Darling Stakes (Garden Party) and instead rode the Queen's filly Joking Apart for Ian Balding into 4th place. Bill Curling reports in his book 'All the Queen's Horses' that Irish trainer Stuart Murless (a great fan of Mercer's skills) was seeking Joe to ride his filly Nocturnal Spree in the season's first classic the 1000 Guineas. However Mercer stayed with Joking Apart and rode another finely judged race. He delivered his filly at the distance (just as the previous year on Highclere) and leading up the Rowley Mile hill was run out of it in the final 100 yards by the winner Nocturnal Spree, finally finishing third. On such a tough course Joking Apart probably did not stay the full 8 furlongs and she was confidently expected to return to her 2yo winning form in Royal Ascot's Jersey Stakes. Mercer had no luck in running but blamed himself for his filly's second place. Soon after he made amends when winning the Duchess of Montrose Handicap at Newmarket, and he rounded off her season when she won the 8 furlong Strensall Stakes over the easier York course.

1975 saw Mercer having an increased number of winners and rides for the stable of Ian Balding. The winners included the very useful 2yo filly Outer Circle, Mill Reef's sister Memory Lane and the useful handicapper Idiot's Delight. However, after the Guineas weekend (where Auction Ring failed in the 2000 Guineas) the Hern stable hit form and winners flowed for Mercer.

A feature of the season was the two very good colts owned by Dick Hollingsworth. The first, Zimbalon, got off the mark in a Chester maiden in Mercer's hands. He won his next two races but (in these handicaps) was ridden by other jockeys. Mercer was reunited with him for his fourth victory on the trot. This was Royal Ascot's King George V Handicap and this victory rounded off a treble, all on the Thursday of the meeting. The second winner was Hollingsworth's Alcide colt Sea Anchor. This colt had got off the mark at Sandown when ridden by Mercer to win his maiden impressively. His next race, the King Edward VII Stakes, was a big step up in class but Sea Anchor was a commanding winner. The colt promised much and ran well in both the Irish Derby (4th to Grundy) and Great Voltigeur Stakes (2nd to Patch): however he didn't win again that year.

The third winner of Mercer's Royal Ascot treble was Lord Porchester's hitherto unraced colt Smuggler. Despite being stoutly bred this Exbury colt romped away with the 6 furlong Chesham Stakes. This promising 2yo followed up with a comfortable victory in Newbury's 7 furlong Donnington Castle Stakes and was expected to complete a hat-trick in the Prix de la Salamandre. He ran unaccountably badly and was retired for the season. Hern was blessed with a number of stoutly bred 2yos. Right up with Smuggler was Lady Beaverbrook's Riboboy who Mercer rode to win his debut, the Plantation Maiden stakes, then Goodwood's Lanson Champagne Stakes before missing out at the third time of asking when 7th in the Laurent Perrier Champagne Stakes at Doncaster behind Wollow. Similarly useful was Sir Michael Sobell's colt Over to You who ridden both times by Mercer won the Yattendon Maiden at Newbury first time out and followed this up with a workmanlike victory in the Solario Stakes at Sandown. All useful colts they did not create the same stir that Lady Beaverbrook's Relkino did when he won his first race, the Echinswall Maiden Stakes, most impressively, Mercer ridden. His total eclipse when last in the Washington Singer Stakes was believed to be due to a slight virus going through the stable.

The most remembered race of the year was the so-called 'Race of the Century' held at Ascot in July when Bustino was beaten half a length by the Derby winner Grundy in what many people consider to be one of the greatest races ever run. Bustino had been expected to start his season in the Yorkshire Cup in May. Declared for the race, Dick Hern was forced to withdraw the colt on the morning of the race because his owner, Lady Beaverbrook, did not want him to run in any thing but Group 1 races. Mercer took over the ride on what was to have been Bustino's pacemaker Riboson. Despite being on the effective second string Mercer scored a satisfying victory. Bustino appeared a few weeks later and again, with Riboson as his pacemaker, scored one of his finest victories when winning the Coronation Cup at Epsom in record time. This turned out to be Mercer's only Group 1 winner of the year. The follow-up was the Race of the Century (the 1975 King George VI and Queen Elizabeth Stakes: covered under Bustino) in which Bustino ran with two pacemakers but not his classy, usual pacemaker Riboson, who was injured. Taking up the running earlier than usual, he entered the Ascot straight 4 lengths clear of that year's Derby winner Grundy, who in a thrilling finish beat Bustino by a half-length.

To the outside world Mercer had much to look forward to with a promising group of horses for the 1976 classics. What was not known was that the stable owners, Sir Michael Sobell and Lord Arnold Weinstock, had informed Mercer that 1976 was to be his last as stable jockey and that he was to be replaced by Willie Carson. Both jockeys were sworn to secrecy and, apart from Hern, few others, including the bulk of the owners, knew of this arrangement. All came to the surface in early June 1976.

Against this backdrop 1976 started well for Mercer and important early winners were Relkino in the Ascot 2000 Guineas Trial, Smuggler (Epsom's Warren Stakes), Memory Lane (Epsom's Princess Elizabeth Stakes) and Riboboy (Sandown's Classic Trial Stakes). Relkino then finished 6th in Wollow's 2000 Guineas victory, Smuggler followed up with a 3rd in the Chester Vase but Riboboy finished unplaced in the Lingfield Derby Trial. Mercer elected to ride Relkino in the Derby.

Mercer was picking up several winners in May including twice on Zimbalon (Rosebery Handicap, Ormonde Stakes), Boldboy (Abernant Stakes) and two useful two-year-olds of Dick Hern's Town and Country and Sky Ship. On Derby Day Mercer had his fourth victory of the year on trainer John Nelson's Creetown. He also rode a fine race on Relkino in the Derby. He came with a perfectly timed run to win the race but was then easily brushed aside by the Lester Piggott ridden Empery, and left to finish second. As Relkino never won over further than ten furlongs (as a four-year-old he won the Lockinge Stakes and the Benson and Hedges Gold Cup), it is likely he didn't stay the distance of the Derby.

The next day before racing, Mercer accompanied by Dick Hern and the Queen's racing manager, Lord Porchester, entered the Epsom Press Office. Porchester then read a prepared statement. It said that Mercer would be removed as stable jockey at the end of the season to be replaced by Willie Carson. The announcement created almost universal outcry from the press, Hern's other owners and others in racing. An almost immediate response from John Oaksey on ITV was, 'The mind boggles if you are not satisfied with Joe Mercer'.

There is little doubt that this announcement did harm to nearly everyone involved. Many felt Hern could have reacted differently, but Hern was just a salaried employer of the stable owners. However it did cause a chill between Hern and the Press that only thawed properly when he himself suffered a similar removal. Willie Carson was retained by Clive Brittain and to him it was a huge shock and his principal owner, Captain Marcos Lemos, said ‘ It was the way the whole wretched business was announced. I first heard the news on television. I still maintain I should have been told first'. Even three years later Weinstock said ‘...But I will admit that it was a painful thing, and in some quarters we have never been quite forgiven'.

Within a week Mercer had bounced back and rode five winners at the Newbury Summer meeting, including two for Sobell and Weinstock (Adagio and Sunbelt). However at the same meeting he was found guilty of dangerous riding and received a week's ban. At the same time he announced that he'd been approached by Ian Balding to become his stable jockey, and that he'd had similar offers that he was considering. Soon after this Mercer announced that he was to join Henry Cecil as stable jockey in 1977.

At Royal Ascot Mercer managed only one winner in the shape of the Queen Mary Stakes winner Cramond for Ron Boss. Smuggler was Mercer's next best effort when he finished second in the King Edward VII Stakes. Six weeks later he rode this colt to win the Gordon Stakes at Goodwood. Sea Anchor could finish only third to the outstanding Sagaro in the Ascot Gold Cup. Sea Anchor had earlier won the Henry II Stakes at Sandown and had been fancied for the Ascot big staying race. This colt then went on to win the Goodwood Stakes, Mercer ridden, under the welter burden of 10 stone. Mercer later rode him to win the Doncaster Cup in September.

Returning from his suspension of 7 days Mercer had a treble at the Newmarket July Meeting, of which the most significant winner was the July Stakes winner Sky Ship. This colt had already been ridden by Mercer to win a maiden at Salisbury and he followed this second win up with a win at Goodwood in the Lanson Champagne Stakes, during a fine meeting where he rode 5 winners.

Other significant winners ridden for Hern were Bold Pirate, who won the John Smith's Magnet Cup; Boldboy, who as well as winning the Abernant Stakes, won the Sanyo Stakes at Doncaster; and the Queen's two-year-olds Fife and Drum and Circlet. For other trainers Mercer rode Gunner B (trained by George Toft) to win both the Cecil Frail Handicap and the Doonside Cup and John Cherry to win the Newbury Autumn Cup.

Hern's best two-year-old was the maiden filly Dunfermline, who Mercer rode to be second to the Lester Piggott ridden Miss Pinkie in the Ascot Fillies Mile. It is instructive that while Piggott felt Dunfermline to be ingenuine and the to-be stable jockey Willie Carson considered other fillies in the stable to be more promising, Mercer felt the filly was just green and would improve as a 3yo. Mercer turned out to be right and Her Majesty's filly won three races the next year, including two classics.

Mercer finished the season on 98 winners, his best total since 1965. Appropriately his last winner for Hern as stable jockey was the two-year-old filly Amity. Hern and Mercer remained friends for the rest of Hern's life. A group of Hern's owners presented him with a painting of his portrait surrounded by his classic winners as a leaving present.

Henry Cecil was not only taking on a new stable-jockey in 1977, he was also moving to a new stable. Cecil's father-in-law Noel Murless had retired at the end of 1976 and he was taking over his Warren Place stable yard and most of his horses. He was not taking over the Murless trained Champion two-year-old of 1976 J. O. Tobin who was sent to finish his career in America. Although having been the British flat racing Champion Trainer of 1976 Cecil stated he had no champion horses in his stable for 1977.

Mercer's first winner in 1977 was for Jeremy Hindley, who used Mercer when he was available (amongst his winning rides for Hindley in 1977 was the Royal Ascot winner, He Loves Me, in the Cork and Orrery Stakes: now the Golden Jubilee Stakes). On the final day of the Newmarket Craven meeting Mercer rode his first winner for his new stable when Habeebti won a small handicap for owner Charles St George. Later in the day he rode another winner for Cecil. The next day he rode another double for Cecil at Newbury. The second winner of this double was Royal Blend (again for Charles St George) who a month later followed up in the Predominate Stakes at Goodwood. Unfortunately the colt split a pastern in this race and was unable to race again that season. The Mercer/Cecil partnership was regularly notching winners but the first significant one was St George's four-year-old colt Lucky Wednesday who was a newcomer to Cecil's stable. After running placed in his first race at Newmarket he won his second race at Sandown in the Westbury Stakes (now the Gordon Richards Stakes). In this race Mercer had the pleasure of beating a Willie Carson ridden Relkino. Lucky Wednesday rapidly improved and went on to win the Clive Graham Stakes at Goodwood, followed by the Prince of Wales's Stakes at Royal Ascot. He was then beaten into second in the Eclipse Stakes by Artaius on very firm ground, which he disliked. Cecil felt he was never the same horse again after this run.

Winners continued to flow but bigger wins were few and far between. At Epsom Mercer rode Cecil's Royal Plume in the Derby: the colt had previously won the Dee Stakes at Chester. He did ride Cecil's first ever winner at the Derby meeting when Amboise won a sponsored handicap. Also at the Epsom meeting Mercer rode Gunner B to win the Diomed Stakes for George Toft. Mr Carlo d'Alessio's Aliante proved a useful handicapper winning two good handicaps. The first was the William Hill Gold Cup at Redcar (on a day Mercer rode a four-timer, including another winner for Cecil) and another at Sandown. The best three-year-old to come through was Mr Louis Freedman's Royal Hive, who ended up winning the Park Hill Stakes (under Mercer) at Doncaster, amongst her four wins. She also finished second in the Yorkshire Oaks and Prix Vermeille. Mercer eventually won 102 races in Britain, his first century since 1965. Despite the stable being short of big winners Cecil had numerically his second best season with 74 wins.

1978 saw a major improvement but the season started disappointingly with the complete failure of a horse called Brigata. This three-year-old filly was unraced as a two-year-old yet was strongly fancied for the One Thousand Guineas and was made favourite for her first race, the Nell Gwyn Stakes. She ran unaccountably badly and finished last, and a week later repeated the feat at Ascot in a further Guineas trial. The year did take off with the victory of Gunner B in the Earl of Sefton Stakes at Newmarket. This colt had been transferred by his owner to be trained by Cecil. It proved to be an inspired move as he improved in the hands of Mercer and Cecil to follow up this win with victories in the Brigadier Gerard Stakes, the Prince of Wales's Stakes at Royal Ascot and the Eclipse Stakes at Sandown. This five-year-old colt then ran second in the Benson and Hedges Gold Cup (now the Juddmonte International Stakes) to the Derby second, Hawaiian Sound. He returned to winning ways in the Valdoe Stakes at Goodwood, before ending his season with a third place in Newmarket's Champion Stakes.

Aside from this, the season really got going for Mercer when he rode five winners in two days at Newmarket, all for his retained stable. None of them were big wins but included the stable's first two-year-old winner in Mixed Applause and the three-year-old maiden winner Le Moss. This colt was having only his second run but went on to win his next two races, including the Queen's Vase at Royal Ascot in the hands of Geoff Baxter, as Mercer could not do the weight. When Mercer was reunited with the colt they won the March Stakes at Goodwood. Fancied for the St Leger he became fractious in the preliminaries to the final classic and according to Mercer took no interest in the race. Hit by another horse during the race he suddenly changed mood and finished a fast finishing second to the winner, Julio Mariner. Mixed Applause appeared a useful filly, and was ridden into second place in the Cherry Hinton Stakes by Mercer. She was then made favourite for the Waterford Candelabra Stakes at Goodwood but was soundly beaten by her stable companion Formulate (ridden by Muis Roberts). Mercer had already won a small maiden on Formulate, and after Goodwood went on to ride her to victory in both the May Hill Stakes and the Hoover Fillies' Mile. Formulate ended up Cecil's top rated 2yo that year.

However the stable was endowed with a fine set of two-year-olds. An early winner at the end of May was Mr H J Joel's Mill Reef colt Main Reef. Mercer rode him to win his maiden debut at Sandown Park at the end of May, and then again to win the Chesham Stakes at Royal Ascot. He completed a quickfire hat-trick in early July when winning the July Stakes at Newmarket. He then took a break before reappearing at Newbury when winning the Mill Reef Stakes, later losing the race through disqualification. His season ended slightly disappointingly when beaten into fourth in the Middle Park Stakes. The next top two-year-old to come along was Lord Howard de Walden's colt Kris. Lord Howard had had horses both with Cecil and Murless, but up to this point the best horse Cecil had trained for him had been the gelding Fool's Mate, who was a tough handicapper. Kris took the relationship into another realm, but one could not have foretold this from Kris's early runs. Kris appeared first at Leicester in mid-June and won impressively at 6–1 on his 5furlong maiden debut. Although the press liked his performance, expectations were dampened when stable representative Paddy Rudkin said 'we have plenty better at home'. His next race was chosen to be a maidens-at-closing race at Folkestone in early July, which he again won well. Kris then suffered a slight setback and was not seen out again until mid-October when with a lot of stable confidence he won the 6 furlong Rockingham Stakes at York, coming away powerfully from his field to win by an impressive 4 lengths. Twelve days later he finished off his season when winning the Horris Hill Stakes at Newbury. Not as dominant as in his previous races as Mercer had to give him a harder race, it did show he was improving with each race.

The day after Kris won at Folkestone Mercer rode another fine colt on his debut at Yarmouth. This was Mr Carlo d'Alessio's Lyphard colt, Lyphard's Wish, and, odds on, he won this 7 furlong maiden well. In mid-July he similarly won his follow-up race the Limekiln Stakes. His third victory was most impressive when he won the Solario Stakes in a course-record time. His season ended with two defeats in the Royal Lodge Stakes and William Hill Futurity that showed him to be just below the best juveniles of that year. Mercer had an embarrassment of riches, as this colt was soon followed by Mr Charles St. George's colt R B Chesne. Mercer missed this colt's debut victory as he was under suspension, but rode him in an impressive Washington Singer Stakes victory at Newbury. He again rode him at Doncaster when favourite for the Champagne Stakes. R B Chesne won, but while beating More Light (Hern/Carson), veered off a straight line and made his task more difficult. His final race was as favourite for the Dewhurst Stakes in which he was soundly beaten and finished a disappointing 5th to Tromos. St George was lucky to have another promising two-year-old colt, Borzoi, who created a strong impression when winning his second race at Newmarket.

A new owner to the stable was Helena Springfield Limited who entered horseracing by purchasing three yearlings fillies at the 1977 Newmarket Sales. One was sent to be trained by Michael Stoute (Reprocolor)and the other two went into training with Cecil. Cecil's first runner for his new owner was Odeon, who finished second (ridden by Mercer) on her debut. Ridden by other jockeys, she then won her maiden before finishing second in the Hoover Fillies Mile to the Mercer ridden Formulate. In the same ownership, One in a Million was ridden in both her races by Mercer. She appeared at the end of September in the Blue Seal Stakes, which she won impressively. She then stepped up further when winning the Houghton Stakes at Newmarket, convincingly beating the highly rated, Hern trained colt Milford.

In midsummer Cecil's stable was endowed with a further owner under more peculiar circumstances. Mr Daniel Wildenstein, a rich Paris art dealer, had owned horses for many years and had won the 1976 One Thousand Guineas with Flying Water and the Oaks with Pawneese, both trained in France by Angel Penna. Penna had decided to retire and return to Argentina, and some horses were sent to be trained in England by Peter Walwyn. Some success was gained and more were sent in 1978, amongst them Wildenstein's prized stayer Buckskin. All seemed well but at that year's Royal Ascot Buckskin was well beaten by Shangamuzo in the Ascot Gold Cup. In the unsaddling enclosure Wildenstein complained about jockey Pat Eddery's riding of the horse and an argument ensued the result of which was that Walwyn asked Wildenstein to remove his horses from his stable. A few weeks later the announcement was made that these horses would be joining Cecil's Warren Place string. Mercer and Cecil's first runner and first winner for Wildenstein was the five-year-old horse Malecite, who won the Winter Hill Stakes at Windsor. This victory was swiftly followed by Southern Seas winning her maiden at Yarmouth: this three-year-old filly went on to win four races all ridden by Mercer. Many other races were won, none more important than Buckskin's victory in the Doncaster Cup. He followed up this victory with a sparkling victory in Jockey Club Cup at Newmarket. In both these victories Mercer chose to lead on this difficult to train five-year-old.

Despite not winning a classic race Henry Cecil regained the leading trainer title and won more races than any previous season, and Mercer rode 115 winners, his highest ever total for a British Flat Season.

1979 was no different from previous seasons and Mercer arrived at the season's first big meeting (Newmarket Craven Meeting) having ridden only three winners for long time stalwarts Harry Wragg, Jeremy Hindley and Peter Walwyn. The first day of this meeting was to see Cecil have his first runners. Mercer rode a treble on the first day, the most significant of which was Lyphard's Wish in the Craven Stakes. Pitted against the Two Thousand Guineas favourite (and the previous year's top two-year-old), Tromos, Mercer's mount was second favourite at 11–2. In a small field of three Mercer took the lead from the start and that there was to be an upset was never in doubt: Tromos the odds-on 30-100 favourite was beaten decisively by two and a half lengths. Later in the afternoon Mercer had another winner for Cecil, when Chalet won a handicap with top weight. The jockey's afternoon finished with a last gasp victory on Romara for Harry Wragg beating a hot favourite in Reprocolor (Helena Springfield's filly with Michael Stoute).

The next day Cecil introduced Welsh Chanter in the Wood Ditton Stakes (a race for hitherto unraced three-year-olds). Mercer thus rode his fourth winner of the meeting, and this colt later gave him a Royal Ascot winner in June, when winning the Britannia Stakes for his owner Jim Joel. Mercer's fifth winner of the meeting was One in a Million in the Nell Gwyn Stakes. Taking on the One Thousand Guineas favourite, Devon Ditty, she was made favourite and easily repaid her supporters with a most impressive victory. She immediately became the new Guineas favourite. One in a Million went on to win the Thousand Guineas in a race where Mercer took full control of the race by using his filly's speed to open up a large lead three furlongs out. As she tired coming up the final hill her lead was diminishing but this tactic enabled her to hold on by a length. The filly ran later at Royal Ascot and won the Coronation Stakes, but only on the disqualification of Buz Kashi. Her career ended when she could finish only third in the July Cup.

Following the Craven meeting, the stable then went to Newbury where Mercer rode two Wildenstein horses to win their maidens. But the highlight of a strong week for the stable was the seasonal debut of Kris in the Greenham Stakes. Mercer rode his typical race bringing Kris to hit the front at the distance. He then was strongly challenged by Young Generation who appeared certain to beat Kris. However this colt was not finished and he reasserted himself in the last hundred yards to win an exciting race by half a length. Soon after the race it was announced that Mercer was to ride Lord Howard de Walden's colt in the Two Thousand Guineas and the ride on Lyphard's Wish was to go to Yves Saint-Martin. What wasn't known was that Kris had overstretched and injured himself in the race and had to be handled carefully in order to be fit for his classic race.

Kris started as favourite for the Two Thousand Guineas and nearest to him in the betting were joint second favourites Young Generation and Kris's stable companion Lyphard's Wish. Mercer had chosen the right horse and the race seemed at his mercy with a furlong to go as he loomed up to challenge the leader Tap on Wood. But Kris did not fire as he did at Newbury and Tap on Wood held on to win by half a length with Young Generation only a short-head behind Kris.

Disappointed by this defeat Cecil felt Kris needed more experience and he was given an easy race at Kempton when Mercer rode him to win the Heron Stakes. At Royal Ascot Young Generation was expected to beat Kris and so started favourite for the St James Palace Stakes. Kris started as second favourite but now showed his true worth and confidently ridden by Mercer beat his old rival decisively by one and a half lengths. Ridden by Mercer Kris remained supreme amongst milers for the rest of the season winning the Sussex Stakes, Waterford Candelabra Stakes (Goodwood Mile), Queen Elizabeth II Stakes and finally the Challenge Stakes.

Kris was the third of Mercer's four Royal Ascot winners. The fourth was the Jeremy Hindley trained Rollahead who won the Windsor Castle Stakes. Cecil also had four winners but his fourth was a bitter-sweet victory in the Ascot Gold Cup involving the Daniel Wildenstein colt Buckskin. This six-year-old had reappeared on a wet day at Sandown in May and on the perfect (for him) going of soft ground had won the Henry II Stakes easily by 15 lengths. It was an impressive performance and despite an encouraging first win of the year on Le Moss Mercer chose to ride Buckskin in the Gold Cup (Lester Piggott took over from Mercer on Le Moss). For all of the race Buckskin was stalked by Le Moss but on the firmer ground was unable to shake off his younger stablemate. Coming into the straight Buckskin took over the lead but soon after Le Moss drew upsides and after a short battle Mercer accepted the situation and allowed Buckskin to come home 5 lengths ahead of Araphos (who was third), but 7 lengths behind Le Moss. For Cecil (who was visibly upset for his gallant horse) and Mercer the wrong horse had won. Buckskin was retired after this race. Le Moss went on to take the Stayer's Triple Crown when back in the hands of Mercer he won both the Goodwood Cup and Doncaster Cup.

Lyphard's Wish came out of his Two Thousand Guineas race well and reunited with Mercer led almost all the way to win the Dante Stakes at York. He was then to be aimed at the Derby. Mercer had already won the Lingfield Derby Trial on Milford (owned by the Queen) for Dick Hern, when he deputised for an injured Willie Carson. Piggott eventually took the ride on Milford in the Derby who was joint third favourite and preferred in the market to Lyphard's Wish. As it was Mercer was to lead most of the way in this 200th Derby, but his colt's stamina ran out at the 10 furlong pole and he gave way to Dickens Hill who eventually finished 4 lengths in front of the 5th finishing Mercer mount. But the whole field was massacred by Dick Hern's Troy as the Willie Carson ridden colt beat his field by 7 lengths. Milford finished unplaced as he did when Mercer ridden in the St Leger later in the year. Although Lyphard's Wish continued to run well in a number of Group 1 races he failed to add to his score. Mercer did ride him to be placed in three Group 1 races; the Prince of Wales Stakes, Benson and Hedges Gold Cup and Prix du Moulin.

Following Royal Ascot Mercer had a successful July in which he rode 29 winners, 16 of them for his retained stable. A feature of this hit-rate was five doubles and three trebles. In terms of big wins it was a lesser month and his biggest win was on Rollahead in the National Stakes. The biggest disappointment of the month was the total eclipse of Borzoi in the Eclipse. Mr Charles St George's colt had only reappeared in early June when he won the John of Gaunt Stakes under jockey Taffy Thomas. Reunited with Mercer he was strongly fancied for Royal Ascot's Jersey Stakes. His final race was a dismal effort in the Eclipse. St George did not have much luck with his older horses as R B Chesne was badly ill early in the year and appeared only once when second at Doncaster in September. Another 3yo to take his time to find his feet was Jim Joel's Main Reef. Seen as the stables' leading Derby horse he ran a disappointing couple of races early in the season in the Blue Riband Stakes at Epsom and then the Dee Stakes at Chester. However given a rest over the summer he reappeared in the Autumn and Mercer rode him to win the Crown of Crown Stakes at Goodwood followed by the Cumberland Lodge Stakes at Ascot.

If July was a strong month August was stronger and started with the important Goodwood Festival. Mercer rode seven winners and as well as the aforementioned victories on Le Moss and Kris, his most important success was on Connaught Bridge who won the Nassau Stakes. This filly had seemed well exposed as a two-year-old when she won twice at small meetings. Shed did not come to hand early as a three-year-old and missed the fillies classics. She eventually reappeared in early July running 3rd under jockey John Higgins. She then stepped up in class for this Nassau victory when ridden by Mercer to beat her stable companion Odeon (ridden by Piggott). Connaught Bridge next took the Yorkshire Oaks when Mercer rode her to a three length victory over Senorita Poquito and Reprocolor. She finished off her year with a storming victory in the Twickenham Fillies Stakes at Kempton, again Mercer ridden.

The leading filly at the start of the season had been Wildenstein's Li'Ile du Reve. This filly was beautifully bred being out of the Oaks winner Lupe. Unraced as a two-year-old she won her debut maiden and then easily scored in the Cheshire Oaks and was made favourite for The Oaks in which she was easily beaten. Although she ran again she could not be compared to Connaught Bridge or Odeon amongst the staying fillies in the stable.

On the same day that Kris won the Sussex Stakes, Mercer rode Jim Joel's The Solent to win the Goodwood Stakes (his third win of the season on this staying handicapper). The day after The Solent's win Mercer took the Lanson Champagne Stakes on Mr Louis Freedman's Marathon Gold, who at that time appeared the best two-year-old in the yard having won his first race convincingly at Ascot. As it was he was to disappoint thereafter and was replaced by more consistent and promising colts in the stable. Mercer drew a blank on the Friday of Goodwood but finished the meeting with a treble on the aforementioned Connaught Bridge, Suavity (an early 2yo colt who was winning his third race from three starts) and Tahitian King. Richard Baerlein in the Guardian commented on the Monday after Goodwood that "It certainly be a wonderful feat if at the age of 44, Joe Mercer could win his first jockey championship. I fear with his lowest riding weight of 8 st 4 lb it is simply not on unless Carson and Eddery are sidelined through accidents. At present Mercer leads with 86 winners from Carson with 82 and Eddery with 75".

By the end of the month he had ridden 31 winners in the month and 109 thus far for the season: a long way ahead of his previous scoring rate (even 1967). His chief pursuers were champion Willie Carson and Pat Eddery but Mercer's ten doubles and one treble in August kept Carson 10 to 20 winners behind. Important wins in the month (after Goodwood) were Piaffer (Rose of York Handicap), Odeon (Galtres Stakes), Connaught Bridge and Kris. In addition a promising two-year-old in the shape of Charles St George's Ginistrelli appeared at Yarmouth to win comfortably on his debut. Mercer missed this colt's second win a few weeks later as he was riding at another meeting.

Although he couldn't keep up this run-rate in September he still had 24 winners. At this time Cecil's stable was hit by the virus as reported by Mercer to Jonathan Powell in an article in the News of the World. This happened at a time Cecil was revealing his two-year-olds and trying himself to win the Trainer's Championship. He took steps to quarantine the sick horses.

Despite this Mercer had a brilliant spell mid-September when he won 8 races in three days; these included the consistent Volcanic (his third win), Le Moss (Doncaster Cup), Nocino (a 2yo of Daniel Wildesteins's in the Rous Nursery Handicap: Mercer's third win on this colt) and Kashmir Lass (a Louis Freedman 2yo) as well as winning rides for Bill Wightman, William Hastings-Bass and Charles Nelson. By the end of the Doncaster St Leger meeting Mercer was 3–1 on to win his first jockey championship. The month ended with another treble at Ascot when as well as winning on Kris, he took the Royal Lodge Stakes on Daniel Wildenstein's colt Hello Gorgeous and the Blue Seal Stakes (for the second year) on Lord Howard de Walden's promising filly Evita.

A feature of October was the number of wins on promising 2yo's. Although Super Asset was second first time out in September this Michael Riordan horse won 3 races in succession, including Hyperion Stakes and Horris Hill Stakes. Such was the impression this Sir Ivor colt made he was rated second only (one pound below) to the Dewhurst winner Monteverdi in the Two Year old Handicap for 1979. Hello Gorgeous was rated only two pounds lower after winning his final race the William Hill Futurity (previously the Timeform or Observer Gold Cup). This important win gave Mercer his 155th winner of the season. Another interesting colt to make his debut in the month was Jim Joel's Light Cavalry who provided Mercer with his 150th winner. October was a month in which Mercer rode 25 winners including 5 doubles, one treble and one four-timer.

In the article with Powell Mercer mentioned that he had never phoned around for rides, and even in pursuing his first title he had refused to but that many trainers were calling him. As he said "just recently a number of people I don’t normally ride for have been offering me mounts and "so many people have said they’d like to see me do it". In September and October Mercer rode winners for Cecil (27), Hindley (3), Reg Akehurst (1), Jeremy Tree (2), Mick Musson (1), Bill Wightman (2), Ron Smyth (1), William Hastings-Bass (1), Charles Nelson (2), Denys Smith (1), Neil Adam (1), Scobie Breasley (2), John Sutcliffe (2), John Tierney (1), Ryan Jarvis (1) and Andy Turnell (1).

Mercer did not slacken off right up to the end of the season. He only rode 6 winners in November but that was enough. He finished with doubles on the penultimate and final days of the season for his retained stable of Henry Cecil. Cecil finished Champion Trainer with a record of 128 winners and winnings of £683,971. Mercer finished with 164 winners beating his nearest rival Willie Carson by 22 winners. His percentage of winners to rides was a formidable 26.97%, so that he beat Carson who had 212 more rides than he did. Mercer was not the oldest winner, Richards had won at 48 and Scobie Breasley at 51, but he was the oldest first-time winner. In the New Year's Honours List, he was awarded an OBE.

=== 1980s ===
Numerically Mercer had his sixth best season in 1980 with 104 winners, but he slipped to fifth in that year's jockeys' table. However the season started well as usual at the Newmarket and Newbury Spring meetings. Biggest winner of the week was Evita, who won the accepted trial for the One Thousand Guineas, the Nell Gwynn Stakes. The Cecil stable was in a similar position to 1978 and had an unraced filly who was being touted as their best filly. Unlike Brigata, the Daniel Wildenstein owned Saison appeared at Newbury and won her maiden authoritatively, immediately being installed as favourite for the One Thousand Guineas, with Mercer to ride her (Pat Eddery took the ride on Evita). When it came to the big race itself, both fillies failed behind the winner, Quick as Lightning, and both failed to win again.

Cecil had no runner in the Two Thousand Guineas as the trialled colts failed to distinguish themselves and so on the day of that race was at Haydock to give Kris his seasonal debut in a relatively small race. Kris won his follow-up race, the Lockinge Stakes, at Newbury but soon after was injured and did not reappear again until early September when he won a small race at Goodwood. His final race, the Queen Elizabeth II Stakes, was a few weeks later and Kris had by then become difficult to train and difficult at the stalls. Covered in sweat he went down by a neck to that year's Two Thousand Guineas winner, Known Fact. His injury had caused him to miss all his midsummer races and meant that he didn't ever run over ten furlongs, which had been the aim of his third season in training.

Mercer again won the Dante Stakes, this time aboard Hello Gorgeous who went on to represent Mercer/Cecil in the Derby. Cecil's other Derby colt, Ginistrelli, had appeared in the Sandown Classic Trial in April and had won that race for Mercer. His next race was the Lingfield Derby Trial, in which he was totally eclipsed and didn't run again. Hello Gorgeous ran a similar race to the previous year's Derby runner Lyphard's Wish and faded in the last two furlongs. He was a good second in his next race, the Eclipse Stakes, to Ela-Mana-Mou but did not win again.

A more progressive colt was Light Cavalry, who won a handicap at Newbury mid-May, and then went on to win the King Edward VII Stakes at Royal Ascot. This was one of four Mercer victories at the Royal Meeting as he also won the Queen Mary Stakes on the speedy, Cecil trained Pushy (this filly later won the Cornwallis Stakes with Mercer riding) and the Ascot Gold Cup on Le Moss. Le Moss was also proving difficult to train and it was difficult to get him to exert himself on the gallops. There was no such problem in the race where Mercer took up the running a long way out and held off the strongly fancied Irish colt Ardross. For the second year running Le Moss completed the Stayer's Triple Crown beating Ardross in both the Goodwood Cup and the Doncaster Cup, despite having to give Ardross, the next year's Ascot Gold Cup winner and Prix de l'Arc de Triomphe second, weight in both races. Mercer completed a four-timer at Royal Ascot with his victory on John Sutcliffe's Tender Heart in the Royal Hunt Cup.

By mid-summer rumours as to who would ride for whom the following season were rife. It had been made known that Lester Piggott was severing his partnership with the Sangster- Magnier Vincent O’Brien stable at Ballydoyle and also Mercer had been told that Pat Eddery (Peter Walwyn's stable jockey) had been approached by representatives of Cecil's stable as to his availability the next season. Mercer met with Walwyn at a function at Walwyn's stable and said that he already knew that he would not be riding for one owner (Charles St. George) in 1981 and inquired as to Walwyn's plans as given that situation he would be willing to become Walwyn's stable jockey if he needed one. The result of all this was a switch round of stable jockeys in early September with Eddery becoming Vincent O’Brien's stable jockey, Piggott becoming Cecil's and Mercer at last becoming Peter Walwyn's. Walwyn had always expressed the opinion that Mercer was his 'beau ideal' as a stable jockey.

The announcement of this was made at the Doncaster St Leger meeting where Mercer rode St. George's Gielgud to victory in the Champagne Stakes. This colt was not Cecil's only good two-year-old colt as he had had Mercer also win the July Stakes on Age Quod Aegis for Wildenstein in July. On the Saturday of the Doncaster meeting Mercer chose to blunt the speed of his main rival Water Mill (Carson/Hern) in the St. Leger Stakes by leading from the start and ultimately winning the final classic by 4 lengths on Jim Joel's Light Cavalry.

In 1981 the strength of Peter Walwyn's stable could not compare with the powerful stable of the early-to-mid-1970s. Ravaged by the virus from 1978 onwards he had both lost owners and become second choice for others. Owners such as Stavros Niarchos had taken horses away from Walwyn at the end of 1979 (including Nureyev), while Louis Freedman and Lord Howard de Walden, who seemed to favour Walwyn earlier in the 1970s, now preferred to send their better animals to Henry Cecil. Walwyn did not have the calibre of horse of earlier years and won only one Group race in 1981 when Travel on won the Cherry Hinton Stakes at the Newmarket July meeting. Mercer's only other big winner for Walwyn was Halsbury, who Mercer rode to win the Cesarawitch Handicap at the end of the season.

Mercer had only 64 winning rides, but 1981 was not a complete write-off for Mercer. He benefitted from the misfortune of Willie Carson, who fractured his skull in a fall at the York August meeting. With no stable jockey Hern used several jockeys as replacements for Carson and often used Mercer. Although Mercer did not ride the Queen's Height of Fashion in her first race, when winning the Acomb Stakes at York (Piggott rode), he did ride her in her two other, both winning, runs: the last of which was the Fillies Mile at Ascot. Her second victory was in the May Hill Stakes at Doncaster and this formed the second leg of a memorable double. Earlier on the card Mercer rode the Sir John Astor owned Cut Above in the St. Leger for Hern. This was being treated as Hern's second string as Lester Piggott was riding Lady Beaverbrook's colt Bustomi, who was a shorter price. However the odds on favourite was the dual Derby winner Shergar who was confidently expected to take his second British Classic. On his 28-1 shot Mercer wound up a long run from four furlongs out and in the final furlong came away from his field with Gold and Ivory second, Bustomi third and the disappointing favourite Shergar a well-beaten fourth. Mercer also rode the Sobell/Weinstock colt Prince Bee for Hern to win the Valdoe Stakes at Goodwood and preferred this colt to Cut Above when Hern sent the two colts unsuccessfully for the Prix de l'Arc de Triomphe.

The following season was again tough for Mercer and other than winning the Cambridgeshire Handicap for Luca Cumani on Century City he had few winners of note and rode only 58 winners in the season. He did however look to have a fine chance of winning the Derby. Pat Eddery rode Jeremy Tree's Peacetime to win the Sandown Classic Trial. The colt had had breathing problems and an operation had seemed to cure those as he won well. As Eddery would ride for the O’Brien stable in the Derby, Mercer was engaged to take over and the partnership smoothly won the Predominate Stakes at Goodwood beating Touching Wood. In the Derby Mercer rode the classic race being in the first 4 coming into the straight and travelling as well as any other horse. However, when the pressure was applied Peacetime folded as if the breathing problems had returned. He was unplaced behind Golden Fleece with Touching Wood second.

1983 was a more interesting year and could have been even more important. Mid-season Mercer broke his own rule of not telephoning trainers to enquire as to possibility of a ride. Having been 'jocked off' earlier in his career he had stuck to this principle. The circumstances were that Billy Newnes the stable jockey to Derrick Candy's son Henry's stable had been injured on the gallops and was unable to ride the previous year's Oaks winner Time Charter in the King George VI and Queen Elizabeth Stakes at Ascot. Urged by his wife Mercer rang Henry Candy and was reunited with the Kingstone Warren stable. Mercer rode a perfect race on the filly and won his second King George from Diamond Shoal.

Later in the season he was to benefit from a dispute between Lester Piggott and Daniel Wildenstein. Wildenstein had been unhappy with Piggott's riding of his two-year-old colt Vacarme in the Richmond Stakes. Later when Piggott turned down the ride on his filly All Along (trained by Patrick Biancone) in the Prix de l'Arc de Triomphe he decided Piggott would never ride for him again. Mercer was offered the ride on All Along but turned it down as he had already been retained by Dick Hern to ride Sun Princess's pacemaker Sailor's Dance (Sobell/Weinstock). The ride went to Walter Swinburn who went on to win the Arc and three other Grade 1 races in North America on All Along. Despite this Wildenstein was impressed with Mercer's loyalty and Mercer rode most of the horses Cecil trained for Wildenstein for the rest of the season. Mercer rode the favourite Vacarme in the Middle Park Stakes but the colt was only a disappointing third. He did however ride the same owner's Legend of France to win the Joel Stakes. By now Mercer was often riding for Charles Nelson and rode a very promising filly called Mahogany to win the Rockfel Stakes, who became strongly fancied for the next year's One Thousand Guineas. This and Time Charter's win helped to make up for the low number of winners, 55, he rode that year.

The Spring Meeting week of 1984 was almost as it used to be and Mercer won the two main classic trials at Newbury when Mahogany won the Fred Darling Stakes and the same trainer's Creag an Sgor won the Greenham Stakes. Mahogany was made favourite for the One Thousand Guineas. Prominent for a long way in the big race she then faded badly as if there was something wrong with her. Creag an Sgor was outclassed in the Two Thousand Guineas.

Mercer retained the Wildenstein rides with Cecil and again won on Legend of France (Earl of Sefton Stakes). Soon after Mercer rode this colt as favourite at Royal Ascot and after a disappointing run there was an argument between Cecil and Wildenstein. Soon after Wildenstein removed his horses from Cecil's yard. The rides therefore dried up for Cecil. Mercer did reunite with Time Charter again but compared with the last year the results were not as positive. Billy Newnes had been suspended for the season and so Mercer was retained again, but before the filly's first race of the season he himself picked up a suspension and so missed both Time Charter's victory in the Coronation Cup at Epsom as well as his ride in the Epsom Derby, severing a run of more than 30 consecutive rides in the Epsom classic.

Time Charter's next race was the Eclipse Stakes for which she was favourite. Mercer held up the filly for her late finish but did not get a clear run and finished a fast finishing second to Sadler's Wells. He received some criticism for this performance but retained the ride on Time Charter for the King George VI and Queen Elizabeth Stakes. Time Charter was fifth behind Teenoso in this race and Mercer was not asked to ride her again in her remaining (unsuccessful) races. On King George day Mercer did have an interesting winner when Peter Walwyn's, two-year-old debutant, Khozaam won the Granville Stakes in impressive style. He followed this up with an equally impressive victory in the Washington Singer Stakes at Newbury. Khozaam finished off his season with a close second to Reach in the Royal Lodge Stakes, despite being hit over the head by Reach's jockey's whip. Mercer rode 49 winners in 1984.

Popular sentiment was that Mercer was continuing to ride because of the chance of Khozaam in the 1985 Derby, but the idea of this horse achieving that feat was soon erased as Khozaam ran poorly in the Blue Riband Stakes at Epsom in April. He failed again in the Lingfield Derby Trial and had not trained on and was a failure as a three-year-old. It was no surprise when Mercer decided to announce his retirement from the saddle in the middle of the Goodwood summer meeting. Mercer did ride several good winners in his last year, the most important of which were Walwyn two-year-olds. The best was Stalker who was consistent all year and won both the Gimcrack Stakes and the Middle Park Stakes, as well as two other races. This was Walwyn's first Group One victory since the late 70s. There was also a slower to mature two-year-old called Luqman, who Mercer rode to win four races, although he missed his biggest day when Luqman won the Mill Reef Stakes at Newbury, with Stalker (Mercer aboard) coming second. For Charles Nelson Mercer rode his only Royal Ascot winner on another two-year-old Marouble in the Norfolk Stakes.

The final day of the 1985 season was at Doncaster and this was to be Mercer's farewell to UK flat racing. Although he had a few rides his best chance of a win was presented to him by Jeremy Hindley and Michael Hills. Hills was to ride the favourite in a two-year-old race called Comme l'Etoile for his stable, but elected to step aside so Mercer could have a chance of riding a final winner for a stable he'd been long associated with. Mercer duly won on Comme l'Etoile. Later on the card, he rode a relatively unfancied colt called Bold Rex in the Manchester November Handicap. In very soft going Mercer kept this John Dunlop trained colt towards the rear but steered him up the centre of the course to win a final victory. The horse and jockey were cheered loudly all the way from the course to the unsaddling enclosure.

== Riding style ==
He was noted as a great stylist in the saddle. "Just watch carefully the next time Joe Mercer gets involved in a finish on television. In my carefully considered opinion, it is very hard indeed to believe that a more effective, more stylish or more aesthetically satisfying method exists of persuading a thoroughbred horse to go faster," wrote the journalist John Oaksey

== Legacy ==
Mercer's career total of 2,810 winners was exceeded only by Sir Gordon Richards, Lester Piggott and Doug Smith at the time of his retirement, and subsequently only bettered by Pat Eddery (his niece's ex-husband), Willie Carson and Frankie Dettori.

Shortly after his retirement, he was the subject of a biography by Richard Baerlein: Joe Mercer The Pictorial Biography Queen Ann Press (1987).

== Personal life ==
Mercer is survived by his wife, Deanna Anne Carr, the daughter of jockey Harry Carr. His older brother, Manny Mercer, was also a jockey and died in a racing accident in 1959. His niece, Carolyn, was married to jockey Pat Eddery.

Mercer was appointed an Officer of the Order of the British Empire (OBE) in the 1980 Birthday Honours.
