= Brian Taylor (jockey) =

British jockey (1939–1984)

Personal information
- Born: 6 July 1939 Southend-on-Sea, Essex, United Kingdom
- Died: 10 December 1984 (aged 45) Hong Kong
- Occupation: Jockey

Horse racing career
- Sport: Horse racing

Major racing wins
- British Classic Race wins as jockey: Epsom Derby (1)

Significant horses
- Snow Knight, Realm, Whitstead, Bay Express, Pelerin

Brian Taylor (戴萊) (6 July 1939 – 10 December 1984) was a successful British jockey in Thoroughbred horse racing best known for riding Snow Knight to victory in the 1974 Epsom Derby.

Taylor was born in Southend-on-Sea, in Essex, England. Among his other career wins were the Princess Margaret Stakes (1971), Cherry Hinton Stakes (1971), Cork and Orrery Stakes (1973), Earl of Sefton Stakes (1977), Sandown Classic Trial (1978), July Cup (1971), Derby Stakes (1974, on Snow Knight), John Porter Stakes (1981), Ormonde Stakes (1981), Craven Stakes (1983), and in France, the Prix Gontaut-Biron (1984).

While racing at the Sha Tin Racecourse in Hong Kong on 8 December 1984, his mount, Silver Star (銀星一號), stumbled, throwing him off his saddle while crossing the finish line. Taylor suffered serious neck and head injuries and died two days later in Hong Kong Sanatorium and Hospital.

Taylor had suffered from shingles however had recovered, his friend Bill Burnett wanted him to find someone else to replace him for that race in fact English Wally Hood offered to take the ride. At the last minute, however, he decided to do the race himself which turned out to be his last.

Less than 10 months before Taylor's fall, Silver Star also ended the career of another top jockey at the time, Frenchman Philippe Paquet, by throwing the jockey onto the sand track during morning training on 13 February 1984, in similar fashion. Paquet suffered a fractured skull and remained in a coma for more than three months before regaining consciousness.

Taylor is remembered for winning the Epsom Derby on 50/1 outsider Snow Knight, as well as for riding a total of 1,254 winners on British soil, including 108 in 1976, his best-ever season.
