= Ron Hutchinson (jockey) =

Australian jockey (born 1927)

Personal information
- Born: 14 December 1927 (age 98) Yarraville, Victoria, Australia
- Occupation: Jockey

Horse racing career
- Sport: Horse racing

Major racing wins
- British Classic Races: 1000 Guineas Stakes (1969); 2000 Guineas Stakes (1960); St Leger Stakes (1969); Other major races: Coronation Stakes (1968); Dewhurst Stakes (1965); Eclipse Stakes (1973); Gold Cup (1974); Goodwood Cup (1966); Irish 1,000 Guineas (1967, 1970, 1974); Irish Champion Stakes (1977); July Cup (1965, 1972); Lockinge Stakes (1968, 1969); Nunthorpe Stakes (1961); Observer Gold Cup (1965); Prince of Wales's Stakes (1971); Queen Anne Stakes (1971); Sussex Stakes (1963, 1965, 1966)

Racing awards
- Melbourne Jockeys' Premiership (1958-59); Singapore Jockeys' Premiership (1978)

Honours
- Australian Racing Hall of Fame (2005)

Significant horses
- Floribunda, Full Dress, Gaily, Habitat, Intermezzo, Martial, North Stoke, Pretendre, Queen's Hussar, Ragstone, Scottish Rifle, Sovereign
- Updated on 28 January 2022

Ron Hutchinson (born 14 December 1927) is a retired Australian jockey, who won over 1000 races in Europe. In a 37-year racing career, he was successful across three continents.

== Early life ==
Ronald Robert Hutchinson was born in Yarraville, eight kilometres outside Melbourne, to a plumber and a housewife. At the time, Yarraville was a heavily industrialised suburb which was struggling amid the Great Depression. He attended the Powell Street State School in the town.

He had no contact with horses as a young child, but became a fan of jockeys Harold Badger and Bill Duncan through reading about them in newspapers. He was also inspired by the 1938 film Stablemates and the horseracing newsreels shown before films at the local Sun Theatre where he worked selling sweets.

At school, he was asked to write an essay on what he wanted to be when he grew up and he chose to write about becoming a jockey. A woodwork teacher, who also gambled, knew the trainer Claude Goodfellow and introduced the young boy to him. Goodfellow had tutored champion jump jockey Laurie Meenan, Melbourne Cup winner Ossie Phillips, and Peter Simonds who had a 70-year riding and training career. He took Hutchinson on as apprentice. It helped that Hutchinson was very small, at the time just 157.5 cm. Hutchinson's parents actively discouraged him from pursuing a career in the sport, believing everyone involved to be crooks, although an uncle had a hairdressing salon opposite the stables at Flemington and would tell colourful stories about racing, which may have been a further influence on the boy. His father and uncle would later keep a scrapbook of his successes.

== Career ==
Hutchinson started work at Goodfellow's Ascot Vale stable at the age of 14 - he remembers it being on one of the days the Japanese bombed Darwin - and lived in the stable block. Every morning, he rode his bike from Ascot Vale to Glenroy to learn how to ride with Bobbie Lewis, an ex-Melbourne Cup winner. Goodfellow had a limited number of horses, and as part of the war effort, also worked a night job canning sausages for the soldiers, before arriving at the track at 4am. This limited good racing opportunities.

=== Early success ===
He did not have his first race ride until December 1944, but displayed a natural talent for riding and soon became a leading apprentice. His first winner, on his 12th ride, was a Busybody at the now defunct Mentone Racecourse and his first major success came quickly. After only three months, he won the Australian Cup on grey mare Spectre, trained by Cecil Godby. The day's race report commented on how Hutchinson "handled Spectre with excellent judgment". After the race, Hutchinson asked Goodfellow if he could go home and celebrate with his parents, but the trainer gave him some small change and told him to "go down to the shop and buy the Sporting Globe, go to bed and read about yourself". In his first eight months, he rode 12 winners and 26 placed horses from 160 rides.

Goodfellow was strict with Hutchinson. On one occasion, he forgot to bring some gear to the track and was banned from riding at the next meeting. He was told to ring the trainers who had already booked him and tell them he wouldn't be riding. Goodfellow would also vet the girls he chose to go out with. Hutchinson would be an apprentice with him until he was 21.

That first Australian Cup in 1945 was the first of 60 Cup winners he would ride in Australia. After becoming a senior jockey in the 1949–50 season, he won the Coongy Handicap and Moonee Valley Cup on top stayer Hoyle, then a second Australian Cup. In 1953, he won another Australian Cup on the three-year-old Arbroath, who won the VRC St Leger, Cup and Carbine Stakes in the space of eight days.

Throughout the 1950s, he was one of Australia's leading riders and won the Melbourne jockeys' premiership in 1958–59. He had wins in the Newmarket Handicap, Futurity Stakes, Metropolitan Handicap, VRC Oaks and Doomben Cup. One of his other key associations was three times Victorian champion trainer Lou Robertson.

=== Move to Europe ===
By the late 1950s, he had won most of Australia's major races. Inspired by his idol and compatriot, Scobie Breasley, who had done similarly a few years earlier, he relocated to Europe in search of further success. He was one of several jockeys who did likewise, including Bill Williamson and Jack Purtell. Hutchinson had watched and learned from Breasley at Flemington Racecourse as an apprentice. He said he "worshipped" him, often trying to copy his dress sense. Eventually, they ended up meeting, and became friends.

He moved first to Ireland to work for Paddy Prendergast and on his first ride in England won the 2000 Guineas riding Prendergast's Marshall He then gained a retainer from the Duke of Norfolk and would become the Duke's stable jockey for 16 years. During his time in Europe, he won over 1000 races, including the Ascot Gold Cup, Goodwood Cup, St Leger, 1000 Guineas, 2000 Guineas, Irish 1000 Guineas (three times), and an Irish 2000 Guineas, as well as riding Sheikh Mohammed's first winner.

He concluded his career with a year in Malaysia and Singapore, where he won the 1978 jockeys' premiership. His intention had been to retire before that, but on a cross-Atlantic flight he called into Singapore and visited the racecourse. He won nine races in four days and was invited to stay for the season.

After retirement as a jockey, he was an investor in the Lindsay Park training centre of Colin Hayes, trained horses and acted as racing manager for an American billionaire.

Hutchinson was inducted into the Australian Racing Hall of Fame in 2005 and now lives in Mornington, Victoria, swimming a kilometre most days in his 90s.

== Riding style ==
Hutchinson's style has been described as "vigorous, well-balanced and close to the horse's neck and withers to save wind resistance." As a youngster, Claude Goodfellow told him to "keep a 'Jim Pike' hollow in his back and one day he would be at the top of the tree". He became "world renowned for his skill on the racetrack".

== Personal life ==
Hutchinson married Norma Gum, of Sunshine, Victoria, at the Sunshine Presbyterian Church on 23 April 1953. The two met at a social gathering. Before they started dating, his trainer Claude Goodfellow had taken her out for a drive to see if he approved of her and came back saying "she's a good girl". Norma was not interested in racing and newspapers ran the story of their marriage with the headline "Ron marries a non-bettor". The groomsman at the wedding was fellow jockey Bill Williamson who at the time had a two win lead over Hutchinson in the jockeys' premiership and went on to win it.

He had four children with Norma - Raymond, Susan, Sally and Peter. Both Raymond and Peter worked in the racing industry. Raymond used to exercise horses at Scobie Breasley's yard in Epsom, and was leading amateur rider in England for four years before graduating in veterinary science at the University of London. Peter was apprentice to Colin Hayes and became premier jockey in Adelaide in 1989-90 and 91 before moving to Melbourne. He won the 1993 Caulfield Cup on Fraar.

== Major wins ==
(United Kingdom) Great Britain

- 1000 Guineas Stakes - Full Dress (1969)
- 2000 Guineas Stakes - Martial (1960)
- Coronation Stakes - Sovereign (1968)
- Dewhurst Stakes - Pretendre (1965)
- Eclipse Stakes - Scottish Rifle (1973)
- Gold Cup - Ragstone (1974)
- Goodwood Cup - Gaulois (1966)
- July Cup - (2) - Merry Madcap (1965), Parsimony (1972)
- Lockinge Stakes - (2) - Supreme Sovereign (1968), Habitat (1969)
- Nunthorpe Stakes - Floribunda (1961)
- Observer Gold Cup - Pretendre (1965)
- Prince of Wales's Stakes - Arthur (1971)
- Queen Anne Stakes - Roi Soleil (1971)
- St Leger Stakes - Intermezzo (1969)
- Sussex Stakes - (3) - Queen's Hussar (1963), Carlemont (1965), Paveh (1966)

(Republic of Ireland) Ireland

- Irish 1,000 Guineas - (3) - Lacquer (1967), Black Satin (1970), Gaily (1974)
- Irish Champion Stakes - North Stoke (1977)

== See also ==
- List of jockeys
