= Diamondsandrubies =

Irish-bred Thoroughbred racehorse

- Sire: Fastnet Rock
- Grandsire: Danehill
- Dam: Quarter Moon
- Damsire: Sadler's Wells
- Sex: Mare
- Foaled: 30 April 2012
- Country: Ireland
- Colour: Bay
- Breeder: Premier Bloodstock
- Owner: Roisin Henry and Susan Magnier
- Trainer: Aidan O'Brien
- Record: 9: 3-0-1
- Earnings: £172,998

Major wins
- Cheshire Oaks (2015); Pretty Polly Stakes (2015)

Diamondsandrubies (foaled 30 April 2012) is an Irish Thoroughbred racehorse and broodmare. After failing to win on her only start as a two-year-old in 2014 she improved to become a top-class performer in the following year. She won a minor race on her seasonal debut and went on to win the Cheshire Oaks before finishing an unlucky fourth in the Epsom Oaks. She recorded her biggest success on her next start when she took the Group 1 Pretty Polly Stakes, but failed to reproduce that form in three subsequent races and was retired from the track at the end of the year.

== Background ==
Diamondsandrubies is a bay mare with a white star bred in Ireland by Premier Bloodstock, a breeding company owned by John Magnier of the Coolmore Stud and Richard Henry. During her racing career she was owned by Susan Magnier and Richard Henry's wife Roisin and was trained at Ballydoyle by Aidan O'Brien. She was ridden in six of her nine races by Seamie Heffernan.

Her sire, the Australian stallion Fastnet Rock, was a sprinter whose victories included the Lightning Stakes and the Oakleigh Plate. He sired many leading horses including Shoals and Atlantic Jewel in the Southern hemisphere before moving to the Coolmore Stud in Ireland. His European progeny have included Fascinating Rock and Qualify. Diamondsandrubies' dam Quarter Moon was a top-class racemare who won the Moyglare Stud Stakes and finished second in the Irish 1000 Guineas, Epsom Oaks and Irish Oaks. Quarter Moon's dam Jude showed little ability as a racehorse, failing to win in four starts before being sold to Premier Bloodstock for 92,000 guineas as a three-year-old. She made more impact as a broodmare, with her other foals including Yesterday and All My Loving (third in the Epsom Oaks). Jude's dam Alruccaba was an influential broodmare whose other descendants have included Alborada, Allegretto (Prix Royal Oak), Aussie Rules (Poule d'Essai des Poulains) and Albanova (Preis von Europa).

== Racing career ==
=== 2014: two-year-old season ===
Diamondsandrubies made her first and only appearance as a two-year-old in a maiden race over seven furlongs on good to firm ground at Leopardstown Racecourse on 13 September. Starting a 22/1 outsider she made steady progress without ever looking likely to win and came home sixth of the thirteen runners, just over nine lengths behind the winner Tamadhor.

=== 2015: three-year-old season ===
On her three-year-old debut Diamondsandrubies started the 6/1 third choice in the betting for a nine furlong maiden on soft ground at Tipperary Racecourse on 9 April. With Heffernan in the saddle she raced in third place before taking the lead a furlong out and drew away to win by two and quarter lengths from the favourite Chinese Light with a gap of more than seven lengths back to Mohini in third. Nine days later the filly was moved up in class and distance for the Listed Salsabil Stakes over ten furlongs at Naas Racecourse and was made the 5/2 joint-favourite alongside the Jessica Harrington-trained Bocca Baciata. After being hampered two furlongs from the finish she kept on well in the closing stages to take third place behind Bocca Baciata and Pleascach. Ryan Moore took the mount when Diamondsandrubies was sent to England on 6 May to contest the Cheshire Oaks over eleven and a half furlongs at Chester Racecourse. Starting the 5/4 against nine British-trained opponents she tracked the front-running Sweet Dream before accelerating into the lead a furlong out and pulling clear to win by six lengths from the John Gosden-trained Entertainment. Ryan Moore commented "When I asked her, she quickened like a smart filly. For a big filly, she's gone round there very easily."

On 5 June Diamondsandrubies of the eleven fillies to contest the 237th running of the Oaks Stakes over one and a half miles at Epsom Racecourse. She appeared to be closing on the leaders when she was badly hampered a furlong out and although she rallied "gamely" in the closing stages to finish fourth behind Qualify, Legatissimo and Lady of Dubai. Twenty-three days later the filly was dropped back to ten furlongs and was matched against older fillies and mare in the Group 1 Pretty Polly Stakes at the Curragh. Legatissimo started favourite ahead of Pleascach while the other six runners included Brooch (Lanwades Stud Stakes), Ribbons (Prix Jean Romanet) and Secret Gesture (Middleton Stakes). Starting at odds of 8/1 Diamondsandrubies was sent into the lead by Heffernan after a furlong and was never headed thereafter. She was strongly challenged by Legatissimo in the final strides but held on under pressure to win by a short head with Ribbons a neck away in third. Heffernan commented: "Sometimes Epsom finishes a horse and sometimes the good horses thrive on it. She's obviously good. We thought she'd stay and I jumped and she landed in front and I was happy enough to go along with it. I knew they were coming. I knew where the line was. I was a bit unlucky at Epsom. Aidan trains them to progress from run to run and today she was at her best, so hopefully there will be more improvement."

Diamondsandrubies was made second favourite for the Nassau Stakes at Goodwood Racecourse but never looked like winning and finished last of the nine runners behind Legatissimo. The filly was sent to France in autumn for two races at Longchamp Racecourse but had no success. In the Prix Vermeille in September she came home eighth behind Treve beaten more than seventeen lengths by the winner. Three weeks later she ended her track career by running unplaced behind Covert Love in the Prix de l'Opéra.

== Pedigree ==
Pedigree of Diamondsandrubies (IRE), bay mare, 2012
Sire Fastnet Rock (AUS) 2001	Danehill (USA); 1986	Danzig	Northern Dancer (CAN)
Sire Fastnet Rock (AUS) 2001	Danehill (USA); 1986	Danzig	Pas de Nom
Sire Fastnet Rock (AUS) 2001	Danehill (USA); 1986	Razvana	His Majesty
Sire Fastnet Rock (AUS) 2001	Danehill (USA); 1986	Razvana	Spring Adieu (CAN)
Sire Fastnet Rock (AUS) 2001	Piccadilly Circus (AUS); 1995	Royal Academy (USA)	Nijinsky (CAN)
Sire Fastnet Rock (AUS) 2001	Piccadilly Circus (AUS); 1995	Royal Academy (USA)	Crimson Saint
Sire Fastnet Rock (AUS) 2001	Piccadilly Circus (AUS); 1995	Gatana	Marauding (NZ)
Sire Fastnet Rock (AUS) 2001	Piccadilly Circus (AUS); 1995	Gatana	Twigalae
Dam Quarter Moon (IRE) 1999	Sadler's Wells (USA); 1981	Northern Dancer (CAN)	Nearctic
Dam Quarter Moon (IRE) 1999	Sadler's Wells (USA); 1981	Northern Dancer (CAN)	Natalma (USA)
Dam Quarter Moon (IRE) 1999	Sadler's Wells (USA); 1981	Fairy Bridge	Bold Reason
Dam Quarter Moon (IRE) 1999	Sadler's Wells (USA); 1981	Fairy Bridge	Special
Dam Quarter Moon (IRE) 1999	Jude (GB); 1994	Darshaan (GB)	Shirley Heights
Dam Quarter Moon (IRE) 1999	Jude (GB); 1994	Darshaan (GB)	Delsy (FR)
Dam Quarter Moon (IRE) 1999	Jude (GB); 1994	Alruccaba (IRE)	Crystal Palace (FR)
Dam Quarter Moon (IRE) 1999	Jude (GB); 1994	Alruccaba (IRE)	Allara (GB) (Family: 9-c)

- Diamondsandrubies was inbred 3 × 4 to Northern Dancer, meaning that this stallion appears in both the third and fourth generations of her pedigree.
