= 2002 1000 Guineas =

189th 1000 Guineas Stakes
- 1000 Guineas
- Location: Newmarket Racecourse
- Date: 5 May 2002
- Winning horse: Kazzia (GER)
- Jockey: Frankie Dettori
- Trainer: Saeed bin Suroor (GB)
- Owner: Godolphin

The 2002 1000 Guineas Stakes was a horse race held at Newmarket Racecourse on Sunday 5 May 2002. It was the 189th running of the 1000 Guineas.

The winner was Godolphin's Kazzia, a German-bred brown filly trained at Newmarket, Suffolk by Saeed bin Suroor and ridden by Frankie Dettori. Kazzia's victory was the second in the race for her owner, trainer and jockey after the success of Cape Verdi in 1998. Godolphin's leader Sheikh Mohammed had previously won the race with Oh So Sharp in 1985 and Musical Bliss in 1989. Kazzia was the first German-bred horse to win a British Classic.

== The contenders ==
The race attracted a field of seventeen runners, thirteen trained in the United Kingdom and four in Ireland: there were no challengers from continental Europe. The favourite was the Luca Cumani-trained Gossamer who had won the Prestige Stakes and the Fillies' Mile in 2001. The four Irish challengers, all trained by Aidan O'Brien at Ballydoyle were Quarter Moon, winner of the Moyglare Stud Stakes, Lahinch, the winner of the Leopardstown 1,000 Guineas Trial Stakes and the maiden race winners Maryinsky and Pietra Dura. The Godolphin stable was represented by Kazzia, who had not raced since winning the Premio Dormello at Milan in October 2001. Apart from Gossamer, the best of the British-trained runners appeared to be the Nell Gwyn Stakes winner Misterah, the Prix Marcel Boussac winner Sulk and the Michael Stoute-trained Alasha. A notable absentee was Queen's Logic who had been favourite for the race before sustaining an injury. Gossamer headed the betting at odds of 11/8 ahead of Alasha (6/1), Misterah (7/1), Maryinsky (8/1) and Quarter Moon (9/1).

== The race ==
Shortly after the start the fillies formed a single group racing down the stands side (the left side from the jockeys' viewpoint) of the wide Newmarket straight. Kazzia and Roundtree both started quickly, but Lahinch gained the advantage in the early stages and set the pace. Lahinch and Kazzia disputed the lead for most of the way, with Alasha, Maryinsky and Misterah following and the favourite Gossamer restrained at the back of the field. Inside the final quarter-mile Kazzia took the lead from Lahinch as the blinkered outsider Snowfire began to make rapid progress. In the closing stages Kazzia held off the challenges of Snowfire on her right and Alasha on her left to win by a neck and half a length, with the 66/1 shot Dolores taking fourth place ahead of Quarter Moon, Misterah and Lahinch. Gossamer finished eighth after struggling to obtain a clear run and stumbling a furlong from the finish.

After the race, the winning jockey Frankie Dettori said that the filly had done very well, particularly as she was essentially a stayer- "She really wants more than a mile."

== Race details ==
- Sponsor: Sagitta
- First prize: £174,000
- Surface: Turf
- Going: Good to Firm
- Distance: 8 furlongs
- Number of runners: 17
- Winner's time: 1:37.85

== Full result ==
Pos.	Marg.	Horse (bred)	Jockey	Trainer (Country)	Odds
1		Kazzia (GER)	Frankie Dettori	Saeed bin Suroor (GB)	14/1
2	nk	Snowfire (GB)	Pat Eddery	John Dunlop (GB)	28/1
3	nk	Alasha (IRE)	Johnny Murtagh	Michael Stoute (GB)	6/1
4	½	Dolores (GB)	Richard Quinn	Amanda Perrett (GB)	66/1
5	½	Quarter Moon (IRE)	Mick Kinane	Aidan O'Brien (IRE)	9/1
6	1¼	Misterah (GB)	Richard Hills	Marcus Tregoning (GB)	7/1
7	nk	Lahinch (IRE)	P J Scallan	Aidan O'Brien (IRE)	33/1
8	2	Gossamer (GB)	Jamie Spencer	Luca Cumani (GB)	11/8 fav
9	1¼	Maryinsky (IRE)	Kieren Fallon	Aidan O'Brien (IRE)	8/1
10	shd	Shiny (GB)	Philip Robinson	Clive Brittain (GB)	66/1
11	½	Roundtree (IRE)	Richard Hughes	Richard Hannon, Sr. (GB)	16/1
12	1½	Sulk (IRE)	Olivier Peslier	John Gosden (GB)	16/1
13	½	Sosumi (GB)	Ted Durcan	Mark Tompkins (GB)	100/1
14	½	Hiddendale (IRE)	Willie Supple	Brian Meehan (GB)	40/1
15	6	Pietra Dura (GB)	George Duffield	Aidan O'Brien (IRE)	14/1
16	1¾	Ya Hajar (GB)	Steve Drowne	Mick Channon (GB)	66/1
17	8	Xtrasensory (GB)	Darryll Holland	Richard Hannon, Sr. (GB)	100/1

- Abbreviations: nse = nose; nk = neck; shd = head; hd = head; dist = distance; UR = unseated rider; DSQ = disqualified; PU = pulled up

== Winner's details ==
Further details of the winner, Kazzia

- Foaled: 12 April 1999
- Country: Germany
- Sire: Zinaad; Dam: Khoruna (Lagunas)
- Owner: Godolphin
- Breeder: R Grunewald
