= Gossamer (horse) =

British-bred Thoroughbred racehorse

- Sire: Sadler's Wells
- Grandsire: Northern Dancer
- Dam: Brocade
- Damsire: Habitat
- Sex: Mare
- Foaled: 20 February 1999
- Country: United Kingdom
- Colour: Bay
- Breeder: Gerald Leigh
- Owner: Gerald Leigh; The Leigh Family
- Trainer: Luca Cumani
- Record: 8: 4-0-1
- Earnings: £323,352

Major wins
- Prestige Stakes (2001); Fillies' Mile (2001); Irish 1,000 Guineas (2002)

Gossamer (foaled 20 February 1999) is a British thoroughbred racehorse and broodmare. In a racing career which lasted from July 2001 until October 2002 she won four of her eight starts and was one of the best fillies of her generation in Europe at both two and three years of age. As a juvenile she was undefeated in three starts, following up a win in a maiden race with victories in the Group Three Prestige Stakes and the Group One Fillies' Mile. Despite fears that her diminutive stature made her unlikely to improve as a three-year-old, and a defeat when favourite the 1000 Guineas she recovered to record an emphatic success in the Irish 1,000 Guineas. The best of her three subsequent appearances came when she finished third to the colt Rock of Gibraltar in the Prix du Moulin. Since her retirement from racing she has become a successful broodmare.

== Background ==
Gossamer is a small bay mare with a white star and a white sock on her right hind foot bred by Gerald Leigh who operated a small but successful breeding operation at his Eydon Hall Farm in Northamptonshire. She was one of the fourteenth crop of foals sired by Sadler's Wells, who won the Irish 2,000 Guineas, Eclipse Stakes and Irish Champion Stakes in 1984 went on to be the Champion sire on fourteen occasions. Her dam Brocade was a top-class racemare whose wins included the Prix de la Forêt. As a broodmare, Brocade also produced Gossamer's full brother Barathea and the Summer Stakes winner Free at Last.

The filly was sent into training with Luca Cumani at Newmarket, Suffolk and was ridden in all of her races by Jamie Spencer. She was an unusually small Thoroughbred: horse blankets designed for standard-sized horses trailed below her knees and some commentators described her as "pony-sized" and doubted that she would ever make a top-class racehorse.

== Racing career ==
=== 2001: two-year-old season ===
During the 2001 season, Gerald Leigh, who was suffering from cancer, donated all of the prize money won by his horses to the charity Cancerbacup. On her racecourse debut, Gossamer was one of eleven fillies to contest a six-furlong maiden race at Newmarket Racecourse on 12 July. Starting at odds of 12/1, she started slowly but took the lead inside the final furlong and won by a length from Karamah with the favoured Ya Hajar three lengths away in third place. On 26 August, the filly was stepped up in class for the Group Three Prestige Stakes over seven furlongs at Goodwood Racecourse and started 5/4 favourite against five opponents, headed by the John Dunlop-trained Kootenay. After settling the filly in fifth place, Spencer moved her forward to take the lead a quarter of a mile from the finish. In the closing stages, Gossamer accelerated away from her rivals and won in "impressive" style by seven lengths from Protectorate with Kootenay in third.

Gossamer was moved up in class and distance for her final start of the year, the Group One Fillies' Mile at Ascot Racecourse on 29 September. She started 4/6 favourite ahead of the May Hill Stakes winner Half Glance, whilst the other five runners included the Irish challenger Maryinsky, the Ed Dunlop-trained Fraulein and the highly regarded maiden winner Esloob. Gossamer raced behind the leaders as Esloob set the pace, before being switched to the outside in the straight. She took the lead approaching the final furlong and stayed on to win by two and a half lengths from Maryinsky, with Esloob a length and a quarter back in third place. After the race, the filly was made 2/1 ante-post favourite for the following year's 1000 Guineas. Cumani commented, "I've won this race twice before, but I can say I haven't had a filly as exciting as this in 25 years' training."

=== 2002: three-year-old season ===
For her first appearance of the 2002 season, Gossamer was sent directly to contest the 189th running of the 1000 Guineas over the Rowley Mile at Newmarket on 5 May, after Cumani opted not to run in any of the recognised trial races. Commenting on his decision the trainer said that "[Gossamer] is easy to get fit. And you are not really conceding an advantage by going straight there... It's more or less a level playing field." She started the 11/8 favourite but started slowly, struggled to obtain a clear run and stumbled approaching the final furlong before finishing eighth of the seventeen runners behind Kazzia. Three weeks later Gossamer was sent to Ireland for the Irish 1000 Guineas on heavy ground at the Curragh and was made the 4/1 favourite ahead of Alasha and Quarter Moon, both of whom had finished ahead of her at Newmarket. The rest of the fifteen runner field included Zenda, Rum Charger (Athasi Stakes), Saranac Lake (Debutante Stakes), Red Rioja (C L Weld Park Stakes) and Marionnuad (Leopardstown 1,000 Guineas Trial Stakes). Spencer tracked the leaders as the outsider Alstermeria made the running before moving the filly up to dispute the lead with Starbourne a furlong from the finish. In the closing stages Gossamer drew away from the field and won by four and a half lengths from Quarter Moon with Starbourne and Alstemeria in third and fourth. After the race Spencer said "I was never worried from the moment I hit the gate", and added "this filly is special. If I get a wife like her, I'll be happy!". Cumani commented "She has no quirks, a wonderful temperament, and is a perfect racing machine. I am glad she has silenced the doubters and there will be improvement to come".

The ground was much firmer when Gossamer returned to England for the Coronation Stakes at Royal Ascot on 21 June. She started the 6/4 favourite but never looked likely to win at any stage and finished last of the eleven runners behind Sophisticat. Gerald Leigh died in July 2002 and the ownership of Gossamer passed to "The Leigh Family" for her last two races. On 8 September the filly was matched against colts and older horses when she was sent to France for the Group One Prix du Moulin over 1600 metres at Longchamp Racecourse. She started the 18.4/1 outsider of the seven runners but stayed on strongly in the closing stages to take third place behind Rock of Gibraltar and Banks Hill. On her final appearance Gossamer was sent to Chicago for the fourth running of the Breeders' Cup Filly & Mare Turf over ten furlongs at Arlington Park on 26 October. She stayed on in the straight without challenging the leaders and finished fifth behind Starine, Banks Hill, Islington and Golden Apples.

== Breeding record ==
At the end of her racing career, Gossamer was retired to become a broodmare, and produced one foal for the Leigh Family before being acquired by Sheikh Mohammed's Darley Stud. She produced at least ten foals and seven winners:

- So Silk, a bay filly, foaled in 2004, sired by Rainbow Quest. Unraced. Dam of Silk Sari (Park Hill Stakes).
- Ibn Khaldun, chestnut colt, 2005, by Dubai Destination. Won four races including the Racing Post Trophy.
- Veil of Silence, bay filly, 2006, by Elusive Quality. Unraced.
- Memory Cloth, bay colt (later gelded), 2007, by Cape Cross. Won six races.
- Calico Cat, bay colt (later gelded), 2008, by Tiger Hill. Won one race.
- My Destination, bay colt (later gelded), 2009, by Dubai Destination. Won one race.
- Gossiping, bay colt (later gelded), 2012, by Dubawi. Won ten races.
- Silk Words, bay filly, 2013, by Dubawi. Won two races.
- Spring Mist, bay filly, 2014, by Dansili. Won two races.
- Finespun, bay filly, 2016, by Sea the Stars. Failed to win in six races. Dam of Saba Desert (Superlative Stakes).

== Pedigree ==
Pedigree of Gossamer (GB), bay mare, 1999
Sire Sadler's Wells (USA) 1981	Northern Dancer; 1961	Nearctic	Nearco
Sire Sadler's Wells (USA) 1981	Northern Dancer; 1961	Nearctic	Lady Angels
Sire Sadler's Wells (USA) 1981	Northern Dancer; 1961	Natalma	Native Dancer
Sire Sadler's Wells (USA) 1981	Northern Dancer; 1961	Natalma	Almahmoud
Sire Sadler's Wells (USA) 1981	Fairy Bridge; 1975	Bold Reason	Hail To Reason
Sire Sadler's Wells (USA) 1981	Fairy Bridge; 1975	Bold Reason	Lalun
Sire Sadler's Wells (USA) 1981	Fairy Bridge; 1975	Special	Forli
Sire Sadler's Wells (USA) 1981	Fairy Bridge; 1975	Special	Thong
Dam Brocade (GB) 1981	Habitat; 1966	Sir Gaylord	Turn-To
Dam Brocade (GB) 1981	Habitat; 1966	Sir Gaylord	Somethingroyal
Dam Brocade (GB) 1981	Habitat; 1966	Little Hut	Occupy
Dam Brocade (GB) 1981	Habitat; 1966	Little Hut	Savage Beauty
Dam Brocade (GB) 1981	Canton Silk; 1970	Runnymede	Petition
Dam Brocade (GB) 1981	Canton Silk; 1970	Runnymede	Dutch Clover
Dam Brocade (GB) 1981	Canton Silk; 1970	Clouded Lamp	Nimbus
Dam Brocade (GB) 1981	Canton Silk; 1970	Clouded Lamp	Kepwick (Family: 14-a)
