= Ibn Khaldun (horse) =

American-bred Thoroughbred racehorse

- Sire: Dubai Destination
- Grandsire: Kingmambo
- Dam: Gossamer
- Damsire: Sadler's Wells
- Sex: Stallion
- Foaled: 14 February 2005
- Country: United States
- Colour: Chestnut
- Breeder: Darley Stud
- Owner: Godolphin
- Trainer: Saeed bin Suroor; Mahmood Al Zarooni
- Record: 8: 4-0-0
- Earnings: £147,169

Major wins
- Autumn Stakes (2007); Racing Post Trophy (2007)

Ibn Khaldun (foaled 14 February 2005) was an American-bred Thoroughbred racehorse bred and owned by Mohammed bin Rashid Al Maktoum. He had his greatest success racing as a two-year-old in Britain in 2007 when he won four consecutive races including the Autumn Stakes and the Racing Post Trophy. He was strongly fancied for the following year's 2000 Guineas but ran poorly in the race. After a long absence he returned to the track in Dubai as a five-year-old but was well beaten in both his races.

== Background ==
Ibn Khaldun is a chestnut horse with a narrow white blaze and a long white sock on his left hind leg, bred in Kentucky by his owner, Sheikh Mohammed's Darley Stud. He was from the first crop of foals sired by Dubai Destination whose biggest win came in the 2003 Queen Anne Stakes. His other offspring have included Top Trip (Prix Hocquart), Family One (Prix Robert Papin) and Fleche d'Or the dam Golden Horn. Ibn Khaldun's dam Gossamer was a top-class racemare whose wins included the Fillies' Mile and the Irish 1,000 Guineas. Gossamer's dam, the Prix de la Forêt winner Brocade also produced Gossamer's full brother Barathea and the Summer Stakes winner Free at Last.

Ibn Khaldun raced in the colours of Sheikh Mohammed's Godolphin stable and was sent into training with Saeed bin Suroor. The horse was named after a fourteenth century Muslim historian.

== Racing career ==
=== 2007: two-year-old season ===
Ibn Khaldun made his racecourse debut in a six furlong maiden race at Yarmouth Racecourse on 26 August in which he started at odds of 100/30 in a twelve-runner field. Ridden by Ted Durcan he was unable to recover from a slow start and finished fourth behind the Michael Jarvis-trained Ancien Regime. Frankie Dettori took over the ride when the colt started 4/9 favourite for a similar event over seven furlongs at Leicester Racecourse sixteen days later. After being restrained by Dettori in the early stages he took the lead a furlong out and won by one and a quarter lengths despite being eased down in the final strides. On 30 September at Ascot Racecourse Ibn Khaldun was assigned a weight of 130 pounds in a seven furlong nursery handicap and started 9/4 favourite against fourteen opponents. He was held up by Dettori in the early stages before taking the lead approaching the final furlong and winning "readily" by two lengths from Hurricane Hymnbook. The colt was then moved up in class and started 4/7 favourite for the Group Three Autumn Stakes over one mile at Ascot on 13 October. After racing at the rear of the eight-runner field until the last quarter mile he took the lead inside the furlong and won by a length from the Richard Hannon-trained Redolent.

Ibn Khaldun was expected to run in the Breeders' Cup Juvenile Turf at Monmouth Park but was rerouted to the Group One Racing Post Trophy over one mile at Doncaster Racecourse on 27 October. Commenting on the decision to stay in Europe, Godolphin's racing manager Simon Crisford explained that the colt was "progressive, very much so, but perhaps not mentally ready for a trip like that". With Dettori riding in the United States, Godolphin's second jockey Kerrin McEvoy agreed to fly back from Australia to take the ride. Ibn Khaldun was made the 11/4 favourite ahead of the Irish challengers Curtain Call (winner of the Beresford Stakes) and Frozen Fire whilst the other nine runners included City Leader (Royal Lodge Stakes), River Proud (Somerville Tattersall Stakes) and Declaration of War. Ibn Khaldun recovered from being slightly hampered at the start and settled behind the leaders as River Proud set the early pace. City Leader gained the advantage a quarter of a mile out, but Ibn Khaldun took the lead approaching the final furlong and drew away to win by three lengths despite drifting to the right in the closing stages. After the race McEvoy said "I've got rid of the jet lag now! It's my first Group One of the year so I'm really happy. They went a nice tempo and he has obviously improved with every start. I'm just lucky that Frankie was in America and I was here to do the steering".

In the official International Classification for 2007, Ibn Khaldun was given a rating of 117, making him the eighth best colt of his generation in Europe.

=== 2008: three-year-old season ===
Ibn Khaldun spent the winter at Godolphin's Al Quoz training facility in Dubai. In a press conference in March 2008 Crisford reported "Ibn Khaldun is a fantastic colt, he's looking very strong, he's had an excellent winter and he's been working very, very well".

On his three-year-old debut Ibn Khaldun contested the 2000 Guineas over the Rowley Mile course at Newmarket Racecourse on 3 May. Partnered by Dettori he was made the 7/2 second favourite behind New Approach in a field of fifteen three-year-old colts. He was among the leaders in the early stages but began to struggle a quarter of a mile from the finish and dropped from contention to finish fifth behind Henrythenavigator.

=== 2010: five-year-old season ===
After an absence of almost two years, Ibn Khaldun returned to the track as a five-year-old in 2010, by which time Mahmood Al Zarooni had taken over as his trainer. He made two appearances on turf at Meydan Racecourse but never recovered his old form, finishing unplaced in the Al Fahidi Fort in February and eighth of twelve behind Presvis in the Jebel Hatta in March.

Ibn Khaldun never raced again and there appears to be no record of him standing as a breeding stallion.

== Pedigree ==
Pedigree of Ibn Khaldun (USA), chestnut stallion, 2005
Sire Dubai Destination (USA) 1999	Kingmambo (USA); 1990	Mr. Prospector	Raise a Native
Sire Dubai Destination (USA) 1999	Kingmambo (USA); 1990	Mr. Prospector	Gold Digger
Sire Dubai Destination (USA) 1999	Kingmambo (USA); 1990	Miesque	Nureyev
Sire Dubai Destination (USA) 1999	Kingmambo (USA); 1990	Miesque	Pasadoble
Sire Dubai Destination (USA) 1999	Mysterial (USA); 1994	Alleged	Hoist The Flag
Sire Dubai Destination (USA) 1999	Mysterial (USA); 1994	Alleged	Princess Pout
Sire Dubai Destination (USA) 1999	Mysterial (USA); 1994	Mysteries	Seattle Slew
Sire Dubai Destination (USA) 1999	Mysterial (USA); 1994	Mysteries	Phydilla
Dam Gossamer (GB) 1999	Sadler's Wells (USA); 1981	Northern Dancer	Nearctic
Dam Gossamer (GB) 1999	Sadler's Wells (USA); 1981	Northern Dancer	Natalma
Dam Gossamer (GB) 1999	Sadler's Wells (USA); 1981	Fairy Bridge	Bold Reason
Dam Gossamer (GB) 1999	Sadler's Wells (USA); 1981	Fairy Bridge	Special
Dam Gossamer (GB) 1999	Brocade (GB); 1981	Habitat	Sir Gaylord
Dam Gossamer (GB) 1999	Brocade (GB); 1981	Habitat	Little Hut
Dam Gossamer (GB) 1999	Brocade (GB); 1981	Canton Silk	Runnymede
Dam Gossamer (GB) 1999	Brocade (GB); 1981	Canton Silk	Clouded Lamp (Family: 14-a)
