= Galileo Chrome =

Irish Thoroughbred racehorse

- Racing silks of Galileo Chrome Partnership
- Sire: Australia
- Grandsire: Galileo
- Dam: Curious Mind
- Damsire: Dansili
- Sex: Colt
- Foaled: 28 April 2017
- Country: Ireland
- Colour: Bay
- Breeder: Mohamed Ali Meddeb
- Owner: Mohamed Ali Meddeb; Galileo Chrome Partnership
- Trainer: Joseph Patrick O'Brien
- Record: 5: 4-0-0
- Earnings: £241,066

Major wins
- Yeats Stakes (2020); St Leger Stakes (2020)

Galileo Chrome (foaled 28 April 2017) is an Irish Thoroughbred racehorse. He finished unplaced on his only start as a juvenile in 2019 but made rapid improvement in the following year, winning all four of his races including the Yeats Stakes and the St Leger Stakes

== Background ==
Galileo Chrome is a bay horse with no white markings bred in Ireland by his owner Mohamed Ali Meddeb. As a yearling he was put up for auction at the Goffs Orby sale but failed to reach his reserve price. He was sent into training with Joseph Patrick O'Brien at Owning Hill, County Kilkenny.

He was from the second crop of foals sired by Australia who won the Derby, Irish Derby and International Stakes in 2014. Galileo Chrome's dam Curious Mind showed little ability on the track, winning on her debut but finishing last in her only other start. She was a great-granddaughter of the Irish broodmare Alruccaba whose other descendants have included Yesterday, Quarter Moon, Alborada, Allegretto (Prix Royal Oak), Aussie Rules (Poule d'Essai des Poulains) and Albanova (Preis von Europa).

== Racing career ==
=== 2019: two-year-old season ===
Galileo Chrome began his racing career in a maiden race over one mile at Leopardstown Racecourse on 19 October. Ridden by the apprentice jockey Shane Crosse he started at odds of 33/1 and finished fifth of the thirteen runners, eight and a half lengths behind the winner Celtic High King.

=== 2020: three-year-old season ===
The 2020 flat racing season in Great Britain and Ireland was disrupted by the COVID-19 pandemic and Galileo Chrome did not reappear until 12 June when he started the 4/1 second favourite behind Serpentine for a ten furlong maiden at the Curragh. Ridden by Shane Crosse he raced just behind the leaders before finishing strongly and gaining the advantage in the final strides to win by a head from King of the Throne. Crosse was again in the saddle when the colt started odds-on favourite for a minor race over the same distance at Leopardstown on 31 July and won "easily" by six lengths from five opponents. Galileo Chrome was then stepped up in class and distance for the Listed Yeats Stakes over thirteen furlongs at Naas Racecourse on 29 August and started the 2/1 favourite in a seven-runner field. Ridden by Crosse (who was no longer an apprentice), he went to the front inside the last quarter mile and recorded another easy win, coming hime five lengths clear of Emperor of the Sun.

The 244th running of the St Leger took place behind closed doors over 14 1/2 furlongs at Doncaster Racecourse on 12 September and Galileo Chrome, ridden by Tom Marquand, started the 4/1 third favourite behind the Irish Derby winner Santiago and Hukum (Geoffrey Freer Stakes) while the best fancied of the other eight contenders were Pyledriver (Great Voltigeur Stakes) and Subjectivist (March Stakes). Marquand had been scheduled to ride English King until that colt was redirected to contest the Grand Prix de Paris on the following day, but when Crosse was forced to self-isolate after a positive COVID test he stepped in to take the ride. After racing in mid-division, Galileo Chrome gained the advantage approaching the final furlong and held off a sustained challenge from Berkshire Rocco to win by a neck.

== Stud career ==
Galileo Chrome was retired from racing after his win in the St Leger. He began his career as a breeding stallion at the Starfield Stud in County Westmeath where he was marketed as a National Hunt sire.

== Pedigree ==
Pedigree of Galileo Chrome (IRE), bay colt, 2017
Sire Australia (IRE) 2011	Galileo (IRE); 1998	Sadler's Wells (USA)	Northern Dancer (CAN)
Sire Australia (IRE) 2011	Galileo (IRE); 1998	Sadler's Wells (USA)	Fairy Bridge
Sire Australia (IRE) 2011	Galileo (IRE); 1998	Urban Sea (USA)	Miswaki
Sire Australia (IRE) 2011	Galileo (IRE); 1998	Urban Sea (USA)	Allegretta (GB)
Sire Australia (IRE) 2011	Ouija Board (GB); 2001	Cape Cross (IRE)	Green Desert (USA)
Sire Australia (IRE) 2011	Ouija Board (GB); 2001	Cape Cross (IRE)	Park Appeal
Sire Australia (IRE) 2011	Ouija Board (GB); 2001	Selection Board	Welsh Pageant (FR)
Sire Australia (IRE) 2011	Ouija Board (GB); 2001	Selection Board	Ouija
Dam Curious Mind (GB) 2010	Dansili (GB); 1996	Danehill (USA)	Danzig
Dam Curious Mind (GB) 2010	Dansili (GB); 1996	Danehill (USA)	Razyana
Dam Curious Mind (GB) 2010	Dansili (GB); 1996	Hasili (IRE)	Kahyasi
Dam Curious Mind (GB) 2010	Dansili (GB); 1996	Hasili (IRE)	Kerali (GB)
Dam Curious Mind (GB) 2010	Intrigued (GB); 2002	Darshaan	Shirley Heights
Dam Curious Mind (GB) 2010	Intrigued (GB); 2002	Darshaan	Delsy (FR)
Dam Curious Mind (GB) 2010	Intrigued (GB); 2002	Last Second (IRE)	Alzao (USA)
Dam Curious Mind (GB) 2010	Intrigued (GB); 2002	Last Second (IRE)	Alruccaba (Family: 9-c)
