= Quarter Moon =

Irish-bred Thoroughbred racehorse

- Sire: Sadler's Wells
- Grandsire: Northern Dancer
- Dam: Jude
- Damsire: Darshaan
- Sex: Mare
- Foaled: 31 January 1999
- Country: Ireland
- Colour: Bay
- Breeder: Premier Bloodstock
- Owner: Roisin Henry & Susan Magnier
- Trainer: Aidan O'Brien
- Record: 9: 1-4-1
- Earnings: £309,084

Major wins
- Moyglare Stud Stakes (2001)

Quarter Moon (foaled 31 January 1999) was an Irish Thoroughbred racehorse and broodmare. As a two-year-old in 2001 she showed considerable promise, taking the Group 1 Moyglare Stud Stakes on the second of her two starts. In the following year she failed to win but showed top class form to finish second in four Group 1 races: the Irish 1,000 Guineas, the Epsom Oaks, the Irish Oaks and the Nassau Stakes. After retiring from racing at the end of the year she became a successful broodmare whose foals have included the Pretty Polly Stakes winner Diamondsandrubies.

== Background ==
Quarter Moon is a bay mare with no white markings bred in Ireland by Premier Bloodstock, a breeding company owned by John Magnier of the Coolmore Stud and Richard Henry. During her racing career she was owned by Susan Magnier and Richard Henry's wife Roisin and was trained at Ballydoyle by Aidan O'Brien. She was ridden in all of her races by Mick Kinane.

She was from the fourteenth crop of foals sired by Sadler's Wells, who won the Irish 2000 Guineas, Eclipse Stakes and Irish Champion Stakes in 1984 went on to be the Champion sire on fourteen occasions. Quarter Moon's dam Jude showed little ability as a racehorse, failing to win in four starts before being sold to Premier Bloodstock for 92,000 guineas as a three-year-old. She made more impact as a broodmare, with her other foals including Yesterday and All My Loving (third in the Epsom Oaks). Jude's dam Alruccaba was an influential broodmare whose other descendants have included Alborada, Allegretto (Prix Royal Oak), Aussie Rules (Poule d'Essai des Poulains) and Albanova (Preis von Europa).

== Racing career ==
=== 2001: two-year-old season ===
Rather than making her first appearance in a maiden race Quarter Moon made her track debut in the Group 3 Debutante Stakes over seven furlongs on soft ground at the Curragh on 19 August. Starting at odds of 5/1 she was restrained in the early stages before producing a strong late run and failing by only a head to overhaul the Dermot Weld-trained favourite Saranac Lake. Two weeks later the filly was stepped up to Group 1 class and started the 7/4 favourite for the Moyglare Stud Stakes over the same course and distance. Her sixteen opponents included Sophisticat (also trained by O'Brien), Seba (winner of the Chesham Stakes), Dress To Thrill (Tyros Stakes), High Society (Rochestown Stakes), Mahsusie (Marble Hill Stakes) and Miss Beabea (runner-up in the Phoenix Stakes). Kinane restrained the favourite in the early stages as the O'Brien-trained outsider Ardara set the pace, but made a forward move a quarter of a mile from the finish. Quarter Moon took the lead inside the final furlong and won by three quarters of a length and a neck from Dress To Thrill and Sophisticat. Aidan O'Brien commented "Quarter Moon has always looked special and is in all the top fillies races later this year. She looks a real prospect for next season".

=== 2002: three-year-old season ===
Quarter Moon began her second campaign in the 189th running of the 1000 Guineas over the Rowley Mile at Newmarket on 5 May and started the 9/1 fifth choice in the betting. After pulling hard in the early stages she kept on well in the last quarter mile and finished fifth of the seventeen runners, less than two lengths behind the winner Kazzia. In the Irish 1000 Guineas three weeks later the filly was beaten into second by the British-trained Gossamer after coming from ninth place three furlongs out. Quarter Moon was then moved up in distance for the Epsom Oaks over one and a half miles on unusually soft ground on 7 June and started 15/2 fourth favourite behind Kazzia, Islington and Mellow Park. After racing towards the rear of the fourteen-runner field as Kazzia set the pace, before moving up to join the leader in the straight. The two fillies drew away from the others in the last quarter mile with Quarter Moon eventually going down to the favourite by half a length. There was a gap of more than fourteen lengths back to Shadow Dancing in third. The Guardian reported that she deserved "immense credit" for her performance. The Daily Telegraph's correspondent commented that she was "gallant in defeat", pointing out that she had been running on less favourable ground than the winner, who had raced up the stands side rail.

On 14 July at the Curragh Quarter Moon started the 4/5 favourite for the Irish Oaks but after taking the lead in the straight she was overtaken inside the final furlong and beaten a length by the 33/1 outsider Margarula. The filly was then brought back in distance for the Nassau Stakes over ten furlongs at Goodwood Racecourse on 3 August and started favourite. She appeared to be "reluctant" before the race and finished third of the ten runners behind Islington and Sulk. She failed to produce her best form in the Yorkshire Oaks later that month and came home sixth of the eleven runners behind Islington. On her final appearance she was sent to France to contest the Prix de l'Opéra over 2000 metres at Longchamp Racecourse on 6 October and finished unplaced in a race won by Bright Sky.

== Breeding record ==
Quarter Moon was retired from racing to become a broodmare for Premier Bloodstock. She has produced eleven foals and six winners:

- Moonless Night, a bay colt (later gelded), foaled in 2004, sired by Danehill. Unraced.
- King of Westphalia, bay colt, 2005, by Kingmambo. Won one race.
- Born To Be King, bay colt, 2006, by Storm Cat. Won one race.
- You'll Be Mine, bay filly, 2007, by Kingmambo. Won one race. Dam of Eminent (Prix Guillaume d'Ornano).
- October, bay colt, 2008, by Kingmambo. Exported to stand as a breeding stallion in Poland.
- Consistory, bay colt (gelded), 2009, by Smart Strike. Unraced.
- Half Moon, bay filly, 2010, by Duke of Marmalade. Failed to win in four races.
- Dance With Another, bay filly, 2011, by Danehill Dancer. Won one race.
- Diamondsandrubies, bay filly, 2012, by Fastnet Rock. Won three races including Pretty Polly Stakes and Cheshire Oaks.
- How High the Moon, bay filly, 2013, by Fastnet Rock. Won one race.
- Great Seal, colt 2015, by War Front

== Pedigree ==
Pedigree of Quarter Moon (IRE) bay mare 1999
| Sire Sadler's Wells (USA) 1981 | Northern Dancer (CAN); 1961 | Nearctic | Nearco |
| Sire Sadler's Wells (USA) 1981 | Northern Dancer (CAN); 1961 | Nearctic | Lady Angela |
| Sire Sadler's Wells (USA) 1981 | Northern Dancer (CAN); 1961 | Natalma | Native Dancer |
| Sire Sadler's Wells (USA) 1981 | Northern Dancer (CAN); 1961 | Natalma | Almahmoud |
| Sire Sadler's Wells (USA) 1981 | Fairy Bridge (USA). 1975 | Bold Reason | Hail to Reason |
| Sire Sadler's Wells (USA) 1981 | Fairy Bridge (USA). 1975 | Bold Reason | Lalun |
| Sire Sadler's Wells (USA) 1981 | Fairy Bridge (USA). 1975 | Special | Forli |
| Sire Sadler's Wells (USA) 1981 | Fairy Bridge (USA). 1975 | Special | Thong |
| Dam Jude (GB) 1994 | Darshaan (GB); 1981 | Shirley Heights | Mill Reef |
| Dam Jude (GB) 1994 | Darshaan (GB); 1981 | Shirley Heights | Hardiemma |
| Dam Jude (GB) 1994 | Darshaan (GB); 1981 | Delsy | Abdos |
| Dam Jude (GB) 1994 | Darshaan (GB); 1981 | Delsy | Kelty |
| Dam Jude (GB) 1994 | Alruccaba (IRE); 1983 | Crystal Palace | Caro |
| Dam Jude (GB) 1994 | Alruccaba (IRE); 1983 | Crystal Palace | Hermieres |
| Dam Jude (GB) 1994 | Alruccaba (IRE); 1983 | Allara | Zeddaan |
| Dam Jude (GB) 1994 | Alruccaba (IRE); 1983 | Allara | Nucciolina (family: 9-c) |
