= 2003 1000 Guineas =

190th 1000 Guineas Stakes
- 1000 Guineas
- Location: Newmarket Racecourse
- Date: 4 May 2003
- Winning horse: Russian Rhythm (US)
- Jockey: Kieren Fallon
- Trainer: Michael Stoute (GB)
- Owner: Cheveley Park Stud

The 2003 1000 Guineas Stakes was a horse race held at Newmarket Racecourse on Sunday 4 May 2003. It was the 190th running of the 1000 Guineas.

The winner was the Cheveley Park Stud's Russian Rhythm, a Pennsylvania-bred chestnut filly trained in Newmarket, Suffolk by Michael Stoute and ridden by Kieren Fallon. Russian Rhythm's victory was the first in the race for her owner, the second for Stoute after Musical Bliss (1989) and the third for Fallon after Sleepytime (1997) and Wince (1999).

== The contenders ==
The race attracted a field of nineteen runners, fifteen trained in the United Kingdom, two in Ireland and two in France. The favourite was the French filly Six Perfections who had been named European Champion Two-year old Filly in 2002 when she had won the Prix du Calvados and the Group One Prix Marcel Boussac. On her three-year-old debut she had won the Prix Imprudence at Maisons-Laffitte Racecourse in April. The other French challenger was the André Fabre-trained Intercontinental, winner of three of her four races. Ireland was represented by two runners from the Ballydoyle stable of Aidan O'Brien: Yesterday, who went on to win the Irish 1000 Guineas, and L'Ancresse, the runner-up in the Leopardstown 1,000 Guineas Trial Stakes. The Godolphin stable fielded Mezzo Soprano and Gonfilia, who had finished first and second in the UAE 1000 Guineas. The leading British-trained contender was the undefeated Soviet Song, winner of the Sweet Solera Stakes and Fillies' Mile. Other challengers included Russian Rhythm (Princess Margaret Stakes, Lowther Stakes, Cheveley Park Stakes), Tante Rose (Fred Darling Stakes) and Khulood (Nell Gwyn Stakes). Russian Rhythm had been joint-favourite for the race before performing poorly in training gallops. Six Perfections headed the betting at odds of 7/4 ahead of Soviet Song (4/1), Intercontinental (5/1), Mezzo Soprano (7/1) and Russian Rhythm (12/1).

== The race ==
Shortly after the start, most of the fillies moved to the stands side of the wide Newmarket straight (the left side of the course from the jockey's point of view) and Hector's Girl set the pace from Khulood. Other horses racing prominently in the early stages were Yesterday, Casual Look, Summitville, Duty Paid, L'Ancresse, Mezzo Soprano and Gonfilia whilst most of the leading fancies were restrained towards the back of the field. Gonfilia moved into the lead approaching the final quarter-mile at which point there was a good deal of bunching and scrimmaging, with several runners being badly hampered. Thulliez was forced to switch the favourite Six Perfections to the wide outside. Intercontinental gained the advantage approaching the final furlong but was soon challenged by Russian Rhythm with Soviet Song close behind and Six Perfections making rapid progress. Russian Rhythm took the lead just inside the final furlong and stayed on to win by one and a half lengths from the fast-finishing Six Perfections, with Intercontinental taking third ahead of Soviet Song and the 50/1 outsider Hanami. Casual Look, later to win the Oaks Stakes, stayed on to take sixth ahead of Summitville and Yesterday.

After the race Russian Rhythm's trainer Michael Stoute said: "I really had not been pleased with her preparation. Kieren was a little bit more confident than I was, but fortunately she has come right on the day. That was a high-class performance. Maybe she was just kidding me at home. I was just reporting honestly, but the public probably think I conned them".

== Race details ==
- Sponsor: Sagitta
- First prize: £185,600
- Surface: Turf
- Going: Good to Firm
- Distance: 8 furlongs
- Number of runners: 19
- Winner's time: 1:38.43

== Full result ==
Pos.	Marg.	Horse (bred)	Jockey	Trainer (Country)	Odds
1		Russian Rhythm (US)	Kieren Fallon	Michael Stoute (GB)	12/1
2	1½	Six Perfections (FR)	Thierry Thulliez	Pascal Bary (FR)	7/4 fav
3	1¼	Intercontinental (GB)	Christophe Soumillon	André Fabre (FR)	5/1
4	1½	Soviet Song (IRE)	Oscar Urbina	James Fanshawe (GB)	4/1
5	nk	Hanami (GB)	Darryll Holland	James Toller (GB)	50/1
6	hd	Casual Look (US)	Martin Dwyer	Andrew Balding (GB)	50/1
7	1¼	Summitville (GB)	Micky Fenton	James Given (GB)	66/1
8	1	Yesterday (IRE)	Mick Kinane	Aidan O'Brien (IRE)	20/1
9	nk	Presto Vento (GB)	Pat Eddery	Richard Hannon, Sr. (GB)	150/1
10	2	Duty Paid (IRE)	Richard Quinn	David Elsworth (GB)	50/1
11	5	Look Here's Carol (IRE)	Graham Gibbons	Brian McMahon (GB)	150/1
12	½	Gonfilia (GER)	Jamie Spencer	Saeed bin Suroor (GB)	20/1
13	5	Spinola (FR)	Eddie Ahern	Peter Harris (GB)	100/1
14	hd	Mezzo Soprano (US)	Frankie Dettori	Saeed bin Suroor (GB)	7/1
15	¾	L'Ancresse (IRE)	Kevin Darley	Aidan O'Brien (IRE)	50/1
16	1¼	Tante Rose (GB)	Michael Hills	Barry Hills (GB)	14/1
17	7	Wimple (US)	Philip Robinson	Clive Brittain (GB)	200/1
18	½	Hector's Girl (GB)	Jimmy Fortune	Michael Stoute (GB)	16/1
19	3½	Khulood (GB)	Willie Supple	John Dunlop (GB)	16/1

- Abbreviations: nse = nose; nk = neck; shd = head; hd = head; dist = distance; UR = unseated rider; DSQ = disqualified; PU = pulled up

== Winner's details ==
Further details of the winner, Russian Rhythm

- Foaled: 12 February 2000
- Country: United States (Pennsylvania)
- Sire: Kingmambo; Dam: Balistroika (Nijinsky)
- Owner: Cheveley Park Stud
- Breeder: Brushwood Stable
