= Sophisticat =

American-bred Thoroughbred racehorse

- Sire: Storm Cat
- Grandsire: Storm Bird
- Dam: Serena's Song
- Damsire: Rahy
- Sex: Mare
- Foaled: 25 January 1999
- Country: United States
- Colour: Bay or Brown
- Breeder: Robert and Beverly Lewis
- Owner: Michael Tabor & Susan Magnier
- Trainer: Aidan O'Brien
- Record: 12: 3-5-2
- Earnings: £301,556

Major wins
- Prix de la Grotte (2002); Coronation Stakes (2002)

Sophisticat (foaled 25 January 1999) was a Kentucky-bred, Irish-trained Thoroughbred racehorse and broodmare. A daughter of Storm Cat out of the champion filly Serena's Song she was sold for $3.7 million as a yearling and raced in Europe for the Coolmore Stud organization. Racing as a two-year-old, she won only one minor race but was placed in the Queen Mary Stakes, Silver Flash Stakes, Lowther Stakes, Moyglare Stud Stakes and Cheveley Park Stakes. In the following year she won the Prix de la Grotte and finished second in the Poule d'Essai des Pouliches before recording her biggest success in the Coronation Stakes at Royal Ascot. She was retired at the end of the year and had some success as a broodmare.

== Background ==
Sophisticat was a dark bay or brown mare bred in Kentucky by Robert and Beverly Lewis. She was sired by Storm Cat, a high-class racehorse who won the Young America Stakes and finished second in the Breeders' Cup Juvenile in 1985. He went on to become an exceptionally successful breeding stallion, and was the Leading sire in North America in 1999 and 2000. The best of his progeny included Aljabr, Bluegrass Cat, Cat Thief, Forestry, Giant's Causeway, Hold That Tiger, Jalil, Life Is Sweet, One Cool Cat, Storm Flag Flying and Tabasco Cat. Sophisticat was the second foal of her dam Serena's Song an outstanding racemare who won eleven Grade I races and was voted American Champion Three-Year-Old Filly in 1995.

In July, the yearling filly was consigned by the Lewises to the Keeneland sale and was bought for $3.4 million by the bloodstock agent Dermot "Demi" O'Byrne, acting on behalf of John Magnier's Coolmore organisation. She was sent to Europe and entered training with Aidan O'Brien at Ballydoyle. Like many Coolmore horses, the details of Sophisticat's ownership varied for race to race: she was sometimes listed as the property of Michael Tabor, whilst on others she was described as being owned in partnership by Tabor and Susan Magnier. She was ridden in nine of her twelve races by Mick Kinane.

== Racing career ==
=== 2001: two-year-old season ===
Sophisticat began her racing career in a five furlong maiden race at Leopardstown Racecourse on 13 May in which she was ridden by Colm O'Donoghue and finished second to High Society. On 4 June the filly was moved up in distance for a six furlong maiden at Naas Racecourse. She started the 2/7 and won "comfortably" by four lengths from Real Delight and eight others.

Sophisticat failed to win again in six attempts in the rest of 2001 but was placed in several major races. In June she was sent to England to contest the five furlong Queen Mary Stakes at Royal Ascot and finished second of the twenty runners, half a lengths behind the winner Queen's Logic. In July she started 1/3 favourite for the Silver Flash Stakes at Leopardstown but was beaten a length by the Dermot Weld-trained Agnetha after failing to obtain a clear run in the straight. Kinane's performance on the filly resulted in a two-day suspension for careless riding. In August she returned to England and faced Queen's Logic and the Cherry Hinton Stakes winner Silent Honor in the Lowther Stakes at York Racecourse. She took the lead approaching the final furlong but was overtaken by Queen's Logic in the closing stages and finished second again, one and a quarter lengths behind the winner. Ten days later she was moved up in distance for the Group One Moyglare Stud Stakes over seven furlongs at the Curragh in which she was ridden by Seamie Heffernan, with Kinane riding her more fancied stablemate Quarter Moon. Sophisticat took the lead a quarter of a mile from the finish but was overtaken in the final furlong and finished third behind Quarter Moon and Dressed To Thrill.

On her last European appearance of 2001, Sophisticat started second favourite behind Queen's Logic in the Group One Cheveley Park Stakes at Newmarket Racecourse on 2 October. After being restrained by Kinane in the early stages she moved up into second place behind the favourite in the last quarter mile but could make no impression on the British and finished second, beaten seven lengths. In November Sophisticat was sent to the United States to contest the Breeders' Cup Juvenile Fillies over eight and a half furlongs at Belmont Park. Racing on dirt for the first time, she finished fifth of the nine runners, six lengths behind the winner Tempera and one place ahead of Take Charge Lady.

=== 2002: three-year-old season ===
On her three-year-old debut, Sophisticat was sent to France and started 9/5 favourite for the Group Three Prix de la Grotte over 1600 metres at Longchamp Racecourse. Ridden by Jamie Spencer, she was restrained at the back of the six-runner field until the last 300 metres. She was then switched to the outside, took the lead 100 metres from the finish and won by three quarters of a length and half a lengths from Dublino and Firth of Lorne. Aidan O'Brien commented "she did it very sweetly". A month later, Sophisticat returned to France for the Poule d'Essai des Pouliches over the same course and distance. Starting at odds of 13.6/1 in a seventeen-runner field she turned into the straight in ninth place before making steady progress to finish third behind the John Gosden-trained Zenda and the favourite Firth of Lorne.

Sophisticat faced Zenda again in the Coronation Stakes at Royal Ascot and started the 11/2 third choice in the betting. The favourite was the Luca Cumani-trained Gossamer, whose wins included the Fillies' Mile and the Irish 1000 Guineas, whilst the other contenders included Dolores (fourth in the 1000 Guineas) and Misterah (Nell Gwyn Stakes). Racing on good to firm ground she was held up towards the rear of the field before making progress in the straight, but failed to obtain a clear run when Kinane attempted to make a challenge along the inside. When she was switched to the outside with a furlong to run she accelerated strongly, overtook Zenda in the final strides and on by a neck. Dolores finished two and a half lengths back in third ahead of Misterah. O'Brien commented "Sophisticat has an unbelievable amount of pace and when Mick got clear she really flew. She has been very unlucky as things have to go her way - she is a brilliant filly but she has plenty of attitude. She kept meeting Queen's Logic last year when circumstances did not work in her favour but she is a filly with an awful lot of ability".

On her final appearance, Sophisticat started 3/1 second favourite for the Matron Stakes on 7 September at Leopardstown in which she was matched against older fillies and mares. Despite being accompanied by two stablemates who acted as pacemakers, she never looked likely to win and finished sixth of the nine runners behind Dressed To Thrill. After the race she was reported to be in "respiratory distress".

== Breeding record ==
At the end of her racing career, Sophisticat was retired to become a broodmare for Coolmore's Pacelco branch. She has produced seven foals and three winners:

- Suppose, a bay filly, foaled in 2004, sired by Danehill. Failed to win in four races.
- Sefroua, bay filly, 2005, by Kingmambo. Won three races including the listed Prix de Lieurey.
- Pursuit of Glory, bay filly, 2006, by Fusaichi Pegasus. Won one race.
- Encompassing, bay colt, 2007, by Montjeu. Won one race.
- Diogenes, bay colt, 2008, by Galileo. Failed to win in six races.
- Sanima, bay filly, 2010, by Galileo. Unraced
- Embellishment, bay filly, 2011, by Galileo. Unraced.
- Serena's Pride, bay filly, 2013, by Fastnet Rock. Foaled in Australia. Unraced

== Pedigree ==
Pedigree of Sophisticat (USA), bay or brown mare, 1999
Sire Storm Cat (USA) 1983	Storm Bird (CAN); 1978	Northern Dancer	Nearctic
Sire Storm Cat (USA) 1983	Storm Bird (CAN); 1978	Northern Dancer	Natalma
Sire Storm Cat (USA) 1983	Storm Bird (CAN); 1978	South Ocean	New Providence
Sire Storm Cat (USA) 1983	Storm Bird (CAN); 1978	South Ocean	Shining Sun
Sire Storm Cat (USA) 1983	Terlingua (USA); 1976	Secretariat	Bold Ruler
Sire Storm Cat (USA) 1983	Terlingua (USA); 1976	Secretariat	Somethingroyal
Sire Storm Cat (USA) 1983	Terlingua (USA); 1976	Crimson Saint	Crimson Satan
Sire Storm Cat (USA) 1983	Terlingua (USA); 1976	Crimson Saint	Bolero Rose
Dam Serena's Song (USA) 1992	Rahy (USA); 1985	Blushing Groom	Red God
Dam Serena's Song (USA) 1992	Rahy (USA); 1985	Blushing Groom	Runaway Bride
Dam Serena's Song (USA) 1992	Rahy (USA); 1985	Glorious Song	Halo
Dam Serena's Song (USA) 1992	Rahy (USA); 1985	Glorious Song	Ballade
Dam Serena's Song (USA) 1992	Imagining (USA); 1983	Northfields	Northern Dancer
Dam Serena's Song (USA) 1992	Imagining (USA); 1983	Northfields	Little Hut
Dam Serena's Song (USA) 1992	Imagining (USA); 1983	Image Intensifier	Dancer's Image
Dam Serena's Song (USA) 1992	Imagining (USA); 1983	Image Intensifier	Pat's Irish (Family 7)

- Sophisticat was inbred 3 × 4 to Northern Dancer, meaning that this stallion appears in both the third and the fourth generation of her pedigree.
