= Mezzo Soprano (horse) =

British-bred Thoroughbred racehorse

- Sire: Darshaan
- Grandsire: Shirley Heights
- Dam: Morn of Song
- Damsire: Blushing Groom
- Sex: Mare
- Foaled: 1 March 2000
- Country: United States
- Colour: Dark bay or brown
- Breeder: Darley Stud
- Owner: Sheikh Mohammed; Godolphin
- Trainer: André Fabre; Saeed bin Suroor
- Record: 9: 4-1-2
- Earnings: £178,971

Major wins
- UAE 1000 Guineas (2003); Galtres Stakes (2003); Prix Vermeille (2003)

Mezzo Soprano (1 March 2000 – 2013) was an American-bred Thoroughbred racehorse and broodmare. After winning her only race as a juvenile in 2002 she developed into a top-class performer in the following year, winning the UAE 1000 Guineas, Galtres Stakes and Prix Vermeille. She was also placed in the Lupe Stakes, Ribblesdale Stakes and Prix de Psyché. She had some success as a broodmare.

== Background ==
Mezzo Soprano was a dark bay or brown mare with an elongated white star bred in Kentucky by her owner Sheikh Mohammed's Darley Stud. She was sent into training with André Fabre at Chantilly.

She was sired by Darshaan who won the Prix du Jockey Club for the Aga Khan in 1984 before becoming a successful breeding stallion. The best of his other offspring included Dalakhani, Hellenic, Mark of Esteem and Kotashaan. Mezzo Soprano's dam Morn of Song showed modest racing ability, winning one minor race from four starts. She was a daughter of the outstanding Canadian mare Glorious Song, making her a half-sister to Singspiel and a full-sister to Rahy.

== Racing career ==
=== 2003: two-year-old season ===
On her first and only start as a two-year-old Mezzo Soprano started the 1.3/1 favourite for the Prix de Grandouet, a maiden race over 1600 metres on very soft ground at Deauville Racecourse on 10 August. Ridden by Olivier Peslier she took the lead 200 metres from the finish and won "easily" by a length from State of Art, a filly who went on to win the Prix de la Nonette.

At the end of the year the filly was transferred to the ownership of Godolphin and sent to Dubai where she joined the training stable of Saeed bin Suroor.

=== 2004: three-year-old season ===
Mezzo Soprano began her second campaign at Nad Al Sheba Racecourse on 13 March when she contested the UAE 1000 Guineas over 1600 metres on dirt in which she was ridden by Kerrin McEvoy and won by three lengths from Gonfilia after taking the lead 300 metres from the finish. Godolphin's racing manager Simon Crisford commented "She is a super filly, was working very well and we had high hopes for her. She won very well at Deauville last summer and is a lovely filly with a bright future".

On her return to Europe Mezzo Soprano went off the 7/1 fourth choice in the betting for the 1000 Guineas on 4 May over the Rowley Mile at Newmarket Racecourse but after racing prominently she dropped away in the closing stages and came home fourteenth of the nineteen runners behind Russian Rhythm. Seventeen days later she was dropped back to Listed class for the Lupe Stakes over ten furlongs at Goodwood Racecourse and finished second to Ocean Silk. At Royal Ascot on 19 June she was moved up in distance to contest the Ribblesdale Stakes over one and a half miles and briefly took the lead in the straight before being overtaken and coming home third behind Spanish Sun and Ocean Silk. In the Prix de Psyché at Deauville on 9 August she led for most of the way but was headed 200 metres from the finish and ran third behind Commercante and Baie. Twelve days later the filly was ridden by Frankie Dettori in the Listed Galtres Stakes over one and a half miles at York Racecourse and started the 4/1 joint favourite alongside the Henry Cecil-trained Singleton. After tracking the leaders she took the lead approaching the final furlong and kept on well to win by a neck from the 16/1 outsider Thingmebob.

On 14 September Mezzo Soprano was ridden by Dettori when she went off at odds of 8/1 in the Group 1 Prix Vermeille over 2400 metres at Longchamp Racecourse. The Prix de Pomone winner Vallee Enchantee started favourite while the other nine runners included Yesterday, Ocean Silk, Fidelite (Prix Saint-Alary), Casual Look, State of Art, Commercante and Whortleberry (Prix Minerve). Mezzo Soprano settled behind Butterfly Blue who set the pace before giving way to Casual Look who turned into the straight with a three length advantage. Mezzo Soprano took the lead from Casual Look 200 metres from the finish and stayed on well under pressure to repel the late challenge of Yesterday and win by a head. Crisford commented "That was her Arc. She comes from such a prestigious family and Sheikh Mohammed will decide where she goes next".

For her final race, Mezzo Soprano was sent to California for the Breeders' Cup Filly & Mare Turf at Santa Anita Racecourse on 25 October where she made little impact and came home unplaced behind Islington.

== Breeding record ==
After her retirement from racing Mezzo Soprano became a broodmare for the Darley Stud. She produced at least three winners from five foals:

- Claremont, bay colt, 2006, by Sadler's Wells. Won four races including the Prix du Lys, Aston Park Stakes and Nad Al Sheba Trophy.
- Perfect Note, bay filly, 2007, by Shamardal. Won one race, dam of the Prix de Malleret winner Strathspey.
- Conservatoire, bay filly, 2009, by Street Cry. Unraced, dam of the Kokura Daishoten winner Territorial.
- Ibtasama, bay filly, 2010, by Street Cry. Unraced.
- Opera Dame, bay filly, 2013, by Medaglia d'Oro. Won one race.

Mezzo Soprano died in 2013 at the age of thirteen.

== Pedigree ==
Pedigree of Mezzo Soprano (GB), bay mare, 2000
Sire Darshaan (GB) 1981	Shirley Heights (GB); 1975	Mill Reef (USA)	Never Bend
Sire Darshaan (GB) 1981	Shirley Heights (GB); 1975	Mill Reef (USA)	Milan Mill
Sire Darshaan (GB) 1981	Shirley Heights (GB); 1975	Hardiemma	Hardicanute
Sire Darshaan (GB) 1981	Shirley Heights (GB); 1975	Hardiemma	Grand Cross
Sire Darshaan (GB) 1981	Delsy (FR); 1972	Abdos	Arbar
Sire Darshaan (GB) 1981	Delsy (FR); 1972	Abdos	Pretty Lady (GB)
Sire Darshaan (GB) 1981	Delsy (FR); 1972	Kelty	Venture (GB)
Sire Darshaan (GB) 1981	Delsy (FR); 1972	Kelty	Marilla
Dam Morn of Song (USA) 1988	Blushing Groom (FR); 1974	Red God (USA)	Nasrullah (GB)
Dam Morn of Song (USA) 1988	Blushing Groom (FR); 1974	Red God (USA)	Spring Run
Dam Morn of Song (USA) 1988	Blushing Groom (FR); 1974	Runaway Bride (GB)	Wild Risk (FR)
Dam Morn of Song (USA) 1988	Blushing Groom (FR); 1974	Runaway Bride (GB)	Aimee
Dam Morn of Song (USA) 1988	Glorious Song (CAN); 1976	Halo (USA)	Hail To Reason
Dam Morn of Song (USA) 1988	Glorious Song (CAN); 1976	Halo (USA)	Cosmah
Dam Morn of Song (USA) 1988	Glorious Song (CAN); 1976	Ballade (USA)	Herbager (FR)
Dam Morn of Song (USA) 1988	Glorious Song (CAN); 1976	Ballade (USA)	Miss Swapsco (Family: 12-c)
