= Yesterday (horse) =

Irish-bred Thoroughbred racehorse

- Sire: Sadler's Wells
- Grandsire: Northern Dancer
- Dam: Jude
- Damsire: Darshaan
- Sex: Mare
- Foaled: 27 February 2000
- Country: Ireland
- Colour: Bay
- Breeder: Premier Bloodstock
- Owner: Susan Magnier & Roisin Henry
- Trainer: Aidan O'Brien
- Record: 16: 3-4-2
- Earnings: £475,810

Major wins
- Eyrefield Stakes (2002); Irish 1000 Guineas (2003)

Yesterday (foaled 27 February 2000) was an Irish Thoroughbred racehorse and broodmare. She showed considerable promise as a two-year-old in 2002, winning a maiden race and being placed in the Debutante Stakes and the Rockfel Stakes before taking the Eyrefield Stakes. In the following spring she won the Irish 1000 Guineas and appeared an unlucky loser when narrowly beaten in The Oaks. She failed to win again but finished placed in the Prix Vermeille, Prix de l'Opéra and the Breeders' Cup Filly and Mare Turf.

== Background ==
Yesterday is a bay mare with a broad white blaze and four white socks bred in Ireland by Premier Bloodstock, a breeding company owned by John Magnier of the Coolmore Stud and Richard Henry. During her racing career she was owned by Susan Magnier and Richard Henry's wife Roisin and was trained at Ballydoyle by Aidan O'Brien. She was ridden in most of her races by Mick Kinane.

She was from the fifteenth crop of foals sired by Sadler's Wells, who won the Irish 2000 Guineas, Eclipse Stakes and Irish Champion Stakes in 1984 went on to be the Champion sire on fourteen occasions. Yesterday's dam Jude showed little ability as a racehorse, failing to win in four starts before being sold to Premier Bloodstock for 92,000 guineas as a three-year-old. She made more impact as a broodmare, with her other foals including Quarter Moon (second in The Oaks) and All My Loving (third in the Epsom Oaks). Several of Jude's foals were named in reference to Beatles songs: apart from Yesterday ("Yesterday") and All My Loving ("All My Loving") they included Magicalmysterytour ("Magical Mystery Tour") and Betterbetterbetter (from the lyric of "Hey Jude"). Jude's dam Alruccaba was an influential broodmare whose other descendants have included Alborada, Allegretto (Prix Royal Oak), Aussie Rules (Poule d'Essai des Poulains) and Albanova (Preis von Europa).

== Racing career ==
=== 2002: two-year-old season ===
Yesterday began her racing career in the Listed Fillies' Sprint Stakes at Naas Racecourse on 3 June in which she finished eighth of the eleven runners behind the British challenger Rag Top. Later that month she started 1/2 favourite for a seven furlong maiden race at Tipperary Racecourse and won "comfortably" by two lengths from Encircle. The filly was then stepped up in class and started 5/4 favourite for the Group Three Debutante Stakes at the Curragh in August but was beaten into second by the 14/1 outsider Rainbows For All.

After a break of almost two month Yesterday was sent to France for the Group One Prix Marcel Boussac over 1600 metres at Longchamp Racecourse on 6 October. After turning into the straight in third place she was outpaced in the closing stages and finished sixth of the ten runners behind Six Perfections. Less than two weeks later she appeared at Newmarket Racecourse in England to contest the Rockfel Stakes and finished third behind Luvah Girl and Casual Look. On her final appearance of the year Yesterday was matched against male opposition in the Listed Eyrefield Stakes over nine furlongs on heavy ground at Leopardstown Racecourse on 10 November. Starting the 6/4 favourite in an eighteen-runner field she took the lead a furlong from the finish and accelerated away from her rivals to win "easily" by four lengths. Her win meant that Kinane clinched his 12th Irish Champion Jockey title.

=== 2003: three-year-old season ===
Yesterday began her second season in the 1000 Guineas over the Rowley Mile at Newmarket on 4 May in which she started a 20/1 outsider and finished eighth of the nineteen runners as Russian Rhythm won from Six Perfections, Intercontinental and Soviet Song. Three weeks later at the Curragh Yesterday was one of eight fillies to contest the Irish 1000 Guineas and started the 11/2 second choice in the betting behind Six Perfections who was made the odds-on favourite. The other runners included Walayef (Round Tower Stakes, Athasi Stakes), Dimitrova (Leopardstown 1,000 Guineas Trial Stakes), Luminata (Silver Flash Stakes) and Cat Belling (Derrinstown Stud 1,000 Guineas Trial). Yesterday raced in fourth place as L'Ancresse set the pace before Dimitrova went to the front two furlongs from the finish. She overtook Dimitrova inside the final furlong and held off the late challenge of Six Perfections to win by a short head. The runner-up appeared somewhat unfortunate as her jockey Johnny Murtagh was unable to obtain a clear run until the final strides. Aidan O'Brien commented "Mick's ride was perfection. Yesterday stops when she hits the front but he couldn't wait any longer than he did. She goes on fast ground but she does like an ease. She will go for the Oaks". Kinane said, "Some days the luck bounces for you and some days it doesn't. Johnny found himself in one of those positions today. But in fairness to Yesterday, she did everything right".

On 6 June Yesterday was moved up in distance and started 100/30 favourite for the 225th running of the Oaks Stakes over one and a half miles at Epsom Downs Racecourse. After being restrained in the early stages she attempted to move into contention in the straight but was repeatedly blocked and hampered before obtaining a clear run inside the final furlong. She finished strongly but failed by a neck to peg back Casual Look, appearing to be an unlucky loser. The Irish Times's correspondent stated that she was "clearly the best filly in the race". In the Irish Oaks at the Curragh on 13 July she started the 11/8 favourite but finished fourth behind Vintage Tipple, L'Ancresse and Casual Look.

After a late summer break Yesterday was sent to France for the Group One Prix Vermeille over 2400 metres at Longchamp on 14 September. Ridden by Jamie Spencer she turned into the straight in fifth place and stayed on well but failed by a head to overhaul the Godolphin filly Mezzo Soprano. The filly was matched against older fillies and mares when she returned to Longchamp for the Prix de l'Opéra over 2000 metres on 5 October. She was held up at the back of the field before making a strong late run and finished second, beaten a head by the British-trained four-year-old Zee Zee Top with Bright Sky (winner of the race in 2002) a neck away in third. Yesterday was then sent to America for the Breeders' Cup Filly and Mare Turf at Santa Anita Park on 25 October in which she stayed on from the rear of the field to finish third behind Islington and L'Ancresse.

=== 2004: four-year-old season ===
Yesterday remained in training as a four-year-old and was ridden by Spencer in all three of her starts. After an absence of more than ten months she returned in the Matron Stakes at Leopardstown on 11 September and finished fifth of the six runners behind Soviet Song. She then ran for the second time in the Prix de l'Opéra and finished fourth behind Alexander Goldrun. She ended her racing career with a second attempt at the Breeders Cup Filly & Mare Turf at Lone Star Park on 30 October and finished fifth behind Ouija Board in a twelve-runner field.

== Breeding record ==
Yesterday was retired from racing to become a broodmare for Premier Bloodstock. She has produced six foals and two winners:

- Bishop of Derry, a bay colt (later gelded), foaled in 2006, sired by Giant's Causeway. Failed to win in 4 races.
- Perfect Day, bay filly, 2009, by Holy Roman Emperor. Failed to win in six races.
- Dos, bay colt, 2010, by Danehill Dancer. Exported to Kazakhstan.
- High Baroque, bay colt (gelded), 2012, by Lookin At Lucky. Won one race.
- Day Away, bay filly, 2013, by Lookin At Lucky. Unplaced on only start.
- Tomorrowcomes, filly, 2014, by Oasis Dream. Won one race.

== Pedigree ==
Pedigree of Yesterday (IRE) bay mare 2000
Sire Sadler's Wells (USA) 1981	Northern Dancer (CAN); 1961	Nearctic	Nearco
Sire Sadler's Wells (USA) 1981	Northern Dancer (CAN); 1961	Nearctic	Lady Angela
Sire Sadler's Wells (USA) 1981	Northern Dancer (CAN); 1961	Natalma	Native Dancer
Sire Sadler's Wells (USA) 1981	Northern Dancer (CAN); 1961	Natalma	Almahmoud
Sire Sadler's Wells (USA) 1981	Fairy Bridge (USA). 1975	Bold Reason	Hail to Reason
Sire Sadler's Wells (USA) 1981	Fairy Bridge (USA). 1975	Bold Reason	Lalun
Sire Sadler's Wells (USA) 1981	Fairy Bridge (USA). 1975	Special	Forli
Sire Sadler's Wells (USA) 1981	Fairy Bridge (USA). 1975	Special	Thong
Dam Jude (GB) 1994	Darshaan (GB); 1981	Shirley Heights	Mill Reef
Dam Jude (GB) 1994	Darshaan (GB); 1981	Shirley Heights	Hardiemma
Dam Jude (GB) 1994	Darshaan (GB); 1981	Delsy	Abdos
Dam Jude (GB) 1994	Darshaan (GB); 1981	Delsy	Kelty
Dam Jude (GB) 1994	Alruccaba (IRE); 1983	Crystal Palace	Caro
Dam Jude (GB) 1994	Alruccaba (IRE); 1983	Crystal Palace	Hermieres
Dam Jude (GB) 1994	Alruccaba (IRE); 1983	Allara	Zeddaan
Dam Jude (GB) 1994	Alruccaba (IRE); 1983	Allara	Nucciolina (family: 9-c)
