= Bright Sky =

Irish-bred racehorse

- Sire: Wolfhound
- Grandsire: Nureyev
- Dam: Bright Moon
- Damsire: Alysheba
- Sex: Mare
- Foaled: 8 May 1999
- Country: Ireland
- Colour: Chestnut
- Breeder: Dayton Investments
- Owner: Daniel Wildenstein; Ecurie Wildestein
- Trainer: Élie Lellouche
- Record: 19: 6-5-3
- Earnings: £527,027

Major wins
- Prix de Diane (2002); Prix de l'Opéra (2002); Prix d'Astarte (2003)

Bright Sky (foaled 8 May 1999) was an Irish-bred, French-trained Thoroughbred racehorse and broodmare who raced in France, Japan, the United States. Hong Kong and Dubai. After winning three minor races as a juvenile in 2001 she emerged as a top-class performer in the following year, winning the Prix de Diane and Prix de l'Opéra as well as running second in the Prix Saint-Alary and third in the Prix Vermeille. In 2003 she added a third Group 1 success in the Prix d'Astarte and was placed in the Prix d'Ispahan, Prix du Moulin and Prix de l'Opéra. She was retired from racing after two unsuccessful starts as a five-year-old. As a broodmare she produced several minor winners.

== Background ==
Bright Sky is a chestnut mare with white star and a white sock on her left hind leg bred in Ireland by Dayton Investments, the breeding company of her owner Daniel Wildenstein. After Wildenstein's death in October 2001 the filly was owned by the executors of his estate before passing into the ownership of Ecurie Wildenstein in 2002. She was sent into training with Jean-Marie Béguigné at Chantilly in France and was ridden in most of her races by Dominique Boeuf.

She was the most successful horse sired by Wolfhound an American-bred sprinter who won the Prix de la Forêt in 1992 and the Haydock Sprint Cup in 1993. Bright Sky's dam Bright Moon was a top-class racemare who won the Prix de Pomone in 1993 and 1994. She was descended from the influential French broodmare La Troienne.

== Racing career ==
=== 2001: two-year-old season ===
On her racecourse debut, Bright Sky started 2/1 favourite for a maiden race over 1400 metres on soft ground at Clairefontaine Racecourse on 22 July and won by a length from Ana Marie. After finishing fifth behind Melody Blue in a race over 1600 metres at Chantilly Racecourse in August she recorded a five length victory in a minor event over 1800 metres on heavy ground at Longchamp Racecourse on 21 October. In November the filly ended her season by winning the Prix Belle Sicambre over the same distance at Maisons-Laffitte Racecourse coming home four lengths clear of her seven opponents.

=== 2002: three-year-old season ===
Bright Sky began her second season with a step up in class for the Listed Prix Finlande over 1800 metres at Longchamp on 7 April and ran second, beaten three quarters of a length by Turtle Bow. In the Group 3 Prix Vanteaux over the same course and distance three weeks later she finished strongly but failed by a short head to overhaul Ana Marie. At the same track on 19 May the filly started 2.2/1 favourite (coupled with her stablemate Atlantique) in the Group 1 Prix Saint-Alary over 2000 metres. After being restrained towards the rear of the field she produced a sustained run on the outside but was beaten a neck into second place by the outsider Marotta.

Despite finishing runner-up in her last three starts Bright Sky started 3/1 favourite for the Prix de Diane over 2100 metres at Chantilly on 9 June. Her fourteen opponents included Marotta, Ana Marie, Turtle Bow (Prix Cléopâtre), Dance Routine (Prix de Royaumont), Music Club (Prix Melisande), Monturani (Fillies' Trial Stakes), Ombre Legere (Prix Penelope) and Summertime Legacy (Prix des Réservoirs). Bright Sky was held up by Boeuf in the early stages, as her stablemate Blue Lightning set the pace, and was still in last place exiting the final turn. She then made rapid progress in the straight, producing what was described as a "devastating burst of acceleration" to overtake Turtle Bow 150 metres from the finish and win by two lengths from Dance Routine. Turtle Bow finished third but was relegated to fourth behind Ana Marie for causing interference.

After a three-month break Bright Sky was stepped up in distance for the Prix Vermeille over 2400 metres at Longchamp on 15 September and came home third of the eleven runners behind Pearly Shells and Ana Marie. She was then dropped back in trip for the 2000 metres Prix de l'Opéra at Longchamp on 6 October when she was accompanied by her pacemaker Blue Lightning and started the 0.9/1 favourite in a twelve-runner field. Her opponents for the Group 1 prize included Quarter Moon, Irresistible Jewel (Ribblesdale Stakes), Marotta, Serisia (Prix de Psyché), Walzerkoenigin (Prix Chloé) and Golden Silca (Mill Reef Stakes). Blue Lightning set the pace with Bright Sky settling at the rear of the field before producing her customary stretch run. She gained the advantage from Irresistible Jewel 200 metres from the finish and drew away to win in "impressive" style by four lengths.

For her final race of 2002 Bright Sky was sent to Japan to contest the Japan Cup which was run that year over 2200 metres at Nakayama Racecourse on 24 November. Ridden by Thierry Thulliez she was never in contention and came home thirteenth of the sixteen runners, nine and a half lengths behind the winner Falbrav.

=== 2003: four-year-old season ===
On her first appearance as a four-year-old Bright Sky started 1.4/1 favourite for the Prix Ganay over 2000 metres at Longchamp on 18 May but despite staying on well in the straight she was beaten a length and a half into second place by Falbrav. After a lengthy absence from the track the filly returned on 3 August to contest the Group 1 Prix d'Astarte over 1600 metres at Deauville Racecourse and went off the 4.9/1 third choice in the betting behind the three-year-olds Six Perfections and Acago (Prix Chloé). The rest of the twelve-runner field included Musical Chimes (Poule d'Essai des Poulains), Campsie Fells (Prix Vanteaux) and Diacada (Henckel-Rennen). Bright Sky raced in mid-division before making progress entering the last 300 metres and ran down Six Perfections in the final strides to win by a neck. Boeuf commented: "I was a little worried when Six Perfections went for home, because we all know how good she is. However, Bright Sky responded magnificently. It was a calculated risk bringing the filly back in trip, and her preparations have been geared accordingly."

At Longchamp on 3 September Bright Sky started 2/1 favourite for the Prix du Moulin and kept on well after being briefly outpaced in the straight to finish third behind Nebraska Tornado and the Japanese challenger Lohengrin. On 5 October Bright Sky started favourite as attempted to repeat her 2002 victory in the Prix de l'Opéra but despite taking the lead 300 metres from the finish she was overtaken in the final strides and beaten a neck and a head into third place by Zee Zee Top and Yesterday. Three weeks later the filly was sent to California to contest the Breeders' Cup Turf at Santa Anita Park and came home sixth of the eight runners behind the dead heaters High Chaparral and Johar. She ended her season in December at Sha Tin Racecourse when she finished fourth behind her old rival Falbrav in the Hong Kong Cup.

=== 2004: five-year-old season ===
Bright Sky remained in training as a five-year-old and made her seasonal debut in the Prix Exbury at Saint-Cloud on 6 March. She started favourite and took the lead in the final stages only to be caught on the line and beaten a short head by the seven-year-old Polish Summer. Three weeks later she was sent to the United Arab Emirates to contest the Dubai Duty Free Stakes at Nad Al Sheba Racecourse and came home seventh of the eleven runners behind Paolini, beaten two and a half lengths by the German-trained winner.

== Breeding record ==
At the end of her racing career Bright Sky was retired to become a broodmare for Dayton Investments (now owned by the Wildenstein family). She produced at least eight foals and three winners:

- Bright Style, a bay filly, foaled in 2005, sired by Fasliyev. Failed to win in two races.
- Blagueuse, bay filly, 2007, by Statue of Liberty. Won two races.
- Blue Picture, chestnut filly, 2008, by Peintre Celebre. Failed to win in two races.
- Best of All, bay filly, 2009, by Dylan Thomas. Won one race.
- Balmoral Mills, bay colt, 2010, by Monsun. Unraced.
- Bryce Canyon, bay filly, 2011, by Galileo. Second in her only race.
- Bengala, chestnut filly, 2014, by Pivotal. Won one race.
- Le Baryton, chestnut colt, 2016, by Australia. Unplaced in his only race.

== Pedigree ==
Pedigree of Bright Sky (IRE), chestnut mare, 1999
Sire Wolfhound (USA) 1989	Nureyev (USA); 1977	Northern Dancer (CAN)	Nearctic
Sire Wolfhound (USA) 1989	Nureyev (USA); 1977	Northern Dancer (CAN)	Natalma (USA)
Sire Wolfhound (USA) 1989	Nureyev (USA); 1977	Special	Forli (ARG)
Sire Wolfhound (USA) 1989	Nureyev (USA); 1977	Special	Thong
Sire Wolfhound (USA) 1989	Lassie Dear (USA); 1974	Buckpasser	Tom Fool
Sire Wolfhound (USA) 1989	Lassie Dear (USA); 1974	Buckpasser	Busanda
Sire Wolfhound (USA) 1989	Lassie Dear (USA); 1974	Gay Missile	Sir Gaylord
Sire Wolfhound (USA) 1989	Lassie Dear (USA); 1974	Gay Missile	Missy Baba
Dam Bright Moon (USA) 1990	Alysheba (USA); 1984	Alydar	Raise a Native
Dam Bright Moon (USA) 1990	Alysheba (USA); 1984	Alydar	Sweet Tooth
Dam Bright Moon (USA) 1990	Alysheba (USA); 1984	Bel Sheba	Lt Stevens
Dam Bright Moon (USA) 1990	Alysheba (USA); 1984	Bel Sheba	Belthazar
Dam Bright Moon (USA) 1990	Bonshamile (GB); 1983	Ile de Bourbon (USA)	Nijinsky (CAN)
Dam Bright Moon (USA) 1990	Bonshamile (GB); 1983	Ile de Bourbon (USA)	Roseliere (FR)
Dam Bright Moon (USA) 1990	Bonshamile (GB); 1983	Narration (USA)	Sham
Dam Bright Moon (USA) 1990	Bonshamile (GB); 1983	Narration (USA)	Diary (Family: 1-x)
