= Yeats Stakes =

Flat horse race in Ireland

Yeats Stakes
2026
Limestone	Asakir	New Zealand

Previous years
2025
Carmers	What's Your Game	Delta
2024
Birdman	Bellezza	Gasper De Lemos
2023
Peking Opera	Etna Rosso	Covent Garden
2022
Cairde Go Deo	Hotter Than Hades	Willesee
2021
Sir Lucan	Wordsworth	Party House

2020-2017
2020
Galileo Chrome	Emperor Of The Sun	Red Kelly
2019
Western Australia	Pythion	Masaff
2018
Southern France	Drapers Guild	Whirling Dervish
2017
Naughty Or Nice	Grandee	Finn McCool

The Yeats Stakes is a Listed flat horse race in Ireland open to thoroughbreds aged three years only. It is run at Navan over a distance of 1 mile and 5 furlongs (2,616 metres), and it is scheduled to take place each year in May.

The race was run for the first time in 2017.

== Records ==
Leading jockey (2 wins):

- Donnacha O'Brien – Southern France (2018), Western Australia (2019)

Leading trainer (4 wins):

- Aidan O'Brien – Southern France (2018), Western Australia (2019), Sir Lucan (2021), Peking Opera (2023)

== Winners ==
Year	Winner	Jockey	Trainer	Time
2017	Naughty Or Nice	Declan McDonogh	John Oxx	2:54.02
2018	Southern France	Donnacha O'Brien	Aidan O'Brien	2:51.00
2019	Western Australia	Donnacha O'Brien	Aidan O'Brien	2:49.97
2020	Galileo Chrome (Note: The 2020 race was run in August due to the COVID-19 pandemic in the Republic of Ireland)	Shane Crosse	Joseph O'Brien	2:58.11
2021	Sir Lucan	Wayne Lordan	Aidan O'Brien	2:55.16
2022	Cairde Go Deo	Colin Keane	Ger Lyons	2:53.81
2023	Peking Opera	Seamie Heffernan	Aidan O'Brien	3:06.85
2024	Birdman	Shane Foley	Jessica Harrington	3:00.28
2025	Carmers	Billy Lee	Paddy Twomey	2:51.04
2026	Limestone	Dylan Browne McMonagle	Joseph O'Brien	2:53:13

== See also ==
- Horse racing in Ireland
- List of Irish flat horse races
