= Brocade (horse) =

American-bred, British-trained Thoroughbred racehorse

- Sire: Habitat
- Grandsire: Sir Gaylord
- Dam: Canton Silk
- Damsire: Runnymede
- Sex: Mare
- Foaled: 31 May 1981
- Country: United States
- Colour: Bay
- Breeder: Cayton Park Stud
- Owner: Gerald Leigh
- Trainer: Guy Harwood
- Record: 11: 5-1-0

Major wins
- Oak Tree Stakes (1984); Challenge Stakes (1984); Prix de la Forêt (1985)

Brocade (31 May 1981 – 2003) was a British-trained Thoroughbred racehorse and broodmare. Unraced as a juvenile she began her racing career in 1984 and showed high class form to win the Oak Tree Stakes and the Challenge Stakes as well as finishing second in the Prix Quincey. After struggling to recapture her best form as a four-year-old she ended her racing career with a win in the Prix de la Forêt. She was highly successful as a broodmare, producing several winners including Barathea and Gossamer.

== Background ==
Brocade was a "robust, good-quartered" bay mare bred in England by her owner, Gerald Leigh's Cayton Park Stud. He was sent into training with Guy Harwood at Pulborough, West Sussex. Harwood was noted for his modern approach to training, introducing Britain to features such as artificial gallops and barn-style stabling.

She was from the eleventh crop of foals sired by Habitat, an American-bred, British-raced miler who became one of the leading European stallions of the 1970s and 1980s. His other progeny included Habibti, Flying Water, Marwell, Rose Bowl and Steinlen and he was the British Champion broodmare sire on three occasions. Brocade's dam Canton Silk was a sprinter who won four races over the minimum distance of five furlongs. As a descendant of the broodmare French Kiss, she was a distant relative of Shangamuzo.

== Racing career ==
=== 1984: three-year-old season ===
Brocade was unraced as a juvenile but made a successful racecourse debut in April 1984 when she won a maiden race over seven furlongs at Newbury Racecourse when her beaten opponents included the highly rated Babacoote. In the following month she won the Autobar Stakes over one mile at Ascot Racecourse. She was expected to contest the Coronation Stakes at Royal Ascot in June but like many of Harwood's horses, she contacted a viral infection and was off the course for almost three months. At the end of July at Goodwood Racecourse Brocade returned in the Oak Tree Stakes and won in good style by one and a half lengths from Capricorn Belle. She was then matched against male opposition when she was sent to France for the Prix Quincey over 1600 metres at Deauville Racecourse and ran well in defeat, going down by a neck to the four-year-old gelding Teleprompter. At Newmarket Racecourse in October she was ridden by Greville Starkey when she started the 5/4 favourite for the Group 2 Challenge Stakes, in which the best of her opponents appeared to be Prego (Hungerford Stakes) and Forzando (Sandy Lane Stakes). Brocade accelerated into the lead a furlong from the finish and won very easily by three lengths. The filly ended her season in the Prix de la Forêt, run over 1400 metres on very soft ground at Longchamp Racecourse later that month and came home fifth of the ten runners, beaten less than two lengths by the winner Procida.

In the official International Classification for 1984, Brocade was rated the fifth-best three-year-old filly trained in England behind Katies, Circus Plume, Pebbles and Meis-El-Reem.

=== 1985: four-year-old season ===
Brocade began her second campaign with a drop back in distance for the Cork and Orrery Stakes over six furlongs at Royal Ascot in June and finished fourth behind the three-year-old filly Dafayna. She then ran sixth to Al Bahathri in the Child Stakes at Newmarket and ninth to Efisio in the Harroways Stakes at Goodwood. After the latter race, when she had looked light and sweaty before the start, Timeform's reporter commented that she had apparently "failed to train on", meaning that she had not made the expected progress from three to four.

When attempting to repeat her 1984 success in the Challenge Stakes, Brocade ran fourth behind Efisio, Chapel Cottage and Powder Keg in a blanket finish. On 27 October the filly made her second attempt to win the Prix de la Forêt at Longchamp and started a 23/1 outsider in a fourteen-runner field. She was ridden by Pat Eddery as Greville Starkey opted to ride her more fancied stablemate Young Runaway who started co-favourite alongside Procida and River Drummer (Prix du Pin). The other contenders included Bairn (St James's Palace Stakes), Dafayna, Efisio, Nikos (Prix Edmond Blanc) and Sarab (Park Stakes). Brocade belied her odds as she took the lead 400 metres from the finish and kept on well to win by a length from the fast-finishing Nikos.

In the official International Classification for 1985, Brocade was rated the third-best older female horse trained in England behind Pebbles and Free Guest.

== Breeding record ==
Brocade was retired from racing at the end of her second season to become a broodmare at her owner's stud. She produced at least thirteen foals and seven winners between 1987 and 2001.

- Free At Last, a bay filly, foaled in 1987, sired by Shirley Heights. Won three races including the Somerville Tattersall Stakes.
- Zabar, brown colt (later gelded), 1988, by Dancing Brave. Won six races including Oettingen Rennen, Prix du Muguet, Prix du Chemin de Fer du Nord, Prix Perth.
- Fort Shirley, bay colt, 1989, by Shirley Heights. Failed to win in three races.
- Barathea, bay colt, 1990, by Sadler's Wells. Won five races including Irish 2,000 Guineas, Queen Anne Stakes and Breeders' Cup Mile
- Foulard, bay filly, 1991, by Sadler's Wells. Unraced.
- National Treasure, bay filly, 1993, by Shirley Heights. Failed to win in three races.
- Bombazine, chestnut filly, 1994, by Generous. Won one race.
- Taffety, bay filly, 1995, by Last Tycoon. Unraced.
- Brocatelle, bay filly, 1996, by Green Desert. Failed to win in three races.
- Zibilene, bay filly, 1997, by Rainbow Quest. Won one race.
- Gossamer, bay filly, 1999, by Sadler's Wells. Won four races including the Prestige Stakes, Fillies' Mile and Irish 1000 Guineas.
- Camlet, bay filly, 2000, by Green Desert. Won two races.
- Serge, chestnut colt (gelded), 2001, by Nashwan. Unraced.

== Pedigree ==
Pedigree of Brocade (GB), bay mare, 1981
Sire Habitat (USA) 1966	Sir Gaylord; 1959	Turn-To (IRE)	Royal Charger (GB)
Sire Habitat (USA) 1966	Sir Gaylord; 1959	Turn-To (IRE)	Source Sucree (FR)
Sire Habitat (USA) 1966	Sir Gaylord; 1959	Somethingroyal	Princequillo (IRE)
Sire Habitat (USA) 1966	Sir Gaylord; 1959	Somethingroyal	Imperatrice
Sire Habitat (USA) 1966	Little Hut; 1952	Occupy	Bull Dog (FR)
Sire Habitat (USA) 1966	Little Hut; 1952	Occupy	Miss Bunting
Sire Habitat (USA) 1966	Little Hut; 1952	Savage Beauty	Challenger (GB)
Sire Habitat (USA) 1966	Little Hut; 1952	Savage Beauty	Khara
Dam Canton Silk (GB) 1970	Runnymede; 1961	Petition	Fair Trial
Dam Canton Silk (GB) 1970	Runnymede; 1961	Petition	Art Paper
Dam Canton Silk (GB) 1970	Runnymede; 1961	Dutch Clover	Winterhalter
Dam Canton Silk (GB) 1970	Runnymede; 1961	Dutch Clover	Entreat (IRE)
Dam Canton Silk (GB) 1970	Clouded Lamp; 1961	Nimbus	Nearco (ITY)
Dam Canton Silk (GB) 1970	Clouded Lamp; 1961	Nimbus	Kong
Dam Canton Silk (GB) 1970	Clouded Lamp; 1961	Kepwick	Linklater
Dam Canton Silk (GB) 1970	Clouded Lamp; 1961	Kepwick	Merrylips (Family: 14-a)
