= Wolfhound (horse) =

American-bred Thoroughbred racehorse

- Sire: Nureyev
- Grandsire: Northern Dancer
- Dam: Lassie Dear
- Damsire: Buckpasser
- Sex: Stallion
- Foaled: 22 April 1989
- Country: United States
- Colour: Chestnut
- Breeder: William S. Farish III & William S. Kilroy
- Owner: Sheikh Mohammed
- Trainer: John Gosden
- Record: 16: 6-3-2
- Earnings: £258,215

Major wins
- Diadem Stakes (1992); Prix de la Forêt (1992); Haydock Sprint Cup (1993)

Wolfhound (22 April 1989 – 2009) was a Thoroughbred racehorse and sire. He won the Haydock Sprint Cup and the Prix de la Forêt.

== Background ==
Wolfhound was a chestnut horse bred in Kentucky by William S. Farish III and William S. Kilroy. He was acquired by Sheikh Mohammed and was sent to race in Europe where he was trained by John Gosden.

== Racing career ==
Wolfhound raced for three years and won six of his sixteen races. As a three-year-old in 1992, he won the Diadem Stakes at Ascot and the Prix de la Forêt at Longchamp. In the following year he added another major victory when he took the Haydock Sprint Cup.

== Stud record ==
Wolfhound stood as a breeding stallion in Europe and South Africa but made little impact as a sire of winners. By far the best of his offspring was the filly Bright Sky.
