= Premio Dormello =

Flat horse race in Italy

- Class: Group 2
- Location: San Siro Racecourse; Milan, Italy
- Race type: Flat / Thoroughbred
- Website: San Siro

Race information
- Distance: 1,600 metres (1 mile)
- Surface: Turf
- Track: Right-handed
- Qualification: Two-year-old fillies
- Weight: 56 kg
- Purse: €121,000 (2016); 1st: €34,000

The Premio Dormello is a Group 2 flat horse race in Italy open to two-year-old thoroughbred fillies. It is run at Milan over a distance of 1,600 metres (about 1 mile), and it is scheduled to take place each year in October.

The event is named after Dormello, the stud farm of Federico Tesio. It was given Group 2 status in 1975 and relegated to Group 3 level in 1988 before reclaiming its Group 2 status in 2019.

== Records ==
Leading jockey since 1986 (3 wins):

- Mirco Demuro – Sonda (1999), Adamantina (2010), Bugie d'Amore (2011)

Leading trainer since 1986 (6 wins):

- John Dunlop – Three Tails (1986), Miss Secreto (1988, dead-heat), Brockette (1990), Scarlet Plume (1995), Barafamy (1998), Manbala (2005)

== Winners since 1989 ==
Year	Winner	Jockey	Trainer	Time
1989	Ruby Tiger	Richard Quinn	Paul Cole	1:38.30
1990	Brockette	Michael Roberts	John Dunlop	1:46.00
1991	Lasting Lass	Alessandro Parravani	Gabriele Miliani	1:46.40
1992	Foolish Heart	Frankie Dettori	Neil Graham	1:52.00
1993	Alpride	Peo Perlanti	Mario Ciciarelli	1:50.80
1994	Olimpia Dukakis	Giovanni Forte	Giuseppe Botti	1:52.50
1995	Scarlet Plume	Jason Weaver	John Dunlop	1:39.90
1996	Happy Dancer	Cash Asmussen	Robert Collet	1:43.20
1997	Wren	Fernando Jovine	Lord Huntingdon	1:39.60
1998	Barafamy	Richard Quinn	John Dunlop	1:45.80
1999	Sonda	Mirco Demuro	Alduino Botti	1:39.30
2000	Innit	Craig Williams	Mick Channon	1:42.60
2001	Kazzia	Fernando Jovine	Andreas Wöhler	1:42.20
2002	Lady Catherine	Frankie Dettori	Henri-Alex Pantall	1:45.10
2003	Mamela	Gabriele Bietolini	Andreas Löwe	1:41.50
2004	Nouvelle Noblesse	Edmondo Botti	Mario Hofer	1:40.90
2005	Manbala	Thierry Thulliez	John Dunlop	1:45.20
2006	Scoubidou	Adrie de Vries	Hans Blume	1:42.80
2007	Celtic Slipper	Seb Sanders	Ralph Beckett	1:39.20
2008	no race ^{[a]}
2009	Blessed Luck	Nicola Pinna	Stefano Botti	1:38.60
2010	Adamantina	Mirco Demuro	Vittorio Caruso	1:45.70
2011	Bugie d'Amore	Mirco Demuro	Bruno Grizzetti	1:36.40
2012	Punta Stella	Mario Esposito	Daniele Zarroli	1:40.60
2013	Ombrage	Dario Vargiu	Bruno Grizetti	1:42.40
2014	Fontanelice	Cristian Demuro	Stefano Botti	1:43.30
2015	Cassina De Pomm	Claudio Colombi	Stefano Botti	1:43.80
2016	Rainbow Royal	Eduardo Pedroza	Andreas Wöhler	1:36.30
2017	Sweet Gentle Kiss	Dario Vargiu	Stefano Botti	1:37.10
2018	Noblesse Oblige	Luca Maniezzi	Marco Gasparini	1:40.10
2019	Night Colours	Fabio Branca	Simon Crisford	1:37.80
2020	Telepatic Glances	Antonio Fresu	Endo Botti	1:42.20
2021	Atamisque^{[b]}	Mario Sanna	Alduino Botti	1:38.30
2022	Aloa	Dario Vargiu	Alduino Botti	1:43.40
2023	Folgaria	Claudio Colombi	Stefano Botti	1:42.00
2024	Klaynn	Dario Di Tocco	Endo Botti	1:44.20
2025	Just Call Me Angel	Robert Havlin	Ed Dunlop	1:36.90

^{a} The 2008 running was cancelled because of a strike.
^{b} The 2021 races took place at Capannelle.

== Earlier winners ==
- 1973: Tivola
- 1974: Sinthesis
- 1975: Ancholia
- 1976: Roman Blue
- 1977: Miss Carina
- 1978: Mesange Bleue
- 1979: Cos Display
- 1980: Val d'Erica
- 1981: Ilenia
- 1982: Stemegna
- 1983: Sly Moon
- 1984: Miss Gris
- 1985: Ivor's Image
- 1986: Three Tails
- 1987: Dyreen
- 1988: Marina Duff / Miss Secreto *

* The 1988 race was a dead-heat and has joint winners.

== See also ==
- List of Italian flat horse races
