= Dubai Destination =

American-bred Thoroughbred racehorse

- Sire: Kingmambo
- Grandsire: Mr. Prospector
- Dam: Mysterial
- Damsire: Alleged
- Sex: Stallion
- Foaled: 10 February 1999
- Country: United States
- Colour: Bay
- Breeder: Calumet Farm
- Owner: Sheikh Mohammed; Godolphin
- Trainer: David Loder; Saeed bin Suroor
- Record: 8: 4-2-0
- Earnings: £238,417

Major wins
- Champagne Stakes (2001); Queen Anne Stakes (2003)

Dubai Destination (foaled 11 February 1999) is a retired American-bred Thoroughbred racehorse and active sire. As a two-year-old he showed great promise, winning two of his three races including the Champagne Stakes, but was beaten on his only run in 2002. He returned after a year-long absence in 2003 and recorded his biggest win when taking the Queen Anne Stakes at Royal Ascot. He was retired to stud at the end of the year and has had some notable successes as a breeding stallion.

== Background ==
Dubai Destination is a bay horse with no white markings bred in Kentucky by Calumet Farm. His sire, Kingmambo was a highly successful breeding stallion whose progeny included the British Classic winners Russian Rhythm, King's Best, Henrythenavigator, Virginia Waters and Rule of Law as well as major winners in Japan (El Condor Pasa), France (Divine Proportions) and the United States (Lemon Drop Kid). Dubai Destination's dam, Mysterial showed no ability as a racehorse but became a very successful broodmare: her other foals have included Librettist (Prix Jacques Le Marois, Prix du Moulin) and Secret Number (Cumberland Lodge Stakes). Mysterial was a half-sister to Agnes World, a Japanese-trained sprinter who won the Prix de l'Abbaye and the July Cup in Europe.

In July 2000, the yearling colt was sent to the Keeneland sale and was bought for $1.5 million by John Ferguson Bloodstock, acting on behalf of Sheikh Mohammed. Dubai Destination was sent to Europe and entered the stable of David Loder at Newmarket. He was ridden in all but one of his races by Frankie Dettori.

== Racing career ==
=== 2001: two-year-old season ===
Dubai Destination made his racing debut in a six furlong maiden race at Newbury Racecourse on 14 June 2001. He started the 1/2 favourite in a twenty-runner field, but after taking the approaching the final furlong he was caught in the final strides and beaten a short head by the John Gosden-trained Waldenburg. A month later he was made 1/3 favourite for a maiden race over seven furlongs at Newmarket Racecourse. He disputed the lead for most of the way and drew away in the closing stages to win by three and a half length from Sohaib (later to win the Dee Stakes). On 14 September Dubai Destination was moved up in class to contest the Group Two Champagne Stakes over seven furlongs at Doncaster Racecourse. He started the 3/1 second favourite behind the Irish-trained Rock of Gibraltar who had won the Railway Stakes and the Gimcrack Stakes. After being restrained at the back of the eight-runner field, accelerated in the last quarter mile, overtook Rock of Gibraltar 100 yards from the finish and won by a length despite being eased down by Dettori in the final strides.

=== 2002: three-year-old season ===
Dubai Destination joined Sheikh Mohammed's Godolphin Racing operation and spent the winter of 2001/2002 in Dubai where he was trained by Saeed bin Suroor. He returned to Britain in the spring of 2002 and was strongly-fancied for the 2000 Guineas but had training problems and made only one racecourse appearance. On 21 May, ridden by Jamie Spencer, he started favourite for the Predominate Stakes over eleven furlongs at Goodwood Racecourse but was beaten two lengths into second place by the Michael Jarvis trained Coshocton.

=== 2003: four-year-old season ===
After an absence of more than a year, Dubai Destination returned for a minor stakes race over one mile at Nottingham Racecourse on 4 June 2003. He took the lead a quarter of a mile from the finish and won easily by six lengths at odds of 2/5. Two weeks later, Dubai Destination was sent to Royal Ascot where he was one of ten horses to contest the Queen Anne Stakes which was being run for the first time as a Group One race. He was made the 9/2 second favourite behind Hawk Wing, whilst the other contenders included Where Or When (Queen Elizabeth II Stakes), Tillerman (Celebration Mile), Desert Deer (Sandown Mile), Victory Moon (UAE Derby) and Right Approach. Dettori restrained Dubai Destination towards the rear of the field before making progress approaching the final turn. He took the lead two furlongs out and drew away to win by four lengths from Tillerman with Right Approach three quarters of a length back in third. The runner-up was later disqualified after testing positive for a banned substance.

Dubai Destination failed to repeat his Royal Ascot form in two subsequent races. In August he started favourite for the Prix Jacques Le Marois at Deauville Racecourse but finished fifth of the twelve runners behind Six Perfections. On his final appearance he started third favourite for the Queen Elizabeth II Stakes at Ascot, but ran poorly and finished last of the eight runners behind Falbrav.

== Stud record ==
At the end of his racing career, Dubai Destination was retired to become a breeding stallion for his owner's Darley Stud organisation, beginning his stud career at the Dalham Hall Stud. The best of his offspring have included Farraaj (Winter Derby), Ibn Khaldun (Racing Post Trophy), Top Trip (Prix Hocquart), Alanza (Sceptre Stakes), Family One (Prix Robert Papin), Evading Tempete (Premio Regina Elena), Sampson (New Zealand St. Leger) and Fleche d'Or, dam of Prix de l'Arc de Triomphe winner Golden Horn. Standing at Glenview Stud in County Cork in 2010. Standing in Saudi Arabia in 2015.

== Pedigree ==
Pedigree of Dubai Destination (USA), bay stallion, 1999
Sire Kingmambo (USA) 1990	Mr. Prospector (USA); 1970	Raise a Native	Native Dancer
Sire Kingmambo (USA) 1990	Mr. Prospector (USA); 1970	Raise a Native	Raise You
Sire Kingmambo (USA) 1990	Mr. Prospector (USA); 1970	Gold Digger	Nashua
Sire Kingmambo (USA) 1990	Mr. Prospector (USA); 1970	Gold Digger	Sequence
Sire Kingmambo (USA) 1990	Miesque (USA); 1984	Nureyev	Northern Dancer
Sire Kingmambo (USA) 1990	Miesque (USA); 1984	Nureyev	Special
Sire Kingmambo (USA) 1990	Miesque (USA); 1984	Pasadoble	Prove Out
Sire Kingmambo (USA) 1990	Miesque (USA); 1984	Pasadoble	Santa Quilla
Dam Mysterial (USA) 1994	Alleged (USA); 1974	Hoist the Flag	Tom Rolfe
Dam Mysterial (USA) 1994	Alleged (USA); 1974	Hoist the Flag	Wavy Navy
Dam Mysterial (USA) 1994	Alleged (USA); 1974	Princess Pout	Prince John
Dam Mysterial (USA) 1994	Alleged (USA); 1974	Princess Pout	Determined Lady
Dam Mysterial (USA) 1994	Mysteries (USA); 1986	Seattle Slew	Bold Reasoning
Dam Mysterial (USA) 1994	Mysteries (USA); 1986	Seattle Slew	My Charmer
Dam Mysterial (USA) 1994	Mysteries (USA); 1986	Phydilla	Lyphard
Dam Mysterial (USA) 1994	Mysteries (USA); 1986	Phydilla	Godzilla (Family: 6-b)
