= Islington (horse) =

Irish-bred Thoroughbred racehorse

- Racing colours of Lord Weinstock
- Sire: Sadler's Wells
- Grandsire: Northern Dancer
- Dam: Hellenic
- Damsire: Darshaan
- Sex: Mare
- Foaled: 12 February 1999 (age 27)
- Country: Ireland
- Colour: Bay
- Breeder: Ballymacoll Stud
- Owner: Arnold Weinstock
- Trainer: Michael Stoute
- Record: 15:6-0-4
- Earnings: £991,240

Major wins
- Musidora Stakes (2002); Nassau Stakes (2002); Yorkshire Oaks (2002, 2003); Breeders' Cup Filly & Mare Turf (2003)

Awards
- American Champion Female Turf Horse (2003)

Islington (foaled 12 February 1999) is an Irish-bred, British-trained Thoroughbred racehorse and broodmare. In a racing career which lasted from August 2001 until November 2003 she won six of her fifteen races including four at Group One level. As a three-year-old she won the Musidora Stakes, and after disappointing in The Oaks, she returned to win the Nassau Stakes and the Yorkshire Oaks. At four she raced creditably against male opposition before returning to all-female competition to win a second Yorkshire Oaks and the Breeders' Cup Filly & Mare Turf. Despite racing only once in North America in 2003 she was voted American Champion Female Turf Horse at the Eclipse Awards.

== Background ==
Islington is a bay mare with no white markings bred in County Meath by the Ballymacoll Stud. She was one of at least eight Group/Grade One winners sired by the fourteen time champion sire Sadler's Wells. Her dam Hellenic won the Yorkshire Oaks and the Ribblesdale Stakes as well as finishing second in the St Leger Stakes. She went on to become an outstanding broodmare, producing Greek Dance (Bayerisches Zuchtrennen), Mountain High (Grand Prix de Saint-Cloud) and New Morning (Brigadier Gerard Stakes).

Islington began racing in the colours of the Ballymacoll Stud's owner Arnold Weinstock. She was trained throughout her racing career by Michael Stoute at the Freemason Lodge stables in Newmarket and ridden in all of her races by Kieren Fallon. Islington had a nervous disposition and often sweated heavily before her races.

== Racing career ==
=== 2001: two-year-old season ===
Islington made her first appearance in an evening meeting at Newmarket Racecourse on 17 August, when she finished sixth of the ten runners in a seven furlong maiden race. Despite her defeat, the filly was moved up in class for her next race, the Listed Oh So Sharp Stakes at Newmarket on 6 October. Starting at odds of 5/1 she briefly took the lead two furlongs from the finish before running third behind Protectress and Snowfire.

=== 2002: three-year-old season ===
On her three-year-old debut, Islington was dropped back to maiden company for a ten furlong race at Newbury Racecourse on 19 April 2002. She started the 4/6 favourite in a field of sixteen runners and won comfortably by one and a half lengths. In May, the filly started odds-on favourite for the Musidora Stakes at York Racecourse, a trial race for the Oaks Stakes. She took the lead three furlongs from the finish and won by a length from Spinnette with Alexander Three D (later to win the Park Hill Stakes) in third.

On 7 June 2002, Islington was one of fourteen fillies to contest the 224th running of the Oaks at Epsom Downs Racecourse. Racing on soft ground she tracked the favourite Kazzia, but after briefly moving up to challenge the leader early in the straight she faded in the closing stages to finish eighth. Following the death of Lord Weinstock in July, the ownership of Islington passed to the executors of his estate for the remainder of her racing career. Two months after her failure at Epsom, Islington was brought back in distance for the ten furlong Nassau Stakes at Goodwood Racecourse, where her opponents included Quarter Moon, who had finished eighteen and a half lengths in front of her when finishing second in the Oaks. Fallon settled the filly in fourth place before taking the lead two furlongs from the finish. Islington went six lengths clear of the field before being eased down in the closing stages to win by four lengths from the Prix Marcel Boussac winner Sulk. Eighteen days later, Islington was matched against the Oaks winner Kazzia in the Yorkshire Oaks. Fallon tracked the leaders on Islington before overtaking Kazzia two furlongs from the finish and drawing clear to win by five lengths from the Oaks d'Italia winner Guadelupe.

Islington's next start was in Europe's most prestigious all-aged race, the Prix de l'Arc de Triomphe at Longchamp Racecourse on 6 October. Starting at odds of 7.2/1 she took the lead in the straight but was overtaken 100 metres from the end of the race and finished fifth, two lengths behind the winner Marienbard. On her final appearance as a three-year-old, Islington was sent to the United States for the Breeders' Cup Filly & Mare Turf at Arlington Park, Chicago. She finished third of the twelve runners behind Starine and Banks Hill.

=== 2003: four-year-old season ===
As a four-year-old, Islington did not appear until June, when she contested a very strong renewal of the Prince of Wales's Stakes at Royal Ascot. She finished third behind Nayef and Rakti, with Falbrav fifth, Grandera seventh and Moon Ballad ninth of the ten runners. In the Eclipse Stakes at Sandown Park Racecourse, Islington was never better than third and faded in the closing stages to finish sixth behind Falbrav. On 20 August, Islington returned to York for her second Yorkshire Oaks in which she was opposed by the 2003 Oaks winner Casual Look. Starting at odds of 8/11, Islington took the lead two furlongs from the finish and won by a length from Ocean Silk, with Casual Look unplaced. After the race, Stoute identified the Arc and the Champion Stakes as likely targets.

In September, Islington was sent to Ireland for the Irish Champion Stakes. In a rough and controversial race, she finished third, beaten a neck and a head by High Chaparral and Falbrav, with the favourite Alamshar in fourth place. Islington was then sent to America for her second attempt at the Breeders' Cup Filly and Mare Turf. At Santa Anita Park on 25 October, she started 100/30 favourite in a field which included Tates Creek (Yellow Ribbon Stakes), Musical Chimes (Poule d'Essai des Pouliches), Voodoo Dancer (Diana Handicap), Yesterday, Heat Haze (Beverly D. Stakes), Mezzo Soprano (Prix Vermeille) and Dimitrova (Flower Bowl Invitational Stakes). The favourite raced in fourth as Bien Nicole opened up a ten length lead before coming back to the field approaching the straight. Islington accelerated in the closing stages and took the lead inside the final furlong to win by a neck from the Irish-trained outsider L'Ancresse. After the race Stoute said "I was always happy with her position", Stoute said that "it was a little tight on the turn, but as soon as we straightened for home, I knew she would win. She is a wonderful filly. There are not many better. Last year she had bad luck at Arlington."

On her final appearance, Islington contested the Japan Cup at Tokyo Racecourse but made little impression, finishing ninth of the eighteen runners behind Tap Dance City.

== Assessment and honours ==
Islington was voted American Champion Female Turf Horse in the Eclipse Awards for 2003. She received 90 votes, beating Heat Haze (74) and the Breeders' Cup Mile winner Six Perfections (66).

== Stud record ==
After her retirement from racing, Islington returned to the Ballymacoll Stud to become a broodmare. Despite being sent to leading stallions including Rainbow Quest, Dansili and Gone West, she has yet to make an impact as a dam of winners.

== Pedigree ==
Pedigree of Islington (GB) bay mare 1999
Sire Sadler's Wells (USA) 1981	Northern Dancer (CAN); 1961	Nearctic	Nearco
Sire Sadler's Wells (USA) 1981	Northern Dancer (CAN); 1961	Nearctic	Lady Angela
Sire Sadler's Wells (USA) 1981	Northern Dancer (CAN); 1961	Natalma	Native Dancer
Sire Sadler's Wells (USA) 1981	Northern Dancer (CAN); 1961	Natalma	Almahmoud
Sire Sadler's Wells (USA) 1981	Fairy Bridge (USA). 1975	Bold Reason	Hail to Reason
Sire Sadler's Wells (USA) 1981	Fairy Bridge (USA). 1975	Bold Reason	Lalun
Sire Sadler's Wells (USA) 1981	Fairy Bridge (USA). 1975	Special	Forli
Sire Sadler's Wells (USA) 1981	Fairy Bridge (USA). 1975	Special	Thong
Dam Hellenic (IRE) 1987	Darshaan (GB); 1981	Shirley Heights	Mill Reef
Dam Hellenic (IRE) 1987	Darshaan (GB); 1981	Shirley Heights	Hardiemma
Dam Hellenic (IRE) 1987	Darshaan (GB); 1981	Delsy	Abdos
Dam Hellenic (IRE) 1987	Darshaan (GB); 1981	Delsy	Kelty
Dam Hellenic (IRE) 1987	Grecian Sea (FR); 1978	Homeric	Ragusa
Dam Hellenic (IRE) 1987	Grecian Sea (FR); 1978	Homeric	Darlene
Dam Hellenic (IRE) 1987	Grecian Sea (FR); 1978	Sea Venture	Diatome
Dam Hellenic (IRE) 1987	Grecian Sea (FR); 1978	Sea Venture	Knighton House (family: 5-h)
