= Kazzia =

German-bred Thoroughbred racehorse

- Racing colours of Godolphin
- Sire: Zinaad
- Grandsire: Shirley Heights
- Dam: Khoruna
- Damsire: Lagunas
- Sex: Mare
- Foaled: 12 April 1999
- Died: March 2013
- Country: Germany
- Colour: Bay
- Breeder: Roswitha Grunewald
- Owner: Rennstal Wöhler; Godolphin
- Trainer: Andreas Wöhler; Saeed Bin Suroor
- Record: 7:5-0-0
- Earnings: £899,597

Major wins
- Premio Dormello (2001); 1000 Guineas (2002); Oaks Stakes (2002); Flower Bowl Invitational Stakes (2002)

Awards
- European Champion Three-Year-Old Filly (2002); Timeform rating 121

Kazzia was a German-bred Thoroughbred racehorse, who was trained in Germany, the United Arab Emirates and the United Kingdom. In a racing career which lasted from September 2001 until October 2002 she ran seven times and won five races in four countries. She is best known for successfully completing the Classic double of the 1,000 Guineas and the Oaks. She was the first German-bred horse to win a British Classic. After her retirement from racing she became a successful broodmare. Kazzia died in March 2013 from post-foaling complications.

== Background ==
Kazzia, described by Timeform as an "angular filly" was bred in Germany by Roswitha Grunewald. She was sired by the British-bred stallion Zinaad, winner of the Jockey Club Stakes, out of the German mare Khoruna, making her a half-sister to the Schwarzgold-Rennen winner Kimbajar. She was originally sent into training at the Bremen stable of Andreas Wöhler.

== Racing career ==
=== 2001: two-year-old season ===
Kazzia began her career in September 2001 by winning a minor race at Hoppegarten. She was then immediately stepped up to Group race company, traveling to Milan's San Siro Racecourse for the Premio Dormello. She proved herself to be a useful staying filly, catching the English-trained Kootenay a furlong from home and pulling away to win by two and a half lengths.

Her performance attracted the attention of the Godolphin team who were in Milan to watch Kutub run in the Gran Premio del Jockey Club. According to Simon Crisford, "Sheikh Mohammed was very impressed with the filly and liked her a lot so he made an offer to the owners." Kazzia was sent to join Saeed bin Suroor at the Godolphin winter base in Dubai.

=== 2002: three-year-old season ===
==== Spring ====
Whilst still in Dubai, Kazzia reportedly showed promise when finishing a close second in a private trial race to the Cherry Hinton Stakes winner Silent Honor. She was primarily regarded as a staying prospect and attracted attention as a possible Oaks winner, but Sheikh Mohammed insisted on sending her straight for the 1,000 Guineas, taking on specialist milers on fast ground. Sent off a 14/1 outsider in "dismal" conditions, Kazzia raced prominently, took the lead a furlong out, and stayed on strongly to beat Snowfire by a neck. Her rider, Frankie Dettori felt that the filly had done very well, particularly as she was essentially a stayer- "She really wants more than a mile."

==== Summer ====
The Oaks, a month later, was run on unusually soft ground, and promised to be a test of stamina. Kazzia was made favourite at 100–30, although there was strong support for the Musidora Stakes winner, Islington. Adapting well to the conditions, Kazzia went off in front and by the two-furlong pole all her opponents were struggling except for the Irish-trained Quarter Moon. Both fillies stayed on strongly, but Kazzia prevailed by half a length, with the rest of the field, including the disappointing Islington, beaten by at least fourteen lengths. The conditions were so testing that the winning time of 2:44.52 was the slowest since 1964. After the race Goldolphin's racing manager Simon Crisford spoke confidently of the filly's future: "The Triple Crown dream is alive... there's no reason why the St Leger isn't a possibility."

Kazzia had a twelve-week break before the Yorkshire Oaks which was run on much firmer ground. Her unbeaten run came to an end as she proved no match for Islington and faded into fourth place. Kazzia's connections felt that she may have been under-prepared for the race. Crisford expressed the view that they had "been a little bit too easy with her", while Richard Edmondson, writing in the Independent described her as looking "soft as putty".

==== Autumn ====
It was still intended that Kazzia should run in the St Leger, where her stamina would have been a major strength, but a foot abscess forced her late withdrawal, and she was re-routed to the Flower Bowl Invitational Stakes at Belmont Park. Carrying 118 lbs on soft ground, Kazzia'a stamina once again came to the fore, as she led from the start and held off the strong late run of the French-trained Turtle Bow by a neck, with the leading American mares Starine and England's Legend well beaten. Godolphin's American assistant trainer called Kazzia "a very game and honest filly" and a decision was made to pay a $90,000 supplementary charge to run her in the Breeders' Cup at Arlington Park.

On her final racecourse appearance, Kazzia showed uncharacteristic signs of temperament, when reluctant to enter the stalls for the Breeders' Cup Filly and Mare Turf. She led the field into the straight but faded to finish sixth, beaten just under three lengths, behind Starine.

Her retirement was announced in November, shortly after the Cartier Racing Awards ceremony.

== Race record ==
Date	Race	Dist (f)	Course	Class	Prize (£K)	Odds	Runners	Placing	Margin	Time	Jockey	Trainer
9 September 2001	Rennen de Howoge	7	Berlin-Hoppegarten	M	1	31/10	7	1	1.25	1:26.50	Eduardo Pedroza	Andreas Wöhler
14 October 2001	Premio Dormello	8	San Siro Racecourse	3	53		11	1	2.25	1:41.62	Fernando Jovine	Andreas Wöhler
5 May 2002	1,000 Guineas	8	Newmarket-Rowley	1	174	14/1	17	1	Neck	1:37.85	Frankie Dettori	Saeed Bin Suroor
7 June 2002	Oaks	12	Epsom	1	203	100/30	14	1	.5	2:44.52	Frankie Dettori	Saeed Bin Suroor
21 August 2002	Yorkshire Oaks	12	York	1	145	7/4	11	4	5.5	2:26.74	Frankie Dettori	Saeed Bin Suroor
28 September 2002	Flower Bowl Invitational Handicap	9	Belmont Park	1	308	3.05/1	9	1	Neck	2:05.22	Jorge F. Chavez	Saeed Bin Suroor
26 October 2002	Breeders' Cup Filly & Mare Turf	10	Arlington Park	1	480	10.2/1	12	6	3	2:03.57	Jorge F. Chavez	Saeed Bin Suroor

== Assessment ==
Kazzia was named European Champion Three-Year-Old Filly at the Cartier Racing Awards, although in the 2002 International Classification her rating of 119 placed her one-pound behind Islington and the Prix de Diane winner Bright Sky

She was assessed at 121 by Timeform.

== Stud career ==
Kazzia was retired to her owner's Darley Stud. She made an immediate impact as a broodmare, her first foal being the Dubai Sheema Classic winner Eastern Anthem, by Singspiel. On 11 March 2013 it was announced that Kazzia had died after giving birth to a filly foal by Dubawi (which survived) at the Dalham Hall Stud. The stud's director Liam O'Rourke called Kazzia "a wonderful racehorse, and an excellent mother, with a delightful temperament."

2004 Eastern Anthem (IRE) : Bay colt, foaled 27 February, by Singspiel (IRE) - won G1 Dubai Sheema Classic, Nad Al Sheba; 2nd G1 Grosser Preis von Baden, Baden-Baden; 2nd G1 Preis von Europa, Cologne; 3rd G1 Rheinland Pokal, Cologne

2005 - 2006 Barren

2007 Zeitoper (GB) : Brown colt (gelded), foaled 14 February, by Singspiel (IRE) - won G3 Prix de Conde, Longchamp in France 2009

2008 Moonsail (GB) : Bay filly, foaled 30 March, by Monsun (GER) - placed second twice from 4 races in England 2010/11

2009 Kailani (GB) : Bay filly, foaled 13 April, by Monsun (GER) - won 2 races in England 2011/12 including LR Pretty Polly Stakes, Newmarket

2010 Barren

2011 King's Land (GB) : Bay colt (gelded), foaled 23 January, by New Approach (IRE) - placed third from one race in England 2013

2012 Kazziana (GB) : Bay filly, foaled 10 February, by Shamardal (USA) - won 1 race and placed third only 2 starts to date in England 2015

2013 Bay filly (GB), foaled 11 March, by Dubawi (IRE)

== Pedigree ==
Pedigree of Kazzia (GER), bay mare, 1999
Sire Zinaad (GB) 1989	Shirley Heights; 1975	Mill Reef	Never Bend
Sire Zinaad (GB) 1989	Shirley Heights; 1975	Mill Reef	Milan Mill
Sire Zinaad (GB) 1989	Shirley Heights; 1975	Hardiemma	Hardicanute
Sire Zinaad (GB) 1989	Shirley Heights; 1975	Hardiemma	Grand Cross
Sire Zinaad (GB) 1989	Time Charter; 1979	Saritamer	Dancer's Image
Sire Zinaad (GB) 1989	Time Charter; 1979	Saritamer	Irish Chorus
Sire Zinaad (GB) 1989	Time Charter; 1979	Centrocon	High Line
Sire Zinaad (GB) 1989	Time Charter; 1979	Centrocon	Centro
Dam Khoruna (GER) 1991	Lagunas; 1981	Ile de Bourbon	Nijinsky
Dam Khoruna (GER) 1991	Lagunas; 1981	Ile de Bourbon	Roseliere
Dam Khoruna (GER) 1991	Lagunas; 1981	Liranga	Literat
Dam Khoruna (GER) 1991	Lagunas; 1981	Liranga	Love In
Dam Khoruna (GER) 1991	Khora; 1984	Corvaro	Vaguely Noble
Dam Khoruna (GER) 1991	Khora; 1984	Corvaro	Delmora
Dam Khoruna (GER) 1991	Khora; 1984	Kandia	Luciano
Dam Khoruna (GER) 1991	Khora; 1984	Kandia	Kronungsgabe (Family: 5-h)
