= Sadler's Wells (horse) =

American-bred, Irish-trained Thoroughbred racehorse

- Sire: Northern Dancer
- Grandsire: Nearctic
- Dam: Fairy Bridge
- Damsire: Bold Reason
- Sex: Stallion
- Foaled: 11 April 1981
- Died: 26 April 2011 (aged 30)
- Country: United States
- Colour: Bay
- Breeder: Swettenham Stud
- Owner: Robert Sangster
- Trainer: Vincent O'Brien
- Record: 11: 6–4–0
- Earnings: $663,423

Major wins
- Beresford Stakes (1983); Derrinstown Stud Derby Trial (1984); Irish 2,000 Guineas (1984); Eclipse Stakes (1984); Phoenix Champion Stakes (1984)

Awards
- Champion Miler in France (1984); Leading sire in Britain & Ireland (1990, 1992–2004); Leading sire in France (1993, 1994, 1999); Leading broodmare sire in Britain & Ireland (2005–2011); Leading broodmare sire in North America (2008–2010); Timeform rating: 132

Sadler's Wells (11 April 1981 – 26 April 2011) was an American-bred, Irish-trained champion Thoroughbred racehorse and outstanding sire. He was the 1984 European Champion miler after winning the Irish 2,000 Guineas, Eclipse Stakes and Phoenix Champion Stakes in that year. He also finished second in the French Derby and the King George VI and Queen Elizabeth Stakes.

Despite his success as a runner, it is as a sire that Sadler's Wells is best known. He was the leading sire in Great Britain and Ireland a record-setting 14 times, including 13 titles in a row. At the time of his death, he had sired 323 stakes winners. Only Danehill, who was operational across both hemispheres, sired more. Sadler's Wells was also a notable sire of sires, including Galileo and Montjeu in Europe, and El Prado in the United States. He helped reverse a trend from the middle of the twentieth century where many of Europe's most successful racehorses were exported to stand in the United States and later Japan.

== Background ==
Sadler's Wells was a bay horse with a broad white blaze and white socks on his hind legs. He was bred in the United States by Robert Sangster's Swettenham Stud and raced under Sangster's name. His owner was part of the original Coolmore partnership team with Tim Vigors and trainer Vincent O'Brien, later joined by John Magnier. They became active in the North American yearling auctions starting in the mid-1970s, purchasing and part-breeding notable horses like The Minstrel, Alleged, Golden Fleece and El Gran Senor, and creating a high demand for the offspring of Northern Dancer and Nijinsky. By the early 1980s, they were noted for paying millions of dollars for the right yearling, entering in bidding duels with Sheikh Mohammed bin Rashid Al Maktoum of Dubai

In 1976, Sangster, O'Brien and Magnier made one of their most important purchases for only $40,000 ($220,000 inflation adjusted)—a yearling filly by the little-known stallion Bold Reason. She was named Fairy Bridge and trained by O'Brien in Ireland, where she became the champion two-year-old filly of 1977. Fairy Bridge was closely related to a number of outstanding horses previously trained by O'Brien, including Thatch, Marinsky, Lisadell and Apalachee. In 1980, Fairy Bridge was sent back to America and bred to Northern Dancer, the most successful sire of his era. Sadler's Wells was her first foal. She would later also produce National Stakes winner Tate Gallery and successful breeding stallion Fairy King.

The colt was sent into training with Vincent O'Brien at Ballydoyle. Throughout his racing career, Sadler's Wells had a characteristic running style, galloping with his head at an unusually high angle. He was a well-balanced horse with good tactical speed standing 16 hands (64 inches, 163 cm) high. Even as a sire, he was noted for his laid-back, good-natured temperament, a trait he passed on to many of his offspring.

== Racing career ==
=== 1983: two-year-old season ===
Sadler's Wells made his first appearance in September at Leopardstown Racecourse in a seven-furlong maiden race. Ridden by Pat Eddery, the colt started the 1/2 favourite in a field of sixteen runners and won by six lengths from Cyrano. Three weeks later, he was moved up in class for the Group Three Beresford Stakes at the Curragh over one mile on soft ground. The horse led from the start and won by six lengths from Cerussite. In the International Classification, he was given a rating of 78, ten pounds behind the top-rated two-year-old, his stable-mate El Gran Senor.

=== 1984: three-year-old season ===
Sadler's Wells met El Gran Senor on the racecourse for the only time when he finished second to him in the seven-furlong Gladness Stakes at the Curragh. Frank McNulty, head of BBA Ireland, later commented: "I remember seeing him at the Gladness Stakes—when he walked into the ring I thought he looked absolutely magnificent, even though he was only the second string." Sadler's Wells next won the ten-furlong Derrinstown Stud Derby Trial and was then brought back in distance for the Irish 2,000 Guineas over one mile, where he was ridden by George McGrath. In a closely contested finish, he won from the French-trained Procida and the favourite Secreto. The O'Brien-trained Capture Him, whom Eddery chose to ride in preference to Sadler's Wells, finished fourth.

Instead of going for the one-mile St James's Palace Stakes at Royal Ascot, the colt was moved up in distance for the French Derby, a race O'Brien had won the previous year with Caerleon. Sadler's Wells took the lead in the straight but was overtaken in the closing stages and beaten one and a half lengths by Darshaan, with Rainbow Quest in third. In July, Sadler's Wells was the only three-year-old in a field of nine runners for the Eclipse Stakes at Sandown Park. He held off the challenge of the mare Time Charter to win by a neck. The winner was praised for his "battling" and "determined" performance against more-experienced rivals. Later that month, Sadler's Wells ran a strong second to Teenoso in the King George VI and Queen Elizabeth Stakes at Ascot.

Sadler's Wells failed to reproduce his best form when fourth in the Benson and Hedges Gold Cup at York. Two weeks later he ran in the inaugural Phoenix Champion Stakes, the most valuable race ever in Ireland. The colt held off a late challenge from Seattle Song to win by three-quarters of a length. That success took his prize money for the season to £384,114. At the time, this was the fourth-highest single-season total for any horse trained in Britain or Ireland, behind Troy (£408,424 in 1979), Tolomeo (£400,000 in 1983) and Shergar (£386,410 in 1981). On his last appearance, Sadler's Wells was sent to Longchamp in October for the Prix de l'Arc de Triomphe, where he finished eighth behind Sagace.

== Assessment ==
Sadler's Wells was given a rating of 90 by the International Classification, making him the sixth-best European horse in 1984. He earned a Timeform rating of 132 for his victory in the Eclipse Stakes. British breeder Bob McCreery would later say, "I was absolutely convinced Sadler's Wells was the real deal. I always admired his guts. He was a very tough horse, and that's one thing I've really always tried to go for, courage. He was absolutely ideal, the ideal horse."

== Stud record ==
In 1985, Sadler's Wells was syndicated by Coolmore for €800,000 a share (total value of €32m) and stood for an initial fee of IR£125,000. He was an immediate success when his first crop reached racing age in 1988, led by In the Wings and Old Vic. Two other colts from that crop, Scenic and Prince of Dance, dead-heated in the 1988 Dewhurst Stakes. In 1989 with only two crops of racing age, he set a world record by having 11 stakes winners in one year, an exceptional achievement at a time when foal crops were much smaller than today. For 1990, his stud fee increased to £150,000 with a book of 65 mares. Eamonn Phelan of Coolmore commented, "Very few stallions get offspring like themselves, but this fellow does. He's so tough and very well bred as well as being very sound."

In 1990, his daughter Salsabil won the 1000 Guineas, Epsom Oaks and Irish Derby, which helped propel Sadler's Wells to his first champion sire title. He went on to be Champion Sire in Great Britain & Ireland a record 14 times, including 13 years in a row from 1992 to 2004. The previous record of 13 titles was set by Highflyer in the 18th century.

Sadler's Wells has been called one of the most influential sires of all times, especially based on his record in the English Classic Races. He is the sire of 12 English Classic winners, a number comparable with leading sires Stockwell and St Simon from the 19th century. His English Classic winners are: Salsabil (1000 Guineas, Oaks), Intrepidity (Oaks), Moonshell (Oaks), Entrepreneur (2000 Guineas), King of Kings (2000 Guineas), Imagine (Oaks), Galileo (Derby), Milan (St Leger), High Chaparral (Derby), Brian Boru (St Leger), Refuse to Bend (2000 Guineas) and Alexandrova (Oaks). In 2001, his daughters swept the top three positions in the Oaks. He also sired 14 winners of the Irish Classics. In 1999, his sons finished one-two-three in the Irish Derby.

By 2001, his stud fee had increased to £200,000 with a book of roughly 200 mares each year. With the increased number of offspring each year, his number of stakes winners began to rapidly accelerate. Sadler's Wells briefly held the all-time record for the number of stakes winners when Roman Saddle become his 177th stakes winner in July 2001. Mr. Prospector had held the previous record with 176 stakes winners. Sadler's Wells sired his 200th stakes winner in 2002, becoming the first stallion to achieve that landmark. However, Danehill then passed him, reaching the 300 stakes winner mark in 2005, a level Sadler's Wells would achieve in 2008. At the time of his death in 2011, Sadler's Wells had sired 323 stakes winners, including 73 individual Group 1/Grade I winners on the flat. He also sired several National Hunt winners, most notably Istabraq.

=== Notable progeny ===
c = colt, f = filly, g = gelding,

Group/Grade 1 winners by Sadler's Wells
Foaled	Name	Sex	Major wins
1986	Braashee	c	Prix Royal-Oak
1986	French Glory	c	Canadian International Stakes
1986	In the Wings	c	Coronation Cup, Grand Prix de Saint-Cloud, Breeders' Cup Turf
1986	Old Vic	c	Prix du Jockey Club, Irish Derby
1986	Prince of Dance	c	Dewhurst Stakes
1986	Scenic	c	Dewhurst Stakes
1987	Salsabil	f	Prix Marcel Boussac, 1,000 Guineas, Epsom Oaks, Irish Derby, Prix Vermeille,
1988	Opera House	c	Coronation Cup, Eclipse Stakes, King George VI and Queen Elizabeth Stakes
1988	Runyon	c	Underwood Stakes
1988	Saddlers' Hall	c	Coronation Cup
1989	El Prado	c	National Stakes
1989	Johann Quatz	c	Prix Lupin
1989	Masad	c	Gran Premio d'Italia
1990	Barathea	c	Irish 2,000 Guineas, Breeders' Cup Mile
1990	Fatherland	c	National Stakes
1990	Fort Wood	c	Grand Prix de Paris
1990	Intrepidity	f	Epsom Oaks, Prix Saint-Alary, Prix Vermeille
1990	Pridwell	g	Aintree Hurdle
1991	Carnegie	c	Prix de l'Arc de Triomphe, Grand Prix de Paris
1991	Correggio	g	Breeders' Cup Grand National Steeplechase
1991	King's Theatre	c	Racing Post Trophy, King George VI and Queen Elizabeth Stakes
1991	Northern Spur	c	Breeders' Cup Turf
1991	Zaiyad	g	Grande Course de Haies d'Auteuil, Grand Prix d'Automne
1992	Dance Design	f	Irish Oaks
1992	Istabraq	g	Royal Sunalliance Novices' Hurdle, Irish Champion Hurdle (4 times), Champion Hurdle (3 times), Punchestown Champion Hurdle
1992	Moonshell	f	Epsom Oaks
1992	Muncie	f	Prix Saint-Alary
1992	Poliglote	c	Critérium de Saint-Cloud
1993	Chief Contender	c	Prix du Cadran
1993	Darazari	c	Ranvet Stakes
1993	French Ballerina	f	Supreme Novices' Hurdle
1993	Luna Wells	f	Prix Saint-Alary
1994	Ebadiyla	f	Irish Oaks, Prix Royal-Oak
1994	Entrepreneur	c	2000 Guineas
1994	In Command	c	Dewhurst Stakes
1994	Kayf Tara	c	Ascot Gold Cup (twice), Irish St. Leger (twice)
1995	Dream Well	c	Prix du Jockey Club, Irish Derby
1995	Greek Dance	c	Bayerisches Zuchtrennen
1995	Insight	f	E. P. Taylor Stakes
1995	King of Kings	c	2000 Guineas, National Stakes
1995	Leggera	f	Prix Vermeille
1996	Commander Collins	c	Racing Post Trophy
1996	Daliapour	c	Coronation Cup, Hong Kong Vase
1996	Montjeu	c	Prix du Jockey Club, Irish Derby, Arc de Triomphe, Grand Prix de Saint-Cloud, King George VI and Queen Elizabeth Stakes
1996	Saffron Walden	c	Irish 2,000 Guineas
1997	Aristotle	c	Racing Post Trophy
1997	Beat Hollow	c	Grand Prix de Paris, Turf Classic Stakes, Arlington Million
1997	Subtle Power	c	Gulfstream Park Turf Handicap
1998	Galileo	c	Epsom Derby, Irish Derby, King George VI and Queen Elizabeth Stakes
1998	Imagine	f	Irish 1,000 Guineas, Epsom Oaks
1998	Milan	c	St. Leger
1998	Perfect Soul	c	Shadwell Turf Mile Stakes
1998	Sequoyah	f	Moyglare Stud Stakes
1998	Sligo Bay	c	Hollywood Turf Cup Stakes
1999	Ballingarry	c	Critérium de Saint-Cloud, Canadian International Stakes
1999	Black Sam Bellamy	c	Gran Premio del Jockey Club, Tattersalls Gold Cup
1999	Gossamer	f	Irish 1,000 Guineas, Fillies' Mile
1999	High Chaparral	c	Racing Post Trophy, Epsom Derby, Irish Derby, Irish Champion Stakes, Breeders' Cup Turf (twice)
1999	Islington	f	Nassau Stakes, Yorkshire Oaks (twice), Breeders' Cup Filly & Mare Turf
1999	River Dancer	g	Queen Elizabeth II Cup
1999	Quarter Moon	f	Moyglare Stud Stakes
1999	Sholokhov	c	Gran Criterium
2000	Alberto Giacometti	c	Critérium de Saint-Cloud
2000	Brian Boru	c	Racing Post Trophy, St Leger Stakes
2000	Doyen	c	King George VI and Queen Elizabeth Stakes
2000	Powerscourt	c	Tattersalls Gold Cup, Arlington Million
2000	Refuse to Bend	c	National Stakes, 2000 Guineas, Queen Anne Stakes, Eclipse Stakes
2000	Yesterday	f	Irish 1,000 Guineas
2001	Percussionist	g	American Grand National
2001	Quiff	f	Yorkshire Oaks
2001	Yeats	c	Ascot Gold Cup x4, Coronation Cup, Irish St. Leger, Prix Royal-Oak
2002	Playful Act	f	Fillies' Mile
2003	Alexandrova	f	Epsom Oaks, Irish Oaks, Yorkshire Oaks
2003	Ask	c	Coronation Cup, Prix Royal-Oak
2003	Linda's Lad	c	Critérium de Saint-Cloud
2003	Saddex	c	Premio Presidente della Repubblica, Rheinland-Pokal
2003	Septimus	c	Irish St. Leger
2003	Synchronised	g	Welsh National, Lexus Chase, Cheltenham Gold Cup
2005	Listen	f	Fillies' Mile
2006	Black Bear Island	c	Dante Stakes

Sadler's Wells was also a highly successful broodmare sire, leading that category in Great Britain and Ireland from 2005 to 2010, and the United States from 2008 to 2010. By 2010, his daughters had produced more than 250 stakes winners, including 30 in 2010 alone. He is the maternal grandsire of such notable horses as:

- Conduit (St Leger).
- Gust Of Wind (2015 Australian Oaks)
- Henrythenavigator (2000 Guineas)
- Sakhee (Arc de Triomphe)
- Taghrooda (Epsom Oaks), Peeping Fawn (Champion Filly)
- Workforce (Epsom Derby, Arc de Triomphe),

In November 2007, a Sadler's Wells daughter, Playful Act, out of the mare Magnificient Style, was sold at the Keeneland breeding stock sale for a world-record price of US$10.5 million.

== Sire of sires ==
Sadler's Wells was originally considered a disappointment as a sire of sires, despite some early success by In the Wings in particular. This assessment was decisively overturned by the performance of several sons from his later crops. Sadler's Wells eventually sired 32 sons who themselves sired at least one group I or grade I winner, with 10 of them becoming the leading sire in nine different countries. Most notably, Galileo became the leading sire in Great Britain and Ireland in 2008, then won 11 titles in succession from 2010 to 2020. Montjeu was the leading sire in France for 2005, El Prado became Leading sire in North America in 2002, Fort Wood was a leading sire in South Africa, Opera House achieved success in Japan and High Chaparral became a notable sire in New Zealand and Australia.

His sons have already produced important sires themselves, ensuring Sadler's Wells legacy will continue for years to come. Galileo's sire sons include Frankel, Teofilo, New Approach and Nathaniel (sire of two time Prix de l'Arc de Triomphe winner Enable). Montjeu sired Motivator (sire of two time Prix de l'Arc de Triomphe winner Treve) and Camelot (the leading 2nd Crop sire in Europe in 2018 and 3rd Crop Sire in Europe in 2019). El Prado sired Medaglia d'Oro (sire of American Horse of the Year Rachel Alexandra) and Kitten's Joy, the leading sire in North America in 2013 and 2018.

== Retirement ==
On 13 May 2008 Coolmore announced that Sadler's Wells was retiring from breeding due to declining fertility. Bill Oppenheim, a columnist with Thoroughbred Daily News, wrote that Sadler's Wells "singlehandedly restored the reputation of Europe as a place where you could stand world-class stallions after European stallion ranks had been decimated by the Americans in the 1970s and 1980s." In 2009, Sadler's Wells was the first horse to be entered into the Irish Thoroughbred Breeder Association's Hall of Fame.

Sadler's Wells died peacefully on 26 April 2011 due to natural causes at Coolmore Stud, two weeks after his 30th birthday. Breeding industry expert Andrew Caulfield stated: "Superlatives are greatly overused in the world of sport, but no-one could begrudge their being used about Sadler's Wells, with his phenomenal record of 14 sires' championships in the space of 15 years. No stallion has come close to such dominance in Britain and Ireland – not even the legendary stallions which operated during the much less competitive eras of the 18th and 19th centuries. He was also dominant in that it was usually easy to spot one of his progeny. A dominant bay who sometimes passed on his prominent blaze and a sock or two, he also became synonymous with soundness and dependability."

The horse's skeleton is on display in Fethard Horse Country Experience museum, which is located in Fethard Town Hall, not far from Coolmore Stud.

== Pedigree ==
Sadler's Wells was sired by Northern Dancer, who has been called the dominant progenitor of the breed in the twentieth century. In his second crop foaled in 1967, Northern Dancer sired Nijinsky, who would win the English Triple Crown and become an outstanding sire. This made Northern Dancer the focus of a bloodstock boom in the 1970s and 1980s, where his progeny would sell for millions of dollars. Northern Dancer's other important offspring included Derby winners The Minstrel and Secreto and the brilliant El Gran Senor and Nureyev.

Sadler's Wells was out of Fairy Bridge, who was sold as a yearling in 1976 at the Keeneland Sales to Sangster for $40,000 and became the Irish champion two-year-old filly of 1977. Sadler's Wells was her first live foal, followed by his full siblings Fairy King (who also became a successful sire despite injuring himself in his only race) and stakes winners Tate Gallery, Fairy Gold and Puppet Dance. Her final foal was Perugino, by Danzig, who became a sire in Australia. Fairy Bridge was the second foal of the mare Special, a full sister to European champion sprinter/miler Thatch and Lisadell, who won the Coronation Stakes at Royal Ascot, and a half-sister to Grade 1 winner, King Pellinore, and the brilliant but ill-fated Marinsky, who finished first in the 1977 July Cup at Newmarket. Special later produced Nureyev, the 1980 French champion miler and an outstanding sire, and the stakes winning fillies Number and Bound, who would themselves became successful producers.

Pedigree of Sadler's Wells (USA), bay stallion, 1981
Sire Northern Dancer (CAN) 1961	Nearctic (CAN); 1954	Nearco	Pharos
Sire Northern Dancer (CAN) 1961	Nearctic (CAN); 1954	Nearco	Nogara
Sire Northern Dancer (CAN) 1961	Nearctic (CAN); 1954	Lady Angela	Hyperion
Sire Northern Dancer (CAN) 1961	Nearctic (CAN); 1954	Lady Angela	Sister Sarah
Sire Northern Dancer (CAN) 1961	Natalma (USA); 1957	Native Dancer	Polynesian
Sire Northern Dancer (CAN) 1961	Natalma (USA); 1957	Native Dancer	Geisha
Sire Northern Dancer (CAN) 1961	Natalma (USA); 1957	Almahmoud	Mahmoud
Sire Northern Dancer (CAN) 1961	Natalma (USA); 1957	Almahmoud	Arbitrator
Dam Fairy Bridge (USA) 1975	Bold Reason (USA); 1968	Hail to Reason	Turn-To
Dam Fairy Bridge (USA) 1975	Bold Reason (USA); 1968	Hail to Reason	Nothirdchance
Dam Fairy Bridge (USA) 1975	Bold Reason (USA); 1968	Lalun	Djeddah
Dam Fairy Bridge (USA) 1975	Bold Reason (USA); 1968	Lalun	Be Faithful
Dam Fairy Bridge (USA) 1975	Special (USA); 1969	Forli	Aristophanes
Dam Fairy Bridge (USA) 1975	Special (USA); 1969	Forli	Trevisa
Dam Fairy Bridge (USA) 1975	Special (USA); 1969	Thong	Nantallah
Dam Fairy Bridge (USA) 1975	Special (USA); 1969	Thong	Rough Shod (Family 5-h)

== See also ==
- List of racehorses
