= Bold Reason =

American-bred Thoroughbred racehorse

- Sire: Hail To Reason
- Grandsire: Turn-To
- Dam: Lalun
- Damsire: Djeddah
- Sex: Stallion
- Foaled: 1968
- Country: United States
- Colour: Bay
- Breeder: Harry F. Guggenheim
- Owner: William A. Levin
- Trainer: Angel Penna, Sr.
- Record: 17: 7-4-2
- Earnings: $304,082

Major wins
- American Derby (1971); Hollywood Derby (1971); Lexington Handicap (1971); Travers Stakes (1971)

Awards
- Leading broodmare sire in Britain & Ireland (1984)
- Last updated on September 16, 2009

Bold Reason (1968–1985) was an American Thoroughbred racehorse and Champion broodmare sire.

== Background ==
Bold Reason was bred by Harry Guggenheim, and was sired by Hail To Reason, the 1970 Leading sire in North America. His dam was Guggenheim's Lalun, who also produced Never Bend. He was bought as a yearling for $52,000 by William Levin at the 1969 Guggenheim dispersal sale, and was trained by Angel Penna Sr.

== Racing career ==
As a three-year-old competing in the 1971 U.S. Triple Crown series, Bold Reason ran third in the Kentucky Derby, fifth in the Preakness Stakes, and third in the Belmont Stakes. After the Triple Crown races, Bold Reason picked up two wins on turf at Belmont Park. He then ran in the Hollywood Derby, winning by 2 and a half lengths over Jim French. Bold Reason went on to win the Lexington Stakes and the American Derby. Following the American Derby, he was syndicated for $3.2 million. He then went on to win the Travers Stakes.

Bold Reason was entered in the Woodward Stakes, but was scratched after missing a number of workouts due to a bad knee. His trainer hoped that he would recover in time for the Baltimore Washington International Turf Cup, but Bold Reason never fully recovered, and was retired.

== Later life ==
Retired to stud duty, Bold Reason spent two seasons at Robin's Nest Farm before being moved to Claiborne Farm. He was the leading broodmare sire in Great Britain & Ireland in 1984. Of his daughters' progeny, the most important was Sadler's Wells.

Bold Reason died on November 14, 1985, at Samantha Farms in Old Westbury, New York.
