= Ballydoyle =

Racehorse training facility in Ireland

Coordinates: 52°27′40″N 7°49′38″W

Ballydoyle is a racehorse training facility located in County Tipperary in Ireland. It is a sister thoroughbred facility to Coolmore Stud, and both are owned by John Magnier, son in law to the racehorse trainer Vincent O'Brien. The current trainer at Ballydoyle is Aidan O'Brien, who succeeded Vincent O'Brien (no relation) in 1995. The current stable retained jockey is Ryan Moore.

== History ==
After the 1951 Cheltenham Festival, Vincent O'Brien purchased and moved into Ballydoyle, then a 285-acre (1.15 km^{2}) farm ringed by mountains near the village of Rosegreen, County Tipperary.

Vincent O'Brien trained such household names as Nijinsky, Ballymoss, Sir Ivor, Roberto, Alleged, The Minstrel, El Gran Senor and Sadler's Wells at Ballydoyle. There is a bronze statue of Nijinsky at the stables.

== Today ==
Aidan O'Brien has measured up to those high standards by training many known horses, such as Rock of Gibraltar, Galileo, High Chaparral and George Washington.

The recently opened Giants Causeway stable (named after the champion racehorse who was resident at Ballydoyle) is well equipped. Given that the bloodstock is very valuable, security is very tight at Ballydoyle and the yard is not open for visitors.
