= 1985 Epsom Derby =

- Derby
- Location: Epsom Downs Racecourse
- Date: 5 June 1985
- Winning horse: Slip Anchor
- Starting price: 9/4 Fav
- Jockey: Steve Cauthen
- Trainer: Henry Cecil
- Owner: John Scott-Ellis, 9th Baron Howard de Walden
- Conditions: Good

Epsom Derby 1985
1-2-3
Slip Anchor	Law Society	Damister

Also Ran
4-5-6
Supreme Leader	Lanfranco	Reach
7-8-9
Theatrical	Phardante	Royal Harmony
10-11-12
Snow Plant	Petoski	Seurat
13-14
Shadeed	Main Reason	14 Ran

The 1985 Epsom Derby (known as the Ever Ready Derby for sponsorship reasons) was the 206th annual running of the Derby horse race. It took place at Epsom Downs Racecourse on 5 June 1985.

The race was won by Lord Howard de Walden's Slip Anchor, at odds of 9/4 ridden by jockey Steve Cauthen and trained at Newmarket by Henry Cecil. The win was a first success in the race for owner, trainer and jockey. Cauthen became the first man to ride the winners of both the Kentucky Derby and the Epsom Derby.

== Race details ==
- Sponsor: Ever Ready
- Winner's prize money: £204,160
- Going: Good
- Number of runners: 14
- Winner's time: 2 minutes, 36.23 seconds

== Full result ==
	Dist *	Horse	Jockey	Trainer	SP
1		Slip Anchor	Steve Cauthen	Henry Cecil	9-4
2	7	Law Society	Pat Eddery	Vincent O'Brien (IRE)	5-1
3	6	Damister	Yves Saint-Martin	Jeremy Tree	16-1
4	sh hd	Supreme Leader	Philip Robinson	Clive Brittain	10-1
5	4	Lanfranco	Cash Asmussen	Henry Cecil	14-1
6	7	Reach	Richard Quinn	Paul Cole	33-1
7	¾	Theatrical	Lester Piggott	Dermot Weld (IRE)	10-1
8	nk	Phardante	Greville Starkey	Guy Harwood	40-1
9	8	Royal Harmony	Michael Hills	Barry Hills	40-1
10	6	Snow Plant	Gabriel Curran	Kevin Prendergast (IRE)	100-1
11	4	Petoski	Willie Carson	Dick Hern	33-1
12	7	Seurat	Éric Legrix	Patrick-Louis Biancone (FR)	33-1
13		Shadeed	Walter Swinburn	Michael Stoute	7-2
14		Main Reason	Philip Waldron	Paul Cole	200-1

== Winner details ==
Further details of the winner, Slip Anchor:

- Foaled: 15 April 1982, in United Kingdom
- Sire: Shirley Heights; Dam: Sayonara (Birkhahn)
- Owner: Lord Howard de Walden
- Breeder: Lord Howard de Walden

== Form analysis ==
=== Two-year-old races ===
Notable runs by the future Derby participants as two-year-olds in 1984:

- Damister – 1st in Somerville Tattersall Stakes, 2nd in William Hill Futurity
- Lanfranco – 1st in William Hill Futurity
- Law Society – 1st in Anglesey Stakes, 1st in National Stakes, 2nd in Dewhurst Stakes
- Petoski – 1st in Lanson Champagne Stakes, 3rd in Champagne Stakes
- Reach – 1st in Royal Lodge Stakes
- Royal Harmony – 2nd in Acomb Stakes, 3rd in Royal Lodge Stakes

=== The road to Epsom ===
Early-season appearances in 1985 and trial races prior to running in the Derby:

- Damister – 2nd in Craven Stakes, 1st in Sandown Classic Trial, 1st in Dante Stakes
- Lanfranco – 1st in Predominate Stakes
- Law Society – 1st in Chester Vase
- Petoski – 2nd in Sandown Classic Trial, 2nd in Chester Vase
- Phardante – 2nd in Predominate Stakes
- Reach – 3rd in Dante Stakes
- Seurat – 1st in Prix Jean de Chaudenay
- Shadeed – 1st in Craven Stakes, 1st in 2,000 Guineas Stakes
- Slip Anchor – 1st in Heathorn Stakes, 1st in Lingfield Derby Trial
- Supreme Leader – 3rd in 2,000 Guineas Stakes
- Theatrical – 1st in Ballysax Stakes, 1st in Derrinstown Stud Derby Trial

=== Subsequent Group 1 wins ===
Group 1 / Grade I victories after running in the Derby.

- Petoski – King George VI and Queen Elizabeth Stakes (1985)
- Law Society – Irish Derby (1985)
- Theatrical – Hialeah Turf Cup Handicap (1987), Man o' War Stakes (1987), Turf Classic Invitational Stakes (1987), Breeders' Cup Turf (1987)

== Subsequent breeding careers ==
Leading progeny of participants in the 1985 Epsom Derby.

=== Sires of Classic winners ===
Slip Anchor (1st)

- User Friendly – 1st Epsom Oaks, 1st Irish Oaks, 1st St Leger Stakes (1992)
- Morshdi – 1st Derby Italiano (2001)
- Stowaway – 1st Great Voltigeur Stakes (1997)
- Posidonas – 1st Gran Premio d'Italia (1995)

Theatrical (7th)

- Zagreb – 1st Irish Derby (1996)
- Madeline's Dream – 1st Poule d'Essai des Pouliches (1993)
- Royal Anthem – 1st International Stakes (1999)
- Stage Affair – 2nd Irish Champion Hurdle (2000)

Shadeed (13th)

- Shadayid – 1st 1000 Guineas Stakes (1991)
- Sayyedati – 1st 1000 Guineas Stakes (1993)
- Alydeed – 1st Queen's Plate (1992), 2nd Preakness Stakes (1992)
- Citadeed – 3rd Belmont Stakes (1995)

Damister (3rd)

- Celtic Swing – 1st Prix du Jockey Club (1995)
- Trot Star – 1st Sprinters Stakes (2001)
- Pennyweight Point – 3rd Fruit 'n' Veg Stakes (1998)
- In the Saltmine – Dam of Jazz Messenger

=== Sires of Group/Grade One winners ===
Law Society (2nd) – Damsire of five classic winners – Scorpion, Love Divine, Manhattan Cafe, Moonstone and Brametot

- Anzillero – 1st Deutschland-Preis (2001)
- Court Of Honour – 1st Gran Premio del Jockey Club (1995)
- Homme de Loi – 1st Grand Prix de Paris (1992)
- Catch Me – 1st Hatton's Grace Hurdle (2008)

Lanfranco (5th)

- Ligeiro – 1st Auckland Cup (1993)
- Super Franky – 1st Munster National (2000)

=== Sires of National Hunt horses ===
Supreme Leader (4th)

- Rule Supreme – 1st Grande Course de Haies d'Auteuil (2004), 1st Hennessy Cognac Gold Cup (2005)
- Keen Leader – 1st Tommy Whittle Chase (2003)
- Fundamentalist – 1st Royal & SunAlliance Novices' Hurdle (2004)
- Snob's Supreme – dam of Macs Joy

Phardante (8th)

- Bog Frog – 1st Grande Course de Haies d'Auteuil (1997)
- Truckers Tavern – 2nd Cheltenham Gold Cup (2003)
- Hanakham – 1st Royal Sun Alliance Chase (1997)
- La Noire – dam of Jezki, Jetson, Jett, Jered and Jenari

=== Other stallions ===
Petoski (11th) – Night Petticoat (1st Preis der Diana 1996 – dam of Next Desert and Next Gina), Mouseski (12 wins over jumps)
Reach (6th) – Minor flat and jumps winners – later exported to Japan
Seurat (12th) – Minor flat and jumps winners in France
Royal Harmony (9th) – Exported to Brazil
