= Superlative Stakes =

Flat horse race in Britain

- Class: Group 2
- Location: July Course; Newmarket, England
- Race type: Flat / Thoroughbred
- Sponsor: Bet365
- Website: Newmarket

Race information
- Distance: 7f (1,408 metres)
- Surface: Turf
- Track: Straight
- Qualification: Two-year-olds
- Weight: 9 st 1 lb Allowances; 3 lb for fillies Penalties; 3 lb for G1 / G2 winners
- Purse: £97,000 (2022); 1st: £56,710

Superlative Stakes
2026
Al Hudaiba	Abraham Lincoln	Pikachu

Previous years
2025
Saba Desert	Italy	Wild Desert
2024
Ancient Truth	Seagulls Eleven	Wimbledon Hawkeye
2023
City Of Troy	Haatem	Oddyssey
2022
Isaac Shelby	Victory Dance	Dark Thirty
2021
Native Trail	Masekela	Dhabab

2020-2011
2020
Master Of The Seas	Devious Company	Seventh Kingdom
2019
Mystery Power	Juan Elcano	Maxi Boy
2018
Quorto	Cape Of Good Hope	Neverland Rock
2017
Gustav Klimt	Nebo	Great Prospector
2016
Boynton	War Decree	Mr Scaramanga
2015
Birchwood	Air Vice Marshal	Tony Curtis
2014
Estidhkaar	Aktabantay	Cock Of The North
2013
Good Old Boy Lukey	Somewhat	Washaar
2012
Olympic Glory	Birdman	Maxentius
2011
Red Duke	Chandlery	Silverheels

2010-2001
2010
King Torus	Ecliptic	Klammer
2009
Silver Grecian	Roi De Vitesse	Shakespearean
2008
Firth Of Fifth	Weald Park	Shaweel
2007
Hatta Fort	Declaration Of War	Ellmau
2006
Halicarnassus	He's A Decoy	Admiralofthefleet
2005
Horatio Nelson	Leo	Yasoodd
2004
Dubawi	Henrik	Wilko
2003
Kings Point	Chester Le Street	King Hesperus
2002
Surbiton	Magistretti	Celtic Sapphire
2001
Redback	Terfel	Imtiyaz

2000-1991
2000
Vacamonte	Shadowless	Bonnard
1999
Thady Quill	Full Flow	Launfal
1998
Commander Collins	Rhapsodist	Dehoush
1997
Baltic State	Silent Tribute	Arawak Cay
1996
Recondite	Boojum	Simple Logic
1995
Allied Forces	Mons	Dovebrace
1994
Fleet Hill	The Jotter	Unanimous Vote
1993
Bal Harbour	Shepton Mallet	Governor George
1992
Ardkinglass	White Crown	Humam
1991
Dr Devious	Young Senor	Jammaayil

1990-1988
1990
Hokusai	Jameelaty	Jaffa Line
1989
Be My Chief	Long Island	Balla Cove
1988
Samoan	Stone Flake	Jacamar

The Superlative Stakes is a Group 2 flat horse race in Great Britain open to two-year-old horses. It is run on the July Course at Newmarket over a distance of 7 furlongs (1,408 metres), and it is scheduled to take place each year in July.

== History ==
The event was formerly known as the Bernard van Cutsem Stakes. It was named in memory of Bernard van Cutsem, a successful racehorse trainer who died in 1975.

The race was renamed the Superlative Stakes in 1991 to honour Superlative, a splendidly tough two-year-old in 1983, trained by Bill O'Gorman and owned by Mrs Poh-Lian Yong, who won the July Stakes and Flying Childers Stakes, and 'reached the frame' in three Group 1 contests - Prix Robert Papin(2nd), Middle Park Stakes(2nd), Dewhurst Stakes(4th).

For a period the Superlative Stakes held Listed status. It was upgraded to Group 3 level in 2003, and to Group 2 in 2006. It is currently staged on the final day of Newmarket's three-day July Festival meeting.

== Records ==
Leading jockey (6 wins):

- Steve Cauthen – Elegant Air (1983), Faustus (1985), Suhailie (1986), Samoan (1988), Be My Chief (1989), Hokusai (1990)

(5 wins):

- Pat Eddery – Rhodie Blake (1975), Undercut (1987), Ardkinglass (1992), Bal Harbour (1993), Allied Forces (1995)

Leading trainer (13 wins):

- Sir Henry Cecil – Lyphard's Wish (1978), Padalco (1981), Pacific Mail (1984), Faustus (1985), Suhailie (1986), Samoan (1988), Be My Chief (1989), Hokusai (1990), Ardkinglass (1992), Bal Harbour (1993), Allied Forces (1995), Baltic State (1997), Vacamonte (2000)

== Winners ==
Year	Winner	Jockey	Trainer	Time
1972	Great Love	Willie Carson	Bernard van Cutsem	1:29.10
1973	Meon Hill	John Gorton	Bruce Hobbs	1:31.10
1974	Hobnob	Greville Starkey	Harry Wragg	1:28.41
1975	Rhodie Blake	Pat Eddery	Bruce Hobbs	1:29.43
1976	Paddington	Lester Piggott	Noel Murless	1:31.78
1977	Shirley Heights	Ron Hutchinson	John Dunlop	1:26.71
1978	Lyphard's Wish	Joe Mercer	Henry Cecil	1:27.55
1979	Paradise Bay	Willie Carson	Dick Hern	1:28.83
1980	Rahway	Eddie Hide	Bruce Hobbs	1:30.91
1981	Padalco	Lester Piggott	Henry Cecil	1:30.45
1982	Thug	Brian Taylor	Jeremy Hindley	1:27.35
1983	Elegant Air	Steve Cauthen	Ian Balding	1:32.37
1984	Pacific Mail	Lester Piggott	Henry Cecil	1:27.83
1985	Faustus	Steve Cauthen	Henry Cecil	1:26.23
1986	Suhailie	Steve Cauthen	Henry Cecil	1:26.86
1987	Undercut	Pat Eddery	Guy Harwood	1:24.98
1988	Samoan	Steve Cauthen	Henry Cecil	1:29.14
1989	Be My Chief	Steve Cauthen	Henry Cecil	1:26.66
1990	Hokusai	Steve Cauthen	Henry Cecil	1:26.78
1991	Dr Devious	Willie Carson	Peter Chapple-Hyam	1:26.48
1992	Ardkinglass	Pat Eddery	Henry Cecil	1:26.07
1993	Bal Harbour	Pat Eddery	Henry Cecil	1:29.26
1994	Fleet Hill	Frankie Dettori	Mick Channon	1:25.41
1995	Allied Forces	Pat Eddery	Henry Cecil	1:27.84
1996	Recondite	Kevin Darley	Mick Channon	1:26.64
1997	Baltic State	Kieren Fallon	Henry Cecil	1:26.96
1998	Commander Collins	John Reid	Peter Chapple-Hyam	1:25.74
1999	Thady Quill	Michael Kinane	Aidan O'Brien	1:25.87
2000	Vacamonte	Richard Quinn	Henry Cecil	1:26.95
2001	Redback	Richard Hughes	Richard Hannon Sr.	1:26.63
2002	Surbiton	Michael Hills	Barry Hills	1:26.96
2003	Kings Point	Richard Hughes	Richard Hannon Sr.	1:24.42
2004	Dubawi	Frankie Dettori	Saeed bin Suroor	1:26.48
2005	Horatio Nelson	Kieren Fallon	Aidan O'Brien	1:26.40
2006	Halicarnassus	Tony Culhane	Mick Channon	1:26.02
2007	Hatta Fort	Hugh Bowman	Mick Channon	1:25.91
2008	Firth of Fifth	Richard Kingscote	Tom Dascombe	1:26.15
2009	Silver Grecian	Michael Hills	John Ryan	1:24.37
2010	King Torus	Richard Hughes	Richard Hannon Sr.	1:26.24
2011	Red Duke	Kieren Fallon	John Quinn	1:24.57
2012	Olympic Glory	Richard Hughes	Richard Hannon Sr.	1:32.19
2013	Good Old Boy Lukey	Ryan Moore	Richard Fahey	1:24.58
2014	Estidhkaar	Paul Hanagan	Richard Hannon Jr.	1:26.73
2015	Birchwood	James Doyle	Richard Fahey	1:23.33
2016	Boynton	Adam Kirby	Charlie Appleby	1:24.86
2017	Gustav Klimt	Ryan Moore	Aidan O'Brien	1:25.39
2018	Quorto	William Buick	Charlie Appleby	1:25.48
2019	Mystery Power	Oisin Murphy	Richard Hannon Jr.	1:23.59
2020	Master of The Seas	William Buick	Charlie Appleby	1:23.95
2021	Native Trail	William Buick	Charlie Appleby	1:25.37
2022	Isaac Shelby	Sean Levey	Brian Meehan	1:25.13
2023	City of Troy	Ryan Moore	Aidan O'Brien	1:26.03
2024	Ancient Truth	William Buick	Charlie Appleby	1:25.28
2025	Saba Desert	William Buick	Charlie Appleby	1:26.30
2026	Al Hudaiba	William Buick	Charlie Appleby	1:24.29

== See also ==
- Horse racing in Great Britain
- List of British flat horse races
