= Balla Cove =

Irish-bred Thoroughbred racehorse

- Sire: Ballad Rock
- Grandsire: Bold Lad (IRE)
- Dam: Coven
- Damsire: Sassafras
- Sex: Stallion
- Foaled: 18 March 1987
- Country: United Kingdom
- Colour: Bay
- Breeder: Mrs V McCalmont
- Owner: J Ellis; Harvey Cohen; King Brothers Stable & Royal T Stable
- Trainer: Ron Boss; Wallace Dollase; Ron McAnally; Jerry Hollendorfer
- Record: 31: 4-3-4
- Earnings: $296,236

Major wins
- Middle Park Stakes (1989); Los Feliz Stakes (1990)

Balla Cove (foaled 18 March 1987) was an Irish-bred Thoroughbred racehorse and sire who competed in Britain and the United States. He was at his best as a two-year-old in 1989 when he was placed in the Bernard Van Cutsem Stakes and the Solario Stakes before recording an upset victory in the Middle Park Stakes and running creditably on dirt in the Breeders' Cup Juvenile. He was then transferred to race in the United States where he ran consistently without recapturing his best juvenile form, recording two minor wins in twenty-three starts over the next two seasons. He was retired from racing to become a breeding stallion in Ireland but made little impact as a sire of winners.

== Background ==
Balla Cove was a bay horse with a mall white star bred in Ireland by Mrs V McAlmont. The colt was sent into training with Ron Boss who operated from the Phoenix Lodge stable in Newmarket, Suffolk. Boss had ridden for Noel Murless in the 1950s and then worked as head lad for his fellow Welshman Ifor Lewis before taking out a trainer's license in 1972.

Balla Cove's sire Ballad Rock was an Irish sprinter whose best win came in the Greenlands Stakes. At stud, Ballad Rock suffered from health problems which limited his fertility but his career as breeding stallion was revived by the success of the outstanding sprinter-miler Chief Singer and he went on to sire several other good winners including Rock City (Gimcrack Stakes), Rafferty's Rules (Hopeful Stakes) and Stack Rock (runner-up in the Prix de l'Abbaye). Balla Cove was one of several winners produced by Coven. She was a female-line descendant of the Irish Oaks winner Agars Plough, the ancestor of many other major winners including Halling, Mastery, Kingsbarns and Dark Angel.

== Racing career ==
=== 1989: two-year-old season ===
Balla Cove made his first appearance in a five furlong maiden race at Newmarket Racecourse on 6 May and finished third of the six runners, four lengths behind the winner Able Express. Three weeks later in a maiden at Doncaster Racecourse he was moved up to six furlongs and finished second to Be My Chief. He dead-heated for fifth in a maiden at Haydock Park in June and was then stepped up in class and distance for the Listed Bernard Van Cutsem Stakes over seven furlongs at Newmarket in July and finished third to Be My Chief. At Salisbury Racecourse he started at odds of 12/1 for the Whitchurch Stakes in which he was ridden by Steve Cauthen. He recorded his first victory as he took the lead from the start and won by two lengths from the Guy Harwood-trained favourite Digression (later to win the Royal Lodge Stakes).

In the Solario Stakes at Sandown Park Racecourse on 18 August Balla Cove led until the last quarter mile but was then overtaken and finished last of the three runners behind Be My Chief and Robellation. On 5 October the colt was dropped back in distance for the Group One Middle Park Stakes over six furlongs at Newmarket in which he started a 20/1 outsider in a six-runner field. The Michael Stoute-trained Cordoba was made the odds-on favourite ahead of Rock City (winner of the Coventry Stakes, July Stakes and Gimcrack Stakes) whilst the other three runner were Batzushka, Duck and Dive (runner-up in the Phoenix Stakes) and Croupier. Ridden by Cauthen, he tracked the early leader Batuhka before going to the front approaching the last quarter mile and stayed on well to win by two lengths from Rock City.

For his final appearance of the year, Balla Cove was sent to Florida to contest the Breeders' Cup Juvenile on dirt at Gulfstream Park on 4 November. He set the early pace and reached the final turn in third before finishing seventh of the twelve runners behind Rhythm, one place behind Pleasant Tap and one place ahead of Go and Go.

=== 1990: three-year-old season ===
Balla Cove stayed in the United States after his run in the Breeders' Cup and was trained by several different handlers including Wallace Dollase, Ron McAnally, William Cesare and Jerry Hollendorfer. Racing mainly in California as a three-year-old he began his campaign by dead-heating with Land Rush in the Los Feliz Stakes at Santa Anita Park in January with Farma Way in fourth. His jockey Laffit Pincay commented "Into the stretch, I tried to make him switch leads, but he wouldn't. There were some nice horses in there and he hung on pretty well."

In his subsequent starts that year he finished unplaced behind Mister Frisky in the Santa Anita Derby, third behind Itsallgreektome in the Grade III Will Rogers Handicap at Hollywood Park Racetrack in May and won the Round Table Handicap at Bay Meadows in September. He finished unplaced in his other seven races.

=== 1991: four-year-old season ===
Balla Cove remained in training as a four-year-old but failed to win in twelve starts. His best performances were second-place finishes in the Royal Owl Handicap at Santa Anita in January and a strongly contested allowance race at Arlington Park in August. He ended his racing career by running fourth in an allowance at Bay Meadows on 1 December.

== Stud record ==
After his retirement from racing Balla Cove became a breeding stallion. He sired no top-class performers but got several minor winners on the flat and over jumps.

== Pedigree ==
Pedigree of Balla Cove (IRE), bay stallion, 1987
| Sire Ballad Rock (GB) 1974 | Bold Lad (IRE); 1964 | Bold Ruler | Nasrullah |
| Sire Ballad Rock (GB) 1974 | Bold Lad (IRE); 1964 | Bold Ruler | Miss Disco |
| Sire Ballad Rock (GB) 1974 | Bold Lad (IRE); 1964 | Barn Pride | Democratic |
| Sire Ballad Rock (GB) 1974 | Bold Lad (IRE); 1964 | Barn Pride | Fair Alycia |
| Sire Ballad Rock (GB) 1974 | True Rocket (IRE); 1967 | Roan Rocket | Buisson Ardent |
| Sire Ballad Rock (GB) 1974 | True Rocket (IRE); 1967 | Roan Rocket | Farandole |
| Sire Ballad Rock (GB) 1974 | True Rocket (IRE); 1967 | True Course | Hill Gail |
| Sire Ballad Rock (GB) 1974 | True Rocket (IRE); 1967 | True Course | Arctic Rullah |
| Dam Coven (IRE) 1977 | Sassafras (FR); 1967 | Sheshoon | Precipitation |
| Dam Coven (IRE) 1977 | Sassafras (FR); 1967 | Sheshoon | Noorani |
| Dam Coven (IRE) 1977 | Sassafras (FR); 1967 | Ruta | Ratification |
| Dam Coven (IRE) 1977 | Sassafras (FR); 1967 | Ruta | Dame d'Atour |
| Dam Coven (IRE) 1977 | Alice Kyteler (IRE); 1971 | Crepello | Donatello |
| Dam Coven (IRE) 1977 | Alice Kyteler (IRE); 1971 | Crepello | Crepuscule |
| Dam Coven (IRE) 1977 | Alice Kyteler (IRE); 1971 | Belitis | Tudor Melody |
| Dam Coven (IRE) 1977 | Alice Kyteler (IRE); 1971 | Belitis | Mesopotamia (Family: 10-c) |
