= Futurity Trophy =

Flat horse race in Britain

- Class: Group 1
- Location: Doncaster Racecourse; Doncaster, England
- Inaugurated: 1961
- Race type: Flat / Thoroughbred
- Website: Doncaster

Race information
- Distance: 1 mile (1,609 metres)
- Surface: Turf
- Track: Straight
- Qualification: Two-year-olds excluding geldings
- Weight: 9 st 3 lb Allowances; 3 lb for fillies
- Purse: £200,000 (2025); 1st: £113,420

Racing Post Trophy
2026
Giant Sequoia	Gran Dia	Noble Exhibit

Previous years
2025
Hawk Mountain	Action	Benvenuto Cellini
2024
Hotazhell	Delacroix	Wimbledon Hawkeye
2023
Ancient Wisdom	Devil's Point	God's Window
2022
Auguste Rodin	Epictetus	Holloway Boy
2021
Luxembourg	Sissoko	Bayside Boy

2020-2011
2020
Mac Swiney	One Ruler	Baradar
2019
Kameko	Innisfree	Year Of The Tiger
2018
Magna Grecia	Phoenix Of Spain	Western Australia
2017
Saxon Warrior	Roaring Lion	The Pentagon
2016
Rivet	Yucatan	Salouen
2015
Marcel	Johannes Vermeer	Foundation
2014
Elm Park	Aloft	Celestial Path
2013
Kingston Hill	Johann Strauss	Altruistic
2012
Kingsbarns	Van Der Neer	Steeler
2011
Camelot	Zip Top	Fencing

2010-2001
2010
Casamento	Seville	Master Of Hounds
2009
St Nicholas Abbey	Elusive Pimpernel	Al Zir
2008
Crowded House	Jukebox Jury	Skanky Biscuit
2007
Ibn Khaldun	City Leader	Feared In Flight
2006
Authorized	Charlie Farnsbarns	Medicine Path
2005
Palace Episode	Winged Cupid	Septimus
2004
Motivator	Albert Hall	Henrik
2003
American Post	Fantastic View	Magritte
2002
Brian Boru	Powerscourt	Illustrator
2001
High Chaparral	Castle Gandolfo	Redback

2000-1991
2000
Dilshaan	Tamburlaine	Bonnard
1999
Aristotle	Lermontov	Ekraar
1998
Commander Collins	Magno	Housemaster
1997
Saratoga Springs	Mudeer	Mutamam
1996
Medaaly	Poteen	Benny The Dip
1995
Beauchamp King	Even Top	Mons
1994
Celtic Swing	Annus Mirabilis	Juyush
1993
King's Theatre	Fairy Heights	Bude
1991
Seattle Rhyme	Mack The Knife	Assessor

1990-1980
1990
Peter Davies	Mukaddamah	Marcham
1989
Be My Chief	Baligh	Qathif
1988
Al Hareb	Zalazl	Frequent Flyer
1987
Emmson	Sheriff's Star	Salse
1986
Reference Point	Bengal Fire	Love the Groom
1985
Bakharoff	Nomrood	Water Cay
1984
Lanfranco	Damister	Brave Bambino
1983
Alphabatim	Mendez	Ilium
1982
Dunbeath	Cock Robin	Lyphard's Special
1981
Count Pahlen	Paradis Terrestre	Jalmood
1980
Beldale Flutter	Shergar	Sheer Grit

The Futurity Trophy is a Group 1 flat horse race in Great Britain open to two-year-old thoroughbred colts and fillies. It is run at Doncaster over a distance of 1 mile (1,609 metres), and it is scheduled to take place each year in late October.

== History ==
The event was established in 1961 and was originally called the Timeform Gold Cup. It was founded by Phil Bull, the creator of Timeform, and was backed by this organisation until 1964.

The Observer started to support the event in 1965. The present grading system was introduced in 1971 and the Observer Gold Cup was classed at Group-1 level.

The bookmaker William Hill took over the sponsorship in 1976, and from this point the event was known as the Futurity Stakes. From 1989 to 2017 the race was sponsored by the Racing Post and run as the Racing Post Trophy. William Hill reestablished their race partnership in 2024 with the official title now the William Hill Futurity Trophy Stakes.

Up to 2000 the race was run on the round mile from 2001 it was run on the Straight Mile

The Futurity Trophy is now the last Group 1 event of the British flat racing season. The 2019 race was run on Newcastle's Tapeta track, after the Doncaster meeting was abandoned because of waterlogging, thereby becoming the first British Group 1 race to be run on an artificial surface.

Six winners have subsequently achieved victory in the following year's Derby: Reference Point (1986); High Chaparral (2001); Motivator (2004); Authorized (2006); Camelot (2011); Auguste Rodin (2022).

== Records ==
Leading jockey (5 wins):

- Lester Piggott – Ribocco (1966), Noble Decree (1972), Apalachee (1973), Dunbeath (1982), Lanfranco (1984)
- Pat Eddery – Sporting Yankee (1976), Dactylographer (1977), Beldale Flutter (1980), Reference Point (1986), Armiger (1992)

Leading trainer (13 wins):

- Aidan O'Brien - Saratoga Springs (1997), Aristotle (1999), High Chaparral (2001), Brian Boru (2002), St Nicholas Abbey (2009), Camelot (2011), Kingsbarns (2012), Saxon Warrior (2017), Magna Grecia (2018), Luxembourg (2021), Auguste Rodin (2022), Hawk Mountain (2025), Giant Sequoia (2026)

Leading owner (11 wins): (includes part ownership)

- Sue Magnier – Aristotle (1999), High Chaparral (2001), Brian Boru (2002), St Nicholas Abbey (2009), Camelot (2011), Kingsbarns (2012), Saxon Warrior (2017), Magna Grecia (2018), Luxembourg (2021), Auguste Rodin (2022),Hawk Mountain (2025)

== Winners ==
Year	Winner	Jockey	Trainer	Owner	Time
1961	Miralgo	Bill Williamson	Harry Wragg	Gerry Oldham	1:44.40
1962	Noblesse	Garnie Bougoure	Paddy Prendergast	Evelyn Olin	1:39.00
1963	Pushful (Note: Scissors finished first in 1963, but he was relegated to second place following a stewards' inquiry)	Harry Carr	S Meaney	Lionel Holliday	1:39.00
1964	Hardicanute	Bill Williamson	Paddy Prendergast	Jim Mullion	1:40.40
1965	Pretendre	Ron Hutchinson	Jack Jarvis	Claude Lilley	1:42.60
1966	Ribocco	Lester Piggott	Fulke Johnson Houghton	Charles Engelhard	1:44.60
1967	Vaguely Noble	Bill Williamson	Walter Wharton	Brook Holliday	1:44.80
1968	The Elk	Bill Pyers	Jeremy Tree	Monica Sheriffe	1:44.60
1969	Approval	Duncan Keith	Henry Cecil	Sir Humphrey de Trafford	1:45.80
1970	Linden Tree	Duncan Keith	Peter Walwyn	Mrs D. McCalmont	1:46.00
1971	High Top	Willie Carson	Bernard van Cutsem	Sir Jules Thorn	1:40.80
1972	Noble Decree	Lester Piggott	Bernard van Cutsem	Nelson Bunker Hunt	1:42.79
1973	Apalachee	Lester Piggott	Vincent O'Brien	Jack Mulcahy	1:43.51
1974	Green Dancer	Freddy Head	Alec Head	Jacques Wertheimer	1:45.01
1975	Take Your Place	Gianfranco Dettori	Henry Cecil	Carlo d'Alessio	1:40.50
1976	Sporting Yankee	Pat Eddery	Peter Walwyn	William Hill Racing	1:48.56
1977	Dactylographer	Pat Eddery	Peter Walwyn	Philip Niarchos	1:43.70
1978	Sandy Creek	Christy Roche	Con Collins	Alfie McLean	1:38.32
1979	Hello Gorgeous	Joe Mercer	Henry Cecil	Daniel Wildenstein	1:42.30
1980	Beldale Flutter	Pat Eddery	Michael Jarvis	Tony Kelly	1:43.53
1981	Count Pahlen	Geoff Baxter	Bruce Hobbs	Mrs Tony Villar	1:42.40
1982	Dunbeath	Lester Piggott	Henry Cecil	Michael Riordan	1:44.05
1983	Alphabatim	Greville Starkey	Guy Harwood	Khalid Abdullah	1:41.30
1984	Lanfranco	Lester Piggott	Henry Cecil	Charles St George	1:43.90
1985	Bakharoff	Greville Starkey	Guy Harwood	Khalid Abdullah	1:41.20
1986	Reference Point	Pat Eddery	Henry Cecil	Louis Freedman	1:45.03
1987	Emmson	Willie Carson	Dick Hern	Sir Michael Sobell	1:42.66
1988	Al Hareb	Willie Carson	Neil Graham	Hamdan Al Maktoum	1:40.73
1989 (Note: The 1989 running took place at Newcastle)	Be My Chief	Steve Cauthen	Henry Cecil	Peter Burrell	1:42.99
1990	Peter Davies	Steve Cauthen	Henry Cecil	Charles St George	1:46.00
1991	Seattle Rhyme	Cash Asmussen	David Elsworth	H. J. Senn	1:39.58
1992	Armiger	Pat Eddery	Henry Cecil	Khalid Abdullah	1:39.70
1993	King's Theatre	Willie Ryan	Henry Cecil	Poland / Sheikh Moh'd	1:41.04
1994	Celtic Swing	Kevin Darley	Lady Herries	Peter Savill	1:40.04
1995	Beauchamp King	John Reid	John Dunlop	Erik Penser	1:38.89
1996	Medaaly	Gary Hind	Saeed bin Suroor	Godolphin	1:41.12
1997	Saratoga Springs	Michael Kinane	Aidan O'Brien	Michael Tabor	1:40.36
1998	Commander Collins	Jimmy Fortune	Peter Chapple-Hyam	Robert Sangster	1:47.80
1999	Aristotle	George Duffield	Aidan O'Brien	Sue Magnier	1:45.00
2000	Dilshaan	Johnny Murtagh	Sir Michael Stoute	Saeed Suhail	1:45.87
2001	High Chaparral	Kevin Darley	Aidan O'Brien	Tabor / Magnier	1:45.39
2002	Brian Boru	Kevin Darley	Aidan O'Brien	Sue Magnier	1:46.01
2003	American Post	Christophe Soumillon	Criquette Head-Maarek	Khalid Abdullah	1:39.57
2004	Motivator	Kieren Fallon	Michael Bell	Royal Ascot Racing Club	1:41.62
2005	Palace Episode	Neil Callan	Kevin Ryan	Theresa Marnane	1:45.10
2006 (Note: The 2006 edition was held at Newbury)	Authorized	Frankie Dettori	Peter Chapple-Hyam	Al Homaizi / Al Sagar	1:43.74
2007	Ibn Khaldun	Kerrin McEvoy	Saeed bin Suroor	Godolphin	1:37.62
2008	Crowded House	Jamie Spencer	Brian Meehan	Reddam / Burrell / Harvey	1:39.17
2009	St Nicholas Abbey	Johnny Murtagh	Aidan O'Brien	Smith / Magnier / Tabor	1:39.62
2010	Casamento	Frankie Dettori	Michael Halford	Sheikh Mohammed	1:37.03
2011	Camelot	Joseph O'Brien	Aidan O'Brien	Smith / Magnier / Tabor	1:38.58
2012	Kingsbarns	Joseph O'Brien	Aidan O'Brien	Magnier / Tabor / Smith	1:40.32
2013	Kingston Hill	Andrea Atzeni	Roger Varian	Paul D Smith	1:44.83
2014	Elm Park	Andrea Atzeni	Andrew Balding	Qatar Racing & Kingsclere Racing	1:43.82
2015	Marcel	Andrea Atzeni	Peter Chapple-Hyam	Paul Hancock	1:40.85
2016	Rivet	Andrea Atzeni	William Haggas	The Starship Partnership	1:37.08
2017	Saxon Warrior	Ryan Moore	Aidan O'Brien	Smith / Magnier / Tabor	1:40.12
2018	Magna Grecia	Donnacha O'Brien	Aidan O'Brien	Smith / Magnier / Tabor / Flaxman	1:37.72
2019 (Note: The 2019 running was held at Newcastle on an all-weather surface)	Kameko	Oisin Murphy	Andrew Balding	Qatar Racing Ltd	1:36.26
2020	Mac Swiney	Kevin Manning	Jim Bolger	Jackie Bolger	1:41.98
2021	Luxembourg	Ryan Moore	Aidan O'Brien	Smith / Magnier / Tabor / Westerberg	1:43.61
2022	Auguste Rodin	Ryan Moore	Aidan O'Brien	Tabor / Smith / Magnier / Westerberg	1:44:76
2023	Ancient Wisdom	William Buick	Charlie Appleby	Godolphin	1:46.45
2024	Hotazhell	Shane Foley	Jessica Harrington	Silverton Hill Partnership	1:41.95
2025	Hawk Mountain	Ronan Whelan	Aidan O'Brien	Smith / Magnier / Tabor	1:43.85
2026	Giant Sequoia	Dylan Browne McMonagle	Aidan O'Brien	Resolute Racing, Coolmore, Westerberg	1:42.30

== See also ==
- Horse racing in Great Britain
- List of British flat horse races
- Recurring sporting events established in 1961 – this race is included under its original title, Timeform Gold Cup.
