= Be My Chief =

American-bred Thoroughbred racehorse

- Sire: Chief's Crown
- Grandsire: Danzig
- Dam: Lady Be Mine
- Damsire: Sir Ivor
- Sex: Stallion
- Foaled: 7 May 1987
- Country: United States
- Colour: Bay
- Breeder: Peter Burrell
- Owner: Peter Burrell
- Trainer: Henry Cecil
- Record: 7: 6-0-0

Major wins
- Chesham Stakes (1989); Bernard Van Cutsem Stakes (1989); Lanson Champagne Vintage Stakes (1989); Solario Stakes (1989); Racing Post Trophy (1989)

Be My Chief (7 May 1987 – 2006) was an American-bred, British-trained Thoroughbred racehorse and sire. He was the leading British two-year-old in 1989 when he was undefeated in six races including the Chesham Stakes, Bernard Van Cutsem Stakes, Lanson Champagne Vintage Stakes, Solario Stakes and Racing Post Trophy, starting odds-on favourite on each occasion. He finished unplaced on his only run in 1990 and was retired to stud. He had some success as a sire of winners.

== Background ==
Be My Chief was a bay horse with a large white star four white socks bred in Kentucky by his owner Peter Burrell. He was from the first crop of foals sired by Chief's Crown who won the Breeders' Cup Juvenile and was voted American Champion Two-Year-Old Male Horse in 1984. He went on to sire several other major winners including Erhaab, Grand Lodge and Chief Bearheart. Be My Chief's dam Lady Be Mine won one minor race from four attempts as a three-year-old in England in 1981. She was a granddaughter of the broodmare My Game, whose other descendants have included Marwell, Marling, Paean and Unite.

Peter Burrell who ran the British National Stud brought the colt to race in Europe and sent him into training with Henry Cecil at the Warren Place stable in Newmarket, Suffolk.

== Racing career ==
=== 1989: two-year-old season ===
Be My Chief began his racing career in a six furlong maiden race at Doncaster Racecourse on 27 May in which he was ridden by Willie Ryan and started at odds of 4/9 against seven opponents. He recovered from being hampered at the start, took the lead a furlong out, and won by three lengths from Balla Cove, a colt who went on to win the Middle Park Stakes. When the colt reappeared on 22 June for the Listed Chesham Stakes at Royal Ascot he was ridden by Steve Cauthen, who partnered him in all his subsequent races. Starting at odds of 2/5 in an eight-runner field, he took the lead inside the final furlong and won by a length from the Richard Hannon, Sr-trained Osario. Be My Chief again started odds-on favourite when he was stepped up in distance for the Bernard Van Cutsem Stakes over seven furlongs at Newmarket Racecourse. He led from the start, drew clear in the final furlong, and won by three lengths from Long Iland, with Balla Cove two and a half lengths back in third.

On 27 July, Be My Chief was stepped up to Group Three level for the Lanson Champagne Vintage Stakes at Goodwood Racecourse. Starting at odds of 8/15, he led from the start, accelerated into a clear advantage two furlongs from the finish and held on to win by half a length and a length from Robellation and Dashing Blade. In his next two races, Dashing Blade won the National Stakes and the Dewhurst Stakes. Only two horses, Balla Cove and Robellation, appeared to oppose Be My Chief when the colt started 1/3 favourite for the Solario Stakes at Sandown Park Racecourse on 18 August. Be My Chief recorded his fifth consecutive victory, but had to be hard ridden by Cauthen to prevail by three quarters of a length from Robellation.

On his final race of the season, Be My Chief was stepped up to Group One level for the Racing Post Trophy over one mile at Newcastle Racecourse on 28 October. The event had been previously known as the William Hill Futurity and was being run for the first time under the sponsorship of the Racing Post. It had been transferred from its traditional venue at Doncaster Racecourse after the St Leger meeting in September had been abandoned owing to the poor state of the ground at the Yorkshire course. His four opponents were the Qathif, Cutting Note, Baligh and Loch Fruin, none of whom had previously contested a Group race. Starting the 4/7 favourite, he led from the start, accelerated in the final furlong and won by four lengths from Baligh.

=== 1990: three-year-old season ===
Be My Chief suffered from a series of training problems in the early part of 1990 and missed both the 2000 Guineas and The Derby. He eventually reappeared in the Scottish Classic over ten furlongs at Ayr Racecourse on 12 July and started the 2/1 favourite in a seven-runner field. He led until the last three furlongs but then quickly faded and finished tailed off in last place, more than twenty-five lengths behind the winner Husyan.

== Stud record ==
Be My Chief was retired from racing to become a breeding stallion. He was initially based at the National Stud before standing in Sweden and Poland. His two most successful runners, however, had their biggest wins in North America: Hail The Chief won the Hawthorne Gold Cup whilst the racemare Donna Viola won the Yellow Ribbon Stakes and the Gamely Stakes. His other good winners included Flying Squaw a filly who won the Moët & Chandon-Rennen. He died in 2006 at the age of nineteen.

== Pedigree ==
Pedigree of Be My Chief (USA), bay stallion, 1987
Sire Chief's Crown (USA) 1982	Danzig (USA); 1977	Northern Dancer	Nearctic
Sire Chief's Crown (USA) 1982	Danzig (USA); 1977	Northern Dancer	Natalma
Sire Chief's Crown (USA) 1982	Danzig (USA); 1977	Pas De Nom	Admiral's Voyage
Sire Chief's Crown (USA) 1982	Danzig (USA); 1977	Pas De Nom	Petitioner
Sire Chief's Crown (USA) 1982	Six Crowns (USA); 1976	Secretariat	Bold Ruler
Sire Chief's Crown (USA) 1982	Six Crowns (USA); 1976	Secretariat	Somethingroyal
Sire Chief's Crown (USA) 1982	Six Crowns (USA); 1976	Chris Evert	Swoon's Son
Sire Chief's Crown (USA) 1982	Six Crowns (USA); 1976	Chris Evert	Miss Carmie
Dam Lady Be Mine (USA) 1978	Sir Ivor (USA); 1965	Sir Gaylord	Turn-To
Dam Lady Be Mine (USA) 1978	Sir Ivor (USA); 1965	Sir Gaylord	Somethingroyal
Dam Lady Be Mine (USA) 1978	Sir Ivor (USA); 1965	Attica	Mr Trouble
Dam Lady Be Mine (USA) 1978	Sir Ivor (USA); 1965	Attica	Athenia
Dam Lady Be Mine (USA) 1978	My Advantage (GB); 1966	Princely Gift	Nasrullah
Dam Lady Be Mine (USA) 1978	My Advantage (GB); 1966	Princely Gift	Blue Gem
Dam Lady Be Mine (USA) 1978	My Advantage (GB); 1966	My Game	My Babu
Dam Lady Be Mine (USA) 1978	My Advantage (GB); 1966	My Game	Flirting (family 14-c)
