= Take Your Place =

American-bred Thoroughbred racehorse

- Sire: Round Table
- Grandsire: Princequillo
- Dam: Zonah
- Damsire: Nasrullah
- Sex: Stallion
- Foaled: 4 February 1973
- Country: United States
- Colour: Bay
- Breeder: John R. Gaines, Skara Glen Stable, & Dan Lasater
- Owner: Carlo d'Alessio
- Trainer: Henry Cecil
- Record: 6: 3-1-0

Major wins
- Observer Gold Cup (1975)

Awards
- Timeform rating 125 (1975), 112 (1976)

Take Your Place (4 February 1973 – 1995) was an American-bred, British-trained Thoroughbred racehorse. He was one of the best two-year-olds of his generation in Britain in 1975 when he was unbeaten in three races including the Group One Observer Gold Cup. He began the following year as a leading contender for The Derby but was beaten in all three of his starts. He later stood as a breeding stallion but had little success as a sire of winners.

== Background ==
Take Your Place was a tall, lightly made bay horse with a small white star bred in Kentucky by John R. Gaines, Skara Glen Stable, and Dan Lasater. His sire, Round Table was one of the most successful grass specialists in American racing history, winning forty-three races and being named American Horse of the Year in 1958. He became a highly successful breeding stallion, being the Leading sire in North America in 1972. Take Your Place's dam Zonah won two minor races in the United States before becoming a successful broodmare: her other offspring included the leading racemare Drumtop. Zonah was a granddaughter of the influential broodmare Rough Shod, whose descendants have included Ridan, Moccasin, Apalachee, Thatch, Nureyev and Sadler's Wells.

As a yearling Take Your Place was auctioned at Keeneland in July 1974 and was sold for $125,000. He passed into the ownership of Carlo d'Alessio and was sent to Europe where he was trained by Henry Cecil at Warren Place in Newmarket.

== Racing career ==
=== 1975: two-year-old season ===
Take Your Place began his racing career by winning a maiden race over seven furlongs at Newmarket Racecourse and then won a minor event over the same distance at Great Yarmouth. On 25 October he was moved up sharply in class for the Group One Observer Gold Cup, Britain's most valuable race for juveniles, over one mile at Doncaster Racecourse. Ridden by Gianfranco Dettori he started at odds of 4/1 in a field headed by the French challenger Earth Spirit (winner of the Critérium de Maisons-Laffitte). Take Your Place overtook his pacemaker St Joles a furlong and a half from the finish but was immediately challenged by Earth Spirit. The pair engaged in what Timeform described as "a tremendous duel" before Take Your Place gained the advantage in the final strides and won by a head. The other French contender Gallapiat took third ahead of Indus Warrior.

=== 1976: three-year-old season ===
In 1976, Take Your Place began his season in the Sandown Classic Trial over ten furlongs in April in which he started odds-on favourite but finished second to the Dick Hern-trained Riboboy. In the Dante Stakes (a major trial race for the Derby Stakes) at York Racecourse in May he was strongly fancied to enhance his claims for the Epsom classic but ran disappointingly to finish fourth behind Trasi's Son. He was then dropped in distance for the St James's Palace Stakes over one mile at Royal Ascot in June and finished fifth of the eight runners behind Radetzky.

Later that year he was sent to the United States to be trained by Roger Laurin but never raced again and was retired to stud.

== Assessment ==
There was no International Classification of European two-year-olds in 1975: the official handicappers of Britain, Ireland and France compiled separate rankings for horses which competed in those countries. In the British Free Handicap, Take Your Place was allotted a weight of 128 pounds, making him the second best juvenile colt, five pounds below the top-rated Wollow. The independent Timeform organisation rated him on 125, two pounds below Wollow and five behind the French-trained Manado. In 1976 he was rated 112 by Timeform.

== Stud record ==
Take Your Place stood as a breeding stallion in the United States for several years before being exported to South Africa, but hd little success in either country. His last reported foals were born in 1994. Take Your Place died in 1995.

== Pedigree ==
Pedigree of Take Your Place (USA), bay stallion, 1973
Sire Round Table (USA) 1954	Princequillo (IRE); 1940	Prince Rose	Rose Prince
Sire Round Table (USA) 1954	Princequillo (IRE); 1940	Prince Rose	Indolence
Sire Round Table (USA) 1954	Princequillo (IRE); 1940	Cosquilla	Papyrus
Sire Round Table (USA) 1954	Princequillo (IRE); 1940	Cosquilla	Quick Thought
Sire Round Table (USA) 1954	Knight's Daughter (GB); 1941	Sir Cosmo	The Boss
Sire Round Table (USA) 1954	Knight's Daughter (GB); 1941	Sir Cosmo	Hayn Ali
Sire Round Table (USA) 1954	Knight's Daughter (GB); 1941	Feola	Friar Marcus
Sire Round Table (USA) 1954	Knight's Daughter (GB); 1941	Feola	Aloe
Dam Zonah (USA) 1958	Nasrullah (GB); 1940	Nearco	Pharos
Dam Zonah (USA) 1958	Nasrullah (GB); 1940	Nearco	Nogara
Dam Zonah (USA) 1958	Nasrullah (GB); 1940	Mumtaz Begum	Blenheim
Dam Zonah (USA) 1958	Nasrullah (GB); 1940	Mumtaz Begum	Mumtaz Mahal
Dam Zonah (USA) 1958	Gambetta (USA); 1952	My Babu	Djebel
Dam Zonah (USA) 1958	Gambetta (USA); 1952	My Babu	Perfume
Dam Zonah (USA) 1958	Gambetta (USA); 1952	Rough Shod	Gold Bridge
Dam Zonah (USA) 1958	Gambetta (USA); 1952	Rough Shod	Dalmary (Family:5-h)
