= Medaaly =

British-bred Thoroughbred racehorse

- Sire: Highest Honor
- Grandsire: Kenmare
- Dam: Dance of Leaves
- Damsire: Sadler's Wells
- Sex: Stallion
- Foaled: 25 March 1994
- Country: United Kingdom
- Colour: Grey
- Breeder: Sheikh Mohammed
- Owner: Godolphin
- Trainer: Saeed bin Suroor
- Record: 7: 3-1-0
- Earnings: £106,904

Major wins
- Racing Post Trophy (1996)

Medaaly (25 March 1994 – 21 March 2011) was a British Thoroughbred racehorse and sire. As a two-year-old in 1996 he was one of the best staying colts of his generation in Britain, winning three of his five races including the Racing Post Trophy on his final appearance of the year. He sustained an injury in winning the Trophy and never recovered his form, finishing unplaced in his two subsequent starts. He later stood as a breeding stallion in France, South Africa and Ireland and had some success as a sire of National Hunt horses. He died in Ireland in 2011 at the age of 17.

== Background ==
Medaaly was a grey horse standing 1.65 metres high, bred in England by his owner Sheikh Mohammed. He was sired by Highest Honor, a French stallion whose most important victory came in the 1987 Prix d'Ispahan. He later became a very successful sire of winners, with the best of his progeny including California Memory, Sagacity (Critérium de Saint-Cloud), Reve d'Oscar (Prix Saint-Alary), Marotta (Prix Saint-Alary) and Dedication (Prix de la Forêt). Medaaly's dam Dance of Leaves was an unraced mare who produced several other winners including the Queen Anne Stakes winner Charnwood Forest. She was a daughter of the influential broodmare Fall Aspen, whose other descendants have included Timber Country, Dubai Millennium and Elnadim.

Medaaly raced in the colours of Sheikh Mohammed's Godolphin organisation and was trained throughout his racing career by Saeed bin Suroor.

== Racing career ==
=== 1996: two-year-old season ===
Medaaly began his racing career in a maiden race over seven furlongs at Sandown Park Racecourse on 6 July in which he was ridden by Mick Kinane. Starting at odds of 3/1 he took the lead in the last quarter mile but was overtaken in the closing stages and beaten three quarters of a length into second place by the filly Gretel. At the end of the month he was partnered by Darryll Holland when he started odds-on favourite for a similar event at Doncaster Racecourse. After tracking the leaders in the early stages he went to the front three furlongs from the finish and won by two and a half lengths from Further Outlook. John Reid took the ride when Medaaly was moved up in distance for a minor stakes over one mile at Sandown on 30 August. Starting the 4/9 favourite he raced in second before taking the lead two furlongs out and won "comfortably" by three and a half lengths from the Henry Cecil-trained Imperial President.

On 29 September Medaaly was moved up in class and started 3/1 second favourite for the Group Two Royal Lodge Stakes at Ascot Racecourse. Ridden by Frankie Dettori he was restrained in the early stages and never looked likely to win, finishing fifth behind Benny the Dip, Desert Story, Besiege and Equal Rights. Four weeks later he faced Benny the Dip and Besiege again in the Group One Racing Post Trophy at Doncaster and started a 14/1 outsider in a nine-runner field which also included his better-fancied stablemate Asas. With many of the leading jockeys engaged in the Breeders' Cup at Woodbine Racetrack in Canada he was partnered by Gary Hind, a relatively little-known jockey who had ridden for the Godolphin stable in Dubai. Hind settled the colt behind the leaders as the outsider Daylight in Dubai set the pace from Besiege. Medaaly moved up to challenge the leaders approaching the final furlong, took the lead in the closing stages and won by half a length from Poteen with Benny the Dip a length and a quarter away in third place. The win gave Gary Hind his first and only Group One success in Europe. After the race he commented "I was a bit worried early, because Medaaly wasn't really travelling. But in the straight he came back on the bridle and used his experience to battle back past the other horse. When he was beaten last time the wrong tactics were used, and the team was quietly confident".

After the race Medaaly was found to have sustained a serious leg injury described as a "chip in his knee".

=== 1997 & 1998: three- and four-year-old seasons ===
After spending the winter recuperating in Dubai, Medaaly returned to England in the spring of 1997 and made his seasonal debut in the Dante Stakes (a major trial for The Derby) over ten and a half furlongs at York Racecourse on 14 May. Ridden by Dettori he chased the leaders in the early stages but faded quickly in the straight and finished eighth of the nine runners behind Benny the Dip. The colt then had further training problems and missed the rest of the season.

Medaaly remained in training as a four-year-old but made only one appearance when he contested the first round of the Maktoum Challenge at Nad Al Sheba Racecourse on 22 January 1998. Racing on dirt for the first time he finished fifth behind Wathik, beaten more than twelve lengths.

== Stud record ==
After his retirement from racing Medaaly stood as a breeding stallion at the Haras du Logis in Normandy. He was exported to South Africa in 2004 and moved back to Europe in 2008 to stand in Ireland. The best of his flat performers included Daly Daly (Grand Prix de Vichy) and the Listed race winners Tocopila and Rento. His offspring did better under National Hunt rules and included Medermit (Scilly Isles Novices' Chase, Haldon Gold Cup), Sky's the Limit (Coral Cup) and Shekira (Prix Renaud du Vivier). In March 2011 he suffered a cardiac arrest after covering a mare at the Badger Hill Stud in County Galway and died at the age of 17.

== Pedigree ==
Pedigree of Medaaly (GB), grey stallion, 1994
| Sire Highest Honor (FR) 1983 | Kenmare (FR); 1975 | Kalamoun | Zeddaan |
| Sire Highest Honor (FR) 1983 | Kenmare (FR); 1975 | Kalamoun | Khairunissa |
| Sire Highest Honor (FR) 1983 | Kenmare (FR); 1975 | Belle of Ireland | Milesian |
| Sire Highest Honor (FR) 1983 | Kenmare (FR); 1975 | Belle of Ireland | Belle of the Ball |
| Sire Highest Honor (FR) 1983 | High River (FR); 1978 | Riverman | Never Bend |
| Sire Highest Honor (FR) 1983 | High River (FR); 1978 | Riverman | River Lady |
| Sire Highest Honor (FR) 1983 | High River (FR); 1978 | Hairbrush | Sir Gaylord |
| Sire Highest Honor (FR) 1983 | High River (FR); 1978 | Hairbrush | Bug Brush |
| Dam Dance of Leaves (GB) 1987 | Sadler's Wells (USA); 1981 | Northern Dancer | Nearctic |
| Dam Dance of Leaves (GB) 1987 | Sadler's Wells (USA); 1981 | Northern Dancer | Natalma |
| Dam Dance of Leaves (GB) 1987 | Sadler's Wells (USA); 1981 | Fairy Bridge | Bold Reason |
| Dam Dance of Leaves (GB) 1987 | Sadler's Wells (USA); 1981 | Fairy Bridge | Special |
| Dam Dance of Leaves (GB) 1987 | Fall Aspen (USA); 1976 | Pretense | Endeavour |
| Dam Dance of Leaves (GB) 1987 | Fall Aspen (USA); 1976 | Pretense | Imitation |
| Dam Dance of Leaves (GB) 1987 | Fall Aspen (USA); 1976 | Change Water | Swaps |
| Dam Dance of Leaves (GB) 1987 | Fall Aspen (USA); 1976 | Change Water | Portage (Family: 4-m) |
