= Lanfranco (horse) =

British-bred Thoroughbred racehorse

- Sire: Relko
- Grandsire: Tanerko
- Dam: Cama
- Damsire: Pardao
- Sex: Stallion
- Foaled: 2 April 1982
- Country: United Kingdom
- Colour: Chestnut
- Breeder: Mrs M P Pitt
- Owner: Charles St George
- Trainer: Henry Cecil
- Record: 10: 5-1-2

Major wins
- William Hill Futurity (1984); Predominate Stakes (1985); King Edward VII Stakes (1985)

Awards
- Timeform rating 123 (1984), 123 (1985)

Lanfranco (2 April 1982 – after 1992) was a British Thoroughbred racehorse and sire. As a two-year-old in 1984 he showed great promise by winning three of his four races including the William Hill Futurity. In the following year he was overshadowed by his stable companions Slip Anchor and Oh So Sharp but recorded further victories in the Predominate Stakes and the King Edward VII Stakes. He contested all three legs of the British Triple Crown, finishing seventh in the 2000 Guineas, fifth in The Derby and third in the St Leger. He was retired from racing after sustaining the last of a series of injuries after winning five of his ten races. He stood as a breeding stallion in New Zealand but had little success.

== Background ==
Lanfranco was a chestnut horse with a broad white blaze and a long white sock on his left hind leg. He was sired by Relko, the French-trained winner of the 1963 Epsom Derby. Relko was not a conspicuous success as a sire of winners, although several of his daughters made an impact as broodmares. Lanfranco's dam Cama was an undistinguished racehorse, winning one minor race as a two-year-old in 1972. She was a distant female-line descendant of the outstanding racemare Wheel of Fortune.

As a yearling, Lanfranco was consigned to the Newmarket Highflyer Sale and bought for 17,500 guineas. He entered the ownership of Charles St George and was sent into training with Henry Cecil at the Warren Place stable in Newmarket, Suffolk.

== Racing career ==
=== 1984: two-year-old season ===
On his racecourse debut, Lanfranco contested a maiden race at Newmarket Racecourse in June and finished second of the twelve runners, beaten half a length by the Guy Harwood-trained St Hilarion. In another maiden at Yarmouth Racecourse in July he recorded his first success, winning very easily from six opponents at odds of 1/4. In the Exeter Stakes at Newmarket in August he faced only two opponents and led for most of the way to defeat Kohaylan by two and a half lengths. The runner-up subsequently franked the form by winning the Acomb Stakes at York later that month Lanfranco sustained a minor injury in the Exeter Stakes (Cecil described him as having been "jarred up" on the firm ground) and he missed the Royal Lodge Stakes which had been his intended target.

After a break of over two months, Lanfranco was moved up in class for the Group One William Hill Futurity over one mile at Doncaster Racecourse. Ridden by Lester Piggott he was made the 100/30 third favourite behind the French-trained River Drummer (runner-up in the Grand Critérium) and the Harwood-trained Sabona, whilst the other eight runners included Damister and Highfire (first and second in the Somerville Tattersall Stakes) as well Brave Bambino (third in the Seaton Delaval Stakes) and Northern River, who had beaten Sabona at Newbury. Piggott settled the colt in second place behind the outsider Great Reef before sending him to the front approaching the last quarter mile. Lanfranco accelerated into a two length lead and then stayed on in the closing stages to win by three quarters of a length and one and a half lengths from Damister and Brave Bambino with River Drummer in fourth place.

=== 1985: three-year-old season ===
On his first appearance as a three-year-old, Lanfranco started 10/1 third favourite for the 2000 Guineas at Newmarket on 4 May but looked completely outpaced and finished seventh of the fourteen runners behind Shadeed. Later that month he was moved up to one and a half miles for the Predominate Stakes at Goodwood Racecourse. He started favourite and won easily by three lengths from Phardante. In the 206th running of the Epsom Derby on 5 June Lanfranco started at odds of 14/1 in a fourteen-runner field: Henry Cecil had doubts about running the colt as he felt that the prevailing firm ground would be to his disadvantage. With Steve Cauthen riding the Cecil stable's main hope Slip Anchor, and Piggott opting to ride the Irish-trained Theatrical Lanfranco was ridden by the American jockey Cash Asmussen. On a course which, according to Cecil, did not suit the colt, he finished fifth behind Slip Anchor, Law Society, Damister and Supreme Leader. Timeform opined that should have been aimed instead at the Prix du Jockey Club in which Mouktar was "the only top-class horse" engaged.

Two weeks after his run at Epsom, Lanfranco started the 13/8 favourite for the King Edward VII Stakes at Royal Ascot. Ridden by Cauthen, he recorded an easy win, beating Mango Express by four lengths, with another four lengths back to Infantry in third place. After his connections opted to bypass the Irish Derby, Lanfranco was matched against older horses for the first and only time in the Princess of Wales's Stakes at Newmarket on 9 July. He started the 4/6 favourite but finished third behind Petoski and Crazy with Jupiter Island in fourth. The winner went on to take the King George VI & Queen Elizabeth Stakes eighteen days later. As in his previous season, the experience of racing on firm ground resulted in injury, with Lanfranco suffering a "jarred shoulder" which kept him off the course for two months.

On his final appearance Lanfranco contested the St Leger Stakes over fourteen and a half furlongs at Doncaster on 14 September. He started the 85/40 second favourite behind his stable companion Oh So Sharp, a filly who was bidding for a Triple Crown after winning the 1000 Guineas and the Oaks Stakes. Ridden by Piggott he led for most way without being able to break away from his five opponents, before being overtaken by Oh So Sharp three furlongs from the finish. He stayed on well in the last quarter mile without ever looking to regain his advantage and finished third, beaten three quarters of a length and a head by Oh So Sharp and Phardante.

== Assessment ==
In the official International Classification of European two-year-olds for 1984, Lanfranco was rated on 75, nine pounds behind the top-rated Kala Dancer, and four behind River Drummer whom he had defeated decisively at Doncaster. The independent Timeform organisation gave him a rating of 123, six pounds inferior to Kala Dancer, who was rated their best two-year-old. In 1985 he was again rated 123 by Timeform, thirteen pounds behind their top-rated three-year-old Slip Anchor. In the International Classification he was rated fifteen pounds inferior to Slip Anchor, who was the highest-rated three-year-old of the year.

== Stud record ==
At the end of his racing career Lanfranco was exported to stand as a breeding stallion in New Zealand before returning to Europe. He had little impact as a sire of the winners with the best of his offspring being the steeplechaser Leading Bounty. His last foals were born in 1993.

== Pedigree ==
Pedigree of Lanfranco, chestnut stallion, 1982
Sire Relko (GB) 1960	Tanerko (FR); 1953	Tantieme	Deux Pour Cent
Sire Relko (GB) 1960	Tanerko (FR); 1953	Tantieme	Terka
Sire Relko (GB) 1960	Tanerko (FR); 1953	La Divine	Fair Copy
Sire Relko (GB) 1960	Tanerko (FR); 1953	La Divine	La Diva
Sire Relko (GB) 1960	Relance (FR); 1952	Relic	War Relic
Sire Relko (GB) 1960	Relance (FR); 1952	Relic	Bridal Colors
Sire Relko (GB) 1960	Relance (FR); 1952	Polaire	Le Volcan
Sire Relko (GB) 1960	Relance (FR); 1952	Polaire	Stella Polaris
Dam Cama (FR) 1970	Pardao (GB); 1958	Pardal	Pharis
Dam Cama (FR) 1970	Pardao (GB); 1958	Pardal	Adargatis
Dam Cama (FR) 1970	Pardao (GB); 1958	Three Weeks	Big Game
Dam Cama (FR) 1970	Pardao (GB); 1958	Three Weeks	Eleanor Cross
Dam Cama (FR) 1970	Golden Corn (GB); 1955	Hyperion	Gainsborough
Dam Cama (FR) 1970	Golden Corn (GB); 1955	Hyperion	Selene
Dam Cama (FR) 1970	Golden Corn (GB); 1955	Millet	Mieuxce
Dam Cama (FR) 1970	Golden Corn (GB); 1955	Millet	Kannabis (Family 1-w)
