= Dactylographer (horse) =

American-bred Thoroughbred racehorse

- Sire: Secretariat
- Grandsire: Bold Ruler
- Dam: Artist's Proof
- Damsire: Ribot
- Sex: Stallion
- Foaled: 21 April 1975
- Country: United States
- Colour: Bay
- Breeder: Stavros Niarchos
- Owner: Philip Niarchos; Stavros Niarchos
- Trainer: Peter Walwyn
- Record: 7: 3-1-1

Major wins
- William Hill Futurity (1977)

Awards
- Timeform rating 119 (1977), 115 (1978)

Dactylographer (21 April 1975 – 31 October 1996) was an American-bred, British-trained Thoroughbred racehorse. From the first crop of the foals sired by Secretariat, he showed great promise as a two-year-old when he won two of his three races including the Group One William Hill Futurity. In the following year he finished third in the Derby Trial Stakes but finished unplaced in his three subsequent races. He later stood as a breeding stallion in Florida with limited success.

== Background ==
Dactylographer was a bay horse with a white star and white markings on his hind feet, bred in Kentucky by the Greek shipping magnate Stavros Niarchos. He was from the first crop of foals sired by the 1973 Triple Crown winner Secretariat. His dam, Artists Proof was a high class racemare who won the Pocahontas Stakes and finished third in the Kentucky Oaks. She was descended from the broodmare Lalun who won the Kentucky Oaks and produced both Never Bend and Bold Reason. Artists Proof was in foal (pregnant) to Secretariat when she was offered at the Keeneland Fall Breeding Stock Sale in November 1974 and was bought for $385,000 by Niarchos: Dactylographer was born the following April. The colt was sent to race in Europe and was trained throughout his racing career by Peter Walwyn at Lambourn.

== Racing career ==
=== 1977: two-year-old season ===
Dactylographer never contested a maiden race and began his racing career in the Philips Electrical Stakes over seven furlongs at Ascot Racecourse in late September. He started slowly but finished well to take second place behind the Jeremy Tree-trained Home Run, with the future Irish St. Leger winner M-Lolshan in third. Fifteen days later he started favourite in a thirteen-runner field for the Sandwich Stakes over the same course and distance. After taking the lead a furlong and a half from the finish he drew away in the closing stages to win by four lengths from Valour, a colt who went on to win the Grosser Preis von Baden. His win was the first for Secretariat in Europe.

At the end of October, Dactylographer was moved up in class for the Group One William Hill Futurity over one mile at Doncaster Racecourse. Ridden by Pat Eddery, he started 100/30 second favourite behind Home Run in a twelve-runner field which also included Ile de Bourbon, Hawaiian Sound, Julio Mariner, Orange Marmelade (runner-up in the Prix Saint-Roman) and Whitstead (later to win the Great Voltigeur Stakes). Dactylographer took the lead three furlongs out, got the better of a sustained struggle with Home Run and held off the late challenge of Julio Mariner to win by a neck.

=== 1978: three-year-old season ===
Dactylographer began his second season in the Derby Trial Stakes over one and a half miles on heavy ground at Lingfield Park in May and finished third behind Whitstead and Son Fils. At Royal Ascot in June he contested the King Edward VII Stakes and finished fifth behind Ile de Bourbon. He recorded his only success of the season in a minor race at Lingfield in August, winning by four lengths from the five-year-old Dutch Treat. On his final appearance he was moved up to one and three quarter miles for the March Stakes at Goodwood Racecourse and finished fourth of the five runners behind Le Moss.

== Assessment ==
There was no International Classification of European two-year-olds in 1977: the official handicappers of Britain, Ireland, and France compiled separate rankings for horses which competed in those countries. In the British Free Handicap, Sporting Yankee was given top-weight of 120 pounds, thirteen pounds behind the top-rated Try My Best. The independent Timeform organisation gave him a rating of 119, making him eleven pounds inferior Try My Best. In their annual Racehorses of 1977 Timeform described him as a "tall, rather lightly made" juvenile who was likely make a good stayer. Timeform gave him a rating of 115 in 1978.

== Stud record ==
After his retirement from racing, Dactylographer returned to the United States to become a breeding stallion and was based at Comfort Acre Farm in Florida. He later moved to the nearby Flying "M" Acres, where his handler described him as being "crazier than a bedbug". The most successful of his offspring was Ronbra whose 19 wins included the Grade III Pennsylvania Governors Cup. Dactylographer died at South Star Ranch in Texas on 31 October 1996 at the age of twenty-one.

== Pedigree ==
Pedigree of Dactylographer (USA), bay stallion, 1975
Sire Secretariat (USA) 1970	Bold Ruler (USA); 1954	Nasrullah	Nearco
Sire Secretariat (USA) 1970	Bold Ruler (USA); 1954	Nasrullah	Mumtaz Begum
Sire Secretariat (USA) 1970	Bold Ruler (USA); 1954	Miss Disco	Discovery
Sire Secretariat (USA) 1970	Bold Ruler (USA); 1954	Miss Disco	Outdone
Sire Secretariat (USA) 1970	Somethingroyal (USA); 1952	Princequillo	Prince Rose
Sire Secretariat (USA) 1970	Somethingroyal (USA); 1952	Princequillo	Cosquilla
Sire Secretariat (USA) 1970	Somethingroyal (USA); 1952	Imperatrice	Caruso
Sire Secretariat (USA) 1970	Somethingroyal (USA); 1952	Imperatrice	Cinquepace
Dam Artists Proof (USA) 1967	Ribot (GB); 1952	Tenerani	Bellini
Dam Artists Proof (USA) 1967	Ribot (GB); 1952	Tenerani	Tofanella
Dam Artists Proof (USA) 1967	Ribot (GB); 1952	Romanella	El Greco
Dam Artists Proof (USA) 1967	Ribot (GB); 1952	Romanella	Barbara Burrini
Dam Artists Proof (USA) 1967	Be Ambitious (USA); 1958	Ambiorix	Tourbillon
Dam Artists Proof (USA) 1967	Be Ambitious (USA); 1958	Ambiorix	Lavendula
Dam Artists Proof (USA) 1967	Be Ambitious (USA); 1958	Be Faithful	Bimelech
Dam Artists Proof (USA) 1967	Be Ambitious (USA); 1958	Be Faithful	Bloodroot (Family: 19-b)
