= Celtic Swing =

British-bred and trained Thoroughbred racehorse

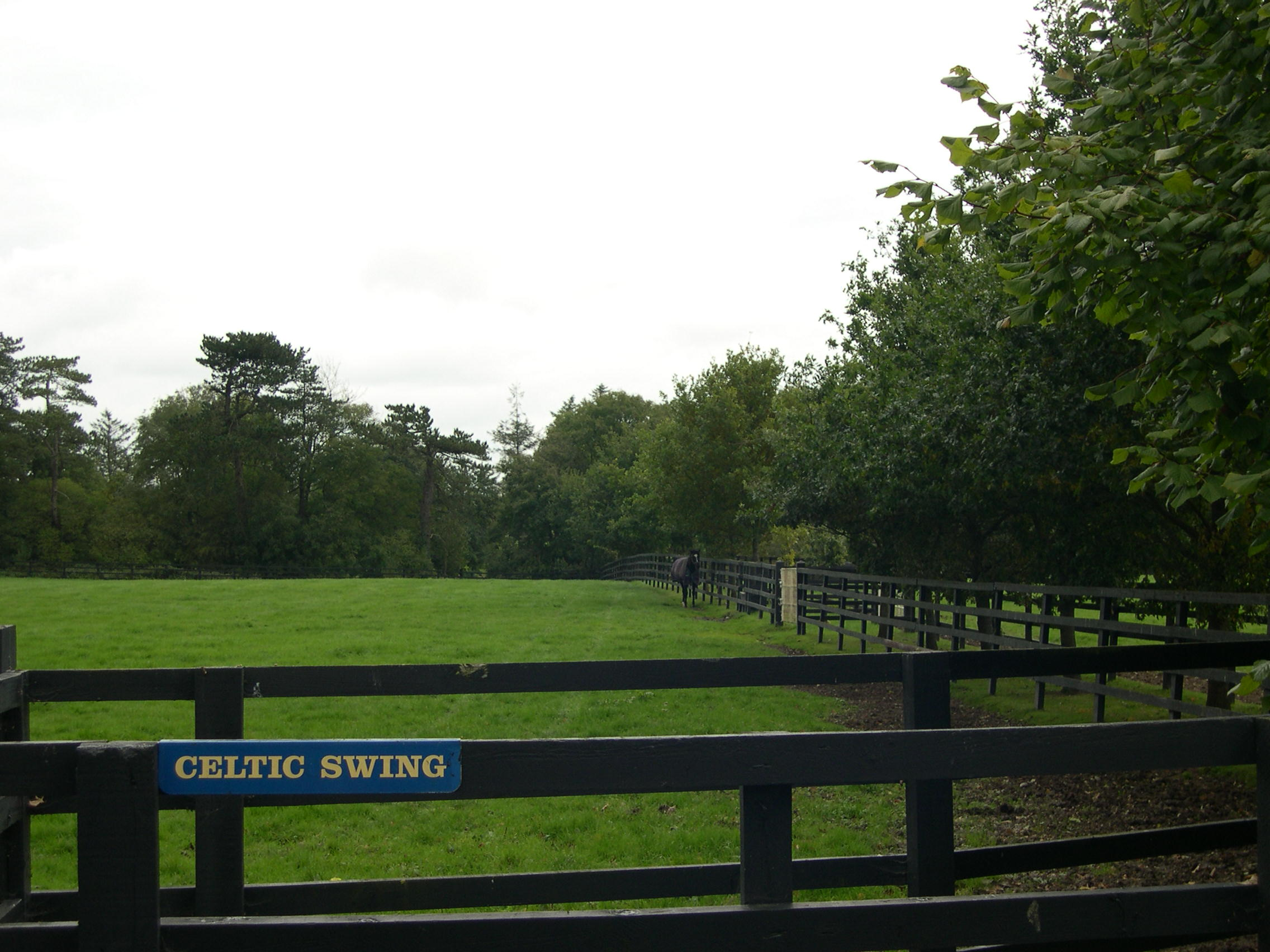
- Celtic Swing in retirement at the Irish National Stud in 2004
- Sire: Damister
- Grandsire: Mr. Prospector
- Dam: Celtic Ring
- Damsire: Welsh Pageant
- Sex: Stallion
- Foaled: 21 February 1992
- Died: 4 September 2010 (aged 18)
- Country: British
- Colour: Dark Bay/Brown
- Breeder: Lavinia, Duchess of Norfolk
- Owner: Peter Savill
- Trainer: Lady Herries
- Record: 7: 5 - 1 - 0
- Earnings: £470,938

Major wins
- Racing Post Trophy (1994); Greenham Stakes (1995); Prix du Jockey Club (1995)

Awards
- European Champion Two-Year-Old Colt (1994)

Honours
- Timeform rating: 138
- Last updated on 26 June 2022

Celtic Swing (21 February 1992 – 4 September 2010) was a British Thoroughbred racehorse. He won the French Derby in 1995 and was also known for his performances in the autumn of the previous year, when his wins at Ascot and at Doncaster led to the horse being the highest-rated two-year-old in modern European racing.

== Background ==
Celtic Swing was owned for most of his career by Peter Savill, bred by Lavinia, Duchess of Norfolk and trained by her daughter Lady Herries in Sussex.

He was sired by Damister, an American-bred horse who finished third in the 1985 Epsom Derby, out of the British mare Celtic Ring. His granddam, Pencuik Jewel, was a half sister to 1974 Ascot Gold Cup winner Ragstone, and to Castle Moon - the dam of 1986 St Leger winner Moon Madness, 1989 Coronation Cup winner Sheriff's Star and 1990 Goodwood Cup winner Lucky Moon. His name, although partially inspired by that of his dam, was specifically taken from a Van Morrison track. In all his seven races he was ridden by Kevin Darley.

== Racing career ==
=== 1994: two-year-old season ===
Celtic Swing raced for the first time at Ayr on 16 July 1994, winning a two-year-old maiden race over seven furlongs by four lengths. This would be the only time he ran without starting as favourite. On 8 October 1994 he won over seven furlongs at Ascot by eight lengths, beating the subsequently hugely successful Singspiel. Although this created considerable excitement, the race that led to the hype was the Racing Post Trophy over a mile at Doncaster on 22 October 1994, which he won by twelve lengths. He was voted the Cartier Racing Award as the top European two-year-old colt.

Going into 1995, expectations ran high for Celtic Swing with widespread claims that he would be one of the greatest horses of all time, and almost unprecedentedly short odds for the 2,000 Guineas and Derby. Claims were even made that, 25 years after Nijinsky had been the last horse to do it, he would also take the St Leger and win the colts' Triple Crown, which it was widely believed had become almost impossible due to specialist breeding.

=== 1995: three-year-old season ===
Almost inevitably, he never lived up to these grand expectations, which included a number of rapturous editorials in The Times. Stepping back to seven furlongs, he made his seasonal debut on softened ground at Newbury in the Greenham Stakes on 22 April 1995. Although his win over Bahri was not spectacular, he was still unchallenged, and he would have won by much more than the eventual one and a quarter lengths had he not been eased down.

All was set for the 2,000 Guineas on 6 May 1995, a race run amid almost unbearable expectations (on that day's Morning Line, John McCririck said to Jim McGrath, who was strongly involved with Timeform which had said that the race was a "certainty", that if the horse did not win by at least eight lengths McGrath was finished). But the first cracks in Celtic Swing's armour suddenly emerged: although he fought back near the end, he could not beat the French horse Pennekamp, who eventually won by a head. Owner Peter Savill decided not to run in The Derby, claiming that the ground at Epsom was too firm for the horse's liking, and go instead for the Prix du Jockey Club (the "French Derby") at Chantilly on 4 June 1995. Here he started evens favourite, and won, but only by an unconvincing half-length over Poliglote.

His final race would be in the Irish Derby at The Curragh on 2 July 1995. Here he started as 5-4 favourite, but finished a bitterly disappointing eighth out of thirteen runners, never having looked like winning. Worse was to follow: he had been injured during the race, and the rest of his schedule for the season was abandoned. It had been intended to run him again as a four-year-old in the later part of the 1996 season, but the injury recurred and, almost unnoticed, the much-hyped "wonderhorse" was quietly retired on 20 July 1996, more than a year after his last race.

== Stud record ==
Celtic Swing's stud record was largely unremarkable but he did sire two outstanding horses. The Australian bred Takeover Target (Dam – Shady Stream) won eight Group One races including top sprinting races in Australia, United Kingdom, Japan and Singapore and A$6,028,311 in prize money from twenty one wins in forty one race starts. The French-bred filly Six Perfections won six races including the Breeders' Cup Mile in 2003. Celtic Swing died at the Allevamento di Besnate in Italy in September 2010 after contracting colitis.
