= Commander Collins =

Irish-bred Thoroughbred racehorse

- Sire: Sadler's Wells
- Grandsire: Northern Dancer
- Dam: Kanmary
- Damsire: Kenmare
- Sex: Stallion
- Foaled: 8 April 1996
- Country: Ireland
- Colour: Bay
- Breeder: Swettenham Stud
- Owner: Robert Sangster, Sue Magnier and Tony Collins
- Trainer: Peter Chapple-Hyam; John Gosden
- Record: 10: 2-1-2
- Earnings: £151,099

Major wins
- Superlative Stakes (1998); Racing Post Trophy (1998)

Commander Collins (8 April 1996 – after 2004) was an Irish Thoroughbred racehorse and sire. He showed great promise as a two-year-old in 1998, winning the Superlative Stakes on his racecourse debut, taking second in the Champagne Stakes and then recording a seven length victory in the Racing Post Trophy. He never won again although he was placed in the Princess of Wales's Stakes and the Prix Foy as a four-year-old. He made no impact as a breeding stallion in a brief stud career spent in Japan and Ireland.

== Background ==
Commander Collins was a bay horse with a narrow white blaze bred in Ireland by Robert Sangster's Swettenham Stud. He was from the eleventh crop of foals sired by Sadler's Wells, who won the Irish 2,000 Guineas, Eclipse Stakes and Irish Champion Stakes in 1984 went on to be the Champion sire on fourteen occasions. Commander Collins' dam Kanmary was a high class racemare who won the Prix du Bois and was placed in several other major races. She was even more successful as broodmare, producing Colonel Collins (third in the 1994 Epsom Derby), City Leader (Royal Lodge Stakes) and Lit de Justice. Kanmary was descended from the French broodmare Theodora who was the female-line ancestor of Soviet Star and The Very One.

During his racing career, Commander Collins was owned by Sangster in partnership with Tony Collins, after whom the colt was named. Collins was a former trainer best known for his involvement in the Gay Future affair and had acquired the nickname "The Colonel" ironically after he failed an officer's exam during National Service. Sangster had previously named Colonel Collins in his friend's honour. After the colt's second race, a share in his ownership was bought by John Magnier. Commander Collins was sent into training with Peter Chapple-Hyam at Sangster's training establishment at Manton in Wiltshire.

== Racing career ==
=== 1998: two-year-old season ===
Commander Collins never contested a maiden race, beginning his racing career in the Listed Superlative Stakes over seven furlongs at Newmarket Racecourse on 9 July in which he was ridden by John Reid. Despite his lack of prior experience he started 4/5 favourite against five opponents headed by the Chesham Stakes winner Rhapsodist. After recovering from a poor start, he took the lead inside the final furlong and won by one and a quarter lengths from Rhapsodist with Dehoush in third ahead of Royal Rebel. The colt was highly regarded by his trainer and attracted support in the betting for the following year's 2000 Guineas but was then kept of the course for several weeks with a respiratory infection. Jimmy Fortune took over the ride when the colt returned to contest the Group Two Champagne Stakes at Doncaster Racecourse on 11 September, and partnered him in most of his subsequent races. Starting at odds of 7/2, he tracked the leaders before staying on in the straight but failed by a head to overhaul the Barry Hills-trained Auction House.

Commander Collins returned to Doncaster on 24 October and was made the 2/1 favourite for the Group One Racing Post Trophy over one mile on heavy ground. His five rivals were Tumbleweed Ridge (third in the Champagne Stakes), the maiden winners Timahs, Magno and Housemaster and the 20/1 outsider Stormy Skye. The favourite was restrained by Fortune at the rear of the field as Magno set the pace but began to make progress approaching the last quarter mile. He took the lead a furlong out and quickly went clear of his opponents to win easily by seven lengths from Magno. After the race he was made favourite for the 1999 Epsom Derby. Chapple-Hyam commented "It was a long, long way up the straight and I was worried about running him when I saw the state of the course. He is still green, still learning, and can only get better".

=== 1999: three-year-old season ===
On his three-year-old debut Commander Collins started 8/1 fourth favourite for the 2000 Guineas run that year on the July Course at Newmarket on 1 May. After tracking the leaders in the early stage he faded badly in the last quarter mile and finished eleventh of the sixteen runners behind Island Sands. Jimmy Fortune reported that the colt had been unsuited by the fast ground. He was off the course for over three months before returning in the Group two Prix Guillaume d'Ornano at Deauville Racecourse on 14 August. Ridden by Gerald Mosse he never looked likely to win and finished fourth of five behind Val Royal.

Later in August Robert Sangster dismissed Chapple-Hyam as the trainer at Manton and appointed John Gosden to replace him.

=== 2000: four-year-old season ===
In four starts in Europe in 2000, Commander Collins ran consistently without winning. He finished fourth to Little Rock in the Gordon Richards Stakes in April and then returned after a lengthy absence to run third behind the same horse in the Princess of Wales's Stakes at Newmarket in July. In September he was sent to France where he finished third to Montjeu in the Prix Foy before returning to England to run fourth in the Cumberland Lodge Stakes. On his final racecourse appearance Commander Collins was sent to the United States for the Turf Classic Invitational at Belmont Park on 7 October. Starting a 35/1 outsider he was in contention in the early stages but faded in the closing stages and finished eleventh behind the nine-year-old gelding John's Call.

== Stud record ==
At the end of his racing career, Commander Collins was exported to become a breeding stallion in Japan where he sired only three winners in two seasons at stud. He returned to Ireland in and sired a few minor winners, mainly under National Hunt rules, with the last of his foals being born in 2005.

== Pedigree ==
Pedigree of Commander Collins (IRE), bay stallion, 1996
Sire Sadler's Wells (USA) 1981	Northern Dancer (CAN); 1961	Nearctic	Nearco
Sire Sadler's Wells (USA) 1981	Northern Dancer (CAN); 1961	Nearctic	Lady Angela
Sire Sadler's Wells (USA) 1981	Northern Dancer (CAN); 1961	Natalma	Native Dancer
Sire Sadler's Wells (USA) 1981	Northern Dancer (CAN); 1961	Natalma	Almahmoud
Sire Sadler's Wells (USA) 1981	Fairy Bridge (USA); 1975	Bold Reason	Hail To Reason
Sire Sadler's Wells (USA) 1981	Fairy Bridge (USA); 1975	Bold Reason	Lalun
Sire Sadler's Wells (USA) 1981	Fairy Bridge (USA); 1975	Special	Forli
Sire Sadler's Wells (USA) 1981	Fairy Bridge (USA); 1975	Special	Thong
Dam Kanmary (FR) 1983	Kenmare (FR); 1975	Kalamoun	Zeddaan
Dam Kanmary (FR) 1983	Kenmare (FR); 1975	Kalamoun	Khairunissa
Dam Kanmary (FR) 1983	Kenmare (FR); 1975	Belle of Ireland	Milesian
Dam Kanmary (FR) 1983	Kenmare (FR); 1975	Belle of Ireland	Belle of the Ball
Dam Kanmary (FR) 1983	Djallybrook (FR); 1975	Djakao	Tanerko
Dam Kanmary (FR) 1983	Djallybrook (FR); 1975	Djakao	Diagonale
Dam Kanmary (FR) 1983	Djallybrook (FR); 1975	Hollybrook	Klairon
Dam Kanmary (FR) 1983	Djallybrook (FR); 1975	Hollybrook	La Vagabonde (Family: 9-f)
