= Godolphin (racing) =

Thoroughbred racing stable

Racing colours of Godolphin

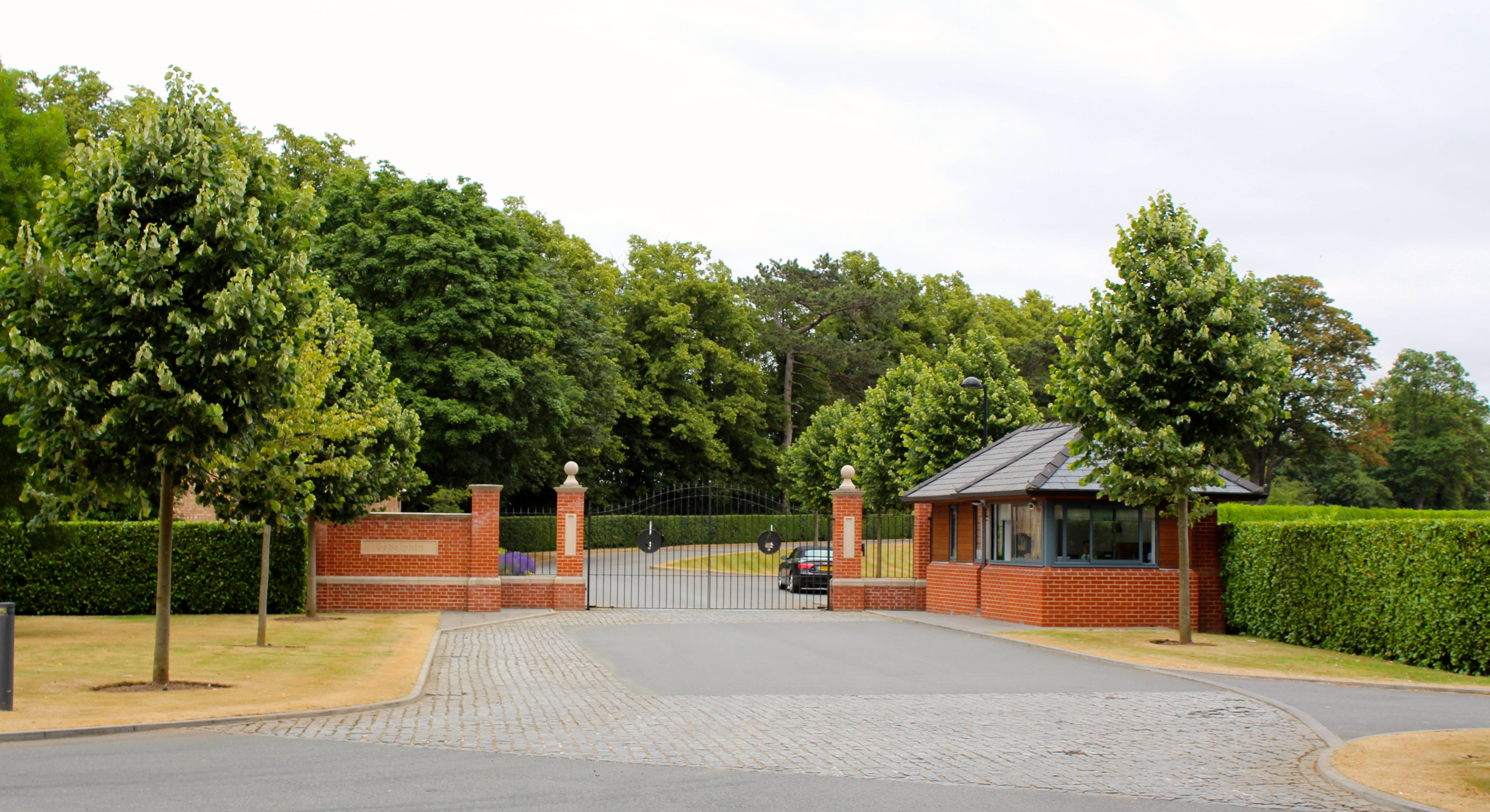
Godolphin Stables in Newmarket, UK

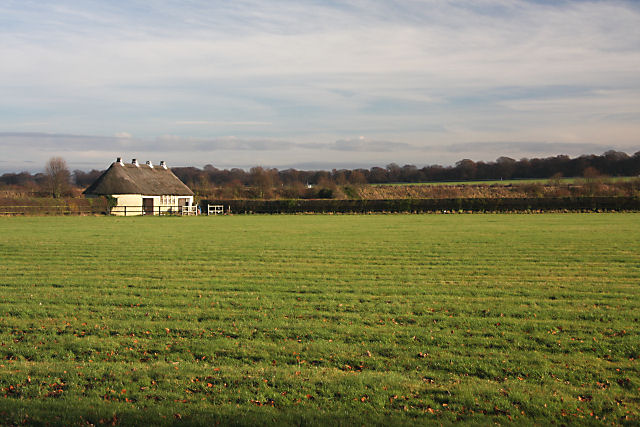
Thatched barn at Godolphin Stables

Godolphin (Arabic: جودولفين) is the private Thoroughbred horseracing stable of the House of Maktoum, the ruling house of Dubai. It is named in honour of the Godolphin Arabian, a 17th-century horse who came from the desert to become one of the three founding stallions of the modern Thoroughbred. Godolphin is buried at Wandlebury Park in Cambridge, where there is a stone to commemorate the horse in the passageway of the old buildings.

Godolphin's headquarters are in Dubai, United Arab Emirates. It operates two racing stables in Newmarket, UK, two in Sydney, Australia, one in Melbourne, Australia, and also has horses in training with independent trainers in Great Britain, Australia, France, Japan, the United States, and Ireland. UAE Vice President, Prime Minister and Ruler of Dubai, Sheikh Mohammed bin Rashid Al Maktoum is the driving force behind Godolphin.

The family's breeding operation, Darley, is named in honour of another of the three original Thoroughbred stallions, Darley Arabian. Darley breeds horses in Australia, France, Ireland, Japan, the United Kingdom, and the United States. Dubai Millennium, who won the Dubai World Cup at Nad Al Sheba, UAE and the Prince of Wales's Stakes at Royal Ascot, UK in 2000, stood at Dalham Hall.

Godolphin has won over 5,000 races worldwide and numerous awards since its inception in 1992, marking their 5,000th win in August 2018. Its most successful years numerically are 2015 (650 wins), 2017 (607 wins), 2016 (597 wins), and 2014 (361 wins).

Godolphin was the leading owner at the Dubai World Cup Carnival for eleven successive years from 2008 to 2018, and crowned British Champion Owner on twelve occasions - 1996, 1998, 1999, 2001, 2004, 2006, 2007, 2012, 2013, 2015, 2016, and 2017. Saeed bin Suroor trained his 200th Dubai World Cup Carnival winner when the aptly-named Very Special won the G2 Cape Verdi on 26 January 2017.

Godolphin won an Eclipse Award for the top North American owner at the 39th annual Eclipse Awards ceremony in 2010. It was the first time that Godolphin won the award for the top North American owner. The stable has had winners in 14 countries (Australia, Canada, France, Germany, Hong Kong, Ireland, Italy, Japan, Qatar, Singapore, Turkey, the UAE, the UK, and the USA). Godolphin would go on to again win the award for top owner at the Eclipse Awards in 2012 and in six consecutive years from 2020 to 2025.

== Activities ==
Godolphin's first runner and winner was Cutwater (GB) at Nad Al Sheba, Dubai on 24 December 1992 while Godolphin's international operation commenced in 1994.

Godolphin's operations are based in Al Quoz, Dubai, UAE and in Newmarket, United Kingdom, at Godolphin Stables (former Stanley House Stables, built in 1903 by Frederick Stanley, 16th Earl of Derby) and the historic Moulton Paddocks. Godolphin also has three stables in Australia, two in Sydney and one in Melbourne. Godolphin also operates the Darley Japan in Hidaka, Hokkaido, which manages a breeding farm and the Castle Park training facility for horses being trained in Japan.

To date, Godolphin has won a total of 288 Group One races around the globe. Godolphin registered its 100th Group One win with Sulamani in the 2003 Arlington Million. Hunter's Light, trained by Saeed bin Suroor and ridden by Silvestre de Sousa, recorded Godolphin's 200th Group One success with an impressive victory in the Al Maktoum Challenge R3, sponsored by the airline Emirates, at Meydan, Dubai, on Saturday, 9 March 2013.

Godolphin has won the Group One Dubai World Cup on ten occasions, thanks to Almutawakel (1999), Dubai Millennium (2000), Street Cry (2002), Moon Ballad (2003), Electrocutionist (2006), Monterosso (2012), African Story (2014), Prince Bishop (2015) and Thunder Snow (2018 and 2019).

Numerous major North American wins include six at the Breeders’ Cup meeting, highlighted by the victories of Daylami (1999) and Fantastic Light (2001) in the Breeders’ Cup Turf and Outstrip (2013) in the Breeders' Cup Juvenile Turf; Wuheida in the Breeders' Cup Filly and Mare Turf (2017); Talismanic in the Breeders' Cup Turf (2017); and Cody's Wish in the 2022 and 2023 Breeders' Cup Dirt Mile.

In keeping with its international outlook, Godolphin has gained four wins at the Cathay Pacific Hong Kong International Races and Heart Lake scored an early Japanese Group One win in the 1995 Yasuda Kinen.

In 2013, stable jockey Frankie Dettori departed the organisation. In the same year, the British Horseracing Authority disclosed that Godolphin employee Mahmood Al Zarooni (who had joined Godolphin as a trainer a few years earlier) had been charged with doping after 15 Godolphin horses he was training had tested positive for anabolic steroids. Sheikh Mohammed declared he was "appalled and angered" and would 'lock down' the stables with 'immediate effect'. Al Zarooni was quickly dismissed, and all 15 horses were later cleared to race. Previously, in 2009, Sheikh Mohammed's son, Hamdan bin Mohammed Al Maktoum, was banned from competition for 10 months after one of his horses was competing while on a steroid.

Godolphin commissioned an independent inquiry into Al Zarooni's activities, and subsequently a major reorganisation took place within Godolphin's UK operations On account of the scale of Godolphin's operations, and as doping activity is generally extremely rare in flat horse racing (robust anti-doping procedures mean detection is highly probable), the incident was described by The Economist as "the biggest doping scandal in racing history".

In late 2014, it was announced that Godolphin is to have a permanent presence in Australia. William Buick and James Doyle were appointed stable jockeys in early 2015, joining Mickael Barzalona, who joined the team in March 2012, and is Godolphin's retained rider in France.

In September 2016, Saeed bin Suroor reached a landmark 2,000 winners worldwide when Sky Hunter won the Listed Foundation Stakes at Goodwood.

From Saturday, 17 March 2018, all horses currently racing in the JRA in the name of His Highness Sheikh Mohammed bin Rashid Al Maktoum, will race in the name of Godolphin. The racing silks carried in Japan will change to royal blue with a lighter blue band on the sleeve.

In October 2023, James Doyle announced that he would be leaving Godolphin to become the retained jockey at Wathnan Racing.

Godolphin won the Thoroughbred Owners and Breeders Association awards for National Breeder of the Year and National Owner of the Year in 2023.

In May 2025, Godolphin won the Kentucky Oaks with the undefeated filly Good Cheer, and then won the Kentucky Derby the following day with Sovereignty. The Kentucky Derby victory was the first for Godolphin after twelve unsuccessful tries in the past. Godolphin became the first owner to win the Kentucky Oaks and Kentucky Derby in the same year since Sol Kumin's Head of Plains Partners in 2018, and the first sole ownership to do so since Calumet Farm won both races in 1952. On the same day that Sovereignty won the Kentucky Derby, Godolphin's three year old Ruling Court won the Group 1 2000 Guineas Stakes at Newmarket Racecourse in England. The day after the Kentucky Derby and 2000 Guineas, Godolphin-owned Desert Flower won the 1000 Guineas Stakes.

== Personnel ==
- Godolphin has two principal retained trainers; Saeed bin Suroor (UK & UAE), and Charlie Appleby (UK & UAE), along with numerous horses in training with external independent trainers in Australia, Japan, France, Ireland, the United Kingdom and the United States of America.
- Godolphin has William Buick and Billy Loughnane as their retained jockeys.

== Horses ==
Some of Godolphin's top horses include:

- Adayar
- African Story
- Alizee
- Aljabr
- Almutawakel
- Anamoe
- Astern
- Bachir
- Balanchine
- Barney Roy
- Belardo
- Benbatl
- Bivouac
- Blue Bunting
- Blue Point
- Broadsiding
- Campanologist
- Cape Cross
- Cape Verdi
- Cascadian
- Castle Lady
- Cavalryman
- Certify
- Cezanne
- Classic Cliche
- Cloth of Stars
- Cody's Wish
- Colette
- Coroebus
- Creachadoir
- Creative Force
- Cross Counter
- Dawn Approach
- Daylami
- Diktat
- Discreet Cat
- Dubai Millennium
- Dubawi
- Electrocutionist
- Encke
- Essential Quality
- Exosphere
- Fantastic Light
- Farhh
- Flit
- Fly to the Stars
- Frosted
- Ghaiyyath
- Grandera
- Halling
- Harry Angel
- Hartnell
- Hawkbill
- Hurricane Lane
- Ibn Khaldun
- In Secret
- Island Sands
- It's Tricky
- Jack Hobbs
- Kayf Tara
- Kazzia
- Kiamichi
- Lammtarra
- Lemon Pop
- Lyre
- Lyric of Light
- Mamool
- Marienbard
- Mark of Esteem
- Masar
- Mastery
- Maxfield
- Medaaly
- Mezzo Soprano
- Modern Games
- Moon Ballad
- Moonshell
- Music Note
- Mutafaweq
- Nations Pride
- Native Trail
- Naval Crown
- Nedawi
- Night of Thunder
- Old Persian
- Ombudsman
- Outstrip
- Papineau
- Paulele
- Persian King
- Pinatubo
- Poet's Voice
- Prince Bishop
- Punctilious
- Questing
- Quorto
- Ramonti
- Rebel's Romance
- Refuse To Bend
- Rewilding
- Ribchester
- Royal Marine
- Rule of Law
- Sakhee
- Savatiano
- Shamardal
- Sovereignty
- Space Blues
- Street Cry
- Sulamani
- Swain
- Talismanic
- Thunder Snow
- Trekking
- Victor Ludorum
- White Moonstone
- Wild Illusion
- Wuheida
- Yibir
- Zahrat Dubai
