= Pat Eddery =

Irish champion jockey (1952–2015)

Pat Eddery OBE
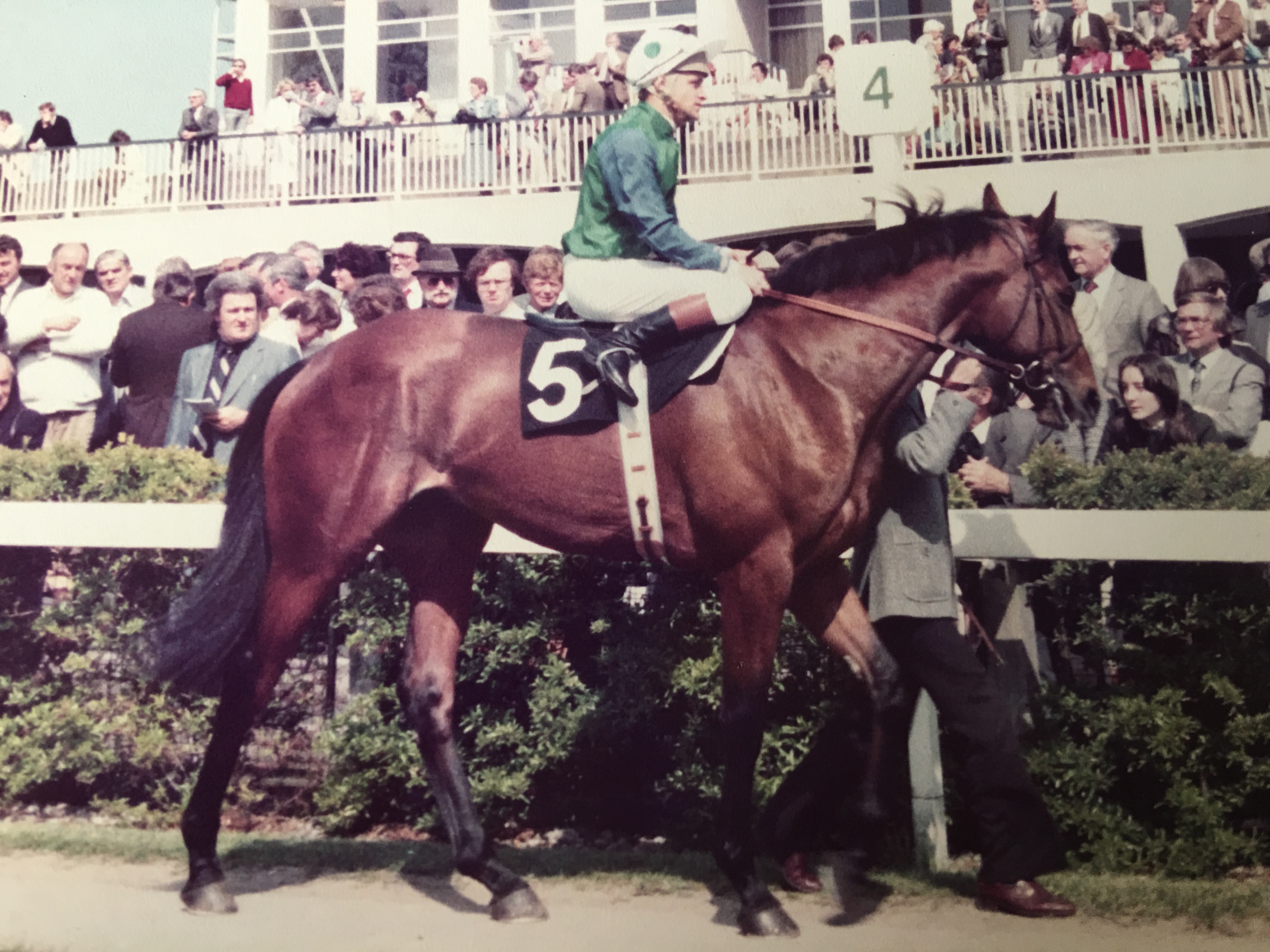
- Eddery on 1982 Epsom Derby winner Golden Fleece at Leopardstown

Personal information
- Born: 18 March 1952 Newbridge, County Kildare, Ireland
- Died: 10 November 2015 (aged 63) Aylesbury, Buckinghamshire, England
- Occupation: Jockey

Horse racing career
- Sport: Horse racing

Major racing wins
- British Classic Race wins as jockey: 2000 Guineas (3); 1000 Guineas (1); Epsom Derby (3); Epsom Oaks (3); St Leger Stakes (4)

Racing awards
- British flat racing Champion Jockey 11 times (1974, 1975, 1976, 1977, 1986, 1988, 1989, 1990, 1991, 1993, 1996)

Honours
- Honorary OBE; Pat Eddery Stakes at Ascot Racecourse; British Champions Series Hall of Fame (2021)

Significant horses
- Polygamy, Grundy, Scintillate, Detroit, Storm Bird, Kings Lake, Golden Fleece, Assert, Lomond, El Gran Senor, Rainbow Quest, Dancing Brave, Moon Madness, Warning, Zafonic, Quest for Fame, Toulon, Moonax, Bosra Sham, Lady Carla, Silver Patriarch

Patrick James John Eddery OBE (18 March 1952 – 10 November 2015) was an Irish flat racing jockey and trainer. He rode three winners of the Derby and was Champion Jockey on eleven occasions. He rode the winners of 4,632 British flat races, a figure exceeded only by Sir Gordon Richards.

== Background ==
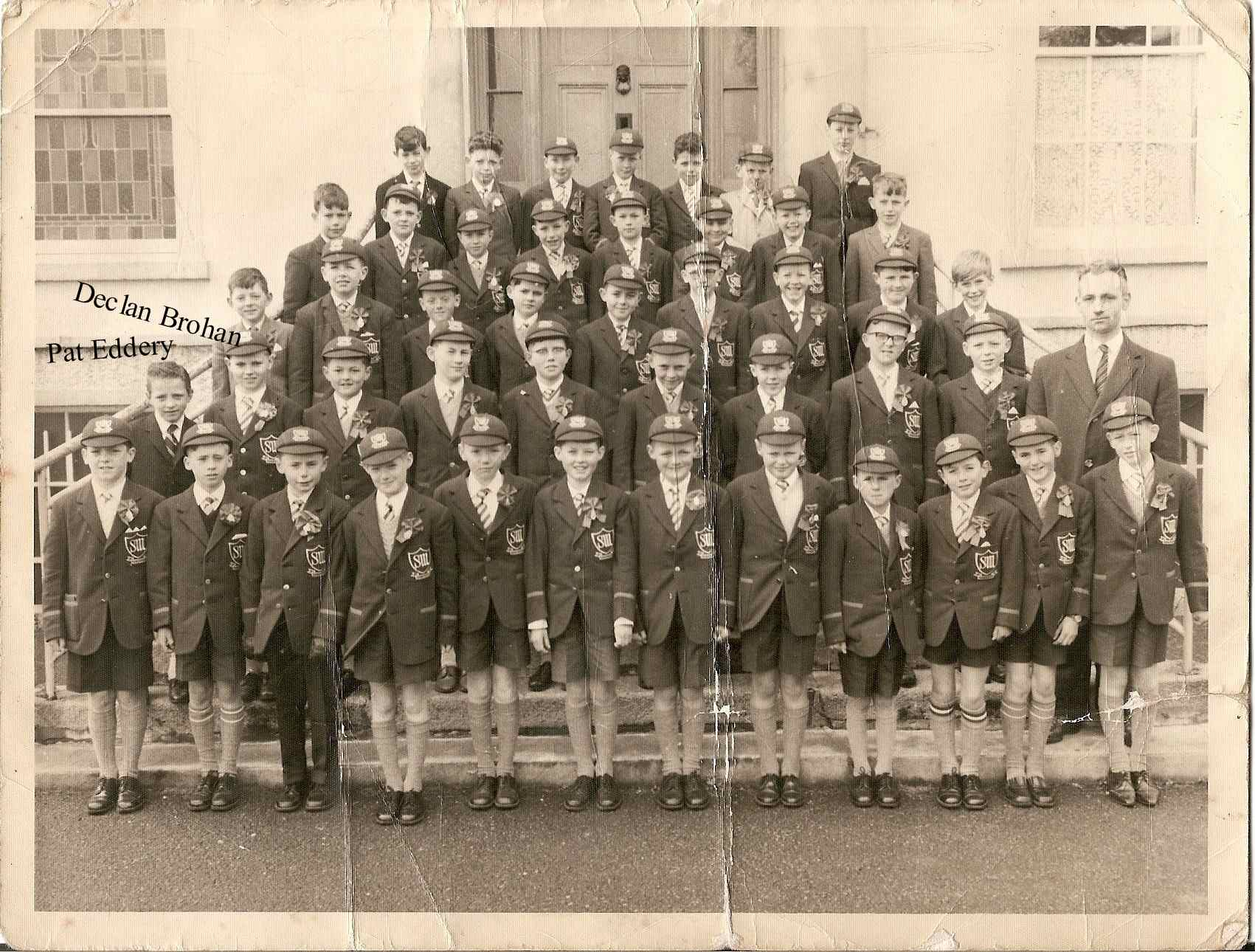
Eddery's class at Oatlands Primary School in Stillorgan

Eddery was born in Newbridge, County Kildare, near the Curragh Racecourse. (Note: Some sources give his birthplace as Dublin.) His mother, Josephine Eddery, was the daughter of jockey Jack Moylan; his father, Jimmy Eddery, was twice Irish champion jockey and won the 1955 Irish Derby on Panaslipper. Josephine and Jimmy had thirteen children - six daughters and seven sons, the eldest of whom died in infancy. Eddery was the fifth of the twelve surviving children. Several of his brothers became jockeys. Eddery attended the Patrician Brothers' Primary School in Newbridge and, when the family later moved to Blackrock, the Oatlands Primary School in Stillorgan. He learnt to ride as a very small child and was riding racehorses by the time he was nine. Taking little interest in school, he dreamed of winning the Derby.

== Riding career ==
Eddery began his career as an apprentice jockey in Ireland with the stable of Seamus McGrath. His first ride was at the Curragh in August 1967 where he finished last of the seven runners. Later that year he moved to England where he was apprenticed to Frenchie Nicholson and recorded his first success on Alvaro, trained by at Epsom Downs Racecourse on 24 April 1969 after riding more than one whole season without a single winner. The same horse was to give Eddery six wins in succession during the 1969 season. While still riding as an apprentice he won the Wokingham Handicap and the Timeform Gold Cup in 1969, the Northumberland Plate in 1970 and the Goodwood Stakes in 1971, a year in which he won the title of Champion Apprentice Jockey with 71 wins. In 1972, riding as retained jockey for Newmarket trainer Geoffrey Barling, Eddery had his first ride in the Epsom Derby and came third on outsider Pentland Firth. He was awarded the 1972 Ascot Gold Cup after the disqualification of first-past-the-post Rock Roi. Later that season, he became first jockey to the Lambourn yard of trainer Peter Walwyn.

The association between Eddery and Walwyn lasted eight years. In 1973, Eddery achieved 119 wins, and was leading jockey at Royal Ascot with five winners, including three for Walwyn. In 1974, he secured his first win in a British Classic, riding Polygamy for Walwyn in the Epsom Oaks, and was British Champion Jockey. Aged 22, he was the youngest British flat racing champion since World War II. He went on to win three more consecutive titles while riding for Walwyn. In 1975, he had his first Derby win, riding Grundy (horse) for Walwyn. That season, Grundy also provided Eddery with victories in the Irish 2,000 Guineas, the Irish Derby and the King George VI and Queen Elizabeth Stakes. His win against Bustino, ridden by Joe Mercer, in the latter race has been described as "the race of the century". Eddery spent the winters during the 1970s riding in Hong Kong for trainer John Brown.

Walwyn's yard was affected by the equine virus for two seasons from 1978, and Eddery's seasonal tally of winners dropped. In 1980, he accepted the offer of a lucrative retainer from Irish trainer Vincent O'Brien at Ballydoyle. For five years, Eddery would fly to Ireland for racing on Saturday, then return to his home in Oxford,race in France on Sunday, and in England from Monday to Friday. In Ireland he rode for trainer John Oxx, as well as O'Brien. In 1981, he won the Irish 2,000 Guineas on Kings Lake for O'Brien in a controversial race where the winner was demoted by the stewards and then restored to first place after a successful appeal by the trainer.. The following year, he was Irish champion flat racing jockey for the only time and won the Derby on Golden Fleece for O'Brien and owner Robert Sangster. Further Classic success followed for the team with Lomond in the 1983 2,000 Guineas, El Gran Senor in the 1984 2,000 Guineas and the 1984 Irish Derby, and Leading Counsel in the 1985 Irish St. Leger, while another of O'Brien's owners, Stavros Niarchos provided Eddery with a win in the 1985 Irish Derby on Law Society. El Gran Senor was beaten a short head by Secreto in the 1984 Derby, which Eddery described as the greatest disappointment of his racing career..

Eddery had won his first Prix de l'Arc de Triomphe in 1980 on Detroit, trained by Oliver Douieb and owned by Robert Sangster. In 1985, he rode Rainbow Quest, trained by Jeremy Tree, in the Juddmonte colours of Khalid Abdullah. Narrowly beaten by the previous year's winner, Sagace, they were awarded the race after a stewards enquiry. Early in the 1986 season, Abdullah approached Eddery with the offer of a retainer. Eddery accepted the offer, tempted by the money and the quality of Abdullah's horses, at a time when O'Brien's winners were in decline. It meant that, without the weekly visits to Ireland, he would be able to spend more time in England with his family and attempt to win the British champion jockey title again. He took over from Greville Starkey as the rider of Abdullah's Dancing Brave, trained by Guy Harwood. He partnered Dancing Brave to victory in the King George VI and Queen Elizabeth Stakes and the Prix de l'Arc de Triomphe. Other major winners in the Juddmonte colours included Zafonic, Quest for Fame and Toulon.

Eddery also rode a number of major winners outside Europe including Pebbles in the 1985 Breeders' Cup Turf and Jupiter Island in the 1986 Japan Cup. joined forces with Lester Piggott, Joe Mercer and French champion Freddie Head and Yves Saint-Martin in a group of riders to take part in a series of chenge races under the 'Ritz Club Challenge Trophy' at Singapore and other Asian cities starting in 1983 for several years. For several years, from 1983, he was part of a team which included Lester Piggott, Joe Mercer, Greville Starkey, Willie Carson, and French jockeys Freddie Head and Yves Saint-Martin. The team made trips to South Africa, Singapore, Hong Kong, Cyprus and the US to take part in a series of challenge races. Between 1986 and 1996, he secured a further seven British Champion jockey titles (1986, 1988, 1989, 1990, 1991, 1993, 1996). In 1987, he lost the title to Steve Cauthen by just two wins; the jockeys would have finished level on 196 winners had it not been for an objection by the rider of the third horse in the deciding race. The following year, he regained the title with 183 winners from just over 480 rides - a strike rate of over 38 per cent. In 1990, he rode 209 winners. It was his highest total and the first time a jockey had ridden more than 200 winners in a season since Gordon Richards in 1952. That year, he received the inaugural Lester Award for Flat Jockey of the Year, which he again won in 1991 and 1996, sharing it on the latter occasion with Frankie Dettori. He also received two Flat Jockey Special Recognition awards in 2002 and 2003.

Following the end of his association with Abdullah in 1994, Eddery rode as a freelance until his retirement in 2003. In 1997, he rode his 4,000th winner when Silver Patriarch, trained by John Dunlop won the St Leger. A back injury then side-lined him for six months. After Royal Ascot 2003, Eddery announced his decision to retire at the end of the season. He had ridden a total of 73 winners at the meeting and had five times been leading jockey. His last day of race riding was at Doncaster on 8 November 2003. He rode no winners that day, but was presented with a trophy for lifetime achievement. Over the course of his career, he had ridden 4,632 winners in Britain, second only to Gordon Richard, and won fourteen British Classic races. Internationally, he had ridden over 6,000 winners. From 1974 to 1999, Eddery's booking agent was his brother-in-law Terry Ellis, who also acted as his driver.

Eddery's riding style was not elegant by normal standards, owing to his habit of bouncing up and down in the saddle as he urged his mounts on at the finish, but was undeniably effective. Frenchie Nicholson said that he regretted the fact that his protegee abandoned the "quiet, refined" style he had been taught but admitted that the young jockey stood out as being "in total harmony" with the horses he rode.

Eddery summed up his attitude to the sport by saying, "That's all part of the game, going to the Folkestones and the smaller tracks, because it's not Royal Ascot every day. You've got to be out there every day working those muscles, riding in every race if you want to be at your best. There may be more money for a Derby than a seller but that doesn't make you try any harder. A winner is a winner."

== Training career ==
Following his retirement from riding, Eddery set up a racing syndicate organisation with his wife. In March 2005, he was awarded an honorary OBE, which he described as "a great honour".

In July 2005, Eddery was granted a training licence and set up a stable of 40 horses at Musk Hill Stud in Nether Winchendon, near Aylesbury. His first training success was with Visionist in a handicap race at Kempton Park in April 2006. His younger brother Paul Eddery, a jockey who had ridden over 1,500 winners, became his assistant trainer in 2009. As a trainer, Eddery sent out 117 winners, including Hearts Of Fire in Italy's Group 1 Gran Criterium in 2009.

== Death and legacy ==
In his later years, Eddery became increasingly dependent on alcohol. He died of a heart attack on 10 November 2015, aged 63. He left his £1.3 million estate to his partner, Emma Owen, who took over the training license at Musk Hill.

Lester Piggott paid tribute to his former racecourse rival: "The horses he was associated with speak for themselves, and I doubt you'd find a jockey with a sharper tactical brain or stronger in a finish. He was a huge personality in the weighing room, and wasn't slow to keep us all grounded with his wit and sense of humour."

The Pat Eddery Stakes, a listed race for two-year-olds, is held at Ascot every July.

Eddery was the subject of two books: Pat on the Back: The Story of Pat Eddery by Claude Duval (1976); To be a Champion an autobiography by Pat Eddery with Alan Lee (1992).

== Personal life ==
In November 1978, Eddery married Carolyn, the daughter of flat jockey Manny Mercer, niece of jockey Joe Mercer, and granddaughter of jockey Harry Wragg. They had two daughters, Nichola and Natasha, and a son Harry. Eddery also had a son from an extra-marital relationship, Toby Atkinson, who became a jockey. The marriage broke down in 2008 and the couple divorced in 2009. Eddery then formed a relationship with Emma Owen, who worked at his yard.

== Major wins as a jockey ==
1000 Guineas
1996
Bosra Sham	Matiya	Bint Shadayid

2000 Guineas
1983
Lomond	Tolomeo	Muscatite
1984
El Gran Senor	Chief Singer	Lear Fan
1993
Zafonic	Barathea	Bin Ajwaad

Derby
1975
Grundy	Nobiliary	Hunza Dancer
1982
Golden Fleece	Touching Wood	Silver Hawk
1990
Quest For Fame	Blue Stag	Elmaamul

Oaks
1974
Polygamy	Furioso	Matuta
1979
Scintillate	Bonnie Isle	Britannia's Rule
1996
Lady Carla	Pricket	Mezzogiorno

St Leger
1986
Moon Madness	Celestial Storm	Untold
1991
Toulon	Saddlers' Hall	Micheletti
1994
Moonax	Broadway Flyer	Double Trigger
1997
Silver Patriarch	Vertical Speed	The Fly

(United Kingdom) Great Britain

- 1,000 Guineas – (1) – Bosra Sham (1996)
- 2,000 Guineas – (3) – Lomond (1983), El Gran Senor (1984), Zafonic (1993)
- Ascot Gold Cup – (2) – Erimo Hawk (1972), Celeric (1997)
- Champion Stakes – (3) – Vitiges (1976), Pebbles (1985), Bosra Sham (1996)
- Cheveley Park Stakes – (5) – Pasty (1975), Woodstream (1981), Prophecy (1993), Gay Gallanta (1994), Wannabe Grand (1998)
- Coronation Cup – (6) – Crow (1978), Rainbow Quest (1985), Saint Estephe (1986), Saddler's Hall (1992), Sunshack (1995), Silver Patriarch (1998)
- Coronation Stakes – (2) – Orchestration (1977), Magic of Life (1988)
- Derby – (3) – Grundy (1975), Golden Fleece (1982), Quest for Fame (1990)
- Dewhurst Stakes – (6) – Lunchtime (1972), Grundy (1974), Storm Bird (1980), El Gran Senor (1983), Zafonic (1992), Grand Lodge (1993)
- Eclipse Stakes – (3) – Coup de Feu (1974), Solford (1983), Sadler's Wells (1984)
- Falmouth Stakes – (3) – Star Pastures (1981), Magic Gleam (1989), Ryafan (1997)
- Fillies' Mile – (2) – Tessla (1988), Bosra Sham (1995)
- Golden Jubilee Stakes – (1) – Great Commotion (then called The Cork and Orrery Stakes 1990)
- Haydock Sprint Cup – (3) – Record Token (1976), Dowsing (1988), Danehill (1989)
- International Stakes – (4) – Beldale Flutter (1981), Assert (1982), Caerleon (1983), One So Wonderful (1998)
- July Cup – (2) – Sharpo (1982), Lake Coniston (1995)
- King George VI and Queen Elizabeth Stakes – (2) – Grundy (1975), Dancing Brave (1986)
- King's Stand Stakes – (1) – African Song (1980)
- Middle Park Stakes – (5) – Habat (1973), Formidable (1977), Bassenthwaite (1984), Primo Valentino (1999), Balmont (2003)
- Nassau Stakes – (3) – Dancing Rocks (1982), Free Guest (1985), Ela Romara (1988)
- Nunthorpe Stakes – (4) – Sharpo (1980, 1981), Cadeaux Genereux (1989), Sheikh Albadou (1991)
- Oaks – (3) – Polygamy (1974), Scintillate (1979), Lady Carla (1996)
- Prince of Wales's Stakes – (5) – Record Run (1975), English Spring (1986), Two Timing (1989), Batshoof (1990), Placerville (1993)
- Queen Anne Stakes – (3) – Valiyar (1983), Pennine Walk (1986), Warning (1989)
- Queen Elizabeth II Stakes – (3) – Milligram (1987), Warning (1988), Bigstone (1993)
- Racing Post Trophy – (5) – Sporting Yankee (1976), Dactylographer (1977), Beldale Flutter (1980), Reference Point (1986), Armiger (1992)
- St. James's Palace Stakes – (3) – Radetzky (1976), Posse (1980), Persian Heights (1988)
- St. Leger – (4) – Moon Madness (1986), Toulon (1991), Moonax (1994), Silver Patriarch (1997)
- Sun Chariot Stakes – (2) – Sweet Farewell (1974), Free Guest (1985)
- Sussex Stakes – (6) – Posse (1980), Kings Lake (1981), Warning (1988), Marling (1992), Distant View (1994), Reel Buddy (2003)
- Yorkshire Oaks – (3) – May Hill (1975), Busaca (1977), Ramruma (1999)

Canada

- Canadian International Stakes – (1) – French Glory (1990)

France

- Critérium de Saint-Cloud – (1) – Miserden (1988)
- Grand Prix de Saint-Cloud – (2) – Glint of Gold (1982), Moon Madness (1987)
- Poule d'Essai des Pouliches – (2) – Ukraine Girl (1981), Houseproud (1990)
- Prix de l'Abbaye de Longchamp – (2) – Sharpo (1982), Double Schwartz (1986)
- Prix de l'Arc de Triomphe – (4) – Detroit (1980), Rainbow Quest (1985), Dancing Brave (1986), Trempolino (1987)
- Prix de Diane – (1) – Jolypha (1992)
- Prix de la Forêt – (3) – Brocade (1985), Wolfhound (1992), Indian Lodge (2000)
- Prix Ganay – (1) – Golden Snake (2001)
- Prix d'Ispahan – (1) – Sanglamore (1991)
- Prix Jacques Le Marois – (2) – The Wonder (1982), Lear Fan (1984)
- Prix Jean-Luc Lagardère – (1) – Tenby (1992)
- Prix Jean Prat – (1) – Olden Times (2001)
- Prix du Jockey Club – (3) – Caerleon (1983), Hours After (1988), Sanglamore (1990)
- Prix Lupin – (1) – No Lute (1981)
- Prix Maurice de Gheest – (3) – Beaudelaire (1983), Lead on Time (1986), Interval (1987)
- Prix Morny – (1) – Zafonic (1992)
- Prix du Moulin de Longchamp – (2) – Distant Relative (1990), All at Sea (1992)
- Prix de l'Opéra – (1) – Andromaque (1994)
- Prix Rothschild – (1) – Nashmeel (1987)
- Prix Royal-Oak – (3) – Old Country (1983), Raintrap (1993), Moonax (1994)
- Prix de la Salamandre – (1) – Zafonic (1992)
- Prix Vermeille – (2) – Bint Pasha (1987), Jolypha (1992)

Germany

- Bayerisches Zuchtrennen – (1) – Kaieteur (2002)
- Grosser Preis von Baden – (1) – Glint of Gold (1982)

Hong Kong

- Jockeys' Invitation Race – Destiny (1974)
- Hong Kong Derby – (2) – Breathing Exercise (1975), Grand Duke (1977)
- Queen's Silver Jubilee Challenge Cup – Caerdeon Line (1977)
- St. Andrew's Plate – Seven Stars (1979)
- Hong Kong Gold Cup – Observatory (1979)

(Republic of Ireland) Ireland

- Irish 2,000 Guineas – (3) – Grundy (1975), Kings Lake (1981), Tirol (1990)
- Irish Champion Stakes – (2) – Kings Lake (1981), Sadler's Wells (1984)
- Irish Derby – (4) – Grundy (1975), El Gran Senor (1984), Law Society (1985), Commander in Chief (1993)
- Irish Oaks – (3) – Colorspin (1986), Wemyss Bight (1993), Bolas (1994)
- Irish St. Leger – (1) – Leading Counsel (1985)
- Matron Stakes – (1) – Mighty Fly (1983)
- Moyglare Stud Stakes – (1) – Woodstream (1981)
- National Stakes – (3) – El Gran Senor (1983), Law Society (1984), Danehill Dancer (1995)
- Phoenix Stakes – (3) – Achieved (1981), Digamist (1987), Danehill Dancer (1995)
- Tattersalls Gold Cup – (1) – Batshoof (1990)

Italy

- Derby Italiano – (1) – Old Country (1982)
- Gran Premio del Jockey Club – (2) – Silver Patriarch (1998), Golden Snake (2000)
- Gran Premio di Milano – (1) – Tony Bin (1988)
- Premio Presidente della Repubblica – (1) – Tony Bin (1988)
- Premio Roma – (2) – Knifebox (1993), Taipan (1998)

Japan

- Japan Cup – (1) – Jupiter Island (1986)

Slovakia

- Slovenské Derby – (1) – Lonango (1997)>

United States

- Arlington Million – (1) – Tolomeo (1983)
- Breeders' Cup Sprint – (1) – Sheikh Albadou (1991)
- Breeders' Cup Turf – (1) – Pebbles (1985)
- Man o' War Stakes – (1) – Defensive Play (1990)

== Major wins as a trainer ==
Italy

- Gran Criterium – (1) – Hearts of Fire (2009)
