= Saeed bin Suroor =

Emirati racehorse trainer

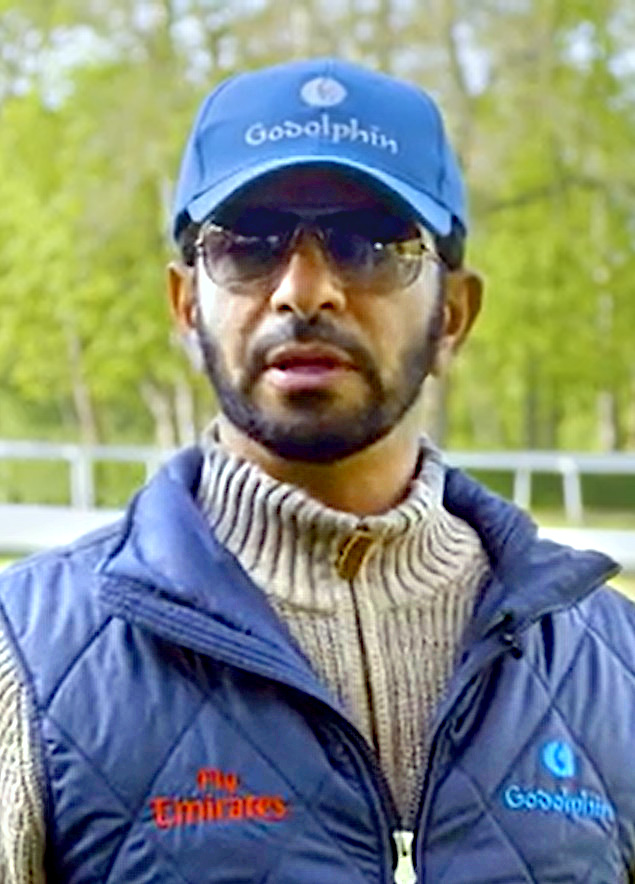
Saeed Bin Suroor in 2017

Saeed bin Suroor (Arabic: سعيد بن سرور; born 16 November 1968 in Dubai) is a horse racing trainer in Great Britain. Formerly a policeman, he took out his training licence in 1995 and the following year was appointed as the trainer for Sheikh Mohammed's Godolphin operation in Newmarket, Suffolk.

He has been British Champion Trainer on four occasions.

== Major wins ==
(United Kingdom) Great Britain

- 1,000 Guineas - (3) - Cape Verdi (1998), Kazzia (2002), Mawj (2023)
- 2,000 Guineas - (2) - Mark of Esteem (1996), Island Sands (1999)
- Ascot Gold Cup - (5) - Classic Cliche (1996), Kayf Tara (1998, 2000), Papineau (2004), Colour Vision (2012)
- Champion Stakes - (1) - Farhh (2013)
- Coronation Cup - (2) - Daylami (1999), Mutafaweq (2001)
- Derby - (1) - Lammtarra (1995)
- Eclipse Stakes - (4) - Halling (1995, 1996), Daylami (1998), Refuse to Bend (2004)
- Fillies' Mile - (1) - White Moonstone (2010)
- Golden Jubilee Stakes - (1) - So Factual (1995)
- Haydock Sprint Cup - (1) - Diktat (1999)
- International Stakes - (4) - Halling (1995, 1996), Sakhee (2001), Sulamani (2004)
- King George VI and Queen Elizabeth Stakes - (5) - Lammtarra (1995), Swain (1997, 1998), Daylami (1999), Doyen (2004)
- Lockinge Stakes - (5) - Cape Cross (1998), Fly to the Stars (1999), Aljabr (2000), Creachadoir (2008), Farhh (2013)
- Nassau Stakes - (1) - Zahrat Dubai (1999)
- Nunthorpe Stakes - (1) - So Factual (1995)
- Oaks - (2) - Moonshell (1995), Kazzia (2002)
- Prince of Wales's Stakes - (4) - Faithful Son (1998), Dubai Millennium (2000), Fantastic Light (2001), Grandera (2002)
- Queen Anne Stakes - (7) - Charnwood Forest (1996), Allied Forces (1997), Intikhab (1998), Cape Cross (1999), Dubai Destination (2003), Refuse to Bend (2004), Ramonti (2007)
- Queen Elizabeth II Stakes - (5) - Mark of Esteem (1996), Dubai Millennium (1999), Summoner (2001), Ramonti (2007), Poet's Voice (2010)
- Racing Post Trophy - (2) - Medaaly (1996), Ibn Khaldun (2007)
- St. James's Palace Stakes - (1) - Shamardal (2005)
- St. Leger - (5) - Classic Cliche (1995), Nedawi (1998), Mutafaweq (1999), Rule of Law (2004), Mastery (2009)
- Sun Chariot Stakes - (1) - Echoes in Eternity (2003)
- Sussex Stakes - (3) - Aljabr (1999), Noverre (2001), Ramonti (2007)
- Yorkshire Oaks - (1) - Punctilious (2005)

Australia

- Caulfield Cup - (2) - All the Good (2008), Best Solution (2018)
- Caulfield Stakes - (1) - Benbatl (2018)
- VRC Queen Elizabeth Stakes - (2) - Hatha Anna (2001), Fantastic Love (2004)
- Zipping Classic - (1) - Beautiful Romance (2016)

Canada

- Canadian International Stakes - (2) - Mutafaweq (2000), Sulamani (2004)
- E. P. Taylor Stakes - (1) - Folk Opera (2008)

France

- Critérium de Saint-Cloud – (1) – Passion for Gold (2009)
- Critérium International - (2) - Thunder Snow (2016), Royal Meeting (2018)
- Poule d'Essai des Poulains - (3) - Vettori (1995), Bachir (2000), Shamardal (2005)
- Prix de l'Arc de Triomphe - (3) - Lammtarra (1995), Sakhee (2001), Marienbard (2002)
- Prix de la Forêt - (1) - Caradak (2006)
- Prix d'Ispahan - (2) - Halling (1996), Best of the Bests (2002)
- Prix Jacques Le Marois - (4) - Dubai Millennium (1999), Muhtathir (2000), Dubawi (2005), Librettist (2006)
- Prix Jean-Luc Lagardère - (2) - Rio de la Plata (2007), Royal Marine (2018)
- Prix Jean Prat - (2) - Almutawakel (1998), Thunder Snow (2017)
- Prix du Jockey Club - (1) - Shamardal (2005)
- Prix Maurice de Gheest - (1) - Diktat (1999)
- Prix du Moulin de Longchamp - (2) - Slickly (2001), Librettist (2006)
- Prix de la Salamandre - (1) - Aljabr (1998)
- Prix Vermeille - (1) - Mezzo Soprano (2003)

Germany

- Bayerisches Zuchtrennen - (3) - Kutub (2001), Benbatl (2018), Tornado Alert (2025)
- Grosser Preis von Baden - (3) - Marienbard (2002), Mamool (2003), Best Solution (2018)
- Grosser Preis von Berlin - (4) - Mutafaweq (2000), Marienbard (2002), Campanologist (2010), Best Solution (2018)
- Preis von Europa - (3) - Kutub (2001), Mamool (2003), Campanologist (2011)
- Rheinland-Pokal - (2) - Cherry Mix (2006), Campanologist (2010)

Hong Kong

- Hong Kong Cup - (1) - Fantastic Light (2000), Ramonti (2007)
- Hong Kong Mile - (1) - Firebreak (2004)
- Hong Kong Vase - (1) - Mastery (2010)
- Queen Elizabeth II Cup - (1) - Overbury (1996)

(Republic of Ireland) Ireland

- Irish 2,000 Guineas - (2) - Bachir (2000), Dubawi (2005)
- Irish Champion Stakes - (4) - Swain (1998), Daylami (1999), Fantastic Light (2001), Grandera (2002)
- Irish St. Leger - (2) - Kayf Tara (1998, 1999)
- National Stakes - (1) - Dubawi (2004)
- Pretty Polly Stakes - (1) - Flagbird (1995)
- Tattersalls Gold Cup - (2) - Daylami (1998), Fantastic Light (2001)

Italy

- Derby Italiano - (3) - Central Park (1998), Mukhalif (1999), Mastery (2009)
- Gran Premio del Jockey Club - (4) - Kutub (2001), Cherry Mix (2005), Schiaparelli (2009), Campanologist (2011)
- Gran Premio di Milano - (1) - Leadership (2003)
- Premio Lydia Tesio - (2) - Najah (2001), Dubai Surprise (2005)
- Premio Presidente della Repubblica - (2) - Flagbird (1995), Central Park (1999)
- Premio Roma - (3) - Cherry Mix (2006), Rio De La Plata (2010), Hunter's Light (2012)
- Premio Vittorio di Capua - (6) - Muhtathir (1999), Slickly (2001, 2002), Ancient World (2004), Gladiatorus (2009), Rio De La Plata (2010)

Japan

- Yasuda Kinen - (1) - Heart Lake (1995)

Singapore

- Singapore Airlines International Cup - (1) - Grandera (2002)

United Arab Emirates

- Dubai Duty Free Stakes - (4) - Tamayaz (1997), Annus Mirabilis (1998), Altibr (1999), Rhythm Band (2000)
- Dubai Golden Shaheen - (1) - Kassbaan (1996)
- Dubai Sheema Classic - (2) - Stowaway (1998), Sulamani (2003)
- Dubai World Cup - (9) - Almutawakel (1999), Dubai Millennium (2000), Street Cry (2002), Moon Ballad (2003), Electrocutionist (2006), African Story (2014), Prince Bishop (2015), Thunder Snow (2018, 2019)

United States

- Arlington Million - (1) - Sulamani (2003)
- Ballerina Stakes - (1) - Music Note (2009)
- Beldame Stakes - (3) - Imperial Gesture (2002), Cocoa Beach (2008), Music Note (2009)
- Beverly D. Stakes - (1) - Crimson Palace (2004)
- Breeders' Cup Juvenile - (1) - Vale of York (2009)
- Breeders' Cup Turf - (2) - Daylami (1999), Fantastic Light (2001)
- Cigar Mile Handicap - (1) - Discreet Cat (2006)
- Coaching Club American Oaks - (2) - Jilbab (2002), Music Note (2008)
- Flower Bowl Invitational Stakes - (1) - Kazzia (2002)
- Gazelle Stakes - (2) - Imperial Gesture (2002), Music Note (2008)
- Man o' War Stakes - (2) - Daylami (1998), Fantastic Light (2000)
- Mother Goose Stakes - (1) - Music Note (2008)
- Ruffian Handicap - (1) - Stellar Jayne (2005)
- San Juan Capistrano Handicap - (1) - Red Bishop (1995)
- Stephen Foster Handicap - (1) - Street Cry (2002)
- Turf Classic Invitational Stakes - (1) - Sulamani (2003)
