= 2006 1000 Guineas =

193rd 1000 Guineas Stakes
- 1000 Guineas
- Location: Newmarket Racecourse
- Date: 7 May 2006
- Winning horse: Speciosa (IRE)
- Jockey: Micky Fenton
- Trainer: Pam Sly (GB)
- Owner: Pam Sly, Michael Sly and Tom Davies

The 2006 1000 Guineas Stakes was a horse race held at Newmarket Racecourse on Sunday 7 May 2006. It was the 193rd running of the 1000 Guineas.

The winner was Pam Sly, Michael Sly and Tom Davies's Speciosa, an Irish-bred bay filly trained by Pam Sly at Thorney in Cambridgeshire and ridden by Micky Fenton. Speciosa's victory was the first in the race for her owner, trainer and jockey. The race was run on soft ground.

== The contenders ==
The race attracted a field of thirteen runners, ten trained in the United Kingdom and three in Ireland: there were no challengers from continental Europe. The favourite was the Ballydoyle-trained Rumplestiltskin who had been named European Champion Two-year old Filly in 2005 when she had won the Moyglare Stud Stakes in Ireland and the Prix Marcel Boussac in France. The other Irish challengers were the favourite's stable companion Race for the Stars (winner of the Oh So Sharp Stakes), and the Tommy Stack-trained Alexander Alliance, who had won a Listed race at the Curragh Racecourse in October. The best of the British-trained runners appeared to be, Silca's Sister (Prix Morny), Flashy Wings (Queen Mary Stakes, Lowther Stakes) and Nannina (Prestige Stakes, Fillies' Mile). Other Group race winners included the Nell Gwyn Stakes winner Speciosa, Nasheej (Sweet Solera Stakes, May Hill Stakes, Fred Darling Stakes), La Chunga (Albany Stakes), Confidential Lady (Prix du Calvados) and Donna Blini (Cherry Hinton Stakes, Cheveley Park Stakes). Rumplestiltskin headed the betting at odds of 3/1 ahead of Silca's Sister (13/2) with Flashy Wings and Nannina on 7/1.

== The race ==
Shortly after the start, the fillies split into two groups across the wide Newmarket straight, with the larger group racing up the stands side (the left of the course from the jockeys' viewpoint), with the smaller group running down the centre of the course. Speciosa headed the stands side group from Confidential Lady and Wake Up Maggie, whilst Donna Blini led the centre group before being overtaken by Nasheej after three furlongs. Speciosa, Confidential Lady and Nasheej held the first three places for the rest of the race, with none of the fillies held up towards the rear making any impact. In the closing stages Speciosa steadily increased her advantage and won by two and a half lengths from Confidential Lady, with Nasheej a length away in third. Silca's Sister took fourth ahead of the outsiders Wake Up Maggie and Spinning Queen, with Rumplestiltskin in seventh.

Speciosa's victory was enthusiastically received by the Newmarket crowd, who gave the filly and her connections three cheers. Pam Sly described the win as being "for all the little people" and the success of a small stable was contrasted with those achieved by the major international racing organisations such as Coolmore and Godolphin.

== Race details ==
- Sponsor: Stan James
- First prize: £187,374
- Surface: Turf
- Going: Soft
- Distance: 8 furlongs
- Number of runners: 13
- Winner's time: 1:40.53

== Full result ==
| Pos. | Marg. | Horse (bred) | Jockey | Trainer (Country) | Odds |
|---|---|---|---|---|---|
| 1 | | Speciosa (IRE) | Micky Fenton | Pam Sly (GB) | 10/1 |
| 2 | 2½ | Confidential Lady (GB) | Seb Sanders | Mark Prescott (GB) | 12/1 |
| 3 | 1 | Nasheej (USA) | Ryan Moore | Richard Hannon, Sr. (GB) | 16/1 |
| 4 | 1½ | Silca's Sister (GB) | Frankie Dettori | Saeed bin Suroor (GB) | 13/2 |
| 5 | 1½ | Wake Up Maggie (IRE) | Alan Munro | Chris Wall (GB) | 25/1 |
| 6 | 2 | Spinning Queen (GB) | Michael Hills | Barry Hills (GB) | 50/1 |
| 7 | 2½ | Rumplestiltskin (IRE) | Kieren Fallon | Aidan O'Brien (IRE) | 3/1 fav |
| 8 | 1½ | Race for the Stars (USA) | Johnny Murtagh | Aidan O'Brien (IRE) | 12/1 |
| 9 | 3½ | La Chunga (USA) | Darryll Holland | Jeremy Noseda (GB) | 33/1 |
| 10 | 5 | Alexander Alliance (IRE) | Wayne Lordan | Tommy Stack (IRE) | 9/1 |
| 11 | shd | Flashy Wings (GB) | Jamie Spencer | Mick Channon (GB) | 7/1 |
| 12 | 3 | Nannina (GB) | Jimmy Fortune | John Gosden (GB) | 7/1 |
| 13 | 10 | Donna Blini (GB) | Mick Kinane | Brian Meehan (GB) | 16/1 |

- Abbreviations: nse = nose; nk = neck; shd = head; hd = head; dist = distance; UR = unseated rider; DSQ = disqualified; PU = pulled up

== Winner's details ==
Further details of the winner, Speciosa

- Foaled: 28 February 2003
- Country: Ireland
- Sire: Danehill Dancer; Dam: Specifically (Sky Classic)
- Owner: Pam Sly, Michael Sly and Tom Davies
- Breeder: K and Mrs Cullen
