= Spinning Queen =

British-bred Thoroughbred racehorse

- Sire: Spinning World
- Grandsire: Nureyev
- Dam: Our Queen of Kings
- Damsire: Arazi
- Sex: Mare
- Foaled: 27 March 2003
- Country: United Kingdom
- Colour: Chestnut
- Breeder: Richard A. N. Bonnycastle & Marston Stud
- Owner: Marston Stud & Cavendish Investing Ltd
- Trainer: Barry Hills
- Record: 15: 4-2-2
- Earnings: £214,132

Major wins
- Eternal Stakes (2006); Brownstown Stakes (2006); Sun Chariot Stakes (2006)

Spinning Queen (foaled 27 March 2003) is a British Thoroughbred racehorse and broodmare best known for her emphatic victory over a top-class field in the 2006 Sun Chariot Stakes. As a two-year-old in 2005 she won on her debut and went on to run prominently in several major races, finishing third in the Cherry Hinton Stakes and fourth in both the Albany Stakes and the Prestige Stakes. In the spring of following year she finished second in the Nell Gwyn Stakes and sixth in the 1000 Guineas before running third in the King Charles II Stakes. She showed improved form in the summer, winning the Eternal Stakes and the Brownstown Stakes. In September 2006 she ended her racing career with a nine-length over Soviet Song, Alexander Goldrun and Red Evie in the Sun Chariot Stakes at Newmarket. She was then sold for a record price of 3 million guineas and was retired from racing. She has subsequently become a successful broodmare.

== Background ==
Spinning Queen is a chestnut mare with a narrow white blaze bred in England by her owners Richard A. N. Bonnycastle & the Oxfordshire-based Marston Stud. She was one of the best horses sired by the outstanding miler Spinning World whose wins included the Irish 2,000 Guineas, Prix Jacques Le Marois, Prix du Moulin and Breeders' Cup Mile. His other progeny included Ancient World (Premio Vittorio di Capua), Special Harmony (Crown Oaks), Thorn Park (Stradbroke Handicap) and Duff (Park Stakes). Spinning Queen's dam Our Queen of Kings was an unraced half-sister of Labeeb (Hollywood Derby) and Fanmore (Arlington Handicap) and a descendant of the influential American broodmare Motto.

During her racing career Spinning Queen was owned in partnership by Marston Stud and Richard Bonnycastle's Cavendish Investing Ltd. She was trained at Lambourn in Berkshire by Barry Hills and was ridden in all but one of her races by the trainer's son Michael Hills.

== Racing career ==
=== 2005: two-year-old season ===
On her racecourse debut, Spinning Queen was ridden by Eddie Ahern in a six furlong maiden race at Haydock Park on 3 June. Starting at odds of 4/1 in a seventeen-runner field she took the lead a quarter of a mile from a finish and drew away to win by four lengths from the colt Mobsir. Spinning Queen was campaigned against top-class opposition in her six subsequent races in 2005 and although she failed to win again she produced several good efforts. In the Albany Stakes, run that year at York Racecourse on 17 June she finished fourth behind La Chunga, Vague and Rumplestiltskin after leading at half way. She then finished third behind Donna Blini in the Cherry Hinton Stakes at Newmarket Racecourse in July and fifth to Nasheej when favourite for the Sweet Solera Stakes over seven furlongs at the same course on 6 August. Later that month she finished fourth to Nannina in the Prestige Stakes at Goodwood Racecourse and was then moved up in distance for the May Hill Stakes over one mile at Doncaster and finished last of the eight runners behind Nasheej. On her final appearance of the season she finished sixth of the fourteen runners behind Speciosa in the Rockfel Stakes at Newmarket on 15 October.

=== 2006: three-year-old season ===
In her first two races of 2006 Spinning Queen was unsuccessfully matched against Speciosa. She finished second to Pam Sly's filly in the Nell Gwyn Stakes in the Nell Gwyn Stakes on 18 April and then started a 50/1 outsider for the 1000 Guineas on 7 May. She finished sixth behind Speciosa but finished ahead of Rumplestiltskin, La Chunga, Nannina and Donna Blini. Three weeks later she was dropped in class for the Listed King Charles II Stakes over seven furlongs at Nemarket and finished third behind the colt Jeremy and the filly Wake Up Maggie.

On 24 June Spinning Queen was one of nine three-year-old fillies to contest the Listed Eternal Stakes at an evening meeting at Warwick Racecourse and started odds-on favourite ahead of Bouboulina who had finished second in the Surrey Stakes. After being restrained by Michael Hills in the early stages, she took the lead a furlong out and won by three lengths from Secret Night. Barry Hills' assistant John Burrows said "Everything dropped right for her tonight, the pace, the ground and the way the race was run. She loves this quick going, and a win like this will do a lot for her confidence". On 8 July the filly was sent to Ireland for the Group Three Brownstown Stakes over seven furlongs at Leopardstown Racecourse and started at odds of 7/2 in an eight-runner field. Wake Up Maggie started favourite whilst the other fancied runners included Violette (Firth of Clyde Stakes) and the Jim Bolger-trained Modeeroch. After racing towards the rear of the field, Spinning Queen began to make progress in the last quarter mile, took second place a furlong out and caught Wake Up Maggie in the final stride to win by a head. Michael Hills commented "Spinning Queen has some turn of foot. She is getting stronger all the time and is getting things together now. She goes on any ground and I'm looking forward to riding her in some good races. She's on the way up". In the Oak Tree Stakes at Goodwood on 4 August Spinning Queen could not recover after being hampered in the final furlong and finished fifth, four lengths behind the winner Red Evie.

The Dubai Duty Free Cup at Newbury Racecourse saw Spinning Queen matched against older horses for the first time. Starting at odds of 14/1 she finished strongly to take second place, a neck behind the five-year-old Sleeping Indian. The other beaten horses included Satchem (Joel Stakes) and Cesare (Royal Hunt Cup). Fifteen days later, on 30 September, Spinning Queen started the 12/1 outsider in a five-runner field for the Group One Sun Chariot Stakes over one mile on good to soft ground at Newmarket. Alexander Goldrun started favourite ahead of Red Evie, Soviet Song and the Atalanta Stakes winner Musicanna. The field would have been even stronger but for the late withdrawal of both Speciosa and Peeress. In a change of tactics Michael Hills sent the filly into the lead from the start and Spinning Queen produced a career-best performance, drawing away from her opponents in the final furlong to win by nine lengths from Soviet Song. After the race Barry Hills said "She's tough, and she always runs good, solid races. But the original plan had been to go for the Challenge Stakes. But then we thought, 'if you're not in it you can't win it'. We did work out how to try to do it beforehand. There would have been no point at all in trying to beat Classic standard horses from behind, so the only way to do it was to wind it up from the front. They were hold-up horses, we got the script right and it's nice to see artistry can still have its day".

== Breeding record ==
At the end of her racing career Spinning Queen was put up for auction in the Tattersalls December Sale at Newmarket. Despite strong interest from the representative of Darley Stud she was bought by the bloodstock agent James Wigan for a sale record price of 3,000,000 guineas, on behalf of the Rothschild family. Her first five foals all won races. Her recorded offspring are:

- Trade Commissioner, a bay colt (later gelded), foaled in 2008, sired by Montjeu. Won three races in Europe: also raced in Australia.
- Gallipot, bay filly, 2009, by Galileo. Won three races including Princess Royal Stakes.
- First Secretary, bay filly, 2010, by Nayef. Won one race.
- The Third Man, grey colt (later gelded), 2011, by Dalakhani. Won two races.
- Peterhof, bay colt, 2012, by Dansili. Won one race.
- Peterport, bay colt, 2014, by Nathaniel

== Pedigree ==
Pedigree of Spinning Queen (GB), chestnut mare, 2003
Sire Spinning World (USA) 1993	Nureyev (USA); 1977	Northern Dancer	Nearctic
Sire Spinning World (USA) 1993	Nureyev (USA); 1977	Northern Dancer	Natalma
Sire Spinning World (USA) 1993	Nureyev (USA); 1977	Special	Forli
Sire Spinning World (USA) 1993	Nureyev (USA); 1977	Special	Thong
Sire Spinning World (USA) 1993	Imperfect Circle (USA); 1988	Mr. Prospector	Never Bend
Sire Spinning World (USA) 1993	Imperfect Circle (USA); 1988	Mr. Prospector	River Lady
Sire Spinning World (USA) 1993	Imperfect Circle (USA); 1988	Aviance	Northfields
Sire Spinning World (USA) 1993	Imperfect Circle (USA); 1988	Aviance	Minnie Hauk
Dam Our Queen of Kings (GB) 1997	Arazi (USA); 1989	Blushing Groom	Red God
Dam Our Queen of Kings (GB) 1997	Arazi (USA); 1989	Blushing Groom	Runaway Bride
Dam Our Queen of Kings (GB) 1997	Arazi (USA); 1989	Danseur Fabuleux	Northern Dancer
Dam Our Queen of Kings (GB) 1997	Arazi (USA); 1989	Danseur Fabuleux	Fabuleux Jane
Dam Our Queen of Kings (GB) 1997	Lady Blackfoot (IRE); 1978	Prince Tenderfoot	Blue Prince
Dam Our Queen of Kings (GB) 1997	Lady Blackfoot (IRE); 1978	Prince Tenderfoot	La Tendresse
Dam Our Queen of Kings (GB) 1997	Lady Blackfoot (IRE); 1978	Indian Graduate	Chieftain
Dam Our Queen of Kings (GB) 1997	Lady Blackfoot (IRE); 1978	Indian Graduate	Cap and Gown (Family: 13-b)

- Spinning Queen is inbred 3 × 4 to Northern Dancer, meaning that this stallion appears in both the third and fourth generations of her pedigree.
