= Confidential Lady (horse) =

British-bred Thoroughbred racehorse

- Sire: Singspiel
- Grandsire: In The Wings
- Dam: Confidante
- Damsire: Dayjur
- Sex: Mare
- Foaled: 4 April 2003
- Country: United Kingdom
- Colour: Bay
- Breeder: Cheveley Park Stud
- Owner: Cheveley Park Stud
- Trainer: Mark Prescott
- Record: 14: 5-3-1
- Earnings: £509,255

Major wins
- Star Stakes (2005); Prix du Calvados (2005); Prix de Diane (2006)

Confidential Lady (foaled 4 April 2003) is a British Thoroughbred racehorse and broodmare. As a juvenile in 2005 she showed high-class form, winning four of her seven races including the Star Stakes and the Prix du Calvados. In the following year she finished second in the 1000 Guineas before recording her biggest win in the Prix de Diane. She failed to win in four subsequent races although she ran second in the Premio Lydia Tesio and was not disgraced when finishing fifth in the Champion Stakes. She has had some success as a broodmare.

== Background ==
Confidential Lady is a bay mare bred and owned by the Newmarket-based Cheveley Park Stud. She was trained throughout her racing career by Mark Prescott at the Heath House stable in Newmarket and ridden in all but one of her races by Seb Sanders.

She was sired by Singspiel, an international campaigner whose wins included the Canadian International Stakes, Japan Cup, Dubai World Cup, Coronation Cup, and International Stakes. The best of his other progeny include Moon Ballad Solow and Dar Re Mi. Confidential Lady's dam Confidante showed modest racing ability, winning two minor races in 1998, and was a daughter of Won't She Tell, a half sister to Affirmed.

== Racing career ==
=== 2005: two-year-old season ===
On her racecourse debut, Confidential Lady started the 2/1 favourite for a maiden race over six furlongs at Hamilton Park Racecourse on 8 June and finished third behind Original Source and Rainbow Bay. Three weeks later she started 5/6 favourite for a similar event over seven furlongs on firm ground at Catterick and recorded her first success as she led from start and came home three and a half lengths clear of her seven opponents. Three days after her win at Catterick, the filly was back on the track for a minor event at Beverley Racecourse and won again, making all the running and finishing two lengths in front of Jeu de Mot. On 21 July Confidential Lady was stepped up in class for the Listed Star Stakes over seven furlongs at Sandown Park and was made the 11/2 second favourite in an eleven-runner field. She went to the front soon after the start, went clear of the field in the last quarter mile and won "comfortably" from the favourite Vague (runner-up in the Albany Stakes) with Nasheej in third place.

Confidential Lady was moved up in class again for the Group 3 Sweet Solera Stakes at Newmarket Racecourse on 6 August and started the 11/4 second favourite behind Spinning Queen. She took lead at halfway but was caught in the final strides and beaten a head by Nasheej. Two weeks after her defeat at Newmarket, the filly was sent to France to contest the Prix du Calvados over 1400 metres on very soft ground at Deauville Racecourse. Ridden by the French jockey Jean-Bernard Eyquem she led from the start and kept on strongly to win by one and a half lengths from the Criquette Head-trained favourite Quiet Royal. For her final run of the year, Confidential Lady returned to France for the Group 1 Prix Marcel Boussac at Longchamp Racecourse on 2 October. She raced in second place for most of the way but weakened in the closing stages and came home tenth of the fourteen runners behind Rumplestiltskin.

=== 2006: three-year-old season ===
Confidential Lady began her second campaign in the 1000 Guineas over the Rowley Mile at Newmarket on 7 May and started at odds of 12/1 in a thirteen-runner field. She tracked the front-running Speciosa for most of the way but was unable to close the gap in the final stages and was beaten two and a half lengths into second place. Those finishing behind included Nasheej, Spinning Queen, Rumplestiltskin, Nannina and Donna Blini. Three weeks later the filly was made the 5/2 favourite for the Irish 1000 Guineas on heavy ground at the Curragh but after leading for most of the way she tired in the last quarter mile and came home sixth of the fifteen runners behind Nightime.

On 11 June Confidential Lady was sent to France again for the Prix de Diane over 2100 metres at Chantilly Racecourse and was made the 8/1 fifth choice in the betting by British bookmakers but went off at 43/1 on the French pari-mutuel. Germance (Prix Saint-Alary) started favourite, while the best fancied of the other fourteen runners were Daltaya (Prix de la Grotte), Alloway (Prix Cléopâtre) and Queen Cleopatra (Derrinstown Stud 1,000 Guineas Trial). In a change of tactics Confidential Lady was restrained by Sanders in the early stages before moving up on the inside to make the final turn in fifth place. She was switched to the left in the straight, overtook the leader Germance 200 metres and won by one and a half lengths from the favourite with Queen Cleopatra a nose away in third. Her winning time of 2:05.9 equaled the race record set by Lypharita in 1985. Mark Prescott, who was winning a first classic race in a 35-year training career said "We were lucky with the draw, we were lucky knowing that there would be a strong pace and we were very lucky that the filly was tough enough to take a race like this only two weeks after that slightly disappointing run in Ireland. But she'll have a bit of a breather now, which she thoroughly deserves".

Five weeks after her win at Chantilly, Confidential Lady was stepped up in distance for the Irish Oaks over one and a half miles at the Curragh but made little impression and came home fifth of the six runners behind Alexandrova. After a break of almost three months, the filly returned at Newmarket in October when she was the only three-year-old filly in the eight-runner field for the Champion Stakes over ten furlongs. She ran fifth behind the six-year-old mare Pride with Sir Percy and Notnowcato finishing behind. Confidential Lady ended her season with a trip to Italy for the Premio Lydia Tesio over 2000 metres at Capannelle Racecourse in Rome, in which she was beaten into second place by the German-trained four-year-old Floriot.

Confidential Lady returned for one more race in 2007 but showed no signs of her old form as she came home last of the fourteen runners in the Doonside Cup at Ayr Racecourse on 22 September.

== Breeding record ==
At the end of her racing career, Confidential Lady was retired to become a broodmare at Cheveley Park. Her offspring include:

- Code Cracker, a filly, foaled in 2009, sired by Medicean. Failed to win in three races.
- Privacy Order, bay filly, 2010, by Azamour. Failed to win in three races.
- Untold Secret, bay colt (later gelded), 2012, by Shamardal. Won two races.
- Red Box, bay filly, 2013, by Exceed and Excel. Won three races including the Valiant Stakes.
- Private View, bay filly, 2015, by Exceed and Excel. Failed to win in three races.

== Pedigree ==
Pedigree of Confidential Lady, bay mare, 2003
Sire Singspiel (IRE) 1992	In the Wings (GB); 1986	Sadler's Wells (USA)	Northern Dancer (CAN)
Sire Singspiel (IRE) 1992	In the Wings (GB); 1986	Sadler's Wells (USA)	Fairy Bridge
Sire Singspiel (IRE) 1992	In the Wings (GB); 1986	High Hawk (IRE)	Shirley Heights (GB)
Sire Singspiel (IRE) 1992	In the Wings (GB); 1986	High Hawk (IRE)	Sunbittern (GB)
Sire Singspiel (IRE) 1992	Glorious Song (CAN); 1976	Halo (USA)	Hail To Reason
Sire Singspiel (IRE) 1992	Glorious Song (CAN); 1976	Halo (USA)	Cosmah
Sire Singspiel (IRE) 1992	Glorious Song (CAN); 1976	Ballade (USA)	Herbager (FR)
Sire Singspiel (IRE) 1992	Glorious Song (CAN); 1976	Ballade (USA)	Miss Swapsco
Dam Confidante (USA) 1995	Dayjur (USA); 1987	Danzig	Northern Dancer (CAN)
Dam Confidante (USA) 1995	Dayjur (USA); 1987	Danzig	Pas de Nom
Dam Confidante (USA) 1995	Dayjur (USA); 1987	Gold Beauty	Mr. Prospector
Dam Confidante (USA) 1995	Dayjur (USA); 1987	Gold Beauty	Stick To Beauty
Dam Confidante (USA) 1995	Won't She Tell (USA); 1984	Banner Sport	Raise a Native
Dam Confidante (USA) 1995	Won't She Tell (USA); 1984	Banner Sport	La Dauphine
Dam Confidante (USA) 1995	Won't She Tell (USA); 1984	Won't Tell You	Crafty Admiral
Dam Confidante (USA) 1995	Won't She Tell (USA); 1984	Won't Tell You	Scarlet Ribbon (Family: 23-b)

- Confidential Lady was inbred 4 × 4 to Northern Dancer, meaning that this stallion appears twice in the fourth generation of her pedigree.
