= Star Stakes =

Flat horse race in Britain

Star Stakes
2026
Aperoll	Bayside View	Tall Trees

Previous years
2025
Hope Queen	Jennifer Jane	Orion's Belt
2024
Celestial Orbit	Anshoda	Flaming Stone
2023
Shuwari	Fallen Angel	Soprano
2022
Dance In The Grass	Fairy Cross	Lady Alara
2021
Inspiral	Wild Beauty	Sunstrike

2020-2011
2020
Fev Rover	Dubai Fountain	Setarhe
2019
Walk In Marrakesh	Light Blush	Rhea
2018
Look Around	Ajrar	La Pelosa
2017
Tajaanus	Capomento	Billesdon Brook
2016
On Her Toes	Calare	Grizzel
2015
Fireglow	Dessertoflife	Raaqy
2014
Alonsoa	Pack Together	Bonnie Grey
2013
Majeyda	Qawaasem	Lamar
2012
Roz	Savanna La Mar	Purr Along
2011
Kinetica	Arsaadi	Hawfinch

2010-2001
2010
Lily Again	Cochabamba	Crying Lightening
2009
Mudaaraah	Middle Club	Bikini Babe
2008
Honest Quality	Beat Seven	Touching
2007
Muthabara	Lady Deauville	Hobby
2006
Sudoor	Precocious Star	Harvest Joy
2005
Confidential Lady	Vague	Nasheej
2004
Queen of Poland	Maids Causeway	Bentley's Bush
2003
Lucky Pipit	America America	Leopard Hunt
2002
Sister Bluebird	Ribbons And Bows	Mail The Desert
2001
Echo River	Sophorific	La Martina

2000-1991
2000
Silver Jorden	Hotelgenie Dot Com	Bring Plenty
1999
Hypnotize	Perugia	Marah
1998
Fairy Queen	Wince	Penmayne
1997
Woodland Melody	Eloquent	Forum
1996
Red Camellia	Yashmak	Lycility
1995
Tamnia	Solar Crystal	Lac Dessert
1994
Subya	Miasma	Queenfisher
1993
News And Echo	Overact	A Smooth One
1992
Bright Generation	Nuryandra	East Liberty
1991
Jammaayil	Flourishing	Sharriba

1990-1988
1990
Shimmering Sea	Glowing Ardour	Cloche D'Or
1989
Spurned	Fujaiyrah	Long Island
1988
Island Mead	Monks Folie	Alsabiha

The Star Stakes is a Listed flat horse race in Great Britain open to fillies aged two years only. It is run at Sandown Park over a distance of 7 furlongs (1,408 metres), and it is scheduled to take place each year in July.

The race was originally run in 1979 over 5 furlongs and also run under the title of the Milcars Fillies' Stakes. It was given its current name and awarded Listed status in 1994.

== Records ==
Leading jockey (4 wins):

- Frankie Dettori - Fairy Queen (1998), On Her Toes (2016), Walk In Marrakesh (2019), Inspiral (2021)

Leading trainer (6 wins):

- John Dunlop – Subya (1994), Tamnia (1995), Silver Jorden (2000), Sudoor (2006), Muthabara (2007), Mudaaraah (2009)

== Winners ==
Year	Winner	Jockey	Trainer	Time
1979	Durandal	Pat Eddery	Ron Boss	1:01.56
1980	Mattaboy	Lester Piggott	Robert Armstrong	1:02.21
1981	My Dad Tom	Steve Cauthen	Barry Hills	1:02.33
1982	Times Time	Ian Johnson	Walter Wharton	0:59.48
1983	Pacific King	Tony Ives	Bill O'Gorman	0:59.63
1984	Provideo	Tony Ives	Bill O'Gorman	1:01.22
1985	Katayla	Walter Swinburn	Michael Stoute	1:00.05
1986	Born To Race	Ray Cochrane	Lester Piggott	1:02.77
1987	Blues Indigo	Bob Curant	Walter Wharton	1:03.96
1988	Island Mead	John Matthias	Ian Balding	1:30.17
1989	Spurned	John Matthias	Ian Balding	1:30.38
1990	Shimmering Sea	Steve Cauthen	Dick Hern	1:31.95
1991	Jammaayil	Pat Eddery	Michael Stoute	1:36.62
1992	Bright Generation	Alan Munro	Paul Cole	1:31.47
1993	News And Echo	Walter Swinburn	Paul Kelleway	1:38.17
1994	Subya	Willie Carson	John Dunlop	1:30.76
1995	Tamnia	John Reid	John Dunlop	1:31.06
1996	Red Camellia	Richard Quinn	Sir Mark Prescott	1:27.87
1997	Woodland Melody	John Reid	Peter Chapple-Hyam	1:29.76
1998	Fairy Queen	Frankie Dettori	David Loder	1:30.48
1999	Hypnotize	Gary Stevens	Michael Stoute	1:30.48
2000	Silver Jorden	Richard Quinn	John Dunlop	1:29.55
2001	Echo River	Jamie Spencer	David Loder	1:29.36
2002	Sister Bluebird	Pat Eddery	Brian Meehan	1:30.57
2003	Lucky Pipit	Michael Hills	Barry Hills	1:28.49
2004	Queen of Poland	Tom Queally	David Loder	1:29.67
2005	Confidential Lady	Seb Sanders	Sir Mark Prescott	1:28.45
2006	Sudoor	Richard Hills	John Dunlop	1:28.12
2007	Muthabara	Richard Hills	John Dunlop	1:30.35
2008	Honest Quality	Ted Durcan	Henry Cecil	1:28.25
2009	Mudaaraah	Richard Hills	John Dunlop	1:28.86
2010	Lily Again	Jamie Spencer	Paul Cole	1:31.71
2011	Kinetica	Seb Sanders	Sir Mark Prescott	1:33.25
2012	Roz	Jim Crowley	Harry Dunlop	1:28.22
2013	Majeyda	Mickael Barzalona	Saeed bin Suroor	1:32.57
2014	Alonsoa	Dane O'Neill	Henry Candy	1:27.98
2015	Fireglow	William Buick	Mark Johnston	1:28.89
2016	On Her Toes	Frankie Dettori	William Haggas	1:31.86
2017	Tajaanus	Jim Crowley	Richard Hannon Jr.	1:30.76
2018	Look Around	Oisin Murphy	Andrew Balding	1:30.08
2019	Walk In Marrakesh	Frankie Dettori	Mark Johnston	1:29.53
2020	Fev Rover	Ben Curtis	Richard Fahey	1:28.22
2021	Inspiral	Frankie Dettori	John & Thady Gosden	1:28.17
2022	Dance In The Grass	Silvestre De Sousa	Charlie & Mark Johnston	1:30.16
2023	Shuwari	Oisin Murphy	Ollie Sangster	1:32.83
2024	Celestial Orbit	Jamie Spencer	Ollie Sangster	1:30.37
2025	Hope Queen	Clifford Lee	Karl Burke	1:30.44
2026	Aperoll	Pat Dobbs	Richard Hannon Jr.	1:30.56

== See also ==
- Horse racing in Great Britain
- List of British flat horse races
