= Eternal Stakes =

Flat horse race in Britain

Eternal Stakes
2026
| Ellusive Butterfly | Just A Girl | Stimulative Trip |

Previous years
2025
Saqqara Sands | Fleetwater | Glamis Road
2024
Jabaara | Key To Cotai | Heritage House
2023
Vetiver | Dandy Alys | Lady Onyx
2022
Oscula | Honey Sweet | Eidikos
2021
Meu Amor | Thunder Beauty | Cloudy Dawn

2020-2011
2020
Under The Stars | Jovial | Althiqa
2019
Tapisserie | Cava | Viadera
2018
Dance Diva | Clubbable | Miss Bar Beach
2017
Elusive Beauty | Bletchley | Aurora Butterfly
2016
Opal Tiara | Red Box | Eternally
2015
Excilly | Calypso Beat | Touchline
2014
Evita Peron | Penny Drops | Swift Campaign
2013
Winning Express | Exactement | Victrix Ludorum
2012
Radio Gaga | Switcher | Roger Sez
2011
Khor Sheed | Sweetie Time | Masaya

2010-2003
2010
Seta | Bahati | Dever Dream
2009
Golden Stream | Damaniyat Girl | Select
2008
Clifton Dancer | Lesson In Humility | Kylayne
2007
Ponty Rossa | Nans Joy | Mimisel
2006
Spinning Queen | Secret Night | Ooh Aah Camara
2005
Nufoos | Improvise | Element of Truth
2004
Lucky Spin | Lucky Pipit | Kunda
2003
Tora Bora | Littleton Arwen | Topkamp

The Eternal Stakes is a Listed flat horse race in Great Britain open to fillies aged three years only. It is run at Carlisle over a distance of 6 furlongs and 195 yards (1,383 metres), and it is scheduled to take place each year in June.

The race was first run in 2003 at Warwick. It was staged at Newmarket in 2014 and was run at Carlisle for the first time in 2015.

== Records ==
Leading jockey (3 wins):

- Kieren Fallon – Lucky Spin (2004), Seta (2010), Khor Sheed (2011)
- Richard Kingscote – Clifton Dancer (2008), Excilly (2015), Meu Amor (2021)

Leading trainer (3 wins):

- Ralph Beckett - Evita Peron (2014), Meu Amor (2021), Saqqara Sands (2025)

== Winners ==
| Year | Winner | Jockey | Trainer | Time |
|---|---|---|---|---|
| 2003 | Tora Bora | John Egan | Paul D'Arcy | 1:22.41 |
| 2004 | Lucky Spin | Kieren Fallon | Richard Hannon Sr. | 1:21.26 |
| 2005 | Nufoos | Richard Hills | Mark Johnston | 1:22.42 |
| 2006 | Spinning Queen | Michael Hills | Barry Hills | 1:21.62 |
| 2007 | Ponty Rossa | David Allan | Tim Easterby | 1:28.59 |
| 2008 | Clifton Dancer | Richard Kingscote | Tom Dascombe | 1:21.80 |
| 2009 | Golden Stream | Jamie Spencer | Sir Michael Stoute | 1:22.38 |
| 2010 | Seta | Kieren Fallon | Luca Cumani | 1:22.97 |
| 2011 | Khor Sheed | Kieren Fallon | Luca Cumani | 1:23.80 |
| 2012 | Radio Gaga | Richard Mullen | Ed McMahon | 1:26.58 |
| 2013 | Winning Express | James Doyle | Ed McMahon | 1:23.19 |
| 2014 | Evita Peron | Jim Crowley | Ralph Beckett | 1:27.81 |
| 2015 | Excilly | Richard Kingscote | Tom Dascombe | 1:26.40 |
| 2016 | Opal Tiara | Graham Gibbons | Mick Channon | 1:24.58 |
| 2017 | Elusive Beauty | Danny Tudhope | Ken Condon | 1:29.79 |
| 2018 | Dance Diva | Paul Hanagan | Richard Fahey | 1:24.36 |
| 2019 | Tapisserie | Paul Hanagan | William Haggas | 1:25.95 |
| 2020 (Note: The 2020 race was run at Haydock Park due to the COVID-19 pandemic in the United Kingdom) | Under The Stars | P. J. McDonald | James Tate | 1:25.80 |
| 2021 | Meu Amor | Richard Kingscote | Ralph Beckett | 1:26.21 |
| 2022 | Oscula | Ben Curtis | George Boughey | 1:25.46 |
| 2023 | Vetiver | P. J. McDonald | Andrew Balding | 1:29.98 |
| 2024 | Jabaara | James Doyle | Roger Varian | 1:26.25 |
| 2025 | Saqqara Sands | Rossa Ryan | Ralph Beckett | 1:30.42 |
| 2026 | Ellusive Butterfly | Clifford Lee | Karl Burke | 1:25.33 |

== See also ==
- Horse racing in Great Britain
- List of British flat horse races
