= Inspiral (horse) =

British Thoroughbred racehorse

- Racing silks of Cheveley Park Stud
- Sire: Frankel
- Grandsire: Galileo
- Dam: Starscope
- Damsire: Selkirk
- Sex: Filly
- Foaled: 14 March 2019 (age 7)
- Country: United Kingdom
- Colour: Bay
- Breeder: Cheveley Park Stud
- Owner: Cheveley Park Stud
- Trainer: John Gosden & Thady Gosden
- Record: 13: 9-2-0
- Earnings: US$3,639,932

Major wins
- Star Stakes (2021); May Hill Stakes (2021); Fillies' Mile (2021); Coronation Stakes (2022); Prix Jacques Le Marois (2022, 2023); Sun Chariot Stakes (2023); Breeders' Cup Filly & Mare Turf (2023)

Awards
- Cartier Champion Two-year-old Filly (2021); U.S. Champion Female Turf Horse (2023); Timeform rating: 128
- Last updated on 31 July 2025

Inspiral (foaled 14 March 2019) is a British Thoroughbred racehorse. She was one of the leading two-year-olds in Europe in 2021 when she was unbeaten in four races, including the Fillies' Mile. As a three-year-old she won the Coronation Stakes and the Prix Jacques Le Marois, which she retained as a four-year-old in 2023, as well as winning the Sun Chariot Stakes. In November of that year, Inspiral won the Breeders' Cup Filly & Mare Turf and was awarded the Eclipse award as American Champion Female Turf Horse.

== Background ==
Inspiral is a bay filly with a white blaze bred and owned by the Newmarket-based Cheveley Park Stud. She was sent into training with John and Thady Gosden at Clarehaven Stables.

She was from the sixth crop of foals sired by Frankel, an undefeated racehorse whose other progeny have included Cracksman, Adayar, Soul Stirring and Hurricane Lane. Inspiral's dam Starscope won only one minor race but was a top-class performer who finished second in both the 1000 Guineas and the Coronation Stakes. Starscope's dam Moon Goddess was a half-sister to Medicean and a descendant of the broodmare Life Hill, making her a distant relative of Sherluck and Caro.

== Racing career ==
=== 2021: two-year-old season ===
Inspiral made her track debut in a maiden race over seven furlongs at Newmarket Racecourse on 26 June when she was ridden by Robert Havlin and started the 2/1 joint-favourite. After starting slowly she made steady progress in the last quarter mile, gained the advantage in the closing stages and won by one and a half lengths from Ardbraccan and Calm Skies. Frankie Dettori took over from Havlin when the filly was stepped up in class and started favourite for the Listed Star Stakes at Sandown Park on 22 July. After being restrained in the early stages Inspiral went to the front approaching the final furlong and drew away to win "comfortably" by three and a half lengths from Wild Beauty (later to win the Natalma Stakes). John Gosden commented "She's always been a classy filly. She'd done normal work at home on the bridle and won very nicely at Newmarket... She’s never been in front like that before, so she's done well... She'd shown a lot of ability and I thought she'd enjoy the track here. She'll have no problem getting a mile... she has a big frame, so she doesn't want over-racing this year."

On 9 September at Doncaster Racecourse Inspiral went off at odds of 2/9 for the Group 2 May Hill Stakes over one mile on good to firm ground. She tracked the leaders before going to the front inside the last quarter mile and won "readily" by three and three quarter lengths from Prosperous Voyage despite being eased down by Dettori near the finish. After the race Thady Gosden said "She’s done it very well. Obviously there were a few good fillies in the race and the ground was probably a bit too quick for her, but she showed plenty of class. She an exceptional filly, but if you see her walking around here she’s still got plenty of growing to do, so we’d be hopeful she’ll progress through the winter."

For her final run of the season Inspiral was moved up to Group 1 class for the Fillies' Mile at Newmarket on 8 October when she was again partnered by Dettori. She started the 8/11 favourite in a nine-runner field which also included Wild Beauty, Prosperous Voyage, Mise En Scene (Prestige Stakes), Concert Hall (Weld Park Stakes), Magical Lagoon (Flame of Tara Stakes) and Majestic Glory (Sweet Solera Stakes). After racing towards the rear of the field in the early stages she took the lead approaching the final furlong and pulled away to win by two and a half lengths with Prosperous Voyage taking second place again. John Gosden said "Inspiral is improving with her racing and was pretty professional today. She's a big girl but she's getting stronger all the time. We'll see how she comes through the winter as regards to next year but if we have a cold one with those east winds we could go straight for the 1000 Guineas. She'll get a mile and a quarter no problem."

On 10 November Inspiral was named Champion Two-year-old Filly at the Cartier Racing Awards.

== Statistics ==
Date	Distance	Race	Grade/ Group	Track	Odds	Field	Finish	Winning Time	Winning (Losing) Margin	Jockey	Ref
2021 – two-year-old season
26 Jun 2021	7 furlongs	Maiden		Newmarket	2/1*	8	1	1:27.09	1 1/2 lengths	Robert Havlin	
22 Jul 2021	7 furlongs	Star Stakes	Listed	Sandown Park	Evens*	9	1	1:28.17	3 1/2 lengths	Frankie Dettori	
9 Sep 2021	1 mile	May Hill Stakes	II	Doncaster	2/9*	6	1	1:37.47	3 3/4 lengths	Frankie Dettori	
8 Oct 2021	1 mile	Fillies' Mile	I	Newmarket	8/11*	9	1	1:38.44	2 1/2 lengths	Frankie Dettori	
2022 – three-year-old season
17 Jun 2022	7 furlongs 213 yards	Coronation Stakes	I	Royal Ascot	15/8*	12	1	1:40.70	4 3/4 lengths	Frankie Dettori	
8 Jul 2022	1 mile	Falmouth Stakes	I	Newmarket	1/7*	5	2	1:36.03	(1 3/4 lengths)	Frankie Dettori	
14 Aug 2022	1,600 metres	Prix Jacques Le Marois	I	Deauville	1.80*	9	1	1:34.07	neck	Frankie Dettori	
15 Oct 2022	1 mile	Queen Elizabeth II Stakes	I	Ascot	11/10*	9	6	1:45.53	(5 lengths)	Frankie Dettori	
2023 – four-year-old season
20 Jun 2023	1 mile	Queen Anne Stakes	I	Royal Ascot	11/4	12	2	1:40.70	(neck)	Frankie Dettori	
2 Aug 2023	1 mile	Sussex Stakes	I	Goodwood	5/1	5	5	1:47.16	(8 1/2 lengths)	Frankie Dettori	
13 Aug 2023	1,600 metres	Prix Jacques Le Marois	I	Deauville	7.80	11	1	1:36.62	1 1/4 lengths	Frankie Dettori	
7 Oct 2023	1 mile	Sun Chariot Stakes	I	Newmarket	10/11*	8	1	1:35.65	3 3/4 lengths	Frankie Dettori	
4 Nov 2023	1 1/4 miles	Breeders' Cup Filly & Mare Turf	I	Santa Anita	2.50*	12	1	1:59.06	neck	Frankie Dettori	

Notes:
An (*) asterisk after the odds means Inspiral was the post-time favorite.

== Pedigree ==
Pedigree of Inspiral (GB), bay filly, 2019
Sire Frankel (GB) 2008	Galileo (IRE); 1998	Sadler's Wells (USA)	Northern Dancer (CAN)
Sire Frankel (GB) 2008	Galileo (IRE); 1998	Sadler's Wells (USA)	Fairy Bridge
Sire Frankel (GB) 2008	Galileo (IRE); 1998	Urban Sea (USA)	Miswaki
Sire Frankel (GB) 2008	Galileo (IRE); 1998	Urban Sea (USA)	Allegretta (GB)
Sire Frankel (GB) 2008	Kind (IRE); 2001	Danehill (USA)	Danzig
Sire Frankel (GB) 2008	Kind (IRE); 2001	Danehill (USA)	Razyana
Sire Frankel (GB) 2008	Kind (IRE); 2001	Rainbow Lake (GB)	Rainbow Quest (USA)
Sire Frankel (GB) 2008	Kind (IRE); 2001	Rainbow Lake (GB)	Rockfest (USA)
Dam Starscope (GB) 2009	Selkirk (USA); 1988	Sharpen Up (GB)	Atan (USA)
Dam Starscope (GB) 2009	Selkirk (USA); 1988	Sharpen Up (GB)	Rocchetta
Dam Starscope (GB) 2009	Selkirk (USA); 1988	Annie Edge (IRE)	Nebbiolo (GB)
Dam Starscope (GB) 2009	Selkirk (USA); 1988	Annie Edge (IRE)	Friendly Court
Dam Starscope (GB) 2009	Moon Goddess (GB); 1998	Rainbow Quest (USA)	Blushing Groom (FR)
Dam Starscope (GB) 2009	Moon Goddess (GB); 1998	Rainbow Quest (USA)	I Will Follow
Dam Starscope (GB) 2009	Moon Goddess (GB); 1998	Mystic Goddess (USA)	Storm Bird (CAN)
Dam Starscope (GB) 2009	Moon Goddess (GB); 1998	Mystic Goddess (USA)	Rose Goddess (IRE) (Family: 3-o)

- Inspiral is inbred 3 × 4 to Rainbow Quest, meaning that this stallion appears in both the third and fourth generations of her pedigree.
