= Majestic Roi =

American-bred Thoroughbred racehorse

- Sire: Street Cry
- Grandsire: Machiavellian
- Dam: L'Extra Honor
- Damsire: Hero's Honor
- Sex: Mare
- Foaled: 13 April 2004
- Country: United States
- Colour: Chestnut
- Breeder: Gaines-Gentry Thoroughbreds
- Owner: Jaber Abdullah
- Trainer: Mick Channon
- Record: 16: 3-1-0
- Earnings: £171,757

Major wins
- Fred Darling Stakes (2007); Sun Chariot Stakes (2007)

Majestic Roi (foaled 13 April 2004) is an American-bred, British-trained Thoroughbred racehorse and broodmare. She showed promise as a two-year-old in 2006, winning a maiden race on her second appearance and in the following spring she made an immediate impact with an upset victory in the Fred Darling Stakes. She subsequently finished second in the Prix de Sandringham but was well beaten in her next three races before ending her season with a career-best performance to win the Group One Sun Chariot Stakes at odds of 16/1. She raced eight times without success in 2008 before being retired from the track. She has had some success as a dam of winners.

== Background ==
Majestic Roi is a chestnut mare with a white blaze and white socks on her hind legs bred in Kentucky by Gaines-Gentry Thoroughbreds. She was from the first crop of foals sired by Street Cry who won the Dubai World Cup in 2002 before becoming a very successful breeding stallion in North America and Australasia. His other progeny have included Zenyatta, Street Sense, Shocking and Whobegotyou. Majestic Roi's dam L'Extra Honor was unraced but very well-bred being a granddaughter of the outstanding Canadian racemare Fanfreluche, whose other descendants have included L'Enjoleur and Holy Roman Emperor.

As a yearling, the filly was sent to England was offered for sale at Tattersalls in October where she was bought for 25,000 guineas by the bloodstock agent Gill Richardson. Majestic Roi entered the ownership of Jaber Abdullah and was sent into training with Mick Channon at West Ilsley in Berkshire.

== Racing career ==
=== 2006: two-year-old season ===
On her racecourse debut, Majestic Roi started 13/8 favourite for a six furlong maiden race at Goodwood Racecourse on 24 May but finished seventh of the eight runners. Two weeks later at Hamilton Racecourse she started odds-on favourite for a similar event and won by half a length from Adaptation. The filly's victory made her the first of Street Cry's offspring to win a race.

=== 2007: three-year-old season ===
After an absence of more than ten months, Majestic Roi returned on 21 April to contest the Fred Darling Stakes (a major trial for the 1000 Guineas) over seven furlongs at Newbury Racecourse. The Cheveley Park Stakes winner Indian Ink (ridden by Richard Hughes) started favourite whilst Majestic Roi, ridden by Jamie Spencer started a 25/1 outsider in a thirteen-runner field. After being restrained by Spencer in the early stages, Majestic Roi began to make progress in the last quarter mile, took the lead inside the final furlong and held off the challenge of Indian Ink to win by a neck. Channon commented "She only won her maiden at Hamilton, but I always knew that she was better than that, and she has really come to herself in the past two weeks... she is a class act who will win many more races" whilst Spencer said "We didn't expect to beat Indian Ink, but I followed Richard Hughes through on the favourite and when I saw Hughesie's long legs start to wobble, I knew that we were in business".

In June, Majestic Roi was sent to France for the Prix de Sandringham over 1600 metres at Chantilly Racecourse and finished second to All Is Vanity. At Royal Ascot later in the month she was moved up to Group One class for the Coronation Stakes and finished seventh, eight lengths behind the winner Indian Ink. On 8 August she finished fifth of the sixteen runners behind Wake Up Maggie in the Oak Tree Stakes at Goodwood Racecourse. Majestic Roi was then dropped in class and started favourite for the Listed Sceptre Stakes over seven furlongs at Doncaster Racecourse. Ridden by Darryll Holland, she struggled to obtain a clear run in the last quarter mile but finished strongly and was beaten less than a length into fourth behind Medley.

On her final appearance of the season, Majestic Roi was returned to Group One level for the Sun Chariot Stakes over one mile at Newmarket on 6 October in which she was again partnered by Holland and started a 16/1 outsider. The five-year-old Echelon started favourite after a win in the Matron Stakes, whilst the other seven runners included Simply Perfect, Nannina, Speciosa and Wake Up Maggie. She was restrained towards the rear of the field as Speciosa set the pace, before beginning to make progress three furlongs from the finish. She was switched to the left approaching the final furlong and produced a strong late run to overtake Nannina in the closing stages and win by three quarters of a length. After the race Channon said "She doesn’t like soft ground but the ground was right for her today and that's just fillies at this time of year. I would hope she’ll stay in training next year, she's only just got the hang of racing. Little things have gone wrong all year but she's beginning to settle better. It's a big day for all of us".

=== 2008: four-year-old season ===
Majestic Roi remained in training as a four-year-old in 2008 beginning her season by finishing fifteenth of the sixteen runners behind Jay Peg in the Dubai Duty Free at Nad Al Sheba Racecourse on 29 March. On her return to Europe she failed to recover her form, finishing unplaced in the Lockinge Stakes, fifth in the Diomed Stakes, fourth in the Windsor Forest Stakes, sixth in the Falmouth Stakes and eighth in the Nassau Stakes. In September she was dropped to Listed class for her last two races. She ran fifth in the Dubai Duty Free Cup at Newbury and ended her career by finishing sixth when favourite for the October Stakes at Ascot.

== Breeding record ==
Majestic Roi was retired from racing to become a broodmare for her owner's Rabbah Bloodstock Ltd. Her first four foals all won races:

- Majestic Jasmine, a chestnut filly, foaled in 2101, sired by New Approach. Won four races including the Listed Grosser Preis de Hannoverschen Volksbank.
- Long Cross, bay colt, 2011, by Cape Cross. Won one race.
- Majestic Manner, chestnut filly, 2012, by Dubawi. Won one race.
- Noor Al Hawa, bay colt, 2013, by Makfi. Won one race, the Listed Grosser Preis von Engel & Volkers Düsseldorf – 91st Junioren-Preis.

== Pedigree ==
Pedigree of Majestic Roi (USA), chestnut mare, 2004
Sire Street Cry (IRE) 1998	Machiavellian (USA); 1987	Mr. Prospector	Raise a Native
Sire Street Cry (IRE) 1998	Machiavellian (USA); 1987	Mr. Prospector	Gold Digger
Sire Street Cry (IRE) 1998	Machiavellian (USA); 1987	Coup de Folie	Halo
Sire Street Cry (IRE) 1998	Machiavellian (USA); 1987	Coup de Folie	Raise The Standard
Sire Street Cry (IRE) 1998	Helen Street (GB); 1982	Troy	Petingo
Sire Street Cry (IRE) 1998	Helen Street (GB); 1982	Troy	La Milo
Sire Street Cry (IRE) 1998	Helen Street (GB); 1982	Waterway	Riverman
Sire Street Cry (IRE) 1998	Helen Street (GB); 1982	Waterway	Boulevard
Dam L'Extra Honor (USA) 1987	Hero's Honor (USA); 1980	Northern Dancer	Nearctic
Dam L'Extra Honor (USA) 1987	Hero's Honor (USA); 1980	Northern Dancer	Natalma
Dam L'Extra Honor (USA) 1987	Hero's Honor (USA); 1980	Glowing Tribute	Graustark
Dam L'Extra Honor (USA) 1987	Hero's Honor (USA); 1980	Glowing Tribute	Admiring
Dam L'Extra Honor (USA) 1987	L'Extravagante (CAN); 1973	Le Fabuleux	Wild Risk
Dam L'Extra Honor (USA) 1987	L'Extravagante (CAN); 1973	Le Fabuleux	Anguar
Dam L'Extra Honor (USA) 1987	L'Extravagante (CAN); 1973	Fanfreluche	Northern Dancer
Dam L'Extra Honor (USA) 1987	L'Extravagante (CAN); 1973	Fanfreluche	Ciboulette (Family: 4-g)

- Through her dam Majestic Roi was inbred 3 × 4 to Northern Dancer, meaning that this stallion appears in both the third and fourth generations of her pedigree.
