= Donna Blini =

British-bred Thoroughbred racehorse

- Sire: Bertolini
- Grandsire: Danzig
- Dam: Cal Norma's Lady
- Damsire: Lyphard's Special
- Sex: Mare
- Foaled: 27 March 2003
- Country: United Kingdom
- Colour: Chestnut
- Breeder: James Thom & Sons
- Owner: Jayne Cunningham
- Trainer: Brian Meehan
- Record: 11: 4-2-0
- Earnings: £175,816

Major wins
- Cherry Hinton Stakes (2005); Cheveley Park Stakes (2005)

Donna Blini (foaled 27 March 2003) is a British Thoroughbred racehorse and broodmare. She was one of the best juvenile fillies of her generation in Britain in 2005 when she won three of her four races including the Cherry Hinton Stakes and the Cheveley Park Stakes. In the following year she was mainly campaigned in sprint races and won one minor race from seven starts. She was retired from racing having won four of her eleven races and exported to become a broodmare in Japan. She made an immediate impact as a dam of winners, producing the outstanding racemare Gentildonna.

== Background ==
Donna Blini is a chestnut mare with a white blaze and three white socks bred by James Thom & Sons. Her sire Bertolini was a sprinter who won the July Stakes and the European Free Handicap as well as finishing second in the Middle Park Stakes, Dubai Golden Shaheen, Haydock Sprint Cup and Nunthorpe Stakes. As a breeding stallion, his other progeny included Moorhouse Lad (King George Stakes) and Prime Defender (Duke of York Stakes). Donna Blini's dam, Cal Norma's Lady showed some ability as a racehorse, winning three races as a two-year-old in 1990. She was descended from Fair Astronomer who finished second in the 1000 Guineas and was the ancestor of Malhub (Golden Jubilee Stakes) and Deputy Commander.

As a yearling, the filly was consigned to the Doncaster sales in September 2004 and was bought for 20,000 guineas by the bloodstock agents McKeever St Lawrence. She entered the ownership of Jayne Cunningham and was sent into training with Brian Meehan at the Newlands Stable in Upper Lambourn in Berkshire.

== Racing career ==
=== 2005: two-year-old season ===
Donna Blini made her racecourse debut in a five furlong maiden race at Newmarket Racecourse on 7 May in which she was ridden by Frankie Dettori she started at odds of 4/1 in a nine-runner field. After racing in second place she took the lead approaching the final furlong and won by one and a quarter lengths from the favourite Aliceinwonderland with Dettori easing her down in the final strides. On 1 June, ridden by Jimmy Fortune, she started favourite for the Listed Hilary Needler Trophy at Beverley Racecourse but was beaten a length into second by the 16/1 outsider Clare Hills.

Despite her defeat at Beverley, the filly was moved up in class for the Group Two Cherry Hinton Stakes at Newmarket on 5 July. The National Stakes winner Salut d'Amour started favourite ahead of Nannina, Spinning Queen and Queen of Fire, with Donna Blini fifth in the betting on 12/1. Ridden for the first time by Mick Kinane she led from the start and stayed on well to beat Salut d'Amour by a neck, with Spinning Queen a neck away in third. After the race Meehan said "Whatever happens now, she's already proved herself to be a bargain... Donna's a lovely filly who is a little bit rangy, so we thought we would give her a bit of time and give Royal Ascot a miss. The ground was against her when she finished second at Beverley last time and Jimmy (Fortune) came back and said she wouldn't have been beaten if the ground had been better. She's a tough thing, a real good galloper. She'll go on from this and she definitely wants seven furlongs already".

After a break of twelve weeks, Donna Blini returned for the Group One Cheveley Park Stakes at Newmarket in which she was again partnered by Kinane and started at odds of 12/1 in a ten-runner field. Kinane had sustained a double fracture of the wrist in August and was returning to the saddle after undergoing multiple therapy sessions in a hyperbaric chamber. The undefeated Flashy Wings started favourite after wins in the Queen Mary Stakes and Lowther Stakes whilst the other runners included Nidhaal (Dick Poole Fillies' Stakes), Wake Up Maggie (winner of a valuable sales race in Ireland) and Modeeroch (Tyros Stakes). Donna Blini tracked the 100/1 outsider Dizzy Dreamer before taking the lead approaching the final furlong. She was driven out in the closing stages to win by a neck from Wake Up Maggie with Flashy Wings a neck away in third. After the race Kinane said "Brian gave Donna Blini a break after I won on her in July and when I saw her today she looked marvellous and had really blossomed. We hadn't gone awfully quick, but when I asked her to quicken I knew she would be hard to peg back and she stayed on really well". Meehan commented "She's a lovely filly. She proved it in the Cherry Hinton. We debated going to the Lowther Stakes and all sorts of things, the Moyglare and even the Doncaster sales race with all that money, but we felt it was best to wait and give her time. She's a tough, hardy filly and she galloped all the way to the line. Maybe the break she had made her idle a bit going to the line. We are very pleased with her."

=== 2006: three-year-old season ===
In 2006, Meehan moved his horses to Manton in Wiltshire. On her three-year-old debut Donna Blini started a 16/1 outsider in the 193rd running of the 1000 Guineas at Newmarket on 7 May. She was among the leaders of the group that raced up the centre of the wide Rowley Mile course but faded quickly in the final quarter mile and finished last of the thirteen runners behind Speciosa. She reappeared in the Coronation Stakes at Royal Ascot in June and finished thirteenth of the fifteen runners behind Nannina.

Donna Blini was dropped in class and distance for the Group Three Summer Stakes over six furlongs at York Racecourse on 14 July and finished second to La Chunga having led until the final furlong. A week later she was dropped to five furlongs for a minor race at Newmarket and started 11/4 second favourite behind the five-year-old Majestic Missile whose wins included the Cornwallis Stakes and the Scarbrough Stakes. Ridden by Dettori, she was amongst the leaders from the start and won by three quarters of a length from Majestic Missile with The Trader (Prix du Gros Chêne) in third. Dettori was again in the saddle when the filly contested the Group Three King George Stakes at Goodwood Racecourse on 3 August and finished sixth of the eighteen runners behind the five-year-old mare La Cucaracha.

In September Donna Blini made two further appearances but failed to recover her best form. She finished sixth behind Dixie Belle in the World Trophy at Newbury and eleventh of thirteen behind Fantasy Believer in the Listed Rous Stakes at Newmarket.

== Breeding record ==
At the end of her racing career, Donna Blini was offered for sale at Tattersalls in November 2005 and was bought for 500,000 guineas by Katsumi Yoshida. She was exported to become a broodmare at the Northern Farm in Japan, where she has produced fourteen foals and nine winners:

- Donau Blue, a bay filly, foaled in 2008, sired by Deep Impact. Won five races including the Grade III Kyoto Himba Stakes and Sekiya Kinen: second in the Victoria Mile and third in the Mile Championship.
- Gentildonna, bay filly, 2009, by Deep Impact. Won ten races including the Japan Cup (twice), Arima Kinen, Dubai Sheema Classic, Oka Sho, Yushun Himba and Shuka Sho. Twice voted Japanese Horse of the Year and inducted in to the JRA Hall of Fame.
- Topaz, bay colt, 2010, by Neo Universe. Failed to win in two NAR races.
- Gleann Siara, chestnut colt, 2011, by Zenno Rob Roy. Unraced.
- Legende, bay colt, 2012, by Deep Impact. Won one race.
- Belle Dame, bay mare, 2014, by Deep Impact. Failed to win in three JRA races.
- Virtus, bay mare, 2015, by Deep Impact. Won one race.
- Donna Attraente, dark bay mare, 2016, by Deep Impact. Won four races.
- W Encore, bay mare, 2017, by Deep Impact. Won two races.
- Suleyman, chestnut colt, 2018, by King Kamehameha. Won five races including the Moji Stakes and finished second in the Procyon Stakes and Antares Stakes.
- Methuselah, dark bay colt, 2019, by Kitasan Black. Won five races, four of which were NAR races.
- Istros, bay gelding, 2020, by Lord Kanaloa. Won eight NAR races.
- Henrietta, bay filly, 2022, by Duramente. Failed to win in three JRA races.
- Drefonna, chestnut filly, 2023, by Drefong. Exported and made her debut in Australia.

== Pedigree ==
Pedigree of Donna Blini (GB), chestnut mare, 2003
Sire Bertolini (USA) 1996	Danzig (USA); 1977	Northern Dancer	Nearctic
Sire Bertolini (USA) 1996	Danzig (USA); 1977	Northern Dancer	Natalma
Sire Bertolini (USA) 1996	Danzig (USA); 1977	Pas de Nom	Admiral's Voyage
Sire Bertolini (USA) 1996	Danzig (USA); 1977	Pas de Nom	Petitioner
Sire Bertolini (USA) 1996	Aquilegia (USA); 1989	Alydar	Raise a Native
Sire Bertolini (USA) 1996	Aquilegia (USA); 1989	Alydar	Sweet Tooth
Sire Bertolini (USA) 1996	Aquilegia (USA); 1989	Courtly Dee	Never Bend
Sire Bertolini (USA) 1996	Aquilegia (USA); 1989	Courtly Dee	Tulle
Dam Cal Norma's Lady (IRE) 1988	Lyphard's Special (USA); 1980	Lyphard	Northern Dancer
Dam Cal Norma's Lady (IRE) 1988	Lyphard's Special (USA); 1980	Lyphard	Goofed
Dam Cal Norma's Lady (IRE) 1988	Lyphard's Special (USA); 1980	My Bupers	Bupers
Dam Cal Norma's Lady (IRE) 1988	Lyphard's Special (USA); 1980	My Bupers	Princess Revoked
Dam Cal Norma's Lady (IRE) 1988	June Darling (IRE); 1983	Junius	Raja Baba
Dam Cal Norma's Lady (IRE) 1988	June Darling (IRE); 1983	Junius	Solid Thought
Dam Cal Norma's Lady (IRE) 1988	June Darling (IRE); 1983	Beau Darling	Darling Boy
Dam Cal Norma's Lady (IRE) 1988	June Darling (IRE); 1983	Beau Darling	Fair Astronomer (Family: 16-f)

- Donna Blini is inbred 3 × 4 to Northern Dancer, meaning that this stallion appears in both the third and fourth generations of her pedigree.
