= Nell Gwyn Stakes =

Flat horse race in Britain

- Class: Group 3
- Location: Rowley Mile; Newmarket, England
- Inaugurated: 1961
- Race type: Flat / Thoroughbred
- Sponsor: Lanwades Stud
- Website: Newmarket

Race information
- Distance: 7f (1,408 metres)
- Surface: Turf
- Track: Straight
- Qualification: Three-year-old fillies
- Weight: 9 st 2 lb Penalties; 3 lb for G1 / G2 winners* *after 31 August 2024
- Purse: £85,000 (2025); 1st: £48,204

Nell Gwyn Stakes
2026
Azleet	America Queen	Act Of Kindness

Previous years
2025
Zanzoun	Celestial Orbit	Remaat
2024
Pretty Crystal	Dance Sequence	Kathmandu
2023
Mammas Girl	Fairy Cross	Secret Angel
2022
Cachet	Almohandesah	Hello You
2021
Sacred	Saffron Beach	Love Is You

2020-2011
2019
Qabala	Mot Juste	Angel's Hideaway
2018
Soliloquy	Altyn Orda	Eirene
2017
Daban	Unforgetable Filly	Poet's Vanity
2016
Nathra	Squash	Robanne
2015
Osaila	New Providence	Beautiful Romance
2014
Sandiva	Euro Charline	Majeyda
2013
Hot Snap	Sky Lantern	Winning Express
2012
Esentepe	Nayarra	Lily's Angel
2011
Barefoot Lady	Sing Softly	Maqaasid

2010-2001
2010
Music Show	Blue Maiden	Principal Role
2009
Fantasia	Damaniyat Girl	First City
2008
Infallible	Kylayne	Festivale
2007
Scarlet Runner	Sander Camillo	Blue Rocket
2006
Speciosa	Spinning Queen	Salut d'Amour
2005
Karen's Caper	Cape Columbine	Favourita
2004
Silca's Gift	Incheni	Roseanna
2003
Khulood	Cala	Hector's Girl
2002
Misterah	Massarra	Hiddendale
2001
Lil's Jessy	Zaheemah	Toffee Nosed

2000-1991
2000
Petrushka	Seazun	Aunty Rose
1999
Valentine Waltz	Hawriyah	Circle Of Gold
1998
Cloud Castle	Ashraakat	Jibe
1997
Reunion	Oh Nellie	Elegant Warning
1996
Thrilling Day	Bint Salsabil	Honest Guest
1995
Myself	Epagris	Red Carnival
1994
Mehthaaf	Prophecy	Salvezza
1993
Niche	Zarani Sidi Anna	Sayyedati
1992
A-To-Z	Perfect Circle	Soiree
1991
Crystal Gazing	Tetradonna	Lilian Bayliss

1990-1983
1990
Heart Of Joy	In The Groove	Hasbah
1989
Ensconse	Aldbourne	Muhbubh
1988
Ghariba	Diminuendo	Sudden Love
1987
Martha Stevens	Invited Guest	Raahia
1986
Sonic Lady	Lady Sophie	Ala Mahlik
1985
Oh So Sharp	Bella Colora	Helen Street
1984
Pebbles	Leipzig	Meis El-Reem
1983
Favoridge	Annie Edge	Royal Heroine

The Nell Gwyn Stakes is a Group 3 flat horse race in Great Britain open to three-year-old fillies. It is run over a distance of 7 furlongs (1,408 metres) on the Rowley Mile at Newmarket in mid-April.

== History ==
The event was established in 1961, and it was initially called the Spring Fillies' Stakes. The first running was won by Verbena.

The race was renamed the Nell Gwyn Stakes in 1962. It was named after Nell Gwyn (1650–87), a long-time mistress of King Charles II.

The Nell Gwyn Stakes can serve as a trial for various fillies' Classics in Europe. The last winner to achieve victory in the 1000 Guineas was Cachet in 2022. The last to win the Poule d'Essai des Pouliches was Valentine Waltz in 1999.

The race is currently held on the first day of Newmarket's three-day Craven Meeting. It is run the day before the Craven Stakes.

== Records ==
Leading jockey (7 wins):

- Frankie Dettori - Crystal Gazing (1991), Valentine Waltz (1999), Fantasia (2009), Sandiva (2014), Osaila (2015), Nathra (2016), Daban (2017)

Leading trainer (8 wins):

- Sir Henry Cecil – Caspian (1973), One in a Million (1979), Evita (1980), Fairy Footsteps (1981), Chalon (1982), Oh So Sharp (1985), Martha Stevens (1987), Hot Snap (2013)

== Winners ==
Year	Winner	Jockey	Trainer	Time
1961	Verbena	Doug Smith	Geoffrey Brooke	1:28.66
1962	West Side Story	Eph Smith	Ted Leader	1:29.90
1963	Amicable	Harry Carr	Cecil Boyd-Rochfort	1:30.49
1964	Alborada	Greville Starkey	John Oxley	1:32.96
1965	Gently	Scobie Breasley	Gordon Richards	1:28.97
1966	Hiding Place	Scobie Breasley	Jack Clayton	1:31.86
1967	Cranberry Sauce	George Moore	Noel Murless	1:25.28
1968	Abbie West	Sandy Barclay	Noel Murless	1:29.24
1969	Anchor	Greville Starkey	John Oxley	1:31.08
1970	Obelisk	Sandy Barclay	Noel Murless	1:33.18
1971	Super Honey	Lester Piggott	Ryan Price	1:26.90
1972	Carezza	Willie Carson	Bernard van Cutsem	1:32.15
1973	Caspian	Greville Starkey	Henry Cecil	1:26.42
1974	Angels Two	Eddie Hide	Bill Elsey	1:26.79
1975	Rose Bowl	Lester Piggott	Fulke Johnson Houghton	1:37.49
1976	Flying Water	Yves Saint-Martin	Angel Penna, Sr.	1:25.71
1977	Freeze The Secret	Gianfranco Dettori	Luca Cumani	1:16.14
1978	Seraphima	Pat Eddery	Peter Walwyn	1:29.33
1979	One In A Million	Joe Mercer	Henry Cecil	1:25.85
1980	Evita	Joe Mercer	Henry Cecil	1:26.57
1981	Fairy Footsteps	Lester Piggott	Henry Cecil	1:27.21
1982	Chalon	Lester Piggott	Henry Cecil	1:25.01
1983	Favoridge	Pat Eddery	Geoff Wragg	1:30.15
1984	Pebbles	Philip Robinson	Clive Brittain	1:24.68
1985	Oh So Sharp	Steve Cauthen	Henry Cecil	1:27.19
1986	Sonic Lady	Walter Swinburn	Michael Stoute	1:31.69
1987	Martha Stevens	Steve Cauthen	Henry Cecil	1:27.76
1988	Ghariba	Michael Roberts	Alec Stewart	1:28.63
1989	Ensconse	Ray Cochrane	Luca Cumani	1:27.08
1990	Heart of Joy	Walter Swinburn	Michael Stoute	1:24.58
1991	Crystal Gazing	Frankie Dettori	Luca Cumani	1:25.29
1992	A-to-Z	Michael Hills	Michael Bell	1:27.09
1993	Niche	Lester Piggott	Richard Hannon Sr.	1:27.07
1994	Mehthaaf	Willie Carson	John Dunlop	1:27.50
1995	Myself	John Reid	Peter Chapple-Hyam	1:24.30
1996	Thrilling Day	David Harrison	Neil Graham	1:25.31
1997	Reunion	Richard Hills	John Hills	1:25.28
1998	Cloud Castle	John Reid	Clive Brittain	1:28.85
1999	Valentine Waltz	Frankie Dettori	John Gosden	1:25.64
2000	Petrushka	Kieren Fallon	Sir Michael Stoute	1:25.60
2001	Lil's Jessy	Pat Eddery	Jeremy Noseda	1:26.63
2002	Misterah	Richard Hills	Marcus Tregoning	1:24.72
2003	Khulood	Richard Hills	John Dunlop	1:26.76
2004	Silca's Gift	Ted Durcan	Mick Channon	1:26.81
2005	Karen's Caper	Jimmy Fortune	John Gosden	1:24.72
2006	Speciosa	Micky Fenton	Pam Sly	1:23.45
2007	Scarlet Runner	Kerrin McEvoy	John Dunlop	1:24.59
2008	Infallible	Jimmy Fortune	John Gosden	1:27.15
2009	Fantasia	Frankie Dettori	Luca Cumani	1:26.93
2010	Music Show	Kieren Fallon	Mick Channon	1:25.43
2011	Barefoot Lady	Paul Hanagan	Richard Fahey	1:24.44
2012	Esentepe	Pat Dobbs	Richard Hannon Sr.	1:27.60
2013	Hot Snap	Tom Queally	Sir Henry Cecil	1:24.39
2014	Sandiva	Frankie Dettori	Richard Fahey	1:26.93
2015	Osaila	Frankie Dettori	Richard Hannon Jr.	1:23.24
2016	Nathra	Frankie Dettori	John Gosden	1:28.35
2017	Daban	Frankie Dettori	John Gosden	1:24.42
2018	Soliloquy	William Buick	Charlie Appleby	1:26.67
2019	Qabala	David Egan	Roger Varian	1:25.77
	no race 2020 (Note: The 2020 running was cancelled because of the COVID-19 pandemic in the United Kingdom)
2021	Sacred	Ryan Moore	William Haggas	1:24.89
2022	Cachet	William Buick	George Boughey	1:24.27
2023	Mammas Girl	Sean Levey	Richard Hannon Jr.	1:28.70
2024	Pretty Crystal	Oisin Orr	Richard Fahey	1:22.90
2025	Zanzoun	Kieran Shoemark	John & Thady Gosden	1:29.22
2026	Azleet	Marco Ghiani	Stuart Williams	1:25.08

== See also ==
- Horse racing in Great Britain
- List of British flat horse races
