= Spinning World =

American-bred Thoroughbred racehorse

- Sire: Nureyev
- Grandsire: Northern Dancer
- Dam: Imperfect Circle
- Damsire: Riverman
- Sex: Stallion
- Foaled: 1993
- Country: United States
- Colour: chestnut
- Breeder: Stavros Niarchos
- Owner: Niarchos family
- Trainer: Jonathan Pease
- Record: 14: 8-3-1
- Earnings: $1,734,477

Major wins
- Prix Saint-Roman (1995); Irish 2,000 Guineas (1996); Prix Jacques Le Marois (1996 & 1997); Prix du Muguet (1997); Prix du Moulin (1997); Breeders' Cup Mile (1997)

Awards
- Champion Three-Year-Old in Ireland (1996); Champion Older Horse in France (1997)
- Last updated on February 5, 2007

Spinning World (foaled 1993 in Kentucky, United States) is a French thoroughbred racehorse who was one of the top European milers during the 1990s.

After winning the 1996 Irish 2,000 Guineas at The Curragh in Ireland, the first French horse ever to do so, and the Prix Jacques Le Marois at Deauville Racecourse in France, Spinning World finished second to Da Hoss in the Breeders' Cup Mile at Woodbine Racetrack in Toronto, Ontario, Canada. Following more Group One wins in 1997 in France, he returned for the Breeders' Cup Mile at Hollywood Park Racetrack, USA, which he won while equaling the track record.

Spinning World was retired to stud duty after the 1997 racing season. He stood at Coolmore Stud in Ireland, and has been shuttled to Ashford Stud in Kentucky and to Coolmore operations in New Zealand and Australia. Among his offspring is Spinning Queen (born 2003), the 2006 winner of the Group One Sun Chariot Stakes at Newmarket Racecourse, UK. In November 2006, she became the most expensive filly and second most expensive horse ever sold at public auction in Europe at a price of three million guineas.
