= Prix du Calvados =

Flat horse race in France

- Class: Group 2
- Location: Deauville Racecourse; Deauville, France
- Inaugurated: 1970
- Race type: Flat / Thoroughbred
- Sponsor: Shadwell Racing
- Website: france-galop.com

Race information
- Distance: 1,400 metres (7f)
- Surface: Turf
- Track: Straight
- Qualification: Two-year-old fillies excluding Group 2 winners
- Weight: 55 kg Penalties; 3 kg for Group 3 winners
- Purse: €130,000 (2021); 1st: €74,100

Prix du Calvados
2025
My Highness	Fitzella	Nandita

Previous years
2024
Simmering	Fraise Des Bois	Iron Bird
2023
Les Pavots	Ornellaia	Laulne
2022
Wed	Sparkling Beauty	Never Ending Story
2021
Accakaba	Fleur D'Iris	Oscula

2020-2011
2020
Fev Rover	Plainchant	King's Harlequin
2019
Tropbeau	Marieta	Walk In Marrakesh
2018
Beyond Reason	Lagrandecatherine	Sicilia
2017
Polydream	Laurens	Bonita Fransisca
2016
Cavale Doree	Asidious Alexander	Baileys Showgirl
2015
Great Page	Marenko	Katie's Diamond
2014
Queen Bee	Calypso Beat	Sivoliere
2013
Sandiva	Straight Thinking	Stormyra
2012
Purr Along	Sara Lucille	Premier Steps
2011
Elusive Kate	Mashoora	Switcher

2010–2001
2010
Mambia	Miss Fifty	Fork Handles
2009
Joanna	Virginia Hall	American Nizzy
2008
Elusive Wave	Ana Americana	Queen America
2007
Proviso	Laureldean Gale	Lady Deauville
2006
Charlotte O Fraise	Poltava	Mpumalanga
2005
Confidential Lady	Quiet Royal	Queensalsa
2004
Cours De La Reine	Royal Copenhagen	Gorella
2003
Green Swallow	Via Milano	Leila
2002
Six Perfections	Londonnetdotcom	The Wise Lady
2001
Ya Hajar	Lady High Havens	Bashful

2000–1990
2000
Ascension	Wooden Doll	Peaceful Paradise
1999
Lady Vettori	Cap Coz	Guthrun
1998
Kareymah	Stella Berine	Tycoon's Dolce
1997
Woodland Melody	Sainte Marine	Seralia
1996
Shigeru Summit	Dame D'Harvard	Green Lady
1995
Blushing Gleam	Like A Hawk	Wedding Gift
1994
Fairy Path	Queen's Gallery	Malafemmena
1993
Far Mist	Cherokee Rose	Blue Burgee
1992
Cox Orange	Rouquette	Sissingaya
1991
Verveine	Stormagain	Guislaine
1990
Green Pola	Magic Night	Danzante

The Prix du Calvados is a Group 2 flat horse race in France open to two-year-old thoroughbred fillies. It is run at Deauville over a distance of 1,400 metres (about 7 furlongs) and it is scheduled to take place each year in August.

== History ==
The event is named after Calvados, the department in which Deauville is located. It was established in 1970, and it was initially contested over 1,300 metres. It was extended to 1,400 metres and given Group 3 status in 1977.

The Prix du Calvados is currently the first Group race of the year in France exclusively for two-year-old fillies. It was sponsored by PMU since 2013 and by Longines from 2014 to 2016. The race was upgraded from Group 3 to Group 2 in 2018.

== Records ==
Leading jockey (3 wins):

- Yves Saint-Martin – Theia (1975), Lady Jane Grey (1977), Rayonnante (1985)
- Freddy Head – Maximova (1982), Savannah's Honor (1987), Fairy Path (1994)
- Christophe Soumillon - Cours de la Reine (2004), Great Page (2015), Fev Rover (2020)

Leading trainer (4 wins):

- François Boutin – Joberane (1973), Bernica (1980), Whakilyric (1986), Savannah's Honor (1987)
- André Fabre – Cox Orange (1992), Proviso (2007), Tropbeau (2019), My Highness (2025)

Leading owner (3 wins):

- Sir Michael Sobell – Waterway (1978), Helen Street (1984), Arousal (1989)

== Winners since 1975 ==
Year	Winner	Jockey	Trainer	Owner	Time
1975	Theia	Yves Saint-Martin	Raymond Touflan	Baronne de Lopez-Taragoya
1976	Virgin		John Cunnington
1977	Lady Jane Grey	Yves Saint-Martin	M Clement	C Thieriot	1:26.8
1978	Waterway	Alfred Gibert	Aage Paus	Michael Sobell	1:25.7
1979	Zolinana	Fabrice Pegurri	Jean Laumain	Hubert Seutet	1:28.6
1980	Bernica	Philippe Paquet	François Boutin	Jean Ternynck	1:24.7
1981	Exclusive Order	Dominique Vincent	John Cunnington Jr.	Paul de Moussac
1982	Maximova	Freddy Head	Criquette Head	Haras d'Etreham
1983	Almeira	Dominique Vincent	J. C. Cunnington	Countess Batthyany	1:24.0
1984	Helen Street	Willie Carson	Dick Hern	Sir Michael Sobell	1:22.9
1985	Rayonnante	Yves Saint-Martin	Robert Collet	Mrs Daniel Bertrand	1:30.7
1986	Whakilyric	Eric Saint-Martin	François Boutin	Stavros Niarchos	1:29.2
1987	Savannah's Honor	Freddy Head	François Boutin	Allen Paulson	1:30.4
1988	Oczy Czarnie	Tony Cruz	Jean-Marie Béguigné	Edouard E. de Rothschild	1:24.9
1989	Arousal	Willie Carson	Dick Hern	Sir Michael Sobell	1:30.4
1990	Green Pola	William Mongil	Georges Mikhalidès	Alan Clore	1:27.6
1991	Verveine	Dominique Boeuf	Élie Lellouche	Daniel Wildenstein	1:25.3
1992	Cox Orange	Steve Cauthen	André Fabre	Sheikh Mohammed	1:30.0
1993	Far Mist	Gérald Mossé	Francesco Flachi	Jean-Pierre Lore	1:25.3
1994	Fairy Path	Freddy Head	David Smaga	Lord Weinstock	1:28.1
1995	Blushing Gleam	Olivier Doleuze	Criquette Head	Jacques Wertheimer	1:28.3
1996	Shigeru Summit	Mathieu Boutin	Cédric Boutin	Ryoki Tanaka	1:25.9
1997	Woodland Melody	Olivier Peslier	Peter Chapple-Hyam	Robert Sangster	1:27.3
1998	Kareymah	Frankie Dettori	David Loder	Ahmed Al Maktoum	1:26.7
1999	Lady Vettori	Thierry Gillet	François Rohaut	Andrew Crichton
2000	Ascension	Cash Asmussen	Mick Channon	Norman Cheng	1:25.3
2001	Ya Hajar	Steve Drowne	Mick Channon	Jaber Abdullah	1:23.7
2002	Six Perfections	Thierry Thulliez	Pascal Bary	Niarchos Family	1:24.3
2003	Green Swallow	Thierry Gillet	Philippe Demercastel	John Amerman	1:27.1
2004	Cours de la Reine	Christophe Soumillon	Peter Chapple-Hyam	Classic St Gatien P'ship	1:32.3
2005	Confidential Lady	Jean-Bernard Eyquem	Sir Mark Prescott	Cheveley Park Stud	1:28.3
2006	Charlotte O Fraise	Christophe Lemaire	Rod Collet	Paul Vidal	1:30.5
2007	Proviso	Stéphane Pasquier	André Fabre	Khalid Abdullah	1:21.1
2008	Elusive Wave	Christophe Lemaire	Jean-Claude Rouget	Marc de Chambure	1:26.2
2009	Joanna	Dario Vargiu	Bruno Grizzetti	Allevamento dei Sette	1:22.1
2010	Mambia	Davy Bonilla	Joel Boisnard	Raymond Luce	1:24.0
2011	Elusive Kate	Olivier Peslier	John Gosden	Magnolia Racing / Hood	1:25.6
2012	Purr Along	Umberto Rispoli	William Muir	Muir Racing Prtnshp – Manchester	1:24.9
2013	Sandiva	Frankie Dettori	Richard Fahey	Joaan Bin Hamad Al Thani	1:22.27
2014	Queen Bee	Gregory Benoist	Élie Lellouche	G Augustin-Normand & Ecurie La Boetie	1:29.21
2015	Great Page	Christophe Soumillon	Richard Hannon Jr.	Middleham Park Racing LXXVIII	1:23.17
2016	Cavale Doree	Julien Auge	Christophe Ferland	Ecurie Mill Reef Sas	1:25.31
2017	Polydream	Maxime Guyon	Freddy Head	Wertheimer et Frère	1:23.21
2018	Beyond Reason	William Buick	Charlie Appleby	Godolphin	1:26.57
2019	Tropbeau	Mickael Barzalona	André Fabre	Lady Bamford	1:24.10
2020	Fev Rover	Christophe Soumillon	Richard Fahey	Nick Bradley Racing 43 & Partner	1:27.53
2021	Accakaba	Maxime Guyon	Christophe Ferland	Wertheimer et Frère	1:24.73
2022	Wed	Cristian Demuro	Maurizio Guarnieri	Mohamed Saeed Al Shahi	1:23.94
2023	Les Pavots	Mickael Barzalona	Francis-Henri Graffard	Haras D'Etreham & Craig Bernick	1:27.07
2024	Simmering	Dylan Browne McMonagle	Ollie Sangster	Al Shaqab Racing	1:25.84
2025	My Highness	Cristian Demuro	André Fabre	Godolphin	1:20.73
2026	Woot Woot	Christophe Soumillon	Christopher Head	LNJ Foxwoods	1:24.23

== Earlier winners ==
- 1972: Fiery Diplomat
- 1973: Joberane
- 1974: Margravine

== See also ==
- List of French flat horse races
