= John Hills (racehorse trainer) =

British horse trainer

- Born: John William Hills; October 1960; Newmarket, Cambridgeshire, England
- Died: 1 June 2014 (aged 53); Hungerford, Berkshire, England
- Occupation: Racehorse trainer
- Years active: 1985–2014
- Spouse: Fiona Cole (m. 1987)
- Children: 4
- Father: Barry Hills
- Relatives: Michael Hills (brother); Richard Hills (brother)

John William Hills (October 1960 – 1 June 2014) was an English racehorse trainer specializing in flat racing.

== Early life ==
Hills was the son of Classic-winning thoroughbred trainer Barry Hills and brother of jockeys Michael Hills and Richard Hills.

== Career ==
Hills began as an amateur jockey, riding the winners of 21 races, and worked for trainers Harry Thomson Jones, Edward O'Grady and John Gosden. He also worked for his father, Barry, and became a trainer himself in 1987. During his career, Hills trained around 700 winners.

== Personal life ==
Hills married Fiona Caroline Cole in Newbury, Berkshire, in August 1987. They had four daughters together: Jessica Emily Hills (born 1989), Olivia Rorie Hills (born 1991), Martha Eliza Hills (born 1995), and Isabella Catherine Hills (born 1997).

Hills died in Hungerford, Berkshire, on 1 June 2014, at the age of 53. He had been suffering from cancer of the pancreas.

== Major wins ==
Germany

- Aral-Pokal – Wind In Her Hair (1995)
