= David Thompson (British businessman) =

British businessman (1936-2020)

David Thompson CBE
- Born: David Brian Thompson; 4 April 1936
- Died: 29 December 2020 (aged 84)
- Occupations: Businessman, investor, racehorse owner
- Known for: Co-founder of Hillsdown Foods
- Spouse: Patricia Thompson
- Family: Richard Thompson (son)

David Brian Thompson CBE (4 April 1936 – 29 December 2020) was the co-founder of Hillsdown Holdings, one of the United Kingdom's largest food businesses.

== Career ==
Having initially worked as a meat trader at Smithfield Market, David Thompson helped his father to float his meat wholesaling business in 1966. He co-founded Hillsdown Holdings in 1975 and then, in 1989, sold his stake in the business for £500m.

He acquired the Cheveley Park Stud near Newmarket: famous horses coming from Cheveley include Party Politics, the 1992 Grand National winner, owned by Patricia, his wife. He was also an investor in Queens Park Rangers Football Club. David Thompson lived in north London.

== Family ==
David Thompson was married to Patricia Thompson and together they had one son, Richard Thompson, and two daughters.

Together with his wife, Thompson was appointed Commander of the Order of the British Empire (CBE) in the 2020 Birthday Honours for services to charity.
