= Prix Jacques Le Marois =

Flat horse race in France

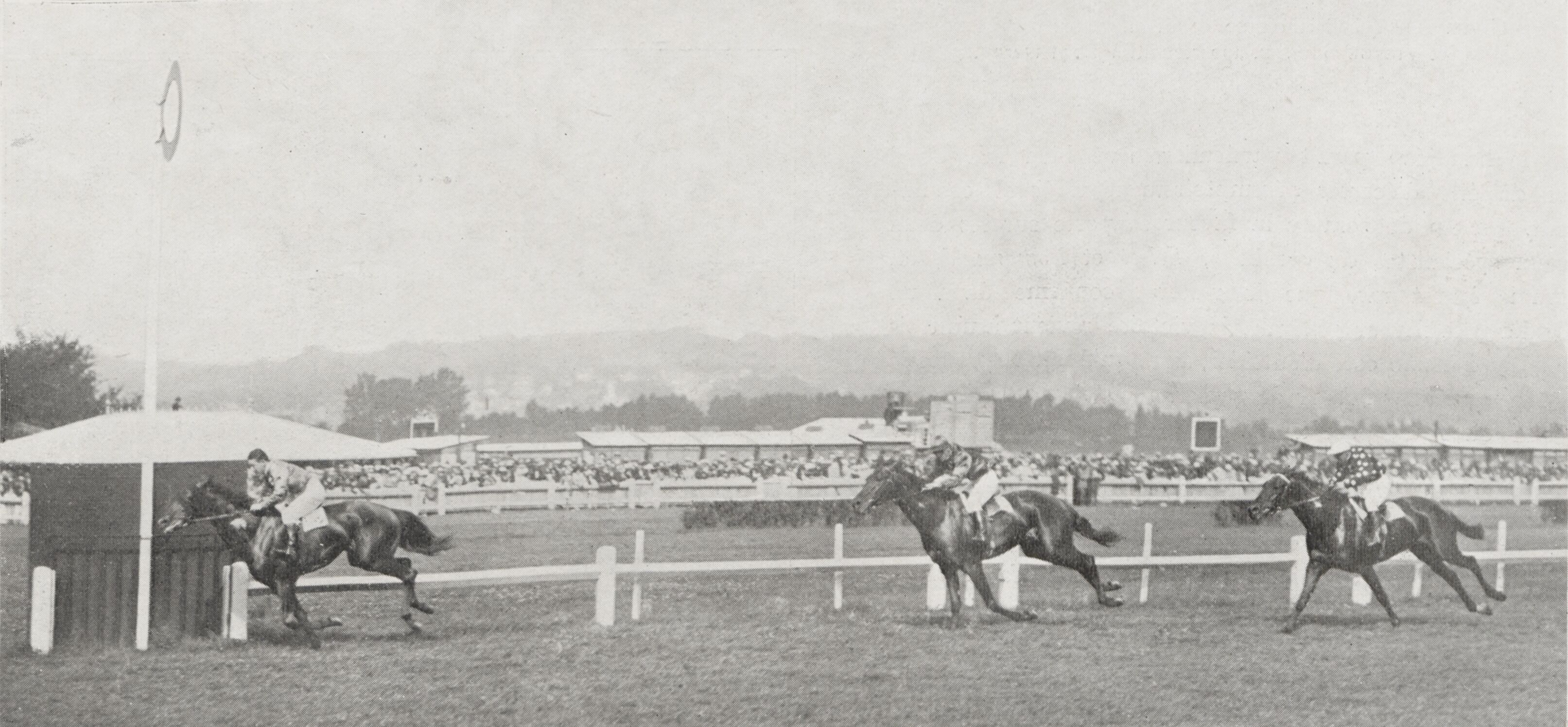
- 1923 winner, Sir Gallahad.
- Class: Group 1
- Location: Deauville Racecourse; Deauville, France
- Inaugurated: 1921
- Race type: Flat / Thoroughbred
- Sponsor: Aga Khan Stud
- Website: france-galop.com

Race information
- Distance: 1,600 metres (1 mile)
- Surface: Turf
- Track: Straight
- Qualification: Three-years-old and up excluding geldings
- Weight: 56½ kg (3yo); 59½ kg (4yo+); Allowances; 1½ kg for fillies and mares
- Purse: €1,000,000 (2022); 1st: €571,400

Prix Jacques Le Marois
2026
Rayif	Zeus Olympios	Precise

Previous years
2025
Diego Velazquez	Notable Speech	Dancing Gemini
2024
Charyn	Metropolitan	Inspiral
2023
Inspiral	Big Rock	Light Infantry
2022
Inspiral	Light Infantry	Erevann
2021
Palace Pier	Poetic Flare	Order Of Australia

2020-2011
2020
Palace Pier	Alpine Star	Circus Maximus
2019
Romanised	Shaman	Line of Duty
2018
Alpha Centauri	Recoletos	With You
2017
Al Wukair	Inns Of Court	Thunder Snow
2016
Ribchester	Vadamos	Ervedya
2015
Esoterique	Territories	Wild Chief
2014
Kingman	Anodin	Olympic Glory
2013
Moonlight Cloud	Olympic Glory	Intello
2012
Excelebration	Cityscape	Elusive Kate
2011
Immortal Verse	Goldikova	Sahpresa

2010–2001
2010
Makfi	Goldikova	Paco Boy
2009
Goldikova	Aqlaam	Virtual
2008
Tamayuz	Natagora	Major Cadeaux
2007
Manduro	Holocene	Turtle Bowl
2006
Librettist	Manduro	Peeress
2005
Dubawi	Whipper	Valixir
2004
Whipper	Six Perfections	My Risk
2003
Six Perfections	Domedriver	Telegnosis
2002
Banks Hill	Domedriver	Best Of The Bests
2001
Vahorimix	Banks Hill	Noverre

2000–1991
2000
Muhtathir	Sendawar	Kingsalsa
1999
Dubai Millennium	Slickly	Dansili
1998
Taiki Shuttle	Among Men	Cape Cross
1997
Spinning World	Daylami	Neuilly
1996
Spinning World	Vetheuil	Shaanxi
1995
Miss Satamixa	Sayyedati	Shaanxi
1994
East Of The Moon	Sayyedati	Mehthaaf
1993
Sayyedati	Ski Paradise	Kingmambo
1992
Exit To Nowhere	Lahib	Cardoun
1991
Hector Protector	Lycius	Danseuse Du Soir

1990–1988
1990
Priolo	Linamix	Distant Relative
1989
Polish Precedent	French Stress	Magic Gleam
1988
Miesque	Warning	Gabina
1987
Miesque	Nashmeel	Hadeer

The Prix Jacques Le Marois is a Group 1 flat horse race in France open to thoroughbred colts and fillies aged three years or older. It is run in August each year at Deauville over a distance of 1,600 metres (about 1 mile).

== History ==
The event is named in memory of Jacques Le Marois (1865–1920), a president of the venue's former governing body, the Société des Courses de Deauville. It was established in 1921, and was originally restricted to three-year-olds.

Deauville Racecourse was closed during World War II, and the Prix Jacques Le Marois was cancelled in 1940. For the remainder of this period it was switched between Maisons-Laffitte (1941–43, 1945) and Longchamp (1944). It returned to Deauville in 1946, and was opened to horses aged four or older in 1952.

The Fresnay-le-Buffard stud farm became the sponsor of the Prix Jacques Le Marois in 1986. From this point the event was known as the Prix du Haras de Fresnay-le-Buffard-Jacques Le Marois.

The race was added to the Breeders' Cup Challenge series in 2010. The winner now earns an invitation to compete in the same year's Breeders' Cup Mile.

== Records ==
Most successful horse (2 wins):

- Miesque – 1987, 1988
- Spinning World – 1996, 1997
- Palace Pier – 2020, 2021
- Inspiral - 2022, 2023

Leading jockey (8 wins):

- Frankie Dettori – Dubai Millennium (1999), Muhtathir (2000), Librettist (2006), Al Wukair (2017), Palace Pier (2020, 2021), Inspiral (2022, 2023)

Leading trainer (7 wins):

- François Boutin – Nonoalco (1974), Miesque (1987, 1988), Priolo (1990), Hector Protector (1991), Exit to Nowhere (1992), East of the Moon (1994)
- André Fabre – Polish Precedent (1989), Miss Satamixa (1995), Vahorimix (2001), Banks Hill (2002), Manduro (2007), Esoterique (2015), Al Wukair (2017)

Leading owner (10 wins):

- Marcel Boussac – Zariba (1922), Xander (1928), Cillas (1938), Semiramide (1939), Priam (1944), Coaraze (1945), Djelal (1947), Golestan (1948), Arbele (1952), Canthare (1953)

== Winners since 1972 ==
Year	Winner	Age	Jockey	Trainer	Owner	Time
1972	Lyphard	3	Freddy Head	Alec Head	Germaine Wertheimer	1:38.20
1973	Kalamoun	3	Henri Samani	François Mathet	Aga Khan IV	1:36.00
1974	Nonoalco	3	Lester Piggott	François Boutin	María Félix Berger	1:37.20
1975	Lianga	4	Yves Saint-Martin	Angel Penna	Daniel Wildenstein	1:34.60
1976	Gravelines	4	Gary W. Moore	Angel Penna	Daniel Wildenstein	1:35.10
1977	Flying Water	4	Yves Saint-Martin	Angel Penna	Daniel Wildenstein	1:44.20
1978	Kenmare	3	Alain Badel	François Mathet	Guy de Rothschild	1:38.60
1979	Irish River	3	Maurice Philipperon	John Cunnington Jr.	Mrs Raymond Adès	1:35.40
1980	Nadjar	4	Alain Lequeux	Aage Paus	A. D. D. Rogers	1:38.40
1981	Northjet	4	Freddy Head	Olivier Douieb	Serge Fradkoff	1:34.50
1982	The Wonder	4	Pat Eddery	Jacques de Chevigny	Marquesa de Moratalla	1:35.50
1983	Luth Enchantee	3	Maurice Philipperon	John Cunnington Jr.	Paul de Moussac	1:35.90
1984	Lear Fan	3	Pat Eddery	Guy Harwood	Ahmed bin Salman	1:34.90
1985	Vin de France	3	Éric Legrix	Patrick Biancone	Daniel Wildenstein	1:38.20
1986	Lirung	4	Steve Cauthen	Heinz Jentzsch	Gestüt Fährhof	1:36.40
1987	Miesque	3	Freddy Head	François Boutin	Stavros Niarchos	1:36.00
1988	Miesque	4	Freddy Head	François Boutin	Stavros Niarchos	1:38.60
1989	Polish Precedent	3	Cash Asmussen	André Fabre	Sheikh Mohammed	1:37.30
1990	Priolo	3	Alain Lequeux	François Boutin	Ecurie Skymarc Farm	1:38.20
1991	Hector Protector	3	Freddy Head	François Boutin	Stavros Niarchos	1:39.40
1992	Exit to Nowhere	4	Cash Asmussen	François Boutin	Stavros Niarchos	1:40.80
1993	Sayyedati	3	Walter Swinburn	Clive Brittain	Mohamed Obaida	1:39.80
1994	East of the Moon	3	Cash Asmussen	François Boutin	Stavros Niarchos	1:35.70
1995	Miss Satamixa	3	Sylvain Guillot	André Fabre	Jean-Luc Lagardère	1:35.70
1996	Spinning World	3	Cash Asmussen	Jonathan Pease	Niarchos Family	1:39.10
1997	Spinning World	4	Cash Asmussen	Jonathan Pease	Niarchos Family	1:34.40
1998	Taiki Shuttle	4	Yukio Okabe	Kazuo Fujisawa	Taiki Farm	1:37.40
1999	Dubai Millennium	3	Frankie Dettori	Saeed bin Suroor	Godolphin	1:44.30
2000	Muhtathir	5	Frankie Dettori	Saeed bin Suroor	Godolphin	1:34.60
2001	Vahorimix (Note: Proudwings finished first in 2001, but she was relegated to last place following a stewards' inquiry)	3	Olivier Peslier	André Fabre	Jean-Luc Lagardère	1:38.80
2002	Banks Hill	4	Olivier Peslier	André Fabre	Khalid Abdullah	1:35.00
2003	Six Perfections	3	Thierry Thulliez	Pascal Bary	Niarchos Family	1:38.30
2004	Whipper	3	Christophe Soumillon	Robert Collet	Richard Strauss	1:38.40
2005	Dubawi	3	Kerrin McEvoy	Saeed bin Suroor	Godolphin	1:37.90
2006	Librettist	4	Frankie Dettori	Saeed bin Suroor	Godolphin	1:43.10
2007	Manduro	5	Stéphane Pasquier	André Fabre	Georg von Ullmann	1:37.40
2008	Tamayuz	3	Davy Bonilla	Freddy Head	Hamdan Al Maktoum	1:36.40
2009	Goldikova	4	Olivier Peslier	Freddy Head	Wertheimer et Frère	1:33.50
2010	Makfi	3	Christophe Soumillon	Mikel Delzangles	Mathieu Offenstadt	1:39.40
2011	Immortal Verse	3	Gérald Mossé	Robert Collet	Richard Strauss	1:38.30
2012	Excelebration	4	Christophe Soumillon	Aidan O'Brien	Smith / Magnier / Tabor	1:34.60
2013	Moonlight Cloud	5	Thierry Jarnet	Freddy Head	George Strawbridge Jr.	1:33.39
2014	Kingman	3	James Doyle	John Gosden	Khalid Abdullah	1:41.90
2015	Esoterique	5	Pierre-Charles Boudot	André Fabre	Édouard de Rothschild	1:36.12
2016	Ribchester	3	William Buick	Richard Fahey	Godolphin	1:36.16
2017	Al Wukair	3	Frankie Dettori	André Fabre	Al Shaqab Racing	1:38.51
2018	Alpha Centauri	3	Colm O'Donoghue	Jessica Harrington	Niarchos family	1:34.27
2019	Romanised	3	Billy Lee	Ken Condon	Robert Ng	1:35.16
2020	Palace Pier	3	Frankie Dettori	John Gosden	Hamdan bin Mohammed Al Maktoum	1:38.06
2021	Palace Pier	4	Frankie Dettori	John & Thady Gosden	Hamdan bin Mohammed Al Maktoum	1:35.96
2022	Inspiral	3	Frankie Dettori	John & Thady Gosden	Cheveley Park Stud	1:34.07
2023	Inspiral	4	Frankie Dettori	John & Thady Gosden	Cheveley Park Stud	1:36.62
2024	Charyn	4	Silvestre De Sousa	Roger Varian	Nurlan Bizakov	1:33.98
2025	Diego Velazquez	4	Christophe Soumillon	Aidan O'Brien	Sam Sangster Bloodstock	1:34.23
2026	Rayif	3	Mickael Barzalona	Francis-Henri Graffard	Aga Khan Studs SCEA	1:35.50

== Earlier winners ==
- 1921: Guerriere
- 1922: Zariba
- 1923: Sir Gallahad
- 1924: Ivain
- 1925: Coram
- 1926: Saint Fortunat
- 1927: Vitamine
- 1928: Xander
- 1929: Slipper
- 1930: Pontet Canet
- 1931: Pearl Cap
- 1932: Henin
- 1933: Arpette
- 1934: Shining Tor
- 1935: Aromate
- 1936: King Kong
- 1937: En Fraude
- 1938: Cillas
- 1939: Semiramide
- 1940: no race
- 1941: Princesse Palatine
- 1942: Fine Art
- 1943: Dogat
- 1944: Priam
- 1945: Coaraze
- 1946: Sayani
- 1947: Djelal
- 1948: Golestan
- 1949: Amour Drake
- 1950: Fort Napoleon
- 1951: Seigneur
- 1952: Arbele
- 1953: Canthare
- 1954: Ti Moun
- 1955: Klairon
- 1956: Buisson Ardent
- 1957: Balbo
- 1958: Coup de Canon
- 1959: Sallymount
- 1960: Djebel Traffic
- 1961: Net
- 1962: Lebon M L
- 1963: Hula Dancer
- 1964: La Bamba
- 1965: Astaria
- 1966: The Marshal
- 1967: Carabella
- 1968: Luthier
- 1969: Gris Vitesse
- 1970: Priamos
- 1971: Dictus

== See also ==
- List of French flat horse races
