= Prestige Stakes =

Flat horse race in Britain

- Class: Group 3
- Location: Goodwood Racecourse; W. Sussex, England
- Inaugurated: 1974
- Race type: Flat
- Sponsor: William Hill
- Website: Goodwood

Race information
- Distance: 7f (1,408 metres)
- Surface: Turf
- Track: Right-handed
- Qualification: Two-year-old fillies
- Weight: 9 st 2 lb Penalties; 5 lb for G1 / G2 winners 3 lb for G3 winners
- Purse: £60,000 (2022); 1st: £34,026

Prestige Stakes
2026
Light Of Dawn	Eabha	Coaxed

Previous years
2025
Precise	Moon Target	Aylin
2024
Anshoda	Duty First	Merrily
2023
Darnation	Carla's Way	Hard To Resist
2022
Fairy Cross	Breege	Bright Diamond
2021
Mise En Scene	Daneh	Prosperous Voyage

2020-2011
2020
Isabella Giles	Prado	Seattle Rock
2019
Boomer	Dark Lady	Shadn
2018
Antonia De Vega	Accordance	Chynna
2017
Billesdon Brook	Whitefountainfairy	Miss Bar Beach
2016
Kilmah	Promising	Urban Fox
2015
Hawksmoor	Fireglow	Light Up Our World
2014
Malabar	Bonnie Grey	Zifena
2013
Amazing Maria	Qawaasem	Halljoy
2012
Ollie Olga	Sky Lantern	Amazonas
2011
Regal Realm	Rakasa	Questing

2010-2001
2010
Theyskens' Theory	Cochabamba	Cape Dollar
2009
Sent From Heaven	Mudaaraah	Snow Fairy
2008
Fantasia	Rose Diamond	April Pride
2007
Sense Of Joy	Celtic Slipper	Eva's Request
2006
Sesmen	Bicoastal	Cumin
2005
Nannina	Rising Cross	Mixed Blessing
2004
Dubai Surprise	Nanabanana	Red Peony
2003
Gracefully	Ithaca	Dubaian Duel
2002
Geminiani	Mail The Desert	Huja
2001
Gossamer	Protectorate	Kootenay

2000-1991
2000
Freefourracing	Summer Symphony	Waki Music
1999
Icicle	Croeso Cariad	Goodwood Blizzard
1998
Circle Of Gold	Choirgirl	Al Fahda
1997
Midnight Line	Alignment	Elshamms
1996
Red Camellia	Fernanda	Velour
1995
Bint Shadayid	Papering	Fag End
1994
Pure Grain	Poppy Carew	Tajannub
1993
Glatisant	Wild Planet	Spot Prize
1992
Love Of Silver	Dancing Bloom	Ajfan
1991
Musicale	Mesaafi	Super Sarena

1990-1988
1990
Jaffa Line	Ausherra	Atlantic Flyer
1989
Moon Cactus	Arpero	Native Guile
1988
Life At The Top	Priceless Pearl	Didicoy

The Prestige Stakes is a Group 3 flat horse race in Great Britain open to two-year-old fillies. It is run at Goodwood over a distance of 7 furlongs (1,408 metres), and it is scheduled to take place each year in late August.

== History ==
The event was established in 1974, and it was initially called the Globtik Stakes. It became known as the Waterford Candelabra Stakes in 1975. For a period it was classed at Listed level, and it was promoted to Group 3 status in 1981. It was given its present title in 1989.

The leading horses from the Prestige Stakes often go on to compete in the Fillies' Mile. The last to win both was Nannina in 2005.

== Records ==
Leading jockey (4 wins):

- Pat Eddery — One Over Parr (1974), Fairy Footsteps (1980), Stratospheric (1981), Musicale (1991)

Leading trainer (6 wins):

- Sir Henry Cecil — Cappuccilli (1975), Formulate (1978), Fairy Footsteps (1980), Moon Cactus (1989), Musicale (1991), Midnight Line (1997)

== Winners ==
Year	Winner	Jockey	Trainer	Time
1974	One Over Parr	Pat Eddery	Peter Walwyn	1:30.99
1975	Cappuccilli	Lester Piggott	Henry Cecil	1:32.41
1976	Triple First	Greville Starkey	Michael Stoute	1:28.72
1977	Cistus	Willie Carson	Dick Hern	1:32.15
1978	Formulate	Michael Roberts	Henry Cecil	1:28.78
1979 ^{[a]}	Schweppes Forever	Brian Taylor	Ryan Price	1:31.58
1980	Fairy Footsteps	Pat Eddery	Henry Cecil	1:27.79
1981	Stratospheric	Pat Eddery	John Dunlop	1:29.37
1982	Flamenco	John Matthias	Ian Balding	1:28.10
1983	Shoot Clear	Walter Swinburn	Michael Stoute	1:28.67
1984	Bella Colora	Walter Swinburn	Michael Stoute	1:27.73
1985	Asteroid Field	Brent Thomson	Barry Hills	1:33.36
1986	Invited Guest	Steve Cauthen	Robert Armstrong	1:30.47
1987	Obeah	Cash Asmussen	Barry Hills	1:28.81
1988	Life at the Top	Michael Roberts	Alec Stewart	1:28.00
1989	Moon Cactus	Steve Cauthen	Henry Cecil	1:27.64
1990	Jaffa Line	Steve Cauthen	David Elsworth	1:27.44
1991	Musicale	Pat Eddery	Henry Cecil	1:32.56
1992	Love of Silver	Michael Roberts	Clive Brittain	1:32.14
1993	Glatisant	Michael Hills	Geoff Wragg	1:26.14
1994	Pure Grain	John Reid	Michael Stoute	1:27.92
1995	Bint Shadayid	Willie Carson	John Dunlop	1:26.27
1996	Red Camellia	George Duffield	Sir Mark Prescott	1:31.41
1997	Midnight Line	Willie Ryan	Henry Cecil	1:29.97
1998	Circle of Gold	John Reid	Peter Chapple-Hyam	1:27.71
1999	Icicle	Ray Cochrane	James Fanshawe	1:27.77
2000	Freefourracing	Richard Quinn	Brian Meehan	1:28.48
2001	Gossamer	Jamie Spencer	Luca Cumani	1:28.56
2002	Geminiani	Michael Hills	Barry Hills	1:26.75
2003	Gracefully	John Egan	Sylvester Kirk	1:27.26
2004	Dubai Surprise	Ryan Moore	David Loder	1:32.30
2005	Nannina	Jimmy Fortune	John Gosden	1:27.63
2006	Sesmen	Oscar Urbina	Marco Botti	1:25.76
2007	Sense of Joy	Richard Hughes	John Gosden	1:29.57
2008	Fantasia	Dane O'Neill	Luca Cumani	1:29.49
2009	Sent from Heaven	Robert Winston	Barry Hills	1:27.45
2010	Theyskens' Theory	Martin Dwyer	Brian Meehan	1:28.90
2011	Regal Realm	Jimmy Fortune	Jeremy Noseda	1:29.25
2012	Ollie Olga	Martin Harley	Mick Channon	1:28.53
2013	Amazing Maria	Gérald Mossé	Ed Dunlop	1:26.13
2014	Malabar	Richard Hughes	Mick Channon	1:26.98
2015	Hawksmoor	Harry Bentley	Hugo Palmer	1:28.63
2016	Kilmah	Franny Norton	Mark Johnston	1:27.08
2017	Billesdon Brook	Sean Levey	Richard Hannon Jr.	1:26.55
2018	Antonia De Vega	Harry Bentley	Ralph Beckett	1:27.58
2019	Boomer	Richard Kingscote	Tom Dascombe	1:26.49
2020	Isabella Giles	Adam Kirby	Clive Cox	1:29.58
2021	Mise En Scene	Oisin Murphy	James Ferguson	1:25.30
2022	Fairy Cross	William Buick	Charlie Appleby	1:30.84
2023	Darnation	Sam James	Karl Burke	1:32.71
2024	Anshoda	Billy Loughnane	David Loughnane	1:31.27
2025	Precise	Wayne Lordan	Aidan O'Brien	1:26.31
2026	Light Of Dawn	James Doyle	Karl Burke	1:29.45

^{a} The 1979 running took place at Ascot.

== See also ==
- Horse racing in Great Britain
- List of British flat horse races
- Recurring sporting events established in 1974 — this race is included under its original title, Globtik Stakes.
