= Micky Fenton (jockey) =

British jockey (born 1972)

Michael Fenton
Personal information
- Born: 18 January 1972 (age 54)
- Occupation: Jockey

Horse racing career
- Sport: Horse racing

Major racing wins
- Major races 1,000 Guineas Stakes (2006); Prix Royal Oak (2005); Oaks d'Italia (2001)

Significant horses
- Speciosa

Michael Fenton (born 18 January 1972) is a retired three-time Group 1 winning jockey.

He won the 2001 Oaks d'Italia on Zanzibar for Michael Bell and the 2005 Prix Royal Oak on Alcazar for Hughie Morrison, but his biggest victory was in May 2006 when he won the 1,000 Guineas on Speciosa.

== Statistics ==
Flat wins in Great Britain by year

Year	Wins	Runs	Strike rate	Total earnings
1993	14	182	8	£76,837
1994	39	408	10	£306,335
1995	51	537	9	£321,999
1996	42	521	8	£275,285
1997	34	392	9	£207,135
1998	38	447	9	£238,091
1999	55	552	10	£449,205
2000	50	612	8	£342,975
2001	63	846	7	£609,869
2002	76	793	10	£670,122
2003	55	758	7	£582,814
2004	60	709	8	£555,658
2005	53	812	7	£538,332
2006	56	906	6	£637,031
2007	65	793	8	£444,262
2008	67	727	9	£525,275
2009	47	538	9	£542,806
2010	27	421	6	£209,781
2011	25	385	6	£146,130
2012	24	363	7	£108,814
2013	15	240	6	£105,944

== Major wins ==
(United Kingdom) Great Britain

- 1,000 Guineas Stakes – Speciosa (2006)

France

- Prix Royal Oak – Alcazar (2005)

Italy

- Oaks d'Italia – Zanzibar (2001)
