= Sun Chariot Stakes =

Flat horse race in Britain

- Class: Group 1
- Location: Rowley Mile; Newmarket, England
- Inaugurated: 1966
- Race type: Flat / Thoroughbred
- Sponsor: BetMGM
- Website: Newmarket

Race information
- Distance: 1 mile (1,609 metres)
- Surface: Turf
- Track: Straight
- Qualification: Three-years-old and up fillies and mares
- Weight: 9 st 2 lb (3yo); 9 st 5 lb (4yo+)
- Purse: £275,000 (2025); 1st: £155,953

Sun Chariot Stakes
2026
Blue Bolt	Evolutionist	City Of Memphis

Previous years
2025
Fallen Angel	Blue Bolt	Cinderella's Dream
2024
Tamfana	Inspiral	See The Fire
2023
Inspiral	Mqse De Sevigne	Heredia
2022
Fonteyn	Laurel	Grande Dame
2021
Saffron Beach	Mother Earth	Dreamloper

2020-2011
2020
Nazeef	Half Light	Cloak Of Spirits
2019
Billesdon Brook	Veracious	Iridessa
2018
Laurens	Happily	Altyn Orda
2017
Roly Poly	Persuasive	Nathra
2016
Alice Springs	Always Smile	Ervedya
2015
Esoterique	Integral	Irish Rookie
2014
Integral	Miss France	Fintry
2013
Sky Lantern	Integral	Duntle
2012
Siyouma	Elusive Kate	Laugh Out Loud
2011
Sahpresa	Chachamaidee	Strawberrydaiquiri

2010-2001
2010
Sahpresa	Strawberrydaiquiri	Rainfall
2009
Sahpresa	Ghanaati	Spacious
2008
Halfway To Heaven	Darjina	Visit
2007
Majestic Roi	Nannina	Echelon
2006
Spinning Queen	Soviet Song	Alexander Goldrun
2005
Peeress	Summitville	Musicanna
2004
Attraction	Chic	Nebraska Tornado
2003
Echoes In Eternity	Macadamia	Almond Mousse
2002
Dress To Thrill	Dolores	Spinnette
2001
Independence	Foodbroker Fancy	Riberac

2000-1991
2000
Danceabout	Alshakr	May Ball
1999
Lady In Waiting	Gino's Spirits	All Our Hope
1998
Kissogram	Arriving	Digitalize
1997
One So Wonderful	Kool Kat Katie	Reams of Verse
1996
Last Second	Spout	Flame Valley
1995
Warning Shadows	Flagbird	Poppy Carew
1994
La Confederation	State Crystal	Relatively Special
1993
Talented	Andromaque	Felawnah
1992
Red Slippers	Feminine Wiles	Susurration
1991
Ristna	Dartrey	Third Watch

1990-1988
1990
Kartajana	Starlet	Filia Ardross
1989
Braiswick	Life At The Top	Pass The Peace
1988
Indian Skimmer	Infamy	Percy's Lass

The Sun Chariot Stakes is a Group 1 flat horse race in Great Britain open to fillies and mares aged three years or older. It is run on the Rowley Mile at Newmarket over a distance of 1 mile (1,609 metres), and it is scheduled to take place each year in early October.

== History ==
The event is named after Sun Chariot, the fillies' Triple Crown winner in 1942. Due to war, that year's Triple Crown races were all staged at Newmarket.

The Sun Chariot Stakes was established in 1966. It was originally contested by three-year-old fillies over 1 mile and 2 furlongs.

The present system of race grading was introduced in 1971, and the Sun Chariot Stakes was classed at Group 2 level. It was opened to older fillies and mares in 1974.

The race was cut to a mile in 2000, and promoted to Group 1 status in 2004.

The Sun Chariot Stakes was held on the final day of Newmarket's three-day Cambridgeshire Meeting, the same day as the Cambridgeshire Handicap, but was moved to a fixture a week later from 2014.

== Records ==
Most successful horse (3 wins):

- Sahpresa – 2009, 2010, 2011

Leading jockey (6 wins):

- Lester Piggott – Popkins (1970), Cheveley Princess (1973), Swiss Maid (1978), Topsy (1979), Snow (1980), Home on the Range (1981)

Leading trainer (6 wins):

- Luca Cumani – Free Guest (1984, 1985), Infamy (1987), Red Slippers (1992), One So Wonderful (1997), Kissogram (1998)

Leading owner (3 wins):

- Budgie Moller – Popkins (1970), Cheveley Princess (1973), Topsy (1979)
- Sheikh Mohammed – Indian Skimmer (1988), Red Slippers (1992), La Confederation (1994)
- Tabor / Smith / Magnier - Halfway To Heaven (2008), Alice Springs (2016), Roly Poly (2017)
- Cheveley Park Stud - Peeress (2005), Integral (2014), Inspiral (2023)

== Winners ==
Year	Winner	Age	Jockey	Trainer	Owner	Time
1966	Lucaya	3	Jimmy Lindley	Bill Elsey	David Aykroyd	2:12.14
1967	Cranberry Sauce	3	George Moore	Noel Murless	John Hornung	2:08.35
1968	Hill Shade	3	Sandy Barclay	Noel Murless	George Pope, Jr.	2:14.18
1969	Lucyrowe	3	Duncan Keith	Peter Walwyn	Louis Freedman	2:13.12
1970	Popkins	3	Lester Piggott	Harry Wragg	Budgie Moller	2:13.31
1971	Hill Circus	3	Geoff Lewis	Noel Murless	George Pope, Jr.	2:08.53
1972	Sleat	3	John Gorton	Bruce Hobbs	David Wills	2:12.54
1973	Cheveley Princess	3	Lester Piggott	Harry Wragg	Budgie Moller	2:15.30
1974	Sweet Farewell	3	Pat Eddery	Sir Hugh Nugent	C. Gaisford-St Lawrence	2:08.76
1975	Duboff	3	Willie Carson	Barry Hills	Mrs C. Radcliffe	2:04.03
1976	Ranimer	3	Alfred Gibert	Peter Head	Sir Robin McAlpine	2:08.50
1977	Triple First	3	Greville Starkey	Michael Stoute	Raymond Clifford-Turner	2:01.75
1978	Swiss Maid	3	Lester Piggott	Paul Kelleway	Max Fine	2:09.99
1979	Topsy	3	Lester Piggott	Harry Wragg	Budgie Moller	2:09.79
1980	Snow	3	Lester Piggott	Kevin Prendergast	M. Fraser	2:07.10
1981	Home on the Range	3	Lester Piggott	Henry Cecil	Louis Freedman	2:06.06
1982	Time Charter	3	Billy Newnes	Henry Candy	Robert Barnett	2:06.83
1983	Cormorant Wood	3	Steve Cauthen	Barry Hills	Bobby McAlpine	2:05.81
1984	Free Guest	3	Darrel McHargue	Luca Cumani	M. Boffa	2:06.59
1985	Free Guest	4	Pat Eddery	Luca Cumani	Fittocks Stud	2:01.97
1986	Dusty Dollar	3	Willie Carson	Dick Hern	Maktoum Al Maktoum	2:06.45
1987	Infamy	3	Ray Cochrane	Luca Cumani	Gerald Leigh	2:08.61
1988	Indian Skimmer	4	Michael Roberts	Henry Cecil	Sheikh Mohammed	2:05.44
1989	Braiswick	3	Gary Carter	Geoff Wragg	White Lodge Stud	2:05.79
1990	Kartajana	3	Walter Swinburn	Michael Stoute	HH Aga Khan IV	2:03.05
1991	Ristna	3	Willie Carson	John Gosden	George Strawbridge	2:03.47
1992	Red Slippers	3	Frankie Dettori	Luca Cumani	Sheikh Mohammed	2:08.01
1993	Talented	3	Willie Carson	John Dunlop	Peter Goulandris	2:09.61
1994	La Confederation	3	Kevin Darley	David Loder	Sheikh Mohammed	2:05.60
1995	Warning Shadows	3	Kevin Darley	Clive Brittain	Marwan Al Maktoum	2:04.91
1996	Last Second	3	George Duffield	Sir Mark Prescott	Faisal bin Salman	2:02.84
1997	One So Wonderful	3	John Reid	Luca Cumani	Helena Springfield Ltd	2:02.38
1998	Kissogram	3	John Reid	Luca Cumani	Helena Springfield Ltd	2:05.94
1999	Lady in Waiting	4	Jimmy Fortune	Paul Cole	Pegasus Racing Ltd	2:09.72
2000	Danceabout	3	Darryll Holland	Geoff Wragg	Bloomsbury Stud	1:38.79
2001	Independence	3	Kieren Fallon	Ed Dunlop	Cliveden Stud	1:38.79
2002	Dress to Thrill	3	Pat Smullen	Dermot Weld	Moyglare Stud Farm	1:35.67
2003	Echoes in Eternity	3	Jamie Spencer	Saeed bin Suroor	Godolphin	1:35.39
2004	Attraction	3	Kevin Darley	Mark Johnston	10th Duke of Roxburghe	1:36.27
2005	Peeress	4	Kevin Darley	Sir Michael Stoute	Cheveley Park Stud	1:38.81
2006	Spinning Queen	3	Michael Hills	Barry Hills	Marston / Cavendish	1:38.83
2007	Majestic Roi	3	Darryll Holland	Mick Channon	Jaber Abdullah	1:37.83
2008	Halfway to Heaven	3	Seamie Heffernan	Aidan O'Brien	Tabor / Smith / Magnier	1:35.41
2009	Sahpresa	4	Ted Durcan	Rod Collet	Douglas McIntyre	1:34.40
2010	Sahpresa	5	Christophe Soumillon	Rod Collet	Douglas McIntyre	1:38.80
2011	Sahpresa	6	Christophe Lemaire	Rod Collet	Teruya Yoshida	1:37.60
2012	Siyouma	4	Gérald Mossé	François Doumen	Robert Jeffcock	1:34.66
2013	Sky Lantern	3	Richard Hughes	Richard Hannon Sr.	Brian Keswick	1:38.02
2014	Integral	4	Ryan Moore	Sir Michael Stoute	Cheveley Park Stud	1:37.52
2015	Esoterique	5	Pierre-Charles Boudot	André Fabre	Édouard de Rothschild	1:35.87
2016	Alice Springs	3	Ryan Moore	Aidan O'Brien	Tabor / Smith / Magnier	1:37.46
2017	Roly Poly	3	Ryan Moore	Aidan O'Brien	Tabor / Smith / Magnier	1:34.88
2018	Laurens	3	Daniel Tudhope	Karl Burke	John Dance	1:37.94
2019	Billesdon Brook	4	Sean Levey	Richard Hannon Jr.	Pall Mall / McCreery	1:38.01
2020	Nazeef	4	Jim Crowley	John Gosden	Hamdan Al Maktoum	1:42.21
2021	Saffron Beach	3	William Buick	Jane Chapple-Hyam	Lucy Sangster & James Wigan	1:40.58
2022	Fonteyn	3	Neil Callan	Kevin Ryan	Sheikh Mohammed Obaid Al Maktoum	1:40.58
2023	Inspiral	4	Frankie Dettori	John & Thady Gosden	Cheveley Park Stud	1:35.65
2024	Tamfana	3	Colin Keane	David Menuisier	Quantum Leap Racing Viii & Friends	1:40.48
2025	Fallen Angel	4	James Doyle	Karl Burke	Wathnan Racing	1:33.31
2026	Blue Bolt	4	Colin Keane	Andrew Balding	Juddmonte	1:35.46

== See also ==
- Horse racing in Great Britain
- List of British flat horse races
