= Cheveley Park Stud =

UK racehorse ownership and breeding operation

Coordinates: 52.2237°N 0.4400°E

- Main entrance gates
- Industry: Horse breeding
- Headquarters: Newmarket, Suffolk, UK
- Key people: David Thompson and family (owners since 1975)
- Website: cheveleypark.co.uk

Cheveley Park Stud is a thoroughbred racehorse ownership and breeding operation in Newmarket, Suffolk, UK, which has bred and owned many notable horses. It is the oldest stud in Newmarket, the "capital" of British racing, with evidence of horse breeding on the site for over a thousand years, and became famous in the early nineteenth century.

== History and ownership ==
Racing colours of Cheveley Park Stud

Cheveley Park Stud is the oldest stud in Newmarket, with some buildings which were part of Cheveley Park house dating from the sixteenth century and with evidence that the site has been used for breeding horses since the reign of Æthelstan (924–939 CE). It became famous in the nineteenth century under the ownership of John Manners, 5th Duke of Rutland, was sold in 1892 to Harry McCalmont and again in 1921 by his family to the trainer Robert Sherwood.

On Sherwood's death in 1942 it was inherited by his secretary, Albert Stafford-Smith, whose son sold it in 1975 to David Thompson and his wife, Patricia. Their son Richard Thompson has taken an active interest in the Cheveley Park Stud farm over that time. The farm has owned horses such as Pivotal, Medicean, Russian Rhythm, Confidential Lady, Peeress and Nannina. Patricia Thompson was also the owner of the 1992 Grand National winner, Party Politics. David Thompson died on 29 December 2020 after a short illness.

The racing colours of the Cheveley Park Stud are red, with a white sash and a blue cap.

== Group 1 winners ==
Horses owned and/or bred by the Cheveley Park Stud that have won Group 1 races include:

- Cadland, winner of the 1828 Derby.
- Isinglass, winner of the Triple Crown in 1893.
- Gay Gallanta, winner of the Cheveley Park Stakes and European Champion Two-Year-Old Filly (1994)
- Pivotal, winner of the 1996 King's Stand Stakes and the Nunthorpe Stakes.
- Entrepreneur, winner of the 1997 2000 Guineas was bred at Cheveley Park Stud but owned by Michael Tabor and Susan Magnier].
- Medicean, winner of the 2001 Lockinge Stakes, Queen Anne Stakes and Eclipse Stakes
- Russian Rhythm, winner of the 2003 1000 Guineas, Coronation Stakes, Nassau Stakes and 2004 Lockinge Stakes.
- Peeress, winner of the 2005 Sun Chariot Stakes and the 2006 Lockinge Stakes
- Inspiral, winner of 2022 Coronation Stakes
