= Speciosa =

Irish-bred Thoroughbred racehorse

- Sire: Danehill Dancer
- Grandsire: Danehill
- Dam: Specifically
- Damsire: Sky Classic
- Sex: Mare
- Foaled: 28 April 2003
- Country: Ireland
- Colour: Bay
- Breeder: Kevin and Meta Cullen
- Owner: Pam Sly, Michael Sly, Tom Davies.
- Trainer: Pam Sly
- Record: 17: 4-3-2
- Earnings: £343,628

Major wins
- Rockfel Stakes (2005); Nell Gwyn Stakes (2006); 1000 Guineas (2006)

Speciosa (foaled 28 April 2003) is an Irish-bred, British-trained Thoroughbred racehorse. In a racing career which lasted from June 2005 and October 2007 she ran seventeen times and won four races. As a two-year-old, she won two of her six races including an upset win in the Group Two Rockfel Stakes at Newmarket Racecourse. As a three-year-old she won the Nell Gwyn Stakes and then took the Classic 1000 Guineas for her trainer and part owner Pam Sly. She failed to win in nine subsequent races although she placed second in the Earl of Sefton Stakes and the Pretty Polly Stakes. She was retired at the end of the 2007 season to become a broodmare. Her front-running style and unconventional background made her a popular Classic winner.

== Background ==
Speciosa, a bay horse with a white blaze and two white socks, was bred in Ireland by Kevin and Meta Cullen. She was large, heavily built mare, standing 16.2 hands high as a three-year-old. Her dam, Specifically, a daughter of the Canadian champion Sky Classic won one minor race and has produced several other winners including Major Rhythm, a gelding who won the Stars and Stripes Handicap in 2006. Specifically was closely related to Touching Wood, a colt finished second in The Derby and won the St Leger in 1982. Speciosa was sired by Danehill Dancer, a stallion whose progeny have won (as of 2012), more than 700 races and more than £13m in prize money.

In April 2005 the two-year-old Speciosa was offered for sale at Doncaster where she was bought for 30,000 guineas by Pam Sly. At the time, Sly trained fewer than twenty horses at her farm at Thorney, near Peterborough in Cambridgeshire. She was mainly known for training jumpers and until Speciosa arrived, she had never had a runner in a Group race. Pam Sly owned the filly in partnership with her son Michael and the London-based G. P. Tom Davies. Shortly after buying Speciosa, Sly engaged the County Limerick-born jockey Michael "Micky" Fenton to ride her in a training gallop. According to Fenton, who has been described as a "journeyman jockey", the filly "flew down the gallops" and he became her regular partner, riding her in fourteen of her seventeen races. Speciosa was a highly nervous and temperamental filly: in her early career she was treated with magnesium in an attempt to calm her temperament.

== Racing career ==
Speciosa began her career by running in maiden races at minor tracks in the summer of 2005. She finished second on her debut at Ripon in June, eighth at Nottingham in July and third at Leicester in August. She was successful at her fourth attempt, winning a maiden at Beverley Racecourse by a head despite veering to the left in the closing stages. Despite the modest standard of her form, Speciosa was then moved up in class to contest the Group Two May Hill Stakes at Doncaster in September. The 50/1 outsider of the eight runners, she took an early lead which she held until the final furlong before finishing third to Nasheej. Five weeks later, she started at odds of 20/1 in the Group Two Rockfel Stakes over seven furlongs at Newmarket. Fenton sent the filly to the front from the start, and she maintained her lead to the finish, winning by a neck from Violette with the future Sun Chariot Stakes winner Spinning Queen in sixth. During the winter of 2005/2006, Speciosa's owners turned down several large offers to buy the filly: Pam Sly was over-ruled by her partners after advising them to accept a £1,000,000 bid.

Speciosa began her three-year-old season in the Nell Gwyn Stakes a trial race for the 1000 Guineas run at Newmarket in April, in which, as a previous Group race winner, she carried a three pounds weight penalty. She led throughout the race and prevailed by a length from Spinning Queen, although she again showed a tendency to hang left inside the final furlong. Nineteen days later, Speciosa was the 10/1 fourth choice in the betting for the 1000 Guineas, behind Rumplestiltskin, Nannina and Flashy Wings. On Newmarket's wide Rowley Mile course, the field of thirteen runners split into two groups, with Speciosa taking the lead of the larger group racing nearest the stands. In the final quarter mile, many of the runners began to tire on the soft ground, but Speciosa stayed on under pressure, and although she yet again drifted to the left, she won by two lengths from Confidential Lady with Nasheej in third. Speciosa's victory was enthusiastically received by the Newmarket crowd, who gave the filly and her connections three cheers. Pam Sly described the win as being "for all the little people" and the success of a small stable was contrasted with those achieved by the major international racing organisations such as Coolmore/Ballydoyle and Godolphin.

Pam Sly paid a £20,000 supplementary fee to run Speciosa in The Oaks a month later, as the filly had not been one of the original entries for the mile and a half race. Starting at odds of 5/1, Speciosa led until the final quarter mile before being overtaken and finishing fourth to the Irish-trained filly Alexandrova. Her two remaining race results of 2006 were a ninth to Nasheej in the Coronation Stakes at Royal Ascot and a sixth in the Group Two Park Stakes at Doncaster in September.

Speciosa remained in training as a four-year-old but failed to win in six races. She began her season by racing against colts in the Earl of Sefton Stakes and produced a promising performance to finish second to the 2007 World Champion Manduro. Her only other placing came in June, when she was runner-up to Peeping Fawn in the Group One Pretty Polly Stakes. She finished unplaced in the Lockinge Stakes, the Nassau Stakes and the Sun Chariot Stakes, all Group One events. On her final appearance, she led for the first six furlongs of the Champion Stakes at Newmarket, before finishing seventh of the twelve runners behind Literato.

== Stud record ==
Speciosa's first foal, a colt by Oasis Dream Vermuyden, was foaled in March 2009. She was covered again by Oasis Dream in 2009, a filly foal Specialty, and was one of the first book of mares sent to Sea the Stars in 2010.

2009 Vermuyden (GB) : Bay gelding, foaled 16 March, by Oasis Dream (GB) – unplaced in 6 starts in England 2013–14

2010 Specialty (IRE) : Bay filly, foaled 1 April, by Oasis Dream (GB) – won twice and placed five times from 14 starts in England 2012–14

2011 Asteroidea (GB) : Bay filly, foaled 29 March, by Sea the Stars (IRE) – won once and placed three times from 6 starts in England 2013–14

2012 Sperrin (IRE) : Bay colt, foaled 9 April, by Dubawi (IRE) – placed fourth twice from 3 starts in England 2014–15

2013 Vernatti (GB) : Bay filly, foaled 23 April, by Teofilo (IRE) – won 2 races and placed once from five starts to date (31/05/17)

2014 Leveck (IRE) : Bay colt (gelded), foaled 28 April, by Dutch Art (GB) – unraced to date (31/05/17)

2015 Colt by Dark Angel (IRE) and to be rested. In 2016 visits Kyllachy (GB).

== Pedigree ==
Pedigree of Speciosa (IRE), bay filly, 2003
Sire Danehill Dancer (IRE) 1993	Danehill; 1986	Danzig	Northern Dancer
Sire Danehill Dancer (IRE) 1993	Danehill; 1986	Danzig	Pas de Nom
Sire Danehill Dancer (IRE) 1993	Danehill; 1986	Razvana	His Majesty
Sire Danehill Dancer (IRE) 1993	Danehill; 1986	Razvana	Spring Adieu
Sire Danehill Dancer (IRE) 1993	Mira Adonde; 1986	Sharpen Up	Atan
Sire Danehill Dancer (IRE) 1993	Mira Adonde; 1986	Sharpen Up	Rocchetta
Sire Danehill Dancer (IRE) 1993	Mira Adonde; 1986	Lettre D'Amour	Caro
Sire Danehill Dancer (IRE) 1993	Mira Adonde; 1986	Lettre D'Amour	Lianga
Dam Specifically (USA) 1994	Sky Classic; 1987	Nijinsky	Northern Dancer
Dam Specifically (USA) 1994	Sky Classic; 1987	Nijinsky	Flaming Page
Dam Specifically (USA) 1994	Sky Classic; 1987	No Class	Nodouble
Dam Specifically (USA) 1994	Sky Classic; 1987	No Class	Classy Quillo
Dam Specifically (USA) 1994	Specificity; 1988	Alleged	Hoist the Flag
Dam Specifically (USA) 1994	Specificity; 1988	Alleged	Princess Pout
Dam Specifically (USA) 1994	Specificity; 1988	Mandera	Vaguely Noble
Dam Specifically (USA) 1994	Specificity; 1988	Mandera	Foolish One (Family 8-d)

- Speciosa is inbred 4x4 to Northern Dancer, meaning that this stallion appears twice in the fourth generation of her pedigree.
