= Barry Hills =

British thoroughbred horse trainer (1937–2025)

- Born: Barrington William Hills; 2 April 1937; Worcester, Worcestershire, England
- Died: 27 June 2025 (aged 88)
- Occupation: Racehorse trainer
- Years active: 1955–2011 • 2014
- Spouses: Maureen Newson (m. 1959, divorced) Penny Woodhouse (m. 1977)
- Children: 5, including John, Michael and Richard

Barrington William Hills (2 April 1937 – 27 June 2025), known professionally as Barry Hills, was an English racehorse trainer.

== Career ==
In the mid-1950s, Barry Hills was an apprentice jockey to, among others, Fred Rimell. In 1959, he was the head lad of John Oxley. In 1969, he acquired a horse training licence and began training horses at South Bank Stables in Lambourn.

In 1986, he moved to Robert Sangster's Manton Yard where he remained until 1990, when he moved back to South Bank. By the end of 2000, he had trained 2166 winning horses in Britain. He trained his 3,000th winner, when Chapter And Verse won at Pontefract on 7 April 2009.

In 2009, he was presented with two Lifetime Achievement Awards at the Animal Health Trust Equine Awards and at the Derby Awards, both in London. He ended his training career on 22 August 2011. His son, Charles Hills, took over the licence.

When another son, John, died of cancer in 2014, Barry Hills was given a temporary licence to take over the running of the Kingwood House stable in Lambourn.

== Personal life and death ==
Hills married Maureen Anne Newson in Newmarket, Suffolk, in October 1959. They had three sons together: John William Hills (died 2014), a horse trainer, and twins Michael Patrick Hills and Richard James Hills, retired jockeys both of whom are still active in the horse racing industry. The couple later divorced. In July 1978, he married Penelope Elizabeth May 'Penny' Woodhouse in Rushcliffe, Nottinghamshire. They had two sons together, Charles Barrington Hills, a current trainer, and George William Hills, provides bloodstock insurance in Lexington, Kentucky, United States. He lived in Lambourn, Berkshire.

Hills died on 27 June 2025, at the age of 88.

== Major wins ==
Great Britain

- 1,000 Guineas – (2) – Enstone Spark (1978), Ghanaati (2009)
- 2,000 Guineas – (2) – Tap On Wood (1979), Haafhd (2004)
- Ascot Gold Cup – (2) – Gildoran (1984, 1985)
- Benson and Hedges Gold Cup – (2) – Hawaiian Sound (1978), Cormorant Wood (1984)
- Champion Stakes – (3) – Cormorant Wood (1983), Storming Home (2002), Haafhd (2004)
- Cheveley Park Stakes – (1) – Desirable (1983)
- Cork and Orrery Stakes – (1) – Royal Applause (1997)
- Coronation Stakes – (2) – Maids Causeway (2005), Ghanaati (2009)
- Dewhurst Stakes – (3) – Scenic (1988, dead-heat), In Command (1996), Distant Music (1999)
- Fillies' Mile – (1) – Silk Slippers (1989)
- Haydock Sprint Cup – (2) – Royal Applause (1997), Red Clubs (2007)
- King's Stand Stakes – (1) – Equiano (2010)
- Lockinge Stakes – (1) – Cormorant Wood (1984, dead-heat)
- Middle Park Stakes – (3) – Gallic League (1987), Royal Applause (1995), Dark Angel (2007)
- Nunthorpe Stakes – (2) – Handsome Sailor (1988), La Cucaracha (2005)
- Prince of Wales's Stakes – (1) – Kind of Hush (1982)
- Queen Elizabeth II Stakes – (1) – Sure Blade (1986)
- St. James's Palace Stakes – (1) – Sure Blade (1986)
- St Leger – (1) – Moonax (1994)
- Stayers' Hurdle – (1) – Nomadic Way (1992)
- Sun Chariot Stakes – (2) – Cormorant Wood (1983), Spinning Queen (2006)
- Sussex Stakes – (1) – Distant Relative (1990)
- Yorkshire Oaks – (1) – Dibidale (1974)

Austria

- Austrian Derby – (1) – Zimzalabim (1993)

France

- Grand Prix de Saint-Cloud – (2) – Rheingold (1972, 1973)
- Prix de l'Abbaye de Longchamp – (1) – Handsome Sailor (1988)
- Prix de l'Arc de Triomphe – (1) – Rheingold (1973)
- Prix Ganay – (1) – Rheingold (1973)
- Prix Jean Prat – (1) – Golden Snake (1999)
- Prix du Moulin de Longchamp – (1) – Distant Relative (1990)
- Prix Royal-Oak – (1) – Moonax (1994)
- Prix de la Salamandre – (1) – Our Mirage (1971)

Ireland

- Irish 1,000 Guineas – (2) – Nicer (1993), Hula Angel (1999)
- Irish Derby – (1) – Sir Harry Lewis (1987)
- Irish Oaks – (2) – Dibidale (1974), Bolas (1994)
- Matron Stakes – (1) – Pixie Erin (1987)
- National Stakes – (1) – Tap On Wood (1978)
- Pretty Polly Stakes – (1) – Lady Upstage (2000)

Italy

- Oaks d'Italia – (1) – Atoll (1990)
- Premio Regina Elena – (1) – Atoll (1990)

Slovakia

- Slovak Derby – (1) – Zimzalabim (1993)
