= Mark Prescott =

English horse trainer

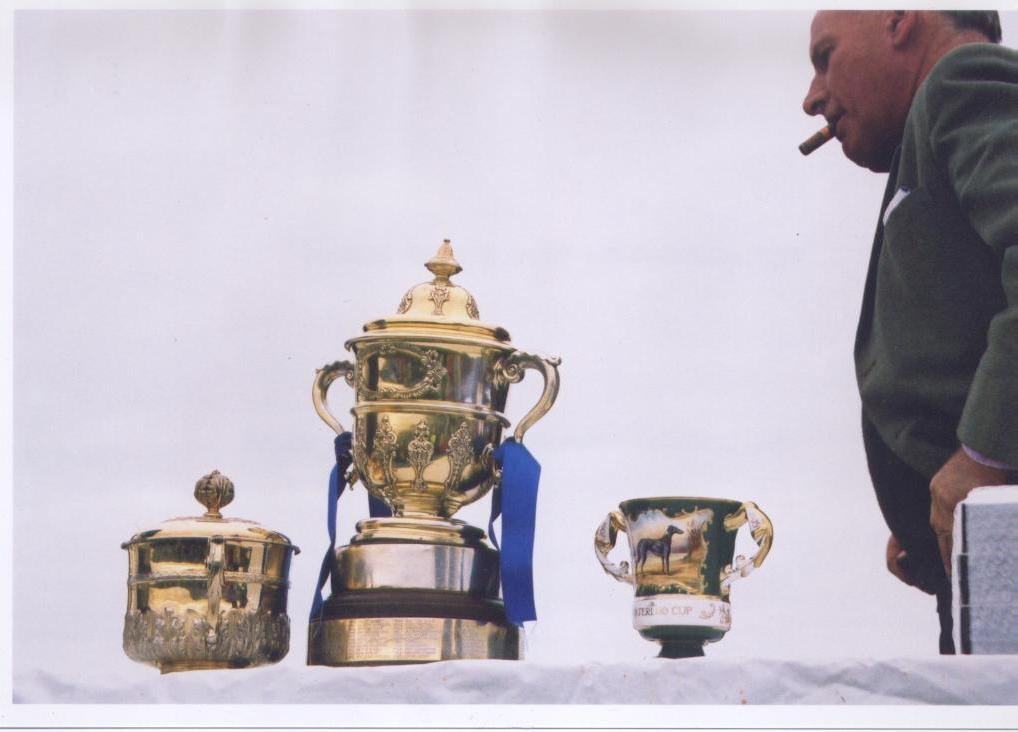
Sir Mark Prescott in 2005

Sir Mark Prescott, 3rd Baronet (born 1948), is an English race horse trainer with over 2000 winners to his name, including Alpinista, winner of the 2022 Prix de l'Arc de Triomphe. He is based at Heath House Stables, a historic 50-box yard at the bottom of Warren Hill in Newmarket.

== Background ==
Prescott is the son of Conservative Party MP Stanley Prescott and grandson of Sir William Prescott, 1st Baronet, who was also a Conservative MP. He attended Harrow School and in 1965 inherited the Prescott baronetcy from his uncle.

Prescott left school aged fifteen, with plans to become a jockey. He was riding in a race at Wye in 1965 when he broke his back in a fall, resulting in a nine-month hospital stay. He then joined the yard of Jack Waugh at Heath House Stables and took over the licence on Waugh's retirement in 1970.

== Career ==
In a career spanning more than fifty years, Prescott has trained over 2,000 winners. Although a British Classic has eluded him, he has won a French Classic as well as numerous Group races and major handicaps. Notable amongst his horses have been Spindrifter (winner of 13 races as a two-year-old in 1980), sprinter Pivotal (winner of the King's Stand Stakes and the Nunthorpe Stakes in 1996), Confidential Lady (winner of the French Classic Prix de Diane in 2006), Marsha (winner of the Nunthorpe Stakes in 2017), and multiple Group 1 winning sisters Alborada and Albanova. His greatest prize came when Alpinista, owned and bred by Kirsten Rausing won the 2022 Prix de l'Arc de Triomphe under Luke Morris. "It has been just a marvellous journey – I'm lucky to get a good one at this stage of my career" said Prescott of Alpinista after her victory.

In the early days of his of career Prescott employed assistant trainers for a period of two years but since 1999 William Butler has occupied the position and will take over the licence when Prescott retires. His former assistants include leading trainer William Haggas. George Duffield was stable jockey at Heath House for 31 seasons from 1974, winning 830 races for Prescott. He was succeeded by Seb Sanders, with Luke Morris riding as first jockey to the yard since 2012.

Author Jilly Cooper spoke to Prescott as part of her research for the novel Mount!

== Personal life ==
Prescott is unmarried. His interests include field sports such as hare coursing, fox hunting and bullfighting. On 1 September 2009, Prescott and television cook Clarissa Dickson-Wright received an absolute discharge from Scarborough Magistrates' Court after pleading guilty to hare coursing whilst attending an event organized by Yorkshire Greyhound Field Trialling Club in March 2007.

== Major wins ==
(United Kingdom) Great Britain

- Champion Stakes - (2) - Alborada (1998, 1999)
- Cheveley Park Stakes - (1) - Hooray (2010)
- King's Stand Stakes - (1) Pivotal (1996)
- Nassau Stakes - (2) Last Second (1996), Alborada (1998)
- Nunthorpe Stakes - (2) - Pivotal (1996), Marsha (2017)
- Yorkshire Oaks - (1) - Alpinista (2022)

France

- Prix de Diane - (1) - Confidential Lady (2006)
- Prix de l'Abbaye de Longchamp - (1) - Marsha (2016)
- Prix de l'Arc de Triomphe - (1) - Alpinista (2022)
- Prix de Royallieu - (1) - Consent (2025)
- Grand Prix de Saint-Cloud - (1) - Alpinista (2022)

Germany

- Preis von Europa - (2) - Albanova (2004), Alpinista (2021)
- Rheinland-Pokal / Grosser Preis von Bayern - (2) Albanova (2004), Alpinista (2021)
- Grosser Preis von Berlin - (3) Albanova (2004), Alpinista (2021), Tiffany (2026)

(Republic of Ireland) Ireland

- Pretty Polly Stakes -(1) - Alborada (1998)

Baronetage of the United Kingdom
Preceded by Richard Stanley Prescott	Baronet (of Godmanchester); 1965–present	Incumbent
