= Michael Hills (jockey) =

English jockey

Personal information
- Born: 22 January 1963 (age 63)
- Occupation: Jockey

Horse racing career
- Sport: Horse racing

Major racing wins
- British Classic Races: Derby Stakes (1996); Other major races: Matron Stakes (1987); Flying Five Stakes (1989, 1995); Vincent O'Brien National Stakes (1986); Fillies' Mile (1989); Irish Champion Stakes (1995); British Champions Sprint Stakes (2006); Sprint Cup (1997, 2007); Sun Chariot Stakes (2006); Nunthorpe Stakes (1988, 2005); Dewhurst Stakes (1985, 1988, 1996, 1999); Champion Stakes (2002); Middle Park Stakes (1993, 2007); Pretty Polly Stakes (2000); Irish 1,000 Guineas (1993, 1999); Prix de l'Abbaye de Longchamp (1988); Prix Morny (1994); Prix Jean Prat (1999); Prix d'Ispahan (1997); Dubai Golden Shaheen (2003); Nassau Stakes (1997); King George VI and Queen Elizabeth Stakes (1996); Queen Elizabeth II Jubilee Stakes (1994, 1997); Queen Anne Stakes (1995); King's Stand Stakes (2010); Lockinge Stakes (1997); Coronation Stakes (1997, 2005); Sussex Stakes (1996); Goodwood Cup (1991, 1992); Gold Cup (1994)

Racing awards
- British flat racing Champion Apprentice (1983)

Significant horses
- Arcadian Heights, Dark Angel, Distant Music, Equiano, First Island, First Trump, Further Flight, Handsome Sailor, Hula Angel, Huntingdale, In Command, La Cucaracha, Lockton, Maids Causeway, Nicer, Owington, Pentire, Rebecca Sharp, Red Clubs, Royal Applause, Ryafan, Scenic, Shaamit, Spinning Queen, Storming Home
- Updated on 21 October 2023

Michael Hills (born 22 January 1963) is a retired British flat racing jockey, who won the 1996 Epsom Derby on Shaamit. He was British flat racing Champion Apprentice of 1983. He is twin brother to retired flat racing jockey Richard Hills and their father was racehorse trainer Barry Hills.

== Career ==
Michael Patrick Hills was born in Newmarket, Suffolk on 22 January 1963. His first winner was also his first competitive ride - on Sky Thief at Nottingham on 13 August 1979, riding for his father. He then became apprentice to Jeremy Hindley. In 1982, he was suspended from riding for six months after striking fellow jockey Susan Gilbert across the face with a whip after a race.

In 1983, riding again for Hindley he became Champion Apprentice. His best season numerically was 1999 when he rode 92 winners. His final winner was Winter Song at Newmarket on 2 November 2012.

He is now a BHA jockey coach.

== British career wins ==
- 1979 – 5
- 1980 – 13
- 1981 – 10
- 1982 – 15
- 1983 – 39
- 1984 – 41
- 1985 – 39
- 1986 – 40
- 1987 – 75
- 1988 – 76
- 1989 – 77
- 1990 – 61
- 1991 – 65
- 1992 – 91
- 1993 – 86
- 1994 – 89
- 1995 – 74
- 1996 – 80
- 1997 – 84
- 1998 – 61
- 1999 – 92
- 2000 – 73
- 2001 – 58
- 2002 – 65
- 2003 – 57
- 2004 – 66
- 2005 – 56
- 2006 – 69
- 2007 – 50
- 2008 – 47
- 2009 – 57

== Major wins ==
(United Kingdom) Great Britain

- Ascot Gold Cup – (1) – Arcadian Heights (1994)
- Champion Stakes – (1) – Storming Home (2002)
- Coronation Stakes – (2) – Rebecca Sharp (1997), Maids Causeway (2005)
- Derby – (1) – Shaamit (1996)
- Dewhurst Stakes – (4) – Huntingdale (1985), Scenic (1988, dead heat), In Command (1996), Distant Music (1999)
- Fillies' Mile – (1) – Silk Slippers (1989)
- Golden Jubilee Stakes – (2) – Owington (1994), Royal Applause (1997)
- Haydock Sprint Cup – (2) – Royal Applause (1997), Red Clubs (2007)
- King George VI and Queen Elizabeth Stakes – (1) – Pentire (1996)
- King's Stand Stakes – (1) – Equiano (2010)
- Lockinge Stakes – (1) – First Island (1997)
- Middle Park Stakes – (2) – First Trump (1993), Dark Angel (2007)
- Nassau Stakes – (1) – Ryafan (1997)
- Nunthorpe Stakes – (2) – Handsome Sailor (1988), La Cucaracha (2005)
- Prince of Wales's Stakes – (1) – First Island (1996)
- Queen Anne Stakes – (1) – Nicolotte (1995)
- Sun Chariot Stakes – (1) – Spinning Queen (2006)
- Sussex Stakes – (1) – First Island (1996)

France

- Prix de l'Abbaye de Longchamp – (1) – Handsome Sailor (1988)
- Prix d'Ispahan – (1) – Sasuru (1997)
- Prix Jean Prat – (1) – Golden Snake (1999)
- Prix Morny – (1) – Hoh Magic (1994)

Hong Kong

- Hong Kong Cup – (1) – First Island (1996)

(Republic of Ireland) Ireland

- Irish 1,000 Guineas – (2) – Nicer (1993), Hula Angel (1999)
- Irish Champion Stakes – (1) – Pentire (1995)
- Matron Stakes – (1) – Pixie Erin (1987)
- National Stakes – (1) – Lockton (1986)
- Pretty Polly Stakes – (1) – Lady Upstage (2000)

Italy

- Premio Vittorio di Capua – (1) – Nicolotte (1995)

United Arab Emirates

- Dubai Golden Shaheen – (1) – State City (2003)

India

- The Clash of the Titans Thumbelina Trophy – (1) - Bonjour Tristesse (2000)

== See also ==
- List of jockeys
- List of significant families in British horse racing

== Bibliography ==
- Wright, Howard (1986). The Encyclopaedia of Flat Racing. London: Robert Hale. ISBN 0-7090-2639-0.
