= Nannina =

British-bred Thoroughbred racehorse

- Sire: Medicean
- Grandsire: Machiavellian
- Dam: Hill Hopper
- Damsire: Danehill
- Sex: Mare
- Foaled: 2003
- Country: United Kingdom
- Colour: Bay
- Breeder: Cheveley Park
- Owner: Cheveley Park
- Trainer: John Gosden
- Record: 16: 5-2-3
- Earnings: £493,000

Major wins
- Prestige Stakes (2005); Fillies' Mile (2005); Coronation Stakes (2006); Windsor Forest Stakes (2007)

Nannina is a retired British Thoroughbred racehorse. She won five of her sixteen races, with two seconds and three thirds, earning £493000 in a career that spanned three seasons.

== Background ==
Sired by Medicean, out of Hill Hopper (Danehill) and owned by Cheveley Park, Nannina was a group one British thoroughbred racehorse trained by John Gosden. She was ridden by Jimmy Fortune in all but one of her races.

== Racing career ==
Nannina won her first race as a two-year-old in 2005, a maiden at Pontefract. After two respectable efforts in group company, she went on to complete her two-year-old campaign with victories in the Prestige Stakes and in her defeat of future dual oaks winner, Alexandrova, in the Group One Fillies' Mile at Ascot.

Her first start as a three-year-old saw Nannina finish a well-beaten 12th to Speciosa in the 1000 Guineas. Her next start saw her confirm her two-year-old promise with a three-length win in the Coronation Stakes at Royal Ascot seven weeks later. She then went on to achieve second in the Falmouth Stakes before finishing third behind the older fillies Ouija Board and Alexander Goldrun in the Nassau Stakes.

Nannina raced five times as a four-year-old but did not progress. Her three-length win at Royal Ascot in the Group Two Windsor Forest Stakes was her only victory.

== Breeding record ==
In 2009 Nannina gave birth to a foal by Pivotal and in 2010 is visiting Derby winner New Approach.
