= Sweet Solera Stakes =

Flat horse race in Britain

- Class: Group 3
- Location: July Course; Newmarket, England
- Race type: Flat / Thoroughbred
- Sponsor: Newsells Park Stud
- Website: Newmarket

Race information
- Distance: 7f (1,408 metres)
- Surface: Turf
- Track: Straight
- Qualification: Two-year-old fillies
- Weight: 9 st 2 lb Penalties; 5 lb for G1 / G2 winners 3 lb for G3 winners
- Purse: £60,000 (2025); 1st: £34,026

Sweet Solera Stakes
2026
Sugar Yes Please	Nuit D'eclair	Martinet

Previous years
2025
Dance To The Music	Princess Petrol	Venetian Lace
2024
Lake Victoria	Mountain Breeze	Elsie's Ruan
2023
Fallen Angel	Soprano	Les Bleus
2022
Lakota Sioux	Dandy Alys	Mottisfont
2021
Majestic Glory	Wild Beauty	Value Theory

2020-2011
2020
Star Of Emaraaty	Dubai Fountain	Seattle Rock
2019
West End Girl	Soffika	Dark Lady
2018
Main Edition	La Pelosa	Model Guest
2017
Tajaanus	Juliet Capulet	Capla Temptress
2016
Nations Alexander	Grecian Light	On Her Toes
2015
Blue Bayou	Fireglow	Marenko
2014
Muraaqaba	Calypso Beat	Winters Moon
2013
Ihtimal	Midnite Angel	Wedding Ring
2012
Certify	Sky Lantern	Reyaadah
2011
Discourse	Lily's Angel	Kinetica

2010-2001
2010
White Moonstone	Crying Lightening	Khor Sheed
2009
Long Lashes	Blue Maiden	Sent From Heaven
2008
Rainbow View	Misdaqeya	Minor Vamp
2007
Albabilia	Don't Forget Faith	Kay Es Jay
2006
English Ballet	Princess Taise	Satulagi
2005
Nasheej	Confidential Lady	Deveron
2004
Maids Causeway	Slip Dance	Park Romance
2003
Bay Tree	Qasirah	Nataliya
2002
Soviet Song	Summitville	Miss Assertive
2001
Muklah	Lady Dominatrix	Shadow Roll

2000-1991
2000
Peaceful Paradise	Bring Plenty	Rizerie
1999
Princess Ellen	Eurolink Raindance	Dignify
1998
Kareymah	Etizaaz	Halloa
1997
Diamond White	Stop Out	Silent Tribute
1996
Catwalk	Fernanda	Dancing Drop
1995
Bint Salsabil	Staffin	Witch Of Fife
1994
Jural	The Jotter	Watch The Clock
1993
Fairy Heights	Taghareed	Song Of Years
1992
Mystic Goddess	Reine De Neige	Holly Golightly
1991
Pearl Angel	Venturina	Kasikci

1990-1988
1990
Trojan Crown	Jameelaty	Moonflute
1989
Moon Cactus	Gharam	Endless Joy
1988
Life At The Top	Miss Secreto	Bold Vision

The Sweet Solera Stakes is a Group 3 flat horse race in Great Britain open to two-year-old fillies. It is run on the July Course at Newmarket over a distance of 7 furlongs (1,408 metres), and it is scheduled to take place each year in August.

The event is named after Sweet Solera, the winner of the 1000 Guineas and Epsom Oaks in 1961. For a period it was classed at Listed level, and it was promoted to Group 3 status in 2004.

The leading horses from the Sweet Solera Stakes often go on to compete in the May Hill Stakes and the Fillies' Mile.

== Records ==
Leading jockey (4 wins):

- Steve Cauthen - Trevita (1979), Lucayan Princess (1985), Laluche (1986), Moon Cactus (1989)
- Michael Hills – Catwalk (1996), Peaceful Paradise (2000), Bay Tree (2003), English Ballet (2006)

Leading trainer (5 wins):

- Barry Hills - Fiordiligi (1977), Muklah (2001), Bay Tree (2003), Maids Causeway (2004), English Ballet (2006)
- Mark Johnston - Jural (1994), Muraaqaba (2014), Main Edition (2018), West End Girl (2019), Lakota Sioux (2022)

== Winners ==
Year	Winner	Jockey	Trainer	Time
1973	St Agnes	Brian Taylor	Gavin Pritchard-Gordon	1:30.95
1974	Indian Question	Lester Piggott	Henry Cecil	1:27.89
1975	Ippolyti	Frank Morby	Peter Walwyn	1:29.08
1976	Taffytina	Geoff Baxter	Peter Walwyn	1:30.92
1977	Fiordiligi	Robert Street	Barry Hills	1:28.01
1978	Mixed Applause	Frankie Durr	Henry Cecil	1:29.44
1979	Trevita	Steve Cauthen	Harry Thomson Jones	1:29.61
1980	Exclusively Raised	Greville Starkey	Michael Stoute	1:28.04
1981	Baltimore Belle	Lester Piggott	Henry Cecil	1:29.20
1982	Flamenco	John Matthias	Ian Balding	1:29.69
1983	Mystery Ship	George Duffield	Mark Usher	1:28.22
1984	Dance Machine	Brian Rouse	John Dunlop	1:28.88
1985	Lucayan Princess	Steve Cauthen	Henry Cecil	1:27.01
1986	Laluche	Steve Cauthen	Henry Cecil	1:29.37
1987	William's Bird	Ray Cochrane	David Elsworth	1:26.75
1988	Life at the Top	Michael Roberts	Alec Stewart	1:25.19
1989	Moon Cactus	Steve Cauthen	Henry Cecil	1:26.77
1990	Trojan Crown	Gary Carter	Geoff Wragg	1:25.83
1991	Pearl Angel	Michael Roberts	Brooke Sanders	1:28.80
1992	Mystic Goddess	Willie Carson	Michael Stoute	1:27.61
1993	Fairy Heights	Alan Munro	Neville Callaghan	1:26.41
1994	Jural	Philip Robinson	Mark Johnston	1:26.89
1995	Bint Salsabil	Willie Carson	John Dunlop	1:25.68
1996	Catwalk	Michael Hills	William Haggas	1:27.26
1997	Diamond White	David McCabe	Giles Bravery	1:25.11
1998	Kareymah	Frankie Dettori	David Loder	1:27.13
1999	Princess Ellen	Gary Stevens	Peter Chapple-Hyam	1:26.23
2000	Peaceful Paradise	Michael Hills	John Hills	1:25.92
2001	Muklah	Willie Supple	Barry Hills	1:27.80
2002	Soviet Song	Oscar Urbina	James Fanshawe	1:29.98
2003	Bay Tree	Michael Hills	Barry Hills	1:25.20
2004	Maids Causeway	Steve Drowne	Barry Hills	1:25.50
2005	Nasheej	Pat Dobbs	Richard Hannon Sr.	1:24.62
2006	English Ballet	Michael Hills	Barry Hills	1:25.96
2007	Albabilia	Ryan Moore	Clive Brittain	1:25.67
2008	Rainbow View	Jimmy Fortune	John Gosden	1:27.80
2009	Long Lashes	Ted Durcan	Saeed bin Suroor	1:25.90
2010	White Moonstone	Frankie Dettori	Saeed bin Suroor	1:27.02
2011	Discourse	Frankie Dettori	Mahmood Al Zarooni	1:23.96
2012	Certify	Mickael Barzalona	Mahmood Al Zarooni	1:27.15
2013	Ihtimal	William Buick	Saeed bin Suroor	1:24.07
2014	Muraaqaba	Dane O'Neill	Mark Johnston	1:28.04
2015	Blue Bayou	Dane O'Neill	Brian Meehan	1:26.91
2016	Nations Alexander	Pat Dobbs	Richard Hannon Jr.	1:26.03
2017	Tajaanus	Dane O'Neill	Richard Hannon Jr.	1:26.35
2018	Main Edition	P. J. McDonald	Mark Johnston	1:27.31
2019	West End Girl	Franny Norton	Mark Johnston	1:25.32
2020	Star of Emaraaty	Kevin Stott	Kevin Ryan	1:23.47
2021	Majestic Glory	David Probert	Andrew Balding	1:25.83
2022	Lakota Sioux	James Doyle	Charlie & Mark Johnston	1:26.04
2023	Fallen Angel	Daniel Tudhope	Karl Burke	1:24.48
2024	Lake Victoria	Sean Levey	Aidan O'Brien	1:25.69
2025	Dance To The Music	Billy Loughnane	Charlie Appleby	1:25.75
2026	Sugar Yes Please	Charles Bishop	Eve Johnson Houghton	1:25.75

== See also ==
- Horse racing in Great Britain
- List of British flat horse races
