= Fairy Heights =

Irish-bred Thoroughbred racehorse

- Sire: Fairy King
- Grandsire: Northern Dancer
- Dam: Commanche Belle
- Damsire: Shirley Heights
- Sex: Mare
- Foaled: 20 February 1991
- Country: Ireland
- Colour: Bay
- Breeder: Ron Con Ltd and Swettenham Stud
- Owner: Frank W Golding
- Trainer: Neville Callaghan
- Record: 7: 3-1-0
- Earnings: £139,794

Major wins
- Sweet Solera Stakes (1993); Fillies' Mile (1993)

Fairy Heights (foaled 20 February 1991) was an Irish-bred British-trained Thoroughbred racehorse and broodmare. In a racing career which lasted from July 1993 until April 1994 she won three of her even races. She was one of the best two-year-old fillies of her generation in Britain in 1993: after finishing unplaced on her debut she won her next three races including the Sweet Solera Stakes and the Fillies' Mile before finishing second in the Racing Post Trophy. After failing to recover her best form in 1994 she was retired from racing. She has had some success as a broodmare in the United States.

== Background ==
Fairy Heights was a bay mare bred in Ireland by Ron Con Ltd and Robert Sangster's Swettenham Stud. She was sired by Fairy King, an American-bred stallion who was retired after sustaining an injury after a single racecourse appearance in Ireland. He became a very successful breeding stallion, siring major winners including Turtle Island, Helissio, Oath and Falbrav. Her dam Commanche Belle failed to win in four races but was a half-sister to several winners including Zimbalon (Ormonde Stakes) and Band (Yorkshire Cup).

As a yearling in October 1992 the filly was consigned to the Tattersalls sale and was bought for 41,000 guineas by the trainer Neville Callaghan. Fairy Heights entered the ownership of Frank Golding and was trained by Callaghan at Newmarket.

== Racing career ==
=== 1993: two-year-old season ===
Fairy Heights made little impact on her racing debut. Starting a 50/1 outsider in a maiden race over six furlongs at Newmarket Racecourse on 8 July she finished seventh of the fourteen runners behind the Roger Charlton-trained colt Magnasonic. Eight days later at the same course the filly started 100/30 second favourite for a maiden race over seven furlongs. Ridden by Pat Eddery, she was held up at the rear of the six-runner field before taking the lead a quarter of mile from the finish and drawing way to win by three and a half lengths from the favourite La Quica. On 7 August the filly was moved up in class for the Listed Sweet Solera Stakes over the same course and distance. Ridden by Alan Munro she started 7/2 second favourite behind the Harry Thomson Jones-trained Taghareed in a ten-runner field. After tracking the leaders, Fairy Heights overtook Taghareed inside the final furlong and won by half a length.

On 25 September Fairy Heights was stepped up in class and distance to contest the Group One Fillies' Mile at Ascot Racecourse. Ridden by Cash Asmussen she started at odds of 11/1 in an eleven runner field. The May Hill Stakes winner Hawajiss started favourite ahead of the Henry Cecil-trained Averti, whilst the other runners included Kissing Cousin and A Smooth One (Princess Margaret Stakes). Asmussen held the filly up at the rear of the field and turned into the straight in eighth place behind Kissing Cousin. Fairy Heights began to make progress two furlongs out, took the lead inside the final furlong and won by one and a half lengths from Dance To The Top, with Kissing Cousin three quarters of a length away in third place. Callaghan later commented "I'm desperately lucky to have her. When I bought her at the sales for 41,000 gns she really caught my eye, and, for once, she was a lucky one because plenty catch the eye and you wish you'd never seen them. She's been a pleasure to deal with from day one".

At Doncaster Racecourse on 23 October, Fairy Heights was matched against male opposition and started the 11/8 favourite in a nine-runner field for the Racing Post Trophy. With Asmussen again in the saddle she raced just behind the leaders before moving into second place behind King's Theatre early in the straight. She stayed on well in the closing stages without ever looking likely to overhaul the colt and finished second, beaten a length, with a gap of three lengths back to Bude in third place.

=== 1994: three-year-old season ===
Fairy Heights began her second season in the Nell Gwyn Stakes (a trial race for the 1000 Guineas) over seven furlongs at Newmarket on 12 April. Ridden by Frankie Dettori she started the 5/2 favourite but appeared outpaced in the closing stages and finished fifth of the eleven runners behind Mehthaaf. Sixteen days later Fairy Heights was one of fifteen runners to contest the 181st running of the 1000 Guineas over the Rowley Mile course and started the 9/1 fourth choice in the betting behind Mehthaaf, Prophecy and Coup de Genie. She was ridden by Eddery and raced prominently for most of the way before fading in the closing stages to finish ninth behind Las Meninas.

In June Fairy Heights entered the ownership Mrs J Maxwell Moran and was transferred to the stable of Dermot Weld in Ireland but never raced for her new connections.

== Breeding record ==
After her retirement from racing Fairy Heights became a broodmare in the United States. She has produced at least fourteen foals and seven winners:

- Ransom the Belle, a bay filly, foaled in 1996, sired by Red Ransom. Unraced.
- Fairy West, bay filly, 1997, by Gone West. Won three races.
- Heart on Wave, bay filly, 2000, by Storm Cat. Won one race.
- Plummet, bay filly, 2001, by Silver Hawk. Failed to win in six races.
- Hashima, bay filly, 2002, by Kingmambo. Failed to win in ten races.
- Mr Mahatan, bay colt, 2004, by Distorted Humor. Unraced.
- Dynaffair, bay filly, 2005, by Dynaformer. Failed to win in four races.
- Highway Code, bay colt (later gelded, 2006, by Street Cry. Won six races.
- Morningsideheights, bay filly, 2007, by Malibu Moon. Won eight races.
- Coside, grey colt (later gelded), 2008, by Cozzene. Failed to win in two races.
- Iron King, bay colt (later gelded), 2009, by Swain. Won two races.
- Notional King, bay colt, 2011, by Notional. Won one race.
- Fairy Luck, brown filly, 2012, by Notional. Failed to win in eight races to date (December 2015).
- Ocala Spirit, bay filly, 2013, by Notional. Won one race to date (December 2015).

== Pedigree ==
Pedigree of Fairy Heights (IRE), bay mare, 1991
Sire Fairy King (USA) 1982	Northern Dancer (CAN); 1961	Nearctic	Nearco
Sire Fairy King (USA) 1982	Northern Dancer (CAN); 1961	Nearctic	Lady Angela
Sire Fairy King (USA) 1982	Northern Dancer (CAN); 1961	Natalma	Native Dancer
Sire Fairy King (USA) 1982	Northern Dancer (CAN); 1961	Natalma	Almahmoud
Sire Fairy King (USA) 1982	Fairy Bridge (USA); 1975	Bold Reason	Hail To Reason
Sire Fairy King (USA) 1982	Fairy Bridge (USA); 1975	Bold Reason	Lalun
Sire Fairy King (USA) 1982	Fairy Bridge (USA); 1975	Special	Forli
Sire Fairy King (USA) 1982	Fairy Bridge (USA); 1975	Special	Thong
Dam Commanche Belle (GB) 1983	Shirley Heights (GB); 1975	Mill Reef	Never Bend
Dam Commanche Belle (GB) 1983	Shirley Heights (GB); 1975	Mill Reef	Milan Mill
Dam Commanche Belle (GB) 1983	Shirley Heights (GB); 1975	Hardiemma	Hardicanute
Dam Commanche Belle (GB) 1983	Shirley Heights (GB); 1975	Hardiemma	Grand Cross
Dam Commanche Belle (GB) 1983	Zither (GB); 1965	Vienna	Aureole
Dam Commanche Belle (GB) 1983	Zither (GB); 1965	Vienna	Turkish Blood
Dam Commanche Belle (GB) 1983	Zither (GB); 1965	Electronic	Borealis
Dam Commanche Belle (GB) 1983	Zither (GB); 1965	Electronic	Metallic (Family: 14-f)
