= Ribchester (horse) =

Irish-bred Thoroughbred racehorse

- Racing silks of David W Armstrong and Godolphin
- Sire: Iffraaj
- Grandsire: Zafonic
- Dam: Mujarah
- Damsire: Marju
- Sex: Colt
- Foaled: 25 March 2013
- Country: Ireland
- Colour: Bay
- Breeder: Audrey Thompson & M O'Brien
- Owner: David W Armstrong; Godolphin
- Trainer: Richard Fahey
- Record: 14: 6-4-3
- Earnings: £2,356,168

Major wins
- Mill Reef Stakes (2015); Jersey Stakes (2016); Prix Jacques Le Marois (2016); Lockinge Stakes (2017); Queen Anne Stakes (2017); Prix du Moulin (2017)

Awards
- Top-rated British-trained three-year-old (2016)

Ribchester (foaled 25 March 2013) is an Irish-bred, British-trained Thoroughbred racehorse. As a two-year-old in 2015 he finished second in the Gimcrack Stakes on his second racecourse appearance and then won the Group Two Mill Reef Stakes. In 2016 he was rated the best British-trained colt of his generation and was one of the top milers in Europe, winning the Jersey Stakes at Royal Ascot and the Prix Jacques Le Marois in France as well as being placed in the 2000 Guineas, Sussex Stakes and Queen Elizabeth II Stakes. In 2017 he added further major victories in the Lockinge Stakes, Queen Anne Stakes and Prix du Moulin

== Background ==
Ribchester is a bay colt with a small, oddly-shaped white star and white coronet markings on his hind legs bred by Audrey Thompson & M O'Brien of the County Tipperary-based Kilmore Stud. As a foal in November 2013 he was put up for auction at Goffs and sold for €78,000 to the bloodstock agent Jamie Railton. In October 2014 the yearling returned to the Goffs sales ring and was bought for €105,000 by David W Armstrong's Chorley-based Highfield Farm. The colt, who is named after the village of Ribchester, was sent into training with Richard Fahey at Malton in North Yorkshire.

He was sired by Iffraaj, who won the Group 2 Park Stakes twice and the Lennox Stakes once, as well as finishing second in the 2006 July Cup. His other progeny have included Rizeena, Chriselliam, Hot Streak and Wootton Bassett. Ribchester's dam Mujarah showed no racing ability whatsoever, finishing unplaced in all five of her races. Her grand-dam Mehthaaf won the Irish 1,000 Guineas and was a half-sister to Elnadim as well as being closely related to Dubai Millennium and Timber Country.

== Racing career ==
=== 2015: two-year-old season ===
Ribchester made his racecourse debut in a maiden race over six furlongs at Doncaster Racecourse on 9 July. Starting at odds of 8/1 in an eight-runner field he took the lead a furlong out but was overtaken and beaten three quarters of a length by the William Haggas-trained Melabi. Despite his defeat, the colt was then stepped up sharply in class for the Group Two Gimcrack Stakes at York Racecourse and started a 25/1 outsider. Ridden as on his debut by Tony Hamilton he overcame a poor start and stayed on well in the closing stages to finish second behind Ajaya with Raucous in third place. After the race he was purchased privately by Sheikh Mohammed's Godolphin organisation but remained in training with Fahey.

On his first appearance for his new owner Ribchester was partnered by James Doyle and started the 13/8 favourite for the Group Two Mill Reef Stakes at Newbury Racecourse on 19 September. The best of his five opponents appeared to be Raucous and the Godolphin second string Log Out Island (runner-up in the Norfolk Stakes). After racing towards the rear of the field he moved up on the outside, overtook Log Out Island approaching the final furlong and despite looking "green" (inexperienced) he stayed on to win by one and a quarter lengths. Doyle commented "It was a solid performance... he was just pricking his ears a bit in the end. He's a big, raw type with plenty of scope and I would imagine that he will be much better next year" whilst Fahey said "He's a big baby and it's amazing how a race can bring horses on. York verified how good we thought he was and today has confirmed it. If I've got a Guineas horse, it's him."

=== 2016: three-year-old season ===
Ribchester began his second season with a trip to France for the Prix Djebel over 1400 metres on heavy ground at Maisons-Laffitte Racecourse on 7 April. He finished second to Cheikeljack but was relegated to fifth for hampering the third-placed Attendu when veering to the left in the closing stages. Twenty-three days after his run in France, Ribchester started a 33/1 outsider for the 208th running of the 2000 Guineas over the Rowley Mile course at Newmarket. Ridden by William Buick he raced in mid-division before staying on in the last quarter mile to finish third of the thirteen runners behind Galileo Gold and Massaat.

At Royal Ascot in June Ribchester was again partnered by Buick when he was dropped in distance for the seven-furlong Jersey Stakes in which, as a Group Two winner, he had to carry a five-pound weight penalty. The improving handicapper Castle Harbour started favourite with Ribchester joint second in the betting on 7/1 alongside the gelding Gifted Master (Autumn Stakes, Pavilion Stakes). Ribchester was always going well, moved up to join the leaders two furlongs out and drew away in the closing stages to win by two and a quarter lengths from the Michael Stoute-trained Thikriyaat. Fahey admitted that he had "chickened out" of running the colt in the more competitive St James's Palace Stakes but added "Mentally, the horse is a huge baby and still backward, and he's going to make a lovely four-year-old. I was worried because this race was quite competitive, but he destroyed them"

The Sussex Stakes at Goodwood Racecourse on 27 July included some top-class older horses including Toormore and Lightning Spear but the betting was dominated by three-year-old colts with Ribchester starting the 8/1 fourth favourite behind The Gurkha, Galileo Gold and Awtaad. Ribchester produced a strong late run on the outside but in a very tight finish he was beaten into third place, a short head and a neck behind The Gurkha and Galileo Gold. On 14 August Ribchester was sent to France for the second time and started 2.75/1 second favourite behind Galileo Gold for the Prix Jacques Le Marois over 1600 metres at Deauville Racecourse. The other nine runners included Ervedya, Esoterique, Vadamos (Prix du Muguet), Lightning Spear, Stormy Atlantic (Craven Stakes), Dicton (Prix de Fontainebleau), Arod (Summer Mile Stakes) and Spectre (Prix Imprudence). Ribchester was restrained by Buick in mid-division as Galileo Gold and Arod disputed the early lead before making a forward move in the last 400 metres. Vadamos went to the front 300 metres out, but Ribchester overtook the French horse in the closing stages and won "readily" by half a length. After the race Fahey said "He is a horse with an awful lot of speed, very talented, and keeps improving with racing. He is getting stronger and better. He had to dig deep today and came out with flying colors."

On his final run of the year, Ribchester started the 7/2 second favourite behind Minding for the Queen Elizabeth II Stakes over the straight mile course at Ascot Racecourse on 15 October. After tracking the leaders he moved into contention as Minding went to the front two furlongs out. He appeared to be outpaced by the favourite but kept on well to reduce the Irish filly's advantage and finished second, beaten half a length, with Lighting Spear in third. The other beaten horses included Awtaad, Galileo Gold, Jet Setting and Hit It A Bomb (Breeders' Cup Juvenile Turf).

=== 2017: four-year-old season ===
For his first run of 2017 Ribchester was sent to the United Arab Emirates and moved up in trip for the Dubai Turf over nine furlong at Meydan Racecourse on 25 March. He was in contention from the start and was sent to the front by Buick approaching the last quarter mile. He maintained his advantage until the last hundred yards but was then overtaken and finished third to the Japanese filly Vivlos and the French colt Heshem. On his return to Europe the colt contested the Lockinge Stakes at Newbury in May and started 7/4 favourite in front of seven opponents headed by Galileo Gold and the Irish filly Somehow. Ribchester took the lead from the start and set a steady pace before accelerating in the last quarter mile. He drew away from the field in the closing stages and won by three and three quarter lengths from Lightning Spear. Richard Fahey admitted "I was quite nervous today and I don't do nerves", before adding "It was a big day, you just want to perform and, God, he did. This guy's special".

At Royal Ascot on 20 June Ribchester started 11/10 favourite against fifteen opponents in the Queen Anne Stakes. After tracking the leaders he went to the front a furlong out and won by a length and a quarter from Mutakayyef in a new course record time of 1:36.60. Buick described the winner as "a fabulous horse... the best miler I've ridden". Ribchester was generally expected to add to his tally of Group 1 wins in the Sussex Stakes at Goodwood on 2 August especially after his main rival Churchill was withdrawn on account of the exceptionally testing conditions. Racing on soft, wet turf in heavy rain, Ribchester led for most of the way but was overtaken in the final furlong and despite rallying strongly in the closing strides he was beaten a neck by the 20/1 outsider Here Comes When.

Ribchester returned to the track on 10 September and started favourite for the Prix du Moulin, run that year at Chantilly Racecourse. His opponents on this occasion were Lightning Spear, Taareef (Prix Messidor), Inns of Court (Prix de la Porte Maillot), Robin of Navan (Critérium de Saint-Cloud) Lady Frankel (Prix de Lieurey) and Masaat (Hungerford Stakes). After tracking the leader Robin of Navan, Ribchester went to the front 400 metres from the finish and stayed on well to win by three quarters of a length from Taareef.

== Assessment ==
In the official ratings for European two-year-olds of 2015, Ribchester was given a rating of 113, making him the twelfth-best colt of the year, eleven pounds behind the champion Air Force Blue.

In the 2016 edition of the World's Best Racehorse Rankings Ribchester was given a rating of 122, making him the 18th best racehorse in the world and the best three-year-old trained in Britain.

In the 2017 World's Best Racehorse Rankings, Ribchester was rated the ninth-best horse in the world and the best miler in Europe.

== Stud career ==
Ribchester was retired to stud in 2018 in Australia. He sired Plymstock, a stakes performer in Australia. In 2020, he relocated to Huanui Farm in New Zealand to replace his sire Iffraaj on their roster.

=== Notable Progeny ===
c = colt, f = filly, g = gelding

Foaled	Name	Sex	Major Wins
2019	Facteur Cheval	g	Dubai Turf

== Pedigree ==
Pedigree of Ribchester, bay colt, 2013
Sire Iffraaj (GB) 2001	Zafonic (USA); 1990	Gone West	Mr. Prospector
Sire Iffraaj (GB) 2001	Zafonic (USA); 1990	Gone West	Secrettame
Sire Iffraaj (GB) 2001	Zafonic (USA); 1990	Zaizafon	The Minstrel
Sire Iffraaj (GB) 2001	Zafonic (USA); 1990	Zaizafon	Mofida
Sire Iffraaj (GB) 2001	Pastorale (GB); 1988	Nureyev	Northern Dancer
Sire Iffraaj (GB) 2001	Pastorale (GB); 1988	Nureyev	Special
Sire Iffraaj (GB) 2001	Pastorale (GB); 1988	Park Appeal	Ahonoora
Sire Iffraaj (GB) 2001	Pastorale (GB); 1988	Park Appeal	Balidaress
Dam Mujarah (IRE) 2008	Marju (IRE); 1988	Last Tycoon	Try My Best
Dam Mujarah (IRE) 2008	Marju (IRE); 1988	Last Tycoon	Mill Princess
Dam Mujarah (IRE) 2008	Marju (IRE); 1988	Flame of Tara	Artaius
Dam Mujarah (IRE) 2008	Marju (IRE); 1988	Flame of Tara	Welsh Flame
Dam Mujarah (IRE) 2008	Tanaghum (GB); 2000	Darshaan	Shirley Heights
Dam Mujarah (IRE) 2008	Tanaghum (GB); 2000	Darshaan	Delsy
Dam Mujarah (IRE) 2008	Tanaghum (GB); 2000	Mehthaaf	Nureyev
Dam Mujarah (IRE) 2008	Tanaghum (GB); 2000	Mehthaaf	Elle Seule (Family: 4-m)
