= Mehthaaf =

American-bred Thoroughbred racehorse

- Sire: Nureyev
- Grandsire: Northern Dancer
- Dam: Elle Seule
- Damsire: Exclusive Native
- Sex: Mare
- Foaled: 3 February 1991
- Country: United States
- Colour: Bay
- Breeder: Shadwell Farm
- Owner: Victor Matthews; Hamdan Al Maktoum
- Trainer: John Dunlop
- Record: 12: 4-0-4
- Earnings: £249,351

Major wins
- Nell Gwyn Stakes (1994); Irish 1,000 Guineas (1994); Celebration Mile (1994)

Mehthaaf (foaled 3 February 1991) was an American-bred, British-trained Thoroughbred racehorse and broodmare. She showed great promise as a two-year-old in 1993, winning on her second racecourse appearance and going on to finish third in both the Lowther Stakes and the Prix Marcel Boussac. As a three-year-old, she won the Nell Gwyn Stakes and ran fourth when favourite for the 1000 Guineas before winning the Irish 1,000 Guineas. Later in the season, she produced arguably her best performance with an emphatic victory over male opponents in the Celebration Mile. She also ran third in the Coronation Stakes and Prix Jacques Le Marois as well as finishing fourth in the Champion Stakes. After her retirement from racing, she had considerable success as a broodmare.

== Background ==
Mehthaaf was a bay mare with a white blaze and three white socks bred in Kentucky by Shadwell Farm, the breeding operation of her owner Hamdan Al Maktoum. The filly was sent to Europe where she was trained by John Dunlop at Arundel, West Sussex and was ridden in ten of her twelve races by the veteran Scottish jockey Willie Carson. She raced in the colours of Victor Matthews for her first six races.

Mehthaaf was sired by Nureyev, best known as a racehorse for being disqualified after beating Known Fact and Posse to "win" the 2000 Guineas in 1980. Apart from Mehthaaf, Nureyev was the sire of the winners of at least forty-five Group One/Grade I including Peintre Celebre, Soviet Star, Sonic Lady, Spinning World, Zilzal, Stravinsky and Miesque. His career as a stallion has been described as "outstanding".

Mehthaaf's dam Elle Seule was a high-class racemare, whose wins included the Prix d'Astarte in 1986. After foaling Mehthaaf, she produced the July Cup winner Elnadim, whilst another of her foals, Only Seule, was the female-line ancestor of Intello. Elle Seule's dam Fall Aspen was an outstanding broodmare whose other descendants have included Hamas, Timber Country and Dubai Millennium. Shadwell Farm bought Elle Seule, with Mehthaaf in utero for $1.5 million at the 1990 Keeneland November Breeding Stock Sale.

== Racing career ==
=== 1993: two-year-old season ===
Mehthaaf made her racecourse debut in a maiden race over six furlongs at Nottingham on 8 July and started at odds of 8/1 in a nine-runner field. Ridden by Richard Hills she finished fourth, three and a half lengths behind the winner Tricorne. Carson took over when the filly started 2/1 second choice in the betting for a similar race at Haydock Park on 7 August. Racing on soft ground she took the lead at half way and drew right away from her six opponents to win by ten lengths. Telwve days after her win at Haydock Mehthaaf was stepped up in class for the Group Two Lowther Stakes at York Racecourse and started second favourite behind the Queen Mary Stakes winner Risky. After tracking the leaders she stayed on without being able to accelerate and finished third behind Velvet Moon and Risky. On her final run of the year she was sent to France for the Group One Prix Marcel Boussac over 1600 metres at Longchamp Racecourse on 3 October. After being among the leaders from the start she took the lead in the straight before being overtaken 200 metres out and finishing third to Sierra Madre and Flagbird.

=== 1994: three-year-old season ===
==== Spring ====
On her first appearance as a three-year-old Mehthaaf contested the Nell Gwyn Stakes (a major trial for the 1000 Guineas) over seven furlongs at Newmarket Racecourse on 12 April. She started 100/30 second favourite behind the Fillies' Mile winner Fairy Heights in a field which also included the Cheveley Park Stakes winner Prophecy. Mehthaff took the lead soon after the start before accelerating clear in the closing stages to win in "impressive" style by five lengths from Prophecy. After the race John Dunlop commented "That was a pleasant surprise. She won very easily, quickening up off a slow pace and getting away from them, and that's encouraging. She's not flamboyant at home but has thrived and strengthened with her work".

On 28 April Mehthaaf was made the 2/1 favourite in a fifteen-runner field for the 1000 Guineas over Newmarket's Rowley Mile. She raced in second before taking the lead three furlongs out but was outpaced and overtaken in the closing stages to finish fourth behind Las Meninas, Balanchine and Coup de Genie. At the Curragh on 21 May Mehthaaf faced Las Meninas again on softer ground in the Irish 1000 Guineas and started 5/2 second favourite behind her rival. The best fancied of the other eight runners included Relatively Special (Rockfel Stakes) and Morcote (C L Weld Park Stakes). The outsider Salvezza set the early pace with Carson positioning Mehthaaf just behind the leaders before switching left to make his challenge approaching the last quarter mile. Mahthaaf took the lead a furlong and a half out and held off the challenge of Las Meninas to win by one and a half lengths with Relatively Special and Morecote taking third and fourth.

==== Summer ====
The ground was much firmer when Mehthaaf contested the Coronation Stakes at Royal Ascot in June. Starting at odds of 5/1 she stayed on in the straight to finish third behind Kissing Cousin and Eternal Reve with Lemon Souffle, Las Meninas in fourth and fifth. The filly was then matched against colts and older horses for the first time when she was sent to France for the Prix Jacques Le Marois over 1600 metres at Deauville Racecourse on 14 August. She made steady progress in the latter stages without ever looking likely to win and took third place behind East of the Moon and Sayyedati. Thirteen days after her run in France the filly again took on open weight-for-age competition in the Group Two Celebration Mile at Goodwood Racecourse. She started second choice in the betting behind the Irish 2,000 Guineas winner Turtle Island with the other four runners being Swing Low (winner of the race in 1993), Emperor Jones (Lockinge Stakes), Bin Ajwaad (third in the 2000 Guineas) and Mistle Cat (Heron Stakes). After being restrained by Carson in the early stages Mehthaaf accelerated into the lead inside the final furlong and drew away to win by two and a half lengths from Emperor Jones. After what Sue Montgomery, writing for The Independent described as a "scintillating display" Dunlop said "She's not a big filly, but she's very, very good when she's got her ground, and she's tough and takes her racing well. She ran to her best today".

==== Autumn ====
On 24 September at Ascot Mehthaaf, racing on her favoured good-to-soft ground, started at odds of 7/1 in a strongly-contested renewal of the Queen Elizabeth II Stakes but after reaching third place on the final turn she faded to finish last of the nine runners behind the upset winner Maroof. For her final racecourse appearance, the filly was stepped up in distance for the Champion Stakes over ten furlongs at Newmarket on 15 October in which she was ridden by Richard Hills and started a 12/1 outsider. The race ended in a five-way "blanket finish" with Mehthaaf taking fourth place beaten a short head, a neck and head by Dernier Empereur, Grand Lodge and Muhtarram with Hatoof a neck away in fifth.

== Breeding record ==
After her retirement from racing Mehthaaf became a broodmare for Shadwell Farm. She produced thirteen foals and eight winners, with the best off her offspring being the Group Two winner Najah.

- Raaqi, a bay colt, foaled in 1996, sired by Nashwan. Won one race.
- Eljohar, chestnut colt, 1997, by Nashwas. Won one race.
- Najah, bay filly, 1998, by Nashwan. Won two races including the Premio Lydia Tesio.
- Zaajel, bay colt, 1999, by Nashwan. Won three races.
- Tanaghum, bay filly, 2000, by Darshaan. Won one race. Female-line ancestor of Ribchester.
- Alshamatry, chestnut filly, 2002, by Seeking The Gold. Unraced.
- Rezeez, brown colt, 2004, by Seeking The Gold. Unplaced on only start.
- Tasdeer, bay colt (later gelded), 2005, by Rahy. Won three races.
- Thaahira, bay filly, 2007, by Dynaformer. Won one race.
- Edaraat, bay filly, 2008, by Rahy
- Watheeq, bay colt (later gelded), 2009, by Street Cry.
- Muzu, bay colt (later gelded), 2010, by Invasor. Won one race.
- Aladeem, chestnut colt, 2012, by Street Cry

== Pedigree ==
Pedigree of Mehthaaf (USA), bay mare, 1991
Sire Nureyev (USA) 1977	Northern Dancer (CAN); 1961	Nearctic	Nearco
Sire Nureyev (USA) 1977	Northern Dancer (CAN); 1961	Nearctic	Lady Angela
Sire Nureyev (USA) 1977	Northern Dancer (CAN); 1961	Natalma	Native Dancer
Sire Nureyev (USA) 1977	Northern Dancer (CAN); 1961	Natalma	Almahmoud
Sire Nureyev (USA) 1977	Special (USA); 1969	Forli	Aristophanes
Sire Nureyev (USA) 1977	Special (USA); 1969	Forli	Trevisa
Sire Nureyev (USA) 1977	Special (USA); 1969	Thong	Nantallah
Sire Nureyev (USA) 1977	Special (USA); 1969	Thong	Rough Shod
Dam Elle Seule (USA) 1983	Exclusive Native (USA); 1965	Raise a Native	Native Dancer
Dam Elle Seule (USA) 1983	Exclusive Native (USA); 1965	Raise a Native	Raise You
Dam Elle Seule (USA) 1983	Exclusive Native (USA); 1965	Exclusive	Shut Out
Dam Elle Seule (USA) 1983	Exclusive Native (USA); 1965	Exclusive	Good Example
Dam Elle Seule (USA) 1983	Fall Aspen (USA); 1976	Pretense	Endeavour
Dam Elle Seule (USA) 1983	Fall Aspen (USA); 1976	Pretense	Imitation
Dam Elle Seule (USA) 1983	Fall Aspen (USA); 1976	Change Water	Swaps
Dam Elle Seule (USA) 1983	Fall Aspen (USA); 1976	Change Water	Portage (Family: 4-m)

- Mehthaaf was inbred 4 × 4 to Native Dancer, meaning that this stallion appears twice in the fourth generation of his pedigree.
