= Rainbow View =

American-bred Thoroughbred racehorse

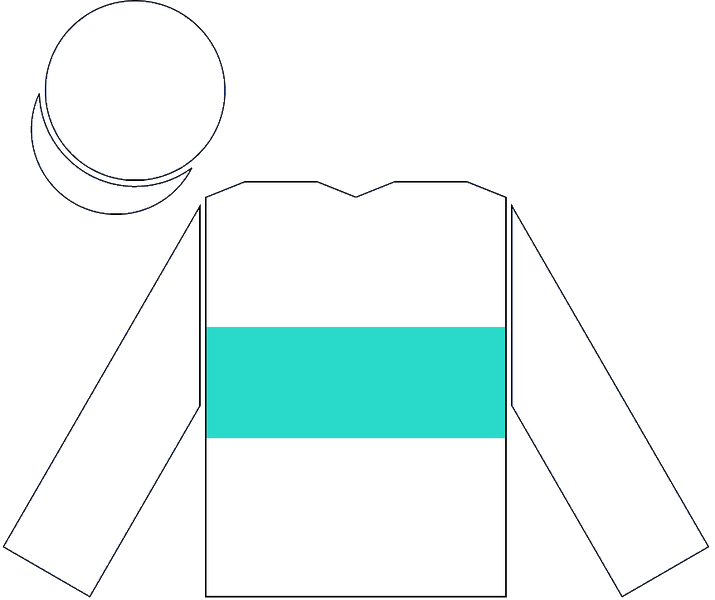
- Racing silks of George Strawbridge
- Sire: Dynaformer
- Grandsire: Roberto
- Dam: No Matter What
- Damsire: Nureyev
- Sex: Mare
- Foaled: 21 May 2006
- Country: USA
- Colour: Bay
- Breeder: Augustin Stable
- Owner: Augustin Stable
- Trainer: John Gosden; Jonathan E. Sheppard
- Record: 15: 6-2-2
- Earnings: £657,494

Major wins
- Sweet Solera Stakes (2008); May Hill Stakes (2008); Fillies' Mile (2008); Matron Stakes (2009); Gallorette Handicap (2010)

Awards
- European Champion Two-Year-Old Filly (2008)

Rainbow View (foaled 21 May 2006) is an American Thoroughbred racehorse who was trained by John Gosden to win the Fillies' Mile as a two-year-old and the Matron Stakes as a three-year-old. During her four-year-old season she was trained by Jonathan E. Sheppard and race solely in the United States.

She is the daughter of Jersey Derby winner Dynaformer and No Matter What, a daughter of Nureyev.
