= Ivanka (horse) =

Irish-bred Thoroughbred racehorse

- Sire: Dancing Brave
- Grandsire: Lyphard
- Dam: Diamond Land
- Damsire: Sparkler
- Sex: Filly
- Foaled: 5 March 1990
- Country: Ireland
- Colour: Bay
- Breeder: Stackallen Stud
- Owner: Ali Saeed
- Trainer: Clive Brittain
- Record: 5: 2-1-1
- Earnings: £143,772

Major wins
- Fillies' Mile (1992)

Ivanka (foaled 5 March 1990) was an Irish-bred British-trained Thoroughbred racehorse. As a two-year-old in 1992 she won two of her five races, taking a minor stakes race on her debut and winning the Group One Fillies' Mile in September. She also finished second in the Racing Post Trophy and third in the May Hill Stakes. She sustained a fatal training injury in late 1992.

== Background ==
Ivanka was a bay filly bred in Ireland by the Stackallen Stud. Her sire Dancing Brave was the most highly rated British racehorse of the 1980s winning a series of major races culminating in the Prix de l'Arc de Triomphe. At stud, he was a modest success, siring the Group One winners Commander in Chief, White Muzzle, Wemyss Bight and Cherokee Rose before being sold and exported to Japan in 1991. Her dam Diamond Land won one minor race in Ireland and became an influential broodmare, being the grand-dam of Yeats and the Prix Royal-Oak winner Alcazar.

As a yearling in October 1991, the filly was offered for sale at Tattersalls and was bought for 30,000 guineas by Sheikh Mohammed's Darley Stud Management. She entered the ownership of Ali Saeed was sent into training with Clive Brittain at the Carlburg Stables in Newmarket.

== Racing career ==
=== 1992: two-year-old season ===
Ivanka never contested a maiden race, beginning her racing career in the Ewar Stud Stakes over six furlongs at Newmarket Racecourse on 27 June. Ridden by the South African jockey Michael Roberts she started at odds of 3/1 against four opponents, three of whom were previous winners. Having been hampered at the start she raced at the rear of the field before taking the lead a furlong out and winning by a length and a half from the Michael Stoute-trained favourite Greenlet. Steve Cauthen took over from Roberts when the filly was stepped up in class for the Group Three Princess Margaret Stakes at Ascot Racecourse on 25 July. She was made the 7/4 favourite but after racing prominently in the early stages she finished fifth of the six runners, ten lengths behind the winner Marina Park. On 9 September Ivanka was moved up in distance for the May Hill Stakes over one mile at Doncaster Racecourse. After being restrained by Roberts in the early stages, she stayed on in the straight to finish third behind Marillette and Self Assured.

On 26 September at Ascot, Ivanka started at odds of 6/1 in an eight-runner field for the Group One Fillies' Mile. The highly regarded maiden winner Iviza started favourite ahead of the Moyglare Stud Stakes runner-up Bright Generation, the Henry Cecil-trained Magique Rond Point and the Sweet Solera Stakes winner Mystic Goddess. Ivanka, with Roberts in the saddle, tracked the leaders and turned into the straight in fourth place behind Mystic Goddess, Ajfan and Magique Rond Point. Ajfan went to the front but Ivanka took the lead a furlong and a half from the finish and won by one and a half lengths, with Iviza three lengths back in third. Four weeks after her win at Ascot, Ivanka was matched against colts in the Group One Racing Post Trophy over one mile at Doncaster. Ridden by Cauthen, she stayed on in the straight to finish second to the favourite Armiger, with the other beaten horses including Marillette and the Royal Lodge Stakes winner Desert Secret.

Before the end of the year Ivanka sustained a serious leg injury in a training gallop and was euthanised.

== Pedigree ==
Pedigree of Ivanka (IRE) bay filly 1990
Sire Dancing Brave (USA) 1983	Lyphard (USA); 1969	Northern Dancer	Nearctic
Sire Dancing Brave (USA) 1983	Lyphard (USA); 1969	Northern Dancer	Natalma
Sire Dancing Brave (USA) 1983	Lyphard (USA); 1969	Goofed	Court Martial
Sire Dancing Brave (USA) 1983	Lyphard (USA); 1969	Goofed	Barra
Sire Dancing Brave (USA) 1983	Navajo Princess (USA); 1974	Drone	Sir Gaylord
Sire Dancing Brave (USA) 1983	Navajo Princess (USA); 1974	Drone	Cap and Bells
Sire Dancing Brave (USA) 1983	Navajo Princess (USA); 1974	Olmec	Pago Pago
Sire Dancing Brave (USA) 1983	Navajo Princess (USA); 1974	Olmec	Chocolate Beau
Dam Diamond Land (GB) 1978	Sparkler (GB); 1968	Hard Tack	Hard Sauce
Dam Diamond Land (GB) 1978	Sparkler (GB); 1968	Hard Tack	Cowes
Dam Diamond Land (GB) 1978	Sparkler (GB); 1968	Diamond Spur	Preciptic
Dam Diamond Land (GB) 1978	Sparkler (GB); 1968	Diamond Spur	Diamond Princess
Dam Diamond Land (GB) 1978	Canaan (GB); 1966	Santa Claus	Chamossaire
Dam Diamond Land (GB) 1978	Canaan (GB); 1966	Santa Claus	Aunt Clara
Dam Diamond Land (GB) 1978	Canaan (GB); 1966	Rustic Bridge	Bois Roussel
Dam Diamond Land (GB) 1978	Canaan (GB); 1966	Rustic Bridge	Wyn (Family 1-m)
