= Kissing Cousins =

Kissing Cousins may refer to:

- Kissin' Cousins, a 1964 musical comedy film that stars Elvis Presley
  - Kissin' Cousins (album), a soundtrack album from the 1964 film
- Kissing Cousins (film), a 2008 American romantic comedy film
- Kissing cousins, relatives or friends with whom one is on close enough terms to greet with a kiss.
- Kissing Cousins (Full House episode), an episode of the television series Full House
- Kissing Cousins, a season 4 episode of the television series The Nanny
- Kissing Cousin, a season 10 episode of the television series Frasier
- Kissing Cousins. An Interpretation of British and American Culture, 1945-1975, a book by Daniel Snowman

== See also ==
- Kissing Cousin (horse), a Thoroughbred racehorse
- Cousin marriage
- List of coupled cousins
