= Teggiano (horse) =

Irish-bred Thoroughbred racehorse

- Sire: Mujtahid
- Grandsire: Woodman
- Dam: Tegwen
- Damsire: Nijinsky
- Sex: Mare
- Foaled: 3 March 1997
- Country: Ireland
- Colour: Bay
- Breeder: Abdullah Saeed Belhab
- Owner: Abdullah Saeed Belhab; Godolphin
- Trainer: Clive Brittain; Saeed bin Suroor
- Record: 6: 3-1-0
- Earnings: £172,267

Major wins
- May Hill Stakes (1999); Fillies' Mile (1999)

Teggiano (foaled 3 March 1997) was an Irish-bred, British-trained thoroughbred racehorse and broodmare. In a racing career which lasted from July 1999 until July 2000 she won three of her six races. As a two-year-old she was one of the best fillies of her generation in Britain when she won three races including the May Hill Stakes and the Fillies' Mile. After a change of stable she made two appearances in the following year, producing the better of her efforts when finishing second in the Ribblesdale Stakes. She has had some success as a broodmare.

== Background ==
Teggiano is a bay mare bred in Ireland by her owner Abdullah Saeed Belhab. Her sire Mujtahid raced only as a two-year-old in 1990 when he won three of his four races including the July Stakes and the Gimcrack Stakes. His other progeny included Bear King (Badener Meile), Mutakarrim (Sharp Novices' Hurdle), and Mubhij (Cornwallis Stakes). Her dam, Tegwen won one minor race from five starts as a three-year-old in 1994. and was a great-granddaughter of the broodmare Beautiful Spirit, whose other descendants have included Silvano (Arlington Million) and Sabiango (Charles Whittingham Memorial Handicap).

The filly was initially sent into training with Clive Brittain at his Carlburg Stables in Newmarket.

== Racing career ==
=== 1999: two-year-old season ===
On her racecourse debut, Teggiano was one of nine fillies to contest a maiden race over seven furlongs at Newmarket Racecourse on 25 July. Ridden by Philip Robinson, she started at odds of 8/1 and finished fourth, three lengths behind the winner Aunty Rose. Frankie Dettori took over from Robinson when the filly was dropped in distance for a six furlong maiden at Newbury Racecourse three weeks later. Starting the 5/1 third choice in a sixteen-runner field, she took the lead inside the final furlong and won by one and a half lengths and three lengths from Femme Fatale and Dancing Mirage. On 9 September, Teggiano was stepped up in class and distance for the Group Three May Hill Stakes over one mile at Doncaster Racecourse. With Dettori again in the saddle, she was made the 13/2 third favourite behind the Sweet Solera Stakes winner Princess Ellen and Aunty Rose, with the best fancied of the other nine runners being the Paul Cole-trained Sailing. Teggiano started slowly and raced at the rear of the field before being switched to the outside to make her challenge in the straight. She took the lead a furlong out, quickly went clear of her opponents and won "comfortably" by three lengths from Everlasting Love with Aunty Rose a length and a quarter away in third. Dettori commented "I liked her a lot the first time I rode her and told Clive that she had enough class to go on to the May Hill and then a Group 1 in France or England. She gave me good vibes for next year, though she is still on the weak side. She idled a bit so I gave her a couple of smacks so that she knows what's to come in better races".

Seventeen days later Teggiano was moved up in class again for the Group One Fillies' Mile at Ascot Racecourse and started the 11/8 favourite in a six-runner field after the withdrawal of the Henry Cecil-trained High Walden. Her opponents were My Hansel, Veil of Avalon, Britannia and Issey Rose, none of whom had won at Group race level. Dettori positioned the filly at the rear of the field as Britannia set the pace ahead of Issey Rose and Veil of Avalon. Teggiano began to make progress in the straight, took in the lead just inside the final furlong and won by three quarters of a length from Britannia. My Hansel was three quarters of a length away in third, a short head in front of Issey Rose. After the race Brittain said "her racing heart has won it today and it will take her to the top. Next year we'll have a racing machine".

In October it was announced that the filly would be transferred to the ownership of Goldolphin and would be removed from Clive Brittain's yard to spend the winter in Dubai. Brittain commented "It's sad that she's going, but we wish Godolphin all the very best with her and hope she does well for them".

=== 2000: three-year-old season ===
Teggiano, now trained by Saeed bin Suroor, began 2000 as the ante-post favourite for both the 1000 Guineas and The Oaks. She had several training setbacks however, including a knee injury on the flight from Dubai to England and missed the early part of the season. She eventually made an appearance in the Ribblesdale Stakes over one and a half miles at Royal Ascot on 22 June in which she was ridden by the Puerto Rican jockey John R. Velazquez and started 7/2 joint-favourite alongside the Michael Stoute-trained Interlude. After tracking the leaders she moved into second place in the straight but could make no further progress and was beaten one and a quarter lengths by Miletrian. Four weeks later the filly was sent to Ireland for the Irish Oaks at the Curragh. After racing in second place for most of the way she faded in the closing stages and finished last of the ten runners behind Petrushka.

== Breeding record ==
Teggiano was retired from racing to become a broodmare. In November 2001 she was offered for sale at Keeneland and bought for $2.1 million by Newsells Park Stud. She has produced at least eight foals and three winners:

- Theas Dance, a bay filly, foaled in 2002, sired by Danzig. Failed to win in nine races.
- Arabian Sea, bay colt, 2003, by Sadler's Wells. Failed to win in seven races.
- Minneapolis, bay colt (later gelded, 2005, by Sadler's Wells. Won three races.
- Emiratesdotcom, bay colt (later gelded), 2006, by Pivotal. Won seven races.
- Lucanin, bay colt (later gelded) by Galileo. Failed to win in five races.
- Court Pastoral, bay filly, 2010, by Mount Nelson. Won three races.
- Smooth Operator, bay colt (later gelded), 2012, by Azamour. Failed to win in three races.
- Unnamed bay filly, 2014, by Paco Boy

== Pedigree ==
Pedigree of Teggiano (IRE), bay mare, 1997
Sire Mujtahid (USA) 1980	Woodman (CAN); 1967	Mr Prospector	Raise A Native
Sire Mujtahid (USA) 1980	Woodman (CAN); 1967	Mr Prospector	Gold Digger
Sire Mujtahid (USA) 1980	Woodman (CAN); 1967	Playmate	Buckpasser
Sire Mujtahid (USA) 1980	Woodman (CAN); 1967	Playmate	Intriguing
Sire Mujtahid (USA) 1980	Mesmerize (IRE); 1982	Mill Reef	Never Bend
Sire Mujtahid (USA) 1980	Mesmerize (IRE); 1982	Mill Reef	Milan Mill
Sire Mujtahid (USA) 1980	Mesmerize (IRE); 1982	Jeanie Duff	Majestic Prince
Sire Mujtahid (USA) 1980	Mesmerize (IRE); 1982	Jeanie Duff	Turf
Dam Tegwen (GB) 1986	Nijinsky (CAN); 1967	Northern Dancer	Nearctic
Dam Tegwen (GB) 1986	Nijinsky (CAN); 1967	Northern Dancer	Natalma
Dam Tegwen (GB) 1986	Nijinsky (CAN); 1967	Flaming Page	Bull Page
Dam Tegwen (GB) 1986	Nijinsky (CAN); 1967	Flaming Page	Flaring Top
Dam Tegwen (GB) 1986	Beautiful Aly (USA); 1986	Alydar	Raise A Native
Dam Tegwen (GB) 1986	Beautiful Aly (USA); 1986	Alydar	Sweet Tooth
Dam Tegwen (GB) 1986	Beautiful Aly (USA); 1986	Beautiful Glass	Pass the Glass
Dam Tegwen (GB) 1986	Beautiful Aly (USA); 1986	Beautiful Glass	Beautiful Spirit (Family: 1-c)

- Teggiano was inbred 4 × 4 to Raise A Native, meaning that this stallion appears twice in the fourth generation of her pedigree.
