= Fair Grounds Stakes =

- Class: Grade III
- Location: Fair Grounds Race Course; New Orleans, Louisiana, United States
- Inaugurated: 1988 (as Fair Grounds Budweiser Breeders' Cup)
- Race type: Thoroughbred – Flat racing
- Website: Fair Grounds

Race information
- Distance: 1 1/8 miles
- Surface: Turf
- Track: left-handed
- Qualification: Four-years-old & older
- Weight: 124 lbs with allowances
- Purse: $175,000 (since 2024)

The Fair Grounds Stakes is a Grade III American Thoroughbred horse race for four-year-olds and older run over a distance of about 1 1/8 miles (9 furlongs) on the turf annually in mid-February at the Fair Grounds Race Course in New Orleans, Louisiana. It currently offers a purse of $175,000.

== History ==
The event was inaugurated on 21 February 1988 as the featured tenth race called the Fair Grounds Budweiser Breeders' Cup with sponsorship from Budweiser and the Breeders' Cup with handicap conditions for three-year-olds and older at the distance of about one and one-eighth miles. The event was won by the Irish bred five-year-old Top Guest in a time of 1:54 1/5. Top Guest had previously won the Stockholm Cup International as a three-year-old.

Budweiser ceased their sponsorship in 1995 while the Breeders' Cup continued until 2006.

The event was upgraded in 2006 to Grade III. That same year, 2006, the event was moved to Louisiana Downs due to the after effects of Hurricane Katrina which damaged the Fair Grounds racetrack.

Two horses have won the event three times. Yukon Gold won the event three consecutive times for in 1993 through 1995. Yukon Gold's third victory was on dirt since the event was moved off the turf. Mystery Giver also won the race three times, in 2002 through 2004.

Originally a handicap, in 2020 the conditions of the event were changed to a stakes allowance race, thus changing the name of the event to Fair Grounds Stakes.

The event has been held in mid-February since 2010 as is part of Louisiana Derby Preview Day at the New Orleans racetrack.

== Records ==
Speed record:

- 1 1/8 miles – 1:47.29 Factor This (2020)

Margins:

- 5 1/2 lengths – Joyeux Danseur (1998)

Most wins:

- 3 - Yukon Gold (1993, 1994, 1995)
- 3 - Mystery Giver (2002, 2003, 2004)

Most wins by a jockey:

- 5 - Robby Albarado (1997, 1998, 2003, 2004, 2006)

Most wins by a trainer:

- 3 - Hal Wiggins (1993, 1994, 1995)
- 3 - Richard R. Scherer (2002, 2003, 2004)
- 3 - Brad H. Cox (2015, 2016, 2020)

Most wins by an owner:

- 4 - Team Block (2002, 2003, 2004, 2006)

== Winners ==
Year	Winner	Age	Jockey	Trainer	Owner	Distance	Time	Purse	Grade	Ref
At Fair Grounds – Fair Grounds Stakes
2026	Lagynos	5	Jose L. Ortiz	Steven M. Asmussen	HRH Prince Sultan Bin Mishal Al Saud	1 1/8 miles	1:48.02	$175,000	III	
2025	Taking Candy	5	Irad Ortiz Jr.	Cherie DeVaux	Lael Stables	1 1/8 miles	1:50.44	$175,000	III	
2024	Beatbox	6	Joel Rosario	Cherie DeVaux	Rob Comestro & Jeff Ganje	1 1/8 miles	1:49.96	$175,000	III	
2023	Two Emmys	7	James Graham	Hugh H. Robertson	Wolfe Racing & Hugh H. Robertson	abt. 1 1/8 miles	1:54.73	$145,500	III	
2022	Cavalry Charge	5	Brian Hernandez Jr.	Dallas Stewart	West Point Thoroughbreds, William Sandbrook & Robert Masiello	abt. 1 1/8 miles	1:53.06	$150,000	III	
2021	Captivating Moon	5	Marcelino Pedroza	Chris Block	Lothenbach Stables	1 1/8 miles	1:50.27	$150,000	III	
2020	Factor This	5	Shaun Bridgmohan	Brad H. Cox	Gaining Ground Racing	1 1/8 miles	1:47.29	$150,000	III	
Fair Grounds Handicap
2019	Synchrony	6	Joe Bravo	Michael Stidham	Pin Oak Stable	abt. 1 1/8 miles	1:48.09	$150,000	III	
2018	Synchrony	5	Joe Bravo	Michael Stidham	Pin Oak Stable	abt. 1 1/8 miles	1:48.82	$150,000	III	
2017	Enterprising	6	Julien R. Leparoux	Michael J. Maker	Maxis Stable	abt. 1 1/8 miles	1:48.80	$122,500	III	
2016	Chocolate Ride	6	Florent Geroux	Brad H. Cox	Wentworth Brochu	abt. 1 1/8 miles	1:49.31	$125,000	III	
2015	Chocolate Ride	5	Florent Geroux	Brad H. Cox	John Wentworth	abt. 1 1/8 miles	1:48.84	$125,000	III	
2014	Potomac River	5	Juan P. Vargas	Jose M. Camejo	Maribel Ruelas	abt. 1 1/8 miles	1:50.52	$147,000	III	
2013	Optimizer	4	Jon Court	D. Wayne Lukas	Calumet Farm	abt. 1 1/8 miles	1:56.06	$145,500	III	
2012	Smart Bid	6	Edgar S. Prado	H. Graham Motion	Augustin Stable	abt. 1 1/8 miles	1:51.91	$122,500	III	
2011	Expansion	6	Gerard Melancon	Steven M. Asmussen	Millennium Farms & Mike McCarty	abt. 1 1/8 miles	1:54.94	$125,000	III	
2010	Blues Street	6	Javier Castellano	Todd A. Pletcher	Anstu Stables	abt. 1 1/8 miles	1:51.71	$100,000	III	
2009	Diamond Tycoon	5	Julien R. Leparoux	Andrew McKeever	Charlotte Musgrave	abt. 1 1/8 miles	1:52.12	$125,000	III	
2008	Daytona (IRE)	4	Mike E. Smith	Dan L. Hendricks	Jeff Davenport, Tom Lenner, Jess Ravich & Thomas W. Murray	abt. 1 1/8 miles	1:50.09	$140,000	III	
2007	Cloudy's Knight	7	Ramsey Zimmerman	James R. McMullen	S J Stables	abt. 1 1/8 miles	1:49.48	$198,500	III	
At Louisiana Downs
2006	Fort Prado	6	Robby Albarado	Jeff Trosclair	Team Block	1 1/16 miles	1:43.16	$189,800	III	
At Fair Grounds
2005	G P Fleet	5	Jose R. Martinez Jr.	Steven B. Flint	Richard, Bertram & Elaine Klein	abt. 1 1/8 miles	1:53.79	$125,000	Listed	
2004	Mystery Giver	6	Robby Albarado	Richard R. Scherer	Team Block	abt. 1 1/8 miles	1:51.77	$119,500	Listed	
2003	Mystery Giver	5	Robby Albarado	Richard R. Scherer	Team Block	abt. 1 1/8 miles	1:50.41	$150,000	Listed	
2002	Mystery Giver	4	Eddie Martin Jr.	Richard R. Scherer	Team Block	abt. 1 1/8 miles	1:50.13	$147,000	Listed	
2001	Candid Glen	4	Elvis Joseph Perrodin	Andrew Leggio Jr.	Glen C. Warren	abt. 1 1/8 miles	1:54.03	$154,349	Listed	
2000	Profit Option	5	Lonnie Meche	Kenneth E. Hoffman	Team Canonie, M. Conway & K. Hoffman	abt. 1 1/8 miles	1:52.52	$159,100	Listed	
1999	Aboriginal Apex	6	Larry Melancon	Niall M. O'Callaghan	Gary B. Knapp	abt. 1 1/8 miles	1:51.71	$150,000	Listed	
1998	Joyeux Danseur	5	Robby Albarado	Albert Stall Jr.	B. Wayne Hughes	abt. 1 1/8 miles	1:50.60	$125,000	Listed	
1997	Snake Eyes	7	Robby Albarado	Walter M. Bindner Jr.	Marco Bommarito	abt. 1 1/8 miles	1:52.65	$147,470	Listed	
1996	Born Wild	4	Mickey Walls	Daniel J. Vella	Frank H. Stronach	abt. 1 1/8 miles	1:52.97	$102,325	Listed	
1995	Yukon Robbery	6	Ricky Faul	Hal Wiggins	Thomas C. Mueller	1 1/8 miles	1:51.50	$101,975	Listed	
1994	Yukon Robbery	5	Ricky Faul	Hal Wiggins	Thomas C. Mueller	abt. 1 1/8 miles	1:50.27	$98,225	Listed	
1993	Yukon Robbery	4	Ricky Faul	Hal Wiggins	Thomas C. Mueller	abt. 1 1/8 miles	1:50.60	$77,400		
1992	Rainbows for Life (CAN)	4	Shane Romero	James Day	Sam-Son Farm	abt. 1 1/8 miles	1:53.00	$77,800		
1991	First Tea	4	Kenneth Bourque	Paul H. Murphy	David J. Hulkewicz	abt. 1 1/8 miles	1:53.30	$77,500		
1990	Tower Above 'Em	6	Shane Romero	Joseph Y. Soileau	James Cassels	abt. 1 1/8 miles	1:55.80	$75,575		
1989	Ingot's Ruler	7	Ronald Ardoin	Tommie T. Morgan	Mildred Fike	abt. 1 1/8 miles	1:51.20	$75,000		
1988	Top Guest (IRE)	5	Jean-Luc Samyn	Timothy A. Koons	Dogwood Stable	abt. 1 1/8 miles	1:54.20	$65,000		

Legend:
Dirt Turf

== See also ==
- List of American and Canadian Graded races
