= Sea Chimes =

Irish-bred Thoroughbred racehorse

- Sire: Gulf Pearl
- Grandsire: Persian Gulf
- Dam: Canterbury Belle
- Damsire: St Alphage
- Sex: Stallion
- Foaled: 8 March 1976
- Country: Ireland
- Colour: Chestnut
- Breeder: Ballykisteen Stud
- Owner: John Thursby; Dogwood Stable
- Trainer: John Dunlop; F Alexander; Gerald Rich
- Record: 28: 8-1-3

Major wins
- King George V Stakes (1979); City and Suburban Handicap (1980); Clive Graham Stakes (1980); Coronation Cup (1980)

Awards
- Timeform rating 83 (1978), 112 (1979), 123 (1980),

Sea Chimes (foaled 8 March 1976) was an Irish-bred Thoroughbred racehorse and sire. Originally trained in the United Kingdom, he was beaten in all four of his races as a juvenile in 1978 and lost on his three-year-old debut. He won his four remaining races in 1979 including the King George V Stakes. In 1980 he took his winning sequence to eight with wins in the City and Suburban Handicap, Doncaster Spring Handicap, Clive Graham Stakes and Coronation Cup. He never won again, losing both his starts in Britain in 1981 and failing to win in twelve races after being transferred to the United States. He made no impact at stud and died in 1984.

== Background ==
Sea Chimes was a "tall, lengthy" chestnut horse with a small white star bred in Ireland by the County Tipperary-based Ballykisteen Stud. His sire, Gulf Pearl, won the Imperial Stakes in 1964 and the Chester Vase in 1965: he also sired the outstanding sprinter Deep Diver. His dam, Canterbury Belle finished unplaced on her only racecourse appearance over seven furlongs at Goodwood Racecourse in May 1974. She was a granddaughter of Miss Stephen the dam of both Deep Diver and the Irish 2,000 Guineas winner King's Company.

As a yearling Sea Chimes was put up for auction and was bought 8,600 guineas. He entered the ownership of John Thursby and was sent into training with John Dunlop at Arundel, West Sussex.

== Racing career ==
=== 1978–1979: early career ===
Sea Chimes finished unplaced in his first three starts as a two-year-old in 1978, racing over six furlongs on each occasion. He was moved up in distance for a maiden race over one mile at Sandown Park Racecourse in October and showed improved form, staying on strongly in the closing stages to finish third of the twenty runners behind Red Rufus.

In 1979 Sea Chimes finished third on his seasonal debut but then made rapid improvement when competing in handicap races. He won twice at Newmarket Racecourse over ten furlongs and once over the same distance at Epsom. He was then moved up in distance for the King George V Stakes at Royal Ascot in June and "romped home" by six lengths from Barley Hill. He subsequently contracted a viral infection and missed the rest of the season.

=== 1980: four-year-old season ===
After an absence of almost ten months, Sea Chimes returned in the City and Suburban Handicap at Epsom in April. Carrying top weight of 140 pounds he recorded his fifth successive victory as he won by three lengths from Joleg. He extended his winning streak by beating Red Rufus and King's Ride in the Spring Handicap at Doncaster and was then moved into weight-for-age company for the Clive Graham takes at Kempton Park Racecourse. Sea Chimes produced an impressive performance as he quickened away from his rivals in the closing stages to win by four lengths from New Berry.

In June Sea Chimes was made the 5/4 favourite for the 75th running of the Coronation Cup at Epsom. His three opponents were Niniski, Soleil Noir (Grand Prix de Paris) and Valour (Grosser Preis von Baden). Ridden by Lester Piggott he took the lead from the start and kicked clear of his rivals in the straight to win by two and a half lengths from Niniski. A month later, Sea Chimes was brought back in distance for the Eclipse Stakes over ten furlongs at Sandown Park Racecourse in which he was ridden by Pat Eddery. After disputing the lead for most of the way he faded in the straight and finished fourth behind Ela-Mana-Mou, Hello Gorgeous and Gregorian. He sustained a leg injury in the race and did not run again in 1980. Shortly before the Eclipse Stakes, a half-share in the horse had been bought by the American Dogwood Stable.

=== 1981–1982: later career ===
Sea Chimes remained in training with Dunlop in the early part of 1981 but ran poorly in his first two races, finishing fourth behind Pelerin in the Ormonde Stakes and last of the ten runners in the Prince of Wales's Stakes at Royal Ascot in June. He was then transferred to race in the United States where he raced five times before the end of the season producing his best effort when finishing a close third to Spruce Needles in the Arlington Handicap.

In 1982 Sea Chimes was trained by Gerald Rich in the United States but failed to win or finish better than fourth in seven races.

== Assessment ==
In 1978 the independent Timeform organisation gave Sea Chimes a rating of 83 and commented in their annual Racehorses of 1978 that he was "sure to win a race". In the following year Timeform rated him at 112 and noted his "turn of foot" (acceleration) and ability to perform on any going. Sea Chimes was rated 123 by Timeform in 1980 and in their annual Racehorses of 1980 they described him as "an admirable racehorse" and "a credit to his trainer". In the official International Classification he was given a rating of 82, ten pounds behind the leading older horse Ela-Mana Mou.

== Stud record ==
Sea Chimes was retired from racing and became a breeding stallion in the United States. He sired no winners of any consequence and died in 1984.

== Pedigree ==
Pedigree of Sea Chimes (IRE), chestnut stallion 1976
Sire Gulf Pearl (GB) 1962	Persian Gulf (GB); 1940	Bahram	Blandford
Sire Gulf Pearl (GB) 1962	Persian Gulf (GB); 1940	Bahram	Friar's Daughter
Sire Gulf Pearl (GB) 1962	Persian Gulf (GB); 1940	Double Life	Bachelor's Double
Sire Gulf Pearl (GB) 1962	Persian Gulf (GB); 1940	Double Life	Saint Joan
Sire Gulf Pearl (GB) 1962	Nan (GB); 1955	Nearco*	Pharos*
Sire Gulf Pearl (GB) 1962	Nan (GB); 1955	Nearco*	Nogara*
Sire Gulf Pearl (GB) 1962	Nan (GB); 1955	Maryaka	Marsyas
Sire Gulf Pearl (GB) 1962	Nan (GB); 1955	Maryaka	Nokka
Dam Canterbury Belle (IRE) 1971	St Alphage (GB); 1963	Red God	Nasrullah*
Dam Canterbury Belle (IRE) 1971	St Alphage (GB); 1963	Red God	Spring Run
Dam Canterbury Belle (IRE) 1971	St Alphage (GB); 1963	Sally Deans	Fun Fair
Dam Canterbury Belle (IRE) 1971	St Alphage (GB); 1963	Sally Deans	Cora Deans
Dam Canterbury Belle (IRE) 1971	Palamina (GB); 1962	Pall Mall	Palestine
Dam Canterbury Belle (IRE) 1971	Palamina (GB); 1962	Pall Mall	Malapert
Dam Canterbury Belle (IRE) 1971	Palamina (GB); 1962	Miss Stephen	Stephen Paul
Dam Canterbury Belle (IRE) 1971	Palamina (GB); 1962	Miss Stephen	Bright Set (Family: 13-e)

* Sea Chimes is inbred 3S x 5D to the stallion Nearco, meaning that he appears third generation on the sire side of his pedigree, and fifth generation (via Nasrullah) on the dam side of his pedigree.
