= Mystery Giver =

American-bred Thoroughbred racehorse

- Sire: Dynaformer
- Grandsire: Roberto
- Dam: Ioya
- Damsire: Naskra
- Sex: Gelding
- Foaled: 1998
- Country: United States
- Colour: Bay
- Breeder: Patricia & David Block
- Owner: Team Block
- Trainer: Richard R. Scherer
- Record: 43: 13-8-3
- Earnings: US$1,244,715

Major wins
- Sea o'Erin Breeders' Cup Handicap (2002); Arlington Cardinal Handicap (2002); Fair Grounds Handicap (2002, 2003, 2004); Robert F. Carey Memorial Handicap (2003); Mervin H. Muniz Jr. Memorial Handicap (2004)

Awards
- Illinois Horse of the Year (2002)

Mystery Giver (foaled April 29, 1998 in Illinois) is a retired American Thoroughbred racehorse best known for winning three consecutive editions of the Fair Grounds Handicap at the Fair Grounds Race Course in New Orleans, Louisiana. Trained by longtime trainer Richard Scherer, Mystery Giver set the track record at the Fair Grounds in the Mervin H. Muniz Jr. Memorial Handicap. Scherer continues to race horses at the Fair Grounds during the winter, while spending the rest of the year in Chicago at Arlington Park and Hawthorne Race Course.
