= White Moonstone =

American-bred Thoroughbred racehorse

- Sire: Dynaformer
- Grandsire: Roberto
- Dam: Desert Gold
- Damsire: Seeking The Gold
- Sex: Mare
- Foaled: 25 February 2008
- Country: United States
- Colour: Bay
- Breeder: Stonerside Stable
- Owner: Godolphin
- Trainer: Saeed bin Suroor
- Record: 4: 4-0-0
- Earnings: £197,711

Major wins
- Sweet Solera Stakes (2010); May Hill Stakes (2010); Fillies' Mile (2010)

White Moonstone (foaled 25 February 2008) is an American-bred, British-trained Thoroughbred racehorse and broodmare. In a racing career which lasted from July until October 2010 she was undefeated in four races of increasing importance. After winning a maiden race on her debut she won the Group Three Sweet Solera Stakes, the Group Two May Hill Stakes and the Group One Fillies' Mile. She suffered training problems in the early part of the following year and was retired without racing again. She has produced at least one foal.

== Background ==
White Moonstone is a bay mare with no white markings bred by the Paris, Kentucky-based Stonerside Stable. She was sired by the American stallion Dynaformer whose wins included the Jersey Derby and whose other progeny have included Barbaro, Americain, Blue Bunting and Lucarno. Her dam, Desert Gold was a daughter of Desert Stormette, a half-sister of Desert Stormer (Breeders' Cup Sprint). Desert Stormette was in turn a granddaughter of the broodmare New Tune, whose other offspring included the Queen's Plate winner Sound Reason.

In September 2008, Stonerside Stable was bought by Sheikh Mohammed's Darley Stud. White Moonstone was sent to Europe where she was trained by Saeed bin Suroor and raced in the colours of Godolphin Racing. She was ridden in all of her races Frankie Dettori.

== Racing career ==
=== 2010: two-year-old season ===
White Moonstone began her racing career in a six furlong maiden race at Ascot Racecourse on 23 July and started at odds of 15/2 against ten other fillies. After racing wide on the final (right-handed) turn she tracked left to race up the stands-side rail, took the lead inside the final furlong and drew away to win by one and a quarter lengths from the favourite Florestans Match. Two weeks later she was moved up in class and distance for the Group Three Sweet Solera Stakes over seven furlongs at Newmarket Racecourse and started 11/4 joint-favourite alongside the Empress Stakes winner Khor Sheed. She started slowly and raced at the rear of the nine runner field before taking the lead a furlong out and won "comfortably" by a length and a quarter from Crying Lightening despite hanging left in the closing stages. Dettori commented "She drifted to the left but that is just immaturity. I thought I was in trouble three out but she soon came back on the bridle and quickened really well when I asked".

On September 10 White Moonstone was stepped up in class and distance again and started 8/11 favourite for the Group Two May Hill Stakes at Doncaster Racecourse. The best fancied of her six opponents were the John Gosden-trained maiden winner Midnight Caller and the Star Stakes winner Lily Again. After being restrained by Dettori in the early stages she began to make progress in last quarter mile. She moved into the lead and quickly went clear to win "easily" by five lengths from the 66/1 outsider Al Madina. After the race the filly was made 7/1 favourite for the following year's 1000 Guineas. Saeed bin Suroor said "I like her. She's got plenty of speed and she worked very well in her last piece of work. She's sound and happy and I'd like to go for a Group 1 with her. We've always liked her she's got class and is a big strong filly" whilst Dettori described the winner as being "like a super model - she's tall, skinny and beautiful".

On her final appearance White Moonstone was one of five fillies to contest the Group One Fillies' Mile at Ascot Racecourse on 25 September. She started the 4/5 favourite ahead of the Prestige Stakes winner Theysken's Theory and the Silver Flash Stakes winner Together whilst the two outsiders were Fork Handles (unplaced behind White Moonstone at Newmarket) and the maiden Traffic Sister. The favourite raced in last place as Fork Handles set the pace before giving way to Theysken's Theory in the straight. White Moonstoned took the lead inside the final furlong and held off the late challenge of Together to win by a neck. Commenting on the filly's performance, Dettori said "I don't think she ran as good as she did at Doncaster. Her turn of foot wasn't as good and the race came a bit quick, but to win like that is still very pleasing" but added "she is quite light-framed and I don't think she'll take much more racing".

=== 2011: three-year-old season ===
White Moonstone returned to England in the spring of 2011 to begin serious training for the 1000 Guineas. Eight days before the race she was found to be "stiff" after a training gallop and was withdrawn from the race. Godolphin's racing manager commented "Unfortunately, White Moonstone is not right and we need to find the cause of the problem". The filly never raced again and was retired from racing at the end of the year.

== Breeding record ==
After her retirement from racing, White Moonstone became a broodmare for Darley Stud. Her first foal, a filly sired by Dubawi was born in February 2013.

== Pedigree ==
Pedigree of White Moonstone (USA), bay mare, 2008
Sire Dynaformer (USA) 1985	Roberto (USA); 1969	Hail to Reason	Turn-To
Sire Dynaformer (USA) 1985	Roberto (USA); 1969	Hail to Reason	Nothirdchance
Sire Dynaformer (USA) 1985	Roberto (USA); 1969	Bramalea	Nashua
Sire Dynaformer (USA) 1985	Roberto (USA); 1969	Bramalea	Rarelea
Sire Dynaformer (USA) 1985	Andover Way (USA); 1978	His Majesty	Ribot
Sire Dynaformer (USA) 1985	Andover Way (USA); 1978	His Majesty	Flower Bowl
Sire Dynaformer (USA) 1985	Andover Way (USA); 1978	On The Trail	Olympia
Sire Dynaformer (USA) 1985	Andover Way (USA); 1978	On The Trail	Golden Trail
Dam Desert Gold (USA) 1999	Seeking The Gold (USA); 1985	Mr Prospector	Raise A Native
Dam Desert Gold (USA) 1999	Seeking The Gold (USA); 1985	Mr Prospector	Gold Digger
Dam Desert Gold (USA) 1999	Seeking The Gold (USA); 1985	Con Game	Buckpasser
Dam Desert Gold (USA) 1999	Seeking The Gold (USA); 1985	Con Game	Broadway
Dam Desert Gold (USA) 1999	Desert Stormette (FR); 1991	Storm Cat	Storm Bird
Dam Desert Gold (USA) 1999	Desert Stormette (FR); 1991	Storm Cat	Terlingua
Dam Desert Gold (USA) 1999	Desert Stormette (FR); 1991	Breezy Stories	Damascus
Dam Desert Gold (USA) 1999	Desert Stormette (FR); 1991	Breezy Stories	New Tune (Family:21-a)
