= Kissing Cousin (horse) =

Irish-bred Thoroughbred racehorse

- Sire: Danehill
- Grandsire: Danzig
- Dam: First Kiss
- Damsire: Kris
- Sex: Mare
- Foaled: 1 April 1991
- Country: Ireland
- Colour: Bay
- Breeder: Sheikh Mohammed
- Owner: Sheikh Mohammed
- Trainer: Henry Cecil
- Record: 10: 4-1-1
- Earnings: £163,417

Major wins
- Coronation Stakes (1994)

Kissing Cousin (foaled 1 April 1991) was an Irish-bred, British-trained Thoroughbred racehorse and broodmare. As a two-year-old she showed progressive form, winning two minor races before finishing second in the May Hill Stakes and third in the Fillies' Mile. In the following year she ran poorly on her seasonal debut but won then won a minor stakes race before ending her racing career with a win in the Coronation Stakes at Royal Ascot. She was then retired from racing. She had little success as a broodmare, producing only two minor winners.

== Background ==
Kissing Cousin was a bay mare with a small white star and a white sock on her left hind leg bred in Ireland by her owner Sheikh Mohammed. She was from the first crop of foals sired by Danehill a sprinter who won the Cork and Orrery Stakes and the Haydock Sprint Cup in 1989. Danehill went on to become and exceptionally successful breeding stallion producing the winners of more than a thousand races, including one hundred and fifty-six at Group One/Grade I level. Among his best offspring are Duke of Marmalade, Dylan Thomas, Rock of Gibraltar, George Washington and North Light. Her dam First Kiss won two minor races as a three-year-old in 1986 and was the granddaughter of Pistol Packer, a leading racemare who won the Prix de Diane and finished second in the Prix de l'Arc de Triomphe. She was also a distant relative of Noblesse who won The Oaks and later became an influential broodmare.

The filly was sent into training with Henry Cecil at his Warren Place stable in Newmarket, Suffolk.

== Racing career ==
=== 1993: two-year-old season ===
As a two-year-old, Kissing Cousin showed little early promise, finishing unplaced in maiden races at Newbury in May and Nottingham in June. In July, she recorded her first success when winning a six furlong maiden at Haydock Park Racecourse and followed up two weeks later in a minor race at Thirsk winning by six lengths at odds of 4/6. On her next appearance, the filly was moved up in class and distance for the Group Three May Hill Stakes over one mile at Doncaster Racecourse on 9 September. Ridden by Michael Roberts, she started the 5/2 joint-favourite and led for most of the way before being overtaken in the final furlong and was beaten two lengths into second place by the Michael Stoute trained Hawajiss. Later in the month she was moved up to the highest class for the Group One Fillies' Mile at Ascot Racecourse and started the 7/1 third favourite in the eleven-runner field. Roberts again sent her into the lead from the start and she maintained her advantage until the final furlong when she was overtaken and finished third behind Fairy Heights and Dance To The Top. The tactics were repeated when Kissing Cousin ended her season in the Rockfel Stakes at Newmarket Racecourse in October. She led till the last quarter mile but tired in the closing stages to finish sixth of the nine runners behind the Luca Cumani-trained Relatively Special.

=== 1994: three-year-old season ===
Kissing Cousin made her first appearance as a three-year-old in the seven furlong Fred Darling Stakes (a trial race for the 1000 Guineas) at Newbury on 15 April. Ridden for the first time by Mick Kinane she raced in second before fading in the last quarter mile and finished last of the seven runners behind Bulaxie. The filly missed the 1000 Guineas and reappeared in a minor stakes race at Leicester Racecourse on 23 May in which she was ridden by Willie Ryan. Starting at odds of 3/1 in a four-runner field she took the lead from the start and drew away in the last quarter mile and drew away in the last two furlongs to win by twenty lengths from Miss Kristin.

On 15 June, Kissing Cousin was moved back up to Group One class for the 145th running of the Coronation Stakes over one mile at Royal Ascot. With Kinane in the saddle, she started at odds of 13/2 (having been backed down from 20/1 on the morning of the race) in a nine-runner field, with the 1000 Guineas winner Las Meninas being made the 9/4 favourite. The other contenders included Relatively Special, Mehthaaf (Irish 1,000 Guineas), Lemon Souffle, Prophecy and the unbeaten Zafaaf. Kinane sent the filly into the lead from the start and she maintained her advantage into the straight ahead of Lemon Souffle and the French-trained outsider Eternal Reve. In the final furlong Kissing Cousin was strongly challenged by Eternal Reve but ran on "gamely" to win by a short head, with Mehthaaf two and a half lengths back in third ahead of Lemon Souffle. After the race Henry Cecil commented "She's very genuine but she just has her days. I told Sheikh Mohammed that she would either win or finish last. I haven't worked out any plans for her, but at least she's won a Group One, even if she never wins anything else".

Kissing Cousin never raced again and was retired at the end of the year.

== Breeding record ==
After her retirement from racing, Kissing Cousin became a broodmare for her owner's Darley Stud. She produced at least five foals and two minor winners between 1996 and 2001:

- Greetings, a bay filly, foaled in 1996, sired by Rainbow Quest. Unraced.
- Patruel, bay filly, 1997, by Rainbow Quest. Won one race.
- Kissinger, colt, 1998, by Nashwan. Unraced.
- Realism, bay colt (later gelded), 2000, by Machiavellian. Won ten flat races and one hurdle race.
- Houbara, dark bay or brown colt (later gelded), 2001, by Octagonal. Failed to win in five races.

== Pedigree ==
Pedigree of Kissing Cousin (IRE), bay mare, 1991
Sire Danehill (USA) 1986	Danzig (USA); 1977	Northern Dancer	Nearctic
Sire Danehill (USA) 1986	Danzig (USA); 1977	Northern Dancer	Natalma*
Sire Danehill (USA) 1986	Danzig (USA); 1977	Pas de Nom	Admiral's Voyage
Sire Danehill (USA) 1986	Danzig (USA); 1977	Pas de Nom	Petitioner
Sire Danehill (USA) 1986	Rayzana (USA); 1981	His Majesty	Ribot
Sire Danehill (USA) 1986	Rayzana (USA); 1981	His Majesty	Flower Bowl
Sire Danehill (USA) 1986	Rayzana (USA); 1981	Spring Adieu	Buckpasser
Sire Danehill (USA) 1986	Rayzana (USA); 1981	Spring Adieu	Natalma*
Dam First Kiss (GB) 1983	Kris (GB); 1976	Sharpen Up	Atan
Dam First Kiss (GB) 1983	Kris (GB); 1976	Sharpen Up	Rocchetta
Dam First Kiss (GB) 1983	Kris (GB); 1976	Doubly Sure	Reliance
Dam First Kiss (GB) 1983	Kris (GB); 1976	Doubly Sure	Soft Angels
Dam First Kiss (GB) 1983	Primatie (FR); 1975	Vaguely Noble	Vienna
Dam First Kiss (GB) 1983	Primatie (FR); 1975	Vaguely Noble	Noble Lassie
Dam First Kiss (GB) 1983	Primatie (FR); 1975	Pistol Packer	Gun Bow
Dam First Kiss (GB) 1983	Primatie (FR); 1975	Pistol Packer	George's Girl (Family: 14-f)

- Like all of Danehill's offspring Kissing Cousin is inbred 4 × 4 to the mare Natalma. This means that she occurs twice in the fourth generation of his pedigree.
