= Lyric of Light =

British-bred Thoroughbred racehorse

- Sire: Street Cry
- Grandsire: Machiavellian
- Dam: Suez
- Damsire: Green Desert
- Sex: Mare
- Foaled: 1 March 2009
- Country: United Kingdom
- Colour: Bay
- Breeder: Darley
- Owner: Godolphin
- Trainer: Mahmood Al Zarooni
- Record: 4: 3-0-0
- Earnings: £136,946

Major wins
- May Hill Stakes (2011); Fillies' Mile (2011)

Lyric of Light (foaled 1 March 2009) is a British Thoroughbred racehorse and broodmare. She was one of the best two-year-old fillies of her generation in Britain in 2011 when she was unbeaten in three races of increasing importance. After winning a minor race on her debut, she won the Group Two May Hill Stakes and the Group One Fillies' Mile. In the following spring she finished last when fancied for the 1000 Guineas after which she failed a drug test. She never raced again, retiring at the end of that year.

== Background ==
Lyric of Light is a bay mare with a white star and snip and three white socks bred in the United Kingdom by Sheikh Mohammed's Darley. Her sire, Street Cry was a top-class performer on dirt who won the Dubai World Cup in 2002 before becoming a very successful breeding stallion. His other progeny included Zenyatta, Street Sense, Shocking, Whobegotyou and Winx. Her dam Suez showed good form in a brief racing career, winning the Dick Poole Fillies' Stakes and finishing second in the Cheveley Park Stakes from three starts in 2004. She was a granddaughter of Reprocolor, a broodmare whose other descendants have included Opera House and Kayf Tara.

During her racing career, Lyric of Light raced in the colours of Godolphin and was trained by Mahmood Al Zarooni.

== Racing career ==
=== 2011: two-year-old season ===
On her first racecourse appearance, Lyric of Light was ridden by Mickael Barzalona when she was one of eleven fillies to contest a maiden race over seven furlongs at Newmarket Racecourse on 26 August. Starting at odds of 6/1 she tracked the leaders before taking the lead approaching the final furlong and won by three quarters of a length from Diala with the favourite Shada in third. Two weeks later the filly was moved up in class and distance for the Group Two May Hill Stakes over one mile at Doncaster Racecourse, with Frankie Dettori taking over from Barzalona. She was made the 9/1 fourth choice in the betting behind Fallen For You, Regal Realm (winner of the Prestige Stakes) and Samitar (Albany Stakes). She was held up towards the rear of the eight-runner field before beginning to make progress three furlongs from the finish. Lyric of Light took the lead a furlong out but hung to the right in the closing stages before staying on to win by a neck from Fallen For You. The racecourse stewards held an inquiry into possible interference between the winner and the runner-up but allowed the result to stand. After the race Dettori commented "She's only run the once and there was a big crowd here today. When I went for her she went right and I tried to steer her as much as I could without interfering with [William Buick on Fallen For You]. She's got a lot of class and won with her ears pricked. Mahmood's liked her and this was a big jump from her maiden, but the signs are she's good filly". Zarooni stated that the filly would be moved up to Group One level for her next start mentioning the Prix Marcel Boussac and the Fillies' Mile as likely targets.

Lyric of Light made her third and final appearance of the season in the Group One Fillies' Mile on good to firm ground at Newmarket on 23 September. With Dettori again in the saddle she was made the 2/1 favourite with Fallen For You and the Roger Varian-trained Firdaws joint-second choices on 3/1 and Samitar being the best-fancied of the other five runners. Samitar went to the front from the tart with Lyric of Light, as at Doncaster, being held up at the back of the field before beginning to make ground just after half way. The favourite moved alongside Samitar a furlong out and the pair drew away from the opposition, with Lyric of Light gaining the advantage in the final strides to win by a head. Firdaws was four and a half length back in third, just ahead of the outsider Salford Act. Zarooni commented "I don't think she liked the ground – Frankie felt she wasn't happy on it and it was only because she is a good filly that she won." Dettori, who celebrated with a flying dismount, said "She's a superstar of a filly and only does what she has to do. She got very unbalanced coming down into the dip, but I managed to collar Jamie (Spencer) in the last 50 yards. I had a good idea my head was in front, but you never know until the judge calls your number".

=== 2012: three-year-old season ===
Lyric of Light made her three-year-old debut in the 199th running of the 1000 Guineas at Newmarket on 6 May and started the 8/1 fourth favourite behind Maybe, Mashoora (Prix Imprudence) and Moonstone Magic (Fred Darling Stakes). After racing in mid-division she weakened badly from half way and was eased down by Dettori to finish last of the seventeen runners behind Homecoming Queen. The filly was officially disqualified after a post-race urine test revealed traces of the banned painkiller Propoxyphene. Al Zarooni later was given an eight-year ban for multiple doping offences. Lyric of Light never raced again and was retired from racing at the end of the year to become a broodmare for Darley Stud.

== Pedigree ==
Pedigree of Lyric of Light (GB), bay mare, 2009
Sire Street Cry (IRE) 1998	Machiavellian (USA); 1987	Mr. Prospector	Raise a Native
Sire Street Cry (IRE) 1998	Machiavellian (USA); 1987	Mr. Prospector	Gold Digger
Sire Street Cry (IRE) 1998	Machiavellian (USA); 1987	Coup de Folie	Halo
Sire Street Cry (IRE) 1998	Machiavellian (USA); 1987	Coup de Folie	Raise the Standard
Sire Street Cry (IRE) 1998	Helen Street (GB); 1982	Troy	Petingo
Sire Street Cry (IRE) 1998	Helen Street (GB); 1982	Troy	La Milo
Sire Street Cry (IRE) 1998	Helen Street (GB); 1982	Waterway	Riverman
Sire Street Cry (IRE) 1998	Helen Street (GB); 1982	Waterway	Boulevard
Dam Suez (GB) 2002	Green Desert (USA); 1983	Danzig	Northern Dancer
Dam Suez (GB) 2002	Green Desert (USA); 1983	Danzig	Pas de Nom
Dam Suez (GB) 2002	Green Desert (USA); 1983	Foreign Courier	Sir Ivor
Dam Suez (GB) 2002	Green Desert (USA); 1983	Foreign Courier	Courtly Dee
Dam Suez (GB) 2002	Repeat Warning (GB); 1996	WARNING	Known Fact
Dam Suez (GB) 2002	Repeat Warning (GB); 1996	WARNING	Slightly Dangerous
Dam Suez (GB) 2002	Repeat Warning (GB); 1996	Reprocolor	Jimmy Reppin
Dam Suez (GB) 2002	Repeat Warning (GB); 1996	Reprocolor	Blue Queen (Family:13-e)
