= Certify (horse) =

American-bred Thoroughbred racehorse

- Racing colours of Godolphin
- Sire: Elusive Quality
- Grandsire: Gone West
- Dam: Please Sign In
- Damsire: Doc's Leader
- Sex: Filly
- Foaled: 12 March 2010
- Country: United States
- Colour: Bay
- Breeder: Hurstland Farm Inc, William Kartozian, Darley
- Owner: Godolphin
- Trainer: Mahmood Al Zarooni; Charlie Appleby
- Record: 7:5-0-0
- Earnings: £242,720

Major wins
- Sweet Solera Stakes (2012); May Hill Stakes (2012); Fillies' Mile (2012); The Cape Verdi (2014)

Awards
- European Champion Two-Year-Old Filly (2012); Top-rated European Two-Year-Old Filly (2012)

Certify (foaled 12 March 2010) is an American-bred, British-trained Thoroughbred racehorse. In her first season of racing, which began in July 2012 she won all four of her races including the Group One Fillies' Mile and ended the British season as one of the year's most highly rated two-year-old fillies. She was regarded as a leading contender for the following year's classics but was suspended from racing after failing a drug test in April 2013.

== Background ==
Certify is a bay filly with a white blaze and two white feet. She was bred in Kentucky by a partnership between Sheikh Mohammed's Darley Stud and Hurstland Farm, the breeders and part-owners of her dam, Please Sign In. Certify was sired by Elusive Quality, a stallion who has had success in both North America and Europe, siring major winners including Raven's Pass, Smarty Jones, Quality Road and Elusive Kate. As a daughter of Please Sign In, Certify is a half-sister to the Oak Leaf Stakes winner Cry and Catch Me.

As a yearling, the filly was sent to the sales at Keeneland where she was sold for $80,000 to the bloodstock agent John Ferguson. The deal saw Certify become the sole property of Sheikh Mohammed's Godolphin organisation. She is now trained by Charlie Appleby, who took over from Mahmood Al Zarooni, spending the winter in Dubai and the summer at Godolphin's Newmarket base.

== Racing career ==
=== 2012: two-year-old season ===
Certify began her racing career in a six furlong maiden race at Newmarket Racecourse in July. She was not expected to win, and started at odds of 10/1 while the other Godolphin runner, Shuruq, was made favourite. Ridden by Mickael Barzalona, Certify took the lead inside the final furlong and drew away to win by three lengths from Pearl Sea, with Shuruq finishing third. A month later, Certify was moved up in class and distance for the Group Three Sweet Solera Stakes over seven furlongs at the same course and started 11/8 favourite against seven opponents. The filly broke slowly and fought against Barzalona's attempts to restrain her in the early stages. She took the lead approaching the final furlong and won by a lengths from Sky Lantern. The form of the race was subsequently boosted when Sky Lantern won the Group One Moyglare Stud Stakes at the Curragh.

At the St Leger meeting at Doncaster Racecourse in September, Certify started 4/6 favourite for the May Hill Stakes over one mile. Barzalona held up the filly in the early stages before challenging the leaders in the straight. Despite being carried out to the right as the leaders drifted out from the rail she stayed on strongly to take the lead in the closing stages to win by a head from the Prix du Calvados winner Purr Along. The first two finished seven lengths clear of the other runners in what the Racing Post described as "a thrilling duel". On her final appearance of the season, Certify was moved up to Group One level for the Group One Shadwell Fillies' Mile, run for the second time at Newmarket after being moved from Ascot in 2011. She was made the 4/6 favourite, with her most serious rival expected to be Ollie Olga, a filly who had beaten Sky Lantern in the Prestige Stakes. Barzalona positioned the favourite towards the back of the six-runner field before moving forward in the last quarter of a mile. Certify took the lead and pulled clear to win by four and a half lengths, despite hanging to the left in the closing stages.

In November, Certify was named European Champion two-year-old filly at the Cartier Racing Awards. In the 2012 European Thoroughbred Racehorse Rankings, she was given a rating of 114, making her the highest-rated two-year-old filly of the season in Europe.

=== 2013: three-year-old season ===
On 9 April BHA officials made a visit to Al Zarooni's stables and carried out a series of random drug tests. Eleven horses, including Certify, produced samples which tested positive for anabolic steroids. The horses were suspended from racing pending an inquiry, meaning that Certify was ruled out of running in the 1000 Guineas. After the BHA's disciplinary panel imposed an eight-year ban on Al Zarooni on 25 April, it was announced that Certify, and the other horses involved would be banned from racing until 9 October 2013.

=== 2014: four-year-old season ===
After a break of 489 days, during which Charlie Appleby took over the training of the horses formerly handled by Al Zarooni, Certify reappeared in the Group Two Cape Verdi over one mile at Meydan Racecourse on 30 January 2014. Ridden as in all her previous races by Barzalona she raced towards the rear of the field before taking the lead a furlong from the finish and won easily from L'Amour de Ma Vie, with Flotilla (winner of the Breeders' Cup Juvenile Fillies Turf and the Poule d'Essai des Pouliches) in fourth place. Three weeks later she started 2/5 favourite for the Group Two Balanchine over nine furlong at the same course but sustained her first defeat as she finished fourth of the six runners behind L'Amour de Ma Vie. On her first race back in Europe, Certify ran poorly, finishing twelfth of the fourteen runners in the Duke of Cambridge Stakes at Royal Ascot in June.

== Pedigree ==
Pedigree of Certify (USA), bay filly, 2010
Sire Elusive Quality (USA) 1993	Gone West; 1984	Mr. Prospector	Raise a Native
Sire Elusive Quality (USA) 1993	Gone West; 1984	Mr. Prospector	Gold Digger
Sire Elusive Quality (USA) 1993	Gone West; 1984	Secrettame	Secretariat
Sire Elusive Quality (USA) 1993	Gone West; 1984	Secrettame	Tamerett
Sire Elusive Quality (USA) 1993	Touch of Greatness; 1986	Heros Honor	Northern Dancer
Sire Elusive Quality (USA) 1993	Touch of Greatness; 1986	Heros Honor	Glowing Tribute
Sire Elusive Quality (USA) 1993	Touch of Greatness; 1986	Ivory Wand	Sir Ivor
Sire Elusive Quality (USA) 1993	Touch of Greatness; 1986	Ivory Wand	Natashka
Dam Please Sign In (USA) 1996	Doc's Leader; 1986	Mr. Leader	Hail To Reason
Dam Please Sign In (USA) 1996	Doc's Leader; 1986	Mr. Leader	Jolie Deja
Dam Please Sign In (USA) 1996	Doc's Leader; 1986	With Patience	Nodouble
Dam Please Sign In (USA) 1996	Doc's Leader; 1986	With Patience	First Chapter
Dam Please Sign In (USA) 1996	Register; 1992	Mari's Book	Northern Dancer
Dam Please Sign In (USA) 1996	Register; 1992	Mari's Book	Well Kept
Dam Please Sign In (USA) 1996	Register; 1992	Lodge	Bold Lad
Dam Please Sign In (USA) 1996	Register; 1992	Lodge	Little Hut (Family: 4-r)
