= May Hill Stakes =

Flat horse race in Britain

- Class: Group 2
- Location: Doncaster Racecourse; Doncaster, England
- Inaugurated: 1976
- Race type: Flat / Thoroughbred
- Sponsor: Betfred
- Website: Doncaster

Race information
- Distance: 1 mile (1,609 metres)
- Surface: Turf
- Track: Straight
- Qualification: Two-year-old fillies
- Weight: 9 st 2 lb Penalties; 3 lb for G1 / G2 winners
- Purse: £120,000 (2025); 1st: £68,052

May Hill Stakes
2026
Musical Times	Scommessa Sicura	Speckles

Previous years
2025
Aylin	Pacific Mission	Sugar Island
2024
Desert Flower	January	Flight
2023
Darnation	See The Fire	Les Bleus
2022
Polly Pott	Novakai	Perfect Prophet
2021
Inspiral	Prosperous Voyage	Rolling The Dice

2020-2011
2020
Indigo Girl	Dubai Fountain	Zabeel Queen
2019
Powerful Breeze	Boomer	Alpen Rose
2018
Fleeting	Star Terms	Sand Share
2017
Laurens	Dark Rose Angel	Nyaleti
2016
Rich Legacy	Grecian Light	Urban Fox
2015
Turret Rocks	Marenko	Opal Tiara
2014
Agnes Stewart	Muraaqaba	Shagah
2013
Ihtimal	Majeyda	Lady Lara
2012
Certify	Purr Along	Light Up My Life
2011
Lyric Of Light	Fallen For You	Samitar

2010-2001
2010
White Moonstone	Al Madina	Musharakaat
2009
Pollenator	Hibaayeb	Seta
2008
Rainbow View	Snoqualmie Girl	Lahaleeb
2007
Spacious	Kotsi	Celtic Slipper
2006
Simply Perfect	English Ballet	Sans Reward
2005
Nasheej	High Heel Sneakers	Speciosa
2004
Playful Act	Queen of Poland	Maids Causeway
2003
Kinnaird	Hathrah	Lucky Pipit
2002
Summitville	Approach	Nasij
2001
Half Glance	Echo River	Shadow Dancing

2000-1991
2000
Karasta	Ameerat	Candice
1999
Teggiano	Everlasting Love	Aunty Rose
1998
Calando	Kalidasa	Barafamy
1997
Midnight Line	Flawless	Glorosia
1996
Reams Of Verse	Dame Laura	Gretel
1995
Solar Crystal	Like A Hawk	Ruznama
1994
Mamlakah	Spout	Poppy Carew
1993
Hawajiss	Kissing Cousin	News And Echo
1992
Marillette	Self Assured	Ivanka
1991
Midnight Air	Feminine Wiles	Super Sarena

1990-1988
1990
Majmu	Shamshir	Trojan Crown
1989
Rafha	Knight's Baroness	Fair Titania
1988
Tessla	Roseate Tern	Always On A Sunday

The May Hill Stakes is a Group 2 flat horse race in Great Britain open to two-year-old fillies. It is run at Doncaster over a distance of 1 mile (1,609 metres), and takes place each year in September.

== History ==
The event is named after May Hill, a successful filly whose victories included Doncaster's Park Hill Stakes in 1975. It was established in 1976, and was originally classed at Group 3 level. It was promoted to Group 2 status in 2003.

The May Hill Stakes is currently held on the first day of the four-day St. Leger Festival.

The leading horses from the race often go on to compete in the Fillies' Mile. The last to win both was Inspiral in 2021, when she was unbeaten in four races.

== Records ==
Leading jockey (6 wins):

- Frankie Dettori – Calando (1998), Teggiano (1999), White Moonstone (2010), Lyric of Light (2011), Indigo Girl (2020), Inspiral (2021)

Leading trainer (12 wins):

- Sir Henry Cecil – Formulate (1978), Bright Crocus (1982), Ever Genial (1984), Laluche (1986), Intimate Guest (1987), Tessla (1988), Rafha (1989), Midnight Air (1991), Solar Crystal (1995), Reams of Verse (1996), Midnight Line (1997), Half Glance (2001)

== Winners ==
Year	Winner	Jockey	Trainer	Time
1976	Triple First	Greville Starkey	Michael Stoute	1:45.92
1977	Tartan Pimpernel	Willie Carson	Dick Hern	1:42.55
1978	Formulate	Joe Mercer	Henry Cecil	1:41.69
1979	The Dancer	Willie Carson	Dick Hern	1:40.23
1980 (Note: The 1980 running took place at Kempton Park)	Exclusively Raised	Greville Starkey	Michael Stoute	1:42.51
1981	Height of Fashion	Joe Mercer	Dick Hern	1:42.57
1982	Bright Crocus	Lester Piggott	Henry Cecil	1:39.37
1983	Satinette	Willie Carson	Dick Hern	1:40.57
1984	Ever Genial	Lester Piggott	Henry Cecil	1:42.88
1985	Midway Lady	Lester Piggott	Ben Hanbury	1:38.98
1986	Laluche	Steve Cauthen	Henry Cecil	1:40.42
1987	Intimate Guest	Steve Cauthen	Henry Cecil	1:39.27
1988	Tessla	Michael Roberts	Henry Cecil	1:39.24
1989	Rafha	Steve Cauthen	Henry Cecil	1:41.85
1990	Majmu	Willie Carson	John Gosden	1:41.67
1991	Midnight Air	Pat Eddery	Henry Cecil	1:38.72
1992	Marillette	Pat Eddery	John Gosden	1:38.56
1993	Hawajiss	Walter Swinburn	Michael Stoute	1:40.61
1994	Mamlakah	Richard Hills	Harry Thomson Jones	1:39.59
1995	Solar Crystal	Willie Ryan	Henry Cecil	1:39.44
1996	Reams of Verse	Pat Eddery	Henry Cecil	1:38.87
1997	Midnight Line	Kieren Fallon	Henry Cecil	1:37.49
1998	Calando	Frankie Dettori	David Loder	1:41.37
1999	Teggiano	Frankie Dettori	Clive Brittain	1:40.01
2000	Karasta	Johnny Murtagh	Sir Michael Stoute	1:37.95
2001	Half Glance	Richard Quinn	Henry Cecil	1:42.64
2002	Summitville	Micky Fenton	James Given	1:38.48
2003	Kinnaird	Kevin Darley	Patrick Haslam	1:40.66
2004	Playful Act	Jimmy Fortune	John Gosden	1:35.40
2005	Nasheej	Richard Hughes	Richard Hannon Sr.	1:36.67
2006 (Note: The 2006 edition was held at York)	Simply Perfect	Darryll Holland	Jeremy Noseda	1:39.24
2007	Spacious	Jamie Spencer	James Fanshawe	1:37.58
2008	Rainbow View	Jimmy Fortune	John Gosden	1:42.42
2009	Pollenator	Ryan Moore	Richard Hannon Sr.	1:37.93
2010	White Moonstone	Frankie Dettori	Saeed bin Suroor	1:38.73
2011	Lyric of Light	Frankie Dettori	Mahmood Al Zarooni	1:38.39
2012	Certify	Mickael Barzalona	Mahmood Al Zarooni	1:38.92
2013	Ihtimal	Silvestre de Sousa	Saeed bin Suroor	1:43.30
2014	Agnes Stewart	Billy Lee	Edward Lynam	1:37.20
2015	Turret Rocks	Kevin Manning	Jim Bolger	1:36.82
2016	Rich Legacy	Oisin Murphy	Ralph Beckett	1:41.24
2017	Laurens	P. J. McDonald	Karl Burke	1:40.06
2018	Fleeting	Donnacha O'Brien	Aidan O'Brien	1:38.71
2019	Powerful Breeze	James Doyle	Hugo Palmer	1:39.31
2020	Indigo Girl	Frankie Dettori	John Gosden	1:38.84
2021	Inspiral	Frankie Dettori	John and Thady Gosden	1:37.47
2022	Polly Pott	Daniel Tudhope	Harry Dunlop	1:38.34
2023	Darnation	Clifford Lee	Karl Burke	1:41.38
2024	Desert Flower	William Buick	Charlie Appleby	1:37.47
2025	Aylin	David Egan	Karl Burke	1:39.79
2026	Musical Times	William Buick	Charlie Appleby	1:37.58

== See also ==
- Horse racing in Great Britain
- List of British flat horse races
