= John Dunlop (racehorse trainer) =

British race horse trainer (1939–2018)

John Leeper Dunlop
Personal information
- Born: 10 July 1939 Tetbury, England
- Died: 7 July 2018 (aged 78)
- Occupation: Trainer

Horse racing career
- Sport: Horse racing

Major racing wins
- British Classic Race wins: 1,000 Guineas (3); Epsom Oaks (2); Epsom Derby (2); St. Leger Stakes (3)

Honours
- Champion Trainer (1995); Order of the British Empire

Significant horses
- Awaasif, Beauchamp King, Circus Plume, Elnadim, Erhaab, Habibti, Invincible Spirit, Lavinia Fontana, Marju, Mehthaaf, Millenary, Mountain Lodge, North Stoke, Posse, Quick As Lightning, Ragstone, Salsabil, Scottish Rifle, Sea Chimes, Shadayid, Shirley Heights, Silver Patriarch, Wassl

John Leeper Dunlop OBE (10 July 1939 – 7 July 2018) was an English race horse trainer based in Arundel, Sussex. He trained the winners of 74 Group One races, including 10 British Classics, with over 3000 winners in total. He was the British flat racing Champion Trainer in 1995.

Born in Tetbury, he first took out a training licence in 1966. After a two-year apprenticeship with Neville Dent and Gordon Smyth he took over Castle Stables in Arundel, on the Duke of Norfolk's estate.

He played a pivotal role in the establishment of Middle Eastern influences in British horseracing, training Hatta, Sheikh Mohammed's first winner as an owner at Brighton in 1977. He was also associated with Sheikh Hamdan Al Maktoum over a period of three decades, training horses such as Salsabil, winner of the 1,000 Guineas, Oaks and Irish Derby. The main jockeys with which he was associated include the Australian Ron Hutchinson, Willie Carson, Pat Eddery and Lester Piggott . In later years he was also associated with Richard Quinn and Ted Durcan. The 2,000 Guineas was the only British Classic that eluded him.

Dunlop was appointed OBE in the 1996 Birthday Honours. He was also a trustee of the British Racing School.

In 2001, he suffered a ruptured aorta, but survived. He retired at the end of the 2012 flat racing season. His sons, Ed and Harry, are also both trainers. Jeremy Noseda and Gerard Butler also learnt their trade with him.

He died on 7 July 2018 at the age of 78.

== Major wins ==
1000 Guineas
1980
Quick As Lightning	Our Home	Mrs Penny
1990
Salsabil	Heart of Joy	Negligent
1991
Shadayid	Kooyonga	Crystal Gazing

Derby
1978
Shirley Heights	Hawaiian Sound	Remainder Man
1994
Erhaab	King's Theatre	Colonel Collins

Oaks
1984
Circus Plume	Media Luna	Poquito Queen
1990
Salsabil	Game Plan	Knight's Baroness

St Leger
1986
Moon Madness	Celestial Storm	Untold
1997
Silver Patriarch	Vertical Speed	The Fly
2000
Millenary	Air Marshall	Chimes at Midnight

(United Kingdom) Great Britain

- 1,000 Guineas - (3) - Quick As Lightning (1980), Salsabil (1990), Shadayid (1991)
- Ascot Gold Cup - (1) - Ragstone (1974)
- Coronation Cup - (2) - Sea Chimes (1980), Silver Patriarch (1998)
- Derby - (2) - Shirley Heights (1978), Erhaab (1994)
- Dewhurst Stakes - (1) - Mujahid (1998)
- Eclipse Stakes - (1) - Scottish Rifle (1973)
- Falmouth Stakes - (1) - Tashawak (2002)
- Fillies' Mile - (2) - Quick As Lightning (1979), Aqaarid (1994)
- Haydock Sprint Cup - (4) - Runnett (1981), Habibti (1983), Lavinia Fontana (1994), Invincible Spirit (2002)
- July Cup - (2) - Habibti (1983), Elnadim (1998)
- King's Stand Stakes - (2) - Habibti (1984), Chilibang (1988)
- Lockinge Stakes - (1) - Wassl (1984 dead-heat)
- Nunthorpe Stakes - (1) - Habibti (1983)
- Oaks - (2) - Circus Plume (1984), Salsabil (1990)
- Prince of Wales's Stakes - (1) - Arthur (1971)
- Queen Anne Stakes - (1) - Lahib (1992)
- Queen Elizabeth II Stakes - (3) - Trusted (1977), Lahib (1992), Bahri (1995)
- Racing Post Trophy - (1) - Beauchamp King (1995)
- St. James's Palace Stakes - (3) - Posse (1980), Marju (1991), Bahri (1995)
- St. Leger - (3) - Moon Madness (1986), Silver Patriarch (1997), Millenary (2000)
- Sun Chariot Stakes - (1) - Talented (1993)
- Sussex Stakes - (1) - Posse (1980)
- Yorkshire Oaks - (2) - Awaasif (1982), Circus Plume (1984)

France

- Grand Prix de Saint-Cloud - (1) - Moon Madness (1987)
- Prix de l'Abbaye de Longchamp - (1) - Habibti (1983)
- Prix du Cadran - (2) - San Sebastian (2000), Give Notice (2002)
- Prix Ganay - (1) - Golden Snake (2001)
- Prix Jean Prat - (1) - Olden Times (2001)
- Prix Marcel Boussac - (3) - Ashayer (1987), Salsabil (1989), Shadayid (1990)
- Prix Vermeille - (2) - Salsabil (1990), Leggera (1998)

Germany

- Aral-Pokal - (1) - Almaarad (1988)
- Bayerisches Zuchtrennen - (1) - Highland Chieftain (1986)
- Preis von Europa - (3) - Taipan (1997, 1998), Golden Snake (2000)

(Republic of Ireland) Ireland

- Irish 1,000 Guineas - (2) - Black Satin (1970), Mehthaaf (1994)
- Irish 2,000 Guineas - (1) - Wassl (1983)
- Irish Champion Stakes - (1) - North Stoke (1977)
- Irish Derby - (2) - Shirley Heights (1978), Salsabil (1990)
- Irish St. Leger - (1) - Mountain Lodge (1983)
- Matron Stakes - (3) - Llyn Gwynant (1988), Cloud of Dust (1992), Iftiraas (2000)
- Moyglare Stud Stakes - (1) - Habibti (1982)

Italy

- Derby Italiano - (1) - Tommy Way (1986)
- Gran Criterium - (4) - Sanam (1986), Sikeston (1988), Alhijaz (1991), Hello (1996)
- Gran Premio del Jockey Club - (3) - Silvernesian (1992), Silver Patriarch (1998), Golden Snake (2000)
- Gran Premio di Milano - (1) - Alwuhush (1989)
- Premio Lydia Tesio - (3) - Miss Secreto (1989), Oumaldaaya (1992), Claxon (2000)
- Premio Parioli - (2) - Sikeston (1989), Alhijaz (1992)
- Premio Presidente della Repubblica - (2) - Jalmood (1983), Alwuhush (1989)
- Premio Roma - (4) - High Hawk (1983), Highland Chieftain (1989), Taipan (1997, 1998)
- Premio Vittorio di Capua - (2) - Alhijaz (1992, 1993)
