= Elnadim =

American-bred Thoroughbred racehorse

- Sire: Danzig
- Grandsire: Northern Dancer
- Dam: Elle Seule
- Damsire: Exclusive Native
- Sex: Stallion
- Foaled: 24 April 1994
- Country: United States
- Colour: Dark Bay or Brown
- Breeder: Shadwell Farm
- Owner: Hamdan Al Maktoum
- Trainer: John Dunlop; Kiaran McLaughlin
- Record: 16: 5-3-2
- Earnings: £192,294

Major wins
- Hopeful Stakes (1997); Diadem Stakes (1997); July Cup (1998)

Elnadim (28 April 1994 – 14 January 2015) was an American-bred, British-trained Thoroughbred racehorse and sire. After failing to win as a juvenile he developed into a high-class sprinter in 1997, winning four of his six races including the Hopeful Stakes and the Diadem Stakes. In the following year he recorded his biggest success when he won the Group One July Cup. His subsequent form was disappointing and he was retired from racing in 2000. He stood as a breeding stallion in the United States, Ireland, Australia and New Zealand and had some success as a sire of winners. He died in 2015 at the age of twenty-one.

== Background ==
Elnadim was a dark bay or brown horse standing 16.1 hands high with a white star and white socks on his hind legs. He was bred in Kentucky by Shadwell Farm, the breeding operation of his owner Hamdan Al Maktoum. His sire Danzig, who ran only three times before his career was ended by injury, was a highly successful stallion who sired the winners of more than fifty Grade I/Group One races. His offspring include the champions Chief's Crown, Dayjur and Lure as well as the important stallion Danehill. Elnadim's dam Elle Seule was a high-class racemare, whose wins included the Prix d'Astarte in 1986. Before foaling Elnadim, she had produced the Irish 1,000 Guineas winner Mehthaaf, whilst another of her foals, Only Seule, was the female-line ancestor of Intello. Elle Seule's dam Fall Aspen was an outstanding broodmare whose other descendants have included Timber Country and Dubai Millennium.

The colt was sent to Europe where he was trained by John Dunlop at Arundel, West Sussex.

== Racing career ==
=== 1996: two-year-old season ===
On his racecourse debut, Elnadim started 11/10 favourite for the Convivial Maiden Stakes over six furlongs at York Racecourse in August but finished fourth of the eight runners behind Indiscreet. In November he was made favourite for a similar event at Newmarket Racecourse and finished second to the Godolphin colt Kumait. In this race he was ridden by Richard Hills who partnered him in all but one of his subsequent European starts.

=== 1997: three-year-old season ===
Elnadim missed the spring of 1997 and made his first appearance of the season in a maiden race at Pontefract Racecourse on 3 June. Starting the 1/2 favourite, he took the lead approaching the final furlong before drawing away in the closing stages to record his first success, beating Present Chance by four lengths. In July he contested a handicap race at Newmarket and finished second to Danetime from whom he was receiving four pounds. The winner went on to take the Stewards' Cup on his next appearance. Two weeks after his defeat at Newmarket, the colt carried top weight of 133 pounds to victory in a minor handicap at Great Yarmouth Racecourse. In August Elnadim was moved up in class for the Listed Hopeful Stakes over six furlongs at Newmarket. Ridden by Mick Kinane, he was among the leaders from the start before accelerating in the last quarter mile to win by one and a quarter lengths from the favourite Bollin Joanne.

On 27 September, Elnadim was stepped up again in class for the Group Two Diadem Stakes at Ascot Racecourse. He started 4/1 second choice in the betting behind the four-year-old Russian Revival (winner of the Bentinck Stakes and the Dubai Duty Free Trophy), whilst the other leading contenders were Dazzle (Cherry Hinton Stakes), Averti (King George Stakes) and Monaassib (Prix de Ris-Orangis). Hills sent the colt into the lead from the start and was never seriously challenged, drawing clear in the final furlong to win by three lengths from Monaassib. On his final run of the year he was moved up in distance for the Challenge Stakes at Newmarket in October when he started favourite but finished fourth behind the Godolphin runner Kahal.

=== 1998: four-year-old season ===
Elnadim began his third season in the Duke of York Stakes in May. He started favourite but after leading for most of the way he was overtaken inside the final furlong and beaten half a length by Bollin Joanne. In the Temple Stakes at Sandown Park Racecourse later that month he was again the beaten favourite, finishing third to Bolshoi and Lochangel.

Despite his two defeats in spring, Elnadim was made 3/1 favourite when he lined up for the July Cup at Newmarket on 9 July. Kahal, Bolshoi, Bollin Joanne, Danetime, Russian Revival, Monaassib and Averti were again in opposition, whilst the other major contenders were Tamarisk, Bold Fact (July Stakes), Arkadian Hero (Mill Reef Stakes) and Pas de Reponse. The runners split into separate groups across the wide Newmarket straight with Hills sending Elnadim into an early lead along the rail on the stands-side (the right hand side from the jockeys' viewpoint). He maintained his advantage throughout and pulled clear in the closing stages to win by two lengths from Tamarisk, who got the better of Danetime and Arkadian Hero in a three-way photo finish for second. Hills was given a two-day suspension for excessive use of his whip on the winner. The winning time of 1:09.72 was a new course record.

Elnadim failed to reproduce his Newmarket form in his two subsequent starts that year despite starting favourite on both occasions. At York in August he appeared outpaced in the closing stages when running eleventh behind Lochangel in the Nunthorpe Stakes and a month later at Haydock Park he finished twelfth of thirteen behind Tamarisk in the Haydock Sprint Cup.

=== 2000: six-year-old season ===
After missing the whole of the 1999 season Elnadim was sent to the United States in 2000 to be trained by Kiaran McLaughlin. He finished unplaced in allowance races at Saratoga Race Course in August and Belmont Park in September. On his final appearance he contested the Nureyev Stakes over five and a half furlongs at Keeneland Racecourse in October. Ridden by Pat Day, he was rushed into an early lead before finishing third behind the odds-on favourite Morluc.

== Stud record ==
Elnadim was retired from racing to become a breeding stallion. After a season at Shadwell's base in Kentucky he returned to Europe in 2002 where he was based at the Derrinstown Stud in Ireland. He was also shuttled to Australia and New Zealand for the Southern hemisphere breeding season. He was retired from stud duties in 2014 after suffering from chronic arthrosis. His condition deteriorated and he was euthanized on 14 January 2015.

The best of his winners included Al Qasi (Phoenix Sprint Stakes), Culminate (Tristarc Stakes), Wi Dud (Flying Childers Stakes), Elnawin (Sirenia Stakes), Plum Pudding (Bunbury Cup), Caldra (Autumn Stakes), Santo Padre (Portland Handicap), Pasar Silbano (La Habra Stakes) and Elletelle (Queen Mary Stakes).

== Pedigree ==
Pedigree of Elnadim (USA), bay or brown stallion, 1994
Sire Danzig (USA) 1977	Northern Dancer (CAN); 1961	Nearctic	Nearco
Sire Danzig (USA) 1977	Northern Dancer (CAN); 1961	Nearctic	Lady Angela
Sire Danzig (USA) 1977	Northern Dancer (CAN); 1961	Natalma	Native Dancer
Sire Danzig (USA) 1977	Northern Dancer (CAN); 1961	Natalma	Almahmoud
Sire Danzig (USA) 1977	Pas de Nom (USA); 1968	Admiral's Voyage	Crafty Admiral
Sire Danzig (USA) 1977	Pas de Nom (USA); 1968	Admiral's Voyage	Olympia Lou
Sire Danzig (USA) 1977	Pas de Nom (USA); 1968	Petitioner	Petition
Sire Danzig (USA) 1977	Pas de Nom (USA); 1968	Petitioner	Steady Aim
Dam Elle Seule (USA) 1983	Exclusive Native (USA); 1965	Raise a Native	Native Dancer
Dam Elle Seule (USA) 1983	Exclusive Native (USA); 1965	Raise a Native	Raise You
Dam Elle Seule (USA) 1983	Exclusive Native (USA); 1965	Exclusive	Shut Out
Dam Elle Seule (USA) 1983	Exclusive Native (USA); 1965	Exclusive	Good Example
Dam Elle Seule (USA) 1983	Fall Aspen (USA); 1976	Pretense	Endeavour
Dam Elle Seule (USA) 1983	Fall Aspen (USA); 1976	Pretense	Imitation
Dam Elle Seule (USA) 1983	Fall Aspen (USA); 1976	Change Water	Swaps
Dam Elle Seule (USA) 1983	Fall Aspen (USA); 1976	Change Water	Portage (Family: 4-m)

- Elnadim was inbred 4 x 4 to Native Dancer, meaning that this stallion appears twice in the fourth generation of his pedigree.
