= Nureyev (horse) =

American-bred Thoroughbred racehorse (1977–2001)

- Sire: Northern Dancer
- Grandsire: Nearctic
- Dam: Special
- Damsire: Forli
- Sex: Stallion
- Foaled: 2 May 1977
- Died: 29 October 2001
- Country: United States
- Colour: Bay
- Breeder: Claiborne Farm
- Owner: Stavros Niarchos
- Trainer: François Boutin
- Record: 3: 2-0-0
- Earnings: $42,018

Major wins
- Prix Thomas Bryon (1979); Prix Djebel (1980)

Awards
- Timeform rating: 131 (1980); Leading sire in France (1987); Leading broodmare sire in Britain & Ireland (1997)
- Last updated on 12 March 2025

Nureyev (2 May 1977 – 29 October 2001) was an American-bred, French-trained Thoroughbred racehorse and champion sire. As a racehorse, he was best known as the disqualified "winner" of the 2000 Guineas in 1980.

== Background ==
Nureyev was a small bay horse with a white blaze and white sock on his right hind leg bred in Kentucky by the Claiborne Farm. He was sired by Northern Dancer out of the mare Special. He was bought in 1978 at the Keeneland yearling sale by Stavros Niarchos for US$1.3 million ($6.4 million inflation adjusted), at the time the second-highest price ever paid for a yearling—behind only Canadian Bound. Niarchos named the colt in honor of the famous ballet dancer, Rudolf Nureyev. Niarchos sent the colt to race in Europe where he was trained by François Boutin.

== Racing career ==
In November 1979, Nureyev made his two-year-old racing debut in France. He easily outdistanced the field in the Prix Thomas Bryon at Saint-Cloud Racecourse, winning by six lengths.

The following spring of 1980, he won the Prix Djebel at Maisons-Laffitte Racecourse in his three-year-old debut. He was then sent to Newmarket Racecourse for the British Classic 2000 Guineas. His rider, Philippe Paquet, restrained Nureyev in the early stages before moving through the field to make his challenge in the final quarter mile. He got the better of a brief struggle with Known Fact to win by a neck. Posse, whom Nureyev had interfered with 2.5 furlongs from the winning post, finished strongly to take third less than a length behind. After an inquiry lasting almost an hour, the stewards disqualified Nureyev, relegated him to last place and awarded the race to Known Fact. Paquet was disqualified from riding for seven days. It was the first time that a winner of the 2,000 Guineas had been disqualified. Nureyev was scheduled to compete in June's Epsom Derby but came down with a virus and never raced again.

== Stud record ==
Nureyev was sent to stand at stud at his owner's Haras de Fresnay-le-Buffard in Neuvy-au-Houlme in Lower Normandy. Renowned French horseman Alec Head recommended Nureyev to Lexington, Kentucky breeder John T. L. Jones Jr. and in mid-1981 put together a syndicate that purchased Nureyev for US$14 million. Nureyev was brought to Jones' Walmac-Warnerton Farm partnership near Lexington and then under Jones' wholly owned Walmac International.

On May 5, 1987, Nureyev suffered a life-threatening fracture to his right hind leg in a paddock accident during breeding season, but veterinary surgeons were able to save his life.

During his breeding career, Nureyev sired 135 stakes winners and more than twenty champions, despite fertility problems. In 1998, Sheikh Mohammed bin Rashid Al Maktoum set a European sales record when he paid three million guineas (about $5.4 million) for yearling colt Abshurr by Nureyev at the Newmarket sales.

Nureyev died at the age of 24 on October 29, 2001. He is buried at Walmac International in Lexington, Kentucky.

=== Major winners ===
c = colt, f = filly, g = gelding

| Foaled | Name | Sex | Major Wins |
| 1982 | Theatrical | c | Breeders' Cup Turf, Turf Classic, Man o' War Stakes, Hialeah Turf Cup Handicap, Bowling Green Stakes, Sword Dancer Stakes |
| 1983 | Sonic Lady | f | Irish 1000 Guineas, Coronation Stakes, Sussex Stakes, Prix du Moulin |
| 1984 | Miesque | f | Prix de la Salamandre, Prix Marcel Boussac, Poule d'Essai des Pouliches, 1000 Guineas, Prix du Moulin, Prix d'Ispahan, Prix Jacques Le Marois, Breeders' Cup Mile |
| 1984 | Soviet Star | c | Poule d'Essai des Poulains, Sussex Stakes, Prix de la Forêt, July Cup, Prix du Moulin |
| 1984 | Stately Don | c | Hollywood Derby, Secretariat Stakes |
| 1985 | Alwuhush | c | Premio Presidente della Repubblica, Gran Premio di Milano |
| 1985 | Pattern Step | f | Hollywood Oaks |
| 1986 | Zilzal | c | Sussex Stakes, Queen Elizabeth II Stakes |
| 1987 | Rudimentary | c | Sandown Mile |
| 1987 | Polar Falcon | c | Haydock Sprint Cup |
| 1989 | Kitwood | c | Prix Jean Prat |
| 1989 | Wolfhound | c | Haydock Sprint Cup |
| 1991 | Flagbird | f | Premio Presidente della Repubblica |
| 1991 | Heart Lake | c | Yasuda Kinen |
| 1991 | Mehthaaf | f | Irish 1000 Guineas |
| 1992 | Atticus | c | Oaklawn Handicap |
| 1993 | Joyeux Danseur | c | Turf Classic Stakes |
| 1993 | Spinning World | c | Irish 2000 Guineas, Prix Jacques Le Marois, Prix du Moulin, Breeders' Cup Mile |
| 1994 | Black Hawk | c | Sprinters Stakes, Yasuda Kinen |
| 1994 | Peintre Celebre | c | Prix du Jockey Club, Grand Prix de Paris, Prix de l'Arc de Triomphe |
| 1994 | Reams of Verse | f | Fillies' Mile, Epsom Oaks |
| 1996 | Good Journey | c | Atto Mile |
| 1996 | Gracioso | c | Prix Lupin |
| 1996 | Senure | c | United Nations Stakes, Clement L. Hirsch Turf Championship Stakes |
| 1996 | Skimming | c | Pacific Classic |
| 1996 | Stravinsky | c | July Cup, Nunthorpe Stakes |
| 1997 | Fasliyev | c | Phoenix Stakes, Prix Morny |
| 1997 | No Matter What | f | Del Mar Oaks |
| 1997 | Special Ring | g | Eddie Read Stakes |
| 1998 | Crystal Music | f | Fillies' Mile |
| 1998 | King Charlemagne | c | Prix Maurice de Gheest |

=== Damsire ===
Nureyev is also the damsire of several top international horses, including:

- Peteski – the 1993 Canadian Triple Crown champion
- Bago – the 2004 European Champion 3-Yr-Old Colt
- Spinning Queen – sold in November 2006 for three million guineas, becoming the most expensive filly ever sold at public auction in Europe
- Desert King – winner of the 1996 National Stakes, the 1997 Irish 2,000 Guineas and Irish Derby Stakes
- Zabeel – won 1989 MRVC Stakes (1989), the 1990 Australian Guineas and Craiglee Stakes. Twice Champion Australian sire and four-time Champion New Zealand sire
- Big Brown – 2008 Kentucky Derby winner and the 2008 Preakness Stakes winner
- Manistique – California millionaire mare who won three Grade 1 races.
- To the Victory – Multiple graded stakes winner in Japan, including the 2001 Queen Elizabeth II Cup. Placed second in the Dubai World Cup, Japan's highest placing in the race until Victoire Pisa won the race in 2011.

== Pedigree ==
Pedigree of Nureyev (USA), bay stallion, 1977
| Sire Northern Dancer (CAN) 1961 | Nearctic (CAN); 1954 | Nearco | Pharos |
| Sire Northern Dancer (CAN) 1961 | Nearctic (CAN); 1954 | Nearco | Nogara |
| Sire Northern Dancer (CAN) 1961 | Nearctic (CAN); 1954 | Lady Angela | Hyperion |
| Sire Northern Dancer (CAN) 1961 | Nearctic (CAN); 1954 | Lady Angela | Sister Sarah |
| Sire Northern Dancer (CAN) 1961 | Natalma (USA); 1957 | Native Dancer | Polynesian |
| Sire Northern Dancer (CAN) 1961 | Natalma (USA); 1957 | Native Dancer | Geisha |
| Sire Northern Dancer (CAN) 1961 | Natalma (USA); 1957 | Almahmoud | Mahmoud |
| Sire Northern Dancer (CAN) 1961 | Natalma (USA); 1957 | Almahmoud | Arbitrator |
| Dam Special (USA) 1969 | Forli (ARG); 1963 | Aristophanes | Hyperion |
| Dam Special (USA) 1969 | Forli (ARG); 1963 | Aristophanes | Commotion |
| Dam Special (USA) 1969 | Forli (ARG); 1963 | Trevisa | Advocate |
| Dam Special (USA) 1969 | Forli (ARG); 1963 | Trevisa | Veneta |
| Dam Special (USA) 1969 | Thong (USA); 1964 | Nantallah | Nasrullah |
| Dam Special (USA) 1969 | Thong (USA); 1964 | Nantallah | Shimmer |
| Dam Special (USA) 1969 | Thong (USA); 1964 | Rough Shod | Gold Bridge |
| Dam Special (USA) 1969 | Thong (USA); 1964 | Rough Shod | Dalmary (Family 5-h) |
