= Neville Callaghan =

Irish racehorse trainer (1946–2023)

Personal information
- Nationality: Irish
- Born: May 4, 1946 Ireland
- Died: December 2, 2023 (aged 77)
- Occupation: Racehorse trainer
- Years active: 1970–2008

Horse racing career
- Sport: Horse racing

Neville Anthony Callaghan (4 May 1946 – 2 December 2023) was an Irish racehorse trainer who was based in Britain throughout his training career. He trained horses who competed in both flat racing and National Hunt racing and his horses won nearly 900 races in a career which lasted from 1970 to 2008. Callaghan died on 2 December 2023, at the age of 77.

== Major wins ==
- Fillies' Mile - Fairy Heights (1993)
- Irish Champion Hurdle - Royal Vulcan (1983), Royal Derbi (1993)
- National Stakes - Danehill Dancer (1995)
- Phoenix Stakes - Danehill Dancer (1995)
