= Clive Brittain =

British racehorse trainer (born 1934)

Clive Brittain (born 15 December 1934) is a retired British race-horse trainer. He started in racing as an apprentice jockey, then worked as a stable lad for Noel Murless for 23 years before becoming a licensed trainer in 1972. During his 43-year career as a trainer in Newmarket, Suffolk, he won every British Classic except for the Derby. In 1989, he saddled Terimon to finish second in the Derby at odds of 500-1. His best-known horse was Pebbles, winner of the 1,000 Guineas in 1984 and the Breeders' Cup Turf in 1985.

Brittain announced his retirement, aged 81, in September 2015, saying he wished to devote his time to looking after his wife. He sent out his final runner the following month.

== Major wins ==
(United Kingdom) Great Britain

- 1,000 Guineas – (2) – Pebbles (1984), Sayyedati (1993)
- 2,000 Guineas – (1) – Mystiko (1991)
- Champion Stakes – (1) – Pebbles (1985)
- Cheveley Park Stakes – (1) – Sayyedati (1992)
- Coronation Cup – (2) – Warrsan (2003, 2004)
- Coronation Stakes – (2) – Crimplene (2000), Rizeena (2014)
- Eclipse Stakes – (1) – Pebbles (1985)
- Falmouth Stakes – (2) – Gussy Marlowe (1992), Rajeem (2006)
- Fillies' Mile – (3) – Ivanka (1992), Teggiano (1999), Hibaayeb (2009)
- International Stakes – (1) – Terimon (1991)
- Nassau Stakes – (1) – Crimplene (2000)
- Oaks – (1) – User Friendly (1992)
- Queen Anne Stakes – (3) – Radetzky (1978), Sikeston (1991), Alflora (1993)
- Queen Elizabeth II Stakes – (1) – Air Express (1997)
- St. James's Palace Stakes – (2) – Averof (1974), Radetzky (1976)
- St. Leger – (2) – Julio Mariner (1978), User Friendly (1992)
- Sun Chariot Stakes – (1) – Warning Shadows (1995)
- Sussex Stakes – (1) – Sayyedati (1995)
- Yorkshire Oaks – (1) – User Friendly (1992)

France

- Grand Prix de Saint-Cloud – (1) – User Friendly (1993)
- Prix de l'Abbaye de Longchamp – (1) – Var (2004)
- Prix Jacques Le Marois – (1) – Sayyedati (1993)
- Prix Jean Prat – (1) – Lapierre (1988)

Germany

- Deutschland-Preis – (1) – Luso (1997)
- Grosser Preis von Baden – (2) – Warrsan (2004, 2005)
- Rheinland-Pokal – (2) – Luso (1996, 1998)

Hong Kong

- Hong Kong Vase – (2) – Luso (1996, 1997)

(Republic of Ireland) Ireland

- Irish 1,000 Guineas – (1) – Crimplene (2000)
- Irish Oaks – (1) – User Friendly (1992)
- Moyglare Stud Stakes – (2) – Sayyedati (1992), Rizeena (2013)
- Pretty Polly Stakes – (1) – Game Plan (1990)

Italy

- Derby Italiano – (2) – Hailsham (1991), Luso (1995)
- Oaks d'Italia – (1) – Menhoubah (2004)
- Premio Parioli – (1) – Air Express (1997)
- Premio Presidente della Repubblica – (2) – Sikeston (1991, 1992)
- Premio Regina Elena – (1) – Love of Dubai (2008)
- Premio Roma – (1) – Sikeston (1991)
- Premio Vittorio di Capua – (2) – Sikeston (1990, 1991)

Japan

- Japan Cup – (1) – Jupiter Island (1986)

United States

- Breeders' Cup Turf – (1) – Pebbles (1985)
