= Mahmood Al Zarooni =

Emirati racehorse trainer (born 1975)

Mahmood Al Zarooni (born October 16, 1975) is an Emirati racehorse trainer. In 2010 he was appointed as one of Godolphin's two trainers in Newmarket and Dubai, along with Saeed bin Suroor. His first winner was Calming Influence, who won the Group 2 Godolphin Mile on 27 March 2010 at the Dubai World Cup meeting.

On 22 April 2013, the British Horseracing Authority disclosed that 11 horses trained by Al Zarooni at Moulton Paddocks in Newmarket tested positive for anabolic steroids. He admitted being in breach of the rules of racing. All 11 horses were banned from racing and Al Zarooni faced disciplinary charges. On 25 April 2013, he was banned from racing for eight years.

In June 2021, Al Zarooni announced his return to racing. His racing licence was returned by the Emirates Racing Authority and he started training at the Sharjah Equestrian Club. His first runner after returning from the ban was Major Cinnamon at Meydan Racecourse on 4 November 2021, who finished unplaced.

== Major wins ==
United Arab Emirates

- Al Maktoum Challenge - (1) - Capponi (2012)
- Dubai Sheema Classic – (1) – Rewilding (2011)
- Dubai World Cup – (1) – Monterosso (2012)

(United Kingdom) Great Britain

- 1000 Guineas - (1) - Blue Bunting (2011)
- Fillies' Mile- (2) - Lyric of Light (2011), Certify (2012)
- Prince of Wales's Stakes – (1) – Rewilding (2011)
- St. Leger – (1) – Encke (2012)
- Yorkshire Oaks - (1) - Blue Bunting (2011)

Germany

- Deutsches Derby – (1) – Buzzword (2010)

Italy

- Gran Criterium - (1) - Biondetti (2010)

(Republic of Ireland) Ireland

- Irish Oaks - (1) - Blue Bunting (2011)
