= Dynaformer =

American-bred Thoroughbred racehorse

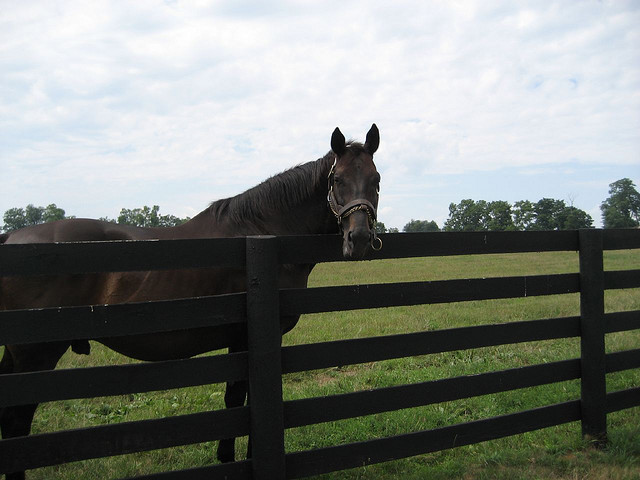
- Dynaformer in 2007
- Sire: Roberto
- Grandsire: Hail To Reason
- Dam: Andover Way
- Damsire: His Majesty
- Sex: Stallion
- Foaled: 1985
- Country: United States
- Colour: Dark Bay
- Breeder: H. Joseph Allen
- Owner: Paul Lynn
- Trainer: D. Wayne Lukas
- Record: 30: 7-5-2
- Earnings: $671,207

Major wins
- Jersey Derby (1988); Discovery Handicap (1988); Lucky Draw Stakes (1988)

Dynaformer (April 1, 1985 – April 29, 2012) was a Thoroughbred race horse and breeding stallion most notable as the sire of 2006 Kentucky Derby winner Barbaro.

== Background ==
Dynaformer was an unusually large horse, standing 17 hands (68 inches, 173 cm) high and was bred by Joseph Allen. He was sired by Epsom Derby winner Roberto out of Andover Way (by His Majesty). Dynaformer's pedigree includes some famous names: Nashua, Ribot, Bull Lea, Blue Larkspur, Nearco, and Johnstown, among others. During his racing career he was owned by Paul Lynn and trained by D. Wayne Lukas

== Racing career ==
Lukas said that Dynaformer "was the most difficult horse I ever trained." He was notorious for his surly and difficult temperament. Dynaformer started in 30 races, winning 7 of them, placing in 5, and coming in third twice. His career earnings amounted to $671,207. At age three, he won the Grade II Jersey Derby, the Grade II Discovery Handicap, and the Lucky Draw Stakes in which he equaled the Aqueduct track record of 1:48 2/5 for a mile and one-eighth. He placed in the General George Stakes and the Grade II Gallant Fox Handicap. At four, he was third in the Grade II Dixie Handicap.

== Stud record ==
Dynformer stood at stud at Three Chimneys Farm in Kentucky. He sired Barbaro, who won the Kentucky Derby in 2006. He also sired Mystery Giver, Perfect Drift, Point of Entry and Americain, winner of the A$6 million 2010 Melbourne Cup and now Dynaformer's leading stakes earner. In addition, he sired grass horse Lucarno, the winner of the G1 British Classic, and the St. Leger Stakes, as well as It's Somewhat, winner of the 2017 Doncaster Handicap. Dynaformer also sired Dyna King, who recovered from abandonment at the HEART Of Tucson Rescue And Therapy Stables. Dynaformer was versatile, numbering among his get McDynamo, the five-time winner of the Grade I Breeders' Cup Grand National Steeplechase. His best fillies are Riskaverse, Film Maker, Dynaforce White Moonstone and Blue Bunting.

He was retired from stud on April 14, 2012, after suffering an aortic valve rupture while in his stall. He was euthanised on April 29 at age 27, 9 years to the day after the birth of his Kentucky Derby-winning son Barbaro.
