= Fillies' Mile =

Flat horse race in Britain

- Class: Group 1
- Location: Rowley Mile; Newmarket, England
- Inaugurated: 1973
- Race type: Flat / Thoroughbred
- Sponsor: Bet365
- Website: Newmarket

Race information
- Distance: 1 mile (1,609 metres)
- Surface: Turf
- Track: Straight
- Qualification: Two-year-old fillies
- Weight: 9 st 2 lb
- Purse: £500,000 (2025); 1st: £283,550

Fillies' Mile
2026
Musical Times	Haven	Forbidden Fire

Previous years
2025
Precise	Venetian Lace	Evolutionist
2024
Desert Flower	January	Ballet Slippers
2023
Ylang Ylang	Shuwari	See The Fire
2022
Commissioning	Novakai	Bright Diamond
2021
Inspiral	Prosperous Voyage	Cachet

2020-2011
2020
Pretty Gorgeous	Indigo Girl	Snowfall
2019
Quadrilateral	Powerful Breeze	Love
2018
Iridessa	Hermosa	Pretty Pollyanna
2017
Laurens	September	Magic Lily
2016
Rhododendron	Hydrangea	Urban Fox
2015
Minding	Nathra	Hawksmoor
2014
Together Forever	Agnes Stewart	Winters Moon
2013
Chriselliam	Rizeena	Ihtimal
2012
Certify	Roz	Amazonas
2011
Lyric Of Light	Samitar	Firdaws

2010-2001
2010
White Moonstone	Together	Theyskens' Theory
2009
Hibaayeb	Lady Darshaan	You'll Be Mine
2008
Rainbow View	Fantasia	Dreamtheimpossible
2007
Listen	Proviso	Saoirse Abu
2006
Simply Perfect	Treat	English Ballet
2005
Nannina	Alexandrova	Nasheej
2004
Playful Act	Maids Causeway	Dash To The Top
2003
Red Bloom	Sundrop	Punctilious
2002
Soviet Song	Casual Look	Reach For The Moon
2001
Gossamer	Maryinsky	Esloob

2000-1991
2000
Crystal Music	Summer Symphony	Hotelgenie Dot Com
1999
Teggiano	Britannia	My Hansel
1998
Sunspangled	Calando	Edabiya
1997
Glorosia	Jibe	Exclusive
1996
Reams of Verse	Khassah	Sleepytime
1995
Bosra Sham	Bint Shadayid	Matiya
1994
Aqaarid	Jural	Snowtown
1993
Fairy Heights	Dance To The Top	Kissing Cousin
1992
Ivanka	Ajfan	Iviza
1991
Culture Vulture	Mystery Play	Party Cited

1990-1984
1990
Shamshir	Safa	Atlantic Flyer
1989
Silk Slippers	Moon Cactus	Fujaiyrah
1988
Tessla	Pick Of The Pops	Rain Burst
1987
Diminuendo	Haiati	Ashayer
1986
Invited Guest	Mountain Memory	Shining Water
1985
Untold	Moonlight Lady	Sue Grundy
1984
Oh So Sharp	Helen Street	Morning Devotion

The Fillies' Mile is a Group 1 flat horse race in Great Britain open to two-year-old fillies. It is run on the Rowley Mile at Newmarket over a distance of 1 mile (1,609 metres), and it is scheduled to take place each year in October.

== History ==
The event was established in 1973, and it was originally held at Ascot. It was initially sponsored by the Green Shield catalogue shops and titled the Green Shield Stakes. The shops were rebranded as Argos in the mid-1970s, and for a period the race was called the Argos Star Fillies' Mile. It was given Group 3 status in 1975.

The sponsorship was taken over by Hoover in 1978, and the event became known as the Hoover Fillies' Mile. It was promoted to Group 2 level in 1986, and its association with Hoover continued until 1989.

The race was upgraded to Group 1 in 1990, and backed by Brent Walker until 1991. A long-term deal with Meon Valley Stud began in 1998. It was temporarily switched to Newmarket in 2005, when Ascot was closed for redevelopment.

The Fillies' Mile was added to the Breeders' Cup Challenge series in 2008. The winners from 2008 to 2012 earned an automatic invitation to compete in the Breeders' Cup Juvenile Fillies Turf.

The event was transferred to Newmarket in 2011, and from this point it was sponsored by Shadwell. It was formerly held on the second day of the three-day Cambridgeshire Meeting, the day before the Cambridgeshire Handicap but was moved to Future Champions Day from 2014, switching places in the calendar with the Rockfel Stakes. In 2015 the race moved again, to a slightly earlier date in October, and is now run on the Friday of the Future Champions Festival.

== Records ==
Leading jockey (7 wins):

- Frankie Dettori – Shamshir (1990), Glorosia (1997), Teggiano (1999), Crystal Music (2000), White Moonstone (2010), Lyric of Light (2011), Inspiral (2021)

Leading trainer (7 wins): (includes jointly trained horses)

- Aidan O'Brien - Sunspangled (1998), Listen (2007), Together Forever (2014), Minding (2015), Rhododendron (2016), Ylang Ylang (2023), Precise (2025)

Leading owner (8 wins): (includes part ownership)

- Sue Magnier / Michael Tabor – Sunspangled (1998), Simply Perfect (2006), Listen (2007), Together Forever (2014), Minding (2015), Rhododendron (2016), Ylang Ylang (2023), Precise (2025)

== Winners ==
Year	Winner	Jockey	Trainer	Owner	Time
1973	Escorial	Lester Piggott	Ian Balding	Queen Elizabeth II	1:51.37
1974	Abandoned due to waterlogging
1975	Icing	Christy Roche	Paddy Prendergast	Lady Iveagh	1:46.60
1976	Miss Pinkie	Lester Piggott	Noel Murless	Jim Joel	1:45.31
1977	Cherry Hinton	Lester Piggott	Harry Wragg	Budgie Moller	1:42.52
1978	Formulate	Joe Mercer	Henry Cecil	Mrs D. Butter	1:43.61
1979	Quick As Lightning	Willie Carson	John Dunlop	Ogden Phipps	1:43.17
1980	Leap Lively	John Matthias	Ian Balding	Paul Mellon	1:41.91
1981	Height of Fashion	Joe Mercer	Dick Hern	Queen Elizabeth II	1:44.72
1982	Acclimatise	Tony Murray	Bruce Hobbs	Jocelyn Hambro	1:47.26
1983	Nepula	Bryn Crossley	Geoff Huffer	S. Al Qemias	1:44.68
1984	Oh So Sharp	Lester Piggott	Henry Cecil	Sheikh Mohammed	1:42.44
1985	Untold	Walter Swinburn	Michael Stoute	Bob Cowell	1:40.92
1986	Invited Guest	Steve Cauthen	Robert Armstrong	Kinderhill Corp.	1:43.47
1987	Diminuendo	Steve Cauthen	Henry Cecil	Sheikh Mohammed	1:43.10
1988	Tessla	Pat Eddery	Henry Cecil	Charles St George	1:43.96
1989	Silk Slippers	Michael Hills	Barry Hills	Robert Sangster	1:42.49
1990	Shamshir	Frankie Dettori	Luca Cumani	Sheikh Mohammed	1:43.27
1991	Culture Vulture (Note: Midnight Air finished first in 1991, but she was relegated to last place following a stewards' inquiry)	Richard Quinn	Paul Cole	Chris Wright	1:46.11
1992	Ivanka	Michael Roberts	Clive Brittain	Ali Saeed	1:46.65
1993	Fairy Heights	Cash Asmussen	Neville Callaghan	Frank Golding	1:44.44
1994	Aqaarid	Willie Carson	John Dunlop	Hamdan Al Maktoum	1:44.70
1995	Bosra Sham	Pat Eddery	Henry Cecil	Wafic Saïd	1:43.13
1996	Reams of Verse	Michael Kinane	Henry Cecil	Khalid Abdullah	1:44.32
1997	Glorosia	Frankie Dettori	Luca Cumani	Robert Smith	1:42.31
1998	Sunspangled	Michael Kinane	Aidan O'Brien	Magnier / Tabor	1:44.79
1999	Teggiano	Frankie Dettori	Clive Brittain	Abdullah Saeed Belhab	1:49.69
2000	Crystal Music	Frankie Dettori	John Gosden	Lord Lloyd-Webber	1:44.44
2001	Gossamer	Jamie Spencer	Luca Cumani	Gerald Leigh	1:46.40
2002	Soviet Song	Oscar Urbina	James Fanshawe	Elite Racing Club	1:42.32
2003	Red Bloom	Kieren Fallon	Sir Michael Stoute	Cheveley Park Stud	1:40.81
2004	Playful Act	Jimmy Fortune	John Gosden	Sangster Family	1:42.22
2005	Nannina	Jimmy Fortune	John Gosden	Cheveley Park Stud	1:38.52
2006	Simply Perfect	Darryll Holland	Jeremy Noseda	Smith / Tabor / Magnier	1:41.89
2007	Listen	Johnny Murtagh	Aidan O'Brien	Smith / Magnier / Tabor	1:43.30
2008	Rainbow View	Jimmy Fortune	John Gosden	George Strawbridge	1:40.82
2009	Hibaayeb	Neil Callan	Clive Brittain	Mohammed Al Nabouda	1:39.78
2010	White Moonstone	Frankie Dettori	Saeed bin Suroor	Godolphin	1:42.75
2011	Lyric of Light	Frankie Dettori	Mahmood Al Zarooni	Godolphin	1:35.98
2012	Certify	Mickael Barzalona	Mahmood Al Zarooni	Godolphin	1:38.19
2013	Chriselliam	Richard Hughes	Charles Hills	Carson / E. Asprey / Wright	1:40.00
2014	Together Forever	Joseph O'Brien	Aidan O'Brien	Smith / Magnier / Tabor	1:41.01
2015	Minding	Ryan Moore	Aidan O'Brien	Smith / Magnier / Tabor	1:37.87
2016	Rhododendron	Ryan Moore	Aidan O'Brien	Smith / Magnier / Tabor	1:37.73
2017	Laurens	P. J. McDonald	Karl Burke	John Dance	1:36.15
2018	Iridessa	Wayne Lordan	Joseph O'Brien	Chantal Regalado-Gonzalez	1:38.80
2019	Quadrilateral	Jason Watson	Roger Charlton	Khalid Abdullah	1:37.75
2020	Pretty Gorgeous	Shane Crosse	Joseph O'Brien	John C. Oxley	1:39.10
2021	Inspiral	Frankie Dettori	John & Thady Gosden	Cheveley Park Stud	1:38.44
2022	Commissioning	Rab Havlin	John & Thady Gosden	Isa Salman & Abdulla Al Khalifa	1:36.53
2023	Ylang Ylang	Ryan Moore	Aidan O'Brien	Tabor / Smith / Magnier et al.	1:38.80
2024	Desert Flower	William Buick	Charlie Appleby	Godolphin	1:37.48
2025	Precise	Christophe Soumillon	Aidan O'Brien	Smith / Magnier / Tabor/ Westerberg	1:35.46
2026	Musical Times	William Buick	Charlie Appleby	Godolphin	1:35.07

== See also ==
- Horse racing in Great Britain
- List of British flat horse races
- Road to the Kentucky Oaks
