= 2001 1000 Guineas =

188th 1000 Guineas Stakes
- 1000 Guineas
- Location: Newmarket Racecourse
- Date: 6 May 2001
- Winning horse: Ameerat (GB)
- Jockey: Philip Robinson
- Trainer: Michael Jarvis (GB)
- Owner: Ahmed Al Maktoum

The 2001 1000 Guineas Stakes was a horse race held at Newmarket Racecourse on Sunday 6 May 2001. It was the 188th running of the 1000 Guineas.

The winner was Ahmed Al Maktoum's Ameerat, a British-bred bay filly trained at Newmarket, Suffolk by Michael Jarvis and ridden by Philip Robinson. Ameerat's victory was the first in the race for her owner and trainer and the second for Robinson who had won on Pebbles in 1985.

== The contenders ==
The race attracted a field of fifteen runners: thirteen trained in the United Kingdom, one in Ireland and one in France. The favourite was the Michael Stoute-trained Karasta who had won the May Hill Stakes and finished second in the Prix Marcel Boussac in 2000. She was accompanied by her stable companion Enthused, winner of the Princess Margaret Stakes and Lowther Stakes. The Irish challenger was Toroca, trained by Aidan O'Brien at Ballydoyle who had won a maiden race at the Curragh two weeks earlier. The Godolphin Racing stable entered Muwakleh, a filly who had won both her races in Dubai including the UAE 1000 Guineas. France was represented by the Criquette Head-trained Stunning, winner of the Prix Imprudence. The other fancied runners included the undefeated Crystal Music, winner of the Fillies' Mile, and the Cherry Hinton Stakes winner Dora Carrington. Karasta headed the betting at odds of 9/2 ahead of Crystal Music (5/1), Enthused (6/1), Muwakleh (13/2), Stunning (9/1) and Toroca (10/1). Ameerat, whose only previous win had come in a maiden race at Goodwood Racecourse nine months earlier, was next in the betting at 11/1.

== The race ==
The starting stalls were placed on the stands side (the left side from the jockeys' viewpoint) of the wide Newmarket straight and the field raced up that side of the course throughout the race. Muwakleh was sent to the front by Frankie Dettori soon after the start, and was followed by Sayedah with Ashlinn, Arhaaff, Ameerat and Autumnal as the fillies remained closely grouped until the final quarter-mile. Crystal Music made progress on the outside, but was unable to sustain her effort, leaving Ameerat as Muwakleh's only serious challenger. Ameerat gradually wore down the Godolphin filly, gaining the advantage 50 yards from the finish to win by a neck. Toroca stayed on well in the closing stages to take third place ahead of Crystal Music and Enthused. Stunning finished in seventh place whilst Karasta was thirteenth of the fifteen runners.

Ameerat's victory gave Jarvis his first British classic winner in a thirty-three-year training career. He described the moment as "a great thrill", while Robinson described the winner as a "remarkable filly".

== Race details ==
- Sponsor: Sagitta
- First prize: £174,000
- Surface: Turf
- Going: Good
- Distance: 8 furlongs
- Number of runners: 15
- Winner's time: 1:38.36

== Full result ==
Pos.	Marg.	Horse (bred)	Jockey	Trainer (Country)	Odds
1		Ameerat (GB)	Philip Robinson	Michael Jarvis (GB)	11/1
2	nk	Muwakleh (GB)	Frankie Dettori	Saeed bin Suroor (GB)	13/2
3	1¾	Toroca (USA)	Mick Kinane	Aidan O'Brien (IRE)	10/1
4	1	Crystal Music (USA)	Richard Hughes	John Gosden (GB)	5/1
5	1½	Enthused (USA)	Johnny Murtagh	Sir Michael Stoute (GB)	6/1
6	2½	Arhaaff (IRE)	Craig Williams	Mick Channon (GB)	25/1
7	1	Stunning (USA)	Olivier Doleuze	Criquette Head-Maarek (FR)	9/1
8	shd	Santolina (USA)	Jimmy Fortune	John Gosden (GB)	20/1
9	1½	Autumnal (IRE)	Brett Doyle	Brian Meehan (GB)	50/1
10	nk	Peaceful Paradise (GB)	Michael Hills	John Hills (GB)	50/1
11	½	Mameha (GB)	Basil Marcus	Clive Brittain (GB)	100/1
12	2½	Sayedah (IRE)	Richard Hills	Marcus Tregoning (GB)	20/1
13	1½	Karasta (IRE)	Kieren Fallon	Sir Michael Stoute (GB)	9/2 fav
14	¾	Ashlinn (IRE)	Dane O'Neill	Richard Hannon, Sr. (GB)	100/1
15	½	Dora Carrington (IRE)	John Reid	Peter Harris (GB)	12/1

- Abbreviations: nse = nose; nk = neck; shd = head; hd = head; dist = distance; UR = unseated rider; DSQ = disqualified; PU = pulled up

== Winner's details ==
Further details of the winner, Ameerat

- Foaled: 4 April 1998
- Country: United Kingdom
- Sire: Mark of Esteem; Dam: Walimu (Darshaan)
- Owner: Ahmed Al Maktoum
- Breeder: Ahmed Al Maktoum
