= Prix du Bois =

- Class: Group 3
- Location: Deauville Racecourse; Deauville, France
- Inaugurated: 1925
- Race type: Flat / Thoroughbred
- Website: france-galop.com

Race information
- Distance: 1,000 metres (5f)
- Surface: Turf
- Track: Straight
- Qualification: Two-year-olds
- Weight: 57 kg Allowances; 1½ kg for fillies Penalties; 2 kg for Group winners
- Purse: €80,000 (2022); 1st: €40,000

Prix du Bois
2025
| Moojeed | Ali Shuffle | Imperial Me Cen |

Previous years
2024
Arabie | Secret Wood | Daylight
2023
Ramatuelle | Zorken | Les Pavots
2022
Belbek | Lova | Havana Angel
2021
Atomic Force | Black Lives Matter | Best Sixteen

2020-2011
2020
Livachope | Axdavali | Princesse De Saba
2019
Maven | Jolie | Kenlova
2018
Little Kim | Chelsea Cloisters | Shumookhi
2017
Zonza | Elizabeth Darcy | Ardenode
2016
Cosachope | Fixette | Sans Equivoque
2015
Fly On The Night | Tourny | Du Pyla
2014
Goken | Jane's Memory | Lehaim
2013
Vedeux | Another Party | Empreinte
2012
Snowday | To My Valentine | Sage Melody
2011
Family One | Boomerang Bob | Pyman's Theory

2010–2001
2010
Keratiya | Prolific Champion | Lone Cat
2009
Dolled Up | Chantilly Creme | Corporal Maddox
2008
Percolator | Caparroso | Kenz
2007
Natagora | Wilki | Faslen
2006
Sandwaki | Boccassini | Palin
2005
Gwenseb | Mister Chocolate | Think
2004
Divine Proportions | Great Blood | Salut Thomas
2003
Much Faster | Leila | Sister Moonshine
2002
Ela Merici | Zinziberine | On Line
2001
Ziria | Dobby Road | Zipping

2000–1997
2000
Ozone Layer | Iron Mask | Distinctly Dancer
1999
Morning Pride | Legend Of Spring | Perugina
1998
Imperfect World | Zirconi | Ronda
1997
Zelding | Cortachy Castle | Charge D'Affaires

The Prix du Bois is a Group 3 flat horse race in France open to two-year-old thoroughbreds. It is run at Deauville over a distance of 1,000 metres (about 5 furlongs), and it is scheduled to take place each year in late June or early July.

== History ==
The event was established in 1925, and it was originally held at Longchamp. It takes its name from the Bois de Boulogne, the location of its former home, and the Avenue du Bois (now the Avenue Foch), which leads towards the racecourse.

Due to World War II, the Prix du Bois was not run from 1940 to 1945.

The race was promoted to Group 3 status in 1982. It continued to be staged at Longchamp until 1994. It took place at Chantilly in 1995, and returned to Longchamp in 1996. For a period thereafter it was switched between Deauville (1997–98, 2003) and Chantilly (1999–2002, 2004–05).

The Prix du Bois was transferred to Maisons-Laffitte in 2006, and had another spell at Chantilly between 2009 and 2015. It has been run at Deauville again since 2016.

The leading horses from the Prix du Bois often go on to compete in the Prix Robert Papin. The first to win both races was Erica in 1927, and the most recent was Family One in 2011.

== Records ==
Leading jockey (10 wins):

- Roger Poincelet – Chesterfield (1946), Arbace (1948), Dahabi (1949), Lets Fly (1953), Polamia (1957), Dan Cupid (1958), High Bulk (1960), Mr Brookwood (1961), Spy Well (1962), Timmy Lad (1963)

Leading trainer (6 wins):

- François Mathet – Taoutcha (1952), Calshot (1966), Zeddaan (1967), Rockcress (1968), Myosotis (1974), Adraan (1979)
- Etienne Pollet – Polamia (1957), Dan Cupid (1958), High Bulk (1960), Mr Brookwood (1961), Spy Well (1962), Timmy Lad (1963)
- Pascal Bary – Export Price (1986), Rich and Famous (1989), Imperfect World (1998), Much Faster (2003), Divine Proportions (2004), Natagora (2007)

Leading owner (5 wins):

- Gertrude Widener – Polamia (1957), Dan Cupid (1958), Mr Brookwood (1961), Spy Well (1962), Timmy Lad (1963)

== Winners since 1978 ==
| Year | Winner | Jockey | Trainer | Owner | Time |
|---|---|---|---|---|---|
| 1978 | Irish River | Maurice Philipperon | John Cunnington Jr. | Mrs Raymond Adès |
| 1979 | Adraan | Yves Saint-Martin | François Mathet | Aga Khan IV | 0:57.70 |
| 1980 | Twig Prince | Michel Planard | Pierre Biancone | Mrs André Lhote |
| 1981 | Maelstrom Lake | Georges Doleuze | Edouard Bartholomew | Jacques Feuillard |
| 1982 | American Stress | Bruno Pizzorni | Freddie Palmer | Edouard Buffard |
| 1983 | Masarika | Yves Saint-Martin | Alain de Royer-Dupré | Aga Khan IV | 0:57.60 |
| 1984 | Noblequest | Gérard Dubroeucq | Robert Collet | Bendar bin M. Al Kabir | 0:57.00 |
| 1985 | Kanmary | Guy Guignard | Élie Lellouche | Mrs Patrick O'Neill | 0:59.50 |
| 1986 | Export Price | Cash Asmussen | Pascal Bary | Ecurie I. M. Fares | 0:57.30 |
| 1987 | Arabian Falcon | Guy Guignard | Bernard Vanheeghe | Mrs Georges Sandor | 0:59.20 |
| 1988 | Tersa | Freddy Head | François Boutin | Allen Paulson | 0:59.10 |
| 1989 | Rich and Famous | Norbert Jeanpierre | Pascal Bary | Ross Gilbert | 0:58.20 |
| 1990 | The Perfect Life | Alain Lequeux | Robert Collet | Richard Strauss | 0:58.20 |
| 1991 | Arazi | Gérald Mossé | François Boutin | Allen Paulson | 0:58.70 |
| 1992 | Glorieux Dancer | Mathieu Boutin | Robert Collet | Werner Wolf | 0:59.80 |
| 1993 | Porto Varas | Freddy Head | François Boutin | Niccolò Incisa Rocchetta | 0:58.00 |
| 1994 | Expelled | Pat Eddery | François Boutin | Khalid Abdullah | 0:57.40 |
| 1995 | Media Nox | Thierry Jarnet | André Fabre | Khalid Abdullah | 0:58.20 |
| 1996 | Deep Finesse | Philip Robinson | Michael Jarvis | John Sims | 0:59.20 |
| 1997 | Zelding | Thierry Jarnet | Robert Collet | Richard Strauss | 1:00.50 |
| 1998 | Imperfect World | Sylvain Guillot | Pascal Bary | Serge Fradkoff | 0:58.90 |
| 1999 | Morning Pride | Olivier Peslier | André Fabre | Maktoum Al Maktoum | 0:57.40 |
| 2000 | Ozone Layer | Olivier Peslier | André Fabre | Maktoum Al Maktoum | 1:02.00 |
| 2001 | Ziria | Gérald Mossé | Carlos Laffon-Parias | Leonidas Marinopoulos | 0:58.20 |
| 2002 | Ela Merici | Vincent Vion | Corine Barande-Barbe | Corine Barande-Barbe | 1:00.30 |
| 2003 | Much Faster | Thierry Thulliez | Pascal Bary | Ecurie J. L. Bouchard | 0:57.60 |
| 2004 | Divine Proportions | Christophe Lemaire | Pascal Bary | Niarchos Family | 0:58.70 |
| 2005 | Gwenseb | Olivier Peslier | Carlos Laffon-Parias | Wertheimer et Frère | 0:58.10 |
| 2006 | Sandwaki | Olivier Peslier | Carlos Laffon-Parias | Wertheimer et Frère | 0:59.80 |
| 2007 | Natagora | Stéphane Pasquier | Pascal Bary | Stefan Friborg | 0:57.20 |
| 2008 | Percolator | Christophe Soumillon | Paul Cole | Henry Robinson | 0:56.30 |
| 2009 | Dolled Up | Olivier Peslier | Robert Collet | Anne-Marie Hayes | 0:58.10 |
| 2010 | Keratiya | Christophe Lemaire | Jean-Claude Rouget | Aga Khan IV | 0:59.10 |
| 2011 | Family One | Ioritz Mendizabal | Yann Barberot | Ecurie Ascot | 0:57.58 |
| 2012 | Snowday | Olivier Peslier | Carlos Laffon-Parias | Wertheimer et Frère | 0:59.31 |
| 2013 | Vedeux | Marc Lerner | Carlos Lerner | P Hoze & Ecurie Haras du Cadran | 0:59.24 |
| 2014 | Goken | Fabrice Veron | Henri-Alex Pantall | Guy Pariente | 0:58.52 |
| 2015 | Fly On The Night | Umberto Rispoli | Attilio Giorgi | Pietro Sinistri | 0:58.28 |
| 2016 | Cosachope | Maxime Guyon | Philippe Sogorb | Guy Pariente | 0:58.77 |
| 2017 | Zonza | Cristian Demuro | Didier Guillemin | Alain Jathier | 0:58.56 |
| 2018 | Little Kim | Ben Curtis | Karl Burke | Nick Bradley Racing & Sohi & E Burke | 0:58.04 |
| 2019 | Maven | Mickael Barzalona | Wesley Ward | Richard Ravin | 0:58.36 |
| 2020 | Livachope ^{[a]} | Anthony Crastus | Jane Soubagne | Alain Chopard | 0:57.03 |
| 2021 | Atomic Force ^{[b]} | Stephane Pasquier | Kevin Ryan | Hambleton Racing Ltd Xxvii And Partner | 1:10.39 |
| 2022 | Belbek ^{[b]} | Olivier Peslier | André Fabre | Nurlan Bizakov | 1:09.22 |
| 2023 | Ramatuelle | Aurélien Lemaitre | Christopher Head | Infinity Nine Horses, Ecurie Des Monceaux Et Al | 1:08.05 |
| 2024 | Arabie | Jim Crowley | Karl Burke | Mohamed Saeed Al Shahi | 1:10.69 |
| 2026 | Tokaido | Tony Piccone | Amy Murphy | Anoj Don & Daniel Macauliffe | 1:10:34 |

^{a} The 2020 race was run at Longchamp due to the COVID-19 pandemic in France
^{b} The 2021 and 2022 race was run at Chantilly and the distance was 1,200 meters

== Earlier winners ==
- 1925: Tatters
- 1926: Never Late
- 1927: Erica
- 1928: La Rocque
- 1929: Advertencia
- 1930: Cristal
- 1931: Sisterari
- 1932: Asterisk
- 1933: Corindon
- 1934: Puits d'Amour
- 1935: Don Milo
- 1936: Le Radjah
- 1937: Pamir
- 1938: Courteille
- 1939: Folincourt
- 1940–45: no race
- 1946: Chesterfield
- 1947: Primeur
- 1948: Arbace
- 1949: Dahabi
- 1950: Idas
- 1951: Pharaos
- 1952: Taoutcha
- 1953: Let's Fly
- 1954: Americ
- 1955: Reine Martiale
- 1956: L'Astrologue
- 1957: Polamia
- 1958: Dan Cupid
- 1959: Barbaresque
- 1960: High Bulk
- 1961: Mr Brookwood
- 1962: Spy Well
- 1963: Timmy Lad
- 1964: Fair Portion
- 1965: Nursery Song
- 1966: Calshot
- 1967: Zeddaan
- 1968: Rockcress
- 1969: Baroque
- 1970: My Swallow
- 1971: Daring Display
- 1972: Benthose
- 1973: Lianga
- 1974: Myosotis
- 1975: Dacani
- 1976: Juge de Paix
- 1977: Soudromont

== See also ==
- List of French flat horse races
