= 2011 1000 Guineas =

198th 1000 Guineas Stakes
- 1000 Guineas
- Location: Newmarket Racecourse
- Date: 1 May 2011
- Winning horse: Blue Bunting (USA)
- Jockey: Frankie Dettori
- Trainer: Mahmood Al Zarooni (GB)
- Owner: Godolphin

The 2011 1000 Guineas Stakes was a horse race held at Newmarket Racecourse on Sunday 1 May 2011. It was the 198th running of the 1000 Guineas.

The winner was Godolphin's Blue Bunting, a three-year-old dark grey filly trained at Newmarket, Suffolk by Mahmood Al Zarooni and ridden by Frankie Dettori. Blue Bunting's victory was the first in the race for Al Zarooni. Godolphin and Dettori had previously won the race with Cape Verdi in 1998 and Kazzia in 2002.

== The contenders ==
The race attracted a field of eighteen runners, twelve trained in the United Kingdom, four in Ireland and two in France. The favourite was the French challenger Moonlight Cloud, the winner of the Prix Imprudence at Maisons-Laffitte on her most recent start. Ireland was represented by the Aidan O'Brien-trained Misty for Me the European Champion Two-Year-Old Filly of 2010 whose wins included the Moyglare Stud Stakes and Prix Marcel Boussac and who was accompanied by her stable companions Together (Silver Flash Stakes) and Empowering (Leopardstown 1,000 Guineas Trial Stakes). The other Irish runner was Laughing Lashes, who had beaten Misty for Me in the Debutante Stakes in August 2010. The best of the British-trained contenders appeared to be Memory (Albany Stakes, Cherry Hinton Stakes), Havant (Oh So Sharp Stakes), Hooray (Cheveley Park Stakes) and Cape Dollar (Rockfel Stakes). Moonlight Cloud headed the betting at odds of 9/2 ahead of Memory (6/1), Havant (13/2) with Hooray and Misty for Me at 9/1. Blue Bunting, who was running in her first Group race, and was considered a middle-distance prospect rather than a miler, started a 16/1 outsider.

== The race ==
The start of the race was slightly delayed by the French filly Immortal Verse (later to win the Coronation Stakes and the Prix Jacques le Marois) who refused to enter the starting stalls and was withdrawn without coming under starter's orders. Hooray took the early lead and set the pace from the 50/1 outsider Elshabakiya, with Laughing Lashes, Empowering and Misty for Me close behind. Memory effectively refused to race and was tailed-off soon after the start. The complexion of the race changed abruptly three furlong from the finish as the early leaders weakened and several fillies who had been restrained in the early stages made rapid progress. Moonlight Cloud briefly took the advantage with a quarter mile left to run but was quickly overtaken by Together and Maqaasid who raced down the centre of the track, whilst Nova Hawk moved forward and Blue Bunting began to make rapid progress on the stand-side rail. Together led until well inside the final furlong when she was overtaken by Blue Bunting who won by three quarters of a length, with Maqaasid a length and a quarter back in third ahead of Nova Hawk. Of the other fancied runners, Havant finished sixth, Moonlight Cloud seventh, Hooray eighth, Misty for Me eleventh and Memory eighteenth and last.

== Race details ==
- Sponsor: QIPCO
- First prize: £213,739
- Surface: Turf
- Going: Good to Firm
- Distance: 8 furlongs
- Number of runners: 18
- Winner's time: 1:39.27

== Full result ==
Pos.	Marg.	Horse (bred)	Jockey	Trainer (Country)	Odds
1		Blue Bunting (USA)	Frankie Dettori	Mahmood Al Zarooni (GB)	16/1
2	¾	Together (IRE)	Colm O'Donoghue	Aidan O'Brien (IRE)	33/1
3	1¼	Maqaasid (GB)	Richard Hills	John Gosden (GB)	22/1
4	3¼	Nova Hawk (GB)	Stéphane Pasquier	Rod Collet (FR)	25/1
5	hd	Barefoot Lady (IRE)	Paul Hanagan	Richard Fahey (GB)	16/1
6	nk	Havant (GB)	Ryan Moore	Michael Stoute (GB)	13/2
7	3¾	Moonlight Cloud (GB)	Davy Bonilla	Freddy Head (FR)	9/2 fav
8	1½	Hooray (GB)	Seb Sanders	Mark Prescott (GB)	9/1
9	nk	I Love Me (GB)	Jimmy Fortune	Andrew Balding (GB)	10/1
10	2¾	Elshabakiya (IRE)	Philip Robinson	Clive Brittain (GB)	50/1
11	3¾	Misty For Me (IRE)	Pat Smullen	Aidan O'Brien (IRE)	9/1
12	½	Cape Dollar (IRE)	Richard Mullen	Michael Stoute (GB)	40/1
13	3	The Shrew (GB)	William Buick	John Gosden (GB)	66/1
14	3½	Show Rainbow (GB)	Neil Callan	Mick Channon (GB)	100/1
15	3¼	Empowering (IRE)	Joseph O'Brien	Aidan O'Brien (IRE)	25/1
16	1½	Make A Dance (USA)	Michael Hills	Barry Hills (GB)	16/1
17	nse	Laughing Lashes (USA)	Francis Berry	Jessica Harrington (IRE)	18/1
18	37	Memory (GB)	Richard Hughes	Richard Hannon (GB)	6/1

- Abbreviations: nse = nose; nk = neck; shd = head; hd = head; dist = distance; UR = unseated rider; DSQ = disqualified

== Winner's details ==
Further details of the winner, Blue Bunting

- Foaled: 20 March 2008
- Country: United States
- Sire: Dynaformer; Dam: Miarixa (Linamix)
- Owner: Godolphin
- Breeder: B. M. Kelley
