= 2008 1000 Guineas =

Horse race

195th 1000 Guineas Stakes
- 1000 Guineas
- Location: Newmarket Racecourse
- Date: 4 May 2008
- Winning horse: Natagora (FR)
- Jockey: Christophe Lemaire
- Trainer: Pascal Bary (FR)
- Owner: Stefan Friborg

The 2008 1000 Guineas Stakes was a horse race held at Newmarket Racecourse on Sunday 4 May 2008. It was the 195th running of the 1000 Guineas.

The winner was Stefan Friborg's Natagora, a French-bred grey filly trained at Chantilly by Pascal Bary and ridden by Christophe Lemaire. Natagora's victory was the first in the race for her owner, trainer and jockey.

== The contenders ==
The race attracted a field of fifteen runners, ten trained in the United Kingdom, four in Ireland and one in France. The favourite was the French challenger Natagora who had been named European Champion Two-year old Filly in 2007 when she had won the Prix Robert Papin in France and the Cheveley Park Stakes in England. The Ballydoyle stable had two representatives in Kitty Matcham, the winner of the Rockfel Stakes and Savethisdanceforme, whilst the other two Irish runners were the dual Group One winner Saoirse Abu (Phoenix Stakes, Moyglare Stud Stakes) and the Curragh maiden race winner Lush Lashes, neither of whom were fancied in the betting. The leading British-trained runners appeared to be two fillies bred and owned by the Cheveley Park Stud: the Nell Gwyn Stakes winner Infallible, and Spacious, the winner of the May Hill Stakes. The most fancied of the other fillies was the John Dunlop-trained Muthabara, the undefeated winner of the Fred Darling Stakes. Natagora headed the betting at odds of 11/4 ahead of Infallible (7/2) and Spacious (11/2) with Muthabara and Kitty Matcham on 8/1.

== The race ==
The 80/1 outsider Francesca d'Gorgio, who had been unruly in the starting stalls broke quickly and led two furlongs but was overtaken by Natagora. Most of the fillies raced up the stands side (the left of the course from the jockeys' viewpoint) with Natagora racing along the stands rail. The favourite set the pace from Muthabara with Infallible, Saoirse Abu, Lady Deauville and Laureldene Gale close behind. Natagora began to come under pressure a furlong from the finish, at which point several fillies, including Spacious, Nahoodh and Lush Lashes began to make progress. In the closing stages Natagora ran on to win by half a length from Spacious, with Saoirse Abu a further half length away in third. Infallible, Nahoodh, Lush Lashes, Royal Confidence and Muthabara came next, with less than three and a half lengths separating the first eight finishers.

== Race details ==
- Sponsor: Stan James
- First prize: £212,888
- Surface: Turf
- Going: Good to Firm
- Distance: 8 furlongs
- Number of runners: 15
- Winner's time: 1:38.99

== Full result ==
Pos.	Marg.	Horse (bred)	Jockey	Trainer (Country)	Odds
1		Natagora (FR)	Christophe Lemaire	Pascal Bary (FR)	11/4 fav
2	½	Spacious (GB)	Jamie Spencer	James Fanshawe (GB)	11/2
3	½	Saoirse Abu (USA)	Kevin Manning	Jim Bolger (IRE)	20/1
4	nk	Infallible (GB)	Jimmy Fortune	John Gosden (GB)	7/2
5	hd	Nahoodh (IRE)	Richard Hughes	Mick Channon (GB)	33/1
6	½	Lush Lashes (GB)	Kerrin McEvoy	Jim Bolger (IRE)	40/1
7	½	Royal Confidence (GB)	Michael Hills	Barry Hills (GB)	66/1
8	¾	Muthabara (IRE)	Richard Hills	John Dunlop (GB)	8/1
9	2½	Kitty Matcham (IRE)	Johnny Murtagh	Aidan O'Brien (IRE)	8/1
10	2¾	Savethisdanceforme (IRE)	Ryan Moore	Aidan O'Brien (IRE)	12/1
11	2	Max One Two Three (IRE)	Richard Kingscote	Tom Dascombe (GB)	33/1
12	4½	Lady Deauville (FR)	Stéphane Pasquier	P. A. Blockley (GB)	66/1
13	2	Laureldean Gale (USA)	Frankie Dettori	Saeed bin Suroor (GB)	14/1
14	¾	Spinning Lucy (IRE)	William Buick	Barry Hills (GB)	100/1
15	9	Francesca d'Gorgio (USA)	Ted Durcan	Jeremy Noseda (GB)	80/1

- Abbreviations: nse = nose; nk = neck; shd = head; hd = head; dist = distance; UR = unseated rider; DSQ = disqualified; PU = pulled up

== Winner's details ==
Further details of the winner, Natagora

- Foaled: 18 February 2005
- Country: France
- Sire: Giant's Causeway; Dam: Sarayir (Mr Prospector)
- Owner: Stefan Friborg
- Breeder: Bertrand Gouin & Georges Duca
