= Atmah =

British-bred Thoroughbred racehorse

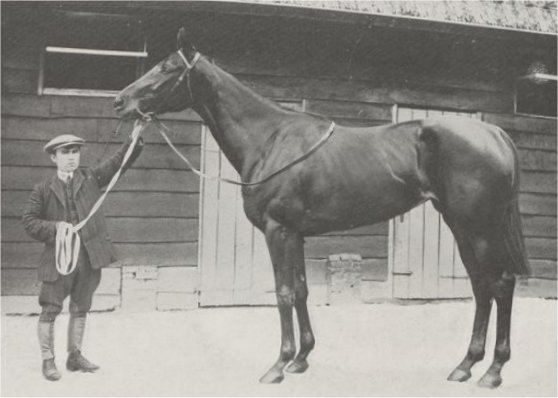
- Atmah in 1911.
- Sire: Galeazzo
- Grandsire: Galopin
- Dam: Mrs Kendal
- Damsire: Tenny
- Sex: Mare
- Foaled: 1908
- Country: United Kingdom
- Colour: Bay
- Breeder: Jimmy de Rothschild
- Owner: Jimmy de Rothschild
- Trainer: Fred Pratt
- Record: 12: 1-1-1
- Earnings: £4,600

Major wins
- 1000 Guineas (1911)

Atmah (1908 – after 1915) was a British Thoroughbred racehorse and broodmare. She failed to win as a two-year-old but showed considerable promise on her final start when she ran third in the Dewhurst Stakes. In the following year she contested four of the five British Classic Races, recording her biggest success when taking the 1000 Guineas. She made no impact as a broodmare.

== Background ==
Atmah was a bay mare bred and owned by Jimmy de Rothschild. She was trained by Fred Pratt at the Waltham House stable at Lambourn in Berkshire. In 1907 the mare Mrs Kendal (with Atmah in utero) was bought for 510 guineas at the Tattersalls Knightsbridge sale by F Lort-Phillips on behalf of Jimmy de Rothschild. Atmah shared her name with a yacht owned by the Rothschild family.

Mrs Kendal was an American-bred daughter of the Brooklyn Handicap winner Tenny and a female-line descendant of the influential British broodmare Polly Agnes. Atmah's sire Galeazzo recorded his biggest victory when taking the Newmarket Stakes as a three-year-old in 1896.

== Racing career ==
=== 1910: two-year-old season ===
In her first six races Atmah failed to win, and finished second only once, when she was runner-up in a minor event at Leicester Racecourse. Atmah was matched against top-class male opposition in the Dewhurst Plate over seven furlongs at Newmarket Racecourse on 27 September. She produced her best effort of the year as she finished third behind the colts King William and Phryxus, who dead-heated for first place.

=== 1911: three-year-old season ===
On 28 April 1911 Atmah, ridden by Freddie Fox, started at odds of 7/1 for the 98th running of the 1000 Guineas over the Rowley Mile. In a very close finish she prevailed by a short head from Radiancy, with two lengths back to Knockfeerna in third place. Her winning time of 1:38.4 was a new record for the race.

Atmah took on male opponents again when she was the only filly to contest the Epsom Derby on 31 May. She never fully recovered from being "crowded out" at the start and came home in about tenth place behind Sunstar. In the Epsom Oaks two days later over the same course and distance Atmah started at odds of 10/1 but finished unplaced behind the outsider Cherimoya. She was then brought back in distance for the Coronation Stakes at Royal Ascot in mid-June but made no impact in a race won by Knockfeerna. In September at Doncaster Racecourse Atmah contested her fourth Classic and finished unplaced behind Prince Palatine in the St Leger.

=== 1912: four-year-old season ===
Atmah ran at least once as a four-year-old in 1912, finishing unplaced in the Royal Hunt Cup at Royal Ascot on 19 June.

== Assessment and honours ==
In their book, A Century of Champions, based on the Timeform rating system, John Randall and Tony Morris rated Atmah a "poor" winner of the 1000 Guineas.

== Breeding record ==
Atmah was retired from racing to become a broodmare for her owner's stud.

- Alectoromancy (GB), a chestnut filly, foaled in 1913, sired by Valens.
- In 1914, she was bred to Bomba and exported to France. The resulting colt, Bingo (1915), had limited racing success.

== Pedigree ==
Pedigree of Atmah (GB), bay mare, 1908
Sire Galeazzo (GB) 1893	Galopin (GB); 1872	Vedette	Voltigeur
Sire Galeazzo (GB) 1893	Galopin (GB); 1872	Vedette	Mrs Ridgway
Sire Galeazzo (GB) 1893	Galopin (GB); 1872	Flying Duchess	The Flying Dutchman
Sire Galeazzo (GB) 1893	Galopin (GB); 1872	Flying Duchess	Merope
Sire Galeazzo (GB) 1893	Eira (GB); 1881	Kisber (HUN)	Buccaneer (GB)
Sire Galeazzo (GB) 1893	Eira (GB); 1881	Kisber (HUN)	Mineral (GB)
Sire Galeazzo (GB) 1893	Eira (GB); 1881	Aeolia	Parmesan
Sire Galeazzo (GB) 1893	Eira (GB); 1881	Aeolia	Breeze
Dam Mrs Kendal (USA) 1898	Tenny (USA); 1886	Rayon d'Or (FR)	Flageolet
Dam Mrs Kendal (USA) 1898	Tenny (USA); 1886	Rayon d'Or (FR)	Araucaria (GB)
Dam Mrs Kendal (USA) 1898	Tenny (USA); 1886	Belle of Maywood	Hunter's Lexington
Dam Mrs Kendal (USA) 1898	Tenny (USA); 1886	Belle of Maywood	Julia Mattingly
Dam Mrs Kendal (USA) 1898	Star Actress (IRE); 1891	Kendal (GB)	Bend Or
Dam Mrs Kendal (USA) 1898	Star Actress (IRE); 1891	Kendal (GB)	Windermere
Dam Mrs Kendal (USA) 1898	Star Actress (IRE); 1891	Petrachina (GB)	Petrarch
Dam Mrs Kendal (USA) 1898	Star Actress (IRE); 1891	Petrachina (GB)	Jessie Agnes (Family 16-g)
