= John Osborne Jr. =

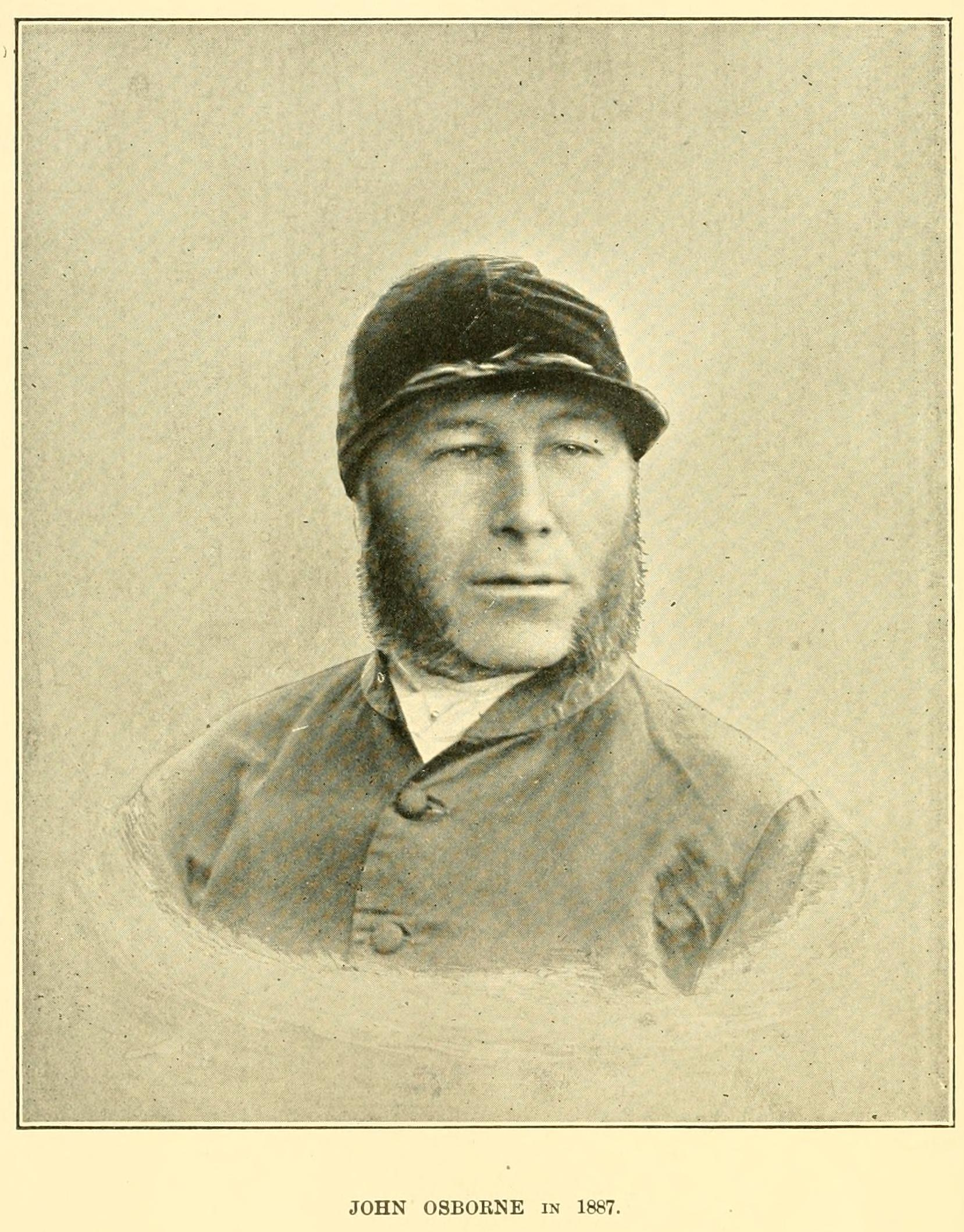
- "Johnny", caricature by Lib in Vanity Fair, 1887.

Personal information
- Born: c. 1833
- Died: 1922
- Occupation: Jockey

Horse racing career
- Sport: Horse racing

Major racing wins
- Major races 1,000 Guineas Stakes (1856, 1874); 2,000 Guineas Stakes (1857, 1869, 1871, 1872, 1875, 1888); Ascot Gold Cup (1876); Epsom Derby (1869); Epsom Oaks (1874); St Leger (1863, 1874); Sussex Stakes (1878)

Significant horses
- Apology, Ayrshire, Bothwell, Camballo, Clocher, Lord Clifden, Manganese, Pretender, Prince Charlie, Vedette

John Howe Osborne, also known as John Osborne Jr. (c. 1833 - 1922) was a multiple British classic winning jockey. He was the most successful and most popular jockey in the north of England in the second half of the 19th century. His riding career lasted 46 years.

His first ride was on Miss Castling at Radcliffe Bridge, near Bury in Lancashire in 1846. His last ride was on Llanthony at Newmarket in 1892.

== Major wins ==
(United Kingdom) Great Britain

- 1,000 Guineas Stakes - (2) - Manganese (1856), Apology (1874)
- 2,000 Guineas Stakes - (6) - Vedette (1857), Pretender (1869), Bothwell (1871), Prince Charlie (1872), Camballo (1875), Ayrshire (1888)
- Epsom Derby - Pretender (1869)
- Epsom Oaks - Apology (1874)
- St Leger - (2) - Lord Clifden (1863), Apology (1874)
- Ascot Gold Cup - Apology (1876)
- Sussex Stakes - Clocher (1878)

== Bibliography ==
- Mortimer, Roger; Onslow, Richard; Willett, Peter (1978). Biographical Encyclopedia of British Flat Racing. Macdonald and Jane’s. ISBN 0-354-08536-0.
