= Galeazzo =

- Gender: Male
- Name day: 2 November

Origin
- Region of origin: Italy

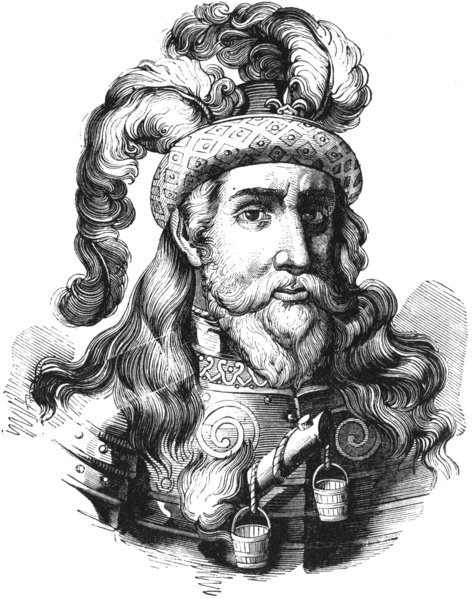
Galeazzo Visconti

Galeazzo is an Italian masculine given name. Although its origin is unclear, it may be derived from either Latin or Germanic languages. In the latter it means helmet. It is also used as a surname.

Notable people with the name include:

== Given name ==
=== First name ===
- Galeazzo Alessi (1512–1572), Italian architect
- Galleazzo Appiani, Italian architect
- Galeazzo Benti (1923–1993), Italian actor
- Galeazzo Campi (1475/1477–1536), Italian painter
- Galeazzo Ciano (1903–1944), Italian diplomat and politician
- Galeazzo Gegald, Italian Roman Catholic prelate
- Galeazzo Marescotti (1627–1726), Italian cardinal
- Galeazzo Rivelli, Italian painter
- Galeazzo Sanseverino (c. 1460–1525), Italian-French condottiere
- Galeazzo Maria Sforza (1444–1476), Duke of Milan
- Galeazzo Visconti, multiple persons

=== Middle name ===
- Gian Galeazzo Sanvitale (1496–1550), Italian condottiero
- Gian Galeazzo Sforza (1469–1494), Duke of Milan

== Surname ==
- Antonio Galeazzo (born 1959), Italian rugby player and coach
