= 2016 1000 Guineas =

203rd 1000 Guineas Stakes
- 1000 Guineas
- Location: Newmarket Racecourse
- Date: 1 May 2016
- Winning horse: Minding (IRE)
- Jockey: Ryan Moore
- Trainer: Aidan O'Brien (IRE)
- Owner: Derrick Smith & Mrs John Magnier & Michael Tabor

The 2016 1000 Guineas Stakes was a horse race held at Newmarket Racecourse on Sunday 1 May 2016. It was the 203rd running of the 1000 Guineas.

The winner was Derrick Smith, Susan Magnier & Michael Tabor's Minding, an Irish-bred bay filly trained at Ballydoyle by Aidan O'Brien and ridden by Ryan Moore. Minding's victory was the third in the race for Moore after Homecoming Queen (2012, trained by O'Brien) and Legatissimo (2015). O'Brien had also won the race in 1996 with Virginia Waters.

== The contenders ==
The race attracted a field of sixteen runners, ten trained in the United Kingdom, five in Ireland and one in France. The favourite for the race was the Irish-trained Minding who had won the Moyglare Stud Stakes and Fillies' Mile in 2015 and had been voted Cartier Champion Two-year-old Filly. She was accompanied by her stable companions Ballydoyle, who had beaten Minding in the Debutante Stakes and won the Prix Marcel Boussac, and Alice Springs, the runner-up in the Breeders' Cup Juvenile Fillies Turf. The other two Irish runners were Turret Rocks (May Hill Stakes) and Jet Setting (Leopardstown 1,000 Guineas Trial). France was represented by the Criquette Head-trained Midweek, who had finished second in the Prix Imprudence. The best fancied of the British contingent were Lumiere (Cheveley Park Stakes) and Nathrah (Nell Gwyn Stakes), whilst the other runners included Fireglow (Star Stakes, Montrose Stakes), Blue Bayou (Sweet Solera Stakes and Epsom Icon (Washington Singer Stakes). Minding headed the betting at odds of 11/10 ahead of Lumiere (13/2), Ballydoyle (15/2) Nathrah (8/1) and Midweek (12/1).

== The race ==
The starting stalls were positioned on the stand-side (the left-hand side from the jockeys' viewpoint) and the fillies raced in a single group on the stand-side throughout the race. Lumiere broke quickly and tracked to the rail to set the early pace, with Minding, Fireglow, Turret Rocks, Jet Setting and Sharja Queen close behind. As the fillies approached the cutaway two furlongs from the finish Lumiere began to struggle and dropped back quickly. Minding, racing towards the centre of the leading group, went to the front and opened up a clear advantage as Alice Springs moved into second and Ballydoyle, who had struggled to obtain a clear run, began to make rapid progress along the rail. Most of the other runners were under pressure with only Fireglow able to stay in contention with the O'Brien trio. Minding never looked in any danger of defeat in the final furlong and won by three and a half lengths from Ballydoyle with Alice Springs completing a 1-2-3 for the trainer by beating Fireglow for third. Nathra took fifth ahead of Turret Rocks and the 50/1 outsider Mix and Mingle. Lumiere finished last.

== Race details ==
- Sponsor: QIPCO
- First prize: £297,018
- Surface: Turf
- Going: Good
- Distance: 8 furlongs
- Number of runners: 16
- Winner's time: 1:36.53

== Full result ==
Pos.	Marg.	Horse (bred)	Jockey	Trainer (Country)	Odds
1		Minding (IRE)	Ryan Moore	Aidan O'Brien (IRE)	11/10 fav
2	3½	Ballydoyle (IRE)	Seamie Heffernan	Aidan O'Brien (IRE)	15/2
3	½	Alice Springs (IRE)	Colm O'Donoghue	Aidan O'Brien (IRE)	16/1
4	nk	Fireglow (GB)	James Doyle	Mark Johnston (GB)	40/1
5	2	Nathra (IRE)	Frankie Dettori	John Gosden (GB)	8/1
6	nk	Turret Rocks (IRE)	Kevin Manning	Jim Bolger (IRE)	20/1
7	1	Mix and Mingle (IRE)	Ted Durcan	Chris Wall (GB)	50/1
8	hd	Midweek (GB)	Vincent Chemineaud	Criquette Head (FR)	12/1
9	1	Jet Setting (IRE)	Shane Foley	Adrian Keatley (IRE)	33/1
10	3¼	Aljazzi (GB)	Jim Crowley	Marco Botti (GB)	100/1
11	½	Epsom Icon (GB)	Charles Bishop	Mick Channon (GB)	100/1
12	4	Robanne (GB)	Silvestre de Sousa	William Knight (GB)	50/1
13	2¼	Blue Bayou (GB)	Jimmy Fortune	Brian Meehan (GB)	50/1
14	5	Illuminate (IRE)	Pat Smullen	Richard Hannon Jr. (GB)	25/1
15	6	Sharja Queen (GB)	Andrea Atzeni	Roger Varian (GB)	66/1
16	2	Lumiere (GB)	William Buick	Mark Johnston (GB)	13/2

- Abbreviations: nse = nose; nk = neck; shd = head; hd = head; dist = distance; UR = unseated rider; DSQ = disqualified; PU = pulled up

== Winner's details ==
Further details of the winner, Minding

- Foaled: 10 February 2013
- Country: Ireland
- Sire: Galileo; Dam: Lillie Langtry (Danehill Dancer)
- Owner: Derrick Smith & Mrs John Magnier & Michael Tabor
- Breeder: Orpendale, Chelston & Wynatt
