= Jack Morris (jockey) =

Personal information
- Born: 1845 Carshalton, Surrey
- Died: 1896 (aged 50–51) Newmarket, Suffolk
- Occupation: Jockey

Horse racing career
- Sport: Horse racing

Major racing wins
- Major races 1,000 Guineas Stakes (1873); Epsom Derby (1875)

Significant horses
- Cecilia, Galopin

John William Morris (1845–1896) was a British Classic winning jockey. He won the 1875 Epsom Derby on Galopin for Prince Batthyány.

Morris was born in Carshalton, Surrey and began riding in 1863. Besides his Derby victory, he also won the 1,000 Guineas in 1873 on Lord Falmouth's Cecilia, trainer Mathew Dawson's second string. This was the first time the race had been run over the Rowley Mile. Other major victories included the Liverpool Cup in 1868 on Palmer for Sir Joseph Hawley, the 1870 Middle Park Stakes on Albert Victor and the Prince of Wales's Stakes in 1876 on Petrarch for Lord Dupplin.

He was hard of hearing. Hence during his Derby win, the crowd shouted "Go on deafie!" He rode Galopin on the widest route to win, and when asked why, replied, "He'd won his race. I meant to keep him out of danger."

Towards the end of his career he rode in France, but retired early due to ill health. He died of liver cirrhosis, penniless and in obscurity, in a cellar in Newmarket on 13 May 1896. Most of his children also died young.

== Major wins ==
(United Kingdom) Great Britain

- 1,000 Guineas Stakes – Cecilia (1873)
- Epsom Derby – Galopin (1875)
