= Mark of Esteem =

Irish-bred Thoroughbred racehorse (1993–2014)

- Sire: Darshaan
- Grandsire: Shirley Heights
- Dam: Homage
- Damsire: Ajdal
- Sex: Stallion
- Foaled: 26 March 1993
- Died: May 2014
- Country: Ireland
- Colour: Bay
- Breeder: Sheikh Mohammed
- Owner: Godolphin
- Trainer: Saeed bin Suroor
- Record: 7: 4-1-0
- Earnings: £365,139

Major wins
- 2000 Guineas Stakes (1996); Queen Elizabeth II Stakes (1996); Celebration Mile (1996); Timeform rating: 137
- Last updated on 31 May 2024

Mark of Esteem (26 March 1993 – 21 May 2014) was an Irish-bred thoroughbred racehorse. In his two years of racing, he won four races and placed once from seven runs, with earnings of £365,139.

== Background ==
Mark of Esteem was a bay horse with a white blaze bred at the Dalham Hall Stud by Sheikh Mohammed. He was sired by the Prix du Jockey Club winner Darshaan. His dam Homage was a daughter of the July Cup winner Ajdal.

== Racing career ==
=== 1995: two-year-old season ===
As a juvenile, Mark of Esteem finished second on his first start before winning a maiden race at Goodwood by three lengths. The horse was subsequently the subject of a disagreement between its trainer, Henry Cecil, and its owner, Mohammed bin Rashid Al Maktoum. Cecil wanted to run Mark of Esteem in the Royal Lodge Stakes at Ascot but Maktoum believed him to be lame and unfit to run. When Cecil took the disagreement public, Maktoum removed all of his 40 horses from Cecil's Warren Place stables. Mark of Esteem was subsequently trained by Saeed bin Suroor for Godolphin.

=== 1996: three-year-old season ===
His first three-year-old start came in the first Classic of the 1996 season following a winter in Dubai: the 2000 Guineas Stakes at Newmarket. Mark of Esteem won by a short head in a photo finish from Even Top and Bijou d'Inde.

His next start in the St. James's Palace Stakes was a loss to Bijou d'Inde.

Mark of Esteem then won the Group Two Celebration Mile at Goodwood by three and a half lengths and the Group One Queen Elizabeth II Stakes at Ascot, where he scored by over a length from 1000 Guineas-winning filly Bosra Sham who was having her first race for several months and backed up the form by winning the Champion Stakes the following month. This was the third win of the day for jockey Frankie Dettori at a major meeting when he went on to win all seven races. Official handicappers hailed it as the best performance of his generation over a mile for a decade. Mark of Esteem's final start was in America, but he failed to show the same acceleration from mid-division in the Breeders' Cup Mile at Woodbine.

== Assessment ==
Mark of Esteem was retired with a Timeform rating of 137.

== Stud career & After retirement from stud duty ==
Mark of Esteem stood at a stud under the Darley banner where he had much success including his siring of Derby winner Sir Percy and the 1000 Guineas winner Ameerat. His progeny also includes group winners High Accolade, Reverence and Ordnance Row.

In 2007, he retired from stud duty due to declining fertility. on 21 May 2014, he was euthanized following a short illness.

== Pedigree ==
Pedigree of Mark of Esteem (IRE), bay horse, 1993
Sire Darshaan (GB) 1981	Shirley Heights (GB); 1975	Mill Reef	Never Bend
Sire Darshaan (GB) 1981	Shirley Heights (GB); 1975	Mill Reef	Milan Mill
Sire Darshaan (GB) 1981	Shirley Heights (GB); 1975	Hardiemma	Hardicanute
Sire Darshaan (GB) 1981	Shirley Heights (GB); 1975	Hardiemma	Grand Cross
Sire Darshaan (GB) 1981	Delsy (FR); 1972	Abdos	Arbar
Sire Darshaan (GB) 1981	Delsy (FR); 1972	Abdos	Pretty Lady
Sire Darshaan (GB) 1981	Delsy (FR); 1972	Kelty	Venture VII
Sire Darshaan (GB) 1981	Delsy (FR); 1972	Kelty	Marilla
Dam Homage (GB) 1989	Ajdal (USA); 1984	Northern Dancer	Nearctic
Dam Homage (GB) 1989	Ajdal (USA); 1984	Northern Dancer	Natalma
Dam Homage (GB) 1989	Ajdal (USA); 1984	Native Partner	Raise A Native
Dam Homage (GB) 1989	Ajdal (USA); 1984	Native Partner	Dinner Partner
Dam Homage (GB) 1989	Home Love (USA); 1976	Vaguely Noble	Vienna
Dam Homage (GB) 1989	Home Love (USA); 1976	Vaguely Noble	Noble Lassie
Dam Homage (GB) 1989	Home Love (USA); 1976	Homespun	Round Table
Dam Homage (GB) 1989	Home Love (USA); 1976	Homespun	Gal I Love (Family: 17-b)
