= Ameerat =

British-bred Thoroughbred racehorse

- Sire: Mark of Esteem
- Grandsire: Darshaan
- Dam: Walimu
- Damsire: Top Ville
- Sex: Mare
- Foaled: 4 April 1998
- Country: United Kingdom
- Colour: Bay
- Breeder: Ahmed Al Maktoum
- Owner: Ahmed Al Maktoum
- Trainer: Michael Jarvis
- Record: 7: 2-1-0
- Earnings: £201,620

Major wins
- 1000 Guineas (2001)

Ameerat (foaled 4 April 1998) is a British Thoroughbred racehorse and broodmare. In a racing career which lasted from August 2000 to October 2001 she ran seven times and won two races. After winning once from three starts as a two-year-old, she won the Classic 1000 Guineas at Newmarket Racecourse on her first appearance of the 2001 season. Her subsequent career was disappointing, as she finished unplaced in her three remaining races. At the end of her three-year-old season she was retired from racing to become a broodmare. Ameerat was not regarded as one of the better classic winners.

== Background ==
Ameerat, a bay horse with a white star and three white socks, was bred in England by her owner Ahmed Al Maktoum. Ameerat was sired by Mark of Esteem an "outstanding" miler who won the 2000 Guineas and the Queen Elizabeth II Stakes in 1996. He went on to become a successful stallion, siring The Derby winner Sir Percy and the European champion sprinter Reverence. Her dam, Walimu, won three minor races for Ahmed Al Maktoum and was a granddaughter of the racemare Roussalka who won the Coronation Stakes and two editions of the Nassau Stakes in the mid-1970s. As a descendant of the broodmare Mumtaz Begum, she is a member of the same branch of Thoroughbred family 9-c which produced Shergar, Risen Star and Oh So Sharp.

Ameerat was trained at Newmarket, Suffolk by Michael Jarvis and was ridden in all but one of her races by Philip Robinson.

== Racing career ==
Ameerat began her racing career in a seven furlong maiden race at Goodwood in August 2000. According to The Daily Telegraph she had already acquired a "glowing reputation" on the basis of her performances in training. She started 3/1 favourite and won comfortably by two lengths from Sayedah, leading the Racing Post to describe her as "promising". A month later, Ameerat was moved up in class for the Group Three May Hill Stakes at Doncaster Racecourse. Ridden by Frankie Dettori, Ameerat had a troubled race, struggling to obtain a clear run in the straight and then being hampered in the last strides as she finished second by a length to the favourite Karasta. In October, Ameerat started 4/1 second favourite for the Group Two Rockfel Stakes at Newmarket, but finished sixth of the sixteen runners behind Sayedah and Imagine.

Ameerat did not contest any of the early trial races in the spring of 2001, but reportedly pleased Jarvis with her performances in training. On 6 May, Ameerat made her three-year-old debut in the 1000 Guineas over Newmarket's Rowley Mile course. She started at odds of 11/1 in a field of fifteen runners, with Karasta being made the 9/2 favourite. Robinson positioned the filly just behind the front-running Godolphin filly Muwakleh before moving up to challenge for the lead a furlong from the finish. In the closing stages, Ameerat overtook Muwakleh and won by a neck, with Toroca one and three quarter lengths further back in third. Ameerat's victory gave Jarvis his first British classic winner in a thirty-three year training career. He described the moment as "a great thrill", while Robinson described the winner as a "remarkable filly".

Ameerat's form deteriorated after her classic win. Her next start came in the Coronation Stakes at Royal Ascot where she made little impression, finishing fifth behind the French-trained filly Banks Hill. Matched against colts and older horses in the Sussex Stakes at Goodwood in July, Ameerat started a 16/1 outsider and finished eighth of the ten runners behind Noverre. The filly was dropped in class for her final start in the Group Two Sun Chariot Stakes at Newmarket in October. Ameerat was never in serious contention and finished seventh behind Independence.

Ameerat remained in training in 2002, and was entered in the Eclipse Stakes, but did not race again.

== Stud record ==
Ameerat became a broodmare for the Maktoum family's Darley Stud. She has produced several minor winners, but nothing of top class.

DOB Foal Sire Breeder Runs Wins Earnings Wins Course Race Type

2004 25-Feb-04 Own Boss (USA) Seeking The Gold (USA) Darley 5 1 £4,616 27-Aug-07 Warwick Maiden

2005 Barren

2006 Barren

2007 21-Jan-07 b c Sowaylm (GB) Tobougg (IRE) Darley 18 1 £11,243 1-Nov-09 Lingfield Median Auction Maiden

2008 11-Mar-08 b c Kawssaj (GB) Dubawi (IRE) Darley 9 1 £4,476 8-Aug-11 Lingfield Maiden

2009 19-Mar-09 b f Oojooba (GB) Monsun (GER) Darley 11 1 £20,951 24-Sep-11 Haydock Maiden Fillies, LR placed in 2013

2010 20-Mar-10 b f Saadatt (GB) New Approach (IRE) Darley Unraced

2011 3-May-11 b c High Bridge (GB) Monsun (GER) Darley Won 2 National Hunt Flat Races and placed twice in similar races from 4 starts in England 2015; placed 2nd from 1 start on the flat in 2016; won 3 novice hurdles from 3 starts to date over hurdles 2016–17

2012 26-Apr-12 b f (Ire) New Approach (IRE)

== Pedigree ==
Pedigree of Ameerat (GB), bay mare, 1998
Sire Mark of Esteem (IRE) 1993	Darshaan; 1981	Shirley Heights	Mill Reef
Sire Mark of Esteem (IRE) 1993	Darshaan; 1981	Shirley Heights	Hardiemma
Sire Mark of Esteem (IRE) 1993	Darshaan; 1981	Delsy	Abdos
Sire Mark of Esteem (IRE) 1993	Darshaan; 1981	Delsy	Kelty
Sire Mark of Esteem (IRE) 1993	Homage; 1989	Ajdal	Northern Dancer
Sire Mark of Esteem (IRE) 1993	Homage; 1989	Ajdal	Native Partner
Sire Mark of Esteem (IRE) 1993	Homage; 1989	Home Love	Vaguely Noble
Sire Mark of Esteem (IRE) 1993	Homage; 1989	Home Love	Homespun
Dam Walimu (IRE) 1989	Top Ville; 1976	High Top	Derring-Do
Dam Walimu (IRE) 1989	Top Ville; 1976	High Top	Camenae
Dam Walimu (IRE) 1989	Top Ville; 1976	Sega Ville	Charlottesville
Dam Walimu (IRE) 1989	Top Ville; 1976	Sega Ville	La Sega
Dam Walimu (IRE) 1989	Summer Impressions; 1980	Lyphard	Northern Dancer
Dam Walimu (IRE) 1989	Summer Impressions; 1980	Lyphard	Goofed
Dam Walimu (IRE) 1989	Summer Impressions; 1980	Roussalka	Habitat
Dam Walimu (IRE) 1989	Summer Impressions; 1980	Roussalka	Oh So Fair (Family: 9-c)

- Ameerat is inbred 4x4 to Northern Dancer, meaning that this stallion appears twice in the fourth generation of her pedigree.
