= Saoirse Abu =

American-bred Thoroughbred racehorse

- Sire: Mr Greeley
- Grandsire: Gone West
- Dam: Out Too Late
- Damsire: Future Storm
- Sex: Mare
- Foaled: 20 March 2005
- Country: United States
- Colour: Chestnut
- Breeder: White Cloud Bloodstock, Omar Trevino and N & P Partnership
- Owner: Ennistown Stud
- Trainer: Jim Bolger
- Record: 11:3-0-5
- Earnings: £338,204

Major wins
- Phoenix Stakes (2007); Moyglare Stud Stakes (2007)

Saoirse Abu (foaled 20 March 2005) was an American-bred Irish-trained thoroughbred racehorse and broodmare. She was one of the leading European two-year-old fillies of her generation, winning three of her eight races including two of Ireland's most important races for juveniles: the Phoenix Stakes and the Moyglare Stud Stakes. She raced three times as a three-year-old in 2008, producing her best effort when a close third in the 1000 Guineas. She was sold for over £2 million at the end of her racing career and became a broodmare in the ownership of Sheikh Mohammed.

== Background ==
Saoirse Abu (an Irish phrase which can be translated as Freedom Forever) is a chestnut mare with a white star bred in Kentucky by White Cloud Bloodstock, Omar Trevino and N & P Partnership. Her sire, Mr Greeley was an American sprinter who won at Grade III level and finished second in the 1995 Breeders' Cup Sprint. Although he was based in the United States throughout his stud career, he had great success in Europe, siring Finsceal Beo and the Sussex Stakes winner Reel Buddy. Saoirse Abu's dam, Out Too Late was an unraced daughter of Morning Has Broken, a mare whose other descendants included Balanchine and the Prix de Diane winner West Wind.

In September 2006, the filly was consigned to the Keeneland yearling sales where she was bought for $260,000 by BBA Ireland. She entered into the ownership of the County Meath-based Ennistown Stud and was sent to Ireland where she was trained by Jim Bolger at Coolcullen, County Carlow. Saoirse Abu was ridden in all but one of her races by Kevin Manning.

== Racing career ==
=== 2007: two-year-old season ===
Saoirse Abu began her racing career in a six furlong maiden race at Naas Racecourse on 16 May when she finished third of the twenty runners, beaten two lengths and a head by Raja and Pretty Ballerina. Eleven days later, in a similar event at the Curragh, the filly recorded her first success as she took the lead a furlong and a half from the finish and won "easily" by four lengths from the colt Norman Invader.

Saoirse Abu was moved up in class for her next race, the Group Three Swordlestown Stud Sprint Stakes at Naas on 4 June in which she finished second by a length to the Aidan O'Brien-trained You'resothrilling, a filly who went on to win the Cherry Hinton Stakes in England. In the Listed Saoire Stakes at the Curragh at the end of the month, the filly started 9/10 favourite but after racing in second place for the first half of the race, made no further impression and finished of the seven runners behind Listen. In July, she was moved up in distance for the Listed Silver Flash Stakes over seven furlongs at Leopardstown Racecourse. Ridden by D J Dolan (Manning opted to ride a more fancied stable companion), she finished third of the nine fillies behind Triskel and Mad About You. On 12 August Saoirse Abu was again moved up in class for the Group One Phoenix Stakes in which she was matched against colts over six furlongs on heavy ground. Equipped with blinkers for the first time, she was made the 25/1 outsider of the six runner field with Aidan O'Brien's unbeaten Coventry Stakes winner Henrythenavigator starting odds on favourite ahead of the Queen Mary Stakes winner Elletelle. Manning positioned the filly just behind the leaders before taking the lead in the final quarter mile. She was overtaken by Henrythenavigator a furlong from the finish, but rallied strongly to regain the lead in the closing stages and defeat the colt by a length with Elletelle one and three quarter lengths back in third place.

Three weeks later, over seven furlongs at the Curragh, Saoirse Abu contested the Moyglare Stud Stakes, Ireland's only Group One race restricted to two-year-old fillies. Despite her previous Group One success, she was only third in the betting behind Listen and the English-trained Albabilia, the winner of the Sweet Solera Stakes. Saoirse Abu raced in third place before moving up to challenge Albabilia in the final quarter mile. She took the lead approaching the final furlong and won "comfortably" by one and a half lengths from Listen, Mad About You and Albabilia. After the race, Jim Bolger said "I have been very happy with her. She is a hardy horse and is very professional. We have no definite plans as yet but I wouldn't be certain she would be seen out again on the track this season. The 1,000 Guineas is the real aim for her next year, and even at this stage, she wants a mile really". On 29 September, the filly was sent to England and moved up in distance for the Group One Meon Valley Stud Fillies' Mile at Ascot Racecourse in which she was again matched against Listen. Saoirse Abu raced in second place before briefly taking the lead two furlongs out, but was unable to quicken in the closing stages and finished third behind Listen and the French-trained favourite Proviso.

=== 2008: three-year-old season ===
Saoirse Abu began her second season in the Leopardstown 1,000 Guineas Trial Stakes over seven furlongs on 7 April. She started at odds of 2/1 and kept on well in the closing stages without ever looking likely to win and finished third behind Carribbean Sunset and Halfway to Heaven. Four weeks later, Saoirse Abu started a 20/1 outsider in a field of fifteen for the classic 1000 Guineas over the Rowley Mile at Newmarket Racecourse. Manning restrained the filly behind the leaders and briefly struggled to obtain a clear run approaching the final furlong. She stayed on well in the closing stages to finish third behind Natagora and Spacious, a length behind the winner. On 25 May, the filly started the 7/2 second favourite for the Irish 1,000 Guineas at the Curragh. She was held up by Manning at the back of the thirteen runner field but after moving into contention two furlongs from the finish, was unable to make further progress and finished fifth, behind Halfway to Heaven, Tuscan Evening, Mad About You and Carribbean Sunset.

Saoirse Abu did not race again. On 1 December, she was offered for sale at the Tattersalls Breeding Stock Sale at Newmarket and bought for 1,950,000 guineas by John Ferguson, acting on behalf of Sheikh Mohammed. A representative of the Ennistown Stud commented "Maybe in 10 years' time I'll have a couple of Saoirse Abus out in the field but for me she was too valuable to hold on to".

== Breeding career ==
Saoirse Abu was retired from racing to become a broodmare for Sheikh Mohammed's Dalham Hall stud. To date, she has produced two foals:

- Ennistown (bay gelding, foaled in 2010, sired by Authorized), won four races
- Bounding (bay filly, 2011, by Exceed and Excel)

== Pedigree ==
Pedigree of Saoirse Abu (USA), chestnut mare, 2005
Sire Mr Greeley (USA) 1992	Gone West; 1984	Mr. Prospector	Raise a Native
Sire Mr Greeley (USA) 1992	Gone West; 1984	Mr. Prospector	Gold Digger
Sire Mr Greeley (USA) 1992	Gone West; 1984	Secrettame	Secretariat
Sire Mr Greeley (USA) 1992	Gone West; 1984	Secrettame	Tamerett
Sire Mr Greeley (USA) 1992	Long Legend (USA); 1978	Reviewer	Bold Ruler
Sire Mr Greeley (USA) 1992	Long Legend (USA); 1978	Reviewer	Broadway
Sire Mr Greeley (USA) 1992	Long Legend (USA); 1978	Lianga	Dancer's Image
Sire Mr Greeley (USA) 1992	Long Legend (USA); 1978	Lianga	Leven Ones
Dam Out Too Late (USA) 1997	Future Storm (USA); 1990	Storm Cat	Storm Bird
Dam Out Too Late (USA) 1997	Future Storm (USA); 1990	Storm Cat	Terlingua
Dam Out Too Late (USA) 1997	Future Storm (USA); 1990	Sea Sands	Sea Bird
Dam Out Too Late (USA) 1997	Future Storm (USA); 1990	Sea Sands	Slapton Sands
Dam Out Too Late (USA) 1997	Morning Has Broken (USA); 1974	Prince John	Princequillo
Dam Out Too Late (USA) 1997	Morning Has Broken (USA); 1974	Prince John	Not Afraid
Dam Out Too Late (USA) 1997	Morning Has Broken (USA); 1974	A Wind Is Rising	Francis S
Dam Out Too Late (USA) 1997	Morning Has Broken (USA); 1974	A Wind Is Rising	Queen Nasra (Family: 4-k)
