= Surrey Stakes =

Flat horse race in Britain

Surrey Stakes
2026
Ellusive Butterfly	Greek Mythology	Ardisia

Previous years
2025
Formal	Saqqara Sands	Diego Ventura
2024
Evade	Native American	Balmacara
2023
Olivia Maralda	Holguin	Streets Of Gold
2022
Ever Given	Oscula	Bass Player
2021
Mehmento	Legal Attack	Meu Amor

2020-2011
2020
Safe Voyage	Vale Of Kent	Shine So Bright
2019
Space Blues	Urban Icon	Marie's Diamond
2018
Lake Volta	Aurum	Rufus King
2017
Solomon's Bay	Seven Heavens	True Valour
2016
Smuggler's Moon	Make Fast	Raucous
2015
Code Red	Mister Universe	Secret Brief
2014
That Is The Spirit	Parbold	Penny Drops
2013
Well Acquainted	Emell	Hasopop
2012
Producer	Justineo	Lady Gorgeous
2011
Hooray	Lord Of The Stars	Chilworth Lad

2010-2001
2010
Shakespearean	Yaa Wayl	Mon Cadeaux
2009
Ocean's Minstrel	Ermine And Velvet	Nasri
2008
Iguazu Falls	Fathsta	Croi Mo Ri
2007
Howya Now Kid	Solid Rock	Whazzis
2006
Racer Forever	Bouboulina	Kingsgate Prince
2005
Galeota	Goodricke	Excusez Moi
2004
Madid	Pastoral Pursuits	Peak To Creek
2003
Rimrod	Naahy	Duty Paid
2002
Red Liason	Terfel	Oases
2001
Jentzen	Amicable	Pan Jammer

2000-1995
2000
Nicobar	Smart Ridge	Magic of Love
1999
Cybinka	Caballero	Arctic Char
1998
Volontiers	Merlin's Ring	Parisian Lady
1997
Hidden Meadow	Wasp Ranger	Moonshine Girl
1996
Ramooz	Warning Time	Almushtarak
1995
Silca Blanka	Signs	Green Perfume

The Surrey Stakes (branded as the Cygames Surrey Stakes for sponsorship reasons) is a Listed flat horse race in Great Britain open to horses aged three years only. It is run at Epsom over a distance of 7 furlongs and 3 yards (1,411 metres), and it is scheduled to take place each year in late May or early June.

The race was first run in 1995, as the Vodacom Conditions Stakes. It was given its current name and awarded Listed status in 1998.

== Records ==
Leading jockey (2 wins):

- Pat Eddery – Volontiers (1998), Jentzen (2001)
- Kieren Fallon – Nicobar (2000), Rimrod (2003)
- Frankie Dettori – Iguazu Falls (2008), Shakespearean (2010)
- Richard Hughes – Cybinka (1999), Producer (2012)
- Ryan Moore – Galeota (2005), Well Acquainted (2013)
- Jimmy Fortune – Racer Forever (2006), Smuggler's Moon (2016)
- Silvestre de Sousa – Solomon's Bay (2017), Lake Volta (2018)
- Oisin Murphy - Evade (2024), Formal (2025)

Leading trainer (4 wins):

- Richard Hannon Sr. – Cybinka (1999), Jentzen (2001), Galeota (2005), Producer (2012)

== Winners ==
Year	Winner	Jockey	Trainer	Time
1995	Silca Blanka	Kevin Darley	Mick Channon	1:22.42
1996	Ramooz	Willie Ryan	Ben Hanbury	1:24.43
1997	Hidden Meadow	Michael Hills	Ian Balding	1:21.69
1998	Volontiers	Pat Eddery	Peter Harris	1:21.29
1999	Cybinka	Richard Hughes	Richard Hannon Sr.	1:23.57
2000	Nicobar	Kieren Fallon	Ian Balding	1:25.92
2001	Jentzen	Pat Eddery	Richard Hannon Sr.	1:23.54
2002	Red Liason	Richard Quinn	John Dunlop	1:26.61
2003	Rimrod	Kieren Fallon	Andrew Balding	1:22.59
2004	Madid	Richard Hills	John Gosden	1:28.73
2005	Galeota	Ryan Moore	Richard Hannon Sr.	1:23.50
2006	Racer Forever	Jimmy Fortune	John Gosden	1:23.59
2007	Howya Now Kid	Johnny Murtagh	Ger Lyons	1:25.55
2008	Iguazu Falls	Frankie Dettori	Saeed bin Suroor	1:24.11
2009	Ocean's Minstrel	John O'Dwyer	John Ryan	1:22.99
2010	Shakespearean	Frankie Dettori	Saeed bin Suroor	1:21.65
2011	Hooray	Seb Sanders	Sir Mark Prescott	1:21.56
2012	Producer	Richard Hughes	Richard Hannon Sr.	1:21.48
2013	Well Acquainted	Ryan Moore	Clive Cox	1:25.33
2014	That Is The Spirit	Danny Tudhope	David O'Meara	1:21.58
2015	Code Red	Martin Dwyer	William Muir	1:22.57
2016	Smuggler's Moon	Jimmy Fortune	Brian Meehan	1:27.01
2017	Solomon's Bay	Silvestre de Sousa	Roger Varian	1:21.97
2018	Lake Volta	Silvestre de Sousa	Mark Johnston	1:24.34
2019	Space Blues	James Doyle	Charlie Appleby	1:22.74
2020 (Note: The 2020 race was run in July and open to older horses due to the COVID-19 pandemic in the United Kingdom)	Safe Voyage	Jason Hart	John Quinn	1:19.88
2021	Mehmento	Hollie Doyle	Archie Watson	1:27.48
2022	Ever Given	Daniel Tudhope	Hugo Palmer	1:23.08
2023	Olivia Maralda	Kevin Stott	Roger Varian	1:21.03
2024	Evade	Oisin Murphy	Archie Watson	1:25.48
2025	Formal	Oisin Murphy	Andrew Balding	1:24.02
2026	Ellusive Butterfly	Clifford Lee	Karl Burke	1:24.51

== See also ==
- Horse racing in Great Britain
- List of British flat horse races
