= Maqaasid =

British-bred Thoroughbred racehorse

- Sire: Green Desert
- Grandsire: Danzig
- Dam: Eshaadeh
- Damsire: Storm Cat
- Sex: mare
- Foaled: 2008
- Country: United Kingdom
- Colour: Bay
- Breeder: Shadwell Stud
- Owner: Hamdan Al Maktoum
- Trainer: John Gosden
- Jockey: Richard Hills
- Record: 10 2-0-4
- Earnings: £135,558

Major wins
- Queen Mary Stakes (2010)

Maqaasid (born 2008) was a Thoroughbred racehorse. Ridden by Richard Hills, she won the prestigious Queen Mary Stakes at Royal Ascot in 2010, in a new track record of 59.17 seconds. In her racing career, she had ten starts- winning two of them.
