= 1000 Guineas Stakes =

Flat horse race in Britain

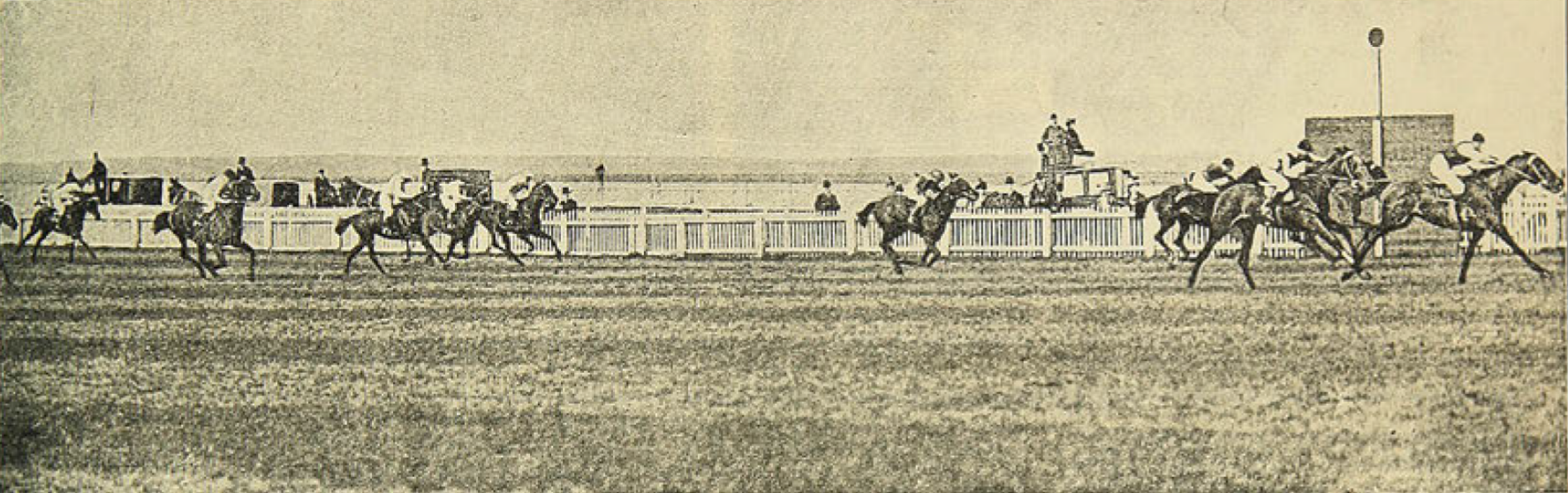
- Sceptre winning the 1902 edition
- Class: Group 1
- Location: Rowley Mile; Newmarket, Suffolk, England
- Inaugurated: 1814
- Race type: Flat / Thoroughbred
- Sponsor: QIPCO
- Website: Newmarket

Race information
- Distance: 1 mile (1,609 metres)
- Surface: Turf
- Track: Straight
- Qualification: Three-year-old fillies
- Weight: 9 st 0 lb
- Purse: £500,000 (2022); 1st: £283,550

1000 Guineas Stakes
2026
True Love	Evolutionist	Venetian Lace

Previous years
2025
Desert Flower	Flight	Simmering
2024
Elmalka	Porta Fortuna	Ramatuelle
2023
Mawj	Tahiyra	Matilda Picotte
2022
Cachet	Prosperous Voyage	Tuesday
2021
Mother Earth	Saffron Beach	Fev Rover

2020-2011
2020
Love	Cloak Of Spirits	Quadrilateral
2019
Hermosa	Lady Kaya	Qabala
2018
Billesdon Brook	Laurens	Happily
2017
Winter	Rhododendron	Daban
2016
Minding	Ballydoyle	Alice Springs
2015
Legatissimo	Lucida	Tiggy Wiggy
2014
Miss France	Lightning Thunder	Ihtimal
2013
Sky Lantern	Just The Judge	Moth
2012
Homecoming Queen	Starscope	Maybe
2011
Blue Bunting	Together	Maqaasid

2010–2001
2010
Special Duty	Jacqueline Quest	Gile Na Greine
2009
Ghanaati	Cuis Ghaire	Super Sleuth
2008
Natagora	Spacious	Saoirse Abu
2007
Finsceal Beo	Arch Swing	Simply Perfect
2006
Speciosa	Confidential Lady	Nasheej
2005
Virginia Waters	Maids Causeway	Vista Bella
2004
Attraction	Sundrop	Hathrah
2003
Russian Rhythm	Six Perfections	Intercontinental
2002
Kazzia	Snowfire	Alasha
2001
Ameerat	Muwakleh	Toroca

2000–1991
2000
Lahan	Princess Ellen	Petrushka
1999
Wince	Wannabe Grand	Valentine Waltz
1998
Cape Verdi	Shahtoush	Exclusive
1997
Sleepytime	Oh Nellie	Dazzle
1996
Bosra Sham	Matiya	Bint Shadayid
1995
Harayir	Aqaarid	Moonshell
1994
Las Meninas	Balanchine	Coup de Genie
1993
Sayyedati	Niche	Ajfan
1992
Hatoof	Marling	Kenbu
1991
Shadayid	Kooyonga	Crystal Gazing

1990–1981
1990
Salsabil	Heart Of Joy	Negligent
1989
Musical Bliss	Kerrera	Aldbourne
1988
Ravinella	Dabaweyaa	Diminuendo
1987
Miesque	Milligram	Interval
1986
Midway Lady	Maysoon	Sonic Lady
1985
Oh So Sharp	Al Bahathri	Bella Colora
1984
Pebbles	Meis El-Reem	Desirable
1983
Ma Biche	Favoridge	Royal Heroine
1982
On the House	Time Charter	Dione
1981
Fairy Footsteps	Tolmi	Go Leasing

1980–1970
1980
Quick As Lightning	Our Home	Mrs Penny
1979
One In A Million	Abbeydale	Yanuka
1978
Enstone Spark	Fair Salinia	Seraphima
1977
Mrs McArdy	Freeze the Secret	Sanedtki
1976
Flying Water	Konafa	Kesar Queen
1975
Nocturnal Spree	Girl Friend	Joking Apart
1974
Highclere	Polygamy	Mrs Tiggywinkle
1973
Mysterious	Jacinth	Shellshock
1972
Waterloo	Marisela	Rose Dubarry
1971
Altesse Royale	Super Honey	Catherine Wheel
1970
Humble Duty	Gleam	Black Satin

The 1000 Guineas Stakes is a Group 1 flat horse race in Great Britain open to three-year-old fillies. It is run on the Rowley Mile at Newmarket over a distance of 1 mile (1,609 metres), and takes place each year in late April or early May on the Sunday following the 2000 Guineas Stakes.

It is the second of Britain's five Classic races, and the first of two restricted to fillies. It can also serve as the opening leg of the Fillies Triple Crown, followed by the Oaks and the St Leger, but the feat of winning all three is rarely attempted.

== History ==
The 1000 Guineas was first run on 28 April 1814, five years after the inaugural running of the equivalent race for both colts and fillies, the 2000 Guineas. The two races were established by the Jockey Club under the direction of Sir Charles Bunbury, who had earlier co-founded the Derby. They were named according to their original prize funds (a guinea amounted to 21 shillings, or £1.05).

By the mid-1860s, the 1000 Guineas had become one of Britain's most prestigious races for three-year-olds. The five leading events for this age group, characterised by increasing distances as the season progressed, were now referred to as "Classics". The concept was later adopted in many other countries.

European variations of the 1000 Guineas include the German 1,000 Guineas, the Irish 1,000 Guineas, the Poule d'Essai des Pouliches and the Premio Regina Elena. Other countries to have adopted the format include Australia, Japan and New Zealand.

The 1000 Guineas is served by trial races such as the Nell Gwyn Stakes and the Fred Darling Stakes, but for some horses it is the first race of the season. The 1000 Guineas itself can act as a trial for the Oaks, and the last horse to win both was Love in 2020.

== Records ==
Leading jockey (7 wins):

- George Fordham – Mayonaise (1859), Nemesis (1861), Siberia (1865), Formosa (1868), Scottish Queen (1869), Thebais (1881), Hauteur (1883)

Leading trainer (9 wins):

- Robert Robson – Corinne (1818), Catgut (1819), Rowena (1820), Zeal (1821), Whizgig (1822), Zinc (1823), Tontine (1825), Problem (1826), Arab (1827)

Leading owner (8 wins):

- 4th Duke of Grafton – Catgut (1819), Rowena (1820), Zeal (1821), Whizgig (1822), Zinc (1823), Tontine (1825), Problem (1826), Arab (1827)
- Fastest winning time – Ghanaati (2009), 1m 34.22s
- Widest winning margin – Mayonaise (1859), 20 lengths
- Longest odds winner – Billesdon Brook (2018), 66/1
- Shortest odds winner – Crucifix (1840), 1/10
- Most runners – 29, in 1926
- Fewest runners – 1 (a walkover), in 1825

== Winners ==
Year	Winner	Jockey	Trainer	Owner	Time
1814	Charlotte	Bill Clift	Tom Perren	Christopher Wilson
1815	Filly by Selim	Bill Clift	Richard Prince	3rd Baron Foley
1816	Rhoda	Sam Barnarde	Dixon Boyce	5th Duke of Rutland
1817	Neva	Bill Arnull	Dixon Boyce	George Watson
1818	Corinne	Frank Buckle	Robert Robson	John Udney
1819	Catgut		Robert Robson	4th Duke of Grafton
1820	Rowena	Frank Buckle	Robert Robson	4th Duke of Grafton
1821	Zeal	Frank Buckle	Robert Robson	4th Duke of Grafton
1822	Whizgig	Frank Buckle	Robert Robson	4th Duke of Grafton
1823	Zinc	Frank Buckle	Robert Robson	4th Duke of Grafton
1824	Cobweb	Jem Robinson	James Edwards	5th Earl of Jersey
1825	Tontine		Robert Robson	4th Duke of Grafton
1826	Problem	John Barham Day	Robert Robson	4th Duke of Grafton
1827	Arab	Frank Buckle	Robert Robson	4th Duke of Grafton
1828	Zoe	Jem Robinson	Bobby Pettit	Arthur Molony
1829	Young Mouse	Bill Arnull	Dixon Boyce	Lord George Cavendish
1830	Charlotte West	Jem Robinson	James Edwards	5th Earl of Jersey
1831	Galantine	Patrick Conolly	H. Scott	Sir Mark Wood
1832	Galata	Bill Arnull	Charles Marson	2nd Marquess of Exeter
1833	Tarantella	E. Wright	John Robinson	T. H. Cookes
1834	May-day	John Barham Day	John Doe	9th Baron Berners
1835	Preserve	Nat Flatman	R. Prince Jr.	Charles Greville
1836	Destiny	John Barham Day	John Barham Day	Thomas Houldsworth
1837	Chapeau d'Espagne	John Barham Day	John Barham Day	Lord George Bentinck
1838	Barcarolle	Edward Edwards	W. Edwards	4th Earl of Albemarle
1839	Cara	George Edwards	Charles Marson	Richard Watt
1840	Crucifix	John Barham Day	John Barham Day	Lord George Bentinck
1841	Potentia	Jem Robinson	George Payne	Stanlake Batson
1842	Firebrand	Sam Rogers	John Kent Jr.	Lord George Bentinck
1843	Extempore	Sam Chifney Jr.	Bobby Pettit	Thomas Thornhill
1844	Sorella	Jem Robinson	William Butler Jr.	George Osbaldeston
1845	Pic-Nic	William Abdale	John Kent Jr.	5th Duke of Richmond
1846	Mendicant	Sam Day	John Day	John Gully
1847	Clementina	Nat Flatman	Montgomery Dilly	George Payne
1848	Canezou	Frank Butler	John Scott	Lord Stanley
1849	The Flea	Alfred Day	John Day	Frank Clarke
1850	Lady Orford	Frank Butler	W. Beresford	3rd Earl of Orford
1851	Aphrodite	Job Marson	Alec Taylor Sr.	Sir Joseph Hawley
1852	Kate	Alfred Day	J. Woolcott	J. Sargent
1853	Mentmore Lass	Jack Charlton	W. King	Mayer A. de Rothschild
1854	Virago	John Wells	John Barham Day	Henry Padwick
1855	Habena	Sam Rogers	William Butler Jr.	7th Duke of Bedford
1856	Manganese	John Osborne Jr.	John Osborne	John King
1857	Imperieuse	Nat Flatman	John Scott	John Scott	1:53.00
1858	Governess	Tom Ashmall	Tom Eskrett	William Gratwicke
1859	Mayonaise	George Fordham	Tom Taylor	William Stuart Stirling-Crawfurd
1860	Sagitta	Tom Aldcroft	John Scott	14th Earl of Derby
1861	Nemesis	George Fordham	William Harlock	G. Fleming	1:50.00
1862	Hurricane	Tom Ashmall	John Scott	6th Viscount Falmouth
1863	Lady Augusta	Arthur Edwards	Joseph Dawson	7th Earl of Stamford
1864	Tomato	John Wells	Joseph Hayhoe	Mayer A. de Rothschild	1:53.00
1865	Siberia	George Fordham	John Day	8th Duke of Beaufort
1866	Repulse	Tom Cannon Sr.	John Day	4th Marquess of Hastings
1867	Achievement	Harry Custance	James Dover	Mark Pearson
1868	Formosa	George Fordham	Henry Woolcott	William Graham
1869	Scottish Queen	George Fordham	John Day	8th Duke of Beaufort
1870	Hester	Jemmy Grimshaw	Joseph Dawson	Joseph Dawson
1871	Hannah	Charlie Maidment	Joseph Hayhoe	Mayer A. de Rothschild
1872	Reine	Henry Parry	Tom Jennings Sr.	Claude Joachim Lefèvre
1873	Cecilia	Jack Morris	Mathew Dawson	6th Viscount Falmouth
1874	Apology	John Osborne Jr.	William Osborne	John King
1875	Spinaway	Fred Archer	Mathew Dawson	6th Viscount Falmouth
1876	Camelia	Tom Glover	T. Cunnington	Frédéric de Lagrange
1877	Belphoebe	Harry Jeffery	George Bloss	Marquess of Hartington
1878	Pilgrimage	Tom Cannon Sr.	Joe Cannon	4th Earl of Lonsdale	2:00.00
1879	Wheel of Fortune	Fred Archer	Mathew Dawson	6th Viscount Falmouth	1:54.00
1880	Elizabeth	Charles Wood	Joseph Dawson	T. E. Walker	1:56.00
1881	Thebais	George Fordham	Alec Taylor Sr.	William Stirling Crawfurd	1:50.00
1882	St Marguerite	Charles Wood	R. Sherrard	William Stirling Crawfurd	1:55.40
1883	Hauteur	George Fordham	Tom Jennings Jr.	Claude Joachim Lefèvre	1:52.80
1884	Busybody	Tom Cannon Sr.	Tom Cannon Sr.	George Baird	1:47.00
1885	Farewell	George Barrett	John Porter	1st Duke of Westminster	1:47.80
1886	Miss Jummy	John Watts	Richard Marsh	12th Duke of Hamilton	1:52.40
1887	Reve d'Or	Charles Wood	Alec Taylor Sr.	8th Duke of Beaufort	1:47.60
1888	Briar-root	Billy Warne	James Ryan	Douglas Baird	1:44.00
1889	Minthe	Jimmy Woodburn	Mathew Dawson	Robert Vyner	1:52.00
1890	Semolina	John Watts	George Dawson	6th Duke of Portland	1:48.80
1891	Mimi	Fred Rickaby	Mathew Dawson	Noel Fenwick	1:44.20
1892	La Fleche	George Barrett	John Porter	Baron Maurice de Hirsch	1:52.40
1893	Siffleuse	Tommy Loates	Percy Peck	Sir John Blundell Maple	1:53.00
1894	Amiable	Walter Bradford	George Dawson	6th Duke of Portland	1:46.00
1895	Galeottia	Fred Pratt	James Ryan	Alfred Cox	1:47.20
1896	Thais	John Watts	Richard Marsh	Prince of Wales	1:46.20
1897	Chelandry	John Watts	William Walters Jr.	5th Earl of Rosebery	1:42.60
1898	Nun Nicer	Sam Loates	Willie Waugh	Sir John Blundell Maple	1:48.60
1899	Sibola	Tod Sloan	John Huggins	Lord William Beresford	1:44.20
1900	Winifreda	Sam Loates	Tom Jennings Jr.	Leonard Brassey	1:46.00
1901	Aida	Danny Maher	George Blackwell	Sir James Miller	1:44.6
1902	Sceptre	Herbert Randall	Bob Sievier	Bob Sievier	1:40.2
1903	Quintessence	Herbert Randall	Jim Chandler	7th Viscount Falmouth	1:48.0
1904	Pretty Polly	Willie Lane	Peter Gilpin	Eustace Loder	1:40.00
1905	Cherry Lass	George McCall	Jack Robinson	William Hall Walker	1:43.40
1906	Flair	Bernard Dillon	Peter Gilpin	Sir Daniel Cooper	1:40.6
1907	Witch Elm	Barry Lynham	Jack Robinson	William Hall Walker	1:42.6
1908	Rhodora	Lucien Lyne	James Allen	Richard Croker	1:43.8
1909	Electra	Bernard Dillon	Peter Gilpin	Ludwig Neumann	1:40.4
1910	Winkipop	Barry Lynham	Willie Waugh	Waldorf Astor	1:41.00
1911	Atmah	Freddie Fox	Fred Pratt	James A. de Rothschild	1:38.40
1912	Tagalie	Les Hewitt	Dawson Waugh	Walter Raphael	1:39.60
1913	Jest	Fred Rickaby Jr.	Charles Morton	Jack Barnato Joel	1:40.8
1914	Princess Dorrie	Bill Huxley	Charles Morton	Jack Barnato Joel	1:42.00
1915	Vaucluse	Fred Rickaby Jr.	Frank Hartigan	5th Earl of Rosebery	1:40.8
1916	Canyon	Fred Rickaby Jr.	George Lambton	17th Earl of Derby	1:40.00
1917	Diadem	Fred Rickaby Jr.	George Lambton	1st Viscount d'Abernon	1:43.00
1918	Ferry	Brownie Carslake	George Lambton	17th Earl of Derby	1:46.40
1919	Roseway	Albert Whalley	Frank Hartigan	Sir Edward Hulton	1:47.60
1920	Cinna	Billy Griggs	Tom Waugh Sr.	Sir Robert Jardine	1:40.40
1921	Bettina	George Bellhouse	Percy Linton	Walter Raphael	1:44.60
1922	Silver Urn	Brownie Carslake	Atty Persse	Barney Parr	1:40.00
1923	Tranquil	Ted Gardner	George Lambton	17th Earl of Derby	1:39.00
1924	Plack	Charlie Elliott	Jack Jarvis	5th Earl of Rosebery	1:39.60
1925	Saucy Sue	Frank Bullock	Alec Taylor Jr.	2nd Viscount Astor	1:42:40
1926	Pillion	Dick Perryman	John Watson	Anthony G. de Rothschild	1:42.00
1927	Cresta Run	Arthur Balding	Peter Gilpin	Giles Loder	1:38.00
1928	Scuttle	Joe Childs	William Rose Jarvis	King George V	1:44.20
1929	Taj Mah	Wally Sibbritt	Juan Torterolo	Simon Guthmann	1:40.40
1930	Fair Isle	Tommy Weston	Frank Butters	17th Earl of Derby	1:42.00
1931	Four Course	Charlie Elliott	Fred Darling	4th Earl of Ellesmere	1:39.80
1932	Kandy	Charlie Elliott	Frank Carter	Evremond de Saint-Alary	1:44.00
1933	Brown Betty	Joe Childs	Cecil Boyd-Rochfort	William Woodward Sr.	1:39.40
1934	Campanula	Harry Wragg	Jack Jarvis	Sir George Bullough	1:39.00
1935	Mesa	Rae Johnstone	Albert Swann	Pierre Wertheimer	1:43.00
1936	Tide-way	Dick Perryman	Colledge Leader	17th Earl of Derby	1:41.80
1937	Exhibitionnist	Steve Donoghue	Joseph Lawson	Sir Victor Sassoon	1:44.00
1938	Rockfel	Sam Wragg	Ossie Bell	Sir Hugo Cunliffe-Owen	1:39.00
1939	Galatea	Bobby Jones	Joseph Lawson	Robert Sterling Clark	1:38.60
1940	Godiva	Doug Marks	William Rose Jarvis	Esmond Harmsworth	1:40.60
1941	Dancing Time	Dick Perryman	Joseph Lawson	1st Baron Glanely	1:40.80
1942	Sun Chariot	Gordon Richards	Fred Darling	King George VI	1:39.60
1943	Herringbone	Harry Wragg	Walter Earl	17th Earl of Derby	1:41.00
1944	Picture Play	Charlie Elliott	John E. Watts	Jim Joel	1:40.20
1945	Sun Stream	Harry Wragg	Walter Earl	17th Earl of Derby	1:45.40
1946	Hypericum	Doug Smith	Cecil Boyd-Rochfort	King George VI	1:41.60
1947	Imprudence	Rae Johnstone	Joseph Lieux	Mrs Pierre Corbière	1:46.00
1948	Queenpot	Gordon Richards	Noel Murless	Sir Percy Loraine	1:41.80
1949	Musidora	Edgar Britt	Charles Elsey	Norman Donaldson	1:40.00
1950	Camaree	Rae Johnstone	Alexandre Lieux	Jean Ternynck	1:37.00
1951	Belle of All	Gordon Richards	Norman Bertie	Henry Tufton	1:44.80
1952	Zabara	Ken Gethin	Vic Smyth	Sir Malcolm McAlpine	1:40.92
1953	Happy Laughter	Manny Mercer	Jack Jarvis	David Wills	1:45.05
1954	Festoon	Scobie Breasley	Noel Cannon	Arthur Dewar	1:38.90
1955	Meld	Harry Carr	Cecil Boyd-Rochfort	Lady Zia Wernher	1:42.16
1956	Honeylight	Edgar Britt	Charles Elsey	Sir Victor Sassoon	1:39.15
1957	Rose Royale	Charlie Smirke	Alec Head	Aga Khan III	1:39.15
1958	Bella Paola	Serge Boullenger	François Mathet	François Dupré	1:38.75
1959	Petite Etoile	Doug Smith	Noel Murless	Prince Aly Khan	1:40.36
1960	Never Too Late	Roger Poincelet	Etienne Pollet	Mrs Howell Jackson	1:39.89
1961	Sweet Solera	Bill Rickaby	Reginald Day	Mrs Magnus Castello	1:38.14
1962	Abermaid	Bill Williamson	Harry Wragg	Roderic More O'Ferrall	1:39.36
1963	Hula Dancer	Roger Poincelet	Etienne Pollet	Gertrude Widener	1:42.34
1964	Pourparler	Garnie Bougoure	Paddy Prendergast	Beatrice, Lady Granard	1:38.82
1965	Night Off	Bill Williamson	Walter Wharton	Lionel Holliday	1:45.43
1966	Glad Rags	Paul Cook	Vincent O'Brien	Alice du Pont Mills	1:40.30
1967	Fleet	George Moore	Noel Murless	Bob Boucher	1:44.76
1968	Caergwrle	Sandy Barclay	Noel Murless	Gwen Murless	1:40.38
1969	Full Dress	Ron Hutchinson	Harry Wragg	Budgie Moller	1:44.53
1970	Humble Duty	Lester Piggott	Peter Walwyn	Jean, Lady Ashcombe	1:42.13
1971	Altesse Royale	Yves Saint-Martin	Noel Murless	Roger Hue-Williams	1:40.90
1972	Waterloo	Edward Hide	Bill Watts	Susan Stanley	1:39.49
1973	Mysterious	Geoff Lewis	Noel Murless	George Pope Jr.	1:42.12
1974	Highclere	Joe Mercer	Dick Hern	Queen Elizabeth II	1:40.32
1975	Nocturnal Spree	Johnny Roe	Stuart Murless	Anne-Hart O'Kelly	1:41.65
1976	Flying Water	Yves Saint-Martin	Angel Penna Sr.	Daniel Wildenstein	1:37.83
1977	Mrs McArdy	Edward Hide	Mick Easterby	Edith Kettlewell	1:40.07
1978	Enstone Spark	Ernie Johnson	Barry Hills	Dick Bonnycastle	1:41.56
1979	One In A Million	Joe Mercer	Henry Cecil	Helena Springfield Ltd	1:43.06
1980	Quick As Lightning	Brian Rouse	John Dunlop	Ogden Mills Phipps	1:41.89
1981	Fairy Footsteps	Lester Piggott	Henry Cecil	Jim Joel	1:40.43
1982	On The House	John Reid	Harry Wragg	Sir Philip Oppenheimer	1:40.45
1983	Ma Biche	Freddy Head	Criquette Head	Maktoum Al Maktoum	1:41.71
1984	Pebbles	Philip Robinson	Clive Brittain	Marcos Lemos	1:38.18
1985	Oh So Sharp	Steve Cauthen	Henry Cecil	Sheikh Mohammed	1:36.85
1986	Midway Lady	Ray Cochrane	Ben Hanbury	Harry Ranier	1:41.54
1987	Miesque	Freddy Head	François Boutin	Stavros Niarchos	1:38.48
1988	Ravinella	Gary W. Moore	Criquette Head	Ecurie Aland	1:40.88
1989	Musical Bliss	Walter Swinburn	Michael Stoute	Sheikh Mohammed	1:42.69
1990	Salsabil	Willie Carson	John Dunlop	Hamdan Al Maktoum	1:38.06
1991	Shadayid	Willie Carson	John Dunlop	Hamdan Al Maktoum	1:38.18
1992	Hatoof	Walter Swinburn	Criquette Head	Maktoum Al Maktoum	1:39.45
1993	Sayyedati	Walter Swinburn	Clive Brittain	Mohamed Obaida	1:37.34
1994	Las Meninas	John Reid	Tommy Stack	Robert Sangster	1:36.71
1995	Harayir	Richard Hills	Dick Hern	Hamdan Al Maktoum	1:36.72
1996	Bosra Sham	Pat Eddery	Henry Cecil	Wafic Saïd	1:37.75
1997	Sleepytime	Kieren Fallon	Henry Cecil	Greenbay Stables Ltd	1:37.66
1998	Cape Verdi	Frankie Dettori	Saeed bin Suroor	Godolphin	1:37.86
1999	Wince	Kieren Fallon	Henry Cecil	Khalid Abdullah	1:37.91
2000	Lahan	Richard Hills	John Gosden	Hamdan Al Maktoum	1:36.38
2001	Ameerat	Philip Robinson	Michael Jarvis	Ahmed Al Maktoum	1:38.36
2002	Kazzia	Frankie Dettori	Saeed bin Suroor	Godolphin	1:37.85
2003	Russian Rhythm	Kieren Fallon	Sir Michael Stoute	Cheveley Park Stud	1:38.43
2004	Attraction	Kevin Darley	Mark Johnston	10th Duke of Roxburghe	1:36.78
2005	Virginia Waters	Kieren Fallon	Aidan O'Brien	Tabor / Magnier	1:36.52
2006	Speciosa	Michael Fenton	Pam Sly	Sly / Davies / Sly	1:40.53
2007	Finsceal Beo	Kevin Manning	Jim Bolger	Michael Ryan	1:34.94
2008	Natagora	Christophe Lemaire	Pascal Bary	Stefan Friborg	1:38.99
2009	Ghanaati	Richard Hills	Barry Hills	Hamdan Al Maktoum	1:34.22
2010	Special Duty (Note: Jacqueline Quest finished first in 2010, but she was relegated to second place following a stewards' inquiry)	Stéphane Pasquier	Criquette Head-Maarek	Khalid Abdullah	1:39.66
2011	Blue Bunting	Frankie Dettori	Mahmood Al Zarooni	Godolphin	1:39.27
2012	Homecoming Queen	Ryan Moore	Aidan O'Brien	Magnier / Tabor / Smith	1:40.45
2013	Sky Lantern	Richard Hughes	Richard Hannon Sr.	Ben Keswick	1:36.38
2014	Miss France	Maxime Guyon	André Fabre	Ballymore Thoroughbred	1:37.40
2015	Legatissimo	Ryan Moore	David Wachman	Magnier / Tabor / Smith	1:34.60
2016	Minding	Ryan Moore	Aidan O'Brien	Magnier / Tabor / Smith	1:36.53
2017	Winter	Wayne Lordan	Aidan O'Brien	Magnier / Tabor / Smith	1:35.66
2018	Billesdon Brook	Sean Levey	Richard Hannon Jr.	Pall Mall Partners	1:36.62
2019	Hermosa	Wayne Lordan	Aidan O'Brien	Magnier / Tabor / Smith	1:36.89
2020 (Note: The 2020 race was run in June due to the COVID-19 pandemic in the United Kingdom)	Love	Ryan Moore	Aidan O'Brien	Magnier / Tabor / Smith	1:35.80
2021	Mother Earth	Frankie Dettori	Aidan O'Brien	Magnier / Tabor / Smith	1:36.37
2022	Cachet	James Doyle	George Boughey	Highclere T'Bred Racing - Wild Flower	1:36.55
2023	Mawj	Oisin Murphy	Saeed bin Suroor	Godolphin	1:37.92
2024	Elmalka	Silvestre De Sousa	Roger Varian	Sheikh Ahmed Al Maktoum	1:37.05
2025	Desert Flower	William Buick	Charlie Appleby	Godolphin	1:36.81
2026	True Love	Wayne Lordan	Aidan O'Brien	Magnier / Tabor / Smith	1:35.14

== See also ==
- Horse racing in Great Britain
- List of British flat horse races
