= Apology (horse) =

British Thoroughbred racehorse

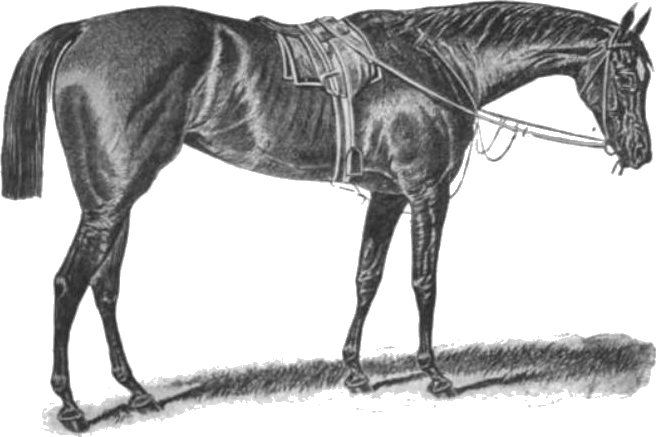
- Apology
- Sire: Adventurer
- Grandsire: Newminster
- Dam: Mandragora
- Damsire: Rataplan
- Sex: Mare
- Foaled: 1871
- Country: United Kingdom
- Colour: Chestnut
- Breeder: Rev. John William King ("Mr. Launde")
- Owner: Rev. John William King
- Trainer: John Osborne
- Record: 20 starts, 8 wins
- Earnings: £14,445

Major wins
- 1,000 Guineas Stakes (1874); Epsom Oaks (1874); St. Leger Stakes (1874); Coronation Stakes (1874); Ascot Gold Cup (1876)

Honours
- Third winner of Fillies' Triple Crown

Apology (1871–1888) was a British Thoroughbred racemare who was the third winner of the Fillies' Triple Crown, winning The Oaks, 1,000 Guineas Stakes and St. Leger Stakes in 1874. Apology was bred and owned by the Reverend John William King, the vicar of Ashby de la Launde, whose ownership of the mare caused a minor scandal in the Church of England after Apology won the St. Leger Stakes. King ultimately had to resign his clerical appointments due to the scandal and died shortly thereafter of a chronic illness. Apology raced until she was five years old, winning the Ascot Gold Cup in 1876. She was retired from racing at the end of 1876 to become a broodmare initially for the widow of John King, and then for Clare Vyner. Apology was euthanised in 1888 after an extended illness.

== Background ==
Apology was bred by the Reverend John William King, who owned her during her racing career. King was the vicar of Ashby de la Launde and had inherited his father Colonel Neville King's Thoroughbred stud and racing stables at the death of his elder brother. Rev. King lived at Ashby Hall in Lincolnshire and raced his horses under the nom de course "Mr. Launde" from 1861 until his death in 1875.

Apology's sire, Adventurer, was a good runner over long distances, winning the City and Suburban Handicap and Ascot Gold Vase as a four-year-old. Adventurer also sired the Classic winners Pretender and Wheel of Fortune. Apology's dam, Mandragora, was bred by W. H. Brook in 1860 and was sired by the Ascot Gold Cup and Doncaster Cup winner Rataplan. Mandragora was the first foal produced by Manganese and was a full sister to the mare Mineral, the dam of the St. Leger winner Wenlock and Derby winner Kisber. Mandragora was a small chestnut mare and was not a successful racehorse at two or three years old. Her racing prowess deemed "not good enough to win a bridle at a fair", she was retired from racing to become a broodmare at Ashgill. Apology was Mandragora's sixth foal and one of four sired by Adventurer. Apology's full sister Agility was a successful racehorse, winning the York Cup twice and the Park Hill Stakes. Another unraced full sister, Analogy, was exported to France and became the dam of the good French long-distance runner Elf. Apology's half-siblings include the good colt Mandrake.

Apology was described by The Times as "a fine looking, powerful chestnut filly, and though a little hollow backed, has very muscular hind quarters, which made her appear somewhat short of work." Her name, "Apology", may have been a tongue in cheek reference to Reverend King's involvement with the turf despite being a member of the clergy, as he did also name his 1875 Derby contender, "Holy Friar".

== Racing career ==
Apology was trained at Ashgill stables near Middleham in Yorkshire by the Osborne brothers: William, Robert and John. Apology was the third filly, after Formosa and Hannah, to win The Oaks, St. Leger Stakes and 1,000 Guineas Stakes, a series of races now designated as the Fillies Triple Crown.

=== 1873: two-year-old season ===
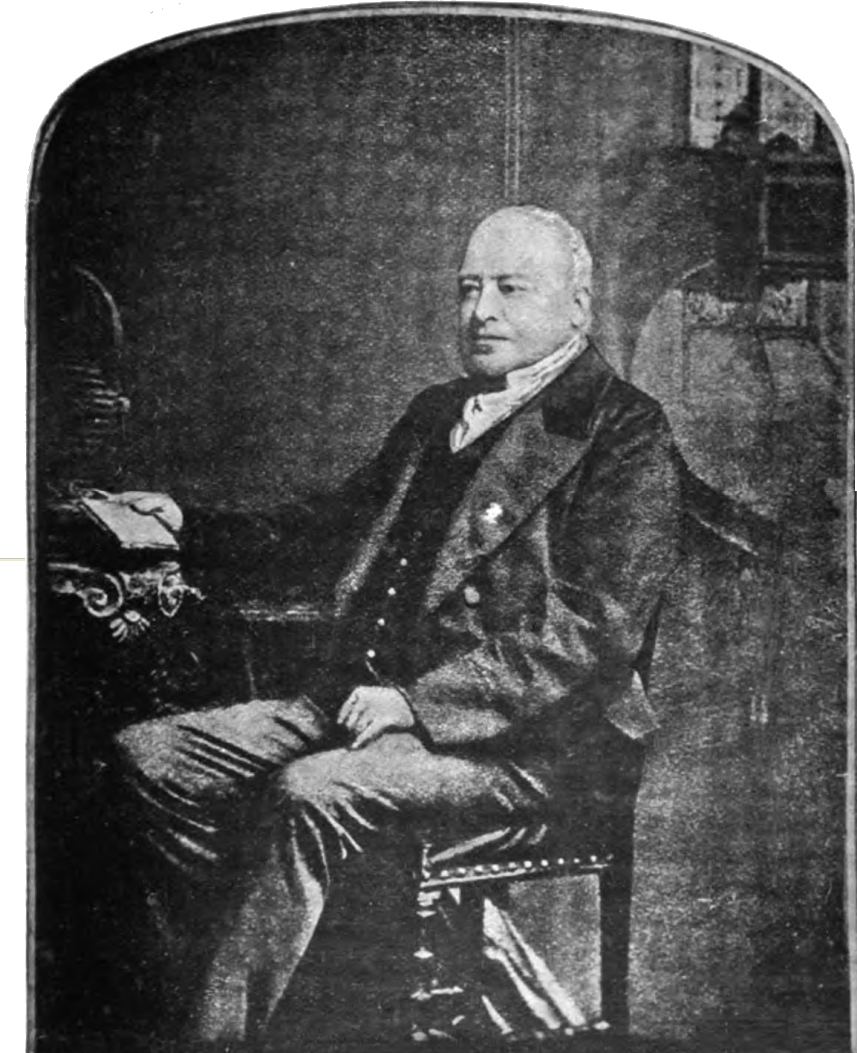
Apology was bred and owned during her racing career by John William King, the vicar of Ashby de la Launde.

At Goodwood on 29 July, Apology finished third to Lord Falmouth's colt Atlantic and Mr. Lefevre's colt Regal in the three quarters of a mile Ham Produce Stakes. A few weeks later at Stockton, Apology was beaten by the colt De Cambis in the £260 Lambton Plate. At York, Apology finished second to Mr. Merry's colt Sir William Wallace in the North of England Biennial Stakes. Apology finished second and last to the future Epsom Derby winner George Frederick by half a length in the Municipal Stakes run at Doncaster. In her final start of the year, Apology won the Home-bred Stakes at the Newmarket-Houghton Meeting, beating Lord Falmouth's Blanchefleur and Lord Ailesbury's Aventurière.

=== 1874: three-year-old season ===
==== Spring ====
On 8 May, Apology ran in the 1,000 Guineas Stakes against a field of nine horses. The race favourites were Apology, La Coureuse, and Lady Bothwell. At the start of the race, the runners broke evenly and continued in a line for the first 200 yards, when La Coureuse took the lead at the Bushes-hill. Apology took the lead on the ascent up the Abingdon Mile Bottom, overtaking the leaders halfway up the hill and winning the race by a margin of three quarters of a length. The second-place finisher La Coureuse and third place horse Blanchefleur were separated by the same distance.

==== Summer ====
On 17 June, Apology won the Coronation Stakes, beating Blanchefleur. In July at Epsom, Apology won The Oaks against a field of 11 horses. The race was deemed "over" after Apology took the lead at the mile-post, beating Miss Toto and Lady Patricia while running at a canter. In August at the York meeting, Apology finished second by a head to the colt Trent in the Great Yorkshire Handicap after maintaining the lead throughout the race and carrying five extra pounds.

==== Autumn ====
In the weeks before the St. Leger, the race had been built up as a match between the "north country mare" Apology and the south country contender George Frederick. On the morning of the running, George Frederick was withdrawn from competition due to injury. Rumours had also begun to circulate the day before the race that Apology had gone lame after a practice gallop and that her leg had been soaked the entire night in a bucket of cold water. Allegedly, John Osborne had sent John King a telegram about potentially withdrawing the mare from competition with King wiring back, "She must start, if it's only on three legs" due to the large sums of money the public had wagered on the mare. Another version of the tale holds that Osborne did not receive King's reply in time for the race and acted on his own judgement, deciding to run Apology after noting the filly's lameness had greatly improved overnight. After a false start, the 13 horses broke well from the starting line, with Boulet taking the lead until crossing the road that ran across the course. Leolinus and Atlantic closely followed Boulet until Atlantic broke a blood vessel at the mile post. Boulet ceded the lead to Apology (ridden by her trainer John Osborne) at the Red House, with Apology moving to the centre of the course flanked on the rail by Leolinus and on the outside by Trent. Apology won the St. Leger by a length and a half "amidst the greatest excitement ever witnessed on the Town Moor" in a time of three minutes and 16 seconds, setting a new race record.

==== Scandal ====
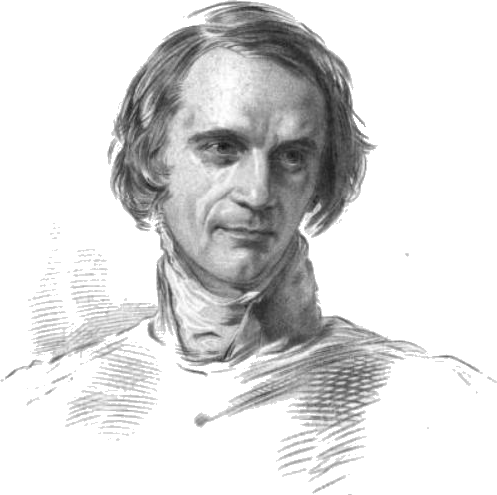
Christopher Wordsworth, the Bishop of Lincoln, disapproved of King's participation in Thoroughbred racing and forced King's resignation from the Church in 1874.

After Apology's highly publicised win in the St. Leger, Christopher Wordsworth, the Bishop of Lincoln, learnt that "Mr. Launde" was actually a vicar within his authoritative oversight. Greatly displeased with a clergyman being actively involved in a profession that facilitated gambling, the Bishop wrote to Reverend King in October 1874 demanding that King either give up racing Thoroughbreds or resign his position with the Church. In his letter, the Bishop stated he would use all the powers at his disposal, including legal if necessary, to compel King to relinquish the trade:

Whether the law in its present state, which needs amendment, may enable a Bishop to correct such offenses as these I cannot say with certainty, but I had rather appeal to your own conscience without resorting to legal proceedings, and I now entreat you once more, solemnly and affectionately, in the name of our Blessed Lord ... either to resign your pastoral cures or else to relinquish a course which seems to me to be altogether at variance with the sacred obligations by which you are bound as a clergyman of the Church of England.

At the time, the 82-year-old Reverend King was seriously ill due to a thigh bone fracture he had sustained some months previously and a condition described as "gout in the stomach". While King did tend to his racehorses personally, he had only been seen three times in his life on a racecourse, never wagered, and had largely retired from his clerical duties, instead employing a curate to do most of his parochial work. One of King's friends defended his actions by stating that the breeding of Thoroughbreds was all but expected of a man of property and the "Squire of Ashby". Reverend King agreed to relinquish his clerical position and wrote to the Bishop of Lincoln:

My Lord, with reference to your present letter, it is true that now for more than fifty years I have bred and sometimes had in training horses for the turf. They are horses of a breed highly prized, which I inherited with my estate, and have been in my family for generations. It may be difficult, perhaps, to decide what constitutes a scandal in the Church; but I cannot think that in my endeavours to perpetuate this breed and thus improve the horses in this country, an object of general interest at the present moment—I have done anything to incur your lordship's censure ... if, therefore, I resign the livings which I hold within your lordship's diocese, it will be not from any consciousness of wrong, or from fear of any consequences which might ensue in the ecclesiastical courts, but simply because I desire to live the remainder of my days in peace and charity with all men ...

=== 1875–1876: four and five-year-old seasons ===
Reverend King died on 9 May 1875 shortly after resigning his clerical position. At King's death, all of Apology's racing engagements for 1875 were declared forfeit. Ownership of the filly was retained by King's widow, Annie Maria King, who raced the mare under the pseudonym "Mr. Seabrook". The pseudonym was derived from the name of King's friend and will executor Dr. W. H. Brook's son, C. Brook being responsible for managing King's stable. Apology did not recover her three-year-old form, finishing fourth in the Goodwood Cup and fifth in the Great Ebor Handicap Stakes at the York August meeting. During the remainder of the year, Apology was fourth in the Doncaster Cup, fifth in the Cesarwitch Stakes and second in the Jockey Club Cup. As a five-year-old in 1876, Apology was unplaced in the Ebor Handicap and won three races: the Queen's Plate at Manchester, the Ascot Gold Cup and the Newcastle Queen's Plate. In the Gold Cup, Apology won "without much effort" from the 1875 St Leger winner Craig Millar. Apology injured her leg before the Goodwood meeting and was retired from racing.

== Breeding career ==
Apology was retired in 1876 and initially was retained as a broodmare by King's widow. In September 1880, Apology was sold to Clare Vyner for 3,200 guineas and relocated to his Fairfield Stud. Apology became ill during the later part of 1887 and was ultimately euthanised in April 1888 after foaling a filly sired by The Lambkin. Her veterinarian, Mr. Snarry, described finding small, wart-like growths covering most of her organs.

=== Full progeny list ===
Apology produced five colts and three fillies between 1878 and her death in 1888. While Apology did not produce offspring as good at racing as she was, her colts, Esterling and Aperse, were successful on the turf.

- Ability (1878), chestnut filly sired by Scottish Chief
- Chestnut filly (1880) by Scottish Chief
- Juventus (1881), bay colt by Wild Oats, Juventus was sent to Spain in 1884
- Esterling (1882), chestnut colt by Sterling, Esterling won the Craven Stakes and was second in the Kempton Grand Park Prize in 1885
- Aperse (1885), chestnut colt by Camballo, Aperse won 12 races during his career and was a breeding stallion at the Fairfield Stud
- Apologist (1886), chestnut colt by Camballo
- Bidston (1887), chestnut colt by Rosebery, Bidston was sent to Buenos Aires in 1889
- Filly (1888) by The Lambkin, this filly died before racing age

== Pedigree ==
Pedigree of Apology (GB), Chestnut Mare, 1871
Sire Adventurer (GB) Bay, 1859	Newminster; 1848	Touchstone	Camel
Sire Adventurer (GB) Bay, 1859	Newminster; 1848	Touchstone	Banter
Sire Adventurer (GB) Bay, 1859	Newminster; 1848	Beeswing	Doctor Syntax
Sire Adventurer (GB) Bay, 1859	Newminster; 1848	Beeswing	Ardrossan Mare
Sire Adventurer (GB) Bay, 1859	Palma; 1840	Emilius	Orville
Sire Adventurer (GB) Bay, 1859	Palma; 1840	Emilius	Emily
Sire Adventurer (GB) Bay, 1859	Palma; 1840	Francesca	Partisan
Sire Adventurer (GB) Bay, 1859	Palma; 1840	Francesca	Orville Mare
Dam Mandragora (GB) Chestnut, 1860	Rataplan; 1850	The Baron	Birdcatcher
Dam Mandragora (GB) Chestnut, 1860	Rataplan; 1850	The Baron	Echidna
Dam Mandragora (GB) Chestnut, 1860	Rataplan; 1850	Pocahontas	Glencoe
Dam Mandragora (GB) Chestnut, 1860	Rataplan; 1850	Pocahontas	Marpessa
Dam Mandragora (GB) Chestnut, 1860	Manganese; 1853	Birdcatcher	Sir Hercules
Dam Mandragora (GB) Chestnut, 1860	Manganese; 1853	Birdcatcher	Guiccioli
Dam Mandragora (GB) Chestnut, 1860	Manganese; 1853	Moonbeam	Tomboy
Dam Mandragora (GB) Chestnut, 1860	Manganese; 1853	Moonbeam	Lunatic (Family 4)
