= Natagora =

French-bred Thoroughbred racehorse

- Sire: Divine Light
- Grandsire: Sunday Silence
- Dam: Reinamixa
- Damsire: Linamix
- Sex: Mare
- Foaled: 18 February 2005
- Country: France
- Colour: Grey
- Breeder: Bertrand Gouin & Georges Duca
- Owner: Stefan Friborg
- Trainer: Pascal Bary
- Record: 15: 7-4-2
- Earnings: £797,122

Major wins
- Prix du Bois (2007); Prix Robert Papin (2007); Cheveley Park Stakes (2007); 1000 Guineas (2008)

Awards
- European Champion Two-year-old Filly (2007)

Natagora was a French champion Thoroughbred racehorse and broodmare, named after a Belgian NGO. She won five of her seven starts as a two-year-old including the Group One Cheveley Park Stakes and the Group Two Prix Robert Papin. She was named European Champion Two-year old Filly at the Cartier Racing Awards. As a three-year-old she recorded her most important victory when taking the Classic 1000 Guineas. Although she never won again she finished placed in the Prix du Jockey Club, Prix Rothschild, Prix Jacques Le Marois and Prix de la Forêt. After her racing career ended she had some success as broodmare, producing a number of winning foals. Natagora was one of an outstanding generation of French-trained fillies which also included Zarkava and Goldikova.

== Background ==
Natagora was a grey filly bred in France by Bertrand Gouin & Georges Duca. She was sired by the Japanese stallion Divine Light a son of Sunday Silence, out of Reinamixa. Divine Light was a successful sprinter who stood as a sire in Japan, France and Turkey. Reinamixa, from whom Natagora inherited her grey coat, won one minor race in a brief racing career. As a descendant of the broodmare Our Liz, Natagora came from the same branch of Thoroughbred family 4-i which produced the King George VI and Queen Elizabeth Stakes winner Ile de Bourbon.

As a yearling, Natagora was consigned by the Haras de Lonray to the Arqana sale at Deauville in October 2006. She was bought for €30,000 by Patick Barbe. Natagora was subsequently sold to Stefan Friborg and went into training with Pascal Bary. She was ridden in most of her important races by Christophe Lemaire.

== Racing career ==
=== 2007: two-year-old season ===
Natagora made her first appearance on a racecourse at Saint-Cloud on 1 May where she finished second in a maiden race to a filly named Faslen. Eighteen days later she recorded her first win in an 1100m race at Chantilly, beating Fleurina by two and a half lengths.

In June Natagora was moved up to Listed class for the Prix La Flèche at Longchamp and won easily by four lengths from Jane Blue. On 1 July, Natagora was promoted to Group Three standard for the Prix du Bois at Maisons-Laffitte. She started even money favourite and won by three-quarters of a length from Wilki. Natagora returned to Maisons-Laffitte three weeks later for the Group Two Prix Robert Papin. She started odds-on favourite and won from the Italian filly Magritte, with the English colt Strike the Deal in third. In August, Natagora was sent to Deauville to contest the Group One Prix Morny. She led until the closing stages when she was overtaken and beaten two lengths by the Irish=trained colt Myboycharlie.

On her final start of the season, Natagora was sent to England for the Cheveley Park Stakes at Newmarket on 7 October. The Michael Stoute-trained Visit started favourite, with Natagora being made joint second favourite on 7/2 alongside Fleeting Spirit. Lemaire sent Natagora into the lead from the start, and she ran on strongly in the closing stages to win by a neck from Fleeting Spirit, with Visit finishing unplaced. The race was Bary's first major winner in England.

=== 2008: three-year-old season ===
Natagora began her three-year-old season in the Listed Prix Imprudence at Maisons-Laffitte. She started odds-on favourite and won by one and a half lengths from Modern Look. The filly appeared to cope well with the extremely soft ground and demonstrated a more relaxed racing style than she had shown the previous year. After the race Lemaire described her as "really, really special". She then returned to England to contest the 1000 Guineas over one mile at Newmarket. She started 11/4 favourite in a field of fifteen, with her main rivals appearing to be the undefeated English fillies Infallible and Spacious who started at odds of 7/2 and 11/2 respectively. Natagora took the lead after two furlongs and was never headed, being driven out by Lemaire in the closing stages to win by half a length from Spacious, with the Irish challenger Saoirse Abu in third. Spacious appeared a slightly unlucky loser, having been blocked when attempting to challenge for the lead.

In her next race, Natagora was matched against male opposition in the Prix du Jockey Club at Chantilly in June, attempting to become the first filly to win the race for 134 years. With Lemaire riding the favourite High Rock, the filly was partnered by Frankie Dettori and started at odds of 7/2 against nineteen colts. Dettori tracked the leaders before sending Natagora into the lead in the straight. She was overtaken in the closing stages and finished third to Vision d'Etat and Famous Name. After a break of two months, Natagora was moved back in distance for the Prix Rothschild at Deauville. She started favourite but finished third behind Goldikova and Darjina. Two weeks later, over the same course and distance, she finished second to Tamayuz in the Prix Jacques Le Marois.

On 7 September, in the Prix du Moulin de Longchamp, Natagora finished sixth behind Goldikova, Darjina, Paco Boy (subsequently disqualified), Sageburg and Henrythenavigator. It was the first time she had finished out of the first three. On her final appearance in Europe, Natagora finished second to Paco Boy in the Prix de la Forêt in October. In December, she was sent to Hong Kong for the Hong Kong Mile but after racing in second for much of the way, she faded to finish eleventh of the fourteen runners behind Good Ba Ba.

== Assessment ==
Natagora was named European Champion Two-year-old filly at the Cartier Racing Awards.

In the International Classification for 2007, Natagora was given a rating of 118, making her officially the second best two-year-old filly in Europe after Zarkava.

== Breeding record ==
In January 2009, it was announced that Natagora had been bought by Hamdan Al Maktoum and would be retired to a new career as a broodmare. Natagora's first foal was a filly by Nayef named Rayaheen, who won her debut at Nottingham Racecourse in June 2012.

- 2010 Rayaheen (GB) : Bay filly, foaled 9 February, by Nayef (USA) – won 1 race from 6 starts in England 2012/13
- 2011 Mumtaza (GB) : Bay filly, foaled 31 March, by Nayef (USA) – unplaced in 3 starts in England 2013–14
- 2013 Raaqy (IRE) : Grey filly, foaled 30 March, by Dubawi (IRE) – won 1 race and placed twice, including 3rd LR Star Fillies' S, Sandown from 7 starts in England 2015–16
- 2014 Mankib (GB) : Chesnut colt, foaled 19 April, by Tamayuz (GB) – won 2 races and placed 2nd once from 4 starts to date (14/05/17) in France 2016–17
- 2016 Covered by Frankel (GB) in 2015

Natagora was euthanized in 2019 after suffering health problems.

== Pedigree ==
Pedigree of Natagora (FR), grey mare, 2005
Sire Divine Light (JPN) 1995	Sunday Silence; 1986	Halo	Hail To Reason
Sire Divine Light (JPN) 1995	Sunday Silence; 1986	Halo	Cosmah
Sire Divine Light (JPN) 1995	Sunday Silence; 1986	Wishing Well	Understanding
Sire Divine Light (JPN) 1995	Sunday Silence; 1986	Wishing Well	Mountain Flower
Sire Divine Light (JPN) 1995	Meld Sport; 1979	Northern Taste	Northern Dancer
Sire Divine Light (JPN) 1995	Meld Sport; 1979	Northern Taste	Lady Victoria
Sire Divine Light (JPN) 1995	Meld Sport; 1979	Shadai Prima	Marino
Sire Divine Light (JPN) 1995	Meld Sport; 1979	Shadai Prima	Night and Day
Dam Reinamixa (FR) 1994	Linamix; 1987	Mendez	Bellypha
Dam Reinamixa (FR) 1994	Linamix; 1987	Mendez	Miss Carina
Dam Reinamixa (FR) 1994	Linamix; 1987	Lunadix	Breton
Dam Reinamixa (FR) 1994	Linamix; 1987	Lunadix	Lutine
Dam Reinamixa (FR) 1994	Reine Margie; 1981	Margouillat	Diatome
Dam Reinamixa (FR) 1994	Reine Margie; 1981	Margouillat	Tita
Dam Reinamixa (FR) 1994	Reine Margie; 1981	Reine des Sables	Mincio
Dam Reinamixa (FR) 1994	Reine Margie; 1981	Reine des Sables	Begrolles (Family: 4-i)
