= Galeazzo Visconti =

Galeazzo Visconti may refer to a number of members of the Italian Visconti dynasty:

- Galeazzo I Visconti (1277–1328), lord of Milan from 1322 to 1327
- Galeazzo II Visconti (c.1320–1378), lord of Milan from 1349 to 1378
- Gian Galeazzo Visconti (1351–1402), lord of Milan from 1378 to 1402, becoming its first duke in 1395
- Galeazzo Visconti (envoy) (1455–1531), in 1499, envoy for Ludovico Sforza, the Duke of Milan at the Treaty of Basel (1499)
