= Galeazzo Rivelli =

Italian painter

Galeazzo Rivelli (also called Galeazzo della Barba) was an Italian painter of the 14th century, active in Cremona.
