= Michael Jarvis =

British horse trainer (1938–2011)

Personal information
- Born: 14 October 1938 Lewes, Sussex, England
- Died: 20 September 2011 (aged 71)
- Occupation: Trainer

Horse racing career
- Sport: Horse racing

Major racing wins
- British Classic Race wins: 1,000 Guineas (1); Epsom Oaks (1)

Significant horses
- Beldale Flutter, Easter Sun, Carroll House, Ameerat, Rakti, Eswarah

Michael Jarvis (14 August 1938 – 20 September 2011) was a Thoroughbred horse trainer in England. Based in Newmarket, Jarvis trained numerous Group One winners including three winners of the British Haydock Sprint Cup. Jarvis's horses also won important races in Ireland, Germany and Italy. He kept approximately 80 horses in training, and his main jockey was Philip Robinson. Jarvis's career spanned almost 40 years from his first win at the top-rated Haydock Sprint Cup in 1969 to his 2007 win of the Italian Premio Roma.

He announced his decision to retire on 22 February 2011 with almost immediate effect, handing over the yard to his long-time assistant Roger Varian. This was due to ill health – Jarvis had undergone surgery for a heart condition and was also suffering from prostate cancer, and said in the months running up to his retirement that his health had deteriorated. He died on 20 September 2011 at the age of 73.

== Major wins ==
France

- Prix de l'Arc de Triomphe – (1) – Carroll House (1989)
- Prix du Jockey Club – (1) – Holding Court (2000)

(United Kingdom) Great Britain

- Haydock Sprint Cup – (3) – Tudor Music (1969), Green God (1971), Petong (1984)
- International Stakes – (1) – Beldale Flutter (1981)
- Coronation Cup – (1) – Easter Sun (1982)
- Lancashire Oaks – (2) – Noushkey (1999), Ela Athena (2000)
- 1,000 Guineas – (1) – Ameerat (2001)
- Champion Stakes – (1) – Rakti (2003)
- Prince of Wales's Stakes – (1) – Rakti (2004)
- Queen Elizabeth II Stakes – (1) Rakti (2004)
- Chester Cup – (2) – Anak Pekan (2004 & 2005)
- Lockinge Stakes – (1) – Rakti (2005)
- Epsom Oaks – (1) – Eswarah (2005)

(Republic of Ireland) Ireland

- Irish Champion Stakes – (1) – Carroll House (1989)
- Pretty Polly Stakes – Tarfshi (2002)

Germany

- Bayerisches Zuchtrennen – (1) – Pressing (2009)
- Grosser Preis von Baden – (2) – Carroll House (1988), Morshdi (2001)

Italy

- Gran Premio d'Italia – (1) – Welsh Guide (1988)
- Premio Roma – (2) – Welsh Guide (1988), Pressing (2007)
- Derby Italiano – (2) – Prorutori (1989), Morshdi (2001)
- Premio Presidente della Repubblica – (3) – Bob Back (1985), Polar Prince (1998), Rakti (2003)
