= Ahmed bin Rashid Al Maktoum =

Emirati public official (1950–2026)

Sheikh Ahmed bin Rashid Al Maktoum
- أحمد بن راشد آل مكتوم
- Born: 12 July 1950; Bur Dubai, Dubai, Trucial States
- Died: 21 September 2026 (aged 76); Bur Dubai, Dubai, United Arab Emirates
- Occupation: Lieutenant General
- House: Al Maktoum
- Father: Rashid bin Saeed Al Maktoum
- Mother: Latifa bint Hamdan Al Nahyan

Sheikh Ahmed bin Rashid Al Maktoum (Arabic: أحمد بن راشد آل مكتوم; 12 July 1950 – 21 September 2026) was an Emirati public official who was the Deputy Chairman of Dubai Police & Public Security, Group Chairman of A.R.M. Holding and Dubai Real Estate Centre and Chairman of the Al Wasl FC club located in Dubai.

Al Maktoum was the fourth and youngest son of the former ruler, Rashid bin Saeed Al Maktoum (1912–1990) and the youngest and last surviving brother of the ruler of Dubai, vice president and prime minister of the United Arab Emirates, Mohammed bin Rashid Al Maktoum.

== Education and early career ==
Al Maktoum graduated from the Royal Military Academy Sandhurst, joined the Central Military Command in Dubai and became its Commander in Chief, developing it into one of the leading military bases in the United Arab Emirates.

== Business interests ==
Al Maktoum's business interests included the Dubai Real Estate Centre (DREC) established in 1991 with more than 3200 units across the residential, commercial, retail and industrial real estate segments in Dubai under its management and operation.

In 2019, Al Maktoum consolidated his assets under A.R.M. Holding, one of the biggest investment companies in Dubai mandated with supporting the Emirate of Dubai's growth. The conglomerate holds in addition to Dubai Real Estate Centre, Huna and Hive Coliv and equity stakes in private and publicly listed companies in a variety of sectors globally including Education, F&B, Real Estate, Banking, Telecommunications and Hospitality.

== Sportsmanship ==
Al Maktoum founded in 1960 Al Wasl Sports Club, which he also chaired, and one of the most popular football clubs in the UAE, Al Wasl Football Club. Both clubs are the recipients of numerous titles and have a sizeable following.

He was one of the main figures responsible for the creation and launch of Dubai International Marine Club and was its first chairman in 1988. The club is the first in the Middle East and Africa to be a member in UIM.

== Horsemanship ==
Al Maktoum was an avid horseman and created the Jebel Ali Racecourse to promote horse racing in the UAE and launched Al Adiyat and Dubai Horse Racing Centre in support of the industry. He and his team helped develop the handicapping system and other rules of racing.

He claimed his first win in 1982 when his first horse, Wassl, won the Irish 2000 Guineas and the Craven Stakes. Other horses owned by Sheikh Ahmed have won the 1000 Guineas, Irish Oaks, Irish St Lager, Dewhurst Stakes, Gold Cup, Dubai Golden Shaheen, UAE 2000 Guineas, Italian Derby, Prince of Wales Stakes, Coral Eclipse Stakes Pretty Polly stakes and Queen Elizabeth Stakes in Australia, with Addeybb. Mtoto, Al Maktoum's most celebrated stallion, won seven out of ten races throughout his racing career that lasted between 1985 and 1988, most notable of which were the King George VI and Queen Elizabeth Stakes in 1988.

== Death ==
Al Maktoum died on 21 September 2026, at the age of 76.
