= Philip Robinson (jockey) =

English former flat racing jockey (born 1961)

Philip Peter Robinson (born 10 January 1961) is a former English flat racing jockey.

The son of Peter Robinson, a jockey and trainer, he rode his first winner in 1978 at Great Yarmouth. He was British flat racing Champion Apprentice in 1979 and 1980. One of his most famous victories was his win on Pebbles, trained by Clive Brittain, in the 1984 1,000 Guineas at Newmarket. His second victory in this race came in 2001 on Ameerat, trained by Michael Jarvis. Robinson rode in Hong Kong for six years from 1987, becoming Champion Jockey there on two occasions, in 1988-89 and 1989–90, making him the only English Jockey to achieve this feat.

He was the regular jockey for the Michael Jarvis stable for many years; however on Jarvis' retirement in early 2011, Robinson moved to ride for veteran trainer Clive Brittain. Robinson then retired in October 2011.

== Major wins ==
(United Kingdom) Great Britain

- 1,000 Guineas - (2) - Pebbles (1984), Ameerat (2001)
- Champion Stakes - (1) - Rakti (2003)
- Coronation Cup - (1) - Warrsan (2003)
- Coronation Stakes - (2) - Katies (1984), Crimplene (2000)
- Lockinge Stakes - (1) - Rakti (2005)
- Nassau Stakes - (1) - Crimplene (2000)
- Prince of Wales's Stakes - (1) - Rakti (2004)
- Queen Elizabeth II Stakes - (1) - Rakti (2004)
- St. Leger - (1) - Bob's Return (1993)

France

- Prix du Jockey Club - (1) - Holding Court (2000)

Germany

- Grosser Preis von Baden - (1) - Morshdi (2001)
- German 1,000 Guineas - (1) -Crimplene (2000)

(Republic of Ireland) Ireland

- Irish 1,000 Guineas - (2) - Katies (1984), Crimplene (2000)
- Pretty Polly Stakes - (1) - Tarfshi (2002)

Italy

- Derby Italiano - (1) - Morshdi (2001)
- Premio Presidente della Repubblica - (2) - Polar Prince (1998), Rakti (2003)

Hong Kong

- Hong Kong Gold Cup - (2) - Starlight (1990, 1991)
- Hong Kong Champions & Chater Cup - (1) - San Domenico (1989)

Netherlands

- Derby Netherlands - (1) - Notre Plaisier (1980)
- Netherlands Championship Thoroughbreds - (1) - Boxberger Beauty (1982)

== See also ==
- List of jockeys
