= Turtle Island (horse) =

Irish-bred Thoroughbred racehorse

- Sire: Fairy King
- Grandsire: Northern Dancer
- Dam: Sisania
- Damsire: High Top
- Sex: Stallion
- Foaled: 16 March 1991
- Country: Ireland
- Colour: Bay
- Breeder: Ron Con Ltd and Swettenham Stud
- Owner: Robert Sangster
- Trainer: Peter Chapple-Hyam
- Record: 13:6-1-3
- Earnings: £416,083

Major wins
- Norfolk Stakes (1993); Phoenix Stakes (1993); Gimcrack Stakes (1993); Greenham Stakes (1994); Irish 2,000 Guineas (1994)

Turtle Island (16 March 1991 – 4 July 2014) was an Irish-bred, British-trained Thoroughbred racehorse and sire. He was one of the leading British two-year-olds of 1993 when he won four of his seven races including the Norfolk Stakes, Phoenix Stakes and Gimcrack Stakes. In the following year he won the Greenham Stakes before winning the Irish 2,000 Guineas by fifteen lengths. He was beaten in his three remaining races and was retired to stud, where he had some success as a sire of winners.

== Background ==
Turtle Island was a bay colt with a small white star bred in Ireland by Ron Con Ltd and Robert Sangster's Swettenham Stud. Turtle Island's sire, Fairy King, who was full-brother to Sadler's Wells, failed to win a race after being injured on his debut, but sired the winners of over 500 races, including Helissio (Prix de l'Arc de Triomphe), Oath (Derby), Pharaoh's Delight (Phoenix Stakes), Encosta De Lago (Vic Health Cup), Princely Heir (Phoenix Stakes) and Falbrav (2003 European Champion Older Horse) and Beckett (National Stakes). His dam, Sisania, was descendant of the French mare Batika, making her a distant relative of the three-time Grand National winner Red Rum.

In September 1992 the yearling colt was sent to the sales at Doncaster where he was bought for 23,000 guineas by Frank Barry. During his racing career, Turtle Island raced in the green and blue silks of Robert Sangster and was trained by Peter Chapple-Hyam at Manton in Wiltshire. He was ridden in all of his races by John Reid.

== Racing career ==
=== 1993: two-year-old season ===
Turtle Island made his racecourse debut in a five furlong maiden race at Newbury Racecourse on 17 April in which he started the 13/8 favourite in a field of eight runners. He took the lead approaching the final furlong and drew clear of the field by five lengths. The colt was then moved up in class for the Group Three Norfolk Stakes at Royal Ascot in June. Starting the 3/1 second favourite he raced just behind the leaders before taking the lead a furlong out and winning by three and a half lengths from Gold Land. Turtle Island started odds-on favourite for the July Stakes over six furlong at Newmarket Racecourse but was never able to challenge for the lead and finished fourth of the six runners behind First Trump. Ten days later, Turtle Island contested the Super Sprint Trophy at Newbury in which he carried top weight of 133 pounds and finished third of the sixteen runners behind the Queen Mary Stakes winner Risky.

On 8 August, Turtle Island was sent to Ireland for the Group One Phoenix Stakes over six furlongs at Leopardstown Racecourse and started the 7/4 favourite. He was among the leaders from the start before establishing an advantage inside the last quarter mile and winning by half a length from Las Meninas, a filly who went on to win the 1000 Guineas. Ten days after his win in Ireland, Turtle Island was sent to York Racecourse for the Gimcrack Stakes in which he carried top weight of 131 pounds and started the 5/2 second favourite. He took the lead approaching the final furlong and stayed on "gamely" after being overtaken by the filly Unblest to regain the lead in the final strides and win by a head. The favourite Mister Baileys, later to win the 2000 Guineas finished sixth of the eight runners. On his final appearance of the season, Turtle Island started the 85/40 favourite for the Group One Middle Park Stakes over six furlongs at Newmarket. He took the lead at half way but was soon overtaken and finished fourth behind First Trump, Owington and Redoubtable.

=== 1994: three-year-old season ===
Turtle Island began his second season at Newbury on 16 April, when he started 2/1 favourite for the Greenham Stakes, a trial race for the 2000 Guineas. The colt pulled hard when Reid attempted to restrain him in the early stages before taking the lead in the final quarter mile and accelerating clear of the field to win in "impressive" style by eight lengths from Luhuk. Turtle Island bypassed the 2000 Guineas, which was run on firm ground, and instead contested the Poule d'Essai des Poulains at Longchamp Racecourse on 8 May. He was held up in the early stages and was last of the eight runners on the final turn. He made progress in the straight, but was beaten a "short neck" by the locally trained Green Tune. A week after his defeat in France, the colt was sent to Ireland for the Irish 2000 Guineas at the Curragh and started 5/4 favourite against eight opponents. Racing on heavy ground, Turtle Island took the lead inside the last quarter mile and drew away from the field to win by fifteen lengths from Guided Tour. Grand Lodge, who had been beaten a short head by Mister Baileys in the 2000 Guineas, finished fourth. After the race, Chapple-Hyam described the winner as "some horse, as good as I have ever trained". John Reid said "When he gets cut in the ground he is different class. I have a very soft spot for Dr Devious but he could not have produced a performance like this".

On 14 June, Turtle Island started 15/8 favourite for the St James's Palace Stakes on firm ground at Royal Ascot, but after briefly taking the lead in the straight he finished third behind Grand Lodge and Distant View. After a break two and a half months he returned in Celebration Mile at Goodwood Racecourse. He was made the 11/10 favourite but finished third of six runners behind the filly Mehthaaf. Turtle Island's last race was the Queen Elizabeth II Stakes at Ascot in September, when he finished sixth of the nine runners behind the 66/1 outsider Maroof.

== Stud record ==
Turtle Island was retired from racing to become a breeding stallion Entered stud in 1995-2001 at Coolmore Stud Ireland Shuttled in 1995-97 to Australia Shuttled in 1999 to New Zealand and made a very impressive start to his stud career, siring the 2000 Guineas winner Island Sands in his first crop of foals. His other offspring included the Prix d'Astarte winner Turtle Bow. He later established himself as a sire of National Hunt horses including Seabass, Bensalem (December Gold Cup) Scolardy (Triumph Hurdle) and An Cathaoir Mor (Arkle Novice Chase) At stud in 2002-04 at Castlehyde Stud Ireland At stud in 2005-09 at Coolmore's Beeches Stud Ireland. At stud in 2010-14 at the Allevamento Torre di Canicarao Italy. He died on 4 July 2014.

== Pedigree ==
Pedigree of Turtle Island (IRE), bay stallion, 1991
| Sire Fairy King (USA) 1982 | Northern Dancer (CAN); 1961 | Nearctic | Nearco |
| Sire Fairy King (USA) 1982 | Northern Dancer (CAN); 1961 | Nearctic | Lady Angela |
| Sire Fairy King (USA) 1982 | Northern Dancer (CAN); 1961 | Natalma | Native Dancer |
| Sire Fairy King (USA) 1982 | Northern Dancer (CAN); 1961 | Natalma | Almahmoud |
| Sire Fairy King (USA) 1982 | Fairy Bridge; 1975 | Bold Reason | Hail To Reason |
| Sire Fairy King (USA) 1982 | Fairy Bridge; 1975 | Bold Reason | Lalun |
| Sire Fairy King (USA) 1982 | Fairy Bridge; 1975 | Special | Forli |
| Sire Fairy King (USA) 1982 | Fairy Bridge; 1975 | Special | Thong |
| Dam Sisania (GB) 1983 | High Top (IRE); 1969 | Derring-Do | Darius |
| Dam Sisania (GB) 1983 | High Top (IRE); 1969 | Derring-Do | Sipsey Bridge |
| Dam Sisania (GB) 1983 | High Top (IRE); 1969 | Camenae | Vimy |
| Dam Sisania (GB) 1983 | High Top (IRE); 1969 | Camenae | Madrilene |
| Dam Sisania (GB) 1983 | Targos Delight (GB); 1976 | Targowice | Round Table |
| Dam Sisania (GB) 1983 | Targos Delight (GB); 1976 | Targowice | Matriarch |
| Dam Sisania (GB) 1983 | Targos Delight (GB); 1976 | Co-Optimist | Never Say Die |
| Dam Sisania (GB) 1983 | Targos Delight (GB); 1976 | Co-Optimist | Madame Caroline (Family: 25) |
