= Princely Heir =

Irish-bred Thoroughbred racehorse

- Sire: Fairy King
- Grandsire: Northern Dancer
- Dam: Meis El-Reem
- Damsire: Auction Ring
- Sex: Stallion
- Foaled: 20 April 1995
- Country: Ireland
- Colour: Bay
- Breeder: Gainsborough Stud
- Owner: Maktoum Al Maktoum; David Abell
- Trainer: Mark Johnston
- Record: 15: 3-1-3
- Earnings: £116,713

Major wins
- Phoenix Stakes (1997)

Awards
- Timeform rating, 111.

Princely Heir (20 April 1995 – December 2013) was an Irish-bred, British-trained Thoroughbred racehorse and sire. He showed his best form as a two-year-old in 1997 when he won three of his four races including the Group 1 Phoenix Stakes in Ireland. He remained in training for a further two seasons but never won again and never even contested another Group 1 race. He retired to become a breeding stallion in Ireland and was later exported to India.

== Background ==
Princely Heir was a bay horse with a white blaze and four white socks bred in Ireland by his owner Maktoum Al Maktoum's Gainsborough Stud. As a yearling at Tattersalls in September 1996 he was sold for 40,000 guineas but returned to the ownership of Maktoum Al Maktoum. During his racing career he was trained by Mark Johnston at Middleham in North Yorkshire.

His sire Fairy King, who was full-brother to Sadler's Wells, failed to win a race after being injured on his debut, but sired the winners of over 500 races, including Helissio (Prix de l'Arc de Triomphe), Oath (Derby), Pharaoh's Delight (Phoenix Stakes), Encosta De Lago (Vic Health Cup), Falbrav (2003 European Champion Older Horse) and Beckett (National Stakes). Princely Heir's dam Meis El-Reem was a top-class racemare who won the Prix d'Astarte and the Child Stakes as well as finishing second to Pebbles in the 1000 Guineas. Meis El-Reem was descended from the Italian broodmare Tresa (foaled 1946) whose most notable offspring was the Prix du Jockey Club winner Tamanar.

== Racing career ==
=== 1997: two-year-old season ===
Princely Heir made his debut in a maiden race over five furlongs at Ripon Racecourse on 28 May in which he was ridden by Jason Weaver. Starting the 11/4 favourite in an eighteen-runner field, he recovered from a slow start to take the lead inside the final furlong and won by two lengths from Batswing. On 4 July with Weaver again in the saddle, Princely Heir started 5/4 favourite for a novice race (for horses with no more than one previous win) over the same distance at Beverley Racecourse. Racing on heavy ground he took the lead from the start, opened up a clear advantage approaching the final furlong and came home nine lengths ahead of his three opponents. Nine days after his win at Beverley, the colt was moved up in class and distance when he was sent to Ireland to contest the Group 3 Curragh Stakes over six and a half furlongs. He was partnered by Darryll Holland and finished third of the five runners behind Lady Alexander and King of Kings.

Jason Weaver resumed his partnership with Princely Heir when the colt was stepped up to Group 1 class for the Phoenix Stakes at Leopardstown Racecourse on 10 August. He started a 12/1 outsider in a nine-runner field which saw the betting market headed by the Godolphin filly Asfurah who had won the Windsor Castle Stakes and the Cherry Hinton Stakes on her last two starts. The other runners included Harbour Master (Coventry Stakes), Tarascon, Pool Music (National Stakes), Hopping Higgins (Cork Stakes) and Flame Violet (Rochestown Stakes). Princely Heir tracked the leader Hopping Higgins but then began to drift left and right as he came under pressure two furlongs out. He kept on strongly however to gain the advantage in the final strides and won by a head from Asfurah with Harbour Master taking third ahead of Hopping Higgins and Tarascon. After the race Mark Johnston said "I have my best bunch of two-year-olds ever and I could hardly believe it when Princely Heir never picked up at the Curragh last time. I gave Jason no instructions other than to let Princely Heir settle into his rhythm and go wherever the horse was happy. When he pulled out from behind Hopping Higgins I knew we could win". The racecourse stewards however, gave Weaver a four-day suspension for excessive use of the whip.

=== 1998: three-year-old season ===
As a three-year-old Princely Heir was ridden in all seven of his races by Darryll Holland. The colt began his season at Nemarket Racecourse in April when he finished fourth to the French-trained Xaar in the one-mile Craven Stakes. In the following month he was sent to Germany for the Mehl-Mülhens-Rennen and finished fourth of the eleven runners behind Tiger Hill. At Royal Ascot in June the colt was dropped back to sprint distances but finished unplaced in the Cork and Orrery Stakes over six furlongs. Princly Heir then ran third in a minor race at Doncaster in July and third in the Hungerford Stakes in August. He then wore blinkers for the first and only time at Deauville Racecourse when he finished fifth in the Prix Quincey. He ended his second season by running second to Handsome Ridge in the Park Stakes at Doncaster in September.

=== 1999: four-year-old season ===
Princely Heir ran four times in 1999 without reproducing his best form. He began by finishing unplaced in the Shergar Cup Classic at Goodwood in May and then ran fourth in a minor race at the same track later that month. He was well beaten in a German Group 3 race in June and then ended his racing career by finishing fourth in a minor event at Yarmouth Racecourse on 1 July.

== Stud record ==
At the end of his racing career Princely Heir was retired to become a breeding stallion. He was based in Ireland for seven years and was then exported to India where he stood at the Dashmesh Stud. The most successful of his offspring has been Stay Young, a stakes winner in both Europe and Hong Kong. Princely Heir was euthanized in December 2013.

== Pedigree ==
Pedigree of Princely Heir (IRE), bay stallion, 1995
Sire Fairy King (USA) 1982	Northern Dancer (CAN); 1961	Nearctic	Nearco
Sire Fairy King (USA) 1982	Northern Dancer (CAN); 1961	Nearctic	Lady Angela
Sire Fairy King (USA) 1982	Northern Dancer (CAN); 1961	Natalma	Native Dancer
Sire Fairy King (USA) 1982	Northern Dancer (CAN); 1961	Natalma	Almahmoud
Sire Fairy King (USA) 1982	Fairy Bridge (USA); 1975	Bold Reason	Hail To Reason
Sire Fairy King (USA) 1982	Fairy Bridge (USA); 1975	Bold Reason	Lalun
Sire Fairy King (USA) 1982	Fairy Bridge (USA); 1975	Special	Forli
Sire Fairy King (USA) 1982	Fairy Bridge (USA); 1975	Special	Thong
Dam Meis El-Reem (IRE) 1981	Auction Ring (USA); 1972	Bold Bidder	Bold Ruler
Dam Meis El-Reem (IRE) 1981	Auction Ring (USA); 1972	Bold Bidder	High Bid
Dam Meis El-Reem (IRE) 1981	Auction Ring (USA); 1972	Hooplah	Hillary
Dam Meis El-Reem (IRE) 1981	Auction Ring (USA); 1972	Hooplah	Beadah
Dam Meis El-Reem (IRE) 1981	Tavella (FR); 1972	Petingo	Petition
Dam Meis El-Reem (IRE) 1981	Tavella (FR); 1972	Petingo	Alcazar
Dam Meis El-Reem (IRE) 1981	Tavella (FR); 1972	Tintoretta	Ribot
Dam Meis El-Reem (IRE) 1981	Tavella (FR); 1972	Tintoretta	Tresa (Family: 16-h)
