= Mujahid (horse) =

American-bred Thoroughbred racehorse (1996–2026)

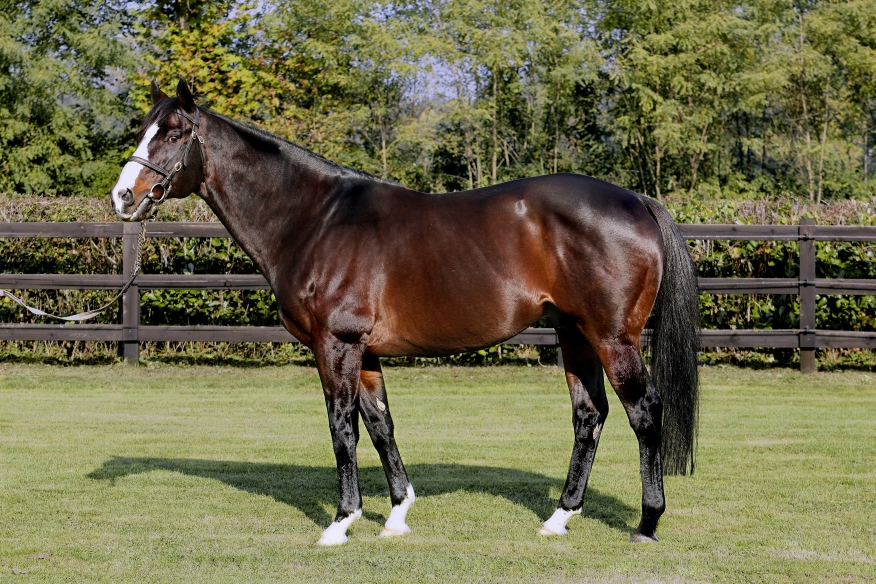
- Mujahid standing at Allevamento di Besnate
- Sire: Danzig
- Grandsire: Northern Dancer
- Dam: Elrafa Ah
- Damsire: Storm Cat
- Sex: Stallion
- Foaled: January 31, 1996
- Died: 3 March 2026 (aged 30)
- Country: United States
- Colour: Bay
- Breeder: Shadwell Farm
- Owner: Hamdan Al Maktoum
- Trainer: John Dunlop
- Record: 12: 3-1-2
- Earnings: £189,134

Major wins
- Dewhurst Stakes (1998)

Awards
- Top-rated European two-year-old (1998)

Mujahid (January 31, 1996 – March 3, 2026) was an American-bred, British-trained Thoroughbred racehorse and sire. Bred and owned by Hamdan Al Maktoum he was trained throughout his racing career in England by John Dunlop. As a two-year-old in 1998 Mujahid won three of his four races and was rated the best of his generation in Europe after recording an upset win in the Dewhurst Stakes. He never won another race although he did finish third in the 2000 Guineas in 1999. After his retirement from racing he became a successful breeding stallion.

== Background ==
Mujahid was a bay horse with a white blaze and three white socks bred in Kentucky by his owner, Hamdan Al Maktoum's Shadwell Farm. The colt was sent to race in Europe and was trained throughout his racing career by John Dunlop at Arundel in West Sussex. He was ridden in all of his races by Richard Hills.

His sire Danzig, who ran only three times before his career was ended by injury, was a highly successful stallion who sired the winners of more than fifty Grade I/Group One races. His offspring include the champions Chief's Crown, Dayjur and Lure as well as the important stallion Danehill. Mujahid was the first foal of his dam Elrafa Ah, successful racemare who won the Dragon Stakes in 1993 and the Bentinck Stakes in 1994. She was a descendant of the American broodmare Sunday Evening who was the female-line ancestor of several major winners including Henrythenavigator, Indian Skimmer, Saffron Walden (Irish 2,000 Guineas) and Dark Mirage.

Mujahid died on March 3, 2026, at the age of 30.

== Racing career ==
=== 1998: two-year-old season ===
Mujahid began his racing career in a six furlong novice race (for horses with no more than one previous win) at Newmarket Racecourse on 8 July and started the 6/1 second favourite behind the odds-on favourite Belasco. After starting slowly, Mujahid began to make progress in the last quarter mile, took the lead from Compatriot inside the final furlong and held off a late challenge from Belasco to win by a head. Two weeks later at Salisbury Racecourse Mujahid started 2/5 favourite for the Trinity Stakes against two opponents. After tracking the leader Boomerang Blade, Mujahid took the lead at half way and drew away to win "very easily" by six lengths from Sunny Fact. The colt was then stepped up in class for the Group Two Gimcrack Stakes at York Racecourse on 19 August and was made the 13/8 favourite ahead of Bertolini (winner of the July Stakes) and Rosselli (Norfolk Stakes). After tracking the leaders, Mujahid struggled to obtain a clear run in the straight and finished fifth of the eight runners behind Josr Algarhoud, Sailing Shoes, Thunder Dragon and Bertolini. John Dunlop later said that the colt had been unsuited by the firm ground.

Despite his defeat at York, Mujahid was moved up in class and distance to contest Britain's most prestigious race for two-year-olds, the Group One Dewhurst Stakes over seven furlongs at Newmarket on 17 October. The joint-favourites were Stravinsky and Enrique (Somerville Tattersall Stakes) whilst Mujahid started a 25/1 outsider. The other four runners were Lujain, Auction House (Champagne Stakes), Raise A Grand (Solario Stakes) and the French challenger Indian Danehill. Mujahid tracked the leader Auction House but appeared outpaced when Enrique went to the front two furlongs out. He rallied when switched to the right by Richard Hills, took the lead inside the final furlong and won by two lengths and a neck from Auction House and Stravinsky. When interviewed after the race John Dunlop told journalists "You pundits always get it wrong" but admitted that he did not think that Mujahid would be "good enough against these cracks".

=== 1999: three-year-old season ===
On his first appearance as a three-year-old Mujahid started odds-on favourite for the Craven Stakes (a major trial race for the 2000 Guineas) over one mile at Newmarket on 15 April. He ran unaccountably badly and finished fifth of the seven runners behind Compton Admiral. Mujahid's groom Steve Gill later commented "We were gobsmacked after Newmarket. We couldn't find anything wrong with him and everyone was gutted. The guv'nor said that, after 33 years of training, he had never been so surprised by a result".

Despite his poor performance Mujahid contested the 2000 Guineas on 1 May and started the 9/1 fifth choice in the betting behind Orpen, Enrique, Auction House and Commander Collins. As the Rowley Mile course was being redeveloped the race was run on the July, or Summer course. After tracking the leaders in the early stages he moved up to dispute the lead two furlongs out and kept on at the same pace to finish third behind Island Sands and Enrique. Two weeks later the colt was sent to France for the Poule d'Essai des Poulains over 1600 metres at Longchamp Racecourse and finished fifth behind Sendawar. In the St James's Palace Stakes at Royal Ascot in June the colt finished seventh behind Sendawar, who won by one and a quarter lengths from Aljabr.

After a break of over four months, Mujahid returned in the Group Two Challenge Stakes over seven furlongs at Newmarket on 16 October and finished fourth behind Susu, Lend A Hand and Josr Algharoud. On his final appearance of the season Mujahid contested the James Seymour Stakes over ten furlongs at Newmarket and finished second by a length to Little Rock.

=== 2000: four-year-old season ===
Mujahid remained in training as a four-year-old, beginning his third season in the Earl of Sefton Stakes over nine furlongs at Newmarket on 19 April. He finished third of the eleven runners behind Indian Lodge and Fairy Godmother. Nine days later Mujahid was brought back in distance for the Sandown Mile and finished fifth behind Indian Lodge.

== Assessment ==
In the official International Classification on European two-year-old Mujahid was rated the best juvenile of 1998, one pound ahead of Lujain and four pounds ahead of the Cartier Champion Two-year-old Colt Aljabr.

== Stud record ==
Mujahid stood as a breeding stallion at the Beech House stud in England and was also "shuttled" to stand at the Widden Stud in Australia. He was later exported to Italy. The best of his offspring included Danleigh (Manikato Stakes, George Ryder Stakes, All Aged Stakes, Chipping Norton Stakes), Balius (Jebel Hatta), Tashelka (Prix de la Nonette), Cheyenne Star (Ridgewood Pearl Stakes), Khyber Kim (Aintree Hurdle), Mind Your Head (Rubiton Stakes), Baddam (Queen Alexandra Stakes), Cleo Fan (Premio Presidente della Repubblica) and Starlarks (San Clemente Handicap). Mujahid died at the Allevamento di Besnate stud in Italy in March 2026 at the age of 30. A representative of the stud described Mujahid as "always aggressive, eager to cover a mare or to eat a tonne of hay. He was the same every day, until his last one. He was our friend."

== Pedigree ==
Pedigree of Mujahid (USA), bay stallion, 1996
Sire Danzig (USA) 1977	Northern Dancer (CAN); 1961	Nearctic	Nearco
Sire Danzig (USA) 1977	Northern Dancer (CAN); 1961	Nearctic	Lady Angela
Sire Danzig (USA) 1977	Northern Dancer (CAN); 1961	Natalma	Native Dancer
Sire Danzig (USA) 1977	Northern Dancer (CAN); 1961	Natalma	Almahmoud
Sire Danzig (USA) 1977	Pas de Nom (USA); 1968	Admiral's Voyage	Crafty Admiral
Sire Danzig (USA) 1977	Pas de Nom (USA); 1968	Admiral's Voyage	Olympia Lou
Sire Danzig (USA) 1977	Pas de Nom (USA); 1968	Petitioner	Petition
Sire Danzig (USA) 1977	Pas de Nom (USA); 1968	Petitioner	Steady Aim
Dam Elrafa Ah (USA) 1991	Storm Cat (USA); 1983	Storm Bird	Northern Dancer
Dam Elrafa Ah (USA) 1991	Storm Cat (USA); 1983	Storm Bird	South Ocean
Dam Elrafa Ah (USA) 1991	Storm Cat (USA); 1983	Terlingua	Secretariat
Dam Elrafa Ah (USA) 1991	Storm Cat (USA); 1983	Terlingua	Crimson Saint
Dam Elrafa Ah (USA) 1991	Bubbles Darlene (USA); 1986	Fappiano	Mr. Prospector
Dam Elrafa Ah (USA) 1991	Bubbles Darlene (USA); 1986	Fappiano	Killaloe
Dam Elrafa Ah (USA) 1991	Bubbles Darlene (USA); 1986	Moment's Prayer	For The Moment
Dam Elrafa Ah (USA) 1991	Bubbles Darlene (USA); 1986	Moment's Prayer	Prayer Cap (Family: 9-b)

- Mujahid was inbred 2 × 4 to Northern Dancer, meaning that this stallion appears in both the second and the fourth generations of his pedigree.
