= Pharaoh's Delight =

Irish-bred Thoroughbred racehorse (1987–2015)

- Sire: Fairy King
- Grandsire: Northern Dancer
- Dam: Ridge the Times
- Damsire: Riva Ridge
- Sex: Mare
- Foaled: 2 April 1987
- Country: Ireland
- Colour: Bay
- Breeder: A Tarry
- Owner: Al-Deera Bloodstock Holdings Ltd
- Trainer: Peter Hudson; Dermot Weld
- Record: 19: 3-4-3
- Earnings: £216,323

Major wins
- Windsor Castle Stakes (1989); Princess Margaret Stakes (1989); Phoenix Stakes (1989)

Pharaoh's Delight (2 April 1987 – 2015) was an Irish-bred Thoroughbred racehorse and broodmare. She was one of the best two-year-old fillies in Europe in 1989 when she won the Windsor Castle Stakes, Princess Margaret Stakes and Phoenix Stakes as well as finishing second in the Moyglare Stud Stakes. Although she never won again the filly raced until the age of four and was placed in several top-class sprint races including the Nunthorpe Stakes, Haydock Sprint Cup and Prix de l'Abbaye. She was retired from racing at the end of the 1991 season and had some success as a dam of winners.

== Background ==
Pharaoh's Delight was a bay mare bred in Ireland by A Tarry. During her racing career she was owned by Al-Deera Bloodstock. She was initially sent into training with Peter Hudson in England.

Her sire Fairy King, who was full-brother to Sadler's Wells, failed to win a race after being injured on his debut, but sired the winners of over 500 races, including Helissio, Falbrav, Turtle Island, Oath and Encosta De Lago. Pharaoh's Delight's dam Ridge the Times showed some racing ability, winning a race at Hamilton Park Racecourse as a two-year-old in 1983. She was a granddaughter of the American broodmare Take A Stand whose other descendants have included Open Mind and Peaks and Valleys.

== Racing career ==
=== 1989: two-year-old season ===
Pharaoh's Delight made her first appearance in a maiden race over six furlongs at Leicester Racecourse on 10 June in which he started the 100/30 second favourite but came home sixth of the nine runners behind Bright Flower. Less than two weeks after he defeat at Leicester the filly was sent to Royal Ascot and dropped in distance to contest the five furlong Windsor Castle Stakes in which she was ridden as on her debut by Pat Eddery. Starting at odds of 11/2 she went to the front before half way and drew right away from her nine rivals to win by six lengths. A month later the filly returned to Ascot and moved up in class for the Group 3 Princess Margaret Stakes. With Eddery again in the saddle, she started the 7/4 favourite against five opponents including Palace Street (third in the Cherry Hinton Stakes). Pharaoh's Delight took the lead from the start and won "comfortably" by one and a half lengths from Routilante.

Ray Cochrane took the ride when Pharaoh's Delight was stepped up to Group 1 level for the Phoenix Stakes at Phoenix Park Racecourse on 13 August. She was made the 2/1 favourite ahead of the Vincent O'Brien-trained Wedding Bouquet while the other eight runners included Princess Taufan (National Stakes), Red Henry (runner-up in the Molecomb Stakes), Aminata (Curragh Stakes) and Duck And Dive (Chesterfield Stakes). Racing on softer ground than she had previously encountered Pharaoh's Delight won by a length from Duck And Dive with Wedding Bouquet a length away in third place. In September the filly was sent back to Ireland and started favourite for the Moyglare Stud Stakes at the Curragh but proved no match for the Henry Cecil-trained Chimes of Freedom and was beaten six lengths into second place,

=== 1990: three-year-old season ===
Pharaoh's Delight began her second season with two races over one mile/ 1600 metres. She finished sixth to Houseproud in the Poule d'Essai des Pouliches at Longchamp Racecourse in May and fifth to Chimes of Freedom in the Coronation Stakes at Royal Ascot a month later. A switch to sprinting brought no initial improvement as he came home eighth of the nine runners behind Royal Academy in the July Cup. Better was to follow in August as she finished second to Pole Position in the Prix de Meautry and then ran third to the year's leading sprinter Dayjur in the Nunthorpe Stakes at York. In September she finished third behind Dayjur and Royal Academy in the Haydock Sprint Cup but then ran disappointingly when she was the beaten favourite in a minor race at Newbury, and a distant fifth behind the French-trained colt Ron's Victory in the Diadem Stakes. On her final appearance of the season Pharaoh's Delight returned to her best form as she finished third to Dayjur in the Prix de l'Abbaye at Longchamp Racecourse on 7 October.

=== 1991: four-year-old season ===
For the 1991 season Pharaoh's Delight was transferred to Ireland and entered the stable of Dermot Weld. She began her campaign by running fourth in the Greenlands Stakes on 14 May but then lost her form and finished unplaced in the Ballyogan Stakes in June and two handicap races in August. On her final racecourse appearance she finished second to Wild Jester when favourite for a minor race at the Curragh in September.

== Breeding record ==
After her retirement from racing, Pharaoh's Delight became a broodmare for the Ballylinch Stud. She produced fourteen foals and at least seven winners.

- Matikanehanafubuki, a bay filly, foaled in 1993, sired by Caerleon. Failed to win in eight races in Japan.
- Machikane Emmusubi, bay filly, 1994, by Caerleon. Won four races in Japan.
- Pharmacist, bay filly, 1996, by Machiavellian. Won Rochestown Stakes: dam of Red Rocks.
- Mutamarkiz, bay colt, 1997, by Rainbow Quest. Won one race.
- Conspirator chestnut, colt, 1998, by Machiavellian. Won at least one race.
- Phariseek, bay filly, 1999, by Rainbow Quest. Won one race: dam of the Champion Four Year Old Hurdle winner Hisaabaat.
- Pyramid Painter, bay filly, 2000, Peintre Celebre. Unraced.
- Hadji Bey, bay filly, 2002, Darshaan. Unraced.
- Officer Krupke, chestnut colt (gelded), 2003, by Daylami. Won one National Hunt race.
- Dookus, grey filly, 2005, by Linamix. Failed to win in two races. Dam of US Law (Prix Thomas Bryon) and Frankuus (Rose of Lancaster Stakes)
- La Pinta, bay filly, 2006, by Bachelor Duke. Failed to win in four races.
- Days of Summer, bay filly, 2008, Bachelor Duke. Won one race.
- T Bag, bay colt (gelded), 2009, by Bachelor Duke. Raced in Norway.
- Pharadelle, chestnut filly, 2012, by Lope de Vega. Failed to win in five races.

== Pedigree ==
Pedigree of Pharaoh's Delight (IRE), bay mare, 1987
Sire Fairy King (USA) 1982	Northern Dancer (CAN); 1961	Nearctic	Nearco
Sire Fairy King (USA) 1982	Northern Dancer (CAN); 1961	Nearctic	Lady Angela
Sire Fairy King (USA) 1982	Northern Dancer (CAN); 1961	Natalma	Native Dancer
Sire Fairy King (USA) 1982	Northern Dancer (CAN); 1961	Natalma	Almahmoud
Sire Fairy King (USA) 1982	Fairy Bridge (USA); 1975	Bold Reason	Hail To Reason
Sire Fairy King (USA) 1982	Fairy Bridge (USA); 1975	Bold Reason	Lalun
Sire Fairy King (USA) 1982	Fairy Bridge (USA); 1975	Special	Forli
Sire Fairy King (USA) 1982	Fairy Bridge (USA); 1975	Special	Thong
Dam Ridge the Times (USA) 1981	Riva Ridge (USA); 1969	First Landing	Turn-To
Dam Ridge the Times (USA) 1981	Riva Ridge (USA); 1969	First Landing	Hildene
Dam Ridge the Times (USA) 1981	Riva Ridge (USA); 1969	Iberia	Heliopolis
Dam Ridge the Times (USA) 1981	Riva Ridge (USA); 1969	Iberia	War East
Dam Ridge the Times (USA) 1981	Oath of Allegiance (USA); 1975	Olden Times	Relic
Dam Ridge the Times (USA) 1981	Oath of Allegiance (USA); 1975	Olden Times	Djenne
Dam Ridge the Times (USA) 1981	Oath of Allegiance (USA); 1975	Take A Stand	Amerigo
Dam Ridge the Times (USA) 1981	Oath of Allegiance (USA); 1975	Take A Stand	Self Control (Family: A29)
