= Beckett (horse) =

Irish-bred Thoroughbred racehorse

- Sire: Fairy King
- Grandsire: Northern Dancer
- Dam: Groom Order
- Damsire: Groom Dancer
- Sex: Stallion
- Foaled: 19 March 1998
- Country: Ireland
- Colour: Bay
- Breeder: Ballygallon Stud
- Owner: Susan Magnier & Michael Tabor
- Trainer: Aidan O'Brien
- Record: 6: 3-1-1
- Earnings: £125,351

Major wins
- National Stakes (2000); Joel Stakes (2001)

Beckett (19 March 1998 – 1 August 2016) was an Irish Thoroughbred racehorse and sire. Sold as a yearling for 1.7 million guineas he showed very good form as a two-year-old in 2000 when he won two of his three races including the Group 1 National Stakes. He was sidelined for a year by injury, but returned in the autumn of 2001 to take a strong edition of the Joel Stakes. He was retired at the end of the year to become a breeding stallion and stood in Ireland and Australia but made little impact as a sire of winners.

== Background ==
Beckett was a bay horse with no white markings bred in Ireland by the County Kilkenny-based Ballygallon Stud. As a yearling in September 1999 the colt was consigned to the Tattersalls Houghton sale where he was bought for 1.7 million guineas by Dermot "Demi" O'Byrne acting on behalf of John Magnier's Coolmore Stud organisation. He was sent into training with Aidan O'Brien at Ballydoyle. During his track career he was officially owned in partnership by Magnier's wife Susan and Michael Tabor.

His sire Fairy King, who was full-brother to Sadler's Wells, failed to win a race after being injured on his debut, but sired the winners of over 500 races, including Helissio, Falbrav, Turtle Island, Oath and Encosta De Lago. Beckett's dam Groom Order wan unraced but came from a good family, being closely related to Exclusive and Entrepreneur.

== Racing career ==
=== 2000: two-year-old season ===
On 14 June Beckett began his racing career in a maiden race over six furlongs at Leopardstown Racecourse in which he started the 2/5 favourite and won "comfortably" by one and a half lengths from America Calling after leading from the start. The colt was moved up in class for the Group 3 Futurity Stakes over seven furlongs at the Curragh in August in which he was made the 6/1 fourth choice in the betting in a seven-runner field headed by his more fancied stablemate Bonnard. Ridden by Seamie Heffernan, he tracked the leaders before taking the lead a furlong out but was overtaken in the final tride and finished third, beate half a length and a short head by Lady Lahar and Bonnard.

On 17 September the colt was ridden by Heffernan again when he stepped up to Group 1 level for the National Stakes on yielding ground over the same course and distance. His stablemate Darwin started the 4/9 favourite ahead of Down To The Woods and Bonnard with Beckett next in the betting on 10/1. The other five runners included King's County (yet another O'Brien trainee), Berlin (third in the Anglesey Stakes) and the Dermot Weld-trained Elbader. Heffernan positioned the colt just behind the leaders as Down To The Woods set the early pace from King's County, but began to make progress two furlongs from the finish. Beckett went to the front approaching the final furlong and drew away in the closing stages to win by three lengths from King's County with the outsider March King staying on to take third. After the race Aidan O'Brien said "I think Beckett is a potential 2,000 Guineas horse. He's a lovely mover but he was able to handle the ground this time. He's got a great pedigree... You can't beat blood", while Heffernan commented "Beckett loved the ground. He relaxed very well for me and then picked up nicely when I said go".

=== 2001: three-year-old season ===
Training problems kept Beckett off the racecourse for the spring and summer of 2001. After an absence of a year he returned in the Listed Solonaway Stakes over one mile at the Curragh on 15 September. Starting the 7/4 favourite he took the lead approaching the last quarter mile but was overtaken inside the final furlong and beaten a head by Magic Cove. On 4 October the colt was sent to England and was made 3/1 favourite for the Joel Stakes at Newmarket Racecourse where his opponents included Malhub, Swallow Flight (Royal Windsor Stakes), Priors Lodge (City of York Stakes) and Lincoln Dancer (Sandy Lane Stakes). Ridden by Mick Kinane, he took the lead from the start and was ever headed, staying on well in the closing stages to win by three quarters of a length from Priors Lodge. Aidan O'Brien commented "the plan was to come here and then return for the Champion Stakes. That remains the same. He gets a mile really well and I think a lot of him". Sixteen days later at the same track, Beckett returned to Group 1 level for the Champion Stakes, as O'Brien had predicted. He led for the first seven furlongs before dropping out of contention and finishing tenth of the twelve runners in a race won by Nayef.

== Stud record ==
At the end of his racing career, Beckett was retired to become a breeding stallion in Ireland. In 2004 he was relocated to Independent Stallions Victoria near Echuca in Australia. He sired numerous minor winners both on the flat and over jumps but no top-class performers. Pensioned from stud duties in 2008. Died on 1 August 2016.

== Pedigree ==
Pedigree of Beckett (IRE), bay stallion, 1998
Sire Fairy King (USA) 1982	Northern Dancer (CAN); 1961	Nearctic	Nearco
Sire Fairy King (USA) 1982	Northern Dancer (CAN); 1961	Nearctic	Lady Angela
Sire Fairy King (USA) 1982	Northern Dancer (CAN); 1961	Natalma	Native Dancer
Sire Fairy King (USA) 1982	Northern Dancer (CAN); 1961	Natalma	Almahmoud
Sire Fairy King (USA) 1982	Fairy Bridge (USA); 1975	Bold Reason	Hail To Reason
Sire Fairy King (USA) 1982	Fairy Bridge (USA); 1975	Bold Reason	Lalun
Sire Fairy King (USA) 1982	Fairy Bridge (USA); 1975	Special	Forli
Sire Fairy King (USA) 1982	Fairy Bridge (USA); 1975	Special	Thong
Dam Groom Order (GB) 1993	Groom Dancer (USA); 1984	Blushing Groom	Red God
Dam Groom Order (GB) 1993	Groom Dancer (USA); 1984	Blushing Groom	Runaway Bride
Dam Groom Order (GB) 1993	Groom Dancer (USA); 1984	Featherhill	Lyphard
Dam Groom Order (GB) 1993	Groom Dancer (USA); 1984	Featherhill	Lady Berry
Dam Groom Order (GB) 1993	American Order (USA); 1987	Slew o' Gold	Seattle Slew
Dam Groom Order (GB) 1993	American Order (USA); 1987	Slew o' Gold	Alluvial
Dam Groom Order (GB) 1993	American Order (USA); 1987	Exclusive Order	Exclusive Native
Dam Groom Order (GB) 1993	American Order (USA); 1987	Exclusive Order	Bonavista (Family: 6-e)
