= Henry S. Clark Stakes top three finishers and starters =

This is a listing of the horses that finished in either first, second, or third place and the number of starters in the Henry S. Clark Stakes, an American stakes race for horses three years old and older at one mile on the turf held at Pimlico Race Course in Baltimore, Maryland.

Year	Winner	Second	Third	Starters
2019	Irish Strait	Real story	O' Dionysus	7
2018	Caribou Club	Doctor Mounty	Phlash Phelps	14
2017	Ascend	Synchrony	Ghost Hunter	13
2016	Rose Brier	Golden Sabre	Phlash Phelps	10
2015	Talk Show Man	Paris Vegas	Special Envoy	14
2014	Hamp	Roadhog	Nutello	11
2013	Eighttofasttocatch	Lubango	Concealed Identity	14
2012	Hudson Steele	Monument Hill	El Commodore	10
2011	Pocket Patch	Safety Valve	Lonely Whistle	8
2010	Baltimore Bob	Crimson Comic	Rockaby Bay	9
2009	Brickell	Independent George	Midwatch	11
2008	Stay Close	Forty Crowns	Headsandtales	9
2007	Stay Close	Midwatch	Broadway Producer	n/a
2006	Saint Stephen	Foufa's Warrior	Rubi Echo	n/a
2005	Gunning For	Package Store	Rubi Echo	n/a
2004	Mr. O'Brien	Spruce Run	Tam's Terms	n/a
2003	Tam's Terms	Glick	Run to Victory	n/a
2002	Mus-If	Great Woods	Banner Boy	n/a
2001	Private Slip	Inexplicable	Watchman's Warning	n/a

== See also ==
- Henry S. Clark Stakes
- Pimlico Race Course
- List of graded stakes at Pimlico Race Course
