= Sirmione (horse) =

Australian-bred Thoroughbred racehorse

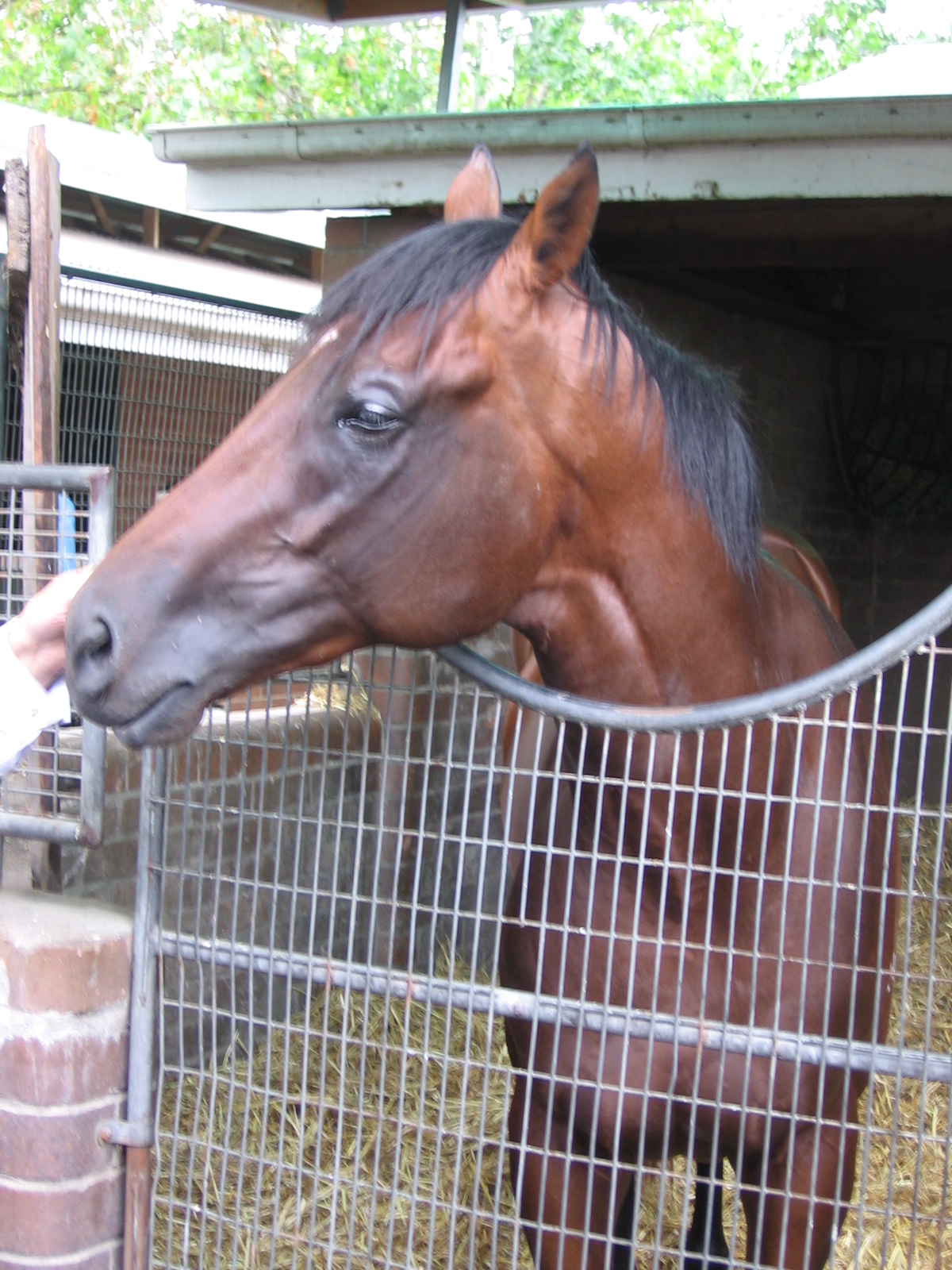
- Sirmione Sirmione
- Sire: Encosta De Lago
- Grandsire: Fairy King (USA)
- Dam: World Guide (NZ)
- Damsire: Defensive Play (USA)
- Sex: Gelding
- Foaled: 25 August 2003 (age 23)
- Country: Australia
- Colour: Bay
- Breeder: MF Doyle, Murrulla Stud, NSW
- Owner: J M & T M Xipell, R Covington & L A & S J Smith
- Trainer: Bart Cummings
- Record: 38-4-3-6
- Earnings: A$1,894,375

Major wins
- LKS Mackinnon Stakes (2007); QTC Grand Prix Stakes (2007); Australian Cup (2008)
- Last updated on 10 September 2010

Sirmione, foaled on 25 August 2003 in Australia, is notable for winning the LKS Mackinnon Stakes at 60-1 during the 2007 spring carnival.

He is a bay Thoroughbred gelding by the sire, Encosta De Lago from World Guide (NZ) by Defensive Play (USA) that was bred by M.F. Doyle, Murrulla Stud in New South Wales. World Guide is the dam of four named horses, but Sirmione is her only stakes-winner.

Sirmione was sold as a yearling at the Magic Millions sales on the Gold Coast for $300,000 to Bart Cummings. He is trained by the Cups King, Bart Cummings and raced by owners, J M & T M Xipell, R Covington & L A & S J Smith. On 3 November 2007 he recorded an upset victory in the Mackinnon Stakes, winning by 1.75 lengths from a field which included Haradasun, Zipping, Railings and Miss Finland.

He went on to run 12th in the Melbourne Cup. Following this he then went on to win the Australian Cup in March 2008 before running third in the BMW at Rosehill.

During his racing career he had 38 starts for 4 wins, 3 seconds and 6 thirds for stakes prizemoney of A$1,894,375 up until 9 September 2010.
