= 1999 Epsom Derby =

- Location: Epsom Downs Racecourse
- Date: 5 June 1999
- Winning horse: Oath
- Starting price: 13/2
- Jockey: Kieren Fallon
- Trainer: Henry Cecil
- Owner: The Thoroughbred Corp.

Epsom Derby 1999
1-2-3
Oath	Daliapour	Beat All

Also Ran
4-5-6
Housemaster	All The Way	Glamis
7-8-9
Saffron Walden	Compton Admiral	Dubai Millennium
10-11-12
Brancaster	Val Royal	Zaajer
13-14-15
Adair	Salford Express	Lucido
Through The Rye	16 Ran	2m 37.43s

The 1999 Epsom Derby was a horse race which took place at Epsom Downs on Saturday 5 June 1999. It was the 220th running of the Derby, and it was won by Oath. The winner was ridden by Kieren Fallon and trained by Henry Cecil. The pre-race favourite Dubai Millennium finished ninth.

== Race details ==
- Sponsor: Vodafone
- Winner's prize money: £611,450
- Going: Good (Good to Soft in places)
- Number of runners: 16
- Winner's time: 2m 37.43s

== Full result ==
	*	Horse	Jockey	Trainer ^{†}	SP
1		Oath	Kieren Fallon	Henry Cecil	13/2
2	1¾	Daliapour	Gérald Mossé	Luca Cumani	10/1
3	1½	Beat All	Gary Stevens	Sir Michael Stoute	7/1
4	shd	Housemaster	Willie Ryan	Michael Bell	12/1
5	1¼	All the Way	Johnny Murtagh	Terry Mills	33/1
6	nk	Glamis	Ray Cochrane	John Gosden	40/1
7	1¼	Saffron Walden	Michael Kinane	Aidan O'Brien (IRE)	8/1
8	1½	Compton Admiral	Thierry Jarnet	Gerard Butler	25/1
9	1½	Dubai Millennium	Frankie Dettori	Saeed bin Suroor	5/1 fav
10	3	Brancaster	Jimmy Fortune	Peter Chapple-Hyam	20/1
11	hd	Val Royal	Olivier Peslier	André Fabre (FR)	14/1
12	1¼	Zaajer	Richard Hills	Ed Dunlop	16/1
13	shd	Adair	Daragh O'Donohoe	Saeed bin Suroor	16/1
14	1¼	Salford Express	Pat Eddery	David Elsworth	12/1
15	9	Lucido	Richard Quinn	John Dunlop	13/2
16	1	Through the Rye	Michael Hills	Barry Hills	100/1

* The distances between the horses are shown in lengths or shorter. shd = short-head; hd = head; nk = neck.
† Trainers are based in Great Britain unless indicated.

== Winner's details ==
Further details of the winner, Oath:

- Foaled: 22 April 1996, in Ireland
- Sire: Fairy King; Dam: Sheer Audacity (Troy)
- Owner: The Thoroughbred Corp.
- Breeder: Mrs Max Morris
- Rating in 1999 International Classifications: 123

== Form analysis ==
=== Two-year-old races ===
Notable runs by the future Derby participants as two-year-olds in 1998.

- Daliapour – 3rd Haynes, Hanson and Clark Stakes, 1st Autumn Stakes
- Housemaster – 5th Chesham Stakes, 3rd Racing Post Trophy
- Glamis – 2nd Stardom Stakes, 2nd Royal Lodge Stakes, 3rd Grand Critérium
- Saffron Walden – 2nd Killavullan Stakes
- Compton Admiral – 2nd Chesham Stakes, 2nd Solario Stakes
- Brancaster – 1st Horris Hill Stakes
- Lucido – 3rd Preis des Winterfavoriten

=== The road to Epsom ===
Early-season appearances in 1999 and trial races prior to running in the Derby.

- Oath – 1st Dee Stakes
- Daliapour – 1st Blue Riband Trial Stakes, 2nd Lingfield Derby Trial
- Beat All – 1st Newmarket Stakes
- Housemaster – 3rd Feilden Stakes, 4th Chester Vase (disq from 1st)
- Glamis – 3rd Sandown Classic Trial, 7th Dante Stakes
- Saffron Walden – 1st Leopardstown 2,000 Guineas Trial Stakes, 1st Irish 2,000 Guineas
- Compton Admiral – 1st Craven Stakes, 13th 2,000 Guineas
- Dubai Millennium – 1st Predominate Stakes
- Brancaster – 2nd Craven Stakes, 4th 2,000 Guineas
- Val Royal – 1st Prix Matchem, 1st Prix de Guiche
- Zaajer – 1st Glasgow Stakes
- Salford Express – 1st Dante Stakes
- Lucido – 1st Lingfield Derby Trial
- Through the Rye – 4th Dee Stakes

=== Subsequent Group 1 wins ===
Group 1 / Grade I victories after running in the Derby.

- Daliapour – Coronation Cup (2000), Hong Kong Vase (2000)
- Housemaster – Hong Kong Champions & Chater Cup (2000)
- Compton Admiral – Eclipse Stakes (1999)
- Dubai Millennium – Prix Jacques Le Marois (1999), Queen Elizabeth II Stakes (1999), Dubai World Cup (2000), Prince of Wales's Stakes (2000)
- Val Royal – Breeders' Cup Mile (2001)

== Subsequent breeding careers ==
Leading progeny of participants in the 1999 Epsom Derby.

=== Sires of Classic winners ===
Dubai Millennium (9th)

- Dubawi - 1st Irish 2,000 Guineas (2005)
- Echo Of Light - 1st Prix Daniel Wildenstein (2006)
- Belenus - 1st Sovereign Stakes (2006)
- Oude - 3rd Champagne Stakes (2004)

Val Royal (11th)

- Cockney Rebel 1st 2000 Guineas Stakes, 1st Irish 2000 Guineas (2007)
- Soy Carambolo - 1st Gran Premio Carlos Pellegrini (2013)
- Slim Shadey - 2nd Turf Classic Stakes (2012)
- Harper Valley - 3rd Anniversary 4-Y-O Novices' Hurdle (2008)

=== Sires of National Hunt horses ===
Daliapour (2nd)

- Le Grande Dame - 2nd Prix Renaud du Vivier (2007)
- Aupcharlie - 2nd Fort Leney Novice Chase (2012)
- Zaliapour - Winner of three listed hurdle races in France
- Sun Zephyr - Winner of two listed hurdle races in France

Saffron Walden (7th) - Initially exported to Japan before standing in Ireland

- Moon Racer - 1st Champion Bumper (2015), 1st Sharp Novices' Hurdle (2016)

=== Other Stallions ===
Oath (1st) - Exported to Japan, exported to India - Love Caerna (3rd Yushun Himba 2007)
Beat All (3rd) - Gentleman Jon (1st Badger Ales Trophy 2016)
Compton Admiral (8th) - Beauchamp Xerxes (2nd Cocked Hat Stakes 2009)
Salford Express (14th) - Minor jumps winners
