= Saffron Walden (horse) =

French-bred Thoroughbred racehorse

- Sire: Sadler's Wells
- Grandsire: Northern Dancer
- Dam: Or Vision
- Damsire: Irish River
- Sex: Stallion
- Foaled: 5 March 1996
- Country: France
- Colour: Bay
- Breeder: Stavros Niarchos
- Owner: Niarchos Family; Susan Magnier
- Trainer: Aidan O'Brien
- Record: 8: 3-2-1
- Earnings: £132,175

Major wins
- 2000 Guineas Trial Stakes (1999); Irish 2000 Guineas (1999)

Saffron Walden (foaled 5 March 1996) was a French-bred, Irish-trained Thoroughbred racehorse and sire. Bred by Stavros Niarchos he fetched IR£1,200,000 as a yearling and showed considerable promise on his only run as a two-year-old when he finished second in the Killavullan Stakes. In the spring of 1999 he emerged as a top-class miler, winning the 2000 Guineas Trial Stakes before recording an emphatic victory in the Irish 2000 Guineas. He was fancied for The Derby but finished seventh and was disappointing in his two subsequent races. After being retired from racing he stood as a breeding stallion in Japan and Ireland with limited success as a sire of winners.

== Background ==
Saffron Walden was a bay horse with a small white star and a white coronet on his right hind foot bred in France by Stavros Niarchos. Niarchos died a month after the colt was foaled and the horse then entered the ownership of the Niarchos family. In October 1997 the yearling was offered for sale at Goffs and was bought for IR£1,200,000 by the Dermot "Demi" OByrne on behalf of John Magnier's Coolmore organisation. During his racecourse career he was owned by Susan Magnier and trained by Aidan O'Brien at Ballydoyle. He was ridden in all but two of his races by Mick Kinane. The horse's name was originally spelled Saffron Waldon but was later amended to match the name of the town in Essex. The error was believed to have occurred when a fax message was misread and was only corrected after the colt won the Irish 2000 Guineas.

He was from the eleventh crop of foals sired by Sadler's Wells, who won the Irish 2,000 Guineas, Eclipse Stakes and Irish Champion Stakes in 1984 went on to be the Champion sire on fourteen occasions. Saffron Walden's dam Or Vision was a high-class racemare who won the Prix Imprudence as a three-year-old in 1986, before being retired to become a very successful broodmare, producing several other good winners including Dolphin Street (Prix de la Forêt) and Insight (E. P. Taylor Stakes). She was a full-sister to Brigid, the dam Listen and Seqoyah and the grand-dam of Henrythenavigator.

== Racing career ==
=== 1998: two-year-old season ===
Instead of beginning his track career in a maiden race, Saffron Walden made his debut in the Group Three Killavullan Stakes over seven furlongs at Leopardstown Racecourse in October. He started the 2/1 favourite but despite staying on well in straight he was beaten one and a half lengths by the Jim Bolger-trained filly Athlumney Lady.

=== 1999: three-year-old season ===
On his three-year-old debut Saffron Walden started odds-on favourite for a maiden race over one mile at the Curragh on 28 March. Despite sweating up before the start he tracked the leaders before going to the front a furlong from the finish and won "easily" by a length from Carhue Gold. Three weeks later the colt contested the Listed 2000 Guineas Trial Stakes over the same distance at Leopardstown and started 8/11 favourite ahead of the National Stakes winner Mus-If. He turned into the straight in third place and produced a strong finish to catch Mus-If in the final strides and won by a head. Aidan O'Brien said "Michael was very happy with the horse today. He was educating him and didn't want to get to the bottom of him."

On 22 May he was one of ten colts to contest the Irish 2000 Guineas at the Curragh and with Mick Kinane opting to partner the O'Brien stable's more fancied runner Orpen (winner of the Prix Morny), the ride on Saffron Walden went to the French jockey Olivier Peslier. Island Sands and Enrique headed the betting on 2/1 and 5/2 respectively having finished first and second in the 2000 Guineas. Orpen was the third choice on 9/2 ahead of Access All Areas (Marble Hill Stakes) and Mus-If with Saffron Walden starting at odds of 12/1. He was restrained by Peslier in the early stages before moving into contention on the outside in the last quarter mile. He produce a "powerful run" to take the lead inside the final furlong and drew away from his opponents to win "easily" by three lengths from Enrique with Orpen taking third ahead of Mus-If. After the race O'Brien commented "He's a lovely horse and I think the Derby is next. We were worried about his stamina, being a half-brother to a very fast horse, and today was a bit of a test" while Pesler said Peslier "He was only getting going at the end, if there had been further to run, he would have won further."

On 5 June Saffron Walden started the 8/1 fifth choice in the betting for the 1999 Epsom Derby over one and a half miles at Epsom Racecourse. After being restrained at the rear of the field by Kinane he made some progress on the outside in the straight but never looked likely to win and finished seventh of the sixteen runners, six and a quarter lengths behind the winner Oath. Saffron Walden was then dropped in class and distance for the Group Three Meld Stakes over ten furlongs at the Curragh on 23 July in which he started 4/5 favourite but was beaten four lengths into second place by the four-year-old Make No Mistake. In August he was sent to England for the second time for the International Stakes at York Racecourse. He pulled hard in the early stages and faded badly in the straight, finishing tailed off last of the nine runners behind Royal Anthem.

=== 2000: four-year-old season ===
Saffron Walden was off the course for eleven months before returning for his first and only appearance as a four-year-old in the Minstrel Stakes over one mile at the Curragh on 16 July 2000. Ridden by Seamie Heffernan he finished third of the six runners behind the tree-year-old colt Shibi.

== Stud record ==
At the end of his racing career Saffron Walden was sold for an undisclosed sum and exported to become a breeding stallion in Japan. He returned to Ireland in 2005 and was based at the Rossenarra Stud in County Kilkenny where he has marketed as a National Hunt sire. The best of his offspring has been Moon Racer whose wins have included the Champion Bumper and Sharp Novices' Hurdle.

== Pedigree ==
Pedigree of Saffron Walden (FR), stallion, 1996
Sire Sadler's Wells (USA) 1981	Northern Dancer (CAN); 1961	Nearctic	Nearco
Sire Sadler's Wells (USA) 1981	Northern Dancer (CAN); 1961	Nearctic	Lady Angela
Sire Sadler's Wells (USA) 1981	Northern Dancer (CAN); 1961	Natalma	Native Dancer
Sire Sadler's Wells (USA) 1981	Northern Dancer (CAN); 1961	Natalma	Almahmoud
Sire Sadler's Wells (USA) 1981	Fairy Bridge (USA); 1975	Bold Reason	Hail To Reason
Sire Sadler's Wells (USA) 1981	Fairy Bridge (USA); 1975	Bold Reason	Lalun
Sire Sadler's Wells (USA) 1981	Fairy Bridge (USA); 1975	Special	Forli
Sire Sadler's Wells (USA) 1981	Fairy Bridge (USA); 1975	Special	Thong
Dam Or Vision (USA) 1983	Irish River (FR); 1966	Riverman	Never Bend
Dam Or Vision (USA) 1983	Irish River (FR); 1966	Riverman	River Lady
Dam Or Vision (USA) 1983	Irish River (FR); 1966	Irish Star	Klairon
Dam Or Vision (USA) 1983	Irish River (FR); 1966	Irish Star	Botany Bay
Dam Or Vision (USA) 1983	Luv Luvin (USA); 1977	Raise a Native	Native Dancer
Dam Or Vision (USA) 1983	Luv Luvin (USA); 1977	Raise a Native	Raise You
Dam Or Vision (USA) 1983	Luv Luvin (USA); 1977	Ringing Bells	Bold Lad
Dam Or Vision (USA) 1983	Luv Luvin (USA); 1977	Ringing Bells	Dryad (Family 9-b)
