= Lujain =

American-bred Thoroughbred racehorse

- Sire: Seeking the Gold
- Grandsire: Mr Prospector
- Dam: Satin Flower
- Damsire: Shadeed
- Sex: Stallion
- Foaled: 8 February 1996
- Country: United States
- Colour: Bay
- Breeder: Darley Stud
- Owner: Sheikh Mohammed; Godolphin
- Trainer: David Loder; Saeed bin Suroor
- Record: 6: 3-0-0
- Earnings: £82,249

Major wins
- Middle Park Stakes (1998)

Lujain (foaled 8 February 1996) was an American-bred, British-trained thoroughbred racehorse and sire. He showed his best form as a two-year-old in 1998 when he won his first three races by wide margins, culminating in a victory in the G1 Middle Park Stakes. He made no impact in three subsequent races and was retired to stud at the end of 1999. He had little success as a breeding stallion.

== Background ==
Lujain was a bay horse with no white markings bred in Kentucky by his owner, Sheikh Mohammed's Darley Stud. He was sired by Seeking the Gold who won the Super Derby, the Peter Pan Stakes, the Dwyer Stakes, and the Swale Stakes in 1988. He went on to become a very successful breeding stallion whose other progeny included Dubai Millennium, Flanders and Jazil. Lujain's dam Satin Flower was a high-class racemare whose wins included the Jersey Stakes in 1991 and went on to produce the 2005 UAE 1000 Guineas winner Satin Kiss. She was a great-great-granddaughter of Lea Lark, an American broodmare whose other descendants have included Tobougg, Miswaki, Almutawakel, Southern Halo, Peter Davies and White Muzzle

Sheikh Mohammed sent the colt into training with David Loder at Newmarket, Suffolk.

== Racing career ==
=== 1998: two-year-old career ===
Lujain began his racing career in a maiden race over six furlongs at Newmarket Racecourse on 18 July and started the 4/9 favourite in a nine-runner field. Ridden as in all his races that year by Frankie Dettori he took the lead approaching the final furlong and drew away to win by three and a half lengths from Indian Warrior. On 4 September the colt started odds-on favourite for a minor race at York Racecourse and won "very easily" by five lengths from Trinity.

On 1 October Lujain was stepped up in class for the Group One Middle Park Stakes and was made the 8/11 favourite against six opponents. His opponents included Sheer Viking and the Irish challenger Borromini who had finished first and second in the Flying Childers Stakes. The other runners were Bertolini (July Stakes)m Sailing Shoes (runner-up in the Gimcrack Stakes), Belasco (third in the Mill Reef Stakes) and the John Dunlop-trained Vision of Night. Dettori restrained the colt in the early stages before making progress down the centre of the course and taking the lead approaching the final furlong. He accelerated clear of his rivals and won by four lengths from Bertolini despite edging to the right in the closing stages. After the race Dettori said "All of a sudden he just zoomed by them, it was amazing. He's very willing, not lethargic at all. He's the perfect horse" whilst Loder commented "He's just a superb horse. He's a machine, isn't he? He hasn't been tested yet" before stating his confidence in the colt's ability to stay further.

Two weeks later, Lujain attempted to complete a rare double when he moved up to seven furlongs for the Dewhurst Stakes and started the 9/2 third favourite behind Stravinsky and the Somerville Tattersall Stakes winner Enrique. He chased the leaders before weakening abruptly in the last quarter mile and finished tailed off in sixth place, more than twenty-two lengths behind the upset winner Mujahid. At the end of 1998 Lujain was transferred to Sheikh Mohammed's Godolphin organisation, with Saeed bin Suroor taking over from Loder as his trainer.

=== 1999: three-year-old career ===
In 1999 Lujain was campaigned over sprint distances, beginning his season in the six furlong Duke of York Stakes at York Racecourse in May. Ridden by Mick Kinane, he briefly took the lead a furlong out before fading into fifth place behind Sampower Star. The colt was reunited with Dettori for the King's Stand Stakes over five furlongs at Royal Ascot on 18 June. Lujain appeared to recover well from a poor start but weakened in the final furlong and finished twelfth of the seventeen runners.

== Stud record ==
Lujain was retired from racing to become a breeding stallion at his owner's Dalham Hall stud and was also shuttled to stand in Australia. In 2006 he was exported to stand at the Elia Stud in Greece where his last reported foals were born in 2011. His most successful offspring were Mixed Blessing (Princess Margaret Stakes), Ghetto Blaster, a Group 2 winner in Australia, and Stop Making Sense who won the Listed Prix du Haras de la Huderie and finished second in the Prix La Rochette in 2004.

== Pedigree ==
Pedigree of Lujain (USA), bay stallion, 1996
Sire Seeking The Gold (USA) 1985	Mr. Prospector (USA); 1970	Raise a Native	Native Dancer
Sire Seeking The Gold (USA) 1985	Mr. Prospector (USA); 1970	Raise a Native	Raise You
Sire Seeking The Gold (USA) 1985	Mr. Prospector (USA); 1970	Gold Digger	Nashua
Sire Seeking The Gold (USA) 1985	Mr. Prospector (USA); 1970	Gold Digger	Sequence
Sire Seeking The Gold (USA) 1985	Con Game (USA); 1974	Buckpasser	Tom Fool
Sire Seeking The Gold (USA) 1985	Con Game (USA); 1974	Buckpasser	Busanda
Sire Seeking The Gold (USA) 1985	Con Game (USA); 1974	Broadway	Hasty Road
Sire Seeking The Gold (USA) 1985	Con Game (USA); 1974	Broadway	Flitabout
Dam Satin Flower (USA) 1988	Shadeed (USA); 1982	Nijinsky	Northern Dancer
Dam Satin Flower (USA) 1988	Shadeed (USA); 1982	Nijinsky	Flaming Page
Dam Satin Flower (USA) 1988	Shadeed (USA); 1982	Continual	Damascus
Dam Satin Flower (USA) 1988	Shadeed (USA); 1982	Continual	Continuation
Dam Satin Flower (USA) 1988	Sateen (USA); 1976	Round Table	Princequillo
Dam Satin Flower (USA) 1988	Sateen (USA); 1976	Round Table	Knight's Daughter
Dam Satin Flower (USA) 1988	Sateen (USA); 1976	Satin	Forli
Dam Satin Flower (USA) 1988	Sateen (USA); 1976	Satin	Lea Moon (Family: 16-g)
