= Mus-If =

British-bred Thoroughbred racehorse

- Sire: Lahib
- Grandsire: Riverman
- Dam: Navajo Love Song
- Damsire: Dancing Brave
- Sex: Gelding
- Foaled: 2 February 1996
- Country: United Kingdom
- Colour: Bay
- Breeder: Eurostrait Ltd
- Owner: Hamdan Al-Maktoum
- Trainer: Dermot Weld; Neil Drysdale; Michael V. Pino
- Record: 23: 7-7-2
- Earnings: $429,173

Major wins
- National Stakes (1998); Henry S. Clark Stakes (2002); C. Edmund O'Brien Stakes (2002)

Mus-If (foaled 2 February 1996) was a British-bred Thoroughbred racehorse. Originally trained in Ireland, he was a top-class performer as a juvenile in 1998 when he finished second in both the Tyros Stakes and the Futurity Stakes before recording his biggest win in the Group 1 National Stakes. After failing to win as a three-year-old he was sent to the United States and gelded. Returning to the track in 2001 he made little impact in two starts but did much better in the following year when he won five races including the Henry S. Clark Stakes and C. Edmund O'Brien Stakes.

== Background ==
Mus-If was a bay horse bred in the United Kingdom by Eurostrait Ltd. As a yearling he was consigned to the sales at Deauville in August 1997 and was bought for ₣350,000 by Hamdan Al-Maktoum's Shadwell Estate company. The colt was sent to Ireland and entered training with Dermot Weld.

He was one of the best horses sired by Lahib who won the Queen Anne Stakes and the Queen Elizabeth II Stakes in 1991. Lahib's other progeny included Super Tassa, Vicious Circle (Ebor Handicap), Last Resort (Challenge Stakes) and Late Night Out (Supreme Stakes). Mus-If's dam Navajo Love Song showed little racing ability, failing to win in seven starts. She was, however, a descendant of the French broodmare Moira (foaled 1959) who was the female-line ancestor of Dancing Maid.

== Racing career ==
=== 1998: two-year-old season ===
Mus-If made his racecourse debut in a maiden race over six furlongs at Leopardstown Racecourse on 18 June in which he started at odds of 7/2 and finished second by a neck to Fable after leading for most of the way. Eighteen days late he recorded his first success in a maiden over seven furlongs at the Curragh. Ridden by Mick Kinane and starting the 6/4 favourite, he took the lead three furlongs out and kept on well in the closing stages to win by a head from Globe Theatre. The colt was moved up in class for the Listed Tyros Stakes over the same course and distance on 15 August for which he started favourite but was beaten into second place by the Jim Bolger-trained filly Arctic Blue. He found another Bolger filly, St Clair Ridge, too good for him in the Group 3 Futurity Stakes two weeks later and was beaten a length and a half into second place.

In the Group 1 National Stakes over seven furlongs at the Curragh on 20 September Mus-If, with Kinane in the saddle started the 8/1 third choice in the betting behind the Acomb Stakes runner-up Coliseum and Globe Theatre. None of the other six runners had contested a Group race, making the field appear to be a poor one by Group 1 standards. The best horse in the race was probably the British-trained Royal Rebel, who later won two editions of the Ascot Gold Cup. Wearing blinkers, Mus-If went to the front from the start, opened up a clear advantage approaching the last quarter mile and held off the late challenge of Coliseum to win by a neck.

=== 1999: three-year-old season ===
Mus-if began his second season in the Listed 2000 Guineas Trial Stakes over one mile at Leopardstown on 18 April. He took the lead in the straight but was caught in the final strides and was beaten a head by the Aidan O'Brien-trained favourite Saffron Walden. In the Irish 2000 Guineas five week later at the Curragh he went to the front two furlongs out but was overtaken entering the final furlong and came home fourth behind Saffron Walden, Enrique and Orpen with the 2000 Guineas winner Island Sands in fifth. The colt was the dropped in class for the International Stakes over nine furlongs at the Curragh in June but finished last of the five runners behind the Henry Cecil-trained favourite Great Dane. On his final European start, Mus-If was sent to Germany to contest the Group 2 Grosse Europcar-Meile at Cologne-Weidenpesch Racecourse on 25 September. He was made the 3/5 favourite but came home fourth behind the four-year-old El Divino.

=== 2001: five-year-old season ===
At the end of his European racing career Mus-If was sent to the United States where he was "mistakenly" gelded. He re-entered training in 2001 and joined the stable of Neil Drysdale in California. He raced twice at Santa Anita Park, finishing second in a claiming race in February and fourth in a similar event in March.

=== 2002: six-year-old season ===
In 2002 Mus-If moved to the training stable of Michael Pino and began his campaign in claiming races at Fair Grounds Race Course. After finishing fourth and third on his first two starts he recorded his first success for three and a half years when taking a claimer on 11 March. After winning a similar event at Keeneland Racecourse in April he was stepped up in class to contest the Henry S. Clark Stakes over one mile at Pimlico Race Course on 4 May. Starting favourite against ten opponents he took the lead in the stretch and won by five lengths under a "hand ride" from his trainer's brother Mario Pino. Three weeks later at the same track, Mus-If extended his winning sequence to four in the C. Edmund O'Brien Stakes. With Mario Pino again in the saddle he started at long odds-on and came home two lengths clear of Cynics Beware after taking the lead on the home turn. His victory was only confirmed after a lengthy inquiry by the racecourse stewards into possible interference caused by Mus-If to one of his rivals on the far turn. The gelding's winning streak came to an end in June when he was beaten into second place by Del Mar Show in the Grade III New Hampshire Sweepstakes Handicap at Rockingham Park.

In the late summer and autumn of 2002 Mus-If was campaigned at Delaware Park Racetrack where he finished sixth in the Sussex Handicap and third in the Leader of the Band Stakes before winning a claiming race on 6 October. On his last two starts he finished second in a claiming race at Churchill Downs in November and seventh in a similar event at Fair Grounds on 8 December.

== Pedigree ==
Pedigree of Mus-If (GB), bay gelding, 1996
Sire Lahib (USA) 1988	Riverman (USA); 1969	Never Bend	Nasrullah
Sire Lahib (USA) 1988	Riverman (USA); 1969	Never Bend	Lalun
Sire Lahib (USA) 1988	Riverman (USA); 1969	River Lady	Prince John
Sire Lahib (USA) 1988	Riverman (USA); 1969	River Lady	Nile Lily
Sire Lahib (USA) 1988	Lady Cutlass (USA); 1978	Cutlass	Damascus
Sire Lahib (USA) 1988	Lady Cutlass (USA); 1978	Cutlass	Aphonia
Sire Lahib (USA) 1988	Lady Cutlass (USA); 1978	General's Sister	Count Fleet
Sire Lahib (USA) 1988	Lady Cutlass (USA); 1978	General's Sister	Cigar Maid
Dam Navajo Love Song (IRE) 1990	Dancing Brave (USA); 1983	Lyphard	Northern Dancer
Dam Navajo Love Song (IRE) 1990	Dancing Brave (USA); 1983	Lyphard	Goofed
Dam Navajo Love Song (IRE) 1990	Dancing Brave (USA); 1983	Navajo Princess	Drone
Dam Navajo Love Song (IRE) 1990	Dancing Brave (USA); 1983	Navajo Princess	Olmec
Dam Navajo Love Song (IRE) 1990	Marquina (FR); 1982	Posse	Forli
Dam Navajo Love Song (IRE) 1990	Marquina (FR); 1982	Posse	Restless Wind
Dam Navajo Love Song (IRE) 1990	Marquina (FR); 1982	Moquerie	Beaugency
Dam Navajo Love Song (IRE) 1990	Marquina (FR); 1982	Moquerie	Moqueuse (Family: 14-b)
