= Seeking The Gold =

American-bred Thoroughbred racehorse

- Sire: Mr. Prospector
- Grandsire: Raise A Native
- Dam: Con Game
- Damsire: Buckpasser
- Sex: Stallion
- Foaled: April 7, 1985
- Died: July 28, 2016 (aged 31)
- Country: United States
- Colour: Bay
- Breeder: Ogden Phipps
- Owner: Ogden Phipps
- Trainer: Shug McGaughey
- Record: 15: 8-6-0
- Earnings: $2,307,000

Major wins
- Super Derby (1988); Peter Pan Stakes (1988); Dwyer Stakes (1988); Swale Stakes (1988)
- Last updated on June 14, 2017

Seeking The Gold (April 7, 1985 – July 28, 2016) was an American thoroughbred racehorse and a successful sire.

== Background and Family ==
Seeking The Gold, a bay colt, was bred in Kentucky by Ogden Phipps, who also owned him. One of numerous top class runners sired by Mr. Prospector, Seeking The Gold was out of the Buckpasser mare Con Game, who also produced Remsen Stakes winner Fast Play and the Jamaica Handicap winner Stacked Pack.

== Racing career ==
Seeking The Gold ran only once as a juvenile, making his debut race in late December 1987 a winning one.

Seeking The Gold showed his best form as a three-year-old in 1988. He won the Super Derby, Peter Pan Stakes, Dwyer Stakes, and Swale Stakes, a race in which he went into undefeated.

He was narrowly beaten by Forty Niner in both the Haskell Invitational Stakes and the Travers Stakes, then also finished second again to Alysheba in the 1988 Breeder's Cup Classic, all with jockey Pat Day aboard coming with late runs and fast finishes for the runner-up placings. He was also second in both the Gotham Stakes and Wood Memorial Stakes to Private Terms earlier in the year.

Seeking The Gold ran twice as an older horse, winning an allowance at Belmont Park in May 1989, and finishing second nine days later in the Metropolitan Handicap behind Proper Reality.

== Stud record ==
=== As a Sire ===
Seeking The Gold was pensioned in November 2008 after standing stud at Claiborne Farm for a fee that was as high as US$250,000 before being lowered to US$125,000 (live foal) in 2005. In 19 crops of foals, Seeking The Gold sired at least 91 stakes winners, of which 18 were G1 winners and 5 were champions. His progeny include:

- Heavenly Prize (US) M, 1991 – won eight G1 races, American Champion Three-Year-Old Filly (1994)
- Flanders (US) M, 1992 – won the Breeders' Cup Juvenile Fillies (1994), American Champion Two-Year-Old Filly (1994)
- Seeking The Pearl (US) M, 1994 – the first Japan-based horse to win a G1 race in Europe, career earnings of US$4,021,716. Champion Older Female in France.
- Dubai Millennium (GB) H, 1996 – won four G1 races, career earnings of US$4,470,404, also notably the sire of Dubawi.
- Lujain (US) H, 1996 – won the Middle Park Stakes (1998)
- Cash Run (US) M, 1997 – won the Breeders' Cup Juvenile Fillies (1999)
- Catch The Ring (CAN) M, 1997 – Canadian Champion Three-Year-Old Filly (2000)
- Pleasant Home (US) M, 2001 – won the Breeders' Cup Distaff (2005)
- Wanderin Boy (US) H, 2001 – multiple G2 & G3 stakes winner, and a runner-up in the then G1 Pimlico Special (2006)
- Bob And John (US) H, 2003 – won the Wood Memorial Stakes (2006)
- Jazil (US) H, 2003 – won the Belmont Stakes (2006)
- Cape Town (US) H, 1995 – three time graded stakes winner, including the Florida Derby.

Seeking The Gold was crowned the Leading Freshman Sire of 1993, and Leading Juvenile Sire of 1994.

=== As a Broodmare Sire ===
Seeking The Gold has also achieved prominence as a broodmare sire, as his daughters have produced 76 graded stakes winners with combined progeny earnings of more than $213.8 million. As a broodmare sire, his most notable runners include:

- Blame (US) H, 2006 – won 7 graded stakes, including the 2010 Breeders' Cup Classic, Whitney Handicap, and Stephen Foster Handicap. 2010 Eclipse Champion Older Dirt Male.
- Lord Nelson (US) H, 2012 – won 4 graded races, including the Gr.I Bing Crosby Stakes, Triple Bend Handicap, and Santa Anita Sprint Championship. Nominated for 2016 Eclipse Champion Sprinter.
- Take Charge Brandi (US) F, 2012 – winner of the Starlet Stakes and 2014 Breeders' Cup Juvenile Fillies. 2014 Eclipse Champion Juvenile Filly.
- Questing (US) F, 2009 – winner of the Alabama Stakes and Coaching Club American Oaks. 2012 Eclipse Champion Three-Year-Old Filly.
- She Be Wild (US) F, 2007 – winner of the 2009 Breeders' Cup Juvenile Fillies and Arlington-Washington Lassie Stakes. 2009 Eclipse Champion Juvenile Filly.
- Point of Entry (US) H, 2008 – winner of 5 Gr.I races, including the Man o' War Stakes, Sword Dancer Invitational, Joe Hirsch Turf Classic, Gulfstream Park Turf Handicap, and Manhattan Handicap.
- Excellent Art (GB) H, 2004 – winner of the St. James's Palace Stakes and Mill Reef Stakes.
- White Moonstone (GB) M, 2008 – winner of the Fillies' Mile, May Hill Stakes and Sweet Solera Stakes.
- Majestic Warrior (US) H, 2005 – winner of the Gr.I Hopeful Stakes, sire of 2013 Kentucky Oaks winner Princess of Sylmar.

Other notable descendants include Warrior's Reward, Awesome Slew, Pine Island, Dancing Forever, Pomeroy, Mushka, Robe Decollete, Internallyflawless, Riskaverse, Better Lucky, Lighthouse Bay, Swift Temper, and Graceful Leap (JPN).

== Death ==
After being pensioned from stud duty in November 2008, Seeking the Gold was allowed to continue to reside in one of the stallion barns at Claiborne Farm.

Seeking The Gold was humanely euthanized at Claiborne Farm on July 28, 2016, due to the infirmities of old age. On hearing of the horse's death, Shug McGaughey said "He was a very, very successful racehorse. One of my all-time favorites. He gave 110% every time."

== Pedigree ==
Pedigree of Seeking The Gold, bay stallion, foaled April 7, 1985
Sire Mr. Prospector b. 1970	Raise a Native ch. 1961	Native Dancer gr. 1950	Polynesian
Sire Mr. Prospector b. 1970	Raise a Native ch. 1961	Native Dancer gr. 1950	Geisha
Sire Mr. Prospector b. 1970	Raise a Native ch. 1961	Raise You ch. 1946	Case Ace
Sire Mr. Prospector b. 1970	Raise a Native ch. 1961	Raise You ch. 1946	Lady Glory
Sire Mr. Prospector b. 1970	Gold Digger b. 1962	Nashua b. 1952	Nasrullah
Sire Mr. Prospector b. 1970	Gold Digger b. 1962	Nashua b. 1952	Segula
Sire Mr. Prospector b. 1970	Gold Digger b. 1962	Sequence dkb/br. 1946	Count Fleet
Sire Mr. Prospector b. 1970	Gold Digger b. 1962	Sequence dkb/br. 1946	Miss Dogwood
Dam Con Game dkb/br. 1974	Buckpasser b. 1963	Tom Fool b. 1949	Menow
Dam Con Game dkb/br. 1974	Buckpasser b. 1963	Tom Fool b. 1949	Gaga
Dam Con Game dkb/br. 1974	Buckpasser b. 1963	Busanda blk. 1947	War Admiral
Dam Con Game dkb/br. 1974	Buckpasser b. 1963	Busanda blk. 1947	Businesslike
Dam Con Game dkb/br. 1974	Broadway b. 1959	Hasty Road dkb/br. 1951	Roman
Dam Con Game dkb/br. 1974	Broadway b. 1959	Hasty Road dkb/br. 1951	Traffic Court
Dam Con Game dkb/br. 1974	Broadway b. 1959	Flitabout b. 1945	Challedon
Dam Con Game dkb/br. 1974	Broadway b. 1959	Flitabout b. 1945	Bird Flower (Family 5-c)
