= Henry S. Clark Stakes =

- Class: Ungraded Stakes
- Location: Pimlico Race Course, Baltimore, Maryland, United States
- Inaugurated: 2001
- Race type: Thoroughbred – Flat racing
- Website: www.pimlico.com

Race information
- Distance: 1 mile (8 furlongs)
- Surface: Turf
- Track: Left-handed
- Qualification: Three-year-olds & up
- Weight: Assigned
- Purse: US$100,000

The Henry S. Clark Stakes is an American Thoroughbred horse race run annually at Pimlico Race Course in Baltimore, Maryland. Open to horses three-years-old & up, it is contested over a distance of one mile on turf.

The race was named in honor of U.S. Racing Hall of Fame inductee, Henry S. Clark, the "dean of Maryland trainers", who spent 80 of his 95 years on the backstretch of Maryland's race tracks and remained active until his death in February 1999. He was the grandson of another famous Maryland trainer, William Jennings Sr. In 1982, Henry Clark was honored with induction into the Racing Hall of Fame.

Early in his career, Clark was selected by Liz Whitney to train her stable of runners and he sent out his first stakes winner, Blue Cyprus for Whitney at Garden State in 1944. In the late 1940s, Clark began his relationship with Harry & Jane Lunger, training the talented Christiana Stables' horses. Among those under his care were two-time Delaware Handicap winner Obeah (dam of champion Go For Wand), Endine, champion Tempted, Travers Stakes winner Thinking Cap, Belmont Futurity winner and top sire Cyane and Blue Grass Stakes winner Linkage, who finished second in the 1982 Preakness Stakes.

== Records ==
Speed record:

- 1 mile – 1:33.80 – Private Slip (2001)

Most wins by a jockey:

- 2 – Horacio A. Karamanos (2003, 2006)

Most wins by a trainer:

- 2 – Michael Zwiesler (2007, 2008)

Most wins by an owner:

- 2 – William S. Farish III (2007, 2008)

== Winners of the Henry S. Clark Stakes ==
Year	Winner	Age	Jockey	Trainer	Owner	Distance (Miles)	Time	Purse	Grade
2021	No Race	-	No Race	No Race	No Race	no race	0:00.00	no race	n/a
2020	No Race	-	No Race	No Race	No Race	no race	0:00.00	no race	n/a
2019	Irish Strait	7	Jorge Vargas	H. Graham Motion	Isabelle de Tomaso	1 mile	1:33.93	$100,000	
2018	Caribou Club	4	Paco Lopez	Thomas F. Proctor	Glen Hill Farm	1 mile	1:34.40	$100,000	
2017	Ascend	5	Feargal Lynch	H. Graham Motion	Stone Farm	1 mile	1:36.30	$100,000	
2016	Rose Brier	7	Trevor McCarthy	Jane Sibilli	Panic Stable	1 mile	1:33.11	$100,000	
2015	Talk Show Man	5	Xavier Perez	Hamilton Smith	Michael Harrison	1 mile	1:36.09	$100,000	
2014	Hamp	4	Javier Santiago	Ignacio Correas	Sagamore Farm	1 mile	1:39.66	$100,000	
2013	Eighttofasttocatch	7	Forrest Boyce	Tim Keefe	Sylvia E. Heft	1 mile	1:43.91	$91,750	
2012	Hudson Steele	5	Javier Castellano	Todd A. Pletcher	Roger Weiss	1 mile	1:40.00	$75,000	
2011	Pocket Patch	6	Jonathan Joyce	Flint W. Stites	Charles McGill	1 mile	1:40.04	$75,000	
2010	Baltimore Bob	5	Vladimir Diaz	John B. Secor	R. Gerczak & Kaygar Stable	1 mile	1:35.39	$70,000	
2009	Brickell	8	Harry Vega	Ted Maher	Harry Kassap LLC	1 mile	1:38.80	$75,000	
2008	Stay Close	6	Rosie Napravnik	Michael Zwiesler	William S. Farish	1 mile	1:35.82	$75,000	
2007	Stay Close	5	Oliver Castillo	Michael Zwiesler	William S. Farish	1 mile	1:37.20	$75,000	
2006	Saint Stephen	6	Horacio A. Karamanos	Christophe Clement	Susan & Charles Harris	1 mile	1:35.40	$60,000	
2005	Gunning For	4	José C. Ferrer	Timothy Walsh	Wimborne Farm Inc.	1 mile	1:34.20	$50,000	
2004	Mr. O'Brien	5	Rick Wilson	Robin L. Graham	Skeedattle Stable	1 mile	1:35.80	$60,000	
2003	Tam's Terms	5	Horacio A. Karamanos	Lawrence E. Murray	Sondra D. Bender	1 mile	1:36.40	$75,000	
2002	Mus-If	6	Mario Pino	Michael V. Pino	Hamdan Al Maktoum	1 mile	1:36.20	$50,000	
2001	Private Slip	7	Joe Rocco	Dale Capuano	Crown Valley Stable	1 mile	1:33.40	$75,000	

== See also ==
- Henry S. Clark Stakes top three finishers and starters
- Pimlico Race Course
- List of graded stakes at Pimlico Race Course
