= Compton Admiral =

British-bred Thoroughbred racehorse

- Sire: Suave Dancer
- Grandsire: Green Dancer
- Dam: Sumoto
- Damsire: Mtoto
- Sex: Stallion
- Foaled: 11 January 1996
- Country: United Kingdom
- Colour: Bay
- Breeder: Hascombe and Valiant Studs
- Owner: Erik Penser
- Trainer: Gerard Butler
- Record: 10: 3-3-1
- Earnings: £222,907

Major wins
- Craven Stakes (1999); Eclipse Stakes (1999)

Compton Admiral (foaled 11 January 1996) was a British Thoroughbred racehorse and sire best known for his upset win over a strong field in the 1999 Eclipse Stakes. He showed promising form as a two-year-old in 1998, winning one of his four races and finishing second in both the Chesham Stakes and the Solario Stakes. In the following year he won the Craven Stakes on his debut but ran poorly in both the 2000 Guineas and The Derby before winning the Eclipse at odds of 20/1. His later career was severely restricted by injury and he was retired to stud in 2001. He made no impact as a sire of winners.

== Background ==
Compton Admiral was a bay horse with a white star bred by Hascombe & Valiants Studs, a breeding organisation run by Philip Oppenheimer a member of the family that controlled the De Beers Mining Company. He was one of the best horses sired by Suave Dancer an American-bred horse which won the Prix du Jockey Club, Irish Champion Stakes and Prix de l'Arc de Triomphe in 1989. Compton Admiral was the second foal produced by Sumoto, a mare who won two races and went on to produce the Queen Elizabeth II Stakes winner Summoner. In October, Compton Admiral was sent to the Tattersalls Sales at Newmarket where he was bought for 21,000 guineas by the Swedish businessman Erik Penser. The colt was sent for training with Gerard Butler at Blewbury.

== Racing career ==
=== 1998: two-year-old season ===
Compton Admiral's first race was a six furlong maiden at Goodwood Racecourse on 5 June in which he was ridden by Frankie Dettori. After starting poorly, he recovered to take the lead approaching the final furlong but was overtaken in the closing stages and beaten half a length by Muqtarib, a colt who went on to win the Richmond Stakes. Two weeks later, Compton Admiral was moved up in class and distance for the Listed Chesham Stakes over even furlongs at Royal Ascot. After failing to obtain a clear run a furlong out, he finished strongly but failed by a head to catch Rhapodist. The colt was dropped back to maiden company at Ascot in July and recorded his first success as he was ridden by Pat Eddery to a one length win over the odds-on favourite Killer Instinct. Compton Admiral' last race of the season was the Group Three Solario Stakes at Sandown Park Racecourse on 24 August. He started the 13/8 favourite against seven opponents but was beaten one and a quarter lengths into second by Raise A Grand.

=== 1999: three-year-old season ===
0 Compton Admiral began his second season on 15 April at Newmarket when he was ridden by Dettori in the Craven Stakes, a major trial race for the 2000 Guineas. He started at odds of 13/2, with the Dewhurst Stakes winner Mujahid being made the 2/5 favourite in a field of seven runners. Dettori restrained the colt at the back of the field before making progress in the last quarter mile. He took the lead a furlong from the finish and won by a length from Brancaster with Mujahid running poorly in fifth. Sixteen days later Compton Admiral started at odds of 10/1 in the 2000 Guineas, which was run over the July course at Newmarket as the traditional Rowley Mile course was being redeveloped. Ridden by Eddery, the colt was never in contention and finished thirteenth of the sixteen runners behind Island Sands.

In June, Compton Admiral was moved up in distance to contest the 220th running of the Derby over one and a half miles at Epsom Downs Racecourse. Starting as a 25/1 outsider, he made little impact, finishing eighth of the sixteen runners, eight lengths behind the winner Oath. Four weeks after his run at Epsom, the colt was matched against older horses for the first time in the Group One Eclipse Stakes over ten furlongs at Sandown. He started the 20/1 outsider of the eight runners in a strong field which included Fantastic Light, Xaar, Chester House and the French-trained favourite Croco Rouge. Ridden for the first time by Darryll Holland, Compton Admiral was towards the rear of the field in the early stages before moving up to track the leader Xaar in the straight. Holland lost his grip on the colt's reins approaching the final furlong but recovered to overtake Xaar 75 yards from the finish and won by a neck, with Fantastic Light half a length away in third. On 17 August started at odds of 10/1 for the International Stakes at York Racecourse in which he was again ridden by Holland. He finished fifth of the twelve runners behind Royal Anthem, Greek Dance, Chester House and Almushtarak. Compton Admiral then sustained a chipped bone in his knee which ruled him out for the rest of the year.

=== 2001: five-year-old season ===
After undergoing surgery for his knee injury Compton Admiral had further training setbacks and missed the whole of the 2000 season before returning as a five-year-old in 2001. On his reappearance he finished third behind Dramatic Quest and Man o' Mystery in a race over ten furlongs at Newbury Racecourse on 30 May. The horse was being prepared for an attempt to win the Eclipse Stakes for a second time when he sustained a tendon injury which ended his racing career. Commenting on the news of the horse's injury, Butler said: "We have waited a year and a half for this and two days before the race it all comes to nothing. It's absolutely shattering".

== Stud record ==
Compton Admiral was retired from racing to become a breeding stallion at his owner's stud. He appears to have attracted very little public support, being mainly engaged in covering mares owned by Penser. He sired several minor winners, but nothing of top class.

== Pedigree ==
Pedigree of Compton Admiral (GB), bay horse, 1996
Sire Suave Dancer (USA) 1988	Green Dancer (USA); 1972	Nijinsky	Northern Dancer
Sire Suave Dancer (USA) 1988	Green Dancer (USA); 1972	Nijinsky	Flaming Page
Sire Suave Dancer (USA) 1988	Green Dancer (USA); 1972	Green Valley	Val de Loir
Sire Suave Dancer (USA) 1988	Green Dancer (USA); 1972	Green Valley	Sly Pola
Sire Suave Dancer (USA) 1988	Suavite (USA); 1981	Alleged	Hoist the Flag
Sire Suave Dancer (USA) 1988	Suavite (USA); 1981	Alleged	Princess Pout
Sire Suave Dancer (USA) 1988	Suavite (USA); 1981	Guinevere's Folly	Round Table
Sire Suave Dancer (USA) 1988	Suavite (USA); 1981	Guinevere's Folly	Lodge
Dam Sumoto (GB) 1990	Mtoto (GB); 1983	Busted	Crepello
Dam Sumoto (GB) 1990	Mtoto (GB); 1983	Busted	Sans le Sou
Dam Sumoto (GB) 1990	Mtoto (GB); 1983	Amazer	Mincio
Dam Sumoto (GB) 1990	Mtoto (GB); 1983	Amazer	Alzaro
Dam Sumoto (GB) 1990	Soemba (GB); 1983	General Assembly	Secretariat
Dam Sumoto (GB) 1990	Soemba (GB); 1983	General Assembly	Exclusive Dancer
Dam Sumoto (GB) 1990	Soemba (GB); 1983	Seven Seas	Riverman
Dam Sumoto (GB) 1990	Soemba (GB); 1983	Seven Seas	Ya Ya (family: 7-a)
