= Flanders (horse) =

American Thoroughbred racing filly

- Sire: Seeking the Gold
- Grandsire: Mr. Prospector
- Dam: Starlet Storm
- Damsire: Storm Bird
- Sex: Filly
- Foaled: 1992
- Country: United States
- Breeder: Overbrook Farm
- Owner: John Magnier
- Trainer: D. Wayne Lukas
- Record: 5: 4-0-0
- Earnings: $805,000

Major wins
- Frizette Stakes, Spinaway Stakes Breeders' Cup wins: Breeders' Cup Juvenile Fillies (1994)

Awards
- American Champion Two-Year-Old Filly

Flanders (1992 – February 2010) was an American Thoroughbred racing filly. In 1994, she won all five of her races, although she was disqualified from the Matron Stakes and placed last due to testing positive for the prohibited therapeutic drug isoxsuprine. She then went on to win the Frizette Stakes by 21 lengths. She is best known for winning the Breeders' Cup Juvenile Fillies. She came out of the race with a condylar fracture of the cannon bone and a fractured sesamoid. She underwent surgery and was retired in early 1995. She was euthanized in February 2010 because of complications following a paddock accident.

== Pedigree ==
Pedigree of Flanders (USA), chestnut filly, 1992
Sire Seeking the Gold (USA) 1985	Mr. Prospector (USA); 1970	Raise a Native (USA)	Native Dancer (USA)
Sire Seeking the Gold (USA) 1985	Mr. Prospector (USA); 1970	Raise a Native (USA)	Raise You (USA)
Sire Seeking the Gold (USA) 1985	Mr. Prospector (USA); 1970	Gold Digger (USA)	Nashua (USA)
Sire Seeking the Gold (USA) 1985	Mr. Prospector (USA); 1970	Gold Digger (USA)	Sequence (USA)
Sire Seeking the Gold (USA) 1985	Con Game (USA); 1974	Buckpasser (USA)	Tom Fool (USA)
Sire Seeking the Gold (USA) 1985	Con Game (USA); 1974	Buckpasser (USA)	Busanda (USA)
Sire Seeking the Gold (USA) 1985	Con Game (USA); 1974	Broadway (USA)	Hasty Road (USA)
Sire Seeking the Gold (USA) 1985	Con Game (USA); 1974	Broadway (USA)	Flitabout (USA)
Dam Starlet Storm (USA) 1987	Storm Bird (CAN); 1978	Northern Dancer (CAN)	Nearctic (CAN)
Dam Starlet Storm (USA) 1987	Storm Bird (CAN); 1978	Northern Dancer (CAN)	Natalma (USA)
Dam Starlet Storm (USA) 1987	Storm Bird (CAN); 1978	South (CAN)	New Providence (CAN)
Dam Starlet Storm (USA) 1987	Storm Bird (CAN); 1978	South (CAN)	Shining Sun (USA)
Dam Starlet Storm (USA) 1987	Cinegita (USA); 1977	Secretariat (USA)	Bold Ruler (USA)
Dam Starlet Storm (USA) 1987	Cinegita (USA); 1977	Secretariat (USA)	Somethingroyal (USA)
Dam Starlet Storm (USA) 1987	Cinegita (USA); 1977	Wanika (USA)	Sadair (USA)
Dam Starlet Storm (USA) 1987	Cinegita (USA); 1977	Wanika (USA)	Juanita (USA)
