= Fairy King (horse) =

American-bred Thoroughbred racehorse

- Sire: Northern Dancer
- Grandsire: Nearctic
- Dam: Fairy Bridge
- Damsire: Bold Reason
- Sex: Stallion
- Foaled: 1982
- Country: United States
- Colour: Bay
- Breeder: Swettenham Stud & Partners
- Owner: Robert Sangster
- Trainer: Vincent O'Brien
- Record: 1: 0-0-0
- Earnings: Nil

Major wins
- None

Awards
- Leading sire in France (1996)

Fairy King (1982–1999) was an American-bred Thoroughbred racehorse and a successful sire.

== Background ==
A full brother to Sadler's Wells, he was bred and raced by Robert Sangster and associates. Out of the mare Fairy Bridge, he was sired by Northern Dancer who is regarded as the 20th century's best sire of sires.

== Racing career ==
Fairy King made only one racing start and broke down with damage to a bone in his foot.

== Stud record ==
Retired to stud duty at the Coolmore Stud breeding operation in Ireland, Fairy King most often sired specialist milers. Initially he carried a low stud fee but success from his first crops led to him quickly being much in demand. He stood in Ireland throughout his career and was shuttled to Australia in 1992 and again in 1996.

Fairy King sired 395 race winners, including 73 stakes race winners. Among his notable offspring were:

- Pharaoh's Delight (1987) - won Phoenix Stakes
- Shinko King (b. 1991) - multiple stakes winner in Japan including the Group 1 Takamatsunomiyahai
- Turtle Island (b. 1991) - won Group One Phoenix Stakes and Irish 2000 Guineas
- Encosta De Lago (b. 1993) - won the 1996 Australian Group One Vic Health Cup against older horses, Leading sire in Australia (2008, 2009)
- Helissio (b. 1993) - won Prix de l'Arc de Triomphe, 1996 European Horse of the Year
- Second Empire (b. 1995) - won Group 1 Grand Criterium
- Princely Heir (b. 1995) - won Phoenix Stakes
- Victory Note (b. 1995) - won Poule d'Essai des Poulains
- Oath (b. 1996) - won 1999 Epsom Derby
- Falbrav (b. 1998) - 2003 European Champion Older Horse, careering earnings of £3,837,108
- Beckett (b. 1998) - won Irish Group 1 National Stakes

Suffering from laminitis, Fairy King was euthanized at Coolmore Stud on June 5, 1999.

== Pedigree ==
Pedigree of Fairy King
Sire Northern Dancer	Nearctic	Nearco	Pharos
Sire Northern Dancer	Nearctic	Nearco	Nogara
Sire Northern Dancer	Nearctic	Lady Angela	Hyperion
Sire Northern Dancer	Nearctic	Lady Angela	Sister Sarah
Sire Northern Dancer	Natalma	Native Dancer	Polynesian
Sire Northern Dancer	Natalma	Native Dancer	Geisha
Sire Northern Dancer	Natalma	Almahmoud	Mahmoud
Sire Northern Dancer	Natalma	Almahmoud	Arbitrator
Dam Fairy Bridge	Bold Reason	Hail To Reason	Turn-To
Dam Fairy Bridge	Bold Reason	Hail To Reason	Nothirdchance
Dam Fairy Bridge	Bold Reason	Lalun	Djeddah
Dam Fairy Bridge	Bold Reason	Lalun	Be Faithful
Dam Fairy Bridge	Special	Forli	Aristophanes
Dam Fairy Bridge	Special	Forli	Trevisa
Dam Fairy Bridge	Special	Thong	Nantallah
Dam Fairy Bridge	Special	Thong	Rough Shod
