= Island Sands =

Irish-bred Thoroughbred racehorse

- Racing colours of Godolphin, carried by Island Sands in his Classic win.
- Sire: Turtle Island
- Grandsire: Fairy King
- Dam: Tiavanita
- Damsire: J. O. Tobin
- Sex: Stallion
- Foaled: 27 January 1996
- Country: Ireland
- Colour: Dark Bay or Brown
- Breeder: Mrs T. V. Ryan
- Owner: Mrs Michael Meredith; Godolphin Racing; Maktoum Al Maktoum
- Trainer: David Elsworth; Saeed bin Suroor; David Loder
- Record: 9:4-2-1
- Earnings: £213,623

Major wins
- 2000 Guineas (1999)

Island Sands (foaled 27 January 1996) was an Irish-bred Thoroughbred racehorse and sire. In a career that lasted from August 1998 to June 2001 he ran nine times and won four races. His most notable success came in his first race as a three-year-old in 1999, when he won the 2,000 Guineas at Newmarket. His subsequent career was restricted by injury and he won only one minor race in the next two years. He retired to a stud career in China.

== Background ==
Island Sands was described as a "most attractive" brown horse with a small white star and four white feet and stood 16 hands high. He was bred at the Kilcoran House Stud in County Tipperary, Ireland by Mrs T. V. Ryan. He was sired by Turtle Island out of the mare Tiavanita. Turtle Island won six races, most notably the 1994 Irish 2,000 Guineas which he won by fifteen lengths on his favoured soft ground. At stud, he has sired the winners of over four hundred races, but Island Sands, from his first crop of foals, remains his only winner at Group One level. Tiavanita failed to win a race but was a half-sister of Corrupt, who won the Great Voltigeur Stakes and started joint-favourite for the 1991 Epsom Derby. As a yearling, Island Sands was sent to the Goffs Sale in October, where he was bought for IR£18,000 by the British trainer David Elsworth.

== Racing career ==
=== 1998: two-year-old season ===
Island Sands made his first appearance in a six furlong maiden race at Salisbury in August 1998. Ridden by the apprentice jockey Alan Daly, he took the lead in the final furlong and won by two lengths from Victory Spin and twelve other runners. Five weeks later he returned to Salisbury for the Cranbourne Stakes in which he started favourite at odds of 4/6 and won by two lengths from Locombe Hill. After this race he was bought by Godolphin Racing and sent to spend the winter in Dubai, where he was trained by Saeed bin Suroor.

=== 1999: three-year-old season ===
Early in 1999 Island Sands won a private trial race against other Godolphin horses at Nad Al Sheba, which led to him being aimed at the 2000 Guineas, whilst the Godolphin team's best two-year-old of 1998, Aljabr traveled to the United States for an abortive attempt at the Kentucky Derby.

On 1 May 1999, Island Sands started the 10/1 sixth choice in the betting for the sixteen runner 2000 Guineas. As the Rowley Mile course was being redeveloped, the race was run on the Newmarket July course for the first time since 1945. The field split into two groups, with Island Sands, ridden by Frankie Dettori, leading the larger group on the side of the course further from the stands. Two furlongs from the finish he established an overall lead and ran on well in the closing stages to win by a neck from the strong-finishing Greenham Stakes winner Enrique, with Mujahid third. Dettori explained that he had not intended to make the running but had decided to let the colt go on when he started exceptionally well. Commenting on the finish, he said that he had been worried by Enrique's challenge but that "my fellow ran on really well again". Three weeks later, Island Sands started favourite for the Irish 2000 Guineas at the Curragh, but failed to reproduce his Newmarket form. He was never traveling well and appeared to be struggling three furlongs from the end of the race before finishing fifth of the ten runners, beaten more than seven lengths by the Aidan O'Brien-trained Saffron Walden. An injury then kept him off the racecourse for the remainder of the year.

=== 2000–2001: later career ===
After a break of fifteen months, Island Sands returned to the racecourse in August 2000 in the Group Three Prix Quincey at Deauville, for which he was made 9/10 favourite. Frankie Dettori attempted to make all the running on the colt, but he was overtaken in the closing stages and beaten one and a half lengths by the three-year-old filly Penny's Gold. A recurrence of his injury problems then ruled him out for the rest of the season.

Island Sands returned as a five-year-old in 2001 and won once from four starts. By this time his ownership had been transferred to Maktoum Al Maktoum and he was trained by David Loder. In March he ran in the Prix Edmond Blanc at Saint-Cloud, and after leading for most of the way, finished second to Golani. In the Group Two Sandown Mile a month later, he led from the start as usual before finishing third to Nicobar and Swalow Flight. For his next appearance, Island Sands was dropped in class to run in a minor stakes race over one mile at Haydock Park Racecourse in May and won by eight lengths at odds of 4/11. He returned to top class racing in the Queen Anne Stakes at Royal Ascot but after leading in the early stages he dropped away to finish last of the ten runners behind Medicean.

== Assessment ==
In the 1999 International Classification, Island Sands was given a rating of 116, a very low mark for a Classic winner, and 19 pounds below the top-rated three-year-old Montjeu. The Racing Post was more generous, giving him a rating of 121.

== Stud career ==
Island Sands was exported to stand as a stallion in China.

== Pedigree ==
Pedigree of Island Sands (GB), dark bay/brown stallion, 1996
Sire Turtle Island (GB) 1991	Fairy King; 1982	Northern Dancer	Nearctic
Sire Turtle Island (GB) 1991	Fairy King; 1982	Northern Dancer	Natalma
Sire Turtle Island (GB) 1991	Fairy King; 1982	Fairy Bridge	Bold Reason
Sire Turtle Island (GB) 1991	Fairy King; 1982	Fairy Bridge	Special
Sire Turtle Island (GB) 1991	Sisania; 1983	High Top	Derring-Do
Sire Turtle Island (GB) 1991	Sisania; 1983	High Top	Camenae
Sire Turtle Island (GB) 1991	Sisania; 1983	Targo's Delight	Targowice
Sire Turtle Island (GB) 1991	Sisania; 1983	Targo's Delight	Co-Optimist
Dam Tiavanita (GB) 1986	J. O. Tobin; 1974	Never Bend	Nasrullah
Dam Tiavanita (GB) 1986	J. O. Tobin; 1974	Never Bend	Lalun
Dam Tiavanita (GB) 1986	J. O. Tobin; 1974	Hill Shade	Hillary
Dam Tiavanita (GB) 1986	J. O. Tobin; 1974	Hill Shade	Penumbra
Dam Tiavanita (GB) 1986	Nirvanita; 1971	Right Royal	Owen Tudor
Dam Tiavanita (GB) 1986	Nirvanita; 1971	Right Royal	Bastia
Dam Tiavanita (GB) 1986	Nirvanita; 1971	Nuclea	Orsini
Dam Tiavanita (GB) 1986	Nirvanita; 1971	Nuclea	Nixe (Family:4-r)
