= Oath (horse) =

Irish-bred Thoroughbred racehorse

- Racing colours of The Thoroughbred Corp
- Sire: Fairy King
- Grandsire: Northern Dancer
- Dam: Sheer Audacity
- Damsire: Troy
- Sex: Stallion
- Foaled: 1996
- Country: Ireland
- Colour: bay
- Breeder: Mrs Max Morris
- Owner: The Thoroughbred Corp.
- Trainer: Henry Cecil
- Record: 7: 3-1-1
- Earnings: £647,419

Major wins
- Dee Stakes (1999); Epsom Derby (1999)
- Last updated on August 24, 2007

Oath (foaled 22 April 1996) is a retired Thoroughbred race horse, bred in Ireland and trained by Henry Cecil in Great Britain, best known for winning the 1999 Epsom Derby. He was injured in his next race and never ran again.

He is currently an active sire standing in India.

== Background ==
Oath was foaled on 22 April 1996 in Ireland. He is a small, "neat" bay horse bred in Ireland by Mrs Max Morris. He was from one of the last groups of foals sired by the Northern Dancer stallion Fairy King out of the Troy mare Sheer Audacity. Apart from Oath, Fairy King, who died in 1999, sired the winners of over five-hundred races, including Helissio (Prix de l'Arc de Triomphe) and Falbrav (Japan Cup).

His dam, Sheer Audacity produced several good winners, the most notable being Pelder, who won three Group One races, including the Prix Ganay.

As a yearling, Oath was sent to the Goffs sales in County Kildare, where he was bought for IR£450,000 by The Thoroughbred Corporation, a syndicate headed by the Saudi prince Ahmed bin Salman (1958–2003). Like all of Salman's horses, which included War Emblem, Point Given and Royal Anthem, Oath raced in a distinctive white bridle.

He was originally sent into training with Roger Charlton at Beckhampton, but after his first race he was moved to the stable of Henry Cecil at Newmarket. After his move, he was ridden in all his races by Kieren Fallon.

== Racing career ==
=== 1998: two-year-old season ===
Oath made his racecourse debut in a maiden race at Goodwood in June. Ridden by Tim Sprake, he finished fifth of the eight runners, beaten two and a half lengths in a race which looked very good in retrospect: the winner Muqtarib won the Richmond Stakes in July, whilst the runner-up Compton Admiral went on to win the following year's Eclipse Stakes.

At Yarmouth in September, he finished third in a field of seventeen on his debut for Cecil, after appearing to have "every chance". Oath won at the third attempt in a maiden race at Nottingham in October. He led early and ran on strongly after being headed to win by two and a half lengths from modest opposition.

His official end of season rating of 91 suggested that he had a future as a racehorse, but that he was around thirty pounds below top class.

=== 1999: three-year-old season ===
==== Spring ====
Oath's three-year-old debut in a minor stakes race at Newbury showed that he had made some progress over the winter. He led from the start and stayed on well under pressure before finishing second, beaten a neck by the future Group race winner Lucido. The race was also his first opportunity to race over middle distances, and his improvement suggested that his stamina would be a strength.

The first indication that he might be a top class colt came in his next start, in which he was tried in conditions race company for the first time in the Listed Dee Stakes a recognised trial for the Derby, run at Chester. Oath showed ability far beyond anything he had previously revealed, by travelling "effortlessly", taking the lead two furlongs from the finish, and winning by five lengths, with Fallon easing the colt down in the closing strides. Fallon was pleased with the colt's progress, and Willie Carson, representing the owners said that the colt was an ideal Derby type whilst expressing some doubts about his ability to stay the trip. Oath's rapid progress and the high reputation of his trainer, who had already sent out three Derby winners, saw him enter contention for the Derby, with bookmakers offering him at odds of 14/1.

The remaining Derby trials revealed no outstanding contenders, and Oath, who at least had solid winning form and seemed to be improving, was shortened to 6-1 joint-favourite by the end of the following week.

==== Summer ====
The Derby of 1999, run in cold wet conditions, was a very open race, with many lightly-tested colts and only one previous Group One winner, the Irish-trained Saffron Walden. The highly regarded, but untested Dubai Millennium started favourite at 5/1, with Oath and Lucido joint second in the betting at 13/2. Before the Derby, the horses are paraded in front of the stands. Fallon broke away from the parade early and took Oath, who was described as "restive" and "hot-headed" directly to the start. In the race Oath was always in contention, and turned into the straight in fifth place behind the leader All The Way. Two furlongs out Daliapour was sent into the lead, and Fallon made his challenge on Oath. The two colts ran together for several strides before Oath pulled ahead and was driven out by Fallon to win by one and three quarter lengths. After the race Fallon was penalised for breaking out of the parade, although Cecil revealed that the jockey was acting under his instructions and had been told to "not worry about the fine."

The intention was that Oath would run in the Irish Derby where he would be matched against the Prix du Jockey Club winner Montjeu, while his stable companion, the four-year-old Royal Anthem would contest the King George VI & Queen Elizabeth Stakes. The plan was changed when an injury to Royal Anthem ruled him out of the King George and Oath was made the new favourite for the race. Shortly afterwards, Oath was withdrawn from the Irish Derby after performing poorly in a home gallop and so went straight to the race at Ascot without another start.

In the King George VI & Queen Elizabeth Stakes Oath faced older horses, including the multiple Group One winner Daylami, for the first time. Oath, was still a relatively unexposed colt, and hopes that he was still improving led to him being sent off the 9/4 favourite. He ran well for most of the race, but when Fallon tried to move the colt towards the lead in the straight he was soon struggling and faded badly. He finished seventh of the eight runners, ahead Daliapour, in what the Independent's correspondent described as a "lamentable" performance by the only two three-year-olds in the field.

The reason for Oath's poor run was revealed shortly afterwards as he came back lame. Examinations revealed that he had broken a bone in his knee. The injury was so serious that the colt's connections said that it would be a "miracle" if he ran again that season, although there were hopes that he could return as a four-year-old.

In October it was announced that Oath's racing career was over, and that he had been sold to Japanese breeders for $8,000,000.

== Race record ==
Date	Race	Dist (f)	Course	Class	Prize (£K)	Odds	Runners	Placing	Margin	Time	Jockey	Trainer
5 June 1998	EBF Hitachi Seiki Maiden Stakes	6	Goodwood	M	4	6/1	8	5	2.5	1:11.54	Tim Sprake	Roger Charlton
16 September 1998	EBF Fleggborough Maiden Stakes	7	Yarmouth	M	3	9/4	17	3	2	1:27.30	Kieren Fallon	Henry Cecil
14 October 1998	EBF Maiden Stakes	8	Nottingham	M	3	4/5	8	1	2.5	1:52.80	Kieren Fallon	Henry Cecil
17 April 1999	Compton Conditions Stakes	10	Newbury		9	3/1	8	2	Neck	2:09.43	Kieren Fallon	Henry Cecil
6 May 1999	Dee Stakes	10	Chester	L	28	2/1	7	1	5	2:10.51	Kieren Fallon	Henry Cecil
5 June 1999	Derby	12	Epsom	1	611	13/2	16	1	1.7.5	2:37.43	Kieren Fallon	Henry Cecil
4 July 1999	King George VI and Queen Elizabeth Stakes	12	Ascot	1	342	9/4	8	7	11.5	2:29.35	Kieren Fallon	Henry Cecil

== Assessment ==
Oath has been considered to be one of the least distinguished winners of the Derby. John Randall, writing in the Racing Post rated him the second-worst Derby-winner since 1945.

Immediately after the Derby, Oath was rated an "average" Derby winner, with a rating of 123. His injury meant that unlike many Derby winners, he never had the opportunity to improve on this assessment. When the International Classification for the year were released in January, Oath's rating placed him twelve pounds below the European champion Montjeu (135).

== Stud career ==
Oath began his career at stud by standing at the Yushun Stallion Station in Hokkaido Japan, where he is reported to have had limited success.

In 2006 he was returned to Ireland, with the intention that he would stand at the Coolagown Stud in County Cork. The plans were changed however, and in October 2006 Oath was put up for auction at the Goresbridge sales in County Kilkenny. The bidding reached €205,000, before he was sold to the Martin Donohoe. Donohoe was acting for the bloodstock agent Hugo Merry, who was in turn acting on behalf of the Maharajah of Idar.

According to one report in 2011, he sired winners in India. He currently stands at the Pratap Stud in Gujarat.

== Pedigree ==
Pedigree of Oath (IRE), bay stallion, 1996
Sire Fairy King (USA) 1982	Northern Dancer; 1961	Nearctic	Nearco
Sire Fairy King (USA) 1982	Northern Dancer; 1961	Nearctic	Lady Angela
Sire Fairy King (USA) 1982	Northern Dancer; 1961	Natalma	Native Dancer
Sire Fairy King (USA) 1982	Northern Dancer; 1961	Natalma	Almahmoud
Sire Fairy King (USA) 1982	Fairy Bridge; 1975	Bold Reason	Hail To Reason
Sire Fairy King (USA) 1982	Fairy Bridge; 1975	Bold Reason	Lalun
Sire Fairy King (USA) 1982	Fairy Bridge; 1975	Special	Forli
Sire Fairy King (USA) 1982	Fairy Bridge; 1975	Special	Thong
Dam Sheer Audacity (IRE) 1984	Troy; 1976	Petingo	Petition
Dam Sheer Audacity (IRE) 1984	Troy; 1976	Petingo	Alcazar
Dam Sheer Audacity (IRE) 1984	Troy; 1976	La Milo	Hornbeam
Dam Sheer Audacity (IRE) 1984	Troy; 1976	La Milo	Pin Prick
Dam Sheer Audacity (IRE) 1984	Miss Upward; 1964	Alcide	Alycidon
Dam Sheer Audacity (IRE) 1984	Miss Upward; 1964	Alcide	Chenille
Dam Sheer Audacity (IRE) 1984	Miss Upward; 1964	Aiming High	Djebe
Dam Sheer Audacity (IRE) 1984	Miss Upward; 1964	Aiming High	Annie Oakley (family 1-k)
