= Encosta De Lago =

Australian Thoroughbred racehorse

- Sire: Fairy King (USA)
- Grandsire: Northern Dancer (CAN)
- Dam: Shoal Creek
- Damsire: Star Way (GB)
- Sex: Stallion
- Foaled: 27 October 1993
- Died: 6 November 2018 (aged 25)
- Country: Australia
- Colour: Bay
- Breeder: Emirates Park (Vic) Pty Ltd, Victoria
- Owner: Joe Throsby, Lee Freedman, John Magnier, Eddie Irwin, Ken Barry, Duncan Grimley; 2. Coolmore Stud
- Trainer: Lee Freedman
- Record: 8: 3–0–3
- Earnings: A$469,850

Major wins
- Vic Health Cup (1996); Ascot Vale Stakes (1996); Bill Stutt Stakes (1996)

Awards
- 2008, 2009 Leading sire in Australia
- Last updated on 4 October 2010

Encosta De Lago (27 October 1993 – 6 October 2018) was an Australian bred Thoroughbred racehorse that won three group races from eight starts including the Group One (G1), Vic Health Cup against older horses. He was the Leading sire in Australia during 2008 and 2009.

He was a bay stallion with good conformation that was bred by Emirates Park (Vic) Pty Ltd. Encosta de Lago is by Fairy King (USA) a brother to Sadler's Wells, who has sired over 400 winners that have won over A$54.3 million. His dam, Shoal Creek (by Star Way (GB)), is a half-sister to Flying Spur and great granddaughter of the famous Northern Dancer mare, Fanfreluche (USA). Shoal Creek has produced four named foals which included:

- 1999 bay or brown colt, Diera Creek by Snaadee (USA)
- 2002 chestnut colt, Salman by Danewin
- 2006 bay or brown filly, Zyoon, by Al Maher, but none of these horses are currently stakes-winners.

== Racing record ==
=== At the age of two years ===
Encosta de Lago had two race starts for 2 thirds in the VRC Maribyrnong Plate [G2] and the Listed, MRC Debutant Stakes for $12,600 in prizemoney.

=== At the age of three years ===
At three he won the G1, MRC Vic Health Cup over 1,400 metres and the G2, VRC Ascot Vale Stakes over 1,200 m. He then finished third in the G1 MRC Caulfield Guineas. Prior to the running of the G2 MVRC Bill Stutt Stakes over 1,600 metres at Moonee Valley Encosta de Lago returned a test over the legal limit to the performance-enhancing substance TC02, or bicarbonate, commonly called a milkshake. A second test showed a lower level, however the analyst and official vet ordered a third, also came up under the limit and Encosta De Lago was permitted to start and won this, his last start, easily. As a three-year-old he had 6 starts for 3 wins and 1 third and $457,250.

Total racing record: 8 starts for 3 wins and 3 thirds for $469,850 in prizemoney.

Trainer, Lee Freedman commented that "Encosta De Lago is one of the most gifted horses I have trained, so it is of no surprise that he has become a champion stallion. He was an imposing colt with magnificent action and turn of foot, traits he has passed on to his offspring. His win in the VicHealth Cup was miraculous. Injury curtailed his racing career, but it probably helped him as a stallion."

== Stud record ==
When Encosta De Lago retired from racing in 1997 he stood at Blue Gum Farm, Euroa, Victoria for an introductory fee of $8,500, which increased to $38,500 in 2003.

In 2004 Coolmore Stud purchased Encosta De Lago and he was relocated to their stud at Jerrys Plains, New South Wales. Here he first stood for a reported fee of $132,000, making him then Australasia's highest-priced stallion.

Encosta de Lago became one of the most sought after sires in Australia and in 2006 his service fee increased to $176,000. He travelled to Coolmore Stud in Ireland, for part of the Northern Hemisphere breeding season, from March 2007 until August 2007 when he served 66 mares. When he returned to Australia he was one of the first horses to contract equine influenza (E.I.) while in quarantine.

He was the Leading sire in Australia in 2007–08 and 2008–09; and second in 2005–06 and 2006–07. In 2008 Encosta de Lago's service fee rose to $302,500 and he served 227 mares that season who produced 166 live foals for an 80.0% fertility rating. That season he placed second, by number of mares covered in Australia, behind Fastnet Rock.

Some of his most successful G1 or G2 winning progeny includes:

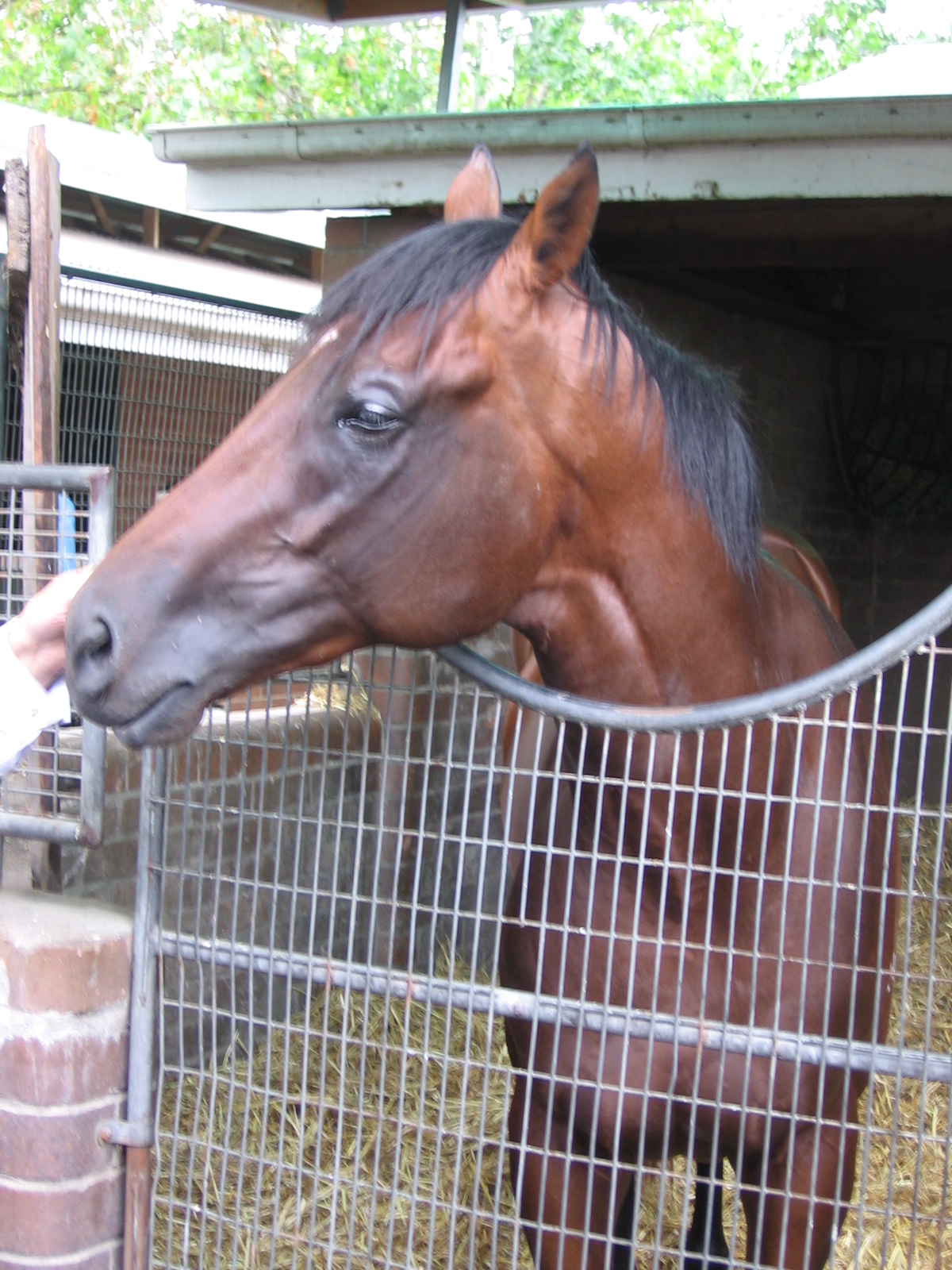
Sirmione by Encosta De Lago.

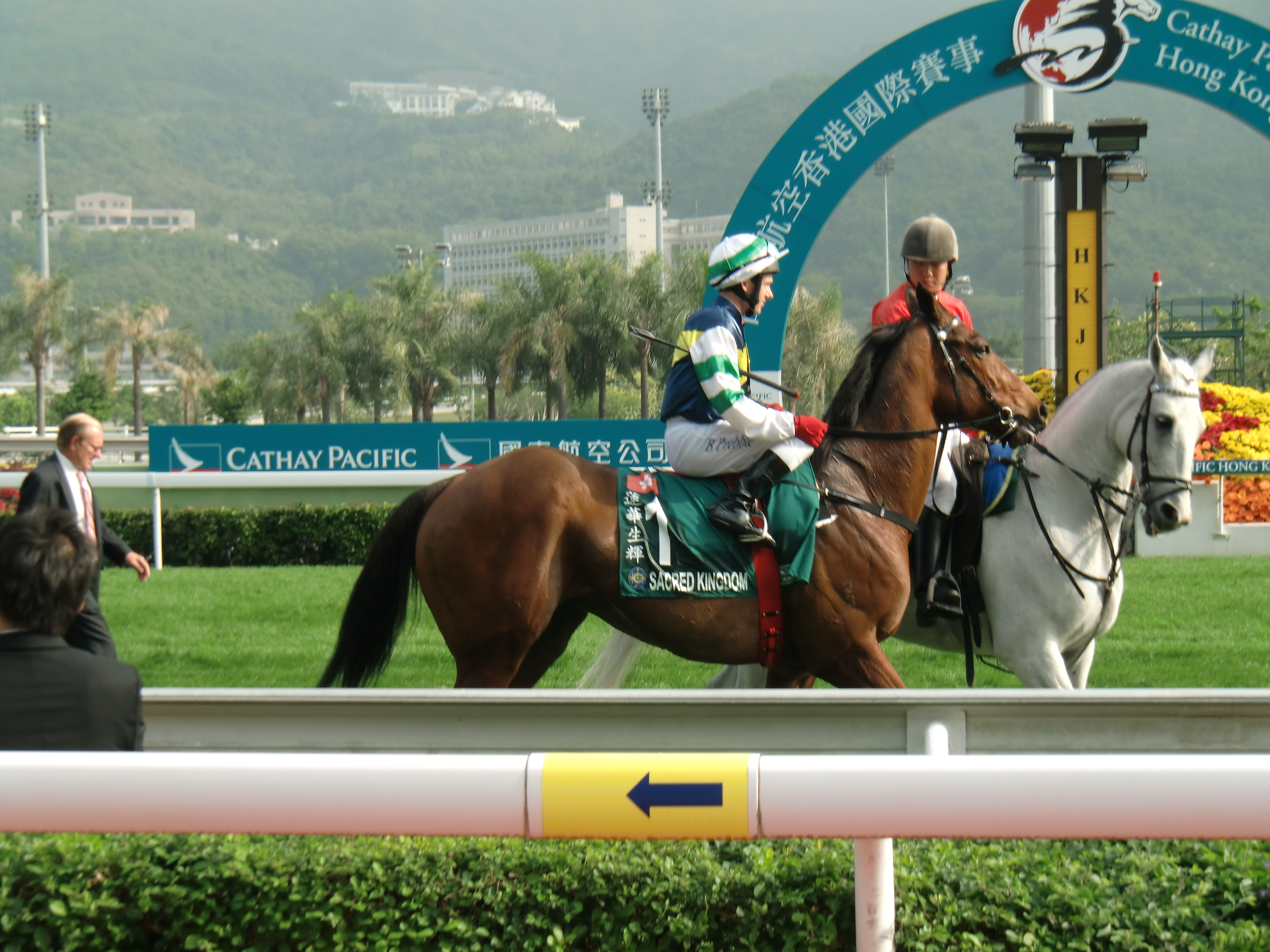
Sacred Kingdom by Encosta De Lago.

- Alinghi (11 wins, $3,563,164, MRC Blue Diamond Stakes, VRC Newmarket Handicap, MRC One Thousand Guineas etc.)
- Chautauqua (13 wins, $8,776,935), TJ Smith Stakes x 3, Manikato Stakes, Lightning Stakes, Chairman's Sprint Prize)
- Count Encosta (STC Myer Stakes)
- De Lago Mist (VRC Sires Produce Stakes)
- Delago Brom (4 wins, $888,500, VRC Australian Guineas, sire of 4 stakes-winners)
- Douro Valley (8 wins, $1,239,258, MRC Yalumba Stakes)
- Dream The Dream (South Australian Oaks)
- English (6 wins, $3,441,071, All Aged Stakes, Doomben 10,000)
- Hanks (MVRC AAMI Vase)
- Lashed (7 wins, $976,714, ARC New Zealand International Stakes, WaikRC International Stakes, ARC Zabeel Classic)
- Manhattan Rain ($1,311,200, AJC Sires Produce Stakes etc.)
- Mnemosyne (6 wins, $1,371,975, STC Queen of the Turf Stakes, MRC One Thousand Guineas etc.)
- Newport (9 wins, $1,210,600, AJC Metropolitan Handicap, Brisbane Cup)
- Northern Meteor (3 wins, $532,480, VRC Coolmore Stud Stakes)
- Our Smoking Joe (10 wins, $1,586,700, MRC St George Stakes)
- Princess Coup (12 wins, $3,651,776, HBRInc Stoney Bridge Stakes, HBRInc Kelt Capital Stakes (twice), WRC New Zealand Oaks)
- Racing To Win (13 wins, $3,762,285, STC George Ryder Stakes, AJC Doncaster Handicap, AJC George Main Stakes, AJC Epsom Handicap, AJC All Aged Stakes)
- Road To Rock (6 wins, $1,153,350, AJC George Main Stakes, AJC Queen Elizabeth Stakes)
- Sacred Kingdom (formerly Jumbo Star) (World Co-Champion Sprinter; 15 wins, $5,632,838, Hong Kong Sprint ( twice), Chairman's Sprint Prize (twice), Singapore International Sprint, Centenary Sprint Cup, Hong Kong Horse of the Year)
- Shadoways (6 wins, $703,900, SAJC Goodwood Handicap)
- Sirmione (4 wins, $1,894,375, VRC Australian Cup, VRC Mackinnon Stakes)
- Titanic Jack (8 wins, $1,288,950, VRC Emirates Stakes, Alister Clark Stakes)

Encosta De Lago's first northern hemisphere bred yearling sold to leading trainer, Bob Baffert at the Fasig-Tipton Saratoga Sale for US$500,000. The stallion has now sired over 1,700 foals in Australia with 950 runners, 619 winners (including about 70 stakes winners) for earnings of A$90 million during his 13 years at stud. He is the sire of winners in Australia, Hong Kong, Ireland, New Zealand, Singapore and South Africa. In 2010, 88 yearlings sired by him were sold at Australian auctions for an average of A$250,000. His stud fee for 2010 is $143,000 including GST, with a free return.

Encosta De Lago was retired from stud duty by Coolmore on 5 February 2015.

In addition Encosta De Lago is the broodmare sire of stakes winners Beneteau, Musir, She's Got Gears and Stokehouse.

He is also the grand sire of Hong Kong champion Beauty Generation (Road To Rock - Stylish Bel, by Bel Esprit).

== Death ==
On 6 October 2018, Coolmore Stud announced that Encosta De Lago had died aged 25 years.

== Pedigree ==
Pedigree of Encosta De Lago (AUS), bay stallion, 1993
Sire Fairy King (USA) B. 1982	Northern Dancer (CAN); B. 1961	Nearctic; 1954	Nearco (ITY)
Sire Fairy King (USA) B. 1982	Northern Dancer (CAN); B. 1961	Nearctic; 1954	Lady Angela (GB)
Sire Fairy King (USA) B. 1982	Northern Dancer (CAN); B. 1961	Natalma (USA); 1957	Native Dancer
Sire Fairy King (USA) B. 1982	Northern Dancer (CAN); B. 1961	Natalma (USA); 1957	Almahmoud
Sire Fairy King (USA) B. 1982	Fairy Bridge; 1975	Bold Reason; 1968	Hail To Reason
Sire Fairy King (USA) B. 1982	Fairy Bridge; 1975	Bold Reason; 1968	Lalun
Sire Fairy King (USA) B. 1982	Fairy Bridge; 1975	Special; 1969	Forli (ARG)
Sire Fairy King (USA) B. 1982	Fairy Bridge; 1975	Special; 1969	Thong
Dam Shoal Creek Ch. 1988	Star Way (GB); 1977	Star Appeal (IRE); 1970	Appiani (ITY)
Dam Shoal Creek Ch. 1988	Star Way (GB); 1977	Star Appeal (IRE); 1970	Sterna (GER)
Dam Shoal Creek Ch. 1988	Star Way (GB); 1977	New Way; 1970	Klairon (FR)
Dam Shoal Creek Ch. 1988	Star Way (GB); 1977	New Way; 1970	New Move (GB)
Dam Shoal Creek Ch. 1988	Rolls (USA); 1984	Mr. Prospector (USA); 1970	Raise A Native
Dam Shoal Creek Ch. 1988	Rolls (USA); 1984	Mr. Prospector (USA); 1970	Gold Digger
Dam Shoal Creek Ch. 1988	Rolls (USA); 1984	Grand Luxe (CAN); 1974	Sir Ivor
Dam Shoal Creek Ch. 1988	Rolls (USA); 1984	Grand Luxe (CAN); 1974	Fanfreluche (Family: 4g)
