= Helissio =

French-bred Thoroughbred racehorse (1993–2013)

- Racing silks of Enrique Sarasola
- Sire: Fairy King
- Grandsire: Northern Dancer
- Dam: Helice
- Damsire: Slewpy
- Sex: Stallion
- Foaled: 1993
- Country: France
- Colour: Bay
- Breeder: Ecurie Skymarc Farm
- Owner: Enrique Sarasola
- Trainer: Élie Lellouche
- Record: 13:8-1-2
- Earnings: $2,210,000

Major wins
- Prix Noailles (1996); Prix Lupin (1996); Grand Prix de Saint-Cloud (1996, 1997); Prix Niel (1996); Prix de l'Arc de Triomphe (1996); Prix Ganay (1997)

Awards
- European 3-Yr-Old Champion Colt (1996); European Horse of the Year (1996); Timeform rating: 136
- Last updated on 1 October 2024

Helissio (1993–2013) was a Thoroughbred racehorse who was European Horse of the Year for 1996. A son of Fairy King by Northern Dancer, he was owned by the Spanish businessman Enrique Sarasola and trained by Élie Lellouche. A seven-time Group One winner, his career highlight was victory in the 1996 Prix de l'Arc de Triomphe at Longchamp by five lengths, which earned him a high Timeform rating of 136. He failed to reproduce that form in the 1997 Arc, finishing well behind the winner Peintre Celebre.

Retired after his four-year-old campaign, Helissio stood at stud at the Widden Stud in Australia and Shadai Stallion Station in Japan. He later stood at The National Stud in Newmarket, England, Larkinglass Farm and Park House Stud. He sired: Helenus, a top class Australian three-year-old stayer; the brilliant Japanese horse Pop Rock; and Weekend Beauty, the dam of six-time Group One winner Weekend Hussler.

Helissio died of a heart attack at Scarvagh House Stud in Ireland on 8 October 2013.
