= 1993 Epsom Derby =

- Location: Epsom Downs Racecourse
- Date: 2 June 1993
- Winning horse: Commander in Chief
- Starting price: 15/2
- Jockey: Michael Kinane
- Trainer: Henry Cecil
- Owner: Khalid ibn Abdullah

Epsom Derby 1993
1-2-3
Commander In Chief	Blue Judge	Blues Traveller

Also Ran
4-5-6
Cairo Prince	Barathea	Bob's Return
7-8-9
Redenham	Wolf Prince	Fatherland
10-11-12
Tenby	Desert Team	Planetary Aspect
13-14-15
Geisway	Canaska Star	Shareek
16
Zind	16 Ran	2m 34.51s

The 1993 Epsom Derby was a horse race which took place at Epsom Downs on Wednesday 2 June 1993. It was the 214th running of the Derby, and it was won by Commander in Chief. The winner was ridden by Michael Kinane and trained by Henry Cecil. The pre-race favourite Tenby finished tenth.

== Race details ==
- Sponsor: Ever Ready
- Winner's prize money: £447,580
- Going: Good
- Number of runners: 16
- Winner's time: 2m 34.51s

Winner's racing colours

== Full result ==
	*	Horse	Jockey	Trainer ^{†}	SP
1		Commander in Chief	Michael Kinane	Henry Cecil	15/2
2	3½	Blue Judge	Bruce Raymond	Jim Bolger (IRE)	150/1
3	2½	Blues Traveller	Darryll Holland	Barry Hills	150/1
4	3	Cairo Prince	Willie Carson	Peter Chapple-Hyam	50/1
5	shd	Barathea	Michael Roberts	Luca Cumani	11/1
6	5	Bob's Return	Philip Robinson	Mark Tompkins	15/1
7	nk	Redenham	Richard Quinn	Richard Hannon, Sr.	150/1
8	7	Wolf Prince	Frankie Dettori	Michael Dickinson (USA)	40/1
9	nk	Fatherland	Lester Piggott	Vincent O'Brien (IRE)	8/1
10	1	Tenby	Pat Eddery	Henry Cecil	4/5 fav
11	nk	Desert Team	Christy Roche	Jim Bolger (IRE)	25/1
12	2½	Planetary Aspect	John Reid	Peter Chapple-Hyam	16/1
13	½	Geisway	Cash Asmussen	Richard Hannon, Sr.	25/1
14	1½	Canaska Star	Alan Munro	Paul Kelleway	200/1
15	¾	Shareek	Walter Swinburn	Michael Stoute	40/1
16	15	Zind	Ray Cochrane	Peter Chapple-Hyam	150/1

* The distances between the horses are shown in lengths or shorter. shd = short-head; nk = neck.
† Trainers are based in Great Britain unless indicated.

== Winner's details ==
Further details of the winner, Commander in Chief:

- Foaled: 18 May 1990 in Great Britain
- Sire: Dancing Brave; Dam: Slightly Dangerous (Roberto)
- Owner: Khalid Abdullah
- Breeder: Juddmonte Farms
- Rating in 1993 International Classifications: 127

== Form analysis ==
=== Two-year-old races ===
Notable runs by the future Derby participants as two-year-olds in 1992.

- Blues Traveller – 8th Dewhurst Stakes
- Bob's Return – 1st Zetland Stakes
- Redenham – 7th Racing Post Trophy
- Fatherland – 1st Tyros Stakes, 1st Futurity Stakes, 1st National Stakes, 5th Dewhurst Stakes
- Tenby – 1st Washington Singer Stakes, 1st Grand Critérium
- Desert Team – 2nd Eyrefield Stakes
- Planetary Aspect – 5th Royal Lodge Stakes
- Geisway – 5th Coventry Stakes, 4th Superlative Stakes, 2nd Royal Lodge Stakes
- Canaska Star – 6th Coventry Stakes, 2nd July Stakes, 2nd Richmond Stakes, 4th Prix de la Salamandre, 7th Grand Critérium
- Zind – 7th Dewhurst Stakes, 3rd Racing Post Trophy

=== The road to Epsom ===
Early-season appearances in 1993 and trial races prior to running in the Derby.

- Commander in Chief – 1st Glasgow Stakes, 1st Culford Stakes (1m4f cond race Nmkt 2000 guineas day Oakmead 2nd.)
- Blue Judge - 3rd Culford Stakes
- Blues Traveller – 4th Thirsk Classic Trial, 2nd Dee Stakes
- Cairo Prince – 4th Chester Vase
- Barathea – 4th Craven Stakes, 2nd 2,000 Guineas, 1st Irish 2,000 Guineas
- Bob's Return – 1st Lingfield Derby Trial
- Redenham – 8th Craven Stakes, 4th Sandown Classic Trial
- Fatherland – 2nd Leopardstown 2,000 Guineas Trial Stakes, 2nd Irish 2,000 Guineas
- Tenby – 1st Newmarket Stakes, 1st Dante Stakes
- Desert Team – 2nd Feilden Stakes, 3rd Newmarket Stakes
- Planetary Aspect – 2nd Newmarket Stakes, 2nd Dante Stakes
- Geisway – 1st Predominate Stakes
- Canaska Star – 9th Craven Stakes, 5th Predominate Stakes
- Shareek – 3rd Lingfield Derby Trial
- Zind – 2nd White Rose Stakes, 6th Lingfield Derby Trial

=== Subsequent Group 1 wins ===
Group 1 / Grade I victories after running in the Derby.

- Commander in Chief – Irish Derby (1993)
- Barathea – Breeders' Cup Mile (1994)
- Bob's Return – St. Leger (1993)

== Subsequent breeding careers ==
Leading progeny of participants in the 1993 Epsom Derby.

=== Sires of Group/Grade One winners ===
Barathea (5th)

- Tobougg - Champion Two-year-old Colt (2000), 3rd Epsom Derby (2001)
- Tante Rose - 1st Haydock Sprint Cup (2004)
- Magical Romance - 1st Cheveley Park Stakes (2004)
- Overturn - 1st Fighting Fifth Hurdle (2011)

Blues Traveller (3rd) - Exported to New Zealand before finishing stud career in Ireland

- Giovana - 1st Queensland Oaks (2000)
- Bohemian Blues - Dam of Shamrocker (1st Australian Guineas 2011) and Rock Diva (1st Auckland Cup 2015)

=== Sires of National Hunt horses ===
Bob's Return (6th)

- Joncol - 1st John Durkan Memorial Punchestown Chase (2009), 1st Hennessy Gold Cup (2010)
- Oneway - 3rd Tingle Creek Chase (2005, 2006)
- Across The Bay - 1st Rendlesham Hurdle (2013)
- Annalecky - Dam of Black Hercules (1st Golden Miller Novices' Chase 2016)

=== Other Stallions ===
Commander In Chief (1st) - Ein Bride (1st Hanshin Sansai Himba Stakes 1997), Rascal Suzuka (2nd Tenno Sho 2000), Damsire of Little Amapola (Champion Japanese Three-Year-Old Filly 2008)
Tenby (10th) - Sun Zeppelin (2nd Satsuki Shō 2007), Carry The Flag (3rd Singapore Airlines International Cup 2000), Mirjan (1st Northumberland Plate 2004)
Blue Judge (2nd) - Exported to Saudi Arabia
Wolf Prince (8th) - Exported to America
Desert Team (11th) - Exported to South Africa
Planetary Aspect (12th) - Exported to Saudi Arabia
