= Mac Swiney =

Irish-bred Thoroughbred racehorse

- Racing silks of Mrs J S Bolger
- Sire: New Approach
- Grandsire: Galileo
- Dam: Halla Na Saoire
- Damsire: Teofilo
- Sex: Colt
- Foaled: 23 February 2018
- Country: Ireland
- Colour: Chestnut
- Breeder: Jim Bolger
- Owner: Jackie Bolger
- Trainer: Jim Bolger
- Record: 13: 4-0-1
- Earnings: £621,336

Major wins
- Futurity Stakes (2020); Vertem Futurity Trophy (2020); Irish 2,000 Guineas (2021)

Mac Swiney (foaled 23 February 2018) is an Irish Thoroughbred racehorse. He was one of the leading juvenile colts in Europe in 2020 when he won three of his six races including the Futurity Stakes in Ireland and the Vertem Futurity Trophy in Britain. In 2021 he won the Irish 2,000 Guineas and finished fourth in the Epsom Derby.

== Background ==
Mac Swiney is a chestnut horse with a white blaze and a white sock on his left hind led bred in Ireland by Jim Bolger. He races in the colours of Bolger's wife Jackie and is trained by Bolger at Coolcullen in County Carlow. The horse was named after the Irish playwright, author and politician Terence MacSwiney.

He was from the eighth crop of foals sired by New Approach, who won the Epsom Derby and Champion Stakes in 2008. His other foals have included Masar, Dawn Approach and Talent. Mac Swiney's dam Halla Na Saoire was an unraced sister to the Derrinstown Stud Derby Trial winner Light Heavy. As a descendant of the French broodmare Evisa, she was related to many good winners including Estimate, Enzeli and Ebadiyla.

== Racing career ==
=== 2020: two-year-old season ===
Mac Swiney was ridden in all of his races as a two-year-old by Kevin Manning, who is married to Jim Bolger's daughter Una. The colt began his racing career by finishing fifth in a maiden race over seven furlongs at the Curragh on 28 June. In the following month, he started at odds of 15/2 for a maiden over the same course and distance and recorded his first success as he overtook the Aidan O'Brien-trained favourite Wembley inside the final furlongs and pulled clear to win by one and a half lengths. On 6 August, the colt was stepped up in class to contest the Group 3 Tyros Stakes at Leopardstown Racecourse but made little impact as he faded from contention in the last quarter mile and came home ninth of the ten runners behind Military Style. Despite his poor run at Leopardstown, Mac Swiney was moved up in class again to contest the Group 2 Futurity Stakes over seven furlong on soft ground at the Curragh sixteen days later. The highly regarded maiden winner Cadillac started favourite ahead of Van Gogh with Mac Swiney starting a 28/1 outsider in an eight-runner field. After racing in second place behind the front-running Ontario, he stayed on well in the closing stages, gained the advantage in the final strides and won by half a length from Cadillac. After the race, Una Manning said, "We're delighted with that run. He did it well on ground he wouldn't really appreciate... When he won here the last time Dad thought he was his Derby horse. We're very pleased with him, he was very good. It seemed to be a strong race today."

Mac Swiney was elevated to the highest class for the Group 1 National Stakes at the Curragh on 13 September but never looked likely to win and came home eighth, beaten just over eight lengths by the winner Thunder Moon. On 24 October. the colt was sent to England for the Group 1 Vertem Futurity Trophy over one mile on heavy ground at Doncaster Racecourse. The Autumn Stakes winner One Ruler started favourite while Mac Swiney (the only other Group race winner involved) went off at odds of 12/1 in an eight-runner field. Mac Swiney tracked the leaders as Cobh set the pace before moving up to dispute the lead in the last quarter mile, gaining the advantage in the closing stages and winning by three quarters of a length from One Ruler. Jim Bolger, who was winning his first Group 1 for more than three years, said, “I've been regarding him as my Derby horse since he first went to the races, and after today that opinion is not about to change." Commenting on the connection between the horse and the man after whom he was named, he added, "I must have known he was good back in January when I called him Mac Swiney because it wouldn't have been good for me or anyone around here to name a horse after a Cork man which wasn't capable of delivering, especially such an important Cork man. He was one of our outstanding patriots, and I'm thrilled for his memory and his extended family of today that this horse was able to go back to 100 years after his death and win like he did."

In the official European classification of for 2020, Mac Swiney was given a rating of 116, making him the fifth best two-year-old of the season, four pounds behind the top-rated St Mark's Basilica.

=== 2021: three-year-old season ===
On his first appearance as a three-year-old Mac Swiney started 100/30 second favourite for the Group 3 Derrinstown Stud Derby Trial over ten furlongs at Leopardstown on 9 May, but after reaching second place in the straight he appeared to be outpaced in the closing stages and finished fourth behind Bolshoi Ballet, beaten almost seven lengths by the winner. Two weeks later the colt was dropped back in distance for the Irish 2000 Guineas at the Curragh when he started at odds of 8/1 and was ridden by Rory Cleary as Manning rode the stable's 2000 Guineas winner Poetic Flare. Lucky Vega started favourite while the other eight runners included Van Gogh, Wembley and La Barrosa (Somerville Tattersall Stakes). In a race run in heavy rain Mac Swiney led from the start and held off a sustained challenge from his stablemate Poetic Flare to win by a short head with a gap of 3 1/2 lengths back to Van Gogh in third. After the race Cleary said "The further we went, the better he was going under me, and he stayed at it so well. I think the ground, with it being a bit on the wet side, his stamina really came into play. He’s so honest – I just can’t believe I’m after winning the Guineas... My lad really just stuck his head out for me. I think somebody was looking down on me because they made it easy for me."

On 5 June Mac Swiney was one of eleven colts to contest the 242nd running of the Derby over 1 1/2 miles at Epsom Racecourse and went off the 8/1 third choice in the betting. He started slowly and despite making steady progress in the straight he never looked likely to win and came home fourth behind Adayar, Mojo Star and Hurricane Lane. In the Irish Derby at the Curragh three weeks later he was disappointing, reaching second place in the straight before fading in the last quarter mile to finish sixth of the eleven runners behind Hurricane Lane. At York Racecourse in August the colt was matched against older horses in the International Stakes over 10 1/2 furlongs but after leading for most of the race he was overtaken early in the straight and came home fifth behind the four-year-old Mishriff, beaten more than eight lengths by the winner.

On 11 September at Leopardstown Mac Swiney was dropped in class and distance for the Group 2 Clipper Boomerang Mile in which he started 7/2 favourite but faded badly in the closing stages and finished unplaced. On his final run of the year, Mac Swinney went off a 40/1 outsider for the Champion Stakes at Ascot Racecourse on 16 October. After racing towards the rear of the field he stayed on strongly in the straight to take third place behind Sealiway and Dubai Honour with Mishriff, Adayar and Addeybb finishing behind.

== Pedigree ==
Pedigree of Mac Swiney (IRE), chestnut colt, 2018
Sire New Approach (IRE) 2005	Galileo* (IRE); 1998	Sadler's Wells* (USA)	Northern Dancer (CAN)
Sire New Approach (IRE) 2005	Galileo* (IRE); 1998	Sadler's Wells* (USA)	Fairy Bridge
Sire New Approach (IRE) 2005	Galileo* (IRE); 1998	Urban Sea* (USA)	Miswaki
Sire New Approach (IRE) 2005	Galileo* (IRE); 1998	Urban Sea* (USA)	Allegretta (GB)
Sire New Approach (IRE) 2005	Park Express (IRE); 1983	Ahonoora (GB)	Lorenzaccio
Sire New Approach (IRE) 2005	Park Express (IRE); 1983	Ahonoora (GB)	Helen Nichols
Sire New Approach (IRE) 2005	Park Express (IRE); 1983	Matcher (CAN)	Match (FR)
Sire New Approach (IRE) 2005	Park Express (IRE); 1983	Matcher (CAN)	Lachine (GB)
Dam Halla Na Saoire (IRE) 2010	Teofilo (IRE); 2004	Galileo*	Sadler's Wells* (USA)
Dam Halla Na Saoire (IRE) 2010	Teofilo (IRE); 2004	Galileo*	Urban Sea* (USA)
Dam Halla Na Saoire (IRE) 2010	Teofilo (IRE); 2004	Speirbhean	Danehill (USA)
Dam Halla Na Saoire (IRE) 2010	Teofilo (IRE); 2004	Speirbhean	Saviour (USA)
Dam Halla Na Saoire (IRE) 2010	Siamsa (USA); 1997	Quest For Fame (GB)	Rainbow Quest (USA)
Dam Halla Na Saoire (IRE) 2010	Siamsa (USA); 1997	Quest For Fame (GB)	Aryenne (FR)
Dam Halla Na Saoire (IRE) 2010	Siamsa (USA); 1997	Amoura	Northfields
Dam Halla Na Saoire (IRE) 2010	Siamsa (USA); 1997	Amoura	Visala (FR) (Family: 13-c)

* Mac Swiney is inbred 2S x 3D to the stallion Galileo, meaning that he appears second generation on the sire side of his pedigree and third on the dam side of his pedigree.
