= Fatherland (horse) =

Irish-bred Thoroughbred racehorse

- Sire: Sadler's Wells
- Grandsire: Northern Dancer
- Dam: Lisadell
- Damsire: Forli
- Sex: Colt
- Foaled: 27 February 1990
- Country: Ireland
- Colour: Bay
- Breeder: Ballydoyle Stud
- Owner: Jacqueline O'Brien; Robert B. Lewis
- Trainer: Vincent O'Brien; Gary F. Jones
- Record: 11: 4-2-0
- Earnings: £189,588

Major wins
- Tyros Stakes (1992); Futurity Stakes (1992); National Stakes (1992)

Fatherland (27 February 1990 – November 1993) was an Irish-bred Thoroughbred racehorse. He was one of the best Irish two-year-olds of 1992, when he won four races including the Tyros Stakes, Futurity Stakes and National Stakes. In 1993 he was beaten in his first four starts although he did finish a close second in the Irish 2000 Guineas. In autumn he was sent to race in the United States where he was fatally injured in the Hollywood Derby in November.

== Background ==
Fatherland was a bay colt bred at the Ballydoyle Stud in County Tipperary and trained by stud's founder and owner Vincent O'Brien. During his racing career Fatherland carried the colours of O'Brien's wife, the writer and photographer Jacqueline O'Brien. He was ridden in all but one of his European starts by Lester Piggott.

He was from the fifth crop of foals sired by Sadler's Wells, who won the Irish 2000 Guineas, Eclipse Stakes and Irish Champion Stakes in 1984 went on to be the Champion sire on fourteen occasions. Fatherland's dam Lisadell was a Kentucky-bred mare who was trained by O'Brien in Ireland and won the Coronation Stakes at Royal Ascot in 1974. She was a full-sister to both Thatch and to Special, whose descendants include Sadler's Wells and Nureyev. Lisadell herself was the female-line ancestor of El Condor Pasa, Gossamer and Bachelor Duke.

== Racing career ==
=== 1992: two-year-old season ===
On his first appearance Fatherland started 5/4 favourite for a maiden race over seven furlongs at Leopardstown Racecourseon 25 July in which he was ridden and Pat Gilson he won by a length from the Jim Bolger Scribe. Piggott took over the ride on 15 August when the colt was stepped up in class for the Listed Tyros Stakes over the same distance at the Curragh. Starting the 4/6 favourite he came home one and a half lengths clear of Frenchpark, a colt who went on to win the Beresford Stakes later that year. Two weeks later, over the same course and distance, he took the Group 3 Futurity Stakes at odds of 4/7, beating the British challenger Newton's Law by one and a half lengths.

At the Curragh on 19 September Fatherland was made the 4/5 favourite for the Group 1 National Stakes. The best fancied of his opponents was the British challenger Maroof whilst the other three runners were Ivory Frontier (winner of the Railway Stakes), Khoraz (from the John Oxx stable) and the 25/1 outsider Rondelli. Piggott restrained the colt at the rear of the field as Maroof set the pace, before making progress in the last quarter mile. He caught Maroof 50 yards from the finish and won by half a length.

On his last run of 1992 Fatherland was sent to England for the Dewhurst Stakes at Newmarket in October. He was made the 5/1 second choice in an eleven-runner field, but never looked likely to win and finished fifth behind the French-trained Zafonic.

=== 1993: three-year-old season ===
Fatherland began his second season by finishing second to Massyar on the Leopardstown 2,000 Guineas Trial on 17 April, conceding seven pounds to the winner. In the Irish 2000 Guineas at the Curragh on 15 May he started at odds of 11/2 in an eleven-runners field and produced what was probably his best performance. After being restrained towards the rear by Piggott he produced a strong late but went down by a head to the British-trained favourite Barathea. When moved up in distance for the 1993 Epsom Derby over one and a half miles on 2 June he was made the 8/1 third choice in the betting but made no impact in the race, coming home ninth of the sixteen runners, more than twenty lengths behind the winner Commander in Chief. The colt was equipped with blinkers when he was sent to France in July and finished fourth to Revelation in the Prix Eugène Adam over 2000 metres at Saint-Cloud Racecourse.

After the Prix Eugène Adam, Fatherland was sent to race in California where he entered the ownership of Robert B. Lewis and joined the training stable of Gary F. Jones. On his American debut he was ridden by Eddie Delahoussaye and started favourite for the Grade II Del Mar Derby on 6 September. He was last of the twelve runners for most of the way before producing a strong late run to finish fifth, beaten just over two lengths by the winner Guide. Adalberto Lopez took the ride when Fatherland was moved up to Grade I class for the Hollywood Derby on 20 November. After running half a mile the colt was towards the rear of the field when he broke down injured and was pulled up by his jockey. A veterinary examination revealed a "shattered" pastern and he was immediately euthanised.

== Pedigree ==
Pedigree of Fatherland (IRE) bay colt 1990
Sire Sadler's Wells (USA) 1981	Northern Dancer (CAN); 1961	Nearctic	Nearco
Sire Sadler's Wells (USA) 1981	Northern Dancer (CAN); 1961	Nearctic	Lady Angela
Sire Sadler's Wells (USA) 1981	Northern Dancer (CAN); 1961	Natalma	Native Dancer
Sire Sadler's Wells (USA) 1981	Northern Dancer (CAN); 1961	Natalma	Almahmoud
Sire Sadler's Wells (USA) 1981	Fairy Bridge (USA); 1975	Bold Reason	Hail to Reason
Sire Sadler's Wells (USA) 1981	Fairy Bridge (USA); 1975	Bold Reason	Lalun
Sire Sadler's Wells (USA) 1981	Fairy Bridge (USA); 1975	Special	Forli
Sire Sadler's Wells (USA) 1981	Fairy Bridge (USA); 1975	Special	Thong
Dam Lisadell (USA) 1971	Forli (ARG); 1963	Aristophanes	Hyperion
Dam Lisadell (USA) 1971	Forli (ARG); 1963	Aristophanes	Commotion
Dam Lisadell (USA) 1971	Forli (ARG); 1963	Trevisa	Advocate
Dam Lisadell (USA) 1971	Forli (ARG); 1963	Trevisa	Veneta
Dam Lisadell (USA) 1971	Thong (USA); 1964	Nantallah	Nasrullah
Dam Lisadell (USA) 1971	Thong (USA); 1964	Nantallah	Shimmer
Dam Lisadell (USA) 1971	Thong (USA); 1964	Rough Shod	Gold Bridge
Dam Lisadell (USA) 1971	Thong (USA); 1964	Rough Shod	Dalmary (family: 5-h)

- Fatherland was inbred 2 × 4 to Forli and Thong, meaning that these horses appear in both the second and fourth generations of his pedigree.
