= 2013 2000 Guineas Stakes =

2003 British Horse Race

- 2000 Guineas Stakes
- Racing colours of the winner
- Location: Newmarket Racecourse
- Date: 4 May 2013
- Winning horse: Dawn Approach
- Starting price: 11/8 fav
- Jockey: Kevin Manning
- Trainer: Jim Bolger
- Owner: Godolphin
- Conditions: Good to firm

The 2013 2000 Guineas Stakes was the 205th running of the 2000 Guineas Stakes horse race. It was run over one mile at Newmarket Racecourse on 4 May 2013.

== Race details ==
- Sponsor: QIPCO
- Winner's prize money: £226,840
- Going: Good to firm
- Number of runners: 13
- Winner's time: 1 minute, 35.84 seconds

== Full result ==
| | Dist * | Horse | Jockey | Trainer | SP |
| 1 | | Dawn Approach | Kevin Manning | Jim Bolger | 11/8 fav |
| 2 | 5 | Glory Awaits | Jamie Spencer | Kevin Ryan | 150/1 |
| 3 | 2¼ | Van Der Neer | William Buick | Richard Hannon Sr. | 20/1 |
| 4 | nk | Toronado | Richard Hughes | Richard Hannon Sr. | 11/4 |
| 5 | ¾ | Cristoforo Colombo | Joseph O'Brien | Aidan O'Brien | 10/1 |
| 6 | ½ | Mars | Seamie Heffernan | Aidan O'Brien | 9/1 |
| 7 | ¾ | Garswood | Tony Hamilton | Richard Fahey | 12/1 |
| 8 | ½ | Don't Bother Me | Martin Harley | Niall Moran | 100/1 |
| 9 | 2½ | Leitir Mor | Ronan Whelan | Jim Bolger | 50/1 |
| 10 | 2¼ | George Vancouver | Colm O'Donoghue | Aidan O'Brien | 20/1 |
| 11 | nk | Correspondent | Paul Hanagan | Brian Meehan | 150/1 |
| 12 | 7 | Moohaajim | Adam Kirby | Marco Botti | 20/1 |
| 13 | 4½ | Kyllachy Rise | Tom Queally | Sir Henry Cecil | 50/1 |

* The distances between the horses are shown in lengths or shorter – nk = neck

== Winner details ==
Further details of the winner, Dawn Approach:

- Foaled: 23 April 2010, in Ireland
- Sire: New Approach; Dam: Hymn Of The Dawn (Phone Trick)
- Owner: Godolphin
- Breeder: Jim Bolger

== Reaction ==
Dawn Approach's jockey Kevin Manning said after the race: "He's a very special horse. He's done it very easy and travelled very well throughout the race." When asked about whether the colt would run in the Derby, Jim Bolger said: "He's got a fantastic temperament. He was cruising here and he's very easy to switch off in a race. If he's going to get the trip, he's got the temperament for it" and added "I don't know about the Derby, Sheikh Mohammed and myself said we would sleep on it and take it from there."

== Form analysis ==
=== Two-year-old races ===
Notable runs by the future 2000 Guineas participants as two-year-olds in 2012:

- Dawn Approach – 1st in Coventry Stakes, Vincent O'Brien Stakes and Dewhurst Stakes
- Glory Awaits – 9th in Superlative Stakes, 4th in Autumn Stakes
- Van Der Neer – 2nd in Dewhurst Stakes
- Toronado – 1st in Winkfield Stakes and Champagne Stakes
- Cristoforo Colombo – 3rd in Coventry Stakes, 2nd in Railway Stakes, slipped up in Phoenix Stakes, 4th in Middle Park Stakes
- Garswood – 1st in Harry Rosebery Stakes, 2nd in Cornwallis Stakes
- Don't Bother Me – 6th in Solario Stakes, 5th in Killavullan Stakes
- Leitir Mor – 7th in Coventry Stakes, 2nd in Phoenix Stakes, 3rd in Curragh Stakes, 1st in Round Tower Stakes, 3rd in Vincent O'Brien Stakes, 2nd in Dewhurst Stakes
- George Vancouver – 2nd in Prix Morny, 6th in Round Tower Stakes, 3rd in Dewhurst Stakes, 1st in Breeders' Cup Juvenile Turf
- Moohaajim – 5th in Prix Morny, 1st in Mill Reef Stakes, 2nd in Middle Park Stakes

=== The road to Newmarket ===
Early-season appearances in 2013, prior to running in the 2000 Guineas:

- Glory Awaits – 4th in Feilden Stakes
- Van Der Neer – 1st in International Trial Stakes
- Toronado – 1st in Craven Stakes
- Garswood – 1st in European Free Handicap
- Don't Bother Me – 2nd in Patton Stakes, 2nd in Leopardstown 2,000 Guineas Trial Stakes
- Leitir Mor – 6th in Woodlands Stakes
- Correspondent – 4th in Greenham Stakes
- Moohaajim – 3rd in Greenham Stakes

=== Subsequent Group 1 wins ===
Group 1 / Grade I victories after running in the 2000 Guineas:

- Dawn Approach – St James's Palace Stakes (2013)
- Toronado – Sussex Stakes (2013)

== Subsequent breeding careers ==
Leading progeny of participants in the 2013 2000 Guineas.

Dawn Approach (1st) – Musis Amica (2nd Prix De Diane 2018), Mary Tudor (3rd Irish Oaks 2018), Madhmoon (2nd Epsom Derby 2019)
Toronado (4th) – Tactical (1st July Stakes 2020), Affair To Remember (3rd Australasian Oaks 2020)
Garswood (7th) – Cala Tarida (1st Prix des Réservoirs 2018), Little Kim (1st Prix du Bois 2018)
Don't Bother Me (8th) – Exported to Australia
Leitir Mor (9th) – Exported to India
George Vancouver (10th) – Sired minor flat and jumps winners
Moohaajim (12th) – Minor flat winners, exported to Denmark
