= Poetic Flare =

Irish Thoroughbred racehorse

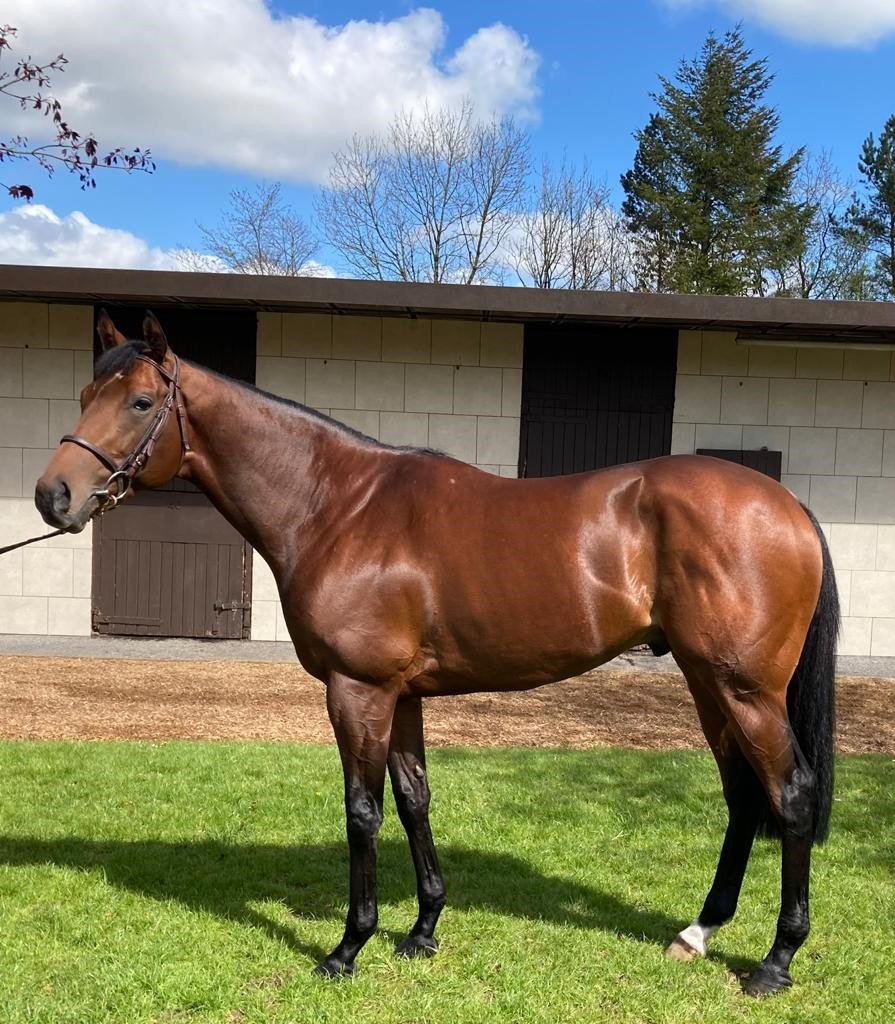
- Sire: Dawn Approach
- Grandsire: New Approach
- Dam: Maria Lee
- Damsire: Rock of Gibraltar
- Sex: Colt
- Foaled: 26 March 2018
- Country: Ireland
- Colour: Bay
- Breeder: Jim Bolger
- Owner: Jackie Bolger
- Trainer: Jim Bolger
- Record: 10: 5-3-0
- Earnings: £968,106

Major wins
- Killavullan Stakes (2020); 2,000 Guineas Trial Stakes (2021); 2000 Guineas (2021); St James's Palace Stakes (2021)

Poetic Flare (foaled 26 March 2018) is an Irish Thoroughbred racehorse. He showed promise as a two-year-old in 2020 when he won two of his three races including the Killavullan Stakes. He won the Leopardstown 2,000 Guineas Trial Stakes on his first run of 2021 and then took the 2000 Guineas. He was narrowly beaten in the Irish 2000 Guineas but then took the St James's Palace Stakes at Royal Ascot.

== Background ==
Poetic Flare is a bay colt with a white sock on his right hind leg bred in Ireland by Jim Bolger. He was taken into training with by Bolger and races in the colours of his trainer's wife Jackie.

He was from the fourth crop of foals sired by Dawn Approach who was trained by Bolger to win the National Stakes, Dewhurst Stakes, 2000 Guineas and St James's Palace Stakes. The best of his other progeny have included the Epsom Derby runner-up Madhmoon. Poetic Flare's dam Maria Lee showed no racing ability, finishing unplaced on her only start, but did better as a broodmare, producing several other winners including the Zetland Stakes winner Glamorous Approach. Her dam, Elida, was a half-sister to the dam of Teofilo.

== Racing career ==
=== 2020: two-year-old season ===
Poetic Flare was ridden in all of his races as a two-year-old by Kevin Manning, the husband of Jim Bolger's daughter Una. The colt made his debut in a five furlong maiden race on soft to heavy ground at Naas Racecourse on 23 March. Starting the 2/1 joint-favourite in a seven-runner field he started slowly but took the lead inside the final furlong and "kept on well" to win by half a length from the Aidan O'Brien-trained Lipizzaner. He was off the course for more than six months before being sent to England to contest the Group 1 Dewhurst Stakes at Newmarket Racecourse on 10 October when he started a 25/1 outsider and came home tenth of the fourteen runners behind St Mark's Basilica. A week later he went off the 3/1 second favourite for the Group 3 Killavullan Stakes over seven furlongs at Leopardstown Racecourse. He disputed the lead from the start and drew away from his opponents to win "comfortably" by two and a half lengths. After the race Kevin Manning said: "He ran well in the Dewhurst and was only beaten eight lengths. He would have come on plenty from the run and it was a good training performance to turn around a week later. He stays well, but he has plenty of pace... He has a lovely attitude and is a nice horse going forward."

=== 2021: three-year-old season ===
==== Spring ====
On his first appearance as a three-year-old, Poetic Flare started at odds of 3/1 for the Listed 2,000 Guineas Trial Stakes over seven furlongs on good ground at Leopardstown on 11 April. The colt was settled by Manning behind the front-running Snapraeterea before going to the front approaching the final furlong and won by one and a half lengths from the Jessica Harrington-trained Ace Aussie. After the race Una Manning said "We were confident he wouldn't have any problems handling the ground. Last year we just had to play the cards we were dealt and he had to run on soft ground, but he's not ground dependent. He's in both Guineas along with Mac Swiney. We haven't decided yet whether he'll go to Newmarket or the Curragh, but the two of them won't run in the same race."

On his next start, Poetic Flare was sent to England for the second time to contest the 2000 Guineas over the Rowley Mile at Newmarket on 1 May and started a 16/1 outsider. The Vintage Stakes winner Battleground started favourite, while the other twelve runners included Thunder Moon, Van Gogh, Lucky Vega, One Ruler (Autumn Stakes), Chindit (Greenham Stakes) and Master of The Seas (Craven Stakes). Poetic Flare started well and raced just behind the leaders as the outsider Naval Crown set the pace, before moving up to gain the advantage approaching the final furlong. In a closely-contested finish he prevailed by a short head and a neck from Master of the Seas and Lucky Vega. Jim Bolger commented "I bred him, I bred the dam and the sire, the whole lot. And I also bred his second and third dams, so they’ve been around here a long time. He has a marvellous temperament, a wonderful turn of foot, you can put him anywhere in a race, he goes on any ground and he has the looks to go with it. In his short career, he’s been delivering and I’m sure he’ll keep on delivering. After he won his maiden and because of the lockdown, we put him on the easy list and almost immediately he began to grow. He grew two inches between then and July. I’ve never seen a horse grow like that, and growth takes precedence over performance with racehorses, so we had to go easy on him." He also described Poetic Flare as "the most complete racehorse I’ve ever had".

On 16 May Poetic Flare was sent to France for the Poule d'Essai des Poulains (the French equivalent of the 2000 Guineas) over 1600 metres at Longchamp Racecourse and started favourite but after appearing to be outpaced in the closing stages he came home sixth behind his compatriot St Mark's Basilica, beaten just over two lengths by the winner. Six days later he ran in the Irish 2000 Guineas at the Curragh when he failed by a short head to reel in his front-running stablemate Mac Swiney.

==== Summer ====
At Royal Ascot on 15 June Poetic Flare started 7/2 favourite for the St James's Palace Stakes in a thirteen-runner field which also included Lucky Vega, Thunder Moon, Chindit, Battleground, Highland Avenue (Feilden Stakes), Mostahdaf (Heron Stakes) and La Barrosa (Somerville Tattersall Stakes). He settled behind the leaders as Ontario set the pace before moving up to gain the advantage entering the last quarter mile. Poetic Flare drew right away from his opponents in the closing stages and won in "impressive" style by four and a quarter lengths from Lucky Vega. Jim Bolger commented "I have to admit, genuinely, that I was expecting a performance like that. I would have taken anything but that's what I expected, as he'd improved so much and he was so well. He's exceptional, I haven't had one that could take everything that he's taken. I couldn't make him hardy if he didn't have it in the genes, but obviously it's in the genes and we recognised that and we were able to get the very best out."

On 28 July at Goodwood Racecourse Poetic Flare was matched against older horses in the Sussex Stakes at Goodwood Racecourse and started the 11/8 favourite in a nine-runner field. After tracking the leaders he took the lead in the straight but was overtaken in the closing stages and beaten into second place by the filly Alcohol Free. The colt was then sent to France for the Prix Jacques le Marois over 1600 metres at Deauville Racecourse on 15 August. Starting the 3.1/1 second choice in the betting he went to the front approaching the last 200 metres but was beaten a neck by the four-year-old Palace Pier.

== Pedigree ==
Pedigree of Poetic Flare (IRE), bay colt, 2018
Sire Dawn Approach (IRE) 2010	New Approach (IRE); 2005	Galileo	Sadler's Wells (USA)
Sire Dawn Approach (IRE) 2010	New Approach (IRE); 2005	Galileo	Urban Sea (USA)
Sire Dawn Approach (IRE) 2010	New Approach (IRE); 2005	Park Express	Ahonoora (GB)
Sire Dawn Approach (IRE) 2010	New Approach (IRE); 2005	Park Express	Matcher (CAN)
Sire Dawn Approach (IRE) 2010	Hymn of the Dawn (USA); 1999	Phone Trick	Clever Trick
Sire Dawn Approach (IRE) 2010	Hymn of the Dawn (USA); 1999	Phone Trick	Over The Phone
Sire Dawn Approach (IRE) 2010	Hymn of the Dawn (USA); 1999	Colonial Debut	Pleasant Colony
Sire Dawn Approach (IRE) 2010	Hymn of the Dawn (USA); 1999	Colonial Debut	Kittihawk Miss
Dam Maria Lee (IRE) 2007	Rock of Gibraltar (IRE); 1999	Danehill (USA)	Danzig
Dam Maria Lee (IRE) 2007	Rock of Gibraltar (IRE); 1999	Danehill (USA)	Razyana
Dam Maria Lee (IRE) 2007	Rock of Gibraltar (IRE); 1999	Offshore Boom	Be My Guest (USA)
Dam Maria Lee (IRE) 2007	Rock of Gibraltar (IRE); 1999	Offshore Boom	Push A Button
Dam Maria Lee (IRE) 2007	Elida (IRE); 1994	Royal Academy (USA)	Nijinsky (CAN)
Dam Maria Lee (IRE) 2007	Elida (IRE); 1994	Royal Academy (USA)	Crimson Saint
Dam Maria Lee (IRE) 2007	Elida (IRE); 1994	Saviour (USA)	Majestic Light
Dam Maria Lee (IRE) 2007	Elida (IRE); 1994	Saviour (USA)	Victorian Queen (CAN) (Family: 1-n)

== Stud record ==
In October 2021 Jim Bolger announced that Poetic Flare was retired from racing and would commence his breeding career at the Shadai Stallion Station in Hokkaido, Japan.
