= Tawkeel =

British-bred Thoroughbred racehorse

- Racing silks of Hamdan Al Maktoum
- Sire: Teofilo
- Grandsire: Galileo
- Dam: Rafaadah
- Damsire: Oasis Dream
- Sex: Filly
- Foaled: 29 January 2017
- Country: United Kingdom
- Colour: Bay
- Breeder: Shadwell Estate Co Ltd
- Owner: Hamdan Al Maktoum
- Trainer: Jean-Claude Rouget
- Record: 6: 5-0-0
- Earnings: £161,983

Major wins
- Prix Saint-Alary (2020); Prix de la Nonette (2020)

Tawkeel (foaled 29 January 2017) is a British-bred, French-trained Thoroughbred racehorse. She was unraced as a two-year-old in 2019, but in the following season she won her first five races including with a victory in the Prix Saint-Alary and the Prix de la Nonette.

== Background ==
Tawkeel is a bay filly with a white star bred in England by her owner, Hamdan Al Maktoum's Shadwell Estate Co Ltd. She was sent into training with Jean-Claude Rouget at Pau.

She was from the ninth crop of foals sired by the Teofilo the undefeated European Champion Two-Year-Old of 2006. Teofilo's other European offspring have included Cross Counter, Trading Leather, Pleascach and Parish Hall: he has also had great success in Australia where his major winners have included Happy Clapper, Humidor and Kermadec. Tawkeel was the first foal of her dam Rafaadah showed good racing form in France, winning two of her seven races including the Listed Grand Critérium de Bordeaux in October 2014. Rafaadah's dam Joanna was a high-class racemare whose wins included the Prix du Calvados, Prix Imprudence, Prix de Sandringham and Prix de la Porte Maillot. She was descended from the French broodmare Almyre (foaled 1964) making her a female line relative of Arcangues and Cape Verdi.

== Racing career ==
=== 2020: three-year-old season ===
Tawkeel did not race as a juvenile and made her racecourse debut on 3 January when she started the 2.1/1 favourite for a maiden race over 1600 metres on the synthetic Fibresand surface at Pau. Ridden by Jean-Bernard Eyquem she raced in mid division before finishing strongly to take the lead inside the last 100 metres and win by one and a quarter lengths. Six weeks later she was partnered by Cristian Demuro (who rode her in all of her subsequent races that year) when she followed up in a minor event over the same distance on the Polytrack at Cagnes-sur-Mer, leading from the start and winning "easily" by four and a half lengths from Villa Royale. After a break of three months, necessitated by the suspension of racing in France owing to the COVID-19 outbreak, the filly returned in the Prix de Lormoy over 1900 metres on Polytrack at Deauville Racecourse in which she started 1/2 favourite. She settled towards the rear of the field before taking the lead 200 metres from the finish and winning by a head from Wangari, with a gap of ten lengths back to the other three runners.

On 14 June Tawkeel made her turf debut when she was moved up sharply in class to contest the Group 1 Prix Saint-Alary, run that year a month later than usual at Chantilly Racecourse. She started the 3.1/1 second favourite behind the André Fabre-trained Solsticia in a seven-runner field which also included Magic Attitude (Prix Vanteaux) and Savarin (Prix d'Aumale). Demuro settled his filly behind the leaders as Again Music and Magic Attitude set the pace before switching to the outside to make a challenge in the straight. Tawkeel gained the advantage approaching the last 200 metres and pulled away to win by five lengths and a head from Magic Attitude and Solsticia. After the Demuro said "I loved the way she picked up in two strides, I almost felt we were going too fast at the finish. I adore that turn of foot she has."

After a break of over two months, Tawkeel returned in the Prix de la Nonette over 2000 metres at Deauville on 22 August and started the odds on favourite against six opponents headed by the Oaks d'Italia winner Auyantepui. She raced in second place behind the British challenger Frankel's Storm before taking the lead approaching the last 200 metres and held off the persistent challenge of Tickle Me Green to win by half a length. Rouget commented "Turning for home, it looked to me as though she was going to win as easily as she did in the Saint-Alary, but she had to fight. I felt it was the combination of two factors as she definitely needed the race and the ground was too soft for her. I didn’t want to be too hard on her in morning work at home and, anyway, at the end she won safely and the essential has been done."

On 4 October at Longchamp Racecourse Tawkeel was matched against older fillies and mares in the Prix de l'Opera over 2000 metres. She went off the 3.1/1 second favourite and led for most of the way before being overtaken in the straight and sustained her first defeat as she came home fourth behind Tarnawa, Alpine Star and Audarya.

== Pedigree ==
Pedigree of Tawkeel (GB), bay filly, 2017
Sire Teofilo (IRE) 2004	Galileo (IRE); 1998	Sadler's Wells (USA)	Northern Dancer (CAN)
Sire Teofilo (IRE) 2004	Galileo (IRE); 1998	Sadler's Wells (USA)	Fairy Bridge
Sire Teofilo (IRE) 2004	Galileo (IRE); 1998	Urban Sea (USA)	Miswaki
Sire Teofilo (IRE) 2004	Galileo (IRE); 1998	Urban Sea (USA)	Allegretta (GB)
Sire Teofilo (IRE) 2004	Speirbhean (IRE); 1998	Danehill (USA)	Danzig
Sire Teofilo (IRE) 2004	Speirbhean (IRE); 1998	Danehill (USA)	Razyana
Sire Teofilo (IRE) 2004	Speirbhean (IRE); 1998	Saviour (USA)	Majestic Light
Sire Teofilo (IRE) 2004	Speirbhean (IRE); 1998	Saviour (USA)	Victorian Queen (CAN)
Dam Rafaadah (GB) 2012	Oasis Dream (GB); 2000	Green Desert (USA)	Danzig
Dam Rafaadah (GB) 2012	Oasis Dream (GB); 2000	Green Desert (USA)	Foreign Courier
Dam Rafaadah (GB) 2012	Oasis Dream (GB); 2000	Hope (IRE)	Dancing Brave (CAN)
Dam Rafaadah (GB) 2012	Oasis Dream (GB); 2000	Hope (IRE)	Bahamian
Dam Rafaadah (GB) 2012	Joanna (IRE); 2007	High Chaparral	Sadler's Wells (USA)
Dam Rafaadah (GB) 2012	Joanna (IRE); 2007	High Chaparral	Kasora
Dam Rafaadah (GB) 2012	Joanna (IRE); 2007	Secrete Marina	Mujadil (USA)
Dam Rafaadah (GB) 2012	Joanna (IRE); 2007	Secrete Marina	Marina Lady (USA) (Family: 8-f)

- Tawkeel was inbred 3 × 4 to Sadler's Wells, meaning that this stallion appears in both the third and fourth generations of her pedigree. She was also inbred 3 × 4 to Danzig. Both Sadler's Wells and Danzig were sons of Northern Dancer.
