= Maroof (horse) =

American-bred Thoroughbred racehorse

- Sire: Danzig
- Grandsire: Northern Dancer
- Dam: Dish Dash
- Damsire: Bustino
- Sex: Stallion
- Foaled: 12 April 1990
- Country: United States
- Colour: Bay
- Breeder: Shadwell Farm
- Owner: Hamdan Al Maktoum
- Trainer: Robert Armstrong
- Record: 13: 4-5-1
- Earnings: £284,474

Major wins
- Vintage Stakes (1992); Queen Elizabeth II Stakes (1994)

Maroof (12 April 1990 – 30 December 1999) was an American-bred, British-trained Thoroughbred racehorse and sire best known for his upset victory over a top-class field in the 1994 Queen Elizabeth II Stakes. He showed very promising form in his four races as a juvenile in 1992, winning the Group Three Vintage Stakes and finishing a close second in the Group One National Stakes. He had problems with injuries as a three-year-old and won one minor race from only two starts in the autumn. As a four-year-old he ran consistently, finishing second in the Brigadier Gerard Stakes, International Stakes and Park Stakes but appeared to be just below top class. On his final appearance however, he produced by far his best performance as he led from the start and won the Queen Elizabeth II Stakes at odd of 66/1 from opponents including Barathea, Bigstone, Distant View, Turtle Island, East of the Moon and Sayyedati. He was retired to stud at the end of the year and had some success as a sire of winners in New Zealand. He died in 1999.

== Background ==
Maroof was a bay horse bred in Kentucky by his owner Hamdan Al Maktoum's Shadwell Farm. His sire Danzig, who ran only three times before his career was ended by injury, was a highly successful stallion who sired the winners of more than fifty Grade I/Group One races. His offspring include the champions Chief's Crown, Dayjur and Lure as well as the important stallions Green Desert and Danehill.

Maroof's dam Dish Dash was a high-class racemare who won the Ribblesdale Stakes at Royal Ascot and finished third in the Yorkshire Oaks in 1982. She became equally successful as a broodmare with her other descendants including Desert King and the Oaks d'Italia winner Contredanse.

Hamdan Al Maktoum opted to race Maroof in Europe and sent him into training with Robert Armstrong at his St Gatien stable in Newmarket in Suffolk. He was ridden in ten of thirteen his races by the Scottish jockey Willie Carson.

== Racing career ==
=== 1992: two-year-old season ===
Maroof began his racing career in a maiden race over five furlongs at Lingfield Park Racecourse on 20 June. Starting at odds of 4/1 in a nine-runner field he took the lead after two furlongs and won by a length from Young Ern (later to win the Hungerford Stakes). In July he was moved up in distance for the Black Duck Stakes over six furlongs at York Racecourse and finished second of the three runners, beaten half a length by the Paul Cole-trained favourite Splendent. At the end of the month the colt was moved up in class and distance for the Group Three Vintage Stakes over seven furlongs at Goodwood Racecourse. He started at odds of 8/1 in a ten-runner field with his opponents including the Chesham Stakes winner Humam (the 4/1 favourite), Ancestral Dancer (a three-time Listed race winner in Italy) and Port Lucaya (later to win the Premio Vittorio di Capua). Maroof turned into the straight in fifth place behind the outsider Persian Revival, took the lead a furlong out, and won by a length and a half from Humam. On 19 September, Maroof was sent to Ireland and stepped up to the highest class for the Group One National Stakes over seven furlongs at the Curragh Racecourse and started 9/4 second favourite in a five-runner field. He took the early lead and set a steady pace before accelerating a quarter of a mile from the finish but was caught in the closing stages and beaten half a length by the Vincent O'Brien-trained favourite Fatherland.

=== 1993: three-year-old season ===
Maroof had training problems in 1993 and missed the spring and summer before returning in September for a minor race over one mile at Newbury Racecourse. Ridden by Richard Hills he started the 7/4 favourite and led for most of the way before winning by one and a half lengths from Redenham. In October he was sent to France for the Group Two Prix du Rond Point over 1600 metres on heavy ground at Longchamp Racecourse. He finished third behind Voleris and Alflora with the favourite Gold Splash back in eighth place.

=== 1994: four-year-old season ===
Maroof began his third season in the Lockinge Stakes at Newbury on 13 May and finished fifth of the eleven runners, six lengths behind the winner Emperor Jones. Later that month he was moved up in distance for the Brigadier Gerard Stakes over ten furlongs at Sandown Park Racecourse and finished second to Chatoyant. He was then sent to Ireland for the International Stakes at the Curragh on 26 June. He raced in second behind Alflora before taking the lead a furlong out but was caught in the final stride by the rallying Alflora and beaten a short head. The colt was dropped to Group Three class over ten furlongs at Ayr Racecourse in July and finished fourth behind Beneficial. In August he was back in Ireland and started favourite for the Desmond Stakes but ran poorly and beat only one of his nine opponents in a race won by Bin Ajwaad.

Richard Hills resumed his partnership with Maroof in the Park Stakes at Doncaster Racecourse on 8 September. He led for most of the way before being caught in the final strides and beaten a neck by the four-year-old gelding Soviet Line. Hills retained the ride when Maroof returned to Group One level for the first time in over two years for the Queen Elizabeth II Stakes on good to soft ground at Ascot on 24 September. He was widely expected to serve as a pacemaker for his owner's more fancied runner Mehthaaf, winner of the Irish 1,000 Guineas who was ridden by Carson. The rest of the nine-runner field looked exceptionally strong, including Distant View, East of the Moon, Turtle Island, Ski Paradise (Prix du Moulin), Bigstone, Barathea and Sayyedati with Maroof the complete outsider at odds of 66/1. Hills sent Maroof into the lead from the start and set the pace from Distant View and Sayyedati whilst the other runners were restrained by their jockeys. In the straight Maroof showed no signs of weakening and stayed on "gamely" to win by one and a quarter lengths and a length from Barathea and Bigstone. Immediately after the race Robert Armstrong said "He has had an unlucky season, he was very well, he had his ground and the only amazing thing to me was the price. I thought he'd run a big race, and I backed him".

On his retirement from training in 2000, Armstong explained "Willie Carson always said Maroof needed to be held up, but Richard Hills, who rode him a lot of work, said: `This horse wants be allowed to run'. We tried it at Doncaster, just before Ascot, and he was only just beat. In the QE2 I knew that if he could accelerate twice in the straight he'd win, and he did just that-eight Group 1 winners behind him and not the trace of a fluke about it."

== Stud record ==
Maroof was retired from racing to become a breeding stallion at the Cambridge Stud in New Zealand. He had early problems with fertility which led an insurance claim before he was bought back by the stud's owner Patrick Hogan. His fertility improved and he became quite successful, with his best offspring included Natural Blitz (Hong Kong Sprint), Maroofity (Manawatu Sires Produce Stakes), Figures (Champions Mile), Majestically (Summer Cup (ATC)) and Beat The Fade (Emancipation Stakes). He died of a ruptured blood vessel on 30 December 1999.

== Pedigree ==
Pedigree of Maroof (USA), bay stallion, 1990
Sire Danzig (USA) 1977	Northern Dancer (CAN); 1961	Nearctic	Nearco
Sire Danzig (USA) 1977	Northern Dancer (CAN); 1961	Nearctic	Lady Angela
Sire Danzig (USA) 1977	Northern Dancer (CAN); 1961	Natalma	Native Dancer
Sire Danzig (USA) 1977	Northern Dancer (CAN); 1961	Natalma	Almahmoud
Sire Danzig (USA) 1977	Pas de Nom (USA); 1968	Admiral's Voyage	Crafty Admiral
Sire Danzig (USA) 1977	Pas de Nom (USA); 1968	Admiral's Voyage	Olympia Lou
Sire Danzig (USA) 1977	Pas de Nom (USA); 1968	Petitioner	Petition
Sire Danzig (USA) 1977	Pas de Nom (USA); 1968	Petitioner	Steady Aim
Dam Dish Dash (GB) 1979	Bustino (GB); 1971	Busted	Crepello
Dam Dish Dash (GB) 1979	Bustino (GB); 1971	Busted	Sans le Sou
Dam Dish Dash (GB) 1979	Bustino (GB); 1971	Ship Yard	Doutelle
Dam Dish Dash (GB) 1979	Bustino (GB); 1971	Ship Yard	Paving Stone
Dam Dish Dash (GB) 1979	Loose Cover (GB); 1963	Venture	Relic
Dam Dish Dash (GB) 1979	Loose Cover (GB); 1963	Venture	Rose o' Lynn
Dam Dish Dash (GB) 1979	Loose Cover (GB); 1963	Nymphet	Nearula
Dam Dish Dash (GB) 1979	Loose Cover (GB); 1963	Nymphet	Circassia (Family: 1-k)
