= Futurity Stakes (Ireland) =

Flat horse race in Ireland

- Class: Group 2
- Location: Curragh Racecourse; County Kildare, Ireland
- Race type: Flat / Thoroughbred
- Sponsor: Coolmore Stud
- Website: Curragh

Race information
- Distance: 7f (1,408 metres)
- Surface: Turf
- Track: Right-hand elbow
- Qualification: Two-year-olds
- Weight: 9 st 3 lb Allowances; 3 lb for fillies Penalties; 5 lb for Group 1 winners 3 lb for Group 2 winners
- Purse: € 94,000 (2021); 1st: € 59,000

Futurity Stakes
2026
Giant Sequoia	Florida Bay	Green Dreamer

Previous years
2025
Constitution River	Geryon	Go Just Do It
2024
Henri Matisse	Hotazhell	Scorthy Champ
2023
Henry Longfellow	Islandsinthestream	Portland
2022
Aesop's Fables	Hans Andersen	Proud And Regal
2021
Point Lonsdale	Maritime Wings	The Acropolis

2020-2011
2020
Mac Swiney	Cadillac	Ontario
2019
Armory	Rebel Tale	Geometrical
2018
Anthony Van Dyck	Christmas	Mohawk
2017
Rostropovich	Coat Of Arms	Berkeley Square
2016
Churchill	Radio Silence	Arcada
2015
Herald The Dawn	Now Or Never	Shogun
2014
Gleneagles	Vert De Grece	Hall Of Fame
2013
War Command	Mustajeeb	Exogenesis
2012
First Cornerstone	Flying The Flag	Birdman
2011
Dragon Pulse	Parish Hall	Astrology

2010-2001
2010
Pathfork	Glor Na Mara	Samuel Morse
2009
Cape Blanco	Mister Tee	King Ledley
2008
Arazan	Ryehill Dreamer	Grand Ducal
2007
New Approach	Curtain Call	Henrythenavigator
2006
Teofilo	Eagle Mountain	Ferneley
2005
Horatio Nelson	Galantas	Silent Times
2004
Oratorio	Democratic Deficit	Elusive Double
2003
Pearl of Love	Tumblebrutus	The Mighty Tiger
2002
Van Nistelrooy	Chappel Cresent	Wilful
2001
Hawk Wing	Sholokhov	Stage Call

2000-1991
2000
Lady Lahar	Bonnard	Beckett
1999
Giant's Causeway	Brahms	Polish Panache
1998
St Clair Ridge	Mus-If	Flip The Switch
1997
Impressionist	Fruits Of Love	Natalis
1996
Equal Rights	Recondite	ReconditeI
1995
Bijou D'Inde	Axford	Classic Fountain
1994
Jural	Indian Wedding	Via Lombardia
1993
Cois Na Tine	Ballykett Nancy	City Nights
1992
Fatherland	Newton's Law	Colour Party
1991
St Jovite	Tik Fa	Mekong

1990-1988
1990
Misty Valley	Star Of Gdansk	Misty Wind
1989
Teach Dha Mhile	Annie Laurie	Hero's Welcome
1988
Phantom Breeze	Solar Myth	Dawn Success

The Futurity Stakes is a Group 2 flat horse race in Ireland open to two-year-old thoroughbreds. It is run at the Curragh over a distance of 7 furlongs (1,408 metres), and it is scheduled to take place each year in August.

== History ==
The event was previously known as the Ashford Castle Stakes and the Stayers Plate. It was originally contested over 7 furlongs, but it was extended to a mile in 1969. For a period it was classed at Group 3 level.

The race's current spell over 7 furlongs began in 1997. It was promoted to Group 2 status in 2001. The Futurity Stakes is now sponsored by Coolmore Stud, and its full title includes the name of Wootton Bassett, a Coolmore stallion.

== Records ==
Leading jockey since 1950 (7 wins):

- Michael Kinane – Without Reserve (1983), Phantom Breeze (1988), Teach Dha Mhile (1989), Giant's Causeway (1999), Hawk Wing (2001), Van Nistelrooy (2002), Arazan (2008)
- Ryan Moore - Rostropovich (2017), Anthony Van Dyck (2018), Armory (2019), Point Lonsdale (2021), Aesop's Fables (2022), Henry Longfellow (2023), Henri Matisse (2024)

Leading trainer since 1950 (19 wins):

- Aidan O'Brien – Impressionist (1997), Giant's Causeway (1999), Hawk Wing (2001), Van Nistelrooy (2002), Oratorio (2004), Horatio Nelson (2005), Cape Blanco (2009), War Command (2013), Gleneagles (2014), Churchill (2016), Rostropovich (2017), Anthony Van Dyck (2018), Armory (2019), Point Lonsdale (2021), Aesop's Fables (2022), Henry Longfellow (2023), Henri Matisse (2024), Constitution River (2025), Giant Sequoia (2026)

== Winners since 1980 ==
Year	Winner	Jockey	Trainer	Time
1980	Benefice	Christy Roche	Vincent O'Brien
1981	Anfield	Christy Roche	David O'Brien
1982	Danzatore	Pat Eddery	Vincent O'Brien
1983	Without Reserve	Michael Kinane	Liam Browne
1984	Sunstart	Pat Eddery	Vincent O'Brien
1985	Woodman	Pat Eddery	Vincent O'Brien	1:43.80
1986	Sanam	Steve Cauthen	John Dunlop
1987	Demon Magic	John Reid	John Oxx	1:48.10
1988	Phantom Breeze	Michael Kinane	Dermot Weld	1:44.90
1989	Teach Dha Mhile	Michael Kinane	Dermot Weld	1:41.50
1990	Misty Valley	Steve Cauthen	Michael Kauntze	1:40.90
1991	St Jovite	Christy Roche	Jim Bolger	1:39.50
1992	Fatherland	Lester Piggott	Vincent O'Brien	1:28.20
1993	Cois Na Tine	Christy Roche	Jim Bolger	1:41.50
1994	Jural	Michael Roberts	Mark Johnston	1:42.00
1995	Bijou d'Inde	Jason Weaver	Mark Johnston	1:38.70
1996	Equal Rights	John Reid	Peter Chapple-Hyam	1:39.90
1997	Impressionist	Christy Roche	Aidan O'Brien	1:26.60
1998	St Clair Ridge	Kevin Manning	Jim Bolger	1:25.90
1999	Giant's Causeway	Michael Kinane	Aidan O'Brien	1:25.00
2000	Lady Lahar	Johnny Murtagh	Mick Channon	1:35.70
2001	Hawk Wing	Michael Kinane	Aidan O'Brien	1:25.70
2002	Van Nistelrooy	Michael Kinane	Aidan O'Brien	1:24.30
2003	Pearl of Love	Darryll Holland	Mark Johnston	1:22.50
2004	Oratorio	Jamie Spencer	Aidan O'Brien	1:25.70
2005	Horatio Nelson	Kieren Fallon	Aidan O'Brien	1:23.30
2006	Teofilo	Kevin Manning	Jim Bolger	1:22.60
2007	New Approach	Kevin Manning	Jim Bolger	1:29.00
2008	Arazan	Michael Kinane	John Oxx	1:33.61
2009	Cape Blanco (Note: The 2009 running took place at Fairyhouse)	Johnny Murtagh	Aidan O'Brien	1:32.59
2010	Pathfork	Fran Berry	Jessica Harrington	1:23.45
2011	Dragon Pulse	Fran Berry	Jessica Harrington	1:25.50
2012	First Cornerstone	Chris Hayes	Andrew Oliver	1:32.54
2013	War Command	Joseph O'Brien	Aidan O'Brien	1:23.94
2014	Gleneagles	Joseph O'Brien	Aidan O'Brien	1:26.32
2015	Herald The Dawn	Kevin Manning	Jim Bolger	1:26.59
2016	Churchill	Seamie Heffernan	Aidan O'Brien	1:27.36
2017	Rostropovich	Ryan Moore	Aidan O'Brien	1:29.29
2018	Anthony Van Dyck	Ryan Moore	Aidan O'Brien	1:24.37
2019	Armory	Ryan Moore	Aidan O'Brien	1:28.03
2020	Mac Swiney	Kevin Manning	Jim Bolger	1:29.68
2021	Point Lonsdale	Ryan Moore	Aidan O'Brien	1:27.75
2022	Aesop's Fables	Ryan Moore	Aidan O'Brien	1:23.45
2023	Henry Longfellow	Ryan Moore	Aidan O'Brien	1:26.44
2024	Henri Matisse	Ryan Moore	Aidan O'Brien	1:24.11
2025	Constitution River	Wayne Lordan	Aidan O'Brien	1:26.09
2026	Giant Sequoia	Wayne Lordan	Aidan O'Brien	1:24.44

== Earlier winners ==
- 1950: Sea Prince
- 1951: Coolabah
- 1952: Chamier
- 1953: Kingsley
- 1954: Katushev
- 1955: Clelie
- 1956: Martini
- 1957: Paddy's Point
- 1958: Dusky Boy
- 1959: Say Less
- 1960: Carsage
- 1961: Sicilian Prince
- 1962: Quick Freeze
- 1963: Californian
- 1964: Baljour
- 1965: Bellis
- 1966: Zaracarn
- 1967: French Serenade
- 1968: Santamoss
- 1969: Great Life
- 1970: Tantoul
- 1971: i) Bog Road, ii) Flair Path *
- 1972: Seaford
- 1973: Sir Penfro
- 1974: Small World
- 1975: I've a Bee
- 1976: Padroug
- 1977: Octavo
- 1978: Accomplice
- 1979: Monteverdi

* The race was run in two separate divisions in 1971.

== See also ==
- Horse racing in Ireland
- List of Irish flat horse races
