= Killavullan Stakes =

Flat horse race in Ireland

- Class: Group 3
- Location: Leopardstown; County Dublin, Ireland
- Race type: Flat / Thoroughbred
- Website: Leopardstown

Race information
- Distance: 7f (1,408 metres)
- Surface: Turf
- Track: Left-handed
- Qualification: Two-year-olds
- Weight: 9 st 3 lb Allowances; 3 lb for fillies Penalties; 7 lb for Group 1 winners 5 lb for Group 2 winners 5 lb if two Group 3 wins 3 lb if one Group 3 win
- Purse: €47,000 (2022); 1st: €29,500

Killavullan Stakes
2026
Capability Brown	Trean	King Of Cloughan

Previous years
2025
Dorset	Daytona	Spangled Sands
2024
Exactly	Antelope Canyon	Rudi's Apple
2023
Atlantic Coast	Bright Stripes	Military
2022
Cairo	Sierra Blanca	Bold Discovery
2021
Glounthaune	Pennine Hills	I Am Magic

2020-2011
2020
Poetic Flare	Zaffy's Pride	Mexico City
2019
Stela Star	Iberia	Katiba
2018
Coral Beach	Guaranteed	Old Glory
2017
Kenya	Mcmunigal	Bye Bye Baby
2016
Making Light	Spirit of Valor	Taj Mahal
2015
Blue De Vega	Tribal Beat	Black Sea
2014
Steip Amach	Royal Navy Ship	Cocoon
2013
Craftsman	Michaelmas	Shining Emerald
2012
Big Break	Beyond Thankful	Coolibah
2011
Nephrite	Born To Sea	Aaraas

2010-2001
2010
Dubai Prince	Warning Flag	Park Avenue
2009
Free Judgement	Lord High Admiral	Keredari
2008
Rayeni	Vitruvian Man	Gluteus Maximus
2007
Jupiter Pluvius	Famous Name	Billyford
2006
Confuchias	Albert Einstein	Frederick Ozanam
2005
Frost Giant	Abigail Pett	Jioconda
2004
Footstepsinthesand	Gaff	Clash Of The Ash
2003
Grey Swallow	Newton	Takrice
2002
New South Wales	Napper Tandy	France
2001
Stonemason	Temple Of Artemis	Ulysees

2000-1991
2000
Perigee Moon	Dr Brendler	Love Me True
1999
Monashee Mountain	Bashkir	Margay
1998
Athlumney Lady	Saffron Walden	Akbar
1997
Kincara Palace	Musk Lime	Takarian
1996
Shell Ginger	Lil's Boy	Carlisle Bay
1995
Aylesbury	Errazuriz	Dance Clear
1994
Kill The Crab	Khaytada	Mediation
1993
Broadmara	Tragic Point	Razida
1992
Asema	Alouette	Just Speculation
1991
Misako-Togo	Ebaziya	Gentle Step

1990-1988
1990
Glowing Ardour	Nordic Soprano	Shimmering Sea
1989
Endless Joy	Front Line Romance	Mistral's Collette
1988
Sedulous	Try My Rosie	Goodnight Moon

The Killavullan Stakes is a Group 3 flat horse race in Ireland open to two-year-old thoroughbreds. It is run at Leopardstown over a distance of 7 furlongs (1,408 metres), and it is scheduled to take place each year in late October.

== History ==
The event was formerly named after Silken Glider, the winner of the Irish Oaks in 1957. It was run at Baldoyle in 1969, and at Phoenix Park in 1970.

The Silken Glider Stakes was restricted to fillies, and for a period it was held in mid-September. It was contested over a mile in the 1970s and 1980s, and during this period it became known as the Killavullan Stakes. The Silken Glider Stakes is the now the registered title of a race for two-year-old fillies at The Curragh.

The race was moved to late October in 1993. It was cut to 7 furlongs and opened to colts and geldings in 1995.

== Records ==
Leading jockey since 1969 (5 wins):

- George McGrath – French Score (1969), Ballet Francais (1970), Ellette (1971), Silk Buds (1973), Dolly Dewdrop (1977)
- Christy Roche – Slow March (1978), Blue Wind (1980), Shindella (1983), Alydar's Best (1984), Lomond Blossom (1987)
- Seamie Heffernan - Shell Ginger (1996), Kincara Palace (1997), Stonemason (2001), Jupiter Pluvius (2007), Glounthaune (2021)

Leading trainer since 1969 (17 wins):

- Aidan O'Brien – Shell Ginger (1996), Kincara Palace (1997), Monashee Mountain (1999), Perigee Moon (2000), Stonemason (2001), Footstepsinthesand (2004), Frost Giant (2005), Jupiter Pluvius (2007), Nephrite (2011), Craftsman (2013), Kenya (2017), Coral Beach (2018), Glounthaune (2021), Cairo (2022), Exactly (2024), Dorset (2025), Capability Brown (2026)

== Winners since 1979 ==
Year	Winner	Jockey	Trainer	Time
1979	Forlene	Steve Cauthen	Vincent O'Brien	1:42.20
1980	Blue Wind	Christy Roche	Paddy Prendergast Jr.	1:42.30
1981	Prince's Polly	Wally Swinburn	Tom Nicholson	1:42.80
1982	Impudent Miss	Steve Cauthen	Liam Browne	1:43.40
1983	Shindella	Christy Roche	R. J. Cotter	1:44.50
1984	Alydar's Best	Christy Roche	David O'Brien	1:40.40
1985	Valley Victory	Michael Wigham	Mark Usher	1:42.40
1986	Inanna	Dermot Hogan	John Oxx	1:41.00
1987	Lomond Blossom	Christy Roche	David O'Brien	1:45.80
1988	Sedulous	Michael Kinane	Dermot Weld	1:41.00
1989	Endless Joy	John Reid	Robert Williams	1:40.40
1990	Glowing Ardour	Paul Eddery	Michael Stoute	1:40.80
1991	Misako-Togo	Michael Kinane	Dermot Weld	1:43.70
1992	Asema	Pat Shanahan	Dermot Weld	1:44.40
1993	Broadmara	Richard Hughes	Adrian Maxwell	1:45.10
1994	Kill the Crab	Pat Gilson	Con Collins	1:44.00
1995	Aylesbury	Johnny Murtagh	John Oxx	1:30.00
1996	Shell Ginger	Seamie Heffernan	Aidan O'Brien	1:33.70
1997	Kincara Palace	Seamie Heffernan	Aidan O'Brien	1:31.60
1998	Athlumney Lady	Kevin Manning	Jim Bolger	1:39.60
1999	Monashee Mountain	Michael Kinane	Aidan O'Brien	1:36.80
2000	Perigee Moon	Michael Kinane	Aidan O'Brien	1:38.60
2001	Stonemason	Seamie Heffernan	Aidan O'Brien	1:32.80
2002	New South Wales	Johnny Murtagh	John Oxx	1:29.10
2003	Grey Swallow	Pat Smullen	Dermot Weld	1:26.70
2004	Footstepsinthesand	Jamie Spencer	Aidan O'Brien	1:32.90
2005	Frost Giant	Kieren Fallon	Aidan O'Brien	1:39.10
2006	Confuchias	Willie Supple	Francis Ennis	1:35.70
2007	Jupiter Pluvius	Seamie Heffernan	Aidan O'Brien	1:29.19
2008	Rayeni	Fran Berry	John Oxx	1:33.85
2009	Free Judgement	Kevin Manning	Jim Bolger	1:29.56
2010	Dubai Prince	Pat Smullen	Dermot Weld	1:28.13
2011	Nephrite	Joseph O'Brien	Aidan O'Brien	1:29.53
2012	Big Break	Pat Smullen	Dermot Weld	1:32.68
2013	Craftsman	Michael Hussey	Aidan O'Brien	1:33.18
2014	Steip Amach	Kevin Manning	Jim Bolger	1:32.96
2015	Blue De Vega	Colin Keane	Michael O'Callaghan	1:33.09
2016	Making Light	Pat Smullen	Dermot Weld	1:31.15
2017	Kenya	Donnacha O'Brien	Aidan O'Brien	1:35.28
2018	Coral Beach	Michael Hussey	Aidan O'Brien	1:28.89
2019	Stela Star	Colin Keane	Thomas Mullins	1:37.16
2020	Poetic Flare	Kevin Manning	Jim Bolger	1:31.92
2021	Glounthaune	Seamie Heffernan	Aidan O'Brien	1:29.35
2022	Cairo	Wayne Lordan	Aidan O'Brien	1:31.73
2023	Atlantic Coast	Declan McDonogh	Joseph O'Brien	1:40.96
2024	Exactly	Wayne Lordan	Aidan O'Brien	1:34.08
2025	Dorset	Jack Cleary	Aidan O'Brien	1:33.66
2026	Capability Brown	Wayne Lordan	Aidan O'Brien	1:30.99

== Earlier winners ==
- 1969: French Score
- 1970: Ballet Francais
- 1971: Ellette
- 1972: Daria
- 1973: Silk Buds
- 1974: Frances Jordan
- 1975: Glanoe
- 1976: Nanticious
- 1977: Dolly Dewdrop
- 1978: Slow March

== See also ==
- Horse racing in Ireland
- List of Irish flat horse races
