= Tyros Stakes =

Flat horse race in Ireland

- Class: Group 3
- Location: Leopardstown; County Dublin, Ireland
- Race type: Flat / Thoroughbred
- Sponsor: Japan Racing Association
- Website: Leopardstown

Race information
- Distance: 7f (1,408 metres)
- Surface: Turf
- Track: Left-handed
- Qualification: Two-year-olds
- Weight: 9 st 5 lb Allowances; 3 lb for fillies Penalties; 5 lb for Group 2 winners 3 lb for Group 3 winners
- Purse: €60,000 (2025); 1st: €34,400

Tyros Stakes
2026
Florida Bay	Folsom Blues	Nail House

Previous years
2025
North Coast	Flushing Meadows	Prospect Thunder
2024
Hotazhell	Swagman	Surpass
2023
Henry Adams	Devious	Chicago Fireball
2022
Proud And Regal	Hellsing	Age Of Kings
2021
Point Lonsdale	Maritime Wings	Unconquerable

2020-2011
2020
Military Style	Van Gogh	Masen
2019
Armory	Toronto	Zarzyni
2018
Anthony Van Dyck	Bold Approach	Copia Verborum
2017
The Pentagon	Theobald	Would Be King
2016
Churchill	Alexios Komnenos	Currency Converter
2015
Deauville	Sanus Per Aquam	Lieutenant General
2014
Gleneagles	Tombelaine	Convergence
2013
Exogenesis	Home School	Sir John Hawkins
2012
Grafelli	Lines of Battle	Kingston Jamaica
2011
Remember Alexander	Parish Hall	Tenth Star

2010-2001
2010
Zoffany	High Ruler	Jolie Jioconde
2009
Cape Blanco	Marfach	Perfect Symmetry
2008
Rip Van Winkle	Cuis Ghaire	Vilasol
2007
New Approach	Brazilian Star	Norman Invader
2006
Teofilo	Middleham	Whatsthescript
2005
Modeeroch	Marcus Andronicus	Keyhopper
2004
Elusive Double	Lock And Key	Amsterdam
2003
Privy Seal	Wathab	Mahogany
2002
Van Nistelrooy	Etruscan King	Chappel Cresent
2001
Dress To Thrill	Shah Jehan	Line Rider

2000-1991
2000
Softly Tread	Resonate	Blixen
1999
Royal Kingdom	Anzari	Sharp Focus
1998
Artistic Blue	Mus-If	Windward Rock
1997
King Of Kings	Sharp Play	Photogenic
1996
Swift Gulliver	Desert King	Act Of Defiance
1995
Common Spirit	Nashcash	Classic Fountain
1994
Via Lombardia	Zanella	White Satin
1993
Majestic Role	Gothic Dream	Via Condotti
1992
Fatherland	Frenchpark	Earl Of Barking
1991
Irish Memory	Legal Pressure	Spanish Storm

1990-1989
1990
Approach The Bench	Golden Mintage	Star Of Gdansk
1989
Go And Go	Pictorial	Nordican

The Tyros Stakes is a Group 3 flat horse race in Ireland open to two-year-old thoroughbreds. It is run at Leopardstown over a distance of 7 furlongs (1,408 metres), and it is scheduled to take place each year in July.

The event used to be held at the Curragh in mid August. For a period it was classed at Listed level. It was switched to late July in 2000, and it was transferred to Leopardstown in 2003. It was promoted to Group 3 status in 2007.

== Records ==
Leading jockey since 1986 (7 wins):

- Kevin Manning – Via Lombardia (1994), Swift Gulliver (1996), Artistic Blue (1998), Modeeroch (2005), Teofilo (2006), New Approach (2007), Grafelli (2012)

Leading trainer since 1986 (17 wins):

- Aidan O'Brien - Common Spirit (1995), King of Kings (1997), Royal Kingdom (1999), Van Nistelrooy (2002), Rip Van Winkle (2008), Cape Blanco (2009), Zoffany (2010), Gleneagles (2014), Deauville (2015), Churchill (2016), The Pentagon (2017), Anthony Van Dyck (2018), Armory (2019), Military Style (2020), Point Lonsdale (2021), Henry Adams (2023), Florida Bay (2026)

== Winners since 1986 ==
Year	Winner	Jockey	Trainer	Time
1986	Tapolite	Gabriel Curran	Kevin Prendergast	1:28.30
1987	Project Manager	Christy Roche	Jim Bolger	1:25.50
1988	Osmar	Michael Kinane	Dermot Weld	1:35.40
1989	Go and Go	Michael Kinane	Dermot Weld	1:25.70
1990	Approach the Bench	Michael Hills	John Mulhern	1:25.80
1991	Irish Memory	Christy Roche	Jim Bolger	1:24.00
1992	Fatherland	Lester Piggott	Vincent O'Brien	1:26.90
1993	Majestic Role	Robert Burke	Michael Kauntze	1:31.40
1994	Via Lombardia	Kevin Manning	Jim Bolger	1:25.40
1995	Common Spirit	Christy Roche	Aidan O'Brien	1:25.90
1996	Swift Gulliver	Kevin Manning	Jim Bolger	1:25.30
1997	King of Kings	Christy Roche	Aidan O'Brien	1:26.10
1998	Artistic Blue	Kevin Manning	Jim Bolger	1:23.10
1999	Royal Kingdom	Michael Kinane	Aidan O'Brien	1:23.40
2000	Softly Tread	Pat Shanahan	Con Collins	1:25.70
2001	Dress to Thrill	Pat Smullen	Dermot Weld	1:22.60
2002	Van Nistelrooy	Michael Kinane	Aidan O'Brien	1:32.70
2003	Privy Seal	Jimmy Fortune	John Gosden	1:30.00
2004	Elusive Double	Pat Shanahan	Dermot Weld	1:29.10
2005	Modeeroch	Kevin Manning	Jim Bolger	1:27.30
2006	Teofilo	Kevin Manning	Jim Bolger	1:30.00
2007	New Approach	Kevin Manning	Jim Bolger	1:30.68
2008	Rip Van Winkle	Johnny Murtagh	Aidan O'Brien	1:30.72
2009	Cape Blanco	Johnny Murtagh	Aidan O'Brien	1:32.73
2010	Zoffany	Johnny Murtagh	Aidan O'Brien	1:32.61
2011	Remember Alexander	Johnny Murtagh	Jessica Harrington	1:32.39
2012	Grafelli	Kevin Manning	Jim Bolger	1:30.31
2013	Exogenesis	Gary Carroll	Ger Lyons	1:30.50
2014	Gleneagles	Joseph O'Brien	Aidan O'Brien	1:29.92
2015	Deauville	Joseph O'Brien	Aidan O'Brien	1:28.84
2016	Churchill	Ryan Moore	Aidan O'Brien	1:28.37
2017	The Pentagon	Ryan Moore	Aidan O'Brien	1:28.05
2018	Anthony Van Dyck	Ryan Moore	Aidan O'Brien	1:31.11
2019	Armory	Ryan Moore	Aidan O'Brien	1:32.39
2020	Military Style (Note: The 2020 race was run in August due to the COVID-19 pandemic in the Republic of Ireland)	Emmet McNamara	Aidan O'Brien	1:28.07
2021	Point Lonsdale	Ryan Moore	Aidan O'Brien	1:29.47
2022	Proud And Regal	Gavin Ryan	Donnacha O'Brien	1:32.18
2023	Henry Adams	Ryan Moore	Aidan O'Brien	1:32.13
2024	Hotazhell	Shane Foley	Jessica Harrington	1:32.53
2025	North Coast	Dylan Browne McMonagle	Joseph O'Brien	1:32.06
2026	Florida Bay	Wayne Lordan	Aidan O'Brien	1:25.81

== See also ==
- Horse racing in Ireland
- List of Irish flat horse races
