= Pleascach =

Irish-bred Thoroughbred racehorse

Pleascach (IRE)
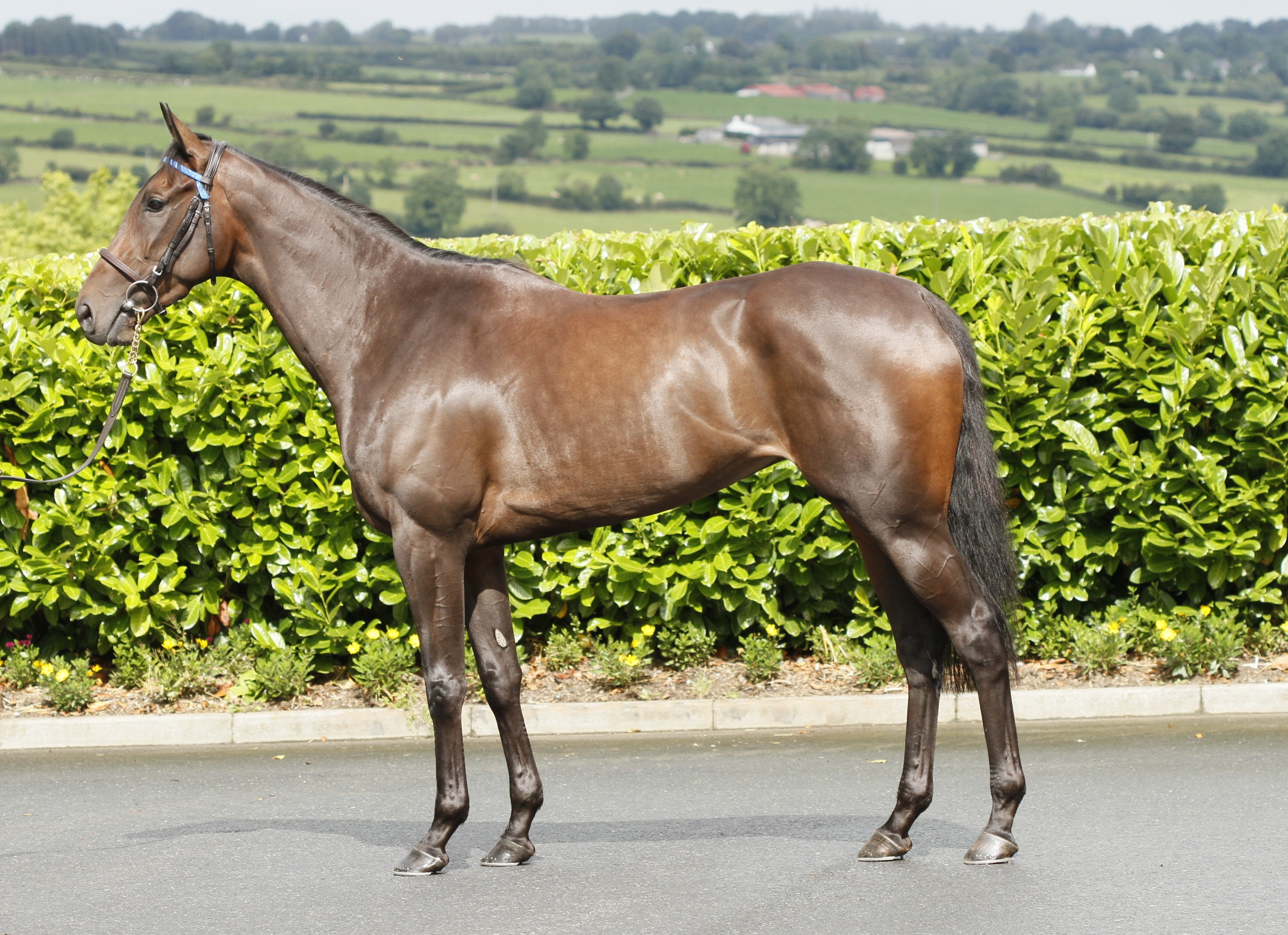
- Sire: Teofilo
- Grandsire: Galileo
- Dam: Toirneach
- Damsire: Thunder Gulch
- Sex: Filly
- Foaled: 6 February 2012 (age 13)
- Country: Ireland
- Colour: Bay
- Breeder: Jim Bolger
- Owner: Jackie Bolger; Godolphin
- Trainer: Jim Bolger
- Record: 10: 4-3-0
- Earnings: £538,915

Major wins
- Blue Wind Stakes (2015); Irish 1000 Guineas (2015); Yorkshire Oaks (2015)

Pleascach (foaled 6 February 2012) is an Irish Thoroughbred racehorse whose wins included the Irish 1000 Guineas and the Yorkshire Oaks. Bred and trained by Jim Bolger she showed promise in two starts as a two-year-old in 2015, finishing fourth in a Group Three race on her debut and then winning a maiden race. In the spring of 2016 she finished second on her first appearance, won the Blue Wind Stakes and then defeated Found in the Irish 1000 Guineas. In summer she was beaten by Curvy in the Ribblesdale Stakes and disappointed in the Pretty Polly Stakes before returning from a lengthy absence to win the Yorkshire Oaks. On her final appearance of the year she finished fourth in a top-class international field for the Irish Champion Stakes.

== Background ==
Pleacach is a bay filly with no white markings bred in Ireland by Jim Bolger. She was sired by Teofilo the undefeated European Champion Two-Year-Old of 2006. Teofilo's other progeny have included Trading Leather, Arod (Summer Mile Stakes), Parish Hall (Dewhurst Stakes) and Kermadec (Doncaster Handicap). Pleacach's dam Toirneach (Irish for thunder) won two minor races in a twelve-race career which lasted from 2007 to 2009. She was a female line descendant of the influential American broodmare Levee.

Pleascach was trained throughout her racing career by Jim Bolger and was ridden in all of her races by Kevin Manning. She initially raced in the ownership of Bolger's wife Jackie. Pleascach is an Irish word meaning explosive.

== Racing career ==
=== 2014: two-year-old season ===
Pleascach made her racecourse debut in the Group Three Grangecon Stud Stakes over six furlongs at the Curragh on 29 June when she started at odds of 16/1 and finished fourth of the eleven runners behind the Aidan O'Brien-trained I Am Beautiful. She reappeared in a maiden race over even furlongs at Leopardstown Racecourse four days later and recorded her first success, taking the lead inside the final furlong and winning by two and three quarter lengths from Simply A Star with Curvy in fourth.

=== 2015: three-year-old season ===
After an absence of over nine months, Pleascach returned in the Listed Salsabil Stakes at Navan Racecourse on 18 April 2015 and finished second, beaten one and half lengths by Bocca Baciata with Diamondsandrubies in third. On 13 May she was stepped up in class for the Grade Three Blue Wind Stakes at Naas Racecourse in which she was matched against older fillies and mares and started favourite against six opponents headed by the Dermot Weld-trained Zannda. Manning sent her into the lead approaching the last quarter mile and went clear of the field to win by eight and a half lengths despite being eased down in the closing strides. Eleven days later Pleascach was one of eighteen fillies to contest the Irish 1000 Guineas at the Curragh and started the 11/2 second favourite behind the Prix Marcel Boussac winner Found. The other runners included Bocca Baciata, Qualify, Kissed By Angels (Leopardstown 1,000 Guineas Trial), Malabar (Prestige Stakes) and Jack Naylor (Silver Flash Stakes). Pleascach raced in third before taking the lead two furlongs out. She opened up a clear advantage and then held off a strong late challenge from Found to win by half a length. Bolger outlined bold plans for the filly, mentioning the Irish Derby and the Irish Oaks as targets and calling her "probably the best filly I've had at a mile and a half". In early June a majority share in the filly was sold to Sheikh Mohammed's Godolphin organisation.

At Royal Ascot Pleascach was moved up in distance and started favourite for the Group Two Ribblesdale Stakes. She overcame some trouble in running to take the lead in the straight but was overtaken in the final furlong and beaten a length into second by Curvy. The Pretty Polly Stakes at the Curragh ten days later saw the filly drop back to a mile and a quarter but never looked likely to win and finished fifth behind Diamondsandrubies, Found, Ribbons and Secret Gesture. After a break of seven weeks Pleascach returned in the Group One Yorkshire Oaks over one and a half miles at York Racecourse on 28 August. The Irish Oaks winner Covert Love started favourite ahead of Jack Naylor and the French challenger Sea Callisi (Prix de Malleret) with Pleascach next in the betting on 8/1 alongside Curvy and Lady of Dubai (third in The Oaks). The best fancied of the other five runners were Outstanding (third in the Grade I Belmont Oaks) and Crystal Zvezda (Fillies' Trial Stakes). Covert Love took the lead soon after the start and set the pace with Pleascach settled in second by Manning just ahead of Curvy and Crystal Zvezda. In the straight the fillies moved off the rail to race down the centre of the track. Pleacach appeared to be struggling in the last quarter mile as Covert Love maintained her advantage whilst Curvy stayed on and Sea Calisi and the outsider Miss Marjurie began to make rapid progress. In the last hundred yards Pleascach produced a strong late rally to catch Covert Love and win by a neck. Sea Calisi, Curvy and Miss Marjurie were close behind in third, fourth and fifth. After the race Manning said "She battled all the way to the line and she's done it very well. I thought she was back to her best when I rode her work last week. She goes on various types of ground and is a very talented filly". Bolger, who was winning the race for the third time, commented "Previously we tried to settle her a little bit and it meant breaking her stride and Kevin decided whatever happened he wasn't going to break her stride today. He gave her a beautiful ride. We knew she was at the top of her game coming here".

On 12 September Pleascach was matched against male opposition for the first time in the Irish Champion Stakes over ten furlongs at Leopardstown. She started a 14/1 outsider in a very strong seven-runner field and finished fourth behind Golden Horn, Found, and Free Eagle, with the other beaten horses being Highland Reel, The Grey Gatsby and Cirrus des Aigles.

=== 2016: four-year-old season ===
Pleascach remained in training as a four-year-old but did not reappear until 3 October when she ran in the Prix de l'Opera over 2000 metres at Chantilly Racecourse. Racing for the first time in well over a year she took the lead soon after the start but was caught in the final strides and beaten a short head by the British-trained Speedy Boarding. Bolger commented "That was good but I was hoping she would win".

== Assessment ==
In the 2015 World's Best Racehorse Rankings Pleascach was given a rating of 115, making her the sixth-best three-year-old filly in Europe.

== Pedigree ==
Pedigree of Pleascach (IRE), bay mare, 2012
Sire Teofilo (IRE) 2004	Galileo (IRE); 1998	Sadler's Wells	Northern Dancer
Sire Teofilo (IRE) 2004	Galileo (IRE); 1998	Sadler's Wells	Fairy Bridge
Sire Teofilo (IRE) 2004	Galileo (IRE); 1998	Urban Sea	Miswaki
Sire Teofilo (IRE) 2004	Galileo (IRE); 1998	Urban Sea	Allegretta
Sire Teofilo (IRE) 2004	Speirbhean (IRE); 1998	Danehill	Danzig
Sire Teofilo (IRE) 2004	Speirbhean (IRE); 1998	Danehill	Razyana
Sire Teofilo (IRE) 2004	Speirbhean (IRE); 1998	Saviour	Majestic Light
Sire Teofilo (IRE) 2004	Speirbhean (IRE); 1998	Saviour	Victorian Queen
Dam Toirneach (USA) 2005	Thunder Gulch (USA); 1992	Gulch	Mr Prospector
Dam Toirneach (USA) 2005	Thunder Gulch (USA); 1992	Gulch	Jameela
Dam Toirneach (USA) 2005	Thunder Gulch (USA); 1992	Line of Thunder	Storm Bird
Dam Toirneach (USA) 2005	Thunder Gulch (USA); 1992	Line of Thunder	Shoot A Line
Dam Toirneach (USA) 2005	Wandering Pine (USA); 1997	Country Pine	His Majesty
Dam Toirneach (USA) 2005	Wandering Pine (USA); 1997	Country Pine	Mountain Sunshine
Dam Toirneach (USA) 2005	Wandering Pine (USA); 1997	Wandering Lace	Private Account
Dam Toirneach (USA) 2005	Wandering Pine (USA); 1997	Wandering Lace	Shujinsky (Family: 9-f)
