= Teofilo (horse) =

Irish Thoroughbred racehorse

- Sire: Galileo
- Grandsire: Sadler's Wells
- Dam: Speirbhean
- Damsire: Danehill
- Sex: Stallion
- Foaled: 2004 (age 21–22)
- Country: Ireland
- Colour: Bay
- Breeder: Jim Bolger
- Owner: Mrs J S Bolger & John Corcoran
- Trainer: Jim Bolger
- Record: 5: 5-0-0
- Earnings: £349,516

Major wins
- Tyros Stakes (2006); Futurity Stakes (2006); National Stakes (2006); Dewhurst Stakes (2006)

Awards
- European Champion Two-Year-Old (2006)
- Last updated on June 21, 2007

Teofilo (foaled 2004) is a retired Irish Thoroughbred racehorse and active stallion. In a racing career that lasted only four months in 2006 he became the European Champion Two-Year-Old of 2006, and retired undefeated after five starts. He won two Group One races: the National Stakes in Ireland and the Dewhurst Stakes in England. He was made favourite for both the 2000 Guineas and The Derby but suffered a knee injury in April 2007 which ended his racing career. He is currently standing at stud in County Kildare.

== Background ==
Teofilo is a 16.2 hand, dark bay horse bred and trained in Ireland by Jim Bolger and owned during his racing career by Jackie Bolger. Sired by the Derby winner Galileo and the second foal of the Danehill mare Speirbhean, he was named after the Cuban Olympic boxer Teófilo Stevenson. He was ridden in all his starts by Kevin Manning.

== Racing career ==
=== 2006: two-year-old season ===
Teofilo began his career with a neck win over the Aidan O'Brien trained Red Rock Canyon in a maiden race at the Curragh. Two weeks later he was moved up to Group III class and won the Tyros Stakes at Leopardstown, beating the English colt Middleham "comfortably". Back at the Curragh, he was hard-pressed to record a narrow win the Group II Futurity Stakes, beating the future Group I winner Eagle Mountain by a head, with the rest of the field well beaten.

In his next start, he was sent for one of Ireland's most prestigious juvenile races, the Group I National Stakes. In this race he was matched against the best of Aidan O'Brien's two-year-olds Holy Roman Emperor, the winner of the Railway and Phoenix Stakes. Teofilo raced prominently, took the lead two furlongs out, and stayed on to score an "impressive" one and a quarter length win over the Ballydoyle colt, with the two finishing well clear. After the race Teofilo was the subject of the highest praise, being talked of as a potential Triple Crown winner and being described by Bolger as the best horse he had ever trained, superior to his King George VI and Queen Elizabeth Stakes winner St Jovite.

On his final start of the year, Teofilo was sent to England to contest the Dewhurst Stakes at Newmarket in which he again faced Holy Roman Emperor who had won the Prix Jean-Luc Lagardère since their last meeting. Teofilo started slowly, but was moved into the lead a furlong out. He was immediately challenged and headed by Holy Roman Emperor, but stayed on strongly to regain the lead near the line and win by a head. Immediately after the race, Teofilo was favourite for the following season's 2000 Guineas and Derby at odds of 5-2 and 4-1 respectively. Jim Bolger emphasised his opinion that whatever Teofilo had already achieved, he would be better as a three-year-old running over middle distances; "you won't see the true horse until he goes over a mile and a half".

=== 2007: three-year-old season ===
In April 2007, as Teofilo was being prepared for the 2000 Guineas when rumours began to circulate that "all was not well" Jim Bolger responded by confirming that the colt had suffered a minor setback, but was still on target. A week before the race, Teofilo was reported to be exercising impressively, reviving speculation about a Triple Crown challenge. Four days later, however, Teofilo was withdrawn from the race after suffering a knee injury in training. His connections kept him in training, with the hope of returning later in the season, but he never ran again, and his retirement was announced in August 2007.

== Race record ==
Date	Race	Dist (f)	Course	Class	Prize (£K)	Odds	Runners	Placing	Margin	Time	Jockey	Trainer	Cite
16 July 2006	Jumeirah EBF Maiden	7	Curragh	Maiden	8	8/1	10	1	Neck	1:26.30	Kevin Manning	Jim Bolger	
29 July 2006	KRA Tyros Stakes	7	Leopardstown	3	22	7/2	11	1	1.75	1:30.00	Kevin Manning	Jim Bolger	
26 August 2006	Galileo EBF Futurity Stakes	7	Curragh	2	51	6/4	7	1	Head	1:22.60	Kevin Manning	Jim Bolger	
17 September 2006	Laing O’Rourke National Stakes	7	Curragh	1	124	2/1	6	1	1.25	1:26.40	Kevin Manning	Jim Bolger	
14 October 2006	Darley Dewhurst Stakes	7	Newmarket	1	141	11/8	15	1	Head	1:26.12	Kevin Manning	Jim Bolger	

== Assessment ==
Teofilo was the highest rated European two-year-old of 2006 with a rating of 123. At the launch of the ratings, he was described by the senior Irish Handicapper Gary O'Gorman as a "monster". He was awarded the title of European Champion Two-Year-Old at the Cartier Racing Awards.

== Stud career ==
Teofilo stands as a stallion for the Darley Stud. He is based at the Kildangan Stud, County Kildare for the first part of the year, and has been "shuttled" to the Kelvinside Stud, NSW for the Southern Hemisphere breeding season.

His first offspring appeared on the racecourse in 2011, and include the Tyros Stakes winning filly Remember Alexander. In October Teofilo had his first Group One winner when Parish Hall emulated his sire by winning the Dewhurst Stakes for Jim Bolger. Other Group race winners in Teofilo's first two crops include Light Heavy (Derrinstown Stud Derby Trial), Havana Gold (Somerville Tattersall Stakes) and Loch Garman (Critérium International). On 29 June Teofilo had his most important success as a stallion when Trading Leather won the Irish Derby. On the following day Havana Gold won the Prix Jean Prat. In September 2013, Teofilo's first-crop daughter Voleuse de Coeurs won the Irish St. Leger.

Subsequent major winners for the stallion have included three time Group 1 winner Happy Clapper (Epsom Handicap, Canterbury Stakes, Doncaster Handicap), Pleascach, Arod (Summer Mile Stakes), Royal Empire (Geoffrey Freer Stakes), Special Fighter (Al Maktoum Challenge, Round 3), Humidor (Australian Cup, Memsie Stakes), Cross Counter, Twilight Payment (Melbourne Cup) and Exultant (Hong Kong Vase).

=== Major winners ===
c = colt, f = filly, g = gelding

Foaled	Name	Sex	Major wins
2009	Parish Hall	c	Dewhurst Stakes
2009	Voleuse de Coeurs	f	Irish St. Leger
2010	Happy Clapper	g	Epsom Handicap, Canterbury Stakes, Doncaster Handicap
2010	Havana Gold	c	Prix Jean Prat
2010	Quest For More	g	Prix du Cadran
2010	Loch Garman	c	Critérium International
2010	Trading Leather	c	Irish Derby
2011	Kermadec	c	Doncaster Handicap, George Main Stakes
2011	Special Fighter	c	Al Maktoum Challenge, Round 3
2012	Humidor	c	Australian Cup, Makybe Diva Stakes, Memsie Stakes
2012	Palentino	c	Australian Guineas, Makybe Diva Stakes
2012	Pleascach	f	Irish 1,000 Guineas, Yorkshire Oaks
2013	Ajman Princess	f	Prix Jean Romanet
2013	Twilight Payment	g	Melbourne Cup
2014	Exultant	g	Hong Kong Vase, Hong Kong Gold Cup, Hong Kong Champions & Chater Cup (twice), Queen Elizabeth II Cup
2015	Cross Counter	g	Melbourne Cup
2016	Donjah	f	Preis von Europa
2017	Subjectivist	c	Prix Royal-Oak, Ascot Gold Cup
2017	Tawkeel	f	Prix Saint-Alary
2017	Without A Fight	g	Caulfield Cup, Melbourne Cup
2018	Gear Up	c	Criterium de Saint-Cloud
2018	Scope	c	Prix Royal-Oak
2019	Nations Pride	c	Saratoga Derby Invitational Stakes, Bayerisches Zuchtrennen, Canadian International Stakes

== Pedigree ==
Pedigree of Teofilo (IRE), bay stallion, 2004
Sire Galileo (IRE) 1998	Sadler's Wells (USA); 1981	Northern Dancer	Nearctic
Sire Galileo (IRE) 1998	Sadler's Wells (USA); 1981	Northern Dancer	Natalma
Sire Galileo (IRE) 1998	Sadler's Wells (USA); 1981	Fairy Bridge	Bold Reason
Sire Galileo (IRE) 1998	Sadler's Wells (USA); 1981	Fairy Bridge	Special
Sire Galileo (IRE) 1998	Urban Sea (USA); 1989	Miswaki	Mr. Prospector
Sire Galileo (IRE) 1998	Urban Sea (USA); 1989	Miswaki	Hopespringeternal
Sire Galileo (IRE) 1998	Urban Sea (USA); 1989	Allegretta	Lombard
Sire Galileo (IRE) 1998	Urban Sea (USA); 1989	Allegretta	Anatevka
Dam Speirbhean (IRE) 1998	Danehill (USA); 1986	Danzig	Northern Dancer
Dam Speirbhean (IRE) 1998	Danehill (USA); 1986	Danzig	Pas de Nom
Dam Speirbhean (IRE) 1998	Danehill (USA); 1986	Razyana	His Majesty
Dam Speirbhean (IRE) 1998	Danehill (USA); 1986	Razyana	Spring Adieu
Dam Speirbhean (IRE) 1998	Saviour (USA); 1987	Majestic Light	Majestic Prince
Dam Speirbhean (IRE) 1998	Saviour (USA); 1987	Majestic Light	Irradiate
Dam Speirbhean (IRE) 1998	Saviour (USA); 1987	Victorian Queen	Victoria Park
Dam Speirbhean (IRE) 1998	Saviour (USA); 1987	Victorian Queen	Willowfield (Family: 1-n)
