= St Jovite =

American-bred Thoroughbred racehorse

- Sire: Pleasant Colony
- Grandsire: His Majesty
- Dam: Northern Sunset
- Damsire: Northfields
- Sex: Stallion
- Foaled: 1989
- Country: United States
- Colour: Dark Bay/Brown
- Breeder: Virginia Kraft Payson
- Owner: Virginia Kraft Payson
- Trainer: Jim Bolger
- Record: 11: 6-2-0
- Earnings: £870,769

Major wins
- Anglesey Stakes (1991); Irish Futurity Stakes (1991); Derrinstown Stud Derby Trial (1992); Irish Derby (1992); K. George VI & Q. Elizabeth Stakes (1992)

Awards
- Timeform rating: 135

St Jovite (11 March 1989 – 9 January 2016) was an American bred, Irish-trained Thoroughbred racehorse bred and owned by Virginia Kraft Payson. He was sired by Pleasant Colony, winner of the 1981 Kentucky Derby and Preakness Stakes. His dam, Northern Sunset, was a granddaughter of the pre-eminent sire of the 20th century, Northern Dancer.

Sent to race on European turf courses under Irish trainer Jim Bolger, in 1991 St Jovite was voted the Champion 2-year-old in Ireland after winning the Anglesey and Futurity Stakes. At three, the colt ran second to Dr Devious in the 1992 Epsom Derby. St Jovite then defeated Dr Devious by twelve lengths while setting a new Curragh Racecourse record in winning the Irish Derby. Following his win over older horses in the King George VI and Queen Elizabeth Stakes, St. Jovite ran second again by a short-head to Dr Devious in the Irish Champion Stakes.

Sent to Longchamp Racecourse in Paris, for the prestigious Prix de l'Arc de Triomphe, St Jovite finished fourth to winner, Subotica.

Retired to stud duty at Payson's farm in Lexington Kentucky, St Jovite was purchased by Michael Bowe's Greentree Stud in Newtown, County Tipperary in Ireland and stood at stud there from 2006 to his retirement in 2014. Among his notable offspring is Amerique, a winner in the United States of the San Juan Capistrano Invitational Handicap. St Jovite sired eight race winners and his offspring won prizes totalling more than $7.5 million. St Jovite was retired to Keogh's Ballysax Manor Stud Farm in The Curragh and died there on 9 January 2016.
