= Leopardstown 2,000 Guineas Trial Stakes =

Flat horse race in Ireland

- Class: Group 3
- Location: Leopardstown; County Dublin, Ireland
- Race type: Flat / Thoroughbred
- Sponsor: Ballylinch Stud
- Website: Leopardstown.com

Race information
- Distance: 7 furlongs (1,408 metres)
- Surface: Turf
- Track: Left-handed
- Qualification: Three-year-old colts and geldings
- Weight: 9 st 5 lb Penalties; 3 lb for G1 / G2 winners
- Purse: €42,500 (2021); 1st: €25,075

2,000 Guineas Trial Stakes
2026
Thesecretadversary	Power Blue	Redemption Road

Previous years
2025
Henri Matisse	Comanche Brave	Arizona Blaze
2024
Battle Cry	Samuel Colt	My Mate Alfie
2023
Hans Andersen	Bold Discovery	Carracci
2022
Dr Zempf	The Acropolis	New Energy
2021
Poetic Flare	Ace Aussie	Monaasib

2020-2011
2020
Ten Year Ticket	King Of Athens	Prince Of Naples
2019
Never No More	Madhmoon	Could Be King
2018
Gustav Klimt	Imaging	Kenya
2017
Orderofthegarter	Taj Mahal	Zorion
2016
Black Sea	Stenographer	True Solitaire
2015
Zawraq	Endless Drama	Mohaayed
2014
Go For Goal	Shining Emerald	Ebanoran
2013
Fort Knox	Dont Bother Me	High Octane
2012
Furner's Green	Akeed Wafi	Vault
2011
Dunboyne Express	Exodus	Whipless

2010-2001
2010
Noll Wallop	Viscount Nelson	Famous Warrior
2009
Recharge	Intense Focus	Born To Be King
2008
Famous Name	Moiqen	Hebridean
2007
Creachadoir	Confuchias	Summit Surge
2006
Yasoodd	Heliostatic	Rekaab
2005
Alayan	Grand Central	Gaff
2004
Grey Swallow	Meath	Amarula Ridge
2003
Refuse To Bend	Good Day Too	Dramadoir
2002
Century City	Sights On Gold	Beverly Green
2001
Dr Brendler	Derivative	Mozart

2000-1991
2000
Bach	Legal Jousting	River Sounds
1999
Saffron Walden	Mus-If	Blast Of Storm
1998
Two-Twenty-Two	Chateau Royal	Lizop
1997
Lil's Boy	Fly To The Stars	Plaza De Toros
1996
Deed Of Love	Pro Trader	Tasdid
1995
Adjareli	Oscar Schindler	Free To Speak
1994
Manntari	Kly Green	Artema
1993
Massyar	Fatherland	Nordic Fox
1992
Portico	Brief Truce	Polar Wind
1991
Bufalino	Rinka Das	George Augustus

1990-1988
1990
Lotus Pool	Old Talka River	Ben Alisky
1989
Sagamore	Vestris Abu	Lone Runner
1988
Caerwent	Saxon Cottage	Western Wolf

The Leopardstown 2,000 Guineas Trial Stakes is a Group 3 flat horse race in Ireland open to three-year-old thoroughbred colts and geldings. It is run over a distance of 7 furlongs (1,408 metres) at Leopardstown in March or April.

== History ==
The event was formerly staged at Phoenix Park under the title 2,000 Guineas Trial. It was originally contested over 7 furlongs, and for a period it held Group 3 status. It was downgraded to Listed level in 1987.

The race was transferred to Leopardstown in 1991. It was extended to a mile in 1994. It regained Group 3 status in 2005, and reverted to Listed class in 2013. The race was reduced in distance to 7 furlongs again in 2018 and upgraded to Group 3 once more in 2023.

The event can serve as a trial for various colts' Classics in Europe. The last winner to achieve victory in the Irish 2,000 Guineas was Saffron Walden in 1999. The last to win the 2,000 Guineas was Poetic Flare in 2021. The last to win the Poule d'Essai des Poulains was Henri Matisse in 2025.

== Records ==
Leading jockey since 1986 (6 wins):

- Michael Kinane – Lotus Pool (1990), Two-Twenty-Two (1998), Saffron Walden (1999), Bach (2000), Century City (2002), Alayan (2005)
- Ryan Moore - Black Sea (2016), Gustav Klimt (2018), Never No More (2019), Hans Andersen (2023), Battle Cry (2024), Henri Matisse (2025)

Leading trainer since 1986 (11 wins):

- Aidan O'Brien - Saffron Walden (1999), Bach (2000), Century City (2002), Furmer's Green (2012), Black Sea (2016), Orderofthegarter (2017), Gustav Klimt (2018), Never No More (2019), Hans Andersen (2023), Battle Cry (2024), Henri Matisse (2025)

== Winners since 1986 ==
Year	Winner	Jockey	Trainer	Time
1986	Toca Madera	Stephen Craine	Liam Browne
1987	Island Reef	Gabriel Curran	Kevin Prendergast	1:27.30
1988	Caerwent	John Reid	Vincent O'Brien	1:31.80
1989	Sagamore	David Parnell	Kevin Prendergast	1:30.80
1990	Lotus Pool	Michael Kinane	Dermot Weld	1:36.50
1991	Bufalino	Willie Supple	Jim Bolger	1:31.30
1992	Portico	Lester Piggott	Vincent O'Brien	1:33.40
1993	Massyar	Richard Hughes	John Oxx	1:31.40
1994	Manntari	Johnny Murtagh	John Oxx	1:44.90
1995	Adjareli	Johnny Murtagh	John Oxx	1:44.60
1996	Deed of Love	Kevin Manning	Jim Bolger	1:46.30
1997	Lil's Boy	Kevin Manning	Jim Bolger	1:40.60
1998	Two-Twenty-Two	Michael Kinane	Dermot Weld	1:50.60
1999	Saffron Walden	Michael Kinane	Aidan O'Brien	1:39.00
2000	Bach	Michael Kinane	Aidan O'Brien	1:49.50
2001	Dr Brendler	Fran Berry	John Hayden	1:53.60
2002	Century City	Michael Kinane	Aidan O'Brien	1:38.70
2003	Refuse to Bend	Pat Smullen	Dermot Weld	1:39.20
2004	Grey Swallow	Pat Smullen	Dermot Weld	1:51.60
2005	Alayan	Michael Kinane	John Oxx	1:51.70
2006	Yasoodd	Chris Catlin	Mick Channon	1:45.60
2007	Creachadoir	Kevin Manning	Jim Bolger	1:40.20
2008	Famous Name	Pat Smullen	Dermot Weld	1:43.95
2009	Recharge	Chris Hayes	Kevin Prendergast	1:40.65
2010	Noll Wallop	Wayne Lordan	Tommy Stack	1:47.15
2011	Dunboyne Express (Note: The 2011 winner Dunboyne Express was later exported to Hong Kong and renamed Dan Excel)	Declan McDonogh	Kevin Prendergast	1:41.36
2012	Furner's Green	Joseph O'Brien	Aidan O'Brien	1:41.97
2013	Fort Knox	Johnny Murtagh	Tommy Carmody	1:48.51
2014	Go For Goal	Pat Smullen	Dermot Weld	1:44.88
2015	Zawraq	Pat Smullen	Dermot Weld	1:52.25
2016	Black Sea	Ryan Moore	Aidan O'Brien	1:52.35
2017	Orderofthegarter	Seamie Heffernan	Aidan O'Brien	1:41.06
2018	Gustav Klimt	Ryan Moore	Aidan O'Brien	1:38.60
2019	Never No More	Ryan Moore	Aidan O'Brien	1:32.01
2020	Ten Year Ticket (Note: The 2020 race was run as the Holden Plant Rental (C & G) Trial Stakes in June due to the COVID-19 pandemic in the Republic of Ireland)	Kevin Manning	Jim Bolger	1:28.75
2021	Poetic Flare	Kevin Manning	Jim Bolger	1:28.02
2022	Dr Zempf	Colin Keane	Ger Lyons	1:30.06
2023	Hans Andersen	Ryan Moore	Aidan O'Brien	1:38.03
2024	Battle Cry (Note: The 2024 winner Battle Cry was later exported to Hong Kong and renamed Elite Alliance)	Ryan Moore	Aidan O'Brien	1:39.31
2025	Henri Matisse	Ryan Moore	Aidan O'Brien	1:28.44
2026	Thesecretadversary	Seamie Heffernan	Fozzy Stack	1:32.99

== See also ==
- Horse racing in Ireland
- List of Irish flat horse races
