= Commander in Chief (horse) =

British-bred Thoroughbred racehorse

- The second colours of Khalid Abdullah, carried by Commander in Chief in the 1993 Derby
- Sire: Dancing Brave
- Grandsire: Lyphard
- Dam: Slightly Dangerous
- Damsire: Roberto
- Sex: Stallion
- Foaled: 18 May 1990
- Country: Great Britain
- Colour: Bay or brown
- Breeder: Juddmonte Farms
- Owner: Khalid Abdullah
- Trainer: Henry Cecil
- Record: 6: 5-0-1
- Earnings: $1,579,300

Major wins
- Glasgow Stakes (1993); Epsom Derby (1993); Irish Derby Stakes (1993)

Awards
- European Three-Year-Old Champion Colt (1993)
- Last updated on February 3, 2007

Commander in Chief (1990–2007) was a British thoroughbred racehorse and sire. In a career that lasted just over three months in the spring and summer of 1993 he won five of his six races, most notably the Derby at Epsom and the Irish Derby at the Curragh. He was the first Derby winner since Morston in 1973 not to have raced as a two-year-old. Furthermore, the Racing Post had not even included him in their list of horses for the 1993 Ten-to-Follow on the flat competition. Commander in Chief was voted the 1993 Cartier Champion Three-year-old Colt.

== Background ==
Commander in Chief was a dark bay colt (officially "bay or brown") with a white snip, bred by his owner's Juddmonte Farms breeding organisation. He was sired by Dancing Brave out of Slightly Dangerous. Dancing Brave was the most highly rated British racehorse of the 1980s winning a series of major races culminating in the Prix de l'Arc de Triomphe. At stud, he was a modest success, siring the Group One winners White Muzzle, Wemyss Bight and Cherokee Rose before being sold and exported to Japan in 1991. Slightly Dangerous finished second in the 1982 Epsom Oaks and went on to be an outstanding broodmare, producing the Group One/Grade I winners Warning and Yashmak as well as the Epsom Derby runner-up Dushyantor.

Commander in Chief was trained for all his starts by Henry Cecil at his Warren Place stable at Newmarket, Suffolk. He was ridden in all of his races other than the Derby by the eleven times Champion Jockey Pat Eddery.

== Racing career ==
=== Early races ===
Commander in Chief did not run as a two-year-old and made his debut in April 1993 in a ten furlong maiden race at the Newmarket Craven meeting. Starting the even money favourite he took the lead a furlong from the finish and drew away from the rest of the field, winning by six lengths despite being eased down in the closing stages. Eighteen days late he returned to Newmarket for the twelve furlong Culford Stakes. On this occasion he started 2/5 favourite and won by three and a half lengths from Oakmead and Blue Judge. On the 13 May he completed his hat-trick in the Glasgow Stakes at York, but in this race he was less impressive: Eddery attempted to make all the running on the 2/9 favourite, and he had to be pushed out in the closing stages to win by a neck from Needle Gun.

=== Epsom Derby ===
Commander in Chief went into the 1993 Epsom Derby on 2 June as an unbeaten horse, but one who had never contested a Group Race. He was the youngest of the sixteen runners in a race which attracted a crowd of 106,000. In the build-up to the race he had been overshadowed by his stable companion Tenby. Owned like Commander in Chief by Khalid Abdullah and also unbeaten, Tenby's successes had come in more high-profile races such as the Grand Critérium and the Dante Stakes and he was made 4/5 favourite. He was the preferred ride of Pat Eddery, leaving the ride on Commander in Chief to Mick Kinane. Commander in Chief who started 15/2 second favourite, was held up in the early stages and turned into the straight in sixth place. He then made rapid progress to take the lead two furlongs out and quickly went clear. He was never in any danger and won very easily by three and a half lengths from the 150/1 outsiders Blue Judge and Blues Traveller. Tenby, who had been in second place at one point, weakened badly in the straight and finished tenth.

=== After Epsom ===
On 27 June Commander in Chief traveled to the Curragh for the Irish Derby. The build-up and betting suggested that the race would effectively be a match between Commander in Chief (4/7 favourite) and the French-trained Hernando, the winner of the Prix du Jockey Club who started at 9/4. The two colts duly came to the front two furlongs out and raced together throughout the closing stages. The English colt however, proved the superior horse on the day and won by three quarters of a length. After the race Eddery said that the winner was comparable to "all the good ones I've ridden", while Cecil described him as "a late maturing sort" for whom "the best is yet to come". On 24 July, Commander in Chief, now undefeated in five races, started 7/4 favourite for the King George VI and Queen Elizabeth Stakes at Ascot, in which he took on older horses for the first time. His main rivals included the 1992 European Horse of the Year User Friendly, the five-year-old Opera House who had recently won the Eclipse Stakes and White Muzzle a three-year-old who had won his last five races including the Derby Italiano. Commander in Chief raced prominently and took the lead in the straight, but in the closing stages he was overtaken and beaten one and a half lengths and a short head by Opera House and White Muzzle.

Commander in Chief did not race again, and in October it was announced that he had been sold to stand as a stallion in Japan.

== Assessment and honours ==
In the 1993 Cartier Racing Awards, Commander in Chief was voted European Three-Year-Old Champion Colt. In the official International Classification for 1993 he was rated on 127, equal with White Muzzle and three pounds below the top-rated three-year-old Zafonic. Commander in Chief was rated at 130 for his Derby win by Timeform.

In their book A Century of Champions, John Randall and Tony Morris rated Commander in Chief as an "inferior" Derby winner.

== Stud career ==
Commander in Chief was the leading first-season sire in Japan in 1997. His best offspring included Rascal Suzuka, who finished second in the 2000 Spring Tenno Sho, and Ein Bride, the Japanese champion two-year-old filly. He died at the Yushun Stallion Station in Japan in 2007 after fracturing his leg in a paddock accident.

== Pedigree ==
Pedigree of Commander in Chief (GB) bay or brown stallion 1990
| Sire Dancing Brave (USA) 1983 | Lyphard (USA); 1969 | Northern Dancer | Nearctic |
| Sire Dancing Brave (USA) 1983 | Lyphard (USA); 1969 | Northern Dancer | Natalma |
| Sire Dancing Brave (USA) 1983 | Lyphard (USA); 1969 | Goofed | Court Martial |
| Sire Dancing Brave (USA) 1983 | Lyphard (USA); 1969 | Goofed | Barra |
| Sire Dancing Brave (USA) 1983 | Navajo Princess (USA); 1974 | Drone | Sir Gaylord |
| Sire Dancing Brave (USA) 1983 | Navajo Princess (USA); 1974 | Drone | Cap and Bells |
| Sire Dancing Brave (USA) 1983 | Navajo Princess (USA); 1974 | Olmec | Pago Pago |
| Sire Dancing Brave (USA) 1983 | Navajo Princess (USA); 1974 | Olmec | Chocolate Beau |
| Dam Slightly Dangerous (USA) 1979 | Roberto (USA); 1969 | Hail to Reason | Turn-To |
| Dam Slightly Dangerous (USA) 1979 | Roberto (USA); 1969 | Hail to Reason | Nothirdchance |
| Dam Slightly Dangerous (USA) 1979 | Roberto (USA); 1969 | Bramalea | Nashua |
| Dam Slightly Dangerous (USA) 1979 | Roberto (USA); 1969 | Bramalea | Rarelea |
| Dam Slightly Dangerous (USA) 1979 | Where You Lead (USA); 1970 | Raise a Native | Native Dancer |
| Dam Slightly Dangerous (USA) 1979 | Where You Lead (USA); 1970 | Raise a Native | Raise You |
| Dam Slightly Dangerous (USA) 1979 | Where You Lead (USA); 1970 | Noblesse | Mossborough |
| Dam Slightly Dangerous (USA) 1979 | Where You Lead (USA); 1970 | Noblesse | Duke's Delight (Family 14-f) |
