= Trading Leather =

Irish-bred Thoroughbred racehorse

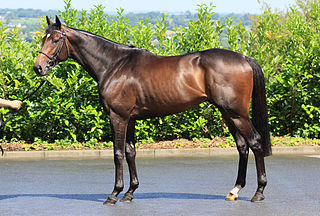
- Sire: Teofilo
- Grandsire: Galileo
- Dam: Night Visit
- Damsire: Sinndar
- Sex: Colt
- Foaled: 20 March 2010
- Died: 30 November 2014
- Country: Ireland
- Colour: Bay
- Breeder: Jim Bolger
- Owner: Jackie Bolger; Godolphin
- Trainer: Jim Bolger
- Record: 16: 4-5-4
- Earnings: £1,363,985

Major wins
- Autumn Stakes (2012); Silver Stakes (2013); Irish Derby (2013)

Trading Leather (20 March 2010 – 30 November 2014) was an Irish Thoroughbred racehorse best known for winning the 2013 Irish Derby. The horse died following an injury sustained in the 2014 Japan Cup.

== Background ==
Trading Leather was a dark-coated bay colt with a white star bred by his trainer, Jim Bolger. He was from the second crop of foals sired by the undefeated Teofilo, the European Champion Two-Year-Old of 2006.

Like his sire, Trading Leather was trained by Bolger in County Carlow and was ridden in all of his races by Bolger's stable jockey, Kevin Manning. In his first two seasons, he raced in the colours of Jim Bolger's wife, Jackie Bolger.

== Racing career ==
=== 2012: two-year-old season ===
On his racecourse debut, Trading Leather ran in the Listed Breeders' Cup Juvenile Turf Trial Stakes over one mile at Leopardstown Racecourse on 8 September. He started a 14/1 outsider and finished second to the odds on favourite Battle of Marengo. Two weeks later at Gowran Park, the colt was dropped in class to contest a maiden race and recorded his first victory with a seven-lengthwin from fifteen opponents. Trading Leather was then sent to England for the Group Three Autumn Stakes over the Rowley Mile course on 13 October. He started the 5/2 joint-favourite and won by three-quarters of a length from the Richard Hannon Sr.-trained Montiridge, with the other beaten horses including Eye of the Storm, Glory Awaits, and Galileo Rock. On his final start of the season, the colt started second favourite for the Group One Racing Post Trophy at Doncaster Racecourse but after leading for five furlongs, he faded to finish fifth behind Kingsbarns.

=== 2013: three-year-old season ===
On his three-year-old debut, Trading Leather ran his third consecutive race in Britain when he contested the Dante Stakes over 10 1/2 furlongs at York Racecourse in May. He finished second of the eight runners, 1 1/4 lengths behind 33/1 outsider Libertarian. Eleven days later, he was dropped back in distance to contest the Irish 2,000 Guineas at the Curragh. he led from the start but was overtaken a furlong from the finish and finished third to the Aidan O'Brien-trained Magician.

Trading Leather missed the Epsom Derby and was dropped to Listed class for the Silver Stake over ten furlongs at the Curragh. He took the lead a quarter of a mile from the finish and won by 3 1/2 lengths from UAE Derby winner Lines of Battle. On 29 June, Trading Leather was one of nine colts to contest the 148th running of the Irish Derby over 1 1/2 miles at the Curragh. He started at odds of 6/1 in a field which included Ruler of the World, Libertarian, and Galileo Rock, the first three finishers in the Epsom Derby. Manning settled the colt behind the leaders before moving up to take the lead a furlong and a half from the finish. In the closing stage, he stayed on well under pressure to win by 1 3/4 lengths from Galileo Rock. Trading Leather's victory, which came in a fast time of 2:27.17, was a second for Jim Bolger and a first for Manning, who said that the colt "gallops and keeps galloping, I was getting there all the way up the straight. This win means everything to me."

On 27 July, Trading Leather was sent to the United Kingdom to contest the country's most prestigious weight-for-age race, the King George VI and Queen Elizabeth Stakes, over 1 1/2 miles at Ascot Racecourse. Manning tracked the leaders before moving up to contest the lead in the straight. Trading Leather was quickly overtaken by the German colt Novellist but held on to take second place by three quarters of a length from the British colt Hillstar. Trading Leather and Hillstart met again at York Racecourse in August for the International Stakes, which also attracted Al Kazeem, Toronado, and Declaration of War. Manning sent the colt into the lead from the start before accelerating early in the straight. He was overtaken approaching the final furlong but stayed on to finish second, 1 1/4 lengths behind Declaration of War. On 7 September, Trading Leather faced Al Kazeem again in the Irish Champion Stakes at Leopardstown. Racing on softer ground than he had previously encountered, he led the field until the last quarter mile before finishing third, beaten 1 1/4 lengths and two lengths by The Fugue and Al Kazeem.

=== 2014: four-year-old season ===
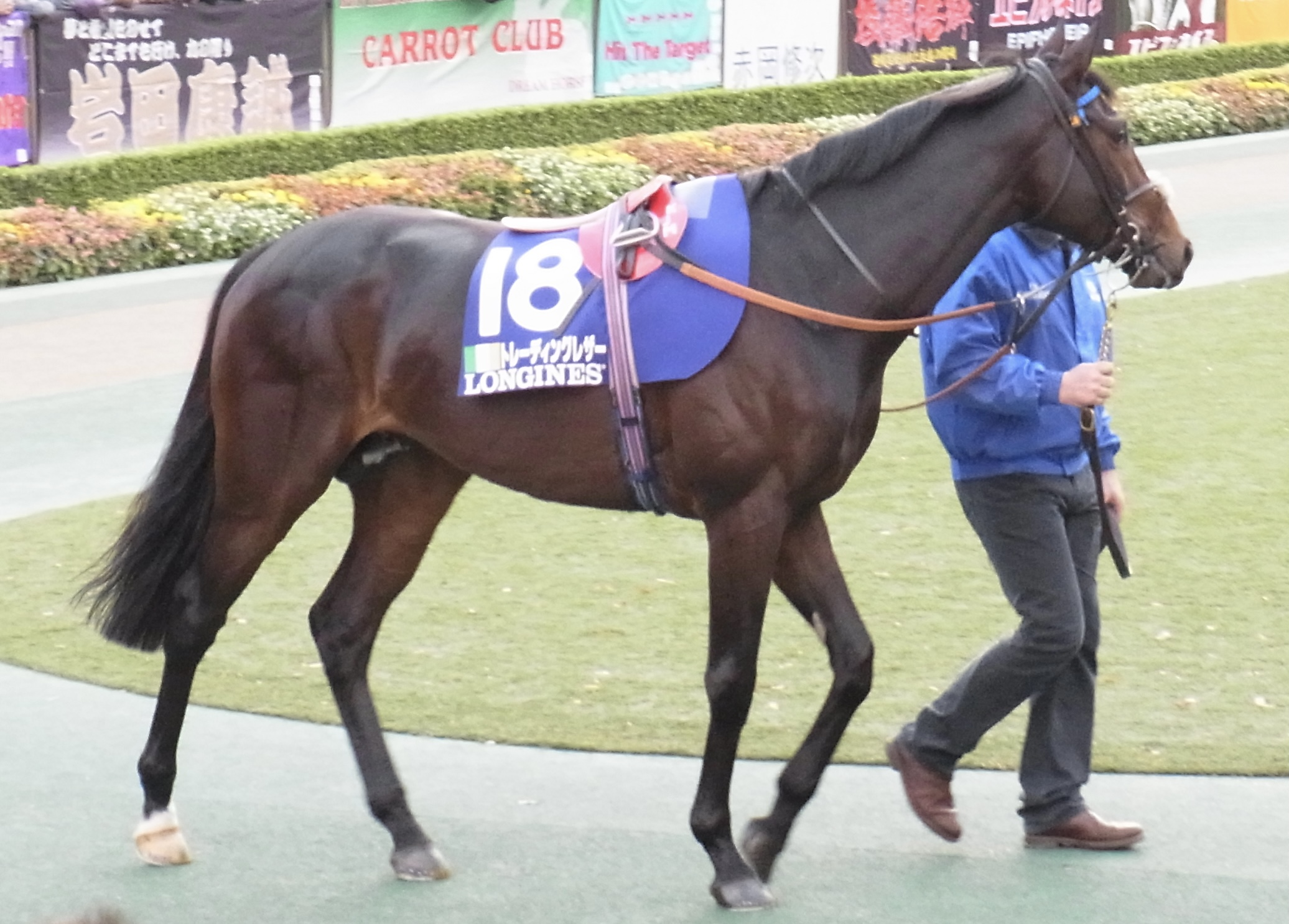
Trading Leather on the day of his death, shortly before running in the Japan Cup.

Before the start of the 2014 season, Trading Leather was sold to Sheikh Mohammed's Godolphin Racing but remained in training with Jim Bolger. On his first appearance as a four-year-old, Trading Leather started the 4/6 favourite for the Jockey Club Stakes at Newmarket on 3 May. Restrained by Manning in the early stages, he made progress in the last quarter mile without ever looking likely to win and finished third behind Gospel Choir and Pether's Moon. After a break of more than two months, the colt returned in the Eclipse Stakes at Sandown Park Racecourse. Trading Leather raced in third place for most of the race before staying on in the straight to finish second, two lengths behind the winner Mukhadram. Further back in the field were Kingston Hill, The Fugue, War Command, Night of Thunder and Verrazano. On 26 July, he started at odds of 8/1 for Britain's most prestigious weight-for-age race the King George VI and Queen Elizabeth Stakes and finished fifth of the eight runners, eleven lengths behind the winner Taghrooda.

Trading Leather was brought back in distance for the Irish Champion Stakes on 13 September. Starting at odds of 20/1, he kept on well in the straight without ever looking likely to win, finishing third behind the three-year-olds The Grey Gatsby and Australia, with Mukhadram and Al Kazeem in fourth and fifth.

Trading Leather's final run of the season was in the Japan Cup on 30 November. He went lame half a mile from home and was immediately dismounted by jockey Manning. It was announced after the race the horse had suffered a serious fracture to a leg and was put down.

== Pedigree ==
Pedigree of Trading Leather (IRE), bay colt, 2010
Sire Teofilo (IRE) 2004	Galileo (IRE); 1998	Sadler's Wells	Northern Dancer
Sire Teofilo (IRE) 2004	Galileo (IRE); 1998	Sadler's Wells	Fairy Bridge
Sire Teofilo (IRE) 2004	Galileo (IRE); 1998	Urban Sea	Miswaki
Sire Teofilo (IRE) 2004	Galileo (IRE); 1998	Urban Sea	Allegretta
Sire Teofilo (IRE) 2004	Speirbhean (IRE); 1998	Danehill	Danzig
Sire Teofilo (IRE) 2004	Speirbhean (IRE); 1998	Danehill	Razyana
Sire Teofilo (IRE) 2004	Speirbhean (IRE); 1998	Saviour	Majestic Light
Sire Teofilo (IRE) 2004	Speirbhean (IRE); 1998	Saviour	Victorian Queen
Dam Night Visit (GB) 2004	Sinndar (IRE); 1997	Grand Lodge	Chief's Crown
Dam Night Visit (GB) 2004	Sinndar (IRE); 1997	Grand Lodge	La Papagena
Dam Night Visit (GB) 2004	Sinndar (IRE); 1997	Sinntara	Lashkari
Dam Night Visit (GB) 2004	Sinndar (IRE); 1997	Sinntara	Sidama
Dam Night Visit (GB) 2004	Moonlight Sail (USA); 1998	Irish River	Riverman
Dam Night Visit (GB) 2004	Moonlight Sail (USA); 1998	Irish River	Irish Star
Dam Night Visit (GB) 2004	Moonlight Sail (USA); 1998	Cadeaux d'Amie	Lyphard
Dam Night Visit (GB) 2004	Moonlight Sail (USA); 1998	Cadeaux d'Amie	Tananarive (Family: 25)
