= Kevin Manning (jockey) =

Retired Irish flat racing jockey

Personal information
- Born: Kilsallaghan, County Dublin
- Occupation: Jockey

Horse racing career
- Sport: Horse racing

Major racing wins
- British Classic Race wins: 1000 Guineas (2007); 2000 Guineas (2013, 2021); Epsom Derby (2008); Irish Classic Race wins: Irish Oaks (2008); Irish Derby (2013); Irish 1000 Guineas (2015)

Significant horses
- Teofilo, New Approach, Finsceal Beo, Alexander Goldrun, Dawn Approach , Trading Leather, Pleascach, Poetic Flare

Kevin James Manning (born March 1967) is a retired Irish flat racing jockey. Manning rode principally for the stable of Jim Bolger. He won both the Epsom Derby and the Irish Derby.

Manning was champion flat racing apprentice jockey in Ireland on two occasions and was appointed as stable jockey to Jim Bolger in 1993. Manning won his first Group 1 race on Eva Luna in the 1994 Phoenix Stakes and his first classic race victory came in the 2002 Irish Oaks on Margarula. He won major races in Ireland, Britain, France and Hong Kong, notably on the filly Alexander Goldrun who won 5 Group 1 races .

Manning's highest profile victory came in 2008 when he rode New Approach to a half-length victory over Tartan Bearer in the Derby. He subsequently won the Irish Champion Stakes and English Champion Stakes on New Approach who is now a leading sire. He has also won the Gr 1 Dewhurst Stakes on 5 occasions.

In 2013 Manning won the 2000 Guineas & St James' Palace Stakes on New Approach's son Dawn Approach. He won the same races in 2021 on Poetic Flare.

Manning is married to Bolger's daughter, Úna. The couple have two children.

== Major wins ==
(Republic of Ireland) Ireland

- Irish Champion Stakes - (1) - New Approach (2008)
- Irish 1,000 Guineas - (2) - Finsceal Beo (2007), Pleascach (2015)
- Irish Derby - (1) - Trading Leather (2013)
- Irish Oaks - (1) - Margarula (2002)
- Matron Stakes - (2) - Dazzling Park (1999), Lush Lashes (2008)
- Moyglare Stud Stakes - (1) Saoirse Abu (2007)
- Phoenix Stakes - (2) - Eva Luna (1994), Saoirse Abu (2007)
- Pretty Polly Stakes - (3) Nora Abu - Alexander Goldrun (2005, 2006)
- Tattersalls Gold Cup - (1) - Perfect Imposter (1994)
- Vincent O'Brien National Stakes - (4) - Teofilo (2006), New Approach (2007), Dawn Approach (2012), Verbal Dexterity (2017)

France

- Critérium International - (1) - Loch Garman (2012)
- Prix Marcel Boussac - (1) - Finsceal Beo (2006)
- Prix de l'Opéra - (1) - Alexander Goldrun (2004)

(United Kingdom) Great Britain

- 1,000 Guineas - (1) - Finsceal Beo (2007)
- 2,000 Guineas - (2) - Dawn Approach (2013), Poetic Flare (2021)
- Champion Stakes - (1) - New Approach (2008)
- Coronation Stakes - (1) - Lush Lashes (2008)
- Dewhurst Stakes - (5) - Teofilo (2006), New Approach (2007), Intense Focus (2008), Parish Hall (2011), Dawn Approach (2012)
- Epsom Derby - (1) - New Approach (2008)
- Nassau Stakes - (1) - Alexander Goldrun (2005)
- St. James's Palace Stakes - (2) - Dawn Approach (2013), Poetic Flare (2021)
- Vertem Futurity Trophy - (1) - Mac Swiney (2020)
- Yorkshire Oaks - (2) - Lush Lashes (2008), Pleascach (2015)

Hong Kong

- Hong Kong Cup - (1) - Alexander Goldrun (2004)
