= Vincent O'Brien National Stakes =

- Class: Group 1
- Location: Curragh Racecourse; County Kildare, Ireland
- Inaugurated: 1849
- Race type: Flat / Thoroughbred
- Sponsor: Goffs
- Website: Curragh

Race information
- Distance: 7f (1,408 metres)
- Surface: Turf
- Track: Right-hand elbow
- Qualification: Two-year-olds excluding geldings
- Weight: 9 st 3 lb Allowances; 3 lb for fillies
- Purse: €376,000 (2022); 1st: €236,000

National Stakes
2026
Folsom Blues	Monogram	Florida Bay

Previous years
2025
Zavateri	Gstaad	Italy
2024
Scorthy Champ	Henri Matisse	Seagulls Eleven
2023
Henry Longfellow	Islandsinthestream	Bucanero Fuerte
2022
Al Riffa	Proud And Regal	Shartash
2021
Native Trail	Point Lonsdale	Ebro River

2020-2011
2020
Thunder Moon	Wembley	St Mark's Basilica
2019
Pinatubo	Armory	Arizona
2018
Quorto	Anthony Van Dyck	Christmas
2017
Verbal Dexterity	Beckford	Rostropovich
2016
Churchill	Mehmas	Lockheed
2015
Air Force Blue	Herald The Dawn	Birchwood
2014
Gleneagles	Toscanini	Dutch Connection
2013
Toormore	Sudirman	Giovanni Boldini
2012
Dawn Approach	Designs On Rome	Leitir Mor
2011
Power	Dragon Pulse	David Livingston

2010-2001
2010
Pathfork	Casamento	Zoffany
2009
Kingsfort	Chabal	Beethoven
2008
Mastercraftsman	Shaweel	Arazan
2007
New Approach	Rio De La Plata	Myboycharlie
2006
Teofilo	Holy Roman Emperor	Eyshal
2005
George Washington	Golden Arrow	Heatseeker
2004
Dubawi	Berenson	Russian Blue
2003
One Cool Cat	Wathab	Pearl of Love
2002
Refuse To Bend	Van Nistelrooy	Dublin
2001
Hawk Wing	Naheef	Sholokhov

2000-1991
2000
Beckett	King's County	March King
1999
Sinndar	Murawwi	Jammaal
1998
Mus-If	Coliseum	Festival Hall
1997
King Of Kings	Celtic Cavalier	Mountain Song
1996
Desert King	Referendum	Azra
1995
Danehill Dancer	Polaris Flight	Force Of Will
1994
Definite Article	Manashar	Desert Style
1993
Manntari	City Nights	State Performer
1992
Fatherland	Maroof	Khoraz
1991
El Prado	Nordic Brief	Mekong

1990-1988
1990
Heart Of Darkness	Malvernico	Prodigal Blues
1989
Dashing Blade	Wedding Bouquet	Book The Band
1988
Classic Fame	Always Valiant	Stone Flake

The Vincent O'Brien National Stakes is a Group 1 flat horse race in Ireland open to two-year-old thoroughbred colts and fillies. It is run at the Curragh over a distance of 7 furlongs (1,408 metres), and it is scheduled to take place each year in September.

== History ==
The event was established in 1849, and it was originally called the National Produce Stakes and then the National Stakes. The inaugural running was won by Chatterbox.

For a period the National Stakes was classed at Group 2 level, and it was promoted to Group 1 in 1985. It was extended from 7 furlongs to a mile in 1997, but its former distance was restored in 2000.

The race became known as the Vincent O'Brien National Stakes in 2009, in memory of the successful trainer Vincent O'Brien (1917–2009). It reverted to its previous title in 2011 but was renamed the Vincent O'Brien Stakes in 2012. In 2014 the title reverted to the Vincent O'Brien National Stakes and it became part of the Irish Champions Weekend fixture.

The National Stakes was formerly part of the Breeders' Cup Challenge series, with the winner earning an automatic invitation to compete in the Breeders' Cup Juvenile Turf. It was removed from the series in 2012.

== Records ==
Leading jockey since 1947 (4 wins):

- Lester Piggott – Cellini (1973), Sir Wimborne (1975), El Prado (1991), Fatherland (1992)
- Michael Kinane – Definite Article (1994), Mus-If (1998), Hawk Wing (2001), One Cool Cat (2003)

Leading trainer since 1947 (15 wins):

- Vincent O'Brien – Sir Ivor (1967), Roberto (1971), Chamozzle (1972), Cellini (1973), Sir Wimborne (1975), Monteverdi (1979), Storm Bird (1980), Glenstal (1982), El Gran Senor (1983), Law Society (1984), Tate Gallery (1985), Caerwent (1987), Classic Fame (1988), El Prado (1991), Fatherland (1992)

Leading owner since 1976 (12 wins): (includes part ownership)

- Michael Tabor – Danehill Dancer (1995), Desert King (1996), King of Kings (1997), Beckett (2000), One Cool Cat (2003), George Washington (2005), Mastercraftsman (2008), Power (2011), Gleneagles (2014), Air Force Blue (2015), Churchill (2016), Henry Longfellow (2023)

== Winners since 1976 ==
Year	Winner	Jockey	Trainer	Owner	Time
1976	Pampapaul	John Corr	Stuart Murless	Hans Paul	1:26.00
1977	Diamonds Are Trump	Wally Swinburn	Dermot Weld	Bertram Firestone	1:26.30
1978	Tap On Wood	Ernie Johnson	Barry Hills	Tony Shead	1:28.00
1979	Monteverdi	Raymond Carroll	Vincent O'Brien	Robert Sangster	1:30.50
1980	Storm Bird	Tommy Murphy	Vincent O'Brien	Robert Sangster	1:28.10
1981	Day Is Done	Wally Swinburn	Dermot Weld	Bertram Firestone	1:28.20
1982	Glenstal	Vincent Rossiter	Vincent O'Brien	Robert Sangster	1:29.00
1983	El Gran Senor	Pat Eddery	Vincent O'Brien	Robert Sangster	1:28.10
1984	Law Society	Pat Eddery	Vincent O'Brien	Stavros Niarchos	1:26.30
1985	Tate Gallery	Cash Asmussen	Vincent O'Brien	Stavros Niarchos	1:28.80
1986	Lockton	Michael Hills	Jeremy Hindley	Alan Gibson	1:25.70
1987	Caerwent	Cash Asmussen	Vincent O'Brien	Sir Edmund Loder	1:32.20
1988	Classic Fame	John Reid	Vincent O'Brien	Classic Thoroughbred plc	1:28.00
1989	Dashing Blade	John Matthias	Ian Balding	Jeff Smith	1:25.20
1990	Heart of Darkness	Pat Shanahan	Ian Balding	Paul Mellon	1:23.10
1991	El Prado	Lester Piggott	Vincent O'Brien	Robert Sangster	1:24.40
1992	Fatherland	Lester Piggott	Vincent O'Brien	Jacqueline O'Brien	1:33.70
1993	Manntari	Johnny Murtagh	John Oxx	HH Aga Khan IV	1:29.70
1994	Definite Article	Michael Kinane	Dermot Weld	Moyglare Stud Farm	1:31.10
1995	Danehill Dancer	Pat Eddery	Neville Callaghan	Michael Tabor	1:24.10
1996	Desert King	Walter Swinburn	Aidan O'Brien	Michael Tabor	1:25.70
1997	King of Kings	Christy Roche	Aidan O'Brien	Magnier / Tabor	1:43.30
1998	Mus-If	Michael Kinane	Dermot Weld	Hamdan Al Maktoum	1:41.50
1999	Sinndar	Johnny Murtagh	John Oxx	HH Aga Khan IV	1:46.20
2000	Beckett	Seamie Heffernan	Aidan O'Brien	Magnier / Tabor	1:29.80
2001	Hawk Wing	Michael Kinane	Aidan O'Brien	Sue Magnier	1:20.90
2002	Refuse to Bend	Pat Smullen	Dermot Weld	Moyglare Stud Farm	1:26.00
2003	One Cool Cat	Michael Kinane	Aidan O'Brien	Magnier / Tabor	1:23.10
2004	Dubawi	Frankie Dettori	Saeed bin Suroor	Godolphin	1:24.80
2005	George Washington	Kieren Fallon	Aidan O'Brien	Magnier / Tabor / Smith	1:23.70
2006	Teofilo	Kevin Manning	Jim Bolger	Jackie Bolger	1:26.40
2007	New Approach	Kevin Manning	Jim Bolger	Bolger / Sheikh Moh'd	1:23.51
2008	Mastercraftsman	Johnny Murtagh	Aidan O'Brien	Smith / Magnier / Tabor	1:37.59
2009	Kingsfort	Declan McDonogh	Kevin Prendergast	Norman Ormiston	1:33.63
2010	Pathfork	Fran Berry	Jessica Harrington	Silverton Hill Partnership	1:27.95
2011	Power	Seamie Heffernan	Aidan O'Brien	Tabor / Smith / Magnier	1:27.74
2012	Dawn Approach	Kevin Manning	Jim Bolger	Godolphin	1:25.50
2013	Toormore	Richard Hughes	Richard Hannon Sr.	Middleham Park Racing IX & James Pak	1:22.67
2014	Gleneagles	Joseph O'Brien	Aidan O'Brien	Tabor / Smith / Magnier	1:25.29
2015	Air Force Blue	Joseph O'Brien	Aidan O'Brien	Tabor / Smith / Magnier	1:29.89
2016	Churchill	Ryan Moore	Aidan O'Brien	Tabor / Smith / Magnier	1:28.28
2017	Verbal Dexterity	Kevin Manning	Jim Bolger	Jackie Bolger	1:27.32
2018	Quorto	William Buick	Charlie Appleby	Godolphin	1:24.81
2019	Pinatubo	William Buick	Charlie Appleby	Godolphin	1:21.82
2020	Thunder Moon	Declan McDonogh	Joseph Patrick O'Brien	Chantal Regalado-Gonzalez	1:28.53
2021	Native Trail	William Buick	Charlie Appleby	Godolphin	1:26.27
2022	Al Riffa	Dylan Browne McMonagle	Joseph O'Brien	Jassim Bin Ali Al Attiyah	1:29.31
2023	Henry Longfellow	Ryan Moore	Aidan O'Brien	Tabor / Smith / Magnier	1:27.54
2024	Scorthy Champ	Dylan Browne McMonagle	Joseph O'Brien	Rectory Road Holdings & B Fowler & Mrs A M O'Brien	1:25.08
2025	Zavateri	Charles Bishop	Eve Johnson Houghton	Mick & Janice Mariscotti	1:26.73
2026	Folsom Blues	Joey Sheridan	Joseph O'Brien	Al Shira'aa Racing Limited	1:27.80

== Earlier winners ==
- 1849: Chatterbox
- 1850: Third of May
- 1851: Barbarian
- 1852: The Deformed
- 1853: Knight of St George
- 1855: Citron
- 1857: Barbary
- 1858: Mount Zion
- 1859: Good Boy
- 1869: The Tyrconnell
- 1870: Maid of Athens
- 1871: Prodigal
- 1872: Queen of the Bees
- 1877: Inamorata
- 1880: Barcaldine
- 1886: Gallinule
- 1891: Red Prince
- 1895: Chit Chat
- 1897: Sirenia
- 1900: St Helena
- 1901: Bachelor's Button
- 1906: Silver Fowl
- 1907: Americus Girl
- 1909: Kilbroney
- 1912: Royal Weaver
- 1914: Offaly
- 1915: Ayn Hali
- 1918: Grand Parade
- 1920: Soldennis
- 1923: Vesington Star
- 1927: Athford
- 1928: Soloptic
- 1929: Ballyferis
- 1933: Cariff
- 1944: Solid Pact
- 1947: Morning Wings
- 1948: Tribal Song
- 1949: First View
- 1950: Star Wire
- 1951: Blue Butterfly
- 1952: Sea Charger
- 1953: Calvero
- 1954: Panaslipper
- 1955: Black Patch
- 1956: El Minzah
- 1957: Talmud
- 1958: Babu
- 1959: His Story
- 1960: Paris Princess
- 1961: Mystery
- 1962: Partholon
- 1963: Santa Claus
- 1964: Prominer
- 1965: Reubens
- 1966: House Proud
- 1967: Sir Ivor
- 1968: Thataboy
- 1969: Decies
- 1970: King's Company
- 1971: Roberto
- 1972: Chamozzle
- 1973: Cellini
- 1974: Reap the Wind
- 1975: Sir Wimborne

== See also ==
- Horse racing in Ireland
- List of Irish flat horse races
- Recurring sporting events established in 1849 – this race is included under its original title, National Produce Stakes.
