= Jim Bolger (racehorse trainer) =

Irish racehorse trainer and breeder

- Born: 25 December 1941 (age 84); Oylegate, County Wexford, Ireland
- Occupation: Horse trainer

James S. Bolger (born 25 December 1941) is a thoroughbred racehorse trainer and breeder based in Coolcullen in County Kilkenny. For many years, he has been recognised as one of the racing greats in Ireland. Aidan O'Brien, Tony McCoy and Paul Carberry were all apprenticed to him before gaining professional recognition in their own right.

During the 2006 flat season, Bolger trained Teofilo to go unbeaten at the age of two. This five-race unbeaten streak included victories in the Group 1 National Stakes and Dewhurst Stakes. Talk of an English Triple Crown bid was imminent, but Teofilo suffered a career-ending injury in the lead up to the 2,000 Guineas and never saw a racecourse again. Bolger was criticized for his handling of this situation.

2007 saw another Bolger-bred star emerge in the shape of New Approach. He followed the same path as Teofilo during his two-year-old career and was unbeaten. In 2008, Bolger informed the public that New Approach would go to Newmarket for the Guineas followed by a trip to the Curragh for the Irish 2,000 Guineas and then on for a tilt at the Irish Derby. New Approach finished second in both Guineas, however, behind the Ballydoyle trained Henrythenavigator. It then emerged that at the latest Epsom Derby forfeit stage, New Approach's name had been left in by mistake. A week later, Bolger revealed that his horse would go to Epsom after all, which led to much criticism from punters and bookmakers alike. However, New Approach won the English Derby by a half length, beating the Sir Michael Stoute-trained Tartan Bearer.

== Major training wins ==
(Republic of Ireland) Ireland

- Irish 1,000 Guineas - (2) - Finsceal Beo (2007), Pleascach (2015)
- Irish 2,000 Guineas - (1) - Mac Swiney (2021)
- Irish Champion Stakes - (2) - Park Express (1986), New Approach (2008)
- Irish Derby - (2) - St Jovite (1992), Trading Leather (2013)
- Irish Oaks - (2) - Give Thanks (1983), Margarula (2002)
- Matron Stakes - (3) - Upward Trend (1989), Dazzling Park (1999), Lush Lashes (2008)
- Moyglare Stud Stakes - (3) - Park Appeal (1984), Priory Belle (1995), Saoirse Abu (2007)
- Vincent O'Brien National Stakes - (4) - Teofilo (2006), New Approach (2007), Dawn Approach (2012), Verbal Dexterity (2017)
- Phoenix Stakes - (3) - Eva Luna (1994), Mantovani (1996), Saoirse Abu (2007)
- Pretty Polly Stakes - (4) - Flame of Tara (1983), Noora Abu (1989), Alexander Goldrun (2005, 2006)
- Tattersalls Gold Cup - (2) - Erins Isle (1981), Perfect Imposter (1994)
- Irish Champion Hurdle - (2) - Nordic Surprise (1991), Chirkpar (1992)
- Champion Four Year Old Hurdle - (2) - Clarinbridge (1984), Orbis (1990)
- Herald Champion Novice Hurdle - (1) - Vestris Abu (1990)
- Racing Post Novice Chase - (1) - Chirkpar (1993)
- Slaney Novice Hurdle - (1) - Nordic Surprise (1991)

France

- Critérium International - (1) - Loch Garman (2012)
- Prix de l'Abbaye de Longchamp - (1) - Polonia (1987)
- Prix Marcel Boussac - (1) - Finsceal Beo (2006)
- Prix de l'Opéra - (1) - Alexander Goldrun (2004)

(United Kingdom) Great Britain

- 1000 Guineas - (1) - Finsceal Beo (2007)
- 2000 Guineas - (2) - Dawn Approach (2013), Poetic Flare (2021)
- Champion Stakes - (1) - New Approach (2008)
- Cheveley Park Stakes - (1) - Park Appeal (1984)
- Coronation Stakes - (2) - Flame of Tara (1983), Lush Lashes (2008)
- Derby - (1) - New Approach (2008)
- Dewhurst Stakes - (5) - Teofilo (2006), New Approach (2007), Intense Focus (2008), Parish Hall (2011), Dawn Approach (2012)
- King George VI and Queen Elizabeth Stakes - (1) - St Jovite (1992)
- Nassau Stakes - (2) - Park Express (1986), Alexander Goldrun (2005)
- Oaks - (1) - Jet Ski Lady (1991)
- St. James's Palace Stakes - (2) - Dawn Approach (2013), Poetic Flare (2021)
- Vertem Futurity Trophy - (1) - Mac Swiney (2020)
- Yorkshire Oaks - (3) - Condessa (1981), Lush Lashes (2008), Pleascach (2015)

Hong Kong

- Hong Kong Cup - (1) - Alexander Goldrun (2004)

Italy

- Oaks d'Italia - (1) - Ivyanna (1992)
