= Kingsfort =

American-bred Thoroughbred racehorse

- Sire: War Chant
- Grandsire: Danzig
- Dam: Princess Kris
- Damsire: Kris
- Sex: Stallion
- Foaled: 20 March 2007
- Country: United States
- Colour: Bay
- Breeder: Airlie Stud
- Owner: Norman Ormiston; Godolphin
- Trainer: Kevin Prendergast; Saeed bin Suroor
- Record: 7: 3-0-1
- Earnings: £188,521

Major wins
- National Stakes (2009); Ben Marshall Stakes (2010)

Kingsfort (foaled 20 March 2007) is an American-bred Thoroughbred racehorse and sire who competed in Ireland, England, the United Arab Emirates and France. As a two-year-old in 2009, he was unbeaten in two races in Ireland including the Group 1 National Stakes. After a transfer to Godolphin and a lengthy absence, he returned for two races in England in 2010 and won the Listed Ben Marshall Stakes. In the following year, he was beaten in all three of his starts and was retired to stud in Italy at the end of the season.

== Background ==
Kingsfort is a dark bay horse with no white markings bred in Kentucky by the Irish-based Airlie Stud. As a yearling in October 2008, the colt was consigned to the Goff's Orby Million and Sportsman's Yearling Sale and was bought for €36,000 by the bloodstock agent Frank Barry on behalf of the veteran trainer Kevin Prendergast. Prendergast also bought the filly Termagant shortly afterwards at the same auction and later joked "It was a good job I wasn’t out for a cup of tea". Kingsfort was taken into training by Prendergast and entered the ownership of the Irish businessman Norman Ormiston.

His sire War Chant recorded his biggest victory in the 2000 edition of the Breeders' Cup Mile. As a breeding stallion, the best of his progeny have included Chamberlain Bridge, who won the Breeders' Cup Turf Sprint in 2010 and the Santa Anita Derby winner Midnight Interlude. Kingsfort's dam Princess Kris showed modest racing ability, winning one minor race from eight starts. She did better as a broodmare, also producing the Gulfstream Park Breeders' Cup Handicap winner Prince Arch. She was a granddaughter of Royal Saint, a full sister to Altesse Royale.

== Racing career ==
=== 2009: two-year-old season ===
Kingsfort made his racecourse debut in a maiden race over seven furlongs on soft ground at the Curragh on 26 June and started at odds of 100/30 in a twelve-runner field. He was settled behind the leaders before taking the lead two furlongs from the finish and won by two lengths from the Dermot Weld-trained Stunning View with the Aidan O'Brien-trained favourite Viscount Nelson four and a half lengths back in third. After a two-month break, Kingsfort returned for the Group 1 National Stakes over the same course and distance on 12 September. He started the 9/4 second favourite behind Alfred Nobel in a six-runner field which also included Beethoven, Air Chief Marshall (runner up to Alfred Nobel in the Phoenix Stakes) and the highly regarded maiden winner Chabal. Ridden as on his first appearance by Declan McDonogh, he raced in third place behind Air Chief Marshall and Beethoven before going to the front a furlong out and held off a late challenge from Chabal to win by a neck.

In October, Kingsfort was acquired privately by Sheikh Mohammed's Godolphin organisation and transferred to the training stable of Saeed bin Suroor.

=== 2010: three-year-old season ===
In early 2010, it was announced that Kingfort had suffered a "setback" and would miss both the 2000 Guineas and the Epsom Derby.

After an absence of over a year, the colt made his first appearance for his new connections in the Listed Guisborough Stakes over seven furlongs at Redcar Racecourse on 2 October 2010. He started the 11/4 joint-favourite but made little impression and finished fifth behind the five-year-old gelding Harrison George. In the Ben Marshall Stakes at Newmarket four weeks, later he was the least fancied of the three Godolphin runners, starting at 10/1; whereas, his stablemates Secrecy and Alexandros went off at 15/8 and 100/30, respectively. The best of the other five runners appeared to be Nationalism and The Cheka both of whom were preferred to Kingsfort in the betting. After racing in third place behind the 40/1 outsider Lefty, Kingsfort was sent to the front a furlong out and kept on well to win by one and a quarter lengths from The Cheka.

=== 2011: four-year-old season ===
In the early part of 2011, Kingsfort was sent to Godolphin's training base in the United Arab Emirates and contested two handicap races at Meydan Racecourse in Dubai, ridden on both occasions by Frankie Dettori. He finished third to Derbaas in the Falcon Lounge Trophy over 1600 metres in January and fifth to Raihana in the Dubai Excellence Trophy over 1800 metres in February. On his return to Europe, he had one further race. In the Prix du Muguet over 1600 metres at Longchamp Racecourse on 1 May, he led for most of the way before being overtaken in the last 200 metres and finishing sixth behind Rajsaman.

== Stud record ==
At the end of his racing career, Kingsfort was retired to become a breeding stallion at the Azienda Agricola Cansana in Italy.

== Pedigree ==
Pedigree of Kingsfort (USA), bay stallion, 2007
Sire War Chant (USA) 1997	Danzig (USA); 1977	Northern Dancer	Nearctic
Sire War Chant (USA) 1997	Danzig (USA); 1977	Northern Dancer	Natalma
Sire War Chant (USA) 1997	Danzig (USA); 1977	Pas de Nom	Admirals Voyage
Sire War Chant (USA) 1997	Danzig (USA); 1977	Pas de Nom	Petitioner
Sire War Chant (USA) 1997	Hollywood Wildcat (USA); 1990	Kris S	Roberto
Sire War Chant (USA) 1997	Hollywood Wildcat (USA); 1990	Kris S	Sharp Queen
Sire War Chant (USA) 1997	Hollywood Wildcat (USA); 1990	Miss Wildcatter	Mr Prospector
Sire War Chant (USA) 1997	Hollywood Wildcat (USA); 1990	Miss Wildcatter	Elizabeth K
Dam Princess Kris (GB) 1990	Kris (GB); 1976	Sharpen Up	Atan
Dam Princess Kris (GB) 1990	Kris (GB); 1976	Sharpen Up	Rocchetta
Dam Princess Kris (GB) 1990	Kris (GB); 1976	Doubly Sure	Reliance
Dam Princess Kris (GB) 1990	Kris (GB); 1976	Doubly Sure	Soft Angels
Dam Princess Kris (GB) 1990	As You Desire Me (IRE); 1977	Kalamoun	Zeddaan
Dam Princess Kris (GB) 1990	As You Desire Me (IRE); 1977	Kalamoun	Khairunissa
Dam Princess Kris (GB) 1990	As You Desire Me (IRE); 1977	Royal Saint	Saint Crespin
Dam Princess Kris (GB) 1990	As You Desire Me (IRE); 1977	Royal Saint	Bleu Azur (Family: 1-w)
