= Flutter Away =

Irish-bred Thoroughbred racehorse

- Sire: Lomond
- Grandsire: Northern Dancer
- Dam: Flying Bid
- Damsire: Auction Ring
- Sex: Mare
- Foaled: 23 February 1985
- Country: Ireland
- Colour: Bay
- Breeder: Baroda Stud
- Owner: Oliver Murphy
- Trainer: Dermot Weld
- Record: 7: 3-0-0

Major wins
- Railway Stakes (1987); Moyglare Stud Stakes (1987)

Awards
- Timeform rating 104 (1987)

Honours
- Top-rated two-year-old filly in Ireland (1987)

Flutter Away (foaled 23 February 1985) was an Irish Thoroughbred racehorse and broodmare. She showed her best form as a two-year-old in 1987 when she won three of her five races including the Railway Stakes and the Moyglare Stud Stakes and was rated the best filly of her generation in Ireland. She made no impact in two races as a three-year-old and was retired from racing at the end of the year. She was then exported to become a broodmare in Japan where she produced four winners.

== Background ==
Flutter Away was a bay mare bred in Ireland by the County Kildare-based Baroda Stud. In 1986 the filly was sent to the Goffs Irish National Yearlings Sales and was bought privately by Ovidstown Bloodstcok. She entered the ownership of the businessman Oliver Murphy and was sent into training with Dermot Weld. She was ridden in most of her races by Mick Kinane.

She was from the third crop of foals sired by Lomond, an American-bred half-brother of Seattle Slew who won the 2000 Guineas in 1983. His other offspring included Marling, Dark Lomond, Inchmurrin, Valanour and River North. Flutter Away's dam Flying Bid showed little racing ability but did manage to win one minor race at Listowel Racecourse as a four-year-old and was a sister to the Prix Robert Papin winner Maelstrom Lake. As a descendant of the Irish broodmare Bridle Way (foaled 1952), she was also a distant relative of the Belmont Stakes winner Caveat.

== Racing career ==
=== 1987: two-year-old season ===
Flutter Away began her racing career in a five furlong maiden race at Phoenix Park Racecourse in May and won by two and a half lengths from Saintly Lass. The form of the race was boosted at Royal Ascot in June when the runner-up finished second in the Queen Mary Stakes. In July Flutter Away was stepped up in class and distance for the Group 3 Railway Stakes over six furlongs at the Curragh. She won by a short head from Fairy Gold (a full-sister) to Sadler's Wells with the pair finishing several lengths clear of their rivals. The filly was then moved to Group 1 class for the Phoenix Stakes on 9 August. Starting at odds of 8/1, she came home seventh of the twelve runners, five lengths behind the winner Digamist and four lengths behind Fairy Gold, who finished third. Later that month she produced another disappointing effort, running fourth of five behind Lake Como in the Anglesey Stakes.

On 13 September Flutter Away was one of eleven fillies to contest the Group 1 Moyglare Stud Stakes over six furlongs at the Curragh and was made the 7/1 fourth choice in the betting. Fairy Gold started favourite ahead of the British challengers Thaidah and Timely, while the best-fancied of the others was Lively Pebbles, another British-trained filly. The field was described as "undistinguished" by Timeform. Equipped with blinkers for the first time Flutter Away finished strongly to catch Fairy Gold in the final strides and won by a short head despite hanging to the right in the closing stages. Timely was only a short head away in third, just ahead of Thaidah.

In the official International Classification for 1987 she was rated on 112, making her the top-rated juvenile filly in Ireland, albeit 13 pounds inferior to the French-trained Ravinella who topped the classification. The independent Timeform organisation gave her a rating of 104, seventeen pounds behind Ravinella, who was their best two-year-old filly.

=== 1988: three-year-old season ===
Flutter Away began her second season in the Harp Lager 1000 Guineas Trial at Phoenix Park on 2 April for which she started 4/5 favourite but finished fourth of the seven runners, beaten more than ten lengths by the winner Bell Tower. On 21 May the filly started a 25/1 outsider for the Irish 1000 Guineas at the Curragh in which she was ridden by Greville Starkey, with Kinane taking the ride on her better fancied stablemate Trusted Partner. In what proved to be her final track appearance, Flutter Away came home tenth of the sixteen runners, as Trusted Partner took the race.

== Breeding record ==
At the end of her racing career, Flutter Away was exported to become a broodmare in Japan. She produced five foals and four winners:

- Takano Prima, a bay filly, foaled in 1990, sired by Bamboo Atlas. Won three races.
- Belvedere, brown filly, 1992, by Tosho Boy. Won three races.
- Flutter Lady, bay filly, 1993, by Creator. Won one race.
- Hello Good-bye, bay colt, 1994, by Crystal Glitters. Failed to win in six races.
- Rusunai Angel, grey filly, 1999, by Black Tie Affair. Won one race.

Although her last foal was born in 1999 she was still being covered as late as 2004.

== Pedigree ==
Pedigree of Flutter Away (IRE), bay mare, 1985
Sire Lomond (USA) 1980	Northern Dancer (CAN); 1961	Nearctic	Nearco
Sire Lomond (USA) 1980	Northern Dancer (CAN); 1961	Nearctic	Lady Angela
Sire Lomond (USA) 1980	Northern Dancer (CAN); 1961	Natalma	Native Dancer
Sire Lomond (USA) 1980	Northern Dancer (CAN); 1961	Natalma	Almahmoud
Sire Lomond (USA) 1980	My Charmer (USA); 1969	Poker	Round Table
Sire Lomond (USA) 1980	My Charmer (USA); 1969	Poker	Glamour
Sire Lomond (USA) 1980	My Charmer (USA); 1969	Fair Charmer	Jet Action
Sire Lomond (USA) 1980	My Charmer (USA); 1969	Fair Charmer	Myrtle Charm
Dam Flying Bid (IRE) 1977	Auction Ring (USA); 1972	Bold Bidder	Bold Bidder
Dam Flying Bid (IRE) 1977	Auction Ring (USA); 1972	Bold Bidder	High Bill
Dam Flying Bid (IRE) 1977	Auction Ring (USA); 1972	Hooplah	Hillary
Dam Flying Bid (IRE) 1977	Auction Ring (USA); 1972	Hooplah	Beadah
Dam Flying Bid (IRE) 1977	Skyway (GB); 1968	Skymaster	Golden Cloud
Dam Flying Bid (IRE) 1977	Skyway (GB); 1968	Skymaster	Discipliner
Dam Flying Bid (IRE) 1977	Skyway (GB); 1968	Emerald Isle	Kelly
Dam Flying Bid (IRE) 1977	Skyway (GB); 1968	Emerald Isle	Bridle Way (family: 3-n)
