= Alfred Nobel (horse) =

Irish-bred Thoroughbred racehorse

- Sire: Danehill Dancer
- Grandsire: Danehill
- Dam: Glinting Desert
- Damsire: Desert Prince
- Sex: Stallion
- Foaled: 27 January 2007
- Country: Ireland
- Colour: Bay
- Breeder: Lodge Park Stud
- Owner: Derrick Smith, Susan Magnier & Michael Tabor
- Trainer: Aidan O'Brien
- Record: 10: 3-1-2
- Earnings: £244,633

Major wins
- Railway Stakes (2009); Phoenix Stakes (2009)

Alfred Nobel (foaled 27 January 2007) is an Irish Thoroughbred racehorse and sire. As a two-year-old in 2009 he was beaten in his first two races but after winning a maiden race at his third attempt he went on to record major victories in the Railway Stakes and the Phoenix Stakes. He was beaten in three subsequent races that year and failed to recover his form in two starts as a three-year-old. After his retirement from racing he stood a breeding stallion in Ireland and Australia.

== Background ==
Alfred Nobel is a bay horse with a narrow white blaze bred in Ireland by Lodge Park Stud. As a yearling in October 2008 he was consigned to the Tattersalls sale where he was bought for 220,000 guineas by John Magnier of the Coolmore Stud. The colt was sent into training with Aidan O'Brien at Ballydoyle. Like many Coolmore horses the details of the colt's ownership changed from race to race: he sometimes raced in the colours of Derrick Smith or Michael Tabor, while on others he was described as the property of a partnership between Tabor, Smith and Susan Magnier. He was ridden in all but one of his races by Johnny Murtagh.

He was sired by Danehill Dancer, who won the Phoenix Stakes, National Stakes and Greenham Stakes before becoming a very successful breeding stallion. His other progeny have included Choisir, Mastercraftsman, Legatissimo, Lillie Langtry and Dancing Rain. Alfred Nobel's dam Glinting Desert showed little racing ability, winning one minor race from eight starts. However, as a granddaughter of the outstanding racemare Park Express she was closely related to many major winners including New Approach and Was.

== Racing career ==
=== 2009: two-year-old season ===
Alfred Nobel began his racing career in a maiden race over five furlongs at Naas Racecourse on 18 April when he started at odds of 7/2 and finished second of the eight runners, beaten half a length by Pilgrim Dancer. On 4 May he started favourite or a similar event over six furlongs at the Curragh but finished third of the twelve runners after briefly being denied a clear run in the last quarter mile. Later that month he was stepped up to seven furlongs for a maiden at Leopardstown Racecourse and recorded his first success. Starting at odds of 4/5 he tracked the leaders before going to the front approaching the final furlong and won by one and a half lengths from Sparking Power. On 28 June the colt was moved up in class for the Group 2 Railway Stakes over six furlongs at the Curragh and started 6/4 favourite ahead of five opponents including the Rochestown Stakes winner Love Lockdown and the Fillies' Sprint Stakes runner-up Kitty Kiernan. After racing in fourth place Alfred Nobel took the lead a furlong and a half out and stayed on to win by one and a quarter lengths and a head from the outsiders Dragon Fighter and King Ledley. After the race Aidan O'Brien said "He progressed from his first run to his second, his second run to his third, and now he's come forward again. He was green when he hit the front, and leaned away from the ground, and you'd hope he'd get a mile in time".

The Group 1 Phoenix Stakes at the Curragh on 26 July saw Alfred Nobel narrowly preferred in the betting to the Tommy Stack-trained filly Walk On Bye who had won the Anglesey Stakes on her last start. Dragon Fighter and King Ledley were again in opposition with the best-fancied of the other four runners was Beethoven. After being restrained toward the rear by Murtagh he moved up into second behind his unfancied stablemate Air Chief Marshal inside the final furlong. He gained the advantage in the final strides and won by half a length with a gap of two and a half lengths back to Walk On Bye in third. O'Brien commented "The last day he won very snug but Johnny said he just got there too early on him, so today he was going to wait and wait. The worry was whether he could change gears on that heavy ground but obviously he's a very good horse". Bookmakers responded by offering odds of between 6/1 and 8/1 against the colt for the following year's 2000 Guineas.

With Murtagh required to ride Changingoftheguard in the St Leger on 12 September, Seamie Heffernan took the ride when Alfred Nobel started favourite for the National Stakes at the Curragh on the same day. After racing towards the rear of the field he made some progress in the last quarter mile but never looked likely to win and finished last of the six runners behind the Kevin Prendergast-trained Kingsfort. On 2 October he was sent to England for the Tattersalls Timeform Million, a valuable race restricted to juveniles sold at auction at Tattersalls, and finished fifth of the 22 runners. He appeared somewhat unlucky as he raced up the stands side (the left-hand side from the jockeys' viewpoint) whilst the first four finishers all raced up the far side. Alfred Nobel ended his season with a trip to California for the Breeders' Cup Juvenile on the synthetic Cushion Track at Santa Anita Park in which he finished tenth of the thirteen runners behind Vale of York.

=== 2010: three-year-old season ===
Alfred Nobel made his first appearance of 2010 in the Listed Loughbrown Stakes over seven furlongs at the Curragh on 11 April in which he started 3/1 second favourite but came home seventh of the eight runners. He produced a better effort in the Greenlands Stakes over six furlongs at the same track on 22 May as he finished third to the British gelding Markab.

== Stud record ==
After his retirement from racing Alfred Nobel stood as a breeding stallion for the Coolmore Stud in Ireland and was also shuttled to stand in Australia for the southern hemisphere breeding season. In March 2015 he was bought outright by Lynward Park Stud, who had previously owned a 50% share in the stallion and moved to Western Australia. The best of his offspring has probably been Snowy Chloe who won the WATC Sires Produce in 2015.

== Pedigree ==
Pedigree of Alfred Nobel (IRE), bay stallion, 2007
Sire Danehill Dancer (IRE) 1993	Danehill (USA); 1986	Danzig	Northern Dancer
Sire Danehill Dancer (IRE) 1993	Danehill (USA); 1986	Danzig	Pas de Nom
Sire Danehill Dancer (IRE) 1993	Danehill (USA); 1986	Razyana	His Majesty
Sire Danehill Dancer (IRE) 1993	Danehill (USA); 1986	Razyana	Spring Adieu
Sire Danehill Dancer (IRE) 1993	Mira Adonde (USA); 1986	Sharpen Up	Atan
Sire Danehill Dancer (IRE) 1993	Mira Adonde (USA); 1986	Sharpen Up	Rocchetta
Sire Danehill Dancer (IRE) 1993	Mira Adonde (USA); 1986	Lettre D'Amour	Caro
Sire Danehill Dancer (IRE) 1993	Mira Adonde (USA); 1986	Lettre D'Amour	Lianga
Dam Glinting Desert (IRE) 2002	Desert Prince (IRE); 1995	Green Desert	Danzig
Dam Glinting Desert (IRE) 2002	Desert Prince (IRE); 1995	Green Desert	Foreign Courier
Dam Glinting Desert (IRE) 2002	Desert Prince (IRE); 1995	Flying Fairy	Bustino
Dam Glinting Desert (IRE) 2002	Desert Prince (IRE); 1995	Flying Fairy	Fairy Footsteps
Dam Glinting Desert (IRE) 2002	Dazzling Park (IRE); 1996	Warning	Known Fact
Dam Glinting Desert (IRE) 2002	Dazzling Park (IRE); 1996	Warning	Slightly Dangerous
Dam Glinting Desert (IRE) 2002	Dazzling Park (IRE); 1996	Park Express	Ahonoora
Dam Glinting Desert (IRE) 2002	Dazzling Park (IRE); 1996	Park Express	Matcher (Family 19-b)
