= Pampapaul =

Irish-bred Thoroughbred racehorse

- Sire: Yellow God
- Grandsire: Red God
- Dam: Pampalina
- Damsire: Bairam
- Sex: Stallion
- Foaled: 24 March 1974
- Country: Ireland
- Colour: Chestnut
- Breeder: Hans Paul
- Owner: Hans Paul
- Trainer: Stuart Murless
- Record: 11: 3-4-0

Major wins
- National Stakes (1976); Irish 2,000 Guineas (1977)

Awards
- Timeform rating 119 (1976), 121 (1977)

Pampapaul (24 March 1974 – 1979) was an Irish Thoroughbred racehorse and sire. As a two-year-old he was one of the best colts of his generation in Ireland, winning the National Stakes and being placed in both the Railway Stakes and the Royal Lodge Stakes. In the following spring he recorded his biggest success with an upset victory over The Minstrel and Nebbiolo in the Irish 2,000 Guineas but failed to reproduce the form and was well-beaten in his last three races. He made a promising start as a breeding stallion but died in 1979 after only two seasons at stud.

== Background ==
Pampapaul was a "rangy, strong" chestnut horse with a white star and muzzle and three white socks bred in Ireland by his owner Hans Paul. The colt was sent into training in County Kildare with Stuart Murless, the younger brother of the English trainer Noel Murless. Although he was overshadowed by the reputation of his brother, Stuart Murless had a long and successful training career, recording major successes with Nocturnal Spree, Royal Highway (1958 Irish St. Leger) and Sicilian Prince (1962 Prix Royal Oak).

His sire Yellow God who won the Gimcrack Stakes and the Prix du Palais-Royal as well as finishing second to Nijinsky in the 2000 Guineas. He stood as a breeding stallion in Europe before being exported to Japan in the summer of 1973. The best of his progeny included Nebbiolo and the Japanese Derby winner Katsu Top Ace. Pampapaul's dam Pampalina was a top-class staying racemare who won the Irish Oaks in 1967. She was a half-sister to Short Commons, the female-line ancestor of Victoire Pisa and Arctic Owl.

== Racing career ==
=== 1976: two-year-old season ===
Pampapaul finished second in his first two races before contesting a maiden over six furlongs at the Curragh in June and recorded his first success despite hanging to the left in the closing stages. He was then moved up in class for the Railway Stakes over the same course and distance and was equipped with blinkers for the first time. After a slow start he made rapid progress approaching the final furlong but was hampered in the closing stages and finished third behind Brahms and Roman Charger. In the National Stakes over seven furlongs at the Curragh in September the colt was matched against seven opponents including Roman Charger, Lordedaw (runner-up in the Coventry Stakes) and the favoured Captain James. Pampapaul showed his difficult temperament both before and during the race. After being reluctant to enter the starting stalls he took the lead a quarter of a mile from the finish but then began to hang badly to the left. He nevertheless won decisively, coming home two and a half lengths clear of Captain James. Later that month Pampapaul was sent to England and started favourite for the Royal Lodge Stakes over one mile at Ascot Racecourse. Despite his jockey's attempts to restrain him he disputed the lead from the start and set a strong pace which left most of his opponents struggling. He weakened in the final furlong and was beaten a length into second place by Gairloch.

=== 1977: three-year-old season ===
On his three-year-old debut Pampapaul looked less than fully fit when finishing fifth behind Lordedaw in the Tetrarch Stakes over seven furlongs at the Curragh in April. In the Irish 2000 Guineas on 14 May the colt was partnered by the Italian jockey Gianfranco Dettori and started at odds of 16/1 in a twenty-one runner field. The Minstrel started favourite ahead of Nebbiolo whilst the other runners included Artaius, Lordedaw, Ballad Rock, Roman Charger as well as the British challengers Bona-Mia and Pollerton. Dettori tracked the leaders before switching to the outside to deliver his challenge in the last quarter mile. Pampapaul took the lead inside the final furlong and held off the challenge of The Minstrel to win by a short head with Nebbiolo a length away in third place. Before he took the lead, a battle raged between Nebbiolo (who had won the English 2,000 Guineas) and The Minstrel (who was to win the English Derby), memorably described on the radio by Michael O’Hehir, who cried out, as those two horses ran inside the final furlong, "And here comes Pampapaul!", almost as if it was expected, as indeed it was by all the regulars of The Pickerel Inn, Cambridge who had bet on it that morning at odds of 22/1 on the well-celebrated advice of one of their number, Charles (later Sir Charles) Colthurst, Baronet.

Pampapaul was moved up in distance to contest the 198th running of The Derby over one and a half miles at Epsom Downs Racecourse in June but after tracking the leaders he was unable to make any progress in the straight and finished seventh behind The Minstrel. Two weeks later he was dropped back in distance for the St James's Palace Stakes over one mile at Royal Ascot and finished fourth of the seven runners behind Don, Marinsky and Tachypous. On his only subsequent appearance he was sent to France for the Prix Jacques Le Marois over 1600 metres at Deauville Racecourse in August and finished last of the seven runners behind Flying Water.

== Assessment ==
There was no International Classification of European two-year-olds in 1976: the official handicappers of Britain, Ireland and France compiled separate rankings for horses which competed in those countries. In the Irish Free Handicap or 1976, Pampapaul was assigned a weight of 122 pounds, making him the fifth-best juvenile of the season behind Cloonlara, Godswalk, Padroug and The Minstrel. The independent Timeform organisation gave him a rating of 119, twelve pounds below their best two-year-old colt Blushing Groom. In 1977 Timeform awarded him a rating of 121, making him 16 pounds inferior to their Horse of the Year Alleged.

== Stud record ==
At the end of his racing career Pampapaul was retired to become a breeding stallion at the Irish National Stud. He sired only two crops of foals before his death in 1979 at the age of five. The best of his offspring included Pampabird (Prix du Chemin de Fer du Nord, Prix Messidor, Prix du Rond Point, sire of Subotica) and Sandhurst Prince (Waterford Crystal Mile).

== Pedigree ==
Pedigree of Pampapaul (IRE), chestnut stallion, 1974
Sire Yellow God (GB) 1967	Red God (USA); 1954	Nasrullah	Nearco
Sire Yellow God (GB) 1967	Red God (USA); 1954	Nasrullah	Mumtaz Begum
Sire Yellow God (GB) 1967	Red God (USA); 1954	Spring Run	Menow
Sire Yellow God (GB) 1967	Red God (USA); 1954	Spring Run	Boola Brook
Sire Yellow God (GB) 1967	Sally Deans (GB); 1947	Fun Fair	Fair Trial
Sire Yellow God (GB) 1967	Sally Deans (GB); 1947	Fun Fair	Humoresque
Sire Yellow God (GB) 1967	Sally Deans (GB); 1947	Cora Deans	Coronach
Sire Yellow God (GB) 1967	Sally Deans (GB); 1947	Cora Deans	Jennie Deans
Dam Pampalina (IRE) 1964	Bairam (FR); 1955	Nearco	Pharos
Dam Pampalina (IRE) 1964	Bairam (FR); 1955	Nearco	Nogara
Dam Pampalina (IRE) 1964	Bairam (FR); 1955	Bibi Toori	Owen Tudor
Dam Pampalina (IRE) 1964	Bairam (FR); 1955	Bibi Toori	Bibibeg
Dam Pampalina (IRE) 1964	Padus (GB); 1955	Anwar	Umidwar
Dam Pampalina (IRE) 1964	Padus (GB); 1955	Anwar	Stafaralla
Dam Pampalina (IRE) 1964	Padus (GB); 1955	Cherry Way	Airway
Dam Pampalina (IRE) 1964	Padus (GB); 1955	Cherry Way	Cherry Pie (Family:8-d)

- Pampapaul was inbred 3 × 4 to Nearco, meaning that this stallion appears in both the third and fourth generations of his pedigree.
