= Mantovani (disambiguation) =

Mantovani (1905–1980) was an Anglo-Italian conductor, composer and entertainer.

Mantovani may also refer to:

- Mantovani Orchestra, a popular British dance band
- Mantovani (surname)
- Mantovani (horse), a racehorse
- Mantovani (TV series)
