= Arctique Royale =

Irish-bred Thoroughbred racehorse

Arctique Royal
- Sire: Royal and Regal
- Grandsire: Vaguely Noble
- Dam: Arctic Melody
- Damsire: Arctic Slave
- Sex: Mare
- Foaled: 22 April 1978
- Country: Ireland
- Colour: Bay
- Breeder: Paddy Prendergast
- Owner: Paddy Prendergast; Jean-Pierre Binet
- Trainer: Kevin Prendergast
- Record: 8: 3-1-0

Major wins
- Moyglare Stud Stakes (1980); Irish 1000 Guineas (1982)

Awards
- Timeform rating 102p (1980), 114 (1981)

Arctique Royale (22 April 1978 – 2000) was an Irish Thoroughbred racehorse and broodmare. As a two-year-old she made only two appearances, winning a maiden race at the Curragh on her debut and then taking the Moyglare Stud Stakes at the same track. She was beaten on her first run of 1982 but then recorded her biggest win in the Irish 1000 Guineas. She was beaten in her last four races and was retired from racing at the end of the year. She had considerable success as a broodmare.

== Background ==
Arctique Royale was a "lightly-made" bay mare with no white markings bred in Ireland by her owner Paddy Prendergast. She was trained throughout her racing career by her breeder's son Kevin Prendergast.

She was sired by Royal and Regal, an American stallion who recorded his biggest win in the 1973 Florida Derby. Her dam Arctic Melody was a top-class racemare who defeated Aunt Edith in the 1965 edition of the Musidora Stakes before becoming a successful broodmare. Her other foals included Racquette (third in the Irish Oaks) and Le Melody, the dam of Ardross and the female-line ancestor of Electrocutionist and Scorpion.

== Racing career ==
=== 1980: two-year-old season ===
On her racecourse debut Arctique Royale started favourite for a maiden race over five furlongs at the Curragh Racecourse in May and won by two and a half lengths from Hear A Rhapsody after drawing clear of her ten opponents in the closing stages. Paddy Prendergast died in June and for the rest of the year the filly was owned by the executors of his estate. After a three-month break the filly returned in the Moyglare Stud Stakes (the a Group Two race over six furlongs) at the Curragh in August. Starting the 5/4 favourite she accelerated in the final furlong and won by a length from Lady Tiffany with the early leader Lady Nightingale three quarters of a length back in third place. Kevin Prendergast did not run the filly again that year, stating that she needed more time to mature.

=== 1982: three-year-old season ===
Before the start of the 1982 season Arctique Royale was bought privately by the French owner Jean-Pierre Binet.

The filly began her second campaign in the Athasi Stakes over seven furlongs at the Curragh in April and sustained her first defeat as she finished fourth behind Martinova, Overplay and Castlemaine. On 23 May, ridden by Gabriel Curran, she was one of fifteen three-year-old fillies to contest the Irish 1000 Guineas over one mile on heavy ground at the Curragh. Martinova started favourite ahead of Blue Wind with Arctique Royale the 7/1 joint third choice in the betting alongside the British-trained Star Pastures. In the last quarter mile the race devolved into a prolonged struggle between Arctique Royale and Blue Wind, with the Prendergast filly prevailing by a short head after a "fierce duel". Her win gave "Squibs" Curran his second and final Irish Classic after Nebbiolo in the 1977 Irish 2000 Guineas.

Arctique Royale ran four more times before the end of the season without recovering her Classic winning form. At the Curragh in late June she was stepped up in distance for the Pretty Polly Stakes over ten furlongs but was beaten three lengths into second place by Happy Bride, a filly who had finished fifth in the Guineas. It was later reported that she had come into season shortly before the race. In the Irish Oaks on 18 July she started the 7/2 second favourite but never looked likely to win and finished sixth of the ten runners behind Blue Wind. After a two-month break she returned to the track and was matched against male opposition in the Joe McGrath Memorial Stakes at Leopardstown Racecourse. She started a 16/1 outsider and finished sixth behind her owner's more fancied runner Kings Lake. On her final run she was sent to France and finished unplaced in the Prix de l'Opéra at Longchamp Racecourse in October.

== Assessment ==
In 1980 the independent Timeform organisation gave Arctique Royal a rating of 102 p (the p indicating that she was expected to improve), making her 22 pounds inferior to Timeform's top two-year-old filly Marwell. In the Irish Free Handicap she was given a weight of 113 pounds, three pounds behind her stablemate Lady Blackfoot, who was the top-rated Irish-trained juvenile filly of the year.

In the 1981 Irish Free Handicap Arctiue Royale was rated the fourth-best three-year-old filly in Ireland behind Blue Wind, Condessa and Happy Bride. Timeform gave her a rating of 113, 20 pounds behind their best three-year-old filly Marwell.

== Breeding record ==
After retiring from racing, Arctique Royale became a broodmare. She produced fifteen foals and eight winners between 1983 and 1998:

- Lake Success, a colt, foaled in 1983, sired by Kings Lake. Winner in France.
- Gold and Glory, bay colt, 1984, by Golden Fleece
- Truly Special, bay filly, 1985, by Caerleon. Won races in France and Italy, female-line ancestor of Moonstone (Irish Oaks), Cerulean Sky (Prix Saint-Alary), Naval Crown and US Army Ranger.
- All of Me, bay colt, 1986, by Be My Guest. Won two races.
- Unheard Melody, filly, 1987, by Lomond
- Armorique, bay filly, 1988, by Top Ville. Failed to win in five races.
- Modhish, bay colt, 1989, by Sadler's Wells. Won three races including the Grand Prix de Deauville and Prix Jean de Chaudenay.
- Zeami, bay colt, 1990, by Soviet Star
- Arctique Lady, filly, 1991, by Last Tycoon
- Russian Snows, bay filly, 1992, by Sadler's Wells. Won four races including the Prix de Royallieu.
- Truly Generous, chestnut filly, 1993, by Generous. Won two races including the Listed Prix Petite Étoile.
- Antarctique, bay colt, 1994, by Sadler's Wells. Won three races. Successful sire of jumpers.
- Banquise, bay filly, 1995, by Last Tycoon. Won one race.
- Enteshal, bay colt, (later gelded), 1997, by Sadler's Wells
- Marghub, bay colt, (later gelded), 1998, by Darshaan. Failed to win in fifteen races.

== Pedigree ==
Pedigree of Arctique Royale (IRE), bay mare, 1978
Sire Royal and Regal (USA) 1970	Vaguely Noble (IRE); 1965	Vienna	Aureole
Sire Royal and Regal (USA) 1970	Vaguely Noble (IRE); 1965	Vienna	Turkish Blood
Sire Royal and Regal (USA) 1970	Vaguely Noble (IRE); 1965	Noble Lassie	Nearco
Sire Royal and Regal (USA) 1970	Vaguely Noble (IRE); 1965	Noble Lassie	Belle Sauvage
Sire Royal and Regal (USA) 1970	Native Street (USA); 1963	Native Dancer	Polynesian
Sire Royal and Regal (USA) 1970	Native Street (USA); 1963	Native Dancer	Geisha
Sire Royal and Regal (USA) 1970	Native Street (USA); 1963	Beaver Street	My Babu
Sire Royal and Regal (USA) 1970	Native Street (USA); 1963	Beaver Street	Wood Fire
Dam Arctic Melody (GB) 1962	Arctic Slave (IRE); 1950	Arctic Star	Nearco
Dam Arctic Melody (GB) 1962	Arctic Slave (IRE); 1950	Arctic Star	Serena
Dam Arctic Melody (GB) 1962	Arctic Slave (IRE); 1950	Roman Galley	Man o' War
Dam Arctic Melody (GB) 1962	Arctic Slave (IRE); 1950	Roman Galley	Messaline
Dam Arctic Melody (GB) 1962	Bell Bird (GB); 1954	Mustang	Mieuxce
Dam Arctic Melody (GB) 1962	Bell Bird (GB); 1954	Mustang	Buzz Fuzz
Dam Arctic Melody (GB) 1962	Bell Bird (GB); 1954	Belpatrick	Khosro
Dam Arctic Melody (GB) 1962	Bell Bird (GB); 1954	Belpatrick	British Queen (Family:23)
