= Sweet Emma =

Irish-bred Thoroughbred racehorse

- Sire: Welsh Saint
- Grandsire: St Paddy
- Dam: Gang Plank
- Damsire: Tower Walk
- Sex: Mare
- Foaled: 19 March 1980
- Country: Ireland
- Colour: Bay
- Breeder: Hesmonds Stud
- Owner: Jackie Ward Ramos
- Trainer: Michael Connolly; Kevin Prendergast; Peter Walwyn
- Record: 8: 3-0-1

Major wins
- Phoenix Stakes (1982)

Awards
- Timeform rating 108 (1982), 95 (1983)

Honours
- Top-rated Irish 2-yo filly (1982)

Sweet Emma (19 March 1980 – after 1998) was an Irish Thoroughbred racehorse and broodmare. As a two-year-old in 1982 she won two minor races in spring and then recorded her most important success with a victory in the Group 1 Phoenix Stakes. She went on to finish fourth in the Moyglare Stud Stakes and ended the year as the best Irish-trained juvenile filly of her generation. After being transferred to race in England she failed to win at three but did finish third in the Leisure Stakes and fourth in the Coronation Stakes. After her retirement from racing she had some success as a broodmare in Europe and Japan.

== Background ==
Sweet Emma was a "lengthy, attractive" bay mare with no white markings bred in Ireland by the Hesmonds Stud. As a yearling she was sold for 8,200 guineas and was sent into training with Michael Connolly.

She was sired by Welsh Saint, a sprinter who recorded his biggest win in the 1970 edition of the Cork and Orrery Stakes. Her dam Gang Plank showed little aptitude for racing, failing to win in four starts. She was descended from the British broodmare Excelsa (foaled 1949) who was the dam of Exar (Goodwood Cup) and the grand-dam of Wollow.

== Racing career ==
=== 1982: two-year-old season ===
Sweet Emma began her racing career in March 1982 when she won a maiden race over five furlongs at Naas Racecourse. She followed up shortly afterwards in a minor race over the same distance on soft ground at the Curragh. After her two wins in spring the filly was sold privately to Jackie Ward Ramos and was transferred to the stable of Kevin Prendergast. Four months after her last race Sweet Emma was stepped up to Group 1 class for the Phoenix Stakes on firm ground at Leopardstown Racecourse on 7 August, in which she was ridden by Gabriel Curran. The John Oxx-trained colt Najran started favourite ahead of Treasure Trove (from the Vincent O'Brien stable) and the unbeaten filly Flame of Tara. Despite looking impressive before the race Sweet Emma went off at odds of 12/1 after drifting out from 4/1 on the day of the race after receiving an unfavourable draw. Curran tracked the leaders before going to the front approaching the final furlong and Sweet Emma accelerated away to win by three lengths from Najran.

On 11 September Sweet Emma was moved up to six furlongs for the Moyglare Stud Stakes at the Curragh. She was among the leaders for most of the way but faded in the final furlong and finished fourth behind the British-trained Habibti. At the end of the month she was sent to England to contest the Group 1 Cheveley Park Stakes at Newmarket Racecourse. She started the 8/1 third favourite but ran poorly and finished eighth of the nine runners behind Ma Biche.

In December Sweet Emma was put up for auction at Newmarket and was sold for 220,000 guineas. She then moved to the stable of Peter Walwyn at Seven Barrows near Lambourn in Berkshire.

In the Irish Free Handicap for 1982, Sweet Emma was rated the best two-year-old filly trained in Ireland, although she was seven pounds behind Habibti. The independent Timeform organisation gave her a rating of 108, making her fifteen pounds inferior to their top two-year-ol filly Ma Biche. In their annual Racehorses of 1982 Timeform described her as "a very useful sprinter" but having obvious stamina limitations.

=== 1983: three-year-old season ===
Sweet Emma made her first appearance for her new trainer in the Leisure Stakes over six furlongs at Lingfield Park in early June and produced a creditable effort to finish a close third behind Solimile and Kirchner. She was then stepped up in class and distance for the Coronation Stakes at Royal Ascot later that month and came home fourth of the six runners behind Flame of Tara. On her only subsequent appearance she contested a handicap race over seven furlongs at Newmarket in July and finished fourth after sweating up badly before the start.

== Breeding record ==
Sweet Emma was retired from racing to become a broodmare. She was based in Ireland before being exported to Japan in 1988. She produced eleven foals and six winners between 1985 and 1998.

- Love Legend, a chestnut colt (later gelded), foaled in 1985, sired by Glint of Gold. Won thirteen races including the Portland Handicap.
- Galapagos, bay filly, 1986, by Pitskelly. Failed to win in 25 races.
- Sweet Form, brown filly, 1987, by Formidable. Failed to win in two races.
- Miss Taleca, chestnut filly, 1988, by Pharly. Failed to win in two races.
- Kyoei Keyman, bay colt, 1989, by Petoski. Won six races and finished third in the Sprinters Stakes.
- Keishu Grace, bay filly, 1990, by Nippo Teio. Won one race.
- Kyoei Uranus, bay colt, 1991, by Gorytus. Failed to win in two races.
- Inter Through, bay colt, 1992, by Diamond Shoal. Won two races.
- Kyoei Sweet, bay filly, 1995, by Dance of Life. Failed to win in eight races.
- Kyoei Pure, bay filly, 1996, by Jade Robbery. Won one race.
- Inter Advance, bay colt, 1998, by Carnegie. Won three races.

== Pedigree ==
Pedigree of Sweet Emma (IRE), bay mare, 1980
Sire Welsh Saint (IRE) 1966	St Paddy (GB); 1957	Aureole	Hyperion
Sire Welsh Saint (IRE) 1966	St Paddy (GB); 1957	Aureole	Angelola
Sire Welsh Saint (IRE) 1966	St Paddy (GB); 1957	Edie Kelly	Bois Roussel
Sire Welsh Saint (IRE) 1966	St Paddy (GB); 1957	Edie Kelly	Caerlissa
Sire Welsh Saint (IRE) 1966	Welsh Way (GB); 1954	Abernant	Owen Tudor
Sire Welsh Saint (IRE) 1966	Welsh Way (GB); 1954	Abernant	Rustom Mahal
Sire Welsh Saint (IRE) 1966	Welsh Way (GB); 1954	Winning Ways	Fairway
Sire Welsh Saint (IRE) 1966	Welsh Way (GB); 1954	Winning Ways	Honey Buzzard
Dam Gang Plank (IRE) 1972	Tower Walk (GB); 1966	High Treason	Court Martial
Dam Gang Plank (IRE) 1972	Tower Walk (GB); 1966	High Treason	Eastern Grandeur
Dam Gang Plank (IRE) 1972	Tower Walk (GB); 1966	Lorrikeet	Pearl Diver
Dam Gang Plank (IRE) 1972	Tower Walk (GB); 1966	Lorrikeet	Parakeet
Dam Gang Plank (IRE) 1972	Hunea (IRE); 1967	Hornbeam	Hyperion
Dam Gang Plank (IRE) 1972	Hunea (IRE); 1967	Hornbeam	Thicket
Dam Gang Plank (IRE) 1972	Hunea (IRE); 1967	Appeal	Court Martial
Dam Gang Plank (IRE) 1972	Hunea (IRE); 1967	Appeal	Excelsa (Family: 22-d)

- Through her dam Gang Plank, Sweet Emma was inbred 4 × 4 to Court Martial, meaning that this stallion appears twice in the fourth generation in the fourth generation of her pedigree.
