= Lavery (horse) =

Irish-bred Thoroughbred racehorse

- Sire: Royal Academy
- Grandsire: Nijinsky
- Dam: Lady Donna
- Damsire: Dominion
- Sex: Stallion
- Foaled: 14 March 1996
- Country: Ireland
- Colour: Bay
- Breeder: Barronstown Stud, John Horgan and Ron Con Ltd
- Owner: Michael Tabor & Susan Magnier
- Trainer: Aidan O'Brien
- Record: 22: 5-2-2
- Earnings: £98,478 (in Europe)

Major wins
- Phoenix Stakes (1998); Shergar Cup Sprint (1999)

Lavery (foaled 14 March 1996) was an Irish-bred Thoroughbred racehorse and sire. As a two-year-old in 1998 he was beaten on his debut but then recorded his biggest success with an emphatic victory in the Group 1 Phoenix Stakes. In the following spring he won the Shergar Cup Sprint but was beaten in his next two races before being exported to South Africa. He won three times in South Africa before being retired to stud but had little success as a breeding stallion.

== Background ==
Lavery was a bay horse bred in Ireland by the Barronstown Stud, John Horgan and Ron Con Ltd. As a yearling he was consigned to the Tattersalls Houghton Sale where he was bought for 140,000 guineas by the bloodstock agent Dermot "Demi" O'Byrne on behalf of John Magnier's Coolmore organisation. He was sent into training with Aidan O'Brien at Ballydoyle. Like many Coolmore horses the details of the colt's ownership changed from race to race: he was sometimes listed as being owned by Michael Tabor whilst on others occasions he ran for the partnership of Tabor and Susan Magnier.

He was from the fifth crop of foals sired by Royal Academy, who won the July Cup and the Breeders' Cup Mile in 1990. At stud, the best of his other winners included Ali-Royal, Bullish Luck, Sleepytime, Val Royal and Oscar Schindler. Lavery's dam Lady Donna showed modest racing ability, winning one minor race as a two-year-old in 1984, but was a half-sister to the 2000 Guineas winner Tirol.

== Racing career ==
=== 1998: two-year-old season ===
Lavery made his debut in a maiden race over six furlongs on 12 July at the Curragh in which he was ridden by Christy Roche. Starting at odds of 5/1 he finished sixth of the eleven runners behind the John Oxx-trained filly Takariya. Thirteen days later he was withdrawn at the start of another maiden over five furlongs at the same track after panicking and attempting to break out of the starting stalls. Despite never having won a race the colt was then stepped up to Group 1 class for the Phoenix Stakes at Leopardstown Racecourse on 9 August and started at odds of 14/1. The Prix Robert Papin winner Black Amber started joint-favourite alongside Pharmacist (Rochestown Stakes), just ahead of the Marble Hill Stakes winner Access All Areas. Ridden by Walter Swinburn tracked the leaders before taking the lead just inside the final furlong and won in "impressive" style by one and a half lengths from Access All Areas. After the race Swinburn said "Lavery is a fine, big colt who travelled all the way for me, I gave him one smack and he accelerated well" whilst Aidan O'Brien commented "Lavery has plenty of potential and is engaged in all the major juvenile events around Europe. He got a fright in the stalls at the Curragh, but he had always shown loads of class at home. He has a high cruising speed so I told Walter to take it handy early on. The sky is the limit for this horse".

In the following month Lavery was sent to England and started 9/4 favourite for the Champagne Stakes at Doncaster Racecourse. Ridden by Mick Kinane he never looked likely to win and came home fifth of the nine runners behind Auction House.

=== 1999: three-year-old season ===
On 8 May Lavery made his first appearance as a three-year-old at Goodwood Racecourse in the inaugural Shergar Cup, a series of races which pitted European-owned horses against a team representing Middle-Eastern owners. Competing for the European side in the Sprint race, the colt was ridden by Kinane and started at odds of 5/1 in a ten-runner field. After tracking the leaders he went to the front inside the final furlong and drew away to win by two and a half lengths from the Flying Childers Stakes winner Sheer Viking with Pipalong in fourth. Eight days later the colt was sent to France for the Poule d'Essai des Pouliches over 1600 metres at Longchamp Racecourse and finished tenth after fading badly in the closing stages.

Lavery then returned to sprinting and was scheduled to compete in the King's Stand Stakes at Royal Ascot but was withdrawn at the start. He returned to action in the July Cup at Newmarket Racecourse on 8 July. Ridden by Willie Supple he started a 20/1 outsider and finished unplaced in a race won by his stablemate Stravinsky.

== Later career ==
At the end of his 1999 campaign in Europe, Lavery was sent to race in South Africa. He ran sixteen times in South Africa, winning three races and being placed on four occasions. He finished third in the Grade 1 Cape Flying Championship at Kenilworth in January 2001.

== Stud record ==
After his retirement from racing in 2001, Lavery stood as a breeding stallion in South Africa. He was based at the Summerhill Stud and later moved to the Heversham Park Stud in Gauteng but made little impact as a sire of winners.

== Pedigree ==
Pedigree of Lavery (IRE), bay stallion, 1996
Sire Royal Academy (USA) 1987	Nijinsky (CAN); 1967	Northern Dancer	Nearctic
Sire Royal Academy (USA) 1987	Nijinsky (CAN); 1967	Northern Dancer	Natalma
Sire Royal Academy (USA) 1987	Nijinsky (CAN); 1967	Flaming Page	Bull Page
Sire Royal Academy (USA) 1987	Nijinsky (CAN); 1967	Flaming Page	Flaring Top
Sire Royal Academy (USA) 1987	Crimson Saint (USA); 1969	Crimson Satan	Spy Song
Sire Royal Academy (USA) 1987	Crimson Saint (USA); 1969	Crimson Satan	Papila
Sire Royal Academy (USA) 1987	Crimson Saint (USA); 1969	Bolero Rose	Bolero
Sire Royal Academy (USA) 1987	Crimson Saint (USA); 1969	Bolero Rose	First Rose
Dam Lady Donna (GB) 1982	Dominion (GB); 1972	Derring-Do	Darius
Dam Lady Donna (GB) 1982	Dominion (GB); 1972	Derring-Do	Sipsey Bridge
Dam Lady Donna (GB) 1982	Dominion (GB); 1972	Picture Palace	Princely Gift
Dam Lady Donna (GB) 1982	Dominion (GB); 1972	Picture Palace	Palais Glide
Dam Lady Donna (GB) 1982	Alpine Niece (GB); 1972	Great Nephew	Honeyway
Dam Lady Donna (GB) 1982	Alpine Niece (GB); 1972	Great Nephew	Sybil's Niece
Dam Lady Donna (GB) 1982	Alpine Niece (GB); 1972	Fragrant Morn	Mourne
Dam Lady Donna (GB) 1982	Alpine Niece (GB); 1972	Fragrant Morn	Alpine Scent (Family: 10-c)
