= Digamist =

American-bred Thoroughbred racehorse

- Sire: Blushing Groom
- Grandsire: Red God
- Dam: Disconiz
- Damsire: Northern Dancer
- Sex: Stallion
- Foaled: 26 March 1985
- Country: United States
- Colour: Chestnut
- Owner: Khalid Abdulla
- Trainer: Jeremy Tree
- Record: 7: 3-0-1

Major wins
- Phoenix Stakes (1987)

Awards
- Timeform rating 110 (1987)

Digamist (26 March 1985 – February 2011) was an American-bred, British-trained Thoroughbred racehorse and sire. He raced only as a two-year-old in 1987 when he won two minor races and finished fourth in the Coventry Stakes before winning the Phoenix Stakes which was at that time the most valuable race for juveniles in Europe. He was well-beaten in two subsequent races and never appeared on the racecourse again. He sired many minor winners but made relatively little impact as a breeding stallion. He died in 2011 at the age of twenty-six.

== Background ==
Digamist was a "rangy" chestnut horse with a broad white blaze and two white socks, bred in Kentucky by the bloodstock company Seahorse '84. As a yearling he was consigned to the Keeneland Select sale and was bought for $625,000 by representatives of Khalid Abdulla. The colt was sent to race in Europe and entered training with Jeremy Tree at Beckhampton in Wiltshire. He was ridden in most of his races by Pat Eddery.

He was sired by Blushing Groom, who won the Grand Critérium in 1976 and the Poule d'Essai des Poulains in 1977 before becoming a very successful breeding stallion. His progeny included Arazi, Blushing John, Nashwan, Rahy, Rainbow Quest and Snow Bride. Digamist's dam Disconiz was a successful racemare who won seven races including the 1980 edition of the Princess Stakes. Disconiz's female-line ancestors had been bred in South America for several generations, being descendants of the British mare Flitaway (foaled in 1905) who was exported to Argentina in 1910. Flitaway was a half-sister to the influential broodmare Sterling Balm.

== Racing career ==
=== 1987: two-year-old season ===
Digamist finished third to Ship of Fools in a minor race over five furlongs at Ascot Racecourse on his track debut and then won a maiden race over the same distance at Kempton Park. The colt was then stepped up in class and distance for the Group 3 Coventry Stakes over six furlongs at Royal Ascot on 16 June and finished fourth of the thirteen runners behind Always Fair, Oakworth and Ship of Fools. He was equipped with a visor when he contested the Crowthers Stakes at York and won very easily from three opponents.

On 9 August Digamist was sent to Ireland for the Group 1 Phoenix Stakes at Phoenix Park Racecourse and started the 7/1 fourth choice in the betting behind Oakworth, Bellefella (runner-up to Warning in the Richmond Stakes) and Sadler's Wells's sister Fairy Gold. The other eight runners included Ship of Fools, Flutter Away (Railway Stakes) and Saintly Lass (second in the Queen Mary Stakes). The race carried first prize money of £149,954, making it by far the most valuable race for juveniles in Europe. After tracking the leader Ship of Fools he moved up to dispute the lead a furlong out and saw off a sustained challenge from Oakworth to win by a neck. Digamist failed to reproduce his best form in two subsequent races. In September he was sent to France and started favourite for the Prix de la Salamandre over 1400 metres at Longchamp but came home fifth of the six runners behind Common Grounds. In the Middle Park Stakes at Newmarket he finished last of the five runners in a race won by Gallic League.

In the official International Classification for 1987, Digamist was given a rating of 114, making him eleven pound inferior to the top-rated pair Ravinella and Warning. The independent Timeform organisation rated him on 100, seventeen ponds behind Warning, who was their top-rated juvenile.

== Stud record ==
Despite reports that Digamist would resume his racing career in North America, he did not race again and was retired to become a breeding stallion. He was based at the Irish National Stud until 1993, and was then returned to his native Kentucky, where he stood at the Crown Colony Farm and later at the Margaux Stud. In 1997 he moved to Xanthus Farm near Gettysburg, Pennsylvania, where he remained for the rest of his life. He was euthanised in February 2011 owing to "complications from old age".

Digamist sired champions in Panama and Austria, while the best of his North American runners included the Canadian stakes winner Second Chance.

== Pedigree ==
Pedigree of Digamist (USA), chestnut stallion 1985
Sire Blushing Groom (FR) 1974	Red God (USA); 1954	Nasrullah	Nearco
Sire Blushing Groom (FR) 1974	Red God (USA); 1954	Nasrullah	Mumtaz Begum
Sire Blushing Groom (FR) 1974	Red God (USA); 1954	Spring Run	Menow
Sire Blushing Groom (FR) 1974	Red God (USA); 1954	Spring Run	Boola Brook
Sire Blushing Groom (FR) 1974	Runaway Bride (GB); 1962	Wild Risk	Rialto
Sire Blushing Groom (FR) 1974	Runaway Bride (GB); 1962	Wild Risk	Wild Violet
Sire Blushing Groom (FR) 1974	Runaway Bride (GB); 1962	Aimee	Tudor Minstrel
Sire Blushing Groom (FR) 1974	Runaway Bride (GB); 1962	Aimee	Emali
Dam Disconiz (USA) 1977	Northern Dancer (CAN); 1961	Nearctic	Nearco
Dam Disconiz (USA) 1977	Northern Dancer (CAN); 1961	Nearctic	Lady Angela
Dam Disconiz (USA) 1977	Northern Dancer (CAN); 1961	Natalma	Native Dancer
Dam Disconiz (USA) 1977	Northern Dancer (CAN); 1961	Natalma	Almahmoud
Dam Disconiz (USA) 1977	Codorniz (URU); 1962	Cockrullah	Nasrullah
Dam Disconiz (USA) 1977	Codorniz (URU); 1962	Cockrullah	Summerleaze
Dam Disconiz (USA) 1977	Codorniz (URU); 1962	Boule de Neige	Latero
Dam Disconiz (USA) 1977	Codorniz (URU); 1962	Boule de Neige	Blancanieves (Family: 14-f)

- Digamist was inbred 3 × 4 to Nasrullah, meaning that this stallion appears in both the third and fourth generations of his pedigree.
