= Landseer (horse) =

British-bred Thoroughbred racehorse

- Sire: Danehill
- Grandsire: Danzig
- Dam: Sabria
- Damsire: Miswaki
- Sex: Stallion
- Foaled: 1999
- Country: Great Britain
- Colour: Bay
- Breeder: Rockwell Bloodstock
- Owner: Michael Tabor and Sue Magnier
- Trainer: Aidan O'Brien
- Record: 13: 4-4-1
- Earnings: $1,154,458

Major wins
- Coventry Stakes (2001); Poule d'Essai des Poulains (2002); Shadwell Turf Mile Stakes (2002)

Landseer (February 28, 1999 – October 26, 2002) was a Thoroughbred racehorse. A son of Champion sire Danehill, he was out of the mare, Sabria, whose sire Miswaki was the sire of the great filly Urban Sea. Owned and raced by Michael Tabor and Sue Magnier, the colt was conditioned by the Irish trainer Aidan O'Brien.

Sent to the track at age two, in June 2001 Jamie Spencer rode Landseer to victory in the then Group III Coventry Stakes. The colt's other notable results that year came in October when he ran second to stablemate Rock of Gibraltar in England's Dewhurst Stakes at Newmarket Racecourse. He finished second again under jockey Michael Kinane in the Critérium International at Saint-Cloud Racecourse in France.

As a three-year-old, Landseer finished third in April's Prix de Fontainebleau at Longchamp Racecourse in Paris then won the May running of the Group One Poule d'Essai des Poulains. In June, he had another second-place finish to Rock of Gibraltar, this time in the St. James's Palace Stakes at Ascot Racecourse in England. Landseer's next success came in October when he made his first start in the United States. Ridden by Edgar Prado, he defeated what Thoroughbred Times described as a "quality-laden field" in capturing the Grade I Shadwell Turf Mile Stakes at Keeneland Race Course in Kentucky.

== 2002 Breeders' Cup Mile ==
Because of his strong winning performance in the Shadwell Turf Mile Stakes, Landseer was then sent to Arlington Park in Chicago where he was entered as a supplemental nominee in the Breeders' Cup Mile. Once again Landseer would compete against nemesis Rock of Gibraltar, the overwhelming betting favorite. Racing in the middle of a fourteen-horse field for the first half mile, jockey Edgar Prado made a move with Landseer but at the top of the stretch the colt went down. His injuries were such that he had to be euthanized. Rock of Gibraltar, who started poorly and was far back most of the way, had to swing around the fallen Landseer but made a powerful stretch run to finish second behind longshot winner, Domedriver.
