= Gabriel Curran =

Irish jockey

Gabriel Curran (died 2008) was an Irish flat racing jockey. Curran rode the winners of two Irish Classic Races during his career as well as the English 2,000 Guineas on Nebbiolo in 1977. He rode for trainer Kevin Prendergast and after retiring as a jockey worked as an assistant trainer to Charlie Swan and ran a stud farm. Curran was born in Kells, County Meath and died suddenly in 2008.

== Major wins ==
(Republic of Ireland) Ireland

- Irish 1,000 Guineas - (1) - Arctique Royale (1981)
- Irish 2,000 Guineas - (1) - Northern Treasure (1976)
- Phoenix Stakes - (1) - Sweet Emma (1982)

United Kingdom

- 2,000 Guineas - (1) - Nebbiolo (1977)
