= Blushing Groom =

French Thoroughbred racehorse

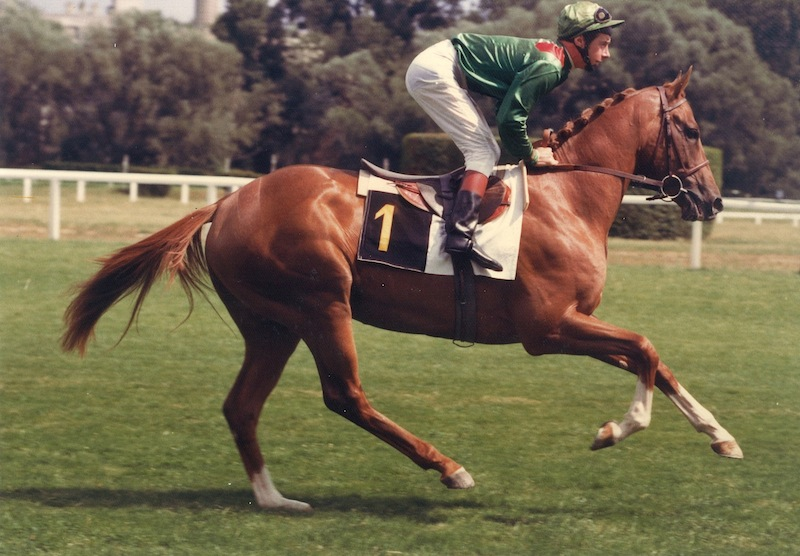
- Sire: Red God
- Grandsire: Nasrullah
- Dam: Runaway Bride
- Damsire: Wild Risk
- Sex: Stallion
- Foaled: 8 April 1974
- Died: 6 May 1992 (aged 18)
- Country: France
- Colour: Chestnut
- Breeder: John McNamee Sullivan
- Owner: HH Aga Khan IV
- Trainer: François Mathet
- Record: 10: 7-1-2
- Earnings: $407,153

Major wins
- Prix Robert Papin (1976); Prix Morny (1976); Prix de la Salamandre (1976); Grand Critérium (1976); Prix de Fontainebleau (1977); Poule d'Essai des Poulains (1977)

Awards
- French Champion Two-Year-Old Colt (1976); European Champion 3-Year-Old Miler (1977); Leading broodmare sire in Great Britain & Ireland (1988, 1995); Leading sire in Great Britain & Ireland (1989); Timeform rating: 136
- Last updated on 12 July 2022

Blushing Groom (8 April 1974 – 6 May 1992) was a French champion Thoroughbred racehorse and sire.

== Background ==
He was bred by American businessman John McNamee Sullivan and was raced by HH Aga Khan IV. A descendant of Nearco, Blushing Groom was sired by Red God and out of the mare Runaway Bride. He was trained by François Mathet in France.

== Racing record ==
Blushing Groom raced six times in 1976 at age two. He finished third on his debut, then won the next five races, including four Group One events, capturing the Prix Robert Papin, Prix Morny, Prix de la Salamandre and Grand Critérium. His performances earned him French Champion Two-Year-Old honors.

As a three-year-old, Blushing Groom extended his win streak to seven, winning the 1977 Prix de Fontainebleau and the GI Poule d'Essai des Poulains. Sent to England to compete in The Derby, he faced a 1½ mile challenge, a distance fifty per cent longer than he had ever run before. He finished third to winner The Minstrel, a son of Northern Dancer. In his final race, Blushing Groom finished second in France's Prix Jacques Le Marois.

== Stud record ==
Although Blushing Groom met with considerable success in racing, he became even greater as a sire. He was sent to stand at stud at Gainesway Farm in Lexington, Kentucky, where he sired winners at major tracks in Europe, North America, Australia, Japan and Hong Kong. Like his sire Red God, Blushing Groom had been a champion miler but many of his offspring are renowned for their stamina and were able to win consistently at longer distances.

Blushing Groom has sired 92 stakes winners. His notable progeny include:

- Arazi – won three GI races in France in 1991 plus the Breeders' Cup Juvenile, voted 1991 European Horse of the Year and United States Champion 2-Year-Old Colt
- Baillamont – won Prix Jean Prat, Prix Ganay, Prix d'Ispahan
- Blush With Pride – won the Kentucky Oaks
- Blushing John – won Poule d'Essai des Poulains, Hollywood Gold Cup, 1989 U.S. Eclipse Award for Outstanding Older Male Horse
- Candy Stripes – sire of 2005 American Champion Male Turf Horse, Leroidesanimaux and 2006 American Horse of the Year, Invasor
- Crystal Glitters – won Prix d'Ispahan (1983 & 1984)
- Digamist – won Phoenix Stakes
- Gold Splash – won Coronation Stakes, Prix Marcel Boussac
- Groom Dancer – won Prix Lupin, sired Groom Tesse, Egerton
- Nashwan – in 1989 won 2,000 Guineas, Eclipse Stakes, Epsom Derby, King George VI and Queen Elizabeth Stakes, sire of Bago, Swain
- Nassipour – won Canadian International Stakes, sired Let's Elope, Tie the Knot
- Rahy – sire of U.S. Racing Hall of Fame inductee Serena's Song, 2001 European Horse of the Year, Fantastic Light, Mariah's Storm, Noverre, champion 3 yr old in England, and Dreaming of Anna, 2006 U.S. 2-Year-Old Champion Filly & Breeders' Cup Juvenile Fillies winner
- Rainbow Quest – won Prix de l'Arc de Triomphe, Coronation Cup, the Leading broodmare sire in Great Britain & Ireland in 2003 & 2004
- Runaway Groom – Canadian Horse Racing Hall of Fame
- Sky Beauty – 1993 United States' Filly Triple Crown winner voted 1994 Champion Older Female
- Snow Bride – won Epsom Oaks
- Almuinjjid

Blushing Groom is the grandsire of Tawrrific, Let's Elope, Cherokee Run, Silic, Subordination, Congaree, Leroidesanimaux, Tie the Knot, Swain, Matikanefukukitaru, Dreaming of Anna, Bago, and 2006 World Champion, Invasor. He is also the damsire of Awesome Again, Kahyasi, Lammtarra, Mayano Top Gun, 2000 Japanese Horse of the Year T. M. Opera O and Goldikova.

Blushing Groom died in 1992 and is buried at Gainesway Farm in Lexington, Kentucky.

== Pedigree ==
Pedigree of Blushing Groom (FR), chestnut stallion, 1974
Sire Red God (USA) Ch. 1954	Nasrullah (IRE); 1940	Nearco (ITY)	Pharos
Sire Red God (USA) Ch. 1954	Nasrullah (IRE); 1940	Nearco (ITY)	Nogara
Sire Red God (USA) Ch. 1954	Nasrullah (IRE); 1940	Mumtaz Begum (FR)	Blenheim
Sire Red God (USA) Ch. 1954	Nasrullah (IRE); 1940	Mumtaz Begum (FR)	Mumtaz Mahal
Sire Red God (USA) Ch. 1954	Spring Run; 1948	Menow	Pharamond
Sire Red God (USA) Ch. 1954	Spring Run; 1948	Menow	Alcibiades
Sire Red God (USA) Ch. 1954	Spring Run; 1948	Boola Brook	Bull Dog
Sire Red God (USA) Ch. 1954	Spring Run; 1948	Boola Brook	Brookdale
Dam Runaway Bride (GB) 1962	Wild Risk (FR); 1940	Rialto	Rabelais
Dam Runaway Bride (GB) 1962	Wild Risk (FR); 1940	Rialto	La Grelee
Dam Runaway Bride (GB) 1962	Wild Risk (FR); 1940	Wild Violet	Blandford
Dam Runaway Bride (GB) 1962	Wild Risk (FR); 1940	Wild Violet	Wood Violet
Dam Runaway Bride (GB) 1962	Aimee; 1957	Tudor Minstrel (IRE)	Owen Tudor
Dam Runaway Bride (GB) 1962	Aimee; 1957	Tudor Minstrel (IRE)	Sansonnet
Dam Runaway Bride (GB) 1962	Aimee; 1957	Emali	Umidwar
Dam Runaway Bride (GB) 1962	Aimee; 1957	Emali	Eclair (Family: 22-d)
