= Nocturnal Spree =

Irish-bred Thoroughbred racehorse

- Sire: Supreme Sovereign
- Grandsire: Sovereign Path
- Dam: Night Attire
- Damsire: Shantung
- Sex: Mare
- Foaled: 8 March 1972
- Country: Ireland
- Colour: Grey
- Breeder: J. Dillon
- Owner: Anne-Hart O'Kelly
- Trainer: Stuart Murless
- Record: 4: 2-0-1

Major wins
- 1000 Guineas (1975)

Nocturnal Spree (1972–after 1991) was an Irish Thoroughbred racehorse. In a brief racing career lasting from the autumn of 1974 until May 1975, the filly ran four times and won two races. She finished third in her only race as a two-year-old before her season was ended by injury. In the spring of 1975 she won one minor race before recording an upset win in the Classic 1000 Guineas at Newmarket Racecourse. After one subsequent race she suffered a recurrence of her injury problems and was retired from racing. She later had modest success as a broodmare.

== Background ==
Nocturnal Spree was a strongly-built grey filly bred by J Dillon in County Limerick. Her dam, Night Attire, failed to win a race but proved to be a successful broodmare. After Nocturnal Spree she produced Tootens, who won the Prix Saint-Alary and Moonsilk, a mare who produced the St Leger Stakes winner Moonax. As a descendant of the broodmare Rosetta, she was also related to Altesse Royale, Bustino and Erhaab. Nocturnal Spree's sire Supreme Sovereign won the Free Handicap in 1967 but was not a great success as a breeding stallion. The best of his other progeny was Nocturnal Spree's contemporary Mark Anthony, a colt whose wins included the Greenham Stakes.

As a yearling, Nocturnal Spree was sent to the Ballsbridge sales in Dublin where she was bought for 6,200 guineas on behalf of Anne O'Kelly. The filly was sent into training in County Kildare with Stuart Murless, the younger brother of the English trainer Noel Murless. Although he was overshadowed by the reputation of his brother, Stuart Murless had a long and successful training career, recording major successes with Pampapaul, Royal Highway (1958 Irish St Leger) and Sicilian Prince (1962 Prix Royal Oak).

== Racing career ==
Nocturnal Spree began her racing career in a seven furlong maiden race at the Curragh in 1974. She showed some promise by finishing third. Shortly afterwards she sustained a serious injury to her pastern which prevented her from racing again that season.

In the spring of 1975, Nocturnal Spree returned to the Curragh to win the one mile April Maiden Stakes. She was then moved abruptly up in class for the Group One 1000 Guineas over the Rowley Mile course at Newmarket. Racing outside Ireland for the only time, she started at odds of 14/1 in a field of sixteen fillies, with Rose Bowl being made the 7/4 favourite. The start of the race was delayed for half an hour after a protest by striking stable staff. Ridden by Johnny Roe, Nocturnal Spree caught the French-trained filly Girl Friend in the last strides to win by a short head, with the Queen's filly Joking Apart in third and Rose Bowl an apparently unlucky fourth. Her victory was a first classic success for her owner, trainer and jockey, In the Irish 1000 Guineas at the Curragh three weeks later, Nocturnal Spree failed to reproduce her Newmarket form, finishing fourth to Miralla, ten lengths behind the winner. In summer Nocturnal Spree again injured her pastern. On this occasion the damage could not be fully repaired and she never raced again.

== Retirement ==
In December 1975, Nocturnal Spree was put up for auction at Newmarket. She was sold for 96,000 guineas to the bloodstock agent George Blackwell and was exported to North America. Nocturnal Spree's stud record was unexceptional, but she produced two stakes-winning fillies in Concordene (sired by Northern Dancer) and Norfolk Lavender (by Ascot Knight). Another daughter, Night Out, produced the Chester Cup winner Grey Salute. She produced her last foal, Norfolk Lavender, in 1991.

== Assessment and honours ==
In their book, A Century of Champions, based on the Timeform rating system, John Randall and Tony Morris rated Nocturnal Spree an "inferior" winner of the 1000 Guineas.

== Pedigree ==
Pedigree of Nocturnal Spree (IRE), grey mare, 1972
Sire Supreme Sovereign (GB) 1964	Sovereign Path; 1956	Grey Sovereign	Nasrullah
Sire Supreme Sovereign (GB) 1964	Sovereign Path; 1956	Grey Sovereign	Kong
Sire Supreme Sovereign (GB) 1964	Sovereign Path; 1956	Mountain Path	Bobsleigh
Sire Supreme Sovereign (GB) 1964	Sovereign Path; 1956	Mountain Path	Path of Peace
Sire Supreme Sovereign (GB) 1964	Valtellina; 1953	Vatellor	Vatout
Sire Supreme Sovereign (GB) 1964	Valtellina; 1953	Vatellor	Lady Elinor
Sire Supreme Sovereign (GB) 1964	Valtellina; 1953	Asti Spumante	Dante
Sire Supreme Sovereign (GB) 1964	Valtellina; 1953	Asti Spumante	Blanco
Dam Night Attire (GB) 1966	Shantung; 1956	Sicambre	Prince Bio
Dam Night Attire (GB) 1966	Shantung; 1956	Sicambre	Sif
Dam Night Attire (GB) 1966	Shantung; 1956	Barley Corn	Hyperion
Dam Night Attire (GB) 1966	Shantung; 1956	Barley Corn	Schiaparelli
Dam Night Attire (GB) 1966	Twilight Hour; 1950	Nearco	Pharos
Dam Night Attire (GB) 1966	Twilight Hour; 1950	Nearco	Nogara
Dam Night Attire (GB) 1966	Twilight Hour; 1950	Moonstone	Mahmoud
Dam Night Attire (GB) 1966	Twilight Hour; 1950	Moonstone	Rosetta (Family:1-w)
