= Robin Hood Stakes =

Flat horse race in Britain

Ben Marshall Stakes
2021
Zakouski	Stormy Antarctic	Jadoomi

Previous years
2020
Zakouski	Modern Millie	Epic Hero
2019
Roseman	Century Dream	Accidental Agent
2018
Mitchum Swagger	Muntadab	Robin Of Navan
2017
Bravo Zolo	Lord Glitters	Via Via
2016
Estidhkaar	Kool Kompany	Latharnach
2015
Big Baz	Mitchum Swagger	So Beloved
2014
French Navy	Fire Ship	Bronze Angel
2013
Penitent	French Navy	Tullius
2012
French Navy	Red Jazz	Fire Ship
2011
Secrecy	Samurai Sword	Maali

2010-2001
2010
Kingsfort	The Cheka	Balducci
2009
Prince Of Dance	Shaweel	Bushman
2008
Virtual	General Eliott	Alexandros
2007
Jalmira	Tell	Caldra
2006
Blue Ksar	Army of Angels	Bahia Breeze
2005
St Andrews	Violet Park	Borthwick Girl
2004
Sleeping Indian	Babodana	Take A Bow
2003
Babodana	Checkit	Grand Passion
2002
Smirk	Samhari	Beauchamp Pilot
2001
Riberac	Smirk	Imperial Dancer

2000-1991
2000
Albarahin	Rosse	Warningford
1999
Bomb Alaska	Albarahin	Alpenglow
1998
Generous Libra	Generous Rosi	Ramooz
1997
Samara	Balalaika	Desert Beauty
1996
Ali-Royal	Nijo	Fatefully
1995
Celestial Key	First Island	Bin Rosie
1994
Nijo	Lap of Luxury	Our Rita
1993
Mellottie	Fraam	Garden Of Heaven
1992
Inner City	Badawi	Swing Low
1991
Hyabella	Cardinal Point	St Ninian

1990-1988
1990
Two Left Feet	Swordsmith	Rushmore
1989
Light Of Morn	Just Three	Silk Petal
1988
Reprimand	Royal Touch	Chadenshe

The Robin Hood Stakes is a Listed flat horse race in Great Britain open to horses aged three years or older. It is run at Nottingham over a distance of 1 mile and 75 yards (1,678 metres), and is scheduled to take place each year in late October or early November. Prior to 2022 it was run on the Rowley Mile course at Newmarket over 1 mile. The first two scheduled runnings at Nottingham in 2022 and 2023 were abandoned due to a waterlogged course.

The race was originally named in honour of the equine artist Ben Marshall (1768-1835) and run as the Ben Marshall Stakes. In 2024 it was renamed in honour of the legendary outlaw Robin Hood.

== Winners ==
Year	Winner	Age	Jockey	Trainer	Time
1986	Cresta Auction	3	Gary Carter	Gavin Pritchard-Gordon	1:44.84
1987	Shady Heights	3	Willie Carson	Robert Armstrong	1:42.24
1988	Reprimand	3	Willie Ryan	Henry Cecil	1:42.13
1989	Light Of Morn	3	Bruce Raymond	Ben Hanbury	1:38.92
1990	Two Left Feet	3	George Duffield	Sir Mark Prescott	1:37.33
1991	Hyabella	3	John Reid	Michael Stoute	1:39.39
1992	Inner City	3	Frankie Dettori	Luca Cumani	1:38.93
1993	Mellottie	8	John Lowe	Mary Reveley	1:40.10
1994	Nijo	3	Jason Weaver	David Loder	1:43.36
1995	Celestial Key	5	Philip Robinson	Mark Johnston	1:36.91
1996	Ali-Royal	3	Pat Eddery	Henry Cecil	1:38.00
1997	Samara	4	Kieren Fallon	John Dunlop	1:37.59
1998	Generous Libra	4	Kevin Darley	John Dunlop	1:44.73
1999	Bomb Alaska	4	John Egan	Toby Balding	1:44.35
2000	Albarahin	5	Richard Hills	Marcus Tregoning	1:45.72
2001	Riberac	5	Kevin Darley	Mark Johnston	1:40.39
2002	Smirk	4	Kevin Darley	David Elsworth	1:41.69
2003	Babodana	3	Philip Robinson	Mark Tompkins	1:38.97
2004	Sleeping Indian (Note: Babodana finished first in 2004 but was placed second after a stewards' enquiry)	3	Jimmy Fortune	John Gosden	1:41.32
2005	St Andrews	5	Philip Robinson	Michael Jarvis	1:43.41
2006	Blue Ksar	3	Ted Durcan	Saeed bin Suroor	0:00.00
2007	Jalmira	6	Billy Lee	Charlie Swan	1:37.52
2008	Virtual	3	Jimmy Fortune	John Gosden	1:40.20
2009	Prince Of Dance	3	Richard Kingscote	Tom Dascombe	1:39.11
2010	Kingsfort	3	Daragh O'Donohoe	Saeed bin Suroor	1:40.27
2011	Secrecy	5	Kieren Fallon	Saeed bin Suroor	1:36.70
2012	French Navy	4	Mickael Barzalona	Mahmood Al Zarooni	1:40.37
2013	Penitent	7	Danny Tudhope	David O'Meara	1:41.65
2014	French Navy	6	Adam Kirby	Charlie Appleby	1:37.44
2015	Big Baz	5	Graham Lee	William Muir	1:39.97
2016	Estidhkaar	4	Dane O'Neill	Richard Hannon Jr.	1:36.30
2017	Brave Zolo	5	Adam Kirby	Charlie Appleby	1:39.47
2018	Mitchum Swagger	6	Harry Bentley	Ralph Beckett	1:40.42
2019	Roseman	3	Andrea Atzeni	Roger Varian	1:42.46
2020	Zakouski	4	William Buick	Charlie Appleby	1:46.66
2021	Zakouski	5	William Buick	Charlie Appleby	1:38.70
2022	no race (Note: The 2022 and 2023 runnings were abandoned due to waterlogging)
2023	no race
2024	Sparks Fly	4	Laura Pearson	David Loughnane	1:47.79
2025	Ice Max	4	Shane Gray	Karl Burke	1:52.01
2026	Oolong Poobong	4	Callum Rodriguez	Edward Bethell	1:51.06

== See also ==
- Horse racing in Great Britain
- List of British flat horse races
