= Railway Stakes (Ireland) =

- Class: Group 2
- Location: Curragh Racecourse; County Kildare, Ireland
- Inaugurated: 1851
- Race type: Flat / Thoroughbred
- Sponsor: Gain Feeds
- Website: Curragh

Race information
- Distance: 6f (1,207 metres)
- Surface: Turf
- Track: Straight
- Qualification: Two-year-olds
- Weight: 9 st 3 lb Allowances; 3 lb for fillies
- Purse: €112,800 (2022); 1st: €70,800

Railway Stakes
2026
Celeron	Tribeca	Confucius

Previous years
2025
True Love	Puerto Rico	Power Blue
2024
Henri Matisse	The Strikin Viking	Arizona Blaze
2023
Bucanero Fuerte	Unquestionable	His Majesty
2022
Shartash	Blackbeard	Apache Outlaw
2021
Go Bears Go	Castle Star	Masseto

2020-2011
2020
Laws Of Indices	Lucky Vega	Arctician
2019
Siskin	Monarch Of Egypt	Fort Myers
2018
Van Beethoven	Marie's Diamond	Certain Lad
2017
Beckford	Verbal Dexterity	Murillo
2016
Medicine Jack	Peace Envoy	Dream Of Dreams
2015
Painted Cliffs	Rockaway Valley	Log Out Island
2014
Kool Kompany	Ahlan Emarati	War Envoy
2013
Sudirman	Big Time	Coach House
2012
Probably	Cristoforo Colombo	Tiger Stripes
2011
Lilbourne Lad	Tough As Nails	French Emperor

2010-2001
2010
Formosina	Samuel Morse	Clondinnery
2009
Alfred Nobel	In Some Respect	King Ledley
2008
Mastercraftsman	Alhaban	Intense Focus
2007
Lizard Island	South Dakota	Irish Jig
2006
Holy Roman Emperor	Drayton	Excellent Art
2005
George Washington	Amigoni	Namaya
2004
Democratic Deficit	Russian Blue	L'Altro Mondo
2003
Antonius Pius	Spanish Ace	Classic Navigator
2002
Hold That Tiger	Pakhoes	Luminata
2001
Rock Of Gibraltar	Hawk Wing	Daneleta

2000-1991
2000
Honours List	Sure Mark	Sequoyah
1999
Bernstein	Desert Sky	Appalachia
1998
Camargo	Namid	April Starlight
1997
King Of Kings	Danyross	Dixie Dynamo
1996
Daylight In Dubai	Check The Band	Quws
1995
Flame Of Athens	Sweet Robin	Ribot's Secret
1994
Eva Luna	Helmsman	Jahid
1993
Polish Laughter	Kly Green	Bartok
1992
Ivory Frontier	Shahik	Tropical
1991
El Prado	Safety Tactic	Maledetto

1990-1988
1990
Time Gentlemen	Nordic Soprano	Green Lightning
1989
Armanasco	Neat Dish	Sadlers Congress
1988
Honoria	Ghilan	God's Country

The Railway Stakes is a Group 2 flat horse race in Ireland open to two-year-old thoroughbreds. It is run at the Curragh over a distance of 6 furlongs (1,207 metres), and it is scheduled to take place each year in late June or early July.

== History ==
The event was established in 1851, and it was originally contested over 6 furlongs. It was extended by 63 yards in 1897.

The race became known as the Railway Plate in 1946. It reverted to the title Railway Stakes in 1956. It was given Group 3 status in the early 1970s.

The Railway Stakes was shortened to 6 furlongs in 1984. It was promoted to Group 2 level in 2003. It is currently held on the same day as the Irish Derby.

== Records ==
Leading jockey since 1950 (7 wins):

- Christy Roche – Misty Bend (1973), Tender Camilla (1974), Noble Shamus (1979), Anfield (1981), Armanasco (1989), Ivory Frontier (1992), King of Kings (1997)

Leading trainer since 1950 (15 wins):

- Aidan O'Brien - King of Kings (1997), Bernstein (1999), Honours List (2000), Rock of Gibraltar (2001), Hold That Tiger (2002), Antonius Pius (2003), George Washington (2005), Holy Roman Emperor (2006), Lizard Island (2007), Mastercraftsman (2008), Alfred Nobel (2009), Painted Cliffs (2015), Van Beethoven (2018), Henri Matisse (2024), True Love (2025)

== Winners since 1980 ==
Year	Winner	Jockey	Trainer	Time
1980	Lawmaker	Tommy Murphy	Vincent O'Brien
1981	Anfield	Christy Roche	David O'Brien
1982	Ancestral	Pat Eddery	Vincent O'Brien
1983	El Gran Senor	Pat Eddery	Vincent O'Brien	1:18.10
1984	Moscow Ballet	Pat Eddery	Vincent O'Brien
1985	Bermuda Classic	Brent Thomson	Paddy Mullins
1986	Polonia	Declan Gillespie	Jim Bolger
1987	Flutter Away	Michael Kinane	Dermot Weld	1:18.30
1988	Honoria	Kevin Manning	Jim Bolger	1:13.10
1989	Armanasco	Christy Roche	Jim Bolger	1:13.90
1990	Time Gentlemen	Willie Carson	John Dunlop	1:12.20
1991	El Prado	Lester Piggott	Vincent O'Brien	1:14.40
1992	Ivory Frontier	Christy Roche	Jim Bolger	1:13.70
1993	Polish Laughter	Walter Swinburn	Ben Hanbury	1:15.80
1994	Eva Luna (IRE)	Kevin Manning	Jim Bolger	1:14.20
1995	Flame of Athens	John Reid	Michael Grassick	1:12.80
1996	Daylight in Dubai	John Reid	Peter Chapple-Hyam	1:12.00
1997	King of Kings	Christy Roche	Aidan O'Brien	1:14.00
1998	Camargo	Pat Smullen	Dermot Weld	1:20.00
1999	Bernstein	Michael Kinane	Aidan O'Brien	1:13.00
2000	Honours List	Damien Oliver	Aidan O'Brien	1:14.50
2001	Rock of Gibraltar	Michael Kinane	Aidan O'Brien	1:14.40
2002	Hold That Tiger	Michael Kinane	Aidan O'Brien	1:17.00
2003	Antonius Pius	Michael Kinane	Aidan O'Brien	1:13.50
2004	Democratic Deficit	Kevin Manning	Jim Bolger	1:11.60
2005	George Washington	Kieren Fallon	Aidan O'Brien	1:13.10
2006	Holy Roman Emperor	Kieren Fallon	Aidan O'Brien	1:12.50
2007	Lizard Island	Seamie Heffernan	Aidan O'Brien	1:18.71
2008	Mastercraftsman	Johnny Murtagh	Aidan O'Brien	1:13.32
2009	Alfred Nobel	Johnny Murtagh	Aidan O'Brien	1:15.05
2010	Formosina	Ryan Moore	Jeremy Noseda	1:10.77
2011	Lilbourne Lad	Richard Hughes	Richard Hannon Sr.	1:13.56
2012	Probably	Billy Lee	David Wachman	1:17.24
2013	Sudirman	Wayne Lordan	David Wachman	1:11.73
2014	Kool Kompany	Fran Berry	Richard Hannon Jr.	1:12.60
2015	Painted Cliffs	Ryan Moore	Aidan O'Brien	1:13.29
2016	Medicine Jack	Colin Keane	Ger Lyons	1:13.20
2017	Beckford	Declan McDonogh	Gordon Elliott	1:11.71
2018	Van Beethoven	Ryan Moore	Aidan O'Brien	1:12.45
2019	Siskin	Colin Keane	Ger Lyons	1:13.02
2020	Laws of Indices	Chris Hayes	Ken Condon	1:14.49
2021	Go Bears Go	Rossa Ryan	David Loughnane	1:12.80
2022	Shartash	Ben Coen	Johnny Murtagh	1:14.44
2023	Bucanero Fuerte	Rossa Ryan	Adrian Murray	1:09.97
2024	Henri Matisse	Wayne Lordan	Aidan O'Brien	1:11.72
2025	True Love	Ryan Moore	Aidan O'Brien	1:13.39
2026	Celeron	Oisin Murphy	Michael O'Callaghan	1:11.58

== Earlier winners ==
- 1851: Indian Warrior
- 1852: no race
- 1853: Ariadne
- 1854: no race
- 1855: Fireblast
- 1856: Blight
- 1857: Darling
- 1858: Drogheda
- 1859: Glory
- 1860: The Lawyer
- 1861: Socrates
- 1862: The Plover
- 1863: Union Jack
- 1864: Zisca
- 1865: Monitor
- 1866: Master Willie
- 1867: Uncas
- 1868: Melody
- 1869: Sarsfield
- 1870: Richard the First
- 1871: Maid of Perth
- 1872: Queen of the Bees
- 1873: Lady Patricia
- 1874: Wild Duck
- 1875: Maelstrom
- 1876: Mayfield
- 1877: Athy
- 1878: Shinglass
- 1879: Sibyl
- 1880: Barcaldine
- 1881: Melliflor
- 1882: Peace
- 1883: Grecian Bend
- 1884: Kilcreene
- 1885: Ashplant
- 1886: Kildare
- 1887: May Moon
- 1888: St Kieran
- 1889: Meliboeus
- 1890: Eyrefield
- 1891: Christabel
- 1892: Baccarat
- 1893: Gazetteer
- 1894: Angelus
- 1895: Winkfield's Pride
- 1896: General Peace
- 1897: Sabine Queen
- 1898: Oppressor
- 1899: Rapine
- 1900: Gogo
- 1901: St Brendan
- 1902: Fariman
- 1903: Jean's Folly
- 1904: Sir Daniel
- 1905: Juliet
- 1906: Electric Rose
- 1907: Twenty-Third
- 1908: Bachelor's Double
- 1909: Trepida
- 1910: Cigar
- 1911: Simon Lass
- 1912: Flax Meadow
- 1913: King's Common
- 1914: no race
- 1915: Shining More
- 1916: Durazzo
- 1917: Lady Earn
- 1918: Confey
- 1919: Blue Dun
- 1920: Shanganagh
- 1921: Rachel
- 1922: Darragh
- 1923: Vesington Star
- 1924: Capture Him
- 1925: Silver Lark
- 1926: Lavengro
- 1927: Cardinal's Ring
- 1928: Soloptic
- 1929: Confetti
- 1930: Sea Serpent
- 1931: Rathlin Isle
- 1932: Song of the Hills
- 1933: Kyloe
- 1934: Poor Jack
- 1935: Hocus Pocus
- 1936: Burdock
- 1937: Rosewell
- 1938: Bessbrook
- 1939: Monster Light
- 1940: Milady Rose
- 1941: Windsor Slipper
- 1942: Fabulous
- 1943: Arctic Sun
- 1944: Knight's Emblem
- 1945: Linaria
- 1946: Dublin Town
- 1947: Asylum
- 1948: Fair Edwine
- 1949: Monseigneur
- 1950: Ralootown
- 1951: Stackallen Bridge
- 1952: Legend of Confey
- 1953: Tale of Two Cities
- 1954: Hugh Lupus
- 1955: Closed Shop
- 1956: Katty's Star
- 1957: Vestogan
- 1958: Princess Marie
- 1959: Le Levanstell
- 1960: Travel Light
- 1961: Gay Challenger
- 1962: Turbo Jet
- 1963: Mesopotamia
- 1964: Ga-Greine
- 1965: Glad Rags
- 1966: Adrian's Path
- 1967: Sans-Fin
- 1968: Sahib
- 1969: Nijinsky
- 1970: Minsky
- 1971: Open Season
- 1972: Park Lawn
- 1973: Misty Bend
- 1974: Tender Camilla
- 1975: Niebo
- 1976: Brahms
- 1977: Thunor
- 1978: Solar
- 1979: Noble Shamus

== See also ==
- Horse racing in Ireland
- List of Irish flat horse races
