= Mantovani (horse) =

Irish-bred Thoroughbred racehorse

- Sire: Treasure Kay
- Grandsire: Mummy's Pet
- Dam: Dream of Spring
- Damsire: Hello Gorgeous
- Sex: Stallion
- Foaled: 1 February 1994
- Country: Ireland
- Colour: Bay
- Breeder: F Salhoub
- Owner: Jackie Bolger & John Corcoran; Godolphin
- Trainer: Jim Bolger; Saeed bin Suroor
- Record: 8: 2-1-0
- Earnings: £97,045

Major wins
- Phoenix Stakes (1996)

Mantovani (foaled 1 February 1994) was an Irish-bred Thoroughbred racehorse. He showed his best form as a two-year-old in 1996 when he won two of his three races including a 20/1 upset victory in the Phoenix Stakes. After being transferred to Godolphin he was off the racecourse for four years before finishing unplaced in five starts in the United Arab Emirates.

== Background ==
Mantovani was a bay horse bred in Ireland by F Salhoub. He entered the ownership of Jackie Bolger in partnership with John Corcoran and was sent into training with Jim Bolger at Coolcullen, County Carlow.

He was probably the best horse sired by Treasure Kay, a sprinter who recorded his biggest win in the 1987 Temple Stakes. Mantovani's dam Dream of Spring was an unraced mare, but was descended from Legendra (foaled 1944) who was the female-line ancestor of Shareef Dancer and Zenyatta.

== Racing career ==
=== 1996: two-year-old season ===
Mantovani made his racecourse debut on 12 June in a minor race over six furlongs at Leopardstown Racecourse in which he started at odds of 11/4 and finished second of the seven runners, beaten a short head by the Kevin Prendergast-trained favourite Quws. On 6 July the colt started 4/7 favourite for a maiden race over the same course and distance. Ridden as on his debut by Kevin Manning, he recorded his first success as he won by three quarters of a length from the filly Maratana.

Despite suffering from sore shins which disrupted his training, Mantovani was then moved up sharply in class and started a 20/1 outsider for the Group 1 Phoenix Stakes on 11 August. The Coventry Stakes winner Verglas started favourite, while the other seven runners included Ocean Ridge (Prix Robert Papin), Azra (Silver Flash Stakes) and Raphane (Curragh Stakes). Manning was aboard Azra, the Bolger stable's more fancied runner, and so the ride on Mantovani went to Conor Everard. After racing just behind the leaders Mantovani "squeezed" though a gap along the inside rail a furlong out, took the lead and kept on well to win by two lengths from the British challenger Muchea. Jim Bolger commented I knew he would handle the ground. I had planned to run him in the Anglesea Stakes but plans will now have to be changed".

In the autumn of 1996 Mantovani was bought privately by Sheikh Mohammed's Godolphin organisation and was transferred to the stable of Saeed bin Suroor.

=== Later career ===
In the winter of 1996/97 Mantovani was sent to be trained at Godolphin's base in the United Arab Emirates. He appears to have had serious training problems and missed the next four seasons before finally returning to the track as a six-year-old in 2000. He ran twice in that year, finishing unplaced in two handicap races in December at Nad Al Sheba Racecourse and Jebel Ali. On 25 January 2001 Mantovani finished fifth of the ten runners behind March Crusader in a handicap race over 1500 metres at Nad Al Sheba Racecourse. In the following month he finished fourth in a handicap over 1400 metres at Ghantoot Racecourse. On his final start he finished sixth at Nad Al Sheba in April.

Mantovani does not appear to have stood as a breeding stallion and has no recorded offspring.

== Pedigree ==
Pedigree of Mantovani (IRE), bay stallion, 1994
Sire Treasure Kay (GB) 1983	Mummy's Pet (GB); 1968	Sing Sing	Tudor Minstrel
Sire Treasure Kay (GB) 1983	Mummy's Pet (GB); 1968	Sing Sing	Agin the Law
Sire Treasure Kay (GB) 1983	Mummy's Pet (GB); 1968	Money for Nothing	Grey Sovereign
Sire Treasure Kay (GB) 1983	Mummy's Pet (GB); 1968	Money for Nothing	Sweet Nothings
Sire Treasure Kay (GB) 1983	Welsh Blossom (GB); 1975	Welsh Saint	St Paddy
Sire Treasure Kay (GB) 1983	Welsh Blossom (GB); 1975	Welsh Saint	Welsh Way
Sire Treasure Kay (GB) 1983	Welsh Blossom (GB); 1975	Riding High	Hard Ridden
Sire Treasure Kay (GB) 1983	Welsh Blossom (GB); 1975	Riding High	Bridge of Stars
Dam Dream of Spring (IRE) 1983	Hello Gorgeous (USA); 1977	Mr Prospector	Raise A Native
Dam Dream of Spring (IRE) 1983	Hello Gorgeous (USA); 1977	Mr Prospector	Gold Digger
Dam Dream of Spring (IRE) 1983	Hello Gorgeous (USA); 1977	Bonny Jet	Jet Jewel
Dam Dream of Spring (IRE) 1983	Hello Gorgeous (USA); 1977	Bonny Jet	Bonny Bush
Dam Dream of Spring (IRE) 1983	Bold Sands (USA); 1977	Wajima	Bold Ruler
Dam Dream of Spring (IRE) 1983	Bold Sands (USA); 1977	Wajima	Iskra
Dam Dream of Spring (IRE) 1983	Bold Sands (USA); 1977	Slapton Sands	First Landing
Dam Dream of Spring (IRE) 1983	Bold Sands (USA); 1977	Slapton Sands	Legendra (Family: 4-r)
