= Beethoven (horse) =

Irish-bred Thoroughbred racehorse

- Sire: Oratorio
- Grandsire: Danehill
- Dam: Queen Titi
- Damsire: Sadler's Wells
- Sex: Stallion
- Foaled: 2 April 2007
- Country: Ireland
- Colour: Bay
- Breeder: Whisperview Trading Ltd
- Owner: Michael Tabor, Susan Magnier & Derrick Smith; Mohammed Kazim Al Ansari & Sons
- Trainer: Aidan O'Brien; Ahmed Kobeissi
- Record: 63: 8-5-6
- Earnings: £495,018

Major wins
- Dewhurst Stakes (2009); Desmond Stakes (2010); Qatar Derby (2010)

Beethoven (foaled 2 April 2007) is an Irish-bred Thoroughbred racehorse best known for his upset victory in the 2009 Dewhurst Stakes. He was highly tried as a juvenile and ran prominently in several major races before winning the Dewhurst on his tenth appearance of the season at odds of 33/1. As a three-year-old he won the Desmond Stakes and ended his year with a success in the Qatar Derby. He was based in Qatar for the rest of his racing career, making his last appearance in 2015.

== Background ==
Beethoven is a bay horse with a small white star bred in Ireland by Whisperview Trading Ltd, a breeding company owned by the trainer Aidan O'Brien. As a yearling the colt was consigned by the Carriganog Stud to the Goffs Million sale in September 2008 and was bought for 260,000 euros by Hugo Merry Bloodstock on behalf of John Magnier's Coolmore Stud organisation. The colt was sent into training with Aidan O'Brien at Ballydoyle. Like many Coolmore horses, the official details of Beethoven's ownership changed from race to race; he was sometimes listed as being the property of Michael Tabor, whilst on other occasions he was described as being owned by a partnership of Tabor, Derrick Smith and Susan Magnier.

Beethoven was from the first crop of foals sired by Oratorio a top-class performer over ten furlongs who won the Eclipse Stakes and the Irish Champion Stakes in 2005. As a breeding stallion the best of his other offspring have included Military Attack, the Italian champion Biz the Nurse and the Golden Rose Stakes winner Manawanui. Beethoven was the first foal of his dam Queen Titi, a useful racemare who won the Listed Garnet Stakes at Naas Racecourse in 2005. She was bred and owned by Anne-Marie O'Brien and trained by her husband Aidan. Queen Titi is a granddaughter of Luv Luvin', an American broodmare whose other descendants have included Henrythenavigator, Magician and the Irish 2000 Guineas winner Saffron Walden.

== Racing career ==
=== 2009: two-year-old season ===
Beethoven began his racing career in a maiden race over six furlongs at York Racecourse in England on 14 May in which he started the 9/4 favourite but finished third of the ten runners behind No Hubris and Flying Statesman. At Naas Racecourse on 1 June he started odds-on favourite for a minor event and led for most of the way before being overtaken inside the final furlong and beaten a head into second place by the Ger Lyons-trained gelding Love Lockdown. Despite his defeats, Beethoven was then stepped up in class and distance for the Listed Chesham Stakes over seven furlongs at Royal Ascot on 20 June and started the 4/1 joint-favourite alongside his stablemate Emperor Claudius. He was in contention from the start but never looked likely to win and finished fourth, three and a quarter lengths behind the Richard Hannon Sr-trained Big Audio. In July he ran twice at the Curragh, finishing third to Walk On Bye in the Group Three Anglesey Stakes and fifth to his stablemate Alfred Nobel in the Group One Phoenix Stakes. On 6 August the colt was dropped back in class for a maiden race over six furlongs at Leopardstown Racecourse and started the 4/7 favourite in an eleven-runner field. Ridden as in three of his five previous starts by Johnny Murtagh, he took the lead after two furlongs and stayed on in the closing stages to win by a head form Clashnacree.

Beethoven ran twice at the Curragh in September, finishing third to Kingsfort when a 25/1 outsider for the Group One National Stakes and fourth (of twenty) when favourite for the Goffs Million Sprint. On 4 October he was sent to France and was Ireland's only representative in the Group One Prix Jean-Luc Lagardère over 1400 metres at Longchamp Racecourse. Starting at odds of 16/1 in a seven-runner field he was never able to challenge the leaders and finished sixth behind Siyouni. Thirteen days after his run in France Beethoven was one of fifteen colts to contest the Group One Dewhurst Stakes over seven furlongs at Newmarket Racecourse. Ridden by Ryan Moore he was part of a four-horse O'Brien entry which also included Steinbeck (the choice of the stable jockey Johnny Murtagh), Fencing Master and Lord High Admiral and started a 33/1 outsider. The National Stakes runner-up Chabal started favourite ahead of Steinbeck and Xtension whilst the other runners included Silver Grecian (Superlative Stakes), Dick Turpin (Richmond Stakes) and Buzzword (Prix La Rochette). Equipped with a visor for the first time Beethoven was settled behind the leaders by Moore as Pure Champion set the early pace. After briefly looking to be outpaced a quarter of a mile from the finish he was switched to the right and began to make rapid progress approaching the final furlong. In a four-way "blanket finish" he gained the advantage with 50 yards to run and prevailed by a neck, a nose and a neck from Fencing Master, Xtension and Steinbeck. Aidan O'Brien said "He's a very tough horse and he's been improving all the time. He's been getting better with every run even if the figures don't show that. During the week Joseph was riding him and said that there's lots there, and to put a visor on him to sharpen him up".

On his final appearance of the year, Beethoven was sent to California to contest the Breeders' Cup Juvenile over 8 1/2 furlongs on the synthetic Cushion Track at Santa Anita Park on 7 November. After racing towards the rear of the thirteen-runner field he made steady progress in the straight to finish sixth, less than three lengths behind the winner Vale of York.

=== 2010: three-year-old season ===
Beethoven had been expected to challenge for the 2000 Guineas but missed the race after a training setback. He did not appear as a three-year-old until June when he finished sixth of nine behind Canford Cliffs in the St James's Palace Stakes at Royal Ascot. In the following month he was matched against older horses for the first time in the Sussex Stakes at Goodwood Racecourse and finished fourth behind Canford Cliffs, Rip Van Winkle and Premio Loco. On 12 August Beethoven was dropped in class for the Group Three Desmond Stakes over one mile at Leopardstown and started the 2/1 favourite with the best of his five opponents appearing to be the (Blue Wind Stakes) winner Akdarena. Ridden by Joseph O'Brien he tracked Akdarena before taking the lead a furlong and a half from the finish and winning "comfortably" by three quarters of a length from Dandy Boy. Joseph O'Brien, who was winning his first Group race, said "He quickened up really well when I asked and it was a good performance. He can’t have the ground fast enough, so it suited him well tonight".

In September Beethoven stepped back up to Group One class and finished fourth to Cape Blanco in the Irish Champion Stakes at Leopardstown and fourth in the Queen Elizabeth II Stakes at Ascot behind Poet's Voice. After finishing sixth to Gitano Hernando at Dundalk Racecourse he was sent to the United States to contest his second Breeders' Cup at Churchill Downs on 6 November. He started a 25/1 outsider for the Breeders' Cup Mile and finished tenth of the eleven runners behind Goldikova. In December the colt was shipped to Sha Tin Racecourse for the Hong Kong Mile but made little impact as he finished unplaced behind Beauty Flash.

Shortly after his race in Hong Kong Beethoven was acquired by Mohammed Kazim Al Ansari & Sons and relocated to Qatar where he was trained by Ahmed Kobeissi. On his first appearance for his new connections Beethoven contested the Qatar Derby over ten furlongs at Doha on 23 December. Ridden by Seb Sanders he took the lead 2 1/2 furlongs from the finish, went clear of the field and held off the late challenge of the French colt Lancelot to win by a neck.

=== 2011 – 2015: later career ===
Beethoven continued his racing career in Qatar. On his 2011 debut in the HH Heir Apparent Trophy at Doha on 27 January he produced a strong late finish to win by half a length from Miss Starlight with Lancelot and Joshua Tree in third and fourth. He failed to win in seven subsequent starts that year and was beaten in all eleven of his races as a five-year-old in 2012. In 2013 he ran ten times, recording his only victory in a minor event at Doha in April. He was unplaced in both his starts in 2014 and in his only recorded race as an eight-year-old in 2015.

== Assessment ==
In the 2009 European Thoroughbred Rankings, Beethoven was given a rating of 117, making him the eighth-best juvenile of the year, seven pounds behind the top-rated St Nicholas Abbey.

== Pedigree ==
Pedigree of Beethoven (IRE), bay horse, 2007
Sire Oratorio (IRE) 2002	Danehill (USA); 1986	Danzig	Northern Dancer
Sire Oratorio (IRE) 2002	Danehill (USA); 1986	Danzig	Pas de Nom
Sire Oratorio (IRE) 2002	Danehill (USA); 1986	Razyana	His Majesty
Sire Oratorio (IRE) 2002	Danehill (USA); 1986	Razyana	Spring Adieu
Sire Oratorio (IRE) 2002	Mahrah (USA); 1987	Vaguely Noble	Vienna
Sire Oratorio (IRE) 2002	Mahrah (USA); 1987	Vaguely Noble	Noble Lassie
Sire Oratorio (IRE) 2002	Mahrah (USA); 1987	Montage	Alydar
Sire Oratorio (IRE) 2002	Mahrah (USA); 1987	Montage	Katonka
Dam Queen Titi (IRE) 2002	Sadler's Wells (USA); 1981	Northern Dancer	Nearctic
Dam Queen Titi (IRE) 2002	Sadler's Wells (USA); 1981	Northern Dancer	Natalma
Dam Queen Titi (IRE) 2002	Sadler's Wells (USA); 1981	Fairy Bridge	Bold Reason
Dam Queen Titi (IRE) 2002	Sadler's Wells (USA); 1981	Fairy Bridge	Special
Dam Queen Titi (IRE) 2002	Litani River (USA); 1986	Irish River	Riverman
Dam Queen Titi (IRE) 2002	Litani River (USA); 1986	Irish River	Irish Star
Dam Queen Titi (IRE) 2002	Litani River (USA); 1986	Luv Luvin'	Raise a Native
Dam Queen Titi (IRE) 2002	Litani River (USA); 1986	Luv Luvin'	Ringing Bells (Family: 9-b)

- Beethoven was inbred 3 × 4 to Northern Dancer, meaning that this stallion appears in both the third and fourth generations of his pedigree.
