= Nebbiolo (horse) =

British-bred Thoroughbred racehorse

- Sire: Yellow God
- Grandsire: Red God
- Dam: Novara
- Damsire: Birkhahn
- Sex: Stallion
- Foaled: 1974
- Country: Ireland
- Colour: Chestnut
- Breeder: Niels Schibbye
- Owner: Niels Schibbye
- Trainer: Kevin Prendergast
- Record: 12:6-2-2

Major wins
- Curragh Stakes (1976); Gimcrack Stakes (1976); 2000 Guineas (1977)

Nebbiolo (1974–1980) was a British-bred, Irish-trained Thoroughbred racehorse and sire. In a career that lasted from May 1976 to July 1977 he ran twelve times and won six races. He won five times as a two-year-old including the Curragh Stakes in Ireland and the Gimcrack Stakes in England. In the following year he recorded his most important victory when he defeated The Minstrel in the 2000 Guineas at Newmarket. After failing to win in three subsequent races he was retired to stud where he showed considerable promise before his death in 1980.

== Background ==
Nebbiolo was a strongly-built chestnut horse with a white blaze and white socks on his hind legs. He was sired by the Gimcrack Stakes winner Yellow God out of the German-bred mare Novara. The Danish businessman Niels Schibbye had owned Novara during a racing career which saw her win several good races in Germany, but sold her after an operation an ovarian cyst was thought to have rendered her useless as a broodmare. When Novara proved to be fertile, Schibbye bought her back for 11,000 guineas in December 1973. She was in foal (pregnant) to Yellow God at the time and the colt foal who would be named Nebbiolo was delivered the following spring. Schibbye sent Nebbiolo to the sales as a yearling in October 1975, but he failed to reach his reserve price of 3,000 guineas. He then turned down a private offer when he learned that the colt's prospective owners intended to have him gelded and trained for a National Hunt career. Schibbye instead decided to race the colt in his own colours and sent him to be trained in Ireland by Kevin Prendergast.

== Racing career ==
=== 1976: two-year-old season ===
Nebbiolo began his career in May when he finished third in a race at Leopardstown Racecourse. He claimed his first win by taking the Eadestown Stakes at Naas over five furlongs and followed up by winning the Irish Chorus Stakes over six furlongs at Navan. In July, Nebbiolo was moved up to Group Three class and won the Curragh Stakes over five furlongs at the Curragh before stepping up in distance to take the seven furlong Arnott Stakes at Phoenix Park. Having won four races in succession, Nebbiolo was sent to England for his next start and ran the Group Two Gimcrack Stakes at York in August. A furlong from the finish he appeared to be struggling but "buckled down in great style" to record a decisive two and a half length win over Forty Winks. On his final start of the year, Nebbiolo travelled to England again for one of the season's most important two-year-old races, the Group One Middle Park Stakes at Newmarket in October. He ran on well under strong pressure in the closing stages to finish second to Tachypous, beaten one length.

In the Free Handicap, a ranking of the season's best two-year-olds, Nebbiolo was given a rating of 122, eleven pounds behind the top-rated J. O. Tobin.

=== 1977: three-year-old season ===
Nebbiolo began his three-year-old season in the Vauxhall Trial Stakes at Phoenix Park in April and finished second, a length behind Milverton, who was carrying seven pounds less. In the 2000 Guineas at Newmarket, Nebbiolo was ridden by Gabriel "Squibs" Curran and started at odds of 20/1 in a field of eighteen runners, with another Irish-trained colt, The Minstrel, starting 6/5 favourite. After being restrained in the early stages he made steady progress from three furlongs out and took the lead entering the final furlong. In the closing stages he ran on strongly to win by a length from Tachypous with The Minstrel a further length away in third. Two weeks later, Nebbiolo attempted to become the second 2000 Guineas winner, after Right Tack in 1969, to also win the Irish 2,000 Guineas at the Curragh. He was hampered in the straight when his jockey attempted to find a clear run and finished third, beaten a short head and a length by Pampapaul and The Minstrel.

At Epsom in June he ran in the Derby despite doubts that he would be effective over the one and a half mile distance and finished sixth of the twenty-two runners behind The Minstrel. He was brought back to one mile for his next race in the Sussex Stakes at Goodwood in July but failed to show his best form and finished unplaced behind Artaius. He did not race again and was retired to stud.

== Assessment ==
As a three-year-old, Nebbiolo was given an end of year rating of 125 by Timeform.

== Stud career ==
Nebbiolo was retired to stand at the Irish National Stud as a dual-purpose stallion, and made a highly promising start to his stud career before dying at the age of six in 1980. His winners on the flat included Sondrio (Hialeah Turf Cup Handicap), Superlative (Flying Childers Stakes), Annie Edge (New York Stakes, dam of Selkirk), Executive Man (Premio Primi Passi), Santella Man (Queen's Vase) and Kayudee (Cesarewitch Handicap). His best horse however, was probably the steeplechaser Barnbrook Again, who won eighteen races including the Queen Mother Champion Chase at the Cheltenham Festival.

== Pedigree ==
Pedigree of Nebbiolo (GB), chestnut stallion, 1974
Sire Yellow God (GB) 1967	Red God; 1954	Nasrullah	Nearco
Sire Yellow God (GB) 1967	Red God; 1954	Nasrullah	Mumtaz Begum
Sire Yellow God (GB) 1967	Red God; 1954	Spring Run	Menow
Sire Yellow God (GB) 1967	Red God; 1954	Spring Run	Boola Brook
Sire Yellow God (GB) 1967	Sally Deans; 1947	Fun Fair	Fair Trial
Sire Yellow God (GB) 1967	Sally Deans; 1947	Fun Fair	Humoresque
Sire Yellow God (GB) 1967	Sally Deans; 1947	Cora Deans	Coronach
Sire Yellow God (GB) 1967	Sally Deans; 1947	Cora Deans	Jennie Deans
Dam Novara (GER) 1965	Birkhahn; 1945	Alchimist	Herold
Dam Novara (GER) 1965	Birkhahn; 1945	Alchimist	Aversion
Dam Novara (GER) 1965	Birkhahn; 1945	Bramouse	Cappiello
Dam Novara (GER) 1965	Birkhahn; 1945	Bramouse	Peregrine
Dam Novara (GER) 1965	Norbelle; 1957	Norman	Norseman
Dam Novara (GER) 1965	Norbelle; 1957	Norman	Macreuse
Dam Novara (GER) 1965	Norbelle; 1957	Mirabelle	Sind
Dam Novara (GER) 1965	Norbelle; 1957	Mirabelle	Mitidja (Family:19-c)
