= Michael Kinane =

Irish former flat racing jockey (born 1959)

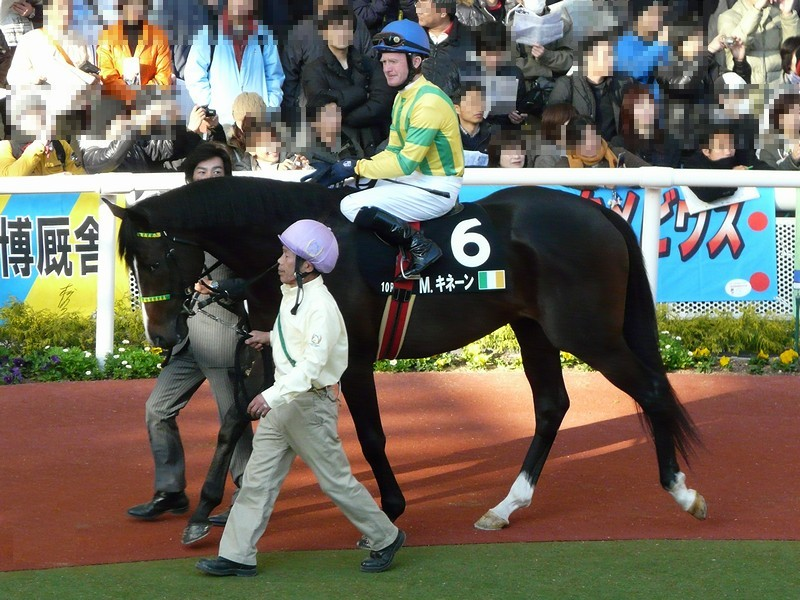
- Michael Kinane (on the horse) in 2009

Personal information
- Born: 22 June 1959 (age 67) Killenaule, County Tipperary, Ireland
- Occupation: Jockey

Horse racing career
- Sport: Horse racing

Major racing wins
- British Classic Races: 2000 Guineas Stakes (1990, 1997, 1998, 2009); St Leger Stakes (2001); Derby Stakes (1993, 2001, 2009); Oaks Stakes (1998, 2001); Irish Classic Races; Irish 1,000 Guineas (1988, 2003, 2005); Irish 2,000 Guineas (1982, 1986, 2002); Irish Oaks (1989, 1996); Irish Derby (2001, 2002); Irish St. Leger (1993, 1994, 2006, 2009); Other major British races: Gold Cup (1996, 2000, 2007); Champion Stakes (1997); Cheveley Park Stakes (1995, 2005); Coronation Cup (2007); Coronation Stakes (1994, 2002); Dewhurst Stakes (2001); Eclipse Stakes (1993, 1997, 2002, 2009); Falmouth Stakes (1996); Fillies' Mile (1996, 1998); Flying Five Stakes (1985, 1991, 1993, 1994, 2001, 2004); Futurity Trophy (1997); Goodwood Cup (2000, 2002, 2005, 2006); International Stakes (2000, 2005, 2009); July Cup (1999, 2001); King George VI and Queen Elizabeth Stakes (1990, 1994, 2000, 2001, 2005); Lockinge Stakes (2003); Middle Park Stakes (2000, 2001); Nunthorpe Stakes (1999, 2001); Queen Anne Stakes (1993, 1994, 1996); Queen Elizabeth II Stakes (2006); Queen Elizabeth II Jubilee Stakes (1987, 2005); St. James's Palace Stakes (1982, 1992, 1994, 2000, 2002, 2004); Sussex Stakes (1998, 2000, 2002, 2005); Yorkshire Oaks (2006); Other major Irish races Irish Champion Stakes (1989, 1994, 1997, 2000, 2003, 2004, 2009); Matron Stakes (1994, 1997); Moyglare Stud Stakes (1987, 2001, 2003); Phoenix Stakes (1983, 1999, 2000, 2001, 2003); Vincent O'Brien National Stakes (1994, 1998, 2001, 2003); Pretty Polly Stakes (1992, 1996, 1997); Tattersalls Gold Cup (1987, 1995, 1996, 1997, 2000, 2003); Major international races Criterium de Saint-Cloud (2002); Grosser Preis von Bayern (1992, 1993, 1996); Prix de l'Abbaye de Longchamp (1985); Prix de Royallieu (1995); Prix Maurice de Gheest (1992); Prix Jean-Luc Lagardere (1997, 1999, 2001); Prix du Moulin de Longchamp (2002); Prix Morny (1998, 1999, 2001); Prix de la Foret (2004); Prix Vermeille (2000); Prix du Cadran (2009); Jebel Hatta (2008); Poule d'Essai des Poulains (2002); Prix de l'Arc de Triomphe (1989, 1999, 2009); Bayerisches Zuchtrennen (1993); Poule d'Essai des Pouliches (2001); Al Maktoum Challenge, Round 3 (2005)

Racing awards
- Irish flat racing Champion Jockey (1984, 1985, 1986, 1987, 1988, 1989, 1991, 1992, 1993, 1994, 1999, 2002, 2003)

Significant horses
- Alandi, Alberto Giacometti, Alexandrova, Alflora, Alydaress, Among Men, Azamour, Barathea, Belmez, Big Shuffle, Black Sam Bellamy, Blue Duster, Brief Truce, Cape of Good Hope, Carroll House, Cezanne, Charnwood Forest, Chiquitin, Ciro, Classic Cliche, Clerio, Cockney Lass, Commander in Chief, Committed, Dance Design, Dara Monarch, Definite Article, Distinction, Donna Blini, Electrocutionist, Entrepreneur, Eternal Reve, Fasliyev, Flowing, Flutter Away, Galileo, George Washington, Giant's Causeway, Grand Lodge, Hawk Wing, High Chaparral, Imagine, Ishiguru, Jardine's Lookout, Johannesburg, Kastoria, Kayf Tara, King Persian, King of Kings, King's Theatre, Kissing Cousin, Landseer, Lord Admiral, Luso, Market Booster, Milan, Minardi, Monsun, Montjeu, Mozart, Mus-If, Necklace, One Cool Cat, Opera House, Orpen, Pilsudski, Prince of Andros, Proclamation, Pursuit of Love, Quarter Moon, Reams of Verse, Ringmoor Down, Rock of Gibraltar, Rose Gypsy, Royal Rebel, Russian Snows, Saoire, Saratoga Springs, Scorpion, Sea the Stars, Second Empire, Sensation, Shahtoush, Somnus, Sophisticat, Stravinsky, Sunspangled, Tel Quel, Tirol, Tropical, Trusted Partner, Vintage Crop, Volvoreta, Yeats, Yesterday
- Updated on 24 October 2023

1000 Guineas (0)

2000 Guineas (4)
1990
Tirol	Machiavellian	Anshan
1997
Entrepreneur	Revoque	Poteen
1998
King Of Kings	Lend A Hand	Border Arrow
2009
Sea The Stars	Delegator	Gan Amhras

Derby (3)
1993
Commander In Chief	Blue Judge	Blues Traveller
2001
Galileo	Golan	Tobougg
2009
Sea The Stars	Fame And Glory	Masterofthehorse

Oaks (2)
1998
Shahtoush	Bahr	Midnight Line
2001
Imagine	Flight of Fancy	Relish The Thought

St Leger (1)
2001
Milan	Demophilos	Mr Combustible

Michael J. Kinane (born 22 June 1959) is an Irish former flat racing jockey. He had a 34-year career, retiring on 8 December 2009.

A prolific winner of the Irish, English and French Classic races over two decades, Kinane has ridden winners in the 2,000 Guineas four times, The Derby three times, the Melbourne Cup in Australia and, in the United States, the Belmont Stakes once. Kinane also has four wins in Breeders' Cup races. He has been Irish Champion Jockey on 13 occasions.

He first came to prominence as the stable jockey to Liam Browne winning the 1982 Irish 2000 Guineas and St James Palace Stakes at Ascot, both on Dara Monarch, and finishing 2nd in the 1983 Epsom Derby on Carlingford Castle, before moving to Dermot Weld. He was later retained by John Magnier and Aidan O'Brien as stable jockey at Ballydoyle for many years prior to joining leading Irish flat trainer John Oxx. He became one of the world's elite jockeys and excelled on the big occasions at Longchamp and Epsom, and was regarded as one of the leading professionals of his sport.

He retired "on an incredible high," in his own words, at the end of 2009, a season which witnessed him ride Sea The Stars to six Group One wins, including an unprecedented 2000 Guineas-Derby-Arc treble. He bred the 2007 Epsom Derby winner Authorized.

== Post-jockey career ==
Michael Kinane is current working for Hong Kong Jockey Club in Europe to select horses suitable for running in Hong Kong. Those horses are resold by Hong Kong Jockey Club in an auction.

== Personal life ==
His father, Tommy Kinane, was a leading National Hunt jockey who won the Champion Hurdle on Monksfield.

== Major wins ==
(United Kingdom) Great Britain

- 2,000 Guineas – (4) – Tirol (1990), Entrepreneur (1997), King of Kings (1998), Sea the Stars (2009)
- Ascot Gold Cup – (3) – Classic Cliche (1996), Kayf Tara (2000), Yeats (2007)
- Champion Stakes – (1) – Pilsudski (1997)
- Cheveley Park Stakes – (2) – Blue Duster (1995), Donna Blini (2005)
- Coronation Cup – (1) – Scorpion (2007)
- Coronation Stakes – (2) – Kissing Cousin (1994), Sophisticat (2002)
- Derby – (3) – Commander in Chief (1993), Galileo (2001), Sea the Stars (2009)
- Dewhurst Stakes – (1) – Rock of Gibraltar (2001)
- Eclipse Stakes – (4) – Opera House (1993), Pilsudski (1997), Hawk Wing (2002), Sea the Stars (2009)
- Falmouth Stakes – (1) – Sensation (1996)
- Fillies' Mile – (2) – Reams of Verse (1996), Sunspangled (1998)
- Golden Jubilee Stakes – (2) – Big Shuffle (1987), Cape of Good Hope (2005)
- International Stakes – (3) – Giant's Causeway (2000), Electrocutionist (2005), Sea the Stars (2009)
- July Cup – (2) – Stravinsky (1999), Mozart (2001)
- King George VI and Queen Elizabeth Stakes – (5) – Belmez (1990), King's Theatre (1994), Montjeu (2000), Galileo (2001), Azamour (2005)
- Lockinge Stakes – (1) – Hawk Wing (2003)
- Middle Park Stakes – (2) – Minardi (2000), Johannesburg (2001)
- Nunthorpe Stakes – (2) – Stravinsky (1999), Mozart (2001)
- Oaks – (2) – Shahtoush (1998), Imagine (2001)
- Prince of Wales's Stakes – (2) – Lear Spear (1999), Azamour (2005)
- Queen Anne Stakes – (3) – Alflora (1993), Barathea (1994), Charnwood Forest (1996)
- Queen Elizabeth II Stakes – (1) – George Washington (2006)
- Racing Post Trophy – (1) – Saratoga Springs (1997)
- St. James's Palace Stakes – (6) – Dara Monarch (1982), Brief Truce (1992), Grand Lodge (1994), Giant's Causeway (2000), Rock of Gibraltar (2002), Azamour (2004)
- St. Leger Stakes – (1) – Milan (2001)
- Sussex Stakes – (4) – Among Men (1998), Giant's Causeway (2000), Rock of Gibraltar (2002), Proclamation (2005)
- Yorkshire Oaks – (1) – Alexandrova (2006)

(Republic of Ireland) Ireland

- Irish 1,000 Guineas – (3) – Trusted Partner (1988), Yesterday (2003), Saoire (2005)
- Irish 2,000 Guineas – (3) – Dara Monarch (1982), Flash of Steel (1986), Rock of Gibraltar (2002)
- Irish Champion Stakes – (7) – Carroll House (1989), Cézanne (1994), Pilsudski (1997), Giant's Causeway (2000), High Chaparral (2003), Azamour (2004), Sea the Stars (2009)
- Irish Derby – (2) – Galileo (2001), High Chaparral (2002)
- Irish Oaks – (2) – Alydaress (1989), Dance Design (1996)
- Irish St. Leger – (4) – Vintage Crop (1993, 1994), Kastoria (2006), Alandi (2009)
- Matron Stakes – (2) – Eternal Reve (1994), Clerio (1997)
- Moyglare Stud Stakes – (3) – Flutter Away (1987), Quarter Moon (2001), Necklace (2003)
- National Stakes – (4) – Definite Article (1994), Mus-If (1998), Hawk Wing (2001), One Cool Cat (2003)
- Phoenix Stakes – (5) – King Persian (1983), Fasliyev (1999), Minardi (2000), Johannesburg (2001), One Cool Cat (2003)
- Pretty Polly Stakes – (3) – Market Booster (1992), Dance Design (1996, 1997)
- Tattersalls Gold Cup – (6) – Cockney Lass (1987), Prince of Andros (1995), Definite Article (1996), Dance Design (1997), Montjeu (2000), Black Sam Bellamy (2003)

Australia

- Melbourne Cup – (1) – Vintage Crop (1993)

Canada

- Canadian International – (1) – Ballingarry (2002)

France

- Critérium de Saint-Cloud – (1) – Alberto Giacometti (2002)
- Poule d'Essai des Poulains – (1) – Landseer (2002)
- Poule d'Essai des Pouliches – (1) – Rose Gypsy (2001)
- Prix de l'Abbaye de Longchamp – (1) – Committed (1985)
- Prix de l'Arc de Triomphe – (3) – Carroll House (1989), Montjeu (1999), Sea the Stars (2009)
- Prix du Cadran – (1) – Alandi (2009)
- Prix de la Forêt – (1) – Somnus (2004)
- Prix Jean-Luc Lagardère – (3) – Second Empire (1997), Ciro (1999), Rock of Gibraltar (2001)
- Prix Lupin – (1) – Ciro (2000)
- Prix Maurice de Gheest – (1) – Pursuit of Love (1992)
- Prix Morny – (3) – Orpen (1998), Fasliyev (1999), Johannesburg (2001)
- Prix du Moulin de Longchamp – (1) – Rock of Gibraltar (2002)
- Prix de la Salamandre – (1) – Giant's Causeway (1999)
- Prix Vermeille – (1) – Volvoreta (2000)

Germany

- Aral-Pokal – (3) – Tel Quel (1992), Monsun (1993), Luso (1996)
- Bayerisches Zuchtrennen – (1) – Market Booster (1993)

Hong Kong

- Champions Mile – (1) – Able One (2007)
- Hong Kong Mile – (2) – Additional Risk (1991), Winning Partners (1993)
- Hong Kong Champions & Chater Cup – (2) – Viva Pataca (2006, 2007)
- Hong Kong Cup – (1) – Precision (2002)
- Hong Kong Derby – (2) – Sound Print (1992), Che Sara Sara (1996)
- Hong Kong Gold Cup – (1) – Idol (2001)
- Hong Kong Vase – (1) – Luso (1997)
- Stewards' Cup – (1) – Sound Print (1992)
- Queen Elizabeth II Cup – (3) – Deerfield (1994), Red Bishop (1995), Viva Pataca (2007)

India

- Indian 1000 Guineas – (1) – Nauvkhal (1986)
- Indian 2000 Guineas – (2) – Eversun (1984), Sir Bruce (1985)
- Indian Derby – (3) – Sir Bruce (1986), Cordon Bleu (1988), HotStepper (2008)
- Indian Oaks – (3) – Revelation (1985), Silver Haven (1986), Golden Treasure (1990)
- Calcutta 1000 Guineas – (1) – Wheels (1983)
- Golconda Derby – (1) – Deccan Star (1984)

Italy

- Derby Italiano – (2) – In a Tiff (1992), Luso (1995)
- Gran Criterium – (2) – Sholokhov (2001), Spartacus (2002)
- Gran Premio del Jockey Club – (1) – Black Sam Bellamy (2002)
- Premio Parioli – (2) – Again Tomorrow (1985), Gay Burslem (1988)
- Premio Roma – (1) – Welsh Guide (1988)

Japan

- Japan Cup – (1) – Pilsudski (1997)
- Hanshin Juvenile Fillies – (1) – Yamakatsu Suzuran (1999)

Slovakia

- Slovenské Derby – (1) – Temirkanov (1998)

United States

- Belmont Stakes – (1) – Go And Go (1990)
- Breeders' Cup Juvenile – (1) – Johannesburg (2001)
- Breeders' Cup Turf – (2) – High Chaparral (2002, 2003 dead-heat)
- Secretariat Stakes – (1) – Ciro (2000)

== See also ==
- List of jockeys

Sporting positions
Preceded by None	Ballydoyle retained jockey 1999-2003	Succeeded by Jamie Spencer
