= Kevin Prendergast =

Irish racehorse trainer (1932–2025)

- Born: 5 July 1932; Melbourne, Australia
- Died: 20 June 2025 (aged 92)
- Occupation: Racehorse trainer

Kevin Prendergast (5 July 1932 – 20 June 2025) was an Australian-born Irish racehorse trainer.

== Life and career ==
Prendergast was born in Melbourne, Australia, on 5 July 1932, to Irish racehorse trainer Paddy Prendergast.

Originally a jockey, Prendergast obtained a trainer's licence in 1963. Throughout his career, he trained several championship-winning horses, including Nebbiolo, Pidget, Artique Royale, Northern Treasure, Oscar Schindler and Conor Pass.

In 2023, he reportedly listed his stables for sale. Prendergast, who was predeceased by his wife, died on 20 June 2025, at the age of 92.

== Major wins ==
(Republic of Ireland) Ireland

- 1000 Guineas - (2) - Pidget (1972), Arctique Royale (1981)
- 2000 Guineas - (2) - Northern Treasure (1976), Awtaad (2016)
- Irish St. Leger - (4) - Pidget (1972), Conor Pass (1973), Oscar Schindler (1996, 1997)
- Tattersalls Gold Cup - (1) - Rebelline (2002)
- Pretty Polly Stakes - (3) - Pidget (1972), Polaire (1999). Rebelline (2001)
- Phoenix Stakes - (3) - Sweet Emma (1982), Bradawn Breever (1991), La Collina (2011)
- Matron Stakes - (1) - La Collina (2013)
- Moyglare Stud Stakes - (2) - Miss Beatrix (2006), Termagant (2009)
- National Stakes - (1) - Kingsfort (2009)

(United Kingdom) Great Britain

- 2000 Guineas – (1) – Nebbiolo (1977)
