= Phoenix Stakes =

Flat horse race in Ireland

- Class: Group 1
- Location: Curragh Racecourse; County Kildare, Ireland
- Inaugurated: 1902
- Race type: Flat / Thoroughbred
- Sponsor: Keeneland
- Website: Curragh

Race information
- Distance: 6f (1,207 metres)
- Surface: Turf
- Track: Straight
- Qualification: Two-year-olds excluding geldings
- Weight: 9 st 5 lb Allowances; 3 lb for fillies
- Purse: €400,000 (2026); 1st: €235,600

Phoenix Stakes
2026
Sun Goddess	Folsom Blues	Velozee

Previous years
2025
Power Blue	True Love	Green Sense
2024
Babouche	Whistlejacket	Arizona Blaze
2023
Bucanero Fuerte	Porta Fortuna	Givemethebeatboys
2022
Little Big Bear	Persian Force	Shartash
2021
Ebro River	Dr Zempf	Go Bears Go

2020-2011
2020
Lucky Vega	The Lir Jet	Aloha Star
2019
Siskin	Monarch Of Egypt	Royal Lytham
2018
Advertise	So Perfect	The Irish Rover
2017
Sioux Nation	Beckford	Actress
2016
Caravaggio	Courage Under Fire	Medicine Jack
2015
Air Force Blue	Washington Dc	Buratino
2014
Dick Whittington	Kool Kompany	Cappella Sansevero
2013
Sudirman	Big Time	War Command
2012
Pedro The Great	Leitir Mor	Lottie Dod
2011
La Collina	Power	Tough As Nails

2010-2001
2010
Zoffany	Glor Na Mara	Strong Suit
2009
Alfred Nobel	Air Chief Marshal	Walk on Bye
2008
Mastercraftsman	Art Connoisseur	Bushranger
2007
Saoirse Abu	Henrythenavigator	Elletelle
2006
Holy Roman Emperor	Hellvelyn	Miss Beatrix
2005
George Washington	Amadeus Mozart	Red Clubs
2004
Damson	Oratorio	Russian Blue
2003
One Cool Cat	Old Deuteronomy	Three Valleys
2002
Spartacus	Marino Marini	Polar Force
2001
Johannesburg	Miss Beabea	Agnetha

2000-1991
2000
Minardi	Superstar Leo	Dora Carrington
1999
Fasliyev	Yara	Buffalo Berry
1998
Lavery	Access All Areas	Polaire
1997
Princely Heir	Asfurah	Harbour Master
1996
Mantovani	Muchea	Verglas
1995
Danehill Dancer	Woodborough	Catch A Glimpse
1994
Eva Luna	Sharp Point	Desert Style
1993
Turtle Island	Las Meninas	Fast Eddy
1992
Pips Pride	Shahik	Darbonne
1991
Bradawn Breever	Maledetto	Festive Cheer

1990-1988
1990
Mac's Imp	Distinctly North	Gipsy Fiddler
1989
Pharaoh's Delight	Duck And Dive	Wedding Bouquet
1988
Superpower	Run To Jenny	Chief's Image

The Phoenix Stakes is a Group 1 flat horse race in Ireland open to two-year-old thoroughbred colts and fillies. It is run at the Curragh over a distance of 6 furlongs (1,207 metres), and it is scheduled to take place each year in August.

== History ==
The event was established in 1902, and it was originally held at Phoenix Park. It used to be called the Phoenix Plate, and was informally known as "the 1500". It was initially contested over 5 furlongs.

The race was renamed the Phoenix Stakes in 1956. It was given Group 2 status in 1971, and promoted to Group 1 level in 1979.

The Phoenix Stakes was staged at Leopardstown in 1982. It returned to Phoenix Park with a new distance of 6 furlongs in 1983.

Phoenix Park Racecourse closed in 1990, and the event switched to Leopardstown in 1991. It moved to the Curragh in 2002.

== Records ==
Leading jockey since 1950 (5 wins):

- Michael Kinane – King Persian (1983), Fasliyev (1999), Minardi (2000), Johannesburg (2001), One Cool Cat (2003)

Leading trainer since 1950 (17 wins):

- Aidan O'Brien – Lavery (1998), Fasliyev (1999), Minardi (2000), Johannesburg (2001), Spartacus (2002), One Cool Cat (2003), George Washington (2005), Holy Roman Emperor (2006), Mastercraftsman (2008), Alfred Nobel (2009), Zoffany (2010), Pedro the Great (2012), Dick Whittington (2014), Air Force Blue (2015), Caravaggio (2016), Sioux Nation (2017), Little Big Bear (2022)

Leading owner since 1981 (19 wins): (includes part ownership)

- Sue Magnier – Lavery (1998), Fasliyev (1999), Minardi (2000), Johannesburg (2001), Spartacus (2002), One Cool Cat (2003), Damson (2004), George Washington (2005), Holy Roman Emperor (2006), Mastercraftsman (2008), Alfred Nobel (2009), Zoffany (2010), Pedro the Great (2012), Sudirman (2013), Dick Whittington (2014), Air Force Blue (2015), Caravaggio (2016), Sioux Nation (2017), Little Big Bear (2022)

== Winners since 1979 ==
Year	Winner	Jockey	Trainer	Owner	Time
1979	Smokey Lady	Wally Swinburn	Dermot Weld
1980	Swan Princess	Taffy Thomas	Brian Swift
1981	Achieved	Pat Eddery	Vincent O'Brien	Robert Sangster	0:57.70
1982	Sweet Emma	Gabriel Curran	Kevin Prendergast	Jackie Ward Ramos	1:00.20
1983	King Persian	Michael Kinane	Liam Browne	Seamus McAleer	1:11.70
1984	Aviance	Declan Gillespie	David O'Brien	Robert Sangster	1:08.60
1985	Roaring Riva	Ray Cochrane	Ray Laing	Billy Gaff	1:14.40
1986	Minstrella	John Reid	Charlie Nelson	Ned Evans	1:13.20
1987	Digamist	Pat Eddery	Jeremy Tree	Khalid Abdullah	1:11.40
1988	Superpower	Walter Swinburn	Bill O'Gorman	Mrs Poh-Lian Yong	1:11.95
1989	Pharaoh's Delight	Ray Cochrane	Peter Hudson	Al-Deera Bloodstock Ltd	1:11.60
1990	Mac's Imp	Alan Munro	Bill O'Gorman	Tamdown Ltd	1:09.90
1991	Bradawn Breever	Rodney Griffiths	Kevin Prendergast	M. A. Murray	1:13.30
1992	Pips Pride	Frankie Dettori	Richard Hannon Sr.	Mrs V. S. Grant	1:13.00
1993	Turtle Island	John Reid	Peter Chapple-Hyam	Robert Sangster	1:14.40
1994	Eva Luna	Kevin Manning	Jim Bolger	Catherine Shubotham	1:14.00
1995	Danehill Dancer	Pat Eddery	Neville Callaghan	Michael Tabor	1:14.60
1996	Mantovani	Conor Everard	Jim Bolger	Jackie Bolger	1:13.60
1997	Princely Heir	Jason Weaver	Mark Johnston	Maktoum Al Maktoum	1:11.80
1998	Lavery	Walter Swinburn	Aidan O'Brien	Tabor / Magnier	1:11.10
1999	Fasliyev	Michael Kinane	Aidan O'Brien	Tabor / Magnier	1:17.10
2000	Minardi	Michael Kinane	Aidan O'Brien	Tabor / Magnier	1:12.20
2001	Johannesburg	Michael Kinane	Aidan O'Brien	Tabor / Magnier	1:13.20
2002	Spartacus	Colm O'Donoghue	Aidan O'Brien	Sue Magnier	1:15.10
2003	One Cool Cat	Michael Kinane	Aidan O'Brien	Magnier / Tabor	1:11.40
2004	Damson	Kieren Fallon	David Wachman	Magnier / Tabor	1:13.20
2005	George Washington	Kieren Fallon	Aidan O'Brien	Magnier / Tabor / Smith	1:12.70
2006	Holy Roman Emperor	Kieren Fallon	Aidan O'Brien	Sue Magnier	1:11.00
2007	Saoirse Abu	Kevin Manning	Jim Bolger	Ennistown Stud / Bolger	1:18.89
2008	Mastercraftsman	Johnny Murtagh	Aidan O'Brien	Smith / Magnier / Tabor	1:13.30
2009	Alfred Nobel	Johnny Murtagh	Aidan O'Brien	Smith / Magnier / Tabor	1:20.32
2010	Zoffany	Johnny Murtagh	Aidan O'Brien	Tabor / Smith / Magnier	1:11.29
2011	La Collina	Declan McDonogh	Kevin Prendergast	Joerg Vasicek	1:13.30
2012	Pedro the Great	Seamie Heffernan	Aidan O'Brien	Smith / Magnier / Tabor	1:19.05
2013	Sudirman	Wayne Lordan	David Wachman	Mrs Fitri Hay & Sue Magnier	1:09.35
2014	Dick Whittington	Joseph O'Brien	Aidan O'Brien	Tabor / Smith / Magnier	1:14.55
2015	Air Force Blue	Joseph O'Brien	Aidan O'Brien	Tabor / Smith / Magnier	1:11.88
2016	Caravaggio	Seamie Heffernan	Aidan O'Brien	Tabor / Smith / Magnier	1:11.79
2017	Sioux Nation	Ryan Moore	Aidan O'Brien	Tabor / Smith / Magnier	1:11.72
2018	Advertise	Frankie Dettori	Martyn Meade	Phoenix Thoroughbred Ltd 1	1:12.29
2019	Siskin	Colin Keane	Ger Lyons	Khalid Abdullah	1:17.14
2020	Lucky Vega	Shane Foley	Jessica Harrington	Zhang Yuesheng	1:13.35
2021	Ebro River	Shane Foley	Hugo Palmer	Al Shaqab Racing	1:12.16
2022	Little Big Bear	Ryan Moore	Aidan O'Brien	Tabor / Smith / Magnier / Westerberg	1:11.27
2023	Bucanero Fuerte	Kevin Stott	Adrian Murray	AMO Racing Limited & Giselle De Aguiar	1:12.53
2024	Babouche	Colin Keane	Ger Lyons	Juddmonte	1:09.33
2025	Power Blue	David Egan	Adrian Murray	AMO Racing Limited	1:09.28
2026	Sun Goddess	Ryan Moore	Aidan O'Brien	Smith / Magnier / Tabor / Westerberg	1:09.67

== Earlier winners ==
- 1902: Bushey Belle
- 1903: Cape Solitaire
- 1904: Abelard
- 1905: Athleague
- 1906: Lalla Rookh
- 1907: Americus Girl
- 1908: Glenesky
- 1909: Lady Edgar
- 1910: Clonbern
- 1911: Far and Wide
- 1912: Happy Fanny
- 1913: Courier Belle
- 1914: St Cuimin
- 1915: Vera Cruz
- 1916: The Banshee
- 1917: Bonnie Dance
- 1918: Gilded Vanity
- 1919: Blue Dun
- 1920: Double Tip
- 1921: Bridgemount
- 1922: Rabona
- 1923: Dawson City
- 1924: Pons Asinorum
- 1925: Allets
- 1926: Archway
- 1927: Athford
- 1928: Trigo
- 1929: Confetti
- 1930: Galapas
- 1931: The Greek
- 1932: Cedarhurst
- 1933: His Reverence
- 1934: Smokeless
- 1935: Dancing Comet
- 1936: Phideas
- 1937: Knight's Caprice
- 1938: New Comet
- 1939: Eyrefield
- 1940: Enchantress
- 1941: Fair Crystal
- 1942: The Phoenix
- 1943: Arctic Sun
- 1944: Lady's View
- 1945: Momentum
- 1946: Lady Kells
- 1947: The Web
- 1948: Ballywillwill
- 1949: Abadan
- 1950: Gold Cup
- 1951: Windy City
- 1952: Royal Duchy
- 1953: Sixpence
- 1954: My Beau
- 1955: Sarissa
- 1956: Refined
- 1957: Vestogan
- 1958: Getaway
- 1959: Gigi
- 1960: Kathy Too
- 1961: Prince Poppa
- 1962: Irish Chorus
- 1963: Right Strath
- 1964: Adriatic Star
- 1965: Current Coin *
- 1966: Jadeite
- 1967: Fatima's Gift
- 1968: Lord John
- 1969: Pianissimo
- 1970: Areola
- 1971: Celtic Twilight
- 1972: Marble Arch
- 1973: Noble Mark
- 1974: Lady Seymour
- 1975: National Wish
- 1976: Cloonlara
- 1977: Perla
- 1978: Kilijaro

* Red Taffy finished first in 1965, but he was disqualified.

== See also ==
- Horse racing in Ireland
- List of Irish flat horse races
- Recurring sporting events established in 1902 – this race is included under its original title, Phoenix Plate.
