= Discoveries (horse) =

Irish Thoroughbred racehorse

- Racing silks of Niarchos Family
- Sire: Mastercraftsman
- Grandsire: Danehill Dancer
- Dam: Alpha Lupi
- Damsire: Rahy
- Sex: Mare
- Foaled: 29 April 2019
- Country: Ireland
- Colour: Bay
- Breeder: Niarchos Family
- Owner: Niarchos Family
- Trainer: Jessica Harrington
- Record: 4: 2-0-1
- Earnings: £166,728

Major wins
- Moyglare Stud Stakes (2021)

Discoveries (foaled 29 April 2019) is an Irish Thoroughbred racehorse. She was one of thest two-year-old fillies in Ireland in 2021 when she won two of her four races including the Group 1 Moyglare Stud Stakes.

== Background ==
Discoveries is a bay mare with no white markings bred in Ireland by her owners the Niarchos Family. She was sent into training with Jessica Harrington at Moone, County Kildare.

Her sire Mastercraftsman was a top class performer whose wins included the Phoenix Stakes, National Stakes, Irish 2,000 Guineas and St James's Palace Stakes. As a breeding stallion, his other offspring include Kingston Hill, Amazing Maria and The Grey Gatsby. Her dam Alpha Lupi was unraced, but came from a very successful female bloodline which has been in the ownership of the Niarchos family for several generations: she was a daughter of East of the Moon who was in turn a daughter of Miesque. Alpha Lupi had previously produced Alpine Star and Alpha Centauri, the latter being a full-sister to Discoveries.

== Racing career ==
=== 2021: two-year-old season ===
Discoveries was ridden in all of her races as a two-year-old by Shane Foley. The filly made her debut in a seven furlong maiden race at Leopardstown Racecourse on 3 June when she started at odds of 11/1 and finished fourth behind Juncture, beaten three and three quarter lengths by the winner. Three weeks later she started favourite for a similar event at the Curragh and recorded her first success as she took the lead two furlongs out and held of a late challenge from the Aidan O'Brien trained Tuesday to win by a short head. On 23 August, over the same course and distance, Discoveries started 4/1 co-favourite when she was stepped up in class to contest the Group 2 Debutante Stakes. After being restrained in the early stages she made progress approaching the final furlong but never looked likely to win and came home third behind Agartha and Sunset Shiraz.

Despite her defeat in the Debutante, Discoveries was moved up in class again for the Moyglare Stud Stakes (Ireland's only Group 1 race confined to two-year-old fillies) at the Curragh on 12 September and started at odds of 17/2 in an eight-runner field. The Ger Lyons-trained Cairde Go Deo went off favourite, while the other contenders included Agartha, Sunset Shiraz and Homeless Songs (winner of her only previous start). Discoveries raced in second place behind Agartha before moving up to gain the advantage inside the final furlong and won by three quarters of a length with Sunset Shiraz two lengths back in third. After the race Jessica Harrington commented "She's a lovely filly and completely different to Alpha Centauri. She's not as big as 'Alpha' but has done a lot of growing, has a lovely temperament and isn't as feisty. We'll sit down with the Niarchos Family and have a discussion as to what she'll do next. It's very special to win this." Foley said "I thought I'd get closer to Agartha today sitting closer to her on better ground. There was no hiding place, we were skipping along, but I knew this filly had stepped forward from the Debutante. She's still quite green and had never gone that fast in her life."

== Pedigree ==
Pedigree of Discoveries (IRE), bay filly, 2019
Sire Mastercraftsman (IRE) 2006	Danehill Dancer (IRE); 1993	Danehill (USA)	Danzig
Sire Mastercraftsman (IRE) 2006	Danehill Dancer (IRE); 1993	Danehill (USA)	Razyana
Sire Mastercraftsman (IRE) 2006	Danehill Dancer (IRE); 1993	Mira Adonde (USA)	Sharpen Up (GB)
Sire Mastercraftsman (IRE) 2006	Danehill Dancer (IRE); 1993	Mira Adonde (USA)	Lettre d'Amour
Sire Mastercraftsman (IRE) 2006	Starlight Dreams (USA); 1995	Black Tie Affair (IRE)	Miswaki (USA)
Sire Mastercraftsman (IRE) 2006	Starlight Dreams (USA); 1995	Black Tie Affair (IRE)	Hat Tab Girl (USA)
Sire Mastercraftsman (IRE) 2006	Starlight Dreams (USA); 1995	Reves Celestes	Lyphard
Sire Mastercraftsman (IRE) 2006	Starlight Dreams (USA); 1995	Reves Celestes	Tobira Celeste
Dam Alpha Lupi (IRE) 2004	Rahy (USA); 1985	Blushing Groom (FR)	Red God (USA)
Dam Alpha Lupi (IRE) 2004	Rahy (USA); 1985	Blushing Groom (FR)	Runaway Bride (GB)
Dam Alpha Lupi (IRE) 2004	Rahy (USA); 1985	Glorious Song (CAN)	Halo (USA)
Dam Alpha Lupi (IRE) 2004	Rahy (USA); 1985	Glorious Song (CAN)	Ballade (USA)
Dam Alpha Lupi (IRE) 2004	East of the Moon (USA); 1991	Private Account	Damascus
Dam Alpha Lupi (IRE) 2004	East of the Moon (USA); 1991	Private Account	Numbered Account
Dam Alpha Lupi (IRE) 2004	East of the Moon (USA); 1991	Miesque	Nureyev
Dam Alpha Lupi (IRE) 2004	East of the Moon (USA); 1991	Miesque	Pasadoble (Family: 20)
