= Miss Beatrix =

Irish-bred Thoroughbred racehorse

- Sire: Danehill Dancer
- Grandsire: Danehill
- Dam: Miss Beabea
- Damsire: Catrail
- Sex: Mare
- Foaled: 5 March 2004
- Country: Ireland
- Colour: Bay
- Breeder: Bill Durkan
- Owner: Bill Durkan
- Trainer: Kevin Prendergast
- Record: 9: 3-2-2
- Earnings: £833,653

Major wins
- Moyglare Stud Stakes (2006); Goffs Million (2006)

Miss Beatrix (foaled 5 March 2004) is an Irish Thoroughbred racehorse and broodmare. As a two-year-old in 2006 she was one of the best fillies of her generation in Ireland when she won three of eight races including the Moyglare Stud Stakes and the Goffs Million as well as finishing third in the Phoenix Stakes. She ran unplaced in the 1000 Guineas in the following spring and was retired from racing later that year.

== Background ==
Miss Beatrix is a bay mare bred in Ireland by Bill Durkan. As a yearling in September 2005 she was offered for sale at Goffs and was "bought" for €180,000 by the trainer Kevin Prendergast. Prendergast was in fact acting on behalf of the filly's breeder so that no money actually changed hands. During her racing career she was trained by Prendergast and owned Durkan. She was ridden in all but two of her races by Declan McDonogh.

She was sired by Danehill Dancer, who won the Phoenix Stakes, National Stakes and Greenham Stakes before becoming a very successful breeding stallion. His other progeny have included Choisir, Mastercraftsman, Legatissimo, Lillie Langtry and Dancing Rain. Her dam Miss Beabea was a sprinting mare who won the Blenheim Stakes and finished second to Johannesburg in the Phoenix Stakes. Her dam Lady Ellen was a half-sister to Indian Ridge.

== Racing career ==
=== 2006: two-year-old season ===
On her racecourse debut, Miss Beatrix started 5/2 favourite for a maiden race over five furlongs on heavy ground at the Curragh on 26 March. She finished third behind Drayton and Latin Walk but was later promoted to second after the winner failed a drug test. On 6 June she contested a similar event at Tipperary Racecourse and came home third of the thirteen runners behind City of Tribes and Rabatash. Eight days after her defeat at Tipperary, the filly was stepped up in distance for a maiden over seven furlongs on good to firm ground at Leopardstown Racecourse and started 4/6 favourite against nine opponents. She took the lead two furlongs from the finish and won "easily" by three and a half lengths from Evening Rushour.

Miss Beatrix was stepped up in class and started favourite for the Listed Woodpark & Ballysheehan Studs Stakes at the Curragh on 30 June but made little impact and finished seventh behind the Jim Bolger-trained Gaudeamus. On 19 July the filly produced a much better effort in the Silver Flash Stakes at Leopardstown leading for most of the way before being overtaken in the closing stages and finishing second to the favourite Chanting. Miss Beatrix was then stepped up to Group 1 class and started a 50/1 outsider in a seven-runner field for the Phoenix Stakes over six furlongs at the Curragh on 13 August. Ridden by Willie Supple she belied her odds as she finished strongly to take third place behind Holy Roman Emperor and the Coventry Stakes winner Hellvelyn. Supple was again in the saddle when the filly returned to the Curragh for the Moyglare Stud Stakes two weeks later. The form of her run in the Phoenix Stakes had been boosted earlier that afternoon when the sixth-placed Rabatash won the Group 3 Round Tower Stakes. The Dermot Weld-trained Supposition started favourite ahead of Simply Perfect while Miss Beatrix was made a 14/1 outsider. The other nine runners included Gaudeamus, Brazilian Bride (Fillies' Sprint Stakes) and Alexander Tango. After being held up at the rear of the field Miss Beatrix made rapid progress in the last quarter mile and took the lead in the final strides to win by a short head from the British challenger Silca Chieve. Kevin Prendergast said "She should have been second in the Phoenix Stakes, but she didn't follow the leader through, so when I saw the sixth win the Group 3 here today, I thought she must have a big chance". Supple commented "The boss has done a wonderful job. She settled much better today and I always felt we'd get there".

On 19 September Miss Beatrix was one of 28 juveniles to contest the Goffs Million, a race restricted to horses sold at the Goffs sales, which carried a first prize of €985,000, making it the most valuable race for two-year-olds in Europe. She started the 6/1 second favourite behind Fly Free in a field which also included Finsceal Beo, Drumfire (Solario Stakes) and He's A Decoy (Rochestown Stakes). The field split into two separate groups on either side of the course with Mis Beatrix racing towards the rear of those on the far side (the right hand side from the jockeys viewpoint) before making a forward move two furlongs out. She took the lead approaching the final furlong, opened up a clear lead and won "comfortably" by one and a quarter lengths from Regime, with Drumfire taking third ahead of Emerald Hill. Prendergast said I thought she might have improved from the Moyglare, but it's dangerous to think like that at this time of year. Only the man above knows the score. Anything this filly achieves next year will be a bonus, but she has taken her racing well and she will be aimed at the Guineas".

=== 2007: three-year-old season ===
Miss Beatrix made her first and only appearance of 2007 in the 194th running of the 1000 Guineas over the Rowley Mile at Newmarket Racecourse on 6 May. She started the 12/1 fifth choice in the betting but was ever in serious contention and finished 18th of the 21 runners, twenty-five lengths behind the winner Finsceal Beo. Prendergast reported that the filly came out of race "very flat and very sick" and despite hopes that she would return later in the year for a sprint campaign she never raced again.

== Breeding record ==
At the end of her racing career, Miss Beatrix was retired to become a broodmare for her owner's stud. She has produced eight foals and two winners:

- Oh So Lucy, a bay filly, foaled in 2009, sired by Galileo. Failed to win in seven races.
- Korantam, bay colt, 2010, by Galileo. Unraced.
- Jally, chestnut colt (later gelded), 2011, by Tamayuz. Won three races.
- Tamga, bay colt, 2012, by Azamour. Unraced.
- Oromo, bay colt (gelded), 2013, by High Chaparral. Failed to win in fifteen races.
- Mighty Shulammite, bay filly, 2014, by Acclamation
- Arbalet, grey colt, 2015, by Dark Angel. Won one race.
- Unnamed bay colt, 2017, by Muhaarar.

== Pedigree ==
Pedigree of Miss Beatrix (IRE), bay mare, 2004
Sire Danehill Dancer (IRE) 1993	Danehill (USA); 1986	Danzig	Northern Dancer
Sire Danehill Dancer (IRE) 1993	Danehill (USA); 1986	Danzig	Pas de Nom
Sire Danehill Dancer (IRE) 1993	Danehill (USA); 1986	Razyana	His Majesty
Sire Danehill Dancer (IRE) 1993	Danehill (USA); 1986	Razyana	Spring Adieu
Sire Danehill Dancer (IRE) 1993	Mira Adonde (USA); 1986	Sharpen Up	Atan
Sire Danehill Dancer (IRE) 1993	Mira Adonde (USA); 1986	Sharpen Up	Rocchetta
Sire Danehill Dancer (IRE) 1993	Mira Adonde (USA); 1986	Lettre D'Amour	Caro
Sire Danehill Dancer (IRE) 1993	Mira Adonde (USA); 1986	Lettre D'Amour	Lianga
Dam Miss Beabea (IRE) 1999	Catrail (USA); 1990	Storm Cat	Storm Bird
Dam Miss Beabea (IRE) 1999	Catrail (USA); 1990	Storm Cat	Terlingua
Dam Miss Beabea (IRE) 1999	Catrail (USA); 1990	Tough As Nails	Majestic Light
Dam Miss Beabea (IRE) 1999	Catrail (USA); 1990	Tough As Nails	Hardliner
Dam Miss Beabea (IRE) 1999	Lady Ellen (IRE); 1987	Horage	Tumble Wind
Dam Miss Beabea (IRE) 1999	Lady Ellen (IRE); 1987	Horage	Musicienne
Dam Miss Beabea (IRE) 1999	Lady Ellen (IRE); 1987	Hillbrow	Swing Easy
Dam Miss Beabea (IRE) 1999	Lady Ellen (IRE); 1987	Hillbrow	Golden City (Family 3-e)
