= 2007 1000 Guineas =

194th 1000 Guineas Stakes
- 1000 Guineas
- Location: Newmarket Racecourse
- Date: 6 May 2007
- Winning horse: Finsceal Beo (IRE)
- Jockey: Kevin Manning
- Trainer: Jim Bolger (IRE)
- Owner: Michael Ryan

The 2007 1000 Guineas Stakes was a horse race held at Newmarket Racecourse on Sunday 6 May 2007. It was the 194th running of the 1000 Guineas.

The winner was Michael Ryan's Finsceal Beo, a chestnut filly trained by Jim Bolger at Coolcullen in County Carlow and ridden by Kevin Manning. Finsceal Beo's victory was the first in the race for her owner, trainer and jockey.

== The contenders ==
The race attracted an unusually large field of twenty-one runners, seventeen trained in the United Kingdom, three in Ireland and one in Sweden. The favourite was the Jim Bolger-trained Finsceal Beo who had been named European Champion Two-year old Filly in 2006 when she had won the Rockfel Stakes in England and the Prix Marcel Boussac in France. The other Irish runners were Arch Swing the winner of the C. L. Weld Park Stakes and the Leopardstown 1,000 Guineas Trial Stakes, the Moyglare Stud Stakes winner Miss Beatrix, and the Aidan O'Brien-trained Theann. The best of the British-trained runners appeared to be the Cheveley Park Stakes winner Indian Ink and Simply Perfect, the winner of the May Hill Stakes and the Fillies' Mile and Scarlet Runner (Princess Margaret Stakes, Nell Gwyn Stakes). Finsceal Beo headed the betting at odds of 5/4 ahead of Indian Ink (17/2), Simply Perfect (9/1) and Arch Swing (10/1).

== The race ==
Shortly after the start, the fillies split into two groups across the wide Newmarket straight, with the larger group racing up the stands side (the left of the course from the jockeys' viewpoint), with the smaller group running down the centre of the course. The 150/1 outsider Fantasy Parkes headed the stands side group from Scarlet Runner, Finsceal Beo and Treat, whilst the 250/1 shot Princess Valerina led the centre group from Arch Swing. The two groups merged after half a mile, by which point Scarlet Runner had taken the overall lead. A quarter of a mile from the finish, Scarlet Runner began to struggle and was overtaken by Finsceal Beo and Arch Swing, with Simply Perfect and Indian Ink making progress. In the closing stages, Finsceal Beo went clear and stayed on well to win by two and a half lengths from Arch Swing, with Simply Perfect one and a quarter lengths back in third. Treat finished fourth ahead of Indian Ink, who had failed to obtain a clear run a furlong from the finish.

Finsceal Beo's winning time was an "outstanding" 1:34.94. Her owner, Michael Ryan said "That was fantastic. We have a super filly and a super trainer. We'll drink every pub dry of Guinness between here and Stansted Airport tonight!"

== Race details ==
- Sponsor: Stan James
- First prize: £198,730
- Surface: Turf
- Going: Good to Firm
- Distance: 8 furlongs
- Number of runners: 21
- Winner's time: 1:34.94

== Full result ==
Pos.	Marg.	Horse (bred)	Jockey	Trainer (Country)	Odds
1		Finsceal Beo (IRE)	Kevin Manning	Jim Bolger (IRE)	5/4 fav
2	2½	Arch Swing (USA)	Mick Kinane	John Oxx (IRE)	10/1
3	1¼	Simply Perfect (GB)	Johnny Murtagh	Jeremy Noseda (GB)	9/1
4	1½	Treat (GB)	Jamie Spencer	Mick Channon (GB)	14/1
5	nk	Indian Ink (IRE)	Richard Hughes	Richard Hannon (GB)	17/2
6	1	Yaqeen (GB)	Richard Hills	Michael Jarvis (GB)	12/1
7	½	Scarlet Runner (GB)	Kerrin McEvoy	John Dunlop (GB)	14/1
8	1	Puggy (IRE)	Stéphane Pasquier	Roy Arne Kvisla (SWE)	150/1
9	¾	Satulagi (USA)	Stevie Donohoe	J. S. Moore (GB)	200/1
10	1	Theann (GB)	Christophe Soumillon	Aidan O'Brien (IRE)	20/1
11	1¾	Cartimandua (GB)	Jimmy Fortune	Ed McMahon (GB)	200/1
12	3½	Sweet Lilly (GB)	Darryll Holland	Mick Channon (GB)	33/1
13	2½	Vital Statistics (GB)	Kevin Darley	David Elsworth (GB)	100/1
14	2½	Princess Valerina (GB)	Michael Hills	Barry Hills (GB)	250/1
15	1½	Barshiba (IRE)	J. F. Egan	David Elsworth (GB)	40/1
16	nk	Darrfonah (IRE)	Christophe Lemaire	Clive Brittain (GB)	100/1
17	2½	Fantasy Parkes (GB)	Neil Callan	Kevin Ryan (GB)	150/1
18	½	Miss Beatrix (IRE)	Declan McDonogh	Kevin Prendergast (IRE)	12/1
19	2½	Kaseema (USA)	Martin Dwyer	Michael Stoute (GB)	20/1
20	nk	Blue Rocket (IRE)	Olivier Peslier	Tim Pitt (GB)	33/1
21	1¼	Selinka (GB)	Eddie Ahern	Richard Hannon (GB)	100/1

- Abbreviations: nse = nose; nk = neck; shd = head; hd = head; dist = distance; UR = unseated rider; DSQ = disqualified; PU = pulled up

== Winner's details ==
Further details of the winner, Finsceal Beo

- Foaled: 19 February 2004
- Country: Ireland
- Sire: Mr Greeley; Dam: Musical Treat (Royal Academy)
- Owner: Michael Ryan
- Breeder: Rathberry Stud
