= Alpine Star (horse) =

Irish-bred Thoroughbred racehorse

- Racing silks of Niarchos Family
- Sire: Sea The Moon
- Grandsire: Sea The Stars
- Dam: Alpha Lupi
- Damsire: Rahy
- Sex: Mare
- Foaled: 24 March 2017
- Country: Ireland
- Colour: Chestnut
- Breeder: Niarchos family
- Owner: Niarchos family
- Trainer: Jessica Harrington
- Record: 7: 3-3-1
- Earnings: £511,803

Major wins
- Debutante Stakes (2019); Coronation Stakes (2020)

Alpine Star (foaled 24 March 2017) is an Irish Thoroughbred racehorse. She showed very good form as a juvenile in 2019, winning two of her three races including the Debutante Stakes. On her first run of 2020 she won the Coronation Stakes.

== Background ==
Alpine Star is a chestnut mare with no white markings bred in Ireland by the Niarchos family. She was sent into training with Jessica Harrington at Moone, in County Kildare.

She was from the second crop of foals sired by the 2014 German Horse of the Year Sea The Moon, who won four of his five races before his racing career was ended by injury. Alpine Star's dam Alpha Lupi was unraced but came from a very successful female bloodline which has been in the ownership of the Niarchos family for several generations: she was a daughter of East of the Moon who was in turn a daughter of Miesque. In 2015 she produced Alpha Centauri, by Mastercraftsman.

== Racing career ==
=== 2019: two-year-old season ===
Alpine Star was ridden in all of her races as a two-year-old by Shane Foley. On her track debut she started at odds of 7/2 for a maiden race over seven furlongs at Leopardstown Racecourse on 11 July and finished third of the seven runners behind Love and Soul Search under a gentle ride from Foley. On 2 August the filly started 7/4 favourite for a similar event over the same distance at Galway and won "comfortably" by three and a quarter lengths from the Aidan O'Brien-trained Santiago after taking the lead a furlong from the finish.

Three weeks after her win at Galway Alpine Star was stepped up in class to contest the Group 2 Debutante Stakes at the Curragh and started the 2/1 second choice in the betting behind Love in a nine-runner field which also included Soul Search. After tracking the leaders, Alpine Star made steady progress in the last quarter mile and overhauled Love in the final strides to win by a short head. After the race Harrington said "She’s tough, isn’t she. She’s all heart and stays really well. Shane said they went hard the whole way and she got a little bit lost in the middle of the race, but when she got upsides all she wanted to do was stick her head out. She's tough and needs a mile." The filly was expected to end her season with a trip to France for the Group 1 Prix Marcel Boussac at Longchamp Racecourse in October but was pulled out of the race after sustaining a muscle injury.

In the official rating of Irish two-year-olds for 2019 Alpine Star was rated the fifth-best juvenile filly of the year behind Millisle, Albigna, Love and Cayenne Pepper.

=== 2020: three-year-old season ===
The flat racing season in England and Ireland was disrupted by the COVID-19 pandemic and Alpine Star did not make her reappearance until 20 June when she was sent to England to contest the Coronation Stakes over one mile at Royal Ascot. Ridden by Frankie Dettori she started the 9/2 third favourite behind Quadrilateral and the Breeders' Cup Juvenile Fillies Turf winner Sharing in a seven-runner field which also included Run Wild (Pretty Polly Stakes), Cloak of Spirits (second in the 1000 Guineas), So Wonderful (third in the Irish 1,000 Guineas) and Love Locket (Leopardstown Fillies Trial Stakes). After settling behind the leading group as Run Wild set the pace, Alpine Star took the lead approaching the final furlong and drew away in the closing stages to win "comfortably" by four and a half lengths from Sharing. Jessica Harrington commented "I'm very lucky to have fillies like that. I couldn't believe how good she was. I actually have no idea what the plan will be. I need to talk to the owners and Frankie, and then we'll make the decision" while Dettori, who was winning the race for the first time said "I've never been able to be on the right horse in this race. Alpine Star was beautifully prepared by Jessica and I'm thrilled... She'd definitely get a mile and a quarter, she did her best work at the end but I don't know about a mile and a half... she's a good filly and won in good style".

On 5 July Alpine Star was sent to France to contest the Prix de Diane over 2000 metres at Chantilly Racecourse in which she was ridden by Stéphane Pasquier and went off the 2.1/1 favourite in an eleven-runner field. She led for most of the way before being overtaken by Fancy Blue 200 metres from the finish and despite rallying strongly in the closing stages she was beaten a short neck into second place. The filly was then matched against older horses and male opposition in the Prix Jacques le Marois over 1600 metres at Deauville Racecourse in August. With Pasquier again in the saddle she was in the first three throughout the race and finished three quarters of a length second to the British-trained colt Palace Pier with a gap of five lengths back to Circus Maximus in third place. Alpine Star was then stepped up in distance for the Prix de l'Opera over 2100 metres at Longchamp Racecourse in which she started favourite but was beaten a short neck into second place by Tarnawa after being overtaken 50 metres from the finish with Audarya and Tawkeel in third and fourth.

In the 2020 World's Best Racehorse Rankings, Alpine Star was rated on 119, making her the equal 57th best racehorse in the world.

== Pedigree ==
Pedigree of Alpine Star (IRE), chestnut filly, 2017
Sire Sea The Moon (GER) 2011	Sea The Stars (IRE); 2006	Cape Cross	Green Desert (USA)
Sire Sea The Moon (GER) 2011	Sea The Stars (IRE); 2006	Cape Cross	Park Appeal
Sire Sea The Moon (GER) 2011	Sea The Stars (IRE); 2006	Urban Sea (USA)	Miswaki
Sire Sea The Moon (GER) 2011	Sea The Stars (IRE); 2006	Urban Sea (USA)	Allegretta (GB)
Sire Sea The Moon (GER) 2011	Sanwa (GER); 2004	Monsun	Königsstuhl
Sire Sea The Moon (GER) 2011	Sanwa (GER); 2004	Monsun	Mosella
Sire Sea The Moon (GER) 2011	Sanwa (GER); 2004	Sacarina (GB)	Old Vic
Sire Sea The Moon (GER) 2011	Sanwa (GER); 2004	Sacarina (GB)	Brave Lass
Dam Alpha Lupi (IRE) 2004	Rahy (USA); 1985	Blushing Groom (FR)	Red God (USA)
Dam Alpha Lupi (IRE) 2004	Rahy (USA); 1985	Blushing Groom (FR)	Runaway Bride (GB)
Dam Alpha Lupi (IRE) 2004	Rahy (USA); 1985	Glorious Song (CAN)	Halo (USA)
Dam Alpha Lupi (IRE) 2004	Rahy (USA); 1985	Glorious Song (CAN)	Ballade (USA)
Dam Alpha Lupi (IRE) 2004	East of the Moon (USA); 1991	Private Account	Damascus
Dam Alpha Lupi (IRE) 2004	East of the Moon (USA); 1991	Private Account	Numbered Account
Dam Alpha Lupi (IRE) 2004	East of the Moon (USA); 1991	Miesque	Nureyev
Dam Alpha Lupi (IRE) 2004	East of the Moon (USA); 1991	Miesque	Pasadoble (Family: 20)
