= Esoterique =

Irish-bred Thoroughbred racehorse

- Racing silks of Édouard de Rothschild
- Sire: Danehill Dancer
- Grandsire: Danehill
- Dam: Dievotchka
- Damsire: Dancing Brave
- Sex: Mare
- Foaled: 4 April 2010
- Country: Ireland
- Colour: Bay
- Breeder: Ecurie de Meautry
- Owner: Édouard de Rothschild
- Trainer: André Fabre
- Record: 20: 6-4-1
- Earnings: £1,093,659

Major wins
- Prix Vanteaux (2013); Dahlia Stakes (2014); Prix Rothschild (2014); Prix Jacques Le Marois (2015); Sun Chariot Stakes (2015)

Esoterique (foaled 4 April 2010) is an Irish-bred, French-trained Thoroughbred racehorse. As a three-year-old she won the Prix Vanteaux and finished second in the Poule d'Essai des Pouliches but then missed the second half of the season. At four she won the Dahlia Stakes in England and the Group One Prix Rothschild in France and in 2015 she added further Group One victories in the Prix Jacques Le Marois and the Sun Chariot Stakes.

== Background ==
Esoterique is a bay mare with a small white star and a white sock on her left hind leg bred in Ireland by her owner Édouard de Rothschild's Ecurie de Meautry. Édouard de Rothschild sent the filly into training with André Fabre at Chantilly.

She was sired by Danehill Dancer, who won the Phoenix Stakes, National Stakes and Greenham Stakes before becoming a very successful breeding stallion. His other progeny have included Choisir, Mastercraftsman and Dancing Rain. Esoterique's dam, Dievotchka, was an unraced daughter of Dancing Brave and a descendant of the influential broodmare Queen of Light. Dievotchka had produced several other winners including the Group Two winners Russian Hope (Grand Prix de Deauville), Russian Cross (Prix Guillaume d'Ornano), and Archange d'Or (Prix Eugène Adam).

== Racing career ==
=== 2013: three-year-old season ===
Esoterique was unraced as a juvenile and began her racing career with a win in a maiden race over 1600 metres at Saint-Cloud Racecourse on 9 April. Less than three weeks later at Longchamp Racecourse she was stepped up in class and started 13/8 favourite for the Group Three Prix Vanteaux over 1850 metres. Ridden as in all of her early races by Maxime Guyon, she took the lead 200 metres from the finish and won by one and a half lengths from Silasol. The runner-up had won the Group One Prix Marcel Boussac on her previous start. On 8 May at the same course Esoterique was made 2/1 favourite in a twenty-runner field for the Group One Poule d'Essai des Pouliches. She took the lead in the last 200 metres but was caught in the final strides and beaten a neck by the Breeders' Cup Juvenile Fillies Turf winner Flotilla. She was then stepped up in distance for the Prix de Diane at Chantilly in June but failed to show her best form, finishing seventh behind Treve.

=== 2014: four-year-old season ===
Esoterique was the beaten favourite in her first two races of 2014. She finished fourth in the Listed Prix Altipan at Saint-Cloud in March and fourth again in the Prix Edmond Blanc at the same course in April. She was then sent to England for the Dahlia Stakes over nine furlongs at Newmarket Racecourse on 4 May. She was made the 9/4 second favourite behind Integral, a British filly who had won the Atalanta Stakes and finished second in the Sun Chariot Stakes in 2013. Esoterique tracked the leaders before accelerating into the lead a furlong out and got the better of a sustained "duel" with Integral to win by a head, with the pair finishing more than three lengths clear of the other five runners. She returned to England in June for the Duke of Cambridge Stakes at Royal Ascot, but tired badly in the closing stages and finished unplaced behind Integral.

On her return to France, Esoterique started the 12/1 outsider in a four-runner field in the Group One Prix Rothschild over 1600 metres at Deauville Racecourse on 3 August. The race is named after Edouard de Rothschild's father Guy de Rothschild. With Guyon taking the mount on the Fabre stable's more fancied runner Miss France, the ride on Esoterique was taken by Pierre-Charles Boudot. The other two runners were Integral, who was made the odds-on favourite, and L'Amour de Ma Vie the winner of the Group Two Balanchine in Dubai. Esoterique raced down the centre of the course before tracking across to the far side before half way. She was still last of the four runners 200 metres from the finish but finished strongly, took the lead in closing stages and won by three quarters of a length from Miss France, with Integral in third.

In September she was matched against colts in the Prix du Moulin at Longchamp and finished fourth behind Charm Spirit, Toronado and Night of Thunder, beaten less than one and a half lengths by the winner. On her final appearance of the season met Integral again when the pair started co-favourites alongside Miss France and the Prix de Sandringham winner Fintry in the Sun Chariot Stkes at Newmarket on 4 October. She reached fourth place a furlong out but could make no further progress and finished in the same position, two and three quarter lengths behind Integral.

=== 2015: five-year-old season ===
Boudot took over from Guyon as Esoterique's regular jockey in 2015. The mare began her season in the Prix du Muguet at Saint-Cloud on 1 May and finished third of the eight runners behind Bawina. In June she was sent for the second time to Royal Ascot and started a 16/1 outsider in a much-anticipated race for the Queen Anne Stakes which attracted eight runners including Solow, Able Friend, Night of Thunder and Toormore. She was not among the early leaders but made steady progress in the last quarter mile to finish second, a length behind Solow. At Deauville in August, the mare was dropped back in distance to take on specialist sprinters in the Prix Maurice de Gheest over 1300 metres. She was restrained by Boudot in the early stages before finishing strongly to take second place, beaten half a length by the three-year-old colt Muhaarar.

A week after her defeat in the Prix Maurice de Gheest, Esoterique ran for the second time in the Prix Jacques Le Marois and started the 5.5/1 third favourite behind Territories (Prix Jean Prat) and Toormore. The other seven runners, in a race run on very soft ground included the Breeders' Cup Mile winner Karakontie and Belardo, the top-rated European two-year-old of 2014. After racing towards the rear of the field she began to make progress 400 metres from the finish. She took the lead 200 metres out, broke clear of her rivals and won by one and a half lengths from Territories, with the German-trained Wild Chief taking third. After the race Rothschild said "The plan was to treat last week like exercise and she never showed any signs of having a race afterwards. André Fabre had her in super shape but we were very worried about the ground. In the end her quality spoke and she won well. She is an extremely consistent filly... She has an immense turn of foot and she has is really showing her quality now."

On 4 October Esoterique returned to England and faced her old rival Integral in the Sun Chariot Stakes. The other runners were Bawina, Fadhayyil (City of York Stakes), Maimara (Prix de Lieurey), Realtra (Sceptre Stakes), Mlabar (Thoroughbred Stakes), Raydara (Debutante Stakes) and Irish Rookie (runner-up in the Poule d'Essai des Pouliches). After tracking the leaders Esoterique moved up to challenge Integral inside the final furlong. Despite Boudot dropping his whip in the closing stages, Esoterique prevailed to win by half a length with Irish Rookie taking third ahead of Fadhayyil. Fabre commented "She has had a remarkable season and it was a very solid performance. She looked a bit workmanlike but she did it very easily at the end and Integral is a very good mare."

On her final start of the season, Esoterique was sent to the United States to contest the Breeders' Cup Mile at Keeneland on 31 October. She was restrained in the early stages in a slowly-run race and although she made some late progress she never looked likely to win and finished seventh of the twelve runners behind Tepin.

=== 2016: six-year-old season ===
Esoterique began hew 2016 in the Pris du Palais Royal at Deauville on 4 June: she started odds-on favourite but was beaten two lengths into second place by the three-year-old colt Attendu. In June she made her second bid for the Queen Anne Stakes but was never in contention and finished unplaced behind Tepin.

== Pedigree ==
Pedigree of Esoterique (IRE), bay mare, 2010
Sire Danehill Dancer (IRE) 1993	Danehill (USA); 1986	Danzig	Northern Dancer
Sire Danehill Dancer (IRE) 1993	Danehill (USA); 1986	Danzig	Pas de Nom
Sire Danehill Dancer (IRE) 1993	Danehill (USA); 1986	Razvana	His Majesty
Sire Danehill Dancer (IRE) 1993	Danehill (USA); 1986	Razvana	Spring Adieu
Sire Danehill Dancer (IRE) 1993	Mira Adonde (USA); 1986	Sharpen Up	Atan
Sire Danehill Dancer (IRE) 1993	Mira Adonde (USA); 1986	Sharpen Up	Rocchetta
Sire Danehill Dancer (IRE) 1993	Mira Adonde (USA); 1986	Lettre D'Amour	Caro
Sire Danehill Dancer (IRE) 1993	Mira Adonde (USA); 1986	Lettre D'Amour	Lianga
Dam Dievotchka (GB) 1989	Dancing Brave (USA); 1983	Lyphard	Northern Dancer
Dam Dievotchka (GB) 1989	Dancing Brave (USA); 1983	Lyphard	Goofed
Dam Dievotchka (GB) 1989	Dancing Brave (USA); 1983	Navajo Princess	Drone
Dam Dievotchka (GB) 1989	Dancing Brave (USA); 1983	Navajo Princess	Olmec
Dam Dievotchka (GB) 1989	High and Dry (GB); 1983	High Line	High Hat
Dam Dievotchka (GB) 1989	High and Dry (GB); 1983	High Line	Time Call
Dam Dievotchka (GB) 1989	High and Dry (GB); 1983	Photo Flash	Match
Dam Dievotchka (GB) 1989	High and Dry (GB); 1983	Photo Flash	Picture Light (Family 1-s)

- Esoterique is inbred 4 × 4 to Northern Dancer, meaning that the stallion appears twice in the fourth generation of her pedigree.
