= Goffs Million =

Horse race in Ireland

- Class: Sales
- Location: Curragh Racecourse; County Kildare, Ireland
- Inaugurated: 2006
- Race type: Flat / Thoroughbred
- Website: Curragh

Race information
- Distance: 6f (1,207 metres); 7f (1,408 metres); 8f (1,609 metres)
- Surface: Turf
- Qualification: Two-year-olds
- Weight: 9 st 3 lb Allowances; 5 lb for fillies
- Purse: €1,234,000 (2022); 1st: €611,000

The Goffs Million is a flat horse race in Ireland open to two-year-old thoroughbreds. It is run at the Curragh and scheduled to take place each year in September. Originally, the Goffs Million was a race series run between 2006 and 2009. It was reintroduced in 2022 as a single race to promote the following week's sales.

== History ==
The race is funded by Goffs, a leading Irish bloodstock auctioneer and was reserved for horses catalogued as yearlings in the previous year's Goffs Million Sale.

The first running was in 2006, when the Goffs Million was a single race contested over 7 furlongs (1,408 metres).

The event was split into two separate divisions in 2007. The divisions initially comprised the Goffs Fillies Million for fillies, and the Goffs (C & G) Million for colts and geldings.

A new format was introduced in 2009, when the divisions were the Goffs Million Sprint (over 6 furlongs), and the Goffs Million Mile (over 8 furlongs). The races were discontinued in 2010.

The race was reintroduced in 2022 and was restricted to horses in the catalogue at the 2021 Goffs Orby Sale.

== Records ==
Leading jockey (2 wins):

- Richard Hughes – Soul City (2008), Lucky General (2009)

Leading trainer (3 wins):

- Richard Hannon Sr. – Minor Vamp (2008), Soul City (2008), Lucky General (2009)

== Winners ==
Year	Winner	Jockey	Trainer	Time
2006	Miss Beatrix	Declan McDonogh	Kevin Prendergast	1:29.40
2007 Fillies	Lush Lashes	Kevin Manning	Jim Bolger	1:24.32
2007 C&G	Luck Money	Richard Quinn	Paul Cole	1:23.32
2008 Fillies	Minor Vamp	Michael Kinane	Richard Hannon Sr.	1:27.22
2008 C&G	Soul City	Richard Hughes	Richard Hannon Sr.	1:27.15
2009 Sprint	Lucky General	Richard Hughes	Richard Hannon Sr.	1:12.31
2009 Mile	Shakespearean	Joe Fanning	Mark Johnston	1:38.92
2022	Galeron	Shane Foley	Charlie Hills	1:26.30
2023	One Look	Billy Lee	Paddy Twomey	1:29.42
2024	Apples And Bananas	Dylan Browne McMonagle	Joseph O'Brien	1:26.19
2025	Dorset	Jack Cleary	Aidan O'Brien	1:28.91
2026	Trean	Billy Lee	Paddy Twomey	1:28.64

== See also ==
- Horse racing in Ireland
- List of Irish flat horse races
