= East of the Moon =

American-bred French Thoroughbred racehorse

- Sire: Private Account
- Grandsire: Damascus
- Dam: Miesque
- Damsire: Nureyev
- Sex: Filly
- Foaled: March 25, 1991
- Country: United States
- Colour: Dark Bay
- Breeder: Flaxman Holdings Ltd.
- Owner: Stavros Niarchos
- Trainer: François Boutin
- Record: 8: 4-2-0
- Earnings: US$790,844 (equivalent)

Major wins
- Prix Jacques Le Marois (1994); Poule d'Essai des Pouliches (1994); Prix de Diane (1994)

Awards
- French Champion Three-Year-Old Miler (1994)

East of the Moon (March 25, 1991 – 2006) was a French Thoroughbred racehorse. She was bred in the United States by Flaxman Holdings Ltd., the breeding arm of the racing stables of shipping magnate Stavros Niarchos. She was sired by multiple American Grade 1 winner Private Account, a son of U.S. Racing Hall of Fame inductee, Damascus. Her dam was Niarchos's French star and U.S. Racing Hall of Fame inductee, Miesque who twice won the Breeders' Cup Mile.

Trained by François Boutin, in 1994 East of the Moon won three Group One races: the Prix Jacques Le Marois, Poule d'Essai des Pouliches and the most prestigious race for Three-Year-Old fillies, the Classic Prix de Diane. She was third in both the Prix de la Grotte and the Prix du Moulin de Longchamp. Her performances earned her Champion Three-Year-Old Miler honors in France.

Retired to Stavros Niarchos's Oak Tree Farm near Lexington, Kentucky, East of the Moon had the first of her nine foals in 1996, none of which were able to match her success on the track – however, her daughter Alpha Lupi is the dam of three Group One winners in Alpha Centauri, Alpine Star and Discoveries.

East of the Moon died at Oak Tree Farm in 2006 after being struck by lightning.

Stud Record

- 2000 CANDA (USA) : Bay filly by Storm Cat (USA) – dam of winners
- 2004 Alpha Lupi (IRE) : Bay filly by Rahy (USA) – the dam of Alpha Centauri, Alpine Star and Discoveries
