= Hormusjee Naorojee Mody =

Indian-born Hong Kong businessman (1838–1911)

Sir Hormusjee Naorojee Mody 麼地
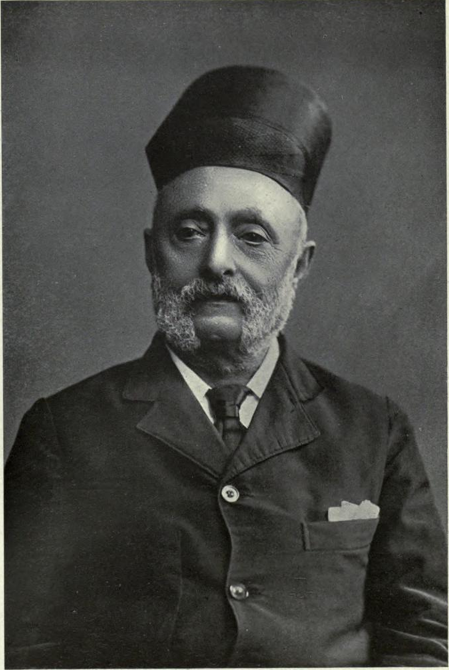
- Born: 12 October 1838; Bombay, British Raj
- Died: 16 June 1911 (aged 72); Hong Kong
- Occupation: Businessman
- Known for: Contribution towards the founding of the University of Hong Kong & Kowloon Cricket Club
- Spouse: Maneckbai Mody

Sir Hormusjee Naorojee Mody (12 October 1838 – 16 June 1911) was an Indian Parsi businessman in Hong Kong. He lived in Hong Kong for 50 years, during which he did much for the benefit of the colony and founded the University of Hong Kong.

== Biography ==
He was born in Bombay and moved to Hong Kong around 1860. At the time there was a large community of Parsi merchants based in Hong Kong, including Dorabjee Naorojee Mithaiwala, who founded the Star Ferry and Jehangir Hormujee Ruttonjee who helped establish the Hong Kong Ruttonjee Sanatorium.

Mody arrived in Hong Kong in 1858 with help from his uncle Jehangirjee Buxey. He spent his early days in the colony as an auctioneer of opium, then a legally respectable activity.

After working at Bank of Hindustan, China and Japan and later Buxey and Company, Mody partnered with another Indian immigrant, Sir Catchick Paul Chater, to form the brokerage company Chater and Mody which enjoyed great success in the real estate/land business. Mody saw the potential of buying and developing land in Kowloon after it was ceded to the British in 1860. Both partners also participated in the great Praya Reclamation Scheme of 1887.

Mody contributed towards the founding of University of Hong Kong, Hong Kong Jockey Club and Kowloon Cricket Club.

== Family ==
Sir Hormusjee Mody and his wife Maneckbai had five children, four sons and a daughter.

- Sirinbai Mody married Nusseranji Dady, and they had a son Hormusjee.
- Merwanjee Mody 1858–1910
- Naoroz Hormusjee Naoroji Mody 1875–1944
- Jehangirjee Hormusjee Mody 1876–1949
- Dinshawjee Hormusjee Mody 1882–1920

== Contribution towards the founding of the University of Hong Kong ==
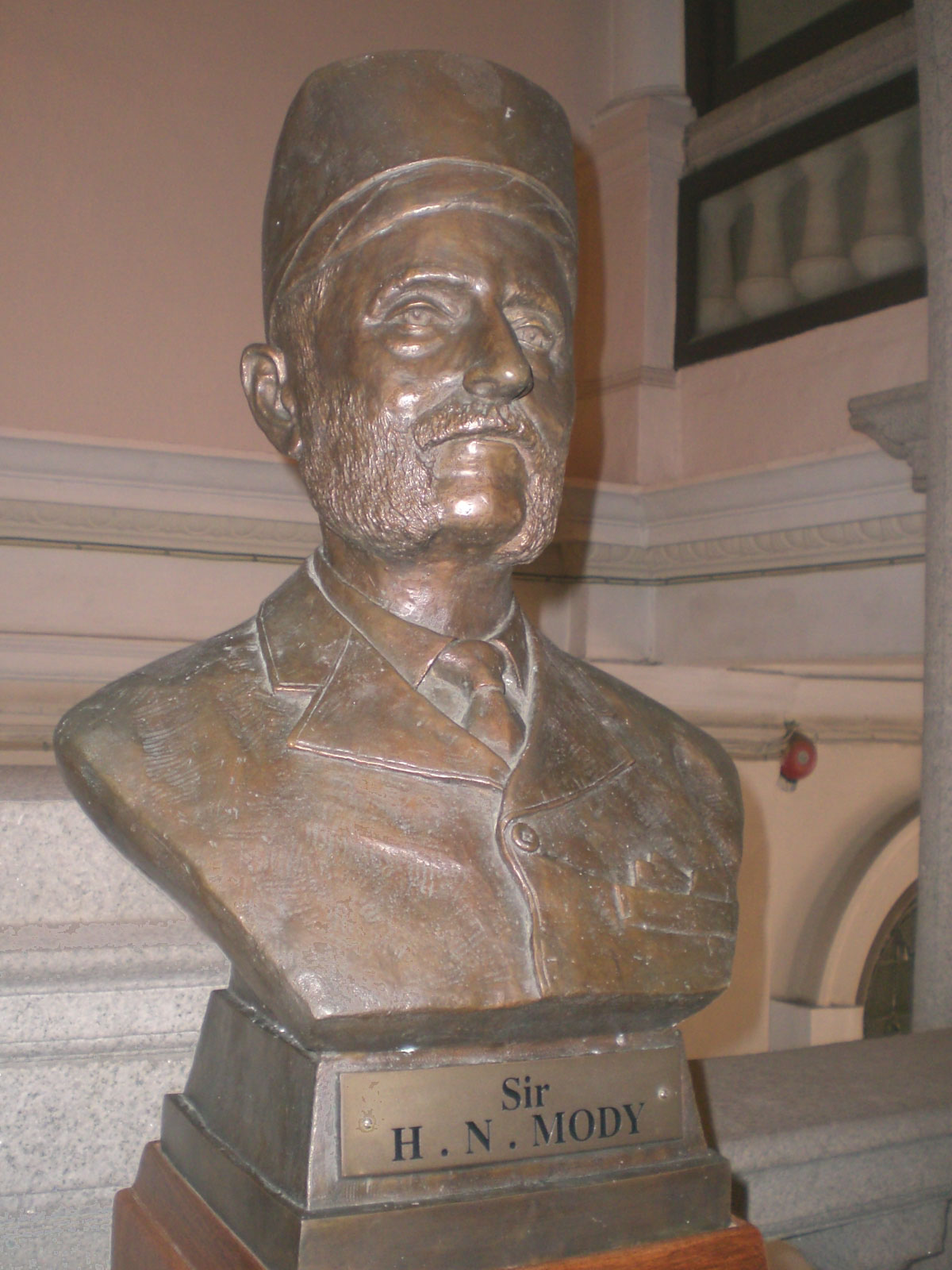
A bust of Sir Mody in the University of Hong Kong

Mody was a friend of the Hong Kong Governor, Sir Frederick Lugard and his wife Flora Shaw, who wished to found a university in Hong Kong. Mody offered to contribute a great sum of money, $150,000, to help establish the University of Hong Kong, provided it was matched with donations from other sources. Eventually, his donation almost doubled to $285,000, which was a very significant component of the total endowment from the inception of this institution.

At the foundation ceremony on 16 March 1910, Mody summed up his reasons for contributing towards HKU:

As a young man, the advantages of education were unfortunately not within my reach, and I have today at my advanced age to confess myself 'no scholar'. Throughout my long life, I have daily realised all I have missed for want of a sound education, and it was with the idea of in some measure providing for others what I was myself denied that I determined to offer to erect at my own cost a building which should bring within their reach those educational advantages which I have myself so greatly missed.

Hong Kong Telegraph 17 March 1910 rightly summed up this event taking a queue from the speech of Viceroy of Canton during the ceremony: "They Built Better Than They Knew".

Sadly, Sir H.N. Mody did not survive long enough to see the opening of the university. The University was officially opened on 11 March 1912. Sir Hormusjee Mody’s son Naoroz Hormusjee Naoroji Mody attended the opening ceremony and said:

Your Excellency [Lord Lugard], it is with feelings of the utmost pleasure and pride that I proceed to perform the duty which devolves upon me of formally in the name of my late father, presenting this University building, to the community, and requesting that you, Sir, may be pleased to declare the same open, and, on behalf of my mother, I also desire to express her regret that, through ill health, she is unable to be present this day... I desire to express to your Excellency the satisfaction which my mother and family feel on this auspicious occasion when the work so nobly undertaken by your Excellency and my father, is about to be brought to so successful and fitting a conclusion... I would add that had my father been spared to see this day his heart would have rejoiced at this realisation of his hopes. I may further state that I have given instructions for the making of a silver model of the Main Building of the University which, when complete, I would ask your Excellency to accept as a souvenir of this opening ceremony, which is, I think a memorable one in the annals of the Colony.

== Awards and titles ==
- Knighted on 16 March 1910 post his speech during the foundation ceremony of HKU. It was announced by Sir Frederick Lugard. “His Majesty has been pleased to approve that Mr. Mody be appointed Knight Bachelor. Letters Patent will be issued in due course. I concur with your proposal to announce the honour at the laying of the foundation stone of the University. A simultaneous announcement will be made in the United Kingdom.”
- Legion of Honour bestowed by the French government.
- Nicknamed 'the Napoleon of the Rialto' for becoming the director of many companies.
- Winner of 11 Hong Kong Derby's and 1 Shanghai Derby. He raced under the name of "Mr Buxey" and his colours were "Blue and white stripes".

== Commemoration ==
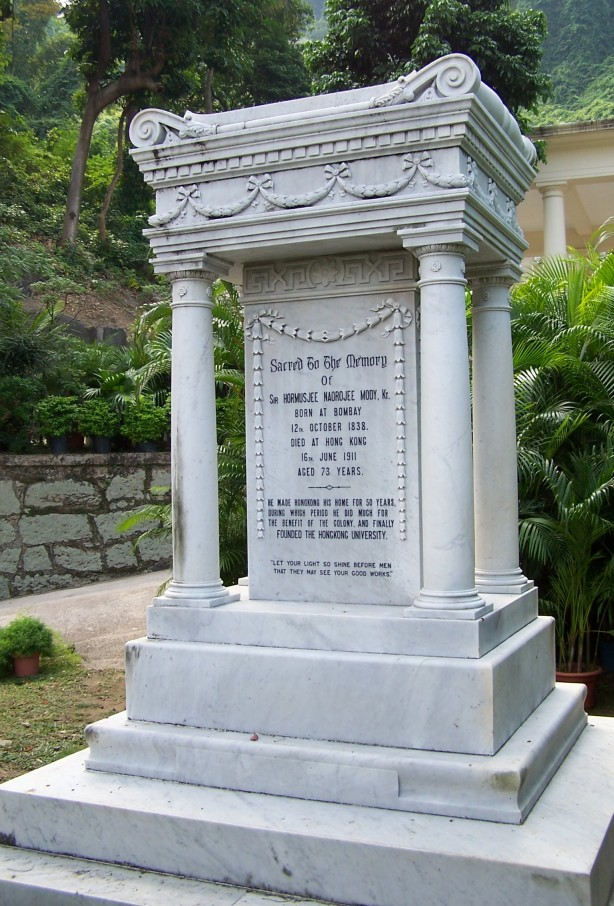
Grave of Hormusjee Mody

Several places in Hong Kong are named after him: Mody Road and Mody Square in Tsim Sha Tsui.

Mody died at his residence, Buxey Lodge, Conduit Road, Hong Kong in 1911 and is buried in the Hong Kong Parsee Cemetery in Happy Valley.

A bronze bust of Sir Hormusjee N. Mody was presented by the Incorporated Trustees of the Zoroastrian Charity Funds of Hong Kong, Canton and Macao to commemorate the 90th Anniversary of the University. It resides on the main staircase of the main building.

Every year on Founder's Day, the Parsi community of Hong Kong visits Hong Kong University along with university students and officials to remember him. A small prayer is said by a Parsi Zoroastrian priest in front of a bust of Sir Hormusjee N. Mody.

Every year, the Mody Handicap race is run in his honour by the Hong Kong Jockey Club.
