= Super Satin =

Hong Kong Thoroughbred racehorse

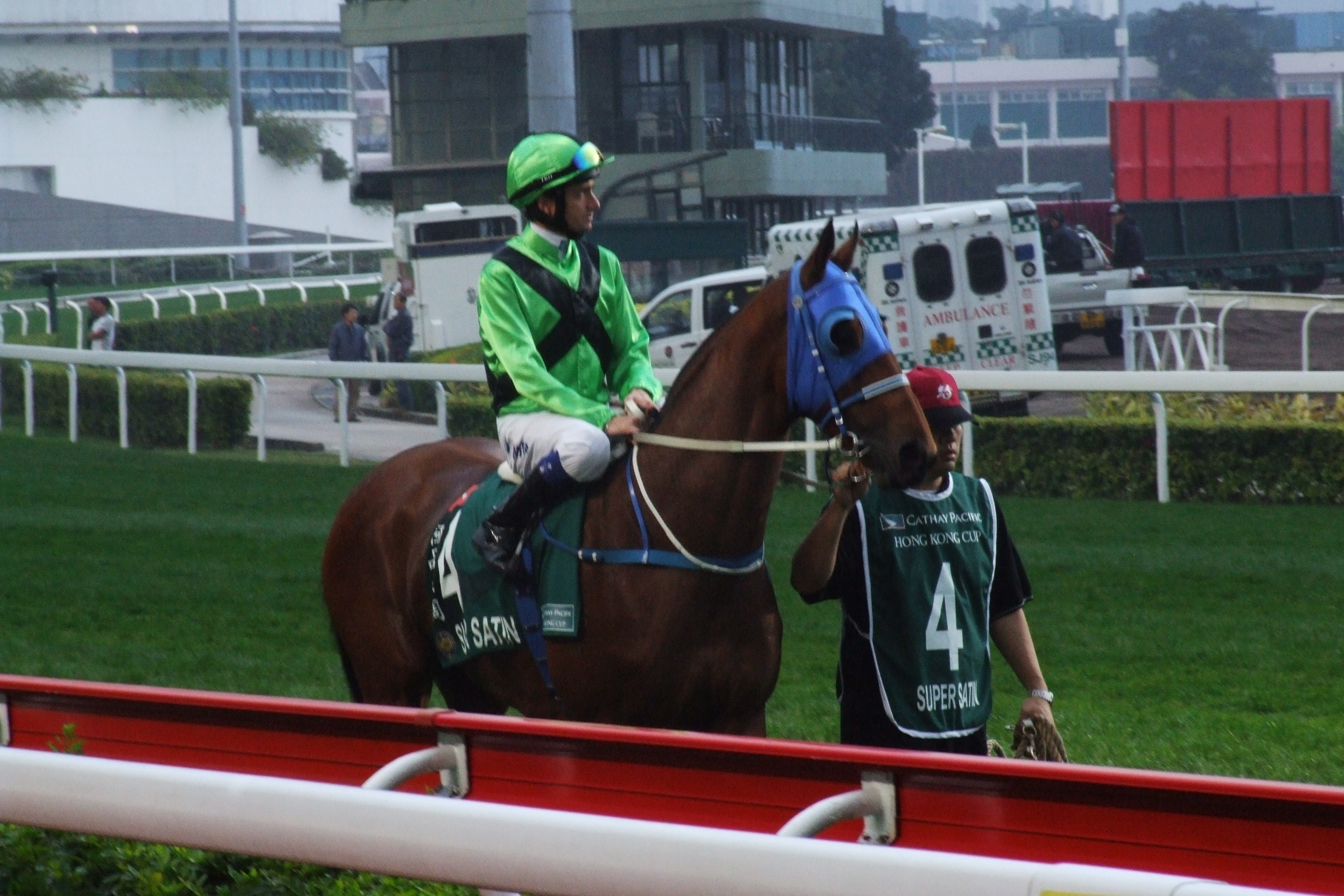
- Sire: Danehill Dancer
- Grandsire: Danehill
- Dam: Mantles Princess
- Damsire: Rock City
- Sex: Gelding
- Foaled: 6 September 2005
- Country: New Zealand
- Colour: Bay
- Breeder: G. Harvey
- Owner: Ranjan Tikam Mahtani
- Trainer: Caspar Fownes
- Record: 29: 5–2–1
- Earnings: HK$14,789,750

Major wins
- Hong Kong Derby (2010)

Super Satin (Chinese: 極品絲綢) is a New Zealand-born and Hong Kong-based Thoroughbred racehorse. In the 2009–2010 season, he won the Hong Kong Derby. He was also one of the nominees for Hong Kong Horse of the Year.
