= Lush Lashes =

British-bred Thoroughbred racehorse

- Sire: Galileo
- Grandsire: Sadler's Well
- Dam: Dance For Fun
- Damsire: Anabaa
- Sex: Mare
- Foaled: 2005
- Country: Great Britain
- Colour: Bay
- Breeder: Mrs. A. M. Jenkins
- Owner: Mrs J S Bolger & John Corcoran
- Trainer: Jim Bolger
- Record: 17: 5-2-1
- Earnings: £1,204,226

Major wins
- Goffs Fillies Million (2007); Musidora Stakes (2008); Coronation Stakes (2008); Yorkshire Oaks (2008); Matron Stakes (2008)

Lush Lashes is a thoroughbred filly that won the Coronation Stakes at Royal Ascot and the Musidora Stakes in York in 2008. She is owned and trained by Jim Bolger and was sired by Galileo out of Dance For Fun.
