= Hong Kong Derby =

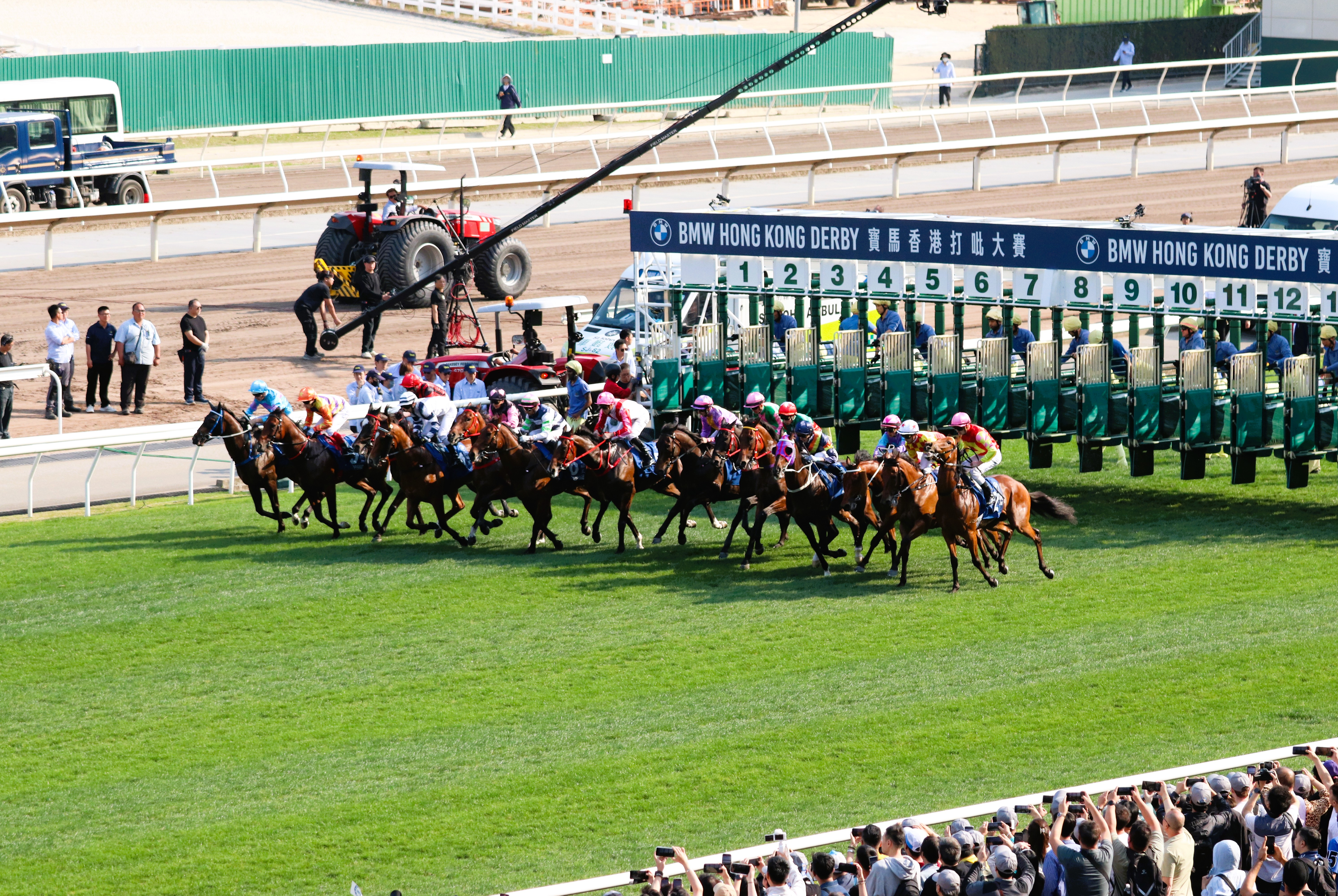
- The start of the 2025 Hong Kong Derby
- Class: Group One (domestic)
- Location: Sha Tin Racecourse; Hong Kong
- Inaugurated: 1873
- Race type: Thoroughbred
- Website: Hong Kong Derby

Race information
- Distance: 2000m (10 furlongs)
- Surface: Turf
- Track: Right-handed
- Qualification: Four-years-old only
- Weight: Colt/Gelding: 126 lbs (57.2 kg); Filly: 122 lbs. (55.3 kg)
- Purse: HK$24 million

The Hong Kong Derby is a Hong Kong Thoroughbred horse race held annually since 1873. Restricted to horses four-years-old only since 1981, the race is run in mid-March and is the premier event on the domestic racing programme with a purse of HK$18 million (app. US$2.3 million). This is the last race in the Hong Kong Four-Year-Old Classic Series.

The first Hong Kong Derby was raced at Happy Valley Racecourse but in 1979 was transferred permanently to its present location at Sha Tin Racecourse.

Since 1981, the Derby has been won by several horses who went on to earn Hong Kong Horse of the Year honors including Football, Co-Tack, Yuno When and River Verdon. In 2003, Elegant Fashion became the first filly to win the Derby since 1976.

From 2004 to 2012, the race was sponsored by Mercedes-Benz. It has been sponsored by BMW since 2013, and since then the Hong Kong actor and martial artist Donnie Yen has been appointed as the "BMW Hong Kong Derby Ambassador" for promoting the event and presenting the awards to the winning units.

== Race distance ==
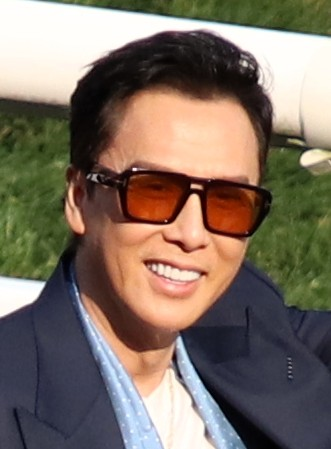
Donnie Yen attending the Hong Kong Derby 2025 race day as the "BMW Hong Kong Derby Ambassador" on 23 March 2025

The racing distance of the Hong Kong Derby has varied over the years. From 2000 to present, the distance has been 2000 metres, with the starting point in front of the Sha Tin grandstand. From 1977 to 1999, the race was held over 1800m. From 1973 to 1976, the distance was 2230m. From 1967 to 1972, the distance was "From The Two Mile Post Once Round & In" (1 mile 171 yards.) From 1963 to 1966, the distance was 1 1/4-mile. In 1961 & 1962, the distance was "From the Half Mile Post Once Round & In" (1 mile 3 furlongs 65 yards.) From 1947 to 1960, the distance was One and a Half mile**.

== Past winners ==
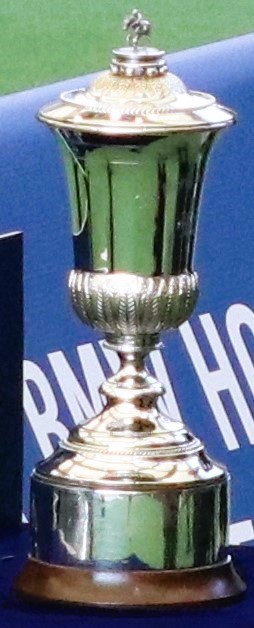
Trophy of the Hong Kong Derby

Year	Winner	Jockey	Trainer	Owner	Time
2026	Invincible Ibis	Hugh Bowman	Mark Newnham	Ibis Syndicate	1:59.43
2025	Cap Ferrat	Craig Williams	Francis Lui Kin-wai	Lo Ki Yan Karen	2:00.67
2024	Massive Sovereign	Zac Purton	Dennis Yip Chor-hong	Chan Kam Hung	1:59.85
2023	Voyage Bubble	Alexis Badel	Ricky Yiu Poon-fai	Sunshine And Moonlight Syndicate	2:02.78
2022	Romantic Warrior	Karis Teetan	Danny Shum Chap-shing	Peter Lau Pak Fai	2:00.23
2021	Sky Darci	João Moreira	Caspar Fownes	Jessica Kwan Mun Hang	2:01.32
2020	Golden Sixty †	Vincent Ho Chak-yiu	Francis Lui Kin-wai	Stanley Chan Ka Leung	2:00.15
2019	Furore	Hugh Bowman	Frankie Lor Fu-chuen	Lee Sheung Chau	2:01.30
2018	Ping Hai Star	Ryan Moore	John Size	Zeng Shengli	2:01.18
2017	Rapper Dragon †	João Moreira	John Moore	Albert Hung Chao Hong	2:02.88
2016	Werther	Hugh Bowman	John Moore	Johnson Chen	2:01.76
2015	Luger	Zac Purton	John Size	Terry Fok Kwong Hang	2:01.28
2014	Designs On Rome	Tommy Berry	John Moore	Cheng Keung Fai	2:02.04
2013	Akeed Mofeed *	Douglas Whyte	Richard Gibson	Pan Sutong	2:01.84
2012	Fay Fay	Douglas Whyte	John Size	Alexander Wong	2:04.41
2011	Ambitious Dragon	Maxime Guyon	Anthony T. Millard	Lam Pui Hung	2:01.50
2010	Super Satin	Douglas Whyte	Caspar Fownes	Ranjan Tikam Mahtani	2:03.59
2009	Collection	Darren Beadman	John Moore	07/08 John Moore Trainer Syndicate	2:02.50
2008	Helene Mascot	Felix Coetzee	Tony Cruz	Dawson Woo Ka Chung, Wilson Woo Ka Wah et al.	2:01.3
2007	Vital King	Brett Prebble	Paul O'Sullivan	Chong Man-lung	2:02.9
2006	Viva Pataca	Christophe Soumillon	John Moore	Stanley Ho Hung-Sun	2:04.6
2005	Vengeance of Rain	Anthony Delpech	David E. Ferraris	Chow Nam & Raymond Gianco Chow Hon Man	2:04.3
2004	Lucky Owners *	Felix Coetzee	Tony Cruz	Leung Kai Fai	2:02.6
2003	Elegant Fashion ‡	Gerald Mosse	David A. Hayes	Gene Tsoi Wai-wang	2:03.6
2002	Olympic Express	Weichong Marwing	Ivan Allan	Larry Yung Chi Kin	2:05.1
2001	Industrial Pioneer	Gerald Mosse	Brian Kan Ping-chee	Albert Hu Si Nok et al.	2:03.1
2000	Keen Winner	Robbie Fradd	Anthony T. Millard	Victor Lui Ting et al.	2:03.3
1999	Holy Grail	David Harrison	Ivan Allan	Mr & Mrs Michael C. Kwee	1:47.1
1998	Johan Cruyff *	Éric Legrix	Patrick L. Biancone	Thomas Liang Ting Sen	1:47.7
1997	Oriental Express	Basil Marcus	Ivan Allan	Larry Yung Chi Kin	1:47.6
1996	Che Sara Sara	Michael Kinane	David Oughton	Paul Kan Man-Lok	1:49.3
1995	Makarpura Star	Tony Cruz	John Moore	Frank Wong Wing-Pak	1:49.5
1994	Super Fit	Gerald Mosse	Lawrie Fownes	Stanley Ho Sau Nan et al.	1:49.5
1993	Helene Star	Éric Legrix	Patrick L. Biancone	Mr & Mrs Woo Po Shing et al.	1:48.0
1992	Sound Print	Michael Kinane	Brian Kan Ping-chee	Edmund Tam Wing Fan	1:48.4
1991	River Verdon	John Matthias	David Hill	Sir Oswald Cheung & The Hon Ronald Arculli	1:48.1
1990	Reliable Source	Maurice Philipperon	Peter Ng Bik Kuen	Charles Lui Chi Keung	1:53.2
1989	William's Coach	Bart Leisher	Brian Kan Ping-chee	Ma Hay Yan	1:47.7
1988	Clear City	Tony Cruz	Chu Po-ming	Leung Chiu-Lun & Ng Tse-Choy	1:48.2
1987	Tea For Two II	Tony Cruz	Ng Chi-lam	Lee Shing Fat	1:49.1
1986	Yuno When	Paul Cheng Chung-mou	Brian Kan Ping-chee	D. C. da Silva	1:49.2
1985	Superior Gold	Brian Rouse	Brian Kan Ping-chee	Joseph Lo Sze Kuen	1:50.1
1984	Baby Tiger	Philippe Paquet	Derek Cheng Tai-chee	Shih Yeh-Ming	1:51.0
1983	Co-Tack	Tony Cruz	Wong Tang-ping	Tsui Tack Kong & Tsui Tack Suen	1:54.0
1982	Football	Joe Mercer	Derek Cheng Tai-chee	Lau Yiu Chu	1:49.8
1981	Flash of Gold	Gary Moore	George Moore	Colin Chan Ken Pin	1:47.6
1980	Excalibur	Gary Moore	George Moore	Li & Fenton	1:47.9
1979	Great Success	David Brosnan	George Sofronoff	Leung Sik Wah	1:47.5
1978	Top Gain	Peter Miers	Tam Man Kui	Kaichu Jay	1:53.3
1977	Grand Duke	Pat Eddery	Chu Po-ming	Lee Pak Huen	1:50.8
1976	Corvette ‡	Philippe Paquet	P. Supple	John Joseph Swaine	2:24.6
1975	Breathing Exercise	Pat Eddery	J. H. Brown	John C.P. Koo	2:24.1
1974	Throgmorton	Derek Cheng Tai-chee	N. Metrevelli	Wayfoong	2:21.4
1973	Kentucky Lad	G. Cadwaladr	J. H. Brown	T. C. Yuen	2:24.3
1972	Vivacious	Derek Cheng Tai-chee	George Sofronoff	Chan Wai Kam	1:50.3
1971	Gwynt-Teq	G. B. Collopy	D. Belov	R. Beynon	1:52.1
1970	Mount Superior	A. J. Silva	Lee Tin Lam	Dr. & Mrs. Yen Ching Lan	1:50.4
1969	Paddy	G. H. Williams	Tam Man Kui	D. Benson	1:51
1968	Excel	T. J. Hore	Lee Tin Lam	RV Louey & LE Louey	1:51.4
1967	Ascot	Alex Lam	Chong Hok Man	Ng Chung Kwan	1:51.3
1966	Tender Heart	T. Lam	Nick Metrevelli	Dr. R. A. Perry	2:14
1965	Lakh Mark	J. M. da Cruz	Nick Metrevelli	Kwong Wing Kam	2:10.4
1964	Czarina	Albert Lam	Cheung Hok Man	Chiu Keung Wu	2:09.4
1963	Big Game	G. H. William	M. Pereboeff	Lai Im Tong	2:06.2
1962	Liar Dice	R. Tsai	Lee Tim Lam	PVCE Libenschutz	
1961	Walbrook	R. Tsai	Nick Metrevelli	Wayfoong	
1960	Virtuous	T.H.Yau	Nick Metrevelli	Leung Tak Wa	
1959	Fascination	M. Samarcq	Wong Siu Hung	F K Pattinson & Hui Sai Fun	
1958	Genghis Khan	A. Lam	M. Pereboeff	Li Che Ho	
1957	Serbu	K. Kwok	E.K. Tokmakoff	Dr Leung Tin Sun & Partners	
1956	Balkan Monarch	Chun Kit	Nick Metrevelli	O.R. Sadrick	
1949	Golden Dahlia	Shieh	Lai Loi Fook	Kwan Fan-Fat & Partners	2:43**
1948	Ataman	E.A. Brodie	N. Tiukavkin	Grebro	
1947	Norse Queen	A. Ostroumoff		R. Johannessen	
1946	Race did not take place due to the Japanese occupation of Hong Kong				
1945	Race did not take place due to the Japanese occupation of Hong Kong				
1944	Race did not take place due to the Japanese occupation of Hong Kong				
1943	Race did not take place due to the Japanese occupation of Hong Kong				
1942	Race did not take place due to the Japanese occupation of Hong Kong				
1941	Oolong	V.V. Needa		TKL	
1940	Satinlight	R.B. Moller	G. Sofronoff	Cire	
1939	Rose Elect	C. Encarnacao		Eu Tong Sen	
1938	Silkylight	R.B. Moller		Cire	
1937	Happy Eve	V.V. Needa		Eve	
1936	Honeymoon Eve	V.V. Needa		Eve	
1935	Herod	W.H.S Davis		Hem	
1934	Hydroplane	B.A. Proulx		Plane	
1933	Trentbridge	V.V. Needa		Mrs Pearce	
1932	Liberty Bay	W. Hill		L. Dunbar	
1931	King's Service	Y.S. Chang		Dynasty	
1930	Diana Bay	W. Hill		L. Dunbar	
1929	President Hall	C. Encarnacao		Ho Kom Tong	
1928	Sitting Bull	H. Maitland		Mrs E.L. Dunbar	
1927	Elliot Bay	Dallas		L. Dunbar	
1926	Glorious Dahlia	McBain		Sir Paul Chater	
1923	Ideal Dahlia	Soares		Sir Paul Chater	
1916	Winsome Dahlia	Burkill		Sir Paul Chater	
1915	Perfection Dahlia	Vida		Sir Paul Chater	
1914	Jewel Aster	Brand		Sir Paul Chater	
1912	White Hawthorn	Burkill		Sir Paul Chater	
1911	Coronation Rose	Burkill		Sir Hormusjee Naorojee Mody	
1910	Royal Rose	Burkill		Sir Hormusjee Naorojee Mody	
1909	Little Gem Rose	Burkill		Sir Hormusjee Naorojee Mody	
1907	Spring Rose	Master		Sir Hormusjee Naorojee Mody	
1906	Triumph Rose	Hayes		Sir Hormusjee Naorojee Mody	
1904	Coronet Rose	W Cox		Sir Hormusjee Naorojee Mody	
1899	Wild Rose	Wuillenmuir		Sir Hormusjee Naorojee Mody	
1895	Black Velvet	Pond		Sir Hormusjee Naorojee Mody	
1889	Pao Shing	Burkill		Sir Hormusjee Naorojee Mody	
1886	Marauder	Pond		Sir Hormusjee Naorojee Mody	
1885	Fun	Pond		Sir Hormusjee Naorojee Mody	
1884	Rappahannock	Pond		Sir Paul Chater	
1878	White Velvet	Lewis		Sir Paul Chater	

† designates a Triple Crown Winner of the Four-Year-Old Classic Series.

‡ designates a filly.

* designates a colt (non-gelding).

== See also ==
- List of Hong Kong horse races
