= Danehill Dancer =

Irish-bred Thoroughbred racehorse

- Racing silks of Michael Tabor
- Sire: Danehill
- Grandsire: Danzig
- Dam: Mira Adonde
- Damsire: Sharpen Up
- Sex: Stallion
- Foaled: 20 January 1993
- Died: 13 March 2017 (aged 24)
- Country: Ireland
- Colour: Bay
- Breeder: L. K. and K. McCreery
- Owner: Michael Tabor
- Trainer: Neville Callaghan
- Jockey: Pat Eddery; Mick Kinane; Richard Hughes; Ray Cochrane
- Record: 11: 4–1–1
- Earnings: £212,559

Major wins
- Phoenix Stakes (1995); National Stakes (1995); Greenham Stakes (1996)

Awards
- Champion 2-year-old colt in Ireland (1995); Champion sire in Great Britain and Ireland (2009)

Danehill Dancer was a bay horse bred by L. K. and K. McCreery and foaled on 20 January 1993. He was sired by Danehill, who won the Haydock Sprint Cup in 1989. Danehill Dancer's dam is Mira Adonde, a daughter of Sharpen Up. Mira Adonde was trained by Alec Stewart, but only raced once, finishing seventh in a seven-furlong maiden race at Newmarket.

Danehill Dancer, who stood 15.3 hands (1.63 m) high, was put up for auction at the Goffs sale in October 1994. He was bought by for 38,000 Irish pounds by the bloodstock agent Dermot "Demi" O'Byrne on behalf of Michael Tabor and put into training with Neville Callaghan at Newmarket.

== Racing career ==
=== 1995: Two-year-old season ===
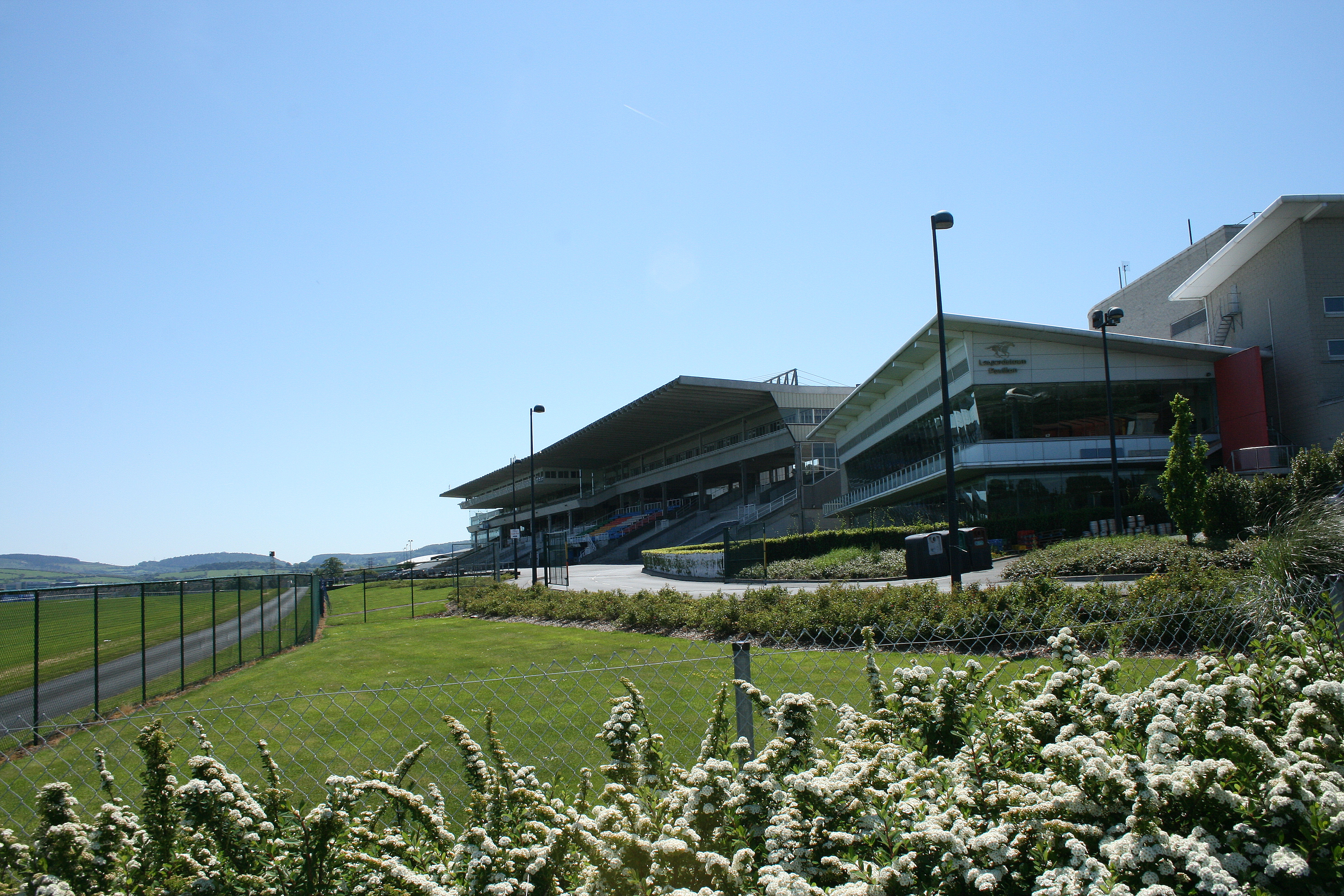
Leopardstown Racecourse, where Danehill Dancer won the Phoenix Stakes

Danehill Dancer made his racecourse debut on 13 July 1995 in a six-furlong maiden race at Newmarket, where he was ridden by Pat Eddery and won the race by one length from Raheen. Danehill Dancer then raced at the top level, when one month later he contested the Group 1 Phoenix Stakes. Ridden again by Eddery, he started as the 2/1 favourite and won the race, beating Woodborough by a neck. After his win in the Phoenix Stakes, Dancehill Dancer started as the odds-on favourite for the National Stakes. Racing over seven furlongs for the first time, Eddery held him up near the rear of the field in the early stages. He drifted right in the penultimate furlong, but as they entered the final furlong he took the lead and ran on to win the race, beating the runner-up Polaris Flight by 1 1/2 lengths. Danehill Dancer's final race of the season came in the Dewhurst Stakes, in a small, but select field. The 4/7 favourite was Alhaarth, who was unbeaten and had won the Champagne Stakes on his previous start. Dancehill Dancer was the 2/1 second favourite, with the Prix Morny winner Tagula at 13/2 and Albaha the 100/1 outsider. Albaha led the field in the early stages, with Danehill Dancer in third place. Alhaarth took the lead three furlongs out and was followed by Danehill Dancer, but Danehill Dancer could not close down the lead of Alhaarth in the final furlong and finished in second place, 2 1/2 lengths behind the winner. At the end of the season, Danehill Dancer was named champion 2-year-old colt in Ireland.

=== 1996: Three-year-old season ===
Danehill Dancer made his first racecourse appearance as a three-year-old on 20 April 1996 in the Greenham Stakes. Starting as the even money favourite, he took the lead of the race with over one furlong still to run and went to win by 1 1/2 lengths from Kahir Almaydan, with Tagula finishing in third place. On 4 May, Danehill Dancer was one of thirteen colts to contest the 2000 Guineas Stakes at Newmarket. Alhaarth started the race as the 2/1 favourite, with Danehill Dancer starting at the price of 10/1. After the start, the field split into two groups, with jockey Mick Kinane positioning Danehill Dancer at the rear of the group racing down the centre of the track. Kinane tried to get Danehill Dancer to close the gap to the leaders over two furlongs out, but he stayed at the same pace, finishing in sixth place, about nine lengths behind winner Mark of Esteem, who beat Even Top and Bijou D'Inde in a close finish. Eight days later, Danehill Dancer finished ninth out of the ten runners in the Poule d'Essai des Poulains. Odds-on favourite Ashkalani won the race, beating Spinning World by half a length.

Danehill Dancer dropped back in distance for the six-furlong July Cup on 11 July. After being behind in the early stages he stayed on to finish in fifth place behind winner Anabaa. Danehill Dancer was an outsider in the betting for the Prix Maurice de Gheest, for which Anabaa started as a short-price favourite. Danehill Dancer was ridden by Ray Cochrane for the only time in his career, who positioned him at the back of the pack. By the time the field reached two furlongs from the finish, Danehill Dancer had made progress and took second place. He could not reach winner Anabaa and lost second place to Miesque's Son near the winning line, finishing in third place. Danehill Dancer's final race of the season was the Haydock Sprint Cup, where he was once again ridden by Pat Eddery. After chasing the leaders in the early stages, he soon lost his position and eventually finished in last place of the eleven runners behind winner Iktamal.

=== 1997: Four-year-old season ===
Danehill Dancer stayed in training as a four-year-old, but his only race of the season came in the Duke of York Stakes on 15 May. After chasing the leaders in the early stages he could not keep pace with them and finished seventh of the ten runners, approximately 4 1/2 lengths behind winner Royal Applause. During his racing career, Danehill Dancer won a total of £212,559 in prize money. He then traveled to Australia to stand as a stallion for Coolmore (which Michael Tabor is involved with) during the 1997 Southern Hemisphere breeding season.

== Race record ==
Date	Race name	Distance (F)	Course	Class	Prize	Odds	Runners	Place	Margin (L)	Winner/Runner-up	Time	Jockey	Ref.
13 July 1995	EBF Maiden Stakes	6	Newmarket	Class 4	£4,980	7/4	7	1	1	Raheen	1:15.90	Pat Eddery	
13 August 1995	Phoenix Stakes	6	Leopardstown	G1	£83,663	2/1	10	1	0.25	Woodborough	1:14.60	Pat Eddery	
16 September 1995	National Stakes	7	Curragh	G1	£58,317	4/5	7	1	1.5	Polaris Flight	1:24.10	Pat Eddery	
13 October 1995	Dewhurst Stakes	7	Newmarket	G1	£82,390	2/1	4	2	2.5	Alhaarth	1:24.64	Pat Eddery	
20 April 1996	Greenham Stakes	7	Newbury	G3	£19,860	Evens	8	1	1.5	Kahir Almaydan	1:30.18	Pat Eddery	
4 May 1996	2000 Guineas Stakes	8	Newmarket	G1	£122,262	10/1	13	6	9.25	Mark of Esteem	1:37.59	Mick Kinane	
12 May 1996	Poule d'Essai des Poulains	8	Longchamp	G1	£131,752	14/1	10	9	8.25	Ashkalani	1:37.60	Richard Hughes	
11 July 1996	July Cup	6	Newmarket	G1	£90,588	7/1	10	5	4.75	Anabaa	1:10.63	Mick Kinane	
11 August 1996	Prix Maurice de Gheest	6.5	Deauville	G1	£65,876	29/1	9	3	1.75	Anabaa	1:19.00	Ray Cochrane	
7 September 1996	Haydock Sprint Cup	6	Haydock Park	G1	£77,249	7/1	11	11	14	Iktamal	1:09.92	Pat Eddery	
15 May 1997	Duke of York Stakes	6	York	G3	£28,400	6/1	10	7	4.75	Royal Applause	1:12.13	Pat Eddery	

Note: F = Furlongs, L = Lengths

== Stud career ==
Danehill Dancer was retired to stand as a stallion at Coolmore Stud in 1997, with his stud fee initially set at Ir£4,000, and he traveled to stand at Coolmore's Australian stud for the Southern Hemisphere breeding season. Danehill Dancer sired three Group 1 winners from his 1999 foals. Danehill Dancer did not produce any horses that scored at the top level for a few seasons until Speciosa in 2003. Danehill Dancer's 2004 crop included five major winners, and his 2005 progeny included three more.

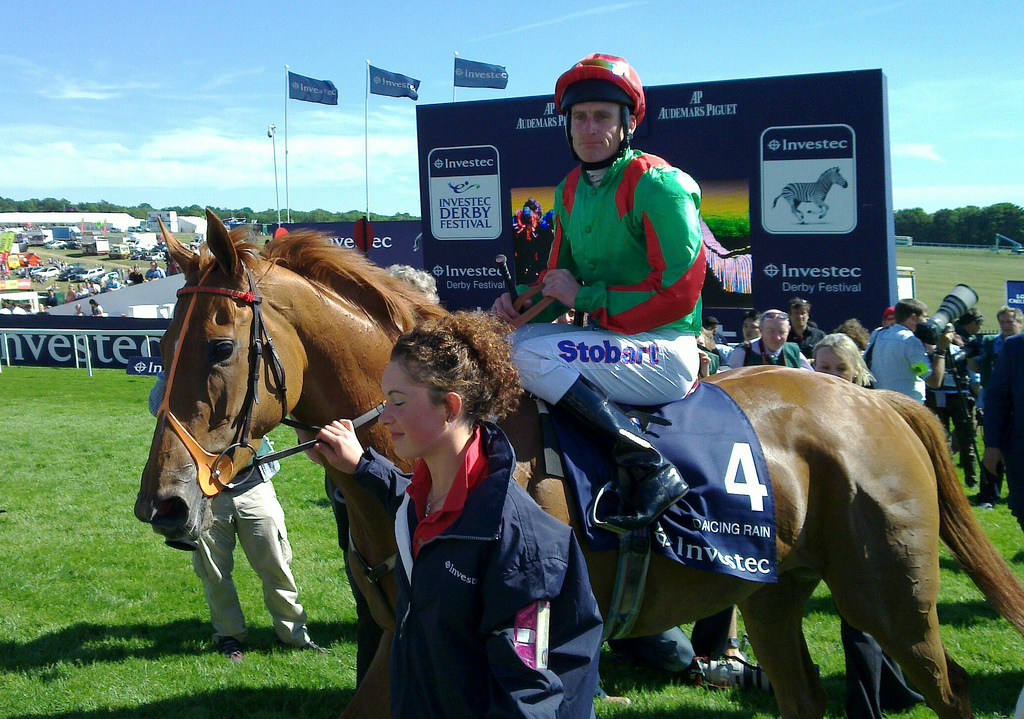
Danehill Dancer's daughter Dancing Rain after winning the Oaks

The stallion's next crop of foals included three more top-class winners including Mastercraftsman who became a very successful breeding stallion. He earned the title of champion sire of Great Britain and Ireland in 2009. In 2007, by which time his fee had risen to €115,000, Danehill Dancer produced another five Group or Grade 1 winners. His 2008 crop included Dancing Rain. In 2010 Danehill Dancer was one of Europe's four most expensive sires. That year he produced three more major winners including Esoterique. His 2012 fee was €60,000 and his 2013 fee was reduced to €40,000.

From 2010, Danehill Dancer's fertility began to decline. He did not get any mares in foal during 2014, and was subsequently retired from stud duty. Following his retirement Christy Grassick, a Coolmore manager, said: "Starting out at a lowly fee he continually upgraded his mares and ultimately became a major force in European and Australian breeding." As well as being champion sire in 2009, Danehill Dancer has also been the leading sire of two-year-olds on three occasions.

As of 28 May 2014, when he was retired from stud duty he had sired 82 Group or Grade race winners.

Danehill Dancer was euthanised in March 2017 at the age of 24 "due to the infirmities of old age".

=== Major winners ===
c = colt, f = filly, g = gelding

Foaled	Name	Sex	Major wins
1999	Choisir	c	Lightning Stakes, King's Stand Stakes, Golden Jubilee Stakes
1999	Where Or When	c	Queen Elizabeth II Stakes
1999	Private Steer	f	Stradbroke Handicap, Doncaster Handicap, All Aged Stakes
2003	Speciosa	f	1000 Guineas
2004	Miss Beatrix	f	Moyglare Stud Stakes
2004	Risky Business	g	Singapore Gold Cup
2004	Light Fantastic	g	Cadbury Guineas
2004	Arapaho Miss	f	Crown Oaks
2004	Alexander Tango	f	Garden City Handicap
2005	Atomic Force	g	The Galaxy, Railway Stakes
2005	Super Satin	g	Hong Kong Derby
2006	Mastercraftsman	c	Phoenix Stakes, National Stakes, Irish 2,000 Guineas, St James's Palace Stakes
2006	Again	f	Moyglare Stud Stakes, Irish 1,000 Guineas
2006	Ave	f	Flower Bowl Invitational Stakes
2007	Lillie Langtry	f	Coronation Stakes, Matron Stakes
2007	Unaccompanied	f	Spring Juvenile Hurdle, Istabraq Festival Hurdle
2007	Alfred Nobel	c	Phoenix Stakes
2007	Planteur	c	Prix Ganay
2007	Steps In Time	c	Coolmore Classic
2008	Dancing Rain	f	Epsom Oaks, Preis der Diana
2010	Esoterique	f	Prix Rothschild, Prix Jacques Le Marois, Sun Chariot Stakes
2010	Hillstar	c	Canadian International Stakes
2010	Here Comes When	g	Sussex Stakes
2012	Legatissimo	f	1000 Guineas, Nassau Stakes, Matron Stakes
2013	Qemah	f	Coronation Stakes, Prix Rothschild

=== Sire of sires ===
At least three of Danehill Dancer's sons have sired Group 1 winners:

- Choisir sired Olympic Glory, The Last Lion, Starspangledbanner Sacred Choice (Doncaster Handicap) and Obviously (Shoemaker Mile Stakes, Breeders' Cup Turf Sprint).
- Mastercraftsman sired Kingston Hill, The Grey Gatsby and Amazing Maria
- Fast Company, sired Jet Setting
- Planteur, sired Trueshan

== Pedigree ==
Pedigree of Danehill Dancer (IRE), bay stallion, 1993
Sire Danehill (USA) b. 1986	Danzig (USA) b. 1977	Northern Dancer b. 1961	Nearctic
Sire Danehill (USA) b. 1986	Danzig (USA) b. 1977	Northern Dancer b. 1961	Natalma*
Sire Danehill (USA) b. 1986	Danzig (USA) b. 1977	Pas de Nom b. 1968	Admiral's Voyage
Sire Danehill (USA) b. 1986	Danzig (USA) b. 1977	Pas de Nom b. 1968	Petitioner
Sire Danehill (USA) b. 1986	Razyana (USA) b. 1981	His Majesty b. 1968	Ribot
Sire Danehill (USA) b. 1986	Razyana (USA) b. 1981	His Majesty b. 1968	Flower Bowl
Sire Danehill (USA) b. 1986	Razyana (USA) b. 1981	Spring Adieu b. 1974	Buckpasser
Sire Danehill (USA) b. 1986	Razyana (USA) b. 1981	Spring Adieu b. 1974	Natalma*
Dam Mira Adonde (USA) b. 1986	Sharpen Up (GB) ch. 1969	Atan ch. 1961	Native Dancer
Dam Mira Adonde (USA) b. 1986	Sharpen Up (GB) ch. 1969	Atan ch. 1961	Mixed Marriage
Dam Mira Adonde (USA) b. 1986	Sharpen Up (GB) ch. 1969	Rocchetta ch. 1961	Rockefella
Dam Mira Adonde (USA) b. 1986	Sharpen Up (GB) ch. 1969	Rocchetta ch. 1961	Chambiges
Dam Mira Adonde (USA) b. 1986	Lettre d'Amour (USA) gr. 1979	Caro gr. 1967	Fortino II
Dam Mira Adonde (USA) b. 1986	Lettre d'Amour (USA) gr. 1979	Caro gr. 1967	Chambord
Dam Mira Adonde (USA) b. 1986	Lettre d'Amour (USA) gr. 1979	Lianga gr. 1971	Dancer's Image
Dam Mira Adonde (USA) b. 1986	Lettre d'Amour (USA) gr. 1979	Lianga gr. 1971	Leven Ones

Note: b. = Bay, ch. = Chestnut, gr. = Grey

* Danehill Dancer is inbred 4×4 to Natalma. This means that the mare appears twice in the fourth generation of his pedigree.
