= Simply Perfect =

British-bred Thoroughbred racehorse

- Sire: Danehill
- Grandsire: Danzig
- Dam: Hotelgenie Dot Com
- Damsire: Selkirk
- Sex: Mare
- Foaled: 14 January 2004
- Country: United Kingdom
- Colour: Grey
- Breeder: Trehedyn Stud and Quarry Bloodstock
- Owner: Derrick Smith, Michael Tabor and Susan Magnier
- Trainer: Jeremy Noseda
- Record: 13: 4–2–3
- Earnings: £386,061

Major wins
- May Hill Stakes (2006); Fillies' Mile (2006); Falmouth Stakes (2007)

Simply Perfect (foaled 14 January 2004) is a retired British Thoroughbred racehorse and broodmare. Between June 2006 and October 2007 she ran thirteen times in four countries and won four races, two of them at Group One level. As a two-year-old she was placed in the Queen Mary Stakes and the Princess Margaret Stakes before showing improved form in autumn to win the May Hill Stakes and the Fillies' Mile. In the following season she finished third in 1000 Guineas and sixth in the Oaks, before recording her biggest success in the Falmouth Stakes. She did not win again and was retired from racing after an erratic and unexplained performance in the Breeders' Cup Filly & Mare Turf.

== Background ==
Simply Perfect is a grey mare with white socks on her hind legs bred by Derek Clee's Trehedyn Stud Her sire Danehill (who died in 2003) was one of the most successful stallions of the last twenty years, producing the winners of more than a thousand races, including one hundred and fifty-six at Group One/Grade I level. Among his best offspring are Duke of Marmalade, Dylan Thomas, Rock of Gibraltar, George Washington and North Light. Simply Perfect's dam, Hotelgenie Dot Com, from whom she inherited her colour, won only one minor race, but finished second in the Moyglare Stud Stakes and third in the Fillies' Mile. She is a descendant of Aurorabella, a half sister to the dam of the 2000 Guineas winner Only for Life.

As a yearling, the filly was consigned from the Catridge Farm Stud to the Tattersalls sales at Newmarket. On 5 October she was bought for 220,000 guineas by the bloodstock agent Dermot "Demi" O'Byrne, acting on behalf of John Magnier's Coolmore organisation. Unlike most Coolmore horses, which are handled by Aidan O'Brien at Ballydoyle, Simply Perfect was sent into training with Jeremy Noseda at Newmarket.

== Racing career ==
=== 2006: two-year-old season ===
Simply Perfect made her racecourse debut on 5 June at Windsor Racecourse when she finished second in a five furlong maiden race to Dutch Art, a colt who went on to win the Prix Morny and the Middle Park Stakes. Sixteen days later she was moved up in class to contest the Group Two Queen Mary Stakes at Royal Ascot and finished second of the fifteen runners behind the Richard Hannon Sr.-trained Gilded. In July, the filly dropped back to maiden company for a race at Lingfield Park Racecourse and recorded her first victory, winning at odds of 2/13. Two weeks later at Ascot, the filly finished third, beaten half a length and a neck by Scarlet Runner and Vital Statistics in the Group Three Princess Margaret Stakes, with the favourite Indian Ink in fourth. On 27 August, Simply Perfect was sent to Ireland and moved up to Group One class for the Moyglare Stud Stakes over seven furlongs at the Curragh. She started the 4/1 second favourite, but finished seventh, after failing to obtain a clear run in the closing stages.

On 9 September, Simply Perfect was moved up in distance for the Group Three May Hill Stakes over one mile at York Racecourse (the race's usual venue, Doncaster Racecourse was closed for redevelopment). Ridden for the first time by Darryll Holland, she was held up towards the back of the eight runner field before making progress in the straight. She overtook the favourite English Ballet 75 yards from the finish and won by a length. Two weeks later, Simply Perfect and English Ballet met again in the Group One Fillies' Mile at Ascot and started at odds of 11/4 and 5/2 respectively. Holland positioned the filly just behind the leaders before moving up to take the lead approaching the final furlong. Simply Perfect hung to the right in the closing stages but won by one and a half lengths from Treat, with English Ballet in third place. After the race, Noseda described Simply Perfect as "a tough, honest filly who was fast enough to finish placed in the Queen Mary, and to be still going forward as she has is a great credit to her."

=== 2007: three-year-old season ===
On her three-year-old debut, Simply Perfect was one of twenty-one fillies to contest the 194th running of the 1000 Guineas over Newmarket's Rowley Mile course on 6 May. She started the 9/1 third favourite in the betting and finished third, beaten two and a half lengths and one and a quarter lengths by Finsceal Beo and Arch Swing. Four weeks later she was moved up in distance for the 229th running of the Oaks Stakes at Epsom Downs Racecourse. Ridden by Johnny Murtagh she was hampered shortly after the start and again just after half way, before finishing sixth of the fourteen runners behind Light Shift.

On 11 July, Simply Perfect started at odds of 6/1 in the Group One Falmouth Stakes at Newmarket. Her opponents included Nannina (Coronation Stakes), Arch Swing, Red Evie (Lockinge Stakes) and the South African mare Iridescence (Queen Elizabeth II Cup). Murtagh adopted new tactics, sending Simply Perfect into the lead soon after the start. She ran on strongly in the straight and held off the challenge of Iridescence to win by a length, with Arch Swing in third and the favourite Nannina in fourth. Explaining his decision to lead early, Murtagh said: "I didn't think there was going to be much pace in the race so I thought she might get an easy lead. Jeremy thought she might be a bit keen but I told him she would settle. She was looking round a bit but she was all go and when I got to the three pole, I thought 'she isn't going to get beat today'." Noseda called the winner "a very tough filly. She has been going since before Royal Ascot last year and she has now won a Group One at two and three." Later in the month, Simply Perfect was sent to France for the Prix d'Astarte at Deauville Racecourse, where she finished third, a length behind the winner Darjina.

On 6 October, Simply Perfect started the 7/2 second favourite for the Group One Sun Chariot Stakes over one mile at Newmarket. She briefly took the lead approaching the final quarter mile before finishing fourth behind Majestic Roi, Nannina and Echelon. Three weeks later, Simply Perfect was sent to the United States to contest the Breeders' Cup Filly & Mare Turf at Monmouth Park Racetrack. Enduring what USA Today called "a horrible journey", she pulled hard in the early stages before bolting to the wide outside on the second turn and being pulled up by Murtagh in the back straight. Her retirement was announced shortly afterwards. Noseda was unable to explain the filly's erratic performance at Monmouth Park, but described her as "a pleasure to train and has been great to have around the yard."

== Breeding record ==
Simply Perfect was retired from racing to become a broodmare for the Coolmore Stud. Her daughter, Really Lovely, sired by Galileo, won a maiden race at Southwell Racecourse in 2011.

== Pedigree ==
Pedigree of Simply Perfect (GB), grey mare, 2004
Sire Danehill (USA) 1986	Danzig (USA); 1977	Northern Dancer	Nearctic
Sire Danehill (USA) 1986	Danzig (USA); 1977	Northern Dancer	Natalma*
Sire Danehill (USA) 1986	Danzig (USA); 1977	Pas de Nom	Admiral's Voyage
Sire Danehill (USA) 1986	Danzig (USA); 1977	Pas de Nom	Petitioner
Sire Danehill (USA) 1986	Rayzana (USA); 1981	His Majesty	Ribot
Sire Danehill (USA) 1986	Rayzana (USA); 1981	His Majesty	Flower Bowl
Sire Danehill (USA) 1986	Rayzana (USA); 1981	Spring Adieu	Buckpasser
Sire Danehill (USA) 1986	Rayzana (USA); 1981	Spring Adieu	Natalma*
Dam Hotelgenie Dot Com (GB) 1998	Selkirk (USA); 1988	Sharpen Up	Atan
Dam Hotelgenie Dot Com (GB) 1998	Selkirk (USA); 1988	Sharpen Up	Rocchetta
Dam Hotelgenie Dot Com (GB) 1998	Selkirk (USA); 1988	Annie Edge	Nebbiolo
Dam Hotelgenie Dot Com (GB) 1998	Selkirk (USA); 1988	Annie Edge	Friendly Court
Dam Hotelgenie Dot Com (GB) 1998	Birch Creek (GB); 1982	Carwhite	Caro
Dam Hotelgenie Dot Com (GB) 1998	Birch Creek (GB); 1982	Carwhite	White Paper
Dam Hotelgenie Dot Com (GB) 1998	Birch Creek (GB); 1982	Deed	Derring-Do
Dam Hotelgenie Dot Com (GB) 1998	Birch Creek (GB); 1982	Deed	Aurorabella (Family: 14-c)

- Like all of Danehill's offspring Simply Perfect is inbred 4 × 4 to the mare Natalma. This means that she occurs twice in the fourth generation of her pedigree.
