= Alpha Centauri (horse) =

Irish-bred Thoroughbred racehorse

- Racing silks of Niarchos Family
- Sire: Mastercraftsman
- Grandsire: Danehill Dancer
- Dam: Alpha Lupi
- Damsire: Rahy
- Sex: Mare
- Foaled: 28 February 2015
- Country: Ireland
- Colour: Grey
- Breeder: Niarchos family
- Owner: Niarchos family
- Trainer: Jessica Harrington
- Record: 10: 6-2-0
- Earnings: ££1,254,827

Major wins
- Fillies' Sprint Stakes (2017); Irish 1,000 Guineas (2018); Coronation Stakes (2018); Falmouth Stakes (2018); Prix Jacques Le Marois (2018)

Awards
- Cartier Champion Three-year-old Filly (2018); Irish Horse of the Year (2018); World's Best three-year-old filly (2018)

Alpha Centauri (foaled 28 February 2015) is an Irish Thoroughbred racehorse. In 2018 she recorded four consecutive Group 1 races, namely the Irish 1,000 Guineas, Coronation Stakes, Falmouth Stakes and Prix Jacques Le Marois.

== Background ==
Alpha Centauri is a "massive" grey mare bred in Ireland by the Niarchos family. She was sent into training with Jessica Harrington at Moone, in County Kildare. She was ridden in all of her races by Colm O'Donoghue.

Her sire Mastercraftsman, from whom she inherited her colour, was a top class performer whose wins included the Phoenix Stakes, National Stakes, Irish 2,000 Guineas and St James's Palace Stakes. As a breeding stallion, his other offspring include Kingston Hill, Amazing Maria and The Grey Gatsby. Her dam Alpha Lupi was unraced, but came from a very successful female bloodline which has been in the ownership of the Niarchos family for several generations: she was a daughter of East of the Moon who was in turn a daughter of Miesque.

== Racing career ==
=== 2017: two-year-old season ===
Alpha Centauri made her racecourse debut on 1 May in a maiden race over six furlongs at Naas Racecourse and was made the 2/1 against thirteen opponents. She led from the start, steadily increased her advantage in the last quarter mile and won "easily" by three lengths from the Aidan O'Brien-trained Actress. Twenty days later, over the same course and distance, the filly started 8/11 favourite for the Group 3 Fillies'Sprint Stakes and recorded another easy win, beating Actress by five lengths. A month later she was sent to England and started favourite in a twenty-runner field for the Albany Stakes but despite finishing strongly he failed to overhaul the French filly Different League and was beaten a neck into second place. After a break of well over two months the filly returned in the Group 1 Moyglare Stud Stakes over seven furlongs at the Curragh and was again made favourite. She raced in second place for most of the way but faded in the closing stages and came home fifth of the eight runners behind Happily.

=== 2018: three-year-old season ===
At Leopardstown Racecourse on 14 April Alpha Centauri began her second season 1,000 Guineas Trial Stakes and finished tenth of the thirteen runners behind Who's Steph in a race run on heavy ground. In the Irish 1000 Guineas over one mile at the Curragh on 27 May, the filly started the 12/1 fifth choice in the betting behind Happily, Soliloquy (Nell Gwyn Stakes), Who's Steph and Clemmie (Cheveley Park Stakes). Alpha Centauri was settled in mid-division as Could It Be Love, a 33/1 outsider who was presumed to be running as a pacemaker for the Aidan O'Brien stable's more fancied runners set off in front and opened up a long lead. Approaching the final furlong Could It Be Love was still in front and looked to be on the verge of a huge upset victory but Alpha Centauri produced a strong late run, gained the advantage in the last hundred yards and won by one and three quarter lengths.

On 22 June at Royal Ascot Alpha Centauri started 11/4 favourite for the Coronation Stakes in a twelve-runner field which included Clemmie, Billesdon Brook, Teppal (Poule d'Essai des Pouliches), Threading (Lowther Stakes) and Cour de Beaute (Prix Imprudence). Having settled towards the middle of the field she overtook the front-running Veracious approaching the final furlong and accelerated away to win by six lengths in "very impressive" style. Harrington, who was recording her first Group 1 win in Britain said "Colm was very confident on her and she settled great. I thought he'd got to the front a bit soon but the further she went, the better she went."

Three weeks later, Alpha Centauri was matched against older fillies and mares in the Falmouth Stakes at Newmarket Racecourse. Starting at odds of 4/9 she took the lead after the first quarter mile and was never in danger of defeat, drawing away in the closing stages to win "easily" by four and a half lengths from Altyn Orda. In the paddock after the race Harrington commented "She's just an amazing filly. And the lovely thing about her, she's so relaxed, she doesn't get upset, she comes in here, has her photograph taken and goes away. I sometimes think, before a race, she's almost too relaxed".

The Prix Jacques Le Marois at Deauville Racecourse on 12 August saw Alpha Centauri tested against male opposition. She went off the 9/10 favourite against ten opponents including With You (Prix Rothschild), Intellogent (Prix Jean Prat), Recoletos (Prix d'Ispahan), Romanised (Irish 2,000 Guineas) and Accidental Agent (Queen Anne Stakes). She tracked the front-running With You before taking the lead 500 metres and drew away to win by two and a half lengths from Recoletos. In response to the performance the official Irish Handicapper gave her a rating of 124, making her the highest-rated Irish-trained three-year-old filly since Ridgewood Pearl in 1995.

In the July and August 2018 editions of the World's Best Racehorse Rankings Alpha Centauri was rated the best three-year-old filly in the world.

On 15 September Alpha Centauri started the 30/100 favourite for the Matron Stakes over one mile at Leopardstown. After turning into the straight in third place she made good progress to move into second but was unable to overhaul the British-trained filly Laurens and was beaten three quarters of a length. She appeared to veer left a furlong out and a veterinary examination revealed that she had sustained a serious injury to her fetlock. On the day after the race it was announced that the filly had been retired from racing. Harrington commented "I've had an amazing summer with her... It was incredible to have her, and no-one can take away what she's done. For her to sustain the injury she did yesterday – and everyone could see when she did it – and still run on to finish second to another very, very good filly says it all".

At the 2018 Cartier Awards, Alpha Centauri was named Champion Three-year-old Filly. In December she was voted Horse of the Year at the Horse Racing Ireland awards. In the 2018 World's Best Racehorse Rankings Alpha Centauri was rated the best three-year-old filly in the world (level with Almond Eye) and the eleventh best horse of any age or sex.

== Pedigree ==
Pedigree of Alpha Centauri (IRE), grey filly, 2015
Sire Mastercraftsman (IRE) 2006	Danehill Dancer (IRE); 1993	Danehill (USA)	Danzig
Sire Mastercraftsman (IRE) 2006	Danehill Dancer (IRE); 1993	Danehill (USA)	Razyana
Sire Mastercraftsman (IRE) 2006	Danehill Dancer (IRE); 1993	Mira Adonde (USA)	Sharpen Up (GB)
Sire Mastercraftsman (IRE) 2006	Danehill Dancer (IRE); 1993	Mira Adonde (USA)	Lettre d'Amour
Sire Mastercraftsman (IRE) 2006	Starlight Dreams (USA); 1995	Black Tie Affair (IRE)	Miswaki (USA)
Sire Mastercraftsman (IRE) 2006	Starlight Dreams (USA); 1995	Black Tie Affair (IRE)	Hat Tab Girl (USA)
Sire Mastercraftsman (IRE) 2006	Starlight Dreams (USA); 1995	Reves Celestes	Lyphard
Sire Mastercraftsman (IRE) 2006	Starlight Dreams (USA); 1995	Reves Celestes	Tobira Celeste
Dam Alpha Lupi (IRE) 2004	Rahy (USA); 1985	Blushing Groom (FR)	Red God (USA)
Dam Alpha Lupi (IRE) 2004	Rahy (USA); 1985	Blushing Groom (FR)	Runaway Bride (GB)
Dam Alpha Lupi (IRE) 2004	Rahy (USA); 1985	Glorious Song (CAN)	Halo (USA)
Dam Alpha Lupi (IRE) 2004	Rahy (USA); 1985	Glorious Song (CAN)	Ballade (USA)
Dam Alpha Lupi (IRE) 2004	East of the Moon (USA); 1991	Private Account	Damascus
Dam Alpha Lupi (IRE) 2004	East of the Moon (USA); 1991	Private Account	Numbered Account
Dam Alpha Lupi (IRE) 2004	East of the Moon (USA); 1991	Miesque	Nureyev
Dam Alpha Lupi (IRE) 2004	East of the Moon (USA); 1991	Miesque	Pasadoble (Family 20)
