= Miesque =

American-bred Thoroughbred racehorse

- Sire: Nureyev
- Grandsire: Northern Dancer
- Dam: Pasadoble
- Damsire: Prove Out
- Sex: Mare
- Foaled: March 14, 1984
- Country: United States
- Colour: Bay
- Breeder: Flaxman Holdings Ltd.
- Owner: Stavros Niarchos
- Trainer: François Boutin
- Record: 16: 12–3–1
- Earnings: $2,096,517

Major wins
- Prix de la Salamandre (1986); Prix Marcel Boussac (1986); Prix Imprudence (1987); Poule d'Essai des Pouliches (1987); Prix du Moulin de Longchamp (1987); 1,000 Guineas (1987); Prix d'Ispahan (1988); Prix Jacques Le Marois (1987 & 1988); Breeders' Cup Mile (1987 & 1988)

Awards
- United States Champion Female Turf Horse (1987 & 1988); French champion two-year-old filly (1986); French and English champion three-year-old filly (1987); French and English champion miler (1987); French champion older female horse (1988); Timeform rating: 133

Honours
- United States Racing Hall of Fame (1999) #82 – Top 100 U.S. Racehorses of the 20th Century; Miesque Stakes at Hollywood Park Racetrack; Prix Miesque at Hippodrome de Maisons-Laffitte

Miesque (/ˈmiːɛsk/ MEE-esk; March 14, 1984 – January 20, 2011) was a champion Thoroughbred racemare. At age three, she was a dual Classic winner in France and Britain, then went on to win the Breeders' Cup Mile in America. Her four-year-old campaign was highlighted by another win in the Mile, making her the first horse to win two consecutive Breeders' Cup races. She was a Group One/Grade I (G1) winner at two, three and four-years-old, for a total of 10 G1 wins. She was inducted into the American Racing Hall of Fame in 1999.

Miesque was equally successful as a broodmare, producing five stakes winners including French Classic winners Kingmambo and East of the Moon.

== Background ==
Miesque was bred in Lexington, Kentucky by Flaxman Holdings, the breeding operation of shipping tycoon Stavros Niarchos. She was sired by Nureyev, a stakes-winner for Niarchos who became a champion sire in France before being exported to the United States. Nureyev was a son of breed-shaping sire Northern Dancer. Her dam was Pasadoble, a stakes-winning mare by Prove Out. Miesque was a full sister to stakes winners Massaraat and Bravemie, and a half sister to stakes producers Yogya by Riverman and One Life by L'Emigrant.

Miesque raced as a homebred for Niarchos, and did most of her racing in Europe. She was stabled in France and trained by François Boutin. The barn staff nicknamed her "La Concierge" because of her interest in what was happening around her.

== Racing record ==
Miesque won three of her four races as a two-year-old, including the French Group One (G1) Prix de la Salamandre over 1,400 metres (7.0 furlongs) and the Prix Marcel Boussac over 1,600 metres (8.0 furlongs). Her sole loss was a third-place finish in the Prix Morny. She was named the French Champion two-year-old filly of 1986.

Under jockey Freddy Head, at age three Miesque won the 1,000 Guineas in England and the Poule d'Essai des Pouliches (the French 1,000 Guineas). When moved up in distance she finished second to Indian Skimmer in the Prix de Diane. Competing against colts and older horses she added wins in the Prix Jacques le Marois and the Prix du Moulin but was defeated by the British filly Milligram in the Queen Elizabeth II Stakes. Miesque achieved international stardom when she defeated a talented field of mostly male horses in the prestigious 1987 Breeders' Cup Mile, in the process setting a Hollywood Park course record of 1:32 4/5. Her powerful performance earned her the 1987 Eclipse Award for Outstanding Female Turf Horse. She was named the champion miler and champion three-year-old filly in both France and England.

The following year, Miesque raced only four times, winning three and finishing second once. In France, she won the Prix d'Ispahan, stretching out in distance to 1,800 metres (8.9 furlongs). She finished second by a head to Soviet Star in the Prix du Moulin, then defeated Warning for her second win in the Prix Jacques le Marois. She returned to the U.S. to defend her Breeders Cup title at Churchill Downs in Kentucky and once again was up against a very strong field of older males including Warning, Belmont Stakes winner Bet Twice and Steinlen. Despite the fierce competition, the filly won the race by four lengths, making her the first ever back-to-back winner in Breeders Cup history. Miesque's win came over a sodden turf course, described by Warning's jockey Pat Eddery as "the worst turf I've ever ridden on." Miesque's connection never considered scratching her despite the filly's preference for firmer footing. "When you win the Breeders' Cup, then you know why you come", said Maria Niarchos. "You come to win!"

The performance earned her a second straight Eclipse Award for Outstanding Female Turf Horse for 1988 and she was again voted France's Champion Miler of the year plus was named that country's Champion Older Mare. Miesque retired after the 1988 season. Of her sixteen lifetime races, the filly won twelve, finished second three times, and third once.

== Breeding record ==
She was a successful broodmare at the Niarchos stud farm in Kentucky. She produced 14 named foals, six of which were winners. Her daughters have in turn become successful producers and the family produced two classic winners in 2018 alone. Recently, her maternal-line descendant Loves Only You won the 2021 Breeders' Cup Filly & Mare Turf. Miesque's offspring include:

- Kingmambo: 1990, colt by Mr Prospector – won G1 Poule d'Essai des Poulains, Prix du Moulin de Longchamp and St. James's Palace Stakes at Royal Ascot. Kingmambo was an outstanding sire standing at Lane's End Farm at Versailles in Kentucky; sired Lemon Drop Kid, Henrythenavigator, King's Best, El Condor Pasa, Russian Rhythm, and Divine Proportions
- East of the Moon: 1991, filly by Private Account – Champion three-year-old filly in France 1994, won Poule d'Essai des Pouliches, Prix de Diane, Prix Jacques Le Marois. Stakes producer and second dam of 2018 Irish 1000 Guineas winner Alpha Centauri
- Miesque's Son: 1992, colt by Mr Prospector – won G3 Prix de Ris-Orangis, successful sire in America; sired Miesque's Approval, winner of the 2006 Breeders' Cup Mile and voted the 2006 Eclipse Award for Outstanding Male Turf Horse
- Moon Is Up: 1993, filly by Woodman – won LR Prix de Lieurey. stakes producer and second dam of Karakontie, who won both the Poule d'Essai des Poulains and Breeders' Cup Mile in 2014
- Monevassia: 1994, filly by Mr Prospector – non-winner. dam of Rumplestiltskin (IRE), European champion two-year-old filly of 2005 who won G1 Moyglare Stud Stakes, Prix Marcel Boussac. Monevassia is also the second dam of Real Steel and Loves Only You.
- Mingun: 2000, colt by A. P. Indy – won 3 races including Meld Stakes
- Second Happiness: 2002, filly by Storm Cat (USA) – unplaced only race in France 2005. dam of Study of Man, 2018 winner of the Prix du Jockey Club (French Derby) and stakes winner Tale of Life (JPN) 2012, both by Deep Impact

Miesque was euthanized at Lane's End Farm on January 20, 2011, at the age of 27.

== Honors ==
Miesque was inducted into the National Museum of Racing and Hall of Fame in 1999. In the Blood-Horse magazine ranking of the top 100 U.S. thoroughbred champions of the 20th Century, Miesque was ranked #82.

The annual Prix Miesque at the Hippodrome in Maisons-Laffitte, Yvelines is held in her honor. In America, the Miesque Stakes was run at Hollywood Park Racetrack, where Miesque won her first Breeders' Cup Mile, until that track closed in 2013.

== Pedigree ==
Pedigree of Miesque (USA), bay mare, 1984
Sire Nureyev	Northern Dancer (CAN)	Nearctic	Nearco
Sire Nureyev	Northern Dancer (CAN)	Nearctic	Lady Angela
Sire Nureyev	Northern Dancer (CAN)	Natalma	Native Dancer
Sire Nureyev	Northern Dancer (CAN)	Natalma	Almahmoud
Sire Nureyev	Special; 1969	Forli (ARG)	Aristophanes
Sire Nureyev	Special; 1969	Forli (ARG)	Trevisa
Sire Nureyev	Special; 1969	Thong	Nantallah
Sire Nureyev	Special; 1969	Thong	Rough Shod II
Dam Pasodoble 1979	Prove Out	Graustark	Ribot
Dam Pasodoble 1979	Prove Out	Graustark	Flower Bowl
Dam Pasodoble 1979	Prove Out	Equal Venture	Bold Venture
Dam Pasodoble 1979	Prove Out	Equal Venture	Igual
Dam Pasodoble 1979	Santa Quilla (FR); 1970	Sanctus	Fine Top
Dam Pasodoble 1979	Santa Quilla (FR); 1970	Sanctus	Sanelta
Dam Pasodoble 1979	Santa Quilla (FR); 1970	Neriad	Princequillo
Dam Pasodoble 1979	Santa Quilla (FR); 1970	Neriad	Sea-Change

== See also ==
- List of leading Thoroughbred racehorses
