= Dancing Rain =

Irish Thoroughbred racehorse

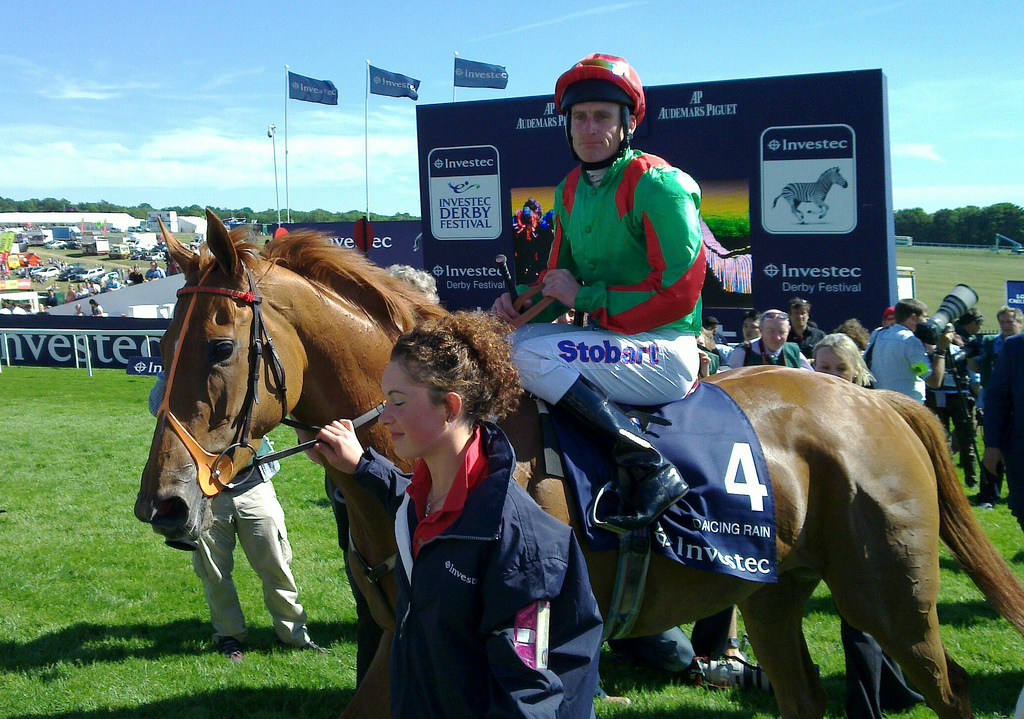
- Dancing Rain after her win in the 2011 Epsom Oaks with jockey Johnny Murtagh.
- Sire: Danehill Dancer
- Grandsire: Danehill
- Dam: Rain Flower
- Damsire: Indian Ridge
- Sex: Mare
- Foaled: 24 April 2008
- Country: Ireland
- Colour: Chestnut
- Breeder: Swettenham Stud
- Owner: 1) Martin J. and Lee A. Taylor; 2) Sheikh Mohammed
- Trainer: William Haggas
- Record: 10: 4-2-1
- Earnings: £ 572,503

Major wins
- Epsom Oaks (2011); British Champions Fillies' and Mares' Stakes (2011); Preis der Diana (2011)

Dancing Rain (foaled on 24 April 2008) is a retired Thoroughbred mare that was bred in Ireland and raced in the United Kingdom, Ireland, Germany and Japan. Dancing Rain was the unanticipated winner of the 2011 Epsom Oaks and won the Preis der Diana in the later part of her three-year-old season. Her form faltered late in her three-year-old year, finishing 16th out of a field of 19 horses in the Queen Elizabeth II Commemorative Cup in Japan. Her four-year-old season was plagued with injury and she did not run in a race until late October 2012. Retired at the end of 2012, Dancing Rain became a broodmare at Clairemont Stud in Hampshire and was subsequently sold to Sheik Mohammed bin Rashid Al Maktoum for £4.2m while in foal to Frankel.

== Background ==
Dancing Rain was bred by Swettenham Stud, a breeding operation owned by the Sangster family, and was foaled on 24 April 2008 at Camas Park Stud in Tipperary. Dancing Rain's sire, Danehill Dancer, stands at Coolmore Stud and also produced Choisir, a renowned sprinter. Her dam, Rain Flower, did not race and is a three-quarters sister to Epsom Derby winner Dr Devious. Rain Flower has produced nine foals to date, and five of her offspring have gone on to win races.

Dancing Rain was consigned as a yearling by Camas Park Stud to the 2009 Goff's Orby Million and Sportsman's Yearling Sale in Ireland as lot ("Hip") number 4, where she was purchased by Liam Norris and William Huntingdon for €200,000 ($292,120). Norris and Huntingdon purchased Dancing Rain on behalf of brothers Martin and Lee Taylor.

== Racing career ==
Dancing Rain was trained by William Haggas, who also trained the 1996 Epsom Derby winner Shaamit, at his Somerville Lodge Stables in Newmarket. Dancing Rain won four of her ten career starts and was second twice.

=== 2010: two-year-old start ===
Dancing Rain was not a promising racehorse during her early training and was initially labeled as "hopeless" by her trainer. She improved late in the season and her first and only start as a two-year-old occurred on 19 October at Yarmouth for the Division 1 European Breeders' Fund Maiden Fillies Stakes. She was ridden by Michael Hills and was beaten by 3.5 lengths by the filly Annedah, who was owned by Ali Saeed.

=== 2011: three-year-old season ===
Dancing Rain won her first start as a three-year-old in the Robert Sangster Memorial Maiden Fillies Stakes on 15 April at Newbury Racecourse. She was jockeyed by Kieren Fallon who gave her "an uncompromising ride" and pushed the filly to the front to win the race by one and a quarter lengths from Highest. She was second in her next start at Newbury for the Fillies' Trial Stakes on 13 May, losing by a head to Izzi Top who was ridden by Dane O'Neill.

One month before Dancing Rain's start in the Oaks, the filly broke the leg of her exercise rider and her trainer's wife, Maureen Haggas (a daughter of Lester Piggott) while performing drills. Dancing Rain was not favored to win the Oaks, starting the race with 20-1 odds. She was ridden by three-time Derby winning jockey Johnny Murtagh. She won by three quarters of a length over Wonder of Wonders and eleven other horses.

Dancing Rain finished fifth in the Irish Oaks on 17 July, leading the race three furlongs from the finish line and weakening under "a relentless drive" from the winning filly Blue Bunting and passed by Banimpire, Wonder of Wonders and Laughing Lashes. Dancing Rain became the first British-trained winner of the €400,000 Preis der Diana on 7 August in Düsseldorf, and ridden by Kieren Fallon, "she shot away from her rivals in the straight" to win by a margin of three lengths. She won again at Ascot in the British Champions Fillies' and Mares' Stakes beating Bible Belt by two lengths.

In her final start of the season, Dancing Rain ran in the Queen Elizabeth II Commemorative Cup in Kyoto Racecourse. A few days before the race, Dancing Rain developed "some heat in her front legs" that was treated with ice baths. Dancing Rain was "never a factor" in the race, finishing in 16th place, far behind Snow Fairy who won the race for a consecutive year.

=== 2012: four-year-old season ===
Dancing Rain sustained an ankle injury in the spring of 2012 and her engagement in the Coronation Cup was suspended. Surgery was performed in the spring of 2012. Dancing Rain was engaged for the Yorkshire Oaks, but a week before the race Haggas withdrew her from competition, stating, "I'm afraid she won't be going to York as we're just not happy with her." In her first start of the season, she was third in the British Champions Fillies' and Mares' Stakes run at Ascot, losing by two and three quarters lengths to Sapphire and Shirocco Star. On 9 December ridden by Johnny Murtagh, Dancing Rain finished eighth out of 12 starters in the Hong Kong Vase won by Red Cadeaux.

== Breeding career ==
Dancing Rain was retired from racing at the end of 2012 to her owner's Clairemont Stud in Hampshire. She was confirmed to be in foal to Frankel and in December 2013, while still in foal to Frankel, she was auctioned for 4 million guineas (£4.2m) at Tattersalls sales to John Ferguson, acting on behalf of Sheikh Mohammed. The selling price was the second-highest price ever paid at auction for a broodmare in Europe at the time. Dancing Rain gave birth to her first foal, a bay filly by Frankel, in February 2014. Bred to New Approach, she produced another filly in February 2015.

- 2014 Rainswept (GB) : Bay mare, foaled 5 February, by Frankel (GB) - entered training with Andre Fabre at Chantilly; unraced.
- 2015 Magic Lily (GB): Chestnut mare, foaled 11 February, by New Approach (IRE)- Won Cape Verdi, third in the Group 1 bet365 Fillies' Mile.
- 2016 Jalmoud (GB): Chestnut colt (gelded) by New Approach (IRE), foaled 24 February- Won Listed Prix de l'Avre.
- 2017 Sakura Petal (GB): Chestnut filly, foaled by Dubawi (IRE)

== Pedigree ==
Pedigree of Dancing Rain (IRE), Chestnut mare, 2008
| Sire Danehill Dancer (IRE) Bay 1993 | Danehill; 1986 | Danzig | Northern Dancer |
| Sire Danehill Dancer (IRE) Bay 1993 | Danehill; 1986 | Danzig | Pas de Nom |
| Sire Danehill Dancer (IRE) Bay 1993 | Danehill; 1986 | Razyana | His Majesty |
| Sire Danehill Dancer (IRE) Bay 1993 | Danehill; 1986 | Razyana | Spring Adieu |
| Sire Danehill Dancer (IRE) Bay 1993 | Mira Adonde; 1986 | Sharpen Up | Atan |
| Sire Danehill Dancer (IRE) Bay 1993 | Mira Adonde; 1986 | Sharpen Up | Rocchetta |
| Sire Danehill Dancer (IRE) Bay 1993 | Mira Adonde; 1986 | Lettre D'Amour | Caro |
| Sire Danehill Dancer (IRE) Bay 1993 | Mira Adonde; 1986 | Lettre D'Amour | Lianga |
| Dam Rain Flower (IRE) Chestnut 1997 | Indian Ridge; 1985 | Ahonoora | Lorenzaccio |
| Dam Rain Flower (IRE) Chestnut 1997 | Indian Ridge; 1985 | Ahonoora | Helen Nichols |
| Dam Rain Flower (IRE) Chestnut 1997 | Indian Ridge; 1985 | Hillbrow | Swing Easy |
| Dam Rain Flower (IRE) Chestnut 1997 | Indian Ridge; 1985 | Hillbrow | Golden City |
| Dam Rain Flower (IRE) Chestnut 1997 | Rose of Jerico; 1984 | Alleged | Hoist the Flag |
| Dam Rain Flower (IRE) Chestnut 1997 | Rose of Jerico; 1984 | Alleged | Princess Pout |
| Dam Rain Flower (IRE) Chestnut 1997 | Rose of Jerico; 1984 | Rose Red | Northern Dancer |
| Dam Rain Flower (IRE) Chestnut 1997 | Rose of Jerico; 1984 | Rose Red | Cambrienne |

- Dancing Rain is distantly inbred 4 × 4 to Northern Dancer, meaning this horse appears twice in the fourth generation of her pedigree. Dancing Rain is also distantly inbred 5 × 5 to Ribot, that horse being the sire of both His Majesty and Hoist The Flag.
