= Finsceal Beo =

Irish-bred Thoroughbred racehorse

- Sire: Mr. Greeley
- Grandsire: Gone West
- Dam: Musical Treat
- Damsire: Royal Academy
- Sex: Filly
- Foaled: 2004
- Country: Ireland
- Colour: Chestnut
- Breeder: Rathberry Stud
- Owner: Michael Ryan
- Trainer: Jim Bolger
- Record: 14: 5-3-1
- Earnings: £748,174

Major wins
- Prix Marcel Boussac (2006); Rockfel Stakes (2006); 1,000 Guineas (2007); Irish 1,000 Guineas (2007)

Awards
- European Champion Two-Year-Old Filly (2006)
- Last updated on 18 June 2008

Finsceal Beo (Gaelic for "living legend") (foaled 19 February 2004 in Ireland) is a European champion thoroughbred racehorse.

She is one of only two horses ever to win both the Irish 1,000 Guineas and the English 1,000 Guineas. She missed her chance at a "Triple" when she ran second in France to Darjina in the 2007 Poule d'Essai des Pouliches at Longchamp Racecourse.

Stud Record

2010 Finsceal Fior (IRE) : Bay colt, foaled 1 January, by Galileo (IRE) - unraced due to injury, standing at Greenhills Stud, Co. Waterford

2011 Too The Stars (IRE) : Chestnut filly, foaled 25 February, by Sea The Stars (IRE) - won 1 race and placed twice from 4 starts in England 2014

2012 Ol' Man River (IRE) : Bay colt, foaled 7 March, by Montjeu (IRE) - won 2 races from 2 starts in Ireland 2014, including G2 Beresford S, the Curragh

2013 An Cailin Orga (IRE) : Chestnut filly, foaled 19 March, by Galileo (IRE) - won 1 race and placed once from 3 starts in 2016 to date 10/06/16

2014 La Figlia (IRE) : Chestnut filly, foaled 25 March, by Frankel (GB) - unraced to date 10/05/16

2015 Chesnut filly by Frankel (GB)

2016 Colt by Dubawi (IRE)
