= Mastercraftsman =

Irish-bred Thoroughbred racehorse

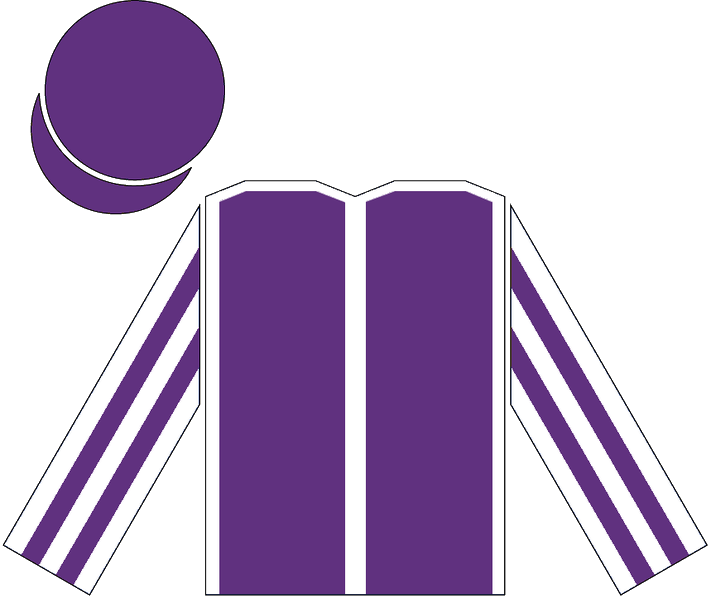
- Racing silks of Derrick Smith
- Sire: Danehill Dancer
- Grandsire: Danehill
- Dam: Starlight Dreams
- Damsire: Black Tie Affair
- Sex: Stallion
- Foaled: 19 February 2006
- Died: 13 August 2021 (aged 15)
- Country: Ireland
- Colour: Grey
- Breeder: Lynch Bages Ltd.
- Owner: Derrick Smith, Susan Magnier, Michael Tabor
- Trainer: Aidan O'Brien
- Record: 11:7-1-1
- Earnings: £976,946

Major wins
- Railway Stakes (2008); Phoenix Stakes (2008); National Stakes (2008); Irish 2,000 Guineas (2009); St. James's Palace Stakes (2009); Diamond Stakes (2009)

Awards
- European Champion Two-Year-Old Colt (2008)

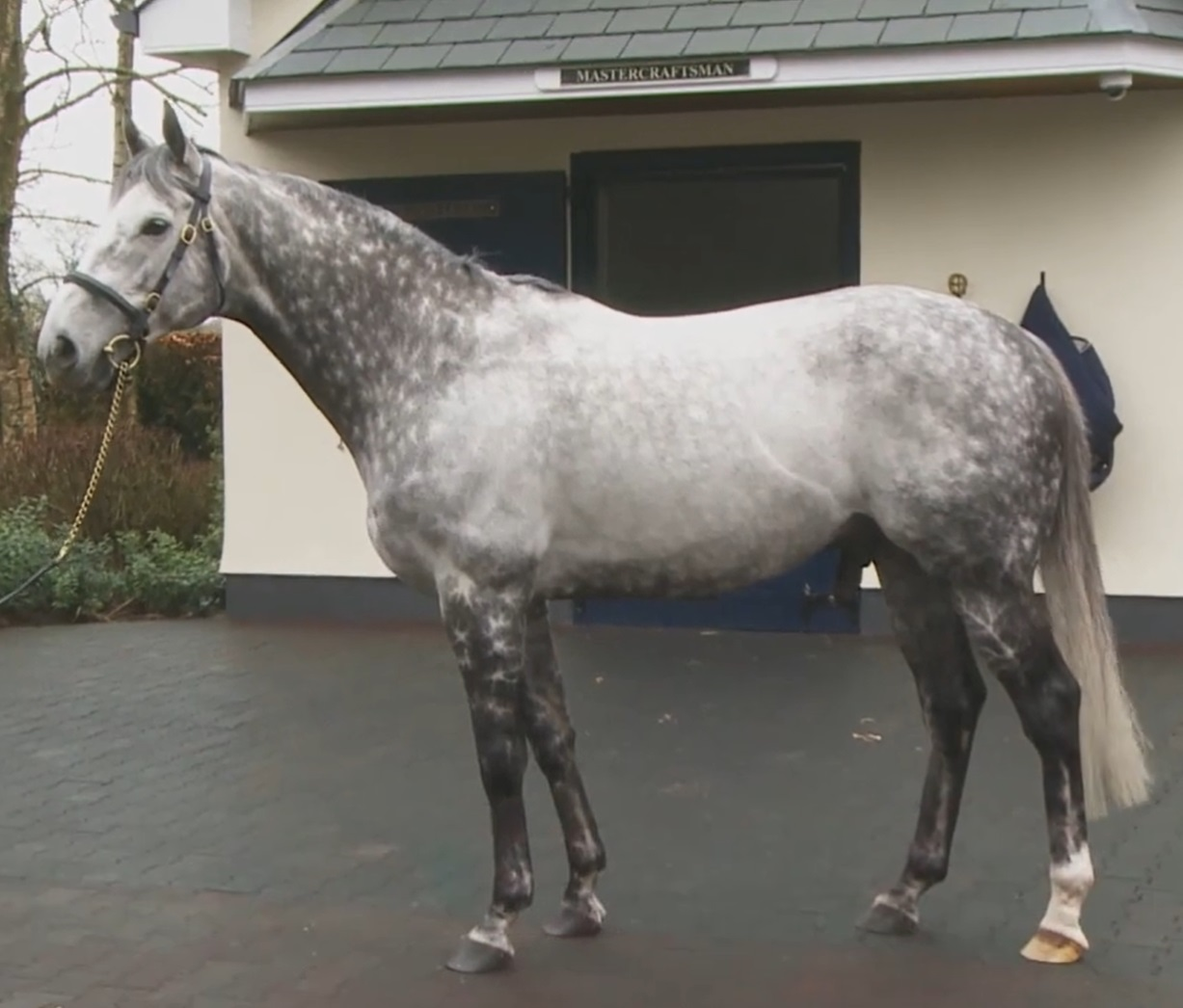
Mastercraftsman at Coolmore Stud Ireland 2015

Mastercraftsman (19 February 2006 – 13 August 2021) was a Champion Thoroughbred racehorse. The four-time Group One-winning colt was trained by Aidan O'Brien and was ridden by Johnny Murtagh in all of his wins. He was out of mare Starlight Dreams and by top stallion Danehill Dancer.

== Racing career ==
=== 2008: two-year-old season ===
Mastercraftsman's career began in a six-furlong maiden at the Curragh in May 2008, where he won by half a length. He won two more races over 6 furlongs at the Curragh, the group 2 Railway stakes and group 1 Phoenix stakes. His second group 1 win came when stepped up in trip to 7 furlongs in the National Stakes. It was not until his first race outside Ireland that he was defeated. He was beaten into fourth place by the Freddy Head trained Naaqoos in the Prix Jean-Luc Lagardère at Maisons-Laffitte in France. Nevertheless, wins in three important conditions races earned Mastercraftsman 2008 European Champion Two-Year-Old Colt honors.

=== 2009: three-year-old season ===
Mastercraftsman's first race of 2009 was the English 2000 Guineas ridden by Pat Smullen. The race was won by Sea the Stars with Mastercraftsman finishing in 5th place and behind Aidan O'Brien's other runner Rip Van Winkle. Success came in the Irish version of the classic with Mastercraftsman starting favourite and going on to win by 4 and a half lengths. A few weeks later he returned to England to win the St. James's Palace Stakes at Royal Ascot. Mastercraftsman contested the International Stakes and Irish Champion Stakes finishing in 2nd and 3rd place respectively behind winner Sea the Stars. He easily won the Group 3 Diamond Stakes as odds on favourite before a trip to the Breeders' Cup. He was favourite to win his last race the Breeders' Cup Dirt Mile but could only manage 4th place behind the Kentucky Cup Classic winner Furthest Land.

== Stud career ==
Mastercaftsman was retired to stand at Coolmore Stud in 2010. He died from a suspected heart attack at Coolmore on 13 August 2021.

=== Notable stock ===
c = colt, f = filly, g = gelding

Foaled	Name	Sex	Major Wins
2011	Amazing Maria	f	Falmouth Stakes, Prix Rothschild
2011	Kingston Hill	c	Racing Post Trophy, St Leger Stakes
2011	Saint Emilion	g	New Zealand Stakes
2011	Thee Auld Floozie	f	Thorndon Mile
2011	The Grey Gatsby	c	French Derby, Irish Champion Stakes
2012	Off Limits	f	Matriarch Stakes
2012	Valley Girl	f	Herbie Dyke Stakes
2013	A Raving Beauty	f	Just a Game Stakes
2014	Danzdanzdance	f	Captain Cook Stakes, Zabeel Classic
2015	Alpha Centauri	f	Irish 1,000 Guineas, Coronation Stakes, Falmouth Stakes, Prix Jacques Le Marois
2015	Ya Primo	c	Derby de Chile, Gran Premio Latinoamericano
2016	Technician	c	Prix Royal-Oak
2019	Discoveries	f	Moyglare Stud Stakes
2019	Giavellotto	c	Hong Kong Vase
