= No Nay Never =

American-bred Thoroughbred racehorse

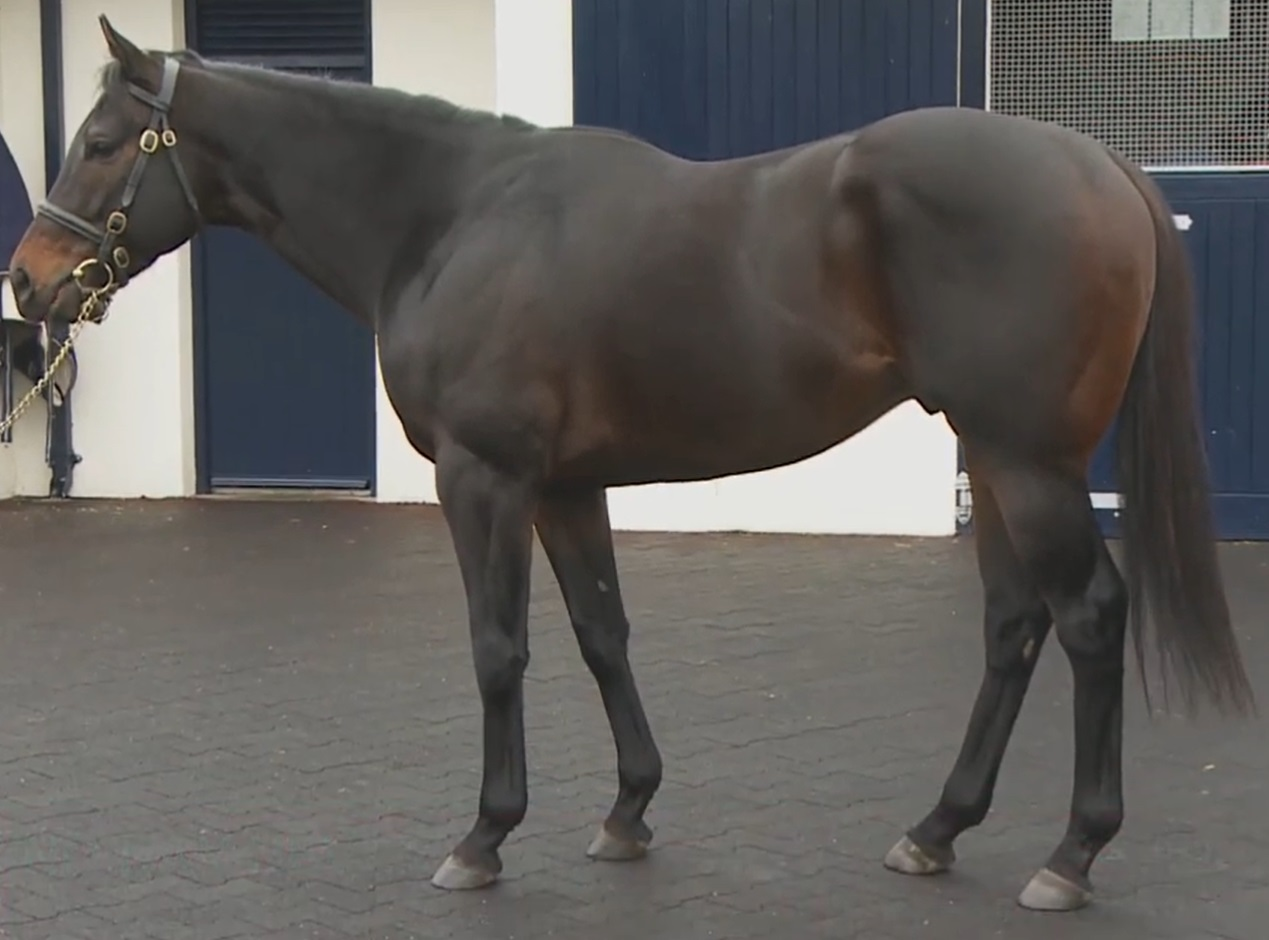
- At Coolmore Stud Ireland 2015
- Sire: Scat Daddy
- Grandsire: Johannesburg
- Dam: Cat's Eye Witness
- Damsire: Elusive Quality
- Sex: Stallion
- Foaled: 1 March 2011
- Country: United States
- Colour: Dark Bay or Brown
- Breeder: Jayne Doi Johnson & David Sparrow
- Owner: Ice Wine Stables; Magnier, Tabor & Smith et al.
- Trainer: Wesley Ward
- Record: 6:4-2-0

Major wins
- Norfolk Stakes (2013); Prix Morny (2013); Woodford Stakes (2014)

For the Irish folk song, see: The Wild Rover

No Nay Never (foaled 1 March 2011) is a retired American Thoroughbred racehorse and breeding stallion. As a two-year-old he was unbeaten in three races and was best known for his exploits in Europe where he won the Norfolk Stakes at Royal Ascot in England and the Prix Morny in France. He was noted for his speed over sprint distances and was rated one of the best juvenile colts to race in Europe in 2013. As a three-year-old he won the Woodford Stakes and was narrowly beaten when favorite for the Breeders' Cup Turf Sprint.

== Background ==
No Nay Never is an unusually large bay colt bred in Kentucky by Jayne Doi Johnson & David Sparrow. He was sired by Scat Daddy who won the Champagne Stakes in 2006 and the Florida Derby in 2007 before his racing career was ended by injury. Scat Daddy's other offspring include Daddy Long Legs and the American Oaks winner Lady of Shamrock.

As a foal in November 2011, No Nay Never was consigned by Hunter Valley Farm to the Keeneland Breeding Stock sale where he was bought for $170,000 by Chestnut Valley. The colt was returned to the sales at Keeneland in September 2012 where he was sold for $95,000 to Cromwell Bloodstock. No Nay Never entered the ownership of Ice Wine Stables and was sent into training with Wesley Ward. He usually raced in a hood.

== Racing career ==
=== 2013: two-year-old season ===
No Nay Never made his racecourse debut in a maiden race over 4 1/2 furlongs on the synthetic Polytrack surface at Keeneland Racecourse on April 26. Ridden by Joel Rosario he started 8/10 favourite and led from the start, winning by two lengths from Solitary Ranger, with a gap of 6 1/2 lengths back to the rest of the nine runner field.

In June, No Nay Never was sent to Europe to contest the Group Three Norfolk Stakes over five furlongs at Royal Ascot. His trainer, Wesley Ward, had had previous success at the Ascot meeting, winning the Windsor Castle Stakes with Strike the Tiger and the Queen Mary Stakes with Jealous Again in 2009. Ridden again by Rosario, No Nay Never started the 4/1 second favourite behind the Aidan O'Brien-trained Coach House in a field of fourteen runners. The American colt started poorly, bumping against the side of the starting stalls but quickly took the lead, before being settled by Rosario. He regained the lead inside the final furlong and won impressively by a length and a head from Coach House and Wind Fire. The winning time of 58.8 was a new course record for two-year-olds. After the race Rosario said "I'm happy to be here and it's awesome. He put it all together, took me to the lead and is a good horse".

Two months later, No Nay Never returned to Europe for the Group One Prix Morny over 1200 m at Deauville Racecourse, despite concerns that the colt might struggle to show his best form on the soft turf. He was ridden by David Flores and started at odds of 7/4 with his main opposition expected to come from the fillies Vorda (Prix Robert Papin) and Rizeena (Queen Mary Stakes). The colt was among the leaders from the start before accelerating away from the field 200 m from the finish and winning by a length from Vorda, with Rizeena three quarters of a length away in third. The Racing Post described him as a "raw and explosive talent", whilst Ward expressed the opinion that his success should encourage more North American owners and trainers to try their horses in Europe. The form of No Nay Never's win was boosted when Vorda and Rizeena won the Cheveley Park Stakes and the Moyglare Stud Stakes respectively. No Nay Never did not race again in 2013, with Wesley Ward saying that the colt would probably begin his 2014 campaign in North America before returning to Europe for the St James's Palace Stakes.

In the official European ratings published in January 2014, No Nay Never tied with War Command as the third-best two-year-old of 2013, behind Toormore and the Cartier Award winner Kingston Hill.

=== 2014: three-year-old season ===
On his first appearance as a three-year-old, No Nay Never made his debut on dirt when he started 2/5 favourite for the Grade II Swale Stakes at Gulfstream Park on March 1. He took the lead early in the straight but was overtaken a furlong from the finish and beaten 2 1/2 lengths by Spot.

After a break of more than seven months, No Nay Never returned in the Grade III Woodford Stakes over 5 1/2 furlongs at Keeneland Racecourse on October 4. Ridden by Mike Smith he disputed the lead from the start, went two lengths clear in the straight, and held on to win by half a length from the four-year-old Mongol Bull. After the race, Ward said that he was "leaning" towards running the colt in the Breeders' Cup Sprint. The colt's connections opted to bypass the Breeders' Cup Sprint, running instead in the Breeders' Cup Turf Sprint at Santa Anita Park on November 1. Ridden by Frankie Dettori, he started the 18/5 favourite against thirteen opponents. He took the lead inside the final furlong but was overtaken in the last strides by Bobby's Kitten and finished second in a blanket finish, half a length behind the winner. After the race Dettori said "They came so wide he didn't have time to fight back. The race went to plan and we just got robbed on the line".

== Stud career ==
No Nay Never performs stallion duties at Coolmore Stud. His first progeny began racing in 2018. He sired more than 25 individual winners from his first crop, leading to an increase in his stud fee from €25,000 to €100,000 for the 2019 covering season. By 2023 his fee had increased to €175,000 but it was reduced to €150,000 for 2024, and again to €125,000 for 2025.

=== Notable progeny ===
c = colt, f = filly, g = gelding

Foaled	Name	Sex	Major wins
2016	Ten Sovereigns	c	Middle Park Stakes, July Cup
2018	Alcohol Free	f	Cheveley Park Stakes, Coronation Stakes, Sussex Stakes, July Cup
2019	Madame Pommery	f	The Thousand Guineas
2020	Little Big Bear	c	Phoenix Stakes
2020	Blackbeard	c	Middle Park Stakes
2020	Massive Sovereign	g	Hong Kong Derby
2020	Meditate	f	Breeders' Cup Juvenile Fillies Turf
2021	Never So Brave	g	City of York Stakes
2022	Whistlejacket	c	Prix Morny
2023	True Love	f	Cheveley Park Stakes, 1000 Guineas, Prix de la Forêt
2023	Mission Central	g	King Charles III Stakes
2024	Amusingly	f	Prix Jean-Luc Lagardere
2024	Libertango	f	Breeders' Cup Juvenile Turf Sprint

== Pedigree ==
Pedigree of No Nay Never, bay colt, 2011
Sire Scat Daddy (USA) 2004	Johannesburg (USA); 1999	Hennessy	Storm Cat
Sire Scat Daddy (USA) 2004	Johannesburg (USA); 1999	Hennessy	Island Kitty
Sire Scat Daddy (USA) 2004	Johannesburg (USA); 1999	Myth	Ogygian
Sire Scat Daddy (USA) 2004	Johannesburg (USA); 1999	Myth	Yarn
Sire Scat Daddy (USA) 2004	Love Style (USA); 1999	Mr. Prospector	Raise a Native
Sire Scat Daddy (USA) 2004	Love Style (USA); 1999	Mr. Prospector	Gold Digger
Sire Scat Daddy (USA) 2004	Love Style (USA); 1999	Likeable Style	Nijinsky
Sire Scat Daddy (USA) 2004	Love Style (USA); 1999	Likeable Style	Personable Lady
Dam Cat's Eye Witness (USA) 2003	Elusive Quality (USA); 1993	Gone West	Mr. Prospector
Dam Cat's Eye Witness (USA) 2003	Elusive Quality (USA); 1993	Gone West	Secrettame
Dam Cat's Eye Witness (USA) 2003	Elusive Quality (USA); 1993	Touch of Greatness	Hero's Honor
Dam Cat's Eye Witness (USA) 2003	Elusive Quality (USA); 1993	Touch of Greatness	Ivory Wand
Dam Cat's Eye Witness (USA) 2003	Comical Cat (USA); 1985	Exceller	Vaguely Noble
Dam Cat's Eye Witness (USA) 2003	Comical Cat (USA); 1985	Exceller	Too Bald
Dam Cat's Eye Witness (USA) 2003	Comical Cat (USA); 1985	Six Months Long	Northern Dancer
Dam Cat's Eye Witness (USA) 2003	Comical Cat (USA); 1985	Six Months Long	Prime Time (Family:3-l)

No Nay Never is inbred 3 x 4 to Mr. Prospector. This means that the stallion appears in both the third and the fourth generation of his pedigree.
