= Little Big Bear =

Irish Thoroughbred racehorse

- Sire: No Nay Never
- Grandsire: Scat Daddy
- Dam: Adventure Seeker
- Damsire: Bering
- Sex: Colt
- Foaled: 15 January 2020
- Country: Ireland
- Colour: Bay
- Breeder: Camas Park Stud & Summerhill
- Owner: Michael Tabor, Derrick Smith, Sue Magnier & Westerberg
- Trainer: Aidan O'Brien
- Record: 9: 5-2-0
- Earnings: £445,903

Major wins
- Windsor Castle Stakes (2022); Anglesey Stakes (2022); Phoenix Stakes (2022); Sandy Lane Stakes (2023)

Awards
- Top-rated European Two-year-old (2022)

Little Big Bear (foaled 15 January 2020) is an Irish-bred Thoroughbred racehorse. He was rated the best two-year-old in Europe in 2022 when he won four of his five races including the Windsor Castle Stakes, Anglesey Stakes and Phoenix Stakes. The following season he added to his victories with a win in the Sandy Lane Stakes. His retirement from racing, due to injury, was announced in August 2023.

== Background ==
Little Big Bear is a bay colt with no white markings bred in Ireland by the County Tipperary-based Camas Park Stud & Summerhill. As a yearling he was consigned to the Arqana Deauville August Yearling Sale and was bought for €320 000 by the bloodstock agency Mandore. He raced in the ownership of the Coolmore Stud partners Michael Tabor, Sue Magnier and Derrick Smith in association with Georg von Opel's Westerberg organisation. He was sent into training with Aidan O'Brien at Ballydoyle.

Little Big Bear is from the fifth crop of foals sired by No Nay Never, an American horse who had his greatest success in Europe where he won the Norfolk Stakes and the Prix Morny as a juvenile in 2013. His other foals have included Ten Sovereigns, Blackbeard and Alcohol Free. His dam Adventure Seeker showed some racing ability as she won the Listed Prix de Liancourt and finished fourth in the E P Taylor Stakes. She was a granddaughter of the outstanding French racemare All Along.

== Racing career ==
=== 2022: two-year-old season ===
Little Big Bear was ridden in all but one of his races as a two-year-old by Ryan Moore. He began his racing career in a maiden race over six furlongs on yielding ground at the Curragh on 10 April when he started the 7/4 favourite but was caught on the line and beaten a short head by the Ger Lyons-trained Tough Talk. Seamie Heffernan took the ride four weeks later when the colt started 4/9 favourite for a similar event over five furlongs at Naas Racecourse and recorded his first success as he took the lead a furlong out and won "easily" by three lengths from Alexis Zorba. For his next race the colt was sent to England and moved up in class for the Listed Windsor Castle Stakes over five furlongs on good to firm ground at Royal Ascot on 15 June. Starting the 6/5 favourite in a 24-runner field he was among the leaders from the start, gained the advantage inside the final furlong and held off a late challenge from the outsider Rocket Rodney to win by a neck. After the race Aidan O'Brien said “Ryan rode him work in the week and was happy with him. He should get further in the future too and is in the Phoenix Stakes. He is a big horse. It is obviously a very fast race and horses need to know a lot in it and be very educated. He had only had the two runs, so we were a bit worried about that, but we're delighted really."

On 16 July Little Big Bear started 2/5 favourite for the Group 3 Anglesey Stakes over 6 1/2 furlongs at the Curragh. He raced in second place before taking the lead two furlongs out and drew away in the closing stages to win "easily" by 4 3/4 lengths from Yosemite Valley. Bookmakers responded by making the colt ante-post favourite for the 2023 2000 Guineas. O'Brien commented Aidan O'Brien said: "He's always shown a lot... He's very uncomplicated, is happy to make the running, happy to take a lead. Ryan said he couldn't believe how well he was travelling two out and when he asked him the response was very quick... when they are giving you that kind of feel you would have to think he's a Guineas horse".

For his next appearance Little Big Bear was stepped up to Group 1 level to contest the Phoenix Stakes over six furlongs at the Curragh on 6 August and went off the 13/8 second choice in the betting behind the English-trained Bradsell (winner of the Coventry Stakes). The other three runners were Persian Force (July Stakes), Shartash (Railway Stakes and Apache Outlaw. Little Big Bear led from the start, repelled a challenge from Persian Force at the two furlong mark, and accelerated away from his opponents to win by seven lengths in "impressive" style. O'Brien commented "He looks a very special horse. We always thought from day one that he was something different. He's big, fast, strong, and uncomplicated. It was a very good race. The best of the 2-year-olds were there. Ryan was very complimentary about him. Little Big Bear has got a lot of options".

Little Big Bear had sustained a foot injury when he kicked a wall before the Phoenix Stakes and failed to recover in time for the National Stakes later that month. In September it was announced that he would not race again in 2022.

In the official two-year-old ratings for 2022, Little Big Bear was rated the best juvenile of the season in Europe, five pounds ahead of Blackbeard and Chaldean.

=== 2023: three-year-old season ===
On 6 May Little Big Bear returned from an absence of nine months to contest the 2000 Guineas over the Rowley Mile at Newmarket Racecourse on soft ground and started the 5/1 third favourite behind Auguste Rodin and Chaldean. Ridden by Wayne Lordan he pulled hard in the early stages before fading badly in the closing stages and finishing last of the fourteen runners. A veterinary report stated that he was lame in his right hind leg. O'Brien felt that having to fly his horses to England a day earlier than planned owing to security measures surrounding the Coronation of King Charles III had badly affected their chances. He commented "the whole thing was a bit of a non-event really. The travelling over is what it is". Three weeks after his run at Newmarket the colt was dropped back in distance for the Group 2 Sandy Lane Stakes at Haydock Park and started favourite ahead of six opponents headed by Cold Case (Pavilion Stakes) and Bradsell. With Frankie Dettori in the saddle, he tracked the leaders before taking the lead approaching the final furlong and won by 1 1/4 lengths from Shouldvebeenaring with a gap of eight lengths back to Bradsell in third place. After the race Dettori said "He looked magnificent today. I guess they had to try the Guineas, it was too long and it didn't work out, but he won in good style today. I always had the race covered, he quickened up well under hands and heels and it's a good confidence booster before the Commonwealth Cup."

At Royal Ascot, Little Big Bear started 10/11 favourite for the Group 1 Commonwealth Cup over six furlongs. Ridden by Moore, he went into the lead a furlong out but was passed by Shaquille, trained by Julie Comacho, in the final 110 yards. There was a rematch between the two horses in the July Cup at Newmarket, where they started joint favourites. Little Big Bear came last of the eight runners, 22 lengths behind winner Shaquille.

In August 2023 it was announced that Little Big Bear would be retired to stud due to a fracture on his right fore fetlock.

== Pedigree ==
Pedigree of Little Big Bear (IRE), bay colt, 2020
| Sire No Nay Never (USA) 2011 | Scat Daddy (USA); 2004 | Johannesburg | Hennessy |
| Sire No Nay Never (USA) 2011 | Scat Daddy (USA); 2004 | Johannesburg | Myth |
| Sire No Nay Never (USA) 2011 | Scat Daddy (USA); 2004 | Love Style | Mr Prospector |
| Sire No Nay Never (USA) 2011 | Scat Daddy (USA); 2004 | Love Style | Likeable Style |
| Sire No Nay Never (USA) 2011 | Cat's Eye Witness (USA); 2003 | Elusive Quality | Gone West |
| Sire No Nay Never (USA) 2011 | Cat's Eye Witness (USA); 2003 | Elusive Quality | Hopespringseternal |
| Sire No Nay Never (USA) 2011 | Cat's Eye Witness (USA); 2003 | Comical Cat | Exceller |
| Sire No Nay Never (USA) 2011 | Cat's Eye Witness (USA); 2003 | Comical Cat | Six Months Long |
| Dam Adventure Seeker (FR) 2008 | Bering (GB); 1983 | Arctic Tern (USA) | Sea-Bird (FR) |
| Dam Adventure Seeker (FR) 2008 | Bering (GB); 1983 | Arctic Tern (USA) | Bubbling Beauty |
| Dam Adventure Seeker (FR) 2008 | Bering (GB); 1983 | Beaune (FR) | Lyphard (USA) |
| Dam Adventure Seeker (FR) 2008 | Bering (GB); 1983 | Beaune (FR) | Barbra |
| Dam Adventure Seeker (FR) 2008 | American Adventure (USA); 2000 | Miswaki | Mr Prospector |
| Dam Adventure Seeker (FR) 2008 | American Adventure (USA); 2000 | Miswaki | Hopespringseternal |
| Dam Adventure Seeker (FR) 2008 | American Adventure (USA); 2000 | All Along (FR) | Targowice (USA) |
| Dam Adventure Seeker (FR) 2008 | American Adventure (USA); 2000 | All Along (FR) | Agujita (Family: 1-d) |
