= Blackbeard (horse) =

Irish Thoroughbred racehorse

- Sire: No Nay Never
- Grandsire: Scat Daddy
- Dam: Muirin
- Damsire: Born To Sea
- Sex: Colt
- Foaled: 6 February 2020
- Country: Ireland
- Colour: Bay
- Breeder: Newstead Breeding
- Owner: Michael Tabor, Derrick Smith, Sue Magnier & Westerberg
- Trainer: Aidan O'Brien
- Record: 8: 6-1-0
- Earnings: £470,842

Major wins
- First Flier Stakes (2022); Marble Hill Stakes (2022); Prix Robert Papin (2022); Prix Morny (2022); Middle Park Stakes (2022)

Awards
- Cartier Champion Two-year-old Colt (2022)

Blackbeard (foaled 6 February 2020) is an Irish-bred Thoroughbred racehorse. As a two-year-old in 2022 he was one of the best juvenile colts in Europe, winning six of his eight races including the Marble Hill Stakes, Prix Robert Papin, Prix Morny and Middle Park Stakes. He was then retired from racing to become a breeding stallion.

== Background ==
Blackbeard is a dark bay horse with no white markings bred in Ireland by Newstead Breeding. As a foal in November 2020 he was put up for auction at Tattersalls and was bought by the bloodstock agent Jamie McCalmont for 270,000 guineas. He raced in the ownership of the Coolmore partners Michael Tabor, Sue Magnier and Derrick Smith in association with Georg von Opel's Westerberg organisation. He was sent into training with Aidan O'Brien at Ballydoyle.

Blackbeard is from the fifth crop of foals sired by No Nay Never, an American horse who had his greatest success in Europe where he won the Norfolk Stakes and the Prix Morny as a juvenile in 2013. His other foals have included Ten Sovereigns and Alcohol Free. He was the first foal of his dam Muirin, who showed some racing ability as she won one minor races and finished fourth to Happily in the Moyglare Stud Stakes. She was a descendant of the British broodmare Tananarive, making her a distant relative of Mrs Penny and Hatoof.

== Racing career ==
=== 2022: two-year-old season ===
Blackbeard was ridden in all but one of his races by Ryan Moore. He began his racing career in a maiden race over five furlongs on the synthetic Polytrack surface at Dundalk Racecourse on 8 April when he started at the 15/8 second favourite in a five-runner field. He raced just behind the leaders before taking the lead approaching the final furlong and won "comfortably" by one and a half lengths from the favourite Alexis Zorba. The colt made his turf debut in the Listed First Flier stakes over the same distance on yielding ground at the Curragh on 2 May. Starting the 11/10 favourite against four opponents he tracked the leaders and caught the front-running Crispy Cat in the final strides to win by a head. Nineteen days later at the same track, the colt was stepped up in class and distance for the Group 3 Marble Hill Stakes over six furlongs and started the 5/2 second favourite behind the Ger Lyons-trained Tough Talk. In a change of tactics, he led from the start and accelerated away from his rivals in the closing stages to win by three and a half lengths in "impressive" style. After the race Aidan O'Brien said "We weren't exactly sure that he would get six, Ryan thought the last day that he would and obviously he got it very well. He relaxed very well and quickened very well, that's what you'd really love about him."

On 14 June Blackbeard was sent to England to contest the Group 2 Coventry Stakes over six furlongs at Royal Ascot, but despite starting favourite he never looked likely to win and came home fourth behind the British-trained colts Bradsell, Persian Force and Royal Scotsman, beaten three and three quarter lengths by the winner. Eleven days after his defeat at Ascot the colt started 5/6 favourite for the Group 2 Railway Stakes over the same distance at the Curragh. He became upset before the start but went to the front at half way only to be run down in the closing stages by the Johnny Murtagh-trained Shartash and beaten a head into second place. For his next start the colt was sent to France for the Group 2 Prix Robert Papin over 1200 metres at Chantilly Racecourse on 17 July when he was ridden by Ioritz Mendizabal and started favourite ahead of the Prix du Bois winner Belbek. Blackbeard set the early pace before being headed by Belbek at half way but regained the advantage 300 metres from the finish and drew away in the closing stages to win by three lengths from his stablemate The Antarctic. O'Brien commented "We're delighted with Blackbeard. He was a baby all the way along, and even though he was still babyish today, Ioritz was very impressed with him. He said that he was professional and won easily. With every run he's getting there—he's definitely progressing."

Blackbeard returned to France on 21 August for the Group 1 Prix Morny over 1200 metres at Deauville Racecourse. With Moore back in the saddle he started second choice in the betting behind Persian Force (winner of the July Stakes) in a five-runner field which also included The Antarctic (who had won the Prix de Cabourg since the Prix Robert Papin), The Riddler (Norfolk Stakes and the filly Manhattan Jungle. After disputing the lead with Manhattan Jungle for most of the early running he gained the advantage 400 metres from the finish and kept on well to win by half a length from Persian Force. After the race O'Brien said "We're very happy with him. He always feels like he has a little bit more, but Ryan was delighted with him. He's a proper fast, early, mature two-year-old - he jumps and takes loads of racing. Blackbeard's obviously very speed orientated, he might get further but he has a lot of speed."

On 24 September Blackbeard was one of eight colts to contest the Group 1 Middle Park Stakes over six furlongs at Newmarket Racecourse and went off the 100/30 second choice in the betting behind the Gimcrack Stakes runner-up Marshman while the other contenders included Persian Force, The Antarctic and Mischief Magic (Sirenia Stakes). Blackbeard was "unruly" before the start but settled well behind the leaders before moving up to take the lead from Persian Force inside the last quarter mile out. He stayed on well in the closing stages to win by two lengths from The Antarctic. O'Brien commented "He’s a character. There’s no badness in him but he doesn’t have a lot of patience. Some people don’t mind waiting, others like to get going and he does too. He can do whatever he wants – he’s a very important horse for us. He’s very fast and always very professional. He started off very early and has held his form very strong. I think he’s all about speed rather than a Guineas horse."

On 24 October it was announced that Blackbeard had sustained a training injury and had been retired from racing. O'Brien said "Blackbeard was a little off after exercise this morning. Unfortunately, when we had him x-rayed the radiographs showed a small chip in his right knee and a decision has been made to retire him. He’s a typical No Nay Never; strong, early maturing and very fast. He ran every month from April to September and improved and improved from one race to the next."

On 9 November Blackbeard was named Champion Two-year-old Colt at the Cartier Racing Awards. In the official two-year-old ratings for 2022, Blackbeard was rated the equal second-best juvenile of the season in Europe, five pounds behind the Phoenix Stakes winner Little Big Bear and level with the Dewhurst Stakes winner Chaldean.

== Stud career ==
Blackbeard began his career as a breeding stallion for the Coolmore Stud in 2023, standing at a fee of €25,000.

== Pedigree ==
Pedigree of Blackbeard (IRE), bay colt, 2020
Sire No Nay Never (USA) 2011	Scat Daddy (USA); 2004	Johannesburg	Hennessy
Sire No Nay Never (USA) 2011	Scat Daddy (USA); 2004	Johannesburg	Myth
Sire No Nay Never (USA) 2011	Scat Daddy (USA); 2004	Love Style	Mr Prospector
Sire No Nay Never (USA) 2011	Scat Daddy (USA); 2004	Love Style	Likeable Style
Sire No Nay Never (USA) 2011	Cat's Eye Witness (USA); 2003	Elusive Quality	Gone West
Sire No Nay Never (USA) 2011	Cat's Eye Witness (USA); 2003	Elusive Quality	Hopespringseternal
Sire No Nay Never (USA) 2011	Cat's Eye Witness (USA); 2003	Comical Cat	Exceller
Sire No Nay Never (USA) 2011	Cat's Eye Witness (USA); 2003	Comical Cat	Six Months Long
Dam Muirin (IRE) 2015	Born To Sea (IRE); 2009	Invincible Spirit	Green Desert (USA)
Dam Muirin (IRE) 2015	Born To Sea (IRE); 2009	Invincible Spirit	Rafha (GB)
Dam Muirin (IRE) 2015	Born To Sea (IRE); 2009	Urban Sea (USA)	Miswaki
Dam Muirin (IRE) 2015	Born To Sea (IRE); 2009	Urban Sea (USA)	Allegretta (GB)
Dam Muirin (IRE) 2015	Girouette (IRE); 2005	Pivotal (GB)	Polar Falcon (USA)
Dam Muirin (IRE) 2015	Girouette (IRE); 2005	Pivotal (GB)	Fearless Revival
Dam Muirin (IRE) 2015	Girouette (IRE); 2005	Vassiana (FR)	Anabaa (USA)
Dam Muirin (IRE) 2015	Girouette (IRE); 2005	Vassiana (FR)	Vassia (USA) (Family: 25)
