= Gleneagles (horse) =

Irish-bred Thoroughbred racehorse

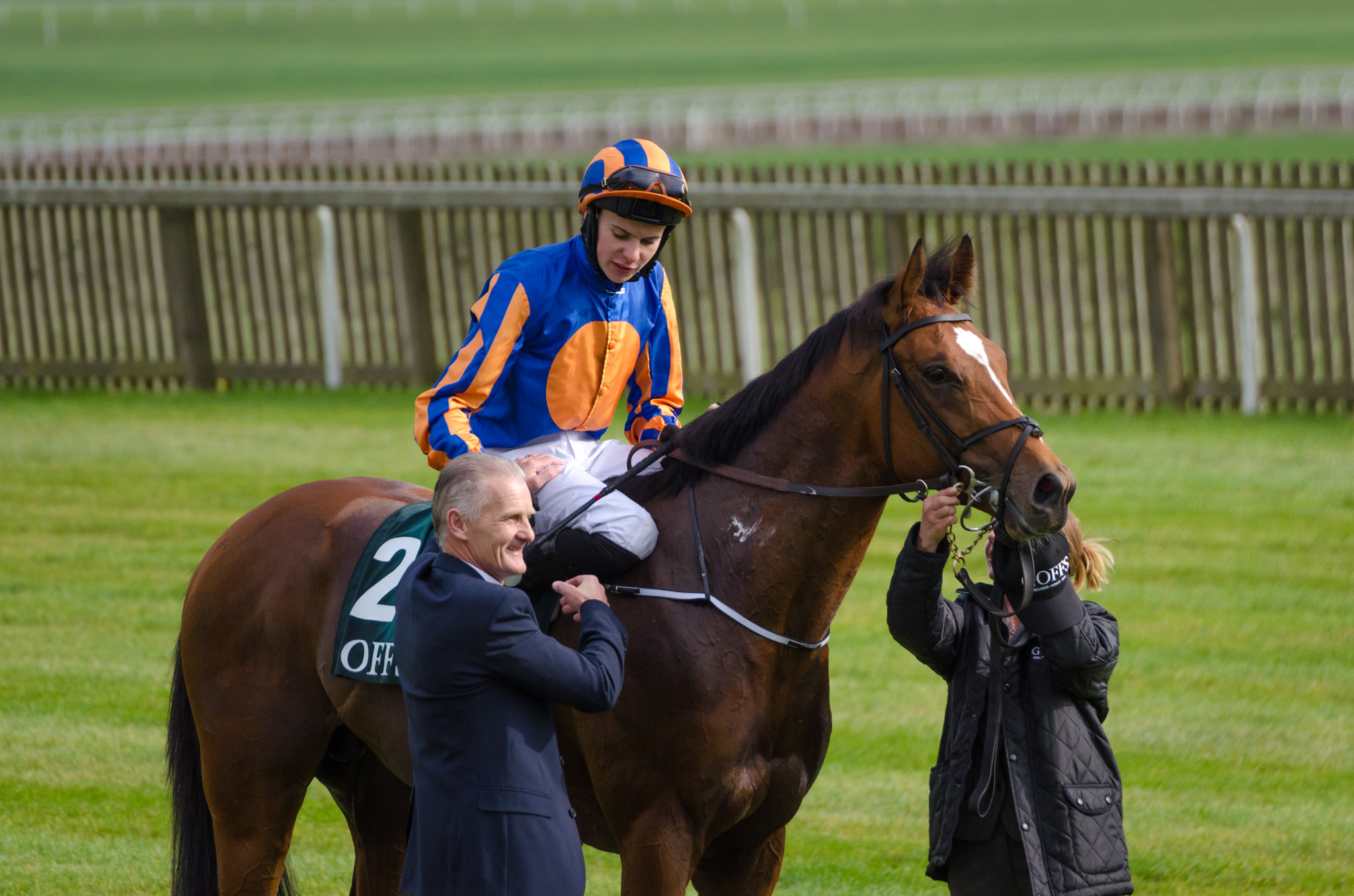
- Gleneagles at the Curragh after the National Stakes
- Sire: Galileo
- Grandsire: Sadler's Wells
- Dam: You'resothrilling
- Damsire: Storm Cat
- Sex: Colt
- Foaled: 12 January 2012
- Country: Ireland
- Colour: Bay
- Breeder: You'resothrilling Syndicate
- Owner: Michael Tabor, Susan Magnier & Derrick Smith
- Trainer: Aidan O'Brien
- Record: 10: 7-0-1
- Earnings: £934,200

Major wins
- Tyros Stakes (2014); Futurity Stakes (2014); National Stakes (2014); 2000 Guineas (2015); Irish 2,000 Guineas (2015); St James's Palace Stakes (2015)

Awards
- Cartier Champion Two-year-old Colt (2014)

Gleneagles (foaled 12 January 2012) is an Irish Thoroughbred racehorse. After finishing fourth on his debut, he finished first in his remaining five races as a two-year-old in 2014 and was named Cartier Champion Two-year-old Colt. He won the Tyros Stakes, Futurity Stakes and National Stakes in Ireland before being disqualified after crossing the line in first place in the Prix Jean-Luc Lagardère in France. On his three-year-old debut he won the 2000 Guineas and followed up in the Irish 2,000 Guineas three weeks later. In June he added a win in the St James's Palace Stakes at Royal Ascot.

== Background ==
Gleneagles is a bay colt with a white blaze and four white socks bred in Ireland by the You'resothrilling Syndicate. He was sired by Galileo, who won the Derby, Irish Derby and King George VI and Queen Elizabeth Stakes in 2001. Galileo is now one of the world's leading stallions and has been champion sire of Great Britain and Ireland five times. His other progeny include Cape Blanco, Frankel, Golden Lilac, Nathaniel, New Approach, Rip Van Winkle and Ruler of the World. Gleneagles' dam You'resothrilling, a daughter of Storm Cat was a sister of the leading racehorse and stallion Giant's Causeway. You'resothrilling was trained by Aidan O'Brien and won the Cherry Hinton Stakes in 2007. Gleneagles is her second foal, the first being the Irish 1,000 Guineas winner Marvellous.

During his racing career the colt has been trained by Aidan O'Brien at Ballydoyle. He is owned by John Magnier's Coolmore Stud partnership (officially Michael Tabor, Susan Magnier and Derrick Smith), usually racing in the blue and orange colours of Michael Tabor.

== Racing career ==
=== 2014: two-year-old season ===
Gleneagles made his first racecourse appearance at Leopardstown Racecourse on 6 June 2014 when he started 11/8 favourite for a maiden race over seven furlongs. Ridden by Colm O'Donoghue he raced behind the leaders and made little progress in the closing stages, finishing fourth of the ten runners three lengths behind the Ger Lyons-trained winner Convergence. Joseph O'Brien took over the ride when the colt contested a similar event over the same distance at the Curragh three weeks later. Starting favourite against ten opponents, he tracked the leaders before taking the lead approaching the final furlong and winning "comfortably" by two and a half lengths from Stevie's Wonder. On 24 July, over seven furlongs at Leopardown, Gleneagles met Convergence again in the Group Three Tyros Stakes, with the only other runner being the Dermot Weld-trained Tombelaine. O'Brien positioned the colt in third place before taking the lead a furlong out and winning by three-quarters of a length and a head from Tombelaine and Convergence. Aidan O'Brien said that the winner was "still babyish" and would "improve a good bit". One month later, Gleneagles started 8/13 favourite for the Group Two Futurity Stakes, over seven furlongs at the Curragh. He raced in fourth before moving up on the inside to take the lead a furlong and a half from the finish, went two lengths clear of his opponents, and held the late challenge of Vert de Greece to win by three-quarters of a length.

On 14 September, Gleneagles was moved up to Group One class for Ireland's most prestigious two-year-old race, the National Stakes over seven furlongs at the Curragh. He was made the 1/3 favourite ahead of the Acomb Stakes winner Dutch Connection. He has restrained by Joseph O'Brien at the rear of the five runner field before making progress on the outside in the last quarter mile. He took the lead a furlong out and extended his advantage to win by one and a half lengths from the Godolphin representative Toscanini, with Dutch Connection a length away in third place. After the race Joseph O'Brien said "He's a lovely horse. He has got plenty of pace and he was very relaxed today." For his final appearance of the season, the colt was sent to France to contest the Prix Jean-Luc Lagardère at Longchamp Racecourse on 5 October. He started the 9/4 second favourite behind the British-trained The Wow Signal, winner of the Coventry Stakes and the Prix Morny. The best of the French runners appeared to be Full Mast, the Criquette Head-trained winner of the Prix La Rochette. Gleneagles raced at the rear of the field before making progress in the straight and accelerating to take the lead 200 metres from the finish and winning by half a length and a short neck from Full Mast and Territories. In the closing stages, however, he had edged to the right, hampering the second and third-placed finishers and, following an enquiry by the racecourse stewards, he was disqualified and placed third. Commenting of the decision, Michael Tabor said "rules are rules. I'm not complaining".

=== 2015: three-year-old season ===
Gleneagles had been well-fancied for the 2000 Guineas throughout the winter, but heavy support in the betting market during March 2015 saw him elevated to clear favouritism for the classic. On 2 May Gleneagles, ridden by Ryan Moore, started favourite for the 207th running of the 2000 Guineas over the Rowley Mile course at Newmarket. His seventeen opponents included Territories (second favourite after winning the Prix de Fontainebleau), Ol' Man River (Beresford Stakes), Estidhkaar (Champagne Stakes), Ivawood (Richmond Stakes), Kool Kompany (Prix Robert Papin, Craven Stakes) and Home of the Brave (European Free Handicap). The field split into two groups across the wide course, with Gleneagles being restrained by Moore towards the middle of the group on the stands side. He made a forward move in the last quarter mile, took the lead approaching the final furlong and quickly went clear to win by two and a quarter lengths from Territories, with Ivawood taking third ahead of the 50/1 outsider Bossy Guest. O'Brien, who was winning the race for the seventh time said "He's a great traveller and has a lot of speed. He was always very good and quickens very well. Ryan said they couldn't lead him and he ended up getting there early. The big thing about him is pace – he's always shown it". The Irish 2,000 Guineas and the St James's Palace Stakes were suggested as future targets.

On 23 May Gleneagles started 2/5 favourite for the Irish 2000 Guineas at the Curragh. Ivawood was again in opposition along with Belardo, the top-rated European two-year-old of 2014. Ivawood set the pace and led the field into the straight as Moore restrained Gleneagles towards the rear of the eleven-runner field. With two furlongs to run, Moore struggled to find a clear run, but Gleneagles quickened well to overtake Ivawood in the closing stages and won by three-quarters of a length from Endless Drama with Ivawood third and Belardo fourth. After the race Moore reported that the slow ground had "just blunted his pace a bit. He didn't have a lot of room, but he had the gears and the class to go through. He put his head down and fought well at the end". O'Brien made it clear that he regarded Gleneagles as primarily a miler, but he was left among the entries for the Epsom Derby before being withdrawn five days before the race.

Gleneagles reappeared at Royal Ascot on 16 June when he was matched against the Poule d'Essai des Poulains winner Make Believe in the St James's Palace Stakes at Royal Ascot. Starting the 8/15 favourite in five runner field, he was restrained by Moore before moving forward on the outside as Consort led the field into the straight. He took the lead a furlong out and drew away to win by two and a half lengths from Latharnach and Consort. Following the colt's victory, O'Brien described him as "the best in the yard at the minute and the best miler we've ever had". Gleneagles was scheduled to face the French champion Solow in the Sussex Stakes in July, but was withdrawn from the race owing to the soft ground. Plans to run the colt in the International Stakes and then the Irish Champion Stakes were also abandoned when the ground proved unsuitable.

Gleneagles eventually reappeared after a four-month absence in the Queen Elizabeth II Stakes at Ascot on 17 October. He started the 9/4 second favourite but never looked likely to win and finished sixth of the nine runners behind Solow. After the race O'Brien admitted that he had been very dubious about running the colt, saying "If I had the chance again I wouldn't have run him and I would have waited like last time... We had an eye on the Breeders' Cup Classic and if he was to go there he needed to run so we took a chance... We'll have to take him home and see how he is over the next couple of days". The horse shipped to the United States to compete for the first time on a dirt track, and drew the number 5 post with morning line odds of 20/1 for the Breeders' Cup Classic. He finished last of the eight runners, 25 lengths behind the winner American Pharoah.

== Assessment and awards ==
In November 2014, Gleneagles was named Champion Two-year-old Colt at the Cartier Racing Awards. In the official International Classification for 2014, Gleneagles was given a rating of 116, three pounds behind the top-rated Belardo.

== Stud record ==
At the end of his racing career, Gleneagles was retired to become a breeding stallion at the Coolmore Stud.

=== Notable progeny ===
Gleneagles Group One winners:

c = colt, f = filly, g = gelding

| Foaled | Name | Sex | Major Wins |
| 2017 | Highland Chief | c | Man o' War Stakes |
| 2018 | Loving Dream | f | Prix de Royallieu |
| 2020 | Mill Stream | c | July Cup |
| 2021 | Calandagan | g | Grand Prix de Saint-Cloud (twice), King George VI and Queen Elizabeth Stakes, Champion Stakes, Japan Cup, Dubai Sheema Classic |
| 2021 | Palladium | c | Deutsches Derby |
| 2021 | Arrow Eagle | c | Prix Royal-Oak |

== Pedigree ==
Pedigree of Gleneagles, bay colt, 2012
| Sire Galileo (IRE) b. 1998 | Sadler's Wells (USA) b. 1981 | Northern Dancer* b. 1961 | Nearctic |
| Sire Galileo (IRE) b. 1998 | Sadler's Wells (USA) b. 1981 | Northern Dancer* b. 1961 | Natalma |
| Sire Galileo (IRE) b. 1998 | Sadler's Wells (USA) b. 1981 | Fairy Bridge b. 1975 | Bold Reason |
| Sire Galileo (IRE) b. 1998 | Sadler's Wells (USA) b. 1981 | Fairy Bridge b. 1975 | Special |
| Sire Galileo (IRE) b. 1998 | Urban Sea (USA) ch. 1989 | Miswaki ch. 1978 | Mr. Prospector |
| Sire Galileo (IRE) b. 1998 | Urban Sea (USA) ch. 1989 | Miswaki ch. 1978 | Hopespringseternal |
| Sire Galileo (IRE) b. 1998 | Urban Sea (USA) ch. 1989 | Allegretta ch. 1978 | Lombard |
| Sire Galileo (IRE) b. 1998 | Urban Sea (USA) ch. 1989 | Allegretta ch. 1978 | Anatevka |
| Dam You'resothrilling (USA) b. 2005 | Storm Cat (USA) b. 1983 | Storm Bird b. 1978 | Northern Dancer* |
| Dam You'resothrilling (USA) b. 2005 | Storm Cat (USA) b. 1983 | Storm Bird b. 1978 | South Ocean |
| Dam You'resothrilling (USA) b. 2005 | Storm Cat (USA) b. 1983 | Terlingua ch. 1976 | Secretariat |
| Dam You'resothrilling (USA) b. 2005 | Storm Cat (USA) b. 1983 | Terlingua ch. 1976 | Crimson Saint |
| Dam You'resothrilling (USA) b. 2005 | Mariah's Storm (USA) b. 1991 | Rahy ch. 1985 | Blushing Groom |
| Dam You'resothrilling (USA) b. 2005 | Mariah's Storm (USA) b. 1991 | Rahy ch. 1985 | Glorious Song |
| Dam You'resothrilling (USA) b. 2005 | Mariah's Storm (USA) b. 1991 | Immense b. 1979 | Roberto |
| Dam You'resothrilling (USA) b. 2005 | Mariah's Storm (USA) b. 1991 | Immense b. 1979 | Imsodear (Family 11) |

Note: b. = Bay, br. = Brown, ch. = Chestnut

* Gleneagles is inbred 3 x 4 to the stallion Northern Dancer, meaning that Northern Dancer appears once in the third generation and once in the fourth generation of his pedigree.
