= Hold That Tiger (horse) =

American-bred Thoroughbred racehorse

- Racing silks of Michael Tabor
- Sire: Storm Cat
- Grandsire: Storm Bird
- Dam: Beware of the Cat
- Damsire: Caveat
- Sex: Stallion
- Foaled: 25 February 2000
- Country: United States
- Colour: Chestnut
- Breeder: Ten Broek Farm
- Owner: Michael Tabor
- Trainer: Aidan O'Brien
- Record: 10: 3-1-1
- Earnings: £409,859

Major wins
- Railway Stakes (2002); Grand Critérium (2002)

Awards
- European Champion Two-Year-Old (2002)
- Last updated on June 21, 2007

Hold That Tiger (foaled 25 February 2000) is a retired Thoroughbred racehorse and active sire who was bred in the United States and trained in Ireland. He is best known for winning the 2002 Prix Jean-Luc Lagardère and being named European Champion Two-Year-Old at the Cartier Racing Awards.

== Background ==
Hold That Tiger, is a dark-coated "liver" chestnut, bred in Kentucky by Ten Broeck Farm Inc. He was sired by the two-time American Champion sire Storm Cat out of Beware of the Cat, making him a half-brother to the Belmont Stakes winner Editor's Note and a close relative of the Hopeful Stakes winner Hennessy. He was sent as a weanling to the Keeneland November Sale where he was sold for $1,100,000 to the Irish bloodstock agent Dermot "Demi" O'Byrne, acting on behalf of Michael Tabor. He was sent to Ireland and went into training with Aidan O'Brien at Ballydoyle.

== Racing career ==
=== 2002:two-year-old season ===
Hold That Tiger began his career in June 2002 by winning a maiden race at Leopardstown by two lengths as 6-4 favourite. He was immediately moved up to Group race class in the Railway Stakes at the Curragh two weeks later, where he defeated the Coventry Stakes runner-up Pakhoes by a neck. Immediately after the race he was offered at odds of 14-1 for the following year's 2000 Guineas.

In August there was an outbreak of coughing amongst the Ballydoyle horses, but Hold That Tiger was nevertheless made 11-10 favourite for the Group One Phoenix Stakes, only to finish last of the nine runners, showing clear signs of "respiratory distress". He took time to recover and did not reappear for almost two months.

At Longchamp on Arc day Hold That Tiger was part of a four-horse O'Brien entry in the Grand Critérium (since renamed the Prix Jean-Luc Lagardère). He started slowly and entered the straight last of the fourteen runners, but then moved to the outside and accelerated past the entire field to win by half a length from the previously undefeated Italian colt Le Vie Dei Colori, with the future Eclipse Award winner Intercontinental in third. It was a performance that was compared by one commentator to that of Dancing Brave in the 1986 Arc.

Although Hold That Tiger, who by now was regarded as the best of O'Brien's many good two-year-old colts, was entered in the Racing Post Trophy, his trainer had more ambitious plans. On his final start of the year, Hold That Tiger traveled to Arlington Park, Chicago to challenge for the Breeders' Cup Juvenile, a race which O'Brien had won a year previously with Johannesburg. He broke slowly again and spent most of the race towards the back of the field, but then moved up quickly on the outside and stayed on to take third place behind Vindication. O'Brien observed that, "he flew home and could be a (Kentucky) Derby horse."

=== 2003:three-year-old season ===
In early spring, O'Brien did seem to be considering a bid for the Kentucky Derby, but Hold That Tiger was instead sent straight for the 2,000 Guineas at Newmarket, for which he was made 4-1 favourite. He made no show, finishing seventeenth of the twenty runners behind Refuse To Bend. At Royal Ascot he finished fourth in the St. James's Palace Stakes, but had excuses, having been unable to find space for a clear run when travelling well. He was well beaten behind Falbrav in the Eclipse Stakes before being campaigned again in North America.

In September at Belmont Park he produced his best performance of the year by finishing second to the American Horse of the Year Mineshaft in the Woodward Stakes. His jockey, Edgar Prado was impressed, saying that "he wins the Woodward any other year". Hold That Tiger was retired after finishing fifth of the ten runners behind Pleasantly Perfect in the Breeders' Cup Classic.

== Race record ==
Date	Race	Dist (f)	Course	Class	Prize (£K)	Odds	Runners	Placing	Margin	Time	Jockey	Trainer
12 June 2002	EBF Maiden	6	Leopardstown	M	7	6/4	9	1	2	1:20.40	Michael Kinane	Aidan O'Brien
30 June 2002	Railway Stakes	6	The Curragh	3	39	5/4	4	1	Neck	1:17.00	Michael Kinane	Aidan O'Brien
11 August 2002	Phoenix Stakes	6	The Curragh	1	104	11/10	9	9	11	1:15.10	Michael Kinane	Aidan O'Brien
6 October 2002	Grand Critérium	7	Longchamp	1	122	7/2	14	1	0.5	1:20.10	Kieren Fallon	Aidan O'Brien
26 October 2002	Breeders' Cup Juvenile	9	Arlington Park	1	381	11/2	14	3	5	1:49.61	Kieren Fallon	Aidan O'Brien
3 May 2003	2,000 Guineas	8	Newmarket- Rowley Mile	1	185	4/1	20	17	10.5	1:37.98	Michael Kinane	Aidan O'Brien
17 June 2003	St. James's Palace Stakes	8	Ascot	1	156	9/1	11	4	4.5	1:39.92	Kieren Fallon	Aidan O'Brien
3 July 2003	Eclipse Stakes	10	Sandown Park	1	214	10/1	15	9	6.5	2:05.59	Michael Kinane	Aidan O'Brien
6 September 2003	Woodward Stakes	9	Belmont Park	1	187	17/2	5	2	4.25	1:46.21	Edgar Prado	Aidan O'Brien
25 October 2003	Breeders' Cup Classic	10	Santa Anita Park	1	1300	5/1	10	5	7.5	1:59.88	Edgar Prado	Aidan O'Brien

== Assessment ==
Although he was named Champion Two-Year-Old Colt in the Cartier Racing Awards, Hold That Tiger was rated at 117 in the 2002 International Classification, making him only the seventh best colt of the year.

He was more highly regarded in North America, where his rating of 119 placed him fourth in the Experimental Free Handicap.

At three he was rated at 115 by the International Classification.

== Stud career ==
Hold That Tiger first stood as a stallion at the Ashford Stud in Kentucky before being sold to the Swettenham Stud in 2010. He now operates as a "shuttle" stallion, standing at the Haras de la Haie Neuve in France for the first part of the year, before transferring to the Swettenham Stud's base in Nagambie, Victoria for the Southern Hemisphere breeding season. He has had some success as a stallion, notably as the sire of the Eclipse Award nominee Smiling Tiger.

== Pedigree ==
Pedigree of Hold That Tiger (USA), chestnut stallion, 2000
Sire Storm Cat (USA) 1983	Storm Bird	Northern Dancer	Nearctic
Sire Storm Cat (USA) 1983	Storm Bird	Northern Dancer	Natalma
Sire Storm Cat (USA) 1983	Storm Bird	South Ocean	New Providence
Sire Storm Cat (USA) 1983	Storm Bird	South Ocean	Shining Sun
Sire Storm Cat (USA) 1983	Terlingua; 1976	Secretariat	Bold Ruler
Sire Storm Cat (USA) 1983	Terlingua; 1976	Secretariat	Somethingroyal
Sire Storm Cat (USA) 1983	Terlingua; 1976	Crimson Saint	Crimson Satan
Sire Storm Cat (USA) 1983	Terlingua; 1976	Crimson Saint	Bolero Rose
Dam Beware of the Cat (USA) 1986	Caveat; 1980	Cannonade	Bold Bidder
Dam Beware of the Cat (USA) 1986	Caveat; 1980	Cannonade	Queen Sucree
Dam Beware of the Cat (USA) 1986	Caveat; 1980	Cold Hearted	The Axe
Dam Beware of the Cat (USA) 1986	Caveat; 1980	Cold Hearted	Turn To North
Dam Beware of the Cat (USA) 1986	T. C. Kitten; 1969	Tom Cat	Tom Fool
Dam Beware of the Cat (USA) 1986	T. C. Kitten; 1969	Tom Cat	Jazz Baby
Dam Beware of the Cat (USA) 1986	T. C. Kitten; 1969	Needlebug	Needles
Dam Beware of the Cat (USA) 1986	T. C. Kitten; 1969	Needlebug	Flynet (Family: 8-c)
