= Ballycorus Stakes =

Flat horse race in Ireland

- Class: Group 3
- Location: Leopardstown; County Dublin, Ireland
- Race type: Flat / Thoroughbred
- Website: Leopardstown

Race information
- Distance: 7f (1,408 metres)
- Surface: Turf
- Track: Left-handed
- Qualification: Three-years-old and up
- Weight: 9 st 1 lb (3yo); 9 st 11 lb (4yo+); Allowances; 3 lb for fillies and mares Penalties; 5 lb for G1 / G2 winners * 3 lb for G3 winners * * since 1 July last year
- Purse: €50,000 (2021); 1st: €29,500

Ballycorus Stakes
2026
Native Warrior	Audience	Redemption Road

Previous years
2025
Copacabana Sands	Easy	Zodiac Bear
2024
Mutasarref	Special Wan	Bright Stripes
2023
Ocean Jewel	Real Appeal	Carrytheone
2022
Dr Zempf	Straight Answer	Pretreville
2021
Real Appeal	Lord Of The Lodge	Pearls Galore

2020-2011
2020
Speak In Colours	Surrounding	Gustavus Weston
2019
Flight Risk	Inverleigh	Gordon Lord Byron
2018
True Valour	Smash Williams	Ardhoomey
2017
Flight Risk	Don't Touch	Psychedelic Funk
2016
Dick Whittington	Al Mohalhal	Dont Bother Me
2015
Convergence	Tested	Sovereign Debt
2014
Wannabe Better	Eastern Rules	Brendan Brackan
2013
Leitir Mor	Lily's Angel	Yellow Rosebud
2012
Alanza	Marvada	Glor Na Mara
2011
Bewitched	Zoffany	Glor Na Mara

2010-2001
2010
Six of Hearts	Duff	Croisultan
2009
Duff	Dohasa	Georgebernardshaw
2008
Summit Surge	Great War Eagle	Prince Shaun
2007
Lord Admiral	Modeeroch	Eastern Appeal
2006
An Tadh	Lord Admiral	Misu Bond
2005
Democratic Deficit	Zarad	Simple Exchange
2004
Naahy	Hamairi	Latino Magic
2003
Abunawwas	One More Round	Miss Emma
2002
Rum Charger	One Won One	Final Exam
2001
King Charlemagne	One Won One	Social Harmony

2000-1991
2000
Tumbleweed Ridge	Bashkir	Poco A Poco
1999
Tumbleweed Ridge	Dane River	Two-Twenty-Two
1998
Tumbleweed Ridge	Wizard King	Poker-B
1997
Wizard King	Cool Edge	Crown Regent
1996
Idris	Burden Of Proof	Projection
1995
Desert Style	Mistle Cat	The Puzzler
1994
Wandering Thoughts	Heart Lake	Pre-Eminent
1993
Kayfa	Dark Reef	Master Tribe
1992
Pre-Eminent	Poolesta	Miznah
1991
Additional Risk	Anne De Beaujeu	Lepoushka

1990-1988
1990
Norwich	Takwim	Kyra
1989
Milieu	Run To Jenny	Blasted Heath
1988
Cipriani	Golden Temple	Noora Abu

The Ballycorus Stakes is a Group 3 flat horse race in Ireland open to thoroughbreds aged three years or older. It is run at Leopardstown over a distance of 7 furlongs (1,408 metres), and it is scheduled to take place each year in mid June.

The event was restricted to three-year-old fillies in 1977, and its present format was introduced the following year. For a period it was classed at Listed level, and it was promoted to Group 3 status in 1995.

== Records ==
Most successful horse since 1977 (3 wins):

- Tumbleweed Ridge – 1998, 1999, 2000

Leading jockey since 1977 (8 wins):

- Michael Kinane – Seasonal Pickup (1985), Innsbruck (1986), Cipriani (1988), Milieu (1989), Additional Risk (1991), Pre-Eminent (1992), King Charlemagne (2001), Lord Admiral (2007)

Leading trainer since 1977 (9 wins):

- Dermot Weld – Gayshuka (1977), Hot Princess (1983), Seasonal Pickup (1985), Innsbruck (1986), Cipriani (1988), Milieu (1989), Additional Risk (1991), Pre-Eminent (1992), Rum Charger (2002)

== Winners since 1977 ==
Year	Winner	Age	Jockey	Trainer	Time
1977	Gayshuka	3	Wally Swinburn	Dermot Weld
1978	Jack Hylton	3	Gabriel Curran	Kevin Prendergast
1979	Spence Bay	4	Tony Murray	Seamus McGrath
1980	Muscovite	3	Tommy Murphy	Vincent O'Brien
1981	Tellurano	3	Gabriel Curran	Kevin Prendergast
1982	Memento	3	Pat Eddery	Vincent O'Brien
1983	Hot Princess	3	J. Deegan	Dermot Weld
1984	Klarifi	3	Dermot Hogan	John Oxx
1985	Seasonal Pickup	4	Michael Kinane	Dermot Weld
1986	Innsbruck	3	Michael Kinane	Dermot Weld	1:29.70
1987	Noora Abu	5	Kevin Manning	Jim Bolger	1:28.00
1988	Cipriani	4	Michael Kinane	Dermot Weld	1:28.02
1989	Milieu	4	Michael Kinane	Dermot Weld	1:25.50
1990	Norwich	3	Ron Quinton	Barry Hills	1:26.00
1991	Additional Risk	3	Michael Kinane	Dermot Weld	1:27.40
1992	Pre-Eminent	5	Michael Kinane	Dermot Weld	1:29.40
1993	Kayfa	4	Paul Carberry	Noel Meade	1:28.50
1994	Wandering Thoughts	5	Christy Roche	Aidan O'Brien	1:33.30
1995	Desert Style	3	Kevin Manning	Jim Bolger	1:29.60
1996	Idris	6	Kevin Manning	Jim Bolger	1:30.90
1997	Wizard King	6	George Duffield	Sir Mark Prescott	1:34.10
1998	Tumbleweed Ridge	5	Michael Tebbutt	Brian Meehan	1:35.40
1999	Tumbleweed Ridge	6	Michael Tebbutt	Brian Meehan	1:31.50
2000	Tumbleweed Ridge	7	Michael Tebbutt	Brian Meehan	1:30.40
2001	King Charlemagne	3	Michael Kinane	Aidan O'Brien	1:30.70
2002	Rum Charger	3	Pat Smullen	Dermot Weld	1:34.90
2003	Abunawwas	3	Declan McDonogh	Kevin Prendergast	1:29.60
2004	Naahy	4	Sam Hitchcott	Mick Channon	1:25.90
2005	Democratic Deficit	3	Kevin Manning	Jim Bolger	1:29.70
2006	An Tadh	3	Johnny Murtagh	Ger Lyons	1:29.00
2007	Lord Admiral	6	Michael Kinane	Charles O'Brien	1:26.35
2008	Summit Surge	4	Keagan Latham	Ger Lyons	1:26.49
2009	Duff	6	Fran Berry	Edward Lynam	1:26.37
2010	Six of Hearts	6	Davy Moran	Cecil Ross	1:28.29
2011	Bewitched	4	Johnny Murtagh	Charles O'Brien	1:30.55
2012	Alanza	4	Johnny Murtagh	John Oxx	1:30.30
2013	Leitir Mor	3	Kevin Manning	Jim Bolger	1:31.68
2014	Wannabe Better	4	Wayne Lordan	Tommy Stack	1:25.43
2015	Convergence	3	Gary Carroll	Ger Lyons	1:31.19
2016	Dick Whittington	4	Seamie Heffernan	Aidan O'Brien	1:32.92
2017	Flight Risk	6	Kevin Manning	Jim Bolger	1:28.31
2018	True Valour	4	Chris Hayes	Johnny Murtagh	1:30.74
2019	Flight Risk	8	Kevin Manning	Jim Bolger	1:31.43
2020	Speak In Colours (Note: The 2020 race was run at Fairyhouse in July due to the COVID-19 pandemic in the Republic of Ireland)	5	Shane Crosse	Joseph O'Brien	1:30.49
2021	Real Appeal	4	Shane Foley	Jessica Harrington	1:25.67
2022	Dr Zempf	3	Colin Keane	Ger Lyons	1:30.33
2023	Ocean Jewel	3	Billy Lee	Willie McCreery	1:30.10
2024	Mutasarref	6	Colin Keane	Ger Lyons	1:33.01
2025	Copacabana Sands	3	Wayne Lordan	Michael O'Callaghan	1:34.64
2026	Native Warrior	5	James Doyle	Karl Burke	1:35.03

== See also ==
- Horse racing in Ireland
- List of Irish flat horse races
