= 2015 2000 Guineas Stakes =

- 2000 Guineas Stakes
- Racing colours of the winner
- Location: Newmarket Racecourse
- Date: 2 May 2015
- Winning horse: Gleneagles
- Starting price: 4/1 fav
- Jockey: Ryan Moore
- Trainer: Aidan O'Brien
- Owner: Michael Tabor, Susan Magnier & Derrick Smith
- Conditions: Good to firm

The 2015 2000 Guineas Stakes was the 207th running of the 2000 Guineas Stakes horse race. It was run over one mile at Newmarket Racecourse on 2 May 2015. With the favourite going off at 4/1, this was the most open renewal since 2007 where Adagio headed the field at the same price. Most of the winter ante-post market leaders met the starter at Newmarket - notable absentees being Faydhan, who disappointed in the Free Handicap, and Highland Reel who was diverted to France.

== Race details ==
- Sponsor: QIPCO
- Winner's prize money: £282,841
- Going: Good to Firm
- Number of runners: 18
- Winner's time: 1 minute, 37.55 seconds

== Full result ==
	Dist *	Horse	Jockey	Trainer	SP
1		Gleneagles	Ryan Moore	Aidan O'Brien	4/1 fav
2	2¼	Territories	Mickael Barzalona	André Fabre	5/1
3	¾	Ivawood	Richard Hughes	Richard Hannon, Sr.	10/1
4	½	Bossy Guest	Charles Bishop	Mick Channon	50/1
5	2	Celestial Path	Luke Morris	Sir Mark Prescott	14/1
6	1½	Home Of The Brave	James Doyle	Hugo Palmer	25/1
7	¾	Dutch Connection	William Buick	Charles Hills	25/1
8	shd	Moheet	Frankie Dettori	Richard Hannon, Sr.	20/1
9	nse	Ride Like The Wind	Maxime Guyon	Freddy Head	20/1
10	¾	See Me Now	Daniel Tudhope	David O'Meara	100/1
11	½	Cappella Sansevero	Andrea Atzeni	Ger Lyons	40/1
12	1	Code Red	Martin Dwyer	William Muir	100/1
13	½	Kool Kompany	Pat Dobbs	Richard Hannon, Sr.	20/1
14	1½	Estidhkaar	Paul Hanagan	Richard Hannon, Sr.	6/1
15	1	Intilaaq	Dane O'Neill	Roger Varian	8/1
16	1	Room Key	Jimmy Fortune (jockey)	Eve Johnson Houghton	100/1
17	6	Glenalmond	Kieren Fallon	Karl Burke	66/1
18	27	Ol' Man River	Joseph O'Brien	Aidan O'Brien	100/1

* The distances between the horses are shown in lengths or shorter – nk = neck

== Winner details ==
Further details of the winner, Gleneagles:

- Foaled: 12 January 2012, in Ireland
- Sire: Galileo; Dam: You'resothrilling (Storm Cat)
- Owner: Michael Tabor, Susan Magnier & Derrick Smith
- Breeder: Aidan O'Brien

== Form analysis ==
=== Two-year-old races ===
Notable runs by the future 2000 Guineas participants as two-year-olds in 2014:

- Cappella Sansevero - 1st Marble Hill Stakes, 2nd Coventry Stakes, 3rd Phoenix Stakes, 1st Round Tower Stakes
- Celestial Path - 3rd Racing Post Trophy
- Code Red - 1st Scott Dobson Memorial Doncaster Stakes
- Dutch Connection - 1st Acomb Stakes, 3rd Vincent O'Brien National Stakes
- Estidhkaar - 1st Superlative Stakes, 1st Champagne Stakes
- Gleneagles - 1st Tyros Stakes, 1st Futurity Stakes, 1stVincent O'Brien National Stakes, 1st (placed 3rd) Prix Jean-Luc Lagardère
- Home Of The Brave - 3rd Sirenia Stakes
- Ivawood - 1st July Stakes, 1st Richmond Stakes, 2nd Middle Park Stakes
- Kool Kompany - 1st Rochestown Stakes, 1st Railway Stakes, 1st Prix Robert Papin, 2nd Phoenix Stakes
- Ol' Man River - 1st Beresford Stakes
- Room Key - 3rd Vintage Stakes
- Territories - 3rd Prix La Rochette, 2nd Prix Jean-Luc Lagardère

=== The road to Newmarket ===
Early-season appearances in 2013, prior to running in the 2000 Guineas:

- Estidhkaar - 2nd Greenham Stakes
- Home Of The Brave - 1st European Free Handicap
- Ivawood - 3rd Greenham Stakes
- Kool Kompany - 1st Craven Stakes
- Moheet - 3rd Craven Stakes
- Ride Like The Wind - 1st Prix Djebel
- Territories - 1st Prix de Fontainebleau

=== Subsequent Group 1 wins ===
Group 1 / Grade I victories after running in the 2000 Guineas:

- Gleneagles - Irish 2,000 Guineas (2015), St James's Palace Stakes (2015)
- Territories - Prix Jean Prat (2015)

== Subsequent breeding careers ==
Leading progeny of participants in the 2015 2000 Guineas Stakes.

Gleneagles (1st) - Royal Dornoch (1st Royal Lodge Stakes 2019), Royal Lytham - (1st July Stakes 2019)
Ivawood (3rd) - Chares (1st Criterium de Lyon 2019)
Territories (2nd) - Minor flat winners
Estidhkaar (14th) - Minor flat winners
Ol' Man River (18th) - Offspring yet to race
Kool Kompany (13th) - Exported to Spain
