= Chaldean (horse) =

British Thoroughbred racehorse

- Sire: Frankel
- Grandsire: Galileo
- Dam: Suelita
- Damsire: Dutch Art
- Sex: Colt
- Foaled: 10 May 2020
- Country: United Kingdom
- Colour: Chestnut
- Breeder: Whitsbury Manor Stud
- Owner: Juddmonte
- Trainer: Andrew Balding
- Record: 10: 5-1-0
- Earnings: £882,327

Major wins
- Acomb Stakes (2022); Champagne Stakes (2022); Dewhurst Stakes (2022); 2000 Guineas (2023)

Chaldean (foaled 10 May 2020) is a British Thoroughbred racehorse. He was the leading British-trained two-year-old of 2022 when he won his last four races including the Acomb Stakes, Champagne Stakes and Dewhurst Stakes. In 2023 he won the 2000 Guineas.

== Background ==
Chaldean is a chestnut colt with a white blaze and two white socks bred in England, by the Hampshire-based Whitsbury Manor Stud. As a foal he was consigned to the Tatttersalls sale in December 2020 and was bought for 550,000 guineas by Juddmonte. Juddmonte's racing manager Barry Mahon later said "We’d buy less than 10 horses a year, so it’s a very small percentage of our business. But when we see something that looks nice and can enhance our stable, the family are keen to add to it." The colt was sent into training with Andrew Balding at Kingsclere.

Chaldean was from the seventh crop of foals sired by Frankel, an undefeated racehorse whose other progeny have included Cracksman, Adayar, Soul Stirring and Hurricane Lane. His dam Suelita showed some racing ability, winning four races in Italy and was already a successful broodmare, producing the Mill Reef Stakes winner Alkumait. She was a descendant of Ahead, a half sister to Markofdistinction and a female-line relative of Dr Devious and Dancing Rain.

== Racing career ==
=== 2022: two-year-old season ===
Chaldean began his racing career in a novice race over six furlongs on good ground at Newbury Racecourse on 30 June when he started the 100/30 joint favourite and finished fifth of the thiriteen runners behind Seductive Power, beaten three and a half lengths by the winner. Two weeks later at the same track he started 3/1 second favourite for a similar event over seven furlongs at the same track and recorded his first success. Ridden as on his debut by David Probert he took the lead approaching the last quarter mile and "kept on well" to win by three quarters of a length from Seeking Gold. The colt was then stepped up in class for the Group 3 Acomb Stakes at York Racecourse in August and started the 7/2 second choice in the betting. With Ryan Moore in the saddle he went to the front early in the straight and held off the challenge of the Irish-trained Indestructible to win by half a length. Barry Mahon commented "He’s very straightforward and he’s done it well – he was gutsy... He’s quite a young horse, being a middle of May foal, and I’d imagine he’s quite a bit more developing and growing to do, so we won’t over-race him this year."

In September Chaldean was moved up in class again for the Champagne Stakes, a Group 2 event over seven furlongs on soft ground at Doncaster Racecourse. Ridden by the first time by the veteran Frankie Dettori, who became his regular jockey, he started 2/1 second choice behind the Solario Stakes winner Silver Knott, with Indestructible completing the three-runner field. He took the lead from the start, opened up a clear advantage approaching the final furlong and won "comfortably" by three and a half lengths. After the race Andrew Balding said: "Good horse, good ride. He's stepped up every time and he's got a fantastic attitude. I think he goes on any ground... You’ve got to mind these horses, but Frankie was very much of the opinion that he should be running in the Dewhurst."

On 8 October at Newmarket Racecourse Chaldean contested the Group 1 Dewhurst Stakes and started 5/2 joint-favourite with the Somerville Tattersall Stakes winner Nostrum in a seven-runner field which also included Naval Power (Ascendant Stakes), Aesop's Fables (Futurity Stakes), Royal Scotsman (Richmond Stakes), Isaac Shelby (Superlative Stakes) and Marbaan (Vintage Stakes). Chaldean recovered from a slow start to take the lead after a furlong and maintained his advantage throughout the race, holding off a strong late challenge from Royal Scotsman to prevail by a head. Balding commented "This horse has been very smart from early on. We thought he was really good in the spring and early summer. He got beaten first time out, but since then he’s gone on and on and actually he’s got less smart at home as he’s got smarter on the racecourse, which is just how you want it really. He keeps finding and he’s an absolute star. I’m thrilled."

In the official two-year-old ratings for 2022, Chaldean was rated the equal second-best juvenile of the season in Europe, five pounds behind the Phoenix Stakes winner Little Big Bear and level with the Middle Park Stakes winner Blackbeard.

=== 2023: three-year-old season ===
Chaldean began his second campaign on 22 April when he started the 5/4 favourite for the Greenham Stakes at Newbury but had no chance to make any meaningful contribution to the race. Streets of Gold, who had been drawn alongside him, veered to the left at the start, bumping the favourite and causing Dettori to fall from the saddle. The race was won by Isaac Shelby, with Chaldean galloping the full distance unaccompanied by his jockey. After the race Balding commented "It was one of those unfortunate things, but I'm happy the horse seems fine and I hope Frankie is as well. We don't normally bash into other horses at home".

On 6 May Chaldean was one of fourteen colts to contest the 215th running of the 2000 Guineas over the Rowley Mile course at Newmarket and started the 7/2 second choice in the betting behind the Vertem Futurity Trophy winner Auguste Rodin, while the other contenders included Little Big Bear, Royal Scotsman, Indestructible, Silver Knott, Noble Style (Gimcrack Stakes), Sakheer (Mill Reef Stakes) and Dubai Mile (Criterium de Saint-Cloud). Racing down the centre of the wide Newmarket course Chaldean settled just behind the leaders before overtaking the front-running 150/1 outsider Hi Royal a furlong from the finish. He never looked in danger thereafter and won by one an three quarter lengths with Fankie Dettori waving his whip in celebration as he crossed the line. Dettori, who had announced that he would be retiring at the end of the season commented "Am I dreaming? It's so surreal and feels like a dream. Emotionally, to win my last 2,000 Guineas, it's amazing."

== Stud career ==
Chaldean was retired to stud at Banstead Manor Stud in the United Kingdom. In 2024 Chaldean commenced duty as a shuttle stallion at Cambridge Stud in New Zealand for a service fee of NZ$35,000.

== Pedigree ==
Pedigree of Chaldean (GB), chestnut colt, 2020
Sire Frankel (GB) 2008	Galileo (IRE); 1998	Sadler's Wells (USA)	Northern Dancer (CAN)
Sire Frankel (GB) 2008	Galileo (IRE); 1998	Sadler's Wells (USA)	Fairy Bridge
Sire Frankel (GB) 2008	Galileo (IRE); 1998	Urban Sea (USA)	Miswaki
Sire Frankel (GB) 2008	Galileo (IRE); 1998	Urban Sea (USA)	Allegretta (GB)
Sire Frankel (GB) 2008	Kind (IRE); 2001	Danehill (USA)	Danzig
Sire Frankel (GB) 2008	Kind (IRE); 2001	Danehill (USA)	Razyana
Sire Frankel (GB) 2008	Kind (IRE); 2001	Rainbow Lake (GB)	Rainbow Quest (USA)
Sire Frankel (GB) 2008	Kind (IRE); 2001	Rainbow Lake (GB)	Rockfest (USA)
Dam Suelita (GB) 2009	Dutch Art (GB); 2004	Medicean	Machiavellian (USA)
Dam Suelita (GB) 2009	Dutch Art (GB); 2004	Medicean	Mystic Goddess (USA)
Dam Suelita (GB) 2009	Dutch Art (GB); 2004	Halland Park Lass (IRE)	Spectrum
Dam Suelita (GB) 2009	Dutch Art (GB); 2004	Halland Park Lass (IRE)	Palacegate Episode
Dam Suelita (GB) 2009	Venoge (IRE); 2004	Green Desert (USA)	Danzig
Dam Suelita (GB) 2009	Venoge (IRE); 2004	Green Desert (USA)	Foreign Courier
Dam Suelita (GB) 2009	Venoge (IRE); 2004	Horatia	Machiavellian (USA)
Dam Suelita (GB) 2009	Venoge (IRE); 2004	Horatia	Ahead (Family: 1-t)
