= Dick Whittington (horse) =

Irish-bred Thoroughbred racehorse

- Sire: Rip Van Winkle
- Grandsire: Galileo
- Dam: Sahara Sky
- Damsire: Danehill
- Sex: Stallion
- Foaled: 25 February 2012
- Country: Ireland
- Colour: Bay
- Breeder: Swordlestown Stud
- Owner: Derrick Smith, Susan Magnier & Michael Tabor
- Trainer: Aidan O'Brien
- Record: 12: 4-2-2
- Earnings: £193,054

Major wins
- Anglesey Stakes (2014); Phoenix Stakes (2014); Ballycorus Stakes (2016)

Dick Whittington (foaled 25 February 2012) is an Irish Thoroughbred racehorse and sire. He showed his best form as a two-year-old in 2014 when he won three of his six races including the Anglesey Stakes and Phoenix Stakes. After finishing fourth on his only appearance of 2015 he returned as a four-year-old to win the Ballycorus Stakes.

== Background ==
Dick Whittington is a bay horse with a small white star bred in Ireland by the County Kildare-based Swordlestown Stud. As a foal he was put up for auction at the Goffs Premier Foal & Breeding Stock Sale and sold for €55,000 to the Camas Park Stud. In the following October the colt was offered for sale at the Goffs Orby Yearling Sale and was bought for €280,000 by McAlmont Bloodstock. He entered the ownership of the Coolmore organisation and was sent into training with Aidan O'Brien at Ballydoyle. During his track career he was officially owned in partnership by Derrick Smith, Susan Magnier & Michael Tabor.

He was sired by Rip Van Winkle who won the Sussex Stakes, Queen Elizabeth II Stakes and International Stakes. Rip Van Winkle's other progeny have included The Happy Prince (Renaissance Stakes), Higher Power (Northumberland Plate) and Creggs Pipes (Lanwades Stud Stakes). Dick Whittington's dam Sahara Sky was an unraced half-sister to the sprinter Owington. Her dam, Old Domesday Book a great-granddaughter of Samanda, an influential broodmare whose descendants have included Ouija Board, Teleprompter and Ibn Bey.

== Racing career ==
=== 2014: two-year-old season ===
As a juvenile, Dick Whittington was ridden in all of his races by his trainer's son Joseph O'Brien. The colt made his debut in the Fishery Lane Race over six furlongs at Naas Racecourse on 14 May and started at odds of 11/4 in a six-runner field. After being unable to obtain a clear run at a crucial stage he finished strongly but failed by a head to catch the favourite Cappella Sansevero. The colt was dropped back to maiden class at the Curragh eleven days later but despite starting the 2//7 favourite he was beaten into second place by the Jim Bolger-trained outsider Intense Style. On 14 June at Navan Racecourse he started odds-on favourite for a maiden race and recorded his first success as he took the lead a furlong out and drew away to win "comfortably" by four and a half lengths from Dandyleekie.

One week after his win at Navan Dick Whittington was sent to England to contest the Chesham Stakes at Royal Ascot. He started the 15/8 favourite against thirteen opponents but finished third behind Richard Pankhurst and Toscanini. On 19 July Dick Whittington and Toscanini started the 2/1 joint-favourites for the Group 3 Anglesey Stakes at the Curragh, with the best of the other three runners appearing to be the filly Newsletter (third in the Queen Mary Stakes). After racing in third place Dick Whittington stayed on strongly to take the lead inside the final furlong and won by half a length from Toscanini. After the race Aidan O'Brien said "He's a fast horse. Five or six furlongs looks his trip. I think it would be tight to get a mile with him. I'm delighted and we'll look at something like the Phoenix Stakes with him".

On 10 August at the Curragh, Dick Whittington, as predicted, was stepped up to the highest class for the Group 1 Phoenix Stakes and was made the 6/1 third choice in the betting behind the British challenger Kool Kompany (Railway Stakes, Prix Robert Papin) and the filly Beach Belle (Fillies' Sprint Stakes). The other three runners were Cappella Sansevero, I Am Beautiful (Grangecon Stud Stakes) and the maiden Kasbah. I Am Beautiful set the pace with Dick Whittington settling in fourth place before making a forward move approaching the last quarter mile. After overcoming some interference the colt produced a strong late run to win by half a length and a short head from Kool Kompany and Cappella Sansevero. Aidan O'Brien, who was winning the race for the 13th time commented He's a tough, hardy horse. We weren't sure before today if he would get a mile or not but after that you would think he will. He's had a busy enough time for a young horse so we won't be in any panic with him now. He's had a tough race there and we'll give him a little break".

=== 2015: three-year-old season ===
Dick Whittington began his second campaign in the Greenham Stakes (a trial race for the 2000 Guineas) over seven furlongs at Newbury Racecourse. Ridden by Ryan Moore he started at odds of 8/1 and finished fourth of the nine runners behind Muhaarar. The colt then had training problems and did not race again in 2015.

=== 2016: four-year-old season ===
After an absence of almost a year Dick Whittington returned in April 2016 and came home sixth behind Onenightidreamed in the Gladness Stakes over seven furlongs at the Curragh. In May he ran seventh to Magical Memory in the Duke of York Stakes but then produced a much better effort ten days later when he finished a close third behind Mobsta and Flight Risk in the Greenlands Stakes. On 16 June, with Seamie Heffernan in the saddle, the colt contested the Group 3 Ballycorus Stakes over seven furlongs at Leopardstown Racecourse and started the 7/4 second favourite behind the eight-year-old gelding Kelinni (winner of the Lexus Stakes in Australia). Heffernan tracked the clear leader Al Mohalhal before sending his mount into the lead a furlong out. Dick Whittington quickly pulled away and recorded his first win in 22 months as he came home two and three quarter lengths clear of his rivals. A month later the colt started joint-favourite for the Minstrel Stakes at the Curragh but finished seventh of the nine runners behind Gordon Lord Byron.

In October 2016 Dick Whittington was consigned to the Tattersalls Autumn Horses-in-Training Sale and was bought for 150,000 guineas by the trainer Luke Comer.

== Pedigree ==
Pedigree of Dick Whittington (IRE), bay stallion, 2012
Sire Rip Van Winkle (IRE) 2006	Galileo (IRE); 1998	Sadler's Wells	Northern Dancer
Sire Rip Van Winkle (IRE) 2006	Galileo (IRE); 1998	Sadler's Wells	Fairy Bridge
Sire Rip Van Winkle (IRE) 2006	Galileo (IRE); 1998	Urban Sea	Miswaki
Sire Rip Van Winkle (IRE) 2006	Galileo (IRE); 1998	Urban Sea	Allegretta
Sire Rip Van Winkle (IRE) 2006	Looking Back (IRE); 2001	Stravinsky	Nureyev
Sire Rip Van Winkle (IRE) 2006	Looking Back (IRE); 2001	Stravinsky	Fire the Groom
Sire Rip Van Winkle (IRE) 2006	Looking Back (IRE); 2001	Mustique Dream	Don't Forget Me
Sire Rip Van Winkle (IRE) 2006	Looking Back (IRE); 2001	Mustique Dream	Jamaican Punch
Dam Sahara Sky (IRE) 2004	Danehill (USA); 1986	Danzig	Northern Dancer
Dam Sahara Sky (IRE) 2004	Danehill (USA); 1986	Danzig	Pas de Nom
Dam Sahara Sky (IRE) 2004	Danehill (USA); 1986	Razyana	His Majesty
Dam Sahara Sky (IRE) 2004	Danehill (USA); 1986	Razyana	Spring Adieu
Dam Sahara Sky (IRE) 2004	Old Domesday Book (GB); 1983	High Top	Derring-Do
Dam Sahara Sky (IRE) 2004	Old Domesday Book (GB); 1983	High Top	Camenae
Dam Sahara Sky (IRE) 2004	Old Domesday Book (GB); 1983	Broken Record	Busted
Dam Sahara Sky (IRE) 2004	Old Domesday Book (GB); 1983	Broken Record	Sam's Song (Family: 12-b)

- Dick Whittington is inbred 4 × 4 to Northern Dancer, meaning that this stallion appears twice in the fourth generation of his pedigree.
