= One Cool Cat =

American-bred Thoroughbred racehorse

- Sire: Storm Cat
- Grandsire: Storm Bird
- Dam: Tacha
- Damsire: Mr. Prospector
- Sex: Stallion
- Foaled: 2001
- Country: United States
- Colour: Bay
- Breeder: Winstar Farm
- Owner: Sue Magnier and Michael Tabor
- Trainer: Aidan O'Brien
- Record: 10: 5-0-1
- Earnings: £325,492

Major wins
- Anglesey Stakes (2003); Phoenix Stakes (2003); National Stakes (2003); Phoenix Sprint Stakes (2004)

Awards
- Cartier Champion Two-year-old Colt (2003)

One Cool Cat, (foaled 26 March 2001) was an American-bred, Irish-trained Thoroughbred racehorse and sire.

== Background ==
One Cool Cat was a bay horse bred in Kentucky by Winstar Farm. He was sired by Storm Cat out of the Mr. Prospector mare, Tacha. At the 2002 Keeneland Sales he was purchased by Demi O'Byrne for $3.1-million on behalf of John Magnier's Coolmore organization. During his racing career he was owned by Sue Magnier and Michael Tabor and was trained at Ballydoyle by Aidan O'Brien.

== Racing career ==
=== 2003: two-year-old season ===
One Cool Cat lost on his debut start, finishing 4th in a maiden race at the Curragh. He was soon on the winning trail with a victory in a maiden race at York Racecourse six weeks later. The Anglesey Stakes was his next race and was the second in a string of four consecutive wins, following up in the Phoenix Stakes and National Stakes. Aidan O'Brien had been so impressed with his work at home and also on the racetrack that he joked, "I think I'll move him in beside me and knock a door in the bedroom to put him up for the winter!"

For his performances in the 2003 racing season, One Cool Cat was named Cartier Champion Two-year-old Colt.

=== 2004: three-year-old season ===
One Cool Cat was sent off favourite for the 2,000 Guineas with new stable jockey Jamie Spencer on board. However, he never struck a blow and finished 13th of 14, over 51 lengths behind the winner Haafhd. It was found afterwards that he had an irregular heartbeat, the likely reason for his poor showing. He was sent out in a Group 3 at the Curragh ten weeks later, odds-on favourite, but again he never threatened over a mile, and finished 5th, 6 lengths behind the winner.

A return to 6 furlongs was victorious as One Cool Cat beat The Kiddykid by a length in the Group 3 Phoenix Sprint Stakes, again at the Curragh, at the start of August. Eleven days later, he started as favourite for the Group 1 Nunthorpe Stakes at York Racecourse, finishing 3rd. The Group 1 Haydock Sprint Cup was next on the agenda 2 weeks later, where he finished 6th, 3 lengths behind winner Tante Rose.

== Stud record ==
One Cool Cat is the Sire to Cool spur out of Flying high (aka Johnny) who was retired from racing and has gone on to being a super star show jumper. One cool cat was retired from racing to become a breeding stallion at Coolmore Stud in County Tipperary, at a fee of €15,000. His first foals were in 2006.

He also stood at Cambridge Stud in New Zealand from 2005 to 2009.

It was reported in the Racing Post in November 2009 that One Cool Cat had been sold to stand at stud in South Korea.
