= Anglesey Stakes =

Flat horse race in Ireland

- Class: Group 3
- Location: Curragh Racecourse; County Kildare, Ireland
- Inaugurated: 1829
- Race type: Flat / Thoroughbred
- Sponsor: Jebel Ali Stables
- Website: Curragh

Race information
- Distance: 6f 63y (1,265 metres)
- Surface: Turf
- Track: Straight
- Qualification: Two-year-olds
- Weight: 9 st 3 lb Allowances; 3 lb for fillies Penalties; 5 lb for Group 2 winners 3 lb for Group 3 winners
- Purse: €51,700 (2022); 1st: €32,450

Anglesey Stakes
2026
Ballinea Star	Immortal Guard	Confucius

Previous years
2025
Suzie Songs	Flushing Meadows	Stop The Nation
2024
Babouche	Camille Pissarro	California Dreamer
2023
Kairyu	Pearls And Rubies	Do It With Style
2022
Little Big Bear	Yosemite Valley	Badb
2021
Beauty Inspire	Andreas Vesalius	Hadman

2020-2011
2020
A Case Of You	Lipizzaner	Giuliana
2019
Roman Turbo	Lil Grey	Soul Search
2018
Marie's Diamond	Viadera	Just Wonderful
2017
Actress	Theobald	Brother Bear
2016
Peace Envoy	Psychedelic Funk	Mirdif
2015
Final Frontier	Miss Katie Mae	Queen Of Sicily
2014
Dick Whittington	Toscanini	Rapid Applause
2013
Wilshire Boulevard	Oklahoma City	Mansion House
2012
Grafelli	Hard Yards	Count Of Limonade
2011
Fire Lily	After	Boris Grigoriev

2010-2001
2010
Dunboyne Express	Samuel Morse	Rudolf Valentino
2009
Walk On Bye	King Ledley	Beethoven
2008
Bushranger	Westphalia	Kamado
2007
Myboycharlie	Tuscan Evening	Chun Tosaigh
2006
Regional Counsel	Sadeek	Chivalrous
2005
Amigoni	Black Charmer	Zato
2004
Oratorio	Cougar Cat	Indesatchel
2003
One Cool Cat	Leicester Square	Mokabra
2002
Ontario	Spartacus	Benicio
2001
Johannesburg	Wiseman's Ferry	High Society

2000-1991
2000
Industrial Pride	Pirate Of Penzance	Berlin
1999
Rossini	Still Going On	Touch Of Innocence
1998
Namid	Coralita	Flip The Switch
1997
Lady Alexander	King Of Kings	Princely Heir
1996
Air Of Distinction	Sharemono	Quws
1995
Woodborough	Lidanna	Harghar
1994
Smart Guest	Beating The Buzz	High Charger
1993
Keraka	Luzarches	Averti
1992
Basim	Up And At 'Em	El Zorro Dorado
1991
St Jovite	El Prado	Parisian Teddy

1990-1988
1990
Malvernico	Approach The Bench	Portrait Painter
1989
Single Combat	Tenderetta	Absolutely Perfect
1988
Corwyn Bay	Lone Runner	Ghilan

The Anglesey Stakes is a Group 3 flat horse race in Ireland open to two-year-old thoroughbreds. It is run at the Curragh over a distance of 6 furlongs and 63 yards (1,265 metres), and it is scheduled to take place each year in July.

== History ==
The event was established in 1829, and it was originally contested over 6 furlongs. It was extended by 63 yards in 1897. The race became known as the Anglesey Plate in 1948. It reverted to the title Anglesey Stakes in 1958. It was given Group 3 status in 1971.

The Anglesey Stakes was formerly held in late August or early September. It was switched to July in 1997. It is currently staged during the Irish Oaks meeting.

== Records ==
Leading jockey since 1960 (5 wins):

- Michael Kinane – Keraka (1993), Rossini (1999), Johannesburg (2001), Ontario (2002), One Cool Cat (2003)

Leading trainer since 1960 (13 wins):

- Vincent O'Brien – Philemon (1962), Bravery (1965), Nijinsky (1969), Headlamp (1970), Roberto (1971), Saritamer (1973), Niebo (1975), Solinus (1977), Storm Bird (1980), Caerleon (1982), Law Society (1984), Woodman (1985), Lake Como (1987)

== Winners since 1976 ==
Year	Winner	Jockey	Trainer	Time
1976	Readjust	Denis Letherby	Paddy Prendergast, Jr.
1977	Solinus	Tommy Murphy	Vincent O'Brien
1978	Dickens Hill	Wally Swinburn	Mick O'Toole
1979	Snapper Point	Tony Murray	Adrian Maxwell
1980	Storm Bird	Tommy Murphy	Vincent O'Brien	1:20.70
1981	Dara Monarch	Mark Dwyer	Liam Browne
1982	Caerleon	Pat Eddery	Vincent O'Brien	1:18.80
1983	Gala Event	Kevin Moses	Ted Curtin
1984	Law Society	Pat Eddery	Vincent O'Brien	1:18.20
1985	Woodman	Pat Eddery	Vincent O'Brien	1:19.30
1986	Island Reef (Note: Darcy's Thatcher finished first in 1986, but he was demoted following a stewards' inquiry)	Kevin Moses	Kevin Prendergast
1987	Lake Como	Cash Asmussen	Vincent O'Brien	1:17.80
1988	Corwyn Bay	Stephen Craine	Tommy Stack	1:19.20
1989	Single Combat	Stephen Craine	Tommy Stack	1:17.30
1990	Malvernico	Christy Roche	Jim Bolger	1:15.60
1991	St Jovite	Christy Roche	Jim Bolger	1:15.40
1992	Basim	Christy Roche	Jim Bolger	1:18.60
1993	Keraka	Michael Kinane	John Oxx	1:18.60
1994	Smart Guest	Michael Fenton	Michael Bell	1:19.80
1995	Woodborough	John Reid	Peter Chapple-Hyam	1:15.00
1996	Air of Distinction	Seamie Heffernan	Aidan O'Brien	1:18.00
1997	Lady Alexander	Pat Shanahan	Con Collins	1:15.10
1998	Namid	Johnny Murtagh	John Oxx	1:19.30
1999	Rossini	Michael Kinane	Aidan O'Brien	1:16.60
2000	Pan Jammer (Note: The 2000 winner Pan Jammer was later exported to Hong Kong and renamed Industrial Pride)	Johnny Murtagh	Mick Channon	1:17.50
2001	Johannesburg	Michael Kinane	Aidan O'Brien	1:16.80
2002	Ontario	Michael Kinane	Aidan O'Brien	1:20.70
2003	One Cool Cat	Michael Kinane	Aidan O'Brien	1:17.80
2004	Oratorio	Seamie Heffernan	Aidan O'Brien	1:15.70
2005	Amigoni	Kieren Fallon	Aidan O'Brien	1:15.50
2006	Regional Counsel	Declan McDonogh	Kevin Prendergast	1:16.80
2007	Myboycharlie	Wayne Lordan	Tommy Stack	1:21.73
2008	Bushranger	Wayne Lordan	David Wachman	1:17.60
2009	Walk on Bye	Wayne Lordan	Tommy Stack	1:20.82
2010	Dunboyne Express (Note: The 2010 winner Dunboyne Express subsequently raced in Hong Kong as Dan Excel)	Declan McDonogh	Kevin Prendergast	1:18.97
2011	Fire Lily	Wayne Lordan	David Wachman	1:15.81
2012	Grafelli	Kevin Manning	Jim Bolger	1:21.74
2013	Wilshire Boulevard	Seamie Heffernan	Aidan O'Brien	1:15.78
2014	Dick Whittington	Joseph O'Brien	Aidan O'Brien	1:15.33
2015	Final Frontier	Shane Foley	Jessica Harrington	1:17.02
2016	Peace Envoy	Ryan Moore	Aidan O'Brien	1:17.13
2017	Actress	Seamie Heffernan	Aidan O'Brien	1:14.26
2018	Marie's Diamond	James Doyle	Mark Johnston	1:15.27
2019	Roman Turbo	Ronan Whelan	Michael Halford	1:16.79
2020	A Case of You (Note: The 2020 race took place in October due to the COVID-19 pandemic in the Republic of Ireland)	Gary Carroll	John McConnell	1:22.14
2021	Beauty Inspire	Colin Keane	Ger Lyons	1:18.33
2022	Little Big Bear	Ryan Moore	Aidan O'Brien	1:17.82
2023	Kairyu	Colin Keane	Michael O'Callaghan	1:20.64
2024	Babouche	Colin Keane	Ger Lyons	1:15.69
2025	Suzie Songs	Colin Keane	Ger Lyons	1:15.52
2026	Ballinea Star	Donagh O'Connor	Robson De Aguiar	1:17.36

== Earlier winners ==
- 1829: Regulator
- 1830: Philip the First
- 1831: Kildare
- 1832: New Fashion
- 1833: Whitefoot
- 1834: Whim
- 1835: Wedge
- 1836: Magpie
- 1837: Permit
- 1838: Wirrestrew
- 1839: Johnny
- 1840: Wheel
- 1841: Ballinkeele
- 1842: Condor
- 1843: Loadstone
- 1844: Pickpocket
- 1845: Mermaid
- 1846: Horn of Chase
- 1847: Justice to Ireland
- 1848: Chatterer
- 1849: Queen Margaret
- 1850: The Marquis
- 1851: Indian Warrior
- 1852: The Deformed
- 1853: Tom
- 1854: Cockatoo
- 1855: Citron
- 1856: Queencake
- 1857: Zaidee
- 1858: Fingal
- 1859: Busy Bee
- 1860: Bombardier
- 1861: Troublesome
- 1862: Roman Bee
- 1863: Blarney
- 1864: It's Curious
- 1865: Owen Roe
- 1866: Dora
- 1867: Uncas
- 1868: Melody
- 1869: Adeline
- 1870: Amnesty
- 1871: Shelmartin
- 1872: Queen of the Bees
- 1873: Lady Patricia
- 1874: Wild Duck
- 1875: Princess Bon Bon
- 1876: Second Sight
- 1877: Cimaroon
- 1878: Soulouque
- 1879: Sibyl
- 1880: Master Ned
- 1881: The Jilt
- 1882: Donnycarney
- 1883: Melianthus
- 1884: Magic
- 1885: Mellifont
- 1886: Kildare
- 1887: Philomel
- 1888: St Kieran
- 1889: Killowen
- 1890: The Rhymer
- 1891: Christabel
- 1892: Loot
- 1893: Delphos
- 1894: Instability
- 1895: Rinvanny
- 1896: Diabolo
- 1897: Sirenia
- 1898: Eulogy
- 1899: Steinort
- 1900: Corncrake
- 1901: Meldhre
- 1902: Fariman
- 1903: Jean's Folly
- 1904: Cherry Lass
- 1905: Merry Moment
- 1906: Knight of Tully
- 1907: Temeraire
- 1908: Roland Lee
- 1909: Trepida
- 1910: Velociter
- 1911: Amsterdam
- 1912: Laoghaire
- 1913: Mellifont
- 1914: no race
- 1915: Ayn Hali
- 1916: General Villa
- 1917: Elfterion
- 1918: Grand Parade
- 1919: Tenroh
- 1920: Russian Sable
- 1921: Vesta
- 1922: French Briar
- 1923: Artoy
- 1924: White Spot
- 1925: Ardsallagh
- 1926: Polecat
- 1927: Athford
- 1928: Trigo
- 1929: Ballyferis
- 1930: Soliped
- 1931: Centeno
- 1932: Black Wings
- 1933: Starford
- 1934: Smokeless
- 1935: Grangemore
- 1936: Owenstown
- 1937: On Edge
- 1938: Rose of Portugal
- 1939: Eyrefield
- 1940: Rose Garland
- 1941: Terrible Times
- 1942: Up Hill
- 1943: Arctic Sun
- 1944: Mafosta
- 1945: Silver Thistle
- 1946: Grand Weather
- 1947: The Web
- 1948: Ballywillwill
- 1949: First View
- 1950: Clare Hill
- 1951: Engulfed
- 1952: Blue Label
- 1953: Sixpence
- 1954: Flying Story
- 1955: Dumpty Humpty
- 1956: No Complaint
- 1957: Daffodil
- 1958: Sauchrie
- 1959: Arctic Sea
- 1960: Indian Conquest
- 1961: Richmond
- 1962: Philemon
- 1963: Dromoland
- 1964: Green Banner
- 1965: Bravery
- 1966: Archangel Gabriel
- 1967: Society
- 1968: Marcia Royal
- 1969: Nijinsky
- 1970: Headlamp
- 1971: Roberto
- 1972: Tekoah
- 1973: Saritamer
- 1974: Mark Anthony
- 1975: Niebo

== See also ==
- Horse racing in Ireland
- List of Irish flat horse races
