= Windsor Castle Stakes =

Flat horse race in Britain

- Class: Listed
- Location: Ascot Racecourse; Ascot, England
- Race type: Flat / Thoroughbred
- Website: Ascot

Race information
- Distance: 5f (1,006 metres)
- Surface: Turf
- Track: Straight
- Qualification: Two-year-olds
- Weight: 9 st 3 lb Allowances; 5 lb for fillies
- Purse: £40,000 (2020); 1st: £23,680

Windsor Castle Stakes
2026
King Of Cloughan	Moonrise	Harlequin Sky

Previous years
2025
Havana Hurricane	Dickensian	Rogue Legend
2024
Ain't Nobody	Gabaldon	Aviation Time
2023
Big Evs	Johannes Brahms	Inquisitively
2022
Little Big Bear	Rocket Rodney	Eddie's Boy
2021
Chipotle	Dig Two	Boonie

2020-2011
2020
Tactical	Yazaman	Muker
2019
Southern Hills	Platinum Star	Glasvegas
2018
Soldier's Call	Sabre	Dom Carlos
2017
Sound And Silence	Roussel	James Garfield
2016
Ardad	Savannah's Dream	Pedestal
2015
Washington Dc	Areen	Steady Pace
2014
Hootenanny	Union Rose	Mubtaghaa
2013
Extortionist	Supplicant	Anticipated
2012
Hototo	Alhebayeb	Dylanbaru
2011
Frederick Engels	Stonefield Flyer	Caspar Netscher

2010-2001
2010
Marine Commando	Petronius Maximus	Excello
2009
Strike The Tiger	Fratellino	Di Stefano
2008
Flashmans Papers	Bushranger	Mullionmileanhour
2007
Drawnfromthepast	Kingsgate Native	Hatta Fort
2006
Elhamri	Conquest	The Old Fella
2005
Titus Alone	Strike Up The Band	Tabaret
2004
Chateau Istana	Tournedos	Safari Sunset
2003
Holborn	Vienna's Boy	Howick Falls
2002
Revenue	One Last Time	Progressing Times
2001
Irony	Steaming Home	Leggy Lou

2000-1991
2000
Autumnal	Give Back Calais	Zietunzeen
1999
Kalindi	Master Fay	Brave Burt
1998
Flanders	Sarson	Saphire
1997
Asfurah	Cortachy Castle	Aurigny
1996
Dazzle	Vax Star	Olympic Spirit
1995
Kuantan	Applaud	Polaris Flight
1994
Che Sara Sara	Raah Algharb	Tea Service
1993
Great Deeds	Bid For Blue	Imperial Bailiwick
1992
Satank	Surprise Offer	Colyan
1991
Isdar	Festive Cheer	Diamond Mine

1990-1988
1990
Gipsy Fiddler	Snowy Owl	Ivory Bride
1989
Pharaoh's Delight	Addison's Blade	La Galerie
1988
Barrys Gamble	Pastoral Jem	Hafir
1984
Sea Falcon	Durham Place	Miami Count

The Windsor Castle Stakes is a Listed flat horse race in Great Britain open to two-year-old horses. It is run over a distance of 5 furlongs (1,003 metres) at Ascot as part of the Royal Ascot meeting in June. It is currently run on the second day of the five-day meeting. From 2026 the Windsor Castle Stakes will be run over 6 furlongs and restricted to horses whose sire won over 7 furlongs or more as a two-year-old, or 8 furlongs or more as a three-year-old or older.

== Winners since 1900 ==
Year	Winner	Jockey	Trainer	Time
1900	Volodyovski	Thomas Weldon	John Huggins
1901	Henry of Naverre filly	Lester Reiff	John Huggins	1:13.60
1902	St Serf colt	Danny Maher	Richard Marsh	1:17.40
1903	Huntly	Mornington Cannon	Richard Marsh
1904	Chain Stitch	Herbert Jones	Richard Marsh
1905	Golden Table	Billy Higgs	Jack Robinson
1906	Bellavista	Otto Madden	Tom Waugh
1907	Monitor	George Stern	In France
1908	Genny	Bernard Dillon	Peter Gilpin
1909	Charles O'Malley	George Stern	Lewis
1910	Borrow	Skeets Martin	Andrew Joyner
1911	Charmian	Danny Maher	Percy Peck
1912	Early Girl	William Saxby	Captain Robert Dewhurst
1913	Lady of Song	Steve Donoghue	Atty Persse	1:02.60
1914	Tingvalla	Henri Jelliss	Tom Jennings	1:03.80
1915-18	No Race
1919	Bright Folly	Arthur Smith	Frank Barling
1920	Nutcracker	Bernard Carslake	Atty Persse
1921	Alaric	Joe Childs	James Rhodes
1922	Tricky Aunt	George Hulme	Richard Dawson
1923	Purple Shade	Vic Smyth	Easterbee	1:04.00
1924	Diagoras	Harry Beasley Jr.	Sam H Darling	1:04.40
1925	Nothing Venture	Jack Leach	Felix Leach	1:03.00
1926	Fourth Hand	Harry Beasley Jr.	Atty Persse	1:25.80
1927	Sunny Trace	Joe Childs	Fred Darling	1:04.40
1928	Reedsmouth	Harry Beasley Jr.	Atty Persse	1:04.80
1929	Teacup	Michael Beary	Richard Dawson	1:03.20
1930	Jacopo	Joe Childs	Cecil Boyd-Rochfort	1:04.80
1931 (dh)	Rolling Rock; Taj Kasra	Rufus Beasley; Michael Beary	Victor Gilpin; Richard Dawson	1:04.20
1932	Generous Gift	Rufus Beasley	Jack Colling	1:02.60
1933	Campanula	Eph Smith	Jack Jarvis	1:03.80
1934	Theft	Richard Perryman	Frank Butters	1:04.20
1935	Veuve Clicquot	Freddy Lane	Fred Butters	1:04.60
1936	The Hour	Eph Smith	Jack Jarvis	1:04.60
1937	Scotia's Glen	Steve Donoghue	Joseph Lawson	1:03.40
1938	Portobello	Rufus Beasley	Jack Colling	1:01.80
1939	Alix	Charles Bouillon	In France	1:06.40
1940-45	No Race
1946	Combat	Gordon Richards	Fred Darling	1:05.60
1947	First Night	Ken Gethin	Walter Nightingall	1:04.20
1948	No Race
1949	Tabriz	Gordon Richards	Frank Butters	1:02.80
1950	Stokes	Gordon Richards	Norman Bertie	1:04.80
1951	Indian Hemp	Doug Smith	Marcus Marsh	1:03.60
1952	Masai King	Charlie Smirke	Marcus Marsh	1:03.20
1953	Kings Evidence	Eph Smith	Ted Leader	1:04.60
1954	Summer Solstice	Joe Mercer	Derrick Candy	1:04.20
1955	Storm Sail	Bill Rickaby	William Smyth	1:03.78
1956	Fulfer	Stan Clayton	Geoffrey Brooke	1:04.14
1957	Rich and Rare	Manny Mercer	Jack Jarvis	1:01.79
1958	Carnoustie	Lester Piggott	Noel Murless	1:03.36
1959	Monamolin	Eddie Cracknell	Fulke Walwyn	1:01.56
1960	Skymaster	Scobie Breasley	William Smyth	1:03.24
1961	Prince Tor	Geoff Lewis	Brud Fetherstonhaugh	1:04.31
1962	Summer Day	Eph Smith	John Waugh	1:05.28
1963	Goldhill	J Hetherington	Peter Easterby	1:05.76
1964	Abandoned due to waterlogging
1965	Sky Gipsy	Ron Hutchinson	Gordon Smyth	1:05.72
1966	On Your Mark	Lester Piggott	Frank Armstrong	1:04.00
1967	D'Urberville	Jimmy Lindley	Jeremy Tree	1:02.43
1968	Hopiana	Sandy Barclay	Arthur Budgett	1:03.77
1969	Mange Tout	Brian Foy	Ken Cundell	1:04.66
1970	Lush Park	Johnny Seagrave	Pat Rohan	1:01.60
1971	Dawn Review	Taffy Thomas	Ted Leader	1:07.66
1972	Adams Pet	Richard Marshall	Bill Marshall	1:03.67
1973	Daring Boy	Eddie Hide	Arthur Budgett	1:04.02
1974	Streak	Willie Carson	John Sutcliffe	1:01.06
1975	Music Boy	Johnny Seagrave	Snowy Wainwright	1:02.22
1976	Sunny Spring	Gianfranco Dettori	Luca Cumani	1:03.44
1977	Tardot	Willie Carson	Michael Kauntze	1:03.60
1978	Blue Refrain	Brian Rouse	John Benstead	1:03.50
1979	Rollahead	Joe Mercer	Jeremy Hindley	1:02.82
1980	Cooliney Prince	George McGrath	Paddy Prendergast jnr.	1:04.57
1981	Tender King	Philip Waldron	John Sutcliffe	1:02.45
1982	Prince Reymo	Steve Cauthen	Robert Armstrong	1:02.57
1983	Defecting Dancer	Lester Piggott	Henry Cecil	1:02.40
1984	Sea Falcon	Steve Cauthen	Peter Makin	1:03.33
1985	Atall Atall	Paul Eddery	Martin Pipe	1:04.45
1986	Carol's Treasure	Brent Thomson	Barry Hills	1:00.85
1987	Space Cruiser	Steve Cauthen	Henry Cecil	1:06.29
1988	Barrys Gamble	Pat Eddery	Squeak Fairhurst	1:02.21
1989	Pharaoh's Delight	Pat Eddery	Peter Hudson	1:02.51
1990	Gipsy Fiddler	Pat Eddery	Jonjo O'Neill	1:03.60
1991	Isdar	Richard Hills	Harry Thomson Jones	1:02.80
1992	Satank	Pat Eddery	Bill Watts	1:01.82
1993	Great Deeds	Richard Quinn	Mick Channon	1:04.18
1994	Brave Music (Note: The 1994 winner Brave Music was later exported to Hong Kong and renamed Che Sara Sara)	Richard Quinn	Paul Cole	1:02.45
1995	Kuantan	Richard Quinn	Paul Cole	1:01.28
1996	Dazzle	Kieren Fallon	Michael Stoute	1:01.09
1997	Asfurah	Richard Hills	Saeed bin Suroor	1:02.03
1998	Flanders	Lindsay Charnock	Tim Easterby	1:02.37
1999	Kalindi	Richard Quinn	Mick Channon	1:01.99
2000	Autumnal	Pat Eddery	Brian Meehan	1:02.86
2001	Irony	Pat Eddery	Jamie Osborne	1:01.00
2002	Revenue	Johnny Murtagh	Michael Bell	1:02.14
2003	Holborn	Steve Drowne	Mick Channon	1:00.08
2004	Chateau Istana (Note: The 2004 winner Chateau Istana was later exported to Hong Kong and renamed Chateau King Prawn)	Tom Queally	Nick Littmoden	1:01.45
2005 (Note: The 2005 running took place at York)	Titus Alone	Kevin Darley	Bryan Smart	0:57.90
2006	Elhamri	Declan McDonogh	Sylvester Kirk	1:00.82
2007	Drawnfromthepast	Martin Dwyer	Jamie Osborne	0:59.77
2008	Flashmans Papers	Steve Drowne	John Best	1:00.60
2009	Strike The Tiger	John R. Velazquez	Wesley A. Ward	1:01.28
2010	Marine Commando	Paul Hanagan	Richard Fahey	1:01.09
2011	Frederick Engels	Johnny Murtagh	David Brown	0:59.91
2012	Hototo	Phillip Makin	Kevin Ryan	1:01.21
2013	Extortionist	Johnny Murtagh	Olly Stevens	0:59.82
2014	Hootenanny	Victor Espinoza	Wesley A. Ward	0:59.05
2015	Washington DC	Ryan Moore	Aidan O'Brien	1:00.04
2016	Ardad	Robert Havlin	John Gosden	1:02.56
2017	Sound and Silence	William Buick	Charlie Appleby	0:59.20
2018	Soldier's Call	Daniel Tudhope	Archie Watson	1:00.25
2019	Southern Hills	Ryan Moore	Aidan O'Brien	1:03.05
2020	Tactical	James Doyle	Andrew Balding	1:00.04
2021	Chipotle	Charles Bishop	Eve Johnson Houghton	0:59.79
2022	Little Big Bear	Ryan Moore	Aidan O'Brien	1:00.33
2023	Big Evs	Jason Hart	Michael Appleby	0:59.91
2024	Ain't Nobody	Jamie Spencer	Kevin Ryan	0:59.32
2025	Havana Hurricane	Charles Bishop	Eve Johnson Houghton	1:00.06
2026	King of Cloughan	Billy Loughnane	Joseph O'Brien	1:13.34

== See also ==
- Horse racing in Great Britain
- List of British flat horse races
