= Cartier Champion Two-year-old Colt =

Award in European horse racing

The Cartier Champion Two-year-old Colt is an award in European horse racing, founded in 1991, and sponsored by Cartier SA as part of the Cartier Racing Awards. The award winner is decided by points earned in group races plus the votes cast by British racing journalists and readers of the Racing Post and The Daily Telegraph newspapers.

== Records ==
Leading trainer (15 wins):

- Aidan O'Brien – Fasliyev (1999), Johannesburg (2001), Hold That Tiger (2002), One Cool Cat (2003), George Washington (2005), Mastercraftsman (2008), St Nicholas Abbey (2009), Gleneagles (2014), Air Force Blue (2015), Churchill (2016), U S Navy Flag (2017), Van Gogh (2020), Blackbeard (2022), City of Troy (2023), Gstaad (2025)

Leading owner (15 wins):

- Michael Tabor – Fasliyev (1999), Johannesburg (2001), Hold That Tiger (2002), One Cool Cat (2003), George Washington (2005), Mastercraftsman (2008), St Nicholas Abbey (2009), Gleneagles (2014), Air Force Blue (2015), Churchill (2016), U S Navy Flag (2017), Van Gogh (2020), Blackbeard (2022), City of Troy (2023), Gstaad (2025)
- Sue Magnier – Fasliyev (1999), Johannesburg (2001), Hold That Tiger (2002), One Cool Cat (2003), George Washington (2005), Mastercraftsman (2008), St Nicholas Abbey (2009), Gleneagles (2014), Air Force Blue (2015), Churchill (2016), U S Navy Flag (2017), Van Gogh (2020), Blackbeard (2022), City of Troy (2023), Gstaad (2025)

=== Winners ===
Year	Horse	Bred	Trained	Trainer	Owner
1991	Arazi	USA	FR	François Boutin	Allen Paulson
1992	Zafonic	USA	FR	André Fabre	Khalid Abdullah
1993	First Trump	GB	GB	Geoff Wragg	Moller Racing
1994	Celtic Swing	GB	GB	Lady Herries	Peter Savill
1995	Alhaarth	IRE	GB	Dick Hern	Hamdan Al Maktoum
1996	Bahamian Bounty^{[1]}	GB	GB	David Loder	Lucayan Stud
1996	Revoque^{[1]}	IRE	GB	Peter Chapple-Hyam	Robert Sangster
1997	Xaar	GB	FR	André Fabre	Khalid Abdullah
1998	Aljabr	USA	GB	Saeed bin Suroor	Godolphin
1999	Fasliyev	USA	IRE	Aidan O'Brien	Sue Magnier and Michael Tabor
2000	Tobougg	IRE	GB	Mick Channon	Ahmed Al Maktoum
2001	Johannesburg	USA	IRE	Aidan O'Brien	Sue Magnier and Michael Tabor
2002	Hold That Tiger	USA	IRE	Aidan O'Brien	Sue Magnier and Michael Tabor
2003	One Cool Cat	USA	IRE	Aidan O'Brien	Sue Magnier and Michael Tabor
2004	Shamardal	USA	GB	Mark Johnston	Gainsborough Stud
2005	George Washington	IRE	IRE	Aidan O'Brien	Magnier, Tabor and Smith
2006	Teofilo	IRE	IRE	Jim Bolger	Mrs J S Bolger & John Corcoran
2007	New Approach	IRE	IRE	Jim Bolger	Princess Haya of Jordan
2008	Mastercraftsman	IRE	IRE	Aidan O'Brien	Magnier, Tabor and Smith
2009	St Nicholas Abbey	IRE	IRE	Aidan O'Brien	Magnier, Tabor and Smith
2010	Frankel	GB	GB	Henry Cecil	Khalid Abdullah
2011	Dabirsim	FR	FR	Christophe Ferland	Simon Springer
2012	Dawn Approach	IRE	IRE	Jim Bolger	Godolphin
2013	Kingston Hill	GB	GB	Roger Varian	Paul Smith
2014	Gleneagles	IRE	IRE	Aidan O'Brien	Tabor, Magnier and Smith
2015	Air Force Blue	USA	IRE	Aidan O'Brien	Tabor, Smith and Magnier
2016	Churchill	IRE	IRE	Aidan O'Brien	Tabor, Smith and Magnier
2017	U S Navy Flag	USA	IRE	Aidan O'Brien	Tabor, Smith and Magnier
2018	Too Darn Hot	GB	GB	John Gosden	Andrew Lloyd Webber
2019	Pinatubo	IRE	GB	Charlie Appleby	Godolphin
2020	Van Gogh	USA	IRE	Aidan O'Brien	Tabor, Smith and Magnier
2021	Native Trail	GB	GB	Charlie Appleby	Godolphin
2022	Blackbeard	IRE	IRE	Aidan O'Brien	Magnier, Tabor, Smith & Westerberg
2023	City of Troy	USA	IRE	Aidan O'Brien	Magnier, Tabor & Smith
2024	Shadow of Light	GB	GB	Charlie Appleby	Godolphin
2025	Gstaad	GB	GB	Aidan O'Brien	Magnier, Tabor & Smith
2026	Darkness Falls	IRE	IRE	Aidan O'Brien	Magnier, Tabor, Smith & Westerberg

^{[1]} Two awards were given in 1996. Revoque was named Champion Two-year-old; Bahamian Bounty was named Champion Two-year-old Colt.
