= Rip Van Winkle (horse) =

Irish-bred Thoroughbred racehorse

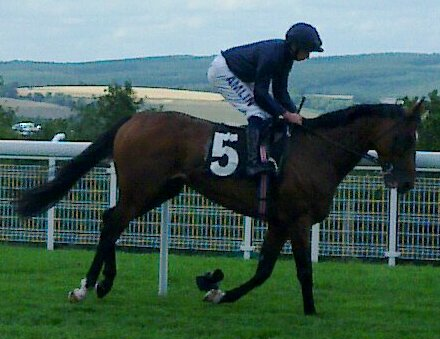
- Rip Van Winkle heading to post for the 2010 running of the Sussex Stakes
- Sire: Galileo
- Grandsire: Sadler's Wells
- Dam: Looking Back
- Damsire: Stravinsky
- Sex: Colt
- Foaled: 12 February 2006
- Died: 31 July 2020 (aged 14)
- Country: Ireland
- Colour: Bay
- Breeder: Roberto Brogi
- Owner: Susan Magnier, Michael Tabor & Derrick Smith
- Trainer: Aidan O'Brien
- Record: 14: 5-4-0
- Earnings: £1,201,333

Major wins
- Tyros Stakes (2008); Sussex Stakes (2009); Queen Elizabeth II Stakes (2009); International Stakes (2010)

Rip Van Winkle (12 February 2006 – 31 July 2020) was an Irish Thoroughbred racehorse sired by the dual Derby winner Galileo. Like his sire, Rip Van Winkle was also trained by Aidan O'Brien.

== Racing career ==
=== 2008: two-year-old season ===
Winning his maiden race at the first time of asking, Rip Van Winkle then went on to win the Group 3 Tyros Stakes. After that effort, Rip Van Winkle started as the 6/4 favourite to win the Dewhurst on his final start as a two-year-old but was stuck behind a wall of horses in a bunched finish in which the first four home were covered by only half a length. He finished seventh, two lengths behind Intense Focus.

=== 2009: three-year-old season ===
Despite the Dewhurst defeat, Rip Van Winkle started second favourite for the following season's 2000 Guineas largely due to his being still very unexposed and apparently the stable's first string as Johnny Murtagh had chosen him over Mastercraftsman. This was to be Rip Van Winkle's first clash with the eventual winner Sea the Stars, who went on to dominate the flat season. Rip Van Winkle finished fourth.

On Derby day, he was again prominent in the betting but, despite Johnny Murtagh sticking with him and claiming he was the best horse he had ever sat upon, it was his stablemate Fame and Glory who went off marginal favourite just ahead of Sea the Stars. Rip Van Winkle finished fourth, and the entire Ballydoyle team of six horses were again well beaten by Sea The Stars.

In his next race at Sandown, back at a mile and 2, Sea the Stars was bidding to become the first horse to win the Guineas, Derby, Eclipse Stakes treble since Nashwan. Rip Van Winkle tracked him throughout the race, and the two went clear two furlongs out. He looked like overtaking Sea the Stars, a half brother to Rip Van Winkle's sire, but as he drew level, his nemesis accelerated and won by half a length.

Rip Van Winkle then dropped back to a mile to win the Sussex Stakes. Paco Boy and the record-breaking 1000 Guineas winner Ghanaati were well behind him at the finish. He followed up with another Group One winning the QEII Stakes, again at a mile and again from the front, his stamina winning the day from Guineas second Delegator.

His 2009 season concluded with a run in the Breeders' Cup Classic behind Zenyatta after he appeared not to handle the track.

=== 2010: four-year-old season ===
Rip Van Winkle's three-year-old season was disrupted by injury, and his four-year-old campaign was also set back due to niggling injury problems. In his first start, he finished well behind Goldikova and Paco Boy in the Queen Anne Stakes at Royal Ascot. He then tried for a repeat performance in the Sussex Stakes, where he was beaten into second late on by the three-year-old star Canford Cliffs.

Rip Van Winkle then went back up to a mile and 2 furlongs in York's International Stakes. Despite his lack of a win that season, he went off as favourite and won by half a length. It was Rip Van Winkle's third Group One victory.

Soft ground seemed to go against him on his next two starts, the Irish Champion Stakes in which he was beaten by a strong front-running ride by half-brother and stable mate Cape Blanco. Two weeks later, he was back over a mile in the QEII stakes at Ascot where he was nipped by a nose on the line by a three-year-old after an aggressive ride where he committed early. Poets Voice, the son of soft ground specialist Dubawi and winner of the Celebration Stakes, beat him in the last stride, ridden by Frankie Dettori, who won four out of his five races on the day at Ascot.

== Stud career ==
Rip Van Winkle retired to Coolmore Stud in 2010. He sired 3 individual Group 1 winners:

=== Notable progeny ===
c = colt, f = filly, g = gelding

Foaled	Name	Sex	Major Wins
2012	Dick Whittington	c	Phoenix Stakes
2014	Te Akau Shark	g	Waikato Sprint, Chipping Norton Stakes
2016	Jennifer Eccles	f	New Zealand Oaks
2016	Subpoenaed	f	Golden Pendant, Millie Fox, 2nd Robert Sangster

== Death ==
It was reported on 31 July 2020 by Windsor Park Stud that Rip Van Winkle had died aged 14 after suffering a short illness.
