= Johannesburg (horse) =

American-bred Thoroughbred racehorse

- Sire: Hennessy
- Grandsire: Storm Cat
- Dam: Myth
- Damsire: Ogygian
- Sex: Stallion
- Foaled: 1999
- Country: United States
- Colour: Bay
- Breeder: W. G. Lyster III & Jayeff 'B' Stables
- Owner: Michael Tabor & Sue Magnier
- Trainer: Aidan O'Brien
- Record: 10: 7-1-0
- Earnings: US$1,014,584

Major wins
- Norfolk Stakes (2001); Anglesey Stakes (2001); Phoenix Stakes (2001); Prix Morny (2001); Middle Park Stakes (2001); Breeders' Cup Juvenile (2001)

Awards
- Cartier Champion Two-year-old Colt (2001); United States Champion 2-Yr-Old Colt (2001)
- Last updated on April 1, 2007

Johannesburg (foaled on February 23, 1999) is a Kentucky-bred United States and European Champion Thoroughbred racehorse.

== Background ==
Johannesburg was trained by Aidan O'Brien at Ballydoyle.

== Racing career ==
Johannesburg was unbeaten as a 2-year-old, winning 7 races, 4 of them Group 1s, including the Phoenix Stakes, Prix Morny, Middle Park Stakes and Breeders' Cup Juvenile. For his performances in the 2001 racing season, he earned the Cartier Award for Two-Year-Old European Champion Colt.

He had 3 starts as a 3-year-old, including an 8th-place finish in the Kentucky Derby and 9th in the Golden Jubilee Stakes at Royal Ascot.

== Stud record ==
Johannesburg was retired to the Ashford Stud near Versailles, Kentucky, the American arm of the giant Irish breeder Coolmore Stud. For a time, he shuttled between Ashford Stud and Coolmore Australia near Jerrys Plains, New South Wales for the Southern Hemisphere breeding season, but as of 2009 stood exclusively in Kentucky. In October 2009 he was sold to Shizunai Stallion Station on the island of Hokkaido, Japan. His progeny include the Group 2 winner Hamoody and Scat Daddy, winner of the 2007 Grade I Florida Derby and sire of 2018 Triple Crown winner Justify. He also sired Group 1 AJC Oaks and Group 2 ATC Chairmans Handicap winner Once Were Wild when at stud in Australia. His other top runners include grade II winner Teuflesberg, French group I winner Sageburg, and Australian group I winner Turffontein and a total of 69 stakes winners.

He was retired from breeding in 2019.

== Pedigree ==
Pedigree of Johannesburg
Sire Hennessy	Storm Cat	Storm Bird	Northern Dancer
Sire Hennessy	Storm Cat	Storm Bird	South Ocean
Sire Hennessy	Storm Cat	Terlingua	Secretariat
Sire Hennessy	Storm Cat	Terlingua	Crimson Sun
Sire Hennessy	Island Kitty	Hawaii	Utrilo II
Sire Hennessy	Island Kitty	Hawaii	Ethane
Sire Hennessy	Island Kitty	T. C. Kitten	Tom Cat
Sire Hennessy	Island Kitty	T. C. Kitten	Needlebug
Dam Myth	Ogygian	Damascus	Sword Dancer
Dam Myth	Ogygian	Damascus	Kerala
Dam Myth	Ogygian	Gonfalon	Francis S
Dam Myth	Ogygian	Gonfalon	Grand Splendor
Dam Myth	Yarn	Mr. Prospector	Raise a Native
Dam Myth	Yarn	Mr. Prospector	Gold Digger
Dam Myth	Yarn	Narrate	Honest Pleasure
Dam Myth	Yarn	Narrate	State
