= Embassy (horse) =

British Thoroughbred racehorse

- Racing colours of Sheikh Mohammed
- Sire: Cadeaux Genereux
- Grandsire: Young Generation
- Dam: Pass the Peace
- Damsire: Alzao
- Sex: Mare
- Foaled: 24 March 1995
- Country: United Kingdom
- Colour: Bay
- Breeder: Sheikh Mohammed
- Owner: Sheikh Mohammed
- Trainer: David Loder
- Record: 4: 3-1-0
- Earnings: £109,950

Major wins
- Princess Margaret Stakes (1997); Cheveley Park Stakes (1997)

Awards
- European Champion Two-year-old Filly
- Last updated on June 22, 2007

Embassy (24 March 1995 – 4 August 2016) was a British champion Thoroughbred racehorse and broodmare. She won three of her four starts as a two-year-old including the Group One Cheveley Park Stakes and the Group Three Princess Margaret Stakes. She was named European Champion Two-year-old Filly at the Cartier Racing Awards, and was the highest rated two-year-old filly in the International Classification. At the end of her two-year-old season she was transferred to the Godolphin Racing team, but never ran again.

== Background ==
Embassy was bred by her owner Sheikh Mohammed. She was sired by the sprinter Cadeaux Genereux out of Pass the Peace.

Cadeaux Genereux won several major sprint races including the Nunthorpe Stakes and the July Cup. At stud he sired over 1,000 winners including Touch of the Blues (Atto Mile), Bijou d'Inde (St James's Palace Stakes) and Toylsome (Prix de la Forêt). Pass The Peace won the Cheveley Park Stakes in 1988 and was also the dam of the Pretty Polly Stakes winner Tarfshi.

Embassy was trained for all her races by David Loder at Newmarket, Suffolk.

== Racing career ==
=== 1997: two-year-old season ===
Embassy began her career as the odds-on favourite for a maiden race at Newmarket. Pat Eddery tracked the leaders on Embassy before sending her into the lead a furlong out and winning by one and a quarter lengths from a field that included the future May Hill Stakes winner Midnight Line.

Just over two weeks later, Embassy was stepped up to Group Three level for the Princess Margaret Stakes at Ascot, for which she was made joint-favourite with Miss Zafonic. Embassy moved into the lead inside the last quarter mile and went clear to win by two lengths.

For her next start Embassy was sent to York for the Group Two Lowther Stakes, in which she was matched against the Queen Mary Stakes winner Nadwah and the highly regarded Cape Verdi. Embassy took the lead, but drifted left inside the final furlong and was caught on the line and beaten a short head by Cape Verdi, who was receiving three pounds. Pat Eddery received some criticism from observers who felt that he had been too easy on Embassy in the closing stages.

On her final start, Embassy met Cape Verdi again in the Group One Cheveley Park Stakes at Newmarket in which she was ridden by Kieren Fallon. Since the York race Cape Verdi had been bought by Godolphin, and she started the 11/8 favourite ahead of Embassy on 5/2. Fallon held his filly up in the early stages before bringing her up to challenge for the lead a furlong out. Embassy quickened well and pulled clear of the field to win by two and a half lengths from Crazee Mental, with Cape Verdi fourth. After the race Loder paid tribute to the filly's "tremendous acceleration" and the bookmakers made her 6/1 clear favourite for the following year's 1000 Guineas.

=== 1998: three-year-old season ===
Embassy was transferred by Sheikh Mohammed to the Godolphin racing team and joined the stable of Saeed bin Suroor. She spent the winter in Dubai and was returned to England the following spring. She was identified by Godolphin's racing manager, Simon Crisford as one of Godolphin's biggest hopes for 1998, despite a "minor scare" in training in March which required veterinary attention. A disappointing performance in a private Godolphin trial in April saw her supplanted by Cape Verdi at the head of the betting for the Guineas. Embassy was still expected to run in the 1000 Guineas, but a few days before the event it was announced that she had not made the expected progress and would miss the race.

Embassy never recovered her form and her retirement was announced in August 1998.

== Race record ==
Date	Race	Dist (f)	Course	Class	Prize (£K)	Odds	Runners	Placing	Margin	Time	Jockey	Trainer
10 July 1997	Chippenham Lodge Maiden Stakes	6	Newmarket July	M	6	10/11	13	1	1.25	1:14.00	Pat Eddery	David Loder
26 July 1997	Princess Margaret Stakes	6	Ascot	3	23	5/2	7	1	2	1:16.80	Pat Eddery	David Loder
21 August 1997	Lowther Stakes	6	York	2	45	11/4	9	2	short head	1:12.48	Pat Eddery	David Loder
30 September 1997	Cheveley Park Stakes	6	Newmarket Rowley	1	63	5/2	8	1	2.5	1:12.26	Kieren Fallon	David Loder

== Assessment ==
In the International Classification for 1997, Embassy was given a rating of 118, making her officially the best two-year-old filly in Europe.

She was also named European Champion Two-year-old filly at the Cartier Racing Awards.

== Stud career ==
At stud Embassy has produced at least four minor winners: Diplomatic, Grosvenor Square, Felicitous and Gleneagles. She also produced Politesse, who was the dam of the Prix Maurice de Gheest winner King's Apostle.

Embassy was scheduled to be auctioned in December 2009 at Tattersalls, but was withdrawn from sale.

== Pedigree ==
Pedigree of Embassy (GB), bay mare, 1995
Sire Cadeaux Genereux (GB) 1985	Young Generation; 1976	Balidar	Will Somers
Sire Cadeaux Genereux (GB) 1985	Young Generation; 1976	Balidar	Violet Bank
Sire Cadeaux Genereux (GB) 1985	Young Generation; 1976	Brig O' Doon	Shantung
Sire Cadeaux Genereux (GB) 1985	Young Generation; 1976	Brig O' Doon	Tam O' Shanter
Sire Cadeaux Genereux (GB) 1985	Smarten Up; 1975	Sharpen Up	Atan
Sire Cadeaux Genereux (GB) 1985	Smarten Up; 1975	Sharpen Up	Rocchetta
Sire Cadeaux Genereux (GB) 1985	Smarten Up; 1975	Languissola	Soderini
Sire Cadeaux Genereux (GB) 1985	Smarten Up; 1975	Languissola	Posh
Dam Pass the Peace (IRE) 1986	Alzao; 1980	Lyphard	Northern Dancer
Dam Pass the Peace (IRE) 1986	Alzao; 1980	Lyphard	Goofed
Dam Pass the Peace (IRE) 1986	Alzao; 1980	Lady Rebecca	Sir Ivor
Dam Pass the Peace (IRE) 1986	Alzao; 1980	Lady Rebecca	Pocahontas
Dam Pass the Peace (IRE) 1986	Lover's Rose; 1976	King Emperor	Bold Ruler
Dam Pass the Peace (IRE) 1986	Lover's Rose; 1976	King Emperor	Irish Jay
Dam Pass the Peace (IRE) 1986	Lover's Rose; 1976	Nonnie	Dumbarnie
Dam Pass the Peace (IRE) 1986	Lover's Rose; 1976	Nonnie	Rossenhall (Family: 8f)
