= Moyglare Stud Stakes =

- Class: Group 1
- Location: Curragh Racecourse; County Kildare, Ireland
- Race type: Flat / Thoroughbred
- Sponsor: Moyglare Stud
- Website: Curragh

Race information
- Distance: 7f (1,408 metres)
- Surface: Turf
- Track: Right-hand elbow
- Qualification: Two-year-old fillies
- Weight: 9 st 0 lb
- Purse: €376,000 (2022); 1st: €236,000

Moyglare Stud Stakes
2026
Sun Goddess	Green Empress	Dancing Destiny

Previous years
2025
Precise	Beautify	Venetian Sun
2024
Lake Victoria	Simmering	Exactly
2023
Fallen Angel	Vespertilio	Ornellaia
2022
Tahiyra	Meditate	Eternal Silence
2021
Discoveries	Agartha	Sunset Shiraz

2020-2011
2020
Shale	Pretty Gorgeous	Oodnadatta
2019
Love	Daahyeh	So Wonderful
2018
Skitter Scatter	Lady Kaya	Hermosa
2017
Happily	Magical	September
2016
Intricately	Hydrangea	Rhododendron
2015
Minding	Ballydoyle	Alice Springs
2014
Cursory Glance	Lucida	Found
2013
Rizeena	Tapestry	Kiyoshi
2012
Sky Lantern	Scintillula	Harasiya
2011
Maybe	Fire Lily	La Collina

2010-2001
2010
Misty For Me	Laughing Lashes	Kissable
2009
Termagant	Famous	Lillie Langtry
2008
Again	Shimah	Beyond Our Reach
2007
Saoirse Abu	Listen	Mad About You
2006
Miss Beatrix	Silca Chiave	Supposition
2005
Rumplestiltskin	Ugo Fire	Ardbrae Lady
2004
Chelsea Rose	Pictavia	Saoire
2003
Necklace	Red Feather	Menhoubah
2002
Mail The Desert	Luminata	Pearl Dance
2001
Quarter Moon	Dress To Thrill	Sophisticat

2000-1991
2000
Sequoyah	Hotelgenie Dot Com	Mala Mala
1999
Preseli	Torgau	Littlefeather
1998
Edabiya	Fear And Greed	Crystal Downs
1997
Tarascon	Heed My Warning	Shahtoush
1996
Bianca Nera	Ryafan	Azra
1995
Priory Belle	Tamnia	My Melody Parkes
1994
Belle Genius	Tereshkova	Eva Luna
1993
Lemon Souffle	Spain Lane	Low Key Affair
1992
Sayyedati	Bright Generation	Alouette
1991
Twafeaj	Tarwiya	Poolesta

1990-1988
1990
Capricciosa	Inishdalla	Zigaura
1989
Chimes Of Freedom	Pharaoh's Delight	Annie Laurie
1988
Flamenco Wave	Honoria	Heather Seeker

The Moyglare Stud Stakes is a Group 1 flat horse race in Ireland open to two-year-old thoroughbred fillies. It is run at the Curragh over a distance of 7 furlongs (1,408 metres), and it is scheduled to take place each year in late August or early September.

== History ==
The event is named after its long-term sponsor, Moyglare Stud. It was formerly contested over 6 furlongs, and for a period it held Group 3 status. It was promoted to Group 2 level in 1979, and to Group 1 in 1983. Its distance was extended to 7 furlongs in 1992. In 2014 it became part of the Irish Champions Weekend fixture.

The Moyglare Stud Stakes became part of the Breeders' Cup Challenge series in 2009. The winner of the race now earns an automatic invitation to compete in the same year's Breeders' Cup Juvenile Fillies Turf.

== Records ==
Leading jockey since 1973 (4 wins):

- Christy Roche – Tender Camilla (1974), Petipa (1975), Daness (1979), Arctique Royale (1980)

Leading trainer since 1973 (11 wins):

- Aidan O'Brien – Sequoyah (2000), Quarter Moon (2001), Necklace (2003), Rumplestiltskin (2005), Misty for Me (2010), Maybe (2011), Minding (2015), Happily (2017), Love (2019), Lake Victoria (2024), Precise (2025)

Leading owner since 1980 (12 wins): (includes part ownership)

- Sue Magnier – Sequoyah (2000), Necklace (2003), Rumplestiltskin (2005), Again (2008), Misty for Me (2010), Maybe (2011), Minding (2015), Happily (2017), Love (2019), Shale (2020), Lake Victoria (2024), Precise (2025)

== Winners since 1980 ==
Year	Winner	Jockey	Trainer	Owner	Time
1980	Arctique Royale	Christy Roche	Kevin Prendergast	Paddy Prendergast
1981	Woodstream	Pat Eddery	Vincent O'Brien	Robert Sangster	1:16.50
1982	Habibti	Declan Gillespie	John Dunlop	Mohamed Mutawa	1:16.00
1983	Gala Event	Kevin Moses	Ted Curtin	F. N. Groves	1:14.70
1984	Park Appeal	Declan Gillespie	Jim Bolger	Paddy Burns
1985	Gayle Gal	Donal Manning	Phil Canty	W. Finnigan	1:14.20
1986	Minstrella	John Reid	Charlie Nelson	Edward P. Evans	1:11.40
1987	Flutter Away	Michael Kinane	Dermot Weld	Oliver Murphy	1:17.30
1988	Flamenco Wave	Ron Quinton	John Oxx	Sheikh Mohammed	1:16.10
1989	Chimes of Freedom	Steve Cauthen	Henry Cecil	Stavros Niarchos	1:10.90
1990	Capricciosa	John Reid	Vincent O'Brien	Robert Sangster	1:11.70
1991	Twafeaj	Bruce Raymond	Ben Hanbury	Abdulla Buhaleeba	1:11.30
1992	Sayyedati	Michael Roberts	Clive Brittain	Mohamed Obaida	1:31.50
1993	Lemon Souffle	Lester Piggott	Richard Hannon Sr.	7th Earl of Carnarvon	1:27.50
1994	Belle Genius	Jason Weaver	Paul Kelleway	L. J. Rice	1:28.30
1995	Priory Belle	Pat Gilson	Jim Bolger	Ballylinch Stud	1:25.20
1996	Bianca Nera	Kevin Darley	David Loder	Simon Frisby	1:26.30
1997	Tarascon	Pat Smullen	Tommy Stack	Jane Rowlinson	1:28.50
1998	Edabiya	Johnny Murtagh	John Oxx	HH Aga Khan IV	1:29.20
1999	Preseli	Eddie Ahern	Michael Grassick	Neil Jones	1:24.20
2000	Sequoyah	Jamie Spencer	Aidan O'Brien	Sue Magnier	1:26.70
2001	Quarter Moon	Michael Kinane	Aidan O'Brien	Roisin Henry	1:24.50
2002	Mail The Desert	Steve Drowne	Mick Channon	John Livock	1:25.50
2003	Necklace	Michael Kinane	Aidan O'Brien	Tabor / Magnier	1:23.10
2004	Chelsea Rose	Pat Shanahan	Con Collins	Frances Donnelly	1:24.20
2005	Rumplestiltskin	Kieren Fallon	Aidan O'Brien	Magnier / Tabor et al.	1:25.80
2006	Miss Beatrix	Willie Supple	Kevin Prendergast	William Durkan	1:23.10
2007	Saoirse Abu	Kevin Manning	Jim Bolger	Ennistown Stud / Bolger	1:25.01
2008	Again	Seamie Heffernan	David Wachman	Tabor / Magnier	1:28.83
2009	Termagant	Declan McDonogh	Kevin Prendergast	Joerg Vasicek	1:35.18
2010	Misty for Me	Seamie Heffernan	Aidan O'Brien	Tabor / Magnier / Smith	1:24.56
2011	Maybe	Joseph O'Brien	Aidan O'Brien	Tabor / Smith / Magnier	1:24.26
2012	Sky Lantern	Richard Hughes	Richard Hannon Sr.	Brian Keswick	1:25.14
2013	Rizeena	James Doyle	Clive Brittain	Sheik Rashid Al Maktoum	1:22.91
2014	Cursory Glance	Andrea Atzeni	Roger Varian	Merry Fox Stud	1:28.80
2015	Minding	Seamie Heffernan	Aidan O'Brien	Tabor / Magnier / Smith	1:28.48
2016	Intricately	Donnacha O'Brien	Joseph O'Brien	Chantal Regalado-Gonzalez	1:28.50
2017	Happily	Donnacha O'Brien	Aidan O'Brien	Tabor / Magnier / Smith	1:26.93
2018	Skitter Scatter	Ronan Whelan	Patrick Prendergast	Anthony Rogers, Sonia Rogers	1:25.60
2019	Love	Ryan Moore	Aidan O'Brien	Tabor / Magnier / Smith	1:24.28
2020	Shale	Ryan Moore	Donnacha O'Brien	Tabor / Magnier / Smith	1:27.19
2021	Discoveries	Shane Foley	Jessica Harrington	Niarchos Family	1:27.10
2022	Tahiyra	Chris Hayes	Dermot Weld	HH Aga Khan IV	1:29.16
2023	Fallen Angel	Daniel Tudhope	Karl Burke	Clipper Logistics	1:27.50
2024	Lake Victoria	Wayne Lordan	Aidan O'Brien	Tabor / Magnier / Smith	1:23.73
2025	Precise	Ronan Whelan	Aidan O'Brien	Smith / Magnier / Tabor / Westerberg	1:29.13
2026	Sun Goddess	Ryan Moore	Aidan O'Brien	Smith / Magnier / Tabor / Westerberg	1:27.68

== Earlier winners ==
- 1970: What's a Name
- 1971: Princess Bonita
- 1972: Where You Lead
- 1973: Milly Whiteway
- 1974: Tender Camilla
- 1975: Petipa
- 1976: Regal Ray
- 1977: Ridaness
- 1978: Phil's Fancy
- 1979: Daness

== See also ==
- Horse racing in Ireland
- List of Irish flat horse races
