= Misty for Me =

Irish-bred Thoroughbred racehorse

- Racing silks of Michael Tabor
- Sire: Galileo
- Grandsire: Sadler's Wells
- Dam: Butterfly Cove
- Damsire: Storm Cat
- Sex: Mare
- Foaled: 9 April 2008
- Country: Ireland
- Colour: Bay
- Breeder: March Thoroughbreds
- Owner: Sue Magnier, Michael Tabor & Derrick Smith
- Trainer: Aidan O'Brien
- Record: 11: 5-1-2
- Earnings: £548,953

Major wins
- Moyglare Stud Stakes (2010); Prix Marcel Boussac (2010); Irish 1,000 Guineas (2011); Pretty Polly Stakes (2011)

Awards
- Cartier Champion Two-year-old Filly (2010)

Misty for Me is an Irish champion Thoroughbred racehorse and broodmare. She won three of her five starts as a two-year-old including the Group One Moyglare Stud Stakes and the Prix Marcel Boussac, the most important races for two-year-old fillies in Ireland and France respectively. She was named European Champion Two-year old Filly at the Cartier Racing Awards. As a three-year-old she finished unplaced in both the 1000 Guineas and The Oaks but won the Irish 1,000 Guineas and the Pretty Polly Stakes. In the latter race she defeated the leading British mare Midday by six lengths.

== Background ==
Misty for Me is a bay filly with a white blaze bred in Ireland by March Thoroughbreds, one of the breeding divisions of John Magnier's Coolmore Stud organisation. She was sired by the 2001 Epsom Derby winner Galileo out of the American-bred mare Butterfly Cove, a half-sister of the 1999 European Champion Two-Year-Old Fasliyev. Like most Coolmore horses she was sent into training with Aidan O'Brien at Ballydoyle. For racing purposes Misty for Me was registered as being owned either by Michael Tabor or by a partnership of Tabor, Derrick Smith and Mrs John Magnier.

== Racing career ==
=== 2010: two-year-old season ===
Misty for Me made little impression on her debut at the Curragh in June. Starting at odds of 20/1, she finished tenth of the twelve runners in a maiden race behind her stable companion Wild Wind. At the same course a month later, she recorded her first win when taking an eighteen-runner maiden race at the same course. In August she was moved up to Group Two for the Debutante Stakes over the same course and distance. Ridden by Seamie Heffernan she led in the final quarter mile before finishing a length second to the Jessica Harrington-trained Laughing Lashes, three lengths ahead of her stable companion Together.

Three weeks after the Debutante Stakes, Misty for Me was stepped up to Group One level for the six furlong Moyglare Stud Stakes, Ireland's most important race for two-year-old fillies. She started at odds of 10/1 in a field of twelve runners which included Wild Wind, Laughing Lashes, Together and the unbeaten British filly Memory, who was made evens favourite. Johnny Murtagh chose to ride Together in preference to Misty for Me, who was described as being "a bit idle" in gallops at Ballydoyle. Seamie Heffernan sent Misty for Me into the lead and although she was strongly challenged in the closing stages, she stayed on well to win by a length from Laughing Lashes. After the race O'Brien praised the filly's determination and said that she was "crying out" for longer distances. Misty for Me was ruled out of an intended run in the Fillies' Mile, in which she was scheduled to meet the leading English fillies White Moonstone and Theysken's Theory, after sustaining a bruised foot.

At the Prix de l'Arc de Triomphe meeting at Longchamp in October, Misty for Me challenged for the Prix Marcel Boussac, France's most prestigious race for two-year-old fillies. Not only was the Marcel Boussac her first race abroad, it was also the first time she had run anywhere but her home track at the Curragh. Ridden by Johnny Murtagh, Misty for Me raced behind the leader Mambia before taking the lead in the straight. Two hundred metres from the finish she was overtaken by the odds-on favourite Helleborine, but came back to regain the lead and win by a length. The future Group One winners Danedream and Galikova (Prix Vermeille) were among the unplaced runners. Following the race, Murtagh explained that he had been worried by the soft ground but that Misty for Me had settled well and "found plenty" under pressure, adding that she was a "grand filly" and a good classic prospect. The Irish bookmakers Paddy Power responded by making her favourite for the following year's 1000 Guineas.

=== 2011: three-year-old season ===
On her first appearance of 2011, Misty for Me was sent to Newmarket for the Classic 1000 Guineas on 1 May without a prep race. Starting at odds of 9/1 she tracked the leaders until three furlongs from the finish, but then weakened to finish eleventh of the eighteen runners behind Blue Bunting and Together. Three weeks after her poor run at Newmarket, Misty for Me returned to the Curragh for the Irish 1,000 Guineas. Ridden by Seamie Heffernan, she was made 5/1 third favourite behind Together and the John Oxx-trained Emiyna. Misty for Me was among the leaders throughout but was only fourth behind Together entering the final furlong. She stayed on strongly to take the lead near the finish and won by three quarters of a length from Together, with Laughing Lashes a length away in third.

On 3 June, as planned, Misty for Me was sent back to England and was moved up in distance to contest the Oaks over one and a half miles. She started third favourite behind Blue Bunting and Wonder of Wonders. After running in third place for much of the way she weakened in the closing stages to finish fifth, beaten seven and a half lengths by Dancing Rain. Three weeks later, Misty for Me ran in the Group One Pretty Polly Stakes over ten furlongs at the Curragh. In this race she was matched against the British-trained five-year-old Midday, winner of the Breeders' Cup Filly & Mare Turf, who was made 1/3 favourite. Heffernan sent Misty for Me into the lead and set a slow pace before accelerating in the straight. In the final two furlongs she drew clear of the field and was never seriously challenged, winning by six lengths from Midday. Midday's trainer, Henry Cecil, admitted that "the winner was just too good for her."

Misty for Me started 6/4 favourite for the Group One Matron Stakes at Leopardstown in September, but after briefly taking the lead she finished third to Emulous and Together. On her final appearance, Misty for Me was sent to Kentucky to contest the Breeders' Cup Filly & Mare Turf at Churchill Downs. Ridden by Ryan Moore, she stumbled at the start and was still last of the eleven runners with a quarter of a mile to run. She was produced with a run on the outside in the straight and "rallied strongly" to finish third, beaten three-quarters of a length and a nose by Perfect Shirl and Nahrain. RTÉ considered her "a most unlucky loser".

== Assessment ==
Misty for Me was named European Champion Two-year-old filly at the Cartier Racing Awards in November 2010. In January 2011, she was ranked the best two-year-old filly of 2010 in Ireland and France by the International Classification, with a rating of 113.

== Stud record ==
In January 2012, it was announced that Misty for Me would be retired from racing to begin her breeding career. In her first season she was covered by Coolmore's Australian-bred stallion Fastnet Rock.

2013 Cover Song : filly by Fastnet Rock (AUS) – unplaced all starts to date in the U.S.A.

2014 Roly Poly (USA) : Bay filly, foaled 2 February, by War Front (USA) – Dual Group 1 winner at 3.

2015 U S Navy Flag by War Front (USA) – winner of the Middle Park Stakes and Dewhurst Stakes in 2017 and the July Cup in 2018.

== Pedigree ==
Pedigree of Misty for Me (IRE), bay filly, 2008
Sire Galileo (IRE) 1998	Sadler's Wells; 1981	Northern Dancer*	Nearctic
Sire Galileo (IRE) 1998	Sadler's Wells; 1981	Northern Dancer*	Natalma
Sire Galileo (IRE) 1998	Sadler's Wells; 1981	Fairy Bridge	Bold Reason
Sire Galileo (IRE) 1998	Sadler's Wells; 1981	Fairy Bridge	Special
Sire Galileo (IRE) 1998	Urban Sea; 1989	Miswaki	Mr. Prospector*
Sire Galileo (IRE) 1998	Urban Sea; 1989	Miswaki	Hopespringeternal
Sire Galileo (IRE) 1998	Urban Sea; 1989	Allegretta	Lombard
Sire Galileo (IRE) 1998	Urban Sea; 1989	Allegretta	Anatevka
Dam Butterfly Cove (IRE) 2001	Storm Cat; 1983	Storm Bird	Northern Dancer*
Dam Butterfly Cove (IRE) 2001	Storm Cat; 1983	Storm Bird	South Ocean
Dam Butterfly Cove (IRE) 2001	Storm Cat; 1983	Terlingua	Secretariat
Dam Butterfly Cove (IRE) 2001	Storm Cat; 1983	Terlingua	Crimson Saint
Dam Butterfly Cove (IRE) 2001	Mr. P's Princess; 1993	Mr. Prospector*	Raise a Native
Dam Butterfly Cove (IRE) 2001	Mr. P's Princess; 1993	Mr. Prospector*	Gold Digger
Dam Butterfly Cove (IRE) 2001	Mr. P's Princess; 1993	Anne Campbell	Never Bend
Dam Butterfly Cove (IRE) 2001	Mr. P's Princess; 1993	Anne Campbell	Repercussion (Family: 16-h)

- Misty for Me is inbred 3x4 to both Northern Dancer and Mr. Prospector, meaning that these stallions appear in both the third and fourth generations of her pedigree.
