= Queen Mary Stakes =

Flat horse race in Britain

- Class: Group 2
- Location: Ascot Racecourse; Ascot, England
- Inaugurated: 1921
- Race type: Flat / Thoroughbred
- Website: Ascot

Race information
- Distance: 5f (1,006 metres)
- Surface: Turf
- Track: Straight
- Qualification: Two-year-old fillies
- Weight: 9 st 2 lb
- Purse: £115,000 (2022); 1st: £68,080

Queen Mary Stakes
2026
Victorious	Senorita Bonita	Ruiva

Previous years
2025
True Love	Flowerhead	Lennilu
2024
Leovanni	Mighty Eriu	Maw Lam
2023
Crimson Advocate	Relief Rally	Beautiful Diamond
2022
Dramatised	Maylandsea	Maria Branwell
2021
Quick Suzy	Twilight Gleaming	Cheerupsleepyjean

2020-2011
2020
Campanelle	Sacred	Caroline Dale
2019
Raffle Prize	Kimari	Final Song
2018
Signora Cabello	Gossamer Wings	Shades Of Blue
2017
Heartache	Happy Like A Fool	Out Of The Flames
2016
Lady Aurelia	Al Johrah	Clem Fandango
2015
Acapulco	Easton Angel	Besharah
2014
Anthem Alexander	Tiggy Wiggy	Newsletter
2013
Rizeena	Sweet Emma Rose	One Chance
2012
Ceiling Kitty	Hoyam	Hairy Rocket
2011
Best Terms	Shumoos	Caledonia Lady

2010-2001
2010
Maqaasid	Meow	Ladies Are Forever
2009
Jealous Again	Misheer	Ceedwell
2008
Langs Lash	Shyrl	Connie Mac
2007
Elletelle	Starlit Sands	The Loan Express
2006
Gilded	Simply Perfect	Nina Blini
2005
Flashy Wings	Salut d'Amour	Bow Bridge
2004
Damson	Soar	Sharplaw Star
2003
Attraction	Catstar	Majestic Desert
2002
Romantic Liason	Never A Doubt	Rag Top
2001
Queen's Logic	Sophisticat	Roundtree

2000-1991
2000
Romantic Myth	Al Ihsas	Little Firefly
1999
Shining Hour	Rowaasi	Warrior Queen
1998
Bint Allayl	Pipalong	Coralita
1997
Nadwah	Crazee Mental	Daunting Lady
1996
Dance Parade	Dame Laura	Moonshine Girl
1995
Blue Duster	Dance Sequence	My Melody Parkes
1994
Gay Gallanta	Myself	Hoh Magic
1993
Risky	Snipe Hall	Elrafa Ah
1992
Lyric Fantasy	Mystic Goddess	Toocando
1991
Marling	Culture Vulture	Central City

1990-1988
1990
On Tiptoes	It's All Academic	Furajet
1989
Dead Certain	Please Believe Me	Performing Arts
1988
Gloriella	Bocas Rose	Honoria

The Queen Mary Stakes is a Group 2 flat horse race in Great Britain open to two-year-old fillies. It is run at Ascot over a distance of 5 furlongs (1,006 metres), and it is scheduled to take place each year in June.

The event is named after Mary of Teck. It was established in 1921, and the inaugural running was won by Wild Mint.

The present system of race grading was introduced in 1971, and for a period the Queen Mary Stakes was classed at Group 3 level. It was promoted to Group 2 status in 2004. The Queen Mary Stakes is now staged on day two of the five-day Royal Ascot meeting.

== Records ==
Leading jockey (5 wins):

- Sir Gordon Richards – Supervisor (1932), Maureen (1933), Caretta (1934), Snowberry (1939), Apparition (1946)

Leading trainer (7 wins):

- Fred Darling – Margeritta (1924), Supervisor (1932), Maureen (1933), Caretta (1934), Snowberry (1939), Sun Chariot (1941), Apparition (1946)

== Winners ==
Year	Winner	Jockey	Trainer	Time
1921	Wild Mint	Joe Shatwell	Harry Cottrill	1:03.20
1922	Cos	George Hulme	Richard Dawson	1:02.60
1923	Mumtaz Mahal	George Hulme	Richard Dawson	1:01.80
1924	Margeritta	George Archibald Sr.	Fred Darling	1:03.00
1925	Aloysia	Joe Childs	William Jarvis	1:02.40
1926	Book Law	Bobby Jones	Alec Taylor Jr.	1:10.00
1927	Stadacona	Harry Beasley Jr.	Atty Persse	1:02.20
1928	Arabella	Charlie Smirke	Peter Gilpin	1:04.00
1929	Qurrat-al-Ain	Michael Beary	Richard Dawson	1:03.00
1930	Atbara	Rufus Beasley	Peter Gilpin	1:02.80
1931	Diamalt	Harry Wragg	Bertie Holland	1:04.00
1932	Supervisor	Sir Gordon Richards	Fred Darling	1:01.80
1933	Maureen	Sir Gordon Richards	Fred Darling	1:04.00
1934	Caretta	Sir Gordon Richards	Fred Darling	1:04.20
1935	Fair Ranee	Steve Donoghue	Richard Dawson	1:06.20
1936	Night Song	Rufus Beasley	Cecil Boyd-Rochfort	1:03.40
1937	Queen of Simla	Charlie Smirke	Frank Butters	1:03.60
1938	Belle Travers	Doug Smith	Frank Butters	1:04.00
1939	Snowberry	Sir Gordon Richards	Fred Darling	1:04.40
1940	No Race
1941 (Note: The 1941 race was run at Newmarket)	Sun Chariot	Harry Wragg	Fred Darling	1:05.00
1942 (Note: The 1942 race was run at Newmarket)	Samovar	Michael Beary	Atty Persse	1:00.20
1943 (Note: The 1943 race was run at Newmarket)	Fair Fame	Freddy Lane	Harvey Leader	1:02.40
1944 (Note: The 1944 race was run at Newmarket)	Sun Stream	Harry Wragg	Walter Earl	1:00.00
1945	Rivaz	Charlie Elliott	Frank Butters	1:02.20
1946	Apparition	Sir Gordon Richards	Fred Darling	1:04.80
1947	Masaka	Charlie Smirke	Frank Butters	1:02.40
1948	Coronation V	Charlie Elliott	Charles Semblat	1:04.40
1949	Diableretta	Rae Johnstone	Frank Butters	1:02.80
1950	Rose Linnet	Doug Smith	Reg Day	1:05.00
1951	Primavera	Manny Mercer	Jack Jarvis	1:04.20
1952	Devon Vintage	Manny Mercer	Jack Colling	1:05.40
1953	Sybil's Niece	Manny Mercer	Jack Jarvis	1:06.40
1954	Bride Elect	Frank Barlow	Humphrey Cottrill	1:05.40
1955	Weeber	Scobie Breasley	Peter Nelson	1:02.98
1956	Pharsalia	Lester Piggott	Humphrey Cottrill	1:04.07
1957	Abelia	Lester Piggott	Noel Murless	1:01.80
1958	A.20	Bill Rickaby	Fergie Sutherland	1:03.43
1959	Paddy's Sister	George Moore	Paddy Prendergast	1:02.05
1960	Cynara	Harry Carr	Harry Wragg	1:03.78
1961	My Dream	Doug Smith	Geoffrey Brooke	1:04.78
1962	Shot Silk	Doug Smith	Geoffrey Brooke	1:04.30
1963	Lerida	Jimmy Lindley	John Waugh	1:06.18
1964	Brassia	Jack Purtell	Vincent O'Brien	1:02.86
1965	Visp	Jimmy Lindley	Jack Watts	1:03.41
1966	Petite Path	Jimmy Lindley	R Mason	1:02.45
1967	Sovereign	Ron Hutchinson	Harry Wragg	1:02.60
1968	Grizel	Bill Williamson	Paddy Prendergast	1:02.60
1969	Farfalla	Tony Murray	Doug Smith	1:04.10
1970	Cawston's Pride	Brian Taylor	Freddie Maxwell	1:01.52
1971	Waterloo	Eddie Hide	Bill Watts	1:06.98
1972	Truly Thankful	Tony Murray	Ryan Price	1:03.51
1973	Bitty Girl	Bruce Raymond	Michael Jarvis	1:06.48
1974	Highest Trump	Johnny Roe	Dermot Weld	1:02.24
1975	Rory's Rocket	Tony Murray	Peter Ashworth	1:02.39
1976	Cramond	Joe Mercer	Ron Boss	1:03.29
1977	Amaranda	Lester Piggott	Harry Wragg	1:04.21
1978	Greenland Park	Harry White	William Hastings-Bass	1:02.50
1979	Abeer	Willie Carson	Jeremy Tree	1:02.70
1980	Pushy	Joe Mercer	Henry Cecil	1:02.90
1981	Fly Baby	Paul Cook	Richard Hannon Sr.	1:02.70
1982	Widaad	Walter Swinburn	Michael Stoute	1:02.70
1983	Night of Wind	Bruce Raymond	Matt McCormack	1:01.90
1984	Hi-Tech Girl	Greville Starkey	Peter Makin	1:02.23
1985	Gwydion	Steve Cauthen	Henry Cecil	1:00.94
1986	Forest Flower	Pat Eddery	Ian Balding	1:01.76
1987	Princess Athena	Willie Carson	David Elsworth	1:04.94
1988	Gloriella	John Reid	John McLoughlin	1:01.43
1989	Dead Certain	Steve Cauthen	David Elsworth	1:01.54
1990	On Tiptoes	Dean McKeown	Jim Leigh	1:02.45
1991	Marling	Gary Carter	Geoff Wragg	1:02.51
1992	Lyric Fantasy	Michael Roberts	Richard Hannon Sr.	0:59.72
1993	Risky	Walter Swinburn	Richard Hannon Sr.	1:04.75
1994	Gay Gallanta	Walter Swinburn	Michael Stoute	1:01.65
1995	Blue Duster	Michael Kinane	David Loder	1:00.98
1996	Dance Parade	Michael Kinane	Paul Cole	1:01.94
1997	Nadwah	Richard Hills	Peter Walwyn	1:01.39
1998	Bint Allayl	Frankie Dettori	Mick Channon	1:02.27
1999	Shining Hour	Jimmy Fortune	Peter Chapple-Hyam	1:01.83
2000	Romantic Myth	Kevin Darley	Tim Easterby	1:02.75
2001	Queen's Logic	Steve Drowne	Mick Channon	1:02.73
2002	Romantic Liaison	Pat Eddery	Brian J. Meehan	1:00.61
2003	Attraction	Kevin Darley	Mark Johnston	1:00.46
2004	Damson	Jamie Spencer	David Wachman	1:01.81
2005 (Note: The 2005 running took place at York)	Flashy Wings	Ted Durcan	Mick Channon	0:58.18
2006	Gilded	Richard Hughes	Richard Hannon Sr.	1:03.06
2007	Elletelle	Johnny Murtagh	Ger Lyons	1:00.64
2008	Langs Lash	Alan Munro	Mick Quinlan	1:00.87
2009	Jealous Again	John Velazquez	Wesley Ward	1:00.53
2010	Maqaasid	Richard Hills	John Gosden	0:59.17
2011	Best Terms	Richard Hughes	Richard Hannon Sr.	1:00.22
2012	Ceiling Kitty	Richard Kingscote	Tom Dascombe	0:59.18
2013	Rizeena	James Doyle	Clive Brittain	0:59.29
2014	Anthem Alexander	Pat Smullen	Edward Lynam	0:59.15
2015	Acapulco	Ryan Moore	Wesley Ward	1:00.03
2016	Lady Aurelia	Frankie Dettori	Wesley Ward	1:00.14
2017	Heartache	Adam Kirby	Clive Cox	0:59.63
2018	Signora Cabello	Oisin Murphy	John Quinn	1:00.65
2019	Raffle Prize	Frankie Dettori	Mark Johnston	1:01.58
2020	Campanelle	Frankie Dettori	Wesley Ward	1:00.18
2021	Quick Suzy	Gary Carroll	Gavin Cromwell	1:00.01
2022	Dramatised	Daniel Tudhope	Karl Burke	0:59.34
2023	Crimson Advocate	John R. Velazquez	George Weaver	0:59.96
2024	Leovanni	James Doyle	Karl Burke	0:59.60
2025	True Love	Ryan Moore	Aidan O'Brien	0:59.65
2026	Victorious	Ryan Moore	Aidan O'Brien	0.59.19

== See also ==
- Horse racing in Great Britain
- List of British flat horse races
