= Cartier Champion Two-year-old Filly =

Award in European horse racing

The Cartier Champion Two-year-old Filly is an award in European horse racing, founded in 1991, and sponsored by Cartier SA as part of the Cartier Racing Awards. The award winner is decided by points earned in group races plus the votes cast by British racing journalists and readers of the Racing Post and The Daily Telegraph newspapers.

== Records ==
Leading trainer (8 wins):

- Aidan O'Brien – Rumplestiltskin (2005), Misty for Me (2010), Maybe (2011), Minding (2015), Happily (2017), Opera Singer (2023), Lake Victoria (2024), Precise (2025)

Leading owner (8 wins):

- Sue Magnier – Rumplestiltskin (2005), Misty for Me (2010), Maybe (2011), Minding (2015), Happily (2017), Opera Singer (2023), Lake Victoria (2024), Precise (2025)
- Michael Tabor – Rumplestiltskin (2005), Misty for Me (2010), Maybe (2011), Minding (2015), Happily (2017), Opera Singer (2023), Lake Victoria (2024), Precise (2025)

=== Winners ===
Year	Horse	Bred	Trained	Trainer	Owner
1991	Culture Vulture	USA	GB	Paul Cole	Chris Wright
1992	Lyric Fantasy	IRE	GB	Richard Hannon Sr.	Lord Carnarvon
1993	Lemon Souffle	GB	GB	Richard Hannon Sr.	Lord Carnarvon
1994	Gay Gallanta	USA	GB	Michael Stoute	Cheveley Park Stud
1995	Blue Duster	USA	GB	David Loder	Sheikh Mohammed
1996	Pas de Reponse	USA	FR	Criquette Head	Wertheimer et Frère
1997	Embassy	GB	GB	David Loder	Sheikh Mohammed
1998	Bint Allayl	GB	GB	Mick Channon	Sheikh Ahmed Al Maktoum
1999	Torgau	IRE	GB	Giles Bravery	T T Partnership
2000	Superstar Leo	IRE	GB	William Haggas	Superstar Leo Partnership
2001	Queen's Logic	IRE	GB	Mick Channon	Jaber Abdullah
2002	Six Perfections	FR	FR	Pascal Bary	Niarchos family
2003	Attraction	GB	GB	Mark Johnston	Guy Innes-Ker, 10th Duke of Roxburghe
2004	Divine Proportions	USA	FR	Pascal Bary	Niarchos family
2005	Rumplestiltskin	IRE	IRE	Aidan O'Brien	Magnier, Tabor and Niarchos
2006	Finsceal Beo	IRE	IRE	Jim Bolger	Michael Ryan
2007	Natagora	FR	FR	Pascal Bary	Stefan Friborg
2008	Rainbow View	USA	GB	John Gosden	George Strawbridge
2009	Special Duty	GB	FR	Criquette Head	Khalid Abdullah
2010	Misty for Me	IRE	IRE	Aidan O'Brien	Magnier, Tabor and Smith
2011	Maybe	IRE	IRE	Aidan O'Brien	Magnier, Tabor and Smith
2012	Certify	USA	GB	Mahmood Al Zarooni	Godolphin
2013	Chriselliam	IRE	GB	Charles Hills	Carson, Asprey & Wright
2014	Tiggy Wiggy	IRE	GB	Richard Hannon Jr.	Potensis Ltd, C Giles & Merriebelle Stables
2015	Minding	IRE	IRE	Aidan O'Brien	Smith, Magnier and Tabor
2016	Lady Aurelia	USA	USA	Wesley Ward	Stonestreet Stables, G Bolton & P Leidel
2017	Happily	IRE	IRE	Aidan O'Brien	Smith, Magnier and Tabor
2018	Skitter Scatter	USA	IRE	P J Prendergast	Anthony & Sonia Rogers
2019	Quadrilateral	GB	GB	Roger Charlton	Khalid Abdullah
2020	Pretty Gorgeous	FR	IRE	Joseph Patrick O'Brien	John C Oxley
2021	Inspiral	GB	GB	John Gosden and Thady Gosden	Cheveley Park Stud
2022	Lezoo	GB	GB	Ralph Beckett	Marc Chan & Andrew Rosen
2023	Opera Singer	USA	IRE	Aidan O'Brien	Magnier, Tabor, Smith & Westerberg
2024	Lake Victoria	IRE	IRE	Aidan O'Brien	Tabor, Smith and Magnier
2025	Precise	IRE	IRE	Aidan O'Brien	Magnier, Tabor, Smith & Westerberg
