= Princess Margaret Stakes =

Flat horse race in Great Britain

- Class: Group 3
- Location: Ascot Racecourse; Ascot, England
- Inaugurated: 1946
- Race type: Flat / Thoroughbred
- Sponsor: Sodexo
- Website: Ascot

Race information
- Distance: 6f (1,207 metres)
- Surface: Turf
- Track: Straight
- Qualification: Two-year-old fillies
- Weight: 9 st 2 lb Penalties; 5 lb for G1 / G2 winners 3 lb for G3 winners
- Purse: £70,000 (2025); 1st: £39,697

Princess Margaret Stakes
2026
Moonrise	Dee's Funny Girl	Velozee

Previous years
2025
Fitzella	Staya	Bella Lyra
2024
Simmering	Betty Clover	Tales Of The Heart
2023
Sacred Angel	Pretty Crystal	Symbology
2022
Lezoo	Kinta	Breege
2021
Zain Claudette	Desert Dreamer	Delmona

2020-2011
2020
Santosha	Hala Hala Hala	Caroline Dale
2019
Under The Stars	Aroha	Living In The Past
2018
Angel's Hideaway	Royal Intervention	The Mackem Bullet
2017
Nyaleti	Dance Diva	Musical Art
2016
Fair Eva	Kilmah	Dainty Dandy
2015
Besharah	Great Page	Whatdoiwantthatfor
2014
Osaila	Pastoral Girl	Explosive Lady
2013
Princess Noor	Queen Catrine	Along Again
2012
Maureen	Sandreamer	Hoyam
2011
Angels Will Fall	Regal Realm	Miss Lahar

2010-2001
2010
Soraaya	Margot Did	Perfect Tribute
2009
Lady Of The Desert	Full Mandate	Sand Vixen
2008
African Skies	Rosabee	Excellerator
2007
Visit	Reel Gift	Sweepstake
2006
Scarlet Runner	Vital Statistics	Simply Perfect
2005
Mixed Blessing	Nidhaal	Nannina
2004
Soar	Valentin	Kissing Lights
2003
River Belle	Rosehearty	Voile
2002
Russian Rhythm	Luvah Girl	Nasij
2001
Leggy Lou	Pastel	Parisian Elegance

2000-1991
2000
Enthused	Autumnal	Kachina Doll
1999
Saintly Speech	Journalist	Bandanna
1998
Mythical Girl	Gipsy Rose Lee	Rustic
1997
Embassy	Miss Zafonic	Filey Brigg
1996
Seebe	Moonlight Paradise	Raindancing
1995
Blue Duster	Ribot's Secret	Myrtle
1994
Tajannub	Maid For Walking	Pure Grain
1993
A Smooth One	Red Rita	Mild Rebuke
1992
Marina Park	First Veil	Lake Pleasant
1991
Bezelle	Twafeaj	Storm Ring

1990-1988
1990
Cloche D'Or	Only Yours	Zigaura
1989
Pharaoh's Delight	Routilante	La Cabrilla
1988
Muhbubh	Kerrera	Miss Secreto

The Princess Margaret Stakes is a Group 3 flat horse race in Great Britain open to two-year-old fillies. It is run at Ascot over a distance of 6 furlongs (1,207 metres), and it is scheduled to take place each year in July.

The event is named after Princess Margaret, the younger daughter of King George VI. It was established in 1946, and the inaugural running was won by Orum Blaze. For a period it was classed at Listed level, and it was promoted to Group 3 status in 1986.

The Princess Margaret Stakes is usually held at the same meeting as the King George VI and Queen Elizabeth Stakes but was run a week later in 2012.

== Records ==
Leading jockey (10 wins):

- Lester Piggott – Parrotia (1958), Parquetta (1961), Soft Angels (1965), Fleet (1966), Star Story (1968), Secret Kiss (1971), Fiery Diplomat (1972), Roussalka (1974), Al Stanza (1976), Desirable (1983)

Leading trainer (5 wins):

- Sir Michael Stoute – Circus Ring (1981), Hiaam (1986), Enthused (2000), Russian Rhythm (2002), Visit (2007)

== Winners ==
Year	Winner	Jockey	Trainer	Time
1946	Orum Blaze	Eph Smith	Henri Jelliss	1:05.60
1947	Fair Dinah	Charlie Smirke	Ted Lambton	1:05.00
1948	Azolla	Gordon Richards	Walter Nightingall	1:04.60
1949	Rose of Torridge	Doug Smith	Johnny Dines	1:03.60
1950	Par Avion	Jimmy Thompson	William Bellerby	1:03.40
1951	Pareo	Rae Johnstone	Charles Semblat	1:01.80
1952	Blue Ballad	Gordon Richards	Jack Colling	1:06.20
1953	Holwood	Doug Smith	George Colling	1:05.40
1954	Torbidora	Doug Smith	Charles Elsey	1:09.40
1955	Persian Fair	Bill Rickaby	William Smyth	1:04.86
1956	Tattinger	Edgar Britt	Charles Elsey	1:06.35
1957	Medina	Scobie Breasley	Staff Ingham	1:08.91
1958	Parrotia	Lester Piggott	Noel Murless	1:03.43
1959	Lady Advocate	Geoff Lewis	Walter Nightingall	1:05.00
1960	Abanilla	Joe Mercer	Harry Wragg	1:05.21
1961	Parquetta	Lester Piggott	Harry Wragg	1:05.28
1962	Palm Springs	Scobie Breasley	Sir Gordon Richards	1:20.91
1963	High Powered	Stan Clayton	S James	1:18.12
1964	Attitude	Joe Mercer	Dick Hern	1:16.75
1965	Soft Angels	Lester Piggott	Noel Murless	1:17.40
1966	Fleet	Lester Piggott	Noel Murless	1:18.24
1967	Photo Flash	Jimmy Lindley	Ted Leader	1:18.52
1968	Star Story	Lester Piggott	Fulke Johnson Houghton	1:18.98
1969	Red Velvet	Geoff Lewis	Peter Walwyn	1:17.97
1970	Boulevard	Eddie Hide	Sir Gordon Richards	1:18.43
1971	Secret Kiss	Lester Piggott	M Fogarty	1:16.98
1972	Fiery Diplomat	Lester Piggott	M Fogarty	1:18.59
1973	Celestial Dawn	Brian Taylor	John Winter	1:16.75
1974	Roussalka	Lester Piggott	Henry Cecil	1:18.24
1975	Outer Circle	Joe Mercer	Ian Balding	1:17.95
1976	Al Stanza	Lester Piggott	Robert Armstrong	1:16.49
1977	Sarissa	Eddie Hide	Ernie Weymes	1:17.31
1978	Devon Ditty	Greville Starkey	Harry Thomson Jones	1:17.38
1979	Luck of the Draw	Willie Carson	Dick Hern	1:16.39
1980	Tolmi	Edward Hide	Bruce Hobbs	1:16.40
1981	Circus Ring	Walter Swinburn	Michael Stoute	1:17.00
1982	Royal Heroine	Philip Robinson	Mick Ryan	1:15.55
1983	Desirable	Lester Piggott	Barry Hills	1:16.62
1984	Al Bahathri	Tony Murray	Harry Thomson Jones	1:15.61
1985	Kingscote	Pat Eddery	Jeremy Tree	1:15.83
1986	Hiaam	Walter Swinburn	Michael Stoute	1:16.17
1987	Bluebook	Steve Cauthen	Henry Cecil	1:17.53
1988	Muhbubh	Richard Hills	Harry Thomson Jones	1:17.24
1989	Pharaoh's Delight	Pat Eddery	Peter Hudson	1:15.11
1990	Cloche d'Or	Michael Roberts	Clive Brittain	1:16.00
1991	Bezelle	Pat Shanahan	Con Collins	1:15.62
1992	Marina Park	Dean McKeown	Mark Johnston	1:16.01
1993	A Smooth One	John Reid	Richard Hannon Sr.	1:18.24
1994	Tajannub	Willie Carson	Robert Armstrong	1:14.79
1995	Blue Duster	Michael Kinane	David Loder	1:16.20
1996	Seebe	Michael Hills	Ian Balding	1:14.81
1997	Embassy	Pat Eddery	David Loder	1:16.80
1998	Mythical Girl	Frankie Dettori	David Loder	1:14.70
1999	Saintly Speech	Jimmy Fortune	Peter Chapple-Hyam	1:15.50
2000	Enthused	Johnny Murtagh	Sir Michael Stoute	1:15.88
2001	Leggy Lou	Olivier Peslier	Jeremy Noseda	1:14.26
2002	Russian Rhythm	Kieren Fallon	Sir Michael Stoute	1:15.30
2003	River Belle	Kieren Fallon	Alan Jarvis	1:15.55
2004	Soar	Johnny Murtagh	James Fanshawe	1:15.60
2005 (Note: The 2005 running took place at Newbury while Ascot was closed for redevelopment)	Mixed Blessing	Kieren Fallon	Alan Jarvis	1:11.19
2006	Scarlet Runner	Kerrin McEvoy	John Dunlop	1:14.16
2007	Visit	Ryan Moore	Sir Michael Stoute	1:16.97
2008	African Skies	Neil Callan	Kevin Ryan	1:14.77
2009	Lady of the Desert	Martin Dwyer	Brian Meehan	1:14.95
2010	Soraaya	Ryan Moore	Mick Channon	1:14.86
2011	Angels Will Fall	Robert Winston	Barry Hills	1:16.80
2012	Maureen	Richard Hughes	Richard Hannon Sr.	1:14.40
2013	Princess Noor	Andrea Atzeni	Roger Varian	1:12.74
2014	Osaila	Frankie Dettori	Richard Hannon Jr.	1:14.33
2015	Besharah	Pat Cosgrave	William Haggas	1:15.84
2016	Fair Eva	Frankie Dettori	Roger Charlton	1:12.54
2017	Nyaleti	Ryan Moore	Mark Johnston	1:14.62
2018	Angel's Hideaway	Robert Havlin	John Gosden	1:14.59
2019	Under The Stars	P. J. McDonald	James Tate	1:17.04
2020	Santosha	Thomas Greatrex	David Loughnane	1:14.53
2021	Zain Claudette	Ray Dawson	Ismail Mohammed	1:13.27
2022	Lezoo	Frankie Dettori	Ralph Beckett	1:14.07
2023	Sacred Angel	Jason Hart	Charlie Johnston	1:16.53
2024	Simmering	Ryan Moore	Ollie Sangster	1:15.17
2025	Fitzella	Oisin Murphy	Hugo Palmer	1:13.98
2026	Moonrise	Oisin Murphy	Andrew Balding	1:14.18

== See also ==
- Horse racing in Great Britain
- List of British flat horse races
