= Queen's Logic =

Irish-bred Thoroughbred racehorse

- Racing silks of Mr Jaber Abdullah
- Sire: Grand Lodge
- Grandsire: Chief's Crown
- Dam: Lagrion
- Damsire: Diesis
- Sex: Mare
- Foaled: 21 February 1999
- Country: Ireland
- Colour: Chestnut
- Breeder: Kip McCreery
- Owner: Jaber Abdullah
- Trainer: Mick Channon
- Record: 5: 5-0-0
- Earnings: £198,896

Major wins
- Queen Mary Stakes (2001); Lowther Stakes (2001); Cheveley Park Stakes (2001); Fred Darling Stakes (2002)

Awards
- European Champion Two-Year-Old Filly
- Last updated on January 12, 2007

Queen's Logic is a retired Thoroughbred racehorse and active broodmare, bred in Ireland and trained in the United Kingdom. She is notable for winning the title of European Champion Two-Year-Old Filly of 2001 at the Cartier Racing Awards, and for retiring undefeated. She has been described as "the most outstanding filly to have never won a classic."

== Background ==
Queen's Logic is a chestnut mare bred in Ireland by Kip McCreery. As a yearling she was sent to the Deauville Sales, where she was bought for €152,449 by the bloodstock agent Charles Gordon-Watson on behalf of Jaber Abdullah.

Queen's Logic was sired by Grand Lodge out of the mare Lagrion. Apart from Queen's Logic, Grand Lodge (winner of the Dewhurst Stakes and the St. James's Palace Stakes) sired the winners of over six hundred races including Sinndar, Grandera and Indian Lodge (Prix du Moulin de Longchamp, Prix de la Forêt). Queen's Logic was the first important winner for her dam Lagrion, who went on to produce the 2007 European Horse of the Year Dylan Thomas and the 1000 Guineas winner Homecoming Queen.

Queen's Logic was trained throughout her career by Mick Channon at West Ilsley, Berkshire and was ridden in four of her five races by Steve Drowne.

== Racing career ==
=== 2001: two-year-old season ===
Although Mick Channon was not immediately impressed by Queen's Logic ("she was just a lump of horse flesh"), she soon showed herself to be a potentially useful filly in home exercise gallops, and was campaigned ambitiously from the start. Queen's Logic never ran in a maiden race, instead making her debut against more experienced fillies, including two winners, in a minor stakes race at Newbury in May 2001. After starting slowly, she raced behind the leaders before accelerating into the lead and winning "readily".

For her next start, she was moved straight into Group race company for the Queen Mary Stakes at Royal Ascot. Starting at 13/2 she was towards the back of the field in the early stages, before making her challenge two furlongs from the finish. She caught the Aidan O'Brien-trained Sophisticat inside the final furlong and won by half a length Although the 1,000 Guineas was more than ten months away, the bookmakers offered Queen's Logic at odds of 25/1.

Two months later, Queen's Logic returned to the racecourse for the Lowther Stakes at York. This was her first attempt at six furlongs. Apart from Sophisticat, who opposed her again, the field included the Cherry Hinton Stakes winner Silent Honor, who was made the 9/4 favourite. Queen's Logic ran her now familiar race, chasing the leaders before accelerating in the closing stages and taking the lead close home to beat Sophisticat by one and a quarter lengths, with Silent Honor third. Her price for the 1,000 Guineas was cut to 14/1 even though some felt that her sheer speed and racing style suggested that she was essentially a sprinter who might struggle over one mile.

She was given another long break before her final start of the year in the Group One Cheveley Park Stakes at Newmarket in October. This time she started favourite and produced her best performance, taking the lead two furlongs out and pulling right away from the field in a manner described by the Telegraph's correspondent as "effortless and unrelenting". At the finish she was seven lengths ahead of Sophisticat, who finished second yet again. The increasing margins of her victories over the Irish filly clearly showed the improvement Queen's Logic had made. Channon expressed his opinion that the extra quarter mile of the following year's 1,000 Guineas would be "no problem." The bookmakers were also highly impressed, cutting her price for the Guineas to 5/2 favourite.

=== 2002: three-year-old season ===
At three, Queen's Logic was aimed at the 1,000 Guineas at Newmarket. Her preparation race for the Classic was the Group Three Fred Darling Stakes at Newbury. Starting at odds of 1/3, Queen's Logic took the lead a furlong out and won comfortably by one and three quarter lengths from Roundtree. Although her performance was described as "fine, rather than scintillating", her price shortened even further to 7/4.

On the morning of the day before the 1,000 Guineas, Queen's Logic was found to be lame. Channon insisted that the injury was not serious, but he was unwilling to risk his filly and she was withdrawn from the race. A plan to run her instead in the Irish 1,000 Guineas had to be abandoned when she contracted a viral infection and began "coughing".

It was hoped that Queen's Logic could recover in time for a run in the Sussex Stakes, but the coughing returned and Channon decided that "it wouldn't be fair" to continue her training. Her retirement was announced in July.

== Race record ==
Date	Race	Dist (f)	Course	Class	Prize (£K)	Odds	Runners	Placing	Margin	Time	Jockey	Trainer
18 May 2001	Highclere Stud Fillies' Conditions Stakes	5	Newbury		6	5/2	5	1	0.75	1:05.22	Craig Williams	Mick Channon
20 June 2001	Queen Mary Stakes	5	Ascot	3	33	13/2	20	1	0.5	1:02.73	Steve Drowne	Mick Channon
23 August 2001	Lowther Stakes	6	York	2	49	7/1	8	1	1.25	1:11.01	Steve Drowne	Mick Channon
2 October 2001	Cheveley Park Stakes	6	Newmarket- Rowley	1	87	10/11	8	1	7	1:12.34	Steve Drowne	Mick Channon
20 April 2002	Fred Darling Stakes	7	Newbury	3	23	1/3	8	1	1.75	1:24.74	Steve Drowne	Mick Channon

== Assessment ==
In the International Classification for 2001, Queen's Logic was assigned a figure of 122, making her the best two-year-old filly in Europe by a margin of eight pounds. The only colt in Europe rated her superior was the Breeders' Cup Juvenile winner Johannesburg.

At the Cartier Racing Awards for 2001 she was awarded the title of European Champion Two-Year-Old Filly.

== Stud career ==
Queen's Logic has made an impact as a broodmare: her daughter Lady Of The Desert (sired by Rahy), was the highest-rated three-year-old filly in the world in the sprint division of the 2010 World Thoroughbred Rankings.

2013 SANAADH (GB) : chesnut colt, foaled 28 April, by Exceed And Excel (AUS) - won once and placed second once from three starts to date during 2015–16.

== Pedigree ==
Pedigree of Queen's Logic (IRE), chestnut mare, 1999
Sire Grand Lodge 1991	Chief's Crown; 1982	Danzig	Northern Dancer
Sire Grand Lodge 1991	Chief's Crown; 1982	Danzig	Pas de Nom
Sire Grand Lodge 1991	Chief's Crown; 1982	Six Crowns	Secretariat
Sire Grand Lodge 1991	Chief's Crown; 1982	Six Crowns	Chris Evert
Sire Grand Lodge 1991	La Papagena; 1983	Habitat	Sir Gaylord
Sire Grand Lodge 1991	La Papagena; 1983	Habitat	Little Hut
Sire Grand Lodge 1991	La Papagena; 1983	Magic Flute	Tudor Melody
Sire Grand Lodge 1991	La Papagena; 1983	Magic Flute	Filigrana
Dam Lagrion 1989	Diesis; 1980	Sharpen Up	Atan
Dam Lagrion 1989	Diesis; 1980	Sharpen Up	Rocchetta
Dam Lagrion 1989	Diesis; 1980	Doubly Sure	Reliance
Dam Lagrion 1989	Diesis; 1980	Doubly Sure	Soft Angels
Dam Lagrion 1989	Wrap It Up; 1979	Mount Hagen	Bold Bidder
Dam Lagrion 1989	Wrap It Up; 1979	Mount Hagen	Moonmadness
Dam Lagrion 1989	Wrap It Up; 1979	Doc Nan	Francis S
Dam Lagrion 1989	Wrap It Up; 1979	Doc Nan	Betty W (Family: 9c)
