= Blue Duster =

American-bred Thoroughbred racehorse

- Sire: Danzig
- Grandsire: Northern Dancer
- Dam: Blue Note
- Damsire: Habitat
- Sex: Mare
- Foaled: 3 March 1993
- Country: United States
- Colour: Bay
- Breeder: Darley Stud
- Owner: Sheikh Mohammed; Godolphin Racing
- Trainer: David Loder; Saeed bin Suroor
- Record: 9: 5-1-1
- Earnings: £174,886

Major wins
- Queen Mary Stakes (1995); Princess Margaret Stakes (1995); Cheveley Park Stakes (1995)

Awards
- European Champion Two-year-old Filly (1995)
- Last updated on June 22, 2007

Blue Duster was an American-bred, British-trained champion Thoroughbred racehorse. She was named European Champion Two-year-old Filly in the Cartier Racing Awards for 1995 and was the highest rated juvenile filly in the International Classification. In her championship season Blue Duster was unbeaten in four races including the Group One Cheveley Park Stakes, the Group Three Princess Margaret Stakes and the Group Three Queen Mary Stakes.

== Background ==
Blue Duster, a "small, neat" bay filly, was sired by Danzig mare Blue Note. She was bred in the United States by Sheikh Mohammed's Darley Stud.

Danzig, who ran only three times before his career was ended by injury, was a highly successful stallion who sired the winners of more than fifty Grade I/Group One races. His offspring include the champions Chief's Crown, Dayjur and Lure as well as the important stallion Danehill Apart from Blue Duster, Blue Note also produced her full brother Zieten, the winner of the Middle Park Stakes.

Blue Duster was originally trained by David Loder at Newmarket, Suffolk. At the end of her three-year-old season her ownership was transferred to Godolphin Racing and she was moved to the stable of Saeed bin Suroor.

== Racing career ==
=== 1995: two-year-old season ===
Blue Duster began her career in a maiden race at Sandown in May. She was made the odds on favourite and took the lead two furlongs from the finish to win by one and a quarter lengths. The runner-up, Dance Sequence, went on to win the Group Two Lowther Stakes later in the season.

A month later, Blue Duster was moved up to Group Three class for the Queen Mary Stakes at Royal Ascot. Mick Kinane held the filly up in the early stages before moving her into the lead a furlong out. She ran on strongly to win by one and a half lengths, with Dance Sequence finishing second again. The easy and "relaxed" manner of her victory led to the bookmakers offering her at odds of 14/1 for the following year's 1000 Guineas while Loder described her as his best juvenile saying that "she has always been the star." In early July, Loder won the Cherry Hinton Stakes with Applaud, a filly he described as being "six lengths" behind Blue Duster at home. Later that month Blue Duster returned to Ascot for the Princess Margaret Stakes for which she was made 30/100 favourite. She was never in danger, taking the lead a furlong out and going quickly clear to win by three and a half lengths. After her "effortless" win, her odds for the Guineas were cut to 12/1. Impressive as she had been, the opposition was not strong; none of her six rivals ever won a race of any importance.

On her final start of the season, Blue Duster was made odds-on favourite for the Cheveley Park Stakes, one of the two Group One races for two-year-old fillies run in Britain. She was held up early, before accelerating into a clear lead and recording an "impressive" two and a half length victory. Again, the strength of the opposition was questionable; only four fillies opposed her, and of these Dance Sequence was the only Group winner. The Independent called her performance " a brilliant display" and suggested that she was a potential 1000 Guineas winner whilst raising some questions about her stamina. The bookmakers responded by making her 6/1 second favourite for the Newmarket Classic behind another undefeated filly, Bosra Sham.

=== 1996: three-year-old season ===
Blue Duster remained a strong fancy for the 1000 Guineas throughout the winter, and by spring there was much anticipation of a meeting between Loder's filly and Bosra Sham. Her performances in training however, were disappointing and she was withdrawn from the race, with Loder citing the recurrence of a back problem as the reason.

Blue Duster's three-year-old debut was further delayed by training problems. She did not appear until July, when she won a minor stakes race over seven furlongs at Yarmouth to take her unbeaten run to five.

She was then given by far her most difficult race to date when she was matched against colts and older horses if the Prix Maurice de Gheest at Deauville. Blue Duster raced prominently but was unable to quicken in the closing stages and lost her perfect record, finishing fifth of the nine runners behind the European Champion Sprinter Anabaa.

On her third and final race as a three-year-old, Blue Duster again took on the best of the European sprint division in the Haydock Sprint Cup. John Reid placed her near the lead from the start and she took the lead a furlong out. She ran on strongly but was caught and overtaken close to the finish by Iktamal. In finishing second she had beaten champions such as Hever Golf Rose and Royal Applause and produced her what was arguably her best performance to date.

Although there were suggestions that she would run in the Breeders' Cup Sprint she did run again in 1996.

=== 1997: four-year-old season ===
Before the start of the 1997 season, Sheikh Mohammed transferred the ownership of Blue Duster to his Godolphin Racing team. Godolphin horses were taken to Dubai for the winter, where it was believed they would benefit from the warmer weather and excellent facilities.

Blue Duster made only two starts as a four-year-old, both of them in important sprint races. She ran third behind Royal Applause in the Duke of York Stakes at a time when the Godolphin team were badly out of form, and then finished a well-beaten seventh behind the same colt in the Cork and Orrery Stakes at Royal Ascot.

== Race record ==
Date	Race	Dist (f)	Course	Class	Prize (£K)	Odds	Runners	Placing	Margin	Time	Jockey	Trainer
29 May 1995	EBF Maiden Fillies Stakes	5	Sandown	M	4	8/11	9	1	1.25	1:02.52	Michael Kinane	David Loder
21 June 1995	Queen Mary Stakes	5	Ascot	3	25	7/4	12	1	1.5	1:00.98	Michael Kinane	David Loder
22 July 1995	Princess Margaret Stakes	6	Ascot	3	21	30/100	7	1	3.5	1:16.20	Michael Kinane	David Loder
26 September 1995	Cheveley Park Stakes	6	Newmarket Rowley	1	84	4/5	5	1	2.5	1:12.78	Michael Kinane	David Loder
21 July 1996	Tunstall Fillies' Stakes	7	Yarmouth		4	4/5	5	1	1.75	1:24.70	Michael Kinane	David Loder
11 August 1996	Prix Maurice de Gheest	6.5	Deauville	1	65	51/10	9	5	7.5	1:19.00	Pat Eddery	David Loder
7 September 1996	Haydock Sprint Cup	6	Haydock	1	77	9/1	11	2	1	1:09.92	John Reid	David Loder
15 May 1997	Duke of York Stakes	6	York	3	28	100/30	10	3	4.25	1:12.13	Frankie Dettori	Saeed bin Suroor
19 June 1997	Cork and Orrery Stakes	6	Ascot	3	34	13/2	23	7	4	1:15.33	Frankie Dettori	Saeed bin Suroor

== Assessment ==
In the 1995 Cartier Racing Awards Blue Duster was named European Champion Two-year-old Filly.

When the International Classification for 1995's two-year-olds was released in January 1996, Blue Duster was officially rated the best filly in Europe with a rating of 119.

== Stud career ==
Blue Duster was retired to her owner's Darley Stud. She has produced at least nine foals. Her only recorded winner has been a filly named Blue Symphony by Darshaan who won a handicap race at Brighton in 2003.

== Pedigree ==
Pedigree of Blue Duster (USA), bay mare, 1993
Sire Danzig (USA) 1977	Northern Dancer; 1961	Nearctic	Nearco
Sire Danzig (USA) 1977	Northern Dancer; 1961	Nearctic	Lady Angela
Sire Danzig (USA) 1977	Northern Dancer; 1961	Natalma	Native Dancer
Sire Danzig (USA) 1977	Northern Dancer; 1961	Natalma	Almahmoud
Sire Danzig (USA) 1977	Pas de Nom; 1968	Admirals Voyage	Crafty Admiral
Sire Danzig (USA) 1977	Pas de Nom; 1968	Admirals Voyage	Olympia Lou
Sire Danzig (USA) 1977	Pas de Nom; 1968	Petitioner	Petition
Sire Danzig (USA) 1977	Pas de Nom; 1968	Petitioner	Steady Aim
Dam Blue Note (FR) 1985	Habitat; 1966	Sir Gaylord	Turn-To
Dam Blue Note (FR) 1985	Habitat; 1966	Sir Gaylord	Somethingroyal
Dam Blue Note (FR) 1985	Habitat; 1966	Little Hut	Occupy
Dam Blue Note (FR) 1985	Habitat; 1966	Little Hut	Savage Beauty
Dam Blue Note (FR) 1985	Balsamique; 1973	Tourangeau	Val de Loir
Dam Blue Note (FR) 1985	Balsamique; 1973	Tourangeau	Torbella
Dam Blue Note (FR) 1985	Balsamique; 1973	Bruyere	Traffic
Dam Blue Note (FR) 1985	Balsamique; 1973	Bruyere	Becon (Family: 16)
