= Happily (horse) =

Irish-bred Thoroughbred racehorse

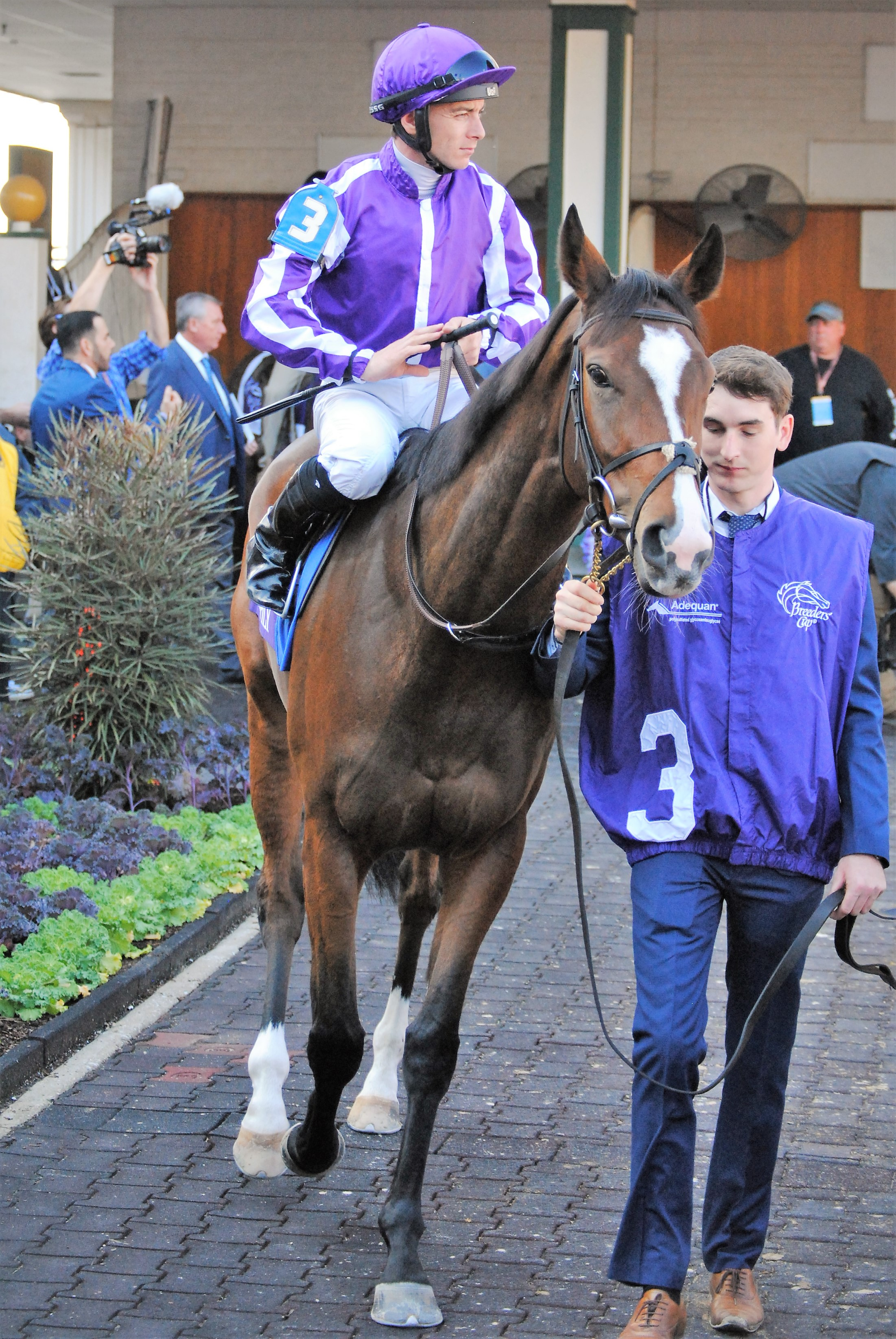
- Happily at the 2018 Breeders' Cup
- Sire: Galileo
- Grandsire: Sadler's Wells
- Dam: You'resothrilling
- Damsire: Storm Cat
- Sex: Mare
- Foaled: 27 February 2015
- Country: Ireland
- Colour: Bay
- Breeder: You'resothrilling Syndicate
- Owner: Derrick Smith, Susan Magnier & Michael Tabor
- Trainer: Aidan O'Brien
- Record: 14: 4-2-2
- Earnings: £629,413

Major wins
- Silver Flash Stakes (2017); Moyglare Stud Stakes (2017); Prix Jean-Luc Lagardère (2017)

Awards
- Cartier Champion Two-year-old Filly

Happily (foaled 27 February 2015) is an Irish Thoroughbred racehorse. As a two-year-old in 2017 she was one of best of her generation in Europe, winning four of her seven races including two at Group 1 level. After finishing unplaced on her debut she won a maiden race and the Group 3 Silver Flash Stakes before running second to her stablemate Magical in the Debutante Stakes. She reversed the form to beat Magical in the Moyglare Stud Stakes and then defeated male opposition to take the Prix Jean-Luc Lagardère. At the end of the season she was voted Cartier Champion Two-year-old Filly. In the following year she was placed in the 1000 Guineas, Irish 1,000 Guineas and Sun Chariot Stakes.

== Background ==
Happily is a bay filly with a white blaze bred in Ireland by the You'resothrilling Syndicate. She was sired by Galileo, who won the Derby, Irish Derby and King George VI and Queen Elizabeth Stakes in 2001. Galileo became one of the world's leading stallions and has been champion sire of Great Britain and Ireland nine times. His other progeny include Cape Blanco, Frankel, Golden Lilac, Nathaniel, New Approach, Rip Van Winkle and Ruler of the World. Happily's dam You'resothrilling was a sister of the leading racehorse and stallion Giant's Causeway. You'resothrilling was trained by Aidan O'Brien and won the Cherry Hinton Stakes in 2007. Happily is her fifth foal, the first four being Marvellous, Gleneagles, Coolmore (C L Weld Park Stakes) and The Taj Mahal (Zipping Classic).

During her racing career Happily has been trained by Aidan O'Brien at Ballydoyle. She is owned by John Magnier's Coolmore Stud partnership (officially Michael Tabor, Susan Magnier and Derrick Smith), usually racing in the purple and white colours of Derrick Smith. She usually races in a tongue-tie.

== Racing career ==
=== 2017: two-year-old season ===
Happily made her debut in a maiden race over seven furlongs at Leopardstown Racecourse on 8 June in which she started at odds of 5/1. Ridden by her trainer's son Donnacha O'Brien she made little impact and came home seventh of the eleven runners, ten lengths behind her winning stablemate September. Three weeks later, with O'Brien again in the saddle, the filly started odds-on favourite for a similar event at the Curragh and recorded her first success as she took the lead inside the final furlong to win by one and three quarter lengths from the Ger Lyons-trained Shalailah. Ryan Moore took over the ride when the filly was stepped up in class for the Group 3 Silver Flash Stakes at Leopardstown on 27 July. Starting the 8/11 favourite against four opponents she took the lead a furlong out and drew away to win "easily" by five lengths, with Shalailah again being her closest pursuer. After the race Aidan O'Brien said "You'd be delighted with that. She looks like she's come forward again. She's lovely and Ryan is very happy with her. She picked them up very easily."

On 20 August at the Curragh Happily faced a rematch with September in the Group 2 Debutante Stakes, with the latter being marginally preferred in the betting. A third O'Brien filly, named Magical set off in front with Moore settling Happily in second place. Although she made some progress in the closing stages she was never able to get on terms with Magical and was beaten one and a quarter lengths by her less-fancied stablemate. Happily, Magical and September met again in the Group 1 Moyglare Stud Stakes three weeks later with Happily, ridden by Donnacha O'Brien being the least fancied of the Ballydoyle trio on 13/2. The favourite for the race was the Jessica Harrington-trained Alpha Centauri who had won the Fillies' Sprint Stakes and finished second in the Albany Stakes at Royal Ascot. As in the Debutante Stakes, Happily settled in second place behind Magical before making her challenge in the final furlong. On this occasion however she was able to catch her stablemate on the line and prevailed by a short head with a gap of more than three lengths back to September in third. Aidan O'Brien commented "Happily toughed it out and Magical ran a stormer as well. Donnacha gave her a great ride. He was delighted to be on Happily" before naming the Prix Marcel Boussac and the Fillies' Mile as possible future targets.

At Chantilly Racecourse on 1 October, Happily was matched against male opposition in the Group 1 Prix Jean-Luc Lagardère over 1600 metres. Ridden by Moore she went off the 6/5 favourite ahead of five rivals including Masar (Solario Stakes), Olmedo (runner-up in the Prix des Chênes) and the Listed race winners Mythical Magic and Francesco Bere. She raced towards the rear of the field as Mythical Magic set the pace before moving upon the outside in the straight. The filly gained the advantage inside the last 100 metres and wone by one and a quarter lengths and a short neck from Olmedo and Masar. Ryan Moore said "We were confident she would get the trip well. We started racing a long way from home and she showed a great will to win. For a filly to beat the colts is a good thing for the future".

On her final appearance of the season Happily was sent to California to contest the Breeders' Cup Juvenile Fillies Turf at Del Mar Racetrack on 3 November. Racing on much firmer ground than she had previously encountered she started favourite but dropped out of contention after failing to obtain a clear run in the last quarter mile and finished last of the sixteen runners.

=== 2018: three-year-old season ===
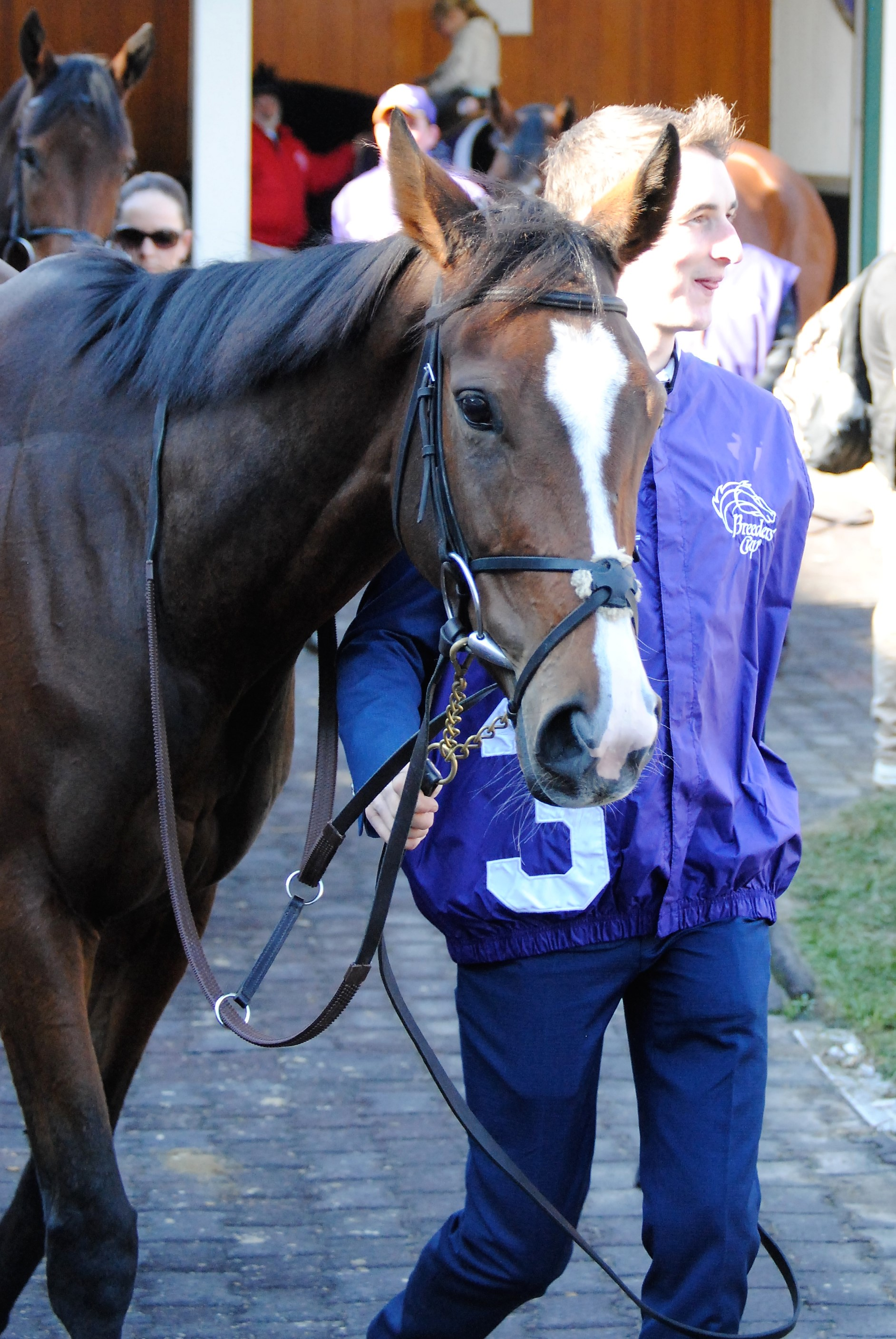
Happily at the 2018 Breeders' Cup

On her three-year-old debut Happily started the 11/4 favourite for the 1000 Guineas over the Rowley Mile at Newmarket Racecourse on 6 May. After racing in mid-division she made steady progress without looking likely to win and came home third behind Billesdon Brook and Laurens. Three weeks later in the Irish 1,000 Guineas at the Curragh she went off the 5/4 favourite but came home third behind Alpha Centauri and the pacemaker Could It Be Love. She was then sent to Chantilly for the Prix de Diane and finished fourth behind Laurens in a "blanket finish" which saw the first five separated by half a length. Happily took on male opposition and older horses in the Eclipse Stakes at Sandown Park in July and came home fifth of the seven runners behind Roaring Lion. After a break of over two months she returned in the Matron Stakes at Leopardstown and came home fifth behind Laurens. On 6 October the filly started at odds of 8/1 for the Sun Chariot Stakes at Newmarket. She took the lead in the early stages before settling in second behind Laurens and after a prolonged struggle with the British-trained filly she was beaten a head into second place. Two weeks later the filly was entered in the Queen Elizabeth II Stakes at Ascot but was withdrawn from the contest after becoming distressed and unruly in the starting stalls. On her final run of the season, Happily was sent to Churchill Downs for the Breeders' Cup Mile on 3 November. She finished eighth of the fourteen runners, beaten three and a half lengths by the winner Expert Eye.

== Assessment and awards ==
On 16 November 2017 at the Cartier Racing Awards, Happily was named Champion two-year-old filly.

== Pedigree ==
Pedigree of Happily, bay filly, 2015
Sire Galileo (IRE) b. 1998	Sadler's Wells (USA) b. 1981	Northern Dancer* b. 1961	Nearctic
Sire Galileo (IRE) b. 1998	Sadler's Wells (USA) b. 1981	Northern Dancer* b. 1961	Natalma
Sire Galileo (IRE) b. 1998	Sadler's Wells (USA) b. 1981	Fairy Bridge b. 1975	Bold Reason
Sire Galileo (IRE) b. 1998	Sadler's Wells (USA) b. 1981	Fairy Bridge b. 1975	Special
Sire Galileo (IRE) b. 1998	Urban Sea (USA) ch. 1989	Miswaki ch. 1978	Mr. Prospector
Sire Galileo (IRE) b. 1998	Urban Sea (USA) ch. 1989	Miswaki ch. 1978	Hopespringseternal
Sire Galileo (IRE) b. 1998	Urban Sea (USA) ch. 1989	Allegretta ch. 1978	Lombard
Sire Galileo (IRE) b. 1998	Urban Sea (USA) ch. 1989	Allegretta ch. 1978	Anatevka
Dam You'resothrilling (USA) b. 2005	Storm Cat (USA) b. 1983	Storm Bird b. 1978	Northern Dancer*
Dam You'resothrilling (USA) b. 2005	Storm Cat (USA) b. 1983	Storm Bird b. 1978	South Ocean
Dam You'resothrilling (USA) b. 2005	Storm Cat (USA) b. 1983	Terlingua ch. 1976	Secretariat
Dam You'resothrilling (USA) b. 2005	Storm Cat (USA) b. 1983	Terlingua ch. 1976	Crimson Saint
Dam You'resothrilling (USA) b. 2005	Mariah's Storm (USA) b. 1991	Rahy ch. 1985	Blushing Groom
Dam You'resothrilling (USA) b. 2005	Mariah's Storm (USA) b. 1991	Rahy ch. 1985	Glorious Song
Dam You'resothrilling (USA) b. 2005	Mariah's Storm (USA) b. 1991	Immense b. 1979	Roberto
Dam You'resothrilling (USA) b. 2005	Mariah's Storm (USA) b. 1991	Immense b. 1979	Imsodear (Family 11)

Note: b. = Bay, br. = Brown, ch. = Chestnut

* Happily is inbred 3 × 4 to the stallion Northern Dancer, meaning that Northern Dancer appears once in the third generation and once in the fourth generation of his pedigree.
