= Rumplestiltskin (horse) =

Irish-bred Thoroughbred racehorse

- Racing colours of Susan Magnier
- Sire: Danehill
- Grandsire: Danzig
- Dam: Monevassia
- Damsire: Mr. Prospector
- Sex: Mare
- Foaled: 17 February 2003
- Country: Ireland
- Colour: Bay
- Breeder: Quay Bloodstock and Niarchos Family
- Owner: Sue Magnier, Michael Tabor, Niarchos Family
- Trainer: Aidan O'Brien
- Record: 7:5-0-1
- Earnings: £350,807

Major wins
- Debutante Stakes (2005); Moyglare Stud Stakes (2005); Prix Marcel Boussac (2005)

Awards
- European Champion Two-Year-Old Filly (2005)
- Last updated on 20 September 2006

Rumplestiltskin is a retired Irish champion Thoroughbred racehorse. In 2005 she was named European Champion Two-Year-Old Filly at the Cartier Racing Awards and was the highest rated filly in the International Classification. In her championship season she won five of her six races including two Group One races, the Moyglare Stud Stakes in Ireland and the Prix Marcel Boussac France. She was retired after one unsuccessful start as a three-year-old.

== Background ==
Rumplestiltskin was sired by Danehill out of the mare Monevassia. She was bred in Ireland by the Niarchos Family, which owned her dam, and Quay Bloodstock, a division of the Coolmore Stud. Rumplestiltskin was sent into training with Aidan O'Brien at Ballydoyle.

Rumplestilstkin's sire Danehill was one of the most successful stallions of the last twenty years, producing the winners of more than one thousand races including 156 at Group One/Grade I level. Among his best offspring are Dylan Thomas, Duke of Marmalade, Rock of Gibraltar George Washington and North Light. Monevassia, Rumplestiltskin's dam failed to win a race. She was however, a daughter of the outstanding racemare Miesque and was thus a sister to the successful racehorse and sire Kingmambo and the multiple Group One winning filly East of the Moon. Rumplestiltskin is inbred 3x4 to Northern Dancer and is separately inbred 4x4 to Northern Dancer's dam Natalma. (see below)

== Racing career ==
=== 2005: two-year-old season ===
Rumplestiltskin's first race was a maiden at Naas in May, for which she started the odds-on favourite. She tracked the leaders before finishing strongly to lead near the finish and win by half a length from Always A Star. Three weeks later at the same venue she was stepped up to Listed class and won the Swordlestown Stud Sprint Stakes by a length and a half. In this race she was ridden for the first time by Kieren Fallon, who partnered her in all her subsequent starts. O'Brien expressed his satisfaction that the filly had won despite her obvious lack of experience and his belief that she would make further progress.

In 2005 Ascot was closed for renovations and the Royal meeting was moved to York. Rumplestiltskin was sent there for the Albany Stakes, her first race at Group Three level. She tracked the leaders but could make no progress in the closing stages and finished third, four and a half lengths behind the comfortable winner La Chunga. Despite her defeat, Rumplestiltskin was then moved up to Group Two level for the Debutante Stakes at the Curragh. Fallon settled the filly in fourth before moving her up to challenge in the final quarter of a mile. Rumplestiltskin quickened to settle the race "in a matter of strides" and went clear to win "easily" by two lengths.

A month later she returned to the Curragh for the Moyglare Stud Stakes, Ireland's only Group One race for two-year-old fillies, for which was made favourite at odds of 2/7. She broke slowly and was held up at the back of the field before being brought through by Fallon to lead a furlong out. She did not go clear, however and had to be driven out to win by a neck from Ugo Fire. After the race O'Brien was reported to have explained that the filly tended to pull up when she hit the front and that "she only just does enough." Fallon meanwhile claimed that the filly had been badly hampered and almost brought down in the early stages. The bookmakers were left undecided by her performance, offering odds of between 8/1 and 16/1 for the 1,000 Guineas.

On her final start she was sent to Longchamp for the Prix Marcel Boussac. She was made favourite ahead of Prix du Calvados winner Confidential Lady, and Sirene Doloise, the winner of the Prix d'Aumale. Fallon settled the filly in the early stages but found himself boxed in and unable to find a clear run when he tried to make a challenge in the straight. Rumplestilstkin was switched to the outside and quickened well to take the lead inside the final furlong and record a "narrow but decisive" victory. After the race the bookmakers cut her odds for the Guineas to 3/1. O'Brien praised Fallon for extricating the winner from a difficult position and called Rumplestiltskin "a very special filly".

=== 2006: three-year-old season ===
As a three-year-old, Rumplestiltskin was sent straight for the 1000 Guineas at Newmarket without a prep race, and started 3/1 favourite. This was despite speculation that she would miss the race in favour of the Poule d'Essai des Pouliches. After being hampered at the start she was never able to get into contention and finished seventh of the thirteen runners behind Speciosa. Fallon felt that the filly had been unsuited by the soft ground.

After the race O'Brien revealed that Rumplestiltskin had suffered an injury to "a ligament close to her pelvis" and would be unable to race for several weeks. She never ran again and her retirement was confirmed in October.

== Race record ==
Date	Race	Dist (f)	Course	Class	Prize (£K)	Odds	Runners	Placing	Margin	Time	Jockey	Trainer
14 May 2005	Windscreen Centre Maiden	6	Naas	M	6	4/5	13	1	0.5	1:11.20	Seamie Heffernan	Aidan O'Brien
6 June 2005	Swordlestown Stud Sprint Stakes	6	Naas	Listed	36	8/11	8	1	1.5	1:10.20	Kieren Fallon	Aidan O'Brien
17 June 2005	Albany Stakes	6	York	3	34	5/4	14	3	4.5	1:10.35	Kieren Fallon	Aidan O'Brien
7 August 2005	Debutante Stakes	7	The Curragh	2	57	11/8	7	1	2	1:27.90	Kieren Fallon	Aidan O'Brien
4 September 2005	Moyglare Stud Stakes	7	The Curragh	1	121	2/7	9	1	neck	1:25.80	Kieren Fallon	Aidan O'Brien
2 October 2005	Prix Marcel Boussac	8	Longchamp	1	121	2/1	15	1	1	1:37.30	Kieren Fallon	Aidan O'Brien
7 May 2006	1000 Guineas	8	Newmarket Rowley	1	187	3/1	13	7	11	1:40.53	Kieren Fallon	Aidan O'Brien

== Assessment ==
In the International Classification of European two-year-old for 2005 Rumplestiltskin was assigned a rating of 116, making her officially the best juvenile filly, eight pounds behind the leading colt George Washington.

She was also voted European Champion Two-Year-Old Filly at the Cartier Racing Award

== Stud career ==
Rumplestiltskin's first foal, Why, a filly sired by Galileo won a maiden race at Leopardstown in 2010. Her 2010 foal, a colt named Theatre, also by Galileo, won a Leopardstown maiden by six and a half lengths in June 2012. In 2014 her 2011 filly Tapestry finished 2nd in the Irish Oaks before winning the Yorkshire Oaks. Rumplestiltkin's 2012 foal, John F Kennedy, won two of his three starts in 2014, including the Group Three Juvenile Turf Stakes.

== Pedigree ==
Pedigree of Rumplestiltskin (IRE), bay mare, 2003
Sire Danehill (USA) 1986	Danzig; 1977	Northern Dancer*	Nearctic
Sire Danehill (USA) 1986	Danzig; 1977	Northern Dancer*	Natalma*
Sire Danehill (USA) 1986	Danzig; 1977	Pas de Nom	Admiral's Voyage
Sire Danehill (USA) 1986	Danzig; 1977	Pas de Nom	Petitioner
Sire Danehill (USA) 1986	Rayzana; 1981	His Majesty	Ribot
Sire Danehill (USA) 1986	Rayzana; 1981	His Majesty	Flower Bowl
Sire Danehill (USA) 1986	Rayzana; 1981	Spring Adieu	Buckpasser
Sire Danehill (USA) 1986	Rayzana; 1981	Spring Adieu	Natalma*
Dam Monevassia (USA) 1994	Mr. Prospector; 1970	Raise a Native	Native Dancer
Dam Monevassia (USA) 1994	Mr. Prospector; 1970	Raise a Native	Raise You
Dam Monevassia (USA) 1994	Mr. Prospector; 1970	Gold Digger	Nashua
Dam Monevassia (USA) 1994	Mr. Prospector; 1970	Gold Digger	Sequence
Dam Monevassia (USA) 1994	Miesque; 1984	Nureyev	Northern Dancer*
Dam Monevassia (USA) 1994	Miesque; 1984	Nureyev	Special
Dam Monevassia (USA) 1994	Miesque; 1984	Pasadoble	Prove Out
Dam Monevassia (USA) 1994	Miesque; 1984	Pasadoble	Santa Quilla (Family: 20)

- Runplestiltskin is inbred 3x4 to Northern Dancer. This means that the stallion appears in both the third and fourth generations of her pedigree. Northern Dancer's dam Natalma, also appears separately in the fourth generation of her pedigree as the dam of Spring Adieu.
