= Gay Gallanta =

American-bred Thoroughbred racehorse

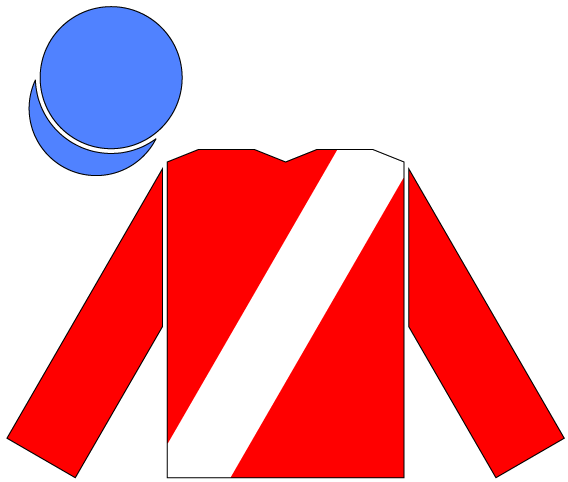
- Racing colours of Cheveley Park Stud
- Sire: Woodman
- Grandsire: Mr. Prospector
- Dam: Gallanta
- Damsire: Nureyev
- Sex: Mare
- Foaled: 27 March 1992
- Country: United States
- Colour: Chestnut
- Breeder: Flaxman Holdings
- Owner: Cheveley Park Stud
- Trainer: Michael Stoute
- Record: 10: 2-2-1
- Earnings: £137,346

Major wins
- Queen Mary Stakes (1994); Cheveley Park Stakes (1994)

Awards
- European Champion Two-Year-Old Filly (1994)
- Last updated on January 12, 2007

Gay Gallanta is an American-bred, British-trained champion Thoroughbred racehorse and successful broodmare. She was awarded the title of European Champion Two-Year-Old Filly at the 1994 Cartier Racing Awards. In her championship season she won two of her five starts; the Group One Cheveley Park Stakes and the Group Three Queen Mary Stakes.

== Background ==
Gay Gallanta is a chestnut mare, bred in Kentucky by Flaxman Holdings Ltd, the American breeding division of the Niarchos family's racing interests. She was sired by Woodman out of the Nureyev mare Gallanta.

Woodman, a son of Mr. Prospector, was a highly successful stallion, siring the winners of more than twenty Group One races including the champions Bosra Sham, Hawk Wing and Hector Protector. Gallanta produced at least twelve winners after a racing career which included a win in the Prix de Cabourg and a second place in the Prix Morny. As daughter of Gay Missile, Gallanta was closely related to the leading American thoroughbreds Summer Squall, A.P. Indy and Lemon Drop Kid.

Gay Gallanta was sent to the Keeneland July sales as yearling where she was bought for $350,000 by the BBA.

She was trained throughout her career by Michael Stoute at Newmarket, Suffolk.

== Racing career ==
=== 1994: two-years-old season ===
Gay Gallanta's debut was not a particularly promising one, as she finished fifth of the ten runners in a maiden race at Sandown Park Racecourse at the end of May. She was nevertheless sent to Royal Ascot for the Queen Mary Stakes, the first Group race of the season for two-year-old fillies. She started as a 16/1 outsider but belied her odds by taking the lead two furlongs and running on well to hold off the strong challenge of Myself to win by a head. The field proved to be a strong one: Myself went on to win the Nell Gwyn Stakes, while the third placed Hoh Magic won the Group One Prix Morny later that season.

Gay Gallanta's next appearance came two months later at York in the Lowther Stakes for which she was made joint-favourite with Harayir, to whom she was set to concede three pounds. She was held up in the early stages by Walter Swinburn before making a challenge in the straight. She could never reach the impressive Harayir however, and was beaten three lengths. Unusually for a leading two-year-old filly, she was then tried against colts, and finished third to Princely Hush in the Mill Reef Stakes at Newbury.

On her final start of the season, Gay Gallanta was sent to Newmarket for the Cheveley Park Stakes, one of the two Group One races for two-year-old fillies in Britain. She was largely ignored in the betting, starting at 14/1 while Harayir was made 9/4 favourite. Ridden by Pat Eddery, Gay Gallanta tracked the leaders before making a strong effort in the last quarter mile. She ran on "gamely" under pressure to take the lead in the closing stages and win by half a length from Tanami, with Harayir third.

Looking back on the two-year-old fillies of 1994, Sue Montgomery, writing in The Independent commented that they "kept beating each other, but there was much to admire about the determination of Gay Gallanta."

=== 1995: three-year-old season ===
Gay Gallanta failed to win in five starts as a three-year-old. She started joint-favourite for the Fred Darling Stakes, a trial race for the 1000 Guineas, but could finish only fifth behind Aqaarid. In the Guineas itself she made little impression when finishing seventh to Harayir.

Another disappointing effort followed in the Coronation Stakes, but she showed a return to something like her best form in the Falmouth Stakes. After looking outpaced at one stage, she "rallied" strongly and just failed to catch Caramba, finishing second by a short head, with Harayir third. She had shown impressive acceleration and, before the result of the photo-finish was announced, most observers were convinced that she had won.

Two weeks later she was dropped down to Listed class for the Oak Tree Stakes but finished seventh of the ten runners behind Brief Glimpse. She was then retired to stud.

== Race record ==
Date	Race	Dist (f)	Course	Class	Prize (£K)	Odds	Runners	Placing	Margin	Time	Jockey	Trainer
30 May 1994	EBF Maiden Fillies' Stakes	5	Sandown	M	3	4/1	11	5	4.75	1:03.64	Walter Swinburn	Michael Stoute
15 June 1994	Queen Mary Stakes	5	Ascot	3	26	16/1	16	1	head	1:01.65	Walter Swinburn	Michael Stoute
18 August 1994	Lowther Stakes	6	York	2	43	2/1	6	2	3	1:11.14	Walter Swinburn	Michael Stoute
17 September 1994	Mill Reef Stakes	6	Newbury	2	31	4/1	9	3	2.25	1:17.23	Pat Eddery	Michael Stoute
27 September 1994	Cheveley Park Stakes	6	Newmarket Rowley	1	76	14/1	10	1	0.5	1:11.08	Pat Eddery	Michael Stoute
21 April 1995	Fred Darling Stakes	7	Newbury	1	22	9/4	8	5	4.5	1:28.37	Walter Swinburn	Michael Stoute
7 May 1995	1000 Guineas	8	Newmarket Rowley	1	110	10/1	14	7	6.25	1:36.72	Walter Swinburn	Michael Stoute
21 June 1995	Coronation Stakes	8	Ascot	1	119	12/1	10	5	11	1:38.58	Walter Swinburn	Michael Stoute
12 July 1995	Falmouth Stakes	8	Newmarket July	2	34	8/1	5	2	short head	1:40.17	Pat Eddery	Michael Stoute
25 July 1995	Oak Tree Stakes	7	Goodwood	Listed	20	3/1	10	7	9.75	1:23.88	Frankie Dettori	Michael Stoute

== Assessment ==
In the 1994 Cartier Racing Awards, Gay Gallanta was named European Champion Two-Year-Old Filly.

She was rated the second best two-year-old filly in Europe by the International Classification for 1994.

== Breeding record ==
Gay Gallanta was retired to her owners' Cheveley Park Stud at Newmarket. She has proved to be a successful broodmare, producing eight winners. Her best foal has been Byron (by Green Desert) who won the Mill Reef Stakes and the Lennox Stakes.

== Pedigree ==
Pedigree of Gay Gallanta (USA), chestnut mare, 1992
Sire Woodman (USA) 1983	Mr. Prospector; 1970	Raise a Native	Native Dancer
Sire Woodman (USA) 1983	Mr. Prospector; 1970	Raise a Native	Raise You
Sire Woodman (USA) 1983	Mr. Prospector; 1970	Gold Digger	Nashua
Sire Woodman (USA) 1983	Mr. Prospector; 1970	Gold Digger	Sequence
Sire Woodman (USA) 1983	Playmate; 1975	Buckpasser	Tom Fool
Sire Woodman (USA) 1983	Playmate; 1975	Buckpasser	Busanda
Sire Woodman (USA) 1983	Playmate; 1975	Intriguing	Swaps
Sire Woodman (USA) 1983	Playmate; 1975	Intriguing	Glamour
Dam Gallanta (USA) 1982	Nureyev; 1977	Northern Dancer	Nearctic
Dam Gallanta (USA) 1982	Nureyev; 1977	Northern Dancer	Natalma
Dam Gallanta (USA) 1982	Nureyev; 1977	Special	Forli
Dam Gallanta (USA) 1982	Nureyev; 1977	Special	Thong
Dam Gallanta (USA) 1982	Gay Missile; 1967	Sir Gaylord	Turn-To
Dam Gallanta (USA) 1982	Gay Missile; 1967	Sir Gaylord	Somethingroyal
Dam Gallanta (USA) 1982	Gay Missile; 1967	Missy Baba	My Babu
Dam Gallanta (USA) 1982	Gay Missile; 1967	Missy Baba	Uvira (Family: 3-l)
