= Pas de Reponse =

American-bred Thoroughbred racehorse

- Sire: Danzig
- Grandsire: Northern Dancer
- Dam: Soundings
- Damsire: Mr. Prospector
- Sex: Mare
- Foaled: 17 April 1994
- Country: United States
- Colour: Bay
- Breeder: Wertheimer et Frère
- Owner: Wertheimer et Frère
- Trainer: Criquette Head
- Record: 13:5-3-1
- Earnings: £205,448

Major wins
- Prix Yacowlef (1996); Prix d'Arenberg (1996); Cheveley Park Stakes (1996); Prix Imprudence (1997); Prix de Meautry (1997)

Awards
- European Champion Two-Yr-Old Filly (1996)

Pas de Reponse (foaled 1994) was an American-bred, French-trained Thoroughbred racehorse and broodmare. In 1996 she won three of her four races including the Cheveley Park Stakes and was named European Champion Two-year-old Filly at the Cartier Racing Awards. In the following year she won the Prix Imprudence and the Prix de Meautry and finished fourth when favourite for the classic 1000 Guineas. After an unsuccessful campaign in 1998 she was retired to stud where she had some success as a broodmare.

== Background ==
Pas de Reponse was a bay mare bred in the United States by her owners Wertheimer et Frère. Her sire Danzig, who ran only three times before his career was ended by injury, was a highly successful stallion who sired the winners of more than fifty Grade I/Group One races. His offspring include the champions Chief's Crown, Dayjur and Lure as well as the important stallion Danehill. Pas de Reponse's mother, Soundings, was a granddaughter of South Ocean, the dam of Storm Bird. At stud, Soundings also produced Green Tune (Poule d'Essai des Poulains, Prix d'Ispahan) and Didyme (Prix Robert Papin). Pas de Reponse was sent into training with Criquette Head at Chantilly in France.

== Racing career ==
=== 1996:two-year-old season ===
Pas de Reponse began her racing career in the Listed Prix Yacowlef over 1200 metres at Deauville Racecourse on 1 August. Ridden by her trainer's brother Freddy Head, she won by a length from Imia. Seventeen days later she was moved up in class for the Group One Prix Morny over the same course and distance. She was the only filly in the field and finished third behind the British-trained Bahamian Bounty and the odds-on favourite Zamindar. In September Pas de Reponse appeared at Evry Racecourse to contest the Prix d'Arenberg over 1100 metres. She started the 1/2 favourite and won by one and a half lengths. On her final appearance of the season, Pas de Reponse was sent to Britain for the Cheveley Park Stakes over six furlongs at Newmarket Racecourse. She was among the leaders from the start and took the lead a furlong from the finish to win by a length from Moonlight Paradise. Following her win, Pas de Reponse was offered at odds of 7/1 for the following year's 1000 Guineas, despite doubts about her ability to stay the one mile distance.

=== 1997:three-year-old season ===
Pas de Reponse began her three-year-old season in the Prix Imprudence over 1400 metres at Maisons-Laffitte on 11 April. Racing over a distance beyond 1200 metres for the first time, she won by two and a half lengths from two opponents. On 4 May, Pas de Reponse returned to Newmarket to contest the 1000 Guineas over the Rowley Mile course and was made the 5/2 favourite against fourteen other fillies. Before the race Criquette Head described Pas de Reponse as being as good as her previous 1000 Guineas winners Ma Biche, Ravinella and Hatoof. In the race, Pas de Reponse fought against Freddy Head's attempts to restrain her and although she emerged as a challenger two furlongs out she made little impression in the closing stages and finished fourth, five lengths behind the winner Sleepytime.

Pas de Reponse reverted to sprinting after her defeat at Newmarket. After a break of almost four months she reappeared in the Group Three Prix de Meautry at Deauville, and started odds on favourite. Ridden for the first time by Olivier Doleuze she had difficulty obtaining a clear run in the final 200 metres but finished strongly to win from Linoise and Hever Golf Rose. In October she moved down to 1000 metres for the Prix de l'Abbaye at Longchamp and started the 9/5 second favourite. Doleuze sent the filly into the lead at half way and but after holding off a challenge from the favourite Royal Applause she was caught in the final strides and beaten half a length by the British-trained outsider Carmine Lake. On her final start of the year she was sent to the United States for the Breeders' Cup Sprint on dirt at Hollywood Park, but made little impression as she finished eleventh of the fourteen runners behind Elmhurst.

=== 1998:four-year-old season ===
Pas de Reponse remained in training as a four-year-old for a sprinting campaign but her record was disappointing. In May at Longchamp she finished second when made odds-on favourite for both the Prix de Saint-Georges and the Prix du Palais-Royal. In the summer she was unplaced in the July Cup and the Prix Maurice de Gheest after which she was retired from racing.

== Assessment and honours ==
At the end of the 1996 season, Pas de Reponse was named European Champion Two-year-old Filly at the Cartier Racing Awards.

== Stud record ==
Pas de Reponse became a broodmare in the United States for the Wertheimer family and had some success. Her progeny included the Listed race winners Sunday Doubt (sired by Sunday Silence) and Saying (by Giant's Causeway).

== Pedigree ==
Pedigree of Pas de Reponse (USA), bay mare, 1994
Sire Danzig (USA) 1977	Northern Dancer (CAN); 1961	Nearctic	Nearco
Sire Danzig (USA) 1977	Northern Dancer (CAN); 1961	Nearctic	Lady Angela
Sire Danzig (USA) 1977	Northern Dancer (CAN); 1961	Natalma (USA)	Native Dancer
Sire Danzig (USA) 1977	Northern Dancer (CAN); 1961	Natalma (USA)	Almahmoud
Sire Danzig (USA) 1977	Pas de Nom (USA); 1968	Admiral's Voyage	Crafty Admiral
Sire Danzig (USA) 1977	Pas de Nom (USA); 1968	Admiral's Voyage	Olympia Lou
Sire Danzig (USA) 1977	Pas de Nom (USA); 1968	Petitioner (GB)	Petition
Sire Danzig (USA) 1977	Pas de Nom (USA); 1968	Petitioner (GB)	Steady Aim
Dam Soundings (USA) 1983	Mr. Prospector (USA); 1970	Raise a Native	Native Dancer
Dam Soundings (USA) 1983	Mr. Prospector (USA); 1970	Raise a Native	Raise You
Dam Soundings (USA) 1983	Mr. Prospector (USA); 1970	Gold Digger	Nashua
Dam Soundings (USA) 1983	Mr. Prospector (USA); 1970	Gold Digger	Sequence
Dam Soundings (USA) 1983	Ocean's Answer (CAN); 1976	Northern Answer	Northern Dancer
Dam Soundings (USA) 1983	Ocean's Answer (CAN); 1976	Northern Answer	Windy Answer
Dam Soundings (USA) 1983	Ocean's Answer (CAN); 1976	South Ocean	New Providence
Dam Soundings (USA) 1983	Ocean's Answer (CAN); 1976	South Ocean	Shining Sun (Family: 4-j)

- Pas de Reponse was inbred 2 x 4 to Northern Dancer, meaning that this stallion appears in both the second and fourth generations of her pedigree.
