= Cartier Racing Award =

Awards in European horse racing

The Cartier Racing Awards are awards in European horse racing, founded in 1991, and sponsored by Cartier. The award winners are decided by points earned in group races (30%) plus the votes cast by British racing journalists (35%) and readers of the Racing Post and The Daily Telegraph newspapers (35%).

Eight horse awards are given out annually plus the Daily Telegraph Award of Merit to the person whom members of the Cartier jury believe has done the most for European racing and/or breeding either over their lifetime or within the previous 12 months.

The highest Cartier award for horses is "Horse of the Year".

The equivalent in Australia is the Australian Thoroughbred racing awards, in Japan the JRA Awards, in Canada the Sovereign Awards, and in the United States the Eclipse Awards.

Horse names are followed by a suffix indicating the country where foaled.

== Horse of the Year ==
- 2026: Ombudsman (IRE)
- 2025: Calandagan (IRE)
- 2024: City of Troy (USA)
- 2023: Ace Impact (IRE)
- 2022: Baaeed (GB)
- 2021: St Mark's Basilica (FR)
- 2020: Ghaiyyath (IRE)
- 2019: Enable (GB)
- 2018: Roaring Lion (USA)
- 2017: Enable (GB)
- 2016: Minding (IRE)
- 2015: Golden Horn (GB)
- 2014: Kingman (GB)
- 2013: Treve (FR)
- 2012: Frankel (GB)
- 2011: Frankel (GB)
- 2010: Goldikova (IRE)
- 2009: Sea the Stars (IRE)
- 2008: Zarkava (FR)
- 2007: Dylan Thomas (IRE)
- 2006: Ouija Board (GB)
- 2005: Hurricane Run (IRE)
- 2004: Ouija Board (GB)
- 2003: Dalakhani (IRE)
- 2002: Rock of Gibraltar (IRE)
- 2001: Fantastic Light (US)
- 2000: Giant's Causeway (US)
- 1999: Daylami (IRE)
- 1998: Dream Well (FR)
- 1997: Peintre Celebre (US)
- 1996: Helissio (FR)
- 1995: Ridgewood Pearl (GB)
- 1994: Barathea (IRE)
- 1993: Lochsong (GB)
- 1992: User Friendly (GB)
- 1991: Arazi (US)

== Top Older Horse ==
- 2026: Ombudsman (IRE)
- 2025: Calandagan (IRE)
- 2024: Charyn (IRE)
- 2023: Mostahdaf (IRE)
- 2022: Baaeed (GB)
- 2021: Palace Pier (GB)
- 2020: Ghaiyyath (IRE)
- 2019: Enable (GB)
- 2018: Enable (GB)
- 2017: Ulysses (IRE)
- 2016: Found (IRE)
- 2015: Solow (GB)
- 2014: Noble Mission (GB)
- 2013: Moonlight Cloud (GB)
- 2012: Frankel (GB)
- 2011: Cirrus des Aigles (FR)
- 2010: Goldikova (IRE)
- 2009: Goldikova (IRE)
- 2008: Duke of Marmalade (IRE)
- 2007: Dylan Thomas (IRE)
- 2006: Ouija Board (GB)
- 2005: Azamour (IRE)
- 2004: Soviet Song (IRE)
- 2003: Falbrav (IRE)
- 2002: Grandera (IRE)
- 2001: Fantastic Light (US)
- 2000: Kalanisi (IRE)
- 1999: Daylami (IRE)
- 1998: Swain (IRE)
- 1997: Pilsudski (IRE)
- 1996: Halling (US)
- 1995: Further Flight (GB)
- 1994: Barathea (IRE)
- 1993: Opera House (GB)
- 1992: Mr Brooks (GB)
- 1991: Terimon (GB)

== Top Stayer ==
- 2026: Scandinavia (USA)
- 2025: Trawlerman (IRE)
- 2024: Kyprios (IRE)
- 2023: Trueshan (FR)
- 2022: Kyprios (IRE)
- 2021: Trueshan (FR)
- 2020: Stradivarius (IRE)
- 2019: Stradivarius (IRE)
- 2018: Stradivarius (IRE)
- 2017: Order of St George (IRE)
- 2016: Order of St George (IRE)
- 2015: Simple Verse (IRE)
- 2014: Leading Light (IRE)
- 2013: Estimate (IRE)
- 2012: Colour Vision (FR)
- 2011: Fame and Glory (IRE)
- 2010: Rite of Passage (GB)
- 2009: Yeats (IRE)
- 2008: Yeats (IRE)
- 2007: Yeats (IRE)
- 2006: Yeats (IRE)
- 2005: Westerner (GB)
- 2004: Westerner (GB)
- 2003: Persian Punch (IRE)
- 2002: Vinnie Roe (IRE)
- 2001: Persian Punch (IRE)
- 2000: Kayf Tara (GB)
- 1999: Kayf Tara (GB)
- 1998: Kayf Tara (GB)
- 1997: Celeric (GB)
- 1996: Nononito (FR)
- 1995: Double Trigger (IRE)
- 1994: Moonax (IRE)
- 1993: Vintage Crop (GB)
- 1992: Drum Taps (US)
- 1991: Turgeon (US)

== Top Sprinter ==
- 2026: Almeraq (GB)
- 2025: Asfoora (AUS)
- 2024: Bradsell (GB)
- 2023: Shaquille (GB)
- 2022: Highfield Princess (FR)
- 2021: Starman (GB)
- 2020: Battaash (IRE)
- 2019: Blue Point (IRE)
- 2018: Mabs Cross (GB)
- 2017: Harry Angel (IRE)
- 2016: Quiet Reflection (GB)
- 2015: Muhaarar (GB)
- 2014: Sole Power (GB)
- 2013: Lethal Force (IRE)
- 2012: Black Caviar (AUS)
- 2011: Dream Ahead (US)
- 2010: Starspangledbanner (AUS)
- 2009: Fleeting Spirit (GB)
- 2008: Marchand d'Or (FR)
- 2007: Red Clubs (IRE)
- 2006: Reverence (GB)
- 2005: Avonbridge (GB)
- 2004: Somnus (GB)
- 2003: Oasis Dream (GB)
- 2002: Continent (GB)
- 2001: Mozart (IRE)
- 2000: Nuclear Debate (US)
- 1999: Stravinsky (US)
- 1998: Tamarisk (GB)
- 1997: Royal Applause (GB)
- 1996: Anabaa (US)
- 1995: Hever Golf Rose (GB)
- 1994: Lochsong (GB)
- 1993: Lochsong (GB)
- 1992: Mr Brooks (GB)
- 1991: Sheikh Albadou (GB)

== Three-Year-Old Colt ==
- 2026: Bow Echo (IRE)
- 2025: Delacroix (IRE)
- 2024: City of Troy (USA)
- 2023: Ace Impact (IRE)
- 2022: Vadeni (FR)
- 2021: St Mark's Basilica (FR)
- 2020: Palace Pier (GB)
- 2019: Too Darn Hot (GB)
- 2018: Roaring Lion (USA)
- 2017: Cracksman (GB)
- 2016: Almanzor (FR)
- 2015: Golden Horn (GB)
- 2014: Kingman (GB)
- 2013: Magician (IRE)
- 2012: Camelot (GB)
- 2011: Frankel (GB)
- 2010: Workforce (GB)
- 2009: Sea the Stars (IRE)
- 2008: New Approach (IRE)
- 2007: Authorized (IRE)
- 2006: George Washington (IRE)
- 2005: Hurricane Run (IRE)
- 2004: Bago (FR)
- 2003: Dalakhani (IRE)
- 2002: Rock of Gibraltar (IRE)
- 2001: Galileo (IRE)
- 2000: Sinndar (IRE)
- 1999: Montjeu (IRE)
- 1998: Dream Well (FR)
- 1997: Peintre Celebre (US)
- 1996: Helissio (FR)
- 1995: Lammtarra (US)
- 1994: King's Theatre (IRE)
- 1993: Commander in Chief (GB)
- 1992: Rodrigo de Triano (US)
- 1991: Suave Dancer (US)

== Three-Year-Old Filly ==
- 2026: Diamond Necklace (IRE)
- 2025: Minnie Hauk
- 2024: Porta Fortuna (IRE)
- 2023: Tahiyra (IRE)
- 2022: Inspiral (GB)
- 2021: Snowfall (JPN)
- 2020: Love (IRE)
- 2019: Star Catcher (GB)
- 2018: Alpha Centauri (IRE)
- 2017: Enable (GB)
- 2016: Minding (IRE)
- 2015: Legatissimo (GB)
- 2014: Taghrooda (GB)
- 2013: Treve (FR)
- 2012: The Fugue (GB)
- 2011: Danedream (GER)
- 2010: Snow Fairy (IRE)
- 2009: Sariska (GB)
- 2008: Zarkava (IRE)
- 2007: Peeping Fawn (US)
- 2006: Mandesha (FR)
- 2005: Divine Proportions (US)
- 2004: Ouija Board (GB)
- 2003: Russian Rhythm (US)
- 2002: Kazzia (GER)
- 2001: Banks Hill (GB)
- 2000: Petrushka (IRE)
- 1999: Ramruma (US)
- 1998: Cape Verdi (IRE)
- 1997: Ryafan (US)
- 1996: Bosra Sham (US)
- 1995: Ridgewood Pearl (GB)
- 1994: Balanchine (US)
- 1993: Intrepidity (GB)
- 1992: User Friendly (GB)
- 1991: Kooyonga (IRE)

== Two-Year-Old Colt ==
- 2026: Darkness Falls (IRE)
- 2025: Gstaad (GB)
- 2024: Shadow of Light
- 2023: City of Troy (USA)
- 2022: Blackbeard (IRE)
- 2021: Native Trail (GB)
- 2020: Van Gogh (USA)
- 2019: Pinatubo (IRE)
- 2018: Too Darn Hot (GB)
- 2017: U S Navy Flag (USA)
- 2016: Churchill (IRE)
- 2015: Air Force Blue (USA)
- 2014: Gleneagles (IRE)
- 2013: Kingston Hill (GB)
- 2012: Dawn Approach (IRE)
- 2011: Dabirsim (FR)
- 2010: Frankel (GB)
- 2009: St Nicholas Abbey (IRE)
- 2008: Mastercraftsman (IRE)
- 2007: New Approach (IRE)
- 2006: Teofilo (IRE)
- 2005: George Washington (IRE)
- 2004: Shamardal (USA)
- 2003: One Cool Cat (USA)
- 2002: Hold That Tiger (US)
- 2001: Johannesburg (US)
- 2000: Tobougg (IRE)
- 1999: Fasliyev (USA)
- 1998: Aljabr (USA)
- 1997: Xaar (GB)
- 1996: Revoque (IRE) & Bahamian Bounty (GB)^{[1]}
- 1995: Alhaarth (IRE)
- 1994: Celtic Swing (GB)
- 1993: First Trump (GB)
- 1992: Zafonic (USA)
- 1991: Arazi (USA)

^{[1]} Revoque was named Champion Two-Year-Old; Bahamian Bounty was named Champion Two-Year-Old Colt.

== Two-Year-Old Filly ==
- 2026: Sun Goddess (IRE)
- 2025: Precise (GB)
- 2024: Lake Victoria (IRE)
- 2023: Opera Singer (USA)
- 2022: Lezoo (GB)
- 2021: Inspiral (GB)
- 2020: Pretty Gorgeous (FR)
- 2019: Quadrilateral (GB)
- 2018: Skitter Scatter (USA)
- 2017: Happily (IRE)
- 2016: Lady Aurelia (USA)
- 2015: Minding (IRE)
- 2014: Tiggy Wiggy (IRE)
- 2013: Chriselliam (IRE)
- 2012: Certify (US)
- 2011: Maybe (IRE)
- 2010: Misty for Me (IRE)
- 2009: Special Duty (GB)
- 2008: Rainbow View (USA)
- 2007: Natagora (FR)
- 2006: Finsceal Beo (IRE)
- 2005: Rumplestiltskin (IRE)
- 2004: Divine Proportions (USA)
- 2003: Attraction (GB)
- 2002: Six Perfections (FR)
- 2001: Queen's Logic (IRE)
- 2000: Superstar Leo (IRE)
- 1999: Torgau (IRE)
- 1998: Bint Allayl (GB)
- 1997: Embassy (GB)
- 1996: Pas de Reponse (USA)
- 1995: Blue Duster (USA)
- 1994: Gay Gallanta (USA)
- 1993: Lemon Souffle (GB)
- 1992: Lyric Fantasy (IRE)
- 1991: Culture Vulture (USA)

== The Daily Telegraph Award of Merit ==
- 2026: Julian Richmond-Watson
- 2025: Brough Scott
- 2024: Jessica Harrington
- 2023: Jeff Smith
- 2022: Kirsten Rausing
- 2021: David Elsworth
- 2020: John Gosden
- 2019: Pat Smullen
- 2018: David Oldrey
- 2017: Michael Stoute
- 2016: Aidan O'Brien
- 2015: Jack Berry
- 2014: Hamdan Al Maktoum
- 2013: Jim Bolger
- 2012: Team Frankel
- 2011: Barry Hills
- 2010: Richard Hannon, Sr.
- 2009: John Oxx
- 2008: Sheikh Mohammed
- 2007: Niarchos family
- 2006: Peter Willett
- 2005: Henry Cecil
- 2004: David & Patricia Thompson
- 2003: Lord Oaksey
- 2002: Prince Khalid Abdullah
- 2001: John Magnier
- 2000: Aga Khan IV
- 1999: Peter Walwyn
- 1998: Head family
- 1997: Peter O'Sullevan
- 1996: Frankie Dettori
- 1995: John Dunlop
- 1994: Marquess of Hartington
- 1993: François Boutin
- 1992: Lester Piggott
- 1991: Henri Chalhoub

== Other awards ==
2002

- Special Award – Tony McCoy

2000

- Millennium Award of Merit – Queen Elizabeth II

== Records ==
Leading horses:

- 5 wins: Frankel, Enable
- 4 wins: Ouija Board, Yeats
- 3 wins: Goldikova, Lochsong, Kayf Tara, Minding, Stradivarius, City of Troy

Leading trainers:

- 38 wins: Aidan O'Brien
- 20 wins: John Gosden
- 15 wins: Saeed bin Suroor
- 10 wins: Henry Cecil
