= Maybe (horse) =

Irish-bred Thoroughbred racehorse

- Racing silks of Michael Tabor
- Sire: Galileo
- Grandsire: Sadler's Wells
- Dam: Sumora
- Damsire: Danehill
- Sex: Mare
- Foaled: 9 February 2009
- Died: 27 January 2026
- Country: Ireland
- Colour: Bay
- Breeder: Epona Bloodstock Ltd
- Owner: Derrick Smith, Mrs John Magnier, Michael Tabor
- Trainer: Aidan O'Brien
- Record: 9: 5-0-1
- Earnings: £284,331

Major wins
- Chesham Stakes (2011); Silver Flash Stakes (2011); Debutante Stakes (2011); Moyglare Stud Stakes (2011)

Awards
- European Champion Two-Year-Old Filly (2011)

Maybe (9 February 2009 – 27 January 2026) was an Irish Thoroughbred racehorse and broodmare. She was undefeated in five races in 2011 including the Group One Moyglare Stud Stakes and was awarded the title of European Champion Two-Year-Old Filly of 2011 at the Cartier Racing Awards. She was the winter favourite for the 2012 1000 Guineas.

== Background ==
Maybe was a bay filly with a white star bred in Ireland by Epona Bloodstock Ltd at the Croome House Stud in County Limerick. She was sired by The Derby winner Galileo out of the Listed race winner Sumora. As a yearling, Maybe was sent to the Deauville Sales where she was bought for €340,000 by the bloodstock agent Dermot "Demi" O'Byrne, acting on behalf of the Coolmore organisation. Like most Coolmore horses she was sent into training with Aidan O'Brien at Ballydoyle. For racing purposes Maybe was registered as being owned by Derrick Smith, Mrs John Magnier and Michael Tabor.

== Racing career ==
=== 2011: two-year-old season ===
Maybe made her racecourse debut in a maiden race at Naas on 11 May 2011. Starting at odds of 8/1 she led from the start and won by four and a half lengths from Princess Sinead. In June, Maybe was sent to England to contest the Chesham Stakes at Royal Ascot in which she was pitted against colts. Ridden by Ryan Moore, she took the lead two furlongs from the finish and recorded an "impressive" two and a quarter length victory over Fort Bastion. In the Group Three Silver Flash Stakes at Leopardstown in July, Maybe started the 2/7 favourite and won by a neck from La Collina. In this race she was ridden by her trainer's son Joseph O'Brien. On 7 August, Maybe was moved up to Group Two class for the Debutante Stakes at The Curragh. Ridden again by Joseph O'Brien, Maybe took the lead two furlongs from the finish and won "comfortably" from Yellow Rosebud and Lightening Pearl. Three weeks later, Maybe returned to the Curragh for the Group One Moyglare Stud Stakes. Starting the 8/13 favourite she took the lead two furlongs out and won from Fire Lily and La Collina. In late September, Maybe's form was boosted when Lightening Pearl won the Group One Cheveley Park Stakes at Newmarket.

In November, Maybe was named European Champion Two-Year-Old Filly at the Cartier Racing Awards.

=== 2012: three-year-old season ===
Maybe made her three-year-old debut in the 1000 Guineas at Newmarket on 6 May for which she was made 13/8 favourite. The start of the race was delayed after the filly Gray Pearl collapsed in the starting stalls. Maybe finished third to her stable companion Homecoming Queen. In The Oaks a month later, Maybe started as 100/30 second favourite, but was again beaten by a stable companion, finishing fifth to Was. The filly was expected to run in the Pretty Polly Stakes on 1 July, but was withdrawn (along with Was) because of the extremely soft ground. Maybe's next appearance was the Falmouth Stakes at Newmarket on 13 July. Racing against older fillies and mares for the first time she finished fifth of the ten runners behind the French-trained four-year-old Giofra. On her only subsequent appearance Maybe finished last of the eight runners in the Matron Stakes at Leopardstown in September.

== Breeding record ==
After the end of her second season Maybe was retired from racing to become a broodmare for the Coolmore Stud. Her second foal Saxon Warrior (by Deep Impact) won the Racing Post Trophy in 2017 and 2000 Guineas in 2018. She died on 27 January 2026 due to a sudden illness.

== Pedigree ==
Pedigree of Maybe (IRE), bay filly, 2009
Sire Galileo (IRE) 1998	Sadler's Wells; 1981	Northern Dancer	Nearctic
Sire Galileo (IRE) 1998	Sadler's Wells; 1981	Northern Dancer	Natalma
Sire Galileo (IRE) 1998	Sadler's Wells; 1981	Fairy Bridge	Bold Reason
Sire Galileo (IRE) 1998	Sadler's Wells; 1981	Fairy Bridge	Special
Sire Galileo (IRE) 1998	Urban Sea; 1989	Miswaki	Mr. Prospector
Sire Galileo (IRE) 1998	Urban Sea; 1989	Miswaki	Hopespringseternal
Sire Galileo (IRE) 1998	Urban Sea; 1989	Allegretta	Lombard
Sire Galileo (IRE) 1998	Urban Sea; 1989	Allegretta	Anatevka
Dam Sumora (IRE) 2002	Danehill; 1986	Danzig	Northern Dancer
Dam Sumora (IRE) 2002	Danehill; 1986	Danzig	Pas de Nom
Dam Sumora (IRE) 2002	Danehill; 1986	Razyana	His Majesty
Dam Sumora (IRE) 2002	Danehill; 1986	Razyana	Spring Adieu
Dam Sumora (IRE) 2002	Rain Flower; 1997	Indian Ridge	Ahonoora
Dam Sumora (IRE) 2002	Rain Flower; 1997	Indian Ridge	Hillbrow
Dam Sumora (IRE) 2002	Rain Flower; 1997	Rose of Jericho	Alleged
Dam Sumora (IRE) 2002	Rain Flower; 1997	Rose of Jericho	Rose Red (Family: 1-t)

- Maybe is inbred 3 × 4 to the stallion Northern Dancer, meaning that Northern Dancer appears once in the third generation and once in the fourth generation of his pedigree.
