= Silver Flash Stakes =

Flat horse race in Ireland

- Class: Group 3
- Location: Leopardstown; County Dublin, Ireland
- Race type: Flat / Thoroughbred
- Sponsor: Saudi Cup
- Website: Leopardstown

Race information
- Distance: 7f (1,408 metres)
- Surface: Turf
- Track: Left-handed
- Qualification: Two-year-old fillies
- Weight: 9 st 2 lb Penalties; 5 lb for Group 2 winners 3 lb for Group 3 winners
- Purse: €60,000 (2025); 1st: €34,400

Silver Flash Stakes
2026
Alpha	Dancing Destiny	Nevermindtherain

Previous years
2025
Composing	Skydance	Smexy
2024
Bedtime Story	Exactly	Barnavara
2023
Ylang Ylang	Vespertilio	Mysteries
2022
Never Ending Story	Zoinnocent	La Dolce Vita
2021
Agartha	Juncture	Seisai

2020-2011
2020
Shale	Pretty Gorgeous	A Ma Chere
2019
Love	Unforgetable	So Wonderful
2018
Skitter Scatter	Moravia	Secret Thoughts
2017
Happily	Shalailah	Dawn Delivers
2016
Promise To Be True	Take A Deep Breath	Intricately
2015
Tanaza	Alice Springs	Turret Rocks
2014
Jack Naylor	Agnes Stewart	Qualify
2013
Wonderfully	Perhaps	Avenue Gabriel
2012
Harasiya	My Special J's	Roseraie
2011
Maybe	La Collina	Gooseberry Fool

2010-2001
2010
Together	Laughing Lashes	Kissable
2009
Cabaret	Alshahbaa	Kitty Kiernan
2008
Luminous Eyes	Chintz	Mark Of An Angel
2007
Triskel	Mad About You	Saoirse Abu
2006
Chanting	Miss Beatrix	Gee Kel
2005
Abigail Pett	Romantic Notion	Beauty Bright
2004
Silk And Scarlet	Alexander Icequeen	La Maitresse
2003
Maroochydore	Acciacatura	Summer Sunset
2002
Luminata	Daganya	New Design
2001
Agnetha	Sophisticat	Colourfast

2000-1991
2000
Freshwater Pearl	La Vida Loca	Marseille Express
1999
Desert Sky	Buffalo Berry	Misty Peak
1998
April Starlight	Camargo	Show Me The Money
1997
Heeremandi	Festival Song	Attractive Crown
1996
Azra	Classic Park	Scottish Mist
1995
Panga	Orange Walk	Tossup
1994
Eva Luna	Sharp Point	Petite Fantasy
1993
Las Meninas	Danish	Common Rumpus
1992
On The Catwalk	Pernilla	Reliable
1991
Fawaayid	Miznah	Ridiya

1990-1988
1990
Kooyonga	African Dance	Beloved Visitor
1989
The Caretaker	Missing You	Endless Joy
1988
Dash Of Red	Alpine Spring	Command Performer

The Silver Flash Stakes is a Group 3 flat horse race in Ireland open to two-year-old thoroughbred fillies. It is run at Leopardstown over a distance of 7 furlongs (1,408 metres), and it is scheduled to take place each year in July.

== History ==
The event was formerly held at Phoenix Park in early September. For a period it was run over 7 furlongs and classed at Listed level.

The race was transferred to Leopardstown and switched to late October in 1991. It was cut to 6 furlongs in 1993, and from this point it took place in early June. It was moved to July in 1999.

The Silver Flash Stakes reverted to 7 furlongs in 2007. It was promoted to Group 3 status in 2008.

== Records ==
Leading jockey since 1986 (7 wins):

- Ryan Moore - Promise To Be True (2016), Happily (2017), Never Ending Story (2022), Ylang Ylang (2023), Bedtime Story (2024), Composing (2025), Alpha (2026)

Leading trainer since 1986 (16 wins):

- Aidan O'Brien – Heeremandi (1997), April Starlight (1998), Freshwater Pearl (2000), Silk and Scarlet (2004), Cabaret (2009), Together (2010), Maybe (2011), Wonderfully (2013), Promise To Be True (2016), Happily (2017), Love (2019), Never Ending Story (2022), Ylang Ylang (2023), Bedtime Story (2024), Composing (2025), Alpha (2026)

== Winners since 1986 ==
Year	Winner	Jockey	Trainer	Time
1986	Simple Taste	Paul Cook	Ian Balding
1987	Tribal Rite	Pat Shanahan	Michael Kauntze
1988	Dash of Red	Declan Gillespie	James Murphy	1:23.90
1989	The Caretaker	Michael Kinane	Dermot Weld	1:20.00
1990	Kooyonga	Warren O'Connor	Michael Kauntze	1:20.40
1991	Fawaayid	Willie Supple	Jim Bolger	1:32.90
1992	On the Catwalk	Richard Hughes	Edward O'Grady	1:31.30
1993	Las Meninas	Stephen Craine	Tommy Stack	1:13.50
1994	Eva Luna (IRE)	Kevin Manning	Jim Bolger	1:15.70
1995	Panga	Michael Kinane	Dermot Weld	1:14.60
1996	Azra	Ted Durcan	Jim Bolger	1:14.60
1997	Heeremandi	Christy Roche	Aidan O'Brien	1:15.40
1998	April Starlight	Christy Roche	Aidan O'Brien	1:12.80
1999	Desert Sky	Kevin Manning	Jim Bolger	1:12.50
2000	Freshwater Pearl	Michael Kinane	Aidan O'Brien	1:13.40
2001	Agnetha	Pat Smullen	Dermot Weld	1:14.60
2002	Luminata	Kevin Manning	Jim Bolger	1:15.20
2003	Maroochydore	Michael Kinane	David Wachman	1:13.70
2004	Silk and Scarlet	Jamie Spencer	Aidan O'Brien	1:15.70
2005	Abigail Pett	Kevin Manning	Jim Bolger	1:13.30
2006	Chanting	Kieren Fallon	David Wachman	1:14.60
2007	Triskel	Wayne Lordan	Tommy Stack	1:36.80
2008	Luminous Eyes	Pat Smullen	Dermot Weld	1:29.65
2009	Cabaret	Johnny Murtagh	Aidan O'Brien	1:28.32
2010	Together	Johnny Murtagh	Aidan O'Brien	1:28.65
2011	Maybe	Joseph O'Brien	Aidan O'Brien	1:31.47
2012	Harasiya	Johnny Murtagh	John Oxx	1:31.31
2013	Wonderfully	Joseph O'Brien	Aidan O'Brien	1:26.65
2014	Jack Naylor	Fran Berry	Jessica Harrington	1:28.48
2015	Tanaza	Pat Smullen	Dermot Weld	1:29.57
2016	Promise To Be True	Ryan Moore	Aidan O'Brien	1:28.83
2017	Happily	Ryan Moore	Aidan O'Brien	1:28.99
2018	Skitter Scatter	Ronan Whelan	Patrick Prendergast	1:31.24
2019	Love	Seamie Heffernan	Aidan O'Brien	1:30.84
2020	Shale (Note: The 2020 race was run in August due to the COVID-19 pandemic in the Republic of Ireland)	Gavin Ryan	Donnacha O'Brien	1:27.69
2021	Agartha	Declan McDonogh	Joseph O'Brien	1:29.55
2022	Never Ending Story	Ryan Moore	Aidan O'Brien	1:30.75
2023	Ylang Ylang	Ryan Moore	Aidan O'Brien	1:31.92
2024	Bedtime Story	Ryan Moore	Aidan O'Brien	1:32.00
2025	Composing	Ryan Moore	Aidan O'Brien	1:33.42
2026	Alpha	Ryan Moore	Aidan O'Brien	1:26.48

== See also ==
- Horse racing in Ireland
- List of Irish flat horse races
