= Again (horse) =

Irish-bred Thoroughbred racehorse

- Racing colours of Michael Tabor
- Sire: Danehill Dancer
- Grandsire: Danehill
- Dam: Cumbres
- Damsire: Kahyasi
- Sex: Mare
- Foaled: 22 May 2006
- Country: Ireland
- Colour: Bay
- Breeder: Southern Bloodstock
- Owner: Michael Tabor & Susan Magnier
- Trainer: David Wachman
- Record: 9:4-0-1
- Earnings: £429,098

Major wins
- Debutante Stakes (2008); Moyglare Stud Stakes (2008); Irish 1,000 Guineas (2009)

Again (foaled 22 May 2006) was an Irish Thoroughbred racehorse and broodmare. She was one of the leading Irish two-year-old fillies of 2008, when she won three of her five races including the Debutante Stakes and the Moyglare Stud Stakes. She recorded her most important win when taking the Irish 1,000 Guineas on her three-year-old debut, but was beaten in her three subsequent races.

== Background ==
Again is a bay mare with a white blaze bred in Ireland by Southern Bloodstock, a breeding operation associated with the Coolmore Stud. She was sired by Danehill Dancer, the Leading sire in Great Britain & Ireland in 2009, whose other progeny have included Mastercraftsman and Choisir. Again's dam Cumbres, was an unraced half-sister of the multiple Group One winner Montjeu. During her racing career, the detail of Again's ownership changed from race to race: she was alternately described as being owned by Michael Tabor and by a partnership of Tabor and Susan Magnier. She was trained by David Wachman, the son-in-law of Coolmore's head John Magnier, at Goolds Cross in County Tipperary.

== Racing career ==
=== 2008: two-year-old season ===
Again made her racecourse debut at Roscommon Racecourse on 7 July 2008, when she finished unplaced in a seven furlong maiden race. Three weeks later she started 5/2 favourite for a similar event over one mile at the Curragh and took the lead in the closing stages to win by half a length from Tingling. Again was moved up sharply in class when she contested the Group Two Debutante Stakes over seven furlongs on heavy ground at the Curragh. Starting at odds of 9/2 and ridden by Johnny Murtagh she took the lead a furlong from the finish and won by three lengths from Oui Say Oui. Two weeks later, Again was made the 6/4 favourite for the Group One Moyglare Stud Stakes over the same course and distance. Ridden by Seamie Heffernan, she moved up to dispute the lead in the final quarter mile and held on to win by half a length from Shimah. On her final appearance of the year, the filly was sent to France to contest the Group One Prix Marcel Boussac at Longchamp Racecourse. She started second favourite but was never in contention and finished fourteenth of the sixteen runners behind Proportional.

=== 2009: three-year-old season ===
Again made her three-year-old debut in the Irish 1,000 Guineas at the Curragh on 22 May, in which she was ridden by Murtagh and started 5/2 favourite against fifteen opponents. She was towards the rear of the field in the early stages before moving up into third place in the final quarter mile. In the final furlong she produced a strong late run along the rail to take the lead in the final strides and won by half a length from the British-trained Lahaleeb. Her win gave Wachman his first success in a Classic race, after the race he said that Again had "always been a nice horse, and I'm lucky to have her". At Royal Ascot in June, Again was matched against the English 1000 Guineas winner Ghanaati in the Group One Coronation Stakes. Ridden by Ryan Moore, she started slowly and lost any chance when hampered in the straight, finishing seventh behind Ghanaati.

In September, Again raced against older fillies and mares in the Matron Stakes and finished third behind Rainbow View and Heaven Sent. On her final appearance, Again started a 20/1 outsider for the Group One Prix de l'Opéra at Longchamps and finished seventh of the nine runners behind Shalanaya.

== Pedigree ==
Pedigree of Again (IRE), bay filly, 2006
Sire Danehill Dancer (IRE) 1993	Danehill; 1986	Danzig	Northern Dancer
Sire Danehill Dancer (IRE) 1993	Danehill; 1986	Danzig	Pas de Nom
Sire Danehill Dancer (IRE) 1993	Danehill; 1986	Razyana	His Majesty
Sire Danehill Dancer (IRE) 1993	Danehill; 1986	Razyana	Spring Adieu
Sire Danehill Dancer (IRE) 1993	Mira Adonde; 1986	Sharpen Up	Atan
Sire Danehill Dancer (IRE) 1993	Mira Adonde; 1986	Sharpen Up	Rocchetta
Sire Danehill Dancer (IRE) 1993	Mira Adonde; 1986	Lettre D'Amour	Caro
Sire Danehill Dancer (IRE) 1993	Mira Adonde; 1986	Lettre D'Amour	Lianga
Dam Cumbres (FR) 1993	Kahyasi; 1985	Ile de Bourbon	Nijinsky
Dam Cumbres (FR) 1993	Kahyasi; 1985	Ile de Bourbon	Roseliere
Dam Cumbres (FR) 1993	Kahyasi; 1985	Kadissya	Blushing Groom
Dam Cumbres (FR) 1993	Kahyasi; 1985	Kadissya	Kalkeen
Dam Cumbres (FR) 1993	Floripedes; 1985	Top Ville	High Top
Dam Cumbres (FR) 1993	Floripedes; 1985	Top Ville	Sega Ville
Dam Cumbres (FR) 1993	Floripedes; 1985	Toute Cy	Tennyson
Dam Cumbres (FR) 1993	Floripedes; 1985	Toute Cy	Adele Toumignon (Family 1-u)
