= Steve Drowne =

Jockey

Steve Drowne (born 10 December 1971) is a former professional flat racing jockey. Growing up, he attended Newmarket Racing School. His father was a Devon farmer.

Drowne is one of racing's most respected senior riders. He had a long association with trainer Roger Charlton. Steve retired at the end of 2017 and became a stipendiary steward.

== Major wins ==
(United Kingdom) Great Britain

- Cheveley Park Stakes - (1) - Queens Logic (2001)
- July Cup – (1) – Sakhee's Secret (2007)
- Nunthorpe Stakes – (1) – Jwala (2013)

(Republic of Ireland) Ireland

- Moyglare Stud Stakes – (1) – Mail The Desert (2002)

France

- Prix de l'Abbaye de Longchamp - (2) - Patavellian (2003), Avonbridge (2005)
