= Debutante Stakes (Ireland) =

Flat horse race in Ireland

- Class: Group 2
- Location: Curragh Racecourse; County Kildare, Ireland
- Inaugurated: A. R. M. Holding
- Race type: Flat / Thoroughbred
- Website: Curragh

Race information
- Distance: 7f (1,408 metres)
- Surface: Turf
- Track: Right-hand elbow
- Qualification: Two-year-old fillies
- Weight: 9 st 0 lb Penalties; 5 lb for Group 1 winners 3 lb for Group 2 winners
- Purse: € 94,000 (2021); 1st: €59,000

Debutante Stakes
2026
Green Empress	Dancing Destiny	Alpha

Previous years
2025
Composing	Suzie Songs	Evolutionist
2024
Bedtime Story	Exactly	Barnavara
2023
Vespertilio	Sakti	Kalispera
2022
Meditate	Olivia Maralda	Thornbrook
2021
Agartha	Sunset Shiraz	Discoveries

2020-2011
2020
Pretty Gorgeous	Shale	Mother Earth
2019
Alpine Star	Petite Mustique	Soul Search
2018
Skitter Scatter	Bandiuc Eile	Zagitova
2017
Magical	Happily	Mary Tudor
2016
Rhododendron	Hydrangea	Intricately
2015
Ballydoyle	Minding	Most Beautiful
2014
Raydara	Lucida	Toogoodtobetrue
2013
Tapestry	Perhaps	Avenue Gabriel
2012
My Special J's	Harasiya	Diamond Sky
2011
Maybe	Yellow Rosebud	Lightening Pearl

2010-2001
2010
Laughing Lashes	Misty For Me	Together
2009
Lillie Langtry	Devoted To You	Elusive Galaxy
2008
Again	Oui Say Oui	Rare Ransom
2007
Campfire Glow	Listen	Tuscan Evening
2006
Gaudeamus	Dimenticata	Alexander Tango
2005
Rumplestiltskin	Modeeroch	Sahara Princess
2004
Silk And Scarlet	Luas Line	Chelsea Rose
2003
Necklace	Caldy Dancer	Red Feather
2002
Rainbows For All	Yesterday	Rapid Ransom
2001
Saranac Lake	Quarter Moon	Sweet Deimos

2000-1991
2000
Affianced	Sequoyah	Imagine
1999
Preseli	Amethyst	Dance Of Love
1998
Edabiya	Sunspangled	Pink Coral
1997
Photogenic	Viola Royale	Tittle Tattle
1996
Family Tradition	Sadlers Home	Strawberry Roan
1995
Dance Design	Priory Belle	Dathuil
1994
Glounthaune Garden	Distant Lover	Tea Service
1993
Low Key Affair	Anna Ralph	Jedwa
1992
Alalja	Dawnsio	Cookawara
1991
Miznah	Cu Na Mara	Market Booster

1990-1988
1990
Capricciosa	Inishdalla	Title Roll
1989
Polar Bird	Remthat Naser	Wedding Bouquet
1988
Pass The Peace	Blasted Heath	Miss Secreto

The Debutante Stakes is a Group 2 flat horse race in Ireland open to two-year-old thoroughbred fillies. It is run at the Curragh over a distance of 7 furlongs (1,408 metres), and it is scheduled to take place each year in August.

== History ==
The event was formerly held at Phoenix Park, and it used to be contested over 6 furlongs. For a period it was classed at Group 3 level. It was transferred to the Curragh and relegated to Listed status in 1991. It was moved to Leopardstown and extended to 7 furlongs in 1994.

The Debutante Stakes returned to the Curragh in 2000, and it regained Group 3 status in 2001. It was promoted to Group 2 level in 2004, and it continued at the Curragh until 2005.

In recent years, the venue of the race has switched between Leopardstown (2006, 2008–09) and the Curragh (2007, 2010–19).

== Records ==
Leading jockey since 1986 (4 wins):

- Michael Kinane – Polar Bird (1989), Low Key Affair (1993), Dance Design (1995), Necklace (2003)

Leading trainer since 1986 (14 wins):

- Aidan O'Brien – Glounthaune Garden (1994), Family Tradition (1996), Photogenic (1997), Necklace (2003), Silk and Scarlet (2004), Rumplestiltskin (2005), Lillie Langtry (2009), Maybe (2011), Tapestry (2013), Ballydoyle (2015), Rhododendron (2016), Magical (2017), Mediatate (2022), Bedtime Story (2024), Composing (2025)

== Winners since 1986 ==
Year	Winner	Jockey	Trainer	Time
1986	Down Again	Pat Eddery	John Oxx
1987	Fairy Gold	Cash Asmussen	Vincent O'Brien	1:14.40
1988	Pass the Peace	Richard Quinn	Paul Cole	1:11.50
1989	Polar Bird	Michael Kinane	Barry Hills	1:10.80
1990	Capricciosa	John Reid	Vincent O'Brien	1:09.30
1991	Miznah	Christy Roche	Jim Bolger	1:12.60
1992	Alalja	John Egan	Pat Flynn	1:15.80
1993	Low Key Affair	Michael Kinane	Dermot Weld	1:16.50
1994	Glounthaune Garden	Christy Roche	Aidan O'Brien	1:30.20
1995	Dance Design	Michael Kinane	Dermot Weld	1:31.90
1996	Family Tradition	Christy Roche	Aidan O'Brien	1:34.70
1997	Photogenic	Seamie Heffernan	Aidan O'Brien	1:34.30
1998	Edabiya	Johnny Murtagh	John Oxx	1:33.70
1999	Preseli	Eddie Ahern	Michael Grassick	1:31.40
2000	Affianced	Kevin Manning	Jim Bolger	1:28.50
2001	Saranac Lake	Pat Smullen	Dermot Weld	1:27.50
2002	Rainbows for All	Wayne Smith	Kevin Prendergast	1:28.70
2003	Necklace	Michael Kinane	Aidan O'Brien	1:25.00
2004	Silk and Scarlet	Jamie Spencer	Aidan O'Brien	1:25.40
2005	Rumplestiltskin	Kieren Fallon	Aidan O'Brien	1:27.90
2006	Gaudeamus	Kevin Manning	Jim Bolger	1:31.90
2007	Campfire Glow	Pat Smullen	Dermot Weld	1:33.18
2008	Again	Johnny Murtagh	David Wachman	1:33.15
2009	Lillie Langtry	Johnny Murtagh	Aidan O'Brien	1:29.63
2010	Laughing Lashes	Fran Berry	Jessica Harrington	1:24.49
2011	Maybe	Joseph O'Brien	Aidan O'Brien	1:27.43
2012	My Special J's	Colm O'Donoghue	John Patrick Shanahan	1:34.61
2013	Tapestry	Joseph O'Brien	Aidan O'Brien	1:22.89
2014	Raydara	Shane Foley	Michael Halford	1:25.68
2015	Ballydoyle	Joseph O'Brien	Aidan O'Brien	1:24.71
2016	Rhododendron	Seamie Heffernan	Aidan O'Brien	1:27.06
2017	Magical	Donnacha O'Brien	Aidan O'Brien	1:29.64
2018	Skitter Scatter	Ronan Whelan	Patrick Prendergast	1:24.83
2019	Alpine Star	Shane Foley	Jessica Harrington	1:27.08
2020	Pretty Gorgeous	Shane Crosse	Joseph O'Brien	1:28.53
2021	Agartha	Declan McDonogh	Joseph O'Brien	1:27.49
2022	Meditate	Ryan Moore	Aidan O'Brien	1:23.43
2023	Vespertilio	Billy Lee	Willie McCreery	1:26.60
2024	Bedtime Story	Ryan Moore	Aidan O'Brien	1:23.82
2025	Composing	Wayne Lordan	Aidan O'Brien	1:24.70
2026	Green Empress	Dylan Browne McMonagle	Joseph Patrick O'Brien	1:25.28

== See also ==
- Horse racing in Ireland
- List of Irish flat horse races
