= David Loder =

British horse trainer

David Loder (born in Stow-on-the-Wold, Gloucestershire, England) is a trainer of Thoroughbred racehorses.

He began his professional career in Newmarket in 1992 and trained for thirteen years including for Godolphin Racing, where he trained Dubai Millennium before retiring in 2005.

Loder retired after suffering from a virus that prevented him from training as well as he had previously.
