= Twafeaj =

American-bred Thoroughbred racehorse

- Sire: Topsider
- Grandsire: Northern Dancer
- Dam: Billy Sue's Rib
- Damsire: Al Hattab
- Sex: Mare
- Foaled: 22 February 1989
- Country: United States
- Colour: Bay
- Breeder: Bill H Melton
- Owner: Abdulla Buhaleeba
- Trainer: Ben Hanbury
- Record: 14: 3-4-1
- Earnings: £164,143

Major wins
- Moyglare Stud Stakes (1991); Prix de Meautry (1992)

Twafeaj (22 February 1989 – after 2007) was an American-bred, British-trained Thoroughbred racehorse and broodmare. In a racing career which lasted from May 1991 until October 1992 she ran fourteen times in four different countries and won three races. As a juvenile in 1991 she finished second in the Princess Margaret Stakes before recording her biggest win in the Group 1 Moyglare Stud Stakes. As a three-year-old she struggled for form early in the year but did much better when switched to sprint races, winning the Prix de Meautry as well as being placed in the Prix Maurice de Gheest and the Goldene Peitsche. She had little success as a broodmare, producing only two minor winners.

== Background ==
Twafeaj was a bay mare bred in Kentucky by Bill H Melton. In July 1990, the filly was consigned to the Keeneland Summer Select Yearling Sale at Lexington, Kentucky and was bought for $120,000 by representatives of Maktoum bin Rashid Al Maktoum's Gainsborough Stud. She was sent to Europe where she raced in the colours of the businessman Abdulla Buhaleeba and was trained by Ben Hanbury at the Diomed Stables at Newmarket, Suffolk.

Her sire Topsider was just below top class as a racehorse, recording his biggest win in the Grade III Sport Page Handicap in 1978. As a breeding stallion the best of his other progeny included North Sider, Assatis (Gran Premio del Jockey Club) and Salse (Prix de la Forêt). Twafeaj's dam Billy Sue's Rib was a successful racemare in North America, winning thirteen of her twenty-two races and earning $289,635 in prize money. As a granddaughter of the American broodmare Princess Revoked (foaled 1959) she was closely related to My Juliet, Snaafi Dancer, Winona and Lyphard's Special and was a female-line descendant of Ivabel, a half-sister to the Kentucky Derby winner Old Rosebud.

== Racing career ==
=== 1991: two-year-old season ===
Twafeaj made her debut in a maiden race over five furlongs at Newmarket Racecourse on 3 May and finished second, beaten one and a half lengths by Marling after going to the front a furlong out but being overtaken in the closing stages. Eleven days later she started 1/2 favourite for a maiden over the same distance at York Racecourse but was beaten a head by the Mick Easterby-trained Poolesta. At the same track on 14 June the filly started favourite for a minor event over six furlongs, and recorded her first success, taking the lead inside the last quarter mile and coming home three lengths clear of her rivals despite being eased down by her jockey, Pat Eddery, in the final strides.

In July was stepped up in class to contest the Group 3 Cherry Hinton Stakes at Newmarket but finished a well-beaten fourth behind Musicale, Coffee Ice and Miss Bluebird. Later that month she produced a better effort at Ascot Racecourse, finishing strongly to take second place behind the Irish-trained filly Bezelle in the Princess Margaret Stakes. On 8 September the filly was sent to Ireland to contest the Group 1 Moyglare Stud Stakes at the Curragh and started the 7/2 second favourite behind her old rival Poolesta. The best of the other six runners appeared to be Tarwiya (winner of the Listed Rochestown Stakes) but with no previous Group winners in the field the race was weakly-contested by Group 1 standards. Ridden by Bruce Raymond, Twafeaj was among the leaders from the start, went to the front approaching the final furlong and won by half a length from Tarwiya, with Poolesta a length away in third.

On her final start of the year, Twafeaj contested the Group 1 Cheveley Park Stakes at Newmarket on 2 October and came home fourth of the nine runners behind Marling, beaten just over three lengths by the winner.

=== 1992: three-year-old season ===
Twafeaj began her second campaign in Germany when she finished unplaced in the Arag Preis over 1600 metres at Düsseldorf on 10 May. Her first race that year in England came two months later when she finished fourth of the seven runners behind Gusy Marlowe in the Falmouth Stakes over one mile at Newmarket. After this race she was dropped back in distance to compete in sprint races starting with the Prix Maurice de Gheest over 1300 metres at Deauville Racecourse on 2 August. Ridden by Walter Swinburn she started a 29/1 outsider but belied her starting price as she kept on well in the closing stages to take third place behind the colts Pursuit of Love and Cardoun. Seventeen days later, with Swinburn again in the saddle, the filly returned to Deauville and started the 2.2/1 favourite for the Group 3 Prix de Meautry over 1200 metres on soft ground. Her ten opponents on this occasion included Showbrook (Mill Reef Stakes), Ganges (Critérium de Maisons-Laffitte, third in the 2000 Guineas), Ski Chief (Prix du Petit Couvert), Notley (Stewards' Cup) and Crack Regiment (Prix Eclipse). After racing in mid-division, Twafeaj overtook the front-running Thourios inside the last 200 metres and held off a renewed challenge from the Guy Harwood-trained colt to win by a short head. The outsider Amigo Menor came home next to complete a 1-2-3 for British-trained runners.

On 2 September Twafeaj was back in Germany for the Goldene Peitsche over 1200 metres at Baden-Baden and ran much better than she had done in her previous visit to that country. Ridden by Raymond she took the lead 400 metres out and finished a length second to the five-year-old Elbio, having been overtaken in the closing stages. Later that month she started at odds of 6/1 for a strongly-contested edition of the Diadem Stakes at Ascot and finished fourth behind Wolfhound, Lochsong and Montendre. On her final start, Twafeaj was dropped back to 1000 metres for the Prix de l'Abbaye at Longchamp Racecourse on 4 October and came home seventh of the nine runners behind Mr Brooks.

== Breeding record ==
At the end of her racing career, Twafeaj was retired to become a broodmare for the Gainsborough Stud. As a ten-year-old in December 1999 she was put up for auction at Tattersalls and bought for 34,000 guineas by the Barronstown Stud. She was later moved to the Pencarrow Stud in New Zealand. She produced at least nine foals and two minor winners between 1995 and 2007:

- Mr Hamad, a bay colt, foaled in 1995, sired by Rainbow Quest. Failed to win in two races.
- Inthaar, bay colt (later gelded), 1997, by Nashwan. Won one race.
- Lulu Island, brown filly, 1998, by Zafonic. Unraced.
- Shanook, chestnut colt (gelded), 1999, by Rainbow Quest. Won two races.
- bay colt, 2000, by Zafonic. Unraced.
- Top Line Dancer, bay colt, 2001, by Fasliyev. Failed to win in eight races.
- bay colt, 2002, by Danehill. Unraced.
- filly, 2006, by No Excuse Needed. Bred in New Zealand
- Tinkermia, filly, 2007, by Johar. Bred in New Zealand

== Pedigree ==
Pedigree of Twafeaj, bay mare, 1989
Sire Topsider (USA) 1974	Northern Dancer (CAN); 1961	Nearctic	Nearco
Sire Topsider (USA) 1974	Northern Dancer (CAN); 1961	Nearctic	Lady Angela
Sire Topsider (USA) 1974	Northern Dancer (CAN); 1961	Natalma	Native Dancer
Sire Topsider (USA) 1974	Northern Dancer (CAN); 1961	Natalma	Almahmoud
Sire Topsider (USA) 1974	Drumtop (USA); 1966	Round Table	Princequillo
Sire Topsider (USA) 1974	Drumtop (USA); 1966	Round Table	Knight's Daughter
Sire Topsider (USA) 1974	Drumtop (USA); 1966	Zonah	Nasrullah
Sire Topsider (USA) 1974	Drumtop (USA); 1966	Zonah	Gambetta
Dam Billy Sue's Rib (USA) 1980	Al Hattab (USA); 1966	The Axe	Mahmoud
Dam Billy Sue's Rib (USA) 1980	Al Hattab (USA); 1966	The Axe	Blackball
Dam Billy Sue's Rib (USA) 1980	Al Hattab (USA); 1966	Abyssinia	Abernant
Dam Billy Sue's Rib (USA) 1980	Al Hattab (USA); 1966	Abyssinia	Serengeti
Dam Billy Sue's Rib (USA) 1980	Romeo's Coquette (USA); 1973	Gallant Romeo	Gallant Man
Dam Billy Sue's Rib (USA) 1980	Romeo's Coquette (USA); 1973	Gallant Romeo	Juliet's Nurse
Dam Billy Sue's Rib (USA) 1980	Romeo's Coquette (USA); 1973	Princess Revoked	Revoked
Dam Billy Sue's Rib (USA) 1980	Romeo's Coquette (USA); 1973	Princess Revoked	Miss Muffet (Family: 6-a)
