= Air Express =

Irish-bred Thoroughbred racehorse

- Sire: Salse
- Grandsire: Topsider
- Dam: Ibtisamm
- Damsire: Caucasus
- Sex: Stallion
- Foaled: 26 April 1994
- Country: Ireland
- Colour: Bay
- Breeder: Gainsborough Stud
- Owner: Mohamed Obaida
- Trainer: Clive Brittain
- Record: 15: 4-2-3
- Earnings: £405,609

Major wins
- Premio Parioli (1997); Mehl-Mülhens-Rennen (1997); Queen Elizabeth II Stakes (1997)

Air Express (26 April 1994 – 2000) was an Irish-bred, British-trained Thoroughbred racehorse. He was highly tried as a juvenile in 1996, winning one minor race and being placed in the July Stakes, Solario Stakes and Dewhurst Stakes. In the spring of 1997, he embarked on a successful international campaign winning the Premio Parioli in Italy and the Mehl-Mülhens-Rennen in Germany. On his return to England, he ran second in the St James's Palace Stakes and recorded his biggest victory when taking the Queen Elizabeth II Stakes. He failed to win in two starts as a four-year-old and was retired to stud. He made a promising start to his career as a breeding stallion but died in 2000 at the age of six.

== Background ==
Air Express was a bay horse bred in Ireland by Maktoum Al Maktoum's Gainsborough Stud. During his racing career he was owned by Mohamed Obaida, a Dubai-based property developer and trained by Clive Brittain Carlburg Stables in Newmarket, Suffolk. He was ridden in all but his last three races by Brett Doyle.

He was sired by Salse who won the Prix de la Forêt in 1988, before becoming a successful breeding stallion. Although he showed his best form over seven furlongs, Salse was capable of producing horses who stayed much further, including Classic Cliche, Luso (Hong Kong Vase) and Timboroa (Turf Classic) as well as faster horses like Bianca Nera and Lemon Souffle. Air Express's dam Ibtisamm was an American-bred mare who won one minor race from eleven starts in Britain in 1983 and 1984. She was a female-line descendant of the American racemare Gallorette.

== Racing career ==
=== 1996: two-year-old season ===
Air Express began his racing career in a maiden race over six furlongs at Yarmouth Racecourse on 5 June when he started at odds of 13/2 and finished second of the seven runners, beaten half a length by Quest Express. Despite his defeat he was stepped up to Group 3 class for his next three races: he finished third in the July Stakes at Newmarket, fourth in the Vintage Stakes at Goodwood and third in the Solario Stakes at Sandown. On 19 September the colt was dropped back in class for a minor event on good to firm ground at Yarmouth and recorded his first victory as he led from the start and won at odds of 5/4 by one and three quarter lengths from Grand Lad. The colt was tried over one mile in the Group 2 Royal Lodge Stakes at Ascot Racecourse ten days later and came home sixth behind the future Epsom Derby winner Benny the Dip. On his final run of the year, Air Express started the 50/1 outsider in an eight-runner field for the Group 1 Dewhurst Stakes over seven furlongs at Newmarket on 18 October. After looking outpaced approaching the final furlong he stayed on strongly in the closing stages and finished third, beaten a head and a neck by In Command and Musical Pursuit with Bahamian Bounty in fourth and Desert King in sixth.

=== 1997: three-year-old season ===
On 17 April, Air Express began his second season in the Craven Stakes (a major trial race for the 2000 Guineas) at Newmarket in which he started at odds of 8/1 and finished fourth behind Desert Story, Grapeshot and Cape Cross. Although he bypassed the English 2000 Guineas Air Express won the equivalent races in two countries. Ten days after his defeat at Newmarket the colt was sent to Italy to contest the Premio Parioli over 1600 metres at Capannelle Racecourse in Rome. After recovering from a slow start, he launched a sustained challenge on the outside, took the lead in the final stride and won by a nose from Risiat. At Cologne in Germany on 19 May Air Express was one of thirteen runners for the Mehl Mulhens Rennen over 1600 metres. He was among the leaders from the start, went to the front 400 metres from the finish and came home one and a quarter lengths clear of Is Tirol, with the French-trained Fine Fellow half a length back in third place.

Although he was coming off two major wins, Air Express was made a 20/1 outsider when he returned to England for the St James's Palace Stakes at Royal Ascot in June. He belied his odds as he kept on well in the straight to take second place behind Starborough, with Daylami, Desert King and In Command finishing behind. In the Sussex Stakes at Goodwood on 30 July the colt was matched against older horses for the first time and made little impact, coming home seventh of the nine runners behind the four-year-old Ali-Royal. The French jockey Olivier Peslier took over from Doyle when Air Express started at odds of 9/1 for the Group 1 Queen Elizabeth II Stakes over one mile at Ascot on 27 September. Revoque started favourite, while the other seven runners included Entrepreneur, Bijou d'Inde, Rebecca Sharp, Allied Forces (Queen Anne Stakes) and Bahhare (Champagne Stakes). Peslier restrained the colt at the rear of the field before making rapid progress on the final turn and then switching left to make his challenge on the outside in the straight. He took the lead approaching the final furlong and held off the late challenge of Rebecca Sharp to win by a short head in a photo finish. The racecourse stewards asked Clive Brittain to account for the colt's improved performance but accepted the trainer's explanation that Air Express had been unsuited by the camber at Goodwood. After the race Brittain said "I knew this was a Group 1 horse, and if I hadn't given up betting when I started training, I would have lumped on... I thought Olivier gave him a dream of a ride. We thought his style would suit the little horse"

=== 1998: four-year-old season ===
Air Express remained in training as a four-year-old but failed to reproduce his best form. At Newbury Racecourse on 16 May he started favourite for the Lockinge Stakes but never looked likely to win and came home seventh of the ten runners behind Cape Cross. A drop back in distance brought no improvement as he finished fourth of the five runners behind Donkey Engine in the Prix de la Porte Maillot over 1400 metres at Longchamp Racecourse on 21 June.

== Stud record ==
Air Express was retired from racing to become a breeding stallion. He had little chance to prove himself, as he died in 2000 at the age of six, after siring two crops of foals. The best of his offspring was the filly Airwave, who won the Cheveley Park Stakes and was the granddam of Churchill and Clemmie.

== Pedigree ==
Pedigree of Air Express (IRE), bay stallion, 1994
Sire Salse (USA) 1985	Topsider (USA); 1974	Northern Dancer (CAN)	Nearctic
Sire Salse (USA) 1985	Topsider (USA); 1974	Northern Dancer (CAN)	Natalma (USA)
Sire Salse (USA) 1985	Topsider (USA); 1974	Drumtop	Round Table
Sire Salse (USA) 1985	Topsider (USA); 1974	Drumtop	Zonah
Sire Salse (USA) 1985	Carnival Princess (USA); 1974	Prince John	Princequillo (IRE)
Sire Salse (USA) 1985	Carnival Princess (USA); 1974	Prince John	Not Afraid
Sire Salse (USA) 1985	Carnival Princess (USA); 1974	Carnival Queen	Amerigo (GB)
Sire Salse (USA) 1985	Carnival Princess (USA); 1974	Carnival Queen	Circus Ring
Dam Ibtisamm (USA) 1981	Caucasus (USA); 1972	Nijinsky (CAN)	Northern Dancer
Dam Ibtisamm (USA) 1981	Caucasus (USA); 1972	Nijinsky (CAN)	Flaming Page
Dam Ibtisamm (USA) 1981	Caucasus (USA); 1972	Quill	Princequillo (IRE)
Dam Ibtisamm (USA) 1981	Caucasus (USA); 1972	Quill	Quick Touch
Dam Ibtisamm (USA) 1981	Lorgnette (IRE); 1964	High Hat (GB)	Hyperion
Dam Ibtisamm (USA) 1981	Lorgnette (IRE); 1964	High Hat (GB)	Madonna
Dam Ibtisamm (USA) 1981	Lorgnette (IRE); 1964	Mlle Lorette (USA)	Lovely Night
Dam Ibtisamm (USA) 1981	Lorgnette (IRE); 1964	Mlle Lorette (USA)	Gallorette (Family: 17-b)

- Air Express was inbred 3 × 4 to Northern Dancer, meaning that this stallion appears in both he third and fourth generations of his pedigree. He was also inbred 4 × 4 to Princequillo.
