= Vadeni (horse) =

French Thoroughbred racehorse and sire

- Sire: Churchill
- Grandsire: Galileo
- Dam: Vaderana
- Damsire: Monsun
- Sex: Colt
- Foaled: 26 March 2019
- Country: France
- Color: Bay
- Breeder: Aga Khan IV
- Owner: Aga Khan IV
- Trainer: Jean-Claude Rouget
- Record: 11: 5-1-2
- Earnings: £2,341,634

Major wins
- Criterium du Fonds Europeen de l'Elevage (2021); Prix de Guiche (2022); Prix du Jockey Club (2022); Eclipse Stakes (2022); Timeform rating: 130
- Last updated on 12 October 2022

Vadeni (foaled 26 March 2019) is a French Thoroughbred racehorse and sire. He showed promise as a juvenile in 2021 when he won two of his three races, including the Listed Criterium du Fonds Europeen de l'Elevage. In the following spring he won the Prix de Guiche and then ran out a five-length winner of the Group One French Derby. In July, the horse won the Eclipse Stakes before being placed in the Irish Champion Stakes and finishing a close second in the Prix de l'Arc de Triomphe.

== Background ==
Vadeni is a bay colt with a white star and two white socks bred in France by his owner Aga Khan IV. He was sent into training with Jean-Claude Rouget.

He was from the first crop of foals sired by Churchill who was the Cartier Champion Two-year-old Colt in 2016 and went on to win the 2000 Guineas and the Irish 2000 Guineas in the following year. Vadeni's dam Vaderana won one minor race from five starts in France, and was a half-sister to several winners including Vadamar (Prix du Conseil de Paris) and The Pentagon (Tyros Stakes). As a descendant of the broodmare Vadlava she was related to Val Royal, Valixir, Valyra and Vazira.

== Racing career ==
=== 2021: two-year-old season ===
Vadeni began his track career in a maiden race over 1400 metres on good ground at La Teste-de-Buch racecourse on 26 July when he started 1.1/1 favourite against seven opponents. Ridden by Jean-Bernard Eyquem he made a successful debut as he won by lengths from Loubeisien. On 14 August at Deauville Racecourse the colt was stepped up in class and distance for the Listed Criterium du Fonds Europeen de l'Elevage over 1600 metres when he was ridden by Christophe Soumillon, who became his regular jockey. Starting the 1.5/1 favourite in a six-runner field he won again as he came home two lengths clear of the Andre Fabre-trained Officer of State. On his final appearance of the year Vadeni started odds on favourite for the Group 3 Prix de Conde over 1800 metres at Longchamp Racecourse on 29 September but finished third behind El Bodegon and True Testament after looking to be outpaced in the closing stages.

=== 2022: three-year-old season ===
Vadeni began his second season on 17 April at Longchamp Racecourse when he came home fifth behind his stablemate Welwal in the Group 3 Prix de Fontainebleau. Despite his defeat Vadeni started favourite when he lined up for the Group 3 Prix de Guiche over 1800 metres at Chantilly on 10 May when the best fancied of his six opponents was the Prix Omnium II winner Dreamflight. After racing towards the rear of the field in the early stages, Vadeni moved into contention on the final turn, took the lead approaching the last 200 metres and won "readily" by two and a half lengths from Machete. After the race Rouget said "watching the race I was awfully confident. Vadeni was perfectly relaxed and that's what you want with him. He's not complicated, he just needs to be in the right rhythm and ridden from behind... I think it is a perfect prep for the Prix du Jockey Club."

On 5 June at Chantilly Vadeni started the 6.8/1 third choice in the betting behind Modern Games and Al Hakeem (Prix de Suresnes) in the Prix du Jockey Club over 2100 metres. The other twelve contenders El Bodegon, Machete, Welwal, Ancient Rome (Prix des Chenes), Onesto (Prix Greffulhe) and Mister Saint Paul (Prix La Force). Soumillon tracked the leaders as Modern Games set the pace before Vadeni moved up "smoothly" on the outside and went to the front 300 metres from the finish. He drew away in the closing stages and won in "impressive" style by five lengths from El Bodegon despite being eased down in the final strides. After the race Soumillon said "after one light tap with the whip, he completely took off. It was impressive and I certainly didn't expect what he did there. It was something totally out of the ordinary", while Rouget commented "I knew he was a horse with a lot of talent even if he is not over-big and today he just exploded... He did it in great style and now he'll need to really show us what he's made of because he didn’t just win today, he strolled away with it. It's a few years since I've seen a horse run away with this race and there were good horses in behind."

=== 2023: four-year-old season ===
In August 2023, Vadeni was retired to stud, to stand at the Aga Khan's flagsip stud in France, Haras de Bonneval.

== Pedigree ==
Pedigree of Vadeni (FR), bay colt, 2019
Sire Churchill (IRE) 2014	Galileo (IRE); 1998	Sadler's Wells (USA)	Northern Dancer (CAN)
Sire Churchill (IRE) 2014	Galileo (IRE); 1998	Sadler's Wells (USA)	Fairy Bridge
Sire Churchill (IRE) 2014	Galileo (IRE); 1998	Urban Sea (USA)	Miswaki
Sire Churchill (IRE) 2014	Galileo (IRE); 1998	Urban Sea (USA)	Allegretta (GB)
Sire Churchill (IRE) 2014	Meow (IRE); 2008	Storm Cat (USA)	Storm Bird (CAN)
Sire Churchill (IRE) 2014	Meow (IRE); 2008	Storm Cat (USA)	Terlingua (USA)
Sire Churchill (IRE) 2014	Meow (IRE); 2008	Airwave (USA)	Air Express (IRE)
Sire Churchill (IRE) 2014	Meow (IRE); 2008	Airwave (USA)	Kangra Valley
Dam Vaderana (FR) 2009	Monsun (GER); 1990	Königsstuhl (horse)	Dschingis Khan
Dam Vaderana (FR) 2009	Monsun (GER); 1990	Königsstuhl (horse)	Konigskronung
Dam Vaderana (FR) 2009	Monsun (GER); 1990	Moselle	Surumu
Dam Vaderana (FR) 2009	Monsun (GER); 1990	Moselle	Monasia
Dam Vaderana (FR) 2009	Vadawina (IRE); 2002	Unfuwain (USA)	Northern Dancer (CAN)
Dam Vaderana (FR) 2009	Vadawina (IRE); 2002	Unfuwain (USA)	Height of Fashion (FR)
Dam Vaderana (FR) 2009	Vadawina (IRE); 2002	Vadaza (FR)	Zafonic (USA)
Dam Vaderana (FR) 2009	Vadawina (IRE); 2002	Vadaza (FR)	Vadlamixa (Family: 20-d)

- Vadeni is inbred 4 × 4 to Northern Dancer, meaning that this stallion appears twice in the fourth generation of his pedigree.
