= Clemmie =

Irish-bred Thoroughbred racehorse

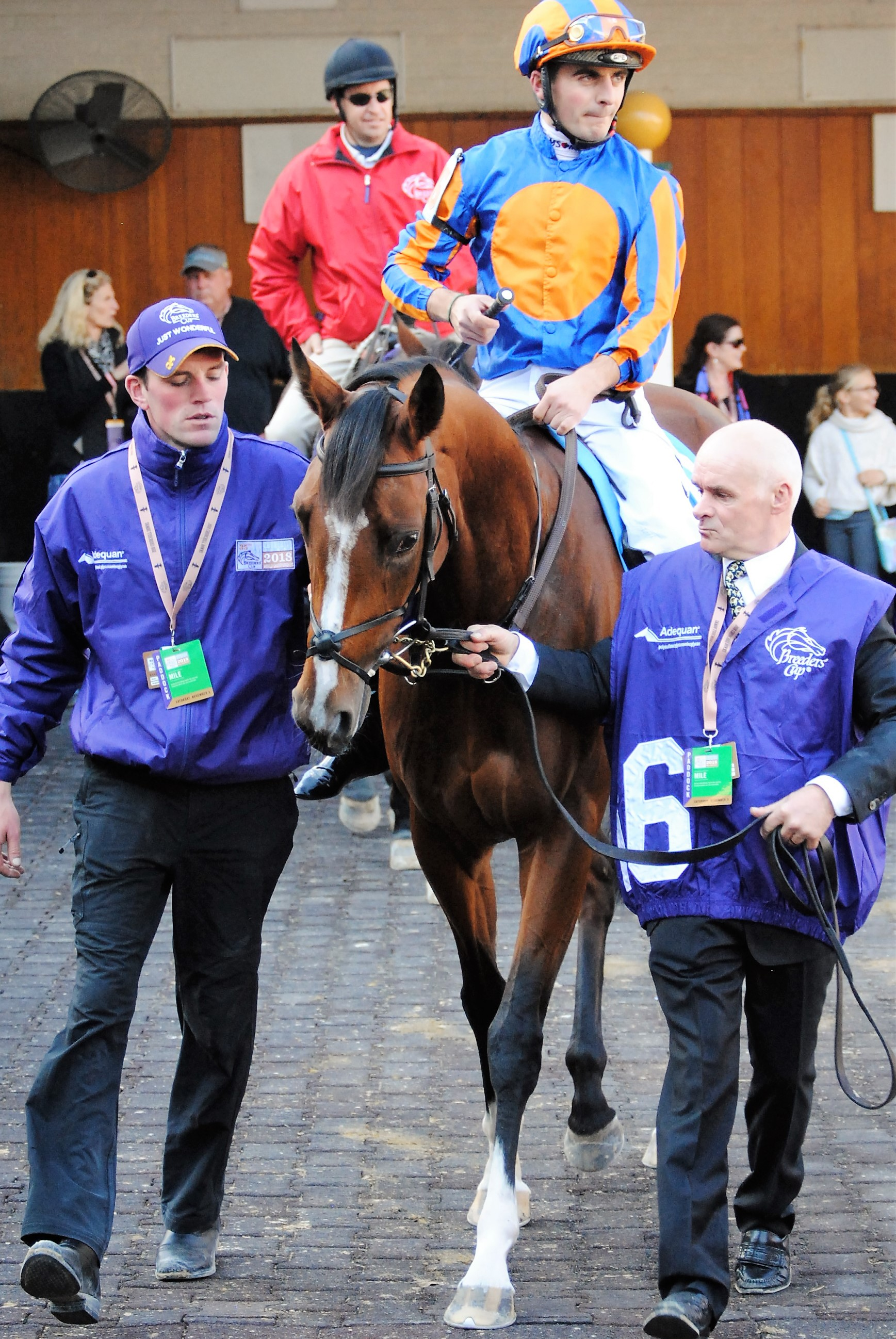
- Clemmie at the 2018 Breeders' Cup
- Sire: Galileo
- Grandsire: Sadler's Wells
- Dam: Meow
- Damsire: Storm Cat
- Sex: Filly
- Foaled: 14 February 2015
- Country: Ireland
- Colour: Bay
- Breeder: Liberty Bloodstock
- Owner: Michael Tabor, Derrick Smith & Sue Magnier
- Trainer: Aidan O'Brien
- Record: 11: 3-0-3
- Earnings: £266,147

Major wins
- Grangecon Stud Stakes (2017); Duchess of Cambridge Stakes (2017); Cheveley Park Stakes (2017)

Awards
- Top-rated European 2-y-o filly (2017)

Clemmie (foaled 14 February 2015) is an Irish Thoroughbred racehorse. As a two-year-old in 2017 she was beaten in her first two races but then won the Grangecon Stud Stakes, Duchess of Cambridge Stakes and Cheveley Park Stakes, ending the year as the highest-rated juvenile filly in Europe. She failed to win in six starts in the following year and was retired at the end of the season.

== Background ==
Clemmie is a bay filly with a white blaze and three white socks bred in Ireland by Liberty Bloodstock, a breeding company associated with the Coolmore Stud organisation. The filly was sent into training with Aidan O'Brien at Ballydoyle and has been ridden in most of her races by Ryan Moore. Like many Coolmore horses, the official details of her ownership have changed from race to race: she has sometimes been listed as being the property of Susan Magnier, while on other occasions she has been described as being owned by a partnership of Derrick Smith, Michael Tabor and Susan Magnier. The filly was named after Clementine Churchill.

She was sired by Galileo, who won the Derby, Irish Derby and King George VI and Queen Elizabeth Stakes in 2001. Galileo is now one of the world's leading stallions and has been champion sire of Great Britain and Ireland nine times so far. His other progeny include Cape Blanco, Frankel, Golden Lilac, Nathaniel, New Approach, Rip Van Winkle, Found, Minding and Ruler of the World. Clemmie's dam Meow showed good form as a juvenile in 2010, finishing second in the Queen Mary Stakes and winning the Listed Grangecon Stud Stakes. Meow was a daughter of the outstanding filly Airwave and closely related to the leading sprinter Jwala. Meow herself had previously produced Clemmie's full-brother Churchill.

== Racing career ==
=== 2017: two-year-old season ===
Clemmie was ridden in all five of her races as a two-year-old by Ryan Moore. On her racecourse debut she started at odds of 5/1 in a maiden race over six furlongs at the Racecourse on 27 May in which he came from well off the pace to finish a close third behind Gasta and Now You're Talking. Despite her defeat she was stepped up in class and sent to England for the Group 3 Albany Stakes at Royal Ascot in June in which he came home seventh of the twenty runners behind the French filly Different League. On 2 July at the Curragh, Clemmie started 6/4 favourite for the Grangecon Stud Stakes and recorded her first success, taking the lead approaching the final furlong and drawing away to win by two and three quarter lengths from her stablemate Butterscotch.

Twelve days after her win at the Curragh, Clemmie was sent to England for the second time and started 11/8 favourite for the Duchess of Cambridge Stakes at Newmarket Racecourse. After tracking the leaders she went to the front a furlong and drew away in closing stages to win by one and three-quarter lengths from the Chesham Stakes runner-up Nyaleti. After the race Ryan Moore said "She's just progressed with every run. I thought she did that very easily. I'd say she is the best filly we've seen out this year."

On 30 September Clemmie returned to Newmarket for the Group 1 Cheveley Park Stakes and was made the 15/8 favourite. Her ten opponents included Different League, Now You're Talking, Threading (Lowther Stakes), Madeline (Rose Bowl Stakes) and Eirene (St Hugh's Stakes). Clemmie was always going well and went to the front approaching the final furlong. Different League emerged as her only serious challenger but Clemmie drew away from the French challenger in the closing stages to win by one and three quarter lengths. Ryan Moore commented She's very, very high-class and travelled beautifully throughout. It was a messy enough sort of race, but she always had herself in the right position, she was very comfortable and always felt in control".

In the official European Classification for 2017, Clemmie was rated the best two-year-old filly of the season, seven pounds behind the top colt U S Navy Flag.

=== 2018: three-year-old season ===
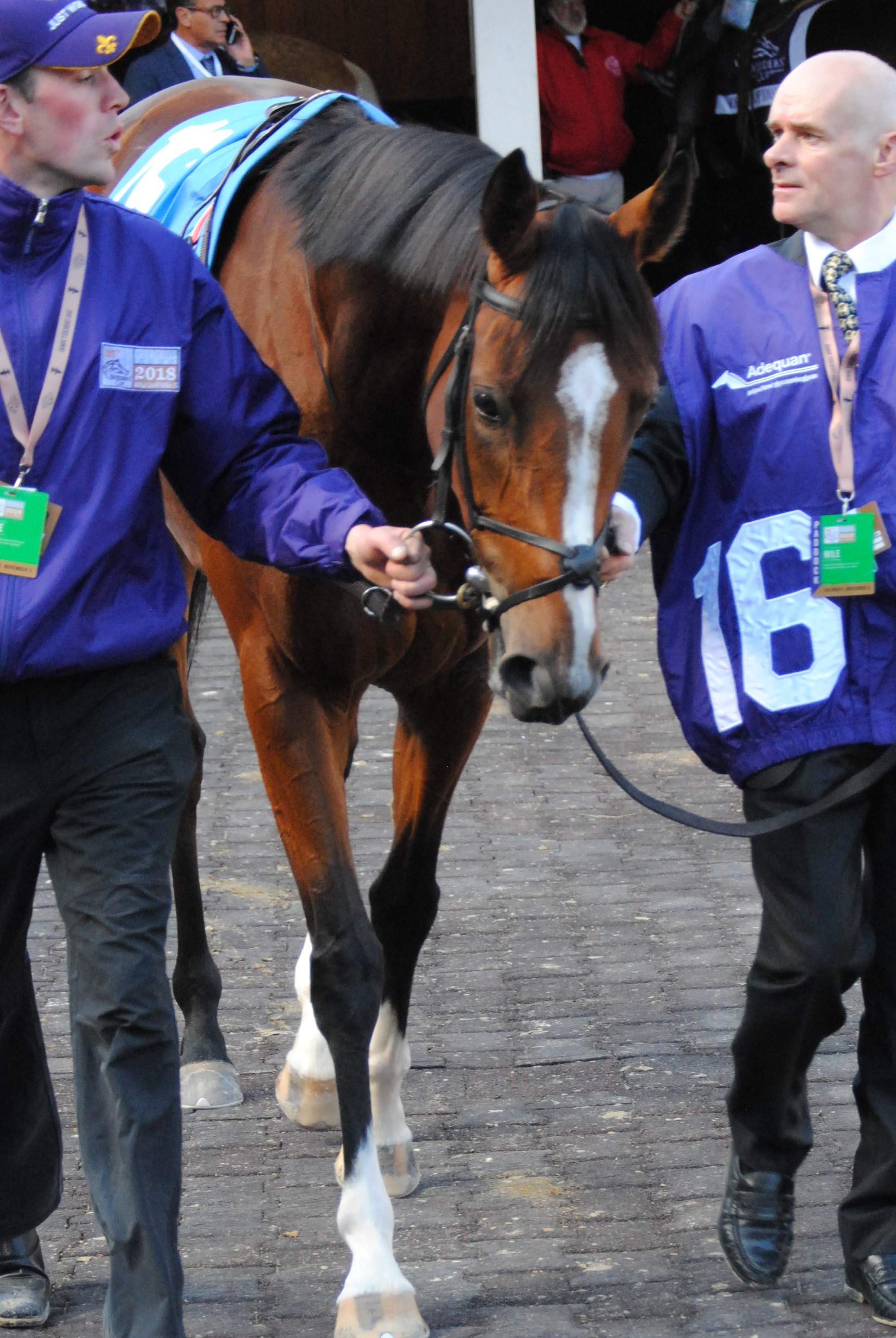
Clemmie at the 2018 Breeders' Cup

Clemmie had a slight training setback in spring which prevented her from running in the 1000 Guineas. The filly returned from an eight-month absence to contest the Irish 1,000 Guineas over one mile at the Curragh on 27 May. Ridden by Seamie Heffernan she started the 13/2 fourth choice in the betting but never looked likely to win and came home ninth of the thirteen runners behind Alpha Centauri. In the Coronation Stakes at Royal Ascot in June she started 4/1 second favourite but again proved no match for Alpha Centauri and finished fifth. In July she faced Alpha Centauri yet again in the Falmouth Stakes at Newmarket and finished third, beaten five and a half lengths by the winner. In the Matron Stakes at Leopardstown Racecourse in September she started a 20/1 outsider and finished a close third behind Laurens and Alpha Centauri. In October she finished unplaced behind Laurens in the Sun Chariot Stakes at Newmarket. On her final run, Clemmie was sent to Churchill Downs for the Breeders' Cup Mile on 3 November. She finished sixth of the fourteen runners, beaten two and a half lengths by the winner Expert Eye.

== Pedigree ==
Pedigree of Clemmie (IRE), bay filly, 2015
Sire Galileo (IRE) 1998	Sadler's Wells (USA); 1981	Northern Dancer	Nearctic
Sire Galileo (IRE) 1998	Sadler's Wells (USA); 1981	Northern Dancer	Natalma
Sire Galileo (IRE) 1998	Sadler's Wells (USA); 1981	Fairy Bridge	Bold Reason
Sire Galileo (IRE) 1998	Sadler's Wells (USA); 1981	Fairy Bridge	Special
Sire Galileo (IRE) 1998	Urban Sea (USA) ch. 1989	Miswaki	Mr. Prospector
Sire Galileo (IRE) 1998	Urban Sea (USA) ch. 1989	Miswaki	Hopespringseternal
Sire Galileo (IRE) 1998	Urban Sea (USA) ch. 1989	Allegretta	Lombard
Sire Galileo (IRE) 1998	Urban Sea (USA) ch. 1989	Allegretta	Anatevka
Dam Meow (IRE) 2008	Storm Cat (USA); 1983	Storm Bird	Northern Dancer
Dam Meow (IRE) 2008	Storm Cat (USA); 1983	Storm Bird	South Ocean
Dam Meow (IRE) 2008	Storm Cat (USA); 1983	Terlingua	Secretariat
Dam Meow (IRE) 2008	Storm Cat (USA); 1983	Terlingua	Crimson Saint
Dam Meow (IRE) 2008	Airwave (GB); 2000	Air Express	Salse
Dam Meow (IRE) 2008	Airwave (GB); 2000	Air Express	Ibtisamm
Dam Meow (IRE) 2008	Airwave (GB); 2000	Kangra Valley	Indian Ridge
Dam Meow (IRE) 2008	Airwave (GB); 2000	Kangra Valley	Thorner Lane (Family 19-a)

- Clemmie is inbred 3 × 4 to Northern Dancer, meaning that this stallion appears in both the third and fourth generations of her pedigree.
