= Airwave (horse) =

British-bred Thoroughbred racehorse

- Sire: Air Express
- Grandsire: Salse
- Dam: Kangra Valley
- Damsire: Indian Ridge
- Sex: Mare
- Foaled: 12 February 2000
- Country: United Kingdom
- Colour: Bay
- Breeder: Richard and Tessa Watson
- Owner: Henry Candy & Partners; Sue Magnier & Michael Tabor
- Trainer: Henry Candy; Aidan O'Brien
- Record: 22: 6-3-4
- Earnings: £405,116

Major wins
- Firth of Clyde Stakes (2002); Cheveley Park Stakes (2002); Temple Stakes (2003); Land O'Burns Fillies' Stakes (2004); Ridgewood Pearl Stakes (2005)

Airwave (foaled 12 February 2000) is a British Thoroughbred racehorse and broodmare. Competing almost exclusively in sprints she won six of her twenty-two starts in a racing career which lasted from July 2002 until June 2005. She was one of the fastest juveniles of her generation in 2002 when she won the Firth of Clyde Stakes and then recorded an upset victory over Russian Rhythm in the Cheveley Park Stakes. In the following year she won the Temple Stakes and was placed in the Golden Jubilee Stakes, July Cup and Haydock Sprint Cup. She was not as good as a four-year-old, but did win the Land O'Burns Fillies' Stakes and finished second in the Diadem Stakes. She was sold to Irish interests and ran three times as a five-year-old, winning the Ridgewood Pearl Stakes before being retired to begin a second career as a broodmare.

== Background ==
Airwave is a bay mare with a white star bred by Richard and Tessa Watson of the Manor House Stud in Rutland. The Watsons later recalled her as "a lovely foal... the pick of the bunch that year". Her sire Air Express was a miler who had his biggest success when winning the Queen Elizabeth II Stakes in 1997. He stood as a breeding stallion for only two seasons before dying in 2000 at the age of six, with Airwave being the best of his offspring. Airwave' dam, Kangra Valley, won one minor event at Thirsk Racecourse in a sixteen race career. After foaling Airwave, she went on to produce the Nunthorpe Stakes winner Jwala.

In September 2001 the filly was consigned to the St Leger Yearling Sale at Doncaster. She was not an impressive looking yearling having suffered from illness and the auction ended after a bid of 12,000 guineas by the trainer Henry Candy. Candy later sold shares in the filly to some of his patrons including Sir Arthur Norman but retained a significant portion of her ownership and took her into training at his Kingston Warren stable in Oxfordshire.

== Racing career ==
=== 2002: two-year-old season ===
Airwave made her racecourse debut in a maiden race over six furlongs at Kempton Park Racecourse on 17 July 2002 in which she started 2/1 favourite but was beaten half a length by Soviet Song. The winner took the Fillies' Mile later that year and went on to win four more Group One races. In a similar event at Leicester Racecourse two weeks later she started odds-on favourite against seven opponents and won by a length from Aegean Line. In a training gallop in August, the two-year-old was tried against the stable's star sprinter Kyllachy, a four-year-old colt, and produced what Candy later described as "sensational" performance, whilst Chris Rutter, who partnered the filly in all her races that year reportedly commented "Oh my god!".

Airwave was then matched against male opposition as she was one of twenty-one juveniles to contest the St Leger Yearling Stakes (restricted to horses auctioned at the eponymous sale) at Doncaster Racecourse on 11 September. She started slowly and was hampered when moving forward two furlongs out before staying on to finish fourth behind Somnus, Mister Links and Crimson Silk. Ten days after her defeat at Doncaster Airwave was sent to Scotland for the Listed Firth of Clyde Stakes at Ayr Racecourse and started the 2/1 favourite in a ten-runner field. She again started slowly and Rutter was forced to switch the filly to the left to avoid interference approaching the final furlong. She took the lead in the closing stages and won by one and a half lengths and a head from Irresistible and Miss Takertwo. After the race Candy made no secret of his admiration for the filly saying "I've never had a two-year-old like her, and that includes Wind and Wuthering, who won the Dewhurst by seven lengths. The reason she's taken until now to show what she's capable of, is because she's been so mentally immature – it took us six months to get her near a set of stalls".

On 4 October, Airwave was stepped up to Group One class for the Cheveley Park Stakes over six furlongs at Newmarket Racecourse. Russian Rhythm, the winner of the Princess Margaret Stakes and Lowther Stakes started odds-on favourite ahead of the Geoff Wragg-trained Ego with Airwave third choice in the betting on 11/2. The other three runners were Bella Tusa (Dragon Stakes, Harry Rosebery Stakes), Danaskaya (runner-up in the Lowther Stakes) and Wimple (Dick Poole Fillies' Stakes). Airwave started slowly and was held up by Rutter as Wimple set the early pace, but began to make progress after half way. Russian Rhythm went to the front a quarter of a mile from the finish, but Airwave overtook her to gain the lead approaching the final furlong and stayed on to win by one and a half lengths. The favourite held on for second with Danaskaya taking third place ahead of Ego. The win gave the 39-year-old Rutter the first Group One winner of his twenty-year career, a day before his retirement from the saddle. He commented "This is the cream. She's a horse I'd love to ride next season but it won't happen – I've made up my mind [to retire]".

=== 2003: three-year-old season ===
As Candy had predicted after her win in the Cheveley Park, Airwave's connections made no attempt to campaign her over longer distances as a three-year-old, opting instead for a sprinting campaign. On her seasonal debut she was matched against colts and older, more experienced horses in the Group Two Temple Stakes over five furlongs at Sandown Park Racecourse on 26 May and started 5/2 joint-favourite with the four-year-old Acclamation. Ridden by Dane O'Neill, who partnered her in seven of her next eight races, she started even more slowly than usual, losing around five lengths and racing at the rear of the seven-runner field in the early stages. She began to make rapid headway in the last quarter mile, took the lead inside the final furlong and drew away to win by three lengths from the ten-year-old gelding Repertory. After the race Candy commented "I wasn't as nervous as I should have been. I have seen her do the most amazing things. Four lengths is an awful lot to give away against the old professionals, but I wasn't that worried. Dane got there too soon, took a pull, went again and still got there too soon."

At Royal Ascot in June the filly started 11/8 favourite against sixteen opponents in the Group One Golden Jubilee Stakes over six furlongs. After her customary slow start she raced down the centre of the course and moved into second place a furlong out but was beaten half a length by the Australian colt Choisir. Kieren Fallon took the ride three weeks later when the filly contested the July Cup at Newmarket and finished third of the sixteen runners behind Oasis Dream and Choisir.

After a summer break, Airwave returned for the Haydock Sprint Cup on 6 September. With O'Neill again in the saddle she started the 100/30 second favourite and stayed on in the closing stages to take third place behind Somnus and Oasis Dream. The filly failed to reproduce her best form in two subsequent races. She started favourite for the Diadem Stakes at Ascot but failed to recover from interference in the last quarter mile and finished sixth to Acclamation. She was again made favourite when sent to France for the Prix de l'Abbaye at Longchamp Racecourse on 5 October, but again had trouble obtaining a clear run and finished unplaced behind Patavellian.

=== 2004: four-year-old season ===
Airwave remained in training as a four-year-old and won once from eight races. In the first half of the season she finished sixth in the Duke of York Stakes, sixth behind Fayr Jag in the Golden Jubilee Stakes and ninth behind Frizzante in the July Cup. She was then dropped in class for the Listed Land o'Burns Fillies' Stakes over five furlongs at Ayr Racecourse on 19 July. Ridden by Darryll Holland she started at odds of 4/6 in a ten-runner field, took the lead a furlong out, and won by one and a quarter lengths from Forever Phoenix. After the race Holland commented "that was a good exercise gallop, she won very easily". Competing at the highest level again, Airwave was well-beaten in her next two races, finishing sixth behind Bahamian Pirate in the Nunthorpe Stakes and eleventh behind Tante Rose in the Haydock Sprint Cup. In her two remaining races that year she finished third to The Tatling in the World Trophy and second when favourite for the Diadem Stakes.

At the Tattersalls sale in November 2004, Airwave was offered for sale as a potential broodmare. A fierce bidding duel ensued involving representatives of the Lodge Park Stud and the Japanese breeder Katsumi Yoshida before she was bought for 550,000 guineas (45 times her yearling price) by the bloodstock agency BBA Ireland on behalf of the Coolmore Stud organisation. Henry Candy commented "It's obviously a very sad day but it's a great price and she has gone to a lovely home. She really has been the yard for the last few years and has huge character".

=== 2005: five-year-old season ===
For the 2005 season, Airwave joined the majority of Coolmore's European racehorses at Ballydoyle where she was trained by Aidan O'Brien. She raced in the colours of Sue Magnier and Michael Tabor.

On her first appearance for her new trainer, the filly was tried over seven furlongs for the first time in the Athasi Stakes at the Curragh in April and started 5/2 joint favourite in an eight-runner field. Ridden by Fallon she took the lead two furlongs out but was caught in the final strides and beaten into third by the three-year-olds Hazariya and Sky High Flyer. Airwave was stepped up again in distance for Group Two Ridgewood Pearl Stakes over one mile at the Curragh on 21 May and started 11/8 joint favourite alongside the British-trained four-year-old Kinnaird. Fallon restrained the filly at the back of the five runner field before making progress approaching the final furlong. She took the lead 100 yards from the finish and won by three quarters of a length from Miss Trish, with Kinnaird a length away in third. In June she returned to Britain for the Royal meeting, run that year at York Racecourse, in which she finished sixth behind Peeress in the Windsor Forest Stakes.

== Breeding record ==
Airwave was retired from racing to become a broodmare for Liberty Bloodstock, a breeding company associated with the Coolmore Stud. To date (December 2015), she has produced at least six foals and four winners:

- Nehalennia, a chestnut filly, foaled in 2007, sired by Giant's Causeway. Won one race.
- Meow, bay filly, 2008, by Storm Cat. Won two races including the Listed Grangecon Stud Stakes, and finished second in the Queen Mary Stakes. Dam of Churchill and Clemmie.
- Aloof, bay filly, 2009, by Galileo. Won three races including the Lanwades Stud Fillies' Stakes. Sold for $3.9 million in 2014.
- Orator, bay colt, 2010, by Galileo. Won three races including the Listed Grand Prix Anjou Bretagne.
- Fairytale Ending, bay filly, 2012, by Galileo. Unraced.
- Hudson Canyon, bay colt, 2013, by Galileo. Unplaced in first race.

== Pedigree ==
Pedigree of Airwave (GB), bay mare, 2000
Sire Air Express (IRE) 1994	Salse (USA); 1985	Topsider	Northern Dancer
Sire Air Express (IRE) 1994	Salse (USA); 1985	Topsider	Drumtop
Sire Air Express (IRE) 1994	Salse (USA); 1985	Carnival Princess	Prince John
Sire Air Express (IRE) 1994	Salse (USA); 1985	Carnival Princess	Carnival Queen
Sire Air Express (IRE) 1994	Ibtisamm (USA); 1981	Caucasus	Nijinsky
Sire Air Express (IRE) 1994	Ibtisamm (USA); 1981	Caucasus	Quill
Sire Air Express (IRE) 1994	Ibtisamm (USA); 1981	Lorgnette	High Hat
Sire Air Express (IRE) 1994	Ibtisamm (USA); 1981	Lorgnette	Mlle Lorette
Dam Kangra Valley (GB) 1991	Indian Ridge (IRE); 1985	Ahonoora	Lorenzaccio
Dam Kangra Valley (GB) 1991	Indian Ridge (IRE); 1985	Ahonoora	Helen Nichols
Dam Kangra Valley (GB) 1991	Indian Ridge (IRE); 1985	Hillbrow	Swing Easy
Dam Kangra Valley (GB) 1991	Indian Ridge (IRE); 1985	Hillbrow	Golden City
Dam Kangra Valley (GB) 1991	Thorner Lane (GB); 1985	Tina's Pet	Mummy's Pet
Dam Kangra Valley (GB) 1991	Thorner Lane (GB); 1985	Tina's Pet	Merry Weather
Dam Kangra Valley (GB) 1991	Thorner Lane (GB); 1985	Spinner	Blue Cashmere
Dam Kangra Valley (GB) 1991	Thorner Lane (GB); 1985	Spinner	Penny Pincher (Family: 19-a)
