= Bianca Nera =

British-bred Thoroughbred racehorse

- Racing silks of Simon Frisby
- Sire: Salse
- Grandsire: Topsider
- Dam: Birch Creek
- Damsire: Carwhite
- Sex: Mare
- Foaled: 11 April 1994
- Country: United Kingdom
- Colour: Bay
- Breeder: S McCreery and Stowell Hill Ltd
- Owner: Simon Frisby
- Trainer: David Loder
- Record: 6: 3-0-0
- Earnings: £136,584

Major wins
- Lowther Stakes (1996); Moyglare Stud Stakes (1996)

Bianca Nera (foaled 11 April 1994) was a British Thoroughbred racehorse and broodmare. She showed her best form as a two-year-old in 1996 when she won the first three of her four races including the Lowther Stakes and the Moyglare Stud Stakes. She was retired from racing after two disappointing runs in the spring of 1997. As a broodmare she produced several minor winners including the dam of the multiple Group 1 winner Postponed.

== Background ==
Bianca Nera was a bay mare with no white markings bred by Bob McCreery's Somerset-based Stowell Hill breeding company. As a yearling in November 1995 she was sent to the Tattersalls sale and was bought for 23,000 guineas by the British Bloodstock Agency. During her racing career she was owned by Simon Frisby and trained at Newmarket, Suffolk by David Loder. She was ridden in all of her races by Kevin Darley.

She was sired by Salse who won the Prix de la Forêt in 1988, before becoming a successful breeding stallion. Although he showed his best form over seven furlongs, Salse was capable of producing horses who stayed much further, including Classic Cliche, Luso (Hong Kong Vase) and Timboroa (Turf Classic) as well as faster horses like Air Express (Queen Elizabeth II Stakes) and Lemon Souffle. Bianca Nera's dam Birch Creek produced several other winners including Hotelgenie Dot Com, the dam of Simply Perfect. She was a granddaughter of Aurorabella, a half sister to the dam of the 2000 Guineas winner Only for Life.

== Racing career ==
=== 1996: two-year-old season ===
The Loder stable had problems in the early part of 1996, with many of the horses being affected by illness. Bianca Nera made her racecourse debut in a maiden race over five furlongs at Beverley Racecourse on 15 August and started second favourite in an eight-runner field. After tracking the leaders in the early stages she went to the front a furlong and a half from the finish and won by one and a quarter lengths from Solfegietto. A week after her successful debut the filly was stepped up sharply in class to contest the Group 2 Lowther Stakes over six furlongs at York Racecourse and started at odds of 6/1. The Princess Margaret Stakes winner Seebe started favourite while the other seven runners included Carmine Lake, the winner of the Molecomb Stakes. Bianca Nera took the lead at half way and kept on well in the closing stages to win by a neck and half a length from Arethusa and Seebe. After the race David Loder said "This makes up for a lot of the frustrations earlier in the year. I'm just now beginning to run most of the two-year-olds as they've been sick".

On 8 September Bianca Nera was sent to Ireland and movedd up to Group 1 level to contest the Moyglare Stud Stakes over seven furlongs at the Curragh. She was made the 3/1 second favourite behind Crystal Crossing (Rose Bowl Stakes) in a ten-runner field which also included Ryafan, Family Tradition (Debutante Stakes), Azra (Silver Flash Stakes) an Air of Distinction (Anglesey Stakes). Bianca Nera settled well but had to be switched to the left a furlong out after failing to obtain a clear run. In a five horse "blanket finish" Bianca Nera hit the front in the final strides and won by half a length, a neck, a head and half a length from Ryafan, Azra, Velvet Appeal and Star Profile. Loder explained that the filly had been "crying out" for longer distances and said, "As the Moyglare Stud Stakes was the only Group One over seven furlongs, we decided to supplement her. She has a tremendous temperament and a tremendous constitution, and that is the third time she has raced within a month."

A month after her win at the Curragh Bianca Nera was sent to France for the Prix Marcel Boussac over 1400 metres at Longchamp Racecourse. Racing on softer ground than she had previously encountered she made steady progress in the straight but was unable to reach the leaders and finished fourth of the thirteen runners behind Ryafan.

=== 1997: three-year-old season ===
Bianca Nera began her second campaign in the Fred Darling Stakes (a trial race for the 1000 Guineas) over seven furlongs at Newbury Racecourse in April in which she came home sixth of the ten runners behind Dance Parade after being hampered a furlong from the finish. In the 1000 Guineas over the Rowley Mile at Newmarket on 4 May she started a 50/1 outsider and made no impact, finishing eleventh behind Sleepytime.

== Breeding record ==
Bianca Nera was retired from racing to become a broodmare. She produced at least eleven foal and six winners between 1999 and 2012:

- Pietra Dura, a bay filly, foaled in 1999, sired by Cadeaux Genereux. Won one race.
- Biondina, bay filly, 2000, by Darshaan. Unraced.
- Glencairn Star, colt (later gelded), 2001, by Selkirk. Won five races.
- Bijou a Moi, bay filly, 2002, by Rainbow Quest. Unraced.
- Bidding Time, bay filly, 2004, by Rock of Gibraltar. Failed to win in two races.
- Ever Rigg, bay filly, 2005, by Dubai Destination. Won one race, dam of Postponed.
- Italian Connection, bay filly, 2006, by Cadeaux Genereux. Unraced.
- Biaraafa, filly, 2006, by Araafa. Won two races.
- Bite of the Cherry, brown filly, 2009, by Dalakhani. Won one race.
- Powdermill, bay filly, 2010, by Oasis Dream. Unraced.
- Catalyst, chestnut filly, 2012, by Makfi. Won one race.

== Pedigree ==
Pedigree of Bianca Nera (IRE), bay mare, 1994
Sire Salse (USA) 1985	Topsider (USA); 1974	Northern Dancer	Nearctic
Sire Salse (USA) 1985	Topsider (USA); 1974	Northern Dancer	Natalma
Sire Salse (USA) 1985	Topsider (USA); 1974	Drumtop	Round Table
Sire Salse (USA) 1985	Topsider (USA); 1974	Drumtop	Zonah
Sire Salse (USA) 1985	Carnival Princess (USA); 1974	Prince John	Princequillo
Sire Salse (USA) 1985	Carnival Princess (USA); 1974	Prince John	Not Afraid
Sire Salse (USA) 1985	Carnival Princess (USA); 1974	Carnival Queen	Amerigo
Sire Salse (USA) 1985	Carnival Princess (USA); 1974	Carnival Queen	Circus Ring
Dam Birch Creek (GB) 1982	Carwhite (IRE); 1974	Caro	Fortino
Dam Birch Creek (GB) 1982	Carwhite (IRE); 1974	Caro	Chambord
Dam Birch Creek (GB) 1982	Carwhite (IRE); 1974	White Paper	Honeyway
Dam Birch Creek (GB) 1982	Carwhite (IRE); 1974	White Paper	Alba Nox
Dam Birch Creek (GB) 1982	Deed (GB); 1970	Derring-Do	Darius
Dam Birch Creek (GB) 1982	Deed (GB); 1970	Derring-Do	Sipsey Bridge
Dam Birch Creek (GB) 1982	Deed (GB); 1970	Aurorabella	Borealis
Dam Birch Creek (GB) 1982	Deed (GB); 1970	Aurorabella	Borobella (Family: 14-c)
