= Salse (horse) =

American-bred Thoroughbred racehorse

- Sire: Topsider
- Grandsire: Northern Dancer
- Dam: Carnival Princess
- Damsire: Prince John
- Sex: Stallion
- Foaled: 24 February 1985
- Country: United States
- Colour: Bay
- Breeder: Oxford Stable
- Owner: Sheikh Mohammed
- Trainer: Henry Cecil
- Record: 13: 8-4-1

Major wins
- Somerville Tattersall Stakes (1987); Beeswing Stakes (1988); Hungerford Stakes (1988); Park Stakes (1988); Challenge Stakes (1988); Prix de la Forêt (1988)

Salse (24 February 1985 – 13 June 2001) was an American-bred British-trained Thoroughbred racehorse. He was a consistent top-class performer who recorded his best results over a distance of seven furlongs. As a two-year-old in 1987 he won his first three races including the Somerville Tattersall Stakes before running third in the William Hill Futurity. In the following year he won the Beeswing Stakes, Hungerford Stakes, Park Stakes, Challenge Stakes and Prix de la Forêt. He finished second in his other three races, namely the Jersey Stakes, Bet With The Tote Trophy and Queen Elizabeth II Stakes. He retired at the end of the year with a record of eight wins, four seconds and one third place: the only horses to beat him were Warning, Indian Ridge, Emmson and Sheriff's Star. After his retirement from racing he became a successful breeding stallion.

== Background ==
Salse was a "rangy, useful-looking" bay horse with a large white star bred in Kentucky by Oxford Stable. As a yearling he was auctioned at the Keeneland September Yearling Sale and was bought for $190,000 by the bloodstock agent Tote Cherry-Downes. He was sent to race in Europe where he raced in the colours of Sheikh Mohammed and was trained by Henry Cecil at the Warren Place Stable in Newmarket, Suffolk.

His sire Topsider was just below top class as a racehorse, recording his biggest win in the Grade III Sport Page Handicap in 1978. As a breeding stallion the best of his other progeny included North Sider, Twafeaj and Assatis (Gran Premio del Jockey Club). Salse's dam Carnival Princess won one minor race from two starts, and was a half-sister to the Oaks d'Italia winner Carnauba. She was a great-granddaughter of the American broodmare Arena (foaled 1926) whose other descendants included Miswaki, Almutawakel, Manila and Tobougg.

== Racing career ==
=== 1987: two-year-old season ===
On the Newmarket training gallops Salse showed considerable promise but also appeared to be somewhat headstrong and hard to handle: he was therefore accompanied to the start by his trainer's assistant in his early races. The colt made his racecourse debut in a maiden race over six furlongs at Yarmouth in August and won by two and a half lengths from Persian Heights. In the Sancton Stakes over seven furlongs at York Racecourse in September Salse recorded an impressive victory as he drew away from his opponents in the closing stages and came home six lengths clear of Strike Force. The colt was then stepped up in class for the Somerville Tattersall Stakes at Newmarket Racecourse and after taking the lead approaching the final furlong he pulled clear to win very easily by four lengths from Rawnuk. On 24 October Salse started the 4/7 favourite for the Group 1 William Hill Futurity over one mile at Doncaster Racecourse but was beaten into third place behind Emmson and Sheriff's Star.

In the official International Classification of two-year-olds for 1987, Salse was given a rating of 116, nine pounds behind the top-rated pair Ravinella and Warning. The independent Timeform organisation rated him on 118, nine pounds inferior to Warning, who was their best two-year-old of the season.

=== 1988: three-year-old season ===
Salse had training problems in the early part of 1988 and did not reappear until the Royal Ascot meeting on 15 June when he started the 11/10 favourite for the Jersey Stakes and finished second of the twelve runners, a length behind the winner Indian Ridge. Ten days later at Newmarket he was beaten a short head by Cadeaux Genereux (to whom he was conceding two pounds in weight) in the Criterion Stakes. In the Bet With The Tote Trophy at Lingfield Park on 9 July he was narrowly beaten by Warning at level weights, but finished eight lengths clear of the other six runners. Sixteen days later Salse started 4/5 favourite for the Group 3 Beeswing Stakes over seven furlongs on soft ground at Newcastle Racecourse. Ridden by Steve Cauthen he took the lead approaching the last quarter mile and won by one and a half lengths from Always Fair. The Hungerford Stakes at Newbury Racecourse on 12 August saw a repeat of the Beeswing result, with Salse beating Always Fair in a field which also included Indian Ridge. The Park Stakes at Doncaster saw the colt matched against five opponents headed by the 1000 Guineas runner-up Dabaweyaa. With Cauthen in the saddle he led from the start and accelerated clear in the last quarter mile to win "comfortably" by three lengths.

On 24 September Salse faced Warning again when he was stepped up in class and distance to contest the Group 1 Queen Elizabeth II Stakes over one mile at Ascot. He took the lead in the straight but was unable to deal with the acceleration of his rival and was beaten into second, with Persian Heights, Soviet Star, Indian Ridge and Magic of Life finishing behind. In the Group 2 Challenge Stakes at Newmarket on 13 October the colt was ridden by Michael Roberts and started favourite ahead of seven opponents. He took the lead a furlong out and won by two and a half lengths from his stablemate Reprimand. On 23 October Salse was sent to France for the Group 1 Prix de la Forêt over 1400 metres at Longchamp Racecourse in which he was ridden by Willie Carson. His twelve opponents included Big Shuffle (Cork and Orrery Stakes), Bitooh (Critérium de Maisons-Laffitte), Blue Note (Prix Maurice de Gheest), Bon Vent (Prix du Palais-Royal), Fair Judgment (International Stakes), Gabina (Prix d'Astarte), Harmless Albatross (Prix des Chênes), In Extremis (Prix du Rond Point) and Raise A Memory (Prix Thomas Bryon). Salse turned into the straight in fifth place, took the lead 200 metres from the finish and wo by one and a half lengths from Gabina, with a further two and a half lengths back to Big Shuffle in third.

== Stud record ==
Salse was retired from racing to become a breeding stallion at the Side Hill Stud in Newmarket. Despite recording all of his biggest wins over distances short of a mile he proved surprisingly adept as a sire of stayers. The best of his offspring included Classic Cliche, Lemon Souffle, Air Express, Bianca Nera, Luso (Hong Kong Vase), Timboroa (Turf Classic), Sanmartino (Ebor Handicap) and Sausalito Bay (Supreme Novices' Hurdle). He was also the damsire of Rekindling.

Salse was euthanized on 13 June 2001 at the age of sixteen because of a "crumbling pedal bone".

== Pedigree ==
Pedigree of Salse, bay stallion, 1985
Sire Topsider (USA) 1974	Northern Dancer (CAN); 1961	Nearctic	Nearco (ITY)
Sire Topsider (USA) 1974	Northern Dancer (CAN); 1961	Nearctic	Lady Angela (GB)
Sire Topsider (USA) 1974	Northern Dancer (CAN); 1961	Natalma	Native Dancer
Sire Topsider (USA) 1974	Northern Dancer (CAN); 1961	Natalma	Almahmoud
Sire Topsider (USA) 1974	Drumtop; 1966	Round Table	Princequillo (IRE)
Sire Topsider (USA) 1974	Drumtop; 1966	Round Table	Knight's Daughter (GB)
Sire Topsider (USA) 1974	Drumtop; 1966	Zonah	Nasrullah (GB)
Sire Topsider (USA) 1974	Drumtop; 1966	Zonah	Gambetta
Dam Carnival Princess (USA) 1974	Prince John; 1953	Princequillo (IRE)	Prince Rose (GB)
Dam Carnival Princess (USA) 1974	Prince John; 1953	Princequillo (IRE)	Cosquilla (GB)
Dam Carnival Princess (USA) 1974	Prince John; 1953	Not Afraid	Count Fleet
Dam Carnival Princess (USA) 1974	Prince John; 1953	Not Afraid	Banish Fear
Dam Carnival Princess (USA) 1974	Carnival Queen; 1962	Amerigo (GB)	Nearco (ITY)
Dam Carnival Princess (USA) 1974	Carnival Queen; 1962	Amerigo (GB)	Sanlinea
Dam Carnival Princess (USA) 1974	Carnival Queen; 1962	Circus Ring	Bull Dog (FR)
Dam Carnival Princess (USA) 1974	Carnival Queen; 1962	Circus Ring	Arena (Family: 16-g)

- Salse was inbred 3 × 4 to Princequillo, meaning that this stallion appear in both the third and fourth generations of his pedigree. He was also inbred 4 × 4 to Nearco.
