= Postponed =

Irish-bred Thoroughbred racehorse

- Racing silks of Mohammed Obaid Al Maktoum
- Sire: Dubawi
- Grandsire: Dubai Millennium
- Dam: Ever Rigg
- Damsire: Dubai Destination
- Sex: Stallion
- Foaled: 4 April 2011
- Country: Ireland
- Colour: Bay
- Breeder: St Albans Bloodstock
- Owner: Mohammed Obaid Al Maktoum
- Trainer: Luca Cumani; Roger Varian
- Record: 20: 9-3-5
- Earnings: £4,995,979

Major wins
- Glasgow Stakes (2014); Great Voltigeur Stakes (2014); King George VI & Q. Elizabeth Stakes (2015); Prix Foy (2015); Dubai City of Gold (2016); Dubai Sheema Classic (2016); Coronation Cup (2016); International Stakes (2016)

Awards
- Top-rated British horse (2016)

Postponed (foaled 4 April 2011) is an Irish-bred, British-trained retired Thoroughbred racehorse and breeding stallion. He won one minor race as a two-year-old before establishing himself as a useful middle-distance performer in the following year with wins in the Glasgow Stakes and the Great Voltigeur Stakes. In July 2015, he recorded his biggest victory in the King George VI & Queen Elizabeth Stakes at Ascot Racecourse and followed up with a success in the Prix Foy. After a change of trainer he returned in 2016 to win the Dubai City of Gold, Dubai Sheema Classic, Coronation Cup and International Stakes. He was retired from racing in May 2017 having won 9 of his 20 races and earned nearly £5,000,000 in win and place prize money.

== Background ==
Postponed is a bay colt with no white markings bred in Ireland by St Albans Bloodstock. He was sired by Dubawi, a top-class son of Dubai Millennium, whose wins included the Irish 2,000 Guineas and the Prix Jacques Le Marois. At stud, Dubawi has been a highly successful breeding stallion, siring major winners such as Monterosso, Al Kazeem, Makfi, Lucky Nine and Night of Thunder. Postponed's dam Ever Rigg, won one minor race from five starts in 2008.

As a yearling in October 2012, Postponed was offered for sale at Tattersalls and sold for 360,000 guineas. He entered the ownership of Mohammed Obaid Al Maktoum (best known in racing circles as the owner of High-Rise) and was sent into training with Luca Cumani at Newmarket, Suffolk.

== Racing career ==
=== 2013: two-year-old season ===
On his racecourse debut, Postponed started a 50/1 outsider for a seven furlong maiden race at Newmarket Racecourse on 12 July 2013 and finished fifth of the ten runners behind True Story. In August the colt started odds-on favourite for a similar event at Great Yarmouth Racecourse in which he was ridden by Kirsty Milczarek. He took the lead approaching the final furlong and won by two and a half lengths from Epic Voyage. On his final appearance of the season he contested the Tattersalls Millions Trophy (restricted to two-year-olds sold at Tattersalls) at Newmarket and finished second of the sixteen runners, beaten 1 1/2 lengths by the Aidan O'Brien-trained Oklahoma City.

=== 2014: three-year-old season ===
On his first appearance as a three-year-old, Postponed contested the Group Three Craven Stakes (a trial race for the 2000 Guineas) over one mile at Newmarket. Ridden by Andrea Atzeni, he started at odds of 8/1 in a six-runner field and finished third behind Toormore and The Grey Gatsby. He was then moved up in distance for the Newmarket Stakes over ten furlongs on 3 May. He was made 15/8 joint-favourite but finished fourth behind the Richard Hannon Jr.-trained Barley Mow, after appearing to be outpaced in the closing stages. In June, Postponed was sent to Royal Ascot for the ten-furlong Tercentenary Stakes. After being restrained by Atzeni in the early stages he struggled to obtain a clear run in the straight before staying on to take third place behind Cannock Chase and Mutakayyef. A month later, Postponed was sent to Scotland for the Glasgow Stakes over eleven furlongs at Hamilton Park Racecourse and started 4/5 favourite against five opponents. He took the lead a quarter of the mile from the finish and accelerated away from the field to win by 3 1/2 lengths from Double Bluff.

On 20 August, Postponed started 5/2 favourite for the Great Voltigeur Stakes over 1 1/2 miles at York Racecourse. His opponents included Snow Sky (winner of the Lingfield Derby Trial and the Gordon Stakes), Hartnell (Queen's Vase) and the unbeaten Irish colt Granddukeoftuscany. After tracking the leaders, Postponed took the lead approaching the final furlong and stayed on well in the closing stages to win by 2 1/4 lengths from Snow Sky with a gap of eight lengths back to Odeon in third. After the race, Cumani said "He could be supplemented for the St Leger but my inclination would be to not stretch him that far. He's a mile-and-a-half horse." When interviewed three weeks later the trainer said "he's an exciting prospect for next year. My realistic hat says we should start off in the Jockey Club Stakes and take it from there, but when I put my dreaming hat on I think of the Coronation Cup, Eclipse and King George".

=== 2015: four-year-old season ===
Postponed began his third season in the Gordon Richards Stakes over ten furlongs at Sandown Park Racecourse on 24 April. Ridden for the first time by Adam Kirby he started the 15/8 favourite, but after leading for most of the way he was overtaken and beaten three quarters of a length by the John Gosden-trained Western Hymn. In May, the colt was sent to Ireland to contest the Tattersalls Gold Cup at the Curragh. He led the field until the last hundred yards but was then overtaken and was beaten a neck and a short head into third by Al Kazeem and Fascinating Rock, with The Grey Gatsby in fourth. At Royal Ascot in June he started 7/2 third favourite behind Telescope and Eagle Top (winner of the King Edward VII Stakes) in the Hardwicke Stakes over 1 1/2 miles. Kirby positioned the colt behind the front-running Snow Sky before moving into second place in the straight, but Postponed was unable to challenge the leader and was beaten almost four lengths, losing second place in the final strides to Eagle Top. John Gosden and Frankie Dettori, the trainer and jockey of Eagle Top, were highly critical of Kirby's tactics on Postponed. Dettori said "Kirby wanted my position and I wasn't going to give it up. We got into a bumping match and we set our horses alight. We didn't do each other any favours and we ruined our chances there and then". Gosden said "In the early part of the race [Kirby] had the reins short and the horse's head angled hard right, straight into our horse. That's not clean riding and it doesn’t belong anywhere in British racing".

On 25 July, Postponed was one of seven horses to contest the 65th running of Britain's most prestigious weight-for-age race, the King George VI and Queen Elizabeth Stakes over 1 1/2 miles at Ascot. Heavy rain on the day before the race led to soft ground which saw the withdrawal of several major contenders including Golden Horn and Flintshire. Snow Sky and Eagle Top were again in opposition, whilst the other runners were Clever Cookie (Ormonde Stakes), Madame Chiang (British Champions Fillies' and Mares' Stakes), Romsdal (third in the 2014 Epsom Derby) and the Italian challenger Dylan Mouth (Gran Premio del Jockey Club, Gran Premio di Milano). Postponed was ridden by Atzeni, whilst Dettori, who had been scheduled to ride Golden Horn, took the ride on Eagle Top. He started the 6/1 fourth choice in the betting behind Eagle Top, Snow Sky and Clever Cookie. After tracking the leader Romsdal, Postponed took the lead in the straight but Eagle Top, racing down the centre of the track mounted a strong late challenge. Eagle Top gained a slight lead in the final furlong, but Postponed rallied strongly to regain the lead in the last stride and won by a nose. Romsdal was 3 3/4 lengths back in third ahead of Madame Chiang and Snow Sky. It was a first win in the race for Cumani, who had trained two runners-up in Celestial Storm and High-Rise. The trainer commented "I’m very proud of both the horse and the jockey... it's the championship race of the summer and it's a defining moment in a horse's career and also in a trainer's and a jockey's career. We said all along that what happened in the Hardwicke was best forgotten and it wasn’t a true result. It was a slow-run race and the horses were not concentrating on the race but on beating each other up. Today was a clean-run race with a good pace given the ground, and we had the best horse, but all credit to Eagle Top too. I certainly wasn’t sure that we were in front when they passed the post".

On 13 September, Postponed prepared for a run in the Prix de l'Arc de Triomphe by contesting the Prix Foy over 2400 metres at Longchamp Racecourse. Ridden by Atzeni he started the 2.6/1 second favourite behind the Dubai Sheema Classic winner Dolniya in a field which also included Bathyron (Prix Vicomtesse Vigier), Baino Hope (Prix de Pomone), Free Port Lux (Prix Hocquart, Prix du Prince d'Orange) and Spiritjim (disqualified "winner" of the Grand Prix de Saint-Cloud). Atzeni tracked the pacemaker Roseburg before taking the lead 400 metres from the finish. Postponed stayed on well in the closing stages and prevailed by three quarters of a length from Spiritjim with Baino Hope taking third ahead of Dolniya. Three days later it was announced that all of Mohammed Obaid Al Maktoum's horses were to be removed from Cumani's stable and would be trained from then on by Roger Varian. No reason was given at the time. In 2016 however, the owner said "When I tell a trainer something he has to listen. I asked [Cumani] one thing – to get Postponed ready... He told me after running Postponed three times he's not ready and that's a problem... I am military. If I give someone an order he has to take my order... I won't take excuses".

=== 2016: five-year-old season ===
Postponed did not race for his new trainer until 6 March when he returned from a six-month absence to contest the Dubai City of Gold at Meydan Racecourse. Ridden by Atzeni, he was made the 11/10 favourite against five opponents headed by Dariyan, a French-trained four-year-old who had won the Prix Eugène Adam and been placed in both the Prix Guillaume d'Ornano and the Hong Kong Vase. After racing behind the leaders as the outsider Captain Morley set the pace, he took the lead a furlong from the finish and drew away to win by three lengths from Dariyan in a race record time of 2:27.90. Twenty days later, Postponed started 4/5 favourite for the Dubai Sheema Classic over the same course and distance. Dariyan was again in opposition whilst the other runners included Duramente, Highland Reel (Secretariat Stakes, Hong Kong Vase), Gailo Chop (Mackinnon Stakes), One and Only (Tokyo Yushun) and Sheikhzayedroad (Northern Dancer Turf Stakes). Ridden again by Atzeni, he raced in mid-division before taking the lead 300 metres from the finish and won by two lengths from Duramente in a record time of 2.26.97. After the race Varian commented "That was good to watch. He's a very good horse. He has thrived since he has come out here so all the credit has to go to my staff. We'll get him home and make a plan, though he will be contesting the main mile-and-a-half races in the summer".

On his return to Europe Postponed contested the Coronation Cup over 1 1/2 miles at Epsom and started odd-on favourite against seven opponents including the leading fillies Found, Simple Verse and Arabian Queen. After racing in third place behind his stablemate Roseburg and Arabian Queen he took the lead two furlongs out and drew away to win easily by 4 1/2 lengths from Found. After the race Atzeni commented "He's just a proper horse. He travelled great, goes on any ground and quickened up fantastically. He's a great horse to ride and I'm very lucky to ride him." Postponed was made a strong ante-post for the 2016 King George VI and Queen Elizabeth Stakes but contracted a respiratory infection and was withdrawn three days before the race. Postponed returned to the track on 17 August when he was dropped in distance for the International Stakes over 10 1/2 furlongs at York, He started the 15/8 favourite of eleven opponents including Hawkbill, Highland Reel, Wings of Desire, Mutakayyef (Summer Mile Stakes) and Dariyan. Atzeni tracked the leaders as the Varian stable's pacemaker King Bolete made the running before sending the favourite into the lead three furlongs out. Postponed held off the sustained challenge of Highland Reel to win by one and three quarter length despite drifting to the right in the closing stages.

On 2 October Postponed started the 2/1 favourite for the 2016 Prix de l'Arc de Triomphe over 2400 metres at Chantilly Racecourse. After tracking the leaders for most of the way he weakened in the straight and finished fifth of the sixteen runners behind Found. Roger Varian said "he was trapped three wide early on and couldn’t get in. It meant he met the big bend on the wrong lead and then he didn’t quicken up like he can. It's disappointing as we went in hoping we would win, but the main thing is we still have a horse to go to war with".

=== 2017: six-year-old season ===
Postponed remained in training as a six-year-old and ran twice at Meydan Racecourse in March 2017, contesting the same two races there as he had in 2016. On 2 March he ran in the Dubai City of Gold and was beaten into second place by a neck by Prize Money, and 25 March he placed third in the Dubai Sheema Classic behind Jack Hobbs. He subsequently suffered a stress fracture to a leg and was retired from racing in May 2017.

== Assessment ==
In the 2015 edition of the World's Best Racehorse Rankings Postponed was given a rating of 121 making him the second best British older male and the twenty-seventh best racehorse in the world.

In the 2016 edition of the World's Best Racehorse Rankings Postponed was given a rating of 124, making him the 8th best racehorse in the world and the top-rated horse in Britain.

== Stud career ==
Postponed moved to Yorton Stud near Welshpool for the 2024 breeding season after Yorton and James & Jean Potter, Ltd. purchased the stallion who previously stood under the Darley banner at Dalham Hall Stud in Newmarket.

== Pedigree ==
Pedigree of Postponed (IRE), bay horse, 2011
Sire Dubawi (IRE) 2002	Dubai Millennium (GB); 1996	Seeking the Gold	Mr. Prospector
Sire Dubawi (IRE) 2002	Dubai Millennium (GB); 1996	Seeking the Gold	Con Game
Sire Dubawi (IRE) 2002	Dubai Millennium (GB); 1996	Colorado Dancer	Shareef Dancer
Sire Dubawi (IRE) 2002	Dubai Millennium (GB); 1996	Colorado Dancer	Fall Aspen
Sire Dubawi (IRE) 2002	Zomaradah (GB); 1995	Deploy	Shirley Heights
Sire Dubawi (IRE) 2002	Zomaradah (GB); 1995	Deploy	Slightly Dangerous
Sire Dubawi (IRE) 2002	Zomaradah (GB); 1995	Jawaher	Dancing Brave
Sire Dubawi (IRE) 2002	Zomaradah (GB); 1995	Jawaher	High Tern
Dam Ever Rigg (GB) 2005	Dubai Destination (USA); 1999	Kingmambo	Mr. Prospector
Dam Ever Rigg (GB) 2005	Dubai Destination (USA); 1999	Kingmambo	Miesque
Dam Ever Rigg (GB) 2005	Dubai Destination (USA); 1999	Mysterial	Alleged
Dam Ever Rigg (GB) 2005	Dubai Destination (USA); 1999	Mysterial	Mysteries
Dam Ever Rigg (GB) 2005	Bianca Nera (GB); 1994	Salse	Topsider
Dam Ever Rigg (GB) 2005	Bianca Nera (GB); 1994	Salse	Carnival Princess
Dam Ever Rigg (GB) 2005	Bianca Nera (GB); 1994	Birch Creek	Carwhite
Dam Ever Rigg (GB) 2005	Bianca Nera (GB); 1994	Birch Creek	Deed (Family: 14-c)

- Postponed is inbred 4 × 4 to Mr. Prospector, meaning that this stallion appears twice in the fourth generation of his pedigree.
