= Churchill (horse) =

Irish-bred Thoroughbred racehorse

- Racing silks of Michael Tabor
- Sire: Galileo
- Grandsire: Sadler's Wells
- Dam: Meow
- Damsire: Storm Cat
- Sex: Colt
- Foaled: 31 January 2014
- Country: Ireland
- Colour: Bay
- Breeder: Liberty Bloodstock
- Owner: Michael Tabor, Derrick Smith & Sue Magnier
- Trainer: Aidan O'Brien
- Record: 13: 7-1-2
- Earnings: $1,847,877

Major wins
- Chesham Stakes (2016); Tyros Stakes (2016); Futurity Stakes (2016); National Stakes (2016); Dewhurst Stakes (2016); 2000 Guineas (2017); Irish 2,000 Guineas (2017)

Awards
- Cartier Champion Two-year-old Colt (2016); Top-rated European two-year-old (2016)

Churchill (foaled 31 January 2014) is an Irish Thoroughbred racehorse. He was rated the best two-year-old colt in Europe in 2016, winning five of his six races including the Chesham Stakes, Tyros Stakes, Futurity Stakes, National Stakes and Dewhurst Stakes. On his three-year-old debut he won the 2000 Guineas and followed up with a second Classic victory in the Irish 2,000 Guineas.

== Background ==
Churchill is a bay colt with a white star and three white socks bred in Ireland by Liberty Bloodstock, a breeding company associated with the Coolmore Stud organisation.

He was sired by Galileo, who won the Derby, Irish Derby and King George VI and Queen Elizabeth Stakes in 2001. Galileo is now one of the world's leading stallions and has been champion sire of Great Britain and Ireland eight times so far. His other progeny include Cape Blanco, Frankel, Golden Lilac, Nathaniel, New Approach, Rip Van Winkle, Found, Minding and Ruler of the World. Churchill's dam Meow showed good form as a juvenile in 2010, finishing second in the Queen Mary Stakes and winning the Listed Grangecon Stud Stakes. Meow was a daughter of the outstanding filly Airwave and closely related to the leading sprinter Jwala.

The colt was sent into training with Aidan O'Brien at Ballydoyle. Like many Coolmore horses, the official details of his ownership have changed from race to race: he has sometimes been listed as being the property of Susan Magnier, while on other occasions he has been described as being owned by a partnership of Derrick Smith, Michael Tabor and Susan Magnier.

== Racing career ==
=== 2016: two-year-old season ===
==== Spring ====
Churchill made his racecourse debut in a six-furlong maiden race at the Curragh on 22 May in which he was ridden by Ryan Moore and started the 2/1 favourite in an eleven-runner field. After racing in mid-division he stayed on in the closing stages to finish third behind Van Der Decken and Magnification.

==== Summer ====
In June he was moved up in class and distance when he was sent to England to contest the Listed Chesham Stakes over seven furlongs at Royal Ascot. Starting the 8/11 favourite against twelve opponents he took the lead two furlongs out and won by half a length from Isomer despite drifting to the left in the closing stages. In July Churchill was moved up to Group Three class for the Tyros Stakes over seven furlongs at Leopardstown Racecourse. He was sent off the 2/5 favourite, but after taking the lead a furlong out he was "strongly pressed" before prevailing by a neck from Alexios Komnenos.

Only three horses appeared to oppose Churchill when the colt started at odds of 1/4 for the Group Two Futurity Stakes over seven furlongs at the Curragh on 21 August. Ridden by Seamie Heffernan he took the lead inside the final furlong and drew away in the closing stages to win by two lengths from the Jim Bolger-trained Radio Silence. After the race O'Brien commented "He's lazy and doesn't do a lot when he gets to the front, but he quickened nicely to get there. He'll come back here for the National Stakes next month. We think he's a Guineas horse and that he'll get further than a mile. He might get a mile and a half but the way he works you wouldn't be sure about that at this stage".

==== Autumn ====
On 11 September, over the same course and distance, Churchill started the odds-on favourite for Ireland's most prestigious race for juveniles, the Group One Vincent O'Brien National Stakes. The best of his six rivals appeared to be the British-trained Mehmas (ridden by Frankie Dettori), whose wins included the July Stakes and Richmond Stakes. Ridden by Moore, Churchill briefly struggled to obtain a clear run before taking the lead in the final furlong and then drawing away to win "comfortably" by 4 1/4 lengths from Mehmas. O'Brien said "He's a very exciting horse. He settled and he quickened and I thought that he went like a real miler, but Ryan was adamant that a mile and a quarter would be no problem to him next year either. He can be idle when he hits the front so it was lovely when Frankie's horse eyeballed him and kind of leaned into him up the run in because that's exactly what he wanted. He would have learned a lot today".

Churchill was then sent to England for the Dewhurst Stakes at Newmarket Racecourse on 8 October. With Moore again in the saddle he was made the 8/11 favourite against six opponents including South Seas (winner of the Solario Stakes), Blue Point and Rivet. The O'Brien stable's pacemaker Lancaster Bomber took the lead from the start with Churchill restrained in mid-division. After briefly struggling to obtain a clear run the favourite took the lead inside the final furlong and won by 1 1/4 lengths from Lancaster Bomber with Blue Point in third place and Thunder Snow in fourth.

=== 2017: three-year-old season ===
Churchill was favourite for both the 2000 Guineas and the Epsom Derby throughout the winter of 2016/7 and the spring of 2017. Rather than run in any of the recognised trial races, Churchill made his debut as a three-year-old in the 2000 Guineas on 6 May at Newmarket, in which he was accompanied by his stablemates Lancaster Bomber and Spirit of Valor. He was made favourite ahead of nine opponents headed by Barney Roy (Greenham Stakes), Al Wukair (Prix Djebel) and Eminent (Craven Stakes). After tracking the leaders he took the lead approaching the final furlong and won by a length from Barney Roy with Al Wukair and Lancaster Bomber close behind in third and fourth. After the race Moore commented "He has a magnificent mind, he travels, has speed and loads of class. He was always racing comfortably – he was there a little bit early. He always feels like there's more when you ask him", whilst O'Brien, who was winning the race for a record eighth time said "I was very worried about it being his first run. He's a big horse and we knew he would come on for the run. Ryan gave him a lovely ride. Everyone at home was very happy with the horse which is why we took the chance to come first time, so I'm delighted".

Three weeks after his win at Newmarket, Churchill started 4/9 favourite for the Irish 2000 Guineas at the Curragh. Thunder Snow and Lancaster Bomber were again in opposition while the best of the other four runners appeared to be the previously undefeated Irishcorrespondent. Lancaster Bomber set the pace with Churchill settled towards the rear of the field before moving up on the outside in the straight. He took the lead from Thunder Snow approaching the final furlong and drew away in the closing stages to win by 2 1/2 lengths. Ryan Moore commented "He wasn't enjoying the ground so I tried to help him along, but when I asked him he was there".

At Royal Ascot on 20 June Churchill started odds-on favourite as he attempted to extend his winning run in the St James's Palace Stakes. He was restrained in the early stages as Lancaster Bomber set a steady pace but was unable to make any significant progress in the straight and finished fourth behind Barney Roy, Lancaster Bomber and Thunder Snow. After a break of more than two months, Churchill returned for the International Stakes at York Racecourse in which he was matched against older horses and moved up in distance to 10 1/2 furlongs. He was made the 5/2 favourite and raced in third place before making progress in the straight but was beaten two lengths into second place by the four-year-old Ulysses.

== Stud career ==
Churchill retired to Coolmore Stud at the end of his 2017 season. Standing for an initial fee of €35,000, this dropped to €30,000 from 2020 and then to his current fee of €25,000 for 2022. Since 2018 Churchill has also shuttled to Coolmore Australia. From his first crop of two-year-olds in 2021 he produced five black type winners. In 2022 Churchill had his first Group 1 winner as a sire after Vadeni won the Prix du Jockey Club.

=== Notable progeny ===
c = colt, f = filly, g = gelding

Foaled	Name	Sex	Major wins
2019	Vadeni	c	Prix du Jockey Club, Eclipse Stakes
2020	Blue Rose Cen	f	Prix Marcel Boussac, Poule d'Essai des Pouliches, Prix de Diane, Prix de l'Opéra
2021	Survie	m	Christophe Clement Turf Stakes

== Assessment and awards ==
On 8 November 2016 Churchill was named Champion two-year-old colt at the Cartier Racing Awards. In the official European Classification of two-year-olds for 2016 Churchill was given a rating of 122, making him the best juvenile of the season, one pound ahead of the filly Lady Aurelia and four pounds ahead of the colts Thunder Snow and National Defense.

In the 2017 World's Best Racehorse Rankings, Churchill was rated the twelfth-best horse in the world and the joint-best horse in Ireland.

== Pedigree ==
Pedigree of Churchill (IRE), bay colt, 2014
Sire Galileo (IRE) 1998	Sadler's Wells (USA); 1981	Northern Dancer	Nearctic
Sire Galileo (IRE) 1998	Sadler's Wells (USA); 1981	Northern Dancer	Natalma
Sire Galileo (IRE) 1998	Sadler's Wells (USA); 1981	Fairy Bridge	Bold Reason
Sire Galileo (IRE) 1998	Sadler's Wells (USA); 1981	Fairy Bridge	Special
Sire Galileo (IRE) 1998	Urban Sea (USA) ch. 1989	Miswaki	Mr. Prospector
Sire Galileo (IRE) 1998	Urban Sea (USA) ch. 1989	Miswaki	Hopespringseternal
Sire Galileo (IRE) 1998	Urban Sea (USA) ch. 1989	Allegretta	Lombard
Sire Galileo (IRE) 1998	Urban Sea (USA) ch. 1989	Allegretta	Anatevka
Dam Meow (IRE) 2008	Storm Cat (USA); 1983	Storm Bird	Northern Dancer
Dam Meow (IRE) 2008	Storm Cat (USA); 1983	Storm Bird	South Ocean
Dam Meow (IRE) 2008	Storm Cat (USA); 1983	Terlingua	Secretariat
Dam Meow (IRE) 2008	Storm Cat (USA); 1983	Terlingua	Crimson Saint
Dam Meow (IRE) 2008	Airwave (GB); 2000	Air Express	Salse
Dam Meow (IRE) 2008	Airwave (GB); 2000	Air Express	Ibtisamm
Dam Meow (IRE) 2008	Airwave (GB); 2000	Kangra Valley	Indian Ridge
Dam Meow (IRE) 2008	Airwave (GB); 2000	Kangra Valley	Thorner Lane (Family 19-a)

- Churchill is inbred 3 × 4 to Northern Dancer, meaning that this stallion appears in both the third and fourth generations of his pedigree.
