= Emmson =

Irish-bred Thoroughbred racehorse

- Sire: Ela-Mana-Mou
- Grandsire: Pitcairn
- Dam: Happy Kin
- Damsire: Bold Hitter
- Sex: Stallion
- Foaled: 11 February 1985
- Country: Ireland
- Colour: Bay
- Breeder: Ballymacoll Stud
- Owner: Michael Sobell; Arnold Weinstock
- Trainer: Dick Hern
- Record: 16: 5-1-2

Major wins
- Washington Singer Stakes (1987); William Hill Futurity (1987); Prix Gontaut-Biron (1989)

Awards
- Timeform rating 123 (1987)

Emmson (11 February 1985 – after 1996) was an Irish-bred British-trained Thoroughbred racehorse and sire. He was one of the best staying two-year-olds in Britain in 1987 when he won four of his five races including the Washington Singer Stakes and the William Hill Futurity. He failed to win as a three-year-old but did finish third in the Prix du Jockey Club and ran prominently in the Prix de l'Arc de Triomphe. He remained in training for two more seasons, recording his only subsequent win in the 1989 Prix Gontaut-Biron. After his retirement from racing he had some success as a sire of winners in Brazil.

== Background ==
Emmson was a bay horse with no white markings bred in Ireland by the Ballymacoll Stud. He was sired by Ela-Mana-Mou an outstanding middle distance performer whose wins included the Eclipse Stakes and the King George VI and Queen Elizabeth Stakes in 1980. His other progeny included Double Trigger, Snurge and Almaarad. Emmson's dam Happy Kin won three races from thirty-three starts in North America between 1977 and 1980. She was descended from Great Niece, a full-sister to Great Nephew and the female-line ancestor of many major winners including Swain.

Emmson raced in the colours of Ballymacoll's owners Michael Sobell and Arnold Weinstock. He was trained by Dick Hern at West Ilsley in Berkshire.

== Racing career ==
=== 1987: two-year-old season ===
On what was scheduled to be his racecourse debut, Emmson was withdrawn at the start of a race at Salisbury after his jockey reported him to be "wrong behind". Five days later he appeared to be completely sound when winning a maiden race over seven furlongs at Newbury Racecourse. In July, over the same course and distance, he won the Donnington Castle Stakes, beating the John Dunlop-trained favourite Alwuhush by three quarters of a length. The Washington Singer Stakes in August, again over seven furlongs at Newbury, saw the colt moving up in class and winning by three quarters of a length from Zelphi. He was then stepped up in class and distance for the Group Two Royal Lodge Stakes over one mile at Ascot Racecourse in September and started the 13/2 fourth choice in the betting. Ridden as usual by Willie Carson he was slightly hampered in the straight before staying on to finish fourth behind Sanquirico, Undercut and Alwuhush.

On 24 October Emmson was one of six colts to contest the Group One William Hill Futurity. He was made the 7/1 third favourite behind the undefeated Salse (winner of the Somerville Tattersall Stakes) and Alwuhush, with the best fancied of the other three runners being Sheriff's Star. After racing in third place behind the outsiders Top Class and Ilishpour he moved to the front two furlongs out and held off the late challenge of Sheriff's Star, with Salse two lengths back in third.

=== 1988: three-year-old season ===
Emmson began his second season in the Dante Stakes (a major trial race for The Derby) over ten and a half furlongs at York Racecourse in May. He led for most of the way but was overtaken in the last quarter mile and finished fourth of the seven runners behind Red Glow. He bypassed the Derby in favour of the Prix du Jockey Club at Chantilly Racecourse and finished third beaten a short head and three quarters of a length by Hours After and Ghost Buster's. After a lengthy break he returned to France in October for the Prix de l'Arc de Triomphe at Longchamp Racecourse. Ridden by Tony Ives he took the lead approaching the straight and maintained his advantage until 200 metres from the finish, but then faded quickly and finished eighth of the twenty-four runners behind Tony Bin. On his fourth and final appearance of the year he was dropped in class and started odds-on favourite for the Group Three St Simon Stakes at Newbury but ran poorly and finished seventh, more than twenty lengths behind the winner Upend.

=== 1989: four-year-old season ===
Emmson made his first appearance in the Gordon Richards Stakes at Sandown Park Racecourse on 29 April and finished a remote sixth behind Indian Skimmer. In the Hardwicke Stakes at Royal Ascot in June he led until the final quarter mile before finishing third behind Assatis and Top Class. He was then dropped to Listed class for the Fred Archer Stakes at Newmarket Racecourse on 1 July and finished second to the four-year-old Apache. On 12 August the colt made his third appearance in France when he contested the Group Three Prix Gontaut-Biron over 2000 metres at Deauville Racecourse. With Carson in the saddle, he tracked the leader Hello Calder before taking the lead in the last 200 metres and stayed on well to win by three quarters of a length from Sweet Chesne. Carson received a four-day ban (later overturned) for causing interference but the result was allowed to stand.

=== 1990: five-year-old season ===
Emmson remained in training as a five-year-old and was ridden in all three of his races by Alain Lequeux. He failed to recover his best form, finishing fifth in the Prix d'Harcourt, last of ten in the Prix Ganay and eighth in La Coupe in his final race on 23 June.

== Assessment ==
In the official International Classification of two-year-olds for 1987, Emmson was given a rating of 118, seven pounds behind the top-rated pair Ravinella and Warning, making him the fifth best British juvenile colt. The independent Timeform organisation rated him on 123, four pounds inferior to Warning, who was their best two-year-old of the season. In their annual Racehorses of 1987 Timeform described him as a "very genuine" stayer who was likely to develop into a St Leger contender.

== Stud record ==
At the end of his racing career, Emmson was exported to become a breeding stallion in Brazil. His last foals were born in 1997. His best runners included the filly Verruma and the colt Mr Pleasentfar, both of whom won Grade One races in Brazil before transferring to the United States: Verruma won the Athenia Stakes whilst Mr Pleasentfar won the Red Smith Handicap.

== Pedigree ==
Pedigree of Emmson (IRE), bay stallion, 1985
Sire Ela-Mana-Mou (IRE) 1976	Pitcairn (IRE); 1971	Petingo	Petition
Sire Ela-Mana-Mou (IRE) 1976	Pitcairn (IRE); 1971	Petingo	Alcazar
Sire Ela-Mana-Mou (IRE) 1976	Pitcairn (IRE); 1971	Border Bounty	Bounteous
Sire Ela-Mana-Mou (IRE) 1976	Pitcairn (IRE); 1971	Border Bounty	B Flat
Sire Ela-Mana-Mou (IRE) 1976	Rose Bertin (GB); 1970	High Hat	Hyperion
Sire Ela-Mana-Mou (IRE) 1976	Rose Bertin (GB); 1970	High Hat	Madonna
Sire Ela-Mana-Mou (IRE) 1976	Rose Bertin (GB); 1970	Wide Awake	Major Portion
Sire Ela-Mana-Mou (IRE) 1976	Rose Bertin (GB); 1970	Wide Awake	Wake Island
Dam Happy Kin (USA) 1975	Bold Hitter (USA); 1966	Bold Ruler	Nasrullah
Dam Happy Kin (USA) 1975	Bold Hitter (USA); 1966	Bold Ruler	Miss Disco
Dam Happy Kin (USA) 1975	Bold Hitter (USA); 1966	Batter Up	Tom Fool
Dam Happy Kin (USA) 1975	Bold Hitter (USA); 1966	Batter Up	Striking
Dam Happy Kin (USA) 1975	Gay Niece (USA); 1968	Sir Gaylord	Turn-To
Dam Happy Kin (USA) 1975	Gay Niece (USA); 1968	Sir Gaylord	Somethingroyal
Dam Happy Kin (USA) 1975	Gay Niece (USA); 1968	Great Niece	Honeyway
Dam Happy Kin (USA) 1975	Gay Niece (USA); 1968	Great Niece	Sybil's Niece (Family:14-c)
