= Classic Cliche =

Irish-bred Thoroughbred racehorse

- Racing colours of Godolphin
- Sire: Salse
- Grandsire: Topsider
- Dam: Pato
- Damsire: High Top
- Sex: Stallion
- Foaled: 13 March 1992
- Country: Ireland
- Colour: Bay
- Breeder: Victor Matthews
- Owner: Ivan Allan; Godolphin
- Trainer: Henry Cecil; Saeed bin Suroor
- Record: 16: 6-5-0
- Earnings: £678,705

Major wins
- Dante Stakes (1995); St. Leger Stakes (1995); Yorkshire Cup (1996); Ascot Gold Cup (1996); Prix Kergorlay (1997)

Classic Cliche (13 March 1992 – 25 August 2016), was a Thoroughbred racehorse and active sire who was bred in Ireland and trained in Britain and the United Arab Emirates. In a career which lasted from August 1994 until September 1997, he ran sixteen times and won six races. He recorded his most important success when winning the Classic St. Leger Stakes as a three-year-old in 1995, the same year in which he won the Dante Stakes. In the following season he became the first Classic winner in fifty years to win the Ascot Gold Cup.

== Background ==
Classic Cliche was a bay horse with a white star sired by the Prix de la Forêt winner Salse, whose progeny also included the Queen Elizabeth II Stakes winner Air Express and the Turf Classic Invitational Stakes winner Timboroa. Classic Cliche's dam Pato also produced the Yorkshire Oaks winner My Emma and was a member of the same Thoroughbred family which produced The Derby winners Blakeney and Morston. Classic Cliche was consigned by the Nidd Park Stud to the Tattersalls sales as a foal in November 1992 where he was sold for 13,500 guineas by N. Magill. In October 1993 the yearling was sent to the Goffs sales in Ireland and was bought for IR£85,000 by the Malaysian businessman Ivan Allan. Allan sent the colt into training with Henry Cecil at Warren Place stables at Newmarket.

== Racing career ==
=== 1994: two-year-old season ===
Classic Cliche made his racecourse debut in a seven furlong maiden race at Newmarket on 26 August. Ridden by Pat Eddery he started 6/5 favourite and "held on well" in the closing stages to win by a head from Okavango. A month later, he started favourite for a minor stakes race at Ascot in which he was beaten a short head by Wijara, with the future multiple Group One winner Luso finishing fourth. At the end of the year, Classic Cliche was sold to Sheikh Mohammed's Godolphin organisation and transferred to the stable of Saeed bin Suroor.

=== 1995: three-year-old season ===
Classic Cliche made his first appearance for Godolphin in the Dante Stakes at York, a recognised trial for The Derby. Ridden by Walter Swinburn he took the lead two furlongs from the finish and stayed on gamely in the straight to win by half a length from Annus Mirabilis, with the favourite Presenting four lengths back in third.

Classic Cliche ran next in the Prix du Jockey Club at Chantilly on 4 June. He stayed on in the closing stages to finish fourth behind Celtic Swing, Poliglote and Winged Love. Six days later Presenting was beaten less than two lengths by Lammtarra in the Epsom Derby. On 2 July Classic Cliche finished fifth behind Winged Love in the Irish Derby.

After a break of two months, Classic Cliche reappeared in the St. Leger at Doncaster for which he started 100/30 favourite. Dettori tracked the leader, Jural, before moving into the lead four furlongs from the finish. Classic Cliche quickly went clear of the field and won by three and a half lengths from Minds Music. The win gave Dettori the 1,000th win of his career.

=== 1996: four-year-old season ===
As a four-year-old, Classic Cliche was campaigned over extended distances. On his seasonal debut, he was pitted against the Irish St. Leger winner Strategic Choice and the Gran Premio del Jockey Club winner Court of Honour in the Yorkshire Cup at York. Ridden by Mick Kinane, Classic Cliche took the lead in the straight and stayed on strongly to beat Strategic Choice by one and a half lengths.

Classic Cliche was then moved up in distance and class to contest the two and a half mile Gold Cup at Royal Ascot in June, a race which no Classic winner had won since Ocean Swell in 1945. The Godolphin colt started 3/1 second choice in the betting behind the 1/2 favourite Double Trigger. Mick Kinane restrained Classic Cliche for much of the race before moving him up to challenge in the straight. Classic Cliche took the lead in the closing stages and was driven out by Kinane to win from Double Trigger and Nononito. A month later, Classic Cliche returned to Ascot for Britain's most prestigious all-aged race, the King George VI and Queen Elizabeth Stakes over one and a half miles. He was always prominent and took the lead in the straight but was overtaken by Pentire and finished second, beaten one and three quarter lengths, a neck ahead of the Derby winner Shaamit.

On his final appearance of the year, Classic Cliche was sent to Longchamp for the Prix de l'Arc de Triomphe. He made little impression, and was eased down by Frankie Dettori in the straight, finishing fifteenth of the sixteen runners behind Helissio.

=== 1997: five-year-old season ===
On his five-year-old debut, Classic Cliche attempted to win the Yorkshire Cup for the second successive year, but ran unaccountably badly, finishing last of the nine runners behind Celeric.

In the Ascot Gold Cup, Classic Cliche faced an exceptionally strong field which included Celeric, Double Trigger, Nononito, Moonax and Persian Punch. Ridden by Dettori, he was held up in the closing stages before moving up to take the lead in the straight. Inside the final furlong he was overtaken by Celeric and finished second, beaten three quarters of a length. In July, Classic Cliche started favourite for the Goodwood Cup, but was beaten one and a half lengths by Double Trigger. On 24 August, Classic Cliche was sent to France to contest the Prix Kergorlay at Deauville, in which he was ridden by John Reid. Starting the 7/10 favourite, he took the lead in the straight and won by two lengths from Orchestra Stall.

Classic Cliche's final race was the Irish St. Leger at the Curragh in September. He started 2/1 joint favourite but was never a threat and finished tailed-off last of the seven runners behind Oscar Schindler.

== Stud career ==
Classic Cliche stood at the Wood Farm stud in Shropshire before moving to the Kilbarry Lodge Stud in Ireland. Died on 25 August 2016 His best flat racing performer was the filly Macadamia who won the Falmouth Stakes in 2003 He is currently marketed as a National Hunt sire.

== Pedigree ==
Pedigree of Classic Cliche (GB), bay stallion, 1992
| Sire Salse (USA) 1985 | Topsider (USA); 1974 | Northern Dancer | Nearctic |
| Sire Salse (USA) 1985 | Topsider (USA); 1974 | Northern Dancer | Natalma |
| Sire Salse (USA) 1985 | Topsider (USA); 1974 | Drumtop | Round Table |
| Sire Salse (USA) 1985 | Topsider (USA); 1974 | Drumtop | Zonah |
| Sire Salse (USA) 1985 | Carnival Princess (USA); 1974 | Prince John | Princequillo |
| Sire Salse (USA) 1985 | Carnival Princess (USA); 1974 | Prince John | Not Afraid |
| Sire Salse (USA) 1985 | Carnival Princess (USA); 1974 | Carnival Queen | Amerigo |
| Sire Salse (USA) 1985 | Carnival Princess (USA); 1974 | Carnival Queen | Circus Ring |
| Dam Pato (GB) 1982 | High Top (IRE); 1969 | Derring-Do | Darius |
| Dam Pato (GB) 1982 | High Top (IRE); 1969 | Derring-Do | Sipsey Bridge |
| Dam Pato (GB) 1982 | High Top (IRE); 1969 | Camenae | Vimy |
| Dam Pato (GB) 1982 | High Top (IRE); 1969 | Camenae | Madrilene |
| Dam Pato (GB) 1982 | Patosky (GB); 1969 | Skymaster | Golden Cloud |
| Dam Pato (GB) 1982 | Patosky (GB); 1969 | Skymaster | Discipliner |
| Dam Pato (GB) 1982 | Patosky (GB); 1969 | Los Patos | Ballymoss |
| Dam Pato (GB) 1982 | Patosky (GB); 1969 | Los Patos | Patagonia (Family:20-c) |
