= Ridgewood Pearl Stakes =

Flat horse race in Ireland

Ridgewood Pearl Stakes (Lanwades Stud Stakes)
- Class: Group 2
- Location: Curragh Racecourse; County Kildare, Ireland
- Inaugurated: 2004
- Race type: Flat / Thoroughbred
- Sponsor: Lanwades Stud
- Website: Curragh

Race information
- Distance: 1 mile (1,609 metres)
- Surface: Turf
- Track: Right-handed
- Qualification: Four-years-old and up fillies & mares
- Weight: 9 st 2 lb Penalties; 3 lb for G1 winners* * since 1 September last year
- Purse: €112,800 (2022); 1st: €70,800

Ridgewood Pearl Stakes
2026
City Of Memphis	Carolina Jetstream	Stateira

Previous years
2025
Porta Fortuna	One Look	Naomi Lapaglia
2024
Ocean Jewel	Goldana	Rogue Millennium
2023
Just Beautiful	Jumbly	Insinuendo
2022
Pearls Galore	Emphatic Answer	Sh Boom
2021
Epona Plays	Soul Search	Too Soon To Panic

2020-2011
2020
Magic Wand	Hamariyna	Silk Forest
2019
Beshaayir	I Can Fly	Red Tea
2018
Opal Tiara	Hydrangea	Making Light
2017
Creggs Pipes	Opal Tiara	Turret Rocks
2016
Devonshire	Irish Rookie	Hint of A Tint
2015
Brooch	Ramone	Amazing Maria
2014
Purr Along	Fiesolana	Princess Loulou
2013
Chigun	La Collina	Lily's Angel
2012
Emulous	One Spirit	Alanza
2011
Emulous	Lolly For Dolly	Kinky Afro

2010-2004
2010
Shamwari Lodge	Indiana Gal	Annabelle's Charm
2009
Emily Blake	Beach Bunny	Deauville Vision
2008
Grecian Dancer	Mooretown Lady	Cheyenne Star
2007
Cheyenne Star	Heaven Sent	Modeeroch
2006
Pout	Jazz Princess	Royal Alchemist
2005
Airwave	Miss Trish	Kinnaird
2004
Soviet Song	Livadiya	Hanami

The Ridgewood Pearl Stakes, also known as the Lanwades Stud Stakes, is a Group 2 flat horse race in Ireland open to thoroughbred fillies and mares aged four years or older. It is run at the Curragh over a distance of 1 mile (1,609 metres), and it is scheduled to take place each year in May.

The event's registered title honours Ridgewood Pearl, a successful Irish-trained filly in the mid 1990s. Ridgewood Pearl died in 2003, and the title was first used for that year's running of a race now called the Renaissance Stakes. The present Ridgewood Pearl Stakes was established in 2004, and it initially held Group 2 status. It was downgraded to Group 3 level in 2007 and returned to Group 2 status in 2015.

The race was sponsored by TRI Equestrian from 2009 to 2012, and was referred to as the TRI Equestrian Stakes. In 2013 it was renamed the Abu Dhabi Stakes and in 2014 the sponsorship was taken over by Lanwades Stud. It is held on the same afternoon as the Irish 2,000 Guineas.

== Records ==
Most successful horse (2 wins):

- Emulous - 2011, 2012

Leading jockey (6 wins):

- Billy Lee - Devonshire (2016), Epona Plays (2021), Pearls Galore (2022), Just Beautiful (2023), Ocean Jewel (2024), City Of Memphis (2026)

Leading trainer (3 wins):

- Dermot Weld - Emulous (2011, 2012), Brooch (2015)
- Willie McCreery - Devonshire (2016), Epona Plays (2021), Ocean Jewel (2024)
- Paddy Twomey - Pearls Galore (2022), Just Beautiful (2023), City Of Memphis (2026)

== Winners ==
Year	Winner	Age	Jockey	Trainer	Time
2004	Soviet Song	4	Johnny Murtagh	James Fanshawe	1:39.50
2005	Airwave	5	Kieren Fallon	Aidan O'Brien	1:41.60
2006	Pout	4	Danny Grant	John Joseph Murphy	1:52.10
2007	Cheyenne Star	4	Pat Smullen	Frances Crowley	1:38.70
2008	Grecian Dancer	5	Fran Berry	Charles O'Brien	1:39.69
2009	Emily Blake	5	Johnny Murtagh	John Hayden	1:47.61
2010	Shamwari Lodge	4	Richard Hughes	Richard Hannon Sr.	1:41.35
2011	Emulous	4	Pat Smullen	Dermot Weld	1:38.95
2012	Emulous	5	Pat Smullen	Dermot Weld	1:41.20
2013	Chigun	4	Tom Queally	Sir Henry Cecil	1:37.78
2014	Purr Along	4	Jamie Spencer	Johnny Murtagh	1:47.55
2015	Brooch	4	Pat Smullen	Dermot Weld	1:39.65
2016	Devonshire	4	Billy Lee	Willie McCreery	1:46.20
2017	Creggs Pipes	5	Declan McDonogh	Andrew Slattery	1:41.16
2018	Opal Tiara	5	Ronan Whelan	Mick Channon	1:39.24
2019	Beshaayir	4	Frankie Dettori	William Haggas	1:37.06
2020	Magic Wand (Note: The 2020 race was run in June due to the COVID-19 pandemic in the Republic of Ireland)	5	Seamie Heffernan	Aidan O'Brien	1:38.17
2021	Epona Plays	4	Billy Lee	Willie McCreery	1:42.56
2022	Pearls Galore	5	Billy Lee	Paddy Twomey	1:39.62
2023	Just Beautiful	5	Billy Lee	Paddy Twomey	1:39.61
2024	Ocean Jewel	4	Billy Lee	Willie McCreery	1:40.93
2025	Porta Fortuna	4	Ryan Moore	Donnacha O'Brien	1:35.11
2026	City Of Memphis	4	Billy Lee	Paddy Twomey	1:36.51

== See also ==
- Horse racing in Ireland
- List of Irish flat horse races
