= Firth of Clyde Stakes =

Flat horse race in Britain

- Class: Group 3
- Location: Ayr Racecourse; Ayr, Scotland
- Race type: Flat / Thoroughbred
- Sponsor: Ladbrokes
- Website: Ayr

Race information
- Distance: 6f (1,207 metres)
- Surface: Turf
- Track: Straight
- Qualification: Two-year-old fillies
- Weight: 9 st 2 lb Penalties; 5 lb for G1 / G2 winners 3 lb for G3 winners
- Purse: £65,000 (2025); 1st: £36,862

Firth Of Clyde Stakes
2026
Silent Beauty	Ruby Moon	Angel In My Heart

Previous years
2025
Catching The Moon	Lam Yai	Isle of Fernandez
2024
Sky Majesty	Maw Lam	Grande Marques
2023
Prime Art	Great Generation	Navassa Island
2022
Barefoot Angel	Believing	Queen Me
2021
Nazanin	Canonized	Hala Hala Athmani

2020-2011
2020
Umm Kulthum	Scarlet Bear	Lullaby Moon
2019
Rose Of Kildare	Graceful Magic	Endless Joy
2018
Queen Of Bermuda	Shumookhi	Light My Fire
2016
Delectation	Rosebride	Belle Meade
2015
Shaden	Only Mine	Priceless
2014
Dark Reckoning	Parsley	Ainippe
2013
Coral Mist	Hoku	Ventura Mist
2012
Melody Of Love	Mary's Daughter	Momalorka
2011
Roger Sez	Miss Work of Art	Mary Fildes

2010-2001
2010
Majestic Dubawi	Ragsah	Barefoot Lady
2009
Distinctive	Midnight Martini	Astrophysical Jet
2008
Aspen Darlin	Sneak Preview	Danehill Destiny
2007
Unilateral	Broken Applause	Highland Daughter
2006
Princess Iris	Roxan	La Presse
2005
Violette	Gallery Girl	Strut
2004
Golden Legacy	Nufoos	Castelletto
2003
Ruby Rocket	Unshooda	Tentative
2002
Airwave	Irresistible	Miss Takeortwo
2001
Misterah	Good Girl	Entrap

2000-1991
2000
Alshadiyah	Ash Moon	Dance On
1999
Femme Fatale	Roo	Misty Miss
1998
Evening Promise	First Musical	Alexis
1997
Regal Revolution	Sapphire Ring	Thanksgiving
1996
Queen Sceptre	Head Over Heels	Miss Stamper
1995
My Branch	Home Shopping	Amaniy
1994
Loyalize	Painted Madam	Germane
1993
Braari	Knayton Lass	Randonneur
1992
White Shadow	Yakin	Star Family Friend
1991
Mamma's Too	Harvest Girl	Atmospheric Blues

1990-1988
1990
Imperfect Circle	Himiko	Panchos Pearl
1989
Tabdea	Performing Arts	May Hinton
1988
Alcando	Song Of Hope	Balizara

The Firth of Clyde Stakes is a Group 3 flat horse race in Great Britain open to two-year-old fillies. It is run at Ayr over a distance of 6 furlongs (1,207 metres), and it is scheduled to take place each year in September.

The event is named after the Firth of Clyde, an area of water off the coast of Ayr. For a period it held Listed status, and it was promoted to Group 3 level in 2004. It is now the only Group race in Scotland.

The Firth of Clyde Stakes is held during the three-day Ayr Gold Cup Festival (previously known as the Western Meeting). It is currently run on the final day, the same day as the Ayr Gold Cup.

== Records ==
Leading jockey (3 wins):

- Paul Mulrennan – Melody of Love (2012), Delectation (2016), Barefoot Angel (2022)

Leading trainer (5 wins):

- Barry Hills – Mofida (1976), Ulla Laing (1984), Braari (1993), My Branch (1995), Queen Sceptre (1996)

== Winners ==
Year	Winner	Jockey	Trainer	Time
1965	Every Blessing	Lester Piggott	Noel Murless	1:20.49
1966	Tasty	Walter Bentley	Sam Hall	1:18.41
1967	El-Al	George Cadwaladr	Clem Magnier	1:13.05
1968	Noddy Time	Eddie Hide	Dave Thom	1:16.60
1969	Royal Pancake	Sandy Barclay	Noel Murless	1:13.97
1970	Karenina	Sandy Barclay	Noel Murless	1:17.28
1971	Sea Music	Greville Starkey	Henry Cecil	1:16.43
1972	Masandra	Richard Hutchinson	Nigel Angus	1:15.47
1973	Angel's Two	John Lowe	Bill Elsey	1:14.62
1974	Vanda Diana	Shaun Salmon	Rufus Beasley	1:19.93
1975	Woodsome	Ernie Johnson	Tim Fairhurst	1:14.96
1976	Mofida	Ernie Johnson	Barry Hills	1:11.86
1977	Saltation	George Duffield	Harry Thomson Jones	1:10.12
1978	Abbeydale	John Lowe	Bill Watts	1:17.14
1979	Pink Blues	Taffy Thomas	Frankie Durr	1:16.73
1980	Star Pastures	Brian Taylor	Jeremy Hindley	1:17.10
1981	Warm Hearted	Philip Robinson	Frankie Durr	1:13.32
1982	Myras Best	Ray Cochrane	Robert Williams	1:15.28
1983	Rocket Alert	Tony Ives	Bill O'Gorman	1:16.11
1984	Ulla Laing	Paul Cook	Barry Hills	1:19.90
1985	Abandoned due to waterlogging
1986	Linda's Magic	Paul Tulk	Robert Armstrong	1:10.93
1987	Aim for the Top	John Reid	Michael Stoute	1:15.71
1988	Alcando	Simon Whitworth	Charlie James	1:15.90
1989	Tabdea	Mark Birch	Alex Scott	1:16.52
1990	Imperfect Circle	Tony Cruz	Roger Charlton	1:13.72
1991	Mamma's Too	John Carroll	Jack Berry	1:13.40
1992	White Shadow	Pat Eddery	Roger Charlton	1:16.71
1993	Braari	Willie Carson	Barry Hills	1:10.62
1994	Loyalize	Frankie Dettori	David Loder	1:16.79
1995	My Branch	Michael Hills	Barry Hills	1:12.29
1996	Queen Sceptre	Kieren Fallon	Barry Hills	1:09.74
1997	Regal Revolution	John Lowe	Peter Walwyn	1:11.73
1998	Evening Promise	Jimmy Fortune	Bryan McMahon	1:16.23
1999	Femme Fatale	Kieren Fallon	William Jarvis	1:11.63
2000	Alshadiyah	Willie Supple	John Dunlop	1:14.91
2001	Misterah	Richard Hills	Marcus Tregoning	1:11.64
2002	Airwave	Chris Rutter	Henry Candy	1:13.12
2003	Ruby Rocket	Kevin Darley	Hughie Morrison	1:11.83
2004	Golden Legacy	Paul Hanagan	Richard Fahey	1:17.36
2005	Violette	Seb Sanders	Sir Mark Prescott	1:12.41
2006	Princess Iris	Franny Norton	Eoghan O'Neill	1:13.28
2007	Unilateral	Frankie Dettori	Bryan Smart	1:14.31
2008	Aspen Darlin	Jimmy Quinn	Alan Bailey	1:15.63
2009	Distinctive	Tom Eaves	Bryan Smart	1:11.98
2010	Majestic Dubawi	Chris Catlin	Mick Channon	1:12.01
2011	Roger Sez	David Allan	Tim Easterby	1:17.71
2012	Melody of Love	Paul Mulrennan	Ann Duffield	1:16.33
2013	Coral Mist	Tom Queally	Charles Hills	1:14.24
2014	Dark Reckoning	Graham Lee	Ann Duffield	1:11.01
2015	Shaden	Hayley Turner	Lady Cecil	1:11.49
2016	Delectation	Paul Mulrennan	Bryan Smart	1:14.27
2017	Abandoned due to waterlogging
2018	Queen of Bermuda	Joe Fanning	William Haggas	1:16.74
2019	Rose of Kildare	Joe Fanning	Mark Johnston	1:10.76
2020	Umm Kulthum	Paul Hanagan	Richard Fahey	1:12.52
2021	Nazanin	Hollie Doyle	Archie Watson	1:11.83
2022	Barefoot Angel	Paul Mulrennan	Richard Fahey	1:11.67
2023	Prime Art	Ben Curtis	Johnny Murtagh	1:11.51
2024	Sky Majesty	Callum Rodriguez	William Haggas	1:08.45
2025	Catching The Moon	Oisin Orr	Richard Fahey	1:13.24
2026	Silent Beauty	David Egan	Kevin Philippart De Foy	1:18.15

== See also ==
- Horse racing in Great Britain
- List of British flat horse races
