= Lemon Souffle =

British Thoroughbred racehorse

- Racing silks of Lord Carnarvon
- Sire: Salse
- Grandsire: Topsider
- Dam: Melodrama
- Damsire: Busted
- Sex: Mare
- Foaled: 22 February 1991
- Country: United Kingdom
- Colour: Bay
- Breeder: Highclere Stud
- Owner: Lord Carnarvon
- Trainer: Richard Hannon Sr.
- Record: 8:5-0-1
- Earnings: £141,615

Major wins
- Cherry Hinton Stakes (1993); Moyglare Stud Stakes (1993); Falmouth Stakes (1994)

Awards
- European Champion Two-Year-Old Filly (1993)
- Last updated on 20 September 2006

Lemon Souffle (22 February 1991–8 October 2001) was a European champion Thoroughbred racehorse, bred and trained in the United Kingdom. In the International Classification for 1993 she was the highest-rated two-year-old filly in Europe and was named European Champion Two-Year-Old Filly at the Cartier Racing Awards. In her championship year she won four of her five races including Cherry Hinton Stakes and the Moyglare Stud Stakes. She was also successful at three, winning the Falmouth Stakes. Lemon Souffle was kept in training at four but did not appear on the racecourse and was retired to stud. She was later sold to be a broodmare in Japan.

== Background ==
Lemon Souffle was sired by Salse, a grandson of Northern Dancer, out of the Busted mare Melodrama. She was bred by her owner, Lord Carnarvon at the Highclere Stud in Berkshire from a family which had been in his ownership for many generations.

Salse, the winner of the Prix de la Forêt in 1988, became a successful stallion, siring the winners of over three hundred races including eleven at Group One level. Although he showed his best form over seven furlongs, Salse was capable of producing horses who stayed much further, including Classic Cliche (St Leger, Gold Cup), Luso (Hong Kong Vase) and Timboroa (Turf Classic) as well as faster horses like Air Express (Queen Elizabeth II Stakes) and Lemon Souffle herself. Lemon Souffle's dam, Melodrama, won two races and also produced Caramba (by Belmez), winner of the Nassau Stakes and the Falmouth Stakes.

Lord Carnarvon reportedly named the filly after lemon soufflé, one of his wife's favourite recipes. Lemon Souffle was a temperamental filly: Lord Carnarvon described her as "a lively lady", while her trainer, commenting on the difficulty of administering medical treatment, said that "you wouldn't get near her with a needle, she'd kill you."

She was trained at ages two and three by Richard Hannon Sr. and was ridden all her races by Lester Piggott, who was approaching the end of his career and obtaining fewer rides on top-class horses.

== Racing career ==
=== 1993: two-year-old season ===
Lemon Souffle never ran in a maiden race, instead making her debut against more experienced fillies in a race at Windsor in April. She was always close to the pace and went clear in the closing stages to win by two and a half lengths. At Newbury in June she faced two winning colts in a three-runner stakes race. Piggott settled her in second before taking the lead two furlongs out. She immediately went clear and pulled away to win by six lengths.

A month later, she was moved up to Group Three class for the Cherry Hinton Stakes at Newmarket. Lemon Souffle started 5/4 favourite, despite looking unimpressive before the race, and won "readily" by one and a half lengths. The Independent called it "the best performance by a two-year-old this season" while Hannon claimed that the filly could "quicken as well as anything we've ever seen". The form of the race however was not particularly strong: none of her seven rivals ever won a Group race. After the race the bookmakers offered her at odds of 14/1 for the following year's 1000 Guineas.

On her next start, Lemon Souffle was sent to Ireland for the Group One Moyglare Stud Stakes over seven furlongs at the Curragh, after being forced to miss the Lowther Stakes with a minor injury. Piggott held the filly up in the early stages before challenging in the straight. Lemon Souffle showed good acceleration to take the lead a furlong out and then pulled away to win by four lengths from the André Fabre-trained Spain Lane.

On her last start of the year, Lemon Souffle was sent to Newmarket for the Group One Cheveley Park Stakes for which she was made odds-on favourite. Her main danger was expected to come from her stable companion Risky, the winner of the Queen Mary Stakes and the Molecomb Stakes, who started at 7/2. Risky took the lead tracked by Piggott on Lemon Souffle. When she was asked to quicken however, Lemon Souffle could make no impression on her stable-mate. The outsider Prophecy came from well off the pace to catch Risky near the finish, with Lemon Souffle two lengths back in third. There was a legitimate excuse for her performance, as she was struck into during the race and came back with a badly gashed hind leg. She had suffered damage to the tendons in her leg, but her racing career was saved after intensive veterinary treatment.

=== 1994: three-year-old season ===
As a three-year-old, Lemon Souffle was trained for the 1000 Guineas, for which she was favourite. She took time to recover from her injury however, and her progress was delayed by the cold, wet spring. A week before the race, Hannon announced that she would not run as he had been unable to get her into top condition.

She did not appear until the Royal Ascot meeting in June. In the Coronation Stakes she started at 8/1 and ran on steadily in the straight to finish fourth to Kissing Cousin. In July she was made favourite for the Falmouth Stakes, then a Group Two race, at Newmarket. Piggott moved her into the lead two furlongs out and she ran on strongly to win "comfortably" by one and a quarter lengths. Hannon paid tribute to the filly's recuperation, saying that "to come back from what she's been through is unbelievable."

She was then off the racecourse for three months, missing intended runs in the Prix Jacques Le Marois and the Queen Elizabeth II Stakes, after problems in training. On her final start she ran unplaced in the Prix de la Forêt at Longchamp in October.

=== 1995: four-year-old season ===
According to the Racing Post Lemon Souffle became the property of Susan Magnier and was sent to Ireland to be trained by Dermot Weld in March or April 1995. She did not run for her new connections and was retired to stud.

== Race record ==
Date	Race	Dist (f)	Course	Class	Prize (£K)	Odds	Runners	Placing	Margin	Time	Jockey	Trainer
26 April 1993	Lady Caroline Stakes	5	Windsor		3	3/1	9	1	2.5	1:02.50	Lester Piggott	Richard Hannon Sr.
10 June 1993	Sikkens Masterstroke Stakes	6	Newbury		5	5/4	3	1	6	1:12.28	Lester Piggott	Richard Hannon Sr.
6 July 1993	Cherry Hinton Stakes	6	Newmarket July	3	15	5/4	8	1	1.5	1:12.63	Lester Piggott	Richard Hannon Sr.
12 September 1993	Moyglare Stud Stakes	7	The Curragh	1	60	100/30	11	1	2.5	1:27.50	Lester Piggott	Richard Hannon Sr.
29 September 1993	Cheveley Park Stakes	6	Newmarket Rowley	1	73	4/6	6	3	2.5	1:14.68	Lester Piggott	Richard Hannon Sr.
15 June 1994	Coronation Stakes	8	Ascot	1	128	8/1	10	4	3	1:39.96	Lester Piggott	Richard Hannon Sr.
6 July 1994	Falmouth Stakes	8	Newmarket July	2	33	6/5	6	1	1.25	1:41.30	Lester Piggott	Richard Hannon Sr.
16 October 1994	Prix de la Forêt	7	Longchamp	1	57	13/1	12	8	9.5	1:21.20	Lester Piggott	Richard Hannon Sr.

== Assessment ==
In the International Classification for 1993 Lemon Souffle was given a rating of 118, making her officially the best filly in Europe, two pounds behind the top-rated colt Grand Lodge.

At the Cartier Racing Awards in November 1993, Lemon Souffle was awarded the title of European Champion Two-Year-Old Filly.

== Breeding record ==
At stud Lemon Souffle produced three minor winners: Ostrovsky (by Thunder Gulch), Bois de Citron (by Woodman) and Dolce Limone (by Sunday Silence). She died in Japan on 8 October 2001.

== Pedigree ==
Pedigree of Lemon Souffle (GB), bay mare, 1991
Sire Salse (USA) 1985	Topsider; 1974	Northern Dancer	Nearctic
Sire Salse (USA) 1985	Topsider; 1974	Northern Dancer	Natalma
Sire Salse (USA) 1985	Topsider; 1974	Drumtop	Round Table
Sire Salse (USA) 1985	Topsider; 1974	Drumtop	Zonah
Sire Salse (USA) 1985	Carnival Princess; 1974	Prince John	Princequillo
Sire Salse (USA) 1985	Carnival Princess; 1974	Prince John	Not Afraid
Sire Salse (USA) 1985	Carnival Princess; 1974	Carnival Queen	Amerigo
Sire Salse (USA) 1985	Carnival Princess; 1974	Carnival Queen	Circus Ring
Dam Melodrama (GB) 1978	Busted; 1963	Crepello	Donatello
Dam Melodrama (GB) 1978	Busted; 1963	Crepello	Crepuscule
Dam Melodrama (GB) 1978	Busted; 1963	Sans Le Sou	Vimy
Dam Melodrama (GB) 1978	Busted; 1963	Sans Le Sou	Martial Loan
Dam Melodrama (GB) 1978	Matinee; 1971	Zeddaan	Grey Sovereign
Dam Melodrama (GB) 1978	Matinee; 1971	Zeddaan	Vareta
Dam Melodrama (GB) 1978	Matinee; 1971	Harlequinade	Klairon
Dam Melodrama (GB) 1978	Matinee; 1971	Harlequinade	Columbine (Family: 1-e)
