= Duchess of Cambridge Stakes =

Flat horse race in Britain

- Class: Group 2
- Location: July Course; Newmarket, England
- Inaugurated: 1947
- Race type: Flat / Thoroughbred
- Sponsor: Bet365
- Website: Newmarket

Race information
- Distance: 6f (1,207 metres)
- Surface: Turf
- Track: Straight
- Qualification: Two-year-old fillies
- Weight: 9 st 2 lb Penalties; 3 lb for G1 / G2 winners
- Purse: £100,000 (2022); 1st: £56,710

Duchess Of Cambridge Stakes
2026
Senorita Bonita	Libertango	Alwaysanangel

Previous years
2025
Venetian Sun	Royal Fixation	Argentine Tango
2024
Arabian Dusk	Mountain Breeze	Heavens Gate
2023
Persian Dreamer	Star Of Mystery	Woodhay Wonder
2022
Mawj	Lezoo	Queen Olly
2021
Sandrine	Desert Dreamer	Hello You

2020-2011
2020
Dandalla	Fev Rover	Santosha
2019
Raffle Prize	Daahyeh	Final Song
2018
Pretty Pollyanna	Angel's Hideaway	Chaleur
2017
Clemmie	Nyaleti	Mamba Noire
2016
Roly Poly	Magical Fire	Nations Alexander
2015
Illuminate	Besharah	Blue Bayou
2014
Arabian Queen	High Celebrity	Tongue Twista
2013
Lucky Kristale	Rizeena	Queen Catrine
2012
Sendmylovetorose	Maureen	Jadanna
2011
Gamilati	Russelliana	Shumoos

2010-2001
2010
Memory	Soraaya	Hooray
2009
Misheer	Habaayib	Lady Darshaan
2008
Please Sing	Art Princess	Ahla Wasahl
2007
You'resothrilling	Festoso	Elletelle
2006
Sander Camillo	Alzerra	Gilded
2005
Donna Blini	Salut d'Amour	Spinning Queen
2004
Jewel In The Sand	Salsa Brava	Extreme Beauty
2003
Attraction	Pearl Grey	Birthday Suit
2002
Spinola	Cassis	Pearl Dance
2001
Silent Honor	Lady High Havens	Sundari

2000-1991
2000
Dora Carrington	Enthused	Lady Lahar
1999
Torgau	Hoh Dear	Flowington
1998
Wannabe Grand	Pipalong	Pescara
1997
Asfurah	Crazee Mental	Forest Treasure
1996
Dazzle	Ocean Ridge	Well Warned
1995
Applaud	Dance Sequence	Darling Flame
1994
Red Carnival	Harayir	Myself
1993
Lemon Souffle	Red Rita	Rohita
1992
Sayyedati	Toocando	Mystic Goddess
1991
Musicale	Coffee Ice	Miss Bluebird

1990-1988
1990
Chicarica	Zigaura	Atlantic Flyer
1989
Chimes Of Freedom	Dead Certain	Palace Street
1988
Kerrera	Aldbourne	Honoria

The Duchess of Cambridge Stakes is a Group 2 flat horse race in Great Britain open to two-year-old fillies. It is run on the July Course at Newmarket over a distance of 6 furlongs (1,207 metres), and it is scheduled to take place each year in July.

== History ==
The event was established in 1947 as the Cherry Hinton Stakes, and the inaugural running was won by Great Fun.

The present system of race grading was introduced in 1971, and for a period the Cherry Hinton Stakes was classed at Group 3 level. It was promoted to Group 2 status in 1996.

The Duchess of Cambridge Stakes is currently held on the second day of Newmarket's three-day July Festival meeting. The equivalent race for male horses is the July Stakes.

Several winners have gone on to achieve victory in the following season's 1,000 Guineas Stakes. The first was Sweet Solera in 1961, and the most recent was Mawj in 2023.

In 2013 the race was renamed the Duchess of Cambridge Stakes in honour of Catherine, Duchess of Cambridge. In the same year the Windsor Forest Stakes at Royal Ascot was renamed the Duke of Cambridge Stakes.

== Records ==
Leading jockey (5 wins):

- Walter Swinburn – Top Socialite (1984), Kerrera (1988), Chicarica (1990), Red Carnival (1994), Wannabe Grand (1998)
- Frankie Dettori - Asfurah (1997), Silent Honor (2001), Sander Camillo (2006), Gamilati (2011), Raffle Prize (2019)

Leading trainer (4 wins):

- Sir Henry Cecil – Roussalka (1974), Diminuendo (1987), Chimes of Freedom (1989), Musicale (1991)
- Sir Michael Stoute – Top Socialite (1984), Kerrera (1988), Red Carnival (1994), Dazzle (1996)

== Winners ==
Year	Winner	Jockey	Trainer	Time
1947	Great Fun	Harry Carr	Cecil Boyd-Rochfort	1:14.60
1948	Ballisland	Charlie Smirke	Dick Warden	1:14.60
1949	Diableretta	Charlie Smirke	Frank Butters	1:15.00
1950	Marteline	Charlie Smirke	Marcus Marsh	1:16.40
1951	Tikva	Charlie Elliott	Evan Williams	1:14.60
1952 (dh)	Omelia; Pirouette	Charlie Smirke; Frankie Durr	Marcus Marsh; William Smyth	1:12.20
1953	Eastern Glamour	Sir Gordon Richards	Victor Smyth	1:15.75
1954	Lucy Lufton	Willie Snaith	Sam Armstrong	1:13.14
	no race 1955
1956	Colonel's Lady	Eph Smith	Reg Day	1:17.01
1957	Munch	Doug Smith	Ryan Jarvis	1:14.97
1958	Fan Light	Manny Mercer	George Colling	1:21.60
1959	Panga	Eph Smith	Bernard van Cutsem	1:16.99
1960	Sweet Solera	Bill Rickaby	Reg Day	1:16.05
1961	Crepello's Daughter	Eddie Larkin	Jack Jarvis	1:16.54
1962	Tzigane	Scobie Breasley	Sir Gordon Richards	1:12.14
1963	Round Trip	Bill Williamson	Harry Wragg	1:15.26
1964	Greengage	Scobie Breasley	Sir Gordon Richards	1:12.53
1965	Chrona	Scobie Breasley	Fulke Johnson Houghton	1:15.48
1966	Pia	Eddie Hide	Bill Elsey	1:14.97
1967	Cease Fire	Brian Taylor	Harvey Leader	1:15.55
1968	Symona	Greville Starkey	Harvey Leader	1:17.36
1969	Wild Wings	Ron Hutchinson	John Dunlop	1:16.42
1970	Hecla	John Gorton	Bruce Hobbs	1:15.72
1971	Padrona	John Gorton	Doug Smith	1:15.48
1972	Mysterious	Geoff Lewis	Noel Murless	1:16.86
1973	Celestial Dawn	Brian Taylor	John Winter	1:14.52
1974	Roussalka	Lester Piggott	Henry Cecil	1:12.42
1975	Everything Nice	Geoff Lewis	Bruce Hobbs	1:13.67
1976	Ampulla	Willie Carson	Clive Brittain	1:14.79
1977	Turkish Treasure	Lester Piggott	Vincent O'Brien	1:14.71
1978	Devon Ditty	Greville Starkey	Harry Thomson Jones	1:15.05
1979	Mrs Penny	John Matthias	Ian Balding	1:13.00
1980	Nasseem	John Reid	Fulke Johnson Houghton	1:13.64
1981	Travel On	Joe Mercer	Peter Walwyn	1:13.72
1982	Crime of Passion	Billy Newnes	Ray Laing	1:12.36
1983	Chapel Cottage	Edward Hide	Mick Easterby	1:13.48
1984	Top Socialite	Walter Swinburn	Michael Stoute	1:13.80
1985	Storm Star	Bruce Raymond	Ian Balding	1:12.32
1986	Forest Flower	Tony Ives	Ian Balding	1:12.38
1987	Diminuendo	Steve Cauthen	Henry Cecil	1:11.32
1988	Kerrera	Walter Swinburn	Michael Stoute	1:13.29
1989	Chimes of Freedom	Steve Cauthen	Henry Cecil	1:12.18
1990	Chicarica	Walter Swinburn	John Gosden	1:11.27
1991	Musicale	Steve Cauthen	Henry Cecil	1:12.62
1992	Sayyedati	Michael Roberts	Clive Brittain	1:12.86
1993	Lemon Souffle	Lester Piggott	Richard Hannon Sr.	1:12.63
1994	Red Carnival	Walter Swinburn	Michael Stoute	1:12.18
1995	Applaud	Pat Eddery	David Loder	1:13.72
1996	Dazzle	Kieren Fallon	Michael Stoute	1:11.02
1997	Asfurah	Frankie Dettori	Saeed bin Suroor	1:12.22
1998	Wannabe Grand	Walter Swinburn	Jeremy Noseda	1:11.27
1999	Torgau	Gary Stevens	Giles Bravery	1:11.77
2000	Dora Carrington	Richard Quinn	Peter Harris	1:13.30
2001	Silent Honor	Frankie Dettori	David Loder	1:14.91
2002	Spinola	Richard Quinn	Peter Harris	1:15.58
2003	Attraction	Kevin Darley	Mark Johnston	1:11.10
2004	Jewel in the Sand	Richard Hughes	Richard Hannon Sr.	1:11.55
2005	Donna Blini	Michael Kinane	Brian Meehan	1:13.00
2006	Sander Camillo	Frankie Dettori	Jeremy Noseda	1:12.12
2007	You'resothrilling	Michael Kinane	Aidan O'Brien	1:11.66
2008	Please Sing	Edward Creighton	Mick Channon	1:14.54
2009	Misheer	Neil Callan	Clive Brittain	1:10.85
2010	Memory	Richard Hughes	Richard Hannon Sr.	1:12.44
2011	Gamilati	Frankie Dettori	Mahmood Al Zarooni	1:12.87
2012	Sendmylovetorose	Colm O'Donoghue	Andrew Oliver	1:14.53
2013	Lucky Kristale	Tom Queally	George Margason	1:10.76
2014	Arabian Queen	Ryan Moore	David Elsworth	1:15.14
2015	Illuminate	Richard Hughes	Richard Hannon Jr.	1:12.81
2016	Roly Poly	Ryan Moore	Aidan O'Brien	1:10.72
2017	Clemmie	Ryan Moore	Aidan O'Brien	1:10.34
2018	Pretty Pollyanna	Silvestre de Sousa	Michael Bell	1:11.51
2019	Raffle Prize	Frankie Dettori	Mark Johnston	1:09.09
2020	Dandalla	Ben Curtis	Karl Burke	1:11.93
2021	Sandrine	David Probert	Andrew Balding	1:10.65
2022	Mawj	Ray Dawson	Saeed bin Suroor	1:11.02
2023	Persian Dreamer	Kevin Stott	Dominic Ffrench Davis	1:13.66
2024	Arabian Dusk	Harry Davies	Simon & Ed Crisford	1:11.11
2025	Venetian Sun	Clifford Lee	Karl Burke	1:11.58
2026	Senorita Bonita	Oisin Murphy	Simon & Ed Crisford	1:11.78

== See also ==
- Horse racing in Great Britain
- List of British flat horse races
