= North Sider =

American Thoroughbred racehorse

- Sire: Topsider
- Grandsire: Northern Dancer
- Dam: Back Ack
- Damsire: Ack Ack
- Sex: Mare
- Foaled: 1982
- Country: United States
- Colour: Bay
- Breeder: Cisley Stable & Robert P. Levy
- Owner: D. Wayne Lukas & Paul V. Paternostro
- Trainer: D. Wayne Lukas
- Record: 36: 15-7-5
- Earnings: US$1,126,400

Major wins
- San Jose Handicap (1985); Foster City Stakes (1985); Bay Meadows Debutante Stakes (1985); Watch Wendy Invitational Handicap (1986); Santa Margarita Invitational Handicap (1987); Apple Blossom Handicap (1987); Maskette Stakes (1987); Vagrancy Handicap (1987); Monmouth Park Breeders' Cup Handicap (1987); Oaklawn Breeders' Cup Handicap (1987)

Awards
- American Champion Older Female Horse (1987)

North Sider (foaled in 1982) was an American Thoroughbred racehorse who was voted an Eclipse Award as the American Champion Older Female Horse of 1987.
