= Salse =

Village in Maharashtra

- village
- Location in Maharashtra, India Salse (India)
- Country: India
- State: Maharashtra
- District: Solapur district

Languages
  - Official: Marathi
- Time zone: UTC+5:30 (IST)

Salse is a village in the Karmala taluka of Solapur district in Maharashtra state, India.

== Demographics ==
Covering 1,862 hectares (4,600 acres) and comprising 581 households at the time of the 2011 census of India, Salse had a population of 2628. There were 1388 males and 1240 females, with 294 people being aged six or younger.
