= Drumtop =

American-bred Thoroughbred racehorse

- Sire: Round Table
- Grandsire: Princequillo
- Dam: Zona
- Damsire: Nasrullah
- Sex: Mare
- Foaled: 1966
- Country: United States
- Colour: Bay
- Breeder: Mrs. George G. Proskauer
- Owner: James B. Moseley
- Trainer: Roger Laurin
- Record: 44: 17-9-3
- Earnings: US$493,738

Major wins
- Princeton Handicap (1969); New York Handicap (1969); Canadian International Championship Stakes (1970); Columbiana Handicap (1970); Edgemere Handicap (1970, 1971); Camden Handicap (1971); Hialeah Turf Cup Handicap (1971); Palm Beach Handicap (1971); Bowling Green Handicap (1971)

Honours
- Drumtop Handicap at Belmont Park

Drumtop (1966–1983) was an American Thoroughbred horse racing mare purchased as a yearling for $47,000 who won close to half a million dollars in racing against both females and males.

== Racing career ==
In 1971 Drumtop broke three track records:

1. Hialeah Park: 12FT 2:26.4/5, February 27, 1971.
2. Garden State Park: 10FT 1:59.4/5, May 15, 1971.
3. Belmont Park: 12FT 2:25 2/5, June 12, 1971.

== Breeding record ==
When her racing career ended, Drumtop was a broodmare at Rokeby Farm in Upperville, Virginia She produced nine foals that raced of which three were stakes race winners. Drumtop's son Topsider, sired by Northern Dancer, set a new track record for 6½ furlongs at Saratoga Race Course. Topsider became a very good sire of Champions whose offspring won more than $18 million.

Drumtop died in foaling on March 4, 1983, at Rokeby Farm, Virginia.

== Pedigree ==
Pedigree of Drumtop
Sire Round Table	Princequillo	Prince Rose	Rose Prince
Sire Round Table	Princequillo	Prince Rose	Indolence
Sire Round Table	Princequillo	Cosquilla	Papyrus
Sire Round Table	Princequillo	Cosquilla	Quick Thoughts
Sire Round Table	Knight's Daughter	Sir Cosmo	The Boss
Sire Round Table	Knight's Daughter	Sir Cosmo	Ayn Hali
Sire Round Table	Knight's Daughter	Feola	Friar Marcus
Sire Round Table	Knight's Daughter	Feola	Aloe
Dam Zonah	Nasrullah	Nearco	Pharos
Dam Zonah	Nasrullah	Nearco	Nogara
Dam Zonah	Nasrullah	Mumtaz Begum	Blenheim
Dam Zonah	Nasrullah	Mumtaz Begum	Mumtaz Mahal
Dam Zonah	Gambetta	My Babu	Djebel
Dam Zonah	Gambetta	My Babu	Perfume
Dam Zonah	Gambetta	Rough Shod	Gold Bridge
Dam Zonah	Gambetta	Rough Shod	Dalmary
