= Topsider =

Thoroughbred racehorse

- Topsider's grave at Claiborne Farm
- Sire: Northern Dancer
- Grandsire: Nearctic
- Dam: Drumtop
- Damsire: Round Table
- Sex: Stallion
- Foaled: 1974
- Country: United States
- Color: Bay
- Breeder: Paul Mellon & James B. Moseley
- Owner: Ardboe Stable
- Trainer: Thomas J. Kelly
- Record: 18: 8-3-0
- Earnings: US$125,060

Major wins
- Sport Page Handicap (1978)

Topsider (1974–1992) was an American Thoroughbred racehorse. He was a bay son of the great Northern Dancer and the very speedy racing mare Drumtop.

Topsider won eight races from eighteen career starts, including the Sport Page Handicap at Aqueduct Racetrack in New York City. In another of his wins he set a new track record of 1:14 2/5 for 6½ furlongs at Saratoga Race Course.

When his racing career was over, Topsider was sent to Claiborne Farm in Kentucky where became a significant sire whose offspring won more than $18 million in racing. Among his best were two Champions: North Sider, the 1987 American Champion Older Female Horse, and Salse, a Champion Three-Year-Old in France. Topsider stood his entire career at Claiborne Farm and died there on October 18, 1992 as a result of a hernia in his diaphragm.
