= Wuheida =

British-bred Thoroughbred racehorse

- Racing silks of Godolphin
- Sire: Dubawi
- Grandsire: Dubai Millennium
- Dam: Hibaayeb
- Damsire: Singspiel
- Sex: Mare
- Foaled: 21 February 2014
- Country: United Kingdom
- Colour: Chestnut
- Breeder: Darley Stud
- Owner: Godolphin
- Trainer: Charlie Appleby
- Record: 8: 4-1-1
- Earnings: £1,201,649

Major wins
- Prix Marcel Boussac (2016); Breeders' Cup Filly & Mare Turf (2017); Dahlia Stakes (2018)

Awards
- Top-rated British 2-y-o filly (2016)

Wuheida (foaled 21 February 2014) is a British Thoroughbred racehorse and broodmare. As a juvenile she made an immediate impact, winning the Group 1 Prix Marcel Boussac on her second start and being rated the best filly of her generation trained in England. In the following year she missed the first half of the season through injury and then ran well in several major races before ending her season by winning the Breeders' Cup Filly & Mare Turf. In 2018 she won the Dahlia Stakes on her only appearance before her racing career was ended by injury.

== Background ==
Wuheida is a chestnut mare with a broken white blaze who was bred by Sheikh Mohammed's Darley Stud and raced in the colours of the Sheikh's Godolphin organisation. She was trained by Charlie Appleby, whose stable is based at Newmarket, Suffolk, but typically relocates to Dubai in winter.

She was sired by Dubawi a top-class son of Dubai Millennium, whose wins included the Irish 2,000 Guineas and the Prix Jacques Le Marois. At stud, Dubawi has been a highly-successful breeding stallion, siring major winners such as Monterosso, Al Kazeem, Makfi, Lucky Nine and Night of Thunder. Wuheida's dam Hibaayeb was a top-class racemare whose wins included the Fillies' Mile, Ribblesdale Stakes and Yellow Ribbon Stakes. She was descended from Oh So Fair, an influential broodmare whose other descendants have included Oh So Sharp, Shantou, Collier Hill, Roussalka and Ameerat.

== Racing career ==
=== 2016: two-year-old season ===
Wuheida began her racing career in a seven furlong maiden race at Newmarket Racecourse on 6 August in which she started the 15/8 favourite and won by one and a quarter lengths from Spatial. For her next appearance the filly was sent to France and moved up sharply in class to contest the Group 1 Prix Marcel Boussac over 1600 metres at Chantilly Racecourse on 2 October. She started at odds of 10/1 in an eleven-runner field which included Dabyah (the 3/1 favourite), Promise To Be True (Silver Flash Stakes), Toulifaut (Prix d'Aumale) and Cavale Doree (Prix du Calvados). Ridden by William Buick, Wuheida was among the leaders from the start as Dabyah set the pace and then made a forward move in the straight. She went to the front 120 metres from the finish and won by three quarters of a length and a short neck from Promise To Be True and Dabyah.

In the official European Classification of two-year-olds for 2016 Wuheida was given a rating of 114, making her the best two-year-old filly trained in Britain (alongside Queen Kindly) and the fifth-best juvenile filly in Europe, behind Lady Aurelia, Brave Anna, Rhododendron and Roly Poly.

=== 2017: three-year-old season ===
A training setback in spring ruled Wuheida out of both the 1000 Guineas and Epsom Oaks. She eventually returned in the Falmouth Stakes at Newmarket on 14 July and finished second of the seven runners behind Roly Poly. The filly was then sent to Germany and stated favourite for the Preis der Diana over 2200 metres at Düsseldorf on 6 August, but after leading in the straight she was overtaken in the closing stages and finished third behind Lacazar and Megera. On 9 September she came home fourth behind Hydrangea, Winter and Persuasive in a strongly-contested running of the Matron Stakes with Qemah, Roly Poly and Rhododendron among the beaten horses. The Prix de l'Opéra at Chantilly on 1 October resulted in a "blanket finish" with Wuheida taking fourth place, beaten a head, a neck and a neck again by Rhododendron, Hydrangea and Lady Frankel.

For her final run of the year, Wuheida was sent to California for the Breeders' Cup Filly & Mare Turf at Del Mar Racetrack on 4 November, in which she was ridden by Buick and started at odds of 8/1. Lady Eli started favourite, while the other twelve runners included Rhododendron, Queen's Trust (winner of the race in 2016) and Senga. Buick tracked the pace-setting Zipessa before sending Wuheida to the front as the field exited the final turn. The filly stayed on strongly in the closing stages and won by a length from Rhododendron, with third place going to the outsider Cambodia. After the race Buick said "She's a push-button ride. I could send her forward from the gate and get her into a nice rhythm, and the trip was never a concern. I was very happy throughout and I had plenty of horse and I could go where I wanted. It was a case of don’t get too excited and don’t go too soon."

In the 2017 World's Best Racehorse Rankings Wuheida was given a rating of 117, making her the 129th best racehorse in the world and the seventh best three-year-old filly.

=== 2018: four-year-old season ===
Wuheida began her third season in the Group 2 Dahlia Stakes over nine furlongs at Newmarket on 6 May. Starting the 10/11 favourite, she took the lead two furlongs out drew right away from her opponents to win "easily" by four lengths from Wilamina.

Shortly after her win in the Dahlia Stakes, Wuheida suffered a recurrence of her earlier injury and was retired from racing. Appleby commented "I am pleased she went out on a high with such an emphatic win at Newmarket. She was a very talented filly". He said her owner-breeder Godolphin "looks forward to seeing her progeny in due course."

== Pedigree ==
Pedigree of Wuheida (GB), chestnut mare, 2014
Sire Dubawi (IRE) 2002	Dubai Millennium (GB); 1996	Seeking the Gold	Mr. Prospector
Sire Dubawi (IRE) 2002	Dubai Millennium (GB); 1996	Seeking the Gold	Con Game
Sire Dubawi (IRE) 2002	Dubai Millennium (GB); 1996	Colorado Dancer	Shareef Dancer
Sire Dubawi (IRE) 2002	Dubai Millennium (GB); 1996	Colorado Dancer	Fall Aspen
Sire Dubawi (IRE) 2002	Zomaradah (GB); 1995	Deploy	Shirley Heights
Sire Dubawi (IRE) 2002	Zomaradah (GB); 1995	Deploy	Slightly Dangerous
Sire Dubawi (IRE) 2002	Zomaradah (GB); 1995	Jawaher	Dancing Brave
Sire Dubawi (IRE) 2002	Zomaradah (GB); 1995	Jawaher	High Tern
Dam Hibaayeb (GB) 2007	Singspiel (IRE); 1992	In the Wings	Sadler's Wells
Dam Hibaayeb (GB) 2007	Singspiel (IRE); 1992	In the Wings	High Hawk
Dam Hibaayeb (GB) 2007	Singspiel (IRE); 1992	Glorious Song	Halo
Dam Hibaayeb (GB) 2007	Singspiel (IRE); 1992	Glorious Song	Ballade
Dam Hibaayeb (GB) 2007	Lady Zonda (GB); 1999	Lion Cavern	Mr. Prospector
Dam Hibaayeb (GB) 2007	Lady Zonda (GB); 1999	Lion Cavern	Secrettame
Dam Hibaayeb (GB) 2007	Lady Zonda (GB); 1999	Zonda	Fabulous Dancer
Dam Hibaayeb (GB) 2007	Lady Zonda (GB); 1999	Zonda	Oh So Hot (Family 9-c)
