= Hydrangea (horse) =

Irish-bred Thoroughbred racehorse

- Racing silks of Mr Derrick Smith
- Sire: Galileo
- Grandsire: Sadler's Wells
- Dam: Beauty Is Truth
- Damsire: Pivotal
- Sex: Mare
- Foaled: 1 April 2014
- Country: Ireland
- Colour: Bay
- Breeder: Beauty Is Truth Syndicate
- Owner: Susan Magnier, Michael Tabor & Derrick Smith
- Trainer: Aidan O'Brien
- Record: 19: 4-6-2
- Earnings: £976,930

Major wins
- 1,000 Guineas Trial Stakes (2017); Matron Stakes (2017); British Champions Fillies & Mares S. (2017)

Awards
- Top-rated Irish 3-y-o filly (2017)

Hydrangea (foaled 1 April 2014) is an Irish Thoroughbred racehorse. She spent much of her early career being overshadowed by her more illustrious stablemates Rhododendron and Winter (despite beating the latter in the 1,000 Guineas Trial Stakes). In August 2017 she defeated an exceptionally strong field to win the Matron Stakes and went on to take the British Champions Fillies & Mares Stakes.

== Background ==
Hydrangea is a bay mare with a small white star bred in Ireland by the Beauty is Truth Syndicate, a breeding company associated with the Coolmore Stud. The filly was sent into training with Aidan O'Brien at Ballydoyle. Like many Coolmore horses, the official details of her ownership have changed from race to race but she has usually been described as being owned by a partnership of Derrick Smith, Michael Tabor and Susan Magnier.

She was sired by Galileo, who won the Derby, Irish Derby and King George VI and Queen Elizabeth Stakes in 2001. Galileo is now one of the world's leading stallions and has been champion sire of Great Britain and Ireland five times. His other progeny include Cape Blanco, Frankel, Golden Lilac, Nathaniel, New Approach, Rip Van Winkle, Found Minding and Ruler of the World. Hydrangea's dam Beauty Is Truth was a high-class sprinter whose wins included the Prix d'Arenberg and the Prix du Gros Chêne and whose other foals have included The United States (Ranvet Stakes) and Fire Lily (Anglesey Stakes). She was a descendant of the broodmare Irish Lass (foaled 1962), the female-line ancestor of numerous major winners including Bikala, Assert, Eurobird and Last Tycoon.

As a daughter of Galileo out of a Pivotal mare she was bred on very similar lines to her stablemate and contemporary Rhododendron, against whom she raced on several occasions.

== Racing career ==
=== 2016: two-year-old season ===
On her racecourse debut Hydrangea ran unplaced in a maiden race over six furlongs at the Curragh on 17 July and then finished second in a similar event at Galway Races nine days later. In a minor event over seven furlongs at the Curragh she started the 4/9 favourite she recorded her first success as she led from the start and won "comfortably" by two and a quarter lengths from Madame Cherie.

Hydrangea was then stepped up in class and finished second in her next three races. She was beaten a head by Rhododendron in the Group 2 Debutante Stakes, a short head by Intricately in the Group 1 Moyglare Stud Stakes and two and a quarter lengths by Rhododendron in the Fillies' Mile. On her last run of the year she was sent to California to contest the Breeders' Cup Juvenile Fillies Turf at Santa Anita Park but came home last of the fourteen runners behind New Money Honey.

=== 2017: three-year-old season ===
On 8 April at Leopardstown Racecourse Hydrangea started at odds of 5/1 for the 1,000 Guineas Trial Stakes in which her opponents included Promise To Be True (Silver Flash Stakes), Winter and Intricately. Ridden by Padraig Beggy she disputed the lead from the start and stayed on well in the final furlong to win by a head from Winter. Hydrangea was beaten by Winter in her next four races, finishing tenth in the 1000 Guineas, third in the Irish 1,000 Guineas, third in the Coronation Stakes and fourth in the Nassau Stakes. On 9 September Hydrangea, ridden by Wayne Lordan, started a 20/1 outsider for the Matron Stakes over one mile at Leopardstown. The field was a very strong one: Winter started favourite while the other contenders included Qemah, Persuasive, Roly Poly, Wuheida, Rhododendron and Intricately. After racing in second place she looked beaten a furlong out but rallied "gamely" in the closing stages to win by a head from Winter. After the race Aidan O'Brien said "I'm delighted for the filly and I'm delighted for Wayne. She is Winter's work partner all year, and maybe she turned around and said Hydrangea, you can have this one today!."

At Chantilly Racecourse on 1 October Hydrangea was beaten ahead by Rhododendron in the Prix de l'Opéra over 2000 metres. Ryan Moore took the ride Ascot Racecourse 20 days later when the filly was stepped up in distance for the British Champions Fillies & Mares Stakes over one and a half miles on soft ground. The Prix Vermeille winner Bateel started favourite ahead of Journey with Hydrangea the 4/1 third choice in the betting. The other seven runners included Coronet (Ribblesdale Stakes), The Juliet Rose (Prix de Royallieu), Left Hand (2016 Prix Vermeille), Horseplay (Pretty Polly Stakes) and Alyssa (Park Hill Stakes). Hydrangea tracked the leaders, took the lead in the straight and fought off a challenge from Bateel before drawing away to win by two lengths. O'Brien commented "She's by Galileo and they will not stop, their will to win is incredible. She pulled out more and it was Ryan's idea to run her as he thought there was a chance she’d get the trip. We weren’t sure, but she did".

In the 2017 World's Best Racehorse Rankings Hydrangea was given a rating of 119, making her the 59th best racehorse in the world and the third-best three-year-old filly, level with Winter and behind Enable and Lady Aurelia.

=== 2018: four-year-old season ===
On her four-year-old debut, Hydrangea started favourite for the Lanwades Stud Stakes at the Curragh in May but was beaten into second place by the Mick Channon-trained Opal Tiara. In her next two races (both at Ascot) she was unplaced in the Duke of Cambridge Stakes and then finished last of seven in the King George VI and Queen Elizabeth Stakes. After a two-month break the filly returned to run for a second time in the British Champions Fillies & Mares Stakes on 20 October and came home fifth of the eleven runners behind Magical.

== Pedigree ==
Pedigree of Hydrangea (IRE), bay filly, 2014
Sire Galileo (IRE) 1998	Sadler's Wells (USA); 1981	Northern Dancer	Nearctic
Sire Galileo (IRE) 1998	Sadler's Wells (USA); 1981	Northern Dancer	Natalma
Sire Galileo (IRE) 1998	Sadler's Wells (USA); 1981	Fairy Bridge	Bold Reason
Sire Galileo (IRE) 1998	Sadler's Wells (USA); 1981	Fairy Bridge	Special
Sire Galileo (IRE) 1998	Urban Sea (USA) ch. 1989	Miswaki	Mr. Prospector
Sire Galileo (IRE) 1998	Urban Sea (USA) ch. 1989	Miswaki	Hopespringseternal
Sire Galileo (IRE) 1998	Urban Sea (USA) ch. 1989	Allegretta	Lombard
Sire Galileo (IRE) 1998	Urban Sea (USA) ch. 1989	Allegretta	Anatevka
Dam Beauty Is Truth (IRE) 2004	Pivotal (GB); 1993	Polar Falcon	Nureyev
Dam Beauty Is Truth (IRE) 2004	Pivotal (GB); 1993	Polar Falcon	Marie d'Argonne
Dam Beauty Is Truth (IRE) 2004	Pivotal (GB); 1993	Fearless Revival	Cozzene
Dam Beauty Is Truth (IRE) 2004	Pivotal (GB); 1993	Fearless Revival	Stufida
Dam Beauty Is Truth (IRE) 2004	Zelding (IRE); 1995	Warning	Known Fact
Dam Beauty Is Truth (IRE) 2004	Zelding (IRE); 1995	Warning	Slightly Dangerous
Dam Beauty Is Truth (IRE) 2004	Zelding (IRE); 1995	Zelda	Caerleon
Dam Beauty Is Truth (IRE) 2004	Zelding (IRE); 1995	Zelda	Mill Princess (Family 8-c)
