= 2017 World's Best Racehorse Rankings =

The 2017 World's Best Racehorse Rankings, sponsored by Longines was the 2017 edition of the World's Best Racehorse Rankings. It was an assessment of Thoroughbred racehorses issued by the International Federation of Horseracing Authorities (IFHA) on 23 January 2017. It included horses aged three or older which competed in flat races during 2017. It was open to all horses irrespective of where they raced or were trained.

== Rankings for 2017 ==
- For a detailed guide to this table, see below.

Rank	Rating	Horse	Age	Sex	Trained	Surface	Cat.
1	134	Arrogate (USA)	4	C	USA	Dirt	I
2	133	Winx (AUS)	6	M	AUS	Turf	M
3	130	Cracksman (GB)	3	C	GB	Turf	I
3	130	Gun Runner (USA)	4	C	USA	Dirt	M I
5	129	Enable (GB)	3	F	GB	Turf	L
6	126	Ulysses (GB)	4	C	GB	Turf	I
7	125	Cloth of Stars (IRE)	4	C	FR	Turf	L
7	125	Harry Angel (IRE)	3	C	GB	Turf	S
9	124	Collected (USA)	4	C	USA	Dirt	I
9	124	Kitasan Black (JPN)	5	H	JPN	Turf	L
9	124	Ribchester (IRE)	4	C	GB	Turf	M
12	123	Battaash (IRE)	3	G	GB	Turf	S
12	123	Cheval Grand (JPN)	5	H	JPN	Turf	L
12	123	Churchill (IRE)	3	C	IRE	Turf	M
12	123	Highland Reel (IRE)	5	H	IRE	Turf	L
12	123	Mor Spirit (USA)	4	C	USA	Dirt	I
12	123	Order of St George (IRE)	5	H	IRE	Turf	E
12	123	Sharp Azteca (USA)	4	C	USA	Dirt	M
12	123	World Approval (USA)	5	G	USA	Turf	M
20	122	Chautauqua (AUS)	7	G	AUS	Turf	S
20	122	Humidor (NZ)	5	G	AUS	Turf	M I
20	122	Jack Hobbs (GB)	5	H	GB	Turf	L
20	122	Lady Aurelia (USA)	3	F	USA	Turf	S
20	122	Roy H (USA)	5	G	USA	Dirt	S
20	122	Satono Crown (JPN)	5	H	USA	Turf	M I
20	122	Taareef (USA)	4	C	FR	Turf	M
20	122	Talismanic (GB)	4	C	FR	Turf	L
20	122	West Coast (USA)	3	C	USA	Dirt	M I
29	121	Barney Roy (GB)	3	C	GB	Turf	I
29	121	Beach Patrol (USA)	4	C	USA	Turf	L
29	121	Brametot (IRE)	3	C	FR	Turf	M
29	121	Drefong (USA)	4	C	USA	Dirt	S
29	121	Happy Clapper (AUS)	7	G	AUS	Turf	M
29	121	Hartnell (GB)	6	G	AUS	Turf	M
29	121	Jameka (AUS)	5	M	AUS	Turf	L
29	121	Mr Stunning (AUS)	5	G	HK	Turf	S
29	121	Oscar Performance (USA)	3	C	USA	Turf	I
29	121	Redzel (AUS)	5	G	AUS	Turf	S
29	121	Rey de Oro (JPN)	3	C	JPN	Turf	L
40	120	Always Dreaming (USA)	3	C	USA	Dirt	I
40	120	Battle of Midway (USA)	3	C	USA	Dirt	M
40	120	Big Orange (GB)	6	G	GB	Turf	E
40	120	Capri (IRE)	3	C	IRE	Turf	L E
40	120	Caravaggio (USA)	3	C	IRE	Turf	S
40	120	Decorated Knight (GB)	5	H	GB	Turf	I
40	120	Dschingis Secret (GER)	4	C	GER	Turf	L
40	120	Gold Actor (JPN)	6	H	JPN	Turf	L
40	120	Heshem (IRE)	4	C	FR	Turf	M
40	120	Le Brivido (FR)	3	C	FR	Turf	M
40	120	Legal Eagle (SAF)	6	G	SAF	Turf	M
40	120	Le Romain (AUS)	5	G	AUS	Turf	S M
40	120	Marinaresco (SAF)	5	G	SAF	Turf	L
40	120	Minding (IRE)	4	F	IRE	Turf	I
40	120	Mind Your Biscuits (USA)	4	C	USA	Dirt	S
40	120	Mutakayyef (GB)	6	G	GB	Turf	M
40	120	Puerto Escondido (ARG)	4	C	ARG	Turf	L
40	120	Satono Diamond (JPN)	4	C	JPN	Turf	E
40	120	Vega Magic (AUS)	5	G	AUS	Turf	S M
59	119	Al Wukair (IRE)	3	C	FR	Turf	M
59	119	Bateel (IRE)	5	M	FR	Turf	L
59	119	Beauty Only (IRE)	6	G	HK	Turf	M
59	119	Black Heart Bart (AUS)	7	G	AUS	Turf	M
59	119	Deauville (IRE)	4	C	IRE	Turf	M
59	119	Diversify (USA)	4	G	USA	Dirt	I
59	119	Forever Unbridled (USA)	5	M	USA	Dirt	M
59	119	Guignol (GER)	5	H	GER	Turf	L
59	119	Helene Paragon (FR)	5	G	HK	Turf	M
59	119	Hydrangea (IRE)	3	F	IRE	Turf	L
59	119	Idaho (IRE)	4	C	IRE	Turf	L
59	119	Imperial Hint (USA)	4	C	USA	Dirt	S
59	119	Librisa Breeze (GB)	5	G	GB	Turf	S
59	119	Limato (IRE)	5	G	GB	Turf	M
59	119	Lucky Bubbles (AUS)	6	G	HK	Turf	S
59	119	Marsha (IRE)	4	F	GB	Turf	S
59	119	Neorealism (JPN)	6	H	JPN	Turf	I
59	119	Our Ivanhowe (GER)	7	H	AUS	Turf	I
59	119	Peniaphobia (IRE)	6	G	HK	Turf	S
59	119	Poet's Word (IRE)	4	C	GB	Turf	I
59	119	Rapper Dragon (GER)	5	G	HK	Turf	I
59	119	Rekindling (IRE)	3	C	GB	Turf	E
59	119	Shaman Ghost (CAN)	5	H	USA	Dirt	M I
59	119	Sixties Song (ARG)	4	C	ARG	Turf	L
59	119	Thewizardofoz (AUS)	6	G	HK	Turf	M
59	119	Time Warp (GB)	4	G	HK	Turf	I
59	119	War Story (USA)	5	G	USA	Dirt	I
59	119	Werther (NZ)	6	G	HK	Turf	L
59	119	Wings of Eagles (FR)	3	C	IRE	Turf	L
59	119	Winter (IRE)	3	F	IRE	Turf	M I
90	118	Abel Tasman (USA)	3	F	USA	Dirt	M
90	118	Admire Deus (JPN)	6	H	JPN	Turf	E
90	118	Al Ain (JPN)	3	C	JPN	Turf	I
90	118	Amazing Kids (AUS)	6	G	HK	Turf	S
90	118	Ballet Concerto (GB)	4	G	GB	Turf	M
90	118	Beat The Bank (GB)	3	G	GB	Turf	M
90	118	Beauty Generation (NZ)	5	G	HK	Turf	M
90	118	Captain America (SAF)	7	G	SAF	Turf	M
90	118	Cloud Computing (USA)	3	C	USA	Dirt	I
90	118	Contentment (AUS)	7	G	HK	Turf	M
90	118	Copano Rickey (JPN)	7	H	JPN	Dirt	I
90	118	Crystal Ocean (GB)	3	C	GB	Turf	E
90	118	Edict of Nantes (SAF)	4	C	SAF	Turf	M
90	118	Elate (USA)	3	F	USA	Dirt	I M
90	118	Ertijaal (IRE)	6	G	UAE	Turf	S
90	118	Gingernuts (NZ)	4	G	NZ	Turf	I L
90	118	Hawkbill (USA)	4	C	GB	Turf	L
90	118	Inns of Court (IRE)	4	C	FR	Turf	M
90	118	Iquitos (GER)	4	C	GER	Turf	I L
90	118	Kiseki (JPN)	3	C	JPN	Turf	E
90	118	Notlistenin'tome (AUS)	7	G	HK	Turf	S
90	118	Pakistan Star (GER)	4	G	HK	Turf	I
90	118	Persian Knight (JPN)	3	C	JPN	Turf	M
90	118	Persuasive (IRE)	4	F	GB	Turf	M
90	118	Rainbow Line (JPN)	4	C	JPN	Turf	M
90	118	Redkirk Warrior (GB)	6	G	AUS	Turf	S
90	118	Satono Aladdin (JPN)	6	H	JPN	Turf	M
90	118	Sharp Samurai (USA)	3	C	USA	Turf	M
90	118	Songbird (USA)	4	F	USA	Dirt	M I
90	118	Staphanos (JPN)	6	H	JPN	Turf	I
90	118	Stradivarius (GB)	3	C	GB	Turf	E
90	118	Suave Richard (JPN)	3	C	JPN	Turf	L
90	118	Terravista (AUS)	8	G	AUS	Turf	S
90	118	Thunder Snow (IRE)	3	C	GB	Turf	M
90	118	Tosen Stardom (JPN)	6	H	AUS	Turf	M I
90	118	Trapeze Artist (AUS)	3	C	AUS	Turf	M
90	118	Trip To Heaven (SAF)	6	G	SAF	Turf	S
90	118	Whisky Baron (AUS)	5	G	SAF	Turf	I

== Guide ==
A complete guide to the main table above.

Rank
A horse's position in the list, with the most highly rated at number 1. Each horse is ranked once according to its highest rating. Any lesser ratings for the same horse are not ranked.

Rating
A rating represents a weight value in pounds, with higher values given to horses which showed greater ability. It is judged that these weights would equalise the abilities of the horses if carried in a theoretical handicap race. The minimum rating required for inclusion is 115.

Horse
Each horse's name is followed by a suffix (from the IFHA's International Code of Suffixes) which indicates the country foaled.

Age
The age of the horse at the time it achieved its rating. The racing ages of all horses foaled in a particular part of the world increase simultaneously, regardless of the actual date of foaling.
Dates of age increase by location foaled
Northern Hemisphere	1 January
South America	1 July
Australia, New Zealand and South Africa	1 August

Sex
C	Colt	Ungelded male horse up to four-years-old
F	Filly	Female horse up to four-years-old
H	Horse	Ungelded male horse over four-years-old
M	Mare	Female horse over four-years-old
G	Gelding	Gelded male horse of any age

Trained
The country where the horse was trained at the time of the rating, abbreviated using the International Code of Suffixes.

Position
The horse's finishing position in the race shown. The actual finishing order can sometimes be amended following an inquiry or a disqualification.
=	Dead-heat
↑	Promoted from original finishing position
↓	Relegated from original finishing position

Race
The race (or one of the races) for which the horse achieved its rating. A defeated horse can be rated above its higher-placed opponents if it carried more weight.

Surface
The surface of the track on which the race was run, eg. turf or dirt. Synthetic surfaces are described as "artificial".

Distance
The distance of the race in metres. In some countries (eg. Canada, Great Britain, Ireland and the United States), the length of a race is usually expressed in miles and furlongs. These units have been converted to metres to allow for universal comparison.
Common conversions
5 furlongs	= 1,006 m	1 mile and 1½ furlongs	= 1,911 m
6 furlongs	= 1,207 m	1 mile and 2 furlongs	= 2,012 m
6½ furlongs	= 1,308 m	1 mile and 2½ furlongs	= 2,112 m
7 furlongs	= 1,408 m	1 mile and 3 furlongs	= 2,213 m
7½ furlongs	= 1,509 m	1 mile and 4 furlongs	= 2,414 m
1 mile	= 1,609 m	1 mile and 6 furlongs	= 2,816 m
1 mile and ½ furlong	= 1,710 m	2 miles	= 3,219 m
1 mile and 1 furlong	= 1,811 m	2 miles and 4 furlongs	= 4,023 m

Category
		Metres	Furlongs
S	Sprint	1,000–1,300; 1,000–1,599 (CAN / USA)	5–6.5; 5–7.99 (CAN / USA)
M	Mile	1,301–1,899; 1,600–1,899 (CAN / USA)	6.51–9.49; 8–9.49 (CAN / USA)
I	Intermediate	1,900–2,100	9.5–10.5
L	Long	2,101–2,700	10.51–13.5
E	Extended	2,701+	13.51+

International Code of Suffixes
The following countries have been represented in the WTR as foaling or training locations since the first edition in 2004.
ARG	Argentina	ITY	Italy
AUS	Australia	JPN	Japan
BRZ	Brazil	KSA	Saudi Arabia
CAN	Canada	NZ	New Zealand
CHI	Chile	SAF	South Africa
CZE	Czech Republic	SIN	Singapore
FR	France	SPA	Spain
GB	Great Britain	TUR	Turkey
GER	Germany	UAE	United Arab Emirates
HK	Hong Kong	USA	United States
HUN	Hungary	VEN	Venezuela
IRE	Ireland	ZIM	Zimbabwe

Shading
The shaded areas represent lesser ratings recorded by horses which were more highly rated in a different category. The IFHA publishes this information when the lower rating is the overall top performance in a particular category.
