= Wayne Lordan =

Irish jockey

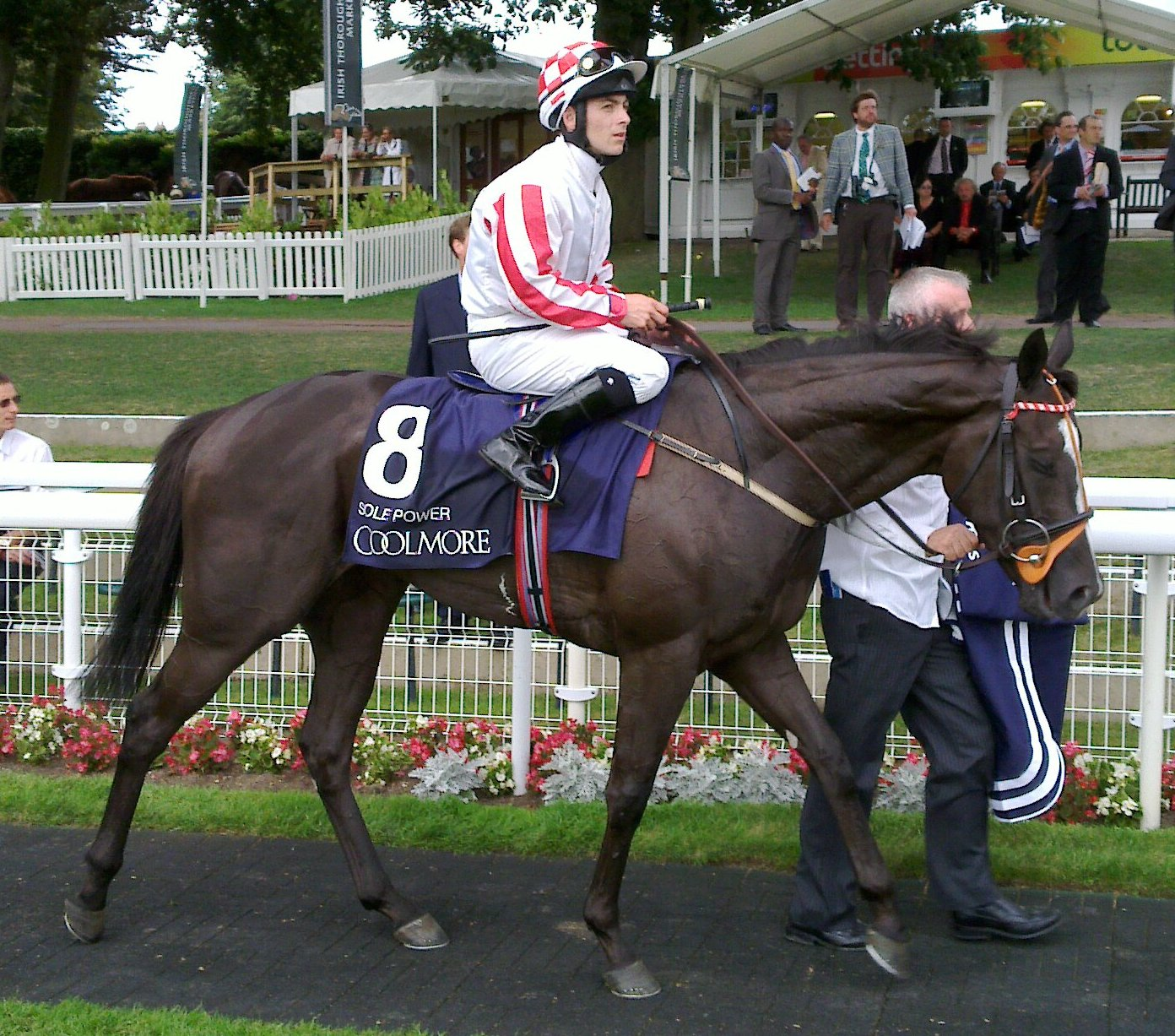
- Lordan on Sole Power after winning the 2010 Nunthorpe Stakes

Personal information
- Born: 20 April 1982 (age 44) Upton, County Cork, Ireland
- Occupation: Jockey

Horse racing career
- Sport: Horse racing

Major racing wins
- British Classics; 1,000 Guineas (2017, 2019, 2026); Epsom Derby (2025); Other major British races British Champions Sprint Stakes (2013, 2014); Diamond Jubilee Stakes (2014); Goodwood Cup (2025); July Cup (2014); Nassau Stakes (2015); Nunthorpe Stakes (2010); Irish Classics; Irish 1,000 Guineas (2026); Major Irish races Matron Stakes (2015, 2017)

Racing awards
- Horse Racing Ireland Flat Achievement Award (2019)

Significant horses
- Slade Power, Sole Power, Winter, Hermosa, Lambourn

Wayne Lordan (born 20 April 1982) is a multiple Classic and Group 1 winning Irish jockey.

== Background and early career ==
Lordan grew up in Upton, County Cork. He started pony racing when he was nine years old, following in the footsteps of his father and brother, and was noticed by trainer Thomond O'Mara. Leaving school at fourteen, he worked for O'Mara for six years. His first winner was Ethbaat for trainer Gerry Cully at Killarney on 15 July 1998. After six years with O'Mara, he moved on to the yard of Tommy Stack and then, in 2005, began riding for David Wachman as well as Stack. That year he rode 41 winners.

Lordan won his first Group 1 race on the unfancied Sole Power, owned by the Power bookmaking family and trained by Eddie Lynam, in the 2010 Nunthorpe Stakes at York. At 100/1, the horse was the longest-priced winner of a British Group 1 contest for 35 years. Interviewed the following year, he said:

Up to last year all I wanted to do was win a Group 1 and now I want another one, but the most important thing for me is to ride plenty of winners every year. Sure I dream of winning the Derby and all that stuff, but my main aim is to work hard and keep my bosses happy. The winners will come from that.

Lordan's first Royal Ascot winner was Lolly for Dolly, trained by Stack, in the 2011 Group 2 Duke of Cambridge Stakes. The following year, Duntle, trained by Wachman, won the Sandringham Handicap. In 2013, Duntle gave Lordan a second win in the Duke of Cambridge Stakes. He secured his fourth win at Royal Ascot on Slade Power, owned by the Power family and trained by Lynam, in the 2014 Group 1 Diamond Jubilee Stakes. He went on to win the 2014 Group 1 July Cup at Newmarket on Slade Power. In 2015, the filly Legatissimo, trained by Wachman, provided Lordan with two Group 1 wins - the Matron Stakes at Leopardstown and the Nassau Stakes at Goodwood.

== Ballydoyle ==
In January 2017, Lordan was taken on by trainer Aidan O'Brien at Ballydoyle as one of his team of riders. Lordan said: "I'll be riding work and trying to make best use of whatever opportunities might come my way. I'll be putting my head down and giving the job 100 per cent." Opportunity soon came his way when 9/1 chance Winter won the 1,000 Guineas in May 2017, beating her stablemate, favourite Rhododendron, ridden by Ballydoyle number one jockey Ryan Moore to give Lordan his first Classic win. Moore then took over as the rider of Winter, winning three more Group 1 races that season, but was beaten a head by Lordan on the Ballydoyle fourth string, 20/1 chance Hydrangea, in the Matron Stakes at Leopardstown in September.

In October 2018, Lordan won the Group 1 Fillies' Mile at Newmarket on Iridessa, a two-year-old trained by O'Brien's son Joseph Patrick O'Brien. Iridessa would go on to provide Lordan with three more Group 1 victories the following season, winning the Pretty Polly Stakes and the Matron Stakes in Ireland and the Breeders' Cup Filly & Mare Turf at Santa Anita in California. The 2019 season also brought another win for Lordan in the 1,000 Guineas, this time riding the Ballydoyle third string, 14/1 chance Hermosa. In December 2019, he was winner of the Flat Achievement Award at the Horse Racing Ireland Awards.

In July 2020, Lordan had a rare opportunity to ride a Ballydoyle first string in a major race. With Moore quarantined in England under COVID-19 regulations and Seamie Heffernan suspended, Lordan rode odds-on favourite Magical to her second consecutive win in the Tattersalls Gold Cup at the Curragh. In 2021 and 2022, Lordan won four Group 3 races, but, for the first time since joining Ballydoyle, there were no victories at the highest level. In September 2022, he rode 5/1 favourite Waterville from last to first in a field of 30 to win the Irish Cesarewitch, Europe's most valuable flat handicap.

Lordan rode his 1000th winner at Naas on 24 April 2023. At the 2023 Royal Ascot meeting, he won the Group 3 Jersey Stakes on 22/1 Ballydoyle second string Age of Kings. It was his fifth Royal Ascot win, his first since 2014, and his first for O'Brien. Lordan was riding San Antonio in the Irish Derby in July 2023 when the horse fractured a foreleg and unseated Lordan, who sustained a concussion and fractures to his legs and elbow. San Antonio was euthanised. Lordan was out of racing for eight months while he recovered from his injuries. On his return to racing in 2024, he was promoted to ride as second jockey for O'Brien, taking the place of Heffernan, who had left Ballydoyle.

In May 2024, Lordan won the Group 3 Leopardstown Derby Trial on Los Angeles and went on to ride him in the Epsom Derby, where they came third behind the favourite, City of Troy, ridden by Moore for O'Brien. It was Lordan's eighth ride in the race, with his best results being two previous third places - on Japan for O'Brien in 2019 and Galileo Rock for Wachman in 2013. Lordan won a total of five Group 3 races in 2024. He also won the Group 2 Railway Stakes on Henry Matisse and the Group 1 Moyglare Stud Stakes on Lake Victoria. In both races he was riding the Ballydoyle second string, while Moore rode the beaten favourite.

Lordan again won the Leopardstown Derby Trial in 2025, standing in for Moore on Delacroix, while Moore was riding Henri Matisse to win the French 2,000 Guineas on the same day. Moore took the ride on favourite Delacroix in the Epsom Derby on 7 June, while Lordan teamed up with Lambourn. He rode Lambourn in his exercise at Ballydoyle but had only ridden him once before on the racecourse, when the colt won on his debut at Killarney in July 2024.

Lambourn started at odds of 13/2 in a field of eighteen and quickly went into the lead. He made all to finish three-and-three-quarter lengths ahead of his nearest rival, 50/1 outsider Lazy Griff, ridden by Christophe Soumillon, with Delacroix and Moore finishing in ninth place. After the race, Lordan said: "This is one of the greatest races, for any jockey that starts out all they ever want to do is win a Derby. I'm in a lucky position that I get to ride a horse like this". The previous day, Lordan had ridden Whirl into second place in the Epsom Oaks.

== Personal life ==
A natural lightweight, Lordan said in a 2011 interview that he kept his weight down to 7 stone without dieting or working out. He is married to Carey-Ann, with whom he has a daughter and a son.

== Statistics ==
Flat wins in Ireland by year

Year	Wins	Runs	Strike rate %	Total earnings
1998	3	80	4	not given
1999	17	224	8	not given
2000	10	291	3	not given
2001	22	389	6	not given
2002	20	417	5	not given
2003	16	358	4	not given
2004	11	388	3	not given
2005	41	489	8	not given
2006	41	413	10	not given
2007	55	589	9	€1,537,442
2008	59	527	11	€1,346,850
2009	53	531	10	€914,105
2010	57	542	11	€1,045,769
2011	54	482	11	€1,157,170
2012	75	537	14	€1,298,759
2013	51	529	10	€1,398,304
2014	55	495	11	€1,002,280
2015	53	563	9	€1,501,220
2016	50	603	8	€956,073
2017	27	499	5	€965,540
2018	38	466	8	€902,156
2019	29	421	7	€1,297,760
2020	57	466	12	€1,647,040
2021	41	472	9	€893,033
2022	58	484	12	€1,622,025
2023	16	166	10	€463,205
2024	58	357	16	€1,785,760
2025	68	381	18	€1,594,265

Flat wins in Great Britain by year

Year	Wins	Runs	Strike rate %	Total earnings
1999	0	1	0	—
2001	1	9	11	£2,828
2002	2	54	4	£12,703
2003	0	9	0	—
2004	0	7	0	£423
2005	0	4	0	£5,500
2006	0	9	0	£5,385
2007	0	11	0	£56,183
2008	0	13	0	£148,457
2009	1	19	5	£34,054
2010	2	9	22	£171,374
2011	4	20	20	£216,487
2012	2	25	8	£79,379
2013	4	24	17	£758,307
2014	3	18	17	£895,049
2015	1	16	6	£365,049
2016	0	4	0	£36,803
2017	1	13	8	£403,291
2018	1	43	2	£538,060
2019	3	34	9	£951,151
2020	—	0	—	—
2021	0	20	0	£251,215
2022	0	7	0	£45,292
2023	1	11	9	£93,795
2024	1	27	4	£687,951
2025	4	34	12	£1,905,449

== Major wins ==
(Republic of Ireland) Ireland

- Matron Stakes - (2) - Legatissimo (2015), Hydrangea (2017)
- Moyglare Stud Stakes - (1) - Lake Victoria (2024)
- Pretty Polly Stakes - (1) - Iridessa (2019)
- Tattersalls Gold Cup - (1) - Magical (2020)
- 1,000 Guineas - (1) - Precise (2026)

(United Kingdom) Great Britain

- 1000 Guineas Stakes - (3) - Winter (2017), Hermosa (2019), True Love (2026)
- British Champions Sprint Stakes - (2) - Slade Power (2013), Gordon Lord Byron (2014)
- Cheveley Park Stakes - (1) - True Love (2025)
- Diamond Jubilee Stakes - (1) - Slade Power (2014)
- Epsom Derby - (1) - Lambourn (2025)
- Fillies' Mile - (1) - Iridessa (2018)
- Goodwood Cup - (1) - Scandinavia (2025)
- July Cup - (1) - Slade Power (2014)
- Nassau Stakes - (1) - Legatissimo (2015)
- Nunthorpe Stakes - (1) - Sole Power (2010)

United States

- Breeders' Cup Filly & Mare Turf - (1) - Iridessa (2019)
