= Senga (horse) =

American-bred racehorse

- Racing silks of Niarchos Family
- Sire: Blame
- Grandsire: Arch
- Dam: Beta Leo
- Damsire: A.P. Indy
- Sex: Mare
- Foaled: 15 March 2014
- Country: United States
- Colour: Bay
- Breeder: Flaxman Holdings
- Owner: Niarchos Family
- Trainer: Pascal Bary
- Record: 10: 3-1-2
- Earnings: £593,636

Major wins
- Prix de la Grotte (2017); Prix de Diane (2017)

Senga (15 March 2014 – 28 June 2018) was an American-bred, French-trained Thoroughbred racehorse. As a two-year-old in 2016 she showed promising form as she won her second of her three races and finished a close fourth in the Prix Marcel Boussac. In the following year she won the Prix de la Grotte on her seasonal debut and recovered from defeats in the Poule d'Essai des Pouliches and Prix de Sandringham to record her biggest win in the Prix de Diane. She was beaten in her three subsequent races and was retired from racing at the end of the year. She died in 2018.

== Background ==
Senga was a bay mare with a white blaze bred in Kentucky by Flaxman Holdings, a company set up to manage the racing interests of her owners the Niarchos family. She was sent into training with Pascal Bary at Chantilly and was ridden in all of his races by Stéphane Pasquier.

She was from the third crop of foals sired by Blame, who was the American Champion Older Dirt Male Horse in 2010, when he won the Breeders' Cup Classic. Blame's other progeny include Marley's Freedom (Ballerina Stakes), Nadal (Arkansas Derby) and Fault (Santa Margarita Stakes). Senga's dam Beta Leo showed modest racing ability, winning one minor race from five starts in France. She was a daughter of the Prix de Cabourg winner Denebola who was in turn a daughter of Coup de Genie who won the Prix Morny and was a full-sister to Machiavellian.

During Senga's racing career Longchamp Racecourse was closed for redevelopment and many major races were transferred to other tracks.

== Racing career ==
=== 2016: two-year-old season ===
Senga made her debut at Deauville Racecourse on 9 August when she started at odds of 3.4/1 for a maiden race over 1500 metres and finished second by three quarters of a length to the favourite La Cochere having taken the lead 200 metres from the finish before being overtaken in the final strides. Four weeks later the filly was matched against colts in a minor race over 1600 metres at Saint-Cloud Racecourse and recorded her first success, beating the André Fabre-trained favourite Last Kingdom by two lengths after taking the lead 150 metres from the finish. On her final run of the season Senga was stepped up in class for the Group 1 Prix Marcel Boussac, run that year over 1600 metres at Chantilly Racecourse on 2 October. Starting a 16/1 outsider she pulled hard in the early stages and briefly struggled to obtain a clear run in the straight but finished strongly to finish fourth behind Wuheida, Promise To Be True and Dabyah, beaten one and three quarter lengths by the winner.

=== 2017: three-year-old season ===
On her first appearance as a three-year-old Senga started favourite for the Group 3 Prix de la Grotte, run that year over 1600 metres at Chantilly on 16 April, with the best fancied of her six opponents being the unbeaten Lady Frankel and the Prix d'Aumale winner Toulifaut. After racing "keenly" in fourth place she took the lead approaching the last 200 metres and won "a shade cosily" by a length from La Sardane. After the race Bary said "She was a bit nervous beforehand, maybe because she was fresh, but they tend to be a little like that in the family. She relaxed well during the race, she had the perfect trip and quickened well to show her class. It was not too hard a race and the perfect re-introduction this year." On 13 May Senga started favourite for the Group 1 Poule d'Essai des Pouliches at Deauville but after racing just behind the leaders for most of the way she tired on the very soft ground and came home eleventh of the eighteen runners behind Precieuse. In the Group 2 Prix de Sandringham at Chantilly on 6 June she was restrained in the early stages before finishing well but never looked likely to win and came home third of the five runners behind La Sardane and Gold Luck.

Two weeks after her defeat in the Prix de Sandringham Senga was one of sixteen fillies to contest the Group 1 Prix de Diane over 2100 metres at Chantilly and started a 21.8/1 outsider. The Musidora Stakes winner Shutter Speed (who had beaten Enable in April) started favourite while the other contenders included Sistercharlie, Rhododendron, Terrakova (Prix Cléopâtre) and Kitesurf (Prix de Royaumont). Senga gave some trouble before the start as she was reluctant to enter stalls, and settled towards the rear of the field as the outsiders Normandie and Haya of Fortune set the pace. She produced a sustained run on the outside in the straight, overtook Shutter Speed 300 metres from the finish and stayed on in the closing stages to win by a length from the fast-finishing Sistercharlie. Pascal Bary commented "I never gave up on her. She's got a fantastic pedigree and a great physique".

After a two-month break Senga returned in the Prix de la Nonette over 2000 metres at Deauville on 19 August in which she finished third of the nine runners behind the Prix Saint-Alary winner Sobetsu and Onthemoonagain after being outpaced in the closing stages. She was then matched against older fillies and mares in the Group 1 Prix de l'Opéra run that year over 2000 metres at Chantilly on 1 October but made little impact and came home eleventh behind Rhododendron, beaten ten and three quarter lengths by the winner. For her final run of the year, Senga was sent to California for the Breeders' Cup Filly & Mare Turf at Del Mar Racetrack on 4 November, in which she started at odds of 9/1. After tracking the leaders she made some progress in the straight but was unable to maintain her challenge and finished eighth behind Wuheida.

== Breeding record ==
At the end of her racing career Senga was retired to become a broodmare. She was in foal to Galileo when she died on 28 June 2018.

== Pedigree ==
Pedigree of Senga (USA), bay mare, 2014
Sire Blame (USA) 2006	Arch (USA); 1995	Kris S	Roberto
Sire Blame (USA) 2006	Arch (USA); 1995	Kris S	Sharp Queen
Sire Blame (USA) 2006	Arch (USA); 1995	Aurora	Danzig
Sire Blame (USA) 2006	Arch (USA); 1995	Aurora	Althea
Sire Blame (USA) 2006	Liable (USA); 1995	Seeking The Gold	Mr. Prospector
Sire Blame (USA) 2006	Liable (USA); 1995	Seeking The Gold	Con Game
Sire Blame (USA) 2006	Liable (USA); 1995	Bound	Nijinsky (CAN)
Sire Blame (USA) 2006	Liable (USA); 1995	Bound	Special
Dam Beta Leo (USA) 2007	A.P. Indy (USA); 1989	Seattle Slew	Bold Reasoning
Dam Beta Leo (USA) 2007	A.P. Indy (USA); 1989	Seattle Slew	My Charmer
Dam Beta Leo (USA) 2007	A.P. Indy (USA); 1989	Weekend Surprise	Secretariat
Dam Beta Leo (USA) 2007	A.P. Indy (USA); 1989	Weekend Surprise	Lassie Dear
Dam Beta Leo (USA) 2007	Denebola (USA); 2001	Storm Cat	Storm Bird (CAN)
Dam Beta Leo (USA) 2007	Denebola (USA); 2001	Storm Cat	Terlingua
Dam Beta Leo (USA) 2007	Denebola (USA); 2001	Coup de Genie	Mr. Prospector
Dam Beta Leo (USA) 2007	Denebola (USA); 2001	Coup de Genie	Coup de Folie (Family: 2-d)

- Senga was inbred 4 × 4 to Mr. Prospector, meaning that this stallion appears twice in the fourth generation of her pedigree.
