= Persuasive (horse) =

Irish-bred Thoroughbred racehorse

- Racing silks of Cheveley Park Stud
- Sire: Dark Angel
- Grandsire: Acclamation
- Dam: Choose Me
- Damsire: Choisir
- Sex: Mare
- Foaled: 16 March 2013
- Country: Ireland
- Colour: Grey
- Breeder: John Tuthill
- Owner: Cheveley Park Stud
- Trainer: John Gosden
- Record: 10: 6-2-1
- Earnings: £866,052

Major wins
- Sandringham Handicap (2016); Atalanta Stakes (2016); Queen Elizabeth II Stakes (2017)

Persuasive (foaled 16 March 2013) is an Irish-bred, British-trained Thoroughbred racehorse. After winning her only race as a juvenile she ran up four consecutive wins in the following season including the Sandringham Handicap and the Atalanta Stakes before her winning streak was ended by Alice Springs in the Matron Stakes. In 2017 she was placed in both the Matron Stakes and the Sun Chariot Stakes before recording her most significant victory when she became the first horse of her age and sex in more than 40 years to take the Queen Elizabeth II Stakes.

== Background ==
Persuasive is a grey mare bred in County Kildare, Ireland by John Tuthill. As a yearling in September 2014 she was put up for sale at Goffs and was bought for €180,000 by the Cheveley Park Stud. She was then sent to England and entered training with John Gosden at Newmarket, Suffolk. She was ridden in all but two of her races by Frankie Dettori.

Her sire Dark Angel won four races including the Mill Reef Stakes and the Middle Park Stakes as a two-year-old in 2007 before being retired to stud at the end of the year. Dark Angel's other offspring have included Lethal Force, Mecca's Angel and Harry Angel. Persuasive's dam Choose Me was a durable racemare who won four of her 28 tart including a valuable sales race at the Curragh and the Listed Fairy Bridge Stakes at Tipperary Racecourse. As a broodmare she has also produced the Coral Distaff winner Tisbutadream and the successful sprint handicapper Amazour. Choose Me was a great-granddaughter of the outstanding Irish racemare Cairn Rouge.

== Racing career ==
=== 2015: two-year-old season ===
Persuasive made her debut in a maiden race over one mile on the synthetic polytrack surface at Kempton Park on 4 November and started a 16/1 outsider. Ridden by Jimmy Fortune, she took the lead two furlongs out and held on to win by a neck from the favourite Secret Sense.

=== 2016: three-year-old season ===
Persuasive began her second season in handicap races, starting with a minor event over one mile at Goodwood Racecourse on 20 May in which she was assigned a weight of 133 pounds. Starting the 10/11 favourite, she took the lead inside the final furlong and won by one and a half lengths despite being eased down by Dettori near the finish. Twelve days later she followed up in a more valuable event on the synthetic track at Chelmsford City Racecourse winning "comfortably" from eight opponents. At Royal Ascot Persuasive, carrying 121 pounds, started 11/4 favourite for the Listed Sandringham Handicap on 15 June, with the best-fancied of her 20 opponents being the Owenstown Stud Stakes winner Anamba and the Queen's filly Diploma. Racing on soft ground, Persuasive went to the front approaching the final furlong and stayed on strongly to win by one and quarter lengths from Diamond Fields. Gosden described the winner as "a lovely filly" while Dettori said "She is improving. On good ground I would have waited a bit longer and used her explosive turn of foot. She can try something bigger now."

On 20 August Persuasive was stepped up in class and started 6/4 favourite for the Group 3 Atalanta Stakes at Sandown Park. Her eleven opponents included Blond Me (Coral Distaff), Spirit Raiser (Pipalong Stakes) and Red Box (Valiant Stakes). Ridden by Robert Havlin she ettled in mid-division before taking the lead a furlong out and winning in "impressive" style by three lengths from Blond Me. John Gosden commented "she did it very nicely. She's a talented, progressive filly".

The filly was undefeated in five races when she was sent to Ireland and moved up to Group 1 class for the Matron Stakes at Leopardstown Racecourse on 10 September. She briefly took the lead in the straight but was overtaken inside the final furlong and beaten into second place by Alice Springs. Qemah finished third while Jet Setting came home in sixth place.

=== 2017: four-year-old season ===
After an absence of over ten months, Persuaive returned in the Group 1 Prix Rothschild over 1600 metres at Deauville Racecourse on 30 July 2017 and finished fifth of the ten runners behind Roly Poly, Via Ravenna, Siyoushake and Qemah. On 9 September at Leopardstown she ran for the second time in the Matron Stakes and came home strongly to take third place behind Hydrangea and Winter with Wuheida, Qemah, Roly Poly and Rhododendron finishing behind. At Newmarket Racecourse on 7 October the filly started favourite for the Group 1 Sun Chariot Stakes but was beaten into second place by Roly Poly.

Two weeks after her defeat in the Sun Chariot Stakes, Persuasive was matched against male opposition for the first time in the Queen Elizabeth II Stakes on soft ground at Ascot. Ribchester started favourite ahead of Churchill, Beat the Bank (Joel Stakes) and Al Wukair (Prix Jacques Le Marois) with Persuasive next in the betting at 8/1. The other ten runners included Thunder Snow, Here Comes When (Sussex Stakes), Lightning Spear (Celebration Mile), Breton Rock (Lennox Stakes) and Lancaster Bomber. Dettori positioned the filly towards the rear of the field before witching her to the outside to make a challenge in the straight. She took the lead a furlong from the finish and won by a length from Ribchester, with Churchill half a length away in third, becoming the first four-year-old filly to take the race since Rose Bowl in 1976. Following the filly's win Gosden said "It never worries me taking the colts on late in the year with a filly. I think they go through hell through the spring into the summer, coming into season and out of season, and hormonally they are a bit like a boy growing up. Then when they come to late summer and autumn everything is settled and they can focus on racing... She's a very good filly and I'm thrilled with her. We've waited for this ground as she loves it. She deserves it."

In 2018, Persuasive's owners Cheveley Park Stud decided to retire her from racing and at the beginning of her breeding career she was sent to the Frankel for her first cover.

== Pedigree ==
Pedigree of Persuasive (IRE), grey mare, 2014
Sire Dark Angel (IRE) 2005	Acclamation (GB); 1999	Royal Applause	Waajib
Sire Dark Angel (IRE) 2005	Acclamation (GB); 1999	Royal Applause	Flying Melody
Sire Dark Angel (IRE) 2005	Acclamation (GB); 1999	Princess Athena	Ahonoora
Sire Dark Angel (IRE) 2005	Acclamation (GB); 1999	Princess Athena	Shopping Wise
Sire Dark Angel (IRE) 2005	Midnight Angel (GB); 1994	Machiavellian	Mr. Prospector
Sire Dark Angel (IRE) 2005	Midnight Angel (GB); 1994	Machiavellian	Coup de Folie
Sire Dark Angel (IRE) 2005	Midnight Angel (GB); 1994	Night at Sea	Night Shift
Sire Dark Angel (IRE) 2005	Midnight Angel (GB); 1994	Night at Sea	Into Harbour
Dam Choose Me (IRE) 2006	Choisir (AUS); 1999	Danehill Dancer	Danehill
Dam Choose Me (IRE) 2006	Choisir (AUS); 1999	Danehill Dancer	Mira Adonde
Dam Choose Me (IRE) 2006	Choisir (AUS); 1999	Great Selection	Lunchtime
Dam Choose Me (IRE) 2006	Choisir (AUS); 1999	Great Selection	Pensive Mood
Dam Choose Me (IRE) 2006	Hecuba (GB); 2000	Hector Protector	Woodman
Dam Choose Me (IRE) 2006	Hecuba (GB); 2000	Hector Protector	Korveya
Dam Choose Me (IRE) 2006	Hecuba (GB); 2000	Ajuga	The Minstrel
Dam Choose Me (IRE) 2006	Hecuba (GB); 2000	Ajuga	Cairn Rouge (Family:1-l)
