= Giant's Causeway Stakes =

Annual horse race in Lexington, Kentucky

- Class: Grade II
- Location: Keeneland Race Course; Lexington, Kentucky, United States
- Inaugurated: 1998 (as the Spinning World Stakes)
- Race type: Thoroughbred – Flat racing
- Website: Keeneland

Race information
- Distance: 5 1/2 furlongs
- Surface: Turf
- Track: left-handed
- Qualification: Fillies & mares, three years old & older
- Weight: Base weights with allowances: 4-year-olds and up: 126 lbs. 3-year-olds: 120 lbs.
- Purse: US$350,000 (since 2025)

The Giant's Causeway Stakes is a Grade II American Thoroughbred horse race for fillies and mares, age three and older, over a distance of 5 1/2 furlongs (1100 meters) held annually in April at Keeneland Race Course in Lexington, Kentucky. The event currently offers a purse of $350,000.

== History ==
In the inaugural running of the event was as the Spinning World Stakes on April 19, 1998, and the winner was the Irish-bred three-year-old filly Golden Mirage who was ridden by jockey Willie Martinez and won by three-quarters of a length in a time of 1:03.81.

Spinning World was a Three-Year-Old Champion in Ireland in 1996 and Champion Older Horse in France in 1997. In 1997 Spinning World won the Breeders' Cup Mile at Hollywood Park.

The second running of event was run in two divisions.

For the third running of the event, the race was renamed to the Stravinsky Stakes. Stravinsky was an American-bred, Irish-trained horse who won two Group 1 sprint races in England, the July Cup and the Nunthorpe Stakes.

In 2000 the winner Steal A Heart set a new track record for the 5 1/2 furlongs distance of 1:02.47 and the following year Confessional won in the same time equaling the track record.

The event was renamed to the current name Giant's Causeway Stakes in 2006. The event was named after Giant's Causeway, an American-bred, Irish-trained racehorse who won five Group One races in Britain and Ireland as a three-year-old in 2000. Upon retirement Giant's Causeway stood one season at Coolmore Stud in Ireland before relocating to Coolmore's United States branch Ashford Stud in Versailles, Kentucky. Giant's Causeway was a Leading sire in North America in 2009, 2010 and 2012 and a Leading broodmare sire in North America in 2018.

The running of the event in 2011 was moved off the turf. In 2020 due to the COVID-19 pandemic in the United States, Keeneland did not schedule the event in their updated and shortened summer meeting.

In 2024 the event was upgraded by the Thoroughbred Owners and Breeders Association to a Grade III. The event would be upgraded again to Grade II in 2026.

== Records ==
Speed record

- 5 1/2 furlongs: 1:01.74 – Twilight Gleaming (IRE) (2023)

Margins

- 4 3/4 lengths (950 meters) – West Ocean (2010)

Most wins by a jockey

- 4 – Irad Ortiz Jr. (2017, 2022, 2023, 2024)

Most wins by a trainer

- 4 – Wesley A. Ward (2011, 2017, 2022, 2023)

Most wins by an owner

- 3 – Stonestreet Stables (2017, 2022, 2023)

== Winners ==
Year	Winner	Age	Jockey	Trainer	Owner	Distance	Time	Purse	Grade	Ref
Spinning World Stakes
1998	Golden Mirage (IRE)	3	Willie Martinez	Josie Carroll	James & Alice Sapara	5 1/2 furlongs	1:03.81	$55,000	Listed	
1999	Storm Alert	4	Francisco Torres	George R. Arnold II	G. Watts Humphrey Jr.	5 1/2 furlongs	1:02.62	$68,250	Listed	Division 2
1999	Ayrial Delight	7	Randy Romero	Ronald J. Taylor	Dwight M. Mentzer	5 1/2 furlongs	1:02.62	$58,750	Listed	Division 1
Stravinsky Stakes
2000	Steal A Heart	5	Robby Albarado	Alice Cohn	Jeffrey S. Amling	5 1/2 furlongs	1:02.47	$72,000	Listed	
2001	Confessional	5	Edgar Prado	H. Graham Motion	Pin Oak Stable	5 1/2 furlongs	1:02.47	$84,150	Listed	
2002	Dianehill (IRE)	6	Pat Day	W. Elliott Walden	WinStar Farm	5 1/2 furlongs	1:03.41	$84,900	Listed	
2003	Repository	5	Jerry D. Bailey	D. Wayne Lukas	Rafter L Stables	5 1/2 furlongs	1:03.29	$84,375	Listed	
2004	Dyna Da Wyna	4	Pat Day	W. Elliott Walden	WinStar Farm	5 1/2 furlongs	1:02.63	$85,575	Listed	
2005	Tara's Touch (SAF)	6	Mike E. Smith	Niall O'Callaghan	Team Valor Stables & Margaux Farm	5 1/2 furlongs	1:04.52	$114,700	Listed	
Giant's Causeway Stakes
2006	Gilded Gold	5	Javier Castellano	Alan E. Goldberg	Bobby Flay, Robert E. Masterson & Barry L. Weisbord	5 1/2 furlongs	1:02.81	$114,600	Listed	
2007	Forest Code	4	Garrett Gomez	Todd A. Pletcher	Blyar Stable	5 1/2 furlongs	1:02.73	$115,000	Listed	
2008	Danceroftherealm (GB)	5	Miguel Mena	Malcolm Pierce	Richard L. Lister	5 1/2 furlongs	1:03.33	$100,000	Listed	
2009	Diamondrella (GB)	5	Rajiv Maragh	Angel A. Penna Jr.	Castletop Stable	5 1/2 furlongs	1:02.71	$100,000	Listed	
2010	West Ocean	4	Javier Castellano	Todd A. Pletcher	Wertheimer et Frère	5 1/2 furlongs	1:02.23	$100,000	Listed	
2011	Holiday for Kitten	3	Juan Delgado	Wesley A. Ward	Kenneth L. and Sarah K. Ramsey	5 1/2 furlongs	1:02.78	$100,000	Listed	Off turf
2012	Flash Mash	4	Brian Hernandez Jr.	Michael Stidham	Prime Equestrian SARL	5 1/2 furlongs	1:03.19	$100,000	Listed	
2013	Sweet Cassiopeia	5	Joseph Rocco Jr.	William Connelly	Dan Considine & Steve C. Snowden	5 1/2 furlongs	1:03.07	$100,000	Listed	
2014	Ageless	5	Julien Leparoux	Arnaud Delacour	Lael Stables	5 1/2 furlongs	1:03.18	$100,000	Listed	
2015	Katie's Eyes	4	Florent Geroux	Michael Stidham	Ike & Dawn Thrash, Janet & Sam Alley	5 1/2 furlongs	1:02.78	$100,000	Listed	
2016	Exaggerated	4	Julien Leparoux	Arnaud Delacour	Lael Stables	5 1/2 furlongs	1:02.81	$100,000	Listed	
2017	Lady Aurelia	3	John R. Velazquez	Wesley A. Ward	Stonestreet Stables, George Bolton & Peter Leidel	5 1/2 furlongs	1:02.40	$100,000	Listed	
2018	Triple Chelsea	5	Adam Beschizza	Joe Sharp	Brad Grady	5 1/2 furlongs	1:02.40	$100,000	Listed	
2019	Morticia	5	Irad Ortiz Jr.	George R. Arnold II	G. Watts Humphrey Jr.	5 1/2 furlongs	1:03.18	$100,000	Listed	
2020	Race not held									
2021	Change of Control	5	Colby Hernandez	Michelle Lovell	Horseshoe Racing	5 1/2 furlongs	1:04.48	$100,000	Listed	
2022	Campanelle (IRE)	4	Irad Ortiz Jr.	Wesley A. Ward	Stonestreet Stables	5 1/2 furlongs	1:01.98	$162,475	Listed	
2023	Twilight Gleaming (IRE)	4	Irad Ortiz Jr.	Wesley A. Ward	Stonestreet Stables	5 1/2 furlongs	1:01.74	$214,650	Listed	
2024	Roses for Debra	4	Irad Ortiz Jr.	Christophe Clement	Cheyenne Stable & John O'Meara	5 1/2 furlongs	1:02.79	$260,713	III	
2025	Future Is Now	5	Paco Lopez	Michael J. Trombetta	The Estate of R. Larry Johnson	5 1/2 furlongs	1:02.72	$270,850	III	
2026	In Our Time	5	Flavien Prat	Saffie A. Joseph Jr.	Resolute Racing and Miller Racing	5 1/2 furlongs	1:02.17	$393,475	II	

Legend:
All Weather Track Turf

== See also ==
- List of American and Canadian Graded races
