= Imprudence (horse) =

French-bred Thoroughbred racehorse

- Sire: Canot
- Grandsire: Nino
- Dam: Indiscretion
- Damsire: Hurry On
- Sex: Mare
- Foaled: 1944
- Country: France
- Colour: Brown
- Breeder: Pierre Corbiere
- Owner: Mme Pierre Corbiere; Cain Hoy Stable
- Trainer: Joseph Lieux
- Record: 13: 6-3-0

Major wins
- Poule d'Essai des Pouliches (1947); 1000 Guineas (1947); Epsom Oaks (1947)

Honours
- Prix Imprudence at Maisons-Laffitte

Imprudence (1944 – 1967) was a French Thoroughbred racehorse and broodmare. She showed very promising form as a two-year-old in 1949 when she won two races and finished second in the Prix de la Salamandre. She reached her peak in the first half of the following year when she won the Poule d'Essai des Pouliches and the 1000 Guineas before recording an emphatic victory in the Epsom Oaks. She made little impact when competing in the United States as a four-year-old. She had some success as a broodmare.

== Background ==
Impudence was a brown mare with a small white star bred in France by Pierre Corbiere. She was sent into training with Joseph Lieux. The filly raced in the colours of Pierre Corbiere's wife.

She was sired by Canot who won the Critérium de Saint-Cloud and was placed in the Prix du Jockey Club, Grand Prix de Paris and Prix de l'Arc de Triomphe. Imprudence's dam, the British-bred Indiscretion was an influential broodmare whose other descendants included Definite Article, Rakti and Holding Court.

== Racing career ==
=== 1946: two-year-old season ===
As a two-year-old in 1946 Imprudence ran three times and won two races. She produced her best performance in defeat when she finished second to Catalina in the Prix de la Salamandre over 1400 metres at Longchamp Racecourse in September.

=== 1947: three-year-old season ===
Imprudence recorded her first major victory in April 1947 when she won the 1600 metre Poule d'Essai des Pouliches from Montenica and Djama. She was then sent to England to contest the 134th running of the 1000 Guineas over the Rowley Mile at Newmarket Racecourse on 2 May and stated the 4/1 favourite in a 20-runner field. Ridden by the Australian jockey Rae Johnstone she won by a neck and a head from Rose o' Lynn and Wild Child.

Imprudence was back in England on 5 June and, with Johnstone again in the saddle, started the 7/4 favourite for the 169th Oaks Stakes over one and a half miles at Epsom Racecourse. Wild Child was again in opposition but the best fancied of her the opponents were Solpax (Lingfield Oaks Trial), Mermaid and Netherton Maid (Princess Elizabeth Stakes). Imprudence came home five lengths clear of Netherton Maid, with two lengths back to Mermaid in third.

In August Imprudence was matched against older horses in the Prix Jacques Le Marois over 1600 metres at Deauville Racecourse and finished second to the Prix Lupin winner Djelal.

=== 1948: four-year-old season ===
In 1948 Imprudence was bought by Harry Frank Guggenheim and sent to the United States where she raced in the colours of Cain Hoy Stable and was known as Imprudence II. She failed to win in five starts, producing her best effort when second to Camargo in the Molly Pitcher Stakes on 31 July at Monmouth Park.

== Assessment and honours ==
In their book, A Century of Champions, based on the Timeform rating system, John Randall and Tony Morris rated Imprudence an "average" winner of the 1000 Guineas and an "inferior" winner of the Oaks.

The Prix Imprudence run at Maisons-Laffitte, is named in her honour.

== Breeding record ==
Impudence was retired from racing to become a broodmare in the United States. She produced at least nine foals and four winners between 1951 and 1967:

- Hot Pursuit, a chestnut colt (later gelded), foaled in 1951, sired by Requested. Winner
- Peccadillo, brown filly, 1952, Nasrullah. Female-line ancestor of Bakharoff.
- Full Thrust, brown filly, 1954, by Count Fleet
- Wayward Miss, brown filly, 1956, by Nasrullah. Winner
- Silent Wind, bay filly, 1957, by Ambiorix
- Naughty Naughty, bay filly, 1960, by Ambiorix. Winner
- Dark Hussy, filly, 1961, by Dark Star
- Ribots Fling, brown colt, 1962, by Ribot. Winner
- Tiny Warrior, chestnut filly, 1967, by Armageddon

Imprudence died in 1967.

== Pedigree ==
Pedigree of Imprudence (FR), brown mare, 1944
Sire Canot (FR) 1935	Nino; 1923	Clarissimus (GB)	Radium
Sire Canot (FR) 1935	Nino; 1923	Clarissimus (GB)	Quintessence
Sire Canot (FR) 1935	Nino; 1923	Azalee	Ajax
Sire Canot (FR) 1935	Nino; 1923	Azalee	Lygie
Sire Canot (FR) 1935	Canalette; 1922	Cannobie (GB)	Polymelus
Sire Canot (FR) 1935	Canalette; 1922	Cannobie (GB)	La Roche
Sire Canot (FR) 1935	Canalette; 1922	Hallebarde	Admirable Crichton (IRE)
Sire Canot (FR) 1935	Canalette; 1922	Hallebarde	Membrilla (IRE)
Dam Indiscretion (GB) 1932	Hurry On; 1913	Marcovil	Marco
Dam Indiscretion (GB) 1932	Hurry On; 1913	Marcovil	Lady Villikins
Dam Indiscretion (GB) 1932	Hurry On; 1913	Tout Suite	Sainfoin
Dam Indiscretion (GB) 1932	Hurry On; 1913	Tout Suite	Star
Dam Indiscretion (GB) 1932	Brig o'Dee; 1926	Bridge of Earn	Cyllene
Dam Indiscretion (GB) 1932	Brig o'Dee; 1926	Bridge of Earn	Santa Brigida
Dam Indiscretion (GB) 1932	Brig o'Dee; 1926	Black Gem	Black Jester
Dam Indiscretion (GB) 1932	Brig o'Dee; 1926	Black Gem	Lady Brilliant (Family 22-d)
