= Hibaayeb =

British-bred Thoroughbred racehorse

- Racing silks of Mohammed Al Nabouda and Godolphin
- Sire: Singspiel
- Grandsire: In the Wings
- Dam: Lady Zonda
- Damsire: Lion Cavern
- Sex: Mare
- Foaled: 20 April 2007
- Country: United Kingdom
- Colour: Dark Bay or Brown
- Breeder: Rabbah Bloodstock Limited
- Owner: Mohammed Al Nabouda; Godolphin Racing
- Trainer: Clive Brittain; Saeed bin Suroor
- Record: 15: 4-2-4
- Earnings: £402,638

Major wins
- Fillies' Mile (2009); Ribblesdale Stakes (2010); Yellow Ribbon Stakes (2010); Sheepshead Bay Stakes (2011)

Hibaayeb (foaled 20 April 2007) is a British Thoroughbred racehorse and broodmare. As a two-year-old in 2009, when trained by Clive Brittain, she was beaten in her first three races before winning the Group One Fillies' Mile at Ascot Racecourse. In the following year she entered the Godolphin stable and recorded further major victories in the Ribblesdale Stakes in England and the Yellow Ribbon Stakes in California. As a four-year-old she was based in the United States and won the Sheepshead Bay Stakes at Belmont Park.

== Background ==
Hibaayeb is a dark bay mare with a small white star bred in the United Kingdom by Rabbah Bloodstock Limited. She was sired by Singspiel, an international campaigner whose wins included the Canadian International Stakes, Japan Cup, Dubai World Cup, Coronation Cup, and International Stakes. The best of his other progeny include Moon Ballad, Solow and Dar Re Mi. Hibaayeb's dam Lady Zonda showed moderate ability as a racehorse, winning two minor races from twelve starts as a three-year-old in 2002. She was a great-granddaughter of Oh So Fair, an influential broodmare whose other descendants have included Oh So Sharp, Shantou, Collier Hill, Roussalka and Ameerat.

The filly was owned in the early part of her racing career by Mohammed Al Nabouda and was initially sent into training with Clive Brittain at Carlburg Stables in Newmarket.

== Racing career ==
=== 2009: two-year-old season ===
On her racecourse debut, Hibaayeb started a 16/1 outsider for a seven furlong maiden race at Newmarket Racecourse on 8 August and finished third behind Eolith and Pollenator. Two weeks later she started second favourite for a similar event at Folkestone Racecourse and was ridden on her debut by Philip Robinson. She took the lead inside the final furlong but was caught in the final strides and beaten a neck by the Henry Cecil-trained Creese. Despite being beaten in her first two races the filly was stepped up in class and distance for the Group Two May Hill Stakes over one mile at Doncaster Racecourse on 11 September and started the 40/1 outsider of the seven runners. Ridden for the first time by Neil Callan she stayed on strongly in the closing stages and finished second, half a length behind Pollenator and a length in front of the odds-on favourite Seta.

Callan was again in the saddle fifteen days later when the filly was moved up in class again for the Group One Fillies' Mile at Ascot Racecourse. The Sweet Solera Stakes winner Long Lashes started favourite ahead of the Aidan O'Brien-trained You'll Be Mine and the Star Stakes winner Mudaaraah with Hibaayeb next in the betting on 8/1 alongside the Prestige Stakes winner Sent From Heaven. The other four runners were Lady Darshaan (third in the Cherry Hinton Stakes), Chantilly Creme, winner of the Listed Criterium du Bequet in France and the maiden winners Blue Angel and Dyna Waltz. Callan tracked the leaders before squeezing the filly through a gap on the inside rail to take the lead inside the final furlong. In a rough finish, Hibaayeb hung to the left in the closing stages before prevailing by three quarters of a length from Lady Darshaan with You'll Be Mine a length and a half away in third place. After a stewards' inquiry, the result was allowed to stand, despite the fact that Callan had accidentally struck the runner-up across the face with his whip. Callan commented "I was always pretty confident. I got a lovely run, she stretched away and quickened away like she was going to win by a couple of lengths, but she's pricked her ears. She's just come off a line a little bit but I've done everything I could". Brittain said "Not many people try to win a group I with a maiden, but in my eyes she had already run two races that she could have won... She is progressing, which is the most important thing, but I don't want to gallop her into the ground. She has got a future and could go to America. I will have to talk to the owners, but it will depend on the filly; it is easier listening to animals as they tell you more than people".

At the end of the year, Hibaayeb was taken into the ownership of Godolphin and transferred to the stable of Saeed bin Suroor.

=== 2010: three-year-old season ===
In 2010, Hibaayeb was ridden in seven of her eight races by Frankie Dettori. On her first appearance of the season the filly contested the 197th running of the 1000 Guineas over the Rowley Mile at Newmarket Racecourse on 2 May and started at odds of 12/1. After racing down the centre of the wide course she weakened and was eased down by Dettori to finish sixteenth of the seventeen runners. She was then sent to France and moved up in distance for the Group One Prix Saint-Alary over 2000 metres at Longchamp Racecourse on 23 May. She led for most of the way but was overtaken in the straight and finished third behind Sarafina and Deluxe. On 17 June the filly was again moved up in distance for the Group Two Ribblesdale Stakes over one and a half miles at Royal Ascot and started 4/1 joint-favourite alongside Principal Role, a filly who had won the Fillies' Trial Stakes in May. Her connections had opted to bypass The Oaks, feeling that the filly would benefit from a longer break between races. The best fancied of the other nine runners were Gertrude Bell (Cheshire Oaks) and Middle Club (Prix d'Aumale). Dettori settled the filly in the middle of the field as the outsider Acquainted set the pace, before switching to the outside approaching the final turn. Hibaayeb took the lead in the last quarter mile drew clear of her opponents and won by three and three quarter lengths from the Michael Stoute-trained Eldalil with the outsider Gallic Star three quarter lengths away in third. Dettori said that the filly "relished the extra trip and everything was perfect".

A month after her win at Ascot, Hibaayeb was sent to Ireland to contest the Irish Oaks at the Curragh. She was reported as being "in the form of her life" in the build-up to the race and started the 100/30 favourite but made no impact and finished last of the fifteen runners behind Snow Fairy. Her next two races saw little improvement as she finished fourth when favourite for the Preis der Diana in Germany and seventh of eight behind Midday in the Yorkshire Oaks on 19 August. The filly was then sent to the United States to contest the Grade I Yellow Ribbon Stakes over one and a quarter miles at Hollywood Park Racetrack on 2 October in which she was ridden by Rafael Bejarano. Her opponents included the South African mare Gypsy's Warning, the Beverly Hills Handicap winner Turning Top and the Osunitas Stakes winner Lilly Fa Pootz. Hibaayed recovered from a slow start to move up into third place behind Gypsy's Warning but was forced to the wide outside approaching the final turn. She finished strongly to take the lead 150 yards from the finish and won by a length from Turning Top. Bejarano commented "At the three-eighths I knew I had a lot of horse and I just let her go. It was a perfect trip and I had a lot of confidence". On her final appearance of the year, Hibaayeb started a 25/1 outsider for the Breeders' Cup Filly & Mare Turf at Churchill Downs and finished eighth of the eleven runners behind Shared Account.

=== 2011: four-year-old season ===
Hibaayeb remained in the United States for the 2011 season and was ridden in all three of her races by John R. Velazquez. After finishing third in an allowance race at Gulfstream Park in April she was moved up in class for the Grade II Sheepshead Bay Stakes over eleven furlongs at Belmont Park on 28 May. Starting the 1.95/1 favourite against five opponents she won by a length and a neck from Giant's Play and Cheetah. Her assistant trainer Rick Mettee said "It's one of the races where she pulled the ultimate perfect trip", assistant trainer said. "Once she got up the inside, as slow as they were going, it was going to be hard to outfinish her off those fractions... It was a pretty straightforward race". Four weeks later the filly started favourite for the New York Stakes over ten furlongs at the same track but finished third of the six runners behind Giant's Play and Zagora.

== Breeding record ==
Hibaayeb was retired from racing to become a broodmare. To date she has produced one named foal:

- Lacey's Lane, a bay filly, foaled in 2013, sired by Street Cry
- Wuheida, chestnut filly, 2014, by Dubawi. Won Prix Marcel Boussac, Breeders' Cup Filly & Mare Turf.

== Pedigree ==
Pedigree of Hibaayeb, dark bay or brown mare, 2007
Sire Singspiel (IRE) 1992	In the Wings (GB); 1986	Sadler's Wells	Northern Dancer
Sire Singspiel (IRE) 1992	In the Wings (GB); 1986	Sadler's Wells	Fairy Bridge
Sire Singspiel (IRE) 1992	In the Wings (GB); 1986	High Hawk	Shirley Heights
Sire Singspiel (IRE) 1992	In the Wings (GB); 1986	High Hawk	Sunbittern
Sire Singspiel (IRE) 1992	Glorious Song (CAN); 1976	Halo	Hail To Reason
Sire Singspiel (IRE) 1992	Glorious Song (CAN); 1976	Halo	Cosmah
Sire Singspiel (IRE) 1992	Glorious Song (CAN); 1976	Ballade	Herbager
Sire Singspiel (IRE) 1992	Glorious Song (CAN); 1976	Ballade	Miss Swapsco
Dam Lady Zonda (GB) 1999	Lion Cavern (USA); 1989	Mr. Prospector	Raise a Native
Dam Lady Zonda (GB) 1999	Lion Cavern (USA); 1989	Mr. Prospector	Gold Digger
Dam Lady Zonda (GB) 1999	Lion Cavern (USA); 1989	Secrettame	Secretariat
Dam Lady Zonda (GB) 1999	Lion Cavern (USA); 1989	Secrettame	Tamerett
Dam Lady Zonda (GB) 1999	Zonda (GB); 1988	Fabulous Dancer	Northern Dancer
Dam Lady Zonda (GB) 1999	Zonda (GB); 1988	Fabulous Dancer	Last of the Line
Dam Lady Zonda (GB) 1999	Zonda (GB); 1988	Oh So Hot	Habitat
Dam Lady Zonda (GB) 1999	Zonda (GB); 1988	Oh So Hot	Oh So Fair (Family: 9-c)

- Hibaayeb was inbred 4 × 4 to Northern Dancer, meaning that this stallion appears twice in the fourth generation of her pedigree.
