= 2010 1000 Guineas =

197th 1000 Guineas Stakes
- 1000 Guineas
- Location: Newmarket Racecourse
- Date: 2 May 2010
- Winning horse: Special Duty (GB)
- Jockey: Stéphane Pasquier
- Trainer: Criquette Head-Maarek (FR)
- Owner: Khalid Abdulla

The 2010 1000 Guineas Stakes was a horse race held at Newmarket Racecourse on Sunday, May 2010. It was the 197th running of the 1000 Guineas.

The winner was Khalid Abdulla's Special Duty, a three-year-old chestnut filly trained at Chantilly in France by Criquette Head-Maarek and ridden by Stéphane Pasquier. The Henry Cecil-trained Jacqueline Quest finished first by a nose but the placings of the first two finisher were reversed after a stewards' inquiry. Special Duty's victory was the first in the race for Pasquier and the fourth in the race for Head-Maarek after Ma Biche (1982), Ravinella (1988) and Hatoof (1992). Khalid Abdulla had previously won the race with Wince in 1999.

== The contenders ==
The race attracted a field of seventeen runners: fourteen trained in the United Kingdom, two in Ireland and one in France. The favourite was the only French challenger, Special Duty, who had been voted the European Champion Two-Year-Old Filly of 2009 when she had won the Prix Robert Papin and the Cheveley Park Stakes Ireland was represented by the Aidan O'Brien-trained Devoted To You and the Jim Bolger-trained Gile Na Greine, neither of whom had won a Group race. The British runners included Rumoush, who had defeated colts in the Feilden Stakes, Music Show (Rockfel Stakes, Nell Gwyn Stakes), Pollenator (May Hill Stakes), Misheer (Cherry Hinton Stakes) and Hibaayeb (Fillies' Mile) as well as the lightly-raced, but highly regarded Seta. One of the two complete outsiders, starting at odds of 66/1, was Jacqueline Quest, whose only win had come in a maiden race at Chester Racecourse. Special Duty headed the betting at odds of 9/2 ahead of Seta (13/2) with Music Show and Rumoush at 7/1, Pollenator on 8/1 and four other fillies at 12/1 or less in a very open-looking race.

== The race ==
Soon after leaving the starting stalls, the fillies split into two groups on the wide straight course: one group ran up the centre of the track, whilst the other raced along the stands side rail (on the left from the jockeys' viewpoint). Sent From Heaven took the lead on the stands side from Gile Na Greine and Jacqueline Quest with Special Duty towards the rear, whilst Nurture led the centre group with Pollenator, Misheer and Rumoush close behind. Approaching the final quarter mile, Music Show went to the front of the centre group, but it became apparent that the runners on the stand side had a clear advantage, with Jacqueline Quest taking the lead from Gile Na Greine and Special Duty. Inside the final furlong, Jacqueline Quest maintained a slight advantage but veered sharply to the right, carrying Special Duty over to the centre of the course. The photo-finish showed Jacqueline Quest the winner by a nose from Special Duty with Gile Na Greine and Sent From Heaven, both of whom had continued to race along the rail, a short-head and half a length away in third and fourth. The 66/1 outsider Distinctive came next ahead of Music Show, the best finisher of those who had raced down the centre. The racecourse stewards immediately called an inquiry and reversed the placings of the first two finishers, ruling that Jacqueline Quest's interference had prevented Special Duty from winning the race. Jacqueline Quest's trainer Henry Cecil admitted that the decision was "probably" a fair one.

== Race details ==
- Sponsor: Stan James
- First prize: £227,080
- Surface: Turf
- Going: Good to Soft
- Distance: 8 furlongs
- Number of runners: 17
- Winner's time: 1:39.66

== Results ==
Pos.	Marg.	Horse (bred)	Jockey	Trainer (Country)	Odds
1		Special Duty (GB)	Stéphane Pasquier	Criquette Head-Maarek (FR)	9/2 fav
2	nse	Jacqueline Quest (IRE)	Tom Queally	Henry Cecil (GB)	66/1
3	hd	Gile Na Greine (IRE)	Kevin Manning	Jim Bolger (IRE)	25/1
4	½	Sent From Heaven (IRE)	Michael Hills	Barry Hills (GB)	33/1
5	5	Distinctive (GB)	Tom Eaves	Bryan Smart (GB)	66/1
6	¾	Music Show (IRE)	Ryan Moore	Mick Channon (GB)	7/1
7	¾	Rumoush (USA)	Michael Hills	Marcus Tregoning (GB)	7/1
8	4	Habaayib (GB)	Tadhg O'Shea	Ed Dunlop (GB)	40/1
9	1¾	Blue Maiden (GB)	Jamie Spencer	Philip McBride (GB)	12/1
10	2¼	Lady Darshaan (IRE)	William Buick	J. S. Moore (GB)	25/1
11	5	Pollenator (IRE)	Richard Hughes	Richard Hannon (GB)	8/1
12	1	Seta (GB)	Kieren Fallon	Luca Cumani (GB)	13/2
13	2½	Pipette (GB)	Jimmy Fortune	Andrew Balding (GB)	12/1
14	3¼	Nurture (IRE)	Jim Crowley	Ralph Beckett (GB)	40/1
15	3½	Devoted To You (IRE)	Johnny Murtagh	Aidan O'Brien (IRE)	11/1
16	shd	Hibaayeb (GB)	Frankie Dettori	Saeed bin Suroor (GB)	12/1
17	11	Misheer (GB)	Neil Callan	Clive Brittain (GB)	28/1

- Abbreviations: nse = nose; nk = neck; shd = head; hd = head; dist = distance; UR = unseated rider; DSQ = disqualified

== Winner's details ==
Further details of the winner, Special Duty

- Foaled: 12 February 2007
- Country: United Kingdom
- Sire: Hennessy; Dam: Quest To Peak (Distant View)
- Owner: Khalid Abdulla
- Breeder: Juddmonte Farms
