= Sandringham Handicap =

Sandringham Stakes
- Class: Class 2
- Location: Ascot Racecourse; Ascot, England
- Race type: Flat / Thoroughbred
- Website: Ascot

Race information
- Distance: 1 mile (1,609 metres)
- Surface: Turf
- Track: Straight
- Qualification: Three-year-old fillies
- Weight: Handicap
- Purse: £60,000 (2020); 1st: £38,814

Sandringham Stakes
2026
Green Carrera	Symbol Of Majesty	Rosa Inglesa

Previous years
2025
Never Let Go	Cajole	Tabiti
2024
Soprano	Strutting	Uluru
2023
Coppice	Breege	Balalaika
2022
Heredia	Zanbaq	Crenelle
2021
Create Belief	Samoot	Messidor

2020-2011
2020
Onassis	Waliyak	Dubai Love
2019
Thanks Be	Magnetic Charm	Hotsy Totsy
2018
Agrotera	Ortiz	Escape The City
2017
Con Te Partiro	Rain Goddess	Paco's Angel
2016
Persuasive	Diamond Fields	Sharaakah
2015
Osaila	Always Smile	Touchline
2014
Muteela	Queen Catrine	Wee Jean
2013
Annecdote	Auction	Woodland Aria
2012
Duntle	Arsaadi	Ladys First
2011
Rhythm Of Light	Dubai Queen	Winter's Night

2010-2001
2010
Timepiece	Blue Maiden	Safina
2009
Moneycantbuymelove	Golden Stream	Please Sing
2008
Festivale	Illusion	Shabiba
2007
Barshiba	Selinka	Costume
2006
Red Evie	La Mottie	Makderah
2005
Beautyandthebeast	Borthwick Girl	Bon Nuit
2004
Celtic Heroine	Coy	Zosima
2003
Hold To Ransom	Sharplaw Venture	Chic
2002
Tashawak	Chorist	Reefs Sis
2001
Independence	Dear Daughter	Love Everlasting

2000-1991
2000
Papabile	Mystify	Coco
1999
Holly Blue	Ma-Arif	Insinuate
1998
Fizzed	Equity Princess	Final Tango
1997
Brave Kris	Dancing Drop	Atlantic Desire
1996
Dawna	Miss Riviera	Medieval Lady
1995
Cask	Royal Rebuke	Western Reel
1994
Palana	Bintalshaati	Reason To Dance
1993
Barboukh	Forthwith	Fabriana
1992
Calpella	Nashville Blues	Louisville Belle
1991
Princess Tara	Elfaslah	Bridal Train

1990-1988
1990
My Shafy	Flying Diva	Dara Dee
1989
Minstrel Guest	Racing Home	Actress
1988
Storm Kitty	Farewell Song	Constant Companion

The Sandringham Stakes is a flat handicap horse race in Great Britain open to three-year-old fillies. It is run at Ascot over a distance of 1 mile (1,609 metres), and it is scheduled to take place each year in June on the fourth day of the Royal Ascot meeting. The race was called the Fern Hill Rated Stakes until 2001, and was part of the Ascot Heath meeting held on the Saturday after Royal Ascot. Prior to 2018 it was run as a Listed handicap but was downgraded by the British Horseracing Authority to comply with a new rule that no handicap race could carry Listed or Group race status.

== Winners ==
Year	Winner	Weight	Jockey	Trainer	Time
1971	Abandoned due to waterlogging
1972	Gold Roulette	8-01	Ernie Johnson	Barry Hills	1:44.27
1973	Pantomime	8-00	Philip Waldron	Ian Balding	1:43.26
1974	Ouija	8-05	Willie Carson	Bernard van Cutsem	1:39.75
1975	Welsh Pearl	9-00	Philip Waldron	Henry Candy	1:43.99
1976	Fall To Pieces	8-07	Pat Eddery	Peter Walwyn	1:45.38
1977	Apple Peel	7-10	Willie Carson	William Hastings-Bass	1:44.05
1978	Water Frolic	8-01	Frankie Durr	Henry Cecil	1:45.93
1979	Strathspey	9-00	Greville Starkey	Ian Balding	1:43.00
1980	Trevita	9-06	Paul Cook	Harry Thomson Jones	1:43.81
1981	Oh So Choosy	8-11	Shaun Payne	Ian Balding	1:42.11
1982	Kareena	9-03	John Reid	Fulke Johnson Houghton	1:45.70
1983	Gaygo Lady	8-12	Steve Cauthen	Barry Hills	1:40.60
1984	Verchinina	7-07	Richard Fox	Barry Hills	1:42.15
1985	Russell Creek	7-08	Richard Lines	Charles Booth	1:46.24
1986	Vianora	9-02	Greville Starkey	Guy Harwood	1:39.93
1987	Lashing	8-04	Ray Cochrane	Luca Cumani	1:49.11
1988	Storm Kitty	9-02	Ray Cochrane	Luca Cumani	1:48.58
1989	Minstrel Guest	8-04	Willie Carson	Peter Walwyn	1:42.34
1990	My Shafy	8-00	Michael Roberts	Ben Hanbury	1:43.74
1991	Princess Tara	8-02	Darryll Holland	Geoff Lewis	1:43.37
1992	Calpella	8-06	Michael Roberts	James Toller	1:40.42
1993	Barboukh	8-13	Pat Eddery	David Elsworth	1:47.50
1994	Palana	8-05	Frankie Dettori	Ian Balding	1:44.06
1995	Cask	8-06	Frankie Dettori	John Gosden	1:41.34
1996	Dawna	9-03	Pat Eddery	Henry Cecil	1:41.86
1997	Brave Kris	9-00	Frankie Dettori	Luca Cumani	1:45.93
1998	Fizzed	8-07	Michael Hills	Mark Johnston	1:41.52
1999	Holly Blue	8-08	Richard Hughes	Roger Charlton	1:41.85
2000	Papabile	8-11	Pat Eddery	William Jarvis	1:42.87
2001	Independence	8-07	Frankie Dettori	Ed Dunlop	1:40.07
2002	Tashawak	9-07	Richard Hills	John Dunlop	1:40.90
2003	Hold To Ransom	9-07	Frankie Dettori	Ed Dunlop	1:38.66
2004	Celtic Heroine	8-07	Kevin Darley	Michael Jarvis	1:40.10
2005	Beautyandthebeast	8-11	Mick Kinane	John Oxx	1:39.10
2006	Red Evie	8-12	Jamie Spencer	Michael Bell	1:41.35
2007	Barshiba	8-08	Richard Quinn	David Elsworth	1:40.22
2008	Festivale	9-01	Kerrin McEvoy	John Dunlop	1:40.75
2009	Moneycantbuymelove	8-11	Jamie Spencer	Michael Bell	1:41.89
2010	Timepiece	9-05	Tom Queally	Henry Cecil	1:38.53
2011	Rhythm Of Light	8-12	Richard Kingscote	Tom Dascombe	1:39.93
2012	Duntle	9-02	Wayne Lordan	David Wachman	1:37.90
2013	Annecdote	8-07	Richard Kingscote	Jonathan Portman	1:38.34
2014	Muteela	8-13	Paul Hanagan	Mark Johnston	1:37.93
2015	Osaila	9-07	Frankie Dettori	Richard Hannon Jr.	1:41.00
2016	Persuasive	8-09	Frankie Dettori	John Gosden	1:44.27
2017	Con Te Partiro	9-05	Jamie Spencer	Wesley Ward	1:38.84
2018	Agrotera	8-07	Jamie Spencer	Ed Walker	1:38.69
2019	Thanks Be	8-00	Hayley Turner	Charlie Fellowes	1:39.61
2020	Onassis	8-01	Hayley Turner	Charlie Fellowes	1:42.89
2021	Create Belief	9-02	Ben Coen	Johnny Murtagh	1:44.14
2022	Heredia	9-08	Sean Levey	Richard Hannon Jr.	1:39.62
2023	Coppice	9-03	Frankie Dettori	John & Thady Gosden	1:41.74
2024	Soprano	9-05	Billy Loughnane	George Boughey	1:40.75
2025	Never Let Go	8-10	Kieran Shoemark	Ed Walker	1:37.77
2026	Green Carrera	8-08	Mickael Barzalona	Joseph O'Brien	1:39.38

== See also ==
- Horse racing in Great Britain
- List of British flat horse races
