= Prix Imprudence =

Flat horse race in France

- Class: Group 3
- Location: Deauville; France
- Inaugurated: 1949
- Race type: Flat / Thoroughbred
- Website: france-galop.com

Race information
- Distance: 1,400 metres (7f)
- Surface: Turf
- Track: Straight
- Qualification: Three-year-old fillies
- Weight: 57 kg
- Purse: €80,000 (2019); 1st: €40,000

Prix Imprudence
2025
Better Together	Ghoufrann	Daylight

Previous years
2024
Romantic Style	Ramatuelle	Tamfana
2023
Showay	Ritournelle	Spirit Gal
2022
Malavath	Zellie	Accakaba
2021
Reina Madre	Sky Angel	Louliana

2020-2011
2019
Watch Me	Suphala	Jet Setteuse
2018
Coeur De Beaute	Zonza	Talbah
2017
Via Ravenna	Thais	Silver Storm
2016
Spectre	Midweek	Rosay
2015
Ervedya	Ameenah	Queen Bee
2014
Xcellence	Vorda	Dancing Sands
2013
What A Name	Holy Dazzle	Spinacre
2012
Mashoora	Belle De Lune	Nadeaud
2011
Moonlight Cloud	Helleborine	Miss Fifty

2010-2001
2010
Joanna	Evading Tempete	Special Duty
2009
Elusive Wave	Entre Deux Eaux	Only Green
2008
Natagora	Modern Look	Blue Cayenne
2007
Magic America	Winter Fashion	Beauty Is Truth
2006
Mauralakana	Mytographie	Kezia
2005
Valima	Toupie	Stella Blue
2004
Onda Nova	Dolma	Petit Calva
2003
Six Perfections	Campsie Fells	Derrianne
2002
Glia	Dedication	Zizoune
2001
Stunning	Hope Town	Snataka

2000-1991
2000
Peony	Lady Vettori	Bluemamba
1999
Blue Cloud	Ronda	Rangoon Ruby
1998
Cortona	Uninhibited	Nostalchia
1997
Pas De Reponse	Barnata	Psylla
1996
Mahalia	Rose Bourbon	Blushing Gleam
1995
Macoumba	Smolensk	Take Liberties
1994
Coup De Genie	Hasili	Zapata Beauty
1993
Wixon	Elizabeth Bay	Miss Elodie
1992
Kenbu	Hatoof	Plume Magique
1991
The Perfect Life	Divine Danse	Zanadiyka

1990-1987
1990
Cydalia	Sharp Sass	Pont Aven
1989
Lightning Fire	Girl of France	Puppet Dance
1988
Ravinella	Duckling Park	First Waltz
1987
Miesque	Grecian Urn	Musimara

The Prix Imprudence is a Group 3 flat horse race in France open to three-year-old thoroughbred fillies. It is run over a distance of 1,400 metres (about 7 furlongs) at Deauville in April.

== History ==
The event is named after Imprudence, a successful French-trained filly whose victories included three Classics in 1947. It was established in 1949, and was originally contested over a mile. It was cut to its present length in 1961.

For a period the Prix Imprudence held Listed status. It was promoted to Group 3 level in 2009. It is currently staged on the same day as the Prix Djebel, the equivalent race for colts.

The Prix Imprudence can serve as a trial for various fillies' Classics in Europe. The last winner to achieve victory in the 1,000 Guineas was Natagora in 2008 and the last to win the Poule d'Essai des Pouliches was Ervedya in 2015.

== Records ==
Leading jockey since 1979 (10 wins):

- Freddy Head – Ma Biche (1983), L'Orangerie (1984), Vilikaia (1985), Or Vision (1986), Miesque (1987), Lightning Fire (1989), Kenbu (1992), Macoumba (1995), Mahalia (1996), Pas de Reponse (1997)

Leading trainer since 1979 (10 wins):

- Criquette Head-Maarek – Ma Biche (1983), L'Orangerie (1984), Vilikaia (1985), Ravinella (1988), Macoumba (1995), Mahalia (1996), Pas de Reponse (1997), Cortona (1998), Stunning (2001), Magic America (2007)

Leading owner since 1979 (5 wins):

- Stavros Niarchos – Firyal (1980), Or Vision (1986), Miesque (1987), Lightning Fire (1989), Coup de Genie (1994)

== Winners since 1979 ==
Year	Winner	Jockey	Trainer	Owner	Time
1979	Pitasia	Alfred Gibert	Aage Paus	Sir Douglas Clague	1:37.00
1980	Firyal	Philippe Paquet	François Boutin	Stavros Niarchos
1981	Layalina	Alfred Gibert	Mitri Saliba	Mahmoud Fustok
1982	Play It Safe	Lester Piggott	François Boutin	Diana Firestone
1983	Ma Biche	Freddy Head	Criquette Head	Maktoum Al Maktoum
1984	L'Orangerie	Freddy Head	Criquette Head	Robert Sangster
1985	Vilikaia	Freddy Head	Criquette Head	Robert Sangster
1986	Or Vision	Freddy Head	François Boutin	Stavros Niarchos
1987	Miesque	Freddy Head	François Boutin	Stavros Niarchos	1:33.40
1988	Ravinella	Gary W. Moore	Criquette Head	Ecurie Aland	1:30.80
1989	Lightning Fire	Freddy Head	François Boutin	Stavros Niarchos
1990	Cydalia	Gérald Mossé	François Boutin	Ecurie Skymarc Farm
1991	The Perfect Life	Eric Saint-Martin	Robert Collet	Richard Strauss	1:25.70
1992	Kenbu	Freddy Head	François Boutin	Tomohiro Wada	1:27.90
1993	Wixon	Cash Asmussen	François Boutin	Allen Paulson	1:31.90
1994	Coup de Genie	Cash Asmussen	François Boutin	Stavros Niarchos	1:32.30
1995	Macoumba (Note: The 1995 and 1996 editions were run at Évry over 1,300 metres)	Freddy Head	Criquette Head	Haras d'Etreham	1:20.51
1996	Mahalia	Freddy Head	Criquette Head	Gerry Oldham	1:17.96
1997	Pas de Reponse	Freddy Head	Criquette Head	Wertheimer et Frère	1:30.90
1998	Cortona	Olivier Doleuze	Criquette Head	Gerry Oldham	1:36.00
1999	Blue Cloud	Olivier Peslier	André Fabre	Daniel Wildenstein	1:27.70
2000	Peony	Cash Asmussen	Dominique Sépulchre	Mrs John Moore	1:26.92
2001	Stunning (Note: The 2001 running was held at Longchamp)	Olivier Doleuze	Criquette Head-Maarek	Robert Clay	1:33.30
2002	Glia	Thierry Thulliez	Pascal Bary	Niarchos Family	1:27.30
2003	Six Perfections	Thierry Thulliez	Pascal Bary	Niarchos Family	1:29.40
2004	Onda Nova	Stéphane Pasquier	Dominique Sépulchre	Niarchos Family	1:32.20
2005	Valima	Christophe Soumillon	André Fabre	HH Aga Khan IV	1:30.40
2006	Mauralakana	Ioritz Mendizabal	Jean-Claude Rouget	Maurice Hassan	1:30.20
2007	Magic America	Johnny Murtagh	Criquette Head-Maarek	Tony Ryan	1:24.50
2008	Natagora	Christophe Lemaire	Pascal Bary	Stefan Friborg	1:29.90
2009	Elusive Wave	Christophe Lemaire	Jean-Claude Rouget	Martin Schwartz	1:23.60
2010	Joanna	Christophe Soumillon	Jean-Claude Rouget	Hamdan Al Maktoum	1:28.60
2011	Moonlight Cloud	Davy Bonilla	Freddy Head	George Strawbridge	1:26.10
2012	Mashoora	Christophe Soumillon	Jean-Claude Rouget	Hamdan Al Maktoum	1:26.50
2013	What a Name	Christophe Lemaire	Mikel Delzangles	Mohammed bin Khalifa Al Thani	1:26.67
2014	Xcellence	Cristian Demuro	François Doumen	Henri de Pracotmal	1:27.40
2015	Ervedya	Christophe Soumillon	Jean-Claude Rouget	HH Aga Khan	1:28.27
2016	Spectre	Pierre-Charles Boudot	Markus Munch	MM Racing	1:27.60
2017	Via Ravenna	Vincent Cheminaud	André Fabre	Haras de Saint Pair	1:25.80
2018	Couer De Beaute (Note: The 2018 running was held at Deauville)	Stéphane Pasquier	Mauricio Delcher-Sanchez	Ahmed Mouknass	1:30.35
2019	Watch Me	Christophe Soumillon	Francis-Henri Graffard	Tamagni-Bodmer / Vannod	1:28.09
2020	not held
2021	Reina Madre (Note: The 2021 running was held at Deauville due to the closing of the Hippodrome of Maisons-Laffitte.)	Christophe Soumillon	Mauricio Delcher Sanchez	Yeguada Centurion SL	1:25.12
2022	Malavath (Note: The 2022 running was held at Deauville due to the closing of the Hippodrome of Maisons-Laffitte.)	Christophe Soumillon	Francis-Henri Graffard	Everest Racing, David Redvers & Mrs Barbara M Keller	1:32.25
2023	Showay	Anthony Crastus	Patrice Cottier	Gousserie Racing	1:27.82
2024	Romantic Style	William Buick	Charlie Appleby	Godolphin	1:31.95
2025	Better Together	Alexis Pouchin	Andre Fabre	Juddmonte	1:24.25
2026	Showna	Marvin Grandin	Satoshi Kobayashi	Guy Pariente Holding & S Kobayashi	1:19.66

== Earlier winners ==
- 1953: Cabriole
- 1954: Bethora
- 1955: Reinata
- 1956: Cigalon
- 1957: Fidgety
- 1958: Bella Paola
- 1959: Paraguana
- 1960: Never Too Late
- 1961: Solitude
- 1962: Monade
- 1963: Hula Dancer
- 1964: Texanita
- 1966: Miliza
- 1965: Clear River
- 1967: Fix the Date
- 1968: Salade Chinoise
- 1969: Mismaloya
- 1970: Balsane
- 1971: Pomme Rose
- 1972: Arosa
- 1973: Libelinha
- 1974: Lianga
- 1975: Girl Friend
- 1976: Guichet
- 1977: Flota Armada
- 1978: Best Girl

== See also ==
- List of French flat horse races
