= Coup de Genie (horse) =

American thoroughbred racehorse

- Breed: Thoroughbred
- Sire: Mr. Prospector
- Grandsire: Raise a Native
- Dam: Coup de Folie
- Damsire: Halo
- Sex: Mare
- Foaled: 1991
- Country: United States
- Breeder: Flaxman Holdings Ltd.
- Owner: Stavros Niarchos
- Trainer: François Boutin
- Record: 9:4-1-1
- Earnings: $402,372

Major wins
- Prix de Cabourg (1993); Prix de la Salamandre (1993); Prix Morny (1993); Prix Imprudence (1994)

Coup de Genie (foaled May 7, 1991), which means "Stroke of Genius" in French, is an American-bred Thoroughbred racehorse, winner of the 1993 Prix de la Salamandre. She is the sister of Machiavellian.

== Career ==
Coup de Genie's first race was on July 1, 1993, in Évry, where she came in 2nd place.

Her first win was a Group 3 win in the Prix de Cabourg on August 1, 1993.

She was again victorious, this time winning the Group 1 1993 Prix Morny on August 22, 1993.

Coup de Genie's luck did not stop there as for the 3rd time in 7 weeks, she won again. This time she won the Group 1 1993 Prix de la Salamandre.

Coup de Genie's last win came on April 5, 1994, when she won the Group 3 1994 Prix Imprudence.

Coup de Genie's last race was on September 18, 1994, where she finished in 4th at 1994 Prix du Pin.

== Descendants ==
Coup de Genie's descendants include:

c = colt, f = filly

Foaled	Name	Sex	Major Wins
1998	Snake Mountain	c	Queens County Handicap, Stuyvesant Handicap
1999	Glia	f	Prix Imprudence
2000	Loving Kindness	f	Prix de Cabourg
2001	Denebola	f	Prix de Cabourg

== Pedigree ==
Pedigree of Coup de Genie (USA), 1991
Sire Mr. Prospector (USA) 1970	Raise a Native(USA); 1961	Native Dancer	Polynesian
Sire Mr. Prospector (USA) 1970	Raise a Native(USA); 1961	Native Dancer	Geisha
Sire Mr. Prospector (USA) 1970	Raise a Native(USA); 1961	Raise You	Case Ace
Sire Mr. Prospector (USA) 1970	Raise a Native(USA); 1961	Raise You	Lady Glory
Sire Mr. Prospector (USA) 1970	Gold Digger (USA); 1962	Nashua	Nasrullah
Sire Mr. Prospector (USA) 1970	Gold Digger (USA); 1962	Nashua	Segula
Sire Mr. Prospector (USA) 1970	Gold Digger (USA); 1962	Sequence	Count Fleet
Sire Mr. Prospector (USA) 1970	Gold Digger (USA); 1962	Sequence	Miss Dogwood
Dam Coup de Folie (USA) 1982	Halo (USA); 1965	Hail to Reason	Turn-to
Dam Coup de Folie (USA) 1982	Halo (USA); 1965	Hail to Reason	Nothirdchance
Dam Coup de Folie (USA) 1982	Halo (USA); 1965	Cosmah	Cosmic Bomb
Dam Coup de Folie (USA) 1982	Halo (USA); 1965	Cosmah	Almahmoud
Dam Coup de Folie (USA) 1982	Raise the Standard (CAN) (1978)	Hoist The Flag	Tom Rolfe
Dam Coup de Folie (USA) 1982	Raise the Standard (CAN) (1978)	Hoist The Flag	Wavy Navy
Dam Coup de Folie (USA) 1982	Raise the Standard (CAN) (1978)	Natalma	Native Dancer
Dam Coup de Folie (USA) 1982	Raise the Standard (CAN) (1978)	Natalma	Almahmoud
