= Rhododendron (horse) =

Irish-bred Thoroughbred racehorse

- Racing silks of Sue Magnier
- Sire: Galileo
- Grandsire: Sadler's Wells
- Dam: Halfway to Heaven
- Damsire: Pivotal
- Sex: Mare
- Foaled: 11 February 2014
- Country: Ireland
- Colour: Bay
- Breeder: Orpendale, Chelston & Wynatt
- Owner: Susan Magnier, Michael Tabor & Derrick Smith
- Trainer: Aidan O'Brien
- Record: 19: 5-4-1
- Earnings: £1,363,927

Major wins
- Debutante Stakes (2016); Fillies' Mile (2016); Prix de l'Opéra (2017); Lockinge Stakes (2018)

Awards
- Top-rated European-trained two-year-old filly (2016)

Rhododendron (foaled 11 February 2014) is an Irish retired Thoroughbred racehorse and broodmare. As a two-year-old in 2016 she was rated the joint-best filly of her generation trained in Europe, inferior only to the American filly Lady Aurelia. After finishing second on her racecourse debut she won a maiden race at Goodwood Racecourse and then recorded her first important success when taking the Group Two Debutante Stakes at the Curragh in August. She was slightly disappointing when finishing third in the Moyglare Stud Stakes but returned to her best in October to win the Fillies' Mile. As a three-year-old she finished second in both the 1000 Guineas and the Oaks before winning the Prix de l'Opéra. As a four-year-old in 2018 she added another major win in the Lockinge Stakes. She made an instant impact as a broodmare, producing the dual Derby winner Auguste Rodin from her first mating.

== Background ==
Rhododendron is a bay filly with no white markings bred in Ireland by Orpendale, Chelston & Wynatt, breeding companies associated with the Coolmore Stud organisation. The filly was sent into training with Aidan O'Brien at Ballydoyle. Like many Coolmore horses, the official details of her ownership have changed from race to race: she has sometimes been listed as being the property of Susan Magnier, while on other occasions she has been described as being owned by a partnership of Derrick Smith, Michael Tabor and Susan Magnier.

She was sired by Galileo, who won the Derby, Irish Derby and King George VI and Queen Elizabeth Stakes in 2001. Galileo is now one of the world's leading stallions and has been champion sire of Great Britain and Ireland five times. His other progeny include Cape Blanco, Frankel, Golden Lilac, Nathaniel, New Approach, Rip Van Winkle, Found Minding and Ruler of the World. Rhododendron's dam Halfway to Heaven was one of the best European fillies of her generation, winning the Irish 1,000 Guineas, Nassau Stakes and Sun Chariot Stakes in 2008. Halfway to Heaven's dam, Cassandra Go was a top class sprinter, whose wins included the King George Stakes, Temple Stakes and King's Stand Stakes and was a descendant of the Kentucky Oaks winner Native Street. As a daughter of Galileo out of a Pivotal mare she was bred on very similar lines to her stablemate and contemporary Hydrangea, against whom she raced on several occasions.

== Racing career ==
=== 2016: two-year-old season ===
Rhododendron had her first run in a maiden race over seven furlongs at the Curragh on 24 June. Ridden by Seamie Heffernan she started at odds of 7/1 and finished second, two and a quarter lengths behind the winner Rehana. In July the filly was sent to England and started odds-on favourite for a seven furlong maiden at Goodwood Racecourse in which she was ridden by Ryan Moore. After racing in mid-division in the twelve-runner field she took the lead inside the final furlong and won by one and three-quarter lengths from the Ralph Beckett-trained Amabilis.

In August she was reunited with Heffernan when she was moved up in class for the Group Two Debutante Stakes at the Curragh and started 11/8 favourite ahead of Rehana and the O'Brien-trained Brave Anna. The best fancied of the other six runners were the Ballydoyle third string Hydrangea and Intricately, trained by Aidan O'Brien's son Joseph. Hydrangea set the early pace with Rhododendron settled behind the leaders before moving up to join her stable companion approaching the final furlong. The favourite gained the advantage and despite hanging right in the closing stages she held off the rallying Hydrangea to win by a head. Commenting on the performances of the sirst two finishers O'Brien said "They ran very well and both gave the impression they'll stay further. We thought Rhododendron had come forward from her Goodwood maiden win while Hydrangea, too, is progressive and she rallied well when the other filly headed her."

On 11 September Rhododendron was moved up to Group One class for the Moyglare Stud Stakes at the Curragh and started second favourite behind her stablemate Promise To Be True, the winner of the Silver Flash Stakes in a seven-runner field which also included Hydrangea, Rehana, Brave Anna and Intricately. After chasing the leaders she reached third place at half way but could make no further progress after hanging right again and finished third behind Intricately and Hydrangea. Rhododendron ended her season with a second trip to England to contest the Fillies' Mile at Newmarket Racecourse on 7 October. Ridden by Moore she was made the 5/2 joint-favourite alongside the Godolphin filly Subetsu with Hydrangea third in the betting on 4/1. The other five runners were the May Hill Stakes winner Rich Legacy and the maiden winners Spatial, Fleabiscuit, Easy Victory and Urban Fox. Rich Legacy took an early lead before giving way to Spatial after two furlongs as Moore settled Rhododendron just behind the leaders. Rhododendron made good progress in the last quarter mile, took the lead approaching the final furlong and quickly opened up a clear advantage. She stayed on well to win "comfortably" by two and a quarter lengths from Hydrangea with a gap of six lengths back to Urban Fox in third place. After the race O'Brien said "We were a little confused with her run in the Moyglare. We always thought she was a little bit better than Hydrangea at home. You couldn’t be sure with them but they are two very good-looking fillies out of two very good mares."

=== 2017: three-year-old season ===
In 2017 Rhododendron did not contest any of the recognised trial races and made her seasonal debut in the 1000 Guineas over the Rowley Mile course at Newmarket on 7 May. Ridden by Moore she started 5/4 favourite against thirteen opponents. After being repeatedly blocked in her attempts to make progress in the last quarter mile she was switched sharply left and finished strongly but was beaten two lengths into second place by her stablemate Winter.

Despite her defeat at Newmarket Rhododendron was made odds-on favourite when she was stepped up to one and a half miles for the Oaks Stakes over one and a half miles at Epsom Racecourse on 2 June. She was the only filly to offer any challenge to the winner Enable but after racing alongside the British-trained filly from two furlongs out she faded in the closing stages and was beaten five lengths into second place. She was then sent to France for the Prix de Diane at Chantilly Racecourse sixteen days later but had no chance to show her true form as she was pulled up by Moore after breaking a blood vessel. O'Brien later said "it was the worst you've ever seen. She sprayed blood everywhere. We put it down to a very hot day and she's never done it before or since but they very rarely come back from something like that."

After a break of over two months the filly returned for the Matron Stakes at the Curragh in September and came home seventh of the ten runners behind her stablemate Hydrangea. At Chantilly on 1 October, faced Hydrangea again in the Group 1 Prix de l'Opéra over 2000 metres and started at odds of 11/2 in a thirteen-runner field which also included Senga, Queen's Trust (Breeders' Cup Filly & Mare Turf), Lacazar (Preis der Diana), Wuheida, Shamreen (Blandford Stakes) and Left Hand (Prix Vermeille). Ridden by Seamie Heffernan she tracked the leaders before going to the front in the straight and held on "gamely" in the closing stages to win in a five-horse blanket finish from Hydrangea, Lady Frankel, Wuheida and Left Hand.

For her final run of the year Rhododendron was sent to California for the Breeders' Cup Filly & Mare Turf over nine furlongs at Del Mar on 4 November and started the 4/1 second favourite behind Lady Eli. She stayed on well in the straight but was beaten a length into second place by Wuheida.

=== 2018: four-year-old season ===
Rhododendron began her third campaign by taking on male opposition for the first time and finishing fourth behind Cracksman in the Prix Ganay over 2100 metres at the re-opened Longchamp Racecourse on 29 April. She was again matched against male opponents in the Group 1 Lockinge Stakes at Newbury Racecourse on 19 May and started the 100/30 favourite in a fourteen-runner field which included Limato, Lancaster Bomber, Lightning Spear, Accidental Agent, Addeybb (Sandon Mile), Suedois (Shadwell Turf Mile Stakes) and Deauville (Belmont Derby). After racing close behind the leaders, the filly produced a strong late run, caught Lightning Spear on the line and won by a short head. Ryan Moore commented "She's been a great filly at two, three and now four. It's testament to everyone who puts in the hard work at home. She's been unfortunate not to have won more in her time. She's very adaptable with ground, distance and has got a great attitude".

In the Queen Anne Stakes at Royal Ascot Rhododendron started second favourite but never looked likely to win and came home ninth of the fifteen runners behind Accidental Agent. She then finished last of six behind Wild Illusion when favourite for the Nassau Stakes at Goodwood Racecourse on 2 August and last of nine in the Prix Jean Romanet at Deauville Racecourse later that month. On 15 September she faced top-class male opposition in the Irish Champion Stakes and came home sixth of the seven runners behind Roaring Lion. An attempt to repeat her 2017 success in the Prix de l'Opéra ended in failure as she finished twelfth, more than 20 lengths behind the winner Wild Illusion at Longchamp Racecourse on 7 October. She produced a much better effort in the Champion Stakes at Ascot two weeks later as she finished fifth of the eight runners behind Cracksman, just over two lengths behind the second-placed Crystal Ocean.

== Assessment ==
In the official European Classification of two-year-olds for 2016 Rhododendron was given a rating of 116, making her the second best juvenile filly of the season, five pounds behind Lady Aurelia and equal to Brave Anna.

== Breeding record ==
Rhododendron's first foal was a colt by Deep Impact named Auguste Rodin, who won the Epsom Derby and Irish Derby in 2023.

== Pedigree ==
Pedigree of Rhododendron (IRE), bay filly, 2014
Sire Galileo (IRE) 1998	Sadler's Wells (USA); 1981	Northern Dancer	Nearctic
Sire Galileo (IRE) 1998	Sadler's Wells (USA); 1981	Northern Dancer	Natalma
Sire Galileo (IRE) 1998	Sadler's Wells (USA); 1981	Fairy Bridge	Bold Reason
Sire Galileo (IRE) 1998	Sadler's Wells (USA); 1981	Fairy Bridge	Special
Sire Galileo (IRE) 1998	Urban Sea (USA) ch. 1989	Miswaki	Mr. Prospector
Sire Galileo (IRE) 1998	Urban Sea (USA) ch. 1989	Miswaki	Hopespringseternal
Sire Galileo (IRE) 1998	Urban Sea (USA) ch. 1989	Allegretta	Lombard
Sire Galileo (IRE) 1998	Urban Sea (USA) ch. 1989	Allegretta	Anatevka
Dam Halfway to Heaven (IRE) 2005	Pivotal (GB); 1993	Polar Falcon	Nureyev
Dam Halfway to Heaven (IRE) 2005	Pivotal (GB); 1993	Polar Falcon	Marie d'Argonne
Dam Halfway to Heaven (IRE) 2005	Pivotal (GB); 1993	Fearless Revival	Cozzene
Dam Halfway to Heaven (IRE) 2005	Pivotal (GB); 1993	Fearless Revival	Stufida
Dam Halfway to Heaven (IRE) 2005	Cassandra Go (IRE); 1996	Indian Ridge	Ahonoora
Dam Halfway to Heaven (IRE) 2005	Cassandra Go (IRE); 1996	Indian Ridge	Millbrow
Dam Halfway to Heaven (IRE) 2005	Cassandra Go (IRE); 1996	Rahaam	Secreto
Dam Halfway to Heaven (IRE) 2005	Cassandra Go (IRE); 1996	Rahaam	Fager's Glory (Family 3-d)
