= Winter (horse) =

Irish-bred Thoroughbred racehorse

- Racing silks of Sue Magnier
- Sire: Galileo
- Grandsire: Sadler's Wells
- Dam: Laddies Poker Two
- Damsire: Choisir
- Sex: Mare
- Foaled: 15 February 2014
- Country: Ireland
- Colour: Grey
- Breeder: Laddies Poker Two Syndicate
- Owner: Derrick Smith, Susan Magnier & Michael Tabor
- Trainer: David Wachman; Aidan O'Brien
- Record: 9:5-2-2
- Earnings: £1,089,592

Major wins
- 1000 Guineas (2017); Irish 1,000 Guineas (2017); Coronation Stakes (2017); Nassau Stakes (2017)

Winter (foaled 15 February 2014) is an Irish Thoroughbred racehorse. She won one minor race from three starts as a two-year-old in 2016, but made considerable improvement in the following spring and won the 1000 Guineas on her fifth racecourse appearance. She went on to record further Group 1 victories in the Irish 1,000 Guineas, Coronation Stakes and Nassau Stakes.

== Background ==
Winter is a grey filly bred in Ireland by the Laddies Poker Two Syndicate, a horse breeding company associated with the Coolmore Stud. The filly was sent into training with David Wachman at Goolds Cross, County Tipperary. Like many Coolmore horses, the official details of her ownership have changed from race to race but she is usually described as being owned by a partnership of Derrick Smith, Michael Tabor and Susan Magnier. She has been ridden in all of her races by Wayne Lordan.

She was sired by Galileo, who won the Derby, Irish Derby and King George VI and Queen Elizabeth Stakes in 2001. Galileo is now one of the world's leading stallions and has been champion sire of Great Britain and Ireland eight times so far. His other progeny include Cape Blanco, Frankel, Golden Lilac, Nathaniel, New Approach, Rip Van Winkle, Found, Minding and Ruler of the World. Winter's dam Laddies Poker Two, from whom she inherited her grey colour, was a lightly raced sprinter best known for winning the Wokingham Stakes at Royal Ascot as a five-year-old in 2010. She was a great granddaughter of the Prix Morny winner Ancient Regime, who was closely related to Scottish Rifle and many other good winners descended from the British broodmare Radiopye (foaled 1954).

== Racing career ==
=== 2016: two-year-old season ===
Winter began her racing career on 11 May in a maiden race over six furlongs at Naas Racecourse in which she finished third to Cuff and Wayside Flower after struggling to obtain a clear run in the closing stages. After a break of more than two months she returned for a maiden over one mile at Gowran Park in July, and started favourite but ran disappointingly, finishing third to Butterflies. On 14 August the filly started 7/4 favourite for a maiden over seven furlong at Dundalk Racecourse and recorded her first success, taking the lead inside the last quarter mile and winning by one and a quarter lengths from Dreamy Gal.

When Wachman retired from training at the end of the season, Winter was transferred to the stable of Aidan O'Brien at Ballydoyle.

=== 2017: three-year-old season ===
==== Spring ====
Winter began her second season in a strong renewal of the Leopardstown 1,000 Guineas Trial Stakes on 8 April. After chasing the leaders in the early stages she stayed on strongly to finish second, beaten a head by her stablemate Hydrangea with Intricately (winner of the Moyglare Stud Stakes) in fourth and the favourite Promise To Be True (second in the Prix Marcel Boussac) in sixth place. The filly's performance attracted little immediate attention, but at the start of May she began to attract considerable support for the 1000 Guineas, being backed down from 33/1 to 10/1 in the ante-post betting market.

On 7 May Winter was one of fourteen fillies to contest the 204th running of the 1000 Guineas over the Rowley Mile course at Newmarket Racecourse. Rhododendron (alo trained by O'Brien) started the 5/4 favourite ahead of Daban (Nell Gwyn Stakes) and Fair Eva (Princess Margaret Stakes), with Winter next in the betting on 9/1 alongside Hydrangea. The other runners included Intricately, Queen Kindly (Lowther Stakes), Poets Vanity (Oh So Sharp Stakes) and the highly regarded maiden winner Talaayeb. After meeting some interference in the early stages Wayne Lordan settled the filly in mid division before producing Winter with a strong run down the center of the track to take the lead two furlongs out. Winter kept on well and never looked in serious danger of defeat, winning by two lengths and a neck from Rhododendron and Daban. After the race Lordan said "I went forward quite early because she's a filly that gallops and I knew the track would suit her. This means a lot. I'm very grateful to Aidan for letting me keep the ride on the filly".

Three weeks after her win at Newmarket, Winter, ridden by Ryan Moore, started the 8/13 favourite for the Irish 1000 Guineas at the Curragh. Hydrangea and Intricately were again in opposition whilst the other five runners included Rehana (Athasi Stakes) and Roly Poly (Duchess of Cambridge Stakes). After being settled in fourth place, Winter took the lead inside the last quarter mile and drew away to win "easily" by four and three quarter lengths from Roly Poly. Moore commented "It was very easy. She gave me a lovely ride and it was very straightforward. She was relentless."

==== Summer ====
At Royal Ascot on 23 June Winter attempted to become only the second filly (after Attraction) to follow up wins in the English and Irish 1,000 Guineas with a success in the Coronation Stakes. Hydrangea and Roly Poly were again in the field, but her biggest dangers appeared to come from the French filly Precieuse (Poule d'Essai des Pouliches) and the John Gosden-trained Dabyah (Fred Darling Stakes), whilst the other two runners were La Coronel from Canada (Appalachian Stakes) and Tomyris (Michael Seely Memorial Stakes). Starting the 4/9 favourite, Winter took the lead in the straight and won by two and a quarter lengths and a neck from Roly Poly and Hydrangea. Aidan OBrien said "She's a filly who is thriving from race-to-race, she travelled well, Ryan had her in a lovely position and she's won very well. She gets the trip very well, she's very classy and is a great traveller. When you ask her she gallops out strong" before stating that the Breeders' Cup at Del Mar would be her end-of-season target.

On 3 August at Goodwood Racecourse Winter was moved up in distance and matched against older fillies and mares in the ten-furlong Nassau Stakes, a race for which she started 10/11 favourite. Hydrangea was again among her rivals while the other four runners were Queen's Trust (Breeders' Cup Filly & Mare Turf), Sobetsu (Prix Saint-Alary), So Mi Dar (Musidora Stakes) and Blond Me (Topkapi Trophy). Running on soft ground she raced close behind the leaders, took the lead a furlong out, and kept on well to win "quite comfortably" by one and a half lengths from Blond Me. O'Brien expressed his satisfaction with the filly saying "She’ll be happier back on good ground but she's a good bit bigger and stronger than she was. That ground was like National Hunt ground. She should be ready for the second half of the season and getting a mile and a quarter that well leaves an awful lot of options open to her".

== Pedigree ==
Pedigree of Winter (IRE), grey filly, 2014
Sire Galileo (IRE) 1998	Sadler's Wells (USA); 1981	Northern Dancer	Nearctic
Sire Galileo (IRE) 1998	Sadler's Wells (USA); 1981	Northern Dancer	Natalma
Sire Galileo (IRE) 1998	Sadler's Wells (USA); 1981	Fairy Bridge	Bold Reason
Sire Galileo (IRE) 1998	Sadler's Wells (USA); 1981	Fairy Bridge	Special
Sire Galileo (IRE) 1998	Urban Sea (USA); 1989	Miswaki	Mr. Prospector
Sire Galileo (IRE) 1998	Urban Sea (USA); 1989	Miswaki	Hopespringseternal
Sire Galileo (IRE) 1998	Urban Sea (USA); 1989	Allegretta	Lombard
Sire Galileo (IRE) 1998	Urban Sea (USA); 1989	Allegretta	Anatevka
Dam Laddies Poker Two (IRE) 2005	Choisir (IRE); 1999	Danehill Dancer	Danehill
Dam Laddies Poker Two (IRE) 2005	Choisir (IRE); 1999	Danehill Dancer	Mira Adonde
Dam Laddies Poker Two (IRE) 2005	Choisir (IRE); 1999	Great Selection	Lunchtime
Dam Laddies Poker Two (IRE) 2005	Choisir (IRE); 1999	Great Selection	Pensive Mood
Dam Laddies Poker Two (IRE) 2005	Break of Day (USA); 2000	Favorite Trick	Phone Trick
Dam Laddies Poker Two (IRE) 2005	Break of Day (USA); 2000	Favorite Trick	Evil Elaine
Dam Laddies Poker Two (IRE) 2005	Break of Day (USA); 2000	Quelle Affaire	Riverman
Dam Laddies Poker Two (IRE) 2005	Break of Day (USA); 2000	Quelle Affaire	Ancient Regime (Family 15-a)
