= Lady Aurelia =

American-bred Thoroughbred racehorse

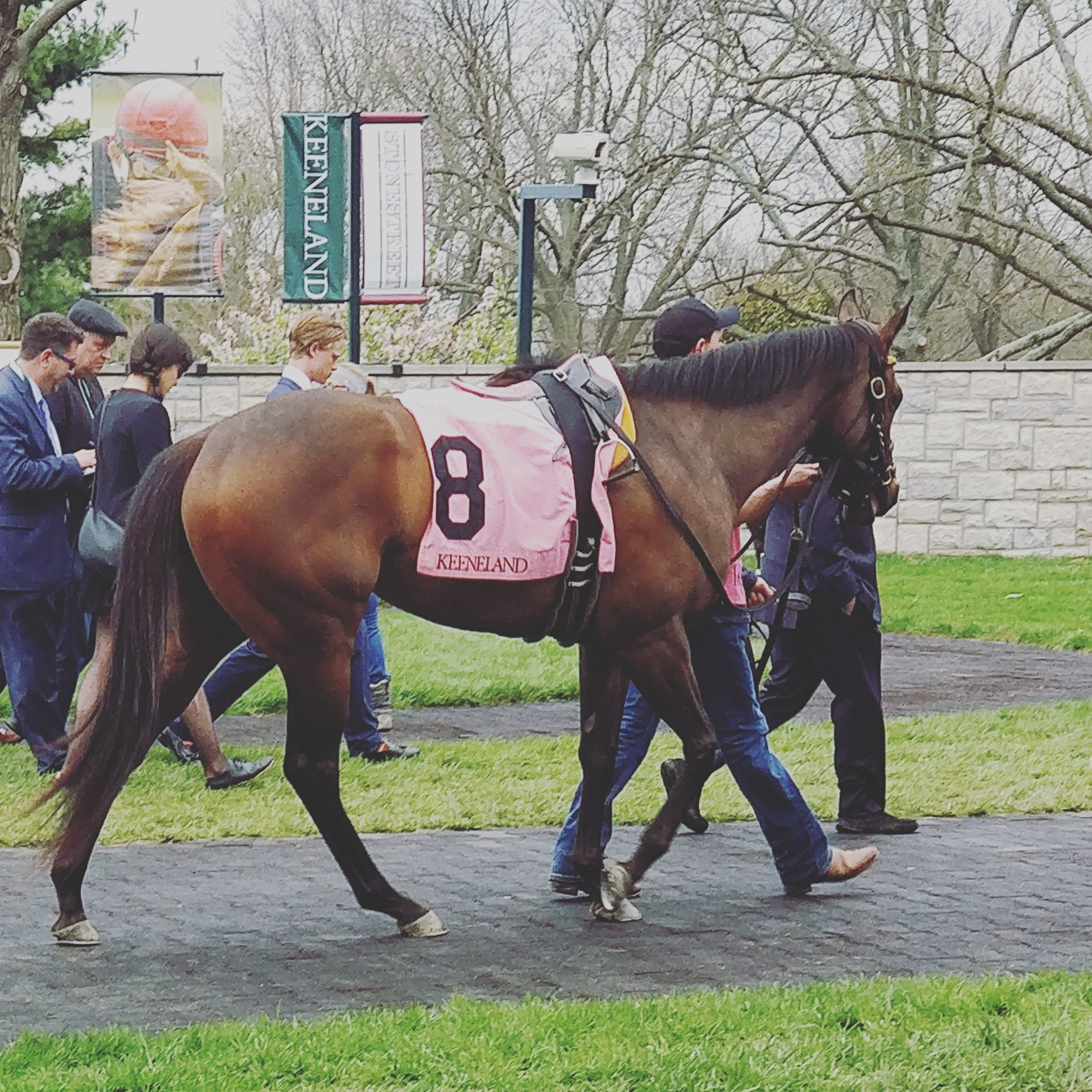
- Lady Aurelia in the paddock before placing 2nd in the 2018 Giant's Causeway at Keeneland.
- Sire: Scat Daddy
- Grandsire: Johannesburg
- Dam: D' Wildcat Speed
- Damsire: Forest Wildcat
- Sex: Mare
- Foaled: 27 January 2014
- Country: United States
- Colour: Bay
- Breeder: Stonestreet Thoroughbred Holdings LLC
- Owner: Stonestreet Stables, George Bolton & Peter Leidel
- Trainer: Wesley Ward
- Record: 9: 5-2-1
- Earnings: $834,945

Major wins
- Queen Mary Stakes (2016); Prix Morny (2016); Giant's Causeway Stakes (2017); King's Stand Stakes (2017)

Awards
- Cartier Champion Two-year-old Filly (2016); Top rated European two-year-old filly (2016); Timeform rating: 135

Lady Aurelia (foaled 27 January 2014) is a retired American Thoroughbred racehorse. After winning a race on dirt in the United States, she was sent to race on turf in Europe and proved herself as one of the leading two-year-old fillies of her generation. At Royal Ascot in June she produced a very impressive performance to win the Queen Mary Stakes and then traveled to France to win the Prix Morny. Although she was beaten on her final appearance in the Cheveley Park Stakes she was named Cartier Champion Two-year-old Filly for the 2016 season. In 2017 she won the Giant's Causeway Stakes in America before returning to Britain to win the King's Stand Stakes at Royal Ascot. She then finished second in the Nunthorpe Stakes before finishing tenth in the Breeders' Cup Turf Sprint.

== Background ==
Lady Aurelia is a bay filly with a white star bred in Kentucky by Stonestreet Thoroughbred Holdings LLC. As a yearling in September 2015, Lady Aurelia was consigned to the Keeneland Sales and was bought for $350,000 by George Bolton & Peter Leidel although Stonestreet retained an interest in the filly. The filly was sent into training with Wesley Ward, who had a record of success with precocious juveniles in European races.

She was sired by Scat Daddy, who won the Champagne Stakes in 2006 and the Florida Derby in 2007 before his racing career was ended by injury. Scat Daddy's other offspring include No Nay Never, Daddy Long Legs and the American Oaks winner Lady of Shamrock. Lady Aurelia's dam D' Wildcat Speed was a Kentucky-bred mare who had great success in Puerto Rico before returning to the United States as a five-year-old to win the Rampart Stakes. She was a distant, female-line descendant of the influential British broodmare Affection, who was the ancestor of numerous major winners including Creme Fraiche, Coastal and Nathaniel.

== Racing career ==
=== 2016: two-year-old season ===
Lady Aurelia made her track debut at Keeneland on 21 April when she was one of six juvenile fillies to contest a maiden race over four and a half furlongs on dirt. Starting the odds-on favourite, she led from the start and steadily increased her advantage to win "comfortably" by seven and a half lengths, in a track record time of :50.85.

The filly was then sent to England and had her first race on turf in the Group Two Queen Mary Stakes over the straight five furlongs at Royal Ascot on 19 June. Ward had an excellent record at the meeting and had won the Queen Mary with Jealous Again in 2009 and Acapulco in 2015 but the prevailing soft ground was not expected to suit Lady Aurelia. Ridden by Frankie Dettori, she started the 2/1 favourite with the best-fancied of her sixteen opponents being the French challenger Al Johrah. Lady Aurelia went straight to the front and was never seriously challenged, accelerating away from her rivals in the final furlong to win by seven lengths from Al Johrah. The Racing Post described her victory as "one of the most devastating displays seen in modern times at Royal Ascot". Dettori commented, "That was breathtaking from the top. To win by seven lengths at Royal Ascot was sensational and I've never seen or experienced anything like it especially for a two-year-old". Ward said, "She's an amazing filly and she'll have a big future." Stonestreet Stable's spokesman John Moynihan said, "We always knew she was special from the time we broke her at the farm in Ocala. It was an amazing race and we were certainly worried about the rain and the soft ground they had, but she powered through it and we were ecstatic."

For her next race, Lady Aurelia was sent to France for the Group One Prix Morny over 1200 metres at Deauville Racecourse on 21 August and was made the 2/7 favourite. Al Johrah was again in opposition whilst her other three opponents were Tis Marvellous (winner of the Prix Robert Papin), Peace Envoy (Anglesey Stakes) and Alrahma (Prix de Cabourg). She led from the start and although she was unable to open up a clear advantage she was "always in command" and won by three quarters of a length and a head from Alrahma and Peace Envoy. Dettori explained, "She hit two bad patches [of ground] and the second one she put her foot right in a hole and lost all her momentum. I won the race by a length but I could have won by three. With a sound surface she would have skipped right away." Ward said, "Coming into the race, we gave her a little break and trained her a little light... To have a filly like this is once in a lifetime. I think she's going to really show what she's got in the coming few races and we're very excited".

On 24 September Lady Aurelia, with Dettori again in the saddle, started the 4/6 favourite for the Group One Cheveley Park Stakes over six furlongs at Newmarket Racecourse. The best-fancied of her five opponents were Queen Kindly (Lowther Stakes) and the Irish challenger Roly Poly (Duchess of Cambridge Stakes). Lady Aurelia went to the front from the start and went clear of the field but came under pressure approaching the final furlong. She was overtaken 50 yards from the finish and was beaten into third place by Brave Anna and Roly Poly. Ward commented, "It's a humbling game, I expected her to win today... it just wasn't there in the last bit. She's had a tough campaign and she's a special filly." A few days after the race, Ward explained to England's Press Association that "when we got back to the barn, the vet scoped her and she ended up having bled with a score of three out of five, which, in a group I, is enough to get you beat, probably."

=== 2017: three-year-old season ===
Lady Aurelia started her three-year-old season on 15 April as the even money favourite in the Listed Giant's Causeway Stakes at Keeneland, where she faced a full field of older fillies and mares. She tracked the rapid early pace in fifth place, then made a five-wide move around the final turn. Despite having lost a shoe, she pulled away with a "sublime kick" to win by 2 1/2 lengths.

Lady Aurelia arrived safely in England on 6 June to prepare for the King's Stand Stakes on 20 June at Royal Ascot. Dettori was scheduled to ride the filly but sustained an arm injury and was replaced by John Velasquez. Lady Aurelia started second favourite behind the British mare Marsha, while the other sixteen runners included Goldream and Profitable, the winners of the last two runnings of the race. Lady Aurelia took the lead in the last quarter mile and drew away to win by 3 lengths in a time of 0:57.45 for 5 furlongs defeating Profitable and Marsha. Ward said, "This is a Group 1 featuring the fastest sprinters in the world, and to duplicate last year, she's a once-in-a-lifetime horse."

Lady Aurelia made her next start on 25 August in the Nunthorpe Stakes at York. With Dettori back on board, she went to the front with Battaash, who gave way in the final half-furlong. Lady Aurelia seemed to have the race in hand but Marsha closed rapidly down the crown of the course and won by a nose. "I'm in shock", said Dettori. "I thought I'd won by a neck."

Lady Aurelia returned to America for the Breeders' Cup Turf Sprint, held that year at Del Mar in California. She was the odds-on favorite in a field of twelve but weakened in the stretch to finish tenth. Velazquez had no excuses for the poor performance. "There were a couple of speed horses so I let them go", he said. "She was just flat down the lane." "It was a long season,"said Ward, "and we lost that sizzle from earlier in the year."

=== 2018: four-year-old season ===
After a short break, Lady Aurelia returned to the work tap with a 3 furlong breeze in :38.48 at the Stonestreet Training on February 3. She breezed seven more times before she was entered in the Giant's Causeway Stakes on April 14 at Keeneland, where she finished a solid 2nd beaten by 1 1/2 lengths by Triple Chelasea. She then started training for a return to Royal Ascot for the GI King's Stand. On June 19 in the GI King's Stand Stakes, Lady Aurelia ran a disappointing 7th, after the race her jockey John Velazquez said: "She seemed to handle the ground well, she just didn't fire." Her trainer Wesley Ward said: "She's older and seasoned – I just don't know."

=== Retirement ===
On July 18, Wesley Ward said: "She's been retired. It was a hard decision for me, it probably wasn’t as hard for her owners, she's been feeling so good at home, she looks a million dollars, but we have to admit that her last three races haven’t been good. Admittedly she set very high standards, but she hasn’t been living up to those. It's best for her that she's retired, she's sound and healthy and she's done a tremendous amount for my career. I can’t thank connections enough for trusting me to train her. I’ve had Breeders’ Cup winners and champion sprinters in America, but she's accomplished more than any of them. To have a filly named Cartier Champion Two-Year-Old for Europe and be trained in America was an unbelievable effort on her part. I’ve got to try to find a replacement now, but horses like her are once-in-a-lifetime."

== Assessment and awards ==
On 8 November 2016, Lady Aurelia was named Champion two-year-old filly at the Cartier Racing Awards, becoming only the second Cartier award winner (after Black Caviar) to be trained outside Europe.

In the official European Classification of two-year-olds for 2016, Lady Aurelia was given a rating of 121, making her the best juvenile filly of the season, one pound below the top-rated colt Churchill .

Following her King's Stand Stakes win, Timeform gave her a rating of 135, placing her just 1 lb below such successful female sprinters as Black Caviar and Habibti.

== Pedigree ==
Pedigree of Lady Aurelia, bay filly, 2014
Sire Scat Daddy (USA) 2004	Johannesburg (USA); 1999	Hennessy	Storm Cat
Sire Scat Daddy (USA) 2004	Johannesburg (USA); 1999	Hennessy	Island Kitty
Sire Scat Daddy (USA) 2004	Johannesburg (USA); 1999	Myth	Ogygian
Sire Scat Daddy (USA) 2004	Johannesburg (USA); 1999	Myth	Yarn
Sire Scat Daddy (USA) 2004	Love Style (USA); 1999	Mr. Prospector	Raise a Native
Sire Scat Daddy (USA) 2004	Love Style (USA); 1999	Mr. Prospector	Gold Digger
Sire Scat Daddy (USA) 2004	Love Style (USA); 1999	Likeable Style	Nijinsky
Sire Scat Daddy (USA) 2004	Love Style (USA); 1999	Likeable Style	Personable Lady
Dam D' Wildcat Speed (USA) 2000	Forest Wildcat (USA); 1991	Storm Cat	Storm Bird
Dam D' Wildcat Speed (USA) 2000	Forest Wildcat (USA); 1991	Storm Cat	Terlingua
Dam D' Wildcat Speed (USA) 2000	Forest Wildcat (USA); 1991	Victoria Beauty	Bold Native
Dam D' Wildcat Speed (USA) 2000	Forest Wildcat (USA); 1991	Victoria Beauty	Abifaith
Dam D' Wildcat Speed (USA) 2000	Velvet Panther (USA); 1991	Pentaquod	London Company
Dam D' Wildcat Speed (USA) 2000	Velvet Panther (USA); 1991	Pentaquod	Enamor
Dam D' Wildcat Speed (USA) 2000	Velvet Panther (USA); 1991	Blue Eyed Cat	Great Above
Dam D' Wildcat Speed (USA) 2000	Velvet Panther (USA); 1991	Blue Eyed Cat	Another Cat (Family:9-f)

- Lady Aurelia is inbred 3 × 4 to Storm Cat, meaning that this stallion appears in both the third and fourth generations of her pedigree.
