= Bad As I Wanna Be (horse) =

Irish-bred Thoroughbred racehorse

- Sire: Common Grounds
- Grandsire: Kris
- Dam: Song of the Glens
- Damsire: Horage
- Sex: Stallion
- Foaled: 11 March 1998
- Country: Ireland
- Colour: Chestnut
- Breeder: Yeomanstown Stud
- Owner: Joe Allbritton; Godolphin
- Trainer: Brian Meehan; Saeed bin Suroor
- Record: 7: 2-0-2
- Earnings: £104,640

Major wins
- Prix Morny (2000)

Bad As I Wanna Be (foaled 11 March 1998 – after 2011) was an Irish-bred, British-trained Thoroughbred racehorse and sire. He showed his best form as a juvenile in 2000 when he won the Prix Morny by six lengths and took third place in the Middle Park Stakes. He did not run as a three-year-old and had no success when campaigned in Dubai in 2002. He failed to make any impact as a breeding stallion.

== Background ==
Bad As I Wanna Be was a chestnut horse with a narrow white blaze bred in Ireland by the County Kildare-based Yeomanstown Stud. In October 1999 the yearling was consigned to the Tattersalls sale and was bought by the Curragh Bloodstock Agency for 62,000 guineas. He entered the ownership of the American banker Joe Allbritton and was sent into training with Brian Meehan at Lambourn in Berkshire.

His sire Common Grounds was a British-bred stallion who was trained in France and showed his best form as a two-year-old in 1987 when he won the Prix de la Salamandre. As a breeding stallion, the best of his other progeny included Fallow (July Stakes), Murghem (Geoffrey Freer Stakes) and Flanders (Weatherbys Super Sprint). Bad As I Wanna Be's dam, Song of the Glens, showed very little racing ability as she failed to win or place in five starts but was a granddaughter of Polly Macaw, the dam of Right Tack.

The name Bad As I Wanna Be was derived from the autobiography of Dennis Rodman.

== Racing career ==
=== 2000: two-year-old season ===
Bad As I Wanna Be made his racecourse debut in a maiden race over six furlongs at Newbury Racecourse in which he started at odds of 11/2 but came home eleventh of the thirteen runners behind Patsy's Double. After a break of over two months the colt returned for a five furlong maiden at Windsor Racecourse on 31 July in which he started at 6/1 in a sixteen-runner field. Ridden by Jimmy Fortune he took the lead from the start and won "readily" by three lengths from Senior Minister.

On 20 August Bad As I Wanna Be was stepped up sharply in class and sent to France to contest the Prix Morny over 1200 metres at Deauville Racecourse in which he was partnered by Gerald Mosse. The Richmond Stakes winner Endless Summer started odds on favourite ahead of Noverre and Rolly Polly (Prix Robert Papin) with Bad As I Wanna Be starting the 14.4/1 outsider of the six runners. The colt led from the start, broke clear of his rivals 400 metres from the start and won by six lengths from Endless Summer. The runner-up was later disqualified when it was discovered that he had been foaled five days before the end of 1997 and was thus technically a three-year-old. After the race Meehan commented "He's a good, old-fashioned type of horse with a decent pedigree. I'd like to find another race for him before the end of the season, but I am not sure what that race will be".

Mosse again took the ride when the colt returned to France for the Prix de la Salamandre over 1400 metres at Longchamp Racecourse on 16 September. Starting the odds-on favourite, he raced in second place for most of the way but faded in the closing stages and finished last of the four runners behind Tobougg. Twelve days after his defeat at Longchamp, Bad As I Wanna Be contested the Middle Park Stakes at Newmarket Racecourse and went off the 11/2 second favourite. He finished fourth behind Minardi, Endless Summer and Red Carpet but was promoted to third when Endless Summer was disqualified as an ineligible entrant.

In the official classification of European two-year-olds Bad As I Wanna Be was given a rating of 119, making him the fourth best juvenile colt of the season behind Minardi, Okawango and Tobougg.

At the end of the year Bad As I Wanna Be was purchased privately by Sheikh Mohammed's Godolphin organisation and transferred to the stable of Saeed bin Suroor.

=== 2002: four-year-old season ===
After missing the whole of the 2001 season Bad As I Wanna Be returned for two sprint races on the dirt track at Nad Al Sheba Racecourse in Dubai in early 2002 but made little impact. He ran third in a minor race on 12 February and then came home eighth in the Listed Mahab Al Shimaal on 2 March.

== Stud record ==
Bad As I Wanna Be stood as a breeding stallion in Ireland and France but had no success as a sire of winners. His last recorded foal was born in 2012.

== Pedigree ==
Pedigree of Bad As I Wanna Be (IRE), chestnut stallion, 1998
Sire Common Grounds (GB) 1985	Kris (GB); 1976	Sharpen Up	Atan (USA)
Sire Common Grounds (GB) 1985	Kris (GB); 1976	Sharpen Up	Rochetta
Sire Common Grounds (GB) 1985	Kris (GB); 1976	Doubly Sure	Reliance (FR)
Sire Common Grounds (GB) 1985	Kris (GB); 1976	Doubly Sure	Soft Angels
Sire Common Grounds (GB) 1985	Sweetly (FR); 1999	Lyphard (USA)	Northern Dancer (CAN)
Sire Common Grounds (GB) 1985	Sweetly (FR); 1999	Lyphard (USA)	Goofed
Sire Common Grounds (GB) 1985	Sweetly (FR); 1999	Sweet and Lovely	Tanerko
Sire Common Grounds (GB) 1985	Sweetly (FR); 1999	Sweet and Lovely	Lilya
Dam Song of the Glens (IRE) 1986	Horage (IRE); 1980	Tumble Wind (USA)	Restless Wind
Dam Song of the Glens (IRE) 1986	Horage (IRE); 1980	Tumble Wind (USA)	Easy Stages
Dam Song of the Glens (IRE) 1986	Horage (IRE); 1980	Musicienne (FR)	Sicambre
Dam Song of the Glens (IRE) 1986	Horage (IRE); 1980	Musicienne (FR)	Musical
Dam Song of the Glens (IRE) 1986	Melodious Polly (GB); 1973	Tudor Melody	Tudor Minstrel
Dam Song of the Glens (IRE) 1986	Melodious Polly (GB); 1973	Tudor Melody	Matelda
Dam Song of the Glens (IRE) 1986	Melodious Polly (GB); 1973	Polly Macaw (IRE)	Pollys Jet (USA)
Dam Song of the Glens (IRE) 1986	Melodious Polly (GB); 1973	Polly Macaw (IRE)	Listowel (Family: 10-a)
