= Superstar Leo =

Irish-bred Thoroughbred racehorse (1998–2024)

- Sire: College Chapel
- Grandsire: Sharpo
- Dam: Council Rock
- Damsire: General Assembly
- Sex: Mare (female)
- Foaled: 18 March 1998
- Died: June 2024 (aged 26)
- Country: Ireland
- Colour: Chestnut
- Breeder: L K Piggott and A Hirschfeld
- Owner: The Superstar Leo Partnership; Lael Stable
- Trainer: William Haggas
- Record: 13: 5-4-0
- Earnings: £194,956

Major wins
- Norfolk Stakes (2000); Weatherbys Super Sprint (2000); Flying Childers Stakes (2000)

Awards
- European Champion Two-Year-Old Filly (2000)
- Last updated on January 12, 2007

Superstar Leo (18 March 1998 – June 2024) was an Irish-bred, British-trained champion Thoroughbred racehorse and successful broodmare. She was named European Champion Two-Year-Old Filly at the Cartier Racing Awards and was the highest-rated two-year-old filly in the International Classification for 2000. In her championship season she won five races and finished second in the other three. She failed to win in five starts as a three-year-old and was then retired to stud. Superstar Leo died in June 2024, at the age of 26.

== Background ==
Superstar Leo, a small ("pint-sized") bay filly, was sired by the sprinter College Chapel out of the mare Council Rock. She was bred at the Cheval Court Stud, Coulsdon, Surrey by the eleven-times Champion Jockey Lester Piggott who named her after the cruise ship now known as the Norwegian Spirit.

College Chapel won the Cork and Orrery Stakes and the Prix Maurice de Gheest in 1993. At stud he was not a notable success: he sired the winners of more than two hundred winners, but none at Group One level. Apart from Superstar Leo, his best offspring were probably the Greenlands Stakes winner Final Exam and the good handicapper Tolpuddle. Council Rock never won a race but apart from Superstar Leo, she produced ten winners from eighteen foals. She died of a suspected heart attack at the age of twenty-five.

The yearling filly was sent to the Tattersalls sales in October 1999 where she was bought in for 3,400 gns by Maureen Haggas (Lester Piggott's daughter and the wife of the trainer William Haggas). She was registered as being owned by "The Superstar Leo Partnership", a syndicate including Piggott (50%), Maureen Haggas (17.5%) and others.

Superstar Leo was trained throughout her career by William Haggas at Newmarket, Suffolk. She was ridden in eight of her thirteen races by Michael Hills.

== Racing career ==
=== 2000: two-year-old season ===
Superstar Leo began her racing career in a maiden race at Windsor in May, in which she led a furlong out but was caught in the closing stages and beaten a head by Flying Millie. Two weeks later she recorded her first win at Catterick. On this occasion she took the lead from the start, went several lengths clear, and was then eased down in the closing stages to win by three quarters of a length. A week later she returned to the same course and won again, pulling clear inside the last furlong to win by five lengths.

Superstar Leo was then sent to Royal Ascot where she was moved up to Group Three class for the Norfolk Stakes. She was settled behind the leaders by Richard Quinn and sent to the lead a furlong out. She quickened well and won by one and three quarter lengths from Bouncing Bowdler. Haggas commented that she had won "a bit easily" After the race she was sold to Roy Jackson's Pennsylvania-based Lael Stable after her connections received an offer that was reportedly "too good to refuse".

Her next target was the Weatherbys Super Sprint at Newbury. This race is restricted to two-year-olds who have been sold at auction, with the basic weights being set by the sale price. As Superstar Leo had been a relatively cheap yearling, the race was an obvious target. The race also attracted the Queen Mary Stakes winner Romantic Myth, who was made 10/11 favourite ahead of Superstar Leo on 9/2. Haggas admitted that he had avoided taking on Romantic Myth at levels at Royal Ascot, but was prepared to take her on with a five-pound weight advantage. Michael Hills held Superstar Leo up in the early stages before making a challenge in the last quarter mile. The filly took the lead and went clear, being driven out by Hills to win by three and a half lengths with Romantic Myth sixth. The winning time of 59.19 broke the track record by over a second.

All of Superstar Leo's starts so far had been at the minimum distance of five furlongs: in her next race she was moved up to six furlongs for the Group One Phoenix Stakes at Leopardstown in which her main rivals were expected to be the Cherry Hinton Stakes winner Dora Carrington and the Aidan O'Brien-trained colt Minardi. She had no chance with Minardi, who won by five lengths, but finished second of the ten runners. She was returned to five furlongs for her next race, the Flying Childers Stakes at Doncaster. She was made 2/1 favourite and led all the way to win the Group Two race by three-quarters of a length. Haggas paid tribute to the filly afterwards saying, "horses like her come around only rarely and we're very lucky to have her."

Two-year-old racehorses typically race against their own age group. The absence of Group One races restricted to two-year-olds over five furlongs however, has led some trainers to try their sprinting juveniles in open age competition. Notable successes for this strategy have included Sigy in the Prix de l'Abbaye de Longchamp and Lyric Fantasy in the Nunthorpe Stakes. This was the plan adopted by William Haggas for Superstar Leo, who was entered for the Prix de l'Abbaye. In the Longchamp race Superstar Leo was prominent from the start, and Michael Hills moved her up to take the lead at half way. A furlong out she was caught and overtaken by the Irish-trained four-year-old Namid but she ran on well to finish second, one and a half lengths behind Namid, but three lengths clear of the rest of the field which was headed by the Haydock Sprint Cup winner Pipalong. Haggas called her performance "a fantastic run" and added that he was "absolutely thrilled" with the filly.

=== 2001: three-year-old season ===
As a three-year-old, Superstar Leo failed to recapture he two-year-old form. She was unplaced behind Cassandra Go in the Temple Stakes (a "credtable" run according to the Telegraph) and the King's Stand Stakes, before being dropped down to Listed level to finish second in a race at Chester in July. A week later she finished fourth to Invincible Spirit in the Listed Hackwood Stakes before ending her career by running unplaced in the King George Stakes at Goodwood.

In August it was announced that she would be retired to stud.

== Race record ==
Date	Race	Dist (f)	Course	Class	Prize (£K)	Odds	Runners	Placing	Margin	Time	Jockey	Trainer
22 May 2000	EBF Maiden Stakes	5	Windsor	M	4	7/1	18	2	head	1:00.50	Frankie Dettori	William Haggas
2 June 2000	Stapleton Maiden Stakes	5	Catterick	M	2	4/11	12	1	0.75	1:00.80	Richard Quinn	William Haggas
9 June 2000	EBF Novice Stakes	5	Catterick		3	8/13	5	1	5	1:03.30	Richard Mullen	William Haggas
22 June 2000	Norfolk Stakes	5	Ascot	3	33	5/1	11	1	1.25	1:03.18	Richard Quinn	William Haggas
22 July 2000	Weatherbys Super Sprint	5	Nebury		72	5/1	22	1	3.5	0:59.19	Michael Hills	William Haggas
13 August 2000	Phoenix Stakes	6	Leopardstown	1	78	7/2	10	2	5	1:12.20	Michael Hills	William Haggas
9 September 2000	Flying Childers Stakes	5	Doncaster	2	27	2/1	11	1	0.75	0:59.32	Michael Hills	William Haggas
1 October 2000	Prix de l'Abbaye de Longchamp	5	Longchamp	1	48	41/10	11	2	1.5	0:55.10	Michael Hills	William Haggas
28 May 2001	Temple Stakes	5	Sandown	2	36	13/2	10	6	3.25	1:00.63	Michael Hills	William Haggas
19 June 2001	King's Stand Stakes	5	Ascot	2	82	20/1	22	14	6.75	1:00.49	Michael Hills	William Haggas
14 July 2001	Castle Walls Stakes	5	Chester	Listed	20	7/2	11	2	2.5	0:59.86	Richard Mullen	William Haggas
21 July 2001	Hackwood Stakes	6	Newbury	Listed	14	7/2	8	4	3.25	1:12.34	Michael Hills	William Haggas
31 July 2001	King George Stakes	5	Goodwood	3	30	15/2	15	11	5.5	0:57.78	Michael Hills	William Haggas

== Assessment ==
In the International Classification for 2000, Superstar Leo was rated on 123, making her officially the best two-year-old filly in Europe by a margin of seven pounds. Although her position at the head of the Classification was not controversial, some commentators felt that her actual rating was too high.

At the Cartier Racing Awards Superstar Leo was voted European Champion Two-Year-Old Filly.

== Breeding record ==
Since retiring to stud Superstar Leo has produced three winners including the Molecomb Stakes winner Enticing (by Pivotal).

== Pedigree ==
Pedigree of Superstar Leo (IRE), bay mare, 1998
Sire College Chapel (USA) 1990	Sharpo; 1977	Sharpen Up	Atan
Sire College Chapel (USA) 1990	Sharpo; 1977	Sharpen Up	Rocchetta
Sire College Chapel (USA) 1990	Sharpo; 1977	Moiety Bird	Falcon
Sire College Chapel (USA) 1990	Sharpo; 1977	Moiety Bird	Gaska
Sire College Chapel (USA) 1990	Scarcely Blessed; 1974	So Blessed	Princely Gift
Sire College Chapel (USA) 1990	Scarcely Blessed; 1974	So Blessed	Lavant
Sire College Chapel (USA) 1990	Scarcely Blessed; 1974	Parsimony	Parthia
Sire College Chapel (USA) 1990	Scarcely Blessed; 1974	Parsimony	Money For Nothing
Dam Council Rock (GB) 1985	General Assembly; 1976	Secretariat	Bold Ruler
Dam Council Rock (GB) 1985	General Assembly; 1976	Secretariat	Somethingroyal
Dam Council Rock (GB) 1985	General Assembly; 1976	Exclusive Dancer	Native Dancer
Dam Council Rock (GB) 1985	General Assembly; 1976	Exclusive Dancer	Exclusive
Dam Council Rock (GB) 1985	Dancing Rocks; 1979	Green Dancer	Nijinsky
Dam Council Rock (GB) 1985	Dancing Rocks; 1979	Green Dancer	Green Valley
Dam Council Rock (GB) 1985	Dancing Rocks; 1979	Croda Rossa	Grey Sovereign
Dam Council Rock (GB) 1985	Dancing Rocks; 1979	Croda Rossa	Crenelle (family 1-e)
