= Niche (horse) =

British-bred Thoroughbred racehorse

- Racing silks of Lady Carolyn Warren
- Sire: Risk Me
- Grandsire: Sharpo
- Dam: Cubby Hole
- Damsire: Town and Country
- Sex: Filly
- Foaled: 1990
- Country: Great Britain
- Colour: Chestnut
- Breeder: Highclere Stud
- Owner: Henry George Reginald Molyneux Herbert, 7th Earl of Carnarvon
- Trainer: Richard Hannon, Sr.
- Record: 10: 6-1-1
- Earnings: £171,726

Major wins
- Norfolk Stakes (1992); Lowther Stakes (1992); Nell Gwyn Stakes (1993); Falmouth Stakes (1993)

Awards
- Timeform rating: 117
- Last updated on May 14, 2009

Niche (foaled 1990) was a British Thoroughbred racehorse best known for winning the Group 3 classic trial the Nell Gwyn Stakes and coming 2nd in the 1,000 Guineas, before her career was cut short by a freak accident on the gallops.

Bred by Highclere Stud, Niche was owned by Lord Carnarvon - the Queen's racing manager, owner of top class fillies Lemon Souffle and Lyric Fantasy, and grandson of George Edward Stanhope Molyneux Herbert, 5th Earl of Carnarvon who discovered the tomb of Tutankhamun.

== Racing career ==
Trained by Richard Hannon, Sr., and ridden in all her races bar one by the (then) 57-year-old Lester Piggott, Niche started her career with three wins in a row, including the Group 3 Norfolk Stakes.

In her fourth race, the Cherry Hinton Stakes (one of the top 2yo filly races of the season) she met Sayyedati for the first time, finishing fourth carrying a penalty. These fillies would battle for honours throughout their two- and three-year-old careers. Before the end of her first season, Niche also went on to win the Group 2 Lowther Stakes over 6f.

At 3yo, Niche met Sayyedati in the classic trial the Nell Gwyn Stakes, beating her rival and placing her at the top of the betting for the 1,000 Guineas. Sayyedati hit back in the one mile fillies classic, beating Niche into 2nd when Lester Piggott reputedly felt that she became unbalanced in the Dip. Sayyedati would go on to win the Sussex Stakes and the Prix Jacques le Marios.

Niche went on to win the Group 2 Falmouth Stakes beating Dancing Bloom (Princess Royal Stakes) and Culture Vulture (Premio Emilio Turati, Prix Marcel Boussac, Fillies Mile), winning unchallenged in what would turn out to be her last race.

== Untimely Death ==
Whilst in training for the Prix Jacques Le Marois, Niche unseated her rider on the gallops, running into the road and collided with a van. She died almost immediately. Her trainer, Richard Hannon, Sr. said:

"'She caught the edge of the all-weather gallop, stumbled and went down, her lad going over the top. I went after her but then she crossed a minor road, which normally wouldn't see 10 cars between 7am and 4pm. It was a million to one chance. My blacksmith was travelling slowly up the road and the filly crashed into his van. She died within a minute. She was one of the best I've trained. I still cannot believe it's happened."

Lady Carolyn Warren, daughter of Lord Carnarvon, added:

"'She was such a gutsy filly, very brave and gave us a tremendous amount of pleasure. It is a major loss for us and must have been horrible for Richard Hannon to be at the scene."

== Pedigree ==
Niche is by Risk Me, British-trained French Champion 2yo and winner of the Prix Jean Prat, Grand Prix de Paris, Greenham Stakes and the National Stakes. He is also the sire of popular sprinter Branston Abby.

Cubby Hole, is a half sister to Ascot Gold Cup winner Little Wolf, but never raced. Niche is half sister to three winners: Wolf Mountain; Holetown; and, Ravine.

Pedigree of Niche
Sire Risk Me	Sharpo	Sharpen Up	Atan
Sire Risk Me	Sharpo	Sharpen Up	Rocchetta
Sire Risk Me	Sharpo	Moiety Bird	Falcon
Sire Risk Me	Sharpo	Moiety Bird	Gaska
Sire Risk Me	Run the Risk	Run the Gantlet	Tom Rolfe
Sire Risk Me	Run the Risk	Run the Gantlet	First Feather
Sire Risk Me	Run the Risk	Siliciana	Silly Season
Sire Risk Me	Run the Risk	Siliciana	Anippe
Dam Cubby Hole	Town and Country	Town Crier	Sovereign Path
Dam Cubby Hole	Town and Country	Town Crier	Corsley Bell
Dam Cubby Hole	Town and Country	First Huntress	Primera
Dam Cubby Hole	Town and Country	First Huntress	Welsh Huntress
Dam Cubby Hole	Hiding Place	Doutelle	Prince Chevalier
Dam Cubby Hole	Hiding Place	Doutelle	Above Board
Dam Cubby Hole	Hiding Place	Jojo	Vilmorin
Dam Cubby Hole	Hiding Place	Jojo	Fairy Jane
