= Gimcrack Stakes =

Flat horse race in Britain

- Class: Group 2
- Location: York Racecourse; York, England
- Inaugurated: 1846
- Race type: Flat
- Sponsor: Al Basti Equiworld
- Website: York

Race information
- Distance: 6f (1,207 metres)
- Surface: Turf
- Track: Straight
- Qualification: Two-year-old colts and geldings
- Weight: 9 st 2 lb Penalties; 3 lb for G1 / G2 winners
- Purse: £250,000 (2025); 1st: £141,775

The Gimcrack Stakes is a Group 2 flat horse race in Great Britain open to two-year-old colts and geldings. It is run at York over a distance of 6 furlongs (1,207 metres) and is scheduled to take place each year in August.

Entry into this "prestigious" race is often indicative of confidence in a horse's ability and potential.

Gimcrack Stakes
2026
Arapaho Gold	Final Objective	Hell Of A Spin

Previous years
2025
Lifeplan	Rock On Thunder	Do Or Do Not
2024
Cool Hoof Luke	Shadow Of Light	Symbol Of Strength
2023
Lake Forest	Johannes Brahms	King's Gamble
2022
Noble Style	Marshman	Cold Case
2021
Lusail	Gis A Sub	Twilight Jet

2020-2011
2020
Minzaal	Devilwala	Mystery Smiles
2019
Threat	Lord Of The Lodge	Repartee
2018
Emaraaty Ana	Legends Of War	Shine So Bright
2017
Sands Of Mali	Invincible Army	Cardsharp
2016
Blue Point	Mokarris	The Last Lion
2015
Ajaya	Ribchester	Raucous
2014
Muhaarar	Jungle Cat	Ahlan Emarati
2013
Astaire	Wilshire Boulevard	Parbold
2012
Blaine	Heavy Metal	Cay Verde
2011
Caspar Netscher	Lilbourne Lad	Burwaaz

2010-2001
2010
Approve	Crown Prosecutor	Sir Reginald
2009
Showcasing	Taajub	Monsieur Chevalier
2008
Shaweel	Master Noverre	Jobe
2007
Sir Gerry	Great Barrier Reef	Swiss Franc
2006
Conquest	Wi Dud	Bodes Galaxy
2005
Amadeus Wolf	Red Clubs	Assertive
2004
Tony James	Andronikos	Abraxas Antelope
2003
Balmont	Fokine	Grand Reward
2002
Country Reel	Mister Links	Membership
2001
Rock Of Gibraltar	Ho Choi	Twilight Blues

2000-1991
2000
Bannister	Zilch	Juniper
1999
Mull Of Kintyre	Ma Yoram	Bally Pride
1998
Josr Algarhoud	Sailing Shoes	Thunder Dragon
1997
Carrowkeel	Bold Fact	Headhunter
1996
Abou Zouz	Compton Place	The West
1995
Royal Applause	Tumbleweed Ridge	Take A Left
1994
Chilly Billy	Fallow	Moon King
1993
Turtle Island	Unblest	Torch Rouge
1992
Splendent	Green's Bid	Silver Wizard
1991
River Falls	Taylor Quigley	Prince Ferdinand

1990-1988
1990
Mujtahid	Vintage Only	Mystiko
1989
Rock City	Book The Band	Swiss Affair
1988
Sharp N' Early	Luge	Weldnaas

== History ==
The event is named after Gimcrack, a successful racehorse in the 18th century. Gimcrack won twenty-seven times in a career of thirty-six races, but none of his victories was achieved at York.

The Gimcrack Stakes was established in 1846, and it was originally open to horses of either gender. It was restricted to male horses in 1987.

The race is currently staged on the third day of York's four-day Ebor Festival meeting.

The owner of the winning horse is traditionally invited to give a speech at the annual Gimcrack Dinner, which is held at the racecourse in December.

== Records ==
Leading jockey (9 wins):

- John Osborne, Jr. – Exact (1852), Coastguard (1863), Wild Agnes (1864), Lord of the Vale (1865), Bothwell (1870), Thorn (1872), Holy Friar (1874), Constantine (1876), Simnel (1880)

Leading trainer (7 wins):

- William I'Anson, Jr. – Pursebearer (1881), Castor (1885), Lady Muncaster (1886), Derwentwater (1887), Lockhart (1889), Royal Stag (1890), Barbette (1903)

== Winners since 1900 ==
Year	Winner	Jockey	Trainer	Time
1900	Garb Or	Kempton Cannon	Tom Cannon Jr.
1901	Sterling Balm	Danny Maher	John Watts	1:14.60
1902	Chaucer	Danny Maher	George Lambton	1:15.20
1903	Barbette		William I'Anson jr.
1904	Desiree	William Lane	Peter Gilpin
1905	Colonia	Herbert Jones	Jack Robinson
1906	Polar Star	Barry Lynham	Jack Robinson
1907	Royal Realm	Barry Lynham	Jack Robinson
1908	Blankney II	Billy Higgs	Dawson Waugh
1909	Lily Rose	Barry Lynham	Fergusson
1910	Pietri	Danny Maher	John Watson
1911	Lomond	Frank Wootton	Richard Wootton	1:14.40
1912	Flippant	William Saxby	Richard Wootton
1913	Stornoway	Frank Wootton	Richard Wootton	1:12.80
	no race 1914-1918
1919	Southern	Freddie Fox	Reg Day
1920	Polemarch	Fred Lane	Robert Dewhurst	1:12.40
1921	Scamp	Fred Lane	Fred Templeman	1:12.80
1922	Town Guard	George Archibald	Peter Gilpin	1:15.80
1923	Sansovino	Tommy Weston	George Lambton	1:16.20
1924	Game Shot	Frank Bullock	Norman Scobie	1:15.80
1925	Lex	Michael Beary	Reg Day	1:12.60
1926	Bold Archer	Harry Wragg	Ralph Moreton	1:15.00
1927	Black Watch	Gordon Richards	Peter Gilpin	1:21.20
1928	The Black Abbott	Gordon Richards	Fred Darling	1:15.60
1929	Roral	Dick Perryman	Atty Persse	1:13.60
1930	Four Course	Freddie Fox	Fred Darling	1:14.00
1931	Miracle	Harry Wragg	Jack Jarvis	1:14.20
1932	Young Lover	Dick Perryman	Frank Butters	1:14.00
1933	Mrs Rustom	Michael Beary	Frank Butters	1:12.40
1934	Bahram	Dick Perryman	Frank Butters	1:12.60
1935	Paul Beg	Herbert Gunn	William Easterby	1:13.80
1936	Goya	Charlie Elliott	George Lambton	1:13.40
1937	Golden Sovereign	Tommy Weston	Harry Cottrill	1:13.00
1938	Cockpit	Dick Perryman	Colledge Leader	1:12.20
1939	Tant Mieux	Gordon Richards	Fred Darling	1:13.20
	no race 1940-1944
1945	Gulf Stream	Harry Wragg	Walter Earl	1:11.40
1946	Petition	Harry Wragg	Frank Butters	1:13.60
1947	Black Tarquin	Harry Carr	Cecil Boyd-Rochfort	1:10.60
1948	Star King (Note: Star King was later renamed Star Kingdom)	Sam Wragg	Jack Waugh	1:13.00
1949	Palestine	Gordon Richards	Frank Butters	1:13.40
1950	Cortil	Rae Johnstone	Charles Semblat	1:14.60
1951	Windy City	Gordon Richards	Paddy Prendergast	1:11.40
1952	Bebe Grand	Willie Snaith	Sam Armstrong	1:11.80
1953	The Pie King	Gordon Richards	Paddy Prendergast	1:12.80
1954	Precast	Billy Nevett	Dick Peacock	1:21.60
1955	Idle Rocks	Doug Smith	Geoffrey Brooke	1:12.20
1956	Eudaemon	Edgar Britt	Charles Elsey	1:16.80
1957	Pheidippides	Doug Smith	Charles Elsey	1:17.60
1958	Be Careful	Edward Hide	Charles Elsey	1:14.00
1959	Paddy's Sister	George Moore	Paddy Prendergast	1:12.20
1960	Test Case	Eddie Larkin	Jack Jarvis	1:15.20
1961	Sovereign Lord	Scobie Breasley	Gordon Smyth	1:15.20
1962	Crocket	Doug Smith	Geoffrey Brooke	1:14.40
1963	Talahasse	Lester Piggott	Atty Corbett	1:14.00
1964	Double Jump	Jimmy Lindley	Jeremy Tree	1:15.20
1965	Young Emperor	Lester Piggott	Paddy Prendergast	1:13.60
1966	Golden Horus	Joe Mercer	Bill O'Gorman	1:15.40
1967	Petingo	Lester Piggott	Sam Armstrong	1:15.00
1968	Tudor Music	Frankie Durr	Michael Jarvis	1:13.00
1969	Yellow God	Frankie Durr	Paul Davey	1:14.00
1970	Mill Reef	Geoff Lewis	Ian Balding	1:17.80
1971	Wishing Star	Frankie Durr	Paul Davey	1:16.00
1972	Rapid River	Tommy Kelsey	Arthur Stephenson	1:12.50
1973	Giacometti	Tony Murray	Ryan Price	1:14.30
1974	Steel Heart	Lester Piggott	Dermot Weld	1:12.75
1975	Music Boy	Johnny Seagrave	Snowy Wainwright	1:12.46
1976	Nebbiolo	Gabriel Curran	Kevin Prendergast	1:12.54
1977	Tumbledownwind	Geoff Lewis	Bruce Hobbs	1:17.37
1978	Stanford	Pat Eddery	Neville Callaghan	1:13.81
1979	Sonnen Gold	Mark Birch	Peter Easterby	1:15.15
1980	Bel Bolide	Pat Eddery	Jeremy Tree	1:16.03
1981	Full Extent	John Lowe	Steve Norton	1:16.73
1982	Horage	Tony Murray	Matt McCormack	1:13.75
1983	Precocious	Lester Piggott	Henry Cecil	1:11.88
1984	Doulab	Tony Murray	Harry Thomson Jones	1:11.30
1985	Stalker	Joe Mercer	Peter Walwyn	1:15.01
1986	Wiganthorpe	Willie Carson	Mick Easterby	1:11.85
1987	Reprimand	Steve Cauthen	Henry Cecil	1:15.10
1988	Sharp N' Early	Brian Rouse	Richard Hannon Sr.	1:09.84
1989	Rock City	Willie Carson	Richard Hannon Sr.	1:10.97
1990	Mujtahid	Willie Carson	Robert Armstrong	1:10.55
1991	River Falls	Bruce Raymond	Richard Hannon Sr.	1:13.72
1992	Splendent	Alan Munro	Paul Cole	1:11.42
1993	Turtle Island	John Reid	Peter Chapple-Hyam	1:13.49
1994	Chilly Billy	Kieren Fallon	Lynda Ramsden	1:12.78
1995	Royal Applause	Walter Swinburn	Barry Hills	1:11.42
1996	Abou Zouz	Frankie Dettori	David Loder	1:10.78
1997	Carrowkeel	Pat Eddery	Barry Hills	1:13.39
1998	Josr Algarhoud	Kieren Fallon	Mick Channon	1:10.28
1999	Mull of Kintyre	Michael Kinane	Aidan O'Brien	1:11.51
2000	Bannister	Johnny Murtagh	Richard Hannon Sr.	1:12.50
2001	Rock of Gibraltar	Michael Kinane	Aidan O'Brien	1:11.23
2002	Country Reel	Frankie Dettori	David Loder	1:12.61
2003	Balmont	Pat Eddery	Jeremy Noseda	1:11.07
2004	Tony James	Seb Sanders	Clive Brittain	1:14.30
2005	Amadeus Wolf	Neil Callan	Kevin Ryan	1:09.75
2006	Conquest	Jimmy Fortune	William Haggas	1:11.81
2007	Sir Gerry	Jamie Spencer	James Fanshawe	1:14.16
2008 (Note: The 2008 running took place at Newbury)	Shaweel	Greg Fairley	Mark Johnston	1:13.92
2009	Showcasing	Jimmy Fortune	John Gosden	1:09.28
2010	Approve	Eddie Ahern	William Haggas	1:11.67
2011	Caspar Netscher	Robert Winston	Alan McCabe	1:12.74
2012	Blaine	Phillip Makin	Kevin Ryan	1:11.53
2013	Astaire	Neil Callan	Kevin Ryan	1:13.72
2014	Muhaarar	Paul Hanagan	Charles Hills	1:10.52
2015	Ajaya	Graham Gibbons	William Haggas	1:10.84
2016	Blue Point	William Buick	Charlie Appleby	1:09.00
2017	Sands of Mali	Paul Hanagan	Richard Fahey	1:11.16
2018	Emaraaty Ana	Frankie Dettori	Kevin Ryan	1:10.79
2019	Threat	Oisin Murphy	Richard Hannon Jr.	1:09.62
2020	Minzaal	Jim Crowley	Owen Burrows	1:11.21
2021	Lusail	Pat Dobbs	Richard Hannon Jr.	1:10.13
2022	Noble Style	William Buick	Charlie Appleby	1:10.51
2023	Lake Forest	Tom Marquand	William Haggas	1:09.91
2024	Cool Hoof Luke	Oisin Murphy	Andrew Balding	1:10.78
2025	Lifeplan	Zak Wheatley	Declan Carroll	1:09.79
2026	Arapaho Gold	Connor Beasley	Michael Dods	1:12.89

== Earlier winners ==
- 1846: Ellerdale
- 1847: Tuscan
- 1848: Glauca
- 1849: Mildew
- 1850: Aaron Smith
- 1851: Trousseau
- 1852: Exact
- 1853: Barrel
- 1854: Nettle
- 1855: Mirage
- 1856: Blink Bonny
- 1857: Princess Royal
- 1858: Rainbow
- 1859: Thormanby
- 1860: Prudence
- 1861: Johnny Armstrong
- 1862: Le Marechal
- 1863: Coastguard
- 1864: Wild Agnes
- 1865: Lord of the Vale
- 1866: Blinkhoolie
- 1867: The Earl
- 1868: Lady Dewhurst
- 1869: Hester
- 1870: Bothwell
- 1871: Lilian
- 1872: Thorn
- 1873: Padoroshna
- 1874: Holy Friar
- 1875: Springfield
- 1876: Constantine
- 1877: King Olaf
- 1878: Amice
- 1879: Duke of Cumberland
- 1880: Simnel
- 1881: Pursebearer
- 1882: The Golden Farmer
- 1883: Juventus
- 1884: Thuringian Queen
- 1885: Castor
- 1886: Lady Muncaster
- 1887: Derwentwater
- 1888: Cheroot
- 1889: Lockhart
- 1890: Royal Stag
- 1891: Therapia
- 1892: Peppercorn
- 1893: Styx
- 1894: Bentworth
- 1895: Amphora
- 1896: Silver Fox
- 1897: Mauchline
- 1898: Queen Fairy
- 1899: Dusky Queen

== See also ==
- Horse racing in Great Britain
- List of British flat horse races
