= Minardi (horse) =

American-bred Thoroughbred racehorse

- Sire: Boundary
- Grandsire: Danzig
- Dam: Yarn
- Damsire: Mr. Prospector
- Sex: Stallion
- Foaled: 3 May 1998
- Country: United States
- Colour: Brown
- Breeder: Indian Creek
- Owner: Michael Tabor & Sue Magnier
- Trainer: Aidan O'Brien
- Record: 8: 2-1-1
- Earnings: £201,940

Major wins
- Phoenix Stakes (2000); Middle Park Stakes (2000)

Awards
- Top-rated European two-year-old (2000)

Minardi (3 May 1998 – 30 October 2012) was an American-bred, Irish-trained Thoroughbred racehorse and sire. He was the top-rated European two-year-old in 2000 when he recovered from a defeat on his debut to win the Phoenix Stakes and the Middle Park Stakes. In the following year he finished fourth in the 2000 Guineas and third in the Irish 2,000 Guineas. He was retired to stud but had limited success as a breeding stallion.

== Background ==
Minardi was a brown horse with a white blaze bred in Kentucky by Indian Creek. He was sired by Boundary, a Kentucky-bred stallion who won six of his eight races including Grade III victories in the Roseben Handicap and the A Phenomenon Handicap. As a breeding stallion he is best known as the sire of Big Brown. Minardi's dam yarn won one minor race but became a very successful broodmare who also produced Tale of the Cat (King's Bishop Stakes) and Myth, the dam of Johannesburg. As a descendant of the broodmare Feola, she came from the same branch of Thoroughbred family 2-f which has produced numerous major winners including Round Table, Pebbles Nashwan and Deep Impact.

As a yearling the colt was offered for sale at the Keeneland September sale and was bought for $1.65 million by the bloodstock agent Dermot "Demi" O'Byrne on behalf of John Magnier's Coolmore organisation. He was sent to Europe and entered training with Aidan O'Brien at Ballydoyle. Like may Coolmore horses the details of the colt's ownership changed from race to race: he was sometimes listed as being owned by Michael Tabor whilst on others occasions he ran for the partnership of Tabor and Sue Magnier. He was ridden in all but two of his races by Mick Kinane.

== Racing career ==
=== 2000: two-year-old season ===
Minardi was sent to England for his racecourse debut and started 5/4 favourite for a six furlong maiden race at Ascot Racecourse on 29 July. He proved no match for the Paul Cole-trained Rumpold and finished second, beaten five lengths. Despite his defeat the colt was stepped up sharply in class for the Group One Phoenix Stakes at Leopardstown Racecourse two weeks later. He had not been an intended runner in the race but took his place after his more highly regarded stablemate Freud was withdrawn. The filly Dora Carrington (winner of the Cherry Hinton Stakes) started 5/2 favourite with Minardi joint second choice in the betting on 7/2 alongside Superstar Leo. Kinane settled the colt in fourth as the outsider Longueville Legend set the pace before moving up to take the lead a furlong and a half from the finish. He accelerated clear of his rivals in the closing stages to win by five lengths from Superstar Leo despite being eased down by Kinane in the final strides. The runner-up was later voted Cartier Champion Two-year-old Filly for 2000. His victory was described as "a stunning display" by the Racing Post. After the race Aidan O'Brien commented "Ascot was a blip on Minardi's record. He'd always worked very well and we thought he would burn up the course. Minardi will now have a break before coming back for the Dewhurst and similar races.

On 28 September Minardi was sent back to England for the Middle Park Stakes at Newmarket Racecourse and started the 5/6 favourite in a ten runner field. His principal rivals appeared to be Bad As I Wanna Be (Prix Morny), Endless Summer (Richmond Stakes) and Baaridd (Ripon Champion Two Years Old Trophy) whilst the other runners included Bannister (Gimcrack Stakes), Ghayth (third in the Champagne Stakes), Pomfret Lad (runner-up in the Mill Reef Stakes) and Bram Stoker (runner-up in the Coventry Stakes). Minardi started slowly and raced towards the rear of the field as the early pace was set by the outsiders Joplin and Red Carpet. The favourite made rapid progress to take the lead approaching the final furlong and stayed on to win by one and a half lengths and won by one and a half lengths from Endless Summer, with Red Carpet taking third ahead of Bad As I Wanna Be. According to the Racing Post he "outclassed one of the most competitive Middle Park fields we've seen in recent years". British bookmakers responded by making the colt favourite for the following year's 2000 Guineas Endless Summer was later disqualified in unusual circumstances when it was revealed that he had been foaled prematurely on 27 December 1997: he was therefore technically a three-year-old and ineligible to contest the race.

It was expected that Minardi would end his season in the Dewhurst Stakes over seven furlongs at Newmarket but was ruled out of the race after showing signs of respiratory infection.

In the official International Classification for 2000, Minardi was rated the best two-year-old colt in Europe.

=== 2001: three-year-old season ===
On his first appearance of the 2001 season, Minardi was sent to England again to contest the 2000 Guineas over Newmarket's Rowley Mile course on 5 May and started the 5/1 second favourite behind Tobougg in an eighteen-runner field. After being held up in the early stages he struggled to obtain a clear run in the final furlong before staying on to finish fourth behind Golan, Tamburlaine and Frenchmans Bay. Three weeks later he started 2/1 favourite for the Irish 2,000 Guineas at the Curragh but after taking second place in the straight he was unable to make further progress and finished third behind his stablemates Black Minnaloushe and Mozart.

Minardi made little impact in three subsequent races starting with the St James's Palace Stakes in which he finished eighth behind Black Minnaloushe. He was then moved back to sprint distances and finished sixth in the Prix Maurice de Gheest and ninth in the Haydock Sprint Cup.

== Stud record ==
At the end of his racing career Minardi was retired to become a breeding stallion. He stood in Europe and North America before being exported to New Zealand in 2006. He died on 30 October 2012. The best of his progeny were My Sweet Baby (Premio Regina Elena) and Ballet Pacifica (Prix Madame Jean Coturie).

== Pedigree ==
Pedigree of Minardi (USA), bay stallion, 1998
Sire Boundary (USA) 1990	Danzig (USA); 1977	Northern Dancer	Nearctic
Sire Boundary (USA) 1990	Danzig (USA); 1977	Northern Dancer	Natalma
Sire Boundary (USA) 1990	Danzig (USA); 1977	Pas de Nom	Admiral's Voyage
Sire Boundary (USA) 1990	Danzig (USA); 1977	Pas de Nom	Petitioner
Sire Boundary (USA) 1990	Edge (USA); 1978	Damascus	Sword Dancer
Sire Boundary (USA) 1990	Edge (USA); 1978	Damascus	Kerala
Sire Boundary (USA) 1990	Edge (USA); 1978	Ponte Vecchio	Round Table
Sire Boundary (USA) 1990	Edge (USA); 1978	Ponte Vecchio	Terentia
Dam Yarn (USA) 1987	Mr. Prospector (USA); 1970	Raise a Native	Native Dancer
Dam Yarn (USA) 1987	Mr. Prospector (USA); 1970	Raise a Native	Raise You
Dam Yarn (USA) 1987	Mr. Prospector (USA); 1970	Gold Digger	Nashua
Dam Yarn (USA) 1987	Mr. Prospector (USA); 1970	Gold Digger	Sequence
Dam Yarn (USA) 1987	Narrate (USA); 1980	Honest Pleasure	What A Pleasure
Dam Yarn (USA) 1987	Narrate (USA); 1980	Honest Pleasure	Tularia
Dam Yarn (USA) 1987	Narrate (USA); 1980	State	Nijinsky
Dam Yarn (USA) 1987	Narrate (USA); 1980	State	Monarchy (Family: 2-f)
