= Tiggy Wiggy =

Thoroughbred racehorse

- Racing silks of Potensis Limited
- Sire: Kodiac
- Grandsire: Danehill
- Dam: Kheleyf's Silver
- Damsire: Kheleyf
- Sex: Filly
- Foaled: 7 March 2012
- Country: Ireland
- Colour: Bay
- Breeder: CBS Bloodstock
- Owner: Potensis Ltd & Elaine Chivers; Potensis Ltd, Chris Giles & Merriebelle Stable
- Trainer: Richard Hannon Jr.
- Record: 11: 6-2-2
- Earnings: £431,754

Major wins
- National Stakes (2014); Weatherbys Super Sprint (2014); Lowther Stakes (2014); Cheveley Park Stakes (2014)

Awards
- Cartier Champion Two-year-old Filly (2014); Top-rated European two-year-old filly (2014)

Tiggy Wiggy (foaled 7 March 2012) is an Irish-bred, British-trained Thoroughbred racehorse. In 2014, she won six out of eight races including the Weatherbys Super Sprint, Lowther Stakes and Cheveley Park Stakes and was voted Cartier Champion Two-year-old Filly. In the spring of 2015 she was tried over longer distances and finished third in the 1000 Guineas.

== Background ==
Tiggy Wiggy is a bay filly with a narrow white blaze and a white sock on her right hind leg bred in Ireland by CBS Bloodstock. She was sired by Kodiac, a sprinter who won four minor races from twenty starts and finished second in the Hackwood Stakes and fourth in the Prix Maurice de Gheest. Tiggy Wiggy is the second known foal of her dam Kheleyf's Silver, who won a maiden race at Windsor Racecourse in 2008 on the last of her four racecourse appearances.

In August 2013, the filly was consigned by the Ballyphilip Stud to the Doncaster Premier Yearling sale where she was bought for £41,000 by Peter & Ross Doyle Bloodstock. During her racing career she has been owned by Potensis Ltd with a variety of partners. Tiggy Wiggy was sent into training with Richard Hannon Jr. at his Herridge Racing Stables, near Marlborough, Wiltshire.

== Racing career ==
=== 2014: two-year-old season ===
Tiggy Wiggy was ridden in her first three races by Sean Levey. She made her racecourse debut in a five furlong maiden race on the synthetic Polytrack surface at Kempton Park Racecourse on 29 March. Starting the 8/13 favourite, she led from the start and drew away from her eight opponents in the last quarter mile to win by seven lengths despite being eased down by Levey in the closing stages. Five weeks later she made her first appearance on turf at Salisbury Racecourse and won by one and a half lengths from Exentricity after leading from the start. The filly was then moved up in class for the Listed Marygate Stakes at York Racecourse and sustained her first defeat, beaten half a length by the Welsh-trained filly Patience Alexander.

Richard Hughes, took over from Levey as Tiggy Wiggy's jockey after her defeat at York, and rode her in her remaining five races in 2014. At the end of May, the filly was matched against colts for the first time in the Listed National Stakes over five furlongs at Sandown Park. After racing in third place she took the lead inside the final furlong and accelerated clear to win by almost four lengths from the Brocklesby Stakes winner Cock of the North. At Royal Ascot in June the filly was again moved up in class for the Group Three Queen Mary Stakes and started third favourite behind the Irish filly Anthem Alexander and the Wesley Ward-trained American challenger Spanish Pipedream. She was always among the leaders before challenging inside the final furlong but was beaten a neck by Anthem Alexander. In July at Newbury Racecourse, Tiggy Wiggy started the 5/2 favourite against twenty-three opponents in the Weatherby's Super Sprint, a race for two-year-olds old at public auction, with the weights being determined by the sale price. Carrying top weight of 127 pounds, she led from the start and quickened away from her rivals approaching the final furlong to win by six lengths from Haxby.

In August, Tiggy Wiggy faced Anthem Alexander and the Albany Stakes winner Cursory Glance in the Group Two Lowther Stakes over six furlongs at York, after Hannon had considered running the filly against older horses in the Nunthorpe Stakes. Starting the 15/8 favourite, she led from the start and won by one and a half lengths and three quarters of a length from Cursory Glance and Anthem Alexander in a new track record time, with a gap of five lengths back to the other six runners. After the race Hannon said "She's very, very good. She's always been the sort of filly who draws a gasp and I thought she looked magnificent going out on to the course" but admitted that she was most unlikely to stay further. The form of the Lowther Stakes was subsequently boosted when Cursory Glance won the Group One Moyglare Stud Stakes at the Curragh. On 27 September, Tiggy Wiggy moved up to Group One level for the first time for the Cheveley Park Stakes at Newmarket Racecourse and started the 6/4 favourite against eight opponents. Her main rivals appeared to be Anthem Alexander, the Prix d'Arenberg winner High Celebrity and the John Gosden-trained Tendu. As usual, Tiggy Wiggy started quickly and led from the start before accelerating in the last quarter mile. She won by three quarters of a length from Anthem Alexander, with High Celebrity a length and a quarter back in third place. Plans to run the filly against older horses in the Prix de l'Abbaye in France a week later were abandoned and she was retired for the season.

=== 2015: three-year-old season ===
On her first appearance as a three-year-old, Tiggy Wiggy was tried over seven furlongs in the Fred Darling Stakes at Newbury in April. She started favourite but finished third behind Redstart and Jellicle Ball. Richard Hannon commented: "Richard Hughes said she wouldn't have won at five, six or seven furlongs today... she probably did get the trip but she has run a little bit lacklustre and below expectations". Tiggy Wiggy faced Redstart and Jellicle Ball again, as well as ten other fillies when she contested the 202nd running of the 1000 Guineas at Newmarket on 3 May. She produced a much better performance, disputing the lead for most of the way before finishing third behind the Irish-trained Legatissimo and Lucida.

Tiggy Wiggy returned to sprinting in June and started at odds of 6/1 for the inaugural Commonwealth Cup. After being in touch with the leaders in the early stages she weakened in the last quarter mile and was eased down by Hughes to finish sixteenth of the eighteen runners behind Muhaarar.

== Assessment and awards ==
In November Tiggy Wiggy was named Champion Two-year-old Filly at the Cartier Racing Awards. In the International Classification she was ranked the equal-best two-year-old filly to race in Europe, level with Found and two pounds behind the top colt Belardo.

== Pedigree ==
Pedigree of Tiggy Wiggy (IRE), bay filly, 2012
Sire Kodiac (GB) 2001	Danehill (USA); 1986	Danzig	Northern Dancer
Sire Kodiac (GB) 2001	Danehill (USA); 1986	Danzig	Pas de Nom
Sire Kodiac (GB) 2001	Danehill (USA); 1986	Razyana	His Majesty
Sire Kodiac (GB) 2001	Danehill (USA); 1986	Razyana	Spring Adieu
Sire Kodiac (GB) 2001	Rafha (GB); 1987	Kris	Sharpen Up
Sire Kodiac (GB) 2001	Rafha (GB); 1987	Kris	Doubly Sure
Sire Kodiac (GB) 2001	Rafha (GB); 1987	Eljazzi	Artaius
Sire Kodiac (GB) 2001	Rafha (GB); 1987	Eljazzi	Border Bounty
Dam Kheleyf's Silver (IRE) 2006	Kheleyf (USA); 2001	Green Desert	Danzig
Dam Kheleyf's Silver (IRE) 2006	Kheleyf (USA); 2001	Green Desert	Foreign Courier
Dam Kheleyf's Silver (IRE) 2006	Kheleyf (USA); 2001	Society Lay	Mr. Prospector
Dam Kheleyf's Silver (IRE) 2006	Kheleyf (USA); 2001	Society Lay	La Voyageuse
Dam Kheleyf's Silver (IRE) 2006	Silver Arrow (USA); 1997	Shadeed	Nijinsky
Dam Kheleyf's Silver (IRE) 2006	Silver Arrow (USA); 1997	Shadeed	Continual
Dam Kheleyf's Silver (IRE) 2006	Silver Arrow (USA); 1997	Aneesati	Kris
Dam Kheleyf's Silver (IRE) 2006	Silver Arrow (USA); 1997	Aneesati	Dabaweyaa (Family 14-c)

- Tiggy Wiggy is inbred 3 x 4 to Danzig and Kris, meaning that these stallions appear in both the third and fourth generations of her pedigree.
