= Stalker (horse) =

British-bred Thoroughbred racehorse

- Sire: Kala Shikari
- Grandsire: Huntercombe
- Dam: Tarvie
- Damsire: Swing Easy
- Sex: Stallion
- Foaled: 9 March 1983
- Country: United Kingdom
- Colour: Bay
- Breeder: Paddy Fetherston-Godley
- Owner: Paddy Fetherston-Godley
- Trainer: Peter Walwyn
- Record: 11: 4-1-2

Major wins
- Gimcrack Stakes (1985); Middle Park Stakes (1985)

Awards
- Timeform rating 121 (1985)

Stalker (9 March 1983 – after 2002) was a British Thoroughbred racehorse and sire. After failing to sell as a yearling he became a very successful racehorse as a two-year-old in 1985. He won four of his eight races that year including the Gimcrack Stakes and the Middle Park Stakes and was also placed in the Richmond Stakes and the Mill Reef Stakes. He failed to show any worthwhile form as a three-year-old and was retired from racing. He stood as a breeding stallion in Ireland and Cyprus with limited success.

== Background ==
Stalker was a small, dark bay horse bred in England by his owner Paddy Fetherston-Godley. He was one of the best horses sired by Kala Shikari a sprinter whose wins included the Prix de Seine-et-Oise and the Prix du Gros Chêne in 1976. Stalker was the first foal of his dam Tarvie, a sprinter who won three races over six furlongs and who was rated 101 by Timeform in 1980. She was descended from the broodmare Distant View, making her a distant relative of the Irish classic race winners Front Row, Black Satin and Possessive Dancer.

As a yearling the colt was entered in the Newmarket Autumn Sale but failed to reach his reserve price and was returned to his breeder. The colt raced in the colours of Fetherston-Godley and was trained by Peter Walwyn at his Seven Barrows stud near Lambourn in Berkshire.

== Racing career ==
=== 1985: two-year-old season ===
Stalker made a successful racecourse debut in a five furlong maiden race at Lingfield Park in May and followed up with a victory over the same distance in a minor race at Newbury Racecourse a month later. After finishing third in the Chesterfield Stakes at Newmarket he was moved up in class and distance for the Group Two Richmond Stakes over six furlongs at Goodwood Racecourse on 31 July. Ridden by the fifty-year-old veteran Joe Mercer he started a 25/1 outsider but finished third of the ten runners behind Nomination and Green Desert. In August he was tried over seven furlongs in the Group Three Seaton Delaval Stakes at Newcastle Racecourse. Stalker raced in second place and looked a likely winner a quarter of a mile from the finish but then began to struggle and finished fourth behind Moorgate Man, Bold Arrangement (later to finish second in the 1986 Kentucky Derby) and Firm Landing. Having apparently failed to stay the distance at Newcastle, the colt was brought back to six furlongs for the Gimcrack Stakes at York Racecourse on 21 August. He was the 17/2 fourth choice in the betting behind the filly Storm Star (winner of the Cherry Hinton Stakes) and the colts Prince Pecadillo and Lochonica (first and second in the Cock of the North Stakes at Haydock Park) in what appeared to be a substandard field for the Group Two event. With Mercer again in the saddle he took the lead from the start and set a strong pace, showing what Timeform described as "blistering speed" and drawing away in the closing stages to win by four lengths from Storm Star.

In the Mill Reef Stakes at Newbury on 21 September Stalker started at odds of 10/1 in a nine-runner field headed by Green Desert. Mercer sent him into the lead from the start and he led for most of the way before being overtaken in the closing stages and beaten three quarters of a length by Luqman. The winner, who was also trained by Peter Walwyn, was receiving four pounds in weight from the runner-up. Stalker and Luqman met again in the Group One Middle Park Stakes over six furlongs at Newmarket on 5 October. The Harry Thomson Jones-trained Alkaaseh started the 6/4 favourite with Stalker next in the betting on 9/2 ahead of Luqman and Silvino (third in the Royal Lodge Stakes) with the other two runners being Pop the Cork and Laird o' Montrose. Stalker led from the start and never looked in any danger of defeat, winning by two and a half lengths from and half a length from Silvino and Laird o' Montrose. The colt's win was the last major success for Joe Mercer, who retired for the end of the year.

=== 1986: three-year-old season ===
Stalker make three appearances as a three-year-old on his debut but never looked likely to reproduce his juvenile form. After finishing fourth on his debut and unplaced in his next start he was sent to Royal Ascot for the King's Stand Stakes over five furlongs on 20 June. Ridden by Paul Eddery he started at odds of 16/1 and finished last of the fourteen runners behind Last Tycoon.

== Assessment ==
In the official International Classification for the European two-year-olds of 1985 Stalker was rated eight pounds behind the top-rated Bakharoff. The independent Timeform organisation gave him a rating of 121, eleven pounds behind Huntingdale, who was rated their best juvenile. In their annual Racehorses of 1985 Timeform described him as "thoroughly game and dependable" but suggested that his small size and excitable temperament made him unlikely to make into a top-class three-year-old.

== Stud record ==
Stalker was retired at the end of his three-year-old season and became a breeding stallion at the Rossenarra Stud in County Kilkenny. He was exported to Cyprus in 1991 and his last foals were born in 2003. He sired several minor winners both on the flat and under National Hunt rules, but no top class performers.

== Pedigree ==
Pedigree of Stalker (GB), bay stallion, 1983
| Sire Kala Shikari (IRE) 1973 | Huntercombe (GB); 1967 | Derring-Do | Darius |
| Sire Kala Shikari (IRE) 1973 | Huntercombe (GB); 1967 | Derring-Do | Sipsey Bridge |
| Sire Kala Shikari (IRE) 1973 | Huntercombe (GB); 1967 | Ergina | Fair Trial |
| Sire Kala Shikari (IRE) 1973 | Huntercombe (GB); 1967 | Ergina | Ballechin |
| Sire Kala Shikari (IRE) 1973 | Vigour (IRE); 1961 | Vilmorin | Gold Bridge |
| Sire Kala Shikari (IRE) 1973 | Vigour (IRE); 1961 | Vilmorin | Queen of the Meadows |
| Sire Kala Shikari (IRE) 1973 | Vigour (IRE); 1961 | Pompienne | Eble |
| Sire Kala Shikari (IRE) 1973 | Vigour (IRE); 1961 | Pompienne | Pomelane |
| Dam Tarvie (GB) 1977 | Swing Easy (USA); 1968 | Delta Judge | Traffic Judge |
| Dam Tarvie (GB) 1977 | Swing Easy (USA); 1968 | Delta Judge | Beautillion |
| Dam Tarvie (GB) 1977 | Swing Easy (USA); 1968 | Free Flowing | Polynesian |
| Dam Tarvie (GB) 1977 | Swing Easy (USA); 1968 | Free Flowing | Rytina |
| Dam Tarvie (GB) 1977 | Tamergene (GB); 1968 | Tamerlane | Persian Gulf |
| Dam Tarvie (GB) 1977 | Tamergene (GB); 1968 | Tamerlane | Eastern Empress |
| Dam Tarvie (GB) 1977 | Tamergene (GB); 1968 | Epigene | Epaulette |
| Dam Tarvie (GB) 1977 | Tamergene (GB); 1968 | Epigene | Midsummer Hill (Family:42) |
