= Tony Murray (jockey) =

English jockey (1950–1992)

Personal information
- Born: 18 February 1950 Wantage, Berkshire, England
- Died: 6 January 1992 (aged 41)
- Occupation: Jockey

Horse racing career
- Sport: Horse racing

Major racing wins
- British Classic Races: St Leger Stakes (1975); Oaks Stakes (1972); Other major races: British Champions Sprint Stakes (1985); Fillies' Mile (1982); Nunthorpe Stakes (1973); Champion Stakes (1980); Irish 1,000 Guineas (1980, 1985); Prix de l'Abbaye de Longchamp (1973); Irish Derby (1980); Grand Prix de Paris (1984); Falmouth Stakes (1985); Coronation Stakes (1980, 1985); Eclipse Stakes (1979)

Significant horses
- Acclimatise, Al Bahathri, Al Sylah, At Talaq, Bruni, Cairn Rouge, Dickens Hill, Ginevra, Horage, Sandford Lad, Tyrnavos
- Updated on 21 October 2023

Tony Murray (18 February 1950 – 6 January 1992) was a Classic-winning jockey, who rode over 1,000 winners in an 18-year career during which he was based in England, Ireland and France.

== Career ==
Anthony Patrick Murray was born in Wantage, Berkshire on 18 February 1950 to jump jockey Paddy Murray. In his school holidays, he used to ride for trainer Captain Tim Forster. After leaving school, he was apprenticed to trainer Frenchie Nicholson, a friend of his father's and his first winner was Guardian Oak at Windsor on 23 May 1966. He rode 14 winners in his first season, rising to 37, 31, 44, 69, 112 and 122 in the following six seasons.

In July 1968, he suffered a near-fatal fall riding Windy Breeze at Windsor. He went over the rails - he believed he was put over them deliberately - and broke his jaw in 48 places "like a shattered teacup". He was in hospital for seven weeks. He returned to riding at Lingfield on 25 September and three days afterwards won the Royal Lodge Stakes at Ascot.

He rode for Doug Smith for a short while, before moving on to ride for Ryan Price. For Price, he won the 1972 Oaks on Ginevra, a filly whose temperament had led fellow jockey Lester Piggott to comment that she would one day kill someone. The following year, he would strike up a partnership with Sandford Lad who became European Champion sprinter after wins in the Nunthorpe Stakes and Prix de l'Abbaye de Longchamp. He himself believed the horse would have been even better over further.

He went unbeaten throughout the 1973 season on Giacometti, a horse that is one of only five to have been placed in three Triple Crown races since the Second World War, although he lost the ride in the last of these to Piggott. In 1975, he won his second and final English classic, the St Leger, on Bruni.

He continued to ride for Price before emigrating to France, where he rode for Charles Millbank at Chantilly, and then to Ireland, where he rode for Vincent O'Brien, among others. Riding for Bruce Hobbs, he won the 1980 Irish Derby from the front, on Tyrnavos, a race that is said to have been his greatest ever ride. He would never win the English version, though he came third on Giacometti, second on Dickens Hill in 1979, and third on Silver Hawk in 1982. On Dickens Hill, he did win the Eclipse, and on Cairn Rouge he won the Champion Stakes and Coronation Stakes of 1980.

While in Ireland, he narrowly missed out on being 1979 Champion Jockey, finishing on 66 winners behind Christy Roche's 68. The nearest he got in Britain was also a second place in 1972, when he was runner-up to Willie Carson.

In 1982, he returned to Newmarket to ride for Michael Albina. In August he steered Horage to victory in the Gimcrack Stakes. Struggling with his weight, he took what proved to be a short-lived retirement, intending to take up training. Instead, in 1984, he became stable jockey to Harry Thomson Jones and narrowly missed out on a 1,000 Guineas double on Al Bahathri in 1985 - being beaten a short head in the Newmarket race before winning the Irish version. Al Bahathri also gave him another Coronation Stakes victory. He also rode another winner of the Gimcrack Stakes that year - Doulab - and took the Cesarewitch Handicap on Kayudee.

He retired again for good in 1986 and became racing manager to owner Tony Budge, whose horses were trained by Richard Hannon.

== Death ==
Murray died on 6 January 1992, aged 41, from a cocktail of drink and pills. Hannon discovered his body at the jockey's home in Wiltshire. His sister Judy listed several factors that may have caused his death, including health fears - he was troubled by ulcers caused by many years of dieting - and the death of his father and a brother. He had also separated from his wife, Jane, who was the daughter of his former trainer Ryan Jarvis.

His funeral took place at Salisbury Crematorium on 16 January 1992. Guests were family members only as his mother did not want racing people present. A memorial service was held at St Paul's Church in Knightsbridge on 20 February of that year.

== Major wins ==
(United Kingdom) Great Britain

- British Champions Sprint Stakes - Al Sylah (1985)
- Fillies' Mile - Acclimatise (1982)
- Nunthorpe Stakes - Sandford Lad (1973)
- Champion Stakes - Cairn Rouge (1980)
- St Leger Stakes - Bruni (1975)
- Falmouth Stakes - Al Bahathri (1985)
- Coronation Stakes - (2) - Cairn Rouge (1980), Al Bahathri (1985)
- Eclipse Stakes - Dickens Hill (1979)
- Oaks Stakes - Ginevra (1972)

(Republic of Ireland) Ireland

- Irish 1,000 Guineas - (2) - Cairn Rouge (1980), Al Bahathri (1985)
- Irish Derby - Tyrnavos (1980)

France

- Prix de l'Abbaye de Longchamp - Sandford Lad (1973)
- Grand Prix de Paris - At Talaq (1984)

== See also ==
- List of jockeys

== Bibliography ==
- Wright, Howard (1986). The Encyclopaedia of Flat Racing. London: Robert Hale. ISBN 0-7090-2639-0.
