= Risk Me =

French-bred Thoroughbred racehorse

- Sire: Sharpo
- Grandsire: Sharpen Up
- Dam: Run The Risk
- Damsire: Run the Gantlet
- Sex: Stallion
- Foaled: 10 March 1984
- Country: France
- Colour: Chestnut
- Breeder: Padovest Inc
- Owner: Lewis Norris
- Trainer: Paul Kelleway
- Record: 16: 5-2-1

Major wins
- National Stakes (1986); Greenham Stakes (1987); Prix Jean Prat (1987); Grand Prix de Paris (1987)

Awards
- Timeform rating 121 (1986), 127 (1987); Top-rated 2-y-o colt in France (1986)

Risk Me (10 March 1984 – after 2002) was a French-bred British-trained Thoroughbred racehorse and sire. As a juvenile in 1986 he won his first two races including the National Stakes and later finished second in both the Middle Park Stakes and the Prix de la Forêt. His performance in the latter race saw him rated the best two-year-old colt to race in France that year. In the following year he won the Greenham Stakes in England but had his biggest success in France where he won the Prix Jean Prat and the Grand Prix de Paris. He failed to win again and was retired from racing at the end of the year. He had modest success as a breeding stallion.

== Background ==
Risk Me was a tall, leggy chestnut horse, with a broad white blaze and a white sock on his left hind leg bred in France by Padovest Inc. In 1985 he was consigned to Deauville Yearling sale and was sold for 220,000 francs (£18,600). During his racing career the colt was owned by Lewis Norris and trained by Paul Kelleway at his Shalfleet stables on the Bury Road in Newmarket. Kelleway was a former National Hunt jockey who had great success as a trainer with cheaply-bought horses including African Song, Swiss Maid and Madam Gay

He was from the first crop of foal sired by Sharpo, a sprinter whose wins included three consecutive runnings of the William Hill Sprint Championship. His other offspring included Lavinia Fontana, College Chapel (winner of the Prix Maurice de Gheest), Penny Drops (Sandown Mile), Sharp Prod (Moët & Chandon Rennen), Gorse (Holsten-Trophy), Port Lucaya (Premio Vittorio di Capua), Sharpical (Tote Gold Trophy) and Dark 'n Sharp (Red Rum Handicap Chase). His dam Run the Risk failed to win on her only start but was a daughter of Siliciana, who won the Cambridgeshire Handicap in 1973, and a female-line descendant of Own Sister, a full-sister to Son-in-Law.

== Racing career ==
=== 1986: two-year-old season ===
Risk Me began his racing career in a five furlong maiden race at Sandown Park in April when he took the lead at half way and won by eight lengths from Acquisitive. A month later he was moved up in class for the Listed National Stakes and came home two and a half lengths clear of Whippet. The colt started odds-on favourite for the Norfolk Stakes at Royal Ascot in June but after travelling well in the first half of the race he began to struggle in the last quarter mile and finished fourth behind Sizzling Melody.

After a three-month break Risk Me was sent to France and started a 15/1 outsider for the Group 1 Prix de la Salamandre over 1400 metres at Longchamp Racecourse on 21 September. Ridden by Cash Asmussen was among the leaders from the start and was the first colt to finish, coming home fourth behind the fillies Miesque, Sakura Reiko and Whakilyric. He was dropped back in distance for the six furlong Middle Park Stakes at Newmarket Racecourse on 4 October and finished second to the front-running Mister Majestic, beaten a neck by the winner. Rather than run the colt in Dewhurst Stakes on 17 October, Kelleway opted to match the two-year-old against older horses in the Prix de la Forêt at Longchamps nine days later. Starting a 21/1 outsider and ridden by Ray Cochrane he tracked the leaders before making rapid progress on the inside rail entering the straight. In a closely contested finish, he was beaten a head by the five-year-old Sarab.

In the official International Classification of two-year-olds for 1986, Risk Me was given a rating of 121, making him the fourth best juvenile colt in Europe behind Reference Point, Ajdal and Shady Heights and the best two-year-old colt to have raced in France. The independent Timeform organisation gave him a rating of 121, eleven pounds inferior to their top two-year-old Reference Point.

=== 1987: three-year-old season ===
Risk Me began his second season in the Greenham Stakes (a trial race for the 2000 Guineas) over seven furlongs at Newbury Racecourse. Ridden by Steve Cauthen and starting at odds of 5/2 he appeared to relish the heavy ground and won by five lengths from Deputy Governor. On much firmer ground at Newmarket on for the 2000 Guineas on 2 May he started 9/2 third choice in the betting but ran poorly and came home thirteenth behind Don't Forget Me. He was matched against older horses in the Lockinge Stakes at Newbury thirteen days later but again failed to handle firm ground and finished unplaced behind the four-year-old Then Again, beaten more than fifteen lengths by the winner. At the end of the month the colt was sent to France for the Prix Jean Prat over 1800 metres at Longchamp in which he faced the undefeated Soviet Star, the winner of the Poule d'Essai des Poulains. Ridden by Tony Cruz, and racing on his favoured soft ground, Risk Me produced a strong late run, took the lead in the final strides and won by half a length from Soviet Star.

On 16 June at Royal Ascot Risk Me was dropped back in distance for the St James's Palace Stakes in which he was partnered by Cauthen and finished third behind Half A Year and Soviet Star with Don't Forget Me in fourth. Twelve days after his defeat at Ascot the colt returned to his native France for the Grand Prix de Paris at Longchamp and started a 9.4/1 in a nine-runner field which included Trempolino, Seattle Dancer and Lockton. The race had been traditionally run over 3100 metres but was cut to 2000 metres for the first time in 1987. Steve Cauthen sent the colt into the lead soon after the start and set a steady pace before accelerating on the final turn. He quickly opened up a clear lead and came home four lengths clear of Seattle Dancer with Trempolino a short head away in third.

After a break of two months Risk Me returned in the Waterford Crystal Mile on firm ground at Goodwood on 29 August but finished tailed-off last of the four runners behind Milligram. In the Irish Champion Stakes over ten furlongs at Phoenix Park Racecourse a week later he came fifth of the twelve runners behind Triptych. He again finished fifth behind Triptych in the Champion Stakes at Newmarket in October. At the end of the month he was sent to the United States to contest the Washington, D.C. International at Laurel Park in which he finished unplaced behind Le Glorieux.

Timeform gave Risk Me a rating of 127 in 1987, making him twelve pounds inferior to their Horse of the Year Reference Point. The International Classification rated him on 123, making him the thirteenth best three-year-old colt in Europe.

== Stud record ==
Risk Me was retired from racing at the end of his second season and began his career as a breeding stallion at a fee of £10,000 at the Elsenham Stud near Bishop's Stortford in Hertfordshire. He later moved to Germany where his last recorded foals were born in 2003. His offspring included Niche, Branston Abby (won 25 races including Chipchase Stakes), Risky (Queen Mary Stakes, Molecomb Stakes) and Tees Components (River Don Novices' Hurdle).

== Pedigree ==
Pedigree of Risk Me (FR), chestnut stallion, 1984
Sire Sharpo (GB) 1977	Sharpen Up (GB); 1969	Atan (USA)	Native Dancer
Sire Sharpo (GB) 1977	Sharpen Up (GB); 1969	Atan (USA)	Mixed Marriage (GB)
Sire Sharpo (GB) 1977	Sharpen Up (GB); 1969	Rocchetta	Rockefella
Sire Sharpo (GB) 1977	Sharpen Up (GB); 1969	Rocchetta	Chambiges (FR)
Sire Sharpo (GB) 1977	Moiety Bird (GB); 1971	Falcon	Milesian (IRE)
Sire Sharpo (GB) 1977	Moiety Bird (GB); 1971	Falcon	Pretty Swift
Sire Sharpo (GB) 1977	Moiety Bird (GB); 1971	Gasca	Gilles de Retz
Sire Sharpo (GB) 1977	Moiety Bird (GB); 1971	Gasca	Sally Deans
Dam Belle Origine (GB) 1976	Run the Gantlet (USA); 1968	Tom Rolfe	Ribot (GB)
Dam Belle Origine (GB) 1976	Run the Gantlet (USA); 1968	Tom Rolfe	Pocahontas
Dam Belle Origine (GB) 1976	Run the Gantlet (USA); 1968	First Feather	First Landing
Dam Belle Origine (GB) 1976	Run the Gantlet (USA); 1968	First Feather	Quill
Dam Belle Origine (GB) 1976	Siliciana (GB); 1969	Silly Season (USA)	Tom Fool
Dam Belle Origine (GB) 1976	Siliciana (GB); 1969	Silly Season (USA)	Double Deal (GB)
Dam Belle Origine (GB) 1976	Siliciana (GB); 1969	Anippe	Aggressor
Dam Belle Origine (GB) 1976	Siliciana (GB); 1969	Anippe	River Clyde (Family: 5-d)
