= Tate Gallery (horse) =

American-bred Thoroughbred racehorse

- Sire: Northern Dancer
- Grandsire: Nearctic
- Dam: Fairy Bridge
- Damsire: Bold Reason
- Sex: Stallion
- Foaled: 25 February 1983
- Died: 1990 (aged 6–7)
- Country: United States
- Colour: Bay
- Breeder: Swettenham Stud
- Owner: Stavros Niarchos
- Trainer: Vincent O'Brien
- Record: 5: 2-0-1

Major wins
- National Stakes (1985)

Tate Gallery (25 February 1983 – 1990) was an American-bred Thoroughbred racehorse and sire. A full-brother to Sadler's Wells he won two of his five races in a track career which lasted from August 1985 until May 1986. As a two-year-old he finished unplaced in the Phoenix Stakes on his debut before winning a maiden race and then recorded his biggest victory in the National Stakes. In the following spring he ran third in the Gladness Stakes and then finished last in the 2000 Guineas before being retired from racing. In a brief stud career he sired several good winners, most notably Lyric Fantasy.

== Background ==
Tate Gallery was a bay horse with a broad white blaze and white socks on his hind legs, bred in Kentucky by Robert Sangster's Swettenham Stud. During his racing career, he carried the colours of the Greek shipping tycoon Stavros Niarchos and was trained at Ballydoyle by Vincent O'Brien. Both Sangster and Niarchos were partners in John Magnier's Coolmore Stud organisation.

Tate Gallery was sired by the Canadian stallion Northern Dancer, who won the Kentucky Derby in 1964 and went on to become one of the most influential sires of the 20th century. His dam, Fairy Bridge, was bought for $40,000 by Sangster in 1976 and was undefeated in a brief racing career consisting of two races as a juvenile in 1977. In the Irish Free Handicap for that year, she was rated the joint-best two-year-old filly alongside Sookera. As a broodmare, she was an outstanding success, with her other foals including Tate Gallery's full-brothers Sadler's Wells and Fairy King. She came from an exceptional family, being a half-sister to Nureyev and a close relative of Thatch.

== Racing career ==
=== 1985: two-year-old season ===
Tate Gallery had a challenging introduction to the track when he was ridden by Pat Eddery in the Group 1 Phoenix Stakes over six furlongs at Phoenix Park Racecourse on 10 August. O'Brien had not intended to run the colt in the race but changed his plans when Tate Gallery's better-fancied stablemate Woodman fell sick. Despite his lack of experience he was made the 5/4 favourite but finished unplaced behind Roaring Riva, with Eddery easing him down when it became apparent that he had no chance of winning. Later that month he recorded his first success in a maiden race over even furlongs at the Curragh, winning "smoothly" from nineteen opponents.

In the National Stakes (run as a Group 1 race for the first time) over seven furlongs at the Curragh on 14 September Tate Gallery was ridden by Cash Asmussen and started the 4/6 favourite. The best of his eight opponents appeared to be the British filly Sweet Adelaide and the Jim Bolger-trained colt Nashamaa both of whom came ito the race unbeaten. After tracking the leaders Tate Gallery went to the front two furlongs out and stayed on well under pressure to win by one and a half lengths from Nashamaa with Sweet Adelaide a further one and a half length back in third.

In the official International Classification for 1985, Tate Gallery was given a rating of 77, six pounds behind the top-rated Bakharoff. The independent Timeform organisation gave him a rating of 117p (with the "p" indicating that he was expected to make more than usual improvement) making him fourteen pounds inferior to their best two-year-old Huntingdale.

=== 1986: three-year-old season ===
Tate Gallery began his second season in the Gladness Stakes over seven furlongs at the Curragh in which he was matched against older horses. He finished third behind the four-year-old Lidhame with Timeform reporting that he "hung left and lacked enthusiasm". Despite his poor effort at the Curragh he was sent to England for the 2000 Guineas at Newmarket Racecourse on 3 May. He was ridden by Tony Ives after O'Brien had first offered the ride to the recently retired Lester Piggott. He made no impact, coming home last of the fourteen finishers behind Dancing Brave and never raced again.

== Stud career ==
Tate Gallery was retired to stud and became a breeding stallion for the Coolmore Stud in County Tipperary at an initial fee of 15,000 guineas. He died in an accident in 1990 at the age of seven.

Considered the best of his offspring was the fast and precocious filly Lyric Fantasy, but he sired a few other winners including Surrealist (Godolphin Stakes), Title Roll (King George Stakes) and Lee Artiste (Sandy Lane Stakes) He was also the damsire of the Prix de l'Abbaye winner Namid.

== Pedigree ==
Pedigree of Tate Gallery (USA), bay stallion, 1983
Sire Northern Dancer (CAN) 1961	Nearctic (CAN); 1954	Nearco	Pharos
Sire Northern Dancer (CAN) 1961	Nearctic (CAN); 1954	Nearco	Nogara
Sire Northern Dancer (CAN) 1961	Nearctic (CAN); 1954	Lady Angela	Hyperion
Sire Northern Dancer (CAN) 1961	Nearctic (CAN); 1954	Lady Angela	Sister Sarah
Sire Northern Dancer (CAN) 1961	Natalma (USA); 1957	Native Dancer	Polynesian
Sire Northern Dancer (CAN) 1961	Natalma (USA); 1957	Native Dancer	Geisha
Sire Northern Dancer (CAN) 1961	Natalma (USA); 1957	Almahmoud	Mahmoud
Sire Northern Dancer (CAN) 1961	Natalma (USA); 1957	Almahmoud	Arbitrator
Dam Fairy Bridge (USA) 1975	Bold Reason (USA); 1968	Hail to Reason	Turn-To
Dam Fairy Bridge (USA) 1975	Bold Reason (USA); 1968	Hail to Reason	Nothirdchance
Dam Fairy Bridge (USA) 1975	Bold Reason (USA); 1968	Lalun	Djeddah
Dam Fairy Bridge (USA) 1975	Bold Reason (USA); 1968	Lalun	Be Faithful
Dam Fairy Bridge (USA) 1975	Special (USA); 1969	Forli	Aristophanes
Dam Fairy Bridge (USA) 1975	Special (USA); 1969	Forli	Trevisa
Dam Fairy Bridge (USA) 1975	Special (USA); 1969	Thong	Nantallah
Dam Fairy Bridge (USA) 1975	Special (USA); 1969	Thong	Rough Shod (Family 5-h)
