= Horage =

Irish-bred Thoroughbred horse (1980–after 2002)

- Sire: Tumble Wind
- Grandsire: Captain Rio
- Dam: Musicienne
- Damsire: Sicambre
- Sex: Stallion
- Foaled: 1980
- Country: Ireland
- Colour: Bay
- Owner: A.R. Rachid
- Trainer: Matt McCormack
- Record: 15:10-1-4
- Earnings: $216,561

Major wins
- Coventry Stakes (1982); July Stakes (1982); Gimcrack Stakes (1982); St. James's Palace Stakes (1983); Timeform rating: 124
- Last updated on 2 October 2025

Horage (1980 – after 2002) was a high-class Irish-bred, British-trained Thoroughbred colt who won four Group races in Britain in 1982 and 1983 over distances from 5 furlongs to one mile. He won nine races as a two-year-old, including the Coventry Stakes and the Gimcrack Stakes. The following year he landed the prestigious St. James's Palace Stakes at Royal Ascot in 1983, his second success at the royal meeting. Horage had modest success as a breeding stallion.

== Background ==
Horage was an Irish-bred bay colt by the good racehorse and sire Tumble Wind out of the mare Muscienne by the French stallion Sicambre. In 1981, he was bought as a yearling for the modest price of 8,000 guineas at Doncaster Bloodstock Sales by Lebanese businessman Mr Abed Rachid. Horage was sent to the small yard of Mattie McCormack near Wantage, Oxfordshire. "Once he'd been broken I knew I had something", recalled McCormack.

== Racing career ==
Running in his owner's green and yellow colours and ridden by Robert Street, Horage first appeared at the modest Hillhouse Stakes over five furlongs at Ayr on 30 March 1982, a race he won by three lengths at 6/1. The colt won his next four races easily, including the Ropergate Stakes at Pontefract in mid-April. In the Garter Stakes at Ascot in late April, he defeated the previous unbeaten and fast colt Brondesbury (subsequently winner of the Norfolk Stakes at Royal Ascot) by five lengths. His rival, who had got loose before the start and run out of control, was well clear around halfway but Horage swept by him at the furlong pole. Horage subsequently won the Salisbury Stakes in May and a six-furlong race at Haydock.

On 15 June 1982 the horse was 85/40 second favourite for the Group Three Coventry Stakes at Royal Ascot. Now ridden by Pat Eddery, he came first by one and a half lengths from the useful Kafu. With Eddery again in the saddle, Horage was joint favourite at 7/4 for the July Stakes at Newmarket. Despite almost losing a shoe, Horage won by three-quarters of a length from On Stage and Kafu, each in receipt of 6 lb. He easily landed the Washington Singer Stakes at Newbury, preparation for the Gimcrack Stakes on 19 August at York. Horage won it by four lengths at odds of 8/13, with Tony Murray on board. After nine wins in a row the colt lost his unblemished record, coming fourth when favourite in the Mill Reef Stakes at Newbury, after which he was found to have sore shins.

As a three-year-old in 1983 Horage was surprisingly defeated in a minor race at Thirsk in April, where his trainer thought the colt hadn't been moving right. Later Horage's off-fore was shown to be like a "bit of dead meat". With McCormack feeling Horage was lazy, it was a struggle to get him ready for Royal Ascot, where he was entered into the Group Two St. James's Palace Stakes over a mile on 14 June. At 18/1, Horage was the outsider in a field of seven. Jockey Steve Cauthen set a fast gallop on Horage, "exactly as he was told", McCormack said; he stole a march of ten lengths on the field just before the turn and won by head from the 2000 Guineas-placed Tolomeo, with Dunbeath well behind in third. Of Horage's pillar-to-post victory BBC racing's Julian Wilson commented: "Courage has always been his strongest suit". Horage ran three more times that year, including the Prix du Moulin, but never reproduced his Ascot form and was retired to stud duties in Ireland. Timeform awarded him a rating of 124.

== Breeding career ==
Horage enjoyed modest success as a sire, his most successful offspring being the colt Star Rage who won many longer-distance handicaps and became a decent hurdler over two miles, earning victories in the Fighting Fifth Hurdle and the County Hurdle. Another son of Horage's, Capolago, won a Group 3 race in Italy. Among Horage's daughters were: Song of the Glens, whose son Bad As I Wanna Be won the Prix Morny and was placed in the Middle Park Stakes; Helensville, a Classic winner in Norway; and Jackie, the dam of several winners.
