= Sayyedati =

British-bred Thoroughbred racehorse

- Racing silks of Mohamed Obaida
- Sire: Shadeed
- Grandsire: Nijinsky
- Dam: Dubian
- Damsire: High Line
- Sex: Mare
- Foaled: 26 January 1990
- Country: United Kingdom
- Colour: Bay
- Breeder: Gainsborough Stud
- Owner: Mohamed Obaida
- Trainer: Clive Brittain
- Record: 22: 6-5-3
- Earnings: £885,669

Major wins
- Cherry Hinton Stakes (1992); Moyglare Stud Stakes (1992); Cheveley Park Stakes (1992); 1000 Guineas (1993); Prix Jacques Le Marois (1993); Sussex Stakes (1995)

Sayyedati (26 January 1990 – August 2007) was a British Thoroughbred racehorse and broodmare. In a racing career which lasted from June 1993 to October 1995 she ran twenty-two times winning six races and being placed eight times. Sayyedati was one of the leading two-year-old fillies in Europe in 1992, recording Group One successes in the Moyglare Stud Stakes at the Curragh and the Cheveley Park Stakes at Newmarket Racecourse. After being beaten on her three-year-old debut, Sayyedati won the Classic 1000 Guineas. She went on to become a successful international performer over a mile, winning the Prix Jacques Le Marois at Deauville in 1993 and the Sussex Stakes at Goodwood as a five-year-old. She was also placed in several major races including the Breeders' Cup Mile. Sayyedati was retired from racing to become a broodmare at the end of her five-year-old season.

== Background ==
Sayyedati was a bay filly bred in England by Maktoum Al Maktoum's Gainsborough Stud. She was owned by Maktoum's friend Mohamed Obaida, a Dubai-based property developer. Sayyedati was one of the best horses sired by Shadeed who won the 2000 Guineas and the Queen Elizabeth II Stakes in 1985. Her dam, Dubian finished third to Oh So Sharp and Triptych in the 1985 Epsom Oaks and was a half-sister of the triple Champion Hurdler See You Then. Apart from Sayyedati, Dubian produced several other winners including Golden Snake, whose victories included Group One races in France, Italy and Germany. The filly was trained throughout her career by Clive Brittain at his Carlburg stables at Newmarket, Suffolk.

== Racing career ==
=== 1992: two-year-old season ===
Sayyedati began her career by finishing second in a six furlong maiden race at Ascot in June. She finished two lengths behind the odds-on favourite and eight lengths clear of the third-placed finisher. A month later, Sayyedati was moved up in class for the Group Three Cherry Hinton Stakes over six furlongs at Newmarket. She started 6/4 favourite and won from Toocando, Mystic Goddess and Niche. Sayyedati was then sent to Ireland to contest the Group One Moyglare Stud Stakes at the Curragh in September. Racing over seven furlongs on soft ground she won by one and a half lengths from Bright Generation. The Cheveley Park Stakes at Newmarket three and a half weeks later saw Sayyedati ridden for the first time by Walter Swinburn, who became her regular jockey. The race pitted Sayyedati against Lyric Fantasy, a sprinter who had defeated older horses in the Nunthorpe Stakes, and Poker Chip, the winner of the Flying Childers Stakes. Sayyedati led from the start and ran on strongly in the closing stages to beat Lyric Fantasy by two lengths. Despite Sayyedati's win at Newmarket, she was beaten by Lyric Fantasy for the title of European champion two-year-old filly at the Cartier Racing Awards, but was the clear winter favourite for the following year's 1000 Guineas.

=== 1993: three-year-old season ===
Sayyedati began her three-year-old season on 13 April at Newmarket in the Nell Gwyn Stakes, a trial for the 1000 Guineas. She started the 11/8 favourite but was unable to catch the front-running Niche, and finished third, beaten one and a half lengths. After the race Brittain expressed his confidence in the filly's capacity to improve, and Swinburn elected to keep the ride on Sayyedati in the upcoming Classic, despite having the opportunity to switch to another fancied runner. Sayyedati and Niche met for the third time in the 1000 Guineas over the Rowley Mile course sixteen later. Brittain took extra precautions in the run-up to the race: Sayyedati's temperature was taken regularly, her manger was scrubbed between meals and her groom spent the night before the big race sleeping in her stable. In a field of twelve fillies, Sayyedati started second favourite on 4/1 with the French-trained Elizabeth Bay being made favourite. The filly appeared nervous before the race but Brittain was reportedly unconcerned, commenting that "only wooden horses don't sweat". Sayyedati started slowly but made progress in the second half of the race to overtake Niche a furlong from the finish. The filly was driven out by Swinburn to beat the Nell Gwyn winner by half a length with the outsider Ajfan in third, Lyric Fantasy sixth and Elizabeth Bay eighth.

After a break of three months, Sayyedati returned to race against colts and older horses in the Sussex Stakes at Goodwood. Starting at odds of 11/1, Sayyedati finished strongly to finish second to the French colt Bigstone, ahead of a field which included Culture Vulture, Inchinor and Zafonic. In August, Sayyedati traveled to France for the Prix Jacques Le Marois and recorded her fourth Group One success, beating Ski Paradise and Kingmambo in a closely contested finish. On her final European start of the year she finished fourth behind the colts Bigstone, Barathea and Kingmambo in the Queen Elizabeth II Stakes at Ascot Racecourse. She was then sent to California for the Breeders' Cup at Santa Anita Park in November. Rather than contesting the mile, she was brought down in distance for the Breeders' Cup Sprint over six furlongs on dirt, reportedly at the insistence of Maktoum Al Maktoum. She was never in contention and finished unplaced behind Cardmania.

=== 1994: four-year-old season ===
Sayyedati remained in training as a four-year-old, but failed to win in six races during a season in which Brittain's entire stable of horses appeared to run below expectations. In spring she was sent to Japan where she finished third to Ski Paradise in the Group Two Keio Hai Spring Cup and seventh behind North Flight in the Yasuda Kinen. On her return to Europe she finished fourth to Distant View in the Sussex Stakes (looking unlucky not to finish closer) and then produced her best performance of the year in the Prix Jacques Le Marois, finishing second to East of the Moon, with Ski Paradise and Barathea fifth and sixth. Her last two starts were disappointing as she finished unplaced in the Prix du Moulin at Longchamp and the Queen Elizabeth II Stakes.

=== 1995: five-year-old season ===
Despite her lack of success in 1994, Sayyedati returned to the racecourse as a five-year-old mare. On her first appearance she moved down to Group Three level for the first time since April 1993 when she finished second by a head to the sprinter Cherokee Rose in the 1400m Prix du Palais-Royal at Longchamp in May. A month later, she appeared at Royal Ascot for the first time and finished fifth in the Queen Anne Stakes. In July, Sayyedati ran in the Sussex Stakes for the third time. Ridden by the Australian jockey Brett Doyle the mare was towards the rear in the early stages before taking the lead approaching the final furlong. She was pushed out by Doyle in the closing stages to win by half a length from the favourite Bahri. In August, Sayyedati contested her third Prix Jacques Le Marois. Doyle found himself in the lead on Sayyedati 300m from the finish, but the British mare hung to the left in the closing stages and was beaten a length by the outsider Miss Satamixa. Doyle admitted that he had gone to the front earlier than he had planned. A month later she returned to France for the Prix du Moulin in which she finished strongly to take fourth place, less than two lengths behind the winner Ridgewood Pearl. Sayyedati's second Breeders' Cup was more successful than her first, as she finished third to Ridgewood Pearl in the Breeders' Cup Mile at Belmont Park.

== Assessment ==
In their book, A Century of Champions, based on the Timeform rating system, John Randall and Tony Morris rated Sayyedati an "average" winner of the 1000 Guineas.

Clive Brittain called her "a great horse and a pleasure to train. She had speed, class and a great heart."

== Stud record ==
Sayyedati was retired to become a broodmare for the Gainsborough Stud. She produced several winners, the best of them being the unbeaten colt Almushahar (sired by Silver Hawk), who won the Champagne Stakes on his second and final racecourse appearance. Sayyedati died in August 2007 at the age of 17.

- 1997 Lemarate (USA) : Bay colt, foaled 21 February, by Gulch (USA) – placed 6 times from 40 starts in Britain 2000–2004
- 1998 Djebel Amour (USA) : filly, foaled 1 January, by Mt Livermore (USA) -
- 1999 Cunas (USA) : Bay filly, foaled 20 March, by Irish River (FR) – won 1 race from 2 starts in England 2002
- 2000 Almushahar (USA) : Bay colt (fourth foal), foaled 7 April, by Silver Hawk (USA) – won 2 races including G2 Champagne Stakes, Doncaster from 2 starts in England 2002
- 2001 Hyper Delight (USA) : colt by Silver Hawk (USA)
- 2003 Lonely Ahead (USA) : Bay filly, foaled 10 February, by Rahy (USA) – won 1 race and 4th G2 Lowther Stakes, York from 5 starts in England 2005
- 2005 Sayyedati Symphony (USA) : Bay filly, foaled 15 May, by Gone West (USA) – placed 3 times including 4th LR Pretty Polly Stakes, Newmarket from 7 starts in England 2007-8
- 2007 Sayyedati Storm (USA) : Bay filly, foaled 22 February, by Storm Cat (USA) – unplaced in 3 starts in England 2010

== Pedigree ==
Pedigree of Sayyedati (GB), bay mare, 1990
Sire Shadeed (USA) 1982	Nijinsky; 1967	Northern Dancer	Nearctic
Sire Shadeed (USA) 1982	Nijinsky; 1967	Northern Dancer	Natalma
Sire Shadeed (USA) 1982	Nijinsky; 1967	Flaming Page	Bull Page
Sire Shadeed (USA) 1982	Nijinsky; 1967	Flaming Page	Flaring Top
Sire Shadeed (USA) 1982	Continual; 1976	Damascus	Sword Dancer
Sire Shadeed (USA) 1982	Continual; 1976	Damascus	Kerala
Sire Shadeed (USA) 1982	Continual; 1976	Continuation	Forli
Sire Shadeed (USA) 1982	Continual; 1976	Continuation	Comtinue
Dam Dubian (GB) 1982	High Line; 1966	High Hat	Hyperion
Dam Dubian (GB) 1982	High Line; 1966	High Hat	Madonna
Dam Dubian (GB) 1982	High Line; 1966	Time Call	Chanteur
Dam Dubian (GB) 1982	High Line; 1966	Time Call	Aleria
Dam Dubian (GB) 1982	Melodina; 1968	Tudor Melody	Tudor Minstrel
Dam Dubian (GB) 1982	Melodina; 1968	Tudor Melody	Matelda
Dam Dubian (GB) 1982	Melodina; 1968	Rose of Medina	Never Say Die
Dam Dubian (GB) 1982	Melodina; 1968	Rose of Medina	Minaret (Family: 9-c)
