= Tobougg =

Thoroughbred racehorse

- Racing colours of Godolphin
- Sire: Barathea
- Grandsire: Sadler's Wells
- Dam: Lacovia
- Damsire: Majestic Light
- Sex: Stallion
- Foaled: 28 February 1998
- Country: Ireland
- Colour: bay
- Breeder: Citadel Stud
- Owner: Ahmed Al Maktoum; Godolphin Racing
- Trainer: Mick Channon; Saeed bin Suroor
- Record: 12: 3-2-2
- Earnings: £742,780

Major wins
- Prix de la Salamandre (2000); Dewhurst Stakes (2000)

Awards
- European Champion Two-Year-Old Colt (2000)

Tobougg (1998–2018) was a thoroughbred racehorse and sire, who was bred in Ireland, but trained in England and Dubai during a racing career which lasted from 2000 to 2002. He was named European Champion Two-Year-Old Colt for 2000 at the Cartier Racing Awards. He was unbeaten in three starts in his championship season including two Group One races, the Prix de la Salamandre in France and the Dewhurst Stakes in England. He never won another race although he was placed in The Derby, the Champion Stakes and the Hong Kong Cup. He had some success as a breeding stallion and broodmare sire although he sired few major race winners.

== Background ==
Tobougg was bred in County Limerick, Ireland by the Citadel Stud. He was sired by the Sadler's Wells stallion Barathea (horse) out of the mare Lacovia. Barathea was a specialist miler who was named European Horse of the Year in 1994, a year in which he won the Breeders' Cup Mile. He became a successful stallion, siring the winners of over seven hundred races, although only seven of these were at Group One level. Lacovia was a highly successful racehorse who won the Prix Saint-Alary and the Prix de Diane in 1986.

Tobougg was sent as a yearling to the Tattersalls sales in September 1999 where he was bought for 230,000gns by John Ferguson Bloodstock on behalf of Ahmed Al Maktoum. Tobougg was sent into training with Mick Channon who handled him for his first season. He was then transferred to the Godolphin Racing team and trained for the rest of his career by Saeed bin Suroor.

Tobougg was reportedly named after a region in Saudi Arabia.

== Racing career ==
=== 2000: two-year-old season ===
Tobougg made his debut in a maiden race at York in late August. He lost ground at the start and had trouble finding a clear run, but once switched to the outside he ran on strongly to win by a length and three quarters. Despite the unimportant status of the race his performance attracted attention, with press reports calling him "a future star" and bookmakers offering him at 25/1 for the following year's 2000 Guineas. Channon called him "a lovely horse" while his jockey Craig Williams emphasised the ease of his win by claiming that "he hardly knew he had a race".

Tobougg was then immediately moved up to Group One level for the Prix de la Salamandre at Longchamp, for which the leading fancies were the Prix Morny winner Bad As I Wanna Be and the Railway Stakes winner Honours List. Settled in third by Craig Williams, Tobougg was moved up to take the lead a furlong out and pulled clear to win by two lengths despite being eased down in the closing stages. Mick Channon, who watched the race on television from home after forgetting his passport called Tobougg a colt of the "highest quality" while adding that he had a "quirky temperament". After the race Tobougg's price for the Guineas contracted to 10/1, and speculation began that he would be removed from Channon's stable to join Godolphin.

On his final start of the season, Tobougg was sent to Newmarket for Britain's most prestigious two-year-old race, the Dewhurst Stakes. Sent off the 7/4 favourite Tobougg raced prominently before moving into the lead two furlongs out and winning "comfortably" by one and a quarter lengths from Noverre. The Independent called it a "smooth performance" while pointing out that the field may have been below the usual standard. The bookmakers responded by cutting him to 8/1 for the Guineas.

Before the end of the season, Tobougg's ownership, as had been predicted, was transferred to the Maktoum family's Godolphin Racing operation and he was moved to the stable of Saeed bin Suroor, spending the winters in Dubai before being moved back to Britain during the Summer.

=== 2001: three-year-old season ===
On returning from Dubai, Tobougg was sent straight to the 2000 Guineas without running in a trial race. He was the chosen ride of Godolphin's stable jockey Frankie Dettori despite the fact that he had been beaten by his stable companion Rumpold in a private trial race in Dubai. Dettori rode the colt in all but one of his subsequent races. He was made 4/1 favourite in a field of eighteen, but after racing prominently he made little impact in the closing stages and lost his unbeaten record, finishing eighth behind Golan. The Godolphin team were unable to explain his "dismal" performance.

A month later, Tobougg was moved up to a mile and a half for The Derby and ran creditably, finishing strongly to take third place behind Galileo and Golan. At Sandown in July he finished fourth as 9/4 favourite for the Eclipse Stakes, beaten less than a length behind Medicean. Dettori reported that the colt "hated" the firm ground.

Tobougg was then off the course for three months before returning in the Champion Stakes at Newmarket. Ridden by Kevin Darley he tracked the leaders before moving into the lead a quarter of a mile from the finish. he ran on well but was headed inside the final furlong and beaten three quarters of a length by Nayef. On his final start of the year he traveled to Hong Kong where he faced an international field in the Hong Kong Cup. Dettori sent the colt into the lead from the start, and after being headed a furlong out, Tobougg rallied strongly but was beaten a head by the Japanese runner Agnes Digital. Saeed bin Suroor was pleased with the colt's effort and said that he would be "a serious horse next season."

=== 2002: four-year-old season ===
Tobougg failed to live up to his trainer's prediction in four starts in 2002. He finished last of the fifteen runners behind Nayef in the Dubai Sheema Classic, and on his return to Europe, ran fifth behind Rebellline in the Tattersalls Gold Cup.

Having run in nine consecutive Group One races, Tobougg was dropped in class for the Listed Steventon Stakes at Newbury in July. He started Evens favourite, but could finish only third to Highdown. For his final race he was sent to Belmont Park where he finished last of the eight runners in the Man o' War Stakes.

== Assessment ==
Tobougg was named European Champion Two-Year-Old Colt at the Cartier Racing Awards in 2000. In the official International Classification for 2000, released in January 2001, Tobougg was ranked equal third on 120, behind the colts Minardi (Phoenix Stakes) and Okawango (Prix Jean-Luc Lagardère) and equal with the filly Superstar Leo.

In 2001, Tobougg was rated the eleventh best three-year-old colt in Europe, with a rating of 119.

== Stud career ==
Tobougg began his stud career at the Darley Stud, being shuttled between its bases in England and Australia. Prior to his new home he stood alongside the champion stayer Double Trigger at the Clarendon Farm stud in Wiltshire, England at a fee of £2,500. He sired the winners of more than two hundred races, but few at a high level, His only Group One winner was the Australian-bred The Pooka who won the New Zealand 2000 Guineas in 2007. He stood at Anngrove Stud Farm, Mountmellick, County Laois from 2012 until his death from suspected laminitis in December 2018.

== Pedigree ==
Pedigree of Tobougg (IRE), bay stallion, 1998
Sire Barathea (IRE) 1990	Sadler's Wells; 1981	Northern Dancer	Nearctic
Sire Barathea (IRE) 1990	Sadler's Wells; 1981	Northern Dancer	Natalma
Sire Barathea (IRE) 1990	Sadler's Wells; 1981	Fairy Bridge	Bold Reason
Sire Barathea (IRE) 1990	Sadler's Wells; 1981	Fairy Bridge	Special
Sire Barathea (IRE) 1990	Brocade; 1981	Habitat	Sir Gaylord
Sire Barathea (IRE) 1990	Brocade; 1981	Habitat	Little Hut
Sire Barathea (IRE) 1990	Brocade; 1981	Canton Silk	Runnymede
Sire Barathea (IRE) 1990	Brocade; 1981	Canton Silk	Clouded Lamp
Dam Lacovia (USA) 1983	Majestic Light; 1973	Majestic Prince	Raise a Native
Dam Lacovia (USA) 1983	Majestic Light; 1973	Majestic Prince	Gay Hostess
Dam Lacovia (USA) 1983	Majestic Light; 1973	Irradiate	Ribot
Dam Lacovia (USA) 1983	Majestic Light; 1973	Irradiate	High Voltage
Dam Lacovia (USA) 1983	Hope For All; 1975	Secretariat	Bold Ruler
Dam Lacovia (USA) 1983	Hope For All; 1975	Secretariat	Somethingroyal
Dam Lacovia (USA) 1983	Hope For All; 1975	Hopespringseternal	Buckpasser
Dam Lacovia (USA) 1983	Hope For All; 1975	Hopespringseternal	Rose Bower (Family: 16-g)
