= Frank Wootton (jockey) =

Australian jockey

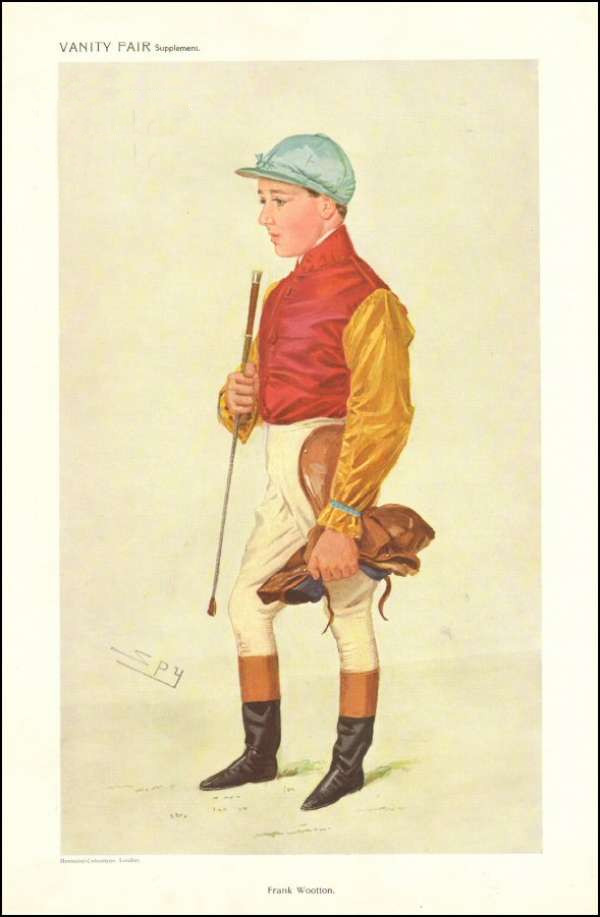
- Caricature by Spy from Vanity Fair in 1909.

Personal information
- Born: 14 December 1893 Glebe, Sydney, Australia
- Died: 6 April 1940 (aged 46) Sydney, Australia
- Occupation: Jockey

Horse racing career
- Sport: Horse racing
- Career wins: Record incomplete

Major racing wins
- British Classic Race wins as jockey: Epsom Oaks (1909); St Leger Stakes (1910)

Racing awards
- British flat racing Champion Jockey 4 times (1909, 1910, 1911 1912)

Significant horses
- Swynford

Francis Leonard Wootton (14 December 1893 – 6 April 1940), known as "Frank" or "Frankie", and sometimes referred to as "The Wonderboy", was an Australian horse racing jockey who had great success as a teenager in the Edwardian era when he was British champion for four successive years.

== Early life ==
He was born in Australia, the eldest son of Richard Wootton, a "tall, dark-visaged, hard-bitten Australian". His brother was Stanley, another jockey, and later, trainer and jockey coach. The boys were subjected to a very strict regime during their youth; their father was determined they would become jockeys and allegedly denied them food.

Richard was sure Frank was ready to race ride from the age of 9, but Australian Jockey Club rules prohibited it. Thus, the Wootton family, together with another young prospective jockey, Bill "Midge" McLachlan, relocated to South Africa where age restrictions did not apply.

== Riding career ==
Frank was successful in South Africa immediately. His first victory was at Turffontein, still only aged nine, in October 1903. In fact, the two Wootton brothers, along with McLachlan, were, for a short time, to dominate South African racing. Briefly in 1906, the Woottons moved back to Australia, but Frank was still too young for a jockey's licence, so the family relocated again to Epsom, Surrey in 1906, where Richard had plans to set up a jockey academy.

After the move to England, Wootton was quick to pick up where he had left off in South Africa, getting his first win aged just 13. In 1908, he rode seven winners at the St. Leger meeting. By the age of 16 he was the youngest-ever champion jockey, having also won his first classic, the Oaks, on Perola. The next year he retained his title, having teamed up with what he considered the best horse he ever rode – the St. Leger and Eclipse winner Swynford. Now in his teens, he was showing what was called "miraculous dash and skill". He mainly rode in the cerise, gold and blue silks of his father, or the pale blue and maize hoops of owner Edward Hulton.

Wootton retained the title in each of the next two years. By then though, he had grown and was beginning to struggle with his weight. He also had a motorbike accident on Epsom Downs, slightly fracturing his collarbone. Rumours of imminent retirement began to start circulating in 1912, accompanied by denials from Wootton himself. When he could meet the weight, though, he was still winning races. He rode 10 winners at Glorious Goodwood in 1911, seven winners at Royal Ascot in 1912 and in one particular week in August 1913, he rode eight consecutive winners.

By the end of 1913, however, the strain of keeping his weight down had become too much and Wootton all but retired. He took to training a few lower-grade horses but his burgeoning training career was curtailed by the advent of World War I during which he served with the British Expeditionary Force in Mesopotamia, where he managed to race as well.

Returning from the war, Wootton turned to National Hunt racing, where the requirement to meet low weights is less. It has been said that he did not make a success of this but earlier sources deemed him a brilliant rider over hurdles, who "took his place among the champions almost immediately", albeit with an initial unfair advantage of a 5 lb allowance as a new jumps jockey.

In 1999, the Racing Post ranked Wooton as ninth in their list of the Top 50 jockeys of the 20th century.

== Death ==
Ultimately, he became a trainer, sending out over 100 winners from his father's former yard. He returned to Australia in 1933, but he continued to be ill, attributed to his race falls and to the wasting regime of his riding years. He began to drink and on 6 April 1940, was convicted of drunkenness. Later that day, whilst in jail, he had an epileptic seizure and died. He was buried in a Catholic ceremony in Botany Cemetery.

== Major wins ==
(United Kingdom) Great Britain

=== Classics ===
- Oaks – Perola (1909)
- St. Leger – Swynford (1910)

=== Selected other races ===
- Eclipse – Swynford (1911)
- Cesarewitch – Verney (1910)

== Career statistics ==
=== Total winners by season ===
South Africa

- 1903: 1+
- 1904: Not known
- 1905: Not known
- 1906: 16

(United Kingdom) Great Britain

- 1907: 39
- 1908: 129
- 1909: 165
- 1910: 137
- 1911: 187
- 1912: 118
- 1913 onwards: Not known

== Bibliography ==
- Ryan, J. A. (2005). "Wootton, Francis Leonard (Frank) (1893–1940)". Australian Dictionary of Biography, q.v 'Wootton, Francis Leonard (Frank) (1893–1940)'. National Centre of Biography, Australian National University.
