= Hackwood Stakes =

Flat horse race in Britain

- Class: Group 3
- Location: Newbury Racecourse; Newbury, England
- Race type: Flat / Thoroughbred
- Sponsor: Hallgarten and Novum Wines
- Website: Newbury

Race information
- Distance: 6f (1,207 metres)
- Surface: Turf
- Track: Straight
- Qualification: Three-years-old and up
- Weight: 9 st 4 lb (3yo); 9 st 9 lb (4yo+); Allowances; 3 lb for fillies and mares Penalties; 7 lb for Group 1 winners * 5 lb for Group 2 winners * 3 lb for Group 3 winners * * after 2024
- Purse: £85,000 (2025); 1st: £48,204

Hackwood Stakes
2026
Symbol Of Honour	Mitbaahy	Soldier's Tree

Previous years
2025
Rage Of Bamby	King's Gamble	Regional
2024
Elite Status	Lake Forest	Kind Of Blue
2023
Commanche Falls	Diligent Harry	Cold Case
2022
Minzaal	Go Bears Go	Dubawi Legend
2021
Happy Romance	Diligent Harry	Tabdeed

2020-2011
2020
Tabdeed	The Tin Man	Shine So Bright
2019
Waldpfad	Khaadem	Keystroke
2018
Yafta	Projection	Dream Of Dreams
2017
Magical Memory	Perfect Angel	Lady Macapa
2016
The Tin Man	Divine	Raucous
2015
Strath Burn	Portamento	Divine
2014
Music Master	Heeraat	Es Que Love
2013
Heeraat	Hamza	Krypton Factor
2012
Soul	Firebeam	Maarek
2011
Deacon Blues	Markab	Jimmy Styles

2010-2001
2010
Regal Parade	High Standing	Secret Asset
2009
High Standing	Prime Defender	Doncaster Rover
2008
Intrepid Jack	Corrybrough	Balthazaar's Gift
2007
Balthazaar's Gift	Al Qasi	Sonny Red
2006
Fayr Jag	Kodiac	Tawaassol
2005
Beckermet	Ashdown Express	Baron's Pit
2004
Pastoral Pursuits	Cartography	Dowager
2003
Somnus	Ashdown Express	The Tatling
2002
Ashdown Express	Mugharreb	Massarra
2001
Invincible Spirit	Mugharreb	Bouncing Bowdler

2000-1991
2000
Auenklang	Harmonic Way	Cretan Gift
1999
Arkadian Hero	Night Star	Grazia
1998
Grazia	Bold Edge	Desert Lady
1997
Hattab	Soviet State	Hello Mister
1996
Jayannpee	Easy Dollar	Venture Capitalist
1995
Hard To Figure	Inzar	Nuriva
1994
Lake Coniston	Nimphidia	Storm Canyon
1993
Catrail	Midhish	Montendre
1992
Montendre	Notley	Bit Of A Lark
1991
Keen Hunter	Sizzling Saga	Montendre

1990-1988
1990
La Grange Music	Duck And Dive	Rivers Rhapsody
1989
Green's Canaletto	Paddy Chalk	Thorn Dance
1988
Point Of Light	Wing Park	Dawn's Delight

The Hackwood Stakes is a Group 3 flat horse race in Great Britain open to thoroughbreds aged three years or older. It is run at Newbury over a distance of 6 furlongs (1,207 metres), and it is scheduled to take place each year in July.

The event was promoted to Group 3 status in 2006, having been classed previously at Listed level. It was sponsored by Shadwell Racing from 2009 to 2011. In 2012, it was sponsored by Chrisbeekracing.com and run as the Chrisbeekracing.com Stakes.

The Hackwood Stakes is currently held on the second day of Newbury's Summer Festival meeting, the same day as the Weatherbys Super Sprint.

== Records ==
Most successful horse since 1969:

- no horse has won this race more than once since 1969

Leading jockey since 1969 (5 wins):

- Pat Eddery – Bold Tack (1975), Interval (1987), Lake Coniston (1994), Hattab (1997), Invincible Spirit (2001)

Leading trainer since 1969 (3 wins):

- Sir Henry Cecil – Carelko (1979), Gaius (1984), Gwydion (1986)
- James Fanshawe – La Grange Music (1990), Deacon Blues (2011), The Tin Man (2016)

== Winners since 1969 ==
Year	Winner	Age	Jockey	Trainer	Time
1969	Jacobus	4	Eddie Hide	Sir Gordon Richards	1:15.40
1970	Jukebox	4	Geoff Lewis	Harold Wallington	1:14.90
1971	Green God	3	Lester Piggott	Michael Jarvis	1:11.50
1972	Caerdeon	4	Geoff Lewis	Noel Murless	1:15.90
1973	Fille De Joie	3	Joe Mercer	Dick Hern	1:16.26
1974	Sarasota Star	3	Lester Piggott	Dermot Weld	1:14.68
1975	Bold Tack	4	Pat Eddery	Willie Robinson	1:15.31
1976	Solar	3	Geoff Baxter	Bill Wightman	1:16.06
1977	Metair	3	Taffy Thomas	Bill Wightman	1:12.86
1978	Middleton Sam	3	Brian Rouse	Richard Hannon Sr.	1:13.57
1979	Carelko	3	Joe Mercer	Henry Cecil	1:14.58
1980	Great Eastern	3	Willie Carson	John Dunlop	1:15.70
1981	Integrity	3	Geoff Baxter	Bruce Hobbs	1:14.66
1982	Lucky Hunter	3	Willie Carson	Clive Brittain	1:14.15
1983	Coquito's Friend	3	Bruce Raymond	Ben Hanbury	1:13.73
1984	Gaius	3	Nigel Day	Henry Cecil	1:12.76
1985	Breadcrumb	3	Tyrone Williams	Henry Candy	1:16.39
1986	Gwydion	3	Steve Cauthen	Henry Cecil	1:12.95
1987	Interval	3	Pat Eddery	Jeremy Tree	1:12.73
1988	Point of Light	3	Paul Eddery	Geoff Lewis	1:15.20
1989	Green's Canaletto	3	Ray Cochrane	William Jarvis	1:11.65
1990	La Grange Music	3	Ray Cochrane	James Fanshawe	1:12.26
1991	Keen Hunter	4	Steve Cauthen	John Gosden	1:14.77
1992	Montendre	5	John Reid	Matt McCormack	1:17.20
1993	Catrail	3	Michael Roberts	John Gosden	1:13.94
1994	Lake Coniston	3	Pat Eddery	Geoff Lewis	1:13.14
1995	Hard to Figure	9	Steve Drowne	Ron Hodges	1:14.53
1996	Jayannpee	5	Willie Ryan	Ian Balding	1:10.71
1997	Hattab	3	Pat Eddery	Peter Walwyn	1:11.07
1998	Grazia	3	Seb Sanders	Sir Mark Prescott	1:12.95
1999	Arkadian Hero	4	Gérald Mossé	Luca Cumani	1:10.78
2000	Auenklang	3	John Reid	Saeed bin Suroor	1:09.81
2001	Invincible Spirit	4	Pat Eddery	John Dunlop	1:12.34
2002	Ashdown Express	3	Jimmy Fortune	Chris Wall	1:12.10
2003	Somnus	3	Kevin Darley	Tim Easterby	1:11.04
2004	Pastoral Pursuits	3	Steve Drowne	Hughie Morrison	1:12.91
2005	Beckermet	3	Martin Dwyer	Roger Fisher	1:10.65
2006	Fayr Jag	7	David Allan	Tim Easterby	1:12.41
2007 (Note: The 2007 running took place at Ascot)	Balthazaar's Gift	4	Joe Fanning	Luca Cumani	1:14.31
2008	Intrepid Jack	6	George Baker	Hughie Morrison	1:12.83
2009	High Standing	4	Ryan Moore	William Haggas	1:13.62
2010	Regal Parade	6	Adrian Nicholls	David Nicholls	1:14.33
2011	Deacon Blues	4	Frankie Dettori	James Fanshawe	1:13.51
2012	Soul	5	Silvestre de Sousa	Saeed bin Suroor	1:17.22
2013	Heeraat	4	Paul Hanagan	William Haggas	1:10.48
2014	Music Master	4	Fergus Sweeney	Henry Candy	1:11.38
2015	Strath Burn	3	Jim Crowley	Charles Hills	1:12.21
2016	The Tin Man	4	Tom Queally	James Fanshawe	1:11.61
2017	Magical Memory	5	Frankie Dettori	Charles Hills	1:15.86
2018	Yafta	3	Jim Crowley	Richard Hannon Jr.	1:11.19
2019	Waldpfad	5	Andrea Atzeni	Dominik Moser	1:15.83
2020	Tabdeed	5	Jim Crowley	Owen Burrows	1:11.09
2021	Happy Romance	3	Sean Levey	Richard Hannon Jr.	1:10.29
2022	Minzaal	4	Jim Crowley	Owen Burrows	1:10.37
2023	Commanche Falls	6	Connor Beasley	Michael Dods	1:12.57
2024	Elite Status	3	Clifford Lee	Karl Burke	1:09.49
2025	Rage Of Bamby	5	Charles Bishop	Eve Johnson Houghton	1:11.61
2026	Symbol Of Honour	4	William Buick	Charlie Appleby	1:09.46

== See also ==
- Horse racing in Great Britain
- List of British flat horse races
