= Richard Wootton (horse trainer) =

Australian racehorse trainer

Richard (Dick) Rawson Wootton (1867–1946) was an Australian racehorse trainer. Wootton was born in Taree, New South Wales, and trained horses in Australia, the UK, and South Africa. He was the British flat racing Champion Trainer in 1913. His son Frank Wootton was a champion jockey.
