= Sharpo =

British-bred Thoroughbred racehorse (1977–1994)

- Sire: Sharpen Up
- Grandsire: Atan
- Dam: Moiety Bird
- Damsire: Falcon
- Sex: Colt
- Foaled: 1977
- Country: Great Britain
- Colour: Chestnut
- Breeder: K. V. Stenborg & R. E. Shingles
- Owner: Monica Sheriffe
- Trainer: Jeremy Tree
- Record: 18: 7-4-3
- Earnings: $247,353

Major wins
- Temple Stakes (1980); William Hill Sprint Championship (1980, 1981, 1982); Prix de Saint-Georges (1981); July Cup (1982); Prix de l'Abbaye de Longchamp (1982); Timeform rating: 132
- Last updated on 16 June 2025

Sharpo (1977–1994) was a champion British Thoroughbred sprinter. He won seven races and more than £230,000 in prize money. Sharpo developed a particular liking for York Racecourse, winning the Nunthorpe Stakes (known then as the William Hill Sprint Championship) three times in a row from 1980, becoming the first horse to do so since the 1920s. He also won the July Cup and the Prix de l'Abbaye, as well as twice being second in the latter race.

Sharpo went on to become a very successful sire before his death in June 1994, his progeny winning 216 races on the flat worth $1.7 million. His best offspring were College Chapel, Risk Me, Cutting Blade and Lavinia Fontana.
