= Weatherbys Super Sprint =

Flat horse race in Britain

- Class: Sales
- Location: Newbury Racecourse; Newbury, England
- Inaugurated: 1991
- Race type: Flat / Thoroughbred
- Sponsor: Weatherbys
- Website: Newbury

Race information
- Distance: 5f 34y (1,037 metres)
- Surface: Turf
- Track: Straight
- Qualification: Two-year-olds sold publicly at specified sales for maximum values of: £62,000 before July 1 last year; £65,000 after June 30 last year
- Weight: 9 st 3 lb Allowances; 5 lb for fillies 1 lb for each £5,000 below max. (minimum weight 8 st 2 lb); Penalties; 8 lb for Group winners 5 lb for Listed winners 3 lb for Class 2 winners
- Purse: £250,000 (2025); 1st: £134,092

Weatherbys Super Sprint
2026
Zigazig Ah	Angels Lane	Final Appeal

Previous years
2025
Anthelia	Havana Hurricane	Gaga Mate
2024
Caburn	Vingegaard	Time For Sandals
2023
Relief Rally	Dapperling	Payment In Kind
2022
Eddie's Boy	Woolhampton	Rogue Spirit
2021
Gubbass	Symphony Perfect	Delmona

2020-2011
2020
Happy Romance	Jojo Rabbit	Soldierpoy
2019
Bettys Hope	Show Me Show Me	Mighty Spirit
2018
Ginger Nut	Moojim	Kinks
2017
Bengali Boys	Declarationoflove	Maggies Angel
2016
Mrs Danvers	Stormy Clouds	Clem Fandango
2015
Lathom	Mr Lupton	Field of Vision
2014
Tiggy Wiggy	Haxby	Fast Act
2013
Peniaphobia	Lilbourne Lass	Oasis Town
2012
Body And Soul	Satsuma	Momalorka
2011
Charles The Great	Lily's Angel	Nagham

2010-2001
2010
Temple Meads	Bold Bidder	Move In Time
2009
Monsieur Chevalier	Shamandar	Archers Road
2008
Jargelle	Infamous Angel	Senor Mirasol
2006
Elhamri	Ishi Adiva	We'll Confer
2005
Lady Livius	Nigella	Brandywell Boy
2004
Siena Gold	Don't Tell Mum	Bond City
2003
If Paradise	Cop Hill Lad	Danesmead
2002
Presto Vento	Wunders Dream	Sir Edwin Landseer
2001
Good Girl	Online Investor	Lady Links

2000-1991
2000
Superstar Leo	Elsie Plunkett	Up Tempo
1999
Don Puccini	Halland Park Girl	Cedar Master
1998
Flanders	Open Secret	Monkston Point
1997
Lord Kintyre	Pure Coincidence	Banningham Blade
1996
Miss Stamper	Young Bigwig	Head Over Heels
1995
Blue Iris	Needham Star	Ortolan
1994
Brief Glimpse	Femme Savante	Options Open
1993
Risky	Pommes Frites	Turtle Island
1992
Lyric Fantasy	Aradanza	Princely Favour
1991
Paris House	Harvest Girl	Miss Nosey Parker

The Weatherbys Super Sprint is a flat horse race in Great Britain open to two-year-old thoroughbreds. It is run at Newbury over a distance of 5 furlongs and 34 yards (1,037 metres), and it is scheduled to take place each year in July.

== History ==
The event was established in 1991, and it was initially called the Newbury Sales Super Sprint Trophy. It was designed for horses sold as yearlings by public auction for less than a specified price. The concept was devised by Lord Carnarvon and Richard Hannon Sr.

The weight carried by a horse in the Weatherbys Super Sprint is determined by its sale price, with one pound deducted for each £5,000 below the maximum value.

== Records ==
Leading jockey (2 wins):

- Michael Roberts – Lyric Fantasy (1992), Good Girl (2001)
- Michael Hills – Brief Glimpse (1994), Superstar Leo (2000)
- Richard Hughes - Monsieur Chevalier (2009), Tiggy Wiggy (2014)
- Sean Levey - Happy Romance (2020), Gubbass (2021)

Leading trainer (7 wins):

- Richard Hannon Sr. – Lyric Fantasy (1992), Risky (1993), Miss Stamper (1996), Presto Vento (2002), If Paradise (2003), Lady Livius (2005), Monsieur Chevalier (2009)

== Winners ==
- Weights given in stones and pounds.

Year	Winner	Weight	Jockey	Trainer	Time
1991	Paris House	8-03	John Carroll	Jack Berry	1:02.17
1992	Lyric Fantasy	8-11	Michael Roberts	Richard Hannon Sr.	1:03.22
1993	Risky	8-10	Walter Swinburn	Richard Hannon Sr.	1:04.06
1994	Brief Glimpse	8-02	Michael Hills	David Chappell	1:01.58
1995	Blue Iris	8-01	Willie Carson	Michael Jarvis	1:04.22
1996	Miss Stamper	8-02	David Harrison	Richard Hannon Sr.	1:00.59
1997	Lord Kintyre	8-07	Brett Doyle	Rod Millman	1:00.52
1998	Flanders	8-11	Lindsay Charnock	Tim Easterby	1:02.96
1999	Don Puccini	8-11	John Stack	Bryan Smart	1:01.52
2000	Superstar Leo	8-06	Michael Hills	William Haggas	0:59.19
2001	Good Girl	8-05	Michael Roberts	Tim Easterby	1:00.86
2002	Presto Vento	8-09	Eddie Ahern	Richard Hannon Sr.	1:01.14
2003	If Paradise	8-07	Dane O'Neill	Richard Hannon Sr.	1:01.05
2004	Siena Gold	8-01	Frankie McDonald	Brian Meehan	1:01.89
2005	Lady Livius	8-05	Martin Dwyer	Richard Hannon Sr.	1:01.54
2006	Elhamri	9-04	Declan McDonogh	Sylvester Kirk	1:01.32
2007	Abandoned due to waterlogging
2008	Jargelle	8-06	Liam Jones	William Haggas	1:02.12
2009	Monsieur Chevalier	8-12	Richard Hughes	Richard Hannon Sr.	1:02.86
2010	Temple Meads	8-06	Richard Mullen	Ed McMahon	1:03.55
2011	Charles the Great	8-11	Jimmy Fortune	Andrew Balding	1:03.53
2012	Body and Soul	7-12	Duran Fentiman	Tim Easterby	1:06.55
2013	Peniaphobia	8-08	Paul Hanagan	Richard Fahey	0:59.50
2014	Tiggy Wiggy	9-01	Richard Hughes	Richard Hannon Jr.	0:59.85
2015	Lathom	9-00	Tony Hamilton	Richard Fahey	1:00.76
2016	Mrs Danvers	8-00	Luke Morris	Jonathan Portman	1:01.19
2017	Bengali Boys	8-07	Barry McHugh	Richard Fahey	1:04.05
2018	Ginger Nut	8-05	Harry Bentley	Richard Hannon Jr.	1:01.85
2019	Bettys Hope	8-04	Silvestre de Sousa	Rod Millman	1:05.32
2020	Happy Romance	8-05	Sean Levey	Richard Hannon Jr.	1:00.82
2021	Gubbass	8-10	Sean Levey	Richard Hannon Jr.	1:00.54
2022	Eddie's Boy	9-02	Hollie Doyle	Archie Watson	1:00.33
2023	Relief Rally	9-00	Tom Marquand	William Haggas	1:01.25
2024	Caburn	9-01	Dylan Hogan	Jack Jones	1:00.10
2025	Anthelia	8-08	Lewis Edmunds	Rod Millman	1:01.18
2026	Zigazig Ah	8-04	Saffie Osborne	Richard Spencer	0:59:64

== See also ==
- Horse racing in Great Britain
- List of British flat horse races
