= Lyric Fantasy =

Irish-bred Thoroughbred racehorse

- Sire: Tate Gallery
- Grandsire: Northern Dancer
- Dam: Flying Melody
- Damsire: Auction Ring
- Sex: Mare
- Foaled: 30 January 1990
- Country: Ireland
- Colour: Chestnut
- Breeder: Minch Bloodstock
- Owner: Lord Carnarvon; Susan Magnier
- Trainer: Richard Hannon Sr.
- Record: 10: 6-1-0
- Earnings: £328,826

Major wins
- National Stakes (1992); Queen Mary Stakes (1992); Newbury Sales Super Sprint (1992); Nunthorpe Stakes (1992)

Awards
- European Champion Two-Year-Old Filly (1992)
- Last updated on January 12, 2007

Lyric Fantasy was an Irish-bred, British-trained champion Thoroughbred racehorse. She was named European Champion Two-Year-Old Filly at the 1992 Cartier Racing Awards, and was the highest rated filly in the International Classification. In her championship season Lyric Fantasy won five of her six races including the Group Three Queen Mary Stakes and the Newbury Sales Super Sprint. Her most notable win however, was in the Nunthorpe Stakes in which she became one of only three juveniles to win a Group One race in open-age competition. Her speed and diminutive stature led to her being nicknamed "The Pocket Rocket".

== Background ==
Lyric Fantasy, a small (often described as "tiny") bay filly, was sired by Tate Gallery out of the Auction Ring mare Flying Melody. She was bred in Ireland by the County Cork based Minch Bloosdtock.

Tate Gallery, who won the National Stakes as a two-year-old, was a full-brother to multiple champion sire Sadler's Wells. Lyric Fantasy was the best horse he sired before his death in 1990. Flying Melody was a successful racehorse who produced several other winners, most notably the European Champion Sprinter Royal Applause and the Dewhurst Stakes winner In Command. As a descendant of the broodmare Oola Hills, Lyric Fantasy was related to notable thoroughbreds including Park Top and Pappa Fourway.

Lyric Fantasy was sent to the sales as a yearling and was sold for 12,500 gns to Heron Bloodstock. At the end of her two-year-old season she was sold for 340,000 gns at Tattersalls to Paul Shanahan, a representative of John Magnier. She was trained throughout her career by Richard Hannon Sr. and was ridden in her championship year by Michael Roberts.

Lyric Fantasy was reportedly named after a painting by Augustus John which hung in the Tate Gallery.

== Racing career ==
=== 1992: two-year-old season ===
==== Spring ====
Lyric Fantasy never ran in a maiden race instead beginning her career against more experienced fillies in the Lady Caroline Stakes at Windsor in April. She raced prominently and ran on strongly in the closing stages to win by half a length from the future Premio Regina Elena winner Ancestral Dancer. A month later she was moved up to Listed class for the National Stakes at Sandown Park. She took the lead at half way and quickly pulled clear to win by six lengths.

==== Summer ====
Lyric Fantasy was then sent to Royal Ascot for the Queen Mary Stakes for which she was made 11/8 favourite. Roberts let her lead from the start and she went clear to record an "impressive" five length win. Her winning time of 59.72 broke the all-aged course record.

Her next target was the Super Sprint Trophy at Newbury. This race is restricted to two-year-olds who have been sold at auction, with the basic weights being set by the sale price. As Lyric Fantasy had been a relatively cheap yearling, the race was an obvious target, although there were concerns about the soft ground. She was made 2/5 favourite and was never in danger of defeat, showing "blistering early speed" to take the lead after a furlong and drawing steadily away to win easily by six lengths. After the race, Richard Hannon paid tribute to his filly saying, "she's only tiny, but her speed is breathtaking and she improves from race to race." A week later, the form of her Ascot win was boosted when Marina Park, who had been beaten nine lengths by Lyric Fantasy, won the Group Three Princess Margaret Stakes.

Hannon then took the unusual decision to run Lyric Fantasy against colts and older horses in the Nunthorpe Stakes at York. The fact that there are no European Group One races restricted to two-year-olds over five furlongs sometimes leads trainers to enter juveniles in races like the Nunthorpe and the Prix de l'Abbaye, but these attempts are rarely successful. The last success for a two-year-old in open Group One competition had been Sigy in the 1978 Prix de l'Abbaye, although Paris House had finished second in the Nunthorpe in 1991. Lyric Fantasy was made 8/11 favourite despite the presence in the field of her stable companion, the July Cup winner Mr Brooks. In the race Roberts, who had been surviving on "virtually no food" to ride at 7-8 (120 pounds), kept the filly in behind the pace before sending her to the lead two furlongs out. As expected, Mr Brooks emerged as the main challenger, but Lyric Fantasy ran on strongly to win by half a length. After the race she was offered at 14/1 for the following year's 1000 Guineas although doubts were expressed about whether her "precocious brilliance" would be as effective over a mile.

==== Autumn ====
On her final appearance Lyric Fantasy was moved up to six furlongs for the first time for the Cheveley Park Stakes at Newmarket. Only three fillies opposed her, but they included the Moyglare Stud Stakes winner Sayyedati, and Poker Chip, who had won the Flying Childers Stakes. Roberts tracked Walter Swinburn on Sayyedati before making his challenge a furlong out. On this occasion however, Lyric Fantasy could make no progress against the leader and was beaten two lengths. There were no real excuses, although she did not look impressive before the race and may not have been suited by being held up.

=== 1993: three-year-old season ===
On her three-year-old debut, Lyric Fantasy was sent straight for the 1000 Guineas at Newmarket, in which she was ridden by Michael Kinane. In her only attempt at the one mile distance she finished sixth of the twelve runners, beaten just under three lengths by Sayyedati after apparently failing to stay. On the same course a month later, she was dropped down to Listed class and recorded a "comfortable" win over six furlongs.

Her last two starts were disappointing, despite returning to the minimum distance of five furlongs. She ran unplaced behind Elbio in the King's Stand Stakes at Royal Ascot and then finished last of the eleven starters behind Lochsong in the Nunthorpe.

== Race record ==
Date	Race	Dist (f)	Course	Class	Prize (£K)	Odds	Runners	Placing	Margin	Time	Jockey	Trainer
27 April 1992	Lady Caroline Stakes	5	Windsor	M	2	3/1	7	1	0.5	0:59.40	Michael Roberts	Richard Hannon Sr.
26 May 1992	National Stakes	5	Sandown	Listed	6	2/1	5	1	6	0:59.62	Michael Roberts	Richard Hannon Sr.
17 June 1992	Queen Mary Stakes	5	Ascot	3	23	11/8	13	1	5	0:59.72	Michael Roberts	Richard Hannon Sr.
18 July 1992	Super Sprint Trophy	5	Newbury		59	2/5	11	1	6	1:03.22	Michael Roberts	Richard Hannon Sr.
20 August 1992	Nunthorpe Stakes	5	York	1	93	8/11	11	1	0.5	0:57.39	Michael Roberts	Richard Hannon Sr.
30 September 1992	Cheveley Park Stakes	6	Newmarket Rowley	1	74	1/2	4	2	2	1:11.82	Michael Roberts	Richard Hannon Sr.
29 April 1993	1000 Guineas	8	Newmarket Rowley	1	107	14/1	12	6	3	1:37.34	Michael Kinane	Richard Hannon Sr.
22 May 1993	Charlotte Fillies Stakes	6	Newmarket Rowley	Listed	10	1/3	6	1	0.75	1:13.54	Pat Eddery	Richard Hannon Sr.
18 June 1993	King's Stand Stakes	5	Ascot	2	60	7/2	8	7	13.5	1:03.80	Pat Eddery	Richard Hannon Sr.
19 August 1993	Nunthorpe Stakes	5	York	1	87	8/1	11	11	14	0:58.12	Pat Eddery	Richard Hannon Sr.

== Assessment ==
At the 1992 Cartier Racing Awards, Lyric Fantasy was named European Champion Two-Year-Old Filly.

She was also officially rated the best two-year-old filly in Europe in the International Classification.

== Stud career ==
Lyric Fantasy produced at least ten foals. She has two known winners: El Faro (by Woodman) and Fusaichi Seishiro (by Fusaichi Pegasus).

== Pedigree ==
Pedigree of Lyric Fantasy (IRE), bay mare, 1990
Sire Tate Gallery (USA) 1983	Northern Dancer; 1961	Nearctic	Nearco
Sire Tate Gallery (USA) 1983	Northern Dancer; 1961	Nearctic	Lady Angela
Sire Tate Gallery (USA) 1983	Northern Dancer; 1961	Natalma	Native Dancer
Sire Tate Gallery (USA) 1983	Northern Dancer; 1961	Natalma	Almahmoud
Sire Tate Gallery (USA) 1983	Fairy Bridge; 1975	Bold Reason	Hail To Reason
Sire Tate Gallery (USA) 1983	Fairy Bridge; 1975	Bold Reason	Lalun
Sire Tate Gallery (USA) 1983	Fairy Bridge; 1975	Special	Forli
Sire Tate Gallery (USA) 1983	Fairy Bridge; 1975	Special	Thong
Dam Flying Melody (IRE) 1979	Auction Ring; 1972	Bold Bidder	Bold Ruler
Dam Flying Melody (IRE) 1979	Auction Ring; 1972	Bold Bidder	High Bid
Dam Flying Melody (IRE) 1979	Auction Ring; 1972	Hooplah	Hillary
Dam Flying Melody (IRE) 1979	Auction Ring; 1972	Hooplah	Beadah
Dam Flying Melody (IRE) 1979	Whispering Star; 1963	Sound Track	Whistler
Dam Flying Melody (IRE) 1979	Whispering Star; 1963	Sound Track	Bridle Way
Dam Flying Melody (IRE) 1979	Whispering Star; 1963	Peggy West	Premonition
Dam Flying Melody (IRE) 1979	Whispering Star; 1963	Peggy West	Oola Hills (Family: 26)
