= 2004 World Thoroughbred Racehorse Rankings =

The 2004 World Thoroughbred Racehorse Rankings was the inaugural edition of the World Thoroughbred Racehorse Rankings. It is an assessment of racehorses which was issued by the International Federation of Horseracing Authorities (IFHA) in January 2005. It includes horses aged three or older which raced or were trained during 2004 in countries where the flat racing year runs from January 1 to December 31. These countries are generally in the Northern Hemisphere.

The ratings represent a weight value in pounds, with higher values given to horses which showed greater ability. It is judged that these weights would equalize the abilities of the horses if carried in a theoretical handicap race. The list includes all horses rated 115 or above, and it also shows the surface and the distances at which the rating was achieved.

The highest rating in the 2004 season was 130, which was given to the performance of Ghostzapper in the Breeders' Cup Classic. In total, 162 horses were included in the list.

== Full rankings for 2004 ==
- Country foaled – Horse names are followed by a suffix indicating the country where foaled.
- Age – The ages shown for horses foaled in the Northern Hemisphere are as of their universal date of increase, January 1, 2004. The ages of horses born in the Southern Hemisphere are taken from their equivalent date, August 1, 2004.
- Sex – The following abbreviations are used:
  - C – Colt – Ungelded male horse up to four-years-old.
  - F – Filly – Female horse up to four-years-old.
  - H – Horse – Ungelded male horse over four-years-old.
  - M – Mare – Female horse over four-years-old.
  - G – Gelding – Gelded male horse of any age.

Rank	Rating	Horse	Age	Sex	Trained	Surface	Distance (m)
1	130	Ghostzapper (USA)	4	C	United States	Dirt	2,000
2	128	Smarty Jones (USA)	3	C	United States	Dirt	1,900
3	127	Doyen (IRE)	4	C	Great Britain	Turf	2,400
4	126	Bago (FR)	3	C	France	Turf	2,400
4	126	Pleasantly Perfect (USA)	6	H	United States	Dirt	2,000
6	125	Cherry Mix (FR)	3	C	France	Turf	2,400
7	124	Haafhd (GB)	3	C	Great Britain	Turf	2,000
7	124	Medaglia d'Oro (USA)	5	H	United States	Dirt	2,000
9	123	Azamour (IRE)	3	C	Ireland	Turf	2,000
9	123	Grey Swallow (IRE)	3	C	Ireland	Turf	2,400
9	123	Pico Central (BRZ)	5	H	United States	Dirt	1,200
9	123	Rakti (GB)	5	H	Great Britain	Turf	1,600
9	123	Roses in May (USA)	4	C	United States	Dirt	2,000
9	123	Sulamani (IRE)	5	H	Great Britain	Turf	2,000
15	122	Kitten's Joy (USA)	3	C	United States	Turf	2,400
15	122	Lucky Story (USA)	3	C	Great Britain	Turf	1,600
15	122	North Light (IRE)	3	C	Great Britain	Turf	2,400
15	122	Southern Image (USA)	4	C	United States	Dirt	1,800 / 1,900
15	122	Speightstown (USA)	6	H	United States	Dirt	1,200
15	122	Zenno Rob Roy (JPN)	4	C	Japan	Turf	2,400
21	121	Better Talk Now (USA)	5	H	United States	Turf	2,400
21	121	Norse Dancer (IRE)	4	C	Great Britain	Turf	2,000
21	121	Refuse to Bend (IRE)	4	C	Great Britain	Turf	1,600 / 2,000
24	120	Acropolis (IRE)	3	C	Ireland	Turf	2,400
24	120	Birdstone (USA)	3	C	United States	Dirt	2,000 / 2,400
24	120	Durandal (JPN)	5	H	Japan	Turf	1,600
24	120	Hard Buck (BRZ)	5	H	United States	Turf	2,400
24	120	Ouija Board (GB)	3	F	Great Britain	Turf	2,400
24	120	Powerscourt (GB)	4	C	Ireland	Turf	2,000
24	120	Rule of Law (USA)	3	C	Great Britain	Turf	2,900
24	120	Tap Dance City (USA)	7	H	Japan	Turf	2,200
24	120	Tycoon (GB)	3	C	Ireland	Turf	2,400
24	120	Warrsan (IRE)	6	H	Great Britain	Turf	2,000
34	119	Papineau (GB)	4	C	Great Britain	Turf	4,000
34	119	Peace Rules (USA)	4	C	United States	Dirt	1,800 / 2,000
34	119	Perfect Drift (USA)	5	H	United States	Dirt	1,800 / 2,000
34	119	Saint Liam (USA)	4	C	United States	Dirt	1,800
34	119	Shirocco (GER)	3	C	Germany	Turf	2,400
34	119	Soviet Song (IRE)	4	F	Great Britain	Turf	1,600
34	119	Vinnie Roe (IRE)	6	H	Ireland	Turf	2,800 / 3,200
41	118	Attraction (GB)	3	F	Great Britain	Turf	1,600
41	118	Azeri (USA)	6	M	United States	Dirt	1,800
41	118	Bachelor Duke (USA)	3	C	Great Britain	Turf	1,600
41	118	Bandari (IRE)	5	H	Great Britain	Turf	2,400
41	118	Electrocutionist (USA)	3	C	Italy	Turf	2,400
41	118	Gamut (IRE)	5	H	Great Britain	Turf	2,400
41	118	Kela (USA)	6	H	United States	Dirt	1,200 / 1,400
41	118	Let the Lion Roar (GB)	3	C	Great Britain	Turf	2,400
41	118	Midas Eyes (USA)	4	C	United States	Dirt	1,400
41	118	Nayyir (GB)	6	H	Great Britain	Turf	1,600
41	118	Sightseek (USA)	5	M	United States	Dirt	1,800
41	118	Singletary (USA)	4	C	United States	Turf	1,600
41	118	Snow Ridge (IRE)	3	C	Great Britain	Turf	1,600
41	118	Somnus (GB)	4	G	Great Britain	Turf	1,400
41	118	Westerner (GB)	5	H	France	Turf	3,100
41	118	Whipper (USA)	3	C	France	Turf	1,600
57	117	Ancient World (USA)	4	G	Great Britain	Turf	1,600
57	117	Antonius Pius (USA)	3	C	Ireland	Turf	1,600
57	117	Ashado (USA)	3	F	United States	Dirt	1,800
57	117	Chic (GB)	4	F	Great Britain	Turf	1,600
57	117	Chorist (GB)	5	M	Great Britain	Turf	2,000
57	117	Cosmo Bulk (JPN)	3	C	Japan	Turf	2,400
57	117	Diamond Green (FR)	3	C	France	Turf	1,600
57	117	Egerton (GER)	3	C	Germany	Turf	2,400
57	117	Epalo (GER)	5	H	Germany	Turf	2,000
57	117	Kicken Kris (USA)	4	C	United States	Turf	2,000
57	117	King Kamehameha (JPN)	3	C	Japan	Turf	1,600 / 2,400
57	117	Latice (IRE)	3	F	France	Turf	2,100
57	117	Lion Heart (USA)	3	C	United States	Dirt	2,000
57	117	Magistretti (USA)	4	C	United States	Turf	2,400
57	117	Millenary (GB)	7	H	Great Britain	Turf	2,800 / 3,600
57	117	Mr Dinos (IRE)	5	H	Great Britain	Turf	3,200
57	117	Mubtaker (USA)	7	H	Great Britain	Turf	2,600
57	117	Quiff (GB)	3	F	Great Britain	Turf	2,400
57	117	Russian Rhythm (USA)	4	F	Great Britain	Turf	1,600
57	117	Simonas (IRE)	5	H	Germany	Turf	2,400
57	117	Special Ring (USA)	7	H	United States	Turf	1,800
57	117	Total Impact (CHI)	6	H	United States	Dirt	2,000
57	117	Touch of Land (FR)	4	C	France	Turf	2,000
57	117	Var (USA)	5	H	Great Britain	Turf	1,000
57	117	Voix du Nord (FR)	3	C	France	Turf	2,100
82	116	Adoration (USA)	5	M	United States	Dirt	1,800
82	116	Alexander Goldrun (IRE)	3	F	Ireland	Turf	2,000
82	116	Altieri (GB)	6	H	Italy	Turf	2,000
82	116	Bayamo (IRE)	5	H	United States	Turf	1,800
82	116	Blue Canari (FR)	3	C	France	Turf	2,400
82	116	Delta Blues (JPN)	3	C	Japan	Turf	2,400
82	116	Funny Cide (USA)	4	G	United States	Dirt	2,000
82	116	Grey Lilas (IRE)	3	F	France	Turf	1,600
82	116	Ikhtyar (IRE)	4	C	Great Britain	Turf	2,000
82	116	Intendant (GER)	3	C	Germany	Turf	2,000
82	116	Meteor Storm (GB)	5	H	United States	Turf	2,000
82	116	Millemix (FR)	3	C	France	Turf	2,100
82	116	Mister Monet (IRE)	3	C	Great Britain	Turf	2,000 / 2,100
82	116	Mr O'Brien (IRE)	5	H	United States	Turf	1,600 / 2,200
82	116	Policy Maker (IRE)	4	C	France	Turf	2,400
82	116	Prince Kirk (FR)	4	C	Italy	Turf	1,800
82	116	Silk Famous (JPN)	5	H	Japan	Turf	2,200 / 2,400
82	116	Soldier Hollow (GB)	4	C	Germany	Turf	2,000
82	116	Stroll (USA)	4	C	United States	Turf	1,800
82	116	Strong Hope (USA)	4	C	United States	Dirt	1,400
82	116	Tsurumaru Boy (JPN)	6	H	Japan	Turf	1,600
82	116	Valixir (IRE)	3	C	France	Turf	2,000 / 2,400
104	115	Admire Don (JPN)	5	H	Japan	Dirt	1,600 / 2,000
104	115	American Post (GB)	3	C	France	Turf	1,600
104	115	Artie Schiller (USA)	3	C	United States	Turf	1,800 / 2,000
104	115	Ashdown Express (IRE)	5	H	Great Britain	Turf	1,200 / 1,400
104	115	Bahamian Pirate (USA)	9	G	Great Britain	Turf	1,000
104	115	Bluesthestandard (USA)	7	G	United States	Dirt	1,200
104	115	Cacique (IRE)	3	C	France	Turf	2,000
104	115	Cape of Good Hope (GB)	6	H	Hong Kong	Turf	1,000
104	115	Calstone Light O (JPN)	6	H	Japan	Turf	1,200
104	115	Designed for Luck (USA)	7	G	United States	Turf	1,600
104	115	Dynever (USA)	4	C	United States	Dirt	1,800
104	115	Ema Bovary (CHI)	5	M	United States	Dirt	1,200
104	115	Even the Score (USA)	6	H	United States	Dirt	1,800
104	115	Evening Attire (USA)	6	G	United States	Dirt	2,000
104	115	Execute (FR)	7	H	France	Turf	2,100
104	115	Film Maker (USA)	4	F	United States	Turf	2,200
104	115	Firebreak (GB)	5	H	Great Britain	Dirt / Turf	1,400 / 1,600
104	115	Groom Tesse (GB)	3	C	Italy	Turf	2,400
104	115	Ingrandire (JPN)	5	H	Japan	Turf	3,200
104	115	Intercontinental (GB)	4	F	United States	Turf	1,600
104	115	Island Fashion (USA)	4	F	United States	Dirt	1,400 / 2,000
104	115	Lincoln (JPN)	4	C	Japan	Turf	2,200
104	115	Lundy's Liability (BRZ)	4	C	United States	Dirt	1,800
104	115	Lune d'Or (FR)	3	F	France	Turf	2,000
104	115	Maraahel (IRE)	3	C	Great Britain	Turf	2,900
104	115	Midway Road (USA)	4	C	United States	Dirt	1,900
104	115	Mikado (GB)	3	C	Ireland	Turf	2,900
104	115	Millionaia (IRE)	3	F	France	Turf	2,100
104	115	My Cousin Matt (USA)	5	G	United States	Dirt	1,200
104	115	Narita Century (JPN)	5	H	Japan	Turf	2,400
104	115	Nothing to Lose (USA)	4	C	United States	Turf	1,600
104	115	Oriental Magic (IRE)	4	C	GB / HK	Turf	2,000
104	115	Our New Recruit (USA)	5	H	United States	Dirt	1,200
104	115	Paolini (GER)	7	H	Germany	Turf	1,777
104	115	Passing Glance (GB)	5	H	Great Britain	Turf	1,700
104	115	Patavellian (IRE)	6	G	Great Britain	Turf	1,200
104	115	Percussionist (IRE)	3	C	Great Britain	Turf	2,400
104	115	Phoenix Reach (IRE)	4	C	Great Britain	Turf	2,400
104	115	Pivotal Point (GB)	4	G	Great Britain	Turf	1,200
104	115	Pohave (USA)	6	G	United States	Dirt	1,200
104	115	Polish Summer (GB)	7	H	France	Turf	2,400
104	115	Prospect Park (GB)	3	C	France	Turf	2,400
104	115	Purge (USA)	3	C	United States	Dirt	1,800
104	115	Read the Footnotes (USA)	3	C	United States	Dirt	1,800
104	115	Request for Parole (USA)	5	H	United States	Turf	2,200 / 2,400
104	115	Sabiango (GER)	6	H	United States	Turf	2,000
104	115	Salselon (GB)	5	H	Great Britain	Turf	1,600
104	115	Senex (GER)	4	C	Germany	Turf	2,400
104	115	Society Selection (USA)	3	F	United States	Dirt	2,000
104	115	Star over the Bay (USA)	6	G	United States	Turf	2,000
104	115	Sweet Return (GB)	4	C	United States	Turf	1,600 / 1,800
104	115	Tante Rose (IRE)	4	F	Great Britain	Turf	1,200
104	115	Telegnosis (JPN)	5	H	Japan	Turf	1,600
104	115	Ten Most Wanted (USA)	4	C	United States	Dirt	1,800
104	115	The Cliff's Edge (USA)	3	C	United States	Dirt	1,800 / 2,000
104	115	The Tatling (IRE)	7	G	Great Britain	Turf	1,000
104	115	Time Paradox (JPN)	6	H	Japan	Dirt	2,100
104	115	Vallee Enchantee (IRE)	4	F	France	Turf	2,400
104	115	Wonder Again (USA)	5	M	United States	Turf	1,800 / 2,200

Certain horses may have also recorded a lesser rating over a distance different from that listed above. The IFHA publishes this information when the lower rating represents the overall top performance in a particular category. There were seven such additional ratings for this season:

Rank	Rating	Horse	Age	Sex	Trained	Surface	Distance (m)
+	123	Ghostzapper (USA)	4	C	United States	Dirt	1,800
+	122	Haafhd (GB)	3	C	Great Britain	Turf	1,600
+	118	Smarty Jones (USA)	3	C	United States	Dirt	1,800
+	117	Azeri (USA)	6	M	United States	Dirt	2,000
+	116	Quiff (GB)	3	F	Great Britain	Turf	2,900
+	115	Ashado (USA)	3	F	United States	Dirt	2,000
+	115	Azeri (USA)	6	M	United States	Dirt	1,200

== Top ranked horses ==
The tables below show the top ranked horses overall, the top fillies and mares, and the top three-year-olds in the 2004 Rankings. They also show the top performers in various subdivisions of each group, which are defined by the distances of races, and the surfaces on which they are run. The IFHA recognizes five distance categories — Sprint, Mile, Intermediate, Long and Extended — identified by the acronym "SMILE". These are framed as follows:

- Sprint: 1,000–1,300m (1,000–1,599m for races in Canada and the United States)
- Mile: 1,301–1,899m (1,600–1,899m for races in Canada and the United States)
- Intermediate: 1,900–2,100m
- Long: 2,101–2,700m
- Extended: 2,701m +

All Horses
	All Surfaces	Dirt	Turf
All Distances	130 – Ghostzapper	130 – Ghostzapper	127 – Doyen
Sprint	123 – Pico Central	123 – Pico Central	117 – Var
Mile	123 – Ghostzapper; 123 – Rakti	123 – Ghostzapper	123 – Rakti
Intermediate	130 – Ghostzapper	130 – Ghostzapper	124 – Haafhd
Long	127 – Doyen	120 – Birdstone	127 – Doyen
Extended	120 – Rule of Law	not listed	120 – Rule of Law
Fillies and Mares
	All Surfaces	Dirt	Turf
All Distances	120 – Ouija Board	118 – Azeri; 118 – Sightseek	120 – Ouija Board
Sprint	115 – Azeri; 115 – Ema Bovary; 115 – Island Fashion; 115 – Tante Rose	115 – Azeri; 115 – Ema Bovary; 115 – Island Fashion	115 – Tante Rose
Mile	119 – Soviet Song	118 – Azeri; 118 – Sightseek	119 – Soviet Song
Intermediate	117 – Azeri; 117 – Chorist; 117 – Latice	117 – Azeri	117 – Chorist; 117 – Latice
Long	120 – Ouija Board	not listed	120 – Ouija Board
Extended	116 – Quiff	not listed	116 – Quiff
Three-Year-Olds
	All Surfaces	Dirt	Turf
All Distances	128 – Smarty Jones	128 – Smarty Jones	126 – Bago
Sprint	not listed	not listed	not listed
Mile	122 – Haafhd; 122 – Lucky Story	118 – Smarty Jones	122 – Haafhd; 122 – Lucky Story
Intermediate	128 – Smarty Jones	128 – Smarty Jones	124 – Haafhd
Long	126 – Bago	120 – Birdstone	126 – Bago
Extended	120 – Rule of Law	not listed	120 – Rule of Law
