= Lucky Story =

American-bred Thoroughbred racehorse

- Racing silks of Abdulla Buhaleeba
- Sire: Kris S
- Grandsire: Roberto
- Dam: Spring Flight
- Damsire: Miswaki
- Sex: Stallion
- Foaled: 1 February 2001
- Country: United States
- Colour: Bay or brown
- Breeder: WinStar Farm
- Owner: Abdulla Buhaleeba; Gainsborough Stud
- Trainer: Mark Johnston
- Record: 9: 4–2–0
- Earnings: £200,793

Major wins
- Vintage Stakes (2003); Champagne Stakes (2003)

Awards
- Top-rated British two-year-old colt (2003)

Lucky Story (foaled 1 February 2001 – 12 May 2010) was an American-bred, British-trained Thoroughbred racehorse. Although he never won a Group 1 race in a career badly disrupted by injury he was rated one of the best horses of his generation at two and three years of age. After finishing fourth on his debut he won his remaining four starts as a juvenile in 2003 including the Vintage Stakes and Champagne Stakes. He failed to win in four starts as a three-year-old but produced a career-best performance when narrowly beaten in the Queen Elizabeth II Stakes. He was retired from racing and had some success as a breeding stallion before dying in 2010 at the age of nine.

== Background ==
Lucky Story was a bay or brown horse bred in Kentucky by WinStar Farm. As a yearling in 2002 he was put up for auction at the Keeneland September Yearling Sale and was bought for $95,000 by representatives of Maktoum bin Rashid Al Maktoum's Gainsborough Stud. The colt was sent to Europe where he was leased for racing purposes to Abdulla Buhaleeba and was sent into training with Mark Johnston at Middleham in North Yorkshire.

He was sired by Kris S, who made little impact as a racehorse but sired the winners of more than 20 Group 1/Grade I races, including Symboli Kris S, Brocco and Kris Kin. Lucky Story's dam Spring Flight won eight times when racing in the United States between 1989 and 1992, recording her best win in the Senorita Stakes. Her other foal included Lucky Story's full-brother Dr Fong. She was descended from Misplay, a half-sister to Worth and was therefore a distant relative of Count Fleet.

== Racing career ==
=== 2003: two-year-old season ===
Lucky Story began his racing career by finishing fourth in a minor event at Ayr Racecourse on 29 May. Three weeks later at the same track he started 4/11 favourite for a maiden race over six furlongs at the same track in which he was ridden by Stanley Chin. He took the lead two furlongs out, accelerated clear of his three opponents and won by five lengths despite being eased down in the final strides. The colt made a quick return in a minor event at Pontefract Racecourse ten days later and recorded another decisive win as he pulled away in the final furlong to come home six lengths clear of Mac The Knife.

For his next appearance, Lucky Story was moved up in class to contest the Group 2 Vintage Stakes over seven furlongs at Goodwood Racecourse on 30 July. Ridden as on two of his three previous starts by Keith Dalgleish he was made the 6/5 favourite, with the best fancied of his eight opponents being The Mighty Tiger, Kings Point (winner of the Superlative Stakes) and Nevisian Lad (July Stakes). After racing just behind the leaders he went to the front two furlongs out and kept on well to win by one and a quarter lengths from The Mighty Tiger.

Darryll Holland took over from Dalgleish when Lucky Story started 2/1 second favourite behind Haafhd in the Group 2 Champagne Stakes at Doncaster Racecourse on 12 September. In a change of tactics he led from the start and held on under pressure to win by a neck from the Michael Stoute-trained Auditorium despite hanging to the right in the final furlong. After the race it was reported that Johnston regarded the colt as his best prospect since Mister Baileys.

A month later the form of the race was boosted when the fifth-placed finisher Milk It Mick won the Group 1 Dewhurst Stakes. The Dewhurst had been intended as Lucky Story's final run of the season but was withdrawn by Johnston two days before the race after the colt performed poorly in a training gallop.

In the 2003 International Classification for two-year-olds Lucky Story was given a rating of 118, making him the fourth-best European juvenile of the year behind Bago, Attraction and Grey Swallow. He shared his rating with Milk It Mick and Three Valleys making him the joint-highest British-trained colt of his generation.

=== 2004: three-year-old season ===
Injury problems meant that Lucky Story was off the track for the first seven months of 2004. After an absence of eleven months the colt returned in the Group 3 Sovereign Stakes over one mile at Salisbury Racecourse on 12 August in which he was matched against older horse. Ridden as in all of his 2004 starts by Holland he took the lead a furlong out but was caught on the line and beaten a short head by the four-year-old Norse Dancer. He was then sent to France Prix du Moulin at Longchamp Racecourse on 5 September but after leading in the early stages he faded to finish seventh of the eleven runners behind Grey Lilas. In the Queen Elizabeth II Stakes at Ascot Racecourse twenty days later he started a 16/1 outsider in an eleven-runner field. Appearing to relish the "searing pace" he took second place in the straight and steadily reeled in the leader Rakti but was still half a length behind at the finish. On his last racecourse appearance Lucky Story disappointed in the Champion Stakes at Newmarket Racecourse on 16 October, coming home ninth of the ten finishers behind Haafhd.

In the 2004 World Thoroughbred Racehorse Rankings Lucky Story was given a rating of 122, making him the fifteenth best racehorse in the world. He was rated the second-best three-year-old trained in Britain, two pounds behind Haafhd and equal to the Epsom Derby winner North Light.

== Stud record ==
Lucky Story was retired to become a breeding stallion at Tweenhills Farm in Gloucestershire. He died in his paddock of a suspected heart attack on 12 May 2010. The stud's director said "We found Lucky Story dead this morning after what would appear sudden death in his sleep. Thankfully there was no sign whatsoever that he had suffered".

The best of his offspring was Art Connoisseur who won the Golden Jubilee Stakes in 2009. His other foals included Lucky Kristale (Lowther Stakes), Annecdote (Oak Tree Stakes), Arpinati (Premio Primi Passi) and Lucky Like (Two-Year-Old Trophy).

== Pedigree ==
Pedigree of Lucky Story (USA), bay or brown stallion, 2001
Sire Kris S. (USA) 1977	Roberto; 1969	Hail To Reason	Turn-To (IRE)
Sire Kris S. (USA) 1977	Roberto; 1969	Hail To Reason	Nothirdchance
Sire Kris S. (USA) 1977	Roberto; 1969	Bramalea	Nashua
Sire Kris S. (USA) 1977	Roberto; 1969	Bramalea	Rarelea
Sire Kris S. (USA) 1977	Sharp Queen; 1965	Princequillo (IRE)	Prince Rose (GB)
Sire Kris S. (USA) 1977	Sharp Queen; 1965	Princequillo (IRE)	Cosquilla (GB)
Sire Kris S. (USA) 1977	Sharp Queen; 1965	Bridgework	Occupy
Sire Kris S. (USA) 1977	Sharp Queen; 1965	Bridgework	Feale Bridge (GB)
Dam Spring Flight (USA) 1987	Miswaki USA; 1978	Mr. Prospector	Raise a Native
Dam Spring Flight (USA) 1987	Miswaki USA; 1978	Mr. Prospector	Gold Digger
Dam Spring Flight (USA) 1987	Miswaki USA; 1978	Hopespringseternal	Buckpasser
Dam Spring Flight (USA) 1987	Miswaki USA; 1978	Hopespringseternal	Rose Bower
Dam Spring Flight (USA) 1987	Coco La Investment (USA); 1975	Coco la Terreur (CAN)	Nearctic
Dam Spring Flight (USA) 1987	Coco La Investment (USA); 1975	Coco la Terreur (CAN)	Ciboulette
Dam Spring Flight (USA) 1987	Coco La Investment (USA); 1975	Great Investment	Saidam
Dam Spring Flight (USA) 1987	Coco La Investment (USA); 1975	Great Investment	Modern (Family: 6-a)
