= Milk It Mick =

British-bred Thoroughbred racehorse

- Sire: Millkom
- Grandsire: Cyrano de Bergerac
- Dam: Lunar Music
- Damsire: Komaite
- Sex: Stallion
- Foaled: 25 March 2001
- Country: United Kingdom
- Colour: Bay
- Breeder: Yvette Dixon
- Owner: Paul Dixon
- Trainer: Jamie Osborne; James M. Cassidy
- Record: 28: 6-4-6
- Earnings: £392,426

Major wins
- Somerville Tattersall Stakes (2003); Dewhurst Stakes (2003); Frank E. Kilroe Mile Handicap (2006)

Awards
- Top-rated British two-year-old colt (2003)

Milk It Mick (foaled 25 March 2001) is a British-bred Thoroughbred racehorse and sire. As a juvenile in 2003 he was highly tried, running twelve times and winning five races including the Somerville Tattersall Stakes and the Dewhurst Stakes. In the same year he was placed in the Chesham Stakes, Washington Singer Stakes and Solario Stakes.

After failing to reproduce his form in the next two seasons and was sent to race in the United States. In 2006 he recorded his first win in almost two and a half years when he won the Grade I Frank E. Kilroe Mile Handicap. He produced several other good efforts in North America but his career was hampered by leg injury and he was retired in May 2007.

He returned to Europe and stood as a breeding stallion in the United Kingdom.

== Background ==
Milk It Mick is a bay horse standing 16.1 hands high with a white star and snip and a white sock on his left hind leg. He was bred in England by Yvette Dixon, the wife of his owner Paul J Dixon. He was named after a friend of the Dixon family who was "always milking it" – taking things to the extreme. The colt was sent into training with Jamie Osborne at Upper Lambourn in Berkshire.

Milk It Mick's sire Millkom was a top-class turf performer whose wins included the Grand Prix de Paris in 1994 and the Man o' War Stakes in 1995. As a breeding stallion his record was unremarkable, as he sired few other horses of any consequence. Lunar Music, the dam of Milk It Mick, was a sprinter who showed considerable durability, but little talent as she won three insignificant races (worth a grand total of £8.103) from thirty-four starts. Her granddam Be My Sweet was a half-sister to Gunner B and a close relative of the dual Cambridgeshire Handicap winner Sterope. As a descendant of the British broodmare York Gala (foaled in 1939) she was a more distant relative of Theatrical and Prince Royal.

== Racing career ==
=== 2003: two-year-old season ===
==== Spring ====
On his racecourse debut Milk It Mick started a 33/1 outsider for a five furlong maiden race at Haydock Park on 19 April and finished fifth of the eighteen runners behind Caldy Dancer. Three weeks later he started 4/6 favourite for a similar event at Beverley Racecourse and recorded his first success as he gained the advantage inside the final furlong and won by three quarters of a length from Harry Up.

==== Summer ====
On 1 June Milk It Mick was moved up in distance and started odds-on favourite for a minor race over six furlongs at Windsor Racecourse in which he was ridden as at Beverley by Martin Dwyer. Carrying top weight of 127 pounds we took the lead from the start and stayed on well in the closing stages to win by one and a quarter lengths from the Richard Hannon, Sr-trained Goblin. The colt was then again stepped in class and distance to contest the Listed Chesham Stakes over seven furlongs at Royal Ascot on 18 June. After chasing the leaders he kept on well in the closing stages to finish third of the thirteen runners behind Pearl of Love and Tycoon. Eight days later at Salisbury Racecourse he started 2/1 favourite for a race over six furlongs in which he was ridden Richard Quinn. He was always traveling easily took the lead a furlong out and won "comfortably" by one and a quarter lengths from Stay Young.

On 9 July Milk It Mick contested the July Stakes over six furlongs at Newmarket Racecourse but appeared to be outpaced in the closing stages and finished fourth of the eight runners behind Nevisian Lad, Cape Fear and Byron. Nine days later in the Listed Rose Bowl Stakes at Newbury Racecourse he finished fourth again beaten just over a length by the winner Venables. In August he was moved back up to seven furlongs for the Washington Singer Stakes at Newbury in which he was ridden by Kieren Fallon and stayed on in the closing stages to finish third of the eight runners behind Haafhd. At the end of the month he started at odds of 9/2 in an eight-runner field for the Group Three Sirenia Stakes at Sandown Park Racecourse and finished second, beaten half a length by Barbajuan after staying on in the closing stages.

==== Autumn ====
On 12 September Milk It Mick started a 20/1 outsider for the Group Two Champagne Stakes at Doncaster Racecourse. He was restrained by Quinn before making some progress approaching the final quarter mile but never looked likely to win and finished fifth behind Lucky Story who won from Auditorium and Haafhd. The 51-year-old Pat Eddery took over the ride when the colt ran in the Group Three Somerville Tattersall Stakes over seven furlongs at Newmarket on 2 October and started at odds of 12/1. The only one of his seven opponents to start at longer odds was Bachelor Duke, who went on to win the Irish 2,000 Guineas. After being hampered at the start he was settled towards the rear of the field before making rapid progress approaching the final furlong. He took the lead in the final strides and won by a neck from the favourite Bayeux with Bachelor Duke another neck away in third.

Despite his win in the Somerville Tattersall Stakes Milk It Mick was given little chance and started at 33/1 when he stepped up to Group One class for the Dewhurst Stakes (his twelfth run of the season) over the same course and distance sixteen days later. He was partnered by Darryll Holland who took the ride after Lucky Story was withdrawn from the race. The Middle Park Stakes winner Three Valleys started favourite ahead of Snow Ridge (Royal Lodge Stakes), Duke of Venice and Haafhd whilst the other runners included Balmont, Antonius Pius (Railway Stakes), Cape Fear and Bachelor Duke. Milk It Mick was held up by Holland towards the rear of the twelve-runner field as the Aidan O'Brien-trained outsider Troubadour set the pace from Duke of Venice. He began to make rapid progress on the wide outside in the last quarter mile and went past Three Valleys to take the lead inside the final furlong. The favourite rallied but Milk It Mick maintained his advantage and won by a head with Haafhd taking third ahead of Bachelor Duke. After the race Holland said "I had my head down and kept pushing. I only got the ride yesterday because Lucky Story came out. But what a ride to get". Osborne commented "He's such a genuine horse. This is the second time we've taken a firm decision on how to ride him. He's out of a five-furlong mare but once we dropped him in and got him to relax he showed he could get home".

=== 2004 & 2005: three and four-year-old seasons ===
On his three-year-old debut started favourite for a Listed International Trial on the synthetic Polytrack surface at Lingfield Park Racecourse on 3 April but finished second of the nine runners behind the outsider Leitrim House. Two weeks later he contested the Greenham Stakes (a major trial race for the 2000 Guineas) at Newbury and was made the 3/1 favourite in a ten-runner field. He tracked the leaders but faded inside the final furlong and finished fifth, beaten four lengths by the winner Salford City. Despite his defeat he took his place in the field for the 2000 Guineas at Newmarket but after starting slowly he never looked likely to win and finished eighth of the fourteen runners behind Haafhd. In his three remaining races of 2004, Milk It Mick was dropped in class but failed to win. He finished third to Mac Love in a minor sprint at Doncaster on 31 July, third to Peter Paul Rubens at Chester Racecourse in August and second to Secret Charm over a mile at Doncaster in September.

Milk It Mick remained in training with Osborne as a four-year-old but made no impact in two races, finishing unplaced at Chester in June and at Doncaster in October.

=== 2006: five-year-old season ===
In 2006 Milk It Mick was sent to race in the United States where he was trained by James M Cassidy. He made a very promising start to his North American career in the Grade II San Marcos Stakes over ten furlongs at Santa Anita Park on 22 January. Ridden by Kent Desormeaux he started a 29/1 outsider but finished second of the eleven runners, beaten a length by The Tin Man. On 4 March at the same track the horse was dropped back in distance, but stepped up in class for the Grade I Frank E Kilroe Mile Stakes and started at odds of 12.4/1 in a thirteen-runner field. Cacique started favourite ahead of the French import Charmo whilst the other runners included Willow O Wisp (Del Mar Derby), Aragorn Senor Swinger (Arlington Handicap), Toasted (Arlington Classic) and Geronimo (Morvich Handicap). Milk It Mick overcame an outside draw to take the lead in the final furlong and held off several late challengers to win by a neck and a short head from Aragorn and Chinese Dragon. Cassidy commented "The whole thing was getting him covered up early, but at the same time, we had to try and get over, being in the 13 post. It was kind of a fine line. Kent used him a little bit to get a position, and he was able to tuck him in. You have to tuck this horse in; otherwise, he would have been on the front end doing his thing".

In April Milk It Mick started favourite for the Grade II Arcadia Handicap at Santa Anita but was beaten into third place behind Silent Name and Chinese Dragon. In May he finished a close third to English Channel in the Turf Classic Stakes at Churchill Downs but was then finished last of the six runners behind Aragorn in the Shoemaker Breeders' Cup Mile at Hollywood Park Racetrack. It was subsequently revealed that the horse had sustained a fractured cannon bone and he missed the rest of the season.

=== 2007: six-year-old season ===
In 2007 Milk It Mick returned to the track after a ten-month absence to attempt to repeat his 2006 success in the Kilroe Mile. Ridden by Mike Smith he finished fifth behind Kip Deville but was only two lengths behind the winner. He failed to improve on his promising debut, finishing seventh in the Arcadia Stakes and then finishing last of ten in the Turf Classic on 5 May. On 30 May it was announced that the horse had been retired with Cassidy saying that Milk It Mick had never been the same since his 2016 injury.

== Assessment ==
In the 2003 International Classification for two-year-olds Milk It Mick was given a rating of 118, making him the fourth-best European juvenile of the year behind Bago, Attraction and Grey Swallow. He shared his rating with Lucky Story and Three Valleys making him the joint-highest British-trained colt of his generation.

== Stud record ==
In August 2007 it was announced that Milk It Mick would begin is career as a breeding stallion in 2008 at the Lone Oak Stud at Newmarket. He stood at the Hedgeholme Stud (County Durham) in 2010, the Haras de la Foret in 2011 and 2012 and the Kelanne Stud (Hampshire) in 2013 before moving to the Norton Grove Stud in North Yorkshire.

The best of his offspring has been Miracle of Medinah who emulated his sire by winning the Somerville Tattersall Stakes in 2013.

== Pedigree ==
Pedigree of Milk It Mick (GB), bay colt, 2001
Sire Millkom (GB) 1991	Cyrano de Bergerac (IRE); 1983	Bold Lad (IRE)	Bold Ruler
Sire Millkom (GB) 1991	Cyrano de Bergerac (IRE); 1983	Bold Lad (IRE)	Barn Pride
Sire Millkom (GB) 1991	Cyrano de Bergerac (IRE); 1983	Miss St Cyr	Brigadier Gerard
Sire Millkom (GB) 1991	Cyrano de Bergerac (IRE); 1983	Miss St Cyr	Miss Paris
Sire Millkom (GB) 1991	Good Game (GB); 1984	Mummy's Game	Mummy's Pet
Sire Millkom (GB) 1991	Good Game (GB); 1984	Mummy's Game	Final game
Sire Millkom (GB) 1991	Good Game (GB); 1984	Bright Brook	Deep Diver
Sire Millkom (GB) 1991	Good Game (GB); 1984	Bright Brook	Caronbrook
Dam Lunar Music (GB) 1994	Komaite (USA); 1983	Nureyev	Northern Dancer
Dam Lunar Music (GB) 1994	Komaite (USA); 1983	Nureyev	Special
Dam Lunar Music (GB) 1994	Komaite (USA); 1983	Brown Berry	Mount Marcy
Dam Lunar Music (GB) 1994	Komaite (USA); 1983	Brown Berry	Brown Baby
Dam Lunar Music (GB) 1994	Lucky Candy (GB); 1982	Lucky Wednesday	Roi Soleil
Dam Lunar Music (GB) 1994	Lucky Candy (GB); 1982	Lucky Wednesday	Pavlova
Dam Lunar Music (GB) 1994	Lucky Candy (GB); 1982	Be My Sweet	Gallivanter
Dam Lunar Music (GB) 1994	Lucky Candy (GB); 1982	Be My Sweet	Sweet Councillor (Family 3-h)
