= Chorist (horse) =

British-bred Thoroughbred racehorse

- Sire: Pivotal
- Grandsire: Polar Falcon
- Dam: Choir Mistress
- Damsire: Chief Singer
- Sex: Mare
- Foaled: 11 February 1999
- Country: United Kingdom
- Colour: Chestnut
- Breeder: Cheveley Park Stud
- Owner: Cheveley Park Stud
- Trainer: William Haggas
- Record: 21: 9-5-3
- Earnings: £423,247

Major wins
- Upavon Fillies' Stakes (2002); Hoppings Stakes (2003); Golden Daffodil Stakes (2003); Blandford Stakes (2003); Pipalong Stakes (2004); Pretty Polly Stakes (2004)

Chorist (foaled 11 February 1999) was a British Thoroughbred racehorse and broodmare. She was a consistent performer at eight to ten furlongs who improved through her four seasons on the track. After running unplaced on her only start as a two-year-old she won four races including the Upavon Fillies' Stakes as a three-year-old in 2002. She improved in the following year when she took the Hoppings Stakes, Golden Daffodil Stakes and Blandford Stakes. At the age of five in 2004 she reached her peak with wins in the Pipalong Stakes and Pretty Polly Stakes as well as finishing second in the Champion Stakes. After her retirement from racing she became a successful broodmare.

== Background ==
Chorist was a chestnut mare with a narrow white blaze and a white sock on her left hind leg bred and owned by the Newmarket based Cheveley Park Stud. She was sent into training with William Haggas at Somerville Lodge stable in Newmarket.

Her sire Pivotal was a top class sprinter who won the King's Stand Stakes and the Nunthorpe Stakes in 1996. He went on to become an "excellent" sire, getting the winners of more than a thousand races across a range of distances including Sariska, Somnus, Farhh, Kyllachy and Immortal Verse. Chorist's dam Choir Mistress was unraced daughter of the Yorkshire Oaks runner-up Blessed Event and produced several other winners as a broodmare. Blessed Event was a daughter of the Preis der Diana winner Friedrichsruh.

== Racing career ==
=== 2001: two-year-old season ===
On her first and only appearance as a two-year-old Chorist contested a maiden race over one mile at Redcar Racecourse on 19 October. Starting at odds of 12/1 in a nineteen-runner field she was never in serious contention and finished eleventh, more than twenty-four lengths behind the winner Macadamia.

=== 2002: three-year-old season ===
On 25 April Chorist began her second season in a maiden at Beverley Racecourse when she threw off her jockey Michael Hills and bolted on the way to the start. Despite her misbehaviour she recovered to win the race, taking the lead in the final strides to beat the favourite Thaqib by a neck.

After running second in a handicap race at Hamilton Park Racecourse in May Chorist was partnered by Kieren Fallon in a minor race at Newbury Racecourse on 6 June and her recorded her second victory as she led from the start and came home one and three quarter lengths ahead of Silence Is Golden. Sixteen days later the filly started 6/1 favourite under a weight of 119 pounds for the Sandringham Handicap at Royal Ascot and finished second to the John Dunlop-trained Tashawak. On 19 July Chorist won her third race of the season rode her to a three length victory in a handicap race over ten furlongs at Newmarket Racecourse, but in a similar event at Goodwood Racecourse two weeks later she finished sixth after being badly hampered three furlongs from the finish. At Salisbury Racecourse twelve days later the filly was stepped up in class for the Listed Upavon Fillies' Stakes in which she was partnered by the veteran Irish jockey Pat Eddery and was matched against older fillies and mares. Starting the 7/2 favourite in an eight-runner field she took the lead approaching the final furlong and kept on well in the closing stages to win by one and three quarter lengths from Fraulein (later to win the E. P. Taylor Stakes).

In September Chorist was sent to Ireland and moved up to Group 3 class for the Blandford Stakes at the Curragh in which she led for most of the way before being overtaken inside the final furlong and beaten half a length by the Ribblesdale Stakes winner Irresistible Jewel. She ended her season in the Group 2 Sun Chariot Stakes at Newmarket on 2 October when she briefly led three furlongs out before fading to finish eighth of the ten runners.

=== 2003: four-year-old season ===
In 2003 Chorist began her season on 14 May at York Racecourse when she was ridden by Eddery and finished second to Zee Zee Top in the Listed Middleton Stakes, beaten a length by the winner. On 28 June the filly was partnered by Fallon in the Hoppings Stakes over ten furlongs at Newcastle Racecourse and started favourite against six opponents headed by the Fillies' Trial Stakes winner Monturani. After taking the lead two furlongs out Chorist held off the challenge of Monturani to win the Listed prize by a head. The Group 3 Golden Daffodil Stakes at Chepstow Racecourse on 25 July saw Chorist start the 9/4 second favourite behind Favourable Terms in four-runner field which was completed by Monturani and the 20/1 outsider Cuddles. Ridden by Darryll Holland, Chorist took the lead from the start and was never seriously challenged, coming home two and a half lengths clear of Favourable Terms.

Chorist was moved up in class and distance for the Group 1 Yorkshire Oaks over one and a half miles at York in August in which she disputed the lead for most of the way before fading in the last quarter mile and finishing last of the eight runners behind Islington. At the Curragh on 14 September Chorist was ridden by Holland when she ran for the second time in the Blandford Stakes and started the 11/8 favourite. She led from the start and drew away from her five opponents to win by four lengths from Dossier (Platinum Stakes) with the Lancashire Oaks winner Place Rouge a length and a half away in third place. On 11 October the filly started joint-favourite for the Princess Royal Stakes at Ascot but faded badly in the last quarter mile and came home third behind Itnab and Summitville, beaten eleven lengths by the winner.

=== 2004: five-year-old season ===
Chorist returned as a five-year-old in the Listed Pipalong Stakes over one mile at Pontefract Racecourse on 7 June and started odds-on favourite against six opponents. Ridden by Fallon, she soon went to the front and pulled well clear in the straight before being eased down to win by one and a quarter lengths from Ice Palace. Nineteen days after her victory at Pontefract, Chorist ran for the third time at the Curragh and started the 7/4 second favourite behind Alexander Goldrun in the Pretty Polly Stakes, a race which had been elevated to Group 1 class for the first time. The other four runners were Soldera (Valiant Stakes), Hanami (winner of the race in 2003), Livadiya (runner-up in the Tattersalls Gold Cup) and Ivowen. With Holland in the saddle, Chorist led from the start and held off a strong and persistent challenge from Alexander Goldrun in the last quarter mile to win by half a length, with a gap of six lengths back to Ivowen in third. William Haggas described the performance as "terrific" while Holland commented "the runner-up got up to me but I always knew I had her beat".

On 31 July Chorist started favourite for the Nassau Stakes at Goodwood but was beaten a short head and a neck by Favourable Terms and Silence Is Golden in a three-way photo finish. In August the mare was sent to France for the first time and finished third to Whortleberry and Pride in the Group 1 Prix Jean Romanet over 2000 metres on very soft ground at Deauville Racecourse. On her final racecourse appearance Chorist was matched against male opposition in the Champion Stakes at Newmarket on 16 October and started a 20/1 outsider in an eleven-runner field. She produced arguably the best performance of her track career as she went to the front three furlongs out before being overtaken and beaten into second by Haafhd with Azamour, Refuse To Bend, Doyen and Lucky Story finishing behind.

== Breeding record ==
At the end of her racing career, Chorist returned to the Cheveley Park Stud to become a broodmare. She produced at least seven foals and four winners:

- Kings Chorister, a chestnut colt (later gelded), foaled in 2006, sired by King's Best. Won one race on the flat and six National Hunt races.
- Church Melody, bay filly, 2007, by Oasis Dream. Unraced.
- Figaro, chestnut colt (gelded), 2008, by Medicean. Won two flat races and one National Hunt races.
- Gospel Choir, chestnut colt (gelded), 2009, by Galileo. Won seven races including the Jockey Club Stakes and Yorkshire Cup.
- Sennockian Star, chestnut colt (gelded), 2010, by Rock of Gibraltar. Won fifteen races including the City and Suburban Handicap and Doonside Cup.
- Chapel Choir, grey filly, 2012, by Dalakhani. Failed to win in five races.
- Sennockian Song, chestnut colt (gelded), 2013, by New Approach. Failed to win in twelve races.

== Pedigree ==
Pedigree of Chorist (GB), chestnut mare, 1999
Sire Pivotal (GB) 1993	Polar Falcon (USA); 1987	Nureyev	Northern Dancer (CAN)
Sire Pivotal (GB) 1993	Polar Falcon (USA); 1987	Nureyev	Special
Sire Pivotal (GB) 1993	Polar Falcon (USA); 1987	Marie d'Argonne (FR)	Jefferson (GB)
Sire Pivotal (GB) 1993	Polar Falcon (USA); 1987	Marie d'Argonne (FR)	Mohair
Sire Pivotal (GB) 1993	Fearless Revival; 1987	Cozzene (USA)	Caro (IRE)
Sire Pivotal (GB) 1993	Fearless Revival; 1987	Cozzene (USA)	Ride The Trails
Sire Pivotal (GB) 1993	Fearless Revival; 1987	Stufida	Bustino
Sire Pivotal (GB) 1993	Fearless Revival; 1987	Stufida	Zerbinetta
Dam Choir Mistress (GB) 1990	Chief Singer (IRE); 1981	Ballad Rock	Bold Lad
Dam Choir Mistress (GB) 1990	Chief Singer (IRE); 1981	Ballad Rock	True Rocket
Dam Choir Mistress (GB) 1990	Chief Singer (IRE); 1981	Principia (FR)	Le Fabuleux
Dam Choir Mistress (GB) 1990	Chief Singer (IRE); 1981	Principia (FR)	Pia
Dam Choir Mistress (GB) 1990	Blessed Event (IRE); 1984	Kings Lake (USA)	Nijinsky (CAN)
Dam Choir Mistress (GB) 1990	Blessed Event (IRE); 1984	Kings Lake (USA)	Fish-Bar (IRE)
Dam Choir Mistress (GB) 1990	Blessed Event (IRE); 1984	Friedrichsruh (FR)	Dschingis Khan (GER)
Dam Choir Mistress (GB) 1990	Blessed Event (IRE); 1984	Friedrichsruh (FR)	Friedensbotschaft (GER) (Family: 20-c)
