= 2004 Epsom Derby =

- Location: Epsom Downs Racecourse
- Date: 5 June 2004
- Winning horse: North Light
- Starting price: 7/2 jf
- Jockey: Kieren Fallon
- Trainer: Sir Michael Stoute
- Owner: Ballymacoll Stud

Epsom Derby 2004
1–2–3
North Light	Rule of Law	Let The Lion Roar

Also Ran
4–5–6
Percussionist	Salford City	American Post
7–8–9
Snow Ridge	Hazyview	Pukka
10–11–12
Gatwick	Massif Centrale	Coming Again
13 14
Elshadi	Meath	14 Ran

The 2004 Epsom Derby was a horse race that took place at Epsom Downs on Saturday 5 June 2004. It was the 225th running of the Derby, won by the pre-race joint favourite North Light. The winner was ridden by Kieren Fallon and trained by Sir Michael Stoute. The other joint favourite Snow Ridge finished seventh.

== Race details ==
- Sponsor: Vodafone
- Winner's prize money: £788,220
- Going: Good
- Number of runners: 14
- Winner's time: 2m 33.72s

== Full result ==
	*	Horse	Jockey	Trainer ^{†}	SP
1		North Light	Kieren Fallon	Sir Michael Stoute	7/2 jf
2	1½	Rule of Law	Kerrin McEvoy	Saeed bin Suroor	20/1
3	hd	Let the Lion Roar	Michael Kinane	John Dunlop	14/1
4	hd	Percussionist	Kevin Darley	John Gosden	7/1
5	3	Salford City	Johnny Murtagh	David Elsworth	8/1
6	1½	American Post	Richard Hughes	Criquette Head-Maarek (FR)	13/2
7	1¾	Snow Ridge	Frankie Dettori	Saeed bin Suroor	7/2 jf
8	hd	Hazyview	Eddie Ahern	Neville Callaghan	40/1
9	1½	Pukka	Darryll Holland	Luca Cumani	10/1
10	2½	Gatwick	Richard Quinn	Mick Channon	16/1
11	nk	Massif Centrale	Dane O'Neill	David Elsworth	100/1
12	19	Coming Again	Michael Hills	Barry Hills	80/1
13	1¼	Elshadi	Martin Dwyer	Marcus Tregoning	25/1
14	7	Meath	Jamie Spencer	Aidan O'Brien (IRE)	16/1

* The distances between the horses are shown in lengths or shorter. hd = head; nk = neck.
† Trainers are based in Great Britain unless indicated.

== Winner's details ==
Further details of the winner, North Light:

- Foaled: 1 March 2001 in Ireland
- Sire: Danehill; Dam: Sought Out (Rainbow Quest)
- Owner: Ballymacoll Stud
- Breeder: Ballymacoll Stud Farm Ltd
- Rating in 2004 World Thoroughbred Racehorse Rankings: 122

== Form analysis ==
=== Two-year-old races ===
Notable runs by the future Derby participants as two-year-olds in 2003.

- Rule of Law – 1st Acomb Stakes, 3rd Royal Lodge Stakes
- Let the Lion Roar – 2nd Haynes, Hanson and Clark Stakes
- American Post – 1st Prix Jean-Luc Lagardère, 1st Racing Post Trophy
- Snow Ridge – 1st Royal Lodge Stakes, 9th Dewhurst Stakes
- Elshadi – 1st Haynes, Hanson and Clark Stakes, 4th Autumn Stakes

=== The road to Epsom ===
Early-season appearances in 2004 and trial races prior to running in the Derby.

- North Light – 1st Dante Stakes
- Rule of Law – 2nd Dante Stakes
- Let the Lion Roar – 3rd Dante Stakes
- Percussionist – 1st Lingfield Derby Trial
- Salford City – 1st Greenham Stakes, 6th 2,000 Guineas
- American Post – 1st Prix Omnium II, 1st Prix de Fontainebleau, 1st Poule d'Essai des Poulains
- Snow Ridge – 2nd 2,000 Guineas
- Hazyview – 1st Newmarket Stakes, 2nd Lingfield Derby Trial, 1st Fairway Stakes
- Gatwick – 1st Haydock Silver Bowl
- Meath – 2nd Leopardstown 2,000 Guineas Trial Stakes, 2nd Amethyst Stakes, 1st Gallinule Stakes

=== Subsequent Group 1 wins ===
Group 1 / Grade I victories after running in the Derby.

- Rule of Law – St. Leger (2004)

== Subsequent breeding careers ==
Leading progeny of participants in the 2004 Epsom Derby.

=== Sires of Classic winners ===
North Light (1st)

- Arctic Cosmos - 1st St Leger Stakes (2010)
- Celtic New Year - 2nd Charles Whittingham Memorial Handicap (2011)

=== Sires of Group/Grade One winners ===
American Post (6th)

- Robin Of Navan - 1st Critérium de Saint-Cloud (2015)
- Ana Americana - 3rd Prix Saint-Alary (2009)
- Liliside - 1st(disqualified) Poule d'Essai des Pouliches (2010) dam of Lys Gracieux (Japanese Horse of the Year 2019)
- Got Away - 1st Charnwood Forest Mares' Chase (2018)

=== Other Stallions ===
Let The Lion Roar (3rd) - Nautical Nitwit (1st West Yorkshire Hurdle 2018)
Rule Of Law (2nd) - Exported to Japan before relocating to Ireland - Minor jumps winners
