= Golden Daffodil Stakes =

Discontinued flat horse race in Wales

- Class: Group 3
- Location: Chepstow Racecourse; Chepstow, Wales
- Inaugurated: 1994
- Final run: 8 July 2005
- Race type: Flat / Thoroughbred
- Website: Chepstow

Race information
- Distance: 1m 2f 36y (2,045 metres)
- Surface: Turf
- Track: Left-handed
- Qualification: Three-years-old and up fillies and mares excluding Group 1 winners *
- Weight: 8 st 5 lb (3yo); 9 st 2 lb (4yo+); Penalties; 7 lb for Group 2 winners * 4 lb for Group 3 winners * * since September 1 last year (2yo wins not penalised)
- Purse: £50,000 (2005); 1st: £29,000

The Golden Daffodil Stakes was a Group 3 flat horse race in Great Britain open to thoroughbred fillies and mares aged three years or older. It was run at Chepstow over a distance of 1 mile, 2 furlongs and 36 yards (2,045 metres), and it was scheduled to take place each year in July.

== History ==
The event was named after the daffodil, a national emblem of Wales. It was established in 1994 and initially held listed status.

The Golden Daffodil Stakes was promoted to Group 3 level in 2003. It was briefly the only Group race staged in Wales. It was last run in 2005.

== Records ==
Most successful horse:

- no horse won this race more than once

Leading jockey (2 wins):

- Seb Sanders – Film Script (2000), Mango Mischief (2005)

Leading trainer (2 wins):

- Luca Cumani – Papering (1996), One So Wonderful (1998)
- Henry Cecil – Fiji (1997), Sauterne (2001)

== Winners ==
Year	Winner	Age	Jockey	Trainer	Time
1994	Polka Dancer	4	Walter Swinburn	James Fanshawe	2:08.00
1995	Frustration	4	David Harrison	Lady Herries	2:06.70
1996	Papering	3	Oscar Urbina	Luca Cumani	2:04.90
1997	Fiji	3	Kieren Fallon	Henry Cecil	2:08.50
1998	One So Wonderful	4	John Reid	Luca Cumani	2:08.00
1999	Ela Athena	3	Philip Robinson	Michael Jarvis	2:04.10
2000	Film Script	3	Seb Sanders	Roger Charlton	2:07.60
2001	Sauterne	3	Richard Quinn	Henry Cecil	2:08.70
2002	Albanova	3	George Duffield	Sir Mark Prescott	2:08.00
2003	Chorist	4	Darryll Holland	William Haggas	2:12.12
2004	Felicity	4	Jimmy Fortune	John Gosden	2:09.40
2005	Mango Mischief	4	Seb Sanders	John Dunlop	2:06.17

== See also ==
- Horse racing in Great Britain
- List of British flat horse races
