= Quiff (horse) =

British-bred Thoroughbred racehorse

- Sire: Sadler's Wells
- Grandsire: Northern Dancer
- Dam: Wince
- Damsire: Selkirk
- Sex: Mare
- Foaled: 2 March 2001
- Country: United Kingdom
- Colour: Bay
- Breeder: Juddmonte Farms
- Owner: Khalid Abdulla
- Trainer: Michael Stoute
- Record: 6: 2-1-1
- Earnings: £259,351

Major wins
- Yorkshire Oaks (2004)

Awards
- World top-rated three-year-old filly (Extended distance) (2004)

Quiff (foaled 2 March 2001) is a British Thoroughbred racehorse and broodmare. Bred and owned by Khalid Abdulla and trained by Michael Stoute, she was lightly campaigned and ran only six times in three seasons. After finishing fifth on her only appearance as a two-year-old she won on her debut at three in 2004 and then appeared unlucky when beaten in the Ribblesdale Stakes. She then recorded her biggest success when winning the Group One Yorkshire Oaks by eleven lengths. On her fourth and final race as a three-year-old she was narrowly beaten in the St Leger Stakes. Her performances led to her being rated the best filly of her generation in the world over staying distances. After running poorly on her only start in 2005 she was retired from racing and has had some success as a broodmare.

== Background ==
Quiff is a bay mare with a broad white blaze bred in the United Kingdom by Juddmonte Farms, the breeding operation of her owner Khalid Abdulla. She was from the sixteenth crop of foals sired by Sadler's Wells who was Leading sire in Great Britain and Ireland on fourteen occasions. She was the first foal of her dam Wince, a top-class racemare who won the 1000 Guineas in 1999.

During her racing career, Quiff was trained by Michael Stoute at the Freemason Lodge Stables in Newmarket, Suffolk.

== Racing career ==
=== 2003: two-year-old season ===
Quiff made her first and only appearance as a juvenile on 22 August 2003 when she contested a maiden race over seven furlongs at Newmarket Racecourse. She was ridden by Richard Hughes and started the 9/4 favourite against seven opponents. She started slowly and never looked likely to win, finishing fifth behind Why Dubai.

=== 2004: three-year-old season ===
On her three-year-old debut Quiff was ridden by Brett Doyle in a ten furlong maiden at Salisbury Racecourse on 13 May and started 7/2 second favourite behind the Godolphin filly Dawn Surprise. After tracking the leaders she overtook Dawn Surprise entering the final furlong and won "comfortably" by a length, with a gap of five lengths back to the best of the other eight runners. Quiff was then moved up sharply in class for the Group Two Ribblesdale Stakes at Royal Ascot on 17 June and was ridden for the first time by Kieren Fallon. She was made favourite against eight opponents headed by Punctilious, who had finished third to Ouija Board in The Oaks. After being restrained by Fallon in the early stages, she struggled to obtain a clear run in the straight before finishing strongly to take third behind Punctilious and Sahool.

Quiff met Punctilious and Sahool again when she was moved up to Group One class for the Yorkshire Oaks on soft ground at York Racecourse on 18 August and started second choice in the betting behind the Ribblesdale winner. The other five runners were Hazarista (third in the Irish Oaks), the four-year-old Pongee, winner of her last four races, Danelissima (Noblesse Stakes), Royal Tigress (Leopardstown 1,000 Guineas Trial Stakes) and Menhoubah (Oaks d'Italia). After being held up by Fallon in the early running she began to make progress at half way and took the lead more than three furlongs from the finish. In the closing stages she drew away from her rivals to win by eleven lengths from Pongee who took second ahead of Hazarista. The BBC described her performance as "hugely impresive [sic]". After the race Stoute indicated that the filly might well take on colts in the classic St Leger, saying "She's a very progressive filly. The race didn't pan out right for her at Royal Ascot and she may have been unlucky not to win. She's just a good filly. She's on the up. I would certainly be tempted to go the Leger route".

In the St Leger over fourteen and a half furlongs at Doncaster on 11 September, Quiff was the only filly in the nine-runner field and started 3/1 joint favourite alongside the colt Rule of Law, the runner-up in The Derby. The ground was much firmer than at York, and her connections had considered withdrawing her on the eve of the race. After tracking the leaders, Fallon attempted to make a run up the inside rail but then switched to the outside approaching the last quarter mile. She finished strongly, but failed by a head to overhaul Rule of Law. in what the BBC described as a "thrilling finish". Fallon commented "She has run a terrific race. I thought we were going to get there, but there had been no pace and the winner pulled out a little bit more when we got to him. The ground didn't really suit her. It's a pity we didn't have the rain – things might have been different."

=== 2005: four-year-old season ===
Quiff remained in training as a four-year-old in 2005 and made her debut in the Gordon Richards Stakes over ten furlongs at Sandown Park Racecourse on 23 April. Ridden by Mick Kinane, she started 8/11 favourite but never recovered from a poor start and finished fourth of the eight runners behind the five-year-old gelding Weightless.

== Assessment ==
In the 2004 World Thoroughbred Racehorse Rankings Quiff was rated the third best three-year-old filly behind Ouija Board and Attraction, the best three-year-old filly over 2700 metres+ (Extended Distance) and the 57th best racehorse in the world of any age or sex. She was also nominated for the Cartier Champion Three-year-old Filly award.

== Breeding record ==
Quiff was retired from racing to become a broodmare for Juddmonte Farms at the Banstead Manor Stud in Newmarket. As of 2020 she has produced at least eight named foals, six of whom have won races:

- Coiffure, a bay filly, 2007, by King's Best. Unraced. Dam of five winners including Combe Hay, Combermere and Crack Regiment.
- Hairstyle, bay filly, 2008, by Dansili. Placed four times.
- The Great Gabrial, bay colt, 2009, by Oasis Dream. Won seven races.
- Economy, grey colt (later gelded), 2010, by Dalakhani. Won three races.
- Scallop, a bay filly, 2011, by Oasis Dream. Won two races.
- Yet Again, a bay filly, 2012, by Oasis Dream. Won one race.
- Plait, a chestnut filly, 2015, by Bated Breath. Won one race.
- Fulminate, a bay filly, 2016, by Charm Spirit. Won on her debut.
- Unnamed, a bay filly, 2019, by Starspangledbanner. Foaled in Australia.

== Pedigree ==
Pedigree of Quiff (GB), bay mare, 2001
Sire Sadler's Wells (USA) 1981	Northern Dancer (CAN); 1961	Nearctic	Nearco
Sire Sadler's Wells (USA) 1981	Northern Dancer (CAN); 1961	Nearctic	Lady Angela
Sire Sadler's Wells (USA) 1981	Northern Dancer (CAN); 1961	Natalma	Native Dancer
Sire Sadler's Wells (USA) 1981	Northern Dancer (CAN); 1961	Natalma	Almahmoud
Sire Sadler's Wells (USA) 1981	Fairy Bridge (USA); 1975	Bold Reason	Hail To Reason
Sire Sadler's Wells (USA) 1981	Fairy Bridge (USA); 1975	Bold Reason	Lalun
Sire Sadler's Wells (USA) 1981	Fairy Bridge (USA); 1975	Special	Forli
Sire Sadler's Wells (USA) 1981	Fairy Bridge (USA); 1975	Special	Thong
Dam Wince (GB) 1996	Selkirk (USA); 1988	Sharpen Up	Atan
Dam Wince (GB) 1996	Selkirk (USA); 1988	Sharpen Up	Rocchetta
Dam Wince (GB) 1996	Selkirk (USA); 1988	Annie Edge	Nebbiolo
Dam Wince (GB) 1996	Selkirk (USA); 1988	Annie Edge	Friendly Court
Dam Wince (GB) 1996	Flit (USA); 1988	Lyphard	Northern Dancer
Dam Wince (GB) 1996	Flit (USA); 1988	Lyphard	Goofed
Dam Wince (GB) 1996	Flit (USA); 1988	Nimble Folly	Cyane
Dam Wince (GB) 1996	Flit (USA); 1988	Nimble Folly	Instant Sin (Family: 4-r)

- Quiff is inbred 2 × 4 to Northern Dancer, meaning that this stallion appears in both the second and fourth generations of her pedigree.
