= Bachelor Duke =

American-bred Thoroughbred racehorse

- Sire: Miswaki
- Grandsire: Mr Prospector
- Dam: Gossamer
- Damsire: Seattle Slew
- Sex: Stallion
- Foaled: 11 March 2001
- Country: United States
- Colour: Bay
- Breeder: Airlie Stud
- Owner: Andrew Cavendish, 11th Duke of Devonshire
- Trainer: James Toller
- Record: 6: 1-0-2
- Earnings: £183,194

Major wins
- Irish 2000 Guineas (2004)

Bachelor Duke (foaled 11 March, 2001) is an American-bred, British-trained Thoroughbred racehorse and sire who recorded his only win in six races when taking the 2004 running of the Irish 2000 Guineas. He failed to win as a two-year-old in 2003 but showed very promising form by finishing third in the Somerville Tattersall Stakes and fourth in the Dewhurst Stakes. In the following spring, he finished seventh in the 2000 Guineas but then defeated a strong field to win the Irish 2000 Guineas from Azamour and Grey Swallow. He finished unplaced in the St. James's Palace Stakes on his only subsequent start and was retired from racing at the end of the season. He stood as a breeding stallion in Ireland and New Zealand and had considerable success as a sire of winners in the latter country.

== Background ==
Bachelor Duke is a bay horse with no white markings bred in Kentucky by the Irish-based Airlie Stud. As a yearling he was brought to Ireland and offered for sale at Goffs in October where he was bought for €125,000 by Blandford Bloodstock. He entered the ownership of Andrew Cavendish, 11th Duke of Devonshire and was sent into training with James Toller at Newmarket, Suffolk. He was ridden in all of his races by Seb Sanders. The Duke named the colt after his unmarried predecessor William Cavendish, 6th Duke of Devonshire who was known as "the bachelor Duke".

He was sired by Miswaki, a Florida-bred stallion who won the Prix de la Salamandre in 1980. Miswaki went on to become a very successful breeding stallion, siring many important winners including Urban Sea and Black Tie Affair. Bachelor Duke's dam Gossamer (not to be confused with the British filly of the same name) showed modest racing ability, winning two minor races from fifteen starts. She was a great-granddaughter of the American broodmare Thong, whose other descendants have included Sadler's Wells, Nureyev, Thatch and El Condor Pasa.

== Racing career ==
=== 2003: two-year-old season ===
Bachelor Duke made his racecourse debut in a maiden race over seven furlongs at Yarmouth Racecourse on 17 September and started at odds of 100/30 as the second favourite in a fifteen-runner field. After being restrained by Sanders in the early stages, he stayed on in the last quarter mile to finish third behind Eden Rock and Dubois. Despite his defeat, the colt was moved up in class for the Group Three Somerville Tattersall Stakes over the same distance at Newmarket on 2 October. He started as the 25/1 outsider of the eight runners but exceeded expectations as he finished strongly to take third place behind Milk It Mick and the favourite Bayeux, beaten half a length by the winner. He was again an outsider sixteen days later when he was stepped up to Group One level for the Dewhurst Stakes. After being held up as usual, he recovered from being blocked approaching the final furlong to finish fourth of the twelve runners behind Milk It Mick, Three Valleys, and Haafhd.

=== 2004: three-year-old season ===
Bachelor Duke began his second season in the 2000 Guineas over the Rowley Mile course at Newmarket on 1 May. Starting at odds of 20/1 in a fourteen-runner field, he raced closer to the lead than previously but was unable to quicken in the last quarter mile and came home seventh, beaten six lengths by Haafhd, who won from Snow Ridge, Azamour, and Grey Swallow. Following the death of the Duke of Devonshire on 3 May the ownership of Bachelor Duke passed to the executors of his late owner's estate.

Three weeks after his defeat at Newmarket, the colt was sent to Ireland for the Irish 2000 Guineas over one mile on good to firm ground at the Curragh. Azamour stated he was a 6/4 favourite ahead of Grey Swallow and Leitrim House (Tetrarch Stakes), with Bachelor Duke next in the betting at 12/1. The only one of the other four runners to be given a serious chance was the Aidan O'Brien-trained Grand Reward. He raced in sixth place as Grand Reward set the pace before being switched to the outside to make his challenge two furlongs out. He went to the front 100 yards from the finish and won by a length from Azamour, with Grey Swallow taking third ahead of Leitrim House. He became the first maiden to win the race since Ballymore in 1972. After recording the first classic success of his 25-year training career, James Toller said, "[It's been] a long time coming, but fantastic. It's just such a shame the owner couldn't be here to see it. It looked like he'd improved since the Guineas. He's been working well at home, and the faster ground helped". Seb Sanders, who was also winning his first classic, commented, "It's a fantastic feeling. I rode my first Group One winner (Compton Place) in the same colours, and it is a shame the Duke did not live long enough to see this day".

In the St. James's Palace Stakes at Royal Ascot in June. In the St. James's Palace Stakes at Royal Ascot in June, he was given a little more respect in the betting market and started as the 6/1 third favourite behind Azamour and Haafhd. After racing in mid-division, he was unable to make any progress in the straight and finished seventh of the eleven runners behind Azamour.

== Assessment ==
In the 2003 International Classification for two-year-olds, Bachelor Duke was given a rating of 114, making him the thirteenth-best European juvenile colt of the year, seven pounds behind the top-rated Bago. In the 2004 World Thoroughbred Racehorse Rankings, Bachelor Duke was rated at 118, making him the forty-first-best horse in the world.

== Stud career ==
Bachelor Duke retired from racing at the end of the 2004 season and began his career as a breeding stallion in 2005 at the Ballylinch Stud in Ireland. He was also shuttled to the southern hemisphere, where he was based at The Oaks Stud in New Zealand and later relocated there permanently. After a promising start, he began to suffer from poor fertility and was retired from stud duty in 2015. The stud's manager Rick Williams, commented, "It is a pity as he’s been a very good stallion. He leaves a lovely type, and when you look at his overall record, you'd have to say he’s done a big job". His best winners included:

- Shuka (2013 and 2014 Captain Cook Stakes)
- Dukedom (2016 Levin Classic)
- Spring Cheer (2013 New Zealand Cup).

== Pedigree ==
Pedigree of Bachelor Duke (USA), bay stallion 2001
Sire Miswaki (USA) 1978	Mr. Prospector (USA); 1970	Raise a Native	Native Dancer
Sire Miswaki (USA) 1978	Mr. Prospector (USA); 1970	Raise a Native	Raise You
Sire Miswaki (USA) 1978	Mr. Prospector (USA); 1970	Gold Digger	Nashua
Sire Miswaki (USA) 1978	Mr. Prospector (USA); 1970	Gold Digger	Sequence
Sire Miswaki (USA) 1978	Hopespringseternal (USA); 1971	Buckpasser	Tom Fool
Sire Miswaki (USA) 1978	Hopespringseternal (USA); 1971	Buckpasser	Busanda
Sire Miswaki (USA) 1978	Hopespringseternal (USA); 1971	Rose Bower	Princequillo
Sire Miswaki (USA) 1978	Hopespringseternal (USA); 1971	Rose Bower	Lea Lane
Dam Gossamer (USA) 1991	Seattle Slew (USA); 1974	Bold Reasoning	Boldnesian
Dam Gossamer (USA) 1991	Seattle Slew (USA); 1974	Bold Reasoning	Reason To Earn
Dam Gossamer (USA) 1991	Seattle Slew (USA); 1974	My Charmer	Poker
Dam Gossamer (USA) 1991	Seattle Slew (USA); 1974	My Charmer	Fair Charmer
Dam Gossamer (USA) 1991	Lisaleen (USA); 1982	Northern Dancer	Nearctic
Dam Gossamer (USA) 1991	Lisaleen (USA); 1982	Northern Dancer	Natalma
Dam Gossamer (USA) 1991	Lisaleen (USA); 1982	Lisadell	Forli
Dam Gossamer (USA) 1991	Lisaleen (USA); 1982	Lisadell	Thong (Family 5-h)

== See also ==
Thoroughbred racing in New Zealand
