= Hilary Needler Trophy =

Flat horse race in Britain

Hilary Needler Trophy
2026
Crystal Queen	Roots In Touche	Silesia

Previous years
2025
Argentine Tango	Meelaf	Artista
2024
Perfect Part	Maw Lam	Aviation Time
2023
Midnight Affair	Flora Of Bermuda	Tallulabelle
2022
Star Of Lady M	Primrose Ridge	Your Spirit
2021
Lady Ayresome	Guilded	Jilly Cooper

2020-2011
2019
Liberty Beach	Rose Of Kildare	Moon Of Love
2018
Kodyanna	Deia Glory	Gypsy Spirit
2017
Chica La Habana	Maggies Angel	Ce De Nullis
2016
Grizzel	Clem Fandango	Spin Doctor
2015
Easton Angel	Opal Tiara	Socialites Red
2013
Ventura Mist	Lexington Rose	Lorimer's Lot
2012
Jadanna	Blue Clumber	Threes Grand
2011
Dozy	Vocational	Lily's Angel

2010-2001
2010
Geesala	Lady Royale	Malpas Missile
2009
Don't Tell Mary	The Hermitage	Leleyf
2008
Knavesmire	Caranbola	Aspen Darlin
2007
Loch Jipp	Primo Heights	Eastern Romance
2006
Roxan	Just Joey	Hucking Hot
2005
Clare Hills	Donna Blini	Fangorn Forest
2004
Miss Meggy	Tagula Sunrise	Mary Read
2003
Attraction	Tolzey	Bella Tutrice
2002
On The Brink	Ivania	Golden Nun
2001
Good Girl	Roundtree	Coffee Time

2000-1999
2000
Freefourracing	Red Millennium	Hejaziah
1999
Tara's Girl	Vita Spericolata	Pipadash

The Hilary Needler Trophy is a conditions flat horse race in Great Britain open to fillies aged two years only. It is run at Beverley over a distance of 5 furlongs (1,006 metres), and it is scheduled to take place each year in late May or early June.

The race was awarded Listed status in 2001 but was downgraded in 2011.

The race was first run in 1965. The sponsor, Mrs Hilary Needler, died in 2012.

== Winners ==
Year	Winner	Jockey	Trainer	Time
1965	Saulisa	Russ Maddock	Pat Rohan	1:04.80
1966	Lady Jester	Lester Piggott	Pat Rohan	1:03.20
1967	No Relation	Bruce Raymond	Humphrey Cottrill	1:04.00
1968	London Star	Joe Sime	Doug Smith	1:04.00
1969	September Mist	Frankie Durr	Michael Jarvis	1:02.20
1970	Condonna	Ernie Johnson	Miss S Hall	1:04.20
1971	Statira	Eddie Hide	Bill Elsey	1:02.70
1972	Masandra	Paul Tulk	Nigel Angus	1:04.75
1973	Caught In The Rye	Willie Carson	Barry Hills	1:05.00
1974	Fretta	Eddie Hide	Mick Easterby	1:02.70
1975	Enchanted	Brian Taylor	Harry Thomson Jones	1:02.50
1976	Feudal Wytch	Bruce Raymond	Ernest Carr	1:04.20
1977	Trackalady	Chris Dwyer	Bill Haigh	1:05.40
1978	Devon Ditty	Jimmy Bleasdale	Harry Thomson Jones	1:04.90
1979	Artipiar	Tony Ives	Bill O'Gorman	1:03.60
1980	Gandoorah	Tony Ives	Bill O'Gorman	1:04.30
1981	Vaigly Star	Walter Swinburn	Michael Stoute	1:04.20
1982	Henrys Secret	Walter Swinburn	Michael Stoute	1:03.40
1983	Alghuzaylah	Paul Cook	Harry Thomson Jones	1:05.00
1984	Glory Of Hera	Philip Robinson	Clive Brittain	1:04.80
1985	Haraabah	Tony Murray	Harry Thomson Jones	1:06.60
1986	Glow Again	M Wood	Jimmy Etherington	1:03.60
1987	Only For Eve	John Lowe	Steve Norton	1:05.00
1988	Northern Line	David Nicholls	Mick Easterby	1:04.60
1989	Please Believe Me	Mark Birch	Peter Easterby	1:03.30
1990	Furajet	Mark Birch	Alex Scott	1:07.60
1991	Herora	Tony McGlone	Neil Graham	1:04.00
1992	Jervia	Bruce Raymond	Bill Watts	1:03.20
1993	Snipe Hall	Philip Robinson	John Wharton	1:04.00
1994	Fajjoura	Ray Cochrane	Gay Kelleway	1:04.20
1995	Top Cat	Dean McKeown	Ernie Weymes	1:06.80
1996	Dance Parade	Richard Quinn	Paul Cole	1:03.20
1997	Filey Brigg	Jimmy Quinn	W Kemp	1:04.20
1998	Flanders	Lindsay Charnock	Tim Easterby	1:04.90
1999	Tara's Girl	Tony Culhane	John Quinn	1:05.10
2000	Freefourracing	Pat Eddery	Brian Meehan	1:05.30
2001	Good Girl	Jamie Spencer	Tim Easterby	1:03.10
2002	On The Brink	Robert Winston	Tim Easterby	1:04.30
2003	Attraction	Keith Dalgleish	Mark Johnston	1:02.58
2004	Miss Meggy	David Allan	Tim Easterby	1:03.66
2005	Clare Hills	Darren Williams	Karl Burke	1:05.25
2006	Roxan	Neil Callan	Kevin Ryan	1:02.57
2007	Loch Jipp	Kevin Darley	J S Wainwright	1:04.75
2008	Knavesmire	Joe Fanning	Mel Brittain	1:03.58
2009	Don't Tell Mary	Richard Kingscote	Tom Dascombe	1:04.07
2010	Geesala	Jamie Spencer	Kevin Ryan	1:02.82
2011	Dozy	Jamie Spencer	Kevin Ryan	1:01.99
2012	Jadanna	Paul Mulrennan	James Given	1:02.69
2013	Ventura Mist	Duran Fentiman	Tim Easterby	1:03.05
2014	Abandoned due to waterlogging
2015	Easton Angel	Paul Mulrennan	Michael Dods	1:01.52
2016	Grizzel	Pat Dobbs	Richard Hannon Jr.	1:01.75
2017	Chica La Habana	Adam Beschizza	Robert Cowell	1:05.02
2018	Kodyanna	Paul Hanagan	Richard Fahey	1:02.76
2019	Liberty Beach	David Allan	John Quinn	1:03.08
	no race 2020 (Note: The 2020 running was cancelled because of the COVID-19 pandemic in the United Kingdom)
2021	Lady Ayresome	Kevin Stott	Kevin Ryan	1:05.16
2022	Star Of Lady M	Daniel Tudhope	David O'Meara	1:02.06
2023	Midnight Affair	Daniel Tudhope	Richard Fahey	1:01.88
2024	Perfect Part	Cam Hardie	Brian Ellison	1:04.32
2025	Argentine Tango	David Allan	Tim Easterby	1:04.21
2026	Crystal Queen	Connor Beasley	Richard & Peter Fahey	1:02.20

== See also ==
- Horse racing in Great Britain
- List of British flat horse races
