= Grey Swallow =

Irish-bred Thoroughbred racehorse

- Sire: Daylami
- Grandsire: Doyoun
- Dam: Style of Life
- Damsire: The Minstrel
- Sex: Stallion
- Foaled: 19 February 2001
- Country: Ireland
- Colour: Grey
- Breeder: Marguerite Weld
- Owner: Rochelle Quinn; Murry Rose Bloodstock; Vega FZE; Peter Rowsthorn
- Trainer: Dermot Weld; Dale Sutton
- Record: 15:6-0-2
- Earnings: £922,834

Major wins
- Killavullan Stakes (2003); Leopardstown 2,000 Guineas Trial Stakes (2004); Irish Derby (2004); Tattersalls Gold Cup (2005); Jim Murray Memorial Handicap (2006)

Grey Swallow (19 February 2001 – 25 August 2021) was an Irish Thoroughbred racehorse and sire. In a racing career which lasted from July 2003 until October 2006 he competed in five countries and won six of his fifteen races. He was unbeaten in two races as a two-year-old including the Killavullan Stakes and won the Leopardstown 2,000 Guineas Trial Stakes on his first appearance of 2004. After being placed in both the 2000 Guineas and the Irish 2,000 Guineas he recorded his most important success when defeating The Derby winner North Light in the Irish Derby. As a four-year-old he defeated a strong field to win the Tattersalls Gold Cup, but did not win again in Europe. He was campaigned internationally in 2006, winning the Jim Murray Memorial Handicap in California. At the end of his racing career he was retired to become a breeding stallion in Australia.

== Background ==
Grey Swallow was a grey horse bred in Ireland by Marguerite Weld, the mother of the trainer Dermot Weld. He is probably the best horse sired by the multiple Group One winner Daylami, from whom he inherited his colour. His dam, Style of Life won two minor races as a three-year-old in 1988, and was a sister of the Ballycorus Stakes winner Seasonal Pickup. She produced at least six other winners.

In September 2002, the yearling was consigned by the Pipers Hill Stud to the Tattersalls Houghton Sale at Newmarket and was bought for 150,000 guineas by the bloodstock agents McKeever St Lawrence. He entered the ownership of Rochelle Quinn and was sent into training with Dermot Weld at the Curragh, County Kildare.

== Racing career ==
=== 2003: two-year-old season ===
Grey Swallow made his racecourse debut in a seven-furlong maiden race at Galway Racecourse on 28 July 2003. He took the lead entering the straight and drew away from the opposition to win by ten lengths in "impressive" style. The colt was off the course for three months before starting 4/9 favourite for the Group Three Killavullan Stakes at Leopardstown Racecourse. He took the lead 1 1/2 furlongs from the finish and accelerated clear of his three rivals, winning by eight lengths.

=== 2004: three-year-old season ===
Grey Swallow's second season began on 18 April when he started the 4/9 favourite for the 2000 Guineas Trial Stakes over one mile at Leopardstown. He took the lead inside the final furlong, but was unable to pull away from his rivals, winning by a head from Meath, an Aidan O'Brien-trained colt to whom he was conceding five pounds. On his next appearance, the colt was sent overseas for the first time when he was one of fourteen runners for the British Classic 2000 Guineas over the Rowley Mile course at Newmarket. He started slowly and was never able to reach the leaders and finished fourth behind Haafhd, Snow Ridge and the John Oxx-trained Azamour. Three weeks after his run in England, Grey Swallow started second favourite behind Azamour for the Irish 2,000 Guineas at the Curragh Racecourse but the two Irish colts were beaten into third and second places respectively by the British-trained outsider Bachelor Duke.

On 27 June, Grey Swallow was moved up in distance for the Budweiser Irish Derby over 1 1/2 miles at the Curragh. The race attracted North Light, Rule of Law, Let the Lion Roar and Percussionist, the colts who had finished first, second, third and fourth in The Derby earlier in the month and Grey Swallow started the 10/1 fourth choice in a field of ten runners. The grey colt raced behind the leaders before moving up to third place behind North Light and Rule of Law with a quarter mile left to run. He overtook North Light just inside the final furlong and stayed on to defeat the English Derby winner by half a length, with the 150/1 outsider Tycoon taking third place. After the race Smullen said "I knew he had the speed to beat them if he stayed the trip and that's how I rode him. When we started to make our challenge I knew that we would be able to outspeed them. I'm more happy for him than I am for me". Dermot Weld said: "This was a very good Derby and an extra special win as he was bred by my mother, who also owns part of him".

After a break of 2 1/2 months, Grey Swallow returned for the Irish Champion Stakes over one a and a quarter miles at Leopardstown on 11 September in which he was matched for the first time against older horses. He started the 9/2 second favourite in a field which included Doyen, Rakti, Azamour and Powerscourt. He reached third place in the straight, but made no impression in the closing stages, finishing fourth of the eight runners behind Azamour. For his final appearance of the season, Grey Swallow was sent to France to contest the Prix de l'Arc de Triomphe over 2400 metres at Longchamp Racecourse, with his owners paying a supplementary fee of €60,000 as the colt had not been among the original entries. He started second favourite behind North Light, but weakened quickly in the straight and finished eighteenth of the nineteen runners behind Bago.

=== 2005: four-year-old season ===
In 2005, Grey Swallow raced in the colours of Murry Rose Bloodstock. He made his debut in the Group 1 Tattersalls Gold Cup over 10 1/2 furlongs at the Curragh on 22 May and started third choice in the betting behind Bago and Azamour. Smullen, riding on his 28th birthday, settled the grey in fourth place before moving steadily forward in the straight to take the lead 1 1/2 furlongs from the finish. In the closing stages he held off the late challenge of Bago to win by three quarters of a length, with Ace beating Azamour for third place. Dermot weld described the winner as "brave and tough as well as being talented. He did get a bit tired towards the finish but that was understandable".

After a break of two months, Grey Swallow contested Britain's most prestigious all-aged race, the King George VI and Queen Elizabeth Stakes, which was run that year at Newbury Racecourse. Starting the 100/30 second favourite, but after making a forward move with a half a mile to run, he faded in the closing stages and finished seventh of the twelve runners behind Azamour. The horse's next race was the Irish Champion Stakes in September, in which he faced a field which included Azamour, Motivator, Oratorio and Alexander Goldrun. He reached third place in the straight but was unable to maintain his challenged and finished sixth behind Oratorio, beaten almost seven lengths by the winner. On his final appearance of the year he was sent to Canada for the Pattison Canadian International Stakes at Woodbine Racecourse. He finished third behind Relaxed Gesture, but was demoted after an inquiry by the racecourse stewards found that Smullen had struck the fourth-placed finisher Electrocutionist with his whip in the straight.

=== 2006: five-year-old season ===
In the early summer of 2006, Grey Swallow was sent to North America for two races in which he was owned by Vega FZE and ridden by Alex Solis. On 13 May, carrying top weight of 121 pounds, he started 3/5 favourite for the Grade II Jim Murray Memorial Handicap at Hollywood Park Racetrack. Solis sent the horse into the lead early in the straight and he drew away to win by five lengths from Brecon Beacon. Daily Racing Form reported that his performance had "raised the bar for turf horses in America". Four weeks later, Grey Swallow started third favourite in a seven-runner field for the Grade I Manhattan Handicap at Belmont Park. He was restrained by Solis in the early stages and was still three and a lengths off the pace entering the last quarter mile. He produced a strong late run on the outside, but finished third, beaten a head and a neck by Cacique and Relaxed Gesture.

Grey Swallow was then bought by Peter Rowsthorn for a sum of between A$4m and A$6m and was sent to compete in Australia where he was trained by Dale Sutton. He made no impact on his only start for his new connections, finishing last of the twelve runners behind Fields of Omagh in the Cox Plate on 28 October.

== Assessment and honours ==
In the 2004 World Thoroughbred Racehorse Rankings, Grey Swallow was given a rating of 123, seven pounds the leader Ghostzapper, making him the ninth best racehorse in the world. In the following year, he was rated 122, making him the twentieth-best racehorse in the world, eight pounds behind the top-rated Hurricane Run. In 2006, his rating dropped to 119 and he was rated forty-fourth in the world.

== Stud record ==
Grey Swallow was retired from racing to stand as a breeding stallion in Australia, based at the Woodside Park Stud in Victoria. He died from a heart attack at Willow Hill Equestrian in Virginia on 25 August 2021, aged 20.

== Pedigree ==
Pedigree of Grey Swallow (IRE), grey stallion, 2001
Sire Daylami (IRE) 1994	Doyoun (IRE); 1985	Mill Reef	Never Bend
Sire Daylami (IRE) 1994	Doyoun (IRE); 1985	Mill Reef	Milan Mill
Sire Daylami (IRE) 1994	Doyoun (IRE); 1985	Dumka	Kashmir
Sire Daylami (IRE) 1994	Doyoun (IRE); 1985	Dumka	Faizebad
Sire Daylami (IRE) 1994	Daltawa (IRE); 1989	Miswaki	Mr. Prospector
Sire Daylami (IRE) 1994	Daltawa (IRE); 1989	Miswaki	Hopepringseternal
Sire Daylami (IRE) 1994	Daltawa (IRE); 1989	Damana	Crystal Palace
Sire Daylami (IRE) 1994	Daltawa (IRE); 1989	Damana	Denia
Dam Style of Life (USA) 1985	The Minstrel (CAN); 1974	Northern Dancer	Nearctic
Dam Style of Life (USA) 1985	The Minstrel (CAN); 1974	Northern Dancer	Natalma
Dam Style of Life (USA) 1985	The Minstrel (CAN); 1974	Fleur	Victoria Park
Dam Style of Life (USA) 1985	The Minstrel (CAN); 1974	Fleur	Flaming Page
Dam Style of Life (USA) 1985	Bubinka (USA); 1976	Nashua	Nasrullah
Dam Style of Life (USA) 1985	Bubinka (USA); 1976	Nashua	Segula
Dam Style of Life (USA) 1985	Bubinka (USA); 1976	Stolen Date	Sadair
Dam Style of Life (USA) 1985	Bubinka (USA); 1976	Stolen Date	Stolen Hour (Family: 8-f)
