= Rule of Law (horse) =

American-bred Thoroughbred racehorse

- Sire: Kingmambo
- Grandsire: Mr. Prospector
- Dam: Crystal Crossing
- Damsire: Royal Academy
- Sex: Stallion
- Foaled: 6 March 2001
- Country: United States
- Colour: Bay
- Breeder: Robert Sangster and Ben Sangster
- Owner: Sheikh Mohammed; Godolphin
- Trainer: David Loder; Saeed bin Suroor
- Record: 9: 4-2-2
- Earnings: £721,261

Major wins
- Acomb Stakes (2003); Great Voltigeur Stakes (2004); St. Leger Stakes (2004)

Awards
- Timeform rating 125

Honours
- World Champion Stayer (2004)

Rule of Law (foaled 6 March 2001), is a retired World Champion Thoroughbred racehorse and active sire who was bred in the United States but trained in Britain. In a career which lasted from June 2003 until September 2004, he ran nine times and won four races. He recorded his most important victory when winning the Classic St. Leger Stakes on his final racecourse appearance. He had previously finished second in the 2004 Epsom Derby.

== Background ==
Rule of Law, described by Timeform as a "leggy, attractive" bay horse, was bred in the United States by Robert Sangster. He is one of many notable thoroughbred racehorses sired by Kingmambo, a son of Mr. Prospector. His dam, Crystal Crossing, as a descendant of the successful racehorse and broodmare Violetta, was closely related to the Derby winner Teenoso. Before the start of his racing career, Rule of Law was acquired by Sheikh Mohammed who sent him into training with David Loder at Newmarket, Suffolk. For the 2004 season, the colt was transferred to the Godolphin Racing organisation and was trained by Saeed bin Suroor.

== Racing career ==
=== 2003: two-year-old season ===
Rule of Law ran four times as a two-year-old, ridden on each occasion by Jamie Spencer. He made his debut in a seven furlong maiden race at Sandown Park Racecourse in June, in which he finished third to Grand Rich King. A month later Rule of Law appeared in a similar event at York Racecourse and led from the start before drawing clear in the closing stages and winning by seven lengths. Rule of Law returned to York in August and was moved up in class to contest the Listed Acomb Stakes. Starting the 15/8 favourite, he led from the early stages and held the late challenge of the Aidan O'Brien-trained Celtic Cat to win by a neck. On his final start of the season, Rule of Law was again promoted in class for the Group Two Royal Lodge Stakes at Ascot in September. Spencer again attempted to make all the running, but Rule of Law was caught in the final furlong and finished third, beaten a short head and three quarters of a length by Snow Ridge and Moscow Ballet.

=== 2004: three-year-old season ===
Rule of Law began his three-year-old season in the Group Two Dante Stakes at York, an important trial race for the Epsom Derby. Starting at odds of 8/1 and ridden by Frankie Dettori he kept on well in the closing stages to finish second to North Light, beaten half a length, with Let The Lion Roar two and a half lengths back in third.

In the Epsom Derby on 5 June, Rule of Law started a 20/1 outsider, and was ridden by Kerrin McEvoy as Dettori had opted to ride Godolphin's other runner, Snow Ridge. McEvoy restrained Rule of Law at the back of the field before moving him to the outside to make his challenge in the straight. The finish proved to be a repeat of the Dante, with North Light winning by a length and a half from Rule of Law and Let the Lion Roar. In the Irish Derby at The Curragh three weeks later, Rule of Law took the lead in the straight but was outpaced in the closing stages and finished fourth behind Grey Swallow, North Light and Tycoon. In August, Rule of Law was sent to York for the Great Voltigeur Stakes, a major trial race for the St Leger. Ridden by Dettori, he "dominated" the race from the start and quickened clear in the straight to win by two and a half lengths from Let the Lion Roar.

In the St Leger at Doncaster on 11 September, Rule of Law started 3/1 joint favourite alongside the Michael Stoute-trained filly Quiff, the winner of the Yorkshire Oaks. He was the Godolphin team's sole representative and had been strongly fancied after working impressively in training. McEvoy sent Rule of Law into the lead from the start and set a moderate pace before sending him into a clear lead in the straight. In the closing stages he was strongly challenged by Quiff, but ran on "gamely" to win by a head in what the BBC described as a "thrilling finish".

Rule of Law was sent to Dubai for the winter of 2004/5, where he sustained a foot injury. He stayed in training for a further two seasons, but never ran again, owing to his inability to recover fully from his injury problems.

== Assessment and honours ==
Rule of Law was rated the best racehorse in the world over extended distances in 2004 when he was given a rating of 120 in the World Thoroughbred Racehorse Rankings.

== Stud career ==
Rule of Law was retired to stand at his owner's Darley Stud. He has been based in Japan before moving in 2011 to the Kedorah House Stud in County Tipperary, Ireland. To date, he has had little success as a sire of winners.

== Pedigree ==
Pedigree of Rule of Law, bay stallion (2001)
Sire Kingmambo	Mr. Prospector	Raise a Native	Native Dancer
Sire Kingmambo	Mr. Prospector	Raise a Native	Raise You
Sire Kingmambo	Mr. Prospector	Gold Digger	Nashua
Sire Kingmambo	Mr. Prospector	Gold Digger	Sequence
Sire Kingmambo	Miesque	Nureyev	Northern Dancer*
Sire Kingmambo	Miesque	Nureyev	Special
Sire Kingmambo	Miesque	Pasodoble	Prove Out
Sire Kingmambo	Miesque	Pasodoble	Santa Quilla
Dam Crystal Crossing	Royal Academy	Nijinsky	Northern Dancer*
Dam Crystal Crossing	Royal Academy	Nijinsky	Flaming Page
Dam Crystal Crossing	Royal Academy	Crimson Saint	Crimson Satan
Dam Crystal Crossing	Royal Academy	Crimson Saint	Bolero Rose
Dam Crystal Crossing	Never So Fair	Never So Bold	Bold Lad (IRE)
Dam Crystal Crossing	Never So Fair	Never So Bold	Never Never Land
Dam Crystal Crossing	Never So Fair	Favoletta	Baldric
Dam Crystal Crossing	Never So Fair	Favoletta	Violetta (Family 3-c)

- Rule of Law is inbred 4 × 4 to Northern Dancer, meaning that this stallion appears twice in the fourth generation of his pedigree.
