= Denford Stakes =

Flat horse race in Britain

- Class: Listed
- Location: Newbury Racecourse; Newbury, England
- Race type: Flat / Thoroughbred
- Sponsor: Denford Stud
- Website: Newbury

Race information
- Distance: 7f (1,408 metres)
- Surface: Turf
- Track: Straight
- Qualification: Two-year-olds (excluding Group winners) sired by winner at 1 mile 1½ furlongs+ (1,900m+)
- Weight: 9 st 1 lb Allowances; 5 lb for fillies Penalties; 3 lb for Listed winners
- Purse: £45,000 (2022); 1st: £25,520

Denford Stud Stakes
2022
Victory Dance	Ferrari Queen	Candle Of Hope

Previous years
2021
Masekela	Bayside Boy	Robjon

2020-2011
2020
Saint Lawrence	Dhahabi	Francesco Guardi
2019
Thunderous	Sesame Birah	Sun Power
2018
Boitron	Dutch Treat	Good Fortune
2017
Hey Gaman	Red Mist	Another Batt
2016
Escobar	Mr Scaramanga	Amabilis
2015
Epsom Icon	Dessertoflife	Palawan
2014
Belardo	Hawkesbury	Diaz
2013
Somewhat	Be Ready	Speedy Approach
2012
Just The Judge	Excess Knowledge	Ninjago
2011
Fencing	Telwaar	Leqqaa

2010-2001
2010
Janood	Slim Shadey	Sensei
2009
Azmeel	Practitioner	Blakey's Boy
2008
Cry Of Freedom	Mustaqer	Jazz Police
2007
Sharp Nephew	Latin Lad	Scintillo
2006
Dubai's Touch	Valiance	Celtic Sultan
2005
Innocent Air	Galileo's Star	Romantic Evening
2004
Kings Quay	Wilko	Subyan Dreams
2003
Haafhd	Orcadian	Milk It Mick
2002
Muqbil	Pinkerton	La Mouline
2001
Funfair Wane	Mamool	In Space

2000-1991
2000
Prizeman	Perfect Sunday	Lucayan Chief
1999
Mana-Mou Bay	Tioga	Millenary
1998
Valentine Girl	Claxon	Truant
1997
Bahr	Quiet Assurance	Fruits Of Love
1996
State Fair	In Question	Davoski
1995
Mons	Yarob	Line Dancer
1994
Lammtarra	Myself	Petoskin
1993
Colonel Collins	Thabit	Village Eagle
1992
Tenby	Right Win	Civil Law
1991
Rodrigo De Triano	Anchorite	Assessor

1990-1988
1990
Heart Of Darkness	Caerdydd	Prodigal Blues
1989
Karinga Bay	Marquetry	Shambo
1988
Zalazl	Akid	Polar Region

The Denford Stakes is a Listed flat horse race in Great Britain open to two-year-old horses. It is run at Newbury over a distance of 7 furlongs (1,408 metres), and it is scheduled to take place each year in August.

== History ==
The event was originally named after Washington Singer (1866–1934), a prominent racehorse owner and philanthropist and was initially run over a distance of 6 furlongs, before being extended by one furlong in 1983. It has been won by several subsequent Classic winners, including Rodrigo de Triano, Lammtarra and Haafhd.

The race is currently restricted to horses which have not won at Group level, and whose sires achieved victory at distances in excess of 1 mile and 1½ furlongs, or 1,900 metres.

Sponsors of the Washington Singer Stakes have included Usk Valley Stud, Matalan and Denford Stud, and in recent years it has been run under various sponsored titles. The race title formally changed to the Denford Stakes from the 2017 running.

== Records ==
Leading jockey (7 wins):

- Lester Piggott – Astrador (1959), Mereworth (1961), Peter Le Grand (1963), Ribocco (1966), Medina Boy (1969), Custer (1981), Trojen Fen (1983)

Leading trainer (6 wins):

- Henry Cecil - R B Chesne (1978), Custer (1981), Trojan Fen (1983), Faustus (1985), Zalazl (1988), Tenby (1992)

== Winners ==
Year	Winner	Jockey	Trainer	Time
1957	Pleiades	Snowy Fawdon	Bernard van Cutsem	1:16.60
1958	Dear Gazelle	Harry Carr	Derrick Candy	1:17.40
1959	Astrador	Lester Piggott	Noel Murless	1:17.00
1960	History Don	Bill Elliott	David Hastings	1:15.40
1961	Mereworth	Lester Piggott	Noel Murless	1:15.40
1962	Queen's Hussar	Scobie Breasley	Atty Corbett	1:15.80
1963	Peter Le Grand	Lester Piggott	Noel Murless	1:16.80
1964	Air Patrol	Bill Elliott	Derrick Candy	1:13.00
1965	Selvedge	Lionel Brown	Peter Easterby	1:16.40
1966	Ribocco	Lester Piggott	Fulke Johnson Houghton	1:19.00
1967	Attalus	George Moore	Noel Murless	1:19.60
1968	White Fang	Ron Hutchinson	John Dunlop	1:19.40
1969	Medina Boy	Lester Piggott	Staff Ingham	1:17.80
1970	Brigadier Gerard	Joe Mercer	Dick Hern	1:15.32
1971	Yaroslav	Geoff Lewis	Noel Murless	1:17.42
1972	Fair Tactics	Jimmy Lindley	G Peter-Hoblyn	1:15.65
1973	Glen Strae	Tony Murray	Ryan Price	1:15.55
1974	Berfeit	Robert Edmondson	Dave Hanley	1:20.00
1975	Homeboy	Frankie Durr	Ian Balding	1:17.46
1976	Fife And Drum	Joe Mercer	Dick Hern	1:15.14
1977	Derrylin	Eric Eldin	Doug Smith	1:13.59
1978	R B Chesne	Joe Mercer	Henry Cecil	1:17.06
1979	Swift Arrest	Bob Weaver	Toby Balding	1:16.92
1980	Poldhu	Bruce Raymond	Michael Jarvis	1:17.86
1981	Custer	Lester Piggott	Henry Cecil	1:14.79
1982	Horage	Tony Murray	Mattie McCormack	1:14.61
1983	Trojan Fen	Lester Piggott	Henry Cecil	1:27.24
1984	Khozaam	Joe Mercer	Peter Walwyn	1:29.01
1985	Faustus	Steve Cauthen	Henry Cecil	1:33.94
1986	Deputy Governor	Tony Ives	Lester Piggott	1:28.13
1987	Emmson	Willie Carson	Dick Hern	1:29.43
1988	Zalazl (Note: Prince of Dance finished first in 1988, but he was subsequently disqualified for being an ineligible runner)	Steve Cauthen	Henry Cecil	1:30.29
1989	Karinga Bay	Brian Rouse	Denys Smith	1:30.57
1990	Heart of Darkness	Steve Cauthen	Ian Balding	1:30.41
1991	Rodrigo de Triano	Paul Eddery	Peter Chapple-Hyam	1:26.59
1992	Tenby	Pat Eddery	Henry Cecil	1:28.59
1993	Colonel Collins	Pat Eddery	Peter Chapple-Hyam	1:26.01
1994	Lammtarra	Walter Swinburn	Alex Scott	1:28.26
1995	Mons	Jason Weaver	Luca Cumani	1:26.87
1996	State Fair	Michael Hills	Barry Hills	1:27.74
1997	Bahr	Michael Hills	Barry Hills	1:24.81
1998	Valentine Girl	Richard Hills	Barry Hills	1:28.97
1999	Mana-Mou Bay	Richard Hughes	Richard Hannon Sr.	1:27.22
2000	Prizeman	Richard Hughes	Richard Hannon Sr.	1:24.94
2001	Funfair Wane	Steve Drowne	Mick Channon	1:25.50
2002	Muqbil	Richard Hills	John Dunlop	1:26.61
2003	Haafhd	Richard Hills	Barry Hills	1:23.04
2004	Kings Quay	Ryan Moore	Richard Hannon Sr.	1:28.46
2005	Innocent Air	Richard Hughes	John Gosden	1:25.47
2006	Dubai's Touch	Joe Fanning	Mark Johnston	1:28.34
2007	Sharp Nephew	Frankie Dettori	Brian Meehan	1:26.53
2008	Cry of Freedom	Frankie Dettori	Mark Johnston	1:27.67
2009	Azmeel	Ryan Moore	John Gosden	1:25.90
2010	Janood	Frankie Dettori	Saeed bin Suroor	1:28.82
2011	Fencing	William Buick	John Gosden	1:26.44
2012	Just The Judge	Michael Hills	Charles Hills	1:26.23
2013	Somewhat	Gérald Mossé	Mark Johnston	1:25.57
2014	Belardo	Andrea Atzeni	Roger Varian	1:28.47
2015	Epsom Icon	Graham Lee	Mick Channon	1:30.68
2016	Escobar	Frankie Dettori	Hugo Palmer	1:26.17
2017	Hey Gaman	Martin Harley	James Tate	1:28.79
2018	Boitron	Silvestre de Sousa	Richard Hannon Jr.	1:26.19
2019	Thunderous	Franny Norton	Mark Johnston	1:30.07
2020	Saint Lawrence	Andrea Atzeni	Roger Varian	1:27.36
2021	Masekela	William Buick	Andrew Balding	1:26.57
2022	Victory Dance	William Buick	Charlie Appleby	1:25.27

== See also ==
- Horse racing in Great Britain
- List of British flat horse races
