= Azamour =

Irish-bred Thoroughbred racehorse

- Sire: Night Shift
- Grandsire: Northern Dancer
- Dam: Asmara
- Damsire: Lear Fan
- Sex: Stallion
- Foaled: 2001
- Country: Ireland
- Colour: Bay
- Breeder: HH Aga Khan
- Owner: HH Aga Khan
- Trainer: John Oxx
- Record: 12: 6–1–3
- Earnings: £1,499,558

Major wins
- Beresford Stakes (2003); St. James's Palace Stakes (2004); Irish Champion Stakes (2004); Prince of Wales's Stakes (2005); George VI and Queen Elizabeth Stakes (2005)

Awards
- European Champion Older Horse (2005); BHB Champion Older Male (2005); BHB Champion Middle-Distance Horse (2005)

Azamour (8 March 2001 – 5 April 2014) was a Thoroughbred racehorse and sire. He won four Group One races including the King George VI and Queen Elizabeth Stakes and was Europe's Champion Older Horse in 2005. At his peak, he was rated the third best thoroughbred racehorse in the world.

== Background ==
Azamour was a "powerful" bay horse standing 16.2 hands high. He was bred in Ireland and raced by the Aga Khan. His sire, Night Shift, was a son Northern Dancer who is regarded as the 20th century's best sire of sires, while his dam was Asmara, a daughter of Lear Fan, a Group One winning son of Roberto.

Apart from Azamour, Night Shift sired many good racehorses in a long stud career, including In the Groove, Well Chief, Lochangel, Barons Pit (Diadem Stakes) and Nicolotte (Queen Anne Stakes). Azamour's dam Asmara won the Listed Trigo Stakes in 1996 and was a half-sister of the Prix Ganay winner Astarabad. Apart from Azamour, her best foal has been Arazan, who won the Group Two Futurity Stakes in 2008.

Azamour was trained throughout his career by John Oxx at his base near the Curragh, and ridden in nine of his twelve races by Michael Kinane.

== Racing career ==
=== 2003: two-year-old season ===
Azamour made two starts at age two, both at the Curragh. He made his debut in a race for maidens on 14 September 2003, ridden by Johnny Murtagh. Starting at 7/4 he led three furlongs from the finish and won "easily" by two and a half lengths.

He was stepped up in class and distance four weeks later, when he contested the Group Two Beresford Stakes over a mile on soft (officially "yielding") ground. Azamour was made 6/4 favourite in a field which included runners from the leading stables of Aidan O'Brien, Jim Bolger and Dermot Weld. Murtagh tracked the leader Relaxed Gesture throughout the race and Azamour stayed on under pressure in the straight to take the lead inside the last furlong and win by a neck.

Relaxed Gesture was highly regarded by Dermot Weld, and Azamour was identified by some observers as a colt who could go on to better things in 2004.

=== 2004: three-year-old season ===
After missing an intended run in the Leopardstown 2,000 Guineas Trial, Azamour began his three-year-old season by going directly to the Group One 2000 Guineas at Newmarket. He was largely ignored in the betting and started at 25/1, but exceeded expectations, staying on strongly up the centre of the straight mile course and finishing third, beaten just under three lengths, behind Haafhd and Snow Ridge.

As a result of his performance at Newmarket, Azamour was made 6/4 favourite for the Irish 2000 Guineas at the Curragh Racecourse three weeks later. Kinane had Azamour just behind the leaders for most of the race before moving into the lead a furlong from the finish, but was caught in the closing stages and beaten a neck by the English-trained Bachelor Duke.

Azamour was then sent back to England for the Royal Ascot meeting, where he faced a strong field, including Haafhd and Bachelor Duke in the St. James's Palace Stakes. Azamour produced his best performance to date, taking the lead in the straight and running on strongly under pressure to hold off the French-trained Diamond Green by a neck. The performance established Azamour as one of the best milers in Europe, but Oxx suggested that the colt's future lay over longer distances.

Oxx withdrew Azamour from the International Stakes at York after being concerned that his horse would be unsuited by the soft ground. He had therefore been off the course for almost three months before he ran again, this time against older horses, in the Irish Champion Stakes. Kinane held the colt up in last place before making his challenge in the straight. Azamour produced a powerful, sustained run (described by RTÉ as a "blistering flourish") to move past the entire field, catching Norse Dancer in the last strides and winning by half a length. The beaten horses included the Group One winners Powerscourt, Grey Swallow, Rakti and the odds-on favourite Doyen.

On his final start of the season, Azamour returned to Newmarket's Rowley Mile course for the Champion Stakes. He was again held up, before making headway in the closing stages, but could never reach the lead, and finished third of the eleven runners, beaten three and a half lengths by Haafhd. Oxx was not particularly disappointed, explaining that the colt was unsuited by the soft ground. Oxx also stated that, unlike most of the Aga Khan's horses, Azamour would stay in training as a four-year-old and nominated the Tattersalls Gold Cup, Prince of Wales's Stakes and King George VI and Queen Elizabeth Stakes as his targets.

=== 2005: four-year-old season ===
As predicted, Azamour began his season in a strong renewal of the Tattersalls Gold Cup in which he took fourth place behind Grey Swallow, Bago and Ace. He was unable to find a clear run after Bago drifted across in the closing stages, and Kinane felt that he had been an unlucky loser.

Azamour was then sent to Royal "Ascot". Because of redevelopments at Ascot Racecourse, all the course's fixtures were moved in 2005, with the Royal meeting taking place at York. Azamour was made 11/8 favourite for the Prince of Wales's Stakes, and justified his position by leading a furlong from the finish and beating Ace by one and a half lengths, with Elvstroem, Warrsan and Ouija Board among the also-rans.

The King George VI and Queen Elizabeth Stakes, often regarded as Britain's most prestigious weight-for-age race was run at Newbury in 2003. Azamour was made 5/2 favourite in a field which included Bago, Grey Swallow, Doyen and several other major winners, although the absence of top-class three-year-olds was noticeable. Kinane held the colt up in last place before making "smooth" progress in the straight to take the lead inside the last quarter of a mile. He ran on strongly in the closing stages to record what one commentator called an "insultingly easy" win by one and a quarter lengths from Norse Dancer, with Bago third. In winning the race, Azamour broke the course record, which had stood for more than fifty years. Oxx described his colt as being "in a different league."

Azamour was made 6/4 favourite in his attempt to win a second Irish Champion Stakes in September, despite the presence of the Derby winner Motivator. As Kinane had been injured in a fall at the Curragh, Azamour was ridden by Christophe Soumillon. Oxx expressed some concern about the situation, pointing out that Kinane had "a real rapport" with the horse. Azamour failed to reproduce his best form, and finished fifth of the ten runners behind Oratorio. Azamour slipped on the turn into the straight at Leopardstown sustaining a muscle injury, and was then forced to miss an intended run in the Prix de l'Arc de Triomphe after suffering from a hoof abscess.

Azamour's final race was a challenge for the Breeders' Cup Turf at Belmont Park. He was held up as usual, but when Kinane attempted to make his move he was unable to find a space, and was forced to drop back and switch to the outside. Azamour made rapid progress in the closing stages, but his effort was too late, and he finished third behind Shirocco and Ace.

Azamour's retirement was announced shortly afterwards. Oxx paid tribute to the horse, calling him "phenomenal" and emphasising his toughness and ability to win over a range of distances.

== Race record ==
Date	Race	Dist (f)	Course	Class	Prize (£K)	Odds	Runners	Placing	Margin	Time	Jockey	Trainer
14 September 2003	Pizza Stop EBF Maiden	7	The Curragh	M	8	7/4	9	1	2.5	1:25.40	Johnny Murtagh	John Oxx
12 October 2003	Beresford Stakes	8	The Curragh	2	54	6/4	6	1	Neck	1:42.00	Johnny Murtagh	John Oxx
1 May 2004	2000 Guineas	8	Newmarket Rowley	1	174	25/1	14	3	2.75	1:36.64	Michael Kinane	John Oxx
22 May 2004	Irish 2,000 Guineas	8	The Curragh	1	164	6/4	14	2	1	1:40.00	Michael Kinane	John Oxx
15 June 2004	St. James's Palace Stakes	8	Ascot	1	139	9/2	11	1	Neck	1:39.02	Michael Kinane	John Oxx
11 September 2004	Irish Champion Stakes	10	Leopardstown	1	407	8/1	8	1	0.5	2:01.90	Michael Kinane	John Oxx
16 October 2004	Champion Stakes	10	Newmarket Rowley	1	215	6/1	11	3	3.5	2:06.90	Michael Kinane	John Oxx
22 May 2005	Tattersalls Gold Cup	10.5	The Curragh	1	109	4/1	6	4	2	2.15.10	Michael Kinane	John Oxx
15 June 2005	Prince of Wales's Stakes	10	Newmarket York	1	203	11/8	8	1	1.5	2:08.15	Michael Kinane	John Oxx
23 July 2005	King George VI and Queen Elizabeth Stakes	12	Newbury	1	408	5/2	12	1	1.25	2:28.26	Michael Kinane	John Oxx
10 September 2005	Irish Champion Stakes	10	Leopardstown	1	396	6/4	10	5	2.25	2:03.90	Christophe Soumillon	John Oxx
29 October 2005	Breeders' Cup Turf	12	Belmont Park	1	617	100/30	13	3	2	2:29.30	Michael Kinane	John Oxx

.

== Assessment ==
In the 2004 World Thoroughbred Racehorse Rankings Azamour was rated at 123, making him the ninth best horse in the world.

In the 2005 World Thoroughbred Racehorse Rankings Azamour was rated at 126, making him the third best horse in the world, behind Hurricane Run and Ghostzapper.

His 2005 performances earned Azamour the title of European Champion Older Horse at the Cartier Racing Awards.

Azamour was also named Champion middle-distance horse and Champion older horse by the British Horseracing Board.

Several years after Azamour's retirement, John Oxx pointed out the colt's similarities to Sea the Stars, explaining that both horses had dominant temperaments- they were natural "herd leaders."

== Stud career ==
Retired to stud for the 2006 season, Azamour stood at his owners Gilltown Stud near Kilcullen, Ireland. His stud fee for 2012 was €15,000.

Azamour had success as a sire with his best offspring including Covert Love, winner of the Irish Oaks and Prix de l'Opéra in 2015. Other offspring include: Valyra, winner of the 2012 Prix de Diane, Native Khan (Craven Stakes), Eleanora Duse (Blandford Stakes), Best of Days (Cantala Stakes, Royal Lodge Stakes), Hawksmoor (German 1,000 Guineas), Azmeel (Dee Stakes), Puncher Clynch (Ballysax Stakes), Liber Nauticus (Musidora Stakes), Aloisia (The Thousand Guineas), Best of Days (Cantala Stakes) and No Explaining (Gallorette Handicap) as well as the leading hurdler Zarkandar.

On 5 April 2014 Azamour was euthanised. The Aga Khan Studs tweeted "We are sad to announce that the stallion, Azamour, was put down after sustaining a serious injury in his box this morning. Despite the best efforts of both vets and attending staff, the four time Group 1 winner had to be euthanised on humane grounds today".

== Pedigree ==
Pedigree of Azamour (IRE), bay stallion, 2001
Sire Night Shift (USA) 1980	Northern Dancer; 1961	Nearctic	Nearco
Sire Night Shift (USA) 1980	Northern Dancer; 1961	Nearctic	Lady Angela
Sire Night Shift (USA) 1980	Northern Dancer; 1961	Natalma	Native Dancer
Sire Night Shift (USA) 1980	Northern Dancer; 1961	Natalma	Almahmoud
Sire Night Shift (USA) 1980	Ciboulette; 1961	Chip Chop	Flares
Sire Night Shift (USA) 1980	Ciboulette; 1961	Chip Chop	Sceptical
Sire Night Shift (USA) 1980	Ciboulette; 1961	Windy Answer	Windfields
Sire Night Shift (USA) 1980	Ciboulette; 1961	Windy Answer	Reply
Dam Asmara (USA) 1993	Lear Fan; 1981	Roberto	Hail To Reason
Dam Asmara (USA) 1993	Lear Fan; 1981	Roberto	Bramalea
Dam Asmara (USA) 1993	Lear Fan; 1981	Wac	Lt. Stevens
Dam Asmara (USA) 1993	Lear Fan; 1981	Wac	Belthazar
Dam Asmara (USA) 1993	Anaza; 1986	Darshaan	Shirley Heights
Dam Asmara (USA) 1993	Anaza; 1986	Darshaan	Delsy
Dam Asmara (USA) 1993	Anaza; 1986	Azaarika	Ribero
Dam Asmara (USA) 1993	Anaza; 1986	Azaarika	Arcana (Family: 4-i)
