= North Light =

Irish-bred Thoroughbred racehorse

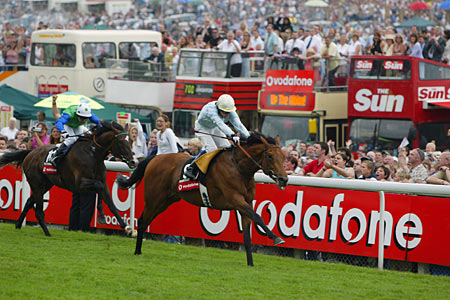
- Breed: Thoroughbred
- Sire: Danehill (USA)
- Grandsire: Danzig (USA)
- Dam: Sought Out (IRE)
- Damsire: Rainbow Quest (USA)
- Sex: Stallion
- Foaled: 2001
- Country: Ireland
- Colour: Bay
- Breeder: Ballymacoll Stud
- Owner: Ballymacoll Stud
- Trainer: Sir Michael Stoute
- Record: 7: 3-3-0
- Earnings: £1,097,276

Major wins
- Dante Stakes (2004); Epsom Derby (2004)

North Light (1 March 2001 – 20 March 2024) was Thoroughbred racehorse, and sire, bred in Ireland but trained in the United Kingdom. He was best known as the winner of The Derby in 2004.

== Background ==
North Light was bred in Ireland by Lord Weinstock's Ballymacoll Stud. On Lord Weinstock's death in 2002, his thoroughbreds, including the yearling North Light, passed to the executors of his estate. In 2004 the ownership of North Light was officially transferred to the Ballymacoll Stud.

North Light's sire Danehill is one of the most successful stallions of the last twenty years, producing the winners of more than 1,000 races including 156 at Group One/Grade I level. Among his best offspring are Dylan Thomas, Rock of Gibraltar, Danehill Dancer, Fastnet Rock, George Washington and Duke of Marmalade. North Light's dam, Sought Out was a successful racemare who won the Group One Prix du Cadran and traces back to Country House the dam of Reform. Apart from North Light, she has produced the Jockey Club Cup winner Cover Up, and the Glorious Stakes winner Researched.

North Light was trained throughout his career by Michael Stoute at Newmarket, Suffolk and was ridden in all but one of his races by Kieren Fallon.

== Racing career ==
=== 2003: two-year-old career ===
North Light began his career in August 2003, in a maiden race at Sandown in which he finished strongly, failing by a short head to catch Post And Rail. Despite the closeness of the finish, Fallon did not use the whip on North Light, clearly suggesting that he could be capable of better. The standard of the race was unusually high; the third-place finisher, Iffraaj, went on to win three Group races, while the fourth placed Maraahel won eight.

When North Light appeared in another maiden race at Goodwood a month later, he started at odds of 1/5, and went clear in the final furlong to win "readily" from the future Group race winner Take A Bow. Although North Light was entered in the Group One Racing Post Trophy he did not run again in 2003.

=== 2004: three-year-old career ===
North Light's three-year-old season began with a significant step up in class as he was sent to York for the Group Two Dante Stakes, a recognised trial for the Derby. He was the fourth choice of the ten runners in the betting, starting at odds of 6/1. North Light was sent into the lead by Fallon half a mile from home, and he stayed on strongly up the straight to win by half a length from Rule of Law with the favourite Let The Lion Roar two and a half lengths further back in third. North Light was travelling so well that Fallon began to ease the colt down and stopped riding only to start again when he noticed Frankie Dettori closing fast on Rule of Law. Although he had won an important trial, Stoute was careful not to sound overconfident after the race, describing the performance as "solid" and calling North Light an "each-way" chance for the Derby.

The Ballymacoll colours, carried by North Light

Following the late withdrawal of the Aidan O'Brien-trained Yeats, North Light was made 7/2 joint-favourite for the Derby with the 2000 Guineas runner-up Snow Ridge. Like North Light, Snow Ridge had been bred by the Ballymacoll stud but had been sold to Godolphin at the end of his two-year-old season. In fact the two colts had been born in the same stall, just over a month apart.

In the race, Fallon's plan was to make the most of North Light's stamina. He sent the colt into the lead as the field entered the straight, and quickly went two lengths clear. From that point on he was never in real danger, staying on strongly throughout the closing stages and winning comfortably. In a repeat of the Dante result, Rule of Law and Let The Lion Roar took second and third places. The winning time of 2:33.72 was the fourth fastest recorded for a Derby at Epsom. After the race, Stoute expresses his satisfaction with the performance, pointing out that it was only North Light's fourth race, and indicated that he would be aimed at the Irish Derby.

North Light was made odds on favourite for the Irish Derby at The Curragh three weeks later. He took the lead from Rule of Law two furlongs out but was challenged by the Dermot Weld-trained Grey Swallow. Although North Light ran on well the Irish colt took the lead a furlong out and won by half a length. North Light came back from the race with a leg injury which forced him to miss his planned run in the King George VI and Queen Elizabeth Stakes.

There were reports that North Light would run in the St Leger, but in August it was announced that he would instead be trained for the Prix de l'Arc de Triomphe In September the bookmakers, Coral reported heavy betting support for North Light and cut his price for the Paris race from 8/1 to 5/1.

Despite having been off the racecourse for more than three months, North Light started 9/2 favourite for the Prix de l'Arc de Triomphe just preferred to Grey Swallow on 5/1. North Light started quickly and disputed the lead for most of the race with Tap Dance City until the Japanese horse faded in the straight. A furlong and a half from the finish North Light lost the lead to Cherry Mix and although he ran on under pressure, he finished fifth of the nineteen runners behind Bago, beaten three and a half lengths.

Fallon was pleased with North Light's effort, saying, "he kept changing his legs and didn't like the ground, but he ran a great race all the same." Stoute felt that the ground conditions had not suited his colt, but expressed his hopes that North Light would stay in training.

=== 2005: four-year-old career ===
North Light did stay in training at four, and was expected to make his debut in the Group One Tattersalls Gold Cup at the Curragh, where he would have been matched against Bago and Grey Swallow. Instead, his connections switched him to the less competitive Brigadier Gerard Stakes, a Group Three race at Sandown. As a Group One winner, North Light was asked to carry 129 lbs, giving between two and ten pounds to the other four runners. For once, North Light, ridden by Johnny Murtagh, was unable to reach the lead and appeared to be struggling some way from the finish. He finished strongly, but was unable to catch the filly New Morning and was beaten by half a length. Stoute described North Light as "a bit rusty" but said that he was pleased with the colt's performance.

Shortly after his race at Sandown, it was announced that North Light had suffered a pelvic injury ("a stress fracture to the right ilial wing"), and would be unable to race again.

== Race record ==
Date	Race	Dist (f)	Course	Class	Prize (£K)	Odds	Runners	Placing	Margin	Time	Jockey	Trainer
29 August 2003	Pacemaker EBF Maiden Stakes	7	Sandown	M	6	5/1	14	2	Short head	1:34.75	Kieren Fallon	Michael Stoute
24 September 2003	Uniq Foodservice EBF Maiden Stakes	8	Goodwood	M	2	1/5	5	1	1.75	1:40.85	Kieren Fallon	Michael Stoute
12 May 2004	Dante Stakes	10.5	York	2	84	6/1	10	1	0.5	2:15.69	Kieren Fallon	Michael Stoute
5 June 2004	Derby	12	Epsom	1	788	7/2	14	1	1.5	2:33.72	Kieren Fallon	Michael Stoute
27 June 2004	Irish Derby	12	The Curragh	1	518	8/11	10	2	0.5	2:28.70	Kieren Fallon	Michael Stoute
3 October 2004	Prix de l'Arc de Triomphe	12	Longchamp	1	743	9/2	19	5	3.5	2:25.00	Kieren Fallon	Michael Stoute
31 May 2005	Brigadier Gerard Stakes	10	Sandown	3	29	10/11	5	2	0.5	2:08.01	Johnny Murtagh	Michael Stoute

.

== Assessment ==
In the 2004 World Thoroughbred Racehorse Rankings, North Light was assigned a figure of 122, making him the fifteenth best horse in the world.

In the 2005 World Thoroughbred Racehorse Rankings, he was rated on 117, on the basis of his one racecourse appearance.

== Stud career ==
North Light was retired to stallion duty at Frank Stronach's Adena Springs stud in Paris, Kentucky.

In September 2010 his son Arctic Cosmos (from his first crop of foals) won the St Leger Stakes.

In October 2010, it was announced that North Light would be moved from Kentucky to Adena Springs' Canadian base in Ontario for the 2011 breeding season. In 2013 he arrived at the Lanwades Stud in Newmarket, England and spent the 2014 season at the stud but it was reported that he covered only 13 mares, 3 of them belonging to the stud's owner Kirsten Rausing.

North Light was euthanized due to complications caused by laminitis on 20 March 2024.

== Pedigree ==
Pedigree of North Light (IRE), bay stallion, 2001
Sire Danehill (USA) 1986	Danzig; 1977	Northern Dancer	Nearctic
Sire Danehill (USA) 1986	Danzig; 1977	Northern Dancer	Natalma*
Sire Danehill (USA) 1986	Danzig; 1977	Pas de Nom	Admiral's Voyage
Sire Danehill (USA) 1986	Danzig; 1977	Pas de Nom	Petitioner
Sire Danehill (USA) 1986	Rayzana; 1981	His Majesty	Ribot
Sire Danehill (USA) 1986	Rayzana; 1981	His Majesty	Flower Bowl
Sire Danehill (USA) 1986	Rayzana; 1981	Spring Adieu	Buckpasser
Sire Danehill (USA) 1986	Rayzana; 1981	Spring Adieu	Natalma*
Dam Sought Out (IRE) 1988	Rainbow Quest; 1981	Blushing Groom	Red God
Dam Sought Out (IRE) 1988	Rainbow Quest; 1981	Blushing Groom	Runaway Bride
Dam Sought Out (IRE) 1988	Rainbow Quest; 1981	I Will Follow	Herbager
Dam Sought Out (IRE) 1988	Rainbow Quest; 1981	I Will Follow	Where You Lead
Dam Sought Out (IRE) 1988	Edinburgh; 1974	Charlottown	Charlottesville
Dam Sought Out (IRE) 1988	Edinburgh; 1974	Charlottown	Meld
Dam Sought Out (IRE) 1988	Edinburgh; 1974	Queen's Castle	Sovereign Path
Dam Sought Out (IRE) 1988	Edinburgh; 1974	Queen's Castle	Country House (Family: 5-h)

- Like all of Danehill's offspring North Light is inbred 4 × 4 to the mare Natalma. This means that she occurs twice in the fourth generation of his pedigree.
