= Chic (horse) =

British-bred Thoroughbred racehorse

Chic (foaled February 27, 2000) is a chestnut Thoroughbred racehorse. A filly, she is owned and bred by Cheveley Park Stud and was trained by Sir Michael Stoute. Out of the mare Exclusive, winner of the 1998 Group One Coronation Stakes, Chic was sired by Machiavellian, a French champion at age two who was a son of the very influential American sire Mr. Prospector. She is a half-sister to Echelon, the 2007 Matron Stakes winner, and is closely related to Entrepreneur, the 1997 2,000 Guineas winner.

== Career Highs ==
Chic won the 2004 Hungerford Stakes and the Celebration Mile, taking the latter again in 2005. She remains the only horse to have back-to-back wins in this race. In 2007 Chic's half sister Echelon also went on to win this race. In Chic's short career she earned £281,600 in prize money, and won 6 times from 20 starts.

== Race performances ==
Date	Placing	Beat by	Location	Distance
24 August 2002	4th	Ego	Nmk	6GF
14 October 2002	4th	Star Sensation	Lei	7GF
7 May 2003	1st	Won	Chs	7GF
4 June 2003	1st	Won	Kem	8GF
21 June 2003	3rd	Hold to Ransom	Asc	8FM
21 August 2003	6th	Vanderlin	Yor	7GF
11 September 2003	2nd	Tantina	Don	7GD
11 October 2003	1st	Won	Asc	7GF
20 May 2004	6th	Gonfilia	Goo	8GF
16 June 2004	7th	Favourable Terms	Asc	8GF
30 July 2004	3rd	Phantom Wind	Goo	7GF
14 August 2004	1st	Won	Nby	7GD
28 August 2004	1st	Won	Goo	8GS
2 October 2004	2nd	Attraction	Nmk	8GD
9 July 2005	6th	Autumn Glory	Lin	8ST
27 July 2005	12th	Proclamation	Goo	8SFT
28 August 2005	1st	Won	Goo	8GD
10 September 2005	2nd	Attraction	Leo	8GD/Y
1 October 2005	5th	Peeress	Nmk	8GS
15 October 2005	7th	David Junior	Nmk	10GS
