= Darryll Holland =

United Kingdom flat racing jockey

Personal information
- Born: 14 June 1972 (age 54) Manchester, England
- Occupation: Jockey

Horse racing career
- Sport: Horse racing

Major racing wins
- Queen Elizabeth II Stakes (2003); Fillies' Mile (2006); Sun Chariot Stakes (2000, 2007); Yorkshire Oaks (1997); Dewhurst Stakes (2003); Pretty Polly Stakes (2004); Grosser Preis von Bayern (1998); Preis der Diana (2006); Prix de l'Abbaye de Longchamp (2002); International Stakes (2003); King's Stand Stakes (2004); July Cup (2002); St. James's Palace Stakes (2003); Coronation Cup (2004); Eclipse Stakes (1999, 2003); Goodwood Cup (1998)

Racing awards
- British Champion Apprentice (1991); Lester Awards; Apprentice Jockey of the Year (1991); Flat Ride of the Year (1998, 2002)

Significant horses
- Almerita, Chorist, Compton Admiral, Continent, Danceabout, Double Trigger, Falbrav, Luso, Majestic Roi, Milk It Mick, My Emma, Simply Perfect, The Tatling, Warrsan, Zafeen
- Updated on 22 October 2023

Darryll Paul Holland (born 14 June 1972 in Manchester, England) is a United Kingdom flat racing jockey who has ridden for trainers such as Luca Cumani, Geoff Wragg, and Mark Johnston.

In 1991 he was the British Champion Apprentice and won the Lester Award for Apprentice Jockey of the Year. He has also received two further Lester awards for ride of the year on Double Trigger in the 1998 Goodwood Cup and Just James in 2002 at Newmarket. He finished third in his first Epsom Derby in 1993, on the 150/1 shot Blues Traveller. He went on to finish second in the 2006 Epsom Derby on 66/1 Dragon Dancer beaten a short head by Sir Percy.

== Major wins ==
(United Kingdom) Great Britain

- Coronation Cup – (1) – Warrsan (2004)
- Dewhurst Stakes – (1) – Milk It Mick (2003)
- Eclipse Stakes – (2) – Compton Admiral (1999), Falbrav (2003)
- Fillies' Mile – (1) – Simply Perfect (2006)
- International Stakes – (1) – Falbrav (2003)
- July Cup – (1) – Continent (2002)
- King's Stand Stakes – (1) – The Tatling (2004)
- Queen Elizabeth II Stakes – (1) – Falbrav (2003)
- St. James's Palace Stakes – (1) – Zafeen (2003)
- Sun Chariot Stakes – (2) – Danceabout (2000), Majestic Roi (2007)
- Yorkshire Oaks – (1) – My Emma (1997)

France

- Prix de l'Abbaye de Longchamp – (1) – Continent (2002)

Germany

- Preis der Diana – (1) – Almerita (2006)
- Rheinland-Pokal – (1) – Luso (1998)

(Republic of Ireland) Ireland

- Pretty Polly Stakes – (1) – Chorist (2004)

Italy

- Gran Criterium – (1) – Pearl of Love (2003)
- Oaks d'Italia – (1) – Menhoubah (2004)
- Premio Parioli – (1) – Dupont (2002)
- Premio Regina Elena – (1) – Love of Dubai (2008)

Singapore

- Singapore Derby – (1) All The Way (2000)
- Kranji Mile – (1) Pacific Prince (2000)
