= Doyen (horse) =

Irish-bred Thoroughbred racehorse

- Racing colours of Godolphin
- Sire: Sadler's Wells
- Grandsire: Northern Dancer
- Dam: Moon Cactus
- Damsire: Kris
- Sex: Stallion
- Foaled: 2000
- Country: Ireland
- Colour: Bay
- Breeder: Sheikh Mohammed
- Owner: Sheikh Mohammed
- Trainer: André Fabre; Saeed bin Suroor
- Record: 13:5-2-0
- Earnings: £708,623

Major wins
- Prix du Lys (2003); Hardwicke Stakes (2004); King George VI and Queen Elizabeth Stakes (2004)
- Last updated on 25 July 2010

Doyen (foaled 22 April 2000) is a retired Thoroughbred racehorse, who was bred in Ireland but trained in France, Dubai and the United Kingdom during a racing career which lasted from 2002 to 2005. He is best known for winning the 2004 King George VI and Queen Elizabeth Stakes.

== Background ==
Doyen is a tall, rangy bay horse with a large white star, bred at the Kildangan Stud in Ireland by his owner Sheikh Mohammed and raised at the Dalham Hall Stud at Newmarket. He was sired by Sadler's Wells out of the mare Moon Cactus, making him a full brother to the Oaks winner Moonshell.

== Racing career ==
=== 2002: two-year-old season ===
Doyen was originally sent into training with André Fabre in France. He was not a precocious colt and did not appear on a racecourse until the autumn of 2002, when he ran fifth in a minor event for unraced horses at Maisons-Laffitte.

=== 2003: three-year-old season ===
At three, Doyen proved himself to be a top-class middle-distance performer in a campaign which saw him moved up in grade with each race. After capturing a minor race at Saint-Cloud, he won the Listed Coupe des Trois Ans at Lyon-Parilly "easily" by two lengths. Moved up to Group Race standard for the first time in June 2004, he outpaced his opponents to record a four length win in the Prix du Lys at Longchamp.

On Doyen's next start he ran in the Prix Niel at Longchamp in September. As usual the race attracted a top-class field, including the Prix du Jockey-Club winner, Dalakhani and The Derby winner, Kris Kin. Doyen raced in last place in the early stages, before moving into contention in the straight. He was the horse to seriously challenge Dalakhani, finishing a length and a half behind the Aga Khan's colt, with Kris Kin well beaten in third. On his final start of the year he was made 11-2 third favourite for the Prix de l'Arc de Triomphe. He raced prominently, before being moved wide to make a challenge in the straight, but although he stayed on well he was unable to reach the lead, and finished fourth to Dalakhani.

=== 2004: four-year-old season ===
In the winter of 2003/4 Doyen was transferred from France to the Sheikh's Godolphin stable. On his debut for Saeed bin Suroor he ran second to Warrsan in the Coronation Cup at Epsom. He was then sent to Royal Ascot for the Hardwicke Stakes, where he produced his best performance to date, taking the lead in the straight and pulling clear to win by six lengths in a course record time of 2:26.53. Frankie Dettori, riding the colt for the fifth time was enthusiastic- "What a performance – he just took my breath away,".

So impressive was Doyen's victory that he was made clear favourite for the following month's King George VI and Queen Elizabeth Stakes over the same course and distance, and he was even blamed for the absence of top-class three-year-olds in the race. On the day, he fully justified his reputation, winning by an easy three lengths in a style described The Independent's correspondent as " simply magnificent". Dettori praised the colt saying, "I have never had a horse travel like he did today...he was absolutely devastating".

The King George win could have been the first of many Group One successes, and Sheikh Mohammed missed seeing his colt Rule of Law win the St Leger in order to watch Doyen run in the Irish Champion Stakes. He started odds-on favourite but ran poorly, failing to produce his usual acceleration and finishing seventh. The Champion Stakes saw a similar disappointment, with Doyen again starting favourite but finishing well beaten behind Haafhd.

Three more unplaced efforts in 2005 saw him retired to stud.

== Assessment ==
In the 2004 World Thoroughbred Racehorse Rankings Doyen was awarded a figure of 127, making him the third best racehorse in the world, the highest-rated European and the highest-rated turf performer.

== Stud career ==
Doyen was retired to stand at his owner's Dalham Hall Stud at Newmarket. In 2009 he was transferred to Gestüt Auenquelle in Germany. To date the best of his progeny have been Lady's Purse (Prix de Royaumont) and Sneek A Peek (Premio Federico Tesio). He has since been transferred to Sunnyhill Stud, County Kildare, Ireland.

== Pedigree ==
Pedigree of Doyen (IRE), bay stallion, 2000
Sire Sadler's Wells	Northern Dancer	Nearctic	Nearco
Sire Sadler's Wells	Northern Dancer	Nearctic	Lady Angela
Sire Sadler's Wells	Northern Dancer	Natalma	Native Dancer
Sire Sadler's Wells	Northern Dancer	Natalma	Almahmoud
Sire Sadler's Wells	Fairy Bridge	Bold Reason	Hail To Reason
Sire Sadler's Wells	Fairy Bridge	Bold Reason	Lalun
Sire Sadler's Wells	Fairy Bridge	Special	Forli
Sire Sadler's Wells	Fairy Bridge	Special	Thong
Dam Moon Cactus	Kris	Sharpen Up	Atan
Dam Moon Cactus	Kris	Sharpen Up	Rocchetta
Dam Moon Cactus	Kris	Doubly Sure	Reliance
Dam Moon Cactus	Kris	Doubly Sure	Soft Angels
Dam Moon Cactus	Lady Moon	Mill Reef	Never Bend
Dam Moon Cactus	Lady Moon	Mill Reef	Milan Mill
Dam Moon Cactus	Lady Moon	Moonlight Night	Levmoss
Dam Moon Cactus	Lady Moon	Moonlight Night	Lovely Light (Family: 1-s)
