= Attraction (horse) =

British-bred Thoroughbred racehorse

- Sire: Efisio
- Grandsire: Formidable
- Dam: Flirtation
- Damsire: Pursuit of Love
- Sex: Mare
- Foaled: 19 February 2001
- Country: Scotland/UK
- Colour: Bay
- Breeder: Floors Farming
- Owner: Duke of Roxburghe
- Trainer: Mark Johnston
- Record: 15:10-2-0
- Earnings: £899,597

Major wins
- Queen Mary Stakes (2003); Cherry Hinton Stakes (2003); 1000 Guineas (2004); Irish 1,000 Guineas (2004); Coronation Stakes (2004); Sun Chariot Stakes (2004); Matron Stakes (2005)

Awards
- European Champion Two-Year-Old Filly (2003); British Champion Two-Year-Old Filly (2003)
- Last updated on March 12, 2007

Attraction (foaled 19 February 2001) is a retired British Thoroughbred racehorse and broodmare who was bred in Scotland and trained in England. She won several important races and was the first horse to win both the 1000 Guineas and the Irish 1,000 Guineas. In a career which lasted from 2003 to 2005, she ran fifteen times and won ten races. She was also well known for her unusual and distinctive action.

== Background ==
Attraction was bred by her owner, the Duke of Roxburghe, at his stud at Floors Castle near Kelso, Scotland. She is one of many good horses sired by Efisio and is a half-sister to several minor winners.

Unlike the overwhelming majority of racehorses, Attraction's female family cannot be traced back to one of the originally accepted Thoroughbred foundation mares. The family was therefore considered "half-bred" until it was admitted to the General Stud Book in 1969.

Attraction was born with crooked forelegs, a flaw that became even more apparent when she galloped. Because of this, her breeder believed that it would be impossible to sell her, and decided to race her under his own colours. Her action was variously described as resembling "a helicopter" and "a demented haymaker wielding a scythe." She was eventually sent into training with Mark Johnston at Middleham, North Yorkshire.

== Racing career ==
=== 2003: two-year-old season ===
Attraction made her debut in April 2003 with a five-length win in a minor stakes race at Nottingham. She followed up with wins in a small event at Thirsk and the Listed Hilary Needler Trophy at Beverley, before being sent south for the Queen Mary Stakes at Royal Ascot. Attraction was sent off the 13/8 favourite. She led from the start and won by three lengths from Catstar, with the third-place finisher Majestic Desert a further five lengths back.

Three weeks later she was hampered at the start on the Cherry Hinton Stakes at Newmarket, but the interference made no difference to the result as she took the lead a furlong out and pulled away to win by five lengths. She was to have been aimed at the Cheveley Park Stakes, but leg problems and a broken pedal bone put her out for the rest of the season.

=== 2004: three-year-old season ===
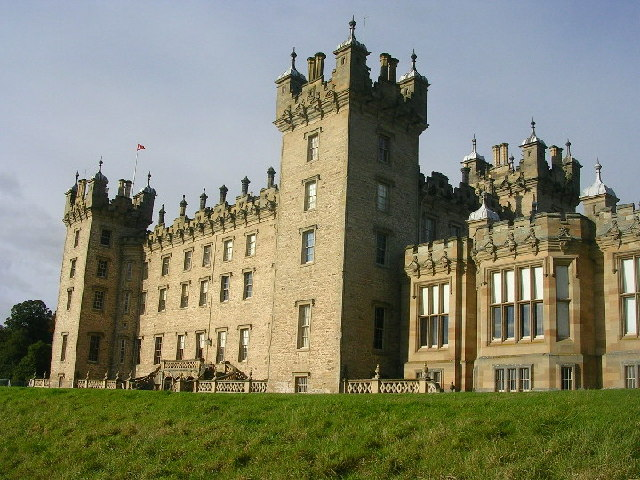
Floors Castle: Attraction was foaled at the Castle's stud and retired there at the end of her racing career

Attraction began her three-year-old career by going for the Classic 1,000 Guineas, for which she was made 11/2 second favourite. She took the lead early and after being seriously pressured for the first time in her career, stayed on to beat Sundrop by half a length. After the race, Johnston said: "She doesn't have the most perfect physical confirmation in the world, but believe me, there are a lot worse horses than her. She is a champion two-year-old, the best in Europe, and now she is a Classic winner. She didn't just win that, she galloped and stayed all the way to the line. I am thrilled to see it happen. Everybody put doubts in my mind about her stamina, but really I never doubted her." Three weeks later, she became the first winner of the 1,000 Guineas to win the Irish equivalent, leading from the start as usual and keeping on strongly to beat Alexander Goldrun by a length, leading J. A. McGrath to describe her as "a truly great filly". Attraction then returned to Royal Ascot and extended her unbeaten run to eight with a win in the Coronation Stakes. Mick Channon, trainer of the runner-up Majestic Desert, said of Attraction, "You probably won't see another horse like her in your lifetime."

Her unbeaten run came to an end in her next race, as she was beaten by the European Champion Older Horse Soviet Song in the Falmouth Stakes at Newmarket. She then ran the first bad race of her career, failing to cope with the soft ground and being virtually pulled up in the Prix Jacques Le Marois. The Matron Stakes at Leopardstown saw a rematch with Soviet Song, and Attraction again gave best to the older filly, although the margin was significantly closer than it had been at Newmarket. Attraction was to have ended her season with a run in the Queen Elizabeth II Stakes but was withdrawn by Mark Johnston, who was unhappy with the state of the ground. Instead, she was re-routed to the Sun Chariot Stakes and ended her year with a win, scoring by a neck from the Celebration Mile winner Chic with Nebraska Tornado in third.

=== 2005: four-year-old season ===
Attraction was kept in training at four, but injury restricted her to just three starts. She made no show behind Bullish Luck in the Champions Mile at Sha Tin in May, and could finish only fourth in the Hungerford Stakes at Newbury three months later. On her final start, however, she came back to her best to beat Chic in the Matron Stakes with the 2005 1,000 Guineas winner Virginia Waters back in third. Johnston was delighted: "It is great to silence the critics, she was so gutsy and she really deserved it."

== Assessment ==
At two Attraction was the highest ranked filly in Europe with an official rating of 119, two pounds below the champion colt Bago and was awarded the Cartier Racing Award for European Champion Two-Year-Old Filly.

She was also named British Champion Two-Year-Old Filly by the British Horseracing Board.

At three she was given a rating of 118 by the World Thoroughbred Racehorse Rankings, making her the third best filly in the world, and the best three-year-old filly in the world over one mile. She was beaten to the title of European Champion Three-Year-Old Filly by Ouija Board.

== Breeding record ==
Attraction was retired to her owner's stud at Floors Castle. Her progeny to date include:

- 2007 Elation (IRE): Bay filly, foaled 1 March, by Cape Cross (IRE), minor winner in England 2009. Died in 2011.
- 2008 Devastation (GB): Bay filly, foaled 26 March, by Montjeu (IRE), minor winner in England 2010. Died in 2011.
- 2009 Subtraction (IRE): Bay colt, by Pivotal (GB) – unraced. Died in 2016.
- 2010 Cushion (GB): Bay filly, foaled 12 April, by Galileo (IRE), minor winner and Listed Race placed in England 2013.
- 2011 Fountain of Youth (IRE): Bay colt, foaled 10 April, by Oasis Dream (GB) – won G3 Sapphire S in Ireland and 4th LR Windsor Castle Stakes at Royal Ascot in England 2013.
- 2013 Huntlaw (GB): Bay gelding, foaled 6 May, by Oasis Dream (GB) – won 4 races from 9 starts to date (2016-09-27) in Britain 2015–16.
- 2015 Elarqam (GB): Bay colt by Frankel, sold to Shadwell for 1.6m guineas at Tattersalls October Book 1 as a yearling – won 5 races including Somerville Tattersall Stakes, Festival Stakes, Gala Stakes, York Stakes
- 2016 Maydanny (IRE): bay colt (later gelded), by Dubawi. Won four races including Doonside Cup.
- 2017 Motion (GB): bay filly, by Frankel. Unplaced in her only race.
- 2018 Sayf El Dawla (GB): bay colt, by Frankel. Won two races.
- 2019 Imperial Crown (GB): bay colt (later gelded), by Frankel. Third in his only races.
- 2020 Dubawi Delight (GB): bay colt, by Dubawi
- 2021 Audition (GB): bay filly, by Kingman
- 2022 Magnetite (GB): bay colt, by Frankel

== Pedigree ==
Pedigree of Attraction (GB), bay mare, 2001
Sire Efisio (GB) 1982	Formidable; 1975	Forli	Aristophanes
Sire Efisio (GB) 1982	Formidable; 1975	Forli	Trevisa
Sire Efisio (GB) 1982	Formidable; 1975	Native Partner	Raise a Native
Sire Efisio (GB) 1982	Formidable; 1975	Native Partner	Dinner Partner
Sire Efisio (GB) 1982	Eldoret; 1976	High Top	Derring-Do
Sire Efisio (GB) 1982	Eldoret; 1976	High Top	Camenae
Sire Efisio (GB) 1982	Eldoret; 1976	Bamburi	Ragusa
Sire Efisio (GB) 1982	Eldoret; 1976	Bamburi	Kilifi
Dam Flirtation (GB) 1994	Pursuit of Love; 1989	Groom Dancer	Blushing Groom
Dam Flirtation (GB) 1994	Pursuit of Love; 1989	Groom Dancer	Featherhill
Dam Flirtation (GB) 1994	Pursuit of Love; 1989	Dance Quest	Green Dancer
Dam Flirtation (GB) 1994	Pursuit of Love; 1989	Dance Quest	Polyponder
Dam Flirtation (GB) 1994	Eastern Shore; 1979	Sun Prince	Princely Gift
Dam Flirtation (GB) 1994	Eastern Shore; 1979	Sun Prince	Costa Sola
Dam Flirtation (GB) 1994	Eastern Shore; 1979	Land Ho	Primera
Dam Flirtation (GB) 1994	Eastern Shore; 1979	Land Ho	Lucasland (Family: B3)
