= Haafhd =

British-bred Thoroughbred racehorse

- Racing silks of Hamdan Al Maktoum
- Sire: Alhaarth
- Grandsire: Unfuwain
- Dam: Al Bahathri
- Damsire: Blushing Groom
- Sex: Stallion
- Foaled: 18 February 2001 (age 24)
- Country: Great Britain
- Colour: Chestnut
- Breeder: Shadwell Stud
- Owner: Hamdan Al Maktoum
- Trainer: Barry Hills
- Record: 9: 5-0-2
- Earnings: £492,288

Major wins
- Craven Stakes (2004); 2000 Guineas Stakes (2004); Champion Stakes (2004)
- Last updated on 22 June 2007

Haafhd (foaled 18 February 2001) is a retired British Thoroughbred racehorse and active stallion, best known for winning the 2000 Guineas Stakes and Champion Stakes in 2004.

== Background ==
Haafhd, a bright chestnut horse standing 15 2½ hands high (1.59 m) with a white star, was bred by his owner's Shadwell Stud. Both his parents had been successful racehorses for Hamdan Al Maktoum; his sire is the Dewhurst Stakes winner Alhaarth, whilst his dam Al Bahathri won the Irish 1,000 Guineas. He is a half-brother to the Challenge Stakes winner Munir and the Coronation Stakes runner-up Hasbah. The colt, whose name is derived from an Arabic word (حامية) meaning "protector" was sent into training with Barry Hills at Lambourn, and was ridden in all his races by Barry's son Richard Hills.

== Racing career ==
=== 2003: two-year-old season ===
Haafhd began his racing career with a win in a maiden race at Newmarket in August 2003, and showed himself to be a colt of Group race potential with an "impressive" five length win in the Listed Washington Singer Stakes two weeks later. He was made odds-on favourite for the Champagne Stakes at Doncaster in September, but could finish only third behind Lucky Story. On his final appearance as a juvenile, he finished third in Dewhurst Stakes, behind Milk It Mick, a horse he had already defeated twice, and Three Valleys.

In the International Classification of two-year-olds, published in January 2004, Haafhd was allotted a figure of 115, rating him the tenth best colt of the year, six pounds below the Champion Bago.

=== 2004: three-year-old season ===
On his three-year-old debut Haafhd ran out a five length winner over Three Valleys in the Craven Stakes, confirming himself as a leading contender for the 2000 Guineas Stakes over the same course and distance sixteen days later. The Guardian's correspondent commented that "it is a long time... since a Craven was won in such a decisive fashion". In the classic, Haafhd moved up to take the lead two furlongs out and, despite drifting right, won by one and three-quarter lengths from Snow Ridge, Azamour, Grey Swallow and Whipper. After the race, Barry Hills ruled out the possibility of a Derby challenge whilst comparing Haafhd favourably to his 1979 2000 Guineas winner Tap On Wood. He also complimented the horse's temperament, calling him "a trainer's dream, so laid-back, with a great attitude to life".

These two excellent performances were followed by two disappointing efforts. In the St James's Palace Stakes at Royal Ascot, he took the lead in the straight, but faded into fourth behind Azamour. A month later he made little impact in the Sussex Stakes, again fading in the closing stages to finish ninth of the eleven runners behind Soviet Song.

His final start saw him return to his best form. Sent off a relatively unconsidered 12-1 shot in the Champion Stakes he moved up to take the lead a furlong out and won by two and a half lengths from the filly Chorist, with Azamour back in third and good horses such as Refuse to Bend, Norse Dancer, Doyen and Lucky Story amongst the also-rans. Barry Hills was visibly moved by the performance and called Haafhd "the best miler I have trained".

Four days after the Champion Stakes win, it was announced that Haafhd would be retired to stand at his owner's stud. The decision was announced by Hamdan Al Maktoum's racing manager Angus Gold who explained that although the owner would have liked to have kept the colt in training, he had "decided he was a very important cog in his breeding operation.".

== Race record ==
Date	Race	Dist (f)	Course	Class	Prize (£K)	Odds	Runners	Placing	Margin	Time	Jockey	Trainer
1 August 2003	Hugo & the Huguenotes Maiden Stakes	6	Newmarket July	M	4	5/4	10	1	1	1:15.84	Richard Hills	Barry Hills
17 September 2003	Washington Singer Stakes	7	Newbury	L	14	9/4	8	1	5	1:23.04	Richard Hills	Barry Hills
12 September 2003	Champagne Stakes	7	Doncaster	3	79	10/11	6	3	2.25	1:27.92	Richard Hills	Barry Hills
18 October 2003	Dewhurst	7	Newmarket Rowley	1	142	7/1	12	3	1.5	1:25.22	Richard Hills	Barry Hills
15 April 2004	Craven Stakes	8	Newmarket Rowley	3	29	100/30	5	1	5	1:38.33	Richard Hills	Barry Hills
1 May 2004	2000 Guineas Stakes	8	Newmarket Rowley	1	174	11/2	14	1	1.75	1:36.64	Richard Hills	Barry Hills
20 June 2004	St James's Palace Stakes	8	Ascot	1	139	6/4	11	4	1.25	1:39.02	Richard Hills	Barry Hills
28 July 2004	Sussex Stakes	8	Goodwood	1	174	9/2	11	9	9.5	1:36.98	Richard Hills	Barry Hills
16 October 2004	Champion Stakes	10	Newmarket Rowley	1	215	12/1	11	1	2.5	2:06.90	Richard Hills	Barry Hills

.

== Assessment ==
In the 2004 World Thoroughbred Racehorse Rankings, Haafhd was rated at 124, making him the seventh best horse in the world, and the best horse in the world on turf in the Mile and Intermediate categories.

He was given a rating of 129 by Timeform in the same year.

== Stud career ==
Since being retired to his owner's Nunnery Stud, Haafhd has sired the winners of over 170 races. His best offspring is probably Silver Grecian, winner of the Superlative Stakes.

== Pedigree ==
Pedigree of Haafhd (GB), chestnut stallion, 2001
Sire Alhaarth (IRE) 1993	Unfuwain; 1985	Northern Dancer	Nearctic
Sire Alhaarth (IRE) 1993	Unfuwain; 1985	Northern Dancer	Natalma
Sire Alhaarth (IRE) 1993	Unfuwain; 1985	Height of Fashion	Bustino
Sire Alhaarth (IRE) 1993	Unfuwain; 1985	Height of Fashion	Highclere
Sire Alhaarth (IRE) 1993	Irish Valley; 1982	Irish River	Riverman
Sire Alhaarth (IRE) 1993	Irish Valley; 1982	Irish River	Irish Star
Sire Alhaarth (IRE) 1993	Irish Valley; 1982	Green Valley	Val de Loir
Sire Alhaarth (IRE) 1993	Irish Valley; 1982	Green Valley	Sly Pola
Dam Al Bahathri (USA) 1982	Blushing Groom; 1974	Red God	Nasrullah
Dam Al Bahathri (USA) 1982	Blushing Groom; 1974	Red God	Spring Rain
Dam Al Bahathri (USA) 1982	Blushing Groom; 1974	Runaway Bride	Wild Risk
Dam Al Bahathri (USA) 1982	Blushing Groom; 1974	Runaway Bride	Aimee
Dam Al Bahathri (USA) 1982	Chain Store; 1972	Nodouble	Noholme
Dam Al Bahathri (USA) 1982	Chain Store; 1972	Nodouble	Abla-Jay
Dam Al Bahathri (USA) 1982	Chain Store; 1972	General Store	To Market
Dam Al Bahathri (USA) 1982	Chain Store; 1972	General Store	General's Sister (Family: 9-e)
