= 2005–06 World Thoroughbred Racehorse Rankings =

The 2005–06 World Thoroughbred Racehorse Rankings is the 2005–06 edition of the World Thoroughbred Racehorse Rankings. It is an assessment of racehorses which was issued by the International Federation of Horseracing Authorities (IFHA) in August 2006. It includes horses aged three or older which raced or were trained during 2005–06 in countries where the flat racing year runs from August 1 to July 31 (and also South America, where it runs from July 1 to June 30). These countries are generally in the Southern Hemisphere, although some areas covered, such as Hong Kong and the United Arab Emirates, are actually north of the equator.

The ratings represent a weight value in pounds, with higher values given to horses which showed greater ability. It is judged that these weights would equalize the abilities of the horses if carried in a theoretical handicap race. The list includes all horses rated 115 or above, and it also shows the surface and the distances at which the rating was achieved.

The highest rating in the 2005–06 season was 124, which was given to the performance of Makybe Diva in the Melbourne Cup. In total, 47 horses were included in the list, 24 more than in the 2004–05 Rankings.

== Full rankings for 2005–06 ==
- Country foaled – Horse names are followed by a suffix indicating the country where foaled.
- Age – The ages shown for horses foaled in the Southern Hemisphere are as of their universal date of increase, August 1, 2005. The ages of those born in the Northern Hemisphere are taken from their equivalent date, January 1, 2006.
- Sex – The following abbreviations are used:
  - C – Colt – Ungelded male horse up to four-years-old.
  - F – Filly – Female horse up to four-years-old.
  - H – Horse – Ungelded male horse over four-years-old.
  - M – Mare – Female horse over four-years-old.
  - G – Gelding – Gelded male horse of any age.

Rank	Rating	Horse	Age	Sex	Trained	Surface	Distance (m)
1	124	Makybe Diva (GB)	7	M	Australia	Turf	3,200
2	123	David Junior (USA)	4	C	Great Britain	Turf	1,777
2	123	Electrocutionist (USA)	5	H	UAE	Dirt	2,000
2	123	Heart's Cry (JPN)	5	H	Japan	Turf	2,400
5	122	Vengeance of Rain (NZ)	5	G	Hong Kong	Turf	2,000
6	121	Silent Witness (AUS)	6	G	Hong Kong	Turf	1,200
7	120	Bullish Luck (USA)	7	G	Hong Kong	Turf	1,600
8	119	Eremein (AUS)	4	G	Australia	Turf	2,400
8	119	Maraahel (IRE)	5	H	Great Britain	Turf	2,000
8	119	Takeover Target (AUS)	6	G	Australia	Turf	1,000
11	118	Best Gift (NZ)	5	G	Hong Kong	Turf	2,000
11	118	Discreet Cat (USA)	3	C	UAE	Dirt	1,800
11	118	Hat Trick (JPN)	4	C	Japan	Turf	1,600
11	118	Mummify (AUS)	6	G	Australia	Turf	2,400
15	117	Lad of the Manor (NZ)	6	G	Australia	Turf	1,600 / 2,000
15	117	Ouija Board (GB)	5	M	Great Britain	Turf	2,400
15	117	Pride (FR)	6	M	France	Turf	2,000
18	116	Collier Hill (GB)	8	G	Great Britain	Turf	2,400
18	116	Danacourt (NZ)	4	G	Hong Kong	Turf	1,600
18	116	El Segundo (NZ)	4	G	Australia	Turf	2,000
18	116	Fields of Omagh (AUS)	8	G	Australia	Turf	2,040
18	116	God's Own (AUS)	3	C	Australia	Turf	1,000 / 1,600
18	116	National Colour (SAF)	3	F	South Africa	Turf	1,000
18	116	Racing to Win (AUS)	3	G	Australia	Turf	1,500
18	116	Railings (AUS)	4	G	Australia	Turf	2,400
18	116	Russian Pearl (NZ)	5	G	Hong Kong	Turf	1,600 / 2,000
18	116	The Tin Man (USA)	8	G	United States	Turf	1,777
18	116	Utopia (JPN)	6	H	Japan	Dirt	1,600
18	116	Vinnie Roe (IRE)	7	H	Ireland	Turf	3,200
18	116	Xcellent (NZ)	4	G	New Zealand	Turf	3,200
31	115	Cape of Good Hope (GB)	8	G	Hong Kong	Turf	1,200
31	115	Desert War (AUS)	5	G	Australia	Turf	1,600 / 2,000
31	115	Epalo (GER)	6	H	Germany	Turf	2,000
31	115	Eyeofthetiger (BRZ)	3	C	South Africa	Turf	2,200
31	115	Headturner (AUS)	3	G	Australia	Turf	2,400
31	115	Ilha da Vitoria (BRZ)	5	M	South Africa	Turf	2,000
31	115	Irridescence (SAF)	4	F	South Africa	Turf	1,777 / 2,000
31	115	Joyful Winner (AUS)	5	G	Hong Kong	Turf	1,400 / 1,600
31	115	Our Smoking Joe (AUS)	5	G	Australia	Turf	1,800 / 2,000 / 2,400
31	115	Paratroopers (AUS)	3	G	Australia	Turf	1,400 / 1,500 / 1,600
31	115	Proud Tower Too (USA)	4	C	United States	Dirt	1,200
31	115	Red Oog (AUS)	6	G	Australia	Turf	1,200
31	115	Simpatico Bribon (CHI)	3	C	Saudi Arabia	Dirt	1,800
31	115	Super Kid (NZ)	6	H	Hong Kong	Turf	1,400 / 1,600 / 2,000
31	115	The Duke (AUS)	6	G	Hong Kong	Turf	1,600
31	115	Touch of Land (FR)	5	H	France	Turf	2,000
31	115	Viva Pataca (GB)	4	G	Hong Kong	Turf	2,400

Certain horses may have also recorded a lesser rating over a distance different from that listed above. The IFHA publishes this information when the lower rating represents the overall top performance in a particular category. There were no such additional ratings for this season.

== Top ranked horses ==
The tables below show the top ranked horses overall, the top fillies and mares, and the top three-year-olds in the 2005–06 Rankings. They also show the top performers in various subdivisions of each group, which are defined by the distances of races, and the surfaces on which they are run. The IFHA recognizes five distance categories — Sprint, Mile, Intermediate, Long and Extended — identified by the acronym "SMILE". These are framed as follows:

- Sprint: 1,000–1,300m (1,000–1,599m for races in Canada and the United States)
- Mile: 1,301–1,899m (1,600–1,899m for races in Canada and the United States)
- Intermediate: 1,900–2,100m
- Long: 2,101–2,700m
- Extended: 2,701m +

All Horses
	All Surfaces	Dirt	Turf
All Distances	124 – Makybe Diva	123 – Electrocutionist	124 – Makybe Diva
Sprint	121 – Silent Witness	115 – Proud Tower Too	121 – Silent Witness
Mile	123 – David Junior	118 – Discreet Cat	123 – David Junior
Intermediate	123 – Electrocutionist	123 – Electrocutionist	122 – Vengeance of Rain
Long	123 – Heart's Cry	not listed	123 – Heart's Cry
Extended	124 – Makybe Diva	not listed	124 – Makybe Diva
Fillies and Mares
	All Surfaces	Dirt	Turf
All Distances	124 – Makybe Diva	not listed	124 – Makybe Diva
Sprint	116 – National Colour	not listed	116 – National Colour
Mile	115 – Irridescence	not listed	115 – Irridescence
Intermediate	117 – Pride	not listed	117 – Pride
Long	117 – Ouija Board	not listed	117 – Ouija Board
Extended	124 – Makybe Diva	not listed	124 – Makybe Diva
Three-Year-Olds
	All Surfaces	Dirt	Turf
All Distances	118 – Discreet Cat	118 – Discreet Cat	116 – God's Own; 116 – National Colour; 116 – Racing to Win
Sprint	116 – God's Own; 116 – National Colour	not listed	116 – God's Own; 116 – National Colour
Mile	118 – Discreet Cat	118 – Discreet Cat	116 – God's Own; 116 – Racing to Win
Intermediate	not listed	not listed	not listed
Long	115 – Eyeofthetiger; 115 – Headturner	not listed	115 – Eyeofthetiger; 115 – Headturner
Extended	not listed	not listed	not listed
