= Heart's Cry (horse) =

Japanese-bred Thoroughbred racehorse

Heart's Cry ハーツクライ
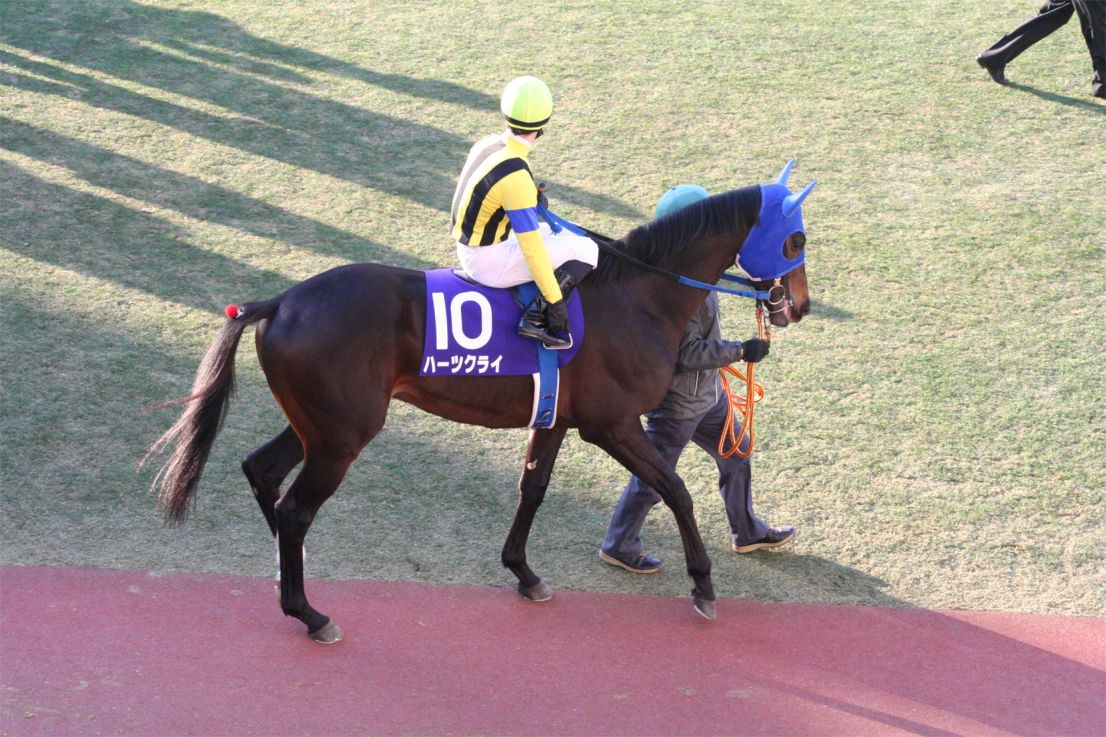
- Heart's Cry at the 2005 Arima Kinen.
- Breed: Thoroughbred
- Sire: Sunday Silence
- Grandsire: Halo
- Dam: Irish Dance
- Damsire: Tony Bin
- Sex: Stallion
- Foaled: April 15, 2001
- Died: March 9, 2023 (aged 21)
- Country: Japan
- Colour: Bay
- Breeder: Shadai Farm
- Owner: Shadai Race Horse Co
- Racing colours
- Trainer: Kojiro Hashiguchi
- Jockey: Christophe Lemaire
- Record: 19: 5-4-3
- Earnings: $8,054,175

Major wins
- Kyōto Shimbun Hai (2004); Arima Kinen (2005); Dubai Sheema Classic (2006)

Awards
- JRA Award for Best Older Male Horse (2005)

Heart's Cry (Japanese: ハーツクライ, Hepburn: Hātsu Kurai; 15 April 2001 – 9 March 2023) was a Japanese Thoroughbred racehorse and sire. In a racing career which lasted from January 2004 until November 2006, he ran nineteen times and won five races. In his first two seasons he was placed in many important races including the Tokyo Yushun, Takarazuka Kinen and Japan Cup, before recording a 16/1 upset victory over the Japanese Horse of the Year Deep Impact in the Arima Kinen at Nakayama Racecourse in December 2005. In the following year Heart's Cry proved himself in international competition, winning the Dubai Sheema Classic in the United Arab Emirates and finishing third in the King George VI and Queen Elizabeth Stakes in Britain. After his retirement from racing he became a successful breeding stallion.

== Background ==
Heart's Cry was a bay horse with a narrow white blaze and a white sock on his left hind leg, bred by the Yoshida family's Shadai Farm. He was sired by Sunday Silence, who won the 1989 Kentucky Derby, before retiring to stud in Japan where he was champion sire on thirteen consecutive occasions. His dam Irish Dance was a successful racemare who won the Niigata Daishoten and Niigata Kinen, both Grade III races in Japan. The horse was named after a number from the show Riverdance, in reference to his dam's name.

== Racing career ==
=== 2004: three-year-old season ===
Heart's Cry began his racing career by winning a ten furlong race at Kyoto Racecourse on 5 January 2004. A month later he was moved up to Group Three level and finished third in the Kisaragi Sho at the same course. He then won a ten furlong race at Hanshin Racecourse before finishing unplaced in the Satsuki Sho, the first leg of the Japanese Triple Crown. In May Heart's Cry won his first important race when he took the Group Two Kyoto Shimbun Hai, a trial race for the Tokyo Yushun (Japanese Derby), beating Suzuka Mambo by half a length. In the Tokyo Yushun four weeks later, Heart's Cry finished second of the eighteen runners, one and a half lengths behind the winner King Kamehameha.

Heart's Cry returned after a summer break to finish third to King Kamehameha in the Kobe Shimbun Hai, but then finished unplaced in the Kikuka Sho (Japanese St Leger), Japan Cup and Arima Kinen.

=== 2005: four-year-old season ===
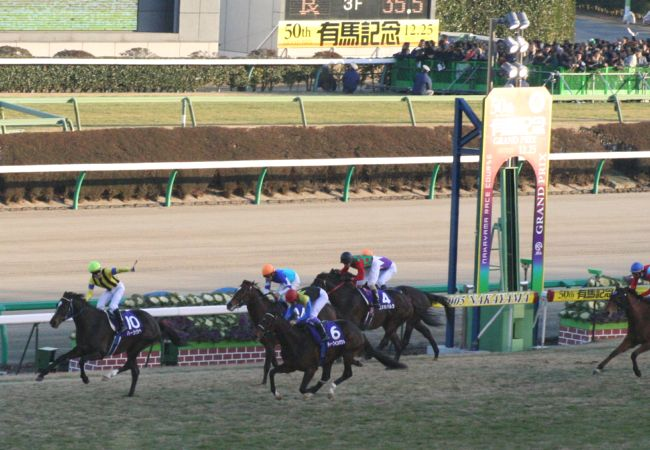
2005 Arima Kinen: Heart's Cry defeats Deep Impact

In his first five starts as a four-year-old, Heart's Cry ran well without winning. In Spring he finished second in the Group Two Osaka Hai and then ran fifth of the eighteen runners behind Suzuka Mambo in the two mile Tenno Sho. In June he finished strongly to take second place, a neck behind Sweep Tosho in the Takarazuka Kinen, beating major winners such as Zenno Rob Roy and Tap Dance City. He was then off the course for more than four months.

Heart's Cry returned in October to finish sixth in the Autumn Tenno Sho, in which he was ridden for the first time by Christophe Lemaire, before running in the Japan Cup a month later. Held up in the early stages, he was still fourteenth of the eighteen runners turning into the straight but then finished strongly and failed by a nose to catch the British runner Alkaased who won in a record time of 2:22.1. The beaten runners included Zenno Rob Roy, Ouija Board, Warrsan, Bago and Better Talk Now. On 25 December, Heart's Cry was one of sixteen runners invited to contest the Arima Kinen. The colt had gone ten races and nineteen months since his last win and started at odds of 16.1/1 while the undefeated three-year-old champion Deep Impact was made the 3/10 favourite. Lemaire rode the horse close to the lead before moving to the front in the straight and holding off the late challenge of Deep Impact to win by half a length.

=== 2006: five-year-old season ===
In 2006, Heart's Cry was campaigned internationally. In March he was sent to Dubai to contest the Dubai Sheema Classic at Nad Al Sheba. Ridden by Lemaire he contested the lead from the start, tactics which surprised his trainer Kojiro Hashiguchi. He went clear of the field in the straight and won by four and a quarter lengths from Collier Hill with the multiple Group One winners Ouija Board and Alexander Goldrun in fourth and fifth. In the August 2006 edition of the World Thoroughbred Racehorse Rankings, Heart's Cry was ranked the equal second best horse in the world, a pound behind Makybe Diva and equal with Electrocutionist and David Junior.

Four months after his run in Dubai, Heart's Cry appeared at Ascot Racecourse in England for Britain's most prestigious all-aged race, the King George VI and Queen Elizabeth Stakes. Lemaire claimed to be full of confidence before the race and Heart's Cry's participation attracted a large Japanese media contingent. Starting the 3/1 second favourite, he took the lead in the straight but was overtaken in the final furlong and finished third behind Hurricane Run and Electrocutionist. After his race at Ascot, Heart's Cry did not run again until the Japan Cup on 26 November. He started the 5.8/1 second favourite but ran disappointingly, finishing tenth of the eleven runners behind Deep Impact. After the race the Japan Racing Association announced that the horse had developed breathing problems which may have affected his performance, and his retirement was announced in early December.

== Racing form ==
Heart's Cry won five races and struck podium seven more times out of 19 starts. This data is available based on JBIS, netkeiba, Emirates Racing Authority and British Horseracing Authority.

Date	Racecourse	Race	Grade	Distance (Condition)	Entry	HN	Odds (Favored)	Finish	Time	Margins	Jockey	Winner (Runner-up)
2004 – three-year-old season
Jan 5	Kyoto	3yo Newcomer		2,000 m (Firm)	10	9	1.7 (1)	1st	2:06.0	–0.2	Yutaka Take	(Miya Taisen)
Feb 15	Kyoto	Kisaragi Sho	3	1,800 m (Firm)	14	8	16.7 (5)	3rd	1:48.6	0.6	Hideaki Miyuki	Meiner Brook
Mar 20	Hanshin	Wakaba Stakes	OP	1,800 m (Firm)	14	2	2.6 (2)	1st	2:00.2	0.0	Katsumi Ando	(Suzuka Mambo)
Apr 18	Nakayama	Satsuki Sho	1	2,000 m (Firm)	18	16	14.0 (5)	14th	2:00.0	1.4	Katsumi Ando	Daiwa Major
May 8	Kyoto	Kyoto Shimbun Hai	2	2,200 m (Firm)	11	11	3.8 (2)	1st	2:11.9	–0.1	Katsumi Ando	(Suzuka Mambo)
May 30	Tokyo	Tokyo Yushun	1	2,400 m (Firm)	18	5	17.1 (5)	2nd	2:23.5	0.2	Norihiro Yokoyama	King Kamehameha
Sep 26	Hanshin	Kobe Shimbun Hai	2	2,000 m (Firm)	8	8	2.4 (2)	3rd	1:59.4	0.4	Yutaka Take	King Kamehameha
Oct 24	Kyoto	Kikuka Sho	1	3,000 m (Firm)	18	10	2.7 (1)	7th	3:06.2	0.5	Yutaka Take	Delta Blues
Nov 28	Tokyo	Japan Cup	1	2,400 m (Firm)	16	3	6.5 (3)	10th	2:25.7	1.5	Yutaka Take	Zenno Rob Roy
Dec 26	Nakayama	Arima Kinen	1	2,500 m (Firm)	15	5	43.5 (10)	9th	2:30.5	1.0	Norihiro Yokoyama	Zenno Rob Roy
2005 – four-year-old season
Apr 3	Hanshin	Sankei Osaka Hai	2	2,000 m (Firm)	9	9	5.3 (4)	2nd	1:59.2	0.2	Norihiro Yokoyama	Sunrise Pegasus
May 1	Kyoto	Tenno Sho (Spring)	1	3,200 m (Firm)	18	16	13.7 (8)	5th	3:17.1	0.6	Norihiro Yokoyama	Suzuka Mambo
Jun 26	Hanshin	Takarazuka Kinen	1	2,200 m (Firm)	15	4	18.3 (3)	2nd	2:11.5	0.0	Norihiro Yokoyama	Sweep Tosho
Oct 30	Tokyo	Tenno Sho (Autumn)	1	2,000 m (Firm)	18	10	6.7 (2)	6th	2:00.4	0.3	Christophe Lemaire	Heavenly Romance
Nov 27	Tokyo	Japan Cup	1	2,400 m (Firm)	18	16	7.2 (2)	2nd	2:22.1	0.0	Christophe Lemaire	Alkaased
Dec 25	Nakayama	Arima Kinen	1	2,500 m (Firm)	16	10	17.1 (4)	1st	2:31.9	–0.1	Christophe Lemaire	(Deep Impact)
2006 – five-year-old season
Mar 25	Nad Al Sheba	Dubai Sheema Classic	1	2,400 m (Firm)	14	5	11/4 (2)	1st	2:31.9	0.8	Christophe Lemaire	(Collier Hill)
Jul 29	Ascot	KGVI & QEII Diamond Stakes	1	12 f (Firm)	6	4	3/1 (2)	3rd	2:30.4	0.2	Christophe Lemaire	Hurricane Run
Nov 26	Tokyo	Japan Cup	1	2,400 m (Firm)	11	1	5.8 (2)	10th	2:27.7	2.6	Christophe Lemaire	Deep Impact

Legend:
Turf

== Stud record ==
Heart's Cry was retired to become a stallion at his owners' Shadai Stallion Station on Hokkaido. He sired 44 individual group or graded race winners, 13 of them at Group 1 level. In addition, Heart's Cry is the damsire of Efforia, who was named the Japanese Horse of the Year of 2021, and Tagaloa, who won the Blue Diamond Stakes in 2020. He was retired from stud duties in 2021 at the age of 20. On March 9, 2023, staff of Shadai Stallion Station found Heart's Cry unable to stand. He died later the same day.

=== Major winners ===
c = colt, f = filly, g = gelding

bold = grade 1 stakes

**Foaled**	**Name**	**Sex**	**Major wins**
2008	Admire Rakti	c	**Caulfield Cup**
2009	Just A Way	c	**Tenno Sho (Autumn)**, **Dubai Duty Free**, **Yasuda Kinen**
2011	Nuovo Record	f	**Yushun Himba**
2011	One and Only	c	**Tokyo Yushun**
2012	Cheval Grand	c	**Japan Cup**
2014	Lys Gracieux	f	**Queen Elizabeth II Cup**, **Takarazuka Kinen**, **Cox Plate**, **Arima Kinen**
2014	Suave Richard	c	**Osaka Hai**, **Japan Cup**
2014	Yoshida	c	**Turf Classic Stakes**, Woodward Stakes
2015	Time Flyer	c	**Hopeful Stakes**
2017	Salios	c	**Asahi Hai Futurity Stakes**
2019	Do Deuce	c	**Asahi Hai Futurity Stakes**, **Tokyo Yushun**, **Arima Kinen**, **Tenno Sho (Autumn)**, **Japan Cup**
2019	Notturno	c	**Japan Dirt Derby**
2020	Continuous	c	**St Leger Stakes**

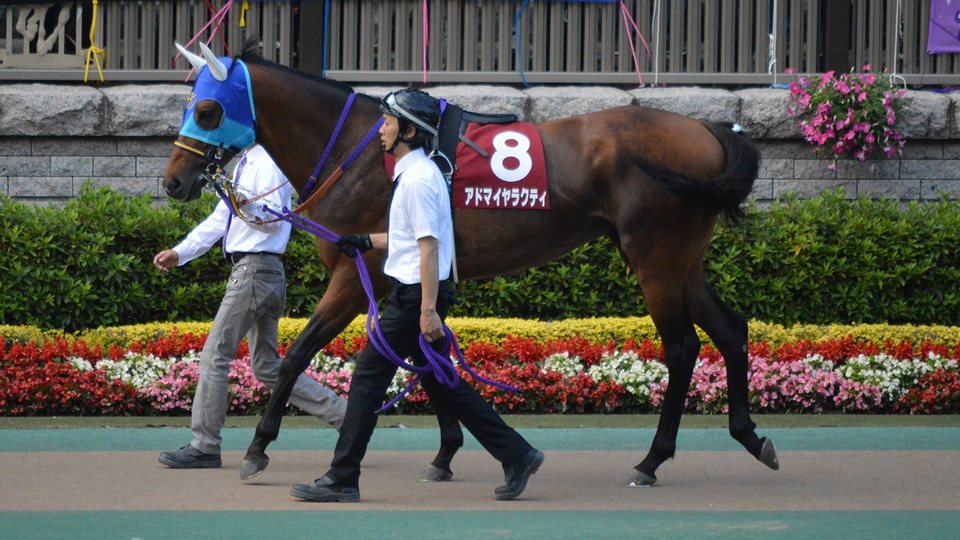
Admire Rakti

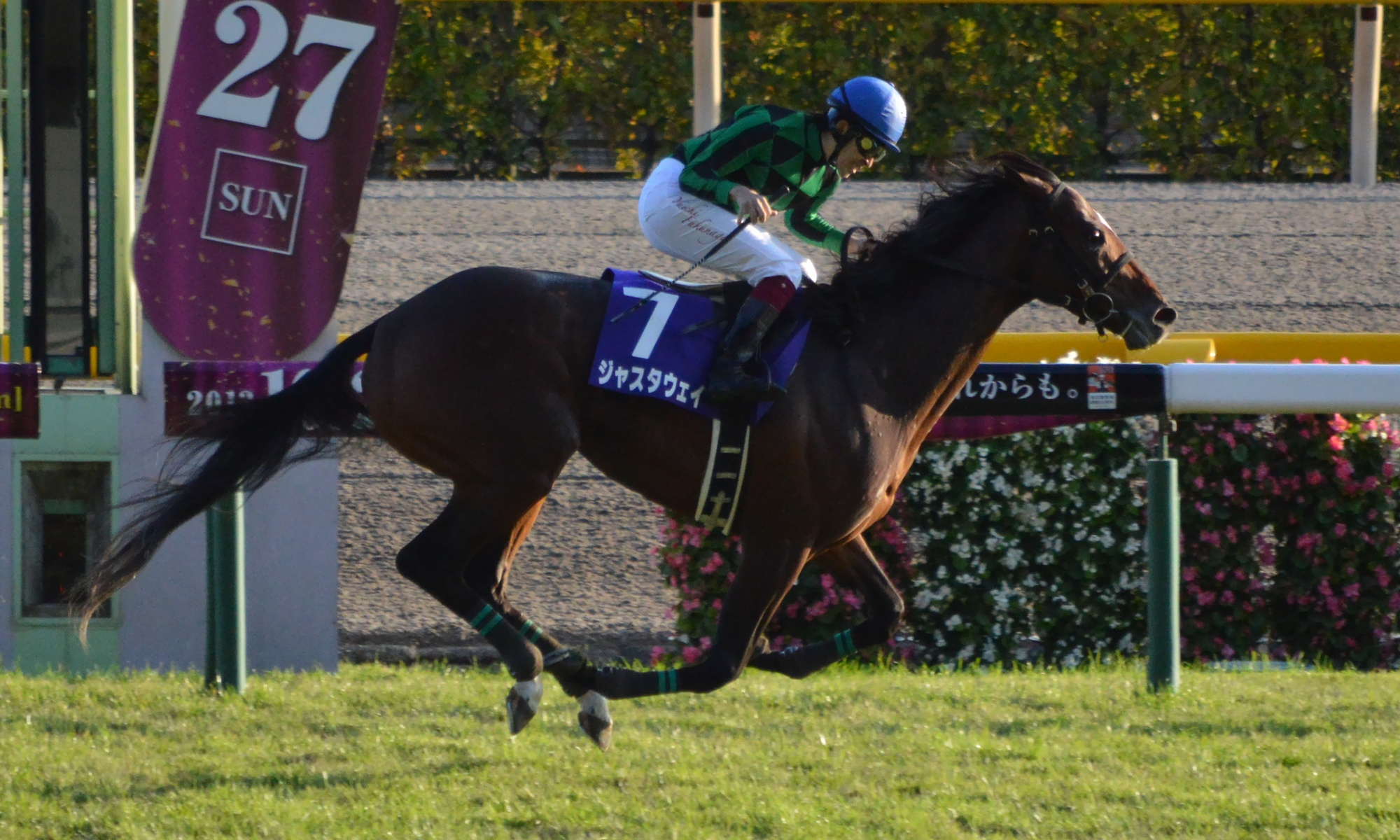
Just A Way

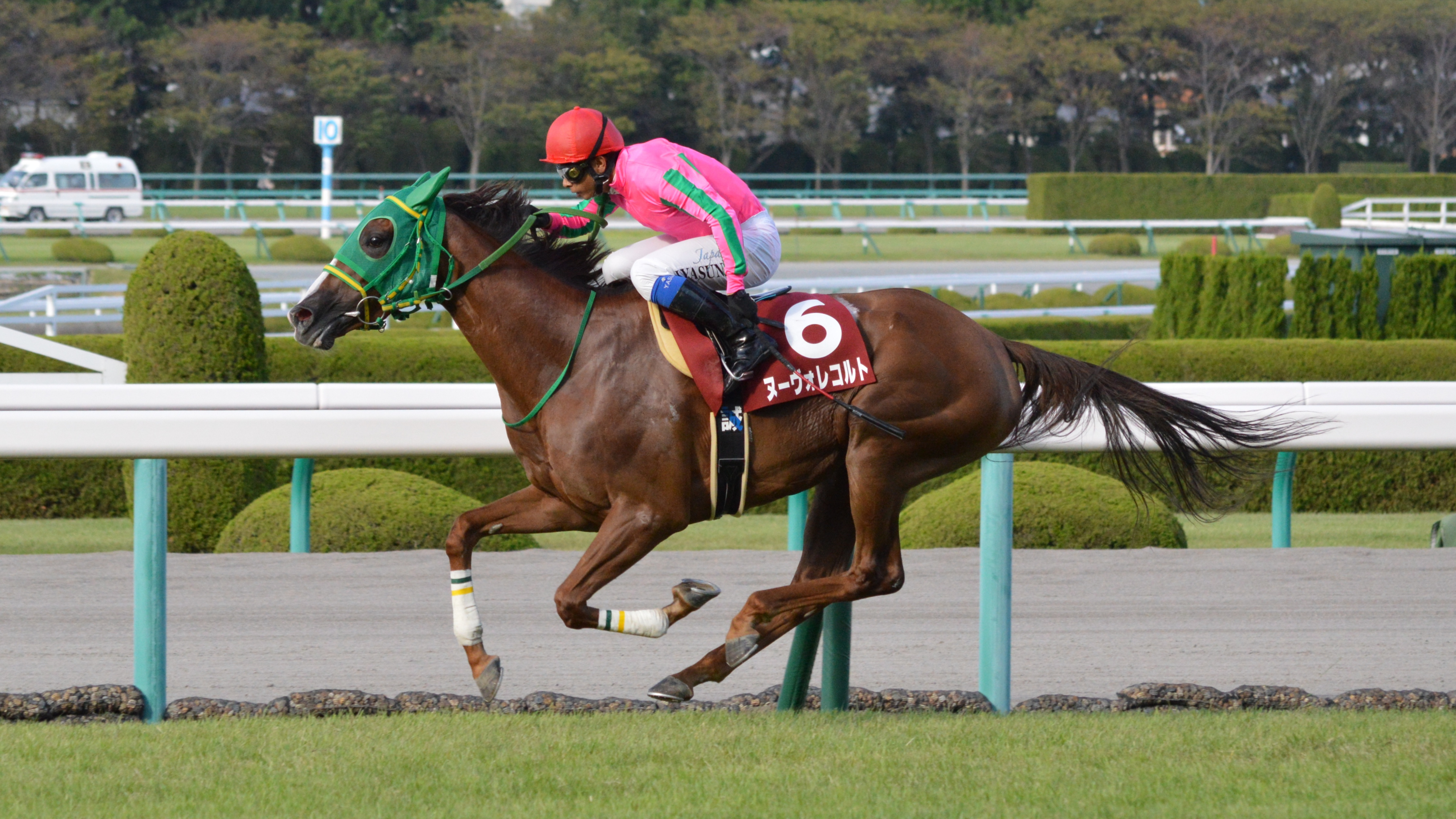
Nuovo Record

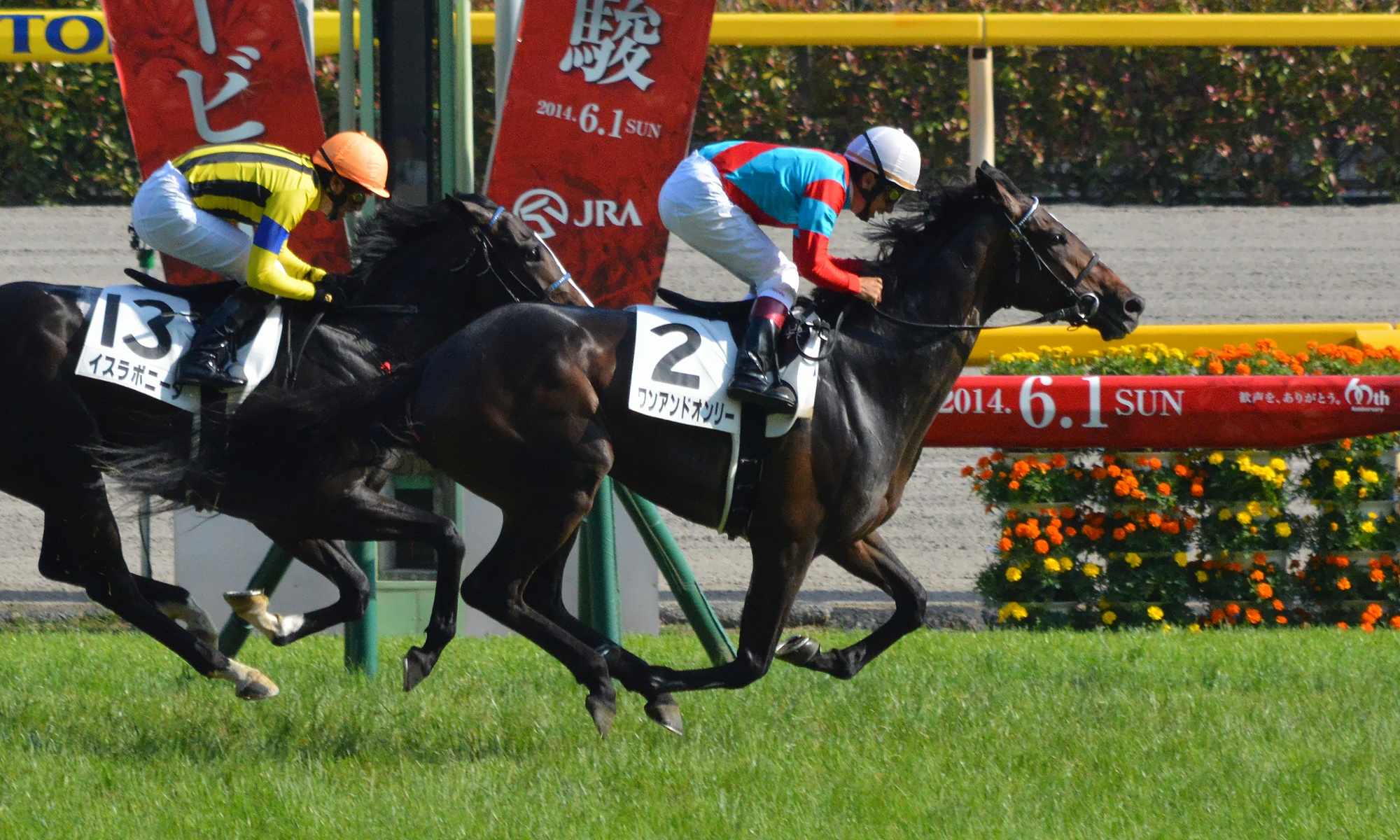
One and Only

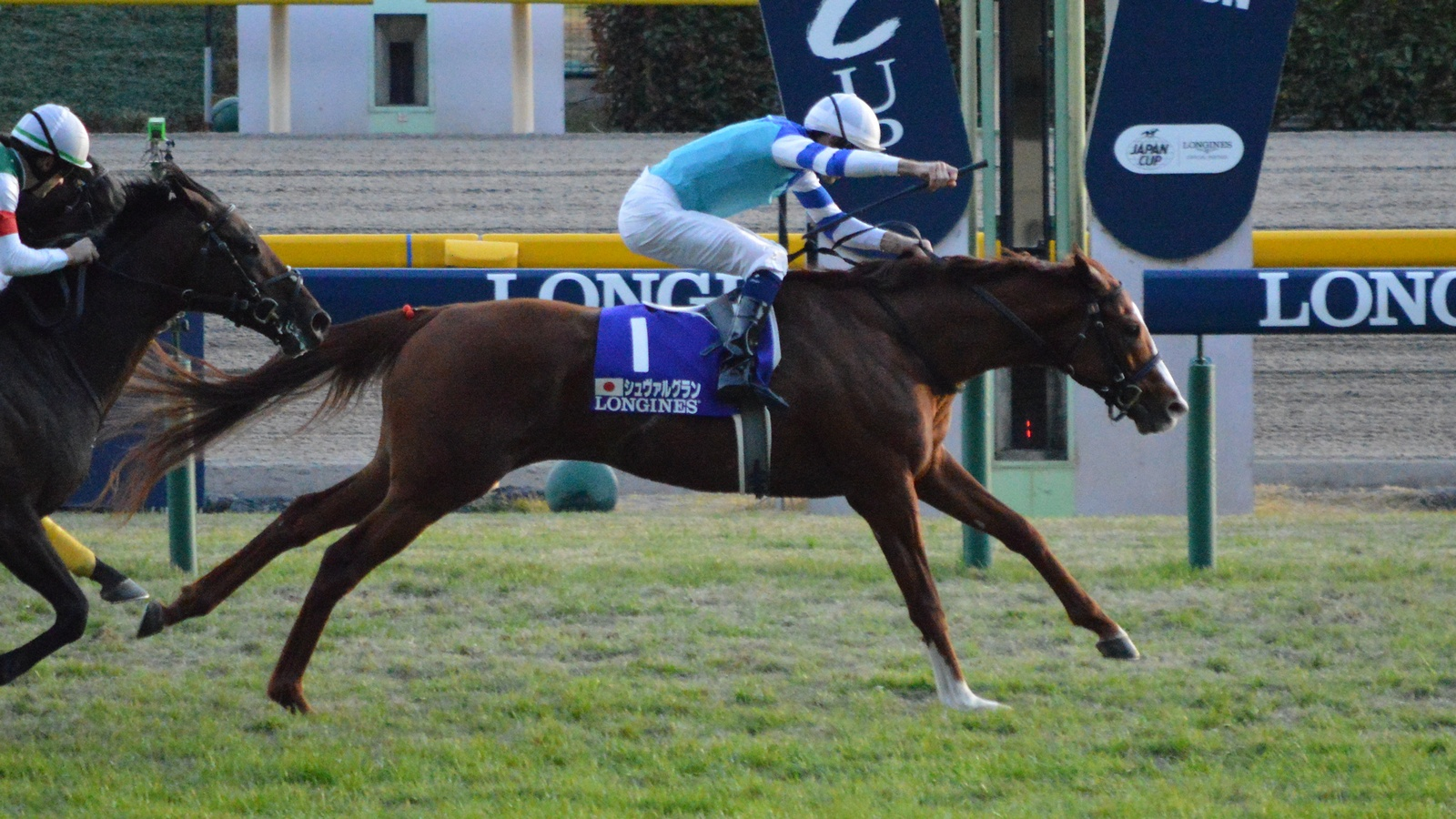
Cheval Grand

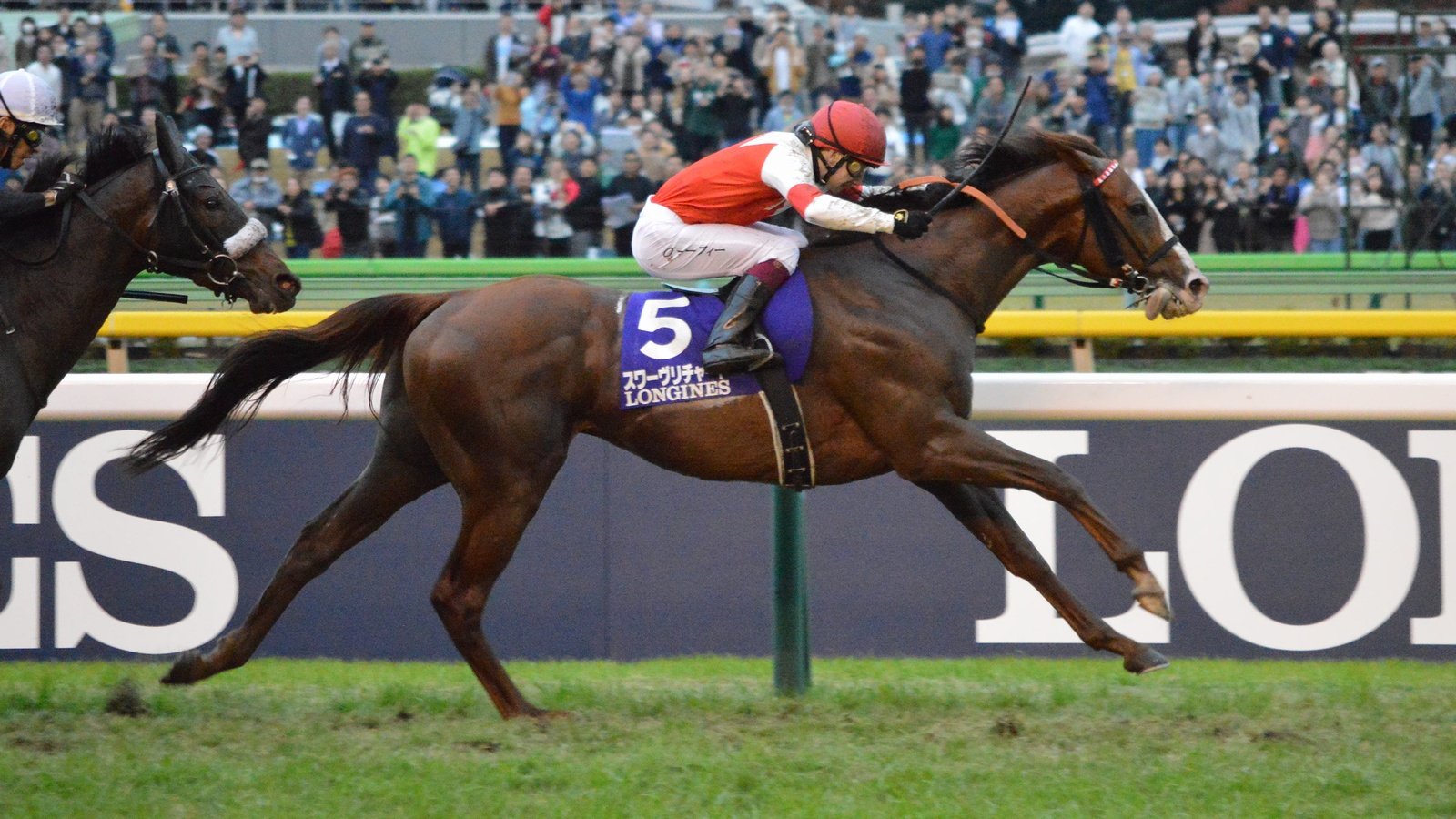
Suave Richard

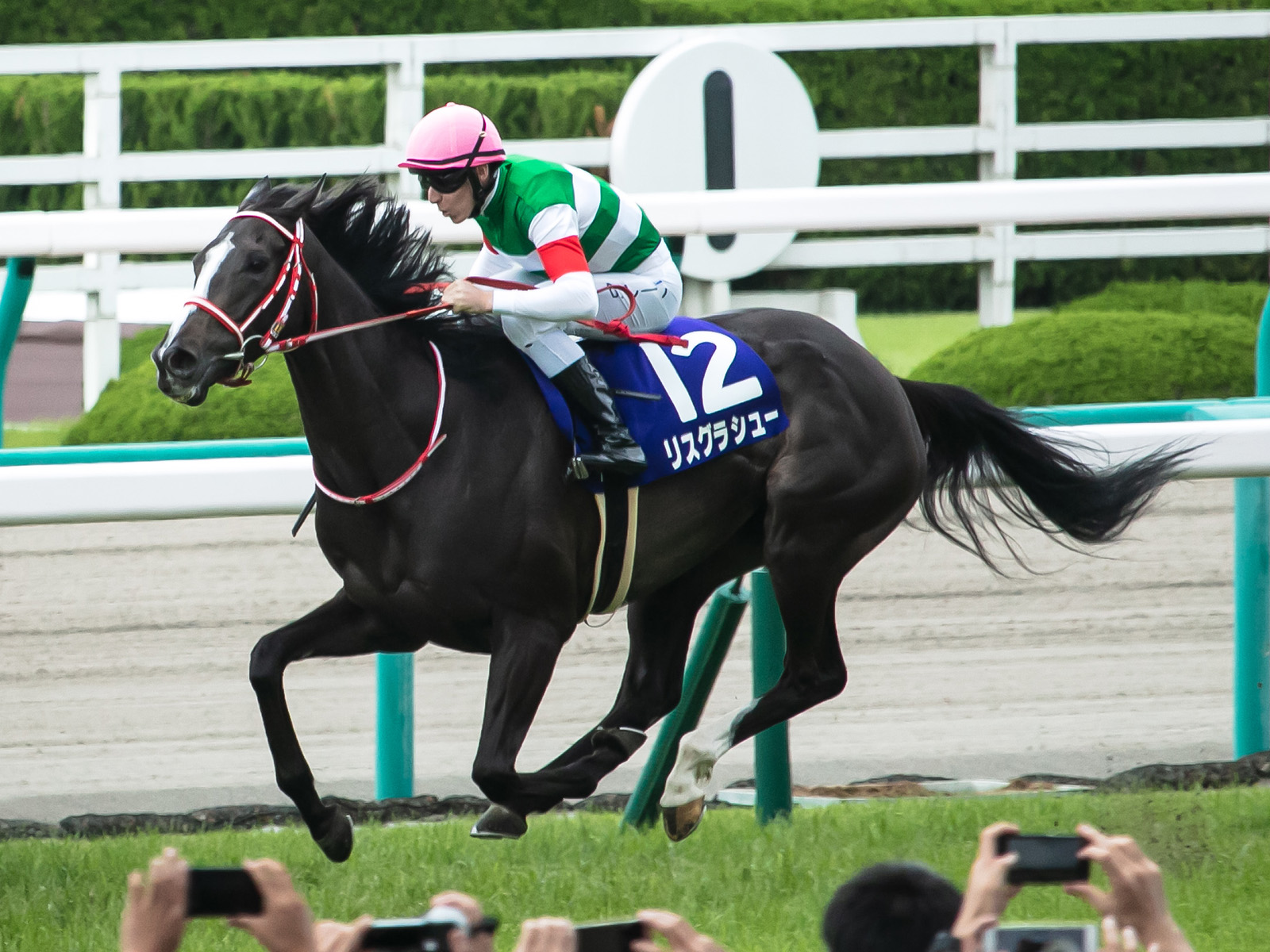
Lys Gracieux

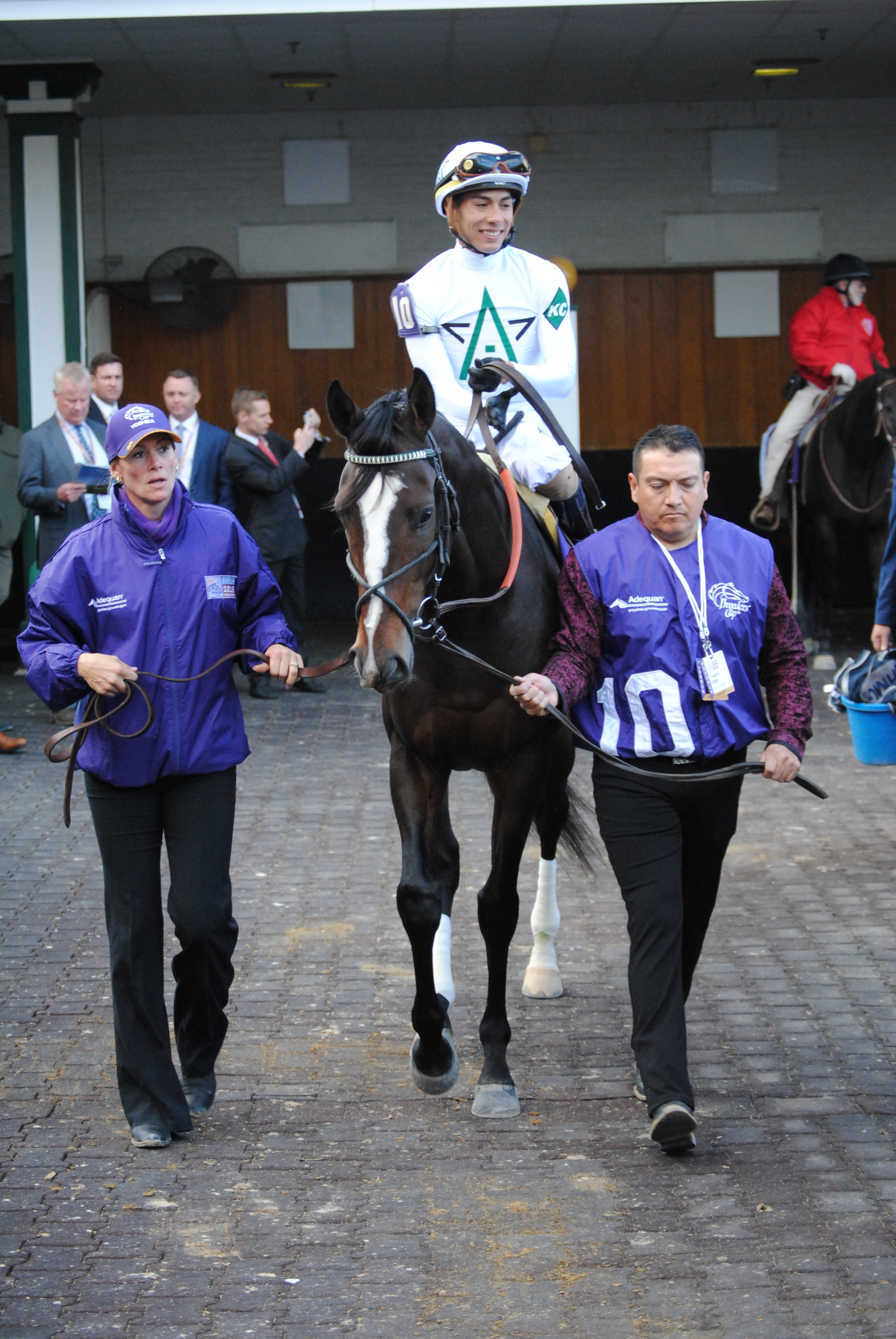
Yoshida

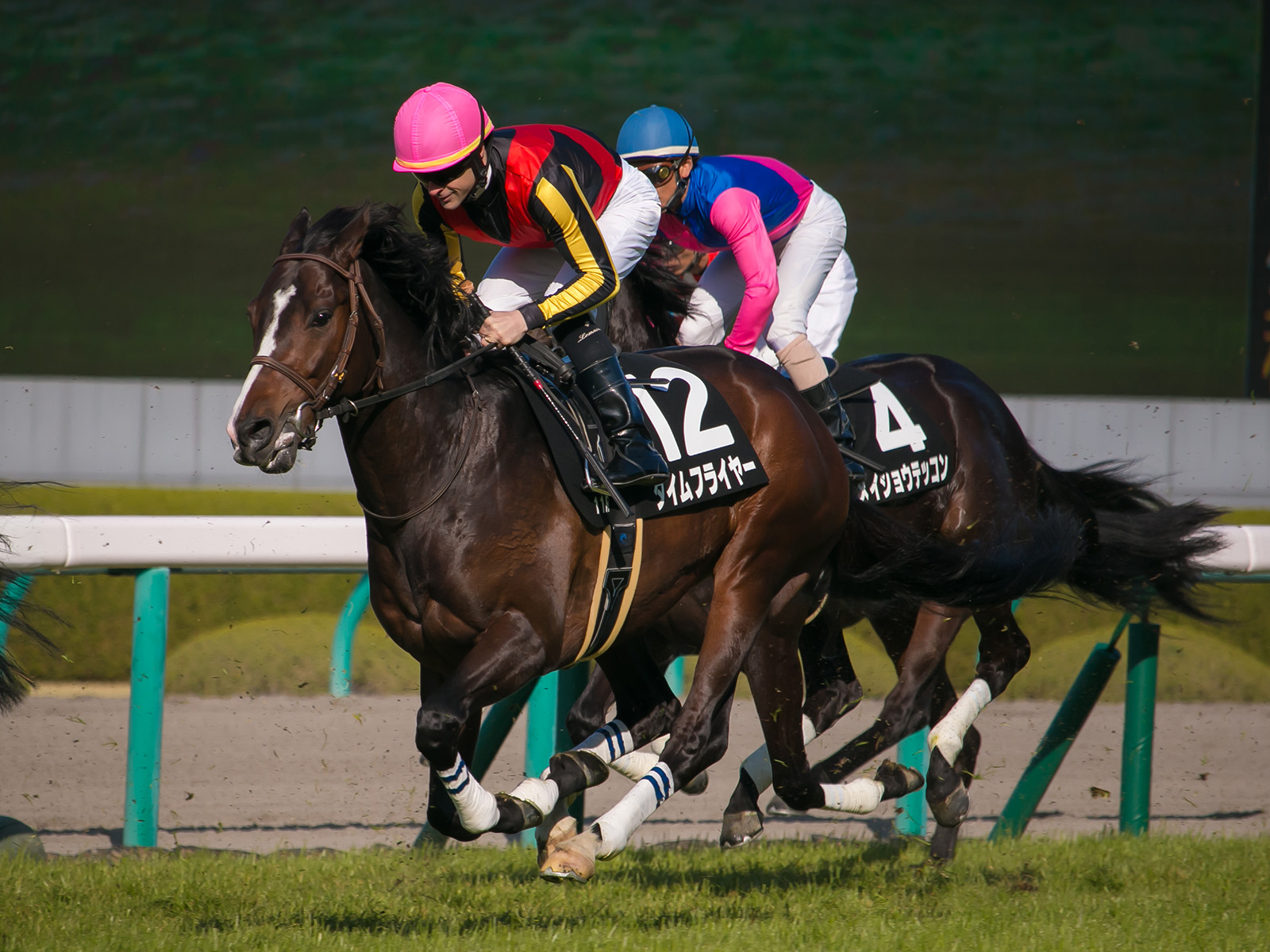
Time Flyer

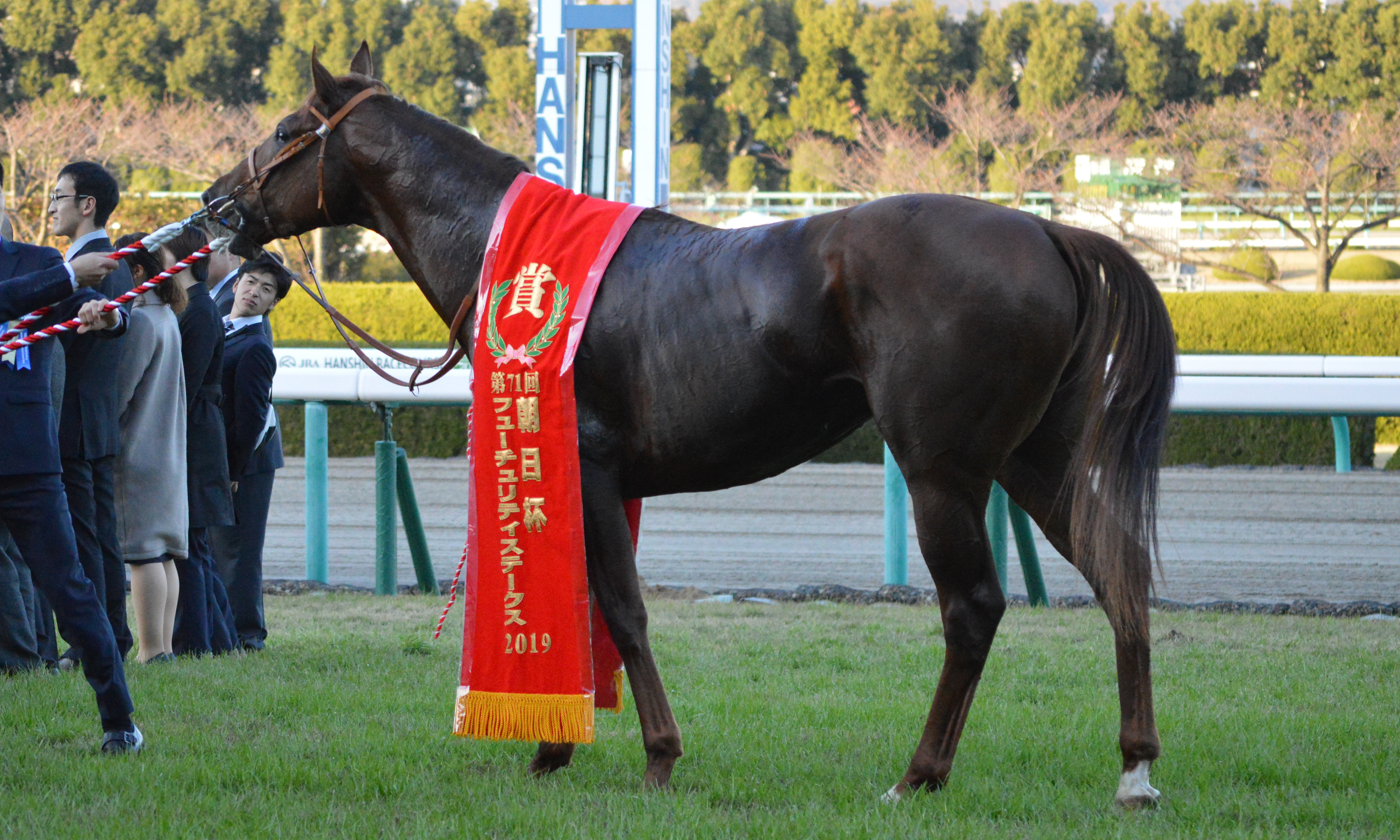
Salios

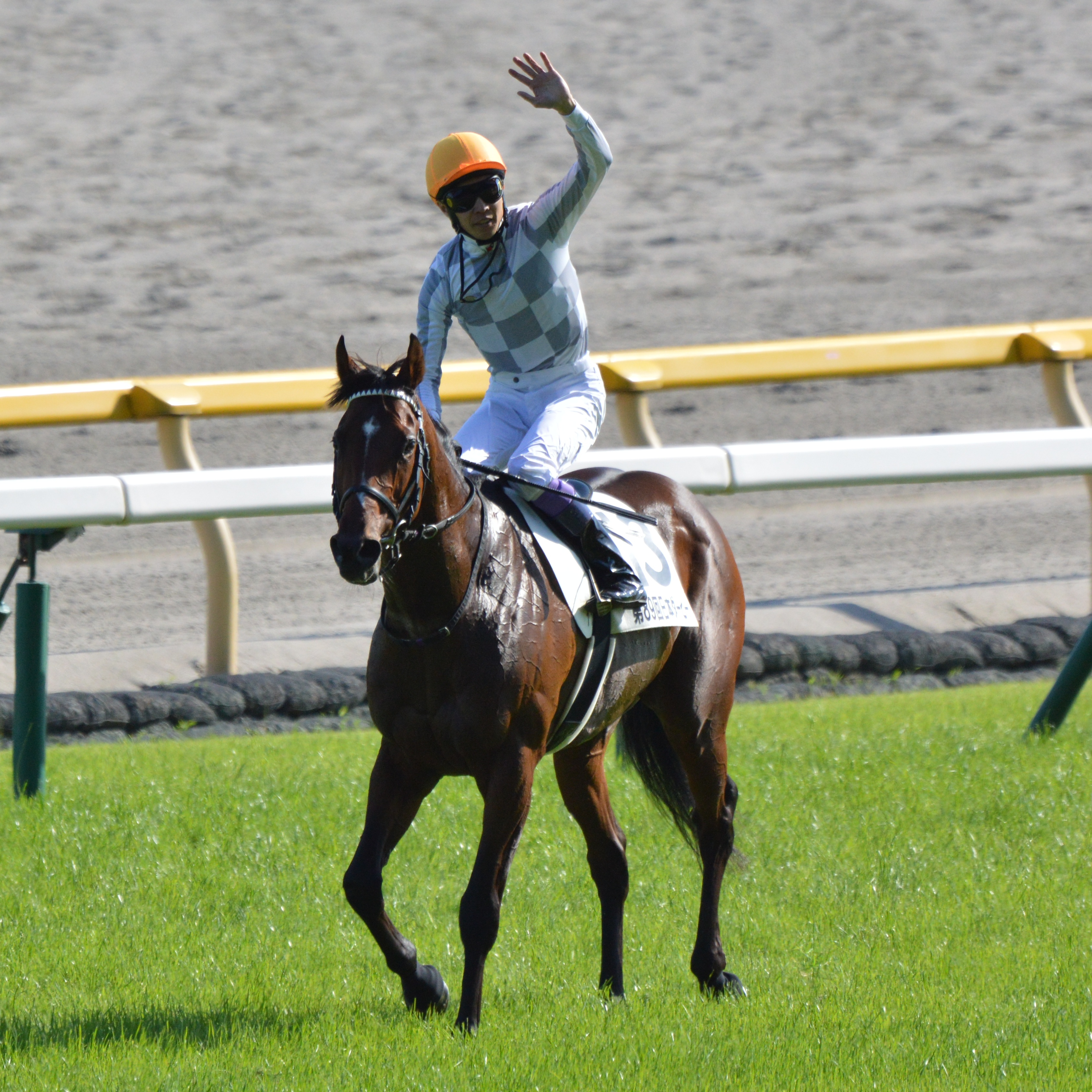
Do Deuce

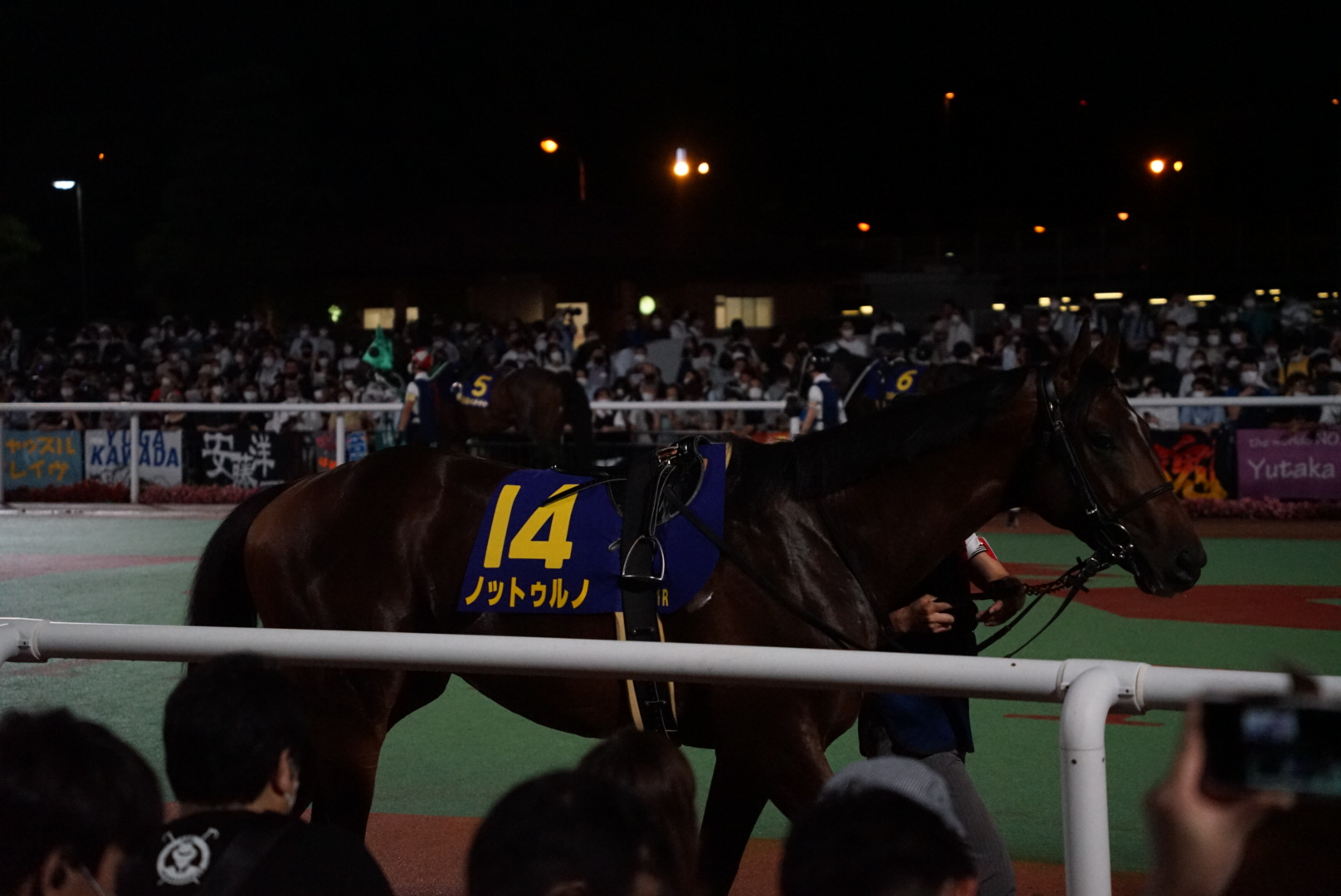
Notturno

== Pedigree ==
Pedigree of Heart's Cry (JPN), bay horse 2001
Sire Sunday Silence (USA) 1986	Halo (USA); 1969	Hail to Reason	Turn-To
Sire Sunday Silence (USA) 1986	Halo (USA); 1969	Hail to Reason	Nothirdchance
Sire Sunday Silence (USA) 1986	Halo (USA); 1969	Cosmah	Cosmic Bomb
Sire Sunday Silence (USA) 1986	Halo (USA); 1969	Cosmah	Almahmoud
Sire Sunday Silence (USA) 1986	Wishing Well (USA); 1975	Understanding	Promised Land
Sire Sunday Silence (USA) 1986	Wishing Well (USA); 1975	Understanding	Pretty Ways
Sire Sunday Silence (USA) 1986	Wishing Well (USA); 1975	Mountain Flower	Montparnasse
Sire Sunday Silence (USA) 1986	Wishing Well (USA); 1975	Mountain Flower	Edel Weiss
Dam Irish Dance (JPN) 1990	Tony Bin (IRE); 1983	Kampala	Kalamoun
Dam Irish Dance (JPN) 1990	Tony Bin (IRE); 1983	Kampala	State Pension
Dam Irish Dance (JPN) 1990	Tony Bin (IRE); 1983	Severn Bridge	Hornbeam
Dam Irish Dance (JPN) 1990	Tony Bin (IRE); 1983	Severn Bridge	Priddy Fair
Dam Irish Dance (JPN) 1990	Buper Dance (USA); 1983	Lyphard	Northern Dancer
Dam Irish Dance (JPN) 1990	Buper Dance (USA); 1983	Lyphard	Goofed
Dam Irish Dance (JPN) 1990	Buper Dance (USA); 1983	My Bupers	Bupers
Dam Irish Dance (JPN) 1990	Buper Dance (USA); 1983	My Bupers	Princess Revoked (Family 6-a)
