= David Junior (horse) =

American-bred Thoroughbred racehorse

- Sire: Pleasant Tap
- Grandsire: Pleasant Colony
- Dam: Paradise River
- Damsire: Irish River
- Sex: Stallion
- Foaled: 18 April 2002
- Country: United States
- Colour: Chestnut
- Breeder: Arthur I. Appleton
- Owner: Roldvale Ltd
- Trainer: Brian Meehan
- Record: 12: 7-1-1
- Earnings: £2,359,960

Major wins
- Gala Stakes (2005); Select Stakes (2005); Champion Stakes (2005); Dubai Duty Free (2006); Eclipse Stakes (2006)
- Last updated on June 22, 2007

David Junior is a retired thoroughbred racehorse and active sire who was bred in the United States but trained in the United Kingdom during his racing career, which lasted from 2004 to 2006. In 2005–06, he won three Group One races and was officially rated the joint-best colt in the world in the 2005-06 World Thoroughbred Racehorse Rankings.

== Background ==
David Junior was bred by Arthur Appleton at the Bridlewood Stud Farm near Ocala, Florida, sired by the Eclipse Award winning stallion Pleasant Tap. His dam, Paradise River was a full sister to the American Turf Champion Paradise Creek. This pedigree suggested a bright future on American tracks, but at the Fasig-Tipton sale at Calder in spring 2004, he was bought for $175,000 by the bloodstock agent Richard Galpin on behalf of the British publisher David Sullivan. Sullivan, who runs his horses under the name of Roldvale Ltd, named the chestnut colt in honour of his son, and sent him into training in England with Brian Meehan. At that time, Meehan was training at Lambourn.

== Racing career ==
=== 2004: Two-year-old season ===
David Junior had a brief two-year-old career, beginning with a third place in a maiden race at Thirsk in September 2004. Two weeks later he appeared in a similar event at Ascot and led from the start to record his first win despite running "green".

=== 2005: Three-year-old season ===
David Junior's 2005 debut brought a significant rise in class, as he was sent straight for the 2,000 Guineas at Newmarket. Starting a complete outsider at 100-1, he finished unplaced, finishing eleventh of the nineteen runners, beaten less than five lengths by Footstepsinthesand. A move up in trip followed in the listed Fairway Stakes at Newmarket, where David Junior took the lead two furlongs out and pulled clear to win by eight lengths from a field that included the future Group One winner Linngari. Less than two weeks later, he appeared in another listed event, the Fink Gala Stakes at Sandown and was "impressive", winning by five lengths despite being eased down in the closing stages. Brought back to a mile (and back up to Group One) he made little impression in the Sussex Stakes, finishing seventh behind Proclamation. He then disappointed when finishing second at odds-on in the Group Three Rose of Lancaster Stakes at Haydock.

At this point, David Junior was rated 115. Ridden for the first time by his new regular jockey, Jamie Spencer, he recorded his first Group race win by taking the Select Stakes at Goodwood by a one and a half lengths despite hanging to the right in the closing stages. He was then stepped back up to the highest level for the Group I Champion Stakes at Newmarket. Starting as a 25-1 outsider, David Junior was held up in the early stages before moving through the field and taking a clear lead a furlong from the finish. He stayed on strongly to win by three quarters of a length from the Cartier Award-winning filly Pride, with major winners such as Rakti, Alexander Goldrun, Alkaased, Oratorio and Maraahel amongst the beaten horses. The surprising nature of the result led to David Junior's win being received with "barely a cheer" from the crowd. Even his trainer, Brian Meehan, seemed to be unprepared for his colt's win and commented, "What can you say? It may be a surprise, but it's now in the form book".

=== 2006: Four-year-old season ===
Rather than being aimed at one of the major races at the end of the calendar year, David Junior was given a winter break, during which time David Sullivan turned down what he described as a "monstrous, monstrous offer" for his horse. In February, he was transferred from Lambourn to Meehan's new base at Manton, Wiltshire.

Less than a month later, the colt was sent to the UAE to prepare for the Dubai Duty Free at Nad Al Sheba. The race attracted a strong international field, with runners from the UAE, the USA (The Tin Man), Hong Kong (Bullish Luck), Australia (Fields of Omagh), South Africa and Japan. David Junior was sent up to take the lead a furlong and a half from home and pulled away to win by three and a half lengths from The Tin Man.

His summer campaign back in England consisted of two races. The field for the Prince of Wales's Stakes at Royal Ascot was exceptionally strong, including the European and North American Champion mare Ouija Board, the Dubai World Cup winner Electrocutionist and the future World Champion Manduro, but David Junior was made the 11-8 favourite. He made a challenge in the straight but hung badly to the right, and despite staying on well, finished only fourth behind Ouija Board.

In the Eclipse Stakes a little over two weeks later David Junior produced his best performance in Europe, despite rumours that he had been working poorly at home. He was held in last place by Jamie Spencer, as the race was led by his stable companion, Royal Alchemist, who had been bought a few days earlier to act as a pacemaker. In the straight, he produced what the BBC's correspondent described as a "dramatic finishing burst" to accelerate past the field and win by a length and a half from Notnowcato, with Ouija Board a further two and a half lengths back in fifth. Meehan commented on the performance by saying, "Today is a great day... he is a seriously good horse".

David Junior did not race for the next four months, despite expectations that he would run in the Irish Champion Stakes in September. In October, it became clear that he would be retired at the end of the season, and it was reported that Sullivan was considering an offer of $8,000,000 for the colt from Japanese breeders, which he eventually accepted.

David Junior's final race was the Breeders' Cup Classic, which ended in disappointment, as he failed to cope with the dirt at Churchill Downs and finished tailed-off behind Invasor.

== Assessment ==
In the 2005 World Thoroughbred Racehorse Rankings, David Junior was assessed at 123, making him the fourteenth best horse in the world, and the world's joint-best performer on turf in the Intermediate division. He repeated his 123 rating and fourteenth place in the rankings for 2006. In the ratings for 2005–06, which excluded most horses trained in North America and Europe, he was placed second, equal with Electrocutionist and Heart's Cry, behind the Australian mare Makybe Diva.

== Stud career ==
On his retirement, David Junior was transferred to Japan for stud duties by his new owners, the Japan Bloodhorse Breeders' Association. He was based for three seasons at the Shizunai Stallion Station before being moved to the Iburi Stallion Station in 2010.

== Pedigree ==
Pedigree of David Junior (USA), chestnut stallion, 2002
Sire Pleasant Tap (USA) 1987	Pleasant Colony; 1978	His Majesty	Ribot
Sire Pleasant Tap (USA) 1987	Pleasant Colony; 1978	His Majesty	Flower Bowl
Sire Pleasant Tap (USA) 1987	Pleasant Colony; 1978	Sun Colony	Sunrise Flight
Sire Pleasant Tap (USA) 1987	Pleasant Colony; 1978	Sun Colony	Colonia
Sire Pleasant Tap (USA) 1987	Never Knock; 1979	Stage Door Johnny	Prince John*
Sire Pleasant Tap (USA) 1987	Never Knock; 1979	Stage Door Johnny	Peroxide Blonde
Sire Pleasant Tap (USA) 1987	Never Knock; 1979	Never Hula	Never Bend*
Sire Pleasant Tap (USA) 1987	Never Knock; 1979	Never Hula	Hula Hula
Dam Paradise River (USA) 1994	Irish River; 1976	Riverman	Never Bend*
Dam Paradise River (USA) 1994	Irish River; 1976	Riverman	River Lady*
Dam Paradise River (USA) 1994	Irish River; 1976	Irish Star	Klairon
Dam Paradise River (USA) 1994	Irish River; 1976	Irish Star	Botany Bay
Dam Paradise River (USA) 1994	North of Eden; 1983	Northfields	Northern Dancer
Dam Paradise River (USA) 1994	North of Eden; 1983	Northfields	Little Hut
Dam Paradise River (USA) 1994	North of Eden; 1983	Tree of Knowledge	Sassafras
Dam Paradise River (USA) 1994	North of Eden; 1983	Tree of Knowledge	Sensibility (Family: 3-h)

* David Junior is inbred 4S x 4D to the stallion Never Bend, meaning that he appears fourth generation on the sire side of his pedigree and fourth generation on the dam side of his pedigree.

* David Junior is inbred 4S x 5D to the stallion Prince John, meaning that he appears fourth generation on the sire side of his pedigree and fifth generation (via River Lady) on the dam side of his pedigree.
