= Phoenix Reach =

Irish-bred Thoroughbred racehorse

- Sire: Alhaarth
- Grandsire: Unfuwain
- Dam: Carroll's Canyon
- Damsire: Hatim
- Sex: Stallion
- Foaled: 5 March 2000
- Country: Ireland
- Colour: Bay
- Breeder: Christine Kiernan
- Owner: Winterbeck Manor Stud
- Trainer: Andrew Balding
- Record: 16: 5-2-1
- Earnings: £1,975,483

Major wins
- Gordon Stakes (2003); Canadian International Stakes (2003); Hong Kong Vase (2004); Dubai Sheema Classic (2005)

Phoenix Reach (foaled 5 March 2000) is an Irish-bred, British-trained retired Thoroughbred racehorse and breeding stallion. Although he never won above Group Three level in Britain he was a highly successful international campaigner, competing in seven different countries and winning major races in Canada, Hong Kong and the United Arab Emirates. As a juvenile in 2002 he finished second on his only start before being sidelined by injury for more than a year. On his return as a three-year-old he won the Gordon Stakes and finished third in the St Leger before winning the Canadian International Stakes. In the following year he was slow to find his best form but thrived when sent to race in East Asia and won the Hong Kong Vase in December. He began his fourth season by winning the Dubai Sheema Classic and finished second in the Singapore Airlines International Cup, but the rest of his career was disrupted by illness and injury. He retired to stud at the end of 2006 and has had modest success as a sire of winners.

== Background ==
Phoenix Reach is a bay horse standing 16.0 hands high with a white blaze bred in the United Kingdom by Christine Kiernan. He was from the second crop of foals sired by the Cartier Champion Two-year-old Colt Alhaarth, whose other progeny have included the 2000 Guineas winner Haafhd. Phoenix Reach's dam Carroll's Canyon was an unraced half-sister to the Prix de l'Arc de Triomphe winner Carroll House.

As a foal, Phoenix Reach was consigned by the Hayesfield Stud Farm to the Goffs sale in November 2000 and was bought for IR£16,000 by John I O'Byrne. The colt was again offered for sale at Doncaster in September 2001 and was sold for 36,000 guineas to Andrew Christou's Winterbeck Manor Stud. In both of the sales, Phoenix Reach was described a being a chestnut although he was subsequently classified as a bay. He was originally sent into training with Ian Balding at Kingsclere in Hampshire, although the trainer passed the stable to his son Andrew Balding in early 2003. Like many Balding-trained horses, Phoenix Reach customarily raced in a sheepskin noseband.

== Racing career ==
=== 2002: two-year-old season ===
On his only appearance as a two-year-old, Phoenix Reach contested a maiden race over seven furlongs at Salisbury Racecourse on 27 June. Ridden by Jimmy Fortune, he took the lead a quarter of a mile from the finish but was caught in the final strides and beaten a head by Norse Dancer. His season was then curtailed by an injury to his left foreleg which necessitated four separate operations under general anaesthetic.

=== 2003: three-year-old season ===
Phoenix Reach was off the track for more than a year before returning in a maiden over one and a half miles at Newbury Racecourse on 3 July 2003. Ridden by Martin Dwyer, who became his regular jockey, he started at odds of 13/2 in a fourteen-runner field. After racing towards the rear of the field he made progress in the straight but was repeatedly blocked as Dwyer attempted to obtain a clear run. He was switched to the outside and finished strongly to take the lead inside the final furlong and win by one and three-quarter lengths from Arresting. At the end of the month the colt was moved up in class to contest the Group Three Gordon Stakes over one and a half miles at Goodwood Racecourse and started at odds of 12/1 in a ten-runner field. Ridden by Darryll Holland he recovered from being hampered in the early stages and took the lead two furlongs out. After being headed by Hawk Flyer he "rallied gamely" to regain the advantage and held off the late challenge of the Predominate Stakes winner High Accolade to win by a short head.

After a six-week break, Phoenix Reach returned for the 227th running St Leger Stakes at Doncaster Racecourse in September. With Holland again in the saddle he started alongside High Accolade at odds of 8/1, making him the joint-fourth favourite behind Brian Boru, Westmoreland Road and the unbeaten filly Moments of Joy. After tracking the leaders he attempted to make a forward run in the straight but never looked likely to win and finished third behind Brian Boru and High Accolade, beaten two and three quarter lengths by the winner. Phoenix Reach was matched against older horses for the first time when he was sent to Toronto for the 66th edition of the Canadian International Stakes at Woodbine Racetrack and started 5.4/1 second favourite behind Brian Boru. The other leading contenders included the Man o' War Stakes winner Lunar Sovereign and the German horse Sabiango, winner of the Grosser Preis von Bayern and Grosser Preis von Berlin. Dywer sent the colt (who was wearing blinkers for the first time) into the lead soon after the start and set the pace before being overtaken by Shoal Water after half a mile. He then settled behind the leaders and turned into the straight in fifth place before launching his challenge on the inside. He overtook the leader Bowman Mill a furlong out and held off late challenges from Macaw and Brian Boru to win by three quarters of a length and a head. Commenting on his achievement of training a major international winner in his first season, Andrew Balding said; "I've been very lucky. I've taken over a yard full of talented horses and good staff. I'm very thrilled today. I was a little bit concerned early on. We work him a lot in a visor (blinkers) at home. He's quite an idle horse at home. It certainly set him alight early on. I was just worried if he'd get the trip, running that keenly. But Martin did a great job. We dropped him back from a mile and six in the St. Leger to a mile and a half, which is his trip, really. The horse has got a lot of speed, a good turn of foot and it wouldn't surprise me if he went a good race over 10 furlongs one day."

=== 2004: four-year-old season ===
Phoenix Reach had no success in Europe as a four-year-old in 2004, when his preparation was disrupted by a viral infection early in the year. His first appearance was delaye until June when he finished sixth to Rakti in the Prince of Wales's Stakes. After finishing sixth in the Grand Prix de Saint-Cloud he started a 33/1 outsider for the King George VI and Queen Elizabeth Stakes and finished tenth of the eleven runners behind Doyen.

After a break of more than four months, Phoenix Reach was sent to the Far East for two races, beginning with the Japan Cup at Tokyo Racecourse on 28 November for which he started a 46/1 outsider. Ridden by Dwyer he was always in touch with the leaders and kept on in the straight to finish sixth of the sixteen runners behind Zenno Rob Roy. Two weeks later the colt started at odds of 27/1 for the eleventh running of the Hong Kong Vase at Sha Tin Racecourse. The race attracted an international field including Vallee Enchantee (winner of the race in 2003), Sweet Stream (Prix Vermeille) and Polish Summer (Sheema Classic) from France, Warrsan from England, Brian Boru from Ireland, Simonas from Germany and the Godolphin runner Sights On Gold. The local runners were headed by the New Zealand-bred Super Kid, winner of the Hong Kong Champions & Chater Cup. There was a delay before the start as Phoenix Reach's bridle broke and a replacement was found and fitted. Dwyer tracked the leaders in a slowly-run before turning into the straight in third place behind Beethoven and Warrsan. Phoenix Reach took the lead 300 metres from the finish and was driven out by Dwyer to win by half a length from Sights On Gold with Vallee Enchantee a length and a half away in third ahead of Sweet Stream and Super Kid.

=== 2005: five-year-old season ===
For his first appearance of 2005, Phoenix Reach was sent to the United Arab Emirates for the Dubai Sheema Classic at Nad Al Sheba Racecourse on 26 March. He started the 5/1 fourth favourite behind the Arc de Triomphe winner Cherry Mix, running for Godolphin, he South African challenger Greys Inn winner of the Durban July and Dubai City of Gold, and Powerscourt the disqualified "winner" of the 2004 Arlington Million, with the other runners including Collier Hill, Prince Arch (Gulfstream Park Turf Handicap) and Maraahel (Gordon Stakes). The horse's owner, Andrew Christou, a keen believer in faith healing and astrology had a dream before the race which led him to believe that Phoenix Reach would win if Christou touched the belly of a pregnant woman: the Channel 4 presenter Alice Fox-Pitt was the recipient of this supposedly lucky touch. Drawn on the far outside of the eleven runner field, Phoenix Reach started slowly with Dwyer moving left to race along the rails at the back of the field in the early stages. He was in tenth place on the final turn but accelerated through the field to catch the leader Razkalla inside the final furlong and drew away to win by two lengths with Collier Hill taking third place ahead of Greys Inn, Powerscourt and Prince Arch. After the race Balding said, "Martin has given him a great ride and perhaps now the horse will get the credit he deserves. For some reason people keep underestimating him but he keeps on winning and running with great credit. He is a great horse and a real star". Following the race he underwent an operation to treat an ulcer on his cornea.

In April, Phoenix Reach was back in Hong Kong for the Queen Elizabeth II Cup. Racing over ten furlongs for the first time since June 2004, he finished fifth of the thirteen runners behind Vengeance of Rain, Greys Inn, Russian Pearl and Super Kid with the other beaten runners including Bullish Luck, Elvstroem and Grand Armee. The horse's next port of call was Singapore, where he contested the Singapore Airlines International Cup at Kranji Racecourse on 15 May and started 4/1 joint-favourite with the Irish mare Alexander Goldrun just ahead of the Dubai Duty Free winner Right Approach. After racing in sixth place, Phoenix Reach moved forward in the straight and took the lead a furlong and a half out but was caught in the closing stages and beaten three quarters of a length by the Australian gelding Mummify.

In July, Phoenix Reach returned to Europe for his second attempt at the King George VI and Queen Elizabeth Stakes run that year at Newbury. His preparation for the race had been interrupted by treatment for an impacted colon, which, according to Balding "knocked the stuffing out of him". He made no impression, finishing tenth of the eleven runners behind Azamour. A month later he was found to have sustained a hairline fracture to his right foreleg in a training gallop and was ruled out for the rest of the year.

=== 2006: six-year-old season ===
Phoenix Reach remained in training as a six-year-old but failed to reproduce his best form. On his first appearance for over a year he ran in the Arlington Million in Chicago on 12 August but finished last of the eleven runners behind The Tin Man. On his return to Europe hee was dropped from Group One class for the first time in three year for the Group Three Arc Trial at Newbury on 15 September. He pulled hard in the early stages before taking the lead half a mile out, but weakened in the closing stages to finish eighth of the nine runners behind Blue Monday.

== Assessment ==
In the first edition of the World Thoroughbred Racehorse Rankings in 2004, Phoenix Reach was rated the 104th best racehorse in the world, fifteen pounds behind the top-rated Ghostzapper. In the 2004–05 World Thoroughbred Racehorse Rankings he was ranked equal-fifteenth, eight pounds behind Roses In May. In the end-of-year rankings for 2005 he was placed eighty-ninth, fourteen pounds inferior to Hurricane Run.

== Stud record ==
Phoenix Reach retired from racing to become a breeding stallion at the National Stud, before moving to the Mickley Stud in Shropshire in 2012. By far the best of his offspring to date has been Elm Park, a colt who won the Royal Lodge Stakes and the Racing Post Trophy in 2014. His fee for the 2015 covering season is £5,000.

== Pedigree ==
Pedigree of Phoenix Reach (IRE), bay stallion, 2000
Sire Alhaarth (IRE) 1993	Unfuwain (USA); 1985	Northern Dancer	Nearctic
Sire Alhaarth (IRE) 1993	Unfuwain (USA); 1985	Northern Dancer	Natalma
Sire Alhaarth (IRE) 1993	Unfuwain (USA); 1985	Height of Fashion	Bustino
Sire Alhaarth (IRE) 1993	Unfuwain (USA); 1985	Height of Fashion	Highclere
Sire Alhaarth (IRE) 1993	Irish Valley (USA); 1982	Irish River	Riverman
Sire Alhaarth (IRE) 1993	Irish Valley (USA); 1982	Irish River	Irish Star
Sire Alhaarth (IRE) 1993	Irish Valley (USA); 1982	Green Valley	Val de Loir
Sire Alhaarth (IRE) 1993	Irish Valley (USA); 1982	Green Valley	Sly Pola
Dam Carroll's Canyon (IRE) 1989	Hatim (USA); 1981	Exclusive Native	Raise a Native
Dam Carroll's Canyon (IRE) 1989	Hatim (USA); 1981	Exclusive Native	Exclusive
Dam Carroll's Canyon (IRE) 1989	Hatim (USA); 1981	Sunday Purchase	T V Lark
Dam Carroll's Canyon (IRE) 1989	Hatim (USA); 1981	Sunday Purchase	Dame Fritchie
Dam Carroll's Canyon (IRE) 1989	Tuna (GB); 1969	Silver Shark	Buisson Ardent
Dam Carroll's Canyon (IRE) 1989	Tuna (GB); 1969	Silver Shark	Palsaka
Dam Carroll's Canyon (IRE) 1989	Tuna (GB); 1969	Vimelette	Vimy
Dam Carroll's Canyon (IRE) 1989	Tuna (GB); 1969	Vimelette	Sea Parrot (Family: 14-c)
