= Alkaased =

American-bred Thoroughbred racehorse

- Sire: Kingmambo
- Grandsire: Mr. Prospector
- Dam: Chesa Palana
- Damsire: Niniski
- Sex: Stallion
- Foaled: 19 February 2000
- Country: United States
- Colour: Bay
- Breeder: Clovelly Farms
- Owner: Hamdan Al Maktoum; Michael Charlton
- Trainer: Michael Stoute; Luca Cumani
- Record: 16:6-7-0
- Earnings: £1,672,130

Major wins
- Old Newton Cup (2004); Glorious Stakes (2004); Jockey Club Stakes (2005); Grand Prix de Saint-Cloud (2005); Japan Cup (2005)

Alkaased (foaled 19 February 2000) is an American-bred, British-trained Thoroughbred racehorse best known for winning the 2005 Japan Cup in a then world record time. In a racing career which lasted from September 2002 until November 2005, he won six of his sixteen races and finished second on seven occasions. In his first three seasons he made steady improvement, winning the Old Newton Cup and the Glorious Stakes in 2004. In the following year he developed into a world-class middle-distance performer, winning the Jockey Club Stakes in England and the Grand Prix de Saint-Cloud in France before beating a strong international field in the Japan Cup. After his retirement from racing he has stood as a breeding stallion in Japan and England.

== Background ==
Alkaased is a bay horse with no white markings bred by Robin Scully's Clovelly Farms at Lexington, Kentucky. Alkaased's sire, Kingmambo was a highly successful breeding stallion. His progeny included the British Classic winners Russian Rhythm, King's Best, Henrythenavigator, Virginia Waters and Rule of Law as well as major winners in Japan (El Condor Pasa), France (Divine Proportions) and the United States (Lemon Drop Kid). Alkaased's dam Chesa Plana raced in Germany where she finished second in five Group races including the Grosser Preis von Berlin. As a descendant of the broodmare Mesopatamia, she came from the same branch of Thoroughbred family 10-c which produced Mastery, Galaxy Libra (Sunset Handicap, Man o' War Stakes), Halling, Cherokee Rose (Haydock Sprint Cup, Prix Maurice de Gheest) and Balla Cove (Middle Park Stakes, Round Table Handicap).

As a yearling, Alkaased was sent to the Keeneland sales in September 2001 where he was bought for $325,000 by Hamdan Al Maktoum's Shadwell Estates. He was sent to race in England where he was trained by Michael Stoute at Newmarket, Suffolk.

== Racing career ==
=== 2002: two-year-old season ===
Alkaased began his racing career at Doncaster Racecourse on 11 September 2002 when he finished fourth behind the odd-on favourite Maghanim. In the following month he started favourite for a one-mile maiden race at Newmarket Racecourse and finished fourth of the sixteen runners behind Persian Majesty.

=== 2003: three-year-old season ===
Alkaased did not appear in 2003 until July, when he finished second in a maiden race at Yarmouth. On 25 August he started the 1/8 favourite for a maiden race over one and a half miles at Ripon Racecourse. Ridden by Willie Supple, he recorded his first success, taking the lead half a mile from the finish and winning by four lengths despite being eased down in the closing stages. In his two remaining races of the season, Alkaased finished second when carrying top weight in handicap races at Newmarket and Leicester.

At the end of October, Alkaased was sent to the Tattersalls Horses in Training sale where he was bought for 42,000 guineas by Foster Bloodstock. The colt entered the ownership of the Monte Carlo-based businessman Michael Charlton and was transferred to the stable of Luca Cumani.

=== 2004: four-year-old season ===
On his first appearance for his new connections, Alkaased finished second by a head to Wunderwood in a race over one and a half miles at Newmarket on 5 June. Four weeks later, the colt carried 127 pounds and started at odds of 7/1 for the Old Newton Cup, a one and a half mile handicap at Haydock Park Racecourse. Ridden by Jimmy Fortune, he took the lead a quarter of a mile from the finish and drew clear of his rivals to win by four lengths. On 30 July, Alkaased was moved up in class to contest the Listed Glorious Stakes at Goodwood Racecourse and was made the 11/4 favourite against eight opponents. He took the lead approaching the final furlong and ran on strongly to win by a neck from the Stoute-trained First Charter. Alkaased was moved up to Group race class for the first time when he contested the September Stakes at Kempton Park Racecourse. He started the 6/4 favourite, but was beaten half a length by the dual Group One winner Mamool, with Bandari in third place.

=== 2005: five-year-old season ===
Alkaased recorded his first Group race win on his five-year-old debut at Newmarket on 1 May. Starting the 2/1 favourite, he won the Jockey Club Stakes, beating Gamut by one and a half lengths, with Bandari third and Warrsan fourth. A month later, Alkaased moved up to Group One level for the first time and started favourite for the Coronation Cup at Epsom Downs Racecourse. He was restrained in last by Fortune in the early stages and by the time he moved into contention in the straight Yeats had already established a decisive lead. Alkaased finished second, beaten two and a half lengths by the Irish colt: Fortune never rode the horse again. Three weeks later, Alkaased raced outside the United Kingdom for the first time when he was sent to France to contest the Grand Prix de Saint-Cloud. Ridden by Frankie Dettori he started at odds of 6/1 in a field of eleven which included Yeats, Bago, and Elvstroem. Dettori held up Alkaased towards the back of the field before moving up on the inside rail to take second place entering the straight. He overtook the pacemaker Imago Mundi 300 metres from the finish and went clear to win by two lengths from Policy Maker, with Bago finishing third ahead of Elvstroem. After the race, Luca Cumani said "We are already thinking about the Arc de Triomphe with a run before in the Prix Foy. We will have to think about the King George now and I will be speaking with the owner but he is a horse that must have good or firmer ground to show his best".

As Cumani had suggested, Alkaased returned to France in September and started odds-on favourite of the Prix Foy at Longchamp, a major trial race for the Prix de l'Arc de Triomphe. Ridden by Kieren Fallon, he was held up as usual before making his challenge in the straight. He moved into second place 300 metres from the finish but was unable to make further progress and was beaten two and a half lengths by the mare Pride, with the German-bred Shirocco in third. Alkaased was brought back in distance for the Champion Stakes over ten furlongs at Newmarket and finished fifth of fifteen runners behind David Junior, Pride, Maraahel and Oratorio. The unplaced horses included Rakti, Chic and Alexander Goldrun.

On 27 November, Alkaased was one of eighteen horses to contest the twenty-fifth running of the Japan Cup at Tokyo Racecourse. The other European runners included Ouija Board, Bago and Warrsan, whilst North America was represented the Breeders' Cup Turf winner Better Talk Now and the Sword Dancer Invitational Handicap winner King's Drama. The locally trained runners included the last two winners of the race Tap Dance City and Zenno Rob Roy, the Tenno Sho winners Heavenly Romance and Suzuka Mambo as well as the NAR champion Cosmo Bulk. Ridden by Dettori he started the 9.6/1 third choice in the betting for a race run on unusually firm ground. Alkaased lost ground at the start as Dettori, on instructions from Cumani, tracked across from a wide draw to race on the inside. He raced in twelfth place before moving up to fifth place on the turn into the straight. Tap Dance City attempted to make all the running, as he had done in 2003 and was still four lengths clear with 400 metres to run but was overtaken by Alkaased and Zenno Rob Roy 200 metres from the finish. Alkaased gained the advantage and held off the late challenge of Heart's Cry on the inside to win by a nose, with Zenno Rob Roy one and three quarter lengths back in third ahead of Lincoln and Ouija Board. The winning time of 2:22.1 was a new world record for 2400 metres on turf, bettering the mark set by Horlicks in the 1989 running of the race, that time would be smashed twice by Japan Star Almond Eye in 2018 (2:20.6) and Irish Born-French trained Calandagan in 2025 (2:20.3). Equinox in 2023 (2:21.8) would also best Alkaased's time as well, however it didn't beat Almond Eye's time so isn't counted. Dettori, who was winning the race for the third time said; "Alkaased is a great horse to ride. He can be lazy but he's a very tenacious, tough horse – he kept finding a little more". Mike Charlton admitted that when he bought the horse he had regarded him as just a good handicapper, saying; "I did think he would improve, but this was a million-to-one shot". Alkaased would be the last foreign race horse to win the Japan Cup until 20 years later in 2025 when Irish Born-French Trained Calandagan won the 45th running against a tougher field due to the increased quality of Japanese Race Horses.

== Stud record ==
After his win in the Japan Cup, Alkaased was sold for a reported $7.4 million and stood as a breeding stallion Sheikh Mohammed's Darley Stud at an initial fee of $20,700. In 2012, Alkaased returned to Europe and has been based since then at the Kelanne Stud in Hampshire, standing at a fee of £1,500 in 2014.

== Pedigree ==
Pedigree of Alkaased (USA), bay stallion, 2000
Sire Kingmambo (USA) 1990	Mr. Prospector (USA); 1970	Raise a Native	Native Dancer
Sire Kingmambo (USA) 1990	Mr. Prospector (USA); 1970	Raise a Native	Raise You
Sire Kingmambo (USA) 1990	Mr. Prospector (USA); 1970	Gold Digger	Nashua
Sire Kingmambo (USA) 1990	Mr. Prospector (USA); 1970	Gold Digger	Sequence
Sire Kingmambo (USA) 1990	Miesque (USA); 1984	Nureyev	Northern Dancer
Sire Kingmambo (USA) 1990	Miesque (USA); 1984	Nureyev	Special
Sire Kingmambo (USA) 1990	Miesque (USA); 1984	Pasadoble	Prove Out
Sire Kingmambo (USA) 1990	Miesque (USA); 1984	Pasadoble	Santa Quilla
Dam Chesa Plana (GB) 1989	Niniski (USA); 1976	Nijinsky	Northern Dancer
Dam Chesa Plana (GB) 1989	Niniski (USA); 1976	Nijinsky	Flaming Page
Dam Chesa Plana (GB) 1989	Niniski (USA); 1976	Virginia Hills	Tom Rolfe
Dam Chesa Plana (GB) 1989	Niniski (USA); 1976	Virginia Hills	Ridin' Easy
Dam Chesa Plana (GB) 1989	Top of the League (IRE); 1982	High Top	Derring-Do
Dam Chesa Plana (GB) 1989	Top of the League (IRE); 1982	High Top	Camenae
Dam Chesa Plana (GB) 1989	Top of the League (IRE); 1982	Home and Away	Home Guard
Dam Chesa Plana (GB) 1989	Top of the League (IRE); 1982	Home and Away	Garden of Eden (Family: 10-c)

- Alkaased was inbred 4 x 4 to Northern Dancer, meaning that this stallion appears twice in the fourth generation of his pedigree.
