= Oratorio (horse) =

Irish-bred Thoroughbred racehorse

- Racing colours of Susan Magnier
- Sire: Danehill
- Grandsire: Danzig
- Dam: Mahrah
- Damsire: Vaguely Noble
- Sex: Stallion
- Foaled: 29 April 2002
- Country: Ireland
- Colour: Bay
- Breeder: Barronstown Stud and Orpendale
- Owner: Susan Magnier and Michael Tabor
- Trainer: Aidan O'Brien
- Record: 15: 6-3-1
- Earnings: £1.085,278

Major wins
- Anglesey Stakes (2004); Futurity Stakes (2004); Prix Jean-Luc Lagardère (2004); Eclipse Stakes (2005); Irish Champion Stakes (2005)

Oratorio (foaled 29 April 2002) is an Irish Thoroughbred racehorse and sire. As a two-year-old in 2004 he won four of his seven races including the Anglesey Stakes, Futurity Stakes and Prix Jean-Luc Lagardère as well as finishing second in the Phoenix Stakes and the Dewhurst Stakes. He showed his best form when tried over a mile and a quarter in 2005, when he defeated strong international fields in the Eclipse Stakes and the Irish Champion Stakes, beating The Derby winner Motivator on both occasions. He was retired to stud at the end of 2005 and has had some success as a sire of winners.

== Background ==
Oratorio is a good-looking bay horse with a small white star and three white socks bred jointly by the County Wicklow-based Barronstown Stud and Orpendale, a breeding organisation associated with John Magnier's Coolmore Stud.

Oratorio's sire Danehill (who died in 2003) was one of the most successful stallions of the last twenty years, producing the winners of more than a thousand races, including one hundred and fifty-six at Group One/Grade I level. Among his best offspring are Duke of Marmalade, Dylan Thomas, Rock of Gibraltar, George Washington and North Light. His dam, Mahrah, was a moderate racehorse who won one minor race from six starts before being retired to the breeding paddocks. She was a granddaughter of Katonka, who was a full-sister to the dam of the Preakness Stakes winner Codex. Apart from Oratorio, her best runners has been Fahim, who finished second to Awad in the Sword Dancer Invitational Handicap.

Like many Coolmore horses, the details of Oratorio's ownership varied from race to race: he was sometimes listed as being owned by Susan Magnier, while in other races he was listed as the property of a partnership of Magnier and Michael Tabor. The colt was trained throughout his racing career by Aidan O'Brien at Ballydoyle.

== Racing career ==
=== 2004: two-year-old season ===
Oratorio made his debut in a six furlong maiden race at the Curragh on 24 May. Ridden by Jamie Spencer, he started the 4/5 favourite and won very easily by two and a half lengths from six opponents. The colt was then moved up sharply in class for the Group 2 Coventry Stakes at Royal Ascot in June, where he made little impression, finishing seventh of the thirteen runners behind Iceman. Oratorio returned to the Curragh for the Group 3 Anglesey Stakes over six and a half furlongs on 18 July. Ridden by Seamie Heffernan, he recorded his first important success as he took the lead two furlongs from the finish and won by a length from his better fancied stable companion Cougar Cat.

Oratorio was moved up to Group 1 level for the Phoenix Stakes at the Curragh in August and finished second the filly Damson, who had been made the odds-on favourite. Two weeks later he moved up in distance for the Group 2 Futurity Stakes over seven furlongs. Spencer settled the colt in second place before taking the lead approaching the last quarter mile. Oratorio won by two lengths from Democratic Deficit, with Spencer easing the colt down in the final strides for an impressive win.

The remainder of Oratorio's racing career was conducted exclusively at Group 1 level. In October he was sent to France to contest the Prix Jean-Luc Lagardère over 1400 metres at Longchamp Racecourse. Spencer produced the 5/2 second favourite with a strong challenge in the straight, taking the lead in the closing stages and winning in a three-way photo-finish from the French colts Early March and Layman. Having won the most prestigious French event for two-year-old colts, Oratorio was sent to Newmarket Racecourse two weeks later for Britain's most important juvenile race, the Dewhurst Stakes over seven furlongs. He started at odds of 15/2 and finished second of the nine runners behind the Mark Johnston-trained Shamardal, beaten two and a half lengths.

=== 2005: three-year-old season ===
==== Spring ====
Oratorio made his three-year-old debut in the 197th running of the 2000 Guineas over Newmarket's Rowley Mile course on 30 April, starting at odds of 8/1 in a field of nineteen runners. Ridden by Johnny Murtagh, the colt was unable to obtain a clear run inside the last quarter mile but made progress in the closing stages to finish fourth behind his stable companion Footstepsinthesand. Three weeks later, he started 7/4 joint favourite for the Irish 2000 Guineas at the Curragh and finished second to his betting rival Dubawi, six lengths clear of the rest of the field. In this race, he was ridden for the first time by Kieren Fallon, who became his regular jockey.

==== Summer ====
On 4 June, Oratorio was moved up in distance when he was one of four O'Brien-trained colts to contest the 226th running of the Derby Stakes over one and a half miles at Epsom Downs Racecourse. He started the 8/1 fourth favourite, but was never in contention and finished tenth of the thirteen runners, twenty-five lengths behind the winner Motivator. Oratorio was brought back in distance for the one mile St. James's Palace Stakes which, with Ascot Racecourse being closed for redevelopment, was run at York. Ridden by Fallon, he finished third of the eight runners behind Shamardal and Ad Valorem. Oratorio raced over ten furlongs for the first time in the Eclipse Stakes at Sandown Park Racecourse on 2 July, when he was tested against older horses. The betting was dominated by Motivator, who started the 2/5 favourite, with his most serious opposition appearing to come from the New Zealand-bred five-year-old Starcraft. Fallon positioned Oratorio in third place as the lead was disputed by Motivator and Diomed Stakes winner Hazyview. In the straight. Motivator went two lengths clear, but Fallon produced Oratorio with a strong late challenge to catch the Derby winner 75 yards from the finish and win by half a length. Commenting the colt's improved performance, O'Brien explained "the horse has taken a long time to get here because he is unbelievably calm. All he does is eat and sleep at home but racing is bringing him on. We would run him every week if we could. His run in the Derby was just a mystery. He just wasn't right." Fallon, who received a two-day ban for improper use of the whip on the winner said "I wasn't worried about the favourite. I thought if this guy gives me his best he can win," and also pointed out that the colt was very well suited by the course and distance.

==== Autumn ====
Oratorio and Motivator met for the third time in the Irish Champion Stakes over ten furlongs at Leopardstown Racecourse on 10 September, when the field also included the King George VI and Queen Elizabeth Stakes winner Azamour, the Irish Derby winner Grey Swallow and the leading racemare Alexander Goldrun. Fallon held the colt up towards the rear of the field before moving up to second place behind Motivator early in the straight. He repeated his performance from the Eclipse by overtaking the English-trained colt in the closing stages to win by half a length, with Alexander Goldrun in third and the favourite Azamour in fifth.

In the Champion Stakes at Newmarket in October, Oratorio was made favourite for the first time over a year when he started at odds of 9/4 in a field which included Alexander Goldrun, Alkaased, Rakti, Pride, Maraahel, Chic and David Junior. Fallon positioned the colt just behind the leaders but was unable to obtain a clear run and was forced to switch to the right inside the final furlong. Oratorio made ground in the closing stages but finished fourth of the fifteen runners, three and a quarter lengths behind David Junior. At the end of the month, Oratorio was sent to the United States to contest the Breeders' Cup Classic at Belmont Park. Running on dirt for the first time he was never able to challenge the leaders and finished eleventh of the thirteen runners behind Saint Liam.

== Assessment ==
In the 2005 World Thoroughbred Racehorse Rankings, Oratorio was assessed at 123, making him the fourteenth best horse in the world, and the world's joint-best performer on turf in the Intermediate division.

== Stud record ==
On his retirement from racing, Oratorio became a breeding stallion for the Coolmore Stud. He has been based in Ireland and was shuttled to Australia for the Southern Hemisphere breeding season. Oratorio made a very promising start to his stud career, when two colts from his first crop of foals finished first and second in the 2009 Dewhurst Stakes. The best of his progeny to date include:

- Beethoven (bay colt 2007), won Dewhurst Stakes, Desmond Stakes
- Lolly for Dolly (bay filly 2007), won Windsor Forest Stakes
- Torio's Quest (bay gelding 2007), won Queensland Guineas
- Military Attack (bay gelding 2008), won Hong Kong Gold Cup, Queen Elizabeth II Cup, Singapore Airlines International Cup
- Manawanui (bay gelding 2008), won Golden Rose Stakes, Stan Fox Stakes
- Moonwalk in Paris (bay gelding 2008), won Prix Edmond Blanc
- Temida (bay filly 2008), won Rheinland-Pokal
- Conditions Apply (bay gelding 2008), raced but never placed.
- Cherry Collect (bay filly 2009), won Oaks d'Italia
- Biz the Nurse (bay colt 2010), won Derby Italiano, Gran Premio di Milano

In August 2012 Oratorio was sold by Coolmore to the Avontuur Stud and moved to South Africa in 2013.

== Pedigree ==
Pedigree of Oratorio (IRE), bay stallion, 2002
Sire Danehill (USA) 1986	Danzig (USA); 1977	Northern Dancer	Nearctic
Sire Danehill (USA) 1986	Danzig (USA); 1977	Northern Dancer	Natalma*
Sire Danehill (USA) 1986	Danzig (USA); 1977	Pas de Nom	Admiral's Voyage
Sire Danehill (USA) 1986	Danzig (USA); 1977	Pas de Nom	Petitioner
Sire Danehill (USA) 1986	Rayzana (USA); 1981	His Majesty	Ribot
Sire Danehill (USA) 1986	Rayzana (USA); 1981	His Majesty	Flower Bowl
Sire Danehill (USA) 1986	Rayzana (USA); 1981	Spring Adieu	Buckpasser
Sire Danehill (USA) 1986	Rayzana (USA); 1981	Spring Adieu	Natalma*
Dam Mahrah (USA) 1987	Vaguely Noble (IRE); 1965	Vienna	Aureole
Dam Mahrah (USA) 1987	Vaguely Noble (IRE); 1965	Vienna	Turkish Blood
Dam Mahrah (USA) 1987	Vaguely Noble (IRE); 1965	Noble Lassie	Nearco
Dam Mahrah (USA) 1987	Vaguely Noble (IRE); 1965	Noble Lassie	Belle Sauvage
Dam Mahrah (USA) 1987	Montage (USA); 1981	Alydar	Raise a Native
Dam Mahrah (USA) 1987	Montage (USA); 1981	Alydar	Sweet Tooth
Dam Mahrah (USA) 1987	Montage (USA); 1981	Katonka	Minnesota Mac
Dam Mahrah (USA) 1987	Montage (USA); 1981	Katonka	Minnetonka (Family: 9-c)

- Like all of Danehill's offspring Oratorio is inbred 4 × 4 to the mare Natalma. This means that she occurs twice in the fourth generation of his pedigree.
