= Suzuka Mambo =

Japanese-bred Thoroughbred racehorse

Suzuka Mambo; スズカマンボ
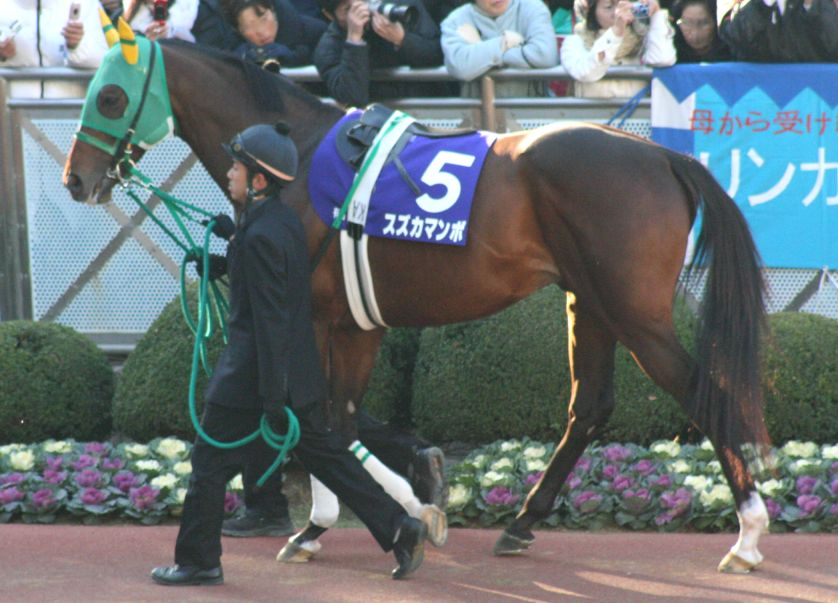
- Suzuka Mambo in 2005
- Breed: Thoroughbred
- Sire: Sunday Silence
- Grandsire: Halo
- Dam: Spring Mambo
- Damsire: Kingmambo
- Sex: Stallion
- Foaled: April 28, 2001
- Died: February 20, 2015 (aged 13)
- Country: Japan
- Color: Bay
- Breeder: Grand Stud
- Owner: Keiji Nagai
- Racing colours
- Trainer: Mitsuru Hashida
- Jockey: Katsumi Ando
- Record: 19: 4-3-2
- Earnings: ¥292,068,000

Major wins
- Hagi Stakes (2003); Asahi Challenge Cup (2004); Tenno Sho (Spring) (2005)

Suzuka Mambo (Japanese: スズカマンボ, Hepburn: Suzuka manbo; April 28, 2001 – February 20, 2015) was a Thoroughbred racehorse and grade I stakes winner. He was sired by Sunday Silence, and out of the Kingmambo daughter Spring Mambo.

== Background ==
Suzuka Mambo was foaled on April 28, 2001, at Japan's Grand Stud. He was sired by 1989 Kentucky Derby winner Sunday Silence, and out of Spring Mambo, a daughter of Kingmambo; he was a dark bay stallion with a white blaze, white stockings on his right front and left rear legs, and a partial coronet marking on his left foreleg.

== Racing career ==
=== 2003: 2 year old season ===
Suzuka Mambo debuted in Sapporo on August 17, 2003, finishing fourth, but he won his next race on August 31. He ran ninth in his next attempt, the GIII Sapporo Nisai Stakes, but then won the Hagi Stakes at Kyoto Racecourse on November 1. The last race of his two-year season was the GI Asahi Hai Futurity Stakes where he finished 13th in a field of 16 horses.

=== 2004: 3 year old season ===
In 2004, Suzuka Mambo ran eight races with widely varying outcomes. His first race of the year was the Keisei Cup in January, where he finished 4th. He then ran second at the Wakaba Stakes in March, with a time of 2:00.2. But in April he took a step back, finishing 17th of 18 horses in the Satsuki Sho, also known as the "Japanese 2000 Guineas." Suzuka Mambo would not have been eligible for the Tokyo Yushun (Japanese Derby) due to insufficient winning prize money, so his connections chose the GII Kyoto Shimbun Hai for his next run, where he finished second behind Heart's Cry and thus was able to get into the derby. In Tokyo for the May 30 race, he was not popular, ranking 15th, but finished a respectable fifth out of 18 horses. After a break of three months, Suzuka Mambo's next race was the GIII Asahi Challenge Cup at Hanshin Racecourse on September 11, 2004, where he was the favorite and won his only race of the year. The race was 2,000 metres (6,600 ft) and his time was 2:00.1. However, in his next effort, the Kikuka Sho (or "Japanese St. Leger") on October 24, he finished sixth. Suzuka Mambo went on to close out his year with the GIII Naruo Kinen. Although he was the favorite, he finished second.

=== 2005 and 2006: 4 and 5 year old season ===
In 2005 as a mature 4 year old, Suzuka Mambo ran five times, four of them Grade I races, again with widely varying results, winning once, and suffering a career-ending injury. His first race was the Osaka-Hamburg Cup on April 9, 2005, at 2,500 metres (8,200 ft), where he finished third. As a result, Suzuka Mambo was only ranked 13th for his next start, the Grade I Spring Tenno Sho, held at Kyoto and contested at 3,200 metres (10,500 ft). However, in that race, he got a good trip on the course and won. He did not race again until the Autumn Tenno Sho on October 30, where he finished last of 18 horses. He tried again in the GI Japan Cup on November 27, where he finished 9th of 18 horses. His next attempt was the December 25 Arima Kinen where he finished 10th out of 16. In 2006, Suzuka Mambo, at 5 years old, began the season on April 2 at the GII Sankei Osaka Hai. In this race, he finished third. After the race Suzuka Mambo developed a serious ligament tear in his left hind leg that ended his racing career.

== Racing form ==
Suzuka Mambo won four races with five podium finishes out of 19 starts. This data is available based on JBIS and netkeiba.

Date	Racecourse	Race	Grade	Distance (Condition)	Entry	HN	Odds (Favored)	Finish	Time	Margins	Jockey	Winner (Runner-up)
2003 – two-year-old season
Aug 17	Sapporo	3yo Newcomer		1,800 m (Firm)	8	6	4.9 (4)	4th	1:54.6	0.6	Yutaka Take	Arabian Nights
Aug 31	Sapporo	3yo Maiden		1,800 m (Firm)	14	11	2.9 (2)	1st	1:52.2	–0.4	Masayoshi Ebina	(Smart Stream)
Oct 4	Sapporo	Sapporo Nisai Stakes	3	1,800 m (Good)	14	3	10.8 (3)	9th	1:55.1	1.0	Masayoshi Ebina	Moere Espoir
Nov 1	Kyoto	Hagi Stakes	OP	1,800 m (Firm)	10	2	16.4 (3)	1st	R1:46.7	–0.1	Hiroyuki Uemura	(Meiner Venado)
Dec 14	Nakayama	Asahi Hai Futurity Stakes	1	1,600 m (Firm)	16	16	17.7 (7)	13th	1:35.7	2.0	Hiroyuki Uemura	Cosmo Sunbeam
2004 – three-year-old season
Jan 18	Nakayama	Keisei Hai	3	2,000 m (Firm)	10	7	7.1 (4)	4th	2:00.1	0.9	Masayoshi Ebina	Focal Point
Mar 20	Hanshin	Wakaba Stakes	OP	2,000 m (Firm)	14	13	8.7 (3)	2nd	2:00.2	0.0	Yuichi Fukunaga	Heart's Cry
Apr 18	Nakayama	Satsuki Sho	1	2,000 m (Firm)	18	17	80.8 (15)	17th	2:00.1	1.5	Masayoshi Ebina	Daiwa Major
May 8	Kyoto	Kyoto Shimbun Hai	2	2,200 m (Firm)	11	5	5.1 (3)	2nd	2:12.0	0.1	Yutaka Take	Heart's Cry
May 30	Tokyo	Tokyo Yushun	1	2,400 m (Firm)	18	13	82.5 (15)	5th	2:24.0	0.7	Koshiro Take	King Kamehameha
Sep 11	Hanshin	Asahi Challenge Cup	3	2,000 m (Firm)	11	11	2.6 (1)	1st	2:01.6	0.0	Yutaka Take	(Vita Rosa)
Oct 24	Kyoto	Kikuka Sho	1	3,000 m (Firm)	18	4	9.7 (5)	6th	3:06.1	0.4	Katsumi Ando	Delta Blues
Dec 12	Hanshin	Naruo Kinen	3	2,000 m (Firm)	15	9	1.9 (1)	2nd	2:00.9	0.2	Katsumi Ando	Sakura Century
2005 – four-year-old season
Apr 9	Hanshin	Osaka-Hamburg Cup	OP	2,500 m (Firm)	12	8	4.8 (3)	3rd	2:32.7	0.2	Hiroyuki Uemura	Big Gold
May 1	Kyoto	Tenno Sho (Spring)	1	3,200 m (Firm)	18	10	35.1 (13)	1st	3:16.5	–0.2	Katsumi Ando	(Big Gold)
Oct 30	Tokyo	Tenno Sho (Autumn)	1	2,000 m (Firm)	18	2	29.7 (8)	13th	2:00.8	0.7	Katsumi Ando	Heavenly Romance
Nov 27	Tokyo	Japan Cup	1	2,400 m (Firm)	18	17	26.3 (10)	9th	2:22.9	0.8	Katsumi Ando	Alkaased
Dec 25	Nakayama	Arima Kinen	1	2,500 m (Firm)	16	5	52.6 (7)	10th	2:32.9	1.0	Katsumi Ando	Heart's Cry
2006 – five-year-old season
Apr 2	Hanshin	Sankei Osaka Hai	2	2,000 m (Soft)	12	12	12.7 (5)	3rd	2:04.8	0.3	Katsumi Ando	Company

Legend:
Turf

- R indicated that it was a record time finish

== Stud career ==
Suzuka Mambo was retired to the Arrow Stud in Hokkaido, where he began his stud career at age seven. Throughout his breeding career, Suzuka Mambo sired a total of 401 foals, of whom 375 started in at least one race, and 276 were winners.

Suzuka Mambo remained at Arrow Stud until his death from heart failure on February 20, 2015. He was buried at the Oumai Horse Park in Shinhidaka, Hokkaido.

=== Notable progeny ===
c = colt, f = filly, g= gelding
Bold = Grade 1 stakes

Foaled	Name	Sex	Major Wins
2009	Eurobeat	g	Mercury Cup
2009	Sambista	f	Breeders' Gold Cup, **JBC Ladies' Classic**, TCK Jo-o Hai, Marine Cup, Ladies' Prelude, **Champions Cup**
2010	Meisho Mambo	f	Fillies' Revue, **Yushun Himba**, **Shūka Shō**, **Queen Elizabeth II Cup**
2013	Meisho Dassai	c	Kokura Summer Jump, Tokyo High-jump, **Nakayama Daishogai**, Hanshin Spring Jump, **Nakayama Grand Jump**

== Pedigree ==
Pedigree of Suzuka Mambo (JPN), bay horse 2001
Sire Sunday Silence (USA) 1986	Halo (USA); 1969	Hail To Reason	Turn-To
Sire Sunday Silence (USA) 1986	Halo (USA); 1969	Hail To Reason	Nothirdchance
Sire Sunday Silence (USA) 1986	Halo (USA); 1969	Cosmah	Cosmic Bomb
Sire Sunday Silence (USA) 1986	Halo (USA); 1969	Cosmah	Almahmoud
Sire Sunday Silence (USA) 1986	Wishing Well (USA); 1975	Understanding	Promised Land
Sire Sunday Silence (USA) 1986	Wishing Well (USA); 1975	Understanding	Pretty Ways
Sire Sunday Silence (USA) 1986	Wishing Well (USA); 1975	Mountain Flower	Montparnasse
Sire Sunday Silence (USA) 1986	Wishing Well (USA); 1975	Mountain Flower	Edel Weiss
Dam Spring Mambo (GB) 1995	Kingmambo (USA); 1990	Mr. Prospector	Raise a Native
Dam Spring Mambo (GB) 1995	Kingmambo (USA); 1990	Mr. Prospector	Gold Digger
Dam Spring Mambo (GB) 1995	Kingmambo (USA); 1990	Miesque	Nureyev
Dam Spring Mambo (GB) 1995	Kingmambo (USA); 1990	Miesque	Pasadoble
Dam Spring Mambo (GB) 1995	Key Flyer (USA); 1986	Nijinsky	Northern Dancer
Dam Spring Mambo (GB) 1995	Key Flyer (USA); 1986	Nijinsky	Flaming Page
Dam Spring Mambo (GB) 1995	Key Flyer (USA); 1986	Key Partner	Key to the Mint
Dam Spring Mambo (GB) 1995	Key Flyer (USA); 1986	Key Partner	Native Partner (Family 7)
