= 2004–05 World Thoroughbred Racehorse Rankings =

The 2004–05 World Thoroughbred Racehorse Rankings is the 2004–05 edition of the World Thoroughbred Racehorse Rankings. It is an assessment of racehorses which was issued by the International Federation of Horseracing Authorities (IFHA) in August 2005. It includes horses aged three or older which raced or were trained during 2004–05 in countries where the flat racing year runs from August 1 to July 31 (and also South America, where it runs from July 1 to June 30). These countries are generally in the Southern Hemisphere, although some areas covered, such as Hong Kong and the United Arab Emirates, are actually north of the equator.

The ratings represent a weight value in pounds, with higher values given to horses which showed greater ability. It is judged that these weights would equalize the abilities of the horses if carried in a theoretical handicap race. The list includes all horses rated 115 or above, and it also shows the surface and the distances at which the rating was achieved.

The highest rating in the 2004–05 season was 123, which was given to the performances of both Roses in May in the Dubai World Cup and Silent Witness in the Hong Kong Sprint. In total, 23 horses were included in the list.

== Full rankings for 2004–05 ==
- Country foaled – Horse names are followed by a suffix indicating the country where foaled.
- Age – The ages shown for horses foaled in the Southern Hemisphere are as of their universal date of increase, August 1, 2004. The ages of those born in the Northern Hemisphere are taken from their equivalent date, January 1, 2005.
- Sex – The following abbreviations are used:
  - C – Colt – Ungelded male horse up to four-years-old.
  - F – Filly – Female horse up to four-years-old.
  - H – Horse – Ungelded male horse over four-years-old.
  - M – Mare – Female horse over four-years-old.
  - G – Gelding – Gelded male horse of any age.

Rank	Rating	Horse	Age	Sex	Trained	Surface	Distance (m)
1	123	Roses in May (USA)	5	H	United States	Dirt	2,000
1	123	Silent Witness (AUS)	5	G	Hong Kong	Turf	1,000
3	120	Grand Armee (AUS)	6	G	Australia	Turf	2,000
4	119	Makybe Diva (GB)	6	M	Australia	Turf	2,400
4	119	Vengeance of Rain (NZ)	4	G	Hong Kong	Turf	2,000
4	119	Vinnie Roe (IRE)	7	G	Ireland	Turf	3,200
7	118	Bullish Luck (USA)	6	G	Hong Kong	Turf	1,600 / 2,000
7	118	Elvstroem (AUS)	4	C	Australia	Turf	1,777 / 1,800 / 2,400
7	118	Fastnet Rock (AUS)	3	C	Australia	Turf	1,000
7	118	Savabeel (AUS)	3	C	Australia	Turf	2,040
11	117	Greys Inn (USA)	4	C	UAE	Turf	2,000 / 2,400
11	117	Mummify (AUS)	5	G	Australia	Turf	2,000
11	117	Starcraft (NZ)	4	C	Australia / GB	Turf	1,600
11	117	Touch of Land (FR)	5	H	France	Turf	2,000
15	116	Fields of Omagh (AUS)	7	G	Australia	Turf	2,040
15	116	Phoenix Reach (IRE)	5	H	Great Britain	Turf	2,400
17	115	Alexander Goldrun (IRE)	4	F	Ireland	Turf	2,000
17	115	Cape of Good Hope (GB)	7	G	Hong Kong	Turf	1,000 / 1,200
17	115	Dynever (USA)	5	H	United States	Dirt	2,000
17	115	Firebreak (GB)	5	G	UAE	Turf	1,600
17	115	Regal Roller (AUS)	5	G	Australia	Turf	1,400
17	115	Tycoon (GB)	4	C	UAE	Turf	2,400
17	115	Yard-Arm (SAF)	5	G	UAE	Turf	1,600

Certain horses may have also recorded a lesser rating over a distance different from that listed above. The IFHA publishes this information when the lower rating represents the overall top performance in a particular category. There was one such additional rating for this season:

Rank	Rating	Horse	Age	Sex	Trained	Surface	Distance (m)
+	117	Makybe Diva (GB)	6	M	Australia	Turf	3,200

== Top ranked horses ==
The tables below show the top ranked horses overall, the top fillies and mares, and the top three-year-olds in the 2004–05 Rankings. They also show the top performers in various subdivisions of each group, which are defined by the distances of races, and the surfaces on which they are run. Top ranked horses rated less than 115 are included where known. The IFHA recognizes five distance categories — Sprint, Mile, Intermediate, Long and Extended — identified by the acronym "SMILE". These are framed as follows:

- Sprint: 1,000–1,300m (1,000–1,599m for races in Canada and the United States)
- Mile: 1,301–1,899m (1,600–1,899m for races in Canada and the United States)
- Intermediate: 1,900–2,100m
- Long: 2,101–2,700m
- Extended: 2,701m +

All Horses
	All Surfaces	Dirt	Turf
All Distances	123 – Roses in May; 123 – Silent Witness	123 – Roses in May	123 – Silent Witness
Sprint	123 – Silent Witness	not listed	123 – Silent Witness
Mile	118 – Bullish Luck; 118 – Elvstroem	not listed	118 – Bullish Luck; 118 – Elvstroem
Intermediate	123 – Roses in May	123 – Roses in May	120 – Grand Armee
Long	119 – Makybe Diva	not listed	119 – Makybe Diva
Extended	119 – Vinnie Roe	not listed	119 – Vinnie Roe
Fillies and Mares
	All Surfaces	Dirt	Turf
All Distances	119 – Makybe Diva	not listed	119 – Makybe Diva
Sprint	113 – Alinghi	not listed	113 – Alinghi
Mile	110 – Shamekha	not listed	110 – Shamekha
Intermediate	115 – Alexander Goldrun	not listed	115 – Alexander Goldrun
Long	119 – Makybe Diva	not listed	119 – Makybe Diva
Extended	117 – Makybe Diva	not listed	117 – Makybe Diva
Three-Year-Olds
	All Surfaces	Dirt	Turf
All Distances	118 – Fastnet Rock; 118 – Savabeel	not listed	118 – Fastnet Rock; 118 – Savabeel
Sprint	118 – Fastnet Rock	not listed	118 – Fastnet Rock
Mile	not listed	not listed	not listed
Intermediate	118 – Savabeel	not listed	118 – Savabeel
Long	not listed	not listed	not listed
Extended	not listed	not listed	not listed
