= Ouija Board (horse) =

British-bred Thoroughbred racehorse (2001–2022)

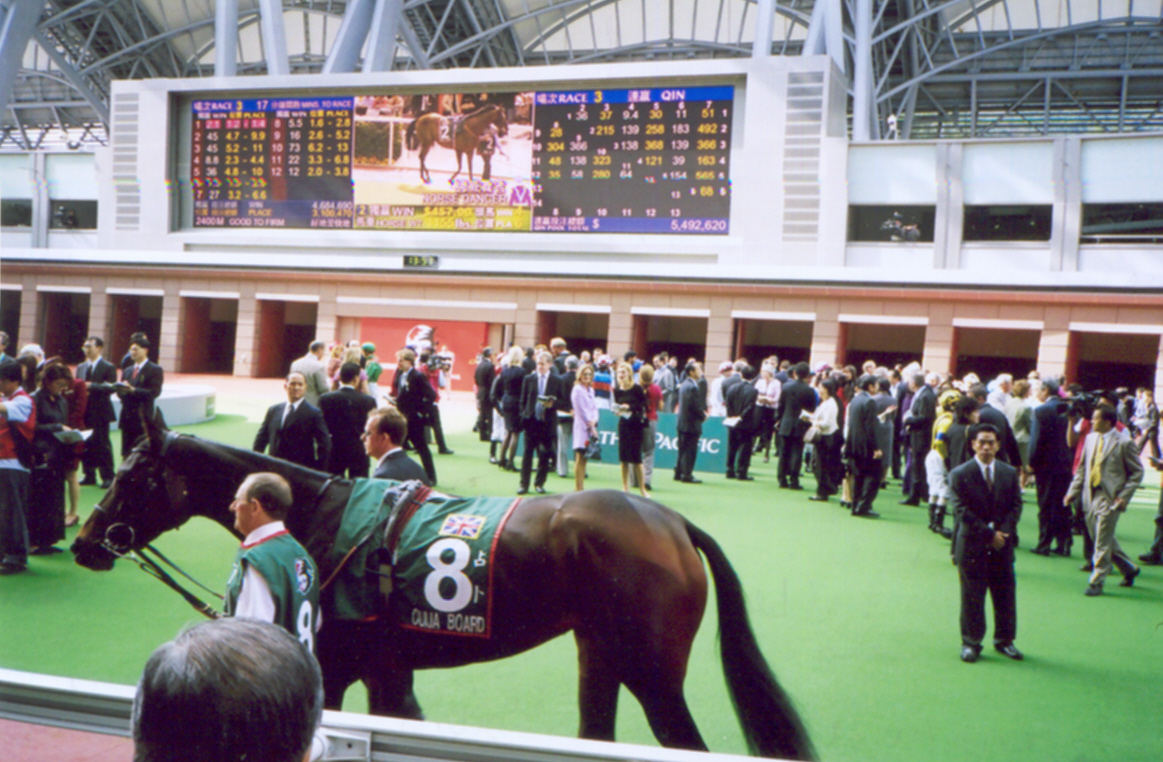
- Ouija Board at the 2005 Hong Kong Vase
- Sire: Cape Cross
- Grandsire: Green Desert
- Dam: Selection Board
- Damsire: Welsh Pageant
- Sex: Mare
- Foaled: 2001
- Died: 29 November 2022 (aged 21)
- Country: Great Britain
- Colour: Bay
- Breeder: Stanley Estate & Stud Co.
- Owner: Lord Derby
- Trainer: Ed Dunlop
- Record: 22:10-3-5
- Earnings: $6,312,552

Major wins
- Epsom Oaks (2004); Irish Oaks (2004); Breeders' Cup Filly & Mare Turf (2004 & 2006); Princess Royal Stakes (2005); Hong Kong Vase (2005); Prince of Wales's Stakes (2006); Nassau Stakes (2006)

Awards
- European Champion Three-Year-Old Filly (2004); Eclipse Award for Outstanding Female Turf Horse (2004 & 2006); European Horse of the Year (2004 & 2006); European Champion Older Horse (2006); Timeform rating: 125

Honours
- Ouija Board Handicap at Lone Star Park
- Last updated on 6 December 2022

Ouija Board (3 March 2001 – 29 November 2022) was a British Thoroughbred racehorse. She was owned by Edward Stanley, 19th Earl of Derby, and trained by Ed Dunlop and Chris Hinson. In a career spanning four seasons, she won 10 of her 22 races, seven of them Group 1s, including the Oaks in 2004 and the Hong Kong Vase in 2005, while amassing over £3 million in prize money. In 2004, she won the Breeders' Cup Filly & Mare Turf and came second to Intercontinental the following year. In 2006, she regained her crown, becoming the second horse to win Breeders' Cup races in non-consecutive years.

Her silks were black, with a white cap and a single white button below the collar. She had seven different jockeys, with Olivier Peslier, Kieren Fallon, Frankie Dettori and Jamie Spencer all victorious. As a broodmare, she produced Australia, winner of the 2014 Epsom Derby.

== Racing career ==
=== 2003: two-year-old season ===
Ouija Board's debut came at Newmarket Racecourse over seven furlongs, when she finished third, a length behind the winner. She was turned out 18 days later at Great Yarmouth Racecourse running over the same distance, although she was victorious this time. 11 days later, she made her third start of the season, again at Newmarket, over a furlong extra in a Listed event, and again finished third. It was her final start of the 2003 season.

=== 2004: three-year-old season ===
Her first outing in 2004 came at Newmarket in the Pretty Polly Stakes over 10 furlongs, a traditional trial for The Oaks. Ouija Board won by six lengths, and her connections opted to go straight to Epsom, rather than run in any other traditional trials such as the Musidora Stakes at York.

She started The Oaks at 7/2 odds second favourite behind the Aidan O'Brien-trained All Too Beautiful, as well as taking on the Godolphin duo of Punctillious and Sundrop. Ouija Board won by seven lengths to help jockey Kieren Fallon complete an Oaks-Derby double. Her next target was the Irish Oaks, in which two of her Epsom victims were reopposing - Punctillious and All Too Beautiful, but neither seriously challenged, and Ouija Board won by a length from the former.

Connections had eyed up a crack at Prix de l'Arc de Triomphe for Ouija Board, attempting to make her the first female to win the race since Urban Sea in 1993. With new jockey Johnny Murtagh aboard, she was boxed in throughout the race and got out late to finish 1 1/2 lengths behind the winner, Bago.

Despite the loss, she remained on target for the Breeders' Cup Filly & Mare Turf at Lone Star Park at the end of October 2004, reunited with jockey Kieren Fallon. She produced her customary turn of foot to win by 1 1/2 lengths. For her 2004 performances, Ouija Board was voted the Eclipse Award for Outstanding Female Turf Horse and named European Horse of the Year.

=== 2005: four-year-old season ===
Several problems at the start of the 2005 season meant Ouija Board's seasonal reappearance came as late as June at Royal Ascot in the Prince of Wales's Stakes. Jamie Spencer was on-board since Fallon was riding for Ballydoyle and Dettori had a ban that saw him miss the whole of the meeting. Ouija Board lost a shoe round the final bend and tailed off to finish seventh, thirty lengths behind the winner, Azamour.

However, she bounced back at Newmarket three months later in her next start, in the Group 3 Princess Royal Stakes, winning under new jockey Frankie Dettori. Her end-of-season aim was once again the Breeders' Cup Filly & Mare Turf, although she was partnered by another new jockey, US Hall of Fame rider Jerry Bailey. The race was run over a furlong less than the previous year due to the race being run at Belmont Park. Ouija Board finished second, a length behind the winner.

Her relatively short season meant she was still fresh, and connections decided to send her to Japan for a crack at the Japan Cup, in which she finished fifth to Alkaased, by two lengths. She was sent to Hong Kong two weeks later for the Hong Kong Vase. Under regular rider Kieren Fallon, Ouija Board won by two and a half lengths.

=== 2006: five-year-old season ===
It was decided that Ouija Board would stay in training for one final season, with the Dubai Sheema Classic her first target. Kieren Fallon was again on board, and she ran very flat whilst finishing fourth, although Fallon reported that 'she was not herself,' and that the firework display just minutes beforehand unsettled her badly.

Ouija Board was next shipped to Sha Tin Racecourse in Hong Kong for April's Queen Elizabeth II Cup, where she was reunited with Frankie Dettori for the HK$14 million (US$1.8 million) Group One event. Although running over 10 furlongs, 2 furlongs shorter than her preferred distance, she finished 3rd to winner Irridescence. Although never admitted, connections felt Dettori holding her up in the rear for so long cost her the race.

A return visit to the scene of arguably her greatest triumph was next, as she was sent to Epsom for a crack at the Coronation Cup. André Fabre's Shirocco went off favourite and won. Ed Dunlop said after the race that a trip to Royal Ascot was not completely out of the question, with either the Prince of Wales's Stakes over 10 furlongs or Hardwicke Stakes over her preferred 12 furlong distance.

Ouija Board was confirmed as a runner in the Prince of Wales's Stakes, in a very competitive race. Dubai World Cup winner Electrocutionist, Champion Stakes and Dubai Duty Free Stakes winner David Junior, Brigadier Gerard Stakes winner Notnowcato, Breeders' Cup Turf runner-up Ace and Manduro all lined up against her. With new jockey Olivier Peslier aboard, Ouija Board won by half a length.

She was entered for the Coral Eclipse 17 days later, with another new jockey in Christophe Soumillon on board. However, she was bumped around in midfield and denied a run, finishing fifth, with David Junior winning. Soumillon was berated by critics for his ride, and again criticised by connections, although again this was not confirmed.

Ouija Board had been considered for the "King George", but connections felt she had not recovered from her cuts and bruises from the Eclipse and was left out, although she was confirmed a runner in the Group 1 Nassau Stakes at Goodwood Racecourse a week later.

Dettori was once again aboard as Ouija Board lined up in a very competitive field, including Hong Kong Cup winner Alexander Goldrun, Coronation Stakes winner Nannina, Echelon, and Race For The Stars, a half-sister to Hawk Wing. Ouija Board and Alexander Goldrun battled eye-to-eye for the final quarter of a mile. Ouija Board was declared the winner after a photo finish.

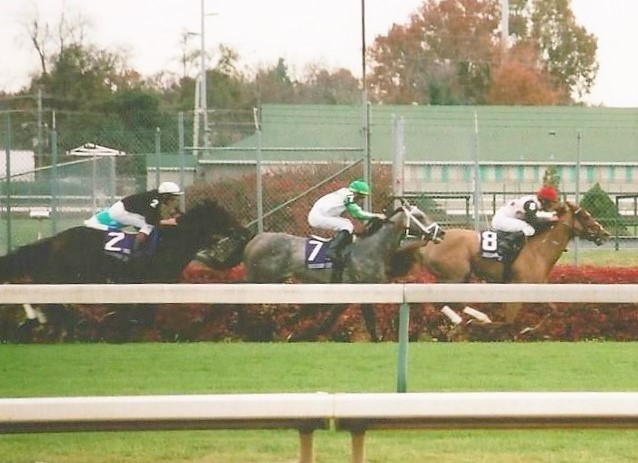
Ouija Board (saddlecloth #2) in the Filly and Mare Turf, has worked her way into the clear

She lined up next for the Irish Champion Stakes in a rematch with Alexander Goldrun from Goodwood, and the additional threat of Dylan Thomas, the Budweiser Irish Derby winner, coming from the formidable trio of Magnier, Aidan O'Brien and Fallon. Ouija Board was partnered by Jamie Spencer once more, due to Dettori riding in the St. Leger Stakes on the same day and Fallon engaged in the same race. Spencer took Ouija Board past Dylan Thomas with just over a furlong to go, but the colt battled back to win by a neck.

The Breeders' Cup Filly & Mare Turf at Churchill Downs had always been her main seasonal target, and with regular partner Dettori aboard, she was sent off a very warm favourite, and despite being boxed in with three furlongs to go, she sprinted clear of the field and won.

== Retirement ==
Just a day before Ouija Board was due to run in her last ever race, the Hong Kong Vase, a slight injury was discovered, resulting in immediate retirement. If placing second or higher in the race, she would have become the highest-earning British race horse in history. She was awarded the Eclipse Award for Outstanding Female Turf Horse in 2006, to add to her previous win of the same award in 2004.

Ouija Board was pensioned from broodmare duties in 2018 and died on 29 November 2022, at the age of 21.

== Stud record ==
Ouija Board gave birth to a bay colt by Kingmambo on 9 February 2008 now named Voodoo Prince, and was then covered by top German stallion Monsun, the foal of which was a colt born on 14 February 2009 and named Aegaeus. Ouija Board gave birth to her third foal at Stanley House Stud in Newmarket in 2010, a filly by Galileo named Filia Regina. She is the first filly produced by the multiple Group 1-winning daughter of Cape Cross, and consequently will be retained to race by Lord Derby. Voodoo Prince and Aegaeus made their racing debuts at Newbury on 16 April 2011 and 16 April 2012.

2008 Voodoo Prince (GB) : Bay gelding, foaled 9 February, by Kingmambo (USA) - won 3 races in England before being sold to race in Australia for £80,000. Now races under the name Our Voodoo Prince. Winner of 3 races in Australia including the 2014 Group 3 Easter Cup at Flemington Racecourse euthanized after fracturing a hind pastern in his last race at Flemington December 2015

2009 Aegaeus (GB) : Bay gelding, foaled 14 February, by Monsun (GER) - won 2 races in England 2012–13, sold to race in Germany

2010 Filia Regina (GB) : Bay filly, foaled 20 February, by Galileo (IRE) - minor winner in England 2013, now a broodmare also at Stanley House Stud, Foaled a bay filly by Dubawi 10 March 2016

2011 Australia (GB) : Chestnut colt, foaled 8 April, by Galileo (IRE) - won 2 races in Ireland 2013 including G3 Breeders' Cup Juvenile Turf Trial Stakes, Leopardstown and in 2014 winner of The Derby, Irish Derby at The Curragh and G1 International Stakes at York.

2013 Frontiersman (GB) : Brown colt, foaled 10 February, by Dubawi (IRE) - won 3 races and placed twice, including 2nd G1 Coronation Cup at Epsom, from 8 starts in England to date (2/06/17)

== Pedigree ==
Pedigree of Ouija Board, bay mare, 2001
Sire Cape Cross (IRE) 1994	Green Desert (USA); 1983	Danzig (USA); 1977	Northern Dancer (CAN)
Sire Cape Cross (IRE) 1994	Green Desert (USA); 1983	Danzig (USA); 1977	Pas De Nom (USA)
Sire Cape Cross (IRE) 1994	Green Desert (USA); 1983	Foreign Courier (USA); 1979	Sir Ivor (USA)
Sire Cape Cross (IRE) 1994	Green Desert (USA); 1983	Foreign Courier (USA); 1979	Courtly Dee (USA)
Sire Cape Cross (IRE) 1994	Park Appeal (IRE); 1982	Ahonoora (GB); 1975	Lorenzaccio (IRE)
Sire Cape Cross (IRE) 1994	Park Appeal (IRE); 1982	Ahonoora (GB); 1975	Helen Nichols (GB)
Sire Cape Cross (IRE) 1994	Park Appeal (IRE); 1982	Balidaress (IRE); 1973	Balidar (IRE)
Sire Cape Cross (IRE) 1994	Park Appeal (IRE); 1982	Balidaress (IRE); 1973	Innocence (GB)
Dam Selection Board (GB) 1982	Welsh Pageant (FR); 1966	Tudor Melody (GB); 1956	Tudor Minstrel (GB)
Dam Selection Board (GB) 1982	Welsh Pageant (FR); 1966	Tudor Melody (GB); 1956	Matelda (GB)
Dam Selection Board (GB) 1982	Welsh Pageant (FR); 1966	Picture Light (FR); 1954	Court Martial (GB)
Dam Selection Board (GB) 1982	Welsh Pageant (FR); 1966	Picture Light (FR); 1954	Queen of Light (GB)
Dam Selection Board (GB) 1982	Ouija (GB); 1971	Silly Season (USA); 1962	Tom Fool (USA)
Dam Selection Board (GB) 1982	Ouija (GB); 1971	Silly Season (USA); 1962	Double Deal (GB)
Dam Selection Board (GB) 1982	Ouija (GB); 1971	Samanda (GB); 1956	Alycidon (GB)
Dam Selection Board (GB) 1982	Ouija (GB); 1971	Samanda (GB); 1956	Gradisca (GB)
