= Electrocutionist =

American-bred Thoroughbred racehorse

- Sire: Red Ransom
- Grandsire: Roberto
- Dam: Elbaaha
- Damsire: Arazi
- Sex: Stallion
- Foaled: 24 February 2001
- Died: 9 September 2006 (aged 5)
- Country: United States
- Colour: Bay
- Breeder: Compagnia Generale
- Owner: Earle I. Mack; Godolphin Racing (2006)
- Trainer: Valfredo Valiani; Saeed bin Suroor (2006)
- Record: 12: 8-3-1
- Earnings: £3,160,432

Major wins
- Gran Premio d'Italia (2004); Premio Carlo d'Alessio (2005); Gran Premio di Milano (2005); Juddmonte International (2005); Al Maktoum Challenge, Round 3 (2006); Dubai World Cup (2006)
- Last updated on June 28, 2011

Electrocutionist (February 24, 2001 - September 9, 2006) was a Thoroughbred racehorse. Electrocutionist won eight of his 12 career starts, including three Grade I's, and won more than $5.6 million. Racing four times for the operation based in both Dubai and Newmarket, he was scheduled to participate in the Emirates Airline Champion Stakes (Eng-I) at Newmarket on Oct. 14, 2006.

== Background ==
He was owned by Earle I. Mack, United States Ambassador to Finland and a member of the board of directors of the New York Racing Association. Electrocutionist was trained in Italy by Valfredo Valiani before being bought by Godolphin Racing in November 2005. Based in Dubai during the winter months, in the spring of 2006 he was sent to Godolphin's stables in Newmarket, England.

== Racing career ==
After winning the 2006 Dubai World Cup, Electrocutionist placed second to Ouija Board in the Prince of Wales's Stakes at Royal Ascot, and finished second again by a short margin to Hurricane Run in the King George VI and Queen Elizabeth Stakes, also at Ascot.

== Sudden death ==
On September 9, 2006, Electrocutionist suffered an unexpected and fatal heart attack. Five days before his death, an abnormality was discovered in his heart, but it was deemed nothing to cause concern to his owners and trainer.

Godolphin's main trainer in Europe, Saeed bin Suroor, said: "He was a wonderful, brave horse, a real pleasure to train. He gave his best every time he ran and I will always remember the courage and class he showed in winning the Dubai World Cup. He was a champion."

Pedigree Online wrote of Electrocutionist moments after learning of his death: "A tremendously brave and talented horse. To perform as he did with such a condition, truly a champion. RIP."

== Pedigree ==
Pedigree of Electrocutionist
Sire Red Ransom 1987	Roberto; 1969	Hail To Reason	Turn-To
Sire Red Ransom 1987	Roberto; 1969	Hail To Reason	Nothirdchance
Sire Red Ransom 1987	Roberto; 1969	Bramalea	Nashua
Sire Red Ransom 1987	Roberto; 1969	Bramalea	Rarelea
Sire Red Ransom 1987	Arabia; 1977	Damascus	Sword Dancer
Sire Red Ransom 1987	Arabia; 1977	Damascus	Kerala
Sire Red Ransom 1987	Arabia; 1977	Christmas Wind	Nearctic
Sire Red Ransom 1987	Arabia; 1977	Christmas Wind	Baly Free
Dam Elbaaha 1994	Arazi; 1989	Blushing Groom	Red God
Dam Elbaaha 1994	Arazi; 1989	Blushing Groom	Runaway Bride
Dam Elbaaha 1994	Arazi; 1989	Danseur Fabuleux	Northern Dancer
Dam Elbaaha 1994	Arazi; 1989	Danseur Fabuleux	Fabuleux Jane
Dam Elbaaha 1994	Gesedeh; 1983	Ela-Mana-Mou	Pitcairn
Dam Elbaaha 1994	Gesedeh; 1983	Ela-Mana-Mou	Rose Bertin
Dam Elbaaha 1994	Gesedeh; 1983	Le Melody	Levmoss
Dam Elbaaha 1994	Gesedeh; 1983	Le Melody	Arctic Melody (Family:23)
