= Alexander Goldrun =

Irish-bred Thoroughbred racehorse

- Sire: Gold Away
- Grandsire: Goldneyev
- Dam: Renashaan
- Damsire: Darshaan
- Sex: Mare
- Foaled: 9 February 2001
- Country: Ireland
- Colour: Bay
- Breeder: Dermot Cantillon
- Owner: Mrs. Noel O'Callaghan
- Trainer: Jim Bolger
- Record: 31: 10-7-6
- Earnings: £1,900,740

Major wins
- Derrinstown Stud 1,000 Guineas Trial (2003); Prix de l'Opéra (2004); Hong Kong Cup (2004); Pretty Polly Stakes (2004, 2005); Nassau Stakes (2005)
- Last updated on 21 June 2007

Alexander Goldrun (foaled 9 February 2001 in Ireland) is a retired Thoroughbred racehorse. Bred by Dermot Cantillon, she was raced by Mrs. Noel O'Callaghan for whom she compiled a race record of 10 wins, seven seconds, and six thirds in thirty-one starts. She retired with race earnings of £1,900,740

Trained by Jim Bolger, during her career in racing Goldrun won five Group One races in four countries :

- Hong Kong
  - Hong Kong Cup (2004)
- France
  - Prix de l'Opéra (2004)
- United Kingdom
  - Nassau Stakes (2005)
- Ireland
  - Pretty Polly Stakes (2005, 2006)

== Pedigree ==
Pedigree of Alexander Goldrun
Sire Gold Away 1995	Goldneyev 1986	Nureyev	Northern Dancer
Sire Gold Away 1995	Goldneyev 1986	Nureyev	Special
Sire Gold Away 1995	Goldneyev 1986	Gold River	Riverman
Sire Gold Away 1995	Goldneyev 1986	Gold River	Glaneuse
Sire Gold Away 1995	Blushing Away 1987	Blushing Groom	Red God
Sire Gold Away 1995	Blushing Away 1987	Blushing Groom	Runaway Bride
Sire Gold Away 1995	Blushing Away 1987	Sweet Revenge	Raja Baba
Sire Gold Away 1995	Blushing Away 1987	Sweet Revenge	Away
Dam Renashaan 1989	Darshaan 1981	Shirley Heights	Mill Reef
Dam Renashaan 1989	Darshaan 1981	Shirley Heights	Hardiemma
Dam Renashaan 1989	Darshaan 1981	Delsy	Abdos
Dam Renashaan 1989	Darshaan 1981	Delsy	Kelty
Dam Renashaan 1989	Gerbera 1984	Lyphard	Northern Dancer
Dam Renashaan 1989	Gerbera 1984	Lyphard	Goofed
Dam Renashaan 1989	Gerbera 1984	Greenway	Targowice
Dam Renashaan 1989	Gerbera 1984	Greenway	Gracious
