= Valixir =

Irish-bred Thoroughbred racehorse

- Sire: Trempolino
- Grandsire: Sharpen Up
- Dam: Vadlamixa
- Damsire: Linamix
- Sex: Stallion
- Foaled: 31 March 2001
- Country: Ireland
- Colour: Bay
- Breeder: S N C Lagardere Elevage
- Owner: Lagardere Family; Aga Khan IV; Godolphin
- Trainer: André Fabre; Saeed bin Suroor
- Record: 19: 8-1-4
- Earnings: £570,654

Major wins
- Prix Matchem (2004); Prix Eugène Adam (2004); Prix Niel (2004); Prix d'Ispahan (2005); Queen Anne Stakes (2005); Prix Messidor (2005)

Valixir (foaled 30 March 2001) is an Irish-bred Thoroughbred racehorse and sire. He was trained for most of his career in France where he won two minor races and finished second in the Prix des Chênes as a juvenile in 2003. When campaigned over middle distances in 2004 he won the Prix Matchem, Prix Eugène Adam and Prix Niel as well as being placed in both the Prix du Jockey Club and the Prix Lupin. He was even better when brought back to shorter distances in the following year and recorded Group One victories in the Prix d'Ispahan and the Queen Anne Stakes. He transferred to the Godolphin stable in 2006 but showed no worthwhile form in three starts. Valixir was retired from racing to become a breeding stallion in Australia.

== Background ==
Valixir is a bay horse with a white blaze and three white socks bred in Ireland by Lagardere Elevage the breeding operation of his owner Jean-Luc Lagardère. After Lagardere's death in March 2003 the ownership of the colt passed to the Lagardere Family. He was sent into training with André Fabre.

Valixir was sired by Trempolino who won the Prix de l'Arc de Triomphe and finished second in the Breeders' Cup Turf as a three-year-old in 1987. As a breeding stallion, his other offspring included Dernier Empereur, Arkadian Hero (Mill Reef Stakes) and Germany (Grosser Preis von Baden). Valixir's dam Vadlamixa showed ability as a racehorse, winning the Listed Prix de Lieurey as a three-year-old in 1995, and was a half-sister to Val Royal.

== Racing career ==
=== 2003: two-year-old season ===
In 2003 Valixir was ridden in all of his three races by Christophe Soumillon. He made his racecourse debut in the Prix Hunyade over 1200 metres at Maisons-Laffitte Racecourse on 15 July and won by three lengths from nine opponents. He followed up at Deauville Racecourse in August when he won the Prix Irish River over the same distance. On 20 September the colt was moved up in class and distance for the Group Three Prix des Chênes over 1600 metres at Longchamp Racecourse and was made the 1.7/1 favourite in a seven-runner field. After racing in fourth place he took the lead 200 metres from the finish but was overtaken in the closing stages and beaten into second place by Bago.

=== 2004: three-year-old season ===
The American jockey Gary Stevens took over from Soumillon when Valixir made his first appearance of 2004 in the Listed Prix Matchem over 1800 metres at Maisons-Laffitte on 20 April. Starting the odds-on favourite, Valixir took the lead 300 metres from the finish and accelerated clear of his rivals to win "easily" by four lengths from Red Tune. He was then stepped up to Group One class for the final running of the Prix Lupin over 2100 metres at Longchamp on 18 May and finished third behind Voix du Nord and Millemix after briefly leading in the straight.

On 6 June, Éric Legrix took over from Stevens when Valixir started at odds of 7.5/1 for the 167th running of the Prix du Jockey Club over 2400 metres at Chantilly Racecourse. After racing in mid-division he stayed on strongly in the straight to finish third, beaten a head and half a length by Blue Canari and Prospect Park. Legrix was again in the saddle when Valixir started 3/5 favourite for the Group Two Prix Eugène Adam over 2000 metres at Maisons-Laffitte on 14 July. He led from the start, went clear of his rivals in the last 300 metres and won "easily" by three lengths from the Prix La Force winner Delfos with the British challengers Hazyview (Newmarket Stakes) and African Dream (Dee Stakes) in third and fourth.

After a late summer break Valixir returned on 12 September for the Group Two Prix Niel (a trial race for the Prix de l'Arc de Triomphe) over 2400 metres at Longchamp and started the 11/2 fourth choice in the betting behind Bago, Prospect Park and Blue Canari. After racing in fourth place he moved up to second in the straight and caught Prospect Park in the final strides to win by a nose with Bago a length away in third. After the race Legrix said "There is still a lot to come from this horse and he must have a good chance in the Arc. He has a bit of temperament, but was relaxed today. When I asked him to go 250 meters out, he passed his rivals really well. He lost concentration when he got to the front, but came back again". In the 2004 Prix de l'Arc de Triomphe at Longchamp on 2 October Valixir started the 9/1 fourth favourite in a nineteen-runner field but never looked likely to win and finished tenth behind Bago.

At the end of the year Valixir was bought privately by the Aga Khan, but remained in Fabre's stable for the 2005 season.

=== 2005: four-year-old season ===
Valixir began his third season with a trip to England for the Earl of Sefton Stakes over nine furlongs at Newmarket Racecourse on 13 April and finished third of the ten runners behind Norse Dancer. After this race Soumillon resumed his partnership with Valixir and rode him in all of his subsequent races that year. On 22 May the colt contested the Group One Prix d'Ispahan over 1800 metres at Longchamp and started 2.5/1 joint favourite alongside his stablemate Cacique. The other six runners included the Australian champion Elvstroem, Touch of Land (Prix Dollar), Fort Dignity (Royal Windsor Stakes) and Tolpuddle (Amethyst Stakes). After tracking the leaders, Valixir made progress in the straight, overtook Elvstroem just inside the last 200 metres and won by two lengths with Cacique taking third ahead of Touch of Land. After the race the Aga Khan's representative said "Valixir won very nicely and to reduce him in distance was a good idea" whilst Soumillon commented "He had a lovely run but he is a strange horse to ride, Halfway up the straight there wasn't enough room on the rail but then the Australian horse left us a gap and we went. Valixir is a horse who doesn't like contact with others".

In June Valixir was sent back to England for the Group One Queen Anne Stakes over one mile and started the 4/1 second choice in the betting behind the odds-on favourite Rakti. The other eight runners included Starcraft, Pastoral Pursuits, Martillo (Mehl-Mulhens-Rennen), Prince Kirk (2004 Prix d'Ispahan) and Hurricane Alan (Sandown Mile). As Ascot Racecourse was closed for redevelopment the 2005 "Royal Ascot" meeting (including the Queen Anne) was relocated and took place at York Racecourse. Soumillon settled the colt behind the leaders before moving up to take the lead from Rakti approaching the final furlong. Valixir ran on strongly to win by a length and a half from the favourite with Starcraft half a length away in third place. After the race the Aga Khan said "I have not had horses with André Fabre until recently and he is an outstanding trainer. It looked as though Rakti wasn't going to go on and I think Christophe found himself in front a bit earlier than he expected. The horse surprised me today in the sense that he has improved". Soumillon, who described the winner as "a true champion", celebrated by throwing his riding whip into the crowd.

At Maisons-Laffitte in July the colt was dropped to Group Three class for the Prix Messidor and started odds-on favourite despite carrying top weight of 136 pounds. He led from the start and won "comfortably" by a length from the Prix Daniel Wildenstein winner Special Kaldoun.

In his next two races Valixir contested France's two most prestigious weight-for-age events over one mile: the Prix Jacques Le Marois at Deauville in August and the Prix du Moulin at Longchamp in September. At Deauville he was held up at the rear of the field before staying on in the closing stages and finished third to Dubawi and Whipper with the favourite Divine Proportions in fourth place. At Longchamp he started favourite against eight opponents but after turning into the straight he was unable to quicken in the closing stages and finished fifth, more than six lengths behind the winner Starcraft. On his final run of the year Valixir was sent to the United States for the Breeders' Cup Mile at Belmont Park on 29 October. He started the 8/1 third choice in the betting but made little impact in the race, finishing tenth of the eleven runners behind Artie Schiller.

At the end of November, Valixir was acquired by Sheikh Mohammed's Godolphin organisation and joined the training stable of Saeed bin Suroor.

=== 2006: five-year-old season ===
In 2006 Valixir was ridden is all three of his starts by Frankie Dettori and began his season at Nad Al Sheba Racecourse in Dubai. On 3 March he started second favourite for the Jebel Hatta but after leading from most of the way he was outpaced in the closing stages and finished seventh behind Touch of Land. Three weeks later he started second favourite for the Dubai Duty Free but ran very poorly, finishing fourteenth of the fifteen runners, more than twenty lengths behind the winner David Junior. Valixir was then sent to Singapore on 14 May for the Singapore Airlines International Cup at Kranji Racecourse where he finished last of the thirteen runners behind the Japanese runner Cosmo Bulk.

== Assessment ==
In the 2004 World Thoroughbred Racehorse Rankings Valixir was given a rating of 116, sixteen pounds behind the top-rated Ghostzapper, making him the 82nd best racehorse in the world. In the following year his 121 rating made him the 30th best racehorse in the world and the top-rated four-year-old in Europe over one mile.

== Stud record ==
At the end of his racing career Valixir was acquired by the New South Wales-based Lomar Park Stud and was retired to become a breeding stallion in Australia. He has sired several minor winners but no top-class performers.

== Pedigree ==
Pedigree of Valixir (IRE), bay stallion, 2001
| Sire Trempolino (GB) 1984 | Sharpen Up (GB); 1969 | Atan | Native Dancer |
| Sire Trempolino (GB) 1984 | Sharpen Up (GB); 1969 | Atan | Mixed Marriage |
| Sire Trempolino (GB) 1984 | Sharpen Up (GB); 1969 | Rocchetta | Rockefella |
| Sire Trempolino (GB) 1984 | Sharpen Up (GB); 1969 | Rocchetta | Chambiges |
| Sire Trempolino (GB) 1984 | Trephine (FR); 1977 | Viceregal | Northern Dancer |
| Sire Trempolino (GB) 1984 | Trephine (FR); 1977 | Viceregal | Victoria Regina |
| Sire Trempolino (GB) 1984 | Trephine (FR); 1977 | Quiriquina | Molvedo |
| Sire Trempolino (GB) 1984 | Trephine (FR); 1977 | Quiriquina | La Chaussee |
| Dam Vadlamixa (FR) 1992 | Linamix (FR); 1987 | Mendez | Bellypha |
| Dam Vadlamixa (FR) 1992 | Linamix (FR); 1987 | Mendez | Miss Carina |
| Dam Vadlamixa (FR) 1992 | Linamix (FR); 1987 | Lunadix | Breton |
| Dam Vadlamixa (FR) 1992 | Linamix (FR); 1987 | Lunadix | Lutine |
| Dam Vadlamixa (FR) 1992 | Vadlava (FR); 1984 | Bikala | Kalamoun |
| Dam Vadlamixa (FR) 1992 | Vadlava (FR); 1984 | Bikala | Irish Bird |
| Dam Vadlamixa (FR) 1992 | Vadlava (FR); 1984 | Vadsa | Halo |
| Dam Vadlamixa (FR) 1992 | Vadlava (FR); 1984 | Vadsa | Rainbow's Edge (Family: 20-d) |
