= Trempolino =

American-bred Thoroughbred racehorse

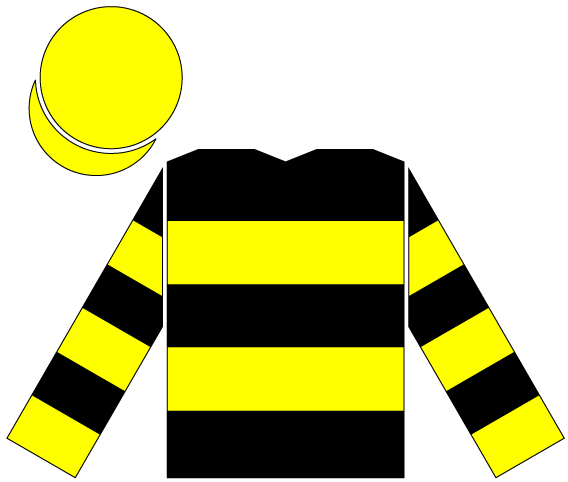
- Racing silks of Paul de Moussac
- Sire: Sharpen Up
- Grandsire: Atan
- Dam: Trephine
- Damsire: Viceregal
- Sex: Stallion
- Foaled: March 17, 1984
- Died: March 19, 2018 (aged 34)
- Country: United States
- Colour: Chestnut
- Breeder: Marystead Farm
- Owner: Paul de Moussac & Bruce McNall
- Trainer: André Fabre
- Record: 11: 4-3-3
- Earnings: US$1,388,517 (equivalent)

Major wins
- Prix de Courcelles (1987); Prix Niel (1987); Prix de l'Arc de Triomphe (1987)

Awards
- Timeform rating: 135
- Last updated on August 24, 2008

Trempolino (March 17, 1984 –March 19, 2018) was a French Thoroughbred racehorse best known for winning the prestigious Prix de l'Arc de Triomphe in 1987.

== Background ==
He was bred by Marystead Farm, the American arm of French horseman Paul de Moussac, owner of the Haras du Mezeray stud farm at Ticheville in the Lower Normandy Region of France. Sired by Sharpen Up, he was out of the mare Trephine who was a daughter of Canadian Horse of the Year, Viceregal, a first-crop son of Northern Dancer. He was conditioned for racing by André Fabre.

== Racing career ==
Trempolino's best performance at age two was a fourth-place finish (promoted to third on disqualification of the winner) in the Critérium de Maisons-Laffitte. At three in 1987, he ran second in the Prix du Jockey Club and Prix Lupin, and was third in the Grand Prix de Paris and the Prix Guillaume d'Ornano. His important wins that year all came at Longchamp Racecourse in Paris where he won a Listed race, the Prix de Courcelles, plus the prep for the Prix de l'Arc de Triomphe, the G2 Prix Niel.

A few days before the Arc, Laura de Seroux, on behalf of Los Angeles businessman Bruce McNall, purchased a half interest in Trempolino. The eleven-horse field for that year's Arc was a strong one with top European runners such as Tony Bin, Triptych and Reference Point, the latter sent off as the betting favorite. Ridden by Pat Eddery, Trempolino capitalized on a fast pace and won in record time, beating the record set by Dancing Brave in 1986 by a full 1.3 seconds. Pat Eddery was aboard Trempolino again six weeks later in the Breeders' Cup Turf at Hollywood Park Racetrack in California in which he finished second to Theatrical.

== Stud record ==
Retired to stud, Trempolino stood at Gainesway Farm in Lexington, Kentucky where he remained until 2000 when he was sent to Paul de Moussac's Haras du Mezeray in France. He was pensioned from stud duties in 2012 and died in March 2018 at the age of 34. He sired a number of successful runners as well as important broodmares.

Sire of:

- Dernier Empereur (b. 1990) – won races in France, England, and the United States including the G1 Champion Stakes, G2 Del Mar Handicap
- Snow Polina (b. 1995) – won G1 Beverly D. Stakes
- Valixir (b. 2001) – won G1: Prix d'Ispahan (2005), G1 Queen Anne Stakes (2005), G2: Prix Eugène Adam (2004), Prix Niel (2004)

Damsire of:

- Blue Canari (b. 2001) – won Prix du Jockey Club (2004)
- Round Pond (b. 2002) – won Breeders' Cup Distaff (2006)
- Action This Day (b. 2001) – won Breeders' Cup Juvenile (2003), American Champion Two-Year-Old Colt (2003)
