= La Coupe de Maisons-Laffitte =

Flat horse race in France

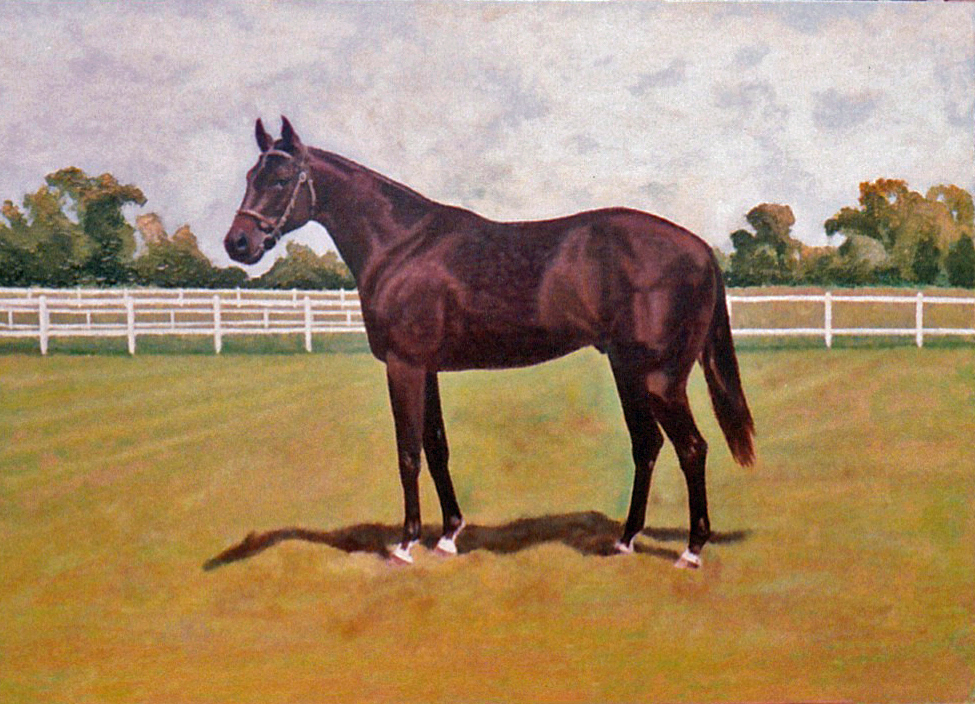
- Trepan, winner in 1975, oil on canvas painted by Bob Demuyser (1920–2003)
- Class: Group 3
- Location: Maisons-Laffitte; France
- Inaugurated: 1906
- Race type: Flat / Thoroughbred
- Website: france-galop.com

Race information
- Distance: 2,000 metres (1¼ miles)
- Surface: Turf
- Track: Straight
- Qualification: Three-years-old and up
- Weight: 54 kg (3yo); 57 kg (4yo+); Allowances; 1½ kg for fillies and mares Penalties; 3 kg for Group 1 winners * 3 kg if two Group 2 wins * 2 kg if one Group 2 win * 2 kg if two Group 3 wins * 1 kg if one Group 3 win * * since January 1
- Purse: €80,000 (2021); 1st: €40,000

La Coupe de Maisons-Laffitte
2024
Certain Lad	Haya Zark	Al Mubhir

Previous years
2023
Naranco	Lord Charming	True Testament
2022
Monty	Riocorvo	Best Of Lips
2021
Dawn Intello	Seachange	Kenway

2020–2011
2020
Glycon	Villa Rosa	Les Vertus
2019
Villa Rosa	Intellogent	Trais Fluors
2018
Golden Legend	Robin Of Navan	Spotify
2017
Garlingari	One Foot In Heaven	Haggle
2016
Banzari	Ame Bleue	Floodlight
2015
Gailo Chop	Al Waab	Ectot
2014
Fractional	Smoking Sun	Planetaire
2013
Cirrus Des Aigles	Vally Jem	Smoking Sun
2012
Maxios	Reliable Man	Saga Dream
2011
One Clever Cat	Agent Secret	Kya One

2010–2001
2010
Akarlina	Reggane	Hermoun
2009
Chinchon	Putney Bridge	Sans Chichi
2008
Pallodio	Full Of Gold	Chinchon
2007
Musical Way	Kocab	Fontcia
2006
Musical Way	Advice	Corre Caminos
2005
Prospect Park	Royal Fantasy	Atlando
2004
Fair Mix	Marshall	Special Kaldoun
2003
Gruntled	Highdown	Secret Singer
2002
Fair Mix	Jim And Tonic	Cherbon
2001
Jim And Tonic	Visorhill	Cazoulias

2000–1997
2000
Agol Lack	Mont Rocher	Kutub
1999
Chelsea Manor	Agol Lack	Barbola
1998
Lord Of Men	Dragonada	Fado
1997
Turning Wheel	Perfect Vintage	Milford Track

La Coupe de Maisons-Laffitte is a Group 3 flat horse race in France open to thoroughbreds aged three years or older. It is run at Longchamp over a distance of 2,000 metres (about 1¼ miles), and it is scheduled to take place each year in September. The race was run at Maisons-Laffitte until its closure in October 2019.

== History ==
The event was established in 1906, and it was originally called La Coupe d'Or. One of its early trophies was a gold cup with two ivory figures sculpted by Henri Allouard. It was later decided that such valuable trophies would only be awarded to owners who won the race three times within twelve years, but this was never achieved.

La Coupe d'Or was abandoned throughout World War I. There was no running from 1914 to 1918. One person owns the 1908 Gold Cup in its original condition. I also have an original oil painting of Seasick, the horse that won the race. Painting done by Emil Adam in 1908. I will attempt to post pictures of these items shortly.

The race was cancelled twice during World War II, in 1939 and 1940. The trophy scheme was discarded in 1941, and from this point the event was titled La Coupe de Maisons-Laffitte. It was held at Longchamp in 1941 and 1942, and at Le Tremblay in 1944. It went back to Longchamp in 1945, and returned to Maisons-Laffitte in 1946.

The distance of the race has remained unchanged throughout its history.

== Records ==
Most successful horse (2 wins):

- Jocker – 1948, 1949
- Fair Mix – 2002, 2004
- Musical Way – 2006, 2007

Leading jockey (5 wins):

- Roger Poincelet – Cordon Rouge (1943), Un Gaillard (1944), Oural (1946), Dalama (1961), Tout Fait (1965)
- Olivier Peslier – Gunboat Diplomacy (1995), Running Flame (1996), Agol Lack (2000), Prospect Park (2005), Dawn Intello (2021)

Leading trainer (5 wins):

- André Fabre – Nasr El Arab (1988), Tel Quel (1991), Dernier Empereur (1994), Fractional (2014), Agol Lack (2000)
- René Pelat – Cordon Rouge (1943), Oural (1946), Jocker (1948, 1949), Jolly Friar (1954)

Leading owner (4 wins):

- Marcel Boussac – Priam (1945), Pharsale (1952), Dalama (1961), Locris (1970)
- Sheikh Mohammed – Nasr El Arab (1988), Tel Quel (1991), Knifebox (1992), Lord of Men (1998)

== Winners since 1980 ==
Year	Winner	Age	Jockey	Trainer	Owner	Time
1980	Discretion	4	Maurice Philipperon	John Cunnington Jr.	Sir Michael Sobell
1981	Glenorum	4	Alain Lequeux	David Smaga	Helen Stollery
1982	Coquelin	3	Cash Asmussen	François Boutin	Stavros Niarchos
1983	Bylly the Kid	7	Serge Prou	Raymond Touflan	Yves Duffaut
1984	Estrapade	4	Alain Lequeux	Maurice Zilber	Bruce McNall	2:08.60
1985	Palace Music	4	Éric Legrix	Patrick Biancone	Nelson Bunker Hunt	2:02.00
1986	Antheus	4	Gary W. Moore	Criquette Head	Jacques Wertheimer
1987	Tabayaan	3	Yves Saint-Martin	Alain de Royer-Dupré	HH Aga Khan IV
1988	Nasr El Arab	3	Éric Legrix	André Fabre	Sheikh Mohammed	2:01.60
1989	Petrullo	4	Guy Guignard	Richard Casey	C. A. Webster	2:03.80
1990	Dr Somerville	3	Freddy Head	Criquette Head	Maktoum Al Maktoum	2:06.00
1991	Tel Quel	3	Thierry Jarnet	André Fabre	Sheikh Mohammed
1992	Knifebox	4	Darryll Holland	John Gosden	Sheikh Mohammed	2:03.20
1993	Hatoof	4	Walter Swinburn	Criquette Head	Maktoum Al Maktoum	2:08.00
1994	Dernier Empereur	4	Sylvain Guillot	André Fabre	Gary Tanaka	2:04.10
1995	Gunboat Diplomacy	4	Olivier Peslier	Élie Lellouche	Daniel Wildenstein	2:06.20
1996	Running Flame	4	Olivier Peslier	John Hammond	Gary Biszantz	2:06.30
1997	Turning Wheel	4	Cash Asmussen	Dominique Sépulchre	Niarchos Family	2:06.70
1998	Lord of Men	5	Frankie Dettori	John Gosden	Sheikh Mohammed	2:00.80
1999	Chelsea Manor	3	Thierry Thulliez	Pascal Bary	Khalid Abdullah	2:06.10
2000	Agol Lack	4	Olivier Peslier	André Fabre	Sultan Al Kabeer	1:59.90
2001	Jim and Tonic	7	Thierry Thulliez	François Doumen	John Martin	2:05.50
2002	Fair Mix	4	Stéphane Pasquier	Marcel Rolland	Ecurie Week-End	2:03.30
2003	Gruntled	4	Thierry Gillet	John Hammond	Ecurie Chalhoub	2:01.60
2004	Fair Mix	6	Stéphane Pasquier	Marcel Rolland	Mrs Joseph Shalam	1:59.40
2005	Prospect Park	4	Olivier Peslier	Carlos Laffon-Parias	Wertheimer et Frère	2:05.40
2006	Musical Way	4	Ronan Thomas	Philippe van de Poele	S. Constantinidis	1:59.70
2007	Musical Way	5	Ronan Thomas	Philippe van de Poele	S. Constantinidis	2:03.20
2008	Pallodio	3	Davy Bonilla	John Hammond	Anne-Marie Springer	2:04.70
2009	Chinchon	4	Gérald Mossé	Carlos Laffon-Parias	SARL Darpat France	2:01.90
2010	Akarlina	4	Thierry Thulliez	Nicolas Clément	Nicolas Clément	2:07.20
2011	One Clever Cat	5	Christophe Soumillon	Tony Clout	Patrick Hendrickx	2:03.10
2012	Maxios	4	Stéphane Pasquier	Jonathan Pease	Niarchos Family	2:03.30
2013	Cirrus des Aigles	7	Christophe Soumillon	Corine Barande-Barbe	Jean-Claude Dupouy	2:11.19
2014	Fractional	5	Maxime Guyon	André Fabre	Godolphin	2:06.35
2015	Gailo Chop	4	Christophe Soumillon	Antoine de Watrigant	OTI Management Pty Ltd	2:03.06
2016	Banzari	4	Alexis Badel	Henri-François Devin	Rebecca Hillen	2:09.58
2017	Garlingari	6	Christophe Soumillon	Corine Barande-Barbe	Corine Barande-Barbe	2:07.20
2018	Golden Legend	4	Alexis Badel	Henri-François Devin	Mme Henri Devin	2:00.36
2019	Villa Rosa	4	Mickael Barzalona	Henri-François Devin	Mme Henri Devin	2:05.09
2020	Glycon	4	Cristian Demuro	Jean-Claude Rouget	Scea Haras De Saint Pair	2:05.77
2021	Dawn Intello	4	Olivier Peslier	Andreas Schütz	AB Racing & Ecurie Ades Hazan	2:08.22
2022	Monty	7	Gérald Mossé	Andreas Schütz	AB Racing & Ecurie Ades Hazan	2:06.08
2023	Naranco	4	Vaclav Janacek	G Arizkorreta Elosegui	Horses & Berries SL	2:03.29
2024	Certain Lad	8	George Bass	Jack Channon	C R Hirst	2:08.94

== Earlier winners ==
- 1906: Maintenon
- 1907: Ben
- 1908: Sea Sick
- 1909: Syphon
- 1910: Le Rubicon
- 1911: Cadet Roussel
- 1912: Martial
- 1913: Nimbus
- 1914–18: no race
- 1919: Bambino
- 1920: Le Rapin
- 1921: Harpocrate
- 1922: Bahadur
- 1923: Scopas
- 1924: Scaramouche
- 1925: Ptolemy
- 1926: Apelle
- 1927: Iberia
- 1928: Javelot
- 1929: Kantara
- 1930: Parth for Ever
- 1931: Sans Ame
- 1932: Jus de Raisin ^{1}
- 1933: Magnus
- 1934: Sa Parade
- 1935: Rarity
- 1936: Davout
- 1937: Frexo
- 1938: Khasnadar
- 1939–40: no race
- 1941: Triancourt
- 1942: Fair Love
- 1943: Cordon Rouge
- 1944: Un Gaillard
- 1945: Priam
- 1946: Oural
- 1947: L'Imperial
- 1948: Jocker
- 1949: Jocker
- 1950: Violoncelle
- 1951:
- 1952: Pharsale
- 1953: Cosmos
- 1954: Jolly Friar
- 1955: The Parson
- 1956: Cobetto
- 1957: Franc Luron
- 1958: Fric
- 1959:
- 1960: Point d'Amour
- 1961: Dalama
- 1962: Djebel Traffic
- 1963: Monade
- 1964: Trac / Visavis ^{2}
- 1965: Tout Fait
- 1966: Prominer / Red Vagabonde ^{2}
- 1967: A Tempo
- 1968: Batitu
- 1969: Karabas
- 1970: Locris
- 1971: Gold Rod
- 1972: Tratteggio
- 1973: Amadou
- 1974: Wittgenstein
- 1975: Trepan
- 1976: Iron Duke
- 1977: Dona Barod
- 1978: Rusticaro
- 1979: Look Fast

^{1} The 1932 race finished as a dead-heat between Fenolo and Jus de Raisin, but a winner was decided by a run-off.
^{2} The 1964 and 1966 races were dead-heats and have joint winners.

== See also ==
- List of French flat horse races
- Recurring sporting events established in 1906 – this race is included under its original title, La Coupe d'Or.
