= 2004 Prix de l'Arc de Triomphe =

- Location: Longchamp Racecourse
- Date: October 3, 2004
- Winning horse: Bago

The 2004 Prix de l'Arc de Triomphe was a horse race held at Longchamp on Sunday 3 October 2004. It was the 83rd running of the Prix de l'Arc de Triomphe.

The winner was Bago, a three-year-old colt trained in France by Jonathan Pease. The winning jockey was Thierry Gillet.

== Race details ==
- Sponsor: Groupe Lucien Barrière
- Purse: €1,600,000; First prize: €914,240
- Going: Good
- Distance: 2,400 metres
- Number of runners: 19
- Winner's time: 2m 25.0s

== Full result ==
Pos.	Marg.	Horse	Age	Jockey	Trainer (Country)
1		Bago	3	Thierry Gillet	Jonathan Pease (FR)
2	½	Cherry Mix	3	Christophe Soumillon	André Fabre (FR)
3	1	Ouija Board	3	Johnny Murtagh	Ed Dunlop (GB)
4	2	Acropolis	3	Jamie Spencer	Aidan O'Brien (IRE)
5	shd	North Light	3	Kieren Fallon	Sir Michael Stoute (GB)
6	½	Vallee Enchantee	4	Stéphane Pasquier	Élie Lellouche (FR)
7	snk	Latice	3	Michael Kinane	Jean-Marie Béguigné (FR)
8	2½	Silverskaya	3	Ioritz Mendizabal	Jean-Claude Rouget (FR)
9	½	Warrsan	6	Kerrin McEvoy	Clive Brittain (GB)
10	shd	Valixir	3	Éric Legrix	André Fabre (FR)
11	nk	Execute	7	Dominique Boeuf	John Hammond (FR)
12	½	Blue Canari	3	Christophe Lemaire	Pascal Bary (FR)
13	½	Pride	4	Thierry Jarnet	Alain de Royer-Dupré (FR)
14	snk	Imperial Dancer	6	Ted Durcan	Mick Channon (GB)
15	hd	Mamool	5	Frankie Dettori	Saeed bin Suroor (GB)
16	½	Prospect Park	3	Olivier Peslier	Carlos Laffon-Parias (FR)
17	8	Tap Dance City	7	Tetsuzo Sato	Shozo Sasaki (JPN)
18	1½	Grey Swallow	3	Pat Smullen	Dermot Weld (IRE)
19	10	Policy Maker	4	Thierry Thulliez	Élie Lellouche (FR)

- Abbreviations: shd = short-head; hd = head; snk = short-neck; nk = neck

== Winner's details ==
Further details of the winner, Bago.

- Sex: Colt
- Foaled: 3 February 2001
- Country: France
- Sire: Nashwan; Dam: Moonlight's Box (Nureyev)
- Owner / Breeder: Niarchos Family
