= Cherry Mix =

French Thoroughbred racehorse

- Sire: Linamix
- Grandsire: Mendez
- Dam: Cherry Moon
- Damsire: Quiet American
- Sex: Stallion
- Foaled: 15 February 2001
- Country: France
- Colour: Grey
- Breeder: Lagardère Elevage
- Owner: Lagardere Family; Godolphin
- Trainer: André Fabre; Saeed bin Suroor
- Record: 25: 6-4-3
- Earnings: £764,626

Major wins
- Prix Frederic de Lagrange (2004); Grand Prix de Deauville (2004); Gran Premio del Jockey Club (2005); Rheinland-Pokal (2006); Premio Roma (2006)

Cherry Mix (foaled 15 February 2001) was a French Thoroughbred racehorse and sire. After winning one minor race as a juvenile in 2003 he made steady progress in the following year. He was placed in the Prix Noailles and the Prix Hocquart and went on to win both the Prix Frederic de Lagrange and the Grand Prix de Deauville before producing his best performance when narrowly beaten in the Prix de l'Arc de Triomphe. When transferred to Godolphin in 2005 he won the Gran Premio del Jockey Club. In 2006 he recorded further major wins in the Rheinland-Pokal and the Premio Roma. He was retired from racing at the end of the 2007 season.

== Background ==
Cherry Mix was a grey horse bred by Lagardere Elevage, a company which managed the bloodstock interests of Jean-Luc Lagardère. Lagardère died in March 2003 and the colt passed into the ownership of the Lagardère family. He was sent into training with André Fabre.

He inherited his grey coat from his sire Linamix, who won the Poule d'Essai des Poulains for Lagardere in 1990 and went on to sire the Prix de l'Arc de Triomphe winner Sagamix. Cherry Mix's dam Cherry Moon was bred in California and won four minor races from 21 starts in North America. She was descended from the American broodmare Fairy Day, making her a distant relative of the Belmont Stakes winner Summing.

== Racing career ==
=== 2003: two-year-old season ===
Cherry Mix began his racing career on 28 September when he started 1.5/1 favourite in a twelve-runner maiden race over 1600 metres on soft ground at Fontainebleau Racecourse and won by half a length. Two weeks later he attempted to follow up in a minor race at Longchamp Racecourse but was beaten a neck into second place by Barnacle.

=== 2004: three-year-old season ===
Cherry Mix's second season began when he finished third when favourite for the Listed Prix Maurice Caillault over 2100 metres at Saint-Cloud Racecourse on 18 March. He then ran second to Voix du Nord in the Prix Noailles at Longchamp in April and third behind Lord du Sud in the Prix Hocquart at the same track in May. On 4 July he started odds-on favourite for the Listed Prix Auriban at Saint-Cloud but was beaten a neck by Staramix. Twenty days later the colt was made 1.6/1 favourite against eight opponents for the Listed Prix Frederic de Lagrange over 2400 metres at Vichy. Ridden by Thierry Gillet he tracked the front-running Anabaa Republic before taking the lead 400 metres from the finish and ran on well to win by three lengths.

Gillet was again in the saddle when Cherry Mix was stepped back up to Group 2 level and matched against older horses in the Grand Prix de Deauville over 2500 metres on heavy ground at Deauville Racecourse on 29 August. He started at odds of 8/1 in an eight-runner field which included Fair Mix (Prix Ganay), Martaline (Prix Maurice de Nieuil) and Bailador (Grand Prix de Vichy). After racing towards the rear, Cherry Mix went to the front 200 metres out and drew away from his opponents to win by four lengths from Martaline.

On 3 October at Longchamp, Cherry Mix, ridden by Christophe Soumillon started a 33/1 outsider for the 2004 Prix de l'Arc de Triomphe. He was always in contention, took the lead in the straight and looked likely to record an upset victory as he opened up a two length advantage. In the final 50 metres however, he was run down by Bago and beaten half a length into second place. The horses finishing behind him included Ouija Board, North Light, Tap Dance City, Warrsan, Blue Canari, Pride and Grey Swallow.

In the 2004 World Thoroughbred Racehorse Rankings, Cherry Mix was given a rating of 125, five pounds the leader Ghostzapper, making him the sixth best racehorse in the world.

=== 2005: four-year-old season ===
Before the start of the 2005 season Cherry Mix was acquired by Sheikh Mohammed's Godolphin organisation and was transferred to the stable of Saeed bin Suroor. He was ridden all of his races as a four-year-old by Frankie Dettori. Cherry Mix began his campaign with two unsuccessful starts at Nad Al Sheba Racecourse in Dubai. He ran fourth in the third round of the Al Maktoum Challenge on 5 March and came home unplaced behind Phoenix Reach in the Sheema Classic three weeks later.

After an absence of more than five months Cherry Mix returned to the track in Germany on 4 September when he was made favourite for the Grosser Preis von Baden but finished fifth of the nine runners behind Warrsan. Starting a 28/1 outsider in his second bid to win the Prix de l'Arc de Triomphe on 2 October he reached second place in the straight before fading badly and coming home twelfth behind Hurricane Run. Two weeks after his failure at Longchamp the colt was sent to Italy and started the 1.6/1 favourite for the Gran Premio del Jockey Club over 2400 metres at San Siro Racecourse in Milan. He went to the front after 800 metres and drew away in the straight to win "comfortably" by two lengths from the German colt Salutino.

On his final run of 2005 Cherry Mix was shipped to Sha Tin Racecourse to contest the Hong Kong Vase on 11 December. He raced in second place for most of the way but dropped away in the straight and came home ninth of the twelve runners behind Ouija Board.

In the 2005 World Thoroughbred Racehorse Rankings Cherry Mix was rated 113 in the world with a rating of 115.

=== 2006: five-year-old season ===
Cherry Mix began his 2006 season in Dubai, finishing unplaced in the Dubai City of Gold on 2 March. On returning to Europe he was unplaced in the Yorkshire Cup in May and then finished last of the six runners behind Hurricane Run in the King George VI and Queen Elizabeth Stakes at Ascot Racecourse in July. He was then sent to Germany for the Group 1 Rheinland-Pokal at Cologne on 13 August and started the 3.8/1 third choice in the betting behind Collier Hill and the Hansa-Preis winner Egerton. Ridden by the Australian jockey Kerrin McEvoy he tracked the front-running Academy Reward as the pair opened up a lead of eight lengths on the field. He passed the pacemaker 400 metres from the finish and maintained his advantage to win by four lengths from Fracas. In the International Stakes nine days later at York Racecourse he made most of the running but faded in the last quarter mile and finished sixth of the seven runners behind Notnowcato.

For his last two races of 2006 Cherry Mix was campaigned in Italy again. On 15 October he attempted to repeat his 2005 success in the Gran Premio del Jockey Club but after leading for most of the way he was overtaken approaching the last 200 metres and finished third behind Laverock and Fair Nashwan. At Capannelle Racecourse in Rome over 2000 metres on 5 November the horse was ridden by Ted Durcan and started at odds of 3.4/1 in a ten-runner field for the Premio Roma. The German horse Soldier Hollow, winner of the race for the last two years started favourite, while the other runners included Fair Nashwan, Distant Way (Premio Presidente della Repubblica), Emily Bronte (Prix des Réservoirs) and Hattan (Chester Vase). Cherry Mix led from the start and was never seriously challenged, coming home four lengths clear of Hattan.

=== 2007: six-year-old season ===
Cherry Mix returned as a six-year-old in 2007 but failed to win or place in three races. He finished fourth to Distant Way in the Premio Presidente della Repubblica at Rome in May and was then stepped up in distance a month later for the Ascot Gold Cup in which he came home eighth behind Yeats. After a break of over four months he returned for the Premio Roma on 4 November and finished fourth behind the British-trained four-year-old Pressing.

== Pedigree ==
Pedigree of Cherry Mix (FR), grey stallion, 2001
Sire Linamix (GB) 1987	Mendez; 1981	Bellypha (IRE)	Lyphard (USA)
Sire Linamix (GB) 1987	Mendez; 1981	Bellypha (IRE)	Belga (FR)
Sire Linamix (GB) 1987	Mendez; 1981	Miss Carina	Caro (IRE)
Sire Linamix (GB) 1987	Mendez; 1981	Miss Carina	Miss Pia (USA)
Sire Linamix (GB) 1987	Lunadix; 1972	Breton (GB)	Relko
Sire Linamix (GB) 1987	Lunadix; 1972	Breton (GB)	La Melba
Sire Linamix (GB) 1987	Lunadix; 1972	Lutine (GB)	Alcide
Sire Linamix (GB) 1987	Lunadix; 1972	Lutine (GB)	Mona
Dam Cherry Moon (USA) 1995	Quiet American; 1986	Fappiano	Mr. Prospector
Dam Cherry Moon (USA) 1995	Quiet American; 1986	Fappiano	Killaloe
Dam Cherry Moon (USA) 1995	Quiet American; 1986	Demure	Dr Fager
Dam Cherry Moon (USA) 1995	Quiet American; 1986	Demure	Quiet Charm
Dam Cherry Moon (USA) 1995	Datsdawatitis; 1989	Known Fact	In Reality
Dam Cherry Moon (USA) 1995	Datsdawatitis; 1989	Known Fact	Tamerett
Dam Cherry Moon (USA) 1995	Datsdawatitis; 1989	Baton Twirler	Reverse
Dam Cherry Moon (USA) 1995	Datsdawatitis; 1989	Baton Twirler	Dixie B (family: 1-g)
