= Latice =

Irish-bred racehorse

- Sire: Inchinor
- Grandsire: Ahonoora
- Dam: Laramie
- Damsire: Gulch
- Sex: Mare
- Foaled: 9 March 2001
- Country: Ireland
- Colour: Chestnut
- Breeder: Petra Bloodstock
- Owner: Enrico Ciampi; George W. Strawbridge Jr.
- Trainer: Jean-Marie Béguigné; Jonathan Sheppard
- Record: 18: 6-3-2
- Earnings: $797,391 (Note: equivalent to $1.2 million in 2024)

Major wins
- Prix de Condé (2003); Prix Vanteaux (2004); Prix de Diane (2004); Waya Stakes (2005)

Latice (foaled 9 March 2001) was an Irish-bred Thoroughbred racehorse and broodmare. As a two-year-old in 2003, she showed great promise by winning her first race and then taking the Group 3 Prix de Condé against male opposition. In the following spring, she won the Prix Vanteaux before recording her biggest victory in the Prix de Diane but was unplaced in three subsequent starts that year. In 2005, she was campaigned in North America where she won the Waya Stakes and running second in the E. P. Taylor Stakes. She won one minor race in 2006 before being retired from racing at the end of the year. As a broodmare, she had some success as a dam of winners.

== Background ==
Latice is a chestnut mare with white blaze bred in Ireland by Petra Bloodstock. As a yearling in August 2002 she was offered for sale at Deauville but failed to reach her reserve price. She was subsequently acquired by Enrico Ciampi and sent into training with Jean-Marie Béguigné at Chantilly in France.

As a daughter of the Hungerford Stakes winner Inchinor, Latice was a product of the Byerley Turk sire line, unlike more than 95% of modern thoroughbreds, who descend directly from the Darley Arabian. Inchinor, who died in 2003, sired over five hundred other winners including Notnowcato, Summoner and Cape of Good Hope. Latice's dam Laramie showed no racing ability in a brief track career, finishing unplaced in both of her starts, but did much better as a broodmare, producing Lawman and the Prix du Palais Royal winner Satri. She was descended from Picture Play who won the 1000 Guineas in 1944 and was the female-line ancestor of numerous major winners.

== Racing career ==
=== 2003: two-year-old season ===
Latice made her racecourse debut in a maiden race over 1600 metres on good-to-soft ground at Fontainebleau Racecourse on 8 September in which she started the 2.3/1 favourite in a four-runner field. Ridden by Ioritz Mendizabal she looked unlikely to obtain a clear run before breaking through along the rail in the last 150 metres to win by three quarters of a length from Siberian Highness. On 19 October the filly was moved up in class and matched against male opposition in the Group 3 Prix de Condé over 1800 metres at Longchamp Racecourse. Starting a 12.5/1 outsider she was settled towards the rear of the six-runner field by Christophe Lemaire before producing a strong late run to overtake Voix du Nord 50 metres from the finish and win by half a length. The form of the race was boosted when Voix du Nord won the Group 1 Critérium de Saint-Cloud in November.

=== 2004: three-year-old season ===
On her first run as a three-year-old Latice was ridden by Christophe Soumillon when she started the 0.7/1 favourite for the Group 3 Prix Vanteaux over 1800 metres on very soft ground at Longchamp on 2 May. After tracking the leaders she took the lead approaching the last 200 metres and kept on well to win by a length from Asti with Green Swallow in third.

Soumillon was again in the saddle when the filly started the 2.75/1 favourite for the Group 1 Prix de Diane over 2100 meters at Chantilly Racecourse on 13 June. Her sixteen opponents included Torrestrella (winner of the Poule d'Essai des Pouliches), Asti, Alexander Goldrun, Ask For the Moon (Prix Saint-Alary), Grey Lilas (Prix de la Grotte), Colony Band (Prix Melisande), Menhoubah (Oaks d'Italia) and Steel Princess (Prix Cléopâtre). Latice was restrained at the rear of the field until turning into the straight when she began to make rapid progress on the outside. Despite drifting to the right she overtook Grey Lilas 150 metres from the finish and won by three quarters of a length from Millionaia. After the race Béguigné said: "That was fantastic and Latice is an exceptional filly. She has an amazing ability to accelerate and stays. I was feeling confident all through the race. For a long time I knew that I had a Prix de Diane winner in my stable. Latice will now have a rest and we will bring her back for the autumn with the Arc de Triomphe in mind."

After a break of almost three months Latice returned in the Prix Vermeille on 12 September over 2400 metres at Longchamp when she was matched against older fillies and mares. Starting the 1.1/1 favourite she took the lead in the straight but was overtaken in the last 100 metres and finished eighth in a blanket finish, beaten less than two lengths by the four-year-old winner Sweet Stream. On 3 October the filly started a 28/1 outsider for the Prix de l'Arc de Triomphe over the same course and distance. Ridden by Mick Kinane she raced in mid-division before staying on well in the straight to come home seventh of the nineteen runners behind Bago. For her final run of the year Latice was sent to Sha Tin Racecourse to contest the Hong Kong Cup on 12 December but made little impact and finished tenth behind Alexander Goldrun.

In the 2004 World Thoroughbred Racehorse Rankings, Latice was given a rating of 117, making her the fifty-seventh best racehorse in the world and the third best three-year-old filly behind Ouija Board and Attraction.

In December Latice was scheduled to be auctioned at Tattersalls but was acquired privately by George W. Strawbridge Jr.

=== 2005: four-year-old season ===
For the 2005 season, Latice was transferred to race in the United States where she was trained by Jonathan Sheppard and raced in the colours of Strawbridge's Augustin Stable. On her North American debut the filly started favourite for the Waya Stakes over one and a half miles at Saratoga Race Course in August and won by one and three quarter lengths having taken the lead on the far turn. After running third behind Spotlight and With Affection when carrying top weight of 123 pounds in the Cicada Stakes at Delaware Park Racetrack Latice was stepped up in class for the E. P. Taylor Stakes at Woodbine Racetrack on 23 October. Ridden by José Santos she took the lead in the straight but was overtaken in the closing stages and beaten half a length by Honey Ryder. On her final race of the year Latice started favourite for the Long Island Handicap at Aqueduct Racetrack on 5 November but came home fifth behind Olaya.

=== 2006: five-year-old season ===
Latice began her fourth campaign in an allowance race on 15 April over one mile at Keeneland in which she was ridden by John Velasquez and won by half a length from Rich In Spirit. She then finished sixth to Honey Ryder in the Sheepshead Bay Handicap at Belmont Park in May, second to Film Maker in the All Along Stakes at Colonial Downs in June and third to Honey Ryder in the Robert G. Dick Memorial Stakes at Delaware Park in July. On 4 September Latice finished second to Noble Stella in the Glens Falls Stakes at Saratoga and then contested her second E. P. Taylor Stakes in which she came home fifth of the ten runners behind Arravale.

After coming home ninth in the April Run Stakes at Laurel Park on 25 November Latice was retired from racing. Sheppard commented "She came out of her last race bleeding from the sole of one of her feet and was lame. With what she accomplished, it was best to send her home to be a broodmare."

== Breeding record ==
At the end of her racing career Latice was retired to become a broodmare. She produced at least seven foals and four winners:

- Love of Flying, a bay colt (later gelded), foaled in 2008, sired by Forestry. Won three races.
- Fencing, bay colt (gelded), 2009, by Street Cry. Won two races, namely the Washington Singer Stakes and the Paradise Stakes.
- Obsidian, bay colt (gelded), 2011, by Street Cry. Won three races.
- Signed Sealed, chestnut colt, 2012, by Giant's Causeway. Won one race.
- Prose Poem, bay filly, 2013, by Street Cry. Failed to win in six races.
- Lenoire, bay filly, 2014, by Galileo. Failed to win in six races.
- Deacon, bay colt, 2016, by Dansili. Failed to win in six races.

== Pedigree ==
Pedigree of Latice (IRE), chestnut mare, 2001
Sire Inchinor (GB) 1990	Ahonoora (GB); 1975	Lorenzaccio	Klairon (FR)
Sire Inchinor (GB) 1990	Ahonoora (GB); 1975	Lorenzaccio	Phoenissa
Sire Inchinor (GB) 1990	Ahonoora (GB); 1975	Helen Nichols	Martial (IRE)
Sire Inchinor (GB) 1990	Ahonoora (GB); 1975	Helen Nichols	Quaker Girl
Sire Inchinor (GB) 1990	Inchmurrin (IRE); 1985	Lomond (USA)	Northern Dancer (CAN)
Sire Inchinor (GB) 1990	Inchmurrin (IRE); 1985	Lomond (USA)	My Charmer
Sire Inchinor (GB) 1990	Inchmurrin (IRE); 1985	On Show (GB)	Welsh Pageant (FR)
Sire Inchinor (GB) 1990	Inchmurrin (IRE); 1985	On Show (GB)	African Dancer
Dam Laramie (USA) 1994	Gulch (USA); 1984	Mr. Prospector	Raise a Native
Dam Laramie (USA) 1994	Gulch (USA); 1984	Mr. Prospector	Gold Digger
Dam Laramie (USA) 1994	Gulch (USA); 1984	Jameela	Rambunctious
Dam Laramie (USA) 1994	Gulch (USA); 1984	Jameela	Asbury Mary
Dam Laramie (USA) 1994	Light the Lights (FR); 1985	Shirley Heights (GB)	Mill Reef (USA)
Dam Laramie (USA) 1994	Light the Lights (FR); 1985	Shirley Heights (GB)	Hardiemma
Dam Laramie (USA) 1994	Light the Lights (FR); 1985	Lighted Glory (USA)	Nijinsky (CAN)
Dam Laramie (USA) 1994	Light the Lights (FR); 1985	Lighted Glory (USA)	Lighted Lamp (Family: 1-s)
