= Prix de Pomone =

Prix Alec Head (prix de Pomone)
- Class: Group 2
- Location: Deauville Racecourse; Deauville, France
- Inaugurated: 1920
- Race type: Flat / Thoroughbred
- Sponsor: Jra
- Website: france-galop.com

Race information
- Distance: 2,500 metres (1m 4½f)
- Surface: Turf
- Track: Right-handed
- Qualification: Three-years-old and up fillies & mares exc. G1 winners this year
- Weight: 55 kg (3yo); 59 kg (4yo+); Penalties; 2 kg for Group 2 winners * 2 kg if two Group 3 wins * * since January 1
- Purse: €130,000 (2021); 1st: €74,100

Prix de Pomone
2025
Latakia	Le Combat Continue	Bibbiena

Previous years
2024
Aventure	Trevaunance	One Evening
2023
Melo Melo	Baiykara	Ottery
2022
Sea La Rosa	Love Child	Glenartney
2021
Raabihah	Joie De Soir	Valia

2020-2011
2020
Ebaiyra	Spirit Of Appin	Grand Glory
2019
Dame Malliot	Love So Deep	Klassique
2018
Kitesurf	Palombe	God Given
2017
Bateel	Traffic Jam	Abingdon
2016
Highlands Queen	Mango Tango	Contribution
2015
Baino Hope	Cocktail Queen	Frine
2014
Star Lahib	Chalnetta	Savanne
2013
La Pomme D'Amour	Chalnetta	Emirates Queen
2012
La Pomme D'Amour	Shimmering Surf	Dalkala
2011
Sarah Lynx	Miss Crissy	Shamanova

2010–2001
2010
Peinture Rare	High Heeled	Burn The Breeze
2009
Armure	Shemima	Tres Rapide
2008
Avanti Polonia	Turfrose	Believe Me
2007
Macleya	Pearl Sky	Montare
2006
Freedonia	Montare	Exhibit One
2005
Diamond Tango	Guadalajara	Russian Hill
2004
Lune D'Or	Hidden Hope	Sweet Stream
2003
Vallee Enchantee	Treble Heights	Mandela
2002
Bernimixa	Shadow Dancing	Turn To Black
2001
Abitara	Head In The Clouds	Super Tassa

2000–1990
2000
Interlude	Sadler's Flag	Aubergade
1999
Bimbola	Innuendo	Native Justice
1998
Leggera	Tuning	Rambling Rose
1997
Whitewater Affair	Otaiti	Legend Maker
1996
Helen Of Spain	Camporese	Spout
1995
Sunrise Song	Fanjica	L'Ile Tudy
1994
Bright Moon	Wandesta	Molesnes
1993
Bright Moon	Spring	Oakmead
1992
Magic Night	Sought Out	Always Friendly
1991
Patricia	Spendomania	Danae De Brule
1990
Whitehaven	Tycana	Indian Queen

The Prix de Pomone is a Group 2 flat horse race in France open to thoroughbred fillies and mares aged three years or older. It is run at Deauville over a distance of 2,500 metres (about 1 mile and 4½ furlongs), and it is scheduled to take place each year in August.

== History ==
The event is named after Pomona, the Roman goddess of fruit trees, gardens and orchards. It was established in 1920, and it was originally contested over 2,400 metres.

The race was cancelled in 1940, and it was held at Maisons-Laffitte from 1941 to 1943. It was cancelled again in 1944, and run once more at Maisons-Laffitte before returning to Deauville in 1946. It was extended to 2,600 metres in 1963.

The present system of race grading was introduced in 1971, and the Prix de Pomone was initially classed at Group 3 level. It was increased to 2,700 metres in 1973, and promoted to Group 2 status in 1983. It was cut to 2,500 metres in 2004.

== Records ==
Most successful horse (2 wins):

- Zalataia – 1982, 1983
- Bright Moon – 1993, 1994

Leading jockey (6 wins):

- Freddy Head – Moquerie (1976, dead-heat), Gold River (1980), Zalataia (1982, 1983), Marie de Litz (1984), Light the Lights (1988)
- Thierry Jarnet – Bright Moon (1993, 1994), Helen of Spain (1996), Interlude (2000), Abitara (2001), Lune d'Or (2004)

Leading trainer (14 wins):

- André Fabre – Zalataia (1982, 1983), Galla Placidia (1985), Colorado Dancer (1989), Whitehaven (1990), Bright Moon (1993, 1994), Helen of Spain (1996), Bernimixa (2002), Diamond Tango (2005), Macleya (2007), La Pomme d'Amour (2012, 2013), Kitesurf (2018)

Leading owner (6 wins):

- Guy de Rothschild – Agace (1955), Louvette (1958), Marella (1960), Isoline (1965), Skelda (1971), Lady Berry (1973)

== Winners since 1980 ==
Year	Winner	Age	Jockey	Trainer	Owner	Time
1980	Gold River	3	Freddy Head	Alec Head	Jacques Wertheimer	3:00.8
1981	April Run	3	Philippe Paquet	François Boutin	Diana Firestone	3:01.8
1982	Zalataia	3	Freddy Head	André Fabre	Francis Baral
1983	Zalataia	4	Freddy Head	André Fabre	Francis Baral	3:04.0
1984	Marie de Litz	4	Freddy Head	Robert Collet	Sultan Al Kabeer	3:01.3
1985	Galla Placidia	3	Lester Piggott	André Fabre	William Kazan	3:12.6
1986	Persona	4	Alfred Gibert	Pascal Bary	Jean-Louis Bouchard	3:07.6
1987	River Memories	3	Alain Lequeux	Robert Collet	Alan Clore	3:02.6
1988	Light the Lights	3	Freddy Head	François Boutin	Chryss Goulandris	3:01.0
1989	Colorado Dancer	3	Cash Asmussen	André Fabre	Sheikh Mohammed	3:06.5
1990	Whitehaven	3	Cash Asmussen	André Fabre	Sheikh Mohammed	3:05.7
1991	Patricia	3	Steve Cauthen	Henry Cecil	Charles St George	3:04.9
1992	Magic Night	4	Alain Badel	Philippe Demercastel	Hideo Yokoyama	3:07.1
1993	Bright Moon	3	Thierry Jarnet	André Fabre	Daniel Wildenstein	2:58.0
1994	Bright Moon	4	Thierry Jarnet	André Fabre	Daniel Wildenstein	2:57.9
1995	Sunrise Song	4	Gérald Mossé	François Doumen	Jean Percepied	2:59.4
1996	Helen of Spain	4	Thierry Jarnet	André Fabre	Sheikh Mohammed	3:00.9
1997	Whitewater Affair	4	John Reid	Michael Stoute	John Greetham	3:03.6
1998	Leggera	3	Olivier Doleuze	John Dunlop	Hildegard Focke	3:02.0
1999	Bimbola	5	Thierry Gillet	J. Bertran de Balanda	Tullio Attias	2:56.3
2000	Interlude	3	Thierry Jarnet	Sir Michael Stoute	Queen Elizabeth II	3:03.5
2001	Abitara	5	Thierry Jarnet	Andreas Wöhler	Gestüt Ittlingen	3:06.0
2002	Bernimixa	3	Olivier Peslier	André Fabre	Jean-Luc Lagardère	3:02.8
2003	Vallee Enchantee	3	Dominique Boeuf	Élie Lellouche	Ecurie Wildenstein	3:02.9
2004	Lune d'Or	3	Thierry Jarnet	Richard Gibson	Mrs Paul de Moussac	2:38.9
2005	Diamond Tango	4	Christophe Soumillon	André Fabre	HH Aga Khan IV	2:46.3
2006	Freedonia	4	Thierry Gillet	John Hammond	Niarchos Family	2:39.2
2007	Macleya	5	Stéphane Pasquier	André Fabre	Richard C. Thompson	2:40.9
2008	Avanti Polonia	4	Davy Bonilla	Freddy Head	Ingeborg von Schubert	2:47.1
2009	Armure	4	Gérald Mossé	Alain de Royer-Dupré	Haras de Saint Pair	2:40.0
2010	Peinture Rare	4	Anthony Crastus	Élie Lellouche	Ecurie Wildenstein	2:53.1
2011	Sarah Lynx	4	Christophe Soumillon	John Hammond	Amélie Ehrnrooth	2:53.7
2012	La Pomme d'Amour	4	Maxime Guyon	André Fabre	Guy Reed	2:42.2
2013	La Pomme d'Amour	5	Flavien Prat	André Fabre	Executors of Guy Reed	2:42.45
2014	Star Lahib	5	Umberto Rispoli	Andreas Wohler	Jaber Abdullah	2:50.13
2015	Baino Hope	4	Christophe Soumillon	Jean-Claude Rouget	Ecurie I M Fares	2:43.00
2016	Highlands Queen	3	Stéphane Pasquier	Yohann Gourraud	Kerjean & Kumin	2:45.57
2017	Bateel	5	Pierre-Charles Boudot	Francis-Henri Graffard	Al Asayl Bloodstock Ltd	2:39.54
2018	Kitesurf	4	Mickael Barzalona	André Fabre	Godolphin	2:43.87
2019	Dame Malliot	3	Frankie Dettori	Ed Vaughan	Anthony Oppenheimer	2:46.23
2020	Ebaiyra	3	Christophe Soumillon	Alain de Royer-Dupré	HH Aga Khan IV	2:51.24
2021	Raabihah	4	Cristian Demuro	Jean-Claude Rouget	Shadwell France	2:43.46
2022	Sea La Rosa	4	Tom Marquand	William Haggas	Sunderland Holding Inc	2:44.98
2023	Melo Melo	4	Mickael Barzalona	Francis-Henri Graffard	Ecurie Ama Zingteam	2:48.22
2024	Aventure	3	Stephane Pasquier	Christophe Ferland	Wertheimer et Frère	2:52.03
2025	Latakia	4	Christophe Soumillon	Francis-Henri Graffard	Juddmonte	2:42.16
2026	Rabbit's Foot	4	Mickael Barzalona	Francis-Henri Graffard	White Birch Farm	2:44.44

== Earlier winners ==
- 1920: La Brume
- 1921: Marvel
- 1922: Honeysuckle
- 1923: Chantepie
- 1924: Quoi
- 1925: Javoton
- 1926: Miquette
- 1927: La Moldava
- 1928: Bellecour
- 1929: La Mie au Gue
- 1930: Marylebone
- 1931: Confidence
- 1932: Campaspe
- 1933: Queen of Scots
- 1934: Sa Parade
- 1935: Primrose
- 1936: Birmania
- 1937: Cousine
- 1938: Queen
- 1939: Xamalfi
- 1940: no race
- 1941: Pallas
- 1942: Rengaine
- 1943: Folle Nuit
- 1944: no race
- 1945: Joyeuse Lumiere
- 1946: Fairlane
- 1947: Platiname
- 1948: Phydile
- 1949: Miss Trolla
- 1950: Blue Kiss
- 1951: Arentelle
- 1952: La Mirambule
- 1953: Damaka
- 1954: Caralina
- 1955: Agace
- 1956: Ad Altiora
- 1957: La Malaguena
- 1958: Louvette
- 1959: Patrallora
- 1960: Marella
- 1961: Lezghinka
- 1962: Psychose
- 1963: Monade
- 1964: Frisca
- 1965: Isoline
- 1966: Bergame
- 1967: Modeste
- 1968: Valya
- 1969: Roseliere
- 1970: Santa Tina
- 1971: Skelda
- 1972: Felicite
- 1973: Lady Berry
- 1974: Gazolina
- 1975: Paddy's Princess
- 1976: Moquerie / Sweet Rhapsody *
- 1977: Proud Event
- 1978: Fabuleux Jane
- 1979: Bolsa

* The 1976 race was a dead-heat and has joint winners.

== See also ==
- List of French flat horse races
