= Artie Schiller =

American-bred Thoroughbred racehorse

- Sire: El Prado
- Grandsire: Sadler's Wells
- Dam: Hidden Light
- Damsire: Majestic Light
- Sex: Stallion
- Foaled: 2001
- Country: United States
- Colour: Bay
- Breeder: Haras du Mezeray
- Owner: Timber Bay Farm & Denise Walsh
- Trainer: James A. Jerkens
- Record: 22: 10-5-3
- Earnings: $2,088,853

Major wins
- Hall of Fame Handicap (2004); Hill Prince Stakes (2004); Woodlawn Stakes (2004); Jamaica Handicap (2004); Maker's Mark Mile Stakes (2005); Bernard Baruch Handicap (2005) Breeders' Cup wins: Breeders' Cup Mile (2005)
- Last updated on October 20, 2008

Artie Schiller (foaled April 23, 2001 in Kentucky) is a retired American Thoroughbred racehorse. Bred by Haras du Mezeray of Ticheville, Orne in Lower Normandy, France, he was out of the mare Hidden Light, a daughter of multiple Grade I winner, Majestic Light. His sire was El Prado, the 1991 Irish Champion Two-Year-Old and who became the Leading sire in North America in 2002.

A turf specialist, Artie Schiller was purchased and raced by William Entenmann of Timber Bay Farm and his daughter Denise Walsh, and was named after Entenmann's childhood friend. He was conditioned for racing by Jimmy Jerkens. At age two the colt won two of his five starts then at age three won five of eight outings including the Jamaica Handicap in which he set a new Belmont Park course record for nine furlongs. At Lone Star Park in Grand Prairie, Texas, he was sent off as the betting favorite for the 2004 Breeders' Cup Mile but finished twelfth in the fourteen-horse field.

Racing at age four, Artie Schiller had his best earnings year and most important career win. After winning the 2005 Maker's Mark Mile Stakes and the Bernard Baruch Handicap, he was sent to Belmont Park where under jockey Garrett Gomez he won the Breeders' Cup Mile, defeating runner-up Leroidesanimaux by nearly two lengths. At age five, he made three starts without a win but earned a second in the 2006 Maker's Mark Mile Stakes and a third in the Dixie Stakes.

Artie Schiller was retired from racing in August 2006 and entered stud for the 2007 season at Hurricane Hall in Lexington, Kentucky. Afterward, he was moved to Paul's Mills, KY, then to WinStar Farm, Versailles, KY, while shuttling to Australia. In 2017 he was permanently stationed in Australia and stood at Independent Stallion Station & Emirates Park Stud before relocating to Stockwell Thoroughbreds in Diggers Rest, Victoria, where he currently stands.

== Stud record ==
Artie Schiller's descendants include:

c = colt, f = filly

Foaled	Name	Sex	Major Wins
2008	Mr. Commons	c	Arcadia Handicap, Mathis Brothers Mile, Oceanside Stakes
2008	Bear's Chill	c	Queenston Stakes
2008	Anne's Beauty	c	Ontario Colleen Stakes, Duchess Stakes, Glorious Song Stakes
2009	Big Bane Theory	c	City of Hope Mile Stakes
2009	Hammer's Terror	c	Charlie Barley Stakes
2009	Blingo	c	San Antonio Handicap
2011	We Miss Artie	c	Dixiana Breeders' Futurity
2011	My Conquestadory	c	Alcibiades Stakes
2013	Flying Artie	c	Coolmore Stud Stakes
2014	Bowies Hero	c	Eddie Read Stakes, Frank E. Kilroe Mile, Mathis Brothers Mile
2015	Hawkish	c	Cliff Hanger Stakes, Penn Mile Stakes
