= Dernier Empereur =

American-bred Thoroughbred racehorse

- Sire: Trempolino
- Grandsire: Sharpen Up
- Dam: Dear Colleen
- Damsire: In Reality
- Sex: Stallion
- Foaled: 5 February 1990
- Country: United States
- Colour: Chestnut
- Breeder: Mayland's Stud Company Ltd
- Owner: Paul de Moussac; Gary Tanaka
- Trainer: André Fabre; Ben Cecil
- Record: 30: 8-5-4
- Earnings: $1,152,425

Major wins
- Prix Guillaume d'Ornano (1993); La Coupe de Maisons-Laffitte (1993); Champion Stakes (1994); Del Mar Handicap (1996); Carleton F. Burke Handicap (1996)

Dernier Empereur (5 February 1990 – ca. 2004) was an American-bred Thoroughbred racehorse and sire. He was originally sent to race in France where he had considerable success, winning the Prix Guillaume d'Ornano and La Coupe de Maisons-Laffitte as well as finishing second in the Prix du Jockey Club as a three-year-old in 1993. In the following year he recorded his biggest success when he won the Champion Stakes in England. As a six-year-old he was transferred to the United States where he won the Del Mar Handicap and the Carleton F. Burke Handicap before his racing career was ended by injury. He made very little impact as a breeding stallion.

== Background ==
Dernier Empereur was a chestnut horse with a white blaze and four white socks bred in Kentucky by the Mayland's Stud Company Ltd. He was sired by Trempolino who won the Prix de l'Arc de Triomphe and finished second in the Breeders' Cup Turf as a three-year-old in 1987. As a breeding stallion, his other offspring included Valixir (Prix d'Ispahan, Queen Anne Stakes), Arkadian Hero (Mill Reef Stakes) and Germany (Grosser Preis von Baden). Dernier Empereur's dam, Dear Colleen, who won nine minor races in a racing career which lasted from 1976 till 1979, was a granddaughter of the Irish Oaks winner Uvira, whose other descendants have included Summer Squall, A.P. Indy, Duke of Marmalade and Lemon Drop Kid.

The colt entered the ownership of Paul de Moussac and was sent to race in Europe where he was trained in France by André Fabre.

== Racing career ==
=== 1992: two-year-old season ===
On his racecourse debut Dernier Empereur, ridden by Thierry Jarnet, won a minor race over 1500 metres at Saint-Cloud Racecourse on 12 October. In November he was moved up in class and distance for the Group Three Prix des Chênes over 1600 metres at Évry. He started the 11/10 favourite, but despite finishing strongly he was beaten a length by Dancienne.

=== 1993: three-year-old season ===
Dernier Empereur began his three-year-old season by finishing fifth behind the François Boutin-trained Hernando in the Listed Prix de Suresnes over 2100 metres at Longchamp Racecourse on 2 May and then finished third behind the same colt, over the same course and distance in the Group One Prix Lupin two weeks later. On 6 June, Dernier Empereur started a 25/1 outsider for the 156th running of the Prix du Jockey Club over 2400 metres at Chantilly Racecourse. Ridden by Sylvain Guillot he finished second of the eleven runners, two and a half lengths behind the winner Hernando. Three weeks later he started 9/5 favourite for the Grand Prix de Paris at Longchamp but finished fourth, a length behind the winner Fort Wood. On 14 August, Dernier Empereur, ridden again by Guillot, contested the Group Two Prix Guillaume d'Ornano over 2000 metres at Deauville Racecourse. He recorded his first major win, taking the lead 300 metres from the finish and winning by two and a half lengths from Fastness, a colt who went on to win two editions of the Eddie Read Handicap. In September, Dernier Empereur met Hernando for the fourth time in the Prix Niel and finished second to the Boutin-trained colt, beaten one and a half lengths. A month later, the colt was sent to England for the Champion Stakes at Newmarket Racecourse. After being restrained by Jarnet in the early stages, he stayed on strongly in last quarter mile to finish third of the twelve runners behind Hatoof and Ezzoud. On his final appearance of the year, the colt was sent to race in California where he started an 89/1 outsider for the Breeders' Cup Turf at Santa Anita Park and finished unplaced behind Kotashaan.

=== 1994: four-year-old season ===
On his four-year-old debut Dernier Empereur was brought back in distance and finished fifth when favourite for the Prix du Muguet and then finished fifth of seven behind Bigstone in the Prix d'Ispahan at Longchamp on 29 May. After a break of almost three months, the colt returned at Deauville in August and finished third in the Prix de Hastings, beaten a short neck and a nose by Red Bishop and Djanord. In September, Dernier Empereur met Red Bishop again in La Coupe de Maisons-Laffitte over 2000 metres on heavy ground. The other contenders included the British-trained favourite Pollen Count (Prix Eugène Adam, Hungerford Stakes, Prix Quincey) and the Prix La Force winner Sin Kiang. Starting at odds of 5.2/1 he was restrained by Jarnet in the early stages before taking the lead 200 metres from the finish and winning by one and a half lengths from Red Bishop. After the race, the colt was bought by the American businessman Gary A. Tanaka who said "I prefer to buy proven horses; it eliminates so many risks".

For the second year, Dernier Empereur was sent to England in October for the Champion Stakes in which he was ridden by Guillot. On a dull, foggy day, he started the 8/1 fifth choice in the betting behind Hatoof, Grand Lodge, La Confederation (Sun Chariot Stakes) and Muhtarram. The other three runners were Mehthaaf (Irish 1,000 Guineas), Environment Friend and Sacrament (Great Voltigeur Stakes). Hatoof took an early lead and set a slow pace before being overtaken by Grand Lodge at half way. Environment Friend and La Confederation were close behind whilst Guillot settled Dernier Empereur towards the rear of the field. A furlong out, Grand Lodge had opened up a clear advantage from Mehthaaf, Muhtarram and Hatoof, but the leader was beginning to tire and Guillot was making rapid progress. In a five-way blanket finish, Dernier Empereur produced a decisive late run to take the lead in the final strides and won by a short-head, a neck, a head and a neck from Grand Lodge, Muhtarram, Mehthaaf and Hatoof. Guillot later described the win as the best moment of his riding career. On his final start of the year he was tried on dirt in the Breeders' Cup Classic at Churchill Downs in November but finished unplaced behind Concern.

=== 1995: five-year-old season ===
As in the previous year, Dernier Empereur began his 1995 campaign with unsuccessful runs in the Prix du Muguet and the Prix d'Ispahan, finishing seventh in both races behind the four-year-old Green Tune. After winning a minor race at Vichy in August he attempted to repeat his previous success in La Coupe de Maisons-Laffitte but was beaten three lengths by Gunboat Diplomacy. In autumn he ran twice on dirt in the United States, finishing fourth behind Cigar in the Jockey Club Gold Cup and seventh behind Silver Fox in the Stuyvesant Handicap.

=== 1996: six-year-old season ===
In 1996 Dernier Empereur was transferred permanently to the United States where he was trained by Ben Cecil and campaigned on turf. In his first four starts he finished fourth in the Inglewood Handicap, eighth in the Manhattan Handicap, third in the Bel Air Handicap and second in an allowance race at Del Mar. On 9 August at Del Mar, the horse won his first race in North America when Pat Valenzuela rode him to victory in the Escondido Handicap over eleven furlongs. Three weeks later Dernieur Empereur contested the Grade II Del Mar Invitational Handicap over the same course and distance and started at odds of 6.5/1. Valenzuela produced him with a strong late run on the outside to win by half a length from Talloires. In September he contested the Grade I Canadian International Stakes at Woodbine Racecourse in Toronto but endured a "rough trip" and finished fifth of the seven runners behind Singspiel. Dernier Empereur' last race was the Grade II Carleton F. Burke Handicap over one and a half miles at Santa Anita Park on 4 November. Ridden by Chris McCarron, he took the lead in the straight and won by three lengths from Bon Point.

Dernier Empereur was being prepared for a run in the Japan Cup when he fractured his left front cannon bone in a training gallop at Hollywood Park.

== Stud career ==
Dernier Empereur was retired from racing and began his breeding career in France and was also shuttled to stand as a breeding stallion in New Zealand. He later stood at the Ballykisteen Stud in Ireland. He was not a success at stud, siring few winners of any consequence. The most successful of his offspring was probably Archduke Ferdinand, a stayer who won the Northumberland Plate in 2001. His last reported foal was born in 2004.

== Pedigree ==
Pedigree of Dernier Empereur (USA), chestnut stallion, 1990
Sire Trempolino (GB) 1984	Sharpen Up (GB); 1969	Atan	Native Dancer
Sire Trempolino (GB) 1984	Sharpen Up (GB); 1969	Atan	Mixed Marriage
Sire Trempolino (GB) 1984	Sharpen Up (GB); 1969	Rocchetta	Rockefella
Sire Trempolino (GB) 1984	Sharpen Up (GB); 1969	Rocchetta	Chambiges
Sire Trempolino (GB) 1984	Trephine (FR); 1977	Viceregal	Northern Dancer
Sire Trempolino (GB) 1984	Trephine (FR); 1977	Viceregal	Victoria Regina
Sire Trempolino (GB) 1984	Trephine (FR); 1977	Quiriquina	Molvedo
Sire Trempolino (GB) 1984	Trephine (FR); 1977	Quiriquina	La Chaussee
Dam Dear Colleen (USA) 1974	In Reality (USA); 1964	Intentionally	Intent
Dam Dear Colleen (USA) 1974	In Reality (USA); 1964	Intentionally	My Recipe
Dam Dear Colleen (USA) 1974	In Reality (USA); 1964	My Dear Girl	Rough'n Tumble
Dam Dear Colleen (USA) 1974	In Reality (USA); 1964	My Dear Girl	Iltis
Dam Dear Colleen (USA) 1974	Blarney Bess (USA); 1959	Tulyar	Tehran
Dam Dear Colleen (USA) 1974	Blarney Bess (USA); 1959	Tulyar	Neocracy
Dam Dear Colleen (USA) 1974	Blarney Bess (USA); 1959	Uvira	Umidwar
Dam Dear Colleen (USA) 1974	Blarney Bess (USA); 1959	Uvira	Lady Lawless (Family: 3-l)
