= Haras du Mezeray =

Haras du Mezeray is a French Thoroughbred horse breeding farm located at Ticheville, Orne, in the Lower Normandy region of France. This 500-acre (2.0 km^{2}) property was founded in 1962 by prominent horseman Paul de Moussac (1924–1995). The farm maintains one hundred horse stalls and a pre-training center suitable for all-weather galloping.

Now run by Charles-Henri de Moussac, Haras du Mezeray maintains up to seventy mares, and its current stallion roster includes Ballingarry, Muhtathir, and Trempolino.

Since its founding, Haras du Mezeray has produced notable horses such as Prix de l'Arc de Triomphe winners Trempolino (1987) and Subotica (1992), the 1988 Arlington Million winner Mill Native, and in Kentucky, Artie Schiller, the winner of the 2005 Breeders' Cup Mile.
