= Monade (horse) =

French-bred Thoroughbred racehorse

- Sire: Klairon
- Grandsire: Clarion
- Dam: Mormyre
- Damsire: Atys
- Sex: Mare
- Foaled: 1961
- Country: France
- Colour: Brown
- Breeder: Achille Fould
- Owner: George Goulandris
- Trainer: Joseph Lieux
- Record: 35: 9-x-x

Major wins
- Prix Imprudence (1962); Prix Penelope (1962); Epsom Oaks (1962); Prix Vermeille (1962); Prix de Pomone (1963); La Coupe de Maisons-Laffitte (1963)

Awards
- Timeform rating 129

Monade (1959 – after 1983) was a French Thoroughbred racehorse and broodmare. After showing great promise as a two-year-old in 1961 she reached her peak in the following year when she won the Prix Imprudence, Prix Penelope, Epsom Oaks and Prix Vermeille as well as finishing second in the Prix de l'Arc de Triomphe. She remained in training for two more seasons, winning the Prix de Pomone and the La Coupe de Maisons-Laffitte in 1963. After her retirement from racing she became a very successful broodmare.

== Background ==
Monade was a brown mare with no white markings bred in France by Achille Fould. As a yearling she was put up for auction at Deauville and was bought for £1,800 by the Greek shipping tycoon George Goulandris. During her racing career she was trained in France by Joseph Lieux.

Her sire Klairon was a top-class racehorse whose win included the Poule d'Essai des Poulains in 1955. His other offspring included Lorenzaccio, Shangamuzo and Luthier. Klairon was a representative of the Byerley Turk sire line, unlike more than 95% of modern thoroughbreds, who descend directly from the Darley Arabian. Monade's dam Mormyre, who won seven races in France, was descended from Mortagne, a broodmare bought by Fould for only £240.

== Racing career ==
=== 1961: two-year-old season ===
As a two-year-old in 1961 Monade finished second to Prudent in the Prix Yacowlef on her racecourse debut. She won two of her four subsequent races that year including the Prix des Foals at Deauville Racecourse.

=== 1962: three-year-old season ===
Monade began her second season by beating Santa Rosa into second place to take the Prix Imprudence over 1400 metres at Maisons-Laffitte Racecourse in April. She was then stepped up in distance for the 2100 metre Prix Penelope later that month at Saint-Cloud Racecourse and won from Gaspesie with Santa Rosa in third.

Monade was then sent to England and started at odds of 7/1 for the 184th running of the Oaks over one and a half miles at Epsom Downs Racecourse in which she was ridden by Yves Saint-Martin. The race produced an extremely close finish with Monade and the British-trained West Side Story racing side by side in the final furlong before crossing the line together. The racecourse judge was unable to determine the result from the original photo finish but after two additional prints were scrutinised the French filly was declared the winner by a short head.

On her return to France Monade recorded another major win in the Prix Vermeille over 2400 metres at Longchamp Racecourse in September, beating Prima Donna into second with Gaspesie in third place. In October, over the same course and distance, she was matched against male opposition for France's most prestigious race, the Prix de l'Arc de Triomphe and produced probably her best performance as she finished second of the 24 runners, a length behind the 40/1 outsider Soltikoff. She was then sent to the United States but ran poorly and finished unplaced behind Beau Purple in the Man o' War Stakes.

=== 1963 & 1965: later career ===
In 1963 Monade ran well in several major races. When returning to the scene of her Oaks triumph she was unplaced behind Exbury in the Coronation Cup but ran better later in June when she came home second to Manderley in the Prix d'Ispahan. She was on top form at Deauville in August where she won the Prix de Pomone and finished second to Hula Dancer in the Prix Jacques le Marois. In the following month she recorded her second important success of the season when she upset the Epsom Derby winner Relko to take La Coupe de Maisons-Laffitte.

As a five-year-old Monade did not add to her tally of significant victories but ran well in defeat when finishing second to Relko in the Prix Ganay in April and third to Cripton in the Prix Messidor in August.

== Assessment and honours ==
At the end of the 1962 season the independent Timeform organisation gave Monade a rating of 129. In their book, A Century of Champions, based on the Timeform rating system, John Randall and Tony Morris rated Monade a "superior" winner of the Oaks.

== Breeding record ==
After her retirement from racing career became a broodmare and was based in the United States for most of the rest of her lives. She produced at least eleven foals, all of whom won races, between 1966 and 1983:

- Koryo, a bay colt, foaled in 1966, sired by Ribot. Won 6 races.
- Que Mona, bay filly, 1969, by Ribot. Won one race. Dam of Prima Voce (Diomed Stakes).
- Remedia, bay filly, 1971, by Dr Fager. Won four races. Dam of Too Chic (Maskette Stakes).
- Miss Mazepah, bay filly, 1972, by Nijinsky. Won three races. Dam of Sadeem.
- Amen Wadeen, bay colt (later gelded), 1973, by Nijinsky. Won six races.
- Pressing Date, brown filly, 1974, by Never Bend. Won nine races.
- Aesculapian, brown filly, 1975, by Dr Fager. Won one race.
- My Maravilla, brown filly, 1979, by Blushing Groom. Won three races.
- Elect, bay filly, 1980, by Vaguely Noble. Won three races. Dam of Aquaba (Cotillion Handicap)
- Mariella, brown filly, 1982, by Roberto. Won three races in Europe.
- Mizima, bay filly, 1983, by Damascus. Won one race.

== Pedigree ==
Pedigree of Monade (FR), brown mare, 1959
Sire Klairon (FR) 1952	Clarion (FR); 1944	Djebel	Tourbillon
Sire Klairon (FR) 1952	Clarion (FR); 1944	Djebel	Loika
Sire Klairon (FR) 1952	Clarion (FR); 1944	Columba	Colorado
Sire Klairon (FR) 1952	Clarion (FR); 1944	Columba	Gay Bird
Sire Klairon (FR) 1952	Kalmia (FR); 1931	Kantar	Alcantara
Sire Klairon (FR) 1952	Kalmia (FR); 1931	Kantar	Karabe
Sire Klairon (FR) 1952	Kalmia (FR); 1931	Sweet Lavender	Swynford
Sire Klairon (FR) 1952	Kalmia (FR); 1931	Sweet Lavender	Marchetta
Dam Mormyre (FR) 1946	Atys (FR); 1934	Asterus	Teddy
Dam Mormyre (FR) 1946	Atys (FR); 1934	Asterus	Astrella
Dam Mormyre (FR) 1946	Atys (FR); 1934	Esclarmonde	Sunstar
Dam Mormyre (FR) 1946	Atys (FR); 1934	Esclarmonde	Desmond Lassie
Dam Mormyre (FR) 1946	Morkande (FR); 1934	Ksar	Bruleur
Dam Mormyre (FR) 1946	Morkande (FR); 1934	Ksar	Kizil Kourgan
Dam Mormyre (FR) 1946	Morkande (FR); 1934	Mortagne	Prince Eugene
Dam Mormyre (FR) 1946	Morkande (FR); 1934	Mortagne	Marmara (Family 13-d)
