= Waya Stakes =

- Class: Grade III
- Location: Belmont Park; Elmont, New York, United States
- Inaugurated: 1992 (at Saratoga Race Course)
- Race type: Thoroughbred – Flat racing
- Sponsor: Fasig-Tipton (since 2019)

Race information
- Distance: 1 3/8 miles
- Surface: Turf
- Track: Left-handed
- Qualification: Fillies and Mares, three years old and older
- Weight: Base weights with allowances: 4-year-olds and up: 126 lbs. 3-year-olds: 122 lbs.
- Purse: US$200,000 (since 2022)

The Waya Stakes is a Grade III American Thoroughbred horse race for fillies and mares, three years old and older run over a distance of 1 3/8 miles on the turf held annually in October at Belmont Park in Elmont, New York. The event offers a purse of $200,000.

== History ==
The race was inaugurated on 24 August 1992 and was run over the distance 1 3/8 miles on the Inner Turf track at Saratoga Race Course in Saratoga Springs, New York.

The event is named in honor of the French-bred multiple graded stakes-winning mare Waya who received the 1979 Eclipse Award as the American Champion Older Female Horse. Waya won the 1978 rendition of the Grade II Diana Handicap at Saratoga.

In 1996 and 1997 the event was moved to the main turf track and run at a longer distance of 1 5/8 miles.

The event was idle for 5 years from 1998 to 2002 and when it resumed in 2003 it had lost its Listed classification. The renewal was also taken off the Inner Turf track and run on the sloppy dirt track. The event was not held in 2008 and run on the dirt in 2004, 2007, and 2018.

In 2015 the event was upgraded to Grade III but since the event was taken off the turf in 2018 it only was a Listed type event.

In 2021 the event was moved to Belmont Park and the distance was shortened to 1 3/8 miles.

In 2022 the event was moved to Aqueduct Racetrack due to infield tunnel and redevelopment work at Belmont Park.

== Records ==
Speed record:

- 1 1/2 miles Inner Turf – 2:25.96 – Guapaza (CHI) (2016)
- 1 5/8 miles Main Turf – 2:40.19 – Ampulla (1996)
- 1 3/8 miles Inner Turf – 2:13.35 – Fairy Garden (1992)

Margins:

- 12 lengths – Born Twice (1997)

Most wins

- 2 – Saratoga Source (1993, 1994)
- 2 – My Sister Nat (FR) (2020, 2021)

Most wins by a jockey

- 3 – Javier Castellano (2016, 2017, 2019)

Most wins by a trainer

- 8 – Chad C. Brown (2015, 2016, 2019, 2020, 2021, 2022, 2023, 2025)

Most wins by an owner

- 5 – Augustin Stable (1993, 1994, 2004, 2005, 2011)

== Winners ==
Year	Winner	Age	Jockey	Trainer	Owner	Distance	Time	Purse	Grade	Ref
At Saratoga
2026	Evershed (IRE)	4	Flavien Prat	Arnaud Delacour	Mark B. Grier	1 3/8 miles	2:15.12	$225,000	III	
At Aqueduct
2025	Village Voice (GB)	5	Dylan Davis	Chad C. Brown	Resolute Racing	1 3/8 miles	2:15.71	$175,000	III	
2024	La Mehana (FR)	5	Kendrick Carmouche	Christophe Clement	LSU Stables	1 3/8 miles	2:21.42	$200,000	III	
2023	McKulick (GB)	4	Irad Ortiz Jr.	Chad C. Brown	Klaravich Stables	1 3/8 miles	2:20.10	$186,000	III	
2022	Rocky Sky (IRE)	5	Manuel Franco	Chad C. Brown	Peter M. Brant	1 3/8 miles	2:21.42	$200,000	III	
At Belmont Park
2021	My Sister Nat (FR)	6	José L. Ortiz	Chad C. Brown	Peter M. Brant	1 3/8 miles	2:15.37	$300,000	III	
At Saratoga
2020	My Sister Nat (FR)	5	José L. Ortiz	Chad C. Brown	Peter M. Brant	1 1/2 miles	2:30.26	$150,000	III	
2019	Fools Gold	4	Javier Castellano	Chad C. Brown	Wise Racing	1 1/2 miles	2:27.21	$200,000	III	
2018	Tricky Escape	5	Christopher P. DeCarlo	Lynn A. Ashby	Jon A. Marshall	1 1/4 miles	2:04.08	$186,000	Listed	Off turf
2017	Estrechada (ARG)	6	Javier Castellano	Mike Puype	Slugo Racing	1 1/2 miles	2:27.49	$200,000	III	
2016	Guapaza (CHI)	5	Javier Castellano	Chad C. Brown	Don Alberto Stable	1 1/2 miles	2:25.96	$200,000	III	
2015	Goldy Espony (FR)	4	Kendrick Carmouche	Chad C. Brown	Swift Thoroughbreds & Bradley Thoroughbreds	1 1/2 miles	2:29.04	$200,000	III	
2014	Cat's Claw	4	Cornelio H. Velasquez	Jonathan E. Sheppard	Helen C. Alexander & Jon S. & Sarah Kelly	1 1/2 miles	2:27.08	$100,000	Listed	
2013	Qushchi (GB)	5	Edgar S. Prado	H. Graham Motion	Andrew Stone	1 1/2 miles	2:27.21	$100,000	Listed	
2012	Kissable (IRE)	4	John R. Velazquez	Roger L. Attfield	Three Chimneys Racing & Trevor Harris	1 1/2 miles	2:32.52	$100,000	Listed	
2011	Emerald Beech	5	Alex O. Solis	Jonathan E. Sheppard	Augustin Stable	1 1/2 miles	2:30.86	$79,000	Listed	
2010	Changing Skies (IRE)	5	Kent J. Desormeaux	William I. Mott	Swettenham Stud	1 1/2 miles	2:27.46	$70,000		
Signature Stallions Stakes
2009	Queen of Hearts	4	Jose L. Espinoza	James A. Jerkens	Susan Moore & M&M Thoroughbred Partners	1 1/2 miles	2:27.85	$73,500		
2008	Race not held									
Waya Stakes
2007	Nunnery	4	Shaun Bridgmohan	William I. Mott	Claiborne Farm	1 3/16 miles	1:59.89	$84,050		Off turf
2006	Shared Dreams (GB)	4	Edgar S. Prado	Christophe Clement	Sarah & Robin Leigh	1 1/2 miles	2:29.08	$74,450		
2005	Latice (IRE)	4	José A. Santos	Jonathan E. Sheppard	Augustin Stable	1 1/2 miles	2:28.70	$66,700		
2004	Bounding Charm	4	Jerry D. Bailey	William I. Mott	Augustin Stable	1 3/16 miles	1:58.51	$65,700		Off turf
2003	May Gator	4	Jerry D. Bailey	Steven B. Flint	Richard, Bertram & Elaine Klein	1 1/8 miles	1:51.34	$63,800		Off turf
1998–2002		Race not held								
1997	Born Twice	4	Jean-Luc Samyn	Philip Johnson	Sullimar Stable	1 5/8 miles	2:47.60	$59,950	Listed	
1996	Ampulla	5	Shane Sellers	Patrick Byrne	North Cliff Farms	1 5/8 miles	2:40.19	$83,900	Listed	
1995	La Turka	4	José A. Santos	Barclay Tagg	Luis de Hechavarria	1 3/8 miles	2:16.35	$55,250	Listed	
1994	Saratoga Source	5	Julie Krone	Jonathan E. Sheppard	Augustin Stable	1 3/8 miles	2:16.98	$55,200	Listed	
1993	Saratoga Source	4	Julie Krone	Jonathan E. Sheppard	Augustin Stable	1 3/8 miles	2:15.85	$54,000	Listed	
1992	Fairy Garden	4	Mike E. Smith	Roger L. Attfield	Barry R. Ostrage	1 3/8 miles	2:13.35	$55,400	Listed	

Legend:
Turf Dirt

== See also ==
List of American and Canadian Graded races
