= Prix Guillaume d'Ornano =

Flat horse race in France

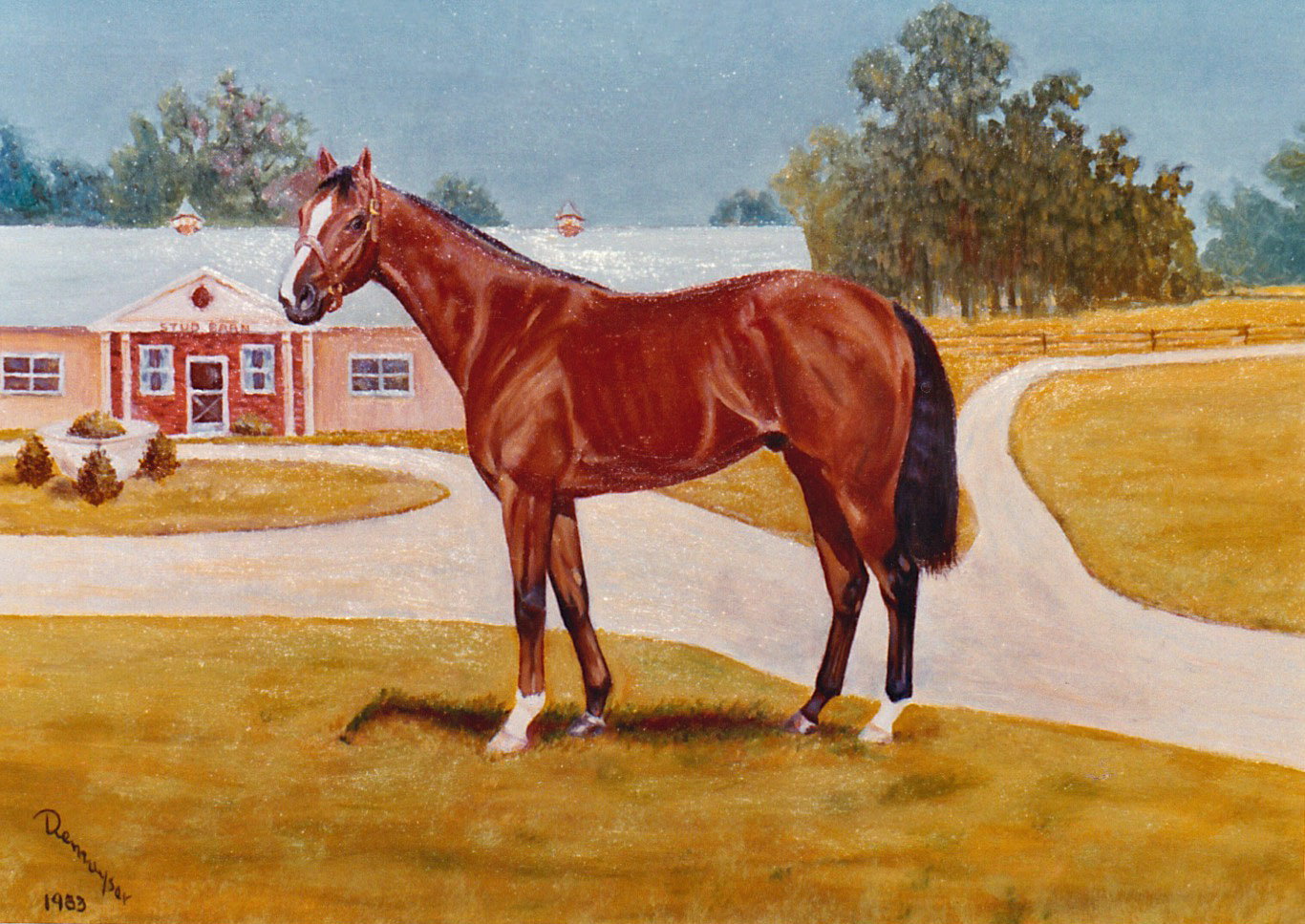
- Northern Baby, oil on canvas painted by Bob Demuyser (1920–2003)
- Class: Group 2
- Location: Deauville Racecourse; Deauville, France
- Inaugurated: 1952
- Race type: Flat / Thoroughbred
- Sponsor: Haras du Logis Saint-Germain
- Website: france-galop.com

Race information
- Distance: 2,000 metres (1¼ miles)
- Surface: Turf
- Track: Right-handed
- Qualification: Three-year-olds
- Weight: 58 kg Allowances; 1½ kg for fillies
- Purse: €400,000 (2022); 1st: €228,000

Prix Guillaume d'Ornano
2025
Alohi Alii	Rashabar	Cualificar

Previous years
2024
Economics	Jayarebe	Almaqam
2023
Ace Impact	Al Riffa	Birr Castle
2022
Al Hakeem	Junko	True Testament
2021
Dubai Honour	Pretty Tiger	Tasman Bay

2020–2011
2020
Mishriff	The Summit	Victor Ludorum
2019
Headman	Roman Candle	Flop Shot
2018
Knight To Behold	Patascoy	Study Of Man
2017
Eminent	Salouen	Avilius
2016
Almanzor	Zarak	Royal Artillery
2015
New Bay	Dariyan	Ampere
2014
Gailo Chop	Free Port Lux	Prince Gibraltar
2013
Vancouverite	Pilote	Zhiyi
2012
Saint Baudolino	Aesop's Fables	Ashkiyr
2011
Galikova	Slow Pace	Golden Lilac

2010–2001
2010
Scalo	Wealthy	Black Spirit
2009
Sri Putra	Three Bodies	Allybar
2008
Russian Cross	River Proud	City Leader
2007
Literato	Spirit One	Loup Breton
2006
Multidimensional	Boris De Deauville	Barastraight
2005
Pinson	Ruwi	Kendor Dine
2004
Mister Monet	Delfos	Islero Noir
2003
Kalabar	Saturn	Prince Kirk
2002
Highdown	Shaanmer	Burning Sun
2001
Masterful	Chancellor	Sagacity

2000–1990
2000
Best Of The Bests	Kutub	Hesiode
1999
Val Royal	Alrassaam	The Mask
1998
Kabool	Xaar	Sopraffino
1997
Rajpoute	Crystal Hearted	Handsome Ridge
1996
Sasuru	Android	Zero Problemo
1995
Montjoy	Warning Shadows	Silent Warrior
1994
Just Happy	Lassigny	Zindari
1993
Dernier Empereur	Fastness	Jeune Homme
1992
Great Palm	Sharpitor	Zaahi
1991
Glity	Arcangues	Kotashaan
1990
Antisaar	Agent Bleu	Eightsome

The Prix Guillaume d'Ornano is a Group 2 flat horse race in France open to three-year-old thoroughbreds. It is run at Deauville over a distance of 2,000 metres (about 1¼ miles), and it is scheduled to take place each year in August.

== History ==
The event was established in 1952, and it was originally called the Prix de la Côte Normande. The inaugural running was contested over 3,000 metres, and the race was shortened to 2,000 metres in its second year. It was extended to 2,400 metres in 1958, and restored to 2,000 metres in 1960.

The present system of race grading was introduced in 1971, and for a period the Prix de la Côte Normande was classed at Group 3 level. It was promoted to Group 2 status in 1983.

The race was renamed the Prix Guillaume d'Ornano in 1987. It was named in memory of Guillaume d'Ornano, a former owner of Haras de Manneville, a stud farm near Deauville.

== Records ==
Leading jockey (5 wins):

- Frankie Dettori – Kabool (1998), Best of the Bests (2000), Masterful (2001), Sri Putra (2009).Mishriff (2020)

Leading trainer (11 wins):

- André Fabre – Al Nasr (1981), Mourjane (1983), Creator (1989), Antisaar (1990), Dernier Empereur (1993), Lassigny (1994, dead-heat), Val Royal (1999), Russian Cross (2008), Saint Baudolino (2012), Vancouverite (2013), New Bay (2015)

Leading owner (6 wins):

- Guy de Rothschild – Marly Knowe (1953), Tropique (1955), Tang (1962), Chutney (1963), La Bamba (1964), Pinson (2005)

== Winners since 1979 ==
Year	Winner	Jockey	Trainer	Owner	Time
1979	Northern Baby	Philippe Paquet	François Boutin	Anne-Marie d'Estainville	2:02.0
1980	Glenorum	Alain Badel	David Smaga	Helen G. Stollery
1981	Al Nasr	Yves Saint-Martin	André Fabre	Moufid F. Dabaghi
1982	General Holme	Alain Lequeux	Olivier Douieb	Dan Lasater
1983	Mourjane	Alfred Gibert	André Fabre	Moufid F. Dabaghi	2:06.7
1984	Raft	Pat Eddery	Guy Harwood	Khalid Abdullah	2:04.5
1985	New Bruce	Philippe Bruneau	Gérard Collet	Ecurie du Ring	2:14.4
1986	Double Bed	Gérald Mossé	François Doumen	Ronald Reeves	2:08.7
1987	Broken Hearted	Richard Quinn	Paul Cole	Prince Fahd bin Salman	2:08.1
1988	Valanjou	Robert Laplanche	Louis Boulard	Jacques Bedel	2:06.1
1989	Creator	Cash Asmussen	André Fabre	Sheikh Mohammed	2:14.2
1990	Antisaar	Cash Asmussen	André Fabre	Sheikh Mohammed	2:13.6
1991	Glity	Éric Legrix	Jean-Marie Béguigné	Xavier Beau	2:06.9
1992	Great Palm	Alan Munro	Paul Cole	Prince Fahd bin Salman	2:12.7
1993	Dernier Empereur	Sylvain Guillot	André Fabre	Paul de Moussac	2:07.0
1994 (dh)	Just Happy; Lassigny	Walter Swinburn; Thierry Jarnet	Michael Stoute; André Fabre	Maktoum Al Maktoum; Sultan Al Kabeer	2:09.2
1995	Montjoy	Richard Quinn	Paul Cole	Sir George Meyrick	2:11.1
1996	Sasuru	Michael Hills	Geoff Wragg	Lady Oppenheimer	2:16.1
1997	Rajpoute	Gérald Mossé	François Doumen	John D. Martin	2:05.5
1998	Kabool	Frankie Dettori	Nicolas Clément	Maktoum Al Maktoum	2:07.0
1999	Val Royal	Olivier Peslier	André Fabre	Jean-Luc Lagardère	2:12.7
2000	Best of the Bests	Frankie Dettori	Saeed bin Suroor	Godolphin	2:06.7
2001	Masterful	Frankie Dettori	John Gosden	Sheikh Mohammed	2:07.9
2002	Highdown	Martin Dwyer	Marcus Tregoning	Mrs W. W. Fleming	2:10.4
2003	Kalabar	Thierry Thulliez	Pascal Bary	Khalid Abdullah	2:10.8
2004	Mister Monet	Joe Fanning	Mark Johnston	Syndicate 2002	2:14.4
2005	Pinson	Stéphane Pasquier	Jean-Claude Rouget	Guy de Rothschild	2:10.5
2006	Multidimensional	Christophe Lemaire	Henry Cecil	Niarchos Family	2:14.3
2007	Literato	Christophe Lemaire	Jean-Claude Rouget	Hervé Morin	2:03.9
2008	Russian Cross	Johan Victoire	André Fabre	Edouard E. de Rothschild	2:08.5
2009	Sri Putra	Frankie Dettori	Michael Jarvis	Sultan Ahmad Shah	2:06.1
2010	Scalo	Maxime Guyon	Andreas Wöhler	Gestüt Ittlingen	2:13.0
2011	Galikova	Olivier Peslier	Freddy Head	Wertheimer et Frère	2:07.6
2012	Saint Baudolino	Maxime Guyon	André Fabre	Godolphin	2:07.7
2013	Vancouverite	Pierre-Charles Boudot	André Fabre	Godolphin	2:04.22
2014	Gailo Chop	Julien Augé	Antoine de Watrigant	Oti / Chopard	2:11.64
2015	New Bay	Vincent Cheminaud	André Fabre	Khalid Abdullah	2:08.34
2016	Almanzor	Jean-Beanard Eyquem	Jean-Claude Rouget	Caro / Augustin-Normand	2:09.63
2017	Eminent	Ryan Moore	Martyn Meade	Sir Peter Vela	2:02.26
2018	Knight To Behold	Oisin Murphy	Harry Dunlop	L. Neil Jones	2:06.10
2019	Headman	Jason Watson	Roger Charlton	Khalid Abdullah	2:13.10
2020	Mishriff	Frankie Dettori	John Gosden	Prince A. A. Faisal	2:16.32
2021	Dubai Honour	Maxime Guyon	William Haggas	Mohamed Obaida	2:04.83
2022	Al Hakeem	Cristian Demuro	Jean-Claude Rouget	Al Shaqab Racing	2:07.58
2023	Ace Impact	Cristian Demuro	Jean-Claude Rouget	Gousserie Racing & Ecuries Serge Stempniak	2:07.59
2024	Economics	Tom Marquand	William Haggas	Isa Salman Al Khalifa	2:04.30
2025	Alohi Alii	Christophe Lemaire	Hiroyasu Tanaka	Tsuyoshi Suzuki	2:08.61
2026	Baroud	Pierre-Charles Boudot	André & Lavinia Fabre	Imad Alsagar	2:06.73

== Earlier winners ==
- 1952:
- 1953: Marly Knowe
- 1954: Tribord
- 1955: Tropique
- 1956:
- 1957: Fil d'Argent
- 1958: Wallaby
- 1959: Fatralo
- 1960: Hautain
- 1961: Tiffauges
- 1962: Tang
- 1963: Chutney
- 1964: La Bamba
- 1965: Rayon Rose
- 1966: Top Dream
- 1967: Topyo
- 1968: Semillant
- 1969: Gag
- 1970: Gold Rod
- 1971: Galant Prince
- 1972: La Troublerie
- 1973:
- 1974: Twig
- 1975: Kasteel
- 1976: Iron Duke
- 1977: Gairloch
- 1978: Crimson Beau

== See also ==
- List of French flat horse races
- Recurring sporting events established in 1952 – this race is included under its original title, Prix de la Côte Normande.
