= Ticheville =

- Commune
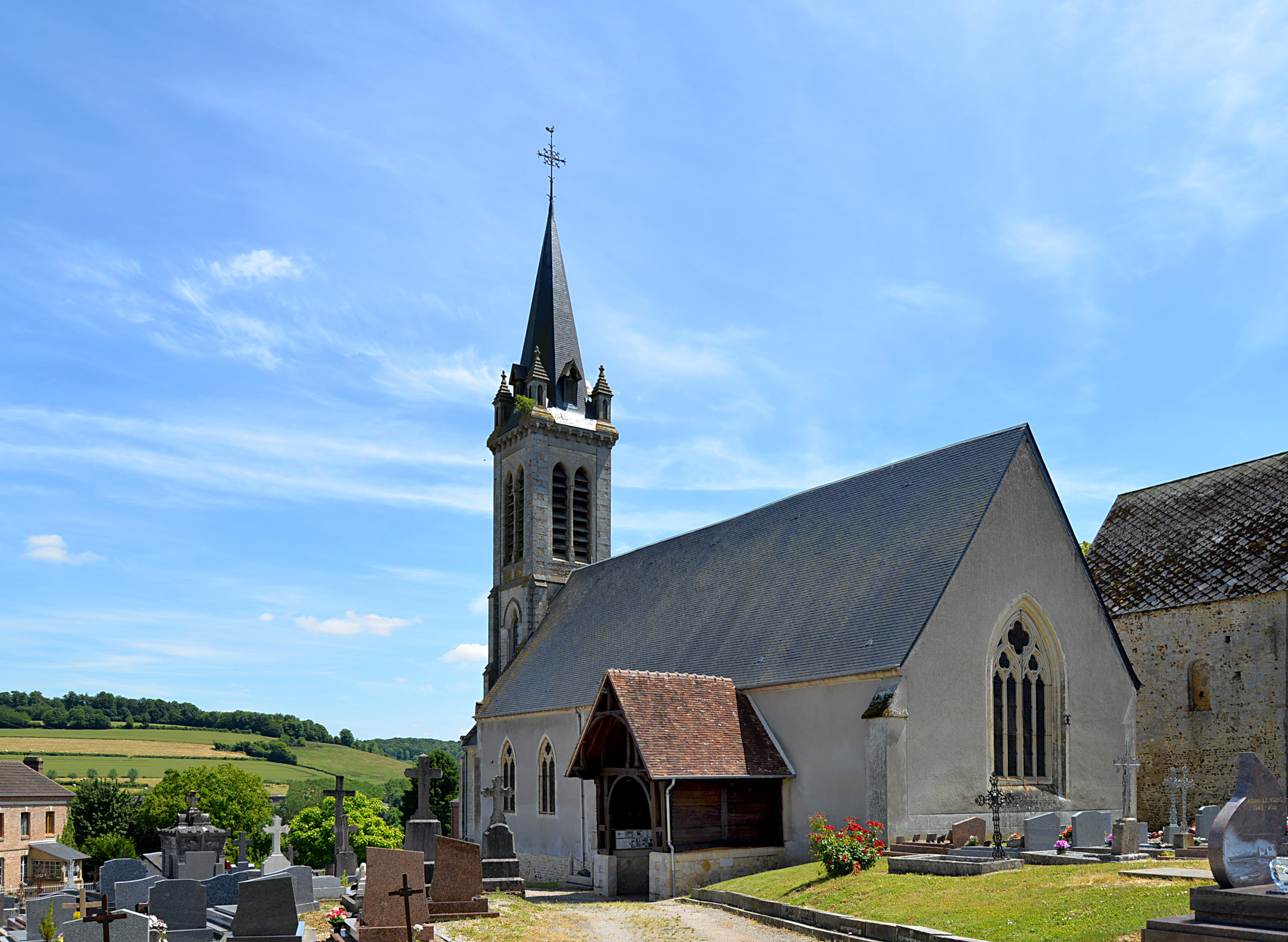
- The church in Ticheville
- Location of Ticheville
- Location within France Location within Normandy
- Coordinates: 48°54′33″N 0°15′55″E
- Country: France
- Region: Normandy
- Department: Orne
- Arrondissement: Mortagne-au-Perche
- Canton: Vimoutiers
- Intercommunality: Vallées d'Auge et du Merlerault

Government
  - Mayor (2020–2026): Maxwell Keller
- Area^{1}: 9.93 km^{2} (3.83 sq mi)
- Elevation: 154 m (505 ft)
- Highest elevation: 235 m (771 ft)
- Lowest elevation: 128 m (420 ft)
- Population (2023): 200
  - Density: 20/km^{2} (52/sq mi)
- Time zone: UTC+01:00 (CET)
  - Summer (DST): UTC+02:00 (CEST)
- INSEE/Postal code: 61485 /61120
- ^{1} French Land Register data, which excludes lakes, ponds, glaciers > 1 km^{2} (0.386 sq mi or 247 acres) and river estuaries.

Ticheville (French pronunciation: [tiʃvil]) is a commune in the Orne department in north-western France.

== Geography ==
The commune is made up of the following collection of villages and hamlets, Le Bocage and Ticheville.

The commune along with another 11 communes shares part of a 1,400 hectare, Natura 2000 conservation area, called the Haute Vallée de la Touques et affluents.

The commune has the Touques flowing through its borders, plus four other streams, La Roulandiere, The Pres Garreaux, The Tanneries and The Valame.

=== Climate ===
Ticheville benefits from an oceanic climate with mild winters and temperate summers.

Climate data for Ticheville (1997–2020 normals, extremes 1997–2024)
Month	Jan	Feb	Mar	Apr	May	Jun	Jul	Aug	Sep	Oct	Nov	Dec	Year
Record high °C (°F)	15.9 (60.6)	20.9 (69.6)	23.8 (74.8)	27.2 (81.0)	28.4 (83.1)	34.9 (94.8)	39.1 (102.4)	37.5 (99.5)	32.3 (90.1)	27.8 (82.0)	23.2 (73.8)	15.7 (60.3)	39.1 (102.4)
Mean daily maximum °C (°F)	6.7 (44.1)	7.7 (45.9)	10.8 (51.4)	14.4 (57.9)	17.7 (63.9)	20.9 (69.6)	22.9 (73.2)	22.9 (73.2)	20.1 (68.2)	15.3 (59.5)	10.5 (50.9)	7.6 (45.7)	14.8 (58.6)
Daily mean °C (°F)	4.3 (39.7)	4.7 (40.5)	7 (45)	9.8 (49.6)	13 (55)	16.1 (61.0)	17.8 (64.0)	17.9 (64.2)	15.4 (59.7)	11.9 (53.4)	7.7 (45.9)	5 (41)	10.9 (51.6)
Mean daily minimum °C (°F)	1.9 (35.4)	1.8 (35.2)	3.3 (37.9)	5.3 (41.5)	8.3 (46.9)	11.2 (52.2)	12.7 (54.9)	12.9 (55.2)	10.7 (51.3)	8.4 (47.1)	5 (41)	2.5 (36.5)	7 (45)
Record low °C (°F)	−12 (10)	−11.4 (11.5)	−9.3 (15.3)	−3.7 (25.3)	−0.8 (30.6)	3.3 (37.9)	5.8 (42.4)	5.5 (41.9)	1.9 (35.4)	−3.3 (26.1)	−7 (19)	−9.6 (14.7)	−12 (10)
Average precipitation mm (inches)	72.7 (2.86)	60.3 (2.37)	61.5 (2.42)	63.6 (2.50)	68.4 (2.69)	60 (2.4)	57 (2.2)	64.2 (2.53)	62.1 (2.44)	82.8 (3.26)	80.1 (3.15)	93.4 (3.68)	826.1 (32.52)
Average precipitation days (≥ 1.0 mm)	14.4	11.8	11.5	11	10.2	9.8	9.5	10.3	9.2	12.3	14.4	15.5	139.8
Source: Meteociel

== Places of interest ==
Ticheville is home to Haras du Mezeray, a Thoroughbred racehorse breeding farm founded by Paul de Moussac in 1962.

=== National heritage sites ===
Priory of Ticheville is a former 14th centuayy priory that was listed as a Monument historique in 1994.

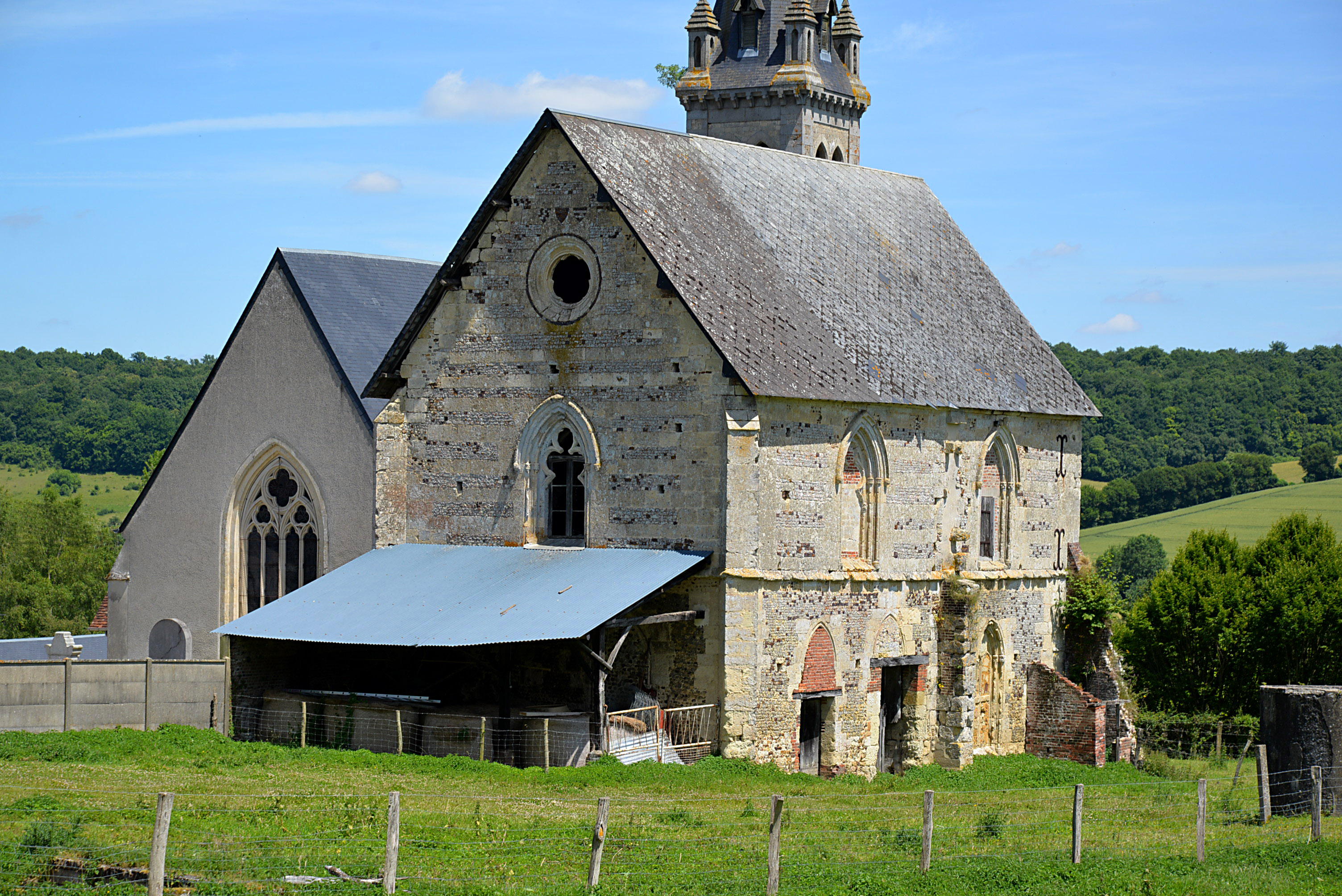
Priory Chapelle

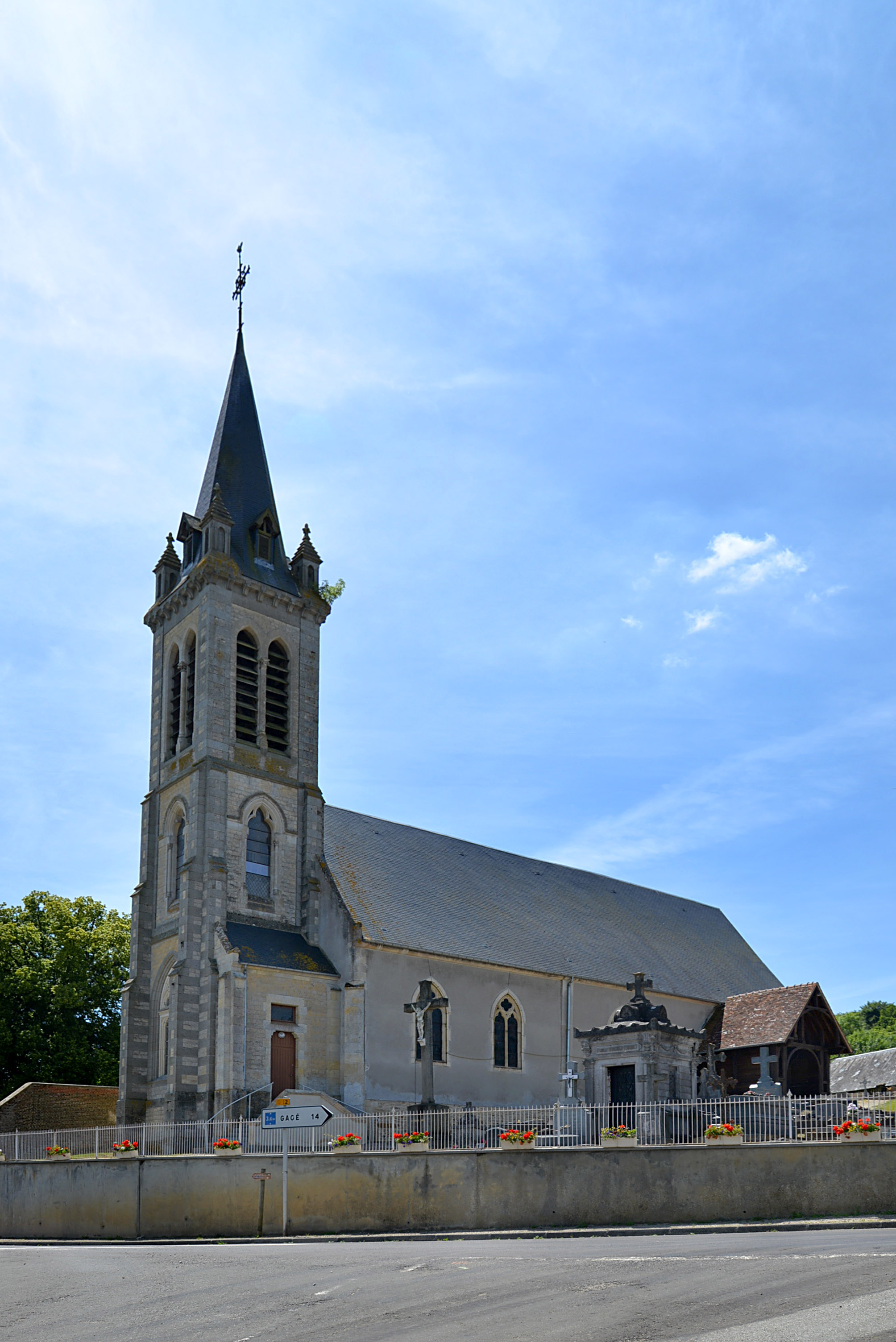
Saint-Pierre Church in Ticheville

== Notable people ==
- Jean Baptiste Boisduval (1799 – 1879), a French lepidopterist, botanist, and physician was born here.

== See also ==
- Communes of the Orne department
