= Prix Eugène Adam =

Prix Eugène Adam Grand Prix de Maisons-Laffitte
- Class: Group 2
- Location: Maisons-Laffitte; France
- Inaugurated: 1893
- Race type: Flat / Thoroughbred
- Website: france-galop.com

Race information
- Distance: 2,000 metres (1¼ miles)
- Surface: Turf
- Track: Straight
- Qualification: Three-year-olds
- Weight: 56 kg Allowances; 1 kg for fillies Penalties; 3 kg for Group 1 winners * 2 kg for Group 2 winners * 2 kg if two Group 3 wins * * since January 1
- Purse: €130,000 (2016); 1st: €74,100

Prix Eugène Adam
2025
Daryz	Bay City Roller	Sinileo

Previous years
2024
Bright Picture	Wootton Verni	Wahdan
2023
Horizon Dore	Maniatic	Bold Act
2022
My Prospero	Zagrey	Junko
2021
Pretty Tiger	Caprice Des Dieux	Adhamo

2020-2011
2019
Headman	Jalmoud	Flop Shot
2018
Gyllen	Crossed Baton	Louis D'Or
2017
Finche	Afandem	Avilius
2016
Heshem	Ultra	Spectroscope
2015
Dariyan	Green Dispatch	King Genki
2014
Western Hymn	Army Bulletin	Master Carpenter
2013
Triple Threat	Pilote	Dalwari
2012
Bayrir	Cogito	Fractional
2011
Pisco Sour	Glaswegian	Colombian

2010-2001
2010
Shimraan	Shamalgan	Hollywood Kiss
2009
Debussy	World Heritage	Prince Siegfried
2008
Twice Over	City Leader	Chinchon
2007
Harland	Regime	Russian Desert
2006
Flashing Numbers	Dragon Dancer	Linda's Lad
2005
Archange D'Or	Laverock	Kocab
2004
Valixir	Delfos	Hazyview
2003
Look Honey	Kalabar	Ridaar
2002
Burning Sun	Kaieteur	Louveteau
2001
King Of Tara	Stardan	Potemkin

2000-1990
2000
Sobieski	Premier Pas	Hesiode
1999
Dubai Millennium	State Shinto	Manndar
1998
Dr Fong	Aware	Quel Senor
1997
Kirkwall	Rajpoute	Romanov
1996
Radevore	Acharne	Oriental Express
1995
Royal Solo	Montjoy	Vaguely Gay
1994
Carnegie	Cafe Milano	Sand Reef
1993
Revelation	Talloires	Siam
1992
Pollen Count	Great Palm	Fast Cure
1991
Arcangues	Fortune's Wheel	Glity
1990
Dashing Blade	Verre Bleu	Hecquet

The Prix Eugène Adam is a Group 2 flat horse race in France open to three-year-old thoroughbreds. It is run at Maisons-Laffitte over a distance of 2,000 metres (about 1 1/4 miles), and it is scheduled to take place every July.

== History ==
The event was established in 1893 and was originally called the Prix Monarque. It was named after Monarque, the sire of Gladiateur.

The Prix Monarque was renamed the Prix du Président de la République in 1903. It reverted to its original name when a new Prix du Président de la République (the future Grand Prix de Saint-Cloud) was introduced in 1904.

The race was usually run on Maisons-Laffitte's straight track until 1910. For a period thereafter, it took place on the venue's right-handed course.

The event was renamed in memory of Eugène Adam (1840–1904), a former president of the Société Sportive d'Encouragement, in 1911. The title Prix Eugène Adam had been previously assigned to what later became the Prix Exbury.

The Prix Eugène Adam was abandoned throughout World War I, with no running from 1915 to 1918. It was cancelled once during World War II, in 1940. It was temporarily switched to Auteuil in 1944, and on this occasion it was contested over 2,100 metres. It was transferred to Saint-Cloud in 1946.

The event returned to Maisons-Laffitte in 1998, and it moved to Deauville in 2000. It began its current spell at Maisons-Laffitte in 2002. It is now subtitled the Grand Prix de Maisons-Laffitte.

Due to the 2019–20 coronavirus pandemic, the 2020 Prix Eugène Adam was not run.

== Records ==
Leading jockey (5 wins):

- Yves Saint-Martin – Jour et Nuit (1964), Silver Shark (1966), Quiludi (1971), Citheron (1972), Crow (1976)

Leading trainer (14 wins):

- André Fabre – Mourjane (1983), Cariellor (1984), Courtroom (1985), Un Desperado (1986), Sarhoob (1988), River Warden (1989), Arcangues (1991), Carnegie (1994), Radevore (1996), Kirkwall (1997), Sobieski (2000), Valixir (2004), Archange d'Or (2005), Triple Threat (2013)

Leading owner (7 wins):

- Marcel Boussac – Banstar (1926), Negundo (1933), Micipsa (1943), Goyama (1946), Sandjar (1947), Cordova (1954), Anaram (1960)

== Winners since 1980 ==
Year	Winner	Jockey	Trainer	Owner	Time
1980	Corvaro	Philippe Paquet	François Boutin	Gerry Oldham
1981	Bellman	Freddy Head	Criquette Head	Ecurie Åland
1982	What a Guest	Freddy Head	Robert Collet	Owen Helman
1983	Mourjane	Alain Lequeux	André Fabre	Moufid Dabaghi	2:07.00
1984	Cariellor	Alain Lequeux	André Fabre	Suzy Volterra	2:05.00
1985	Courtroom	Lester Piggott	André Fabre	Guy de Rothschild	2:09.90
1986	Un Desperado	Alfred Gibert	André Fabre	Moufid Dabaghi	2:04.20
1987	Motley	Cash Asmussen	Jonathan Pease	Nelson Bunker Hunt	2:06.00
1988	Sarhoob	Cash Asmussen	André Fabre	Sheikh Mohammed	2:07.10
1989	River Warden	Dominique Boeuf	André Fabre	Sheikh Mohammed	2:05.90
1990	Dashing Blade	John Matthias	Ian Balding	Jeff Smith	2:03.60
1991	Arcangues	Thierry Jarnet	André Fabre	Daniel Wildenstein	2:07.90
1992	Pollen Count	Steve Cauthen	John Gosden	Sheikh Mohammed	2:05.60
1993	Revelation	Tony Cruz	Richard Hannon Sr.	Cheveley Park Stud	2:07.60
1994	Carnegie	Thierry Jarnet	André Fabre	Sheikh Mohammed	2:07.60
1995	Royal Solo	Brent Thomson	Peter Chapple-Hyam	Robert Sangster	2:08.30
1996	Radevore ^{[a]}	Thierry Jarnet	André Fabre	Khalid Abdullah	2:05.30
1997	Kirkwall	Olivier Peslier	André Fabre	Khalid Abdullah	2:07.90
1998	Dr Fong	Kieren Fallon	Henry Cecil	The Thoroughbred Corp.	2:02.50
1999	Dubai Millennium	Frankie Dettori	Saeed bin Suroor	Godolphin	2:03.60
2000	Sobieski	Olivier Peslier	André Fabre	Sheikh Mohammed	2:10.20
2001	King of Tara	Thierry Thulliez	François Doumen	Robert Ng	2:04.50
2002	Burning Sun	Richard Quinn	Henry Cecil	Khalid Abdullah	2:03.60
2003	Look Honey	Yann Lerner	Carlos Lerner	Halil Aygun	2:02.40
2004	Valixir	Éric Legrix	André Fabre	Lagardère Family	2:07.90
2005	Archange d'Or	Christophe Soumillon	André Fabre	Edouard de Rothschild	2:01.30
2006	Flashing Numbers	Ioritz Mendizabal	Mario Hofer	Turf Syndikat 2006	2:00.80
2007	Harland	Philip Robinson	Michael Jarvis	Sheikh Mohammed	2:01.60
2008	Twice Over	Ted Durcan	Henry Cecil	Khalid Abdullah	2:07.80
2009	Debussy	Jimmy Fortune	John Gosden	Princess Haya of Jordan	2:02.80
2010	Shimraan	Gérald Mossé	Alain de Royer-Dupré	HH Aga Khan IV	2:06.20
2011	Pisco Sour	Jimmy Fortune	Hughie Morrison	Michael Kerr-Dineen	2:06.30
2012	Bayrir	Christophe Lemaire	Alain de Royer-Dupré	HH Aga Khan IV	2:02.40
2013	Triple Threat	Pierre-Charles Boudot	André Fabre	Team Valor	2:02.40
2014	Western Hymn	William Buick	John Gosden	RJH Geffen & Rachel Hood	2:07.90
2015	Dariyan	Christophe Soumillon	Alain de Royer-Dupré	HH Aga Khan IV	2:09.30
2016	Heshem	Gregory Benoist	Cristophe Ferland	Al Shaqab Racing	2:00.30
2017	Finche	Vincent Cheminaud	André Fabre	Khalid Abdullah	2:05.00
2018	Gyllen	Mickael Barzalona	André Fabre	Godolphin	2:09.74
2019	Headman	Jason Watson	Roger Charlton	Khalid Abdullah	2:02.66
2020	no race
2021	Pretty Tiger	Christophe Soumillon	Fabrice Vermeulen	Bernard Giraudon	2:10.83
2022	My Prospero	Tom Marquand	William Haggas	Sunderland Holding Inc	2:03.84
2023	Horizon Dore	Mickael Barzalona	Patrice Cottier	Gousserie Racing, Ecurie Du Sud Et Al	2:07.82
2024	Bright Picture	Maxime Guyon	André Fabre	Wertheimer et Frère	2:04.51
2025	Daryz	Mickael Barzalona	Francis-Henri Graffard	Aga Khan Studs	2:09.81
2026	Pearled Majesty	Christophe Soumillon	Mauricio Delcher Sanchez	Mme Christiane Head & M Delcher Sanchez	2:07:77

^{a} Desert Boy finished first in 1996, but he was relegated to third place following a stewards' inquiry.

== Earlier winners ==
- 1893: Saint Ferjeux
- 1894: Ravioli
- 1895: Merlin
- 1896: Sheridan
- 1897: Vidame
- 1898: Monfaucon
- 1899: Fourire
- 1900: Codoman
- 1901: Lady Killer
- 1902: Exema
- 1903: Alpha
- 1904: Gouvernant
- 1905: Val d'Or
- 1906: Maintenon
- 1907: Biniou
- 1908: Magellan
- 1909: Chulo
- 1910: Marsa
- 1911: Gavarni
- 1912: Amoureux
- 1913: Blarney
- 1914: Sardanapale
- 1915–18: no race
- 1919: Cesaire
- 1920: Petit Palais
- 1921: Guerriere
- 1922: Gaurisankar
- 1923: Checkmate
- 1924: Canape
- 1925: Ptolemy
- 1926: Banstar
- 1927: Queen Iseult
- 1928: Guy Fawkes
- 1929: Argonaute
- 1930: Potiphar
- 1931: Ilex
- 1932: Gris Perle
- 1933: Negundo
- 1934: Astronomer
- 1935: Vignes du Seigneur
- 1936: Don Milo
- 1937: Teleferique
- 1938: Patoche
- 1939: Ati
- 1940: no race
- 1941: Kourtchi
- 1942: Good Admiral
- 1943: Micipsa
- 1944: Coadjuteur
- 1945: Achille
- 1946: Goyama
- 1947: Sandjar
- 1948:
- 1949: Bahadur Fair
- 1950: Ksarinor
- 1951: Mat de Cocagne
- 1952: Fine Top
- 1953: Xacam
- 1954: Cordova
- 1955: Beau Prince
- 1956: Chateau Latour
- 1957: Balbo
- 1958: Speedway
- 1959: Memorandum
- 1960: Anaram
- 1961: Star
- 1962: Trac
- 1963: Corpora
- 1964: Jour et Nuit
- 1965: Trictrac
- 1966: Silver Shark
- 1967: Saint Leonard
- 1968: Timmy My Boy
- 1969: Hitchcock
- 1970: Highest Hopes
- 1971: Quiludi
- 1972: Citheron
- 1973: Rose Laurel
- 1974: Mannsfeld
- 1975: Free Round
- 1976: Crow
- 1977: Casaque
- 1978: Gay Mecene
- 1979: Planing

== See also ==
- List of French flat horse races
- Recurring sporting events established in 1893 – this race is included under its original title, Prix Monarque.
