= Thierry Gillet =

French jockey

Thierry Gillet (born 20 December 1969) is a top France jockey who won the 2004 Prix de l'Arc de Triomphe aboard Bago, a thoroughbred race horse he has ridden in 14 of his career starts. In April 2009, at age 39, Gillet announced his retirement from racing, citing recurring weight problems. He won 904 races in his career.

In 2007, he won the Critérium de Saint-Cloud riding the colt Full of Gold.

== Major wins ==
France

- Prix de l'Arc de Triomphe - (1) - Bago (2004)
- Critérium International - (2) - Act One (2001), Bago (2003)
- Prix Lupin - (1) - Act One (2002)
- Prix Ganay - (2) - Execute (2004), Bago (2005)
- Prix Jean Prat - (1) - Bago (2004)
- Grand Prix de Paris - (1) - Bago (2004)
- Prix Vermeille - (1) - Sweet Stream (2004)
- Critérium de Saint-Cloud - (1) - Full Of Gold (2007)
