= Bago (horse) =

French-bred Thoroughbred racehorse

- Racing silks of Niarchos family
- Sire: Nashwan
- Grandsire: Blushing Groom
- Dam: Moonlight's Box
- Damsire: Nureyev
- Sex: Stallion
- Foaled: February 3, 2001
- Country: France
- Colour: Dark Bay
- Breeder: Niarchos family
- Owner: Niarchos family
- Trainer: Jonathan Pease
- Record: 16: 8-1-5
- Earnings: $2,715,153

Major wins
- Prix des Chênes (2003); Critérium International (2003); Prix Jean Prat (2004); Grand Prix de Paris (2004); Prix de l'Arc de Triomphe (2004); Prix Ganay (2005)

Awards
- European Champion 3-Yr-Old Colt (2004)
- Last updated on June 22, 2007

Bago (born February 3, 2001, in France) was the European Three-Year-Old Champion Thoroughbred race horse in 2004. Bred by the Niarchos family, Bago is best known for winning the 2004 Prix de l'Arc de Triomphe amongst his five Group One successes.

== Background ==
Bago's dam Moonlight's Box, a daughter of the Champion Sire Nureyev, who also sired Miesque, the dual Breeders' Cup winner. She in turn is out of Group 1 winning Coup de Genie, a full sister to Machiavellian. In 1989, Bago's sire Nashwan won the 2,000 Guineas, The Derby, the Eclipse and the King George VI in one season, a feat no other horse has yet equalled.

He was trained by Chantilly-based Englishman Jonathan Pease, also renowned for being the mentor of many top-class horses including Tikkanen, Spinning World, Act One etc., Bago was ridden during his entire career by top French jockey Thierry Gillet.

== Racing career ==
Bago won all four starts as a two-year-old, including the Critérium International by six lengths.

In 2004, Bago was hit by a virus that kept him off the track all spring and took him out of contention for the spring classics. However, his return to Chantilly saw him win the Prix Jean Prat over nine furlongs. He then went to Longchamp for the Grand Prix de Paris. Following a third-place finish to another Niarchos family-bred Prix du Jockey Club winner Sulamani at York in the Juddmonte International, he ended his three-year-old career with a win in the Prix de l'Arc de Triomphe. In the race, Bago passed his rivals in the home straight and beat Cherry Mix on the finishing line.

In 2005, Bago won one of his seven starts. However, all his races were at the very highest level; they included racing in Ireland, Great Britain, the United States and Japan, as well as finishing 3rd in the Prix de l'Arc de Triomphe, 2nd in the Tattersalls Gold Cup at the Curragh, 3rd in the King George VI and Queen Elizabeth Stakes at Newbury, and 4th in the Breeders' Cup Turf at Belmont. In the Japan Cup, he received a severe cut and the right hind shoe was torn off during the race, which was the only time he ever finished out of the top four.

== Stud record ==
Bago was retired from racing and stood his first season at stud in Japan in 2006. He had immediate success, siring the Kikuka Sho winner Big Week in his first crop of foals but his later record was disappointing. It was only in 2019 that he sired his second Grade 1 winner when Chrono Genesis won the Shuka Sho. She would become by far his most successful progeny, earning 4 career G1 wins, and over ¥1.2 billion in winnings.

== Pedigree ==
Pedigree of Bago
Sire Nashwan	Blushing Groom	Red God	Nasrullah
Sire Nashwan	Blushing Groom	Red God	Spring Run
Sire Nashwan	Blushing Groom	Runaway Bride	Wild Risk
Sire Nashwan	Blushing Groom	Runaway Bride	Aimée
Sire Nashwan	Height of Fashion	Bustino	Busted
Sire Nashwan	Height of Fashion	Bustino	Ship Yard
Sire Nashwan	Height of Fashion	Highclere	Queen's Hussar
Sire Nashwan	Height of Fashion	Highclere	Highlight
Dam Moonlight's Box	Nureyev	Northern Dancer	Nearctic
Dam Moonlight's Box	Nureyev	Northern Dancer	Natalma
Dam Moonlight's Box	Nureyev	Special	Forli
Dam Moonlight's Box	Nureyev	Special	Thong
Dam Moonlight's Box	Coup de Genie	Mr. Prospector	Raise a Native
Dam Moonlight's Box	Coup de Genie	Mr. Prospector	Gold Digger
Dam Moonlight's Box	Coup de Genie	Coup de Folie	Halo
Dam Moonlight's Box	Coup de Genie	Coup de Folie	Raise the Standard
