= Proclamation (horse) =

Irish-bred Thoroughbred racehorse

- Sire: King's Best
- Grandsire: Kingmambo
- Dam: Shamarra
- Damsire: Zayyani
- Sex: Stallion
- Foaled: 1 May 2002
- Country: Ireland
- Colour: Grey
- Breeder: Cathal Ryan
- Owner: Abdullah Saeed Belhab; Princess Haya of Jordan; Godolphin
- Trainer: Jeremy Noseda; Saeed bin Suroor
- Record: 8: 4-0-1

Major wins
- Heron Stakes (2005); Jersey Stakes (2005); Sussex Stakes (2005)

Proclamation (foaled 1 May 2002) is an Irish-bred British-trained retired Thoroughbred racehorse and sire. After winning his only race as a juvenile in 2004 he emerged as a top-class miler in the following year, recording wins of progressively greater importance in the Heron Stakes, Jersey Stakes and Sussex Stakes. After being beaten in his three remaining races he was retired from racing at the end of 2006. He has had little success as a breeding stallion.

== Background ==
Proclamation is a grey horse, standing 16 hands high with a narrow white blaze bred in Ireland by Cathal Ryan, the son of Tony Ryan. He was from the first crop of foals sired by King's Best, the winner of the 2000 Guineas in 2000. King's Best's other progeny have included Workforce, Creachadoir (Lockinge Stakes), Eishin Flash (Tokyo Yushun, Tenno Sho), Sajjhaa (Dubai Duty Free) and King's Apostle (Prix Maurice de Gheest). Prclamation's dam Shamarra was an unraced mare bred by the Aga Khan and bought as a five-year-old for IR£55,000 by Cathal Ryan's Stacumny Stud. She was a granddaughter of the broodmare Shahana, whose other descendants have included Sendawar.

In October 2003, the yearling was consigned to the Tattersalls sale and was bought for 84,000 guineas by John Ferguson Bloodstock. The colt entered the ownership of Abdullah Saeed Belhab and was sent into training with Jeremy Noseda at Newmarket, Suffolk.

== Racing career ==
=== 2004: two-year-old season ===
On his racecourse debut, Proclamation contested a maiden race over the Rowley Mile at Newmarket Racecourse on 15 October and started at odds of 12/1 against twenty opponents. Ridden by Eddie Ahern, he took the lead two furlongs from the finish and won by three and a half lengths from Unfurled. The runner-up went on to win the Predominate Stakes, whilst other good winners to emerge from the race were Echo of Light (Prix Daniel Wildenstein) and Hard Top (Great Voltigeur Stakes).

=== 2005: three-year-old season ===
On his first appearance as a three-year-old, Proclamation contested the Group Two Dante Stakes (a major trial for The Derby) over ten and a half furlongs at York Racecourse in May when he was ridden for the first time by Frankie Dettori. He was made the 7/2 second favourite, but after pulling hard in the early stages he weakened badly in the last quarter mile and finished last of the six runners behind Motivator. Later that month the colt was dropped in class and distance for the Listed Heron Stakes over one mile at Goodwood Racecourse. He was restrained by Dettori in the early running before accelerating into the lead approaching the final furlong and drawing away to win "comfortbly" by three lengths from the David Elsworth-trained favourite Tucker.

Proclamation was then sent to Royal "Ascot" for the Group Three Jersey Stakes over seven furlongs. Because of redevelopments at Ascot Racecourse, all the course's fixtures were moved in 2005, with the Royal meeting taking place at York. Ridden by Johnny Murtagh, he started the 7/1 third favourite behind the Michael Stoute-trained Home Affairs and the Sandy Lane Stakes winner Camacho. He was towards the rear of the field in the early stages and was hampered on the turn into the straight. When Murtagh switched him to the outside he made rapid progress, took the lead a furlong out, and won by two and a half lengths from Camacho. Following his win at York, Procalmation was transferred to the ownership of Sheikh Mohammed's wife Princess Haya of Jordan.

On 27 July, Proclamation was matched against older horses for the first time in the Group One Sussex Stakes over one mile at Goodwood where he was ridden by Mick Kinane. He started 3/1 second favourite behind the mare Soviet Song, whilst the other runners were David Junior, Ad Valorem, Chic, Nayyir (Challenge Stakes, Diomed Stakes, Lennox Stakes), Sleeping Indian (John of Gaunt Stakes), Le Vie dei Colori (Premio Vittorio di Capua), Kandidate (third in the 2000 Guineas), Quito (Ayr Gold Cup), Mac Love (Supreme Stakes) and Tucker. He started slowly and was last of the twelve runners in the early stages but began to make progress when switched to the outside in the straight. He accelerated into the lead a furlong account and went clear of the field before holding off the late challenge of Soviet Song to win by half a length with a gap of two and a half lengths back to Ad Valorem in third. Commenting on the colt's performance, Kinane said "I went a bit sooner than anticipated because I was always going to be the last to play my cards. But the opportunity arose for me to make my move, fly down and get Johnny (Murtagh on Soviet Song) as he was moving through and hold him in a bit. I thought I'd make my move and if he can come and catch me, all well and good. He is a high-class colt" whilst Noseda described the winner as a colt with "a huge turn of foot and loads of talent". On the day after the race, Noseda reported that the horse had indicated his wellbeing by "screaming for his breakfast" that morning: he suggested the Queen Elizabeth II Stakes and the Breeders' Cup Mile as likely targets.

In September, Proclamation was dropped to six furlongs for the Group One William Hill Sprint Cup at Haydock Park and was made the 6/4 favourite against sixteen opponents. He was reported to be in "top form" before the race but never looked likely to win and finished eleventh behind Goodricke.

=== 2006: four-year-old season ===
For the 2006 season, Proclamation entered the ownership of Sheikh Mohammed's Godolphin organisation and was transferred to the stable of Saeed bin Suroor. On his first appearance for his new connections, Proclamation started the 2/1 second favourite for the Group One Queen Anne Stakes at Royal Ascot in June. Racing for the first time for more than nine months, he finished third of the seven runners, beaten one and a half lengths and a neck by Ad Valorem and Court Masterpiece. On his only other race of the season, Proclamation finished fifth behind George Washington in the Queen Elizabeth II Stakes at Ascot in September.

== Assessment ==
In the 2005 World Thoroughbred Racehorse Rankings Proclamation was given a rating of 122, making him the 20th best racehorse in the world, eight pounds below the top-rated Hurricane Run.

== Stud record ==
Proclamation was retired from racing to become a breeding stallion at the Overbury Stud in Gloucestershire. His early crops of foals made little impact. In 2015 he was standing at the Girsonfield Stud at Otterburn, Northumberland at a fee of £2,000.

== Pedigree ==
Pedigree of Proclamation (IRE), grey stallion, 2002
Sire King's Best (USA) 1997	Kingmambo (USA); 1990	Mr. Prospector	Raise a Native
Sire King's Best (USA) 1997	Kingmambo (USA); 1990	Mr. Prospector	Gold Digger
Sire King's Best (USA) 1997	Kingmambo (USA); 1990	Miesque	Nureyev
Sire King's Best (USA) 1997	Kingmambo (USA); 1990	Miesque	Pasadoble
Sire King's Best (USA) 1997	Allegretta (GB); 1978	Lombard	Agio
Sire King's Best (USA) 1997	Allegretta (GB); 1978	Lombard	Promised Lady
Sire King's Best (USA) 1997	Allegretta (GB); 1978	Anatevka	Espresso
Sire King's Best (USA) 1997	Allegretta (GB); 1978	Anatevka	Almyra
Dam Shamarra (FR) 1993	Zayyani (IRE); 1986	Darshaan	Shirley Heights
Dam Shamarra (FR) 1993	Zayyani (IRE); 1986	Darshaan	Delsy
Dam Shamarra (FR) 1993	Zayyani (IRE); 1986	Zariya	Blushing Groom
Dam Shamarra (FR) 1993	Zayyani (IRE); 1986	Zariya	Zahra
Dam Shamarra (FR) 1993	Shannfara (FR); 1977	Zeddaan	Grey Sovereign
Dam Shamarra (FR) 1993	Shannfara (FR); 1977	Zeddaan	Vareta
Dam Shamarra (FR) 1993	Shannfara (FR); 1977	Shahana	Wild Risk
Dam Shamarra (FR) 1993	Shannfara (FR); 1977	Shahana	Princess Yasmin (Family: 6-d)
