= 2000 Epsom Derby =

- Location: Epsom Downs Racecourse
- Date: 10 June 2000
- Winning horse: Sinndar
- Starting price: 7/1
- Jockey: Johnny Murtagh
- Trainer: John Oxx
- Owner: Aga Khan IV

Epsom Derby 2000
1-2-3
| Sinndar | Sakhee | Beat Hollow |

Also Ran
4-5-6
Best Of The Bests | Wellbeing | Hatha Anna
7-8-9
St Expedit | Barathea Guest | Zyz
10-11-12
Aristotle | Inchlonaig | Broche
13-14-15
Going Global | Cracow | Kingsclere

|} The 2000 Epsom Derby was a horse race which took place at Epsom Downs on Saturday 10 June 2000. It was the 221st running of the Derby, and it was won by Sinndar. The winner was ridden by Johnny Murtagh and trained by John Oxx. The pre-race favourite Beat Hollow finished third.

== Race details ==
- Sponsor: Vodafone
- Winner's prize money: £609,000
- Going: Good
- Number of runners: 15
- Winner's time: 2m 36.75s

== Full result ==
| | * | Horse | Jockey | Trainer ^{†} | SP |
| 1 | | Sinndar | Johnny Murtagh | John Oxx (IRE) | 7/1 |
| 2 | 1 | Sakhee | Richard Hills | John Dunlop | 4/1 |
| 3 | 5 | Beat Hollow | Richard Quinn | Henry Cecil | 7/2 fav |
| 4 | 4 | Best of the Bests | Chris McCarron | Saeed bin Suroor | 12/1 |
| 5 | 3 | Wellbeing | Willie Ryan | Henry Cecil | 7/1 |
| 6 | ½ | Hatha Anna | Kevin Darley | Saeed bin Suroor | 66/1 |
| 7 | ½ | St Expedit | Richard Hughes | Geoff Wragg | 28/1 |
| 8 | 1¼ | Barathea Guest | Philip Robinson | George Margarson | 12/1 |
| 9 | 2½ | Zyz | Jimmy Fortune | Barry Hills | 100/1 |
| 10 | nk | Aristotle | Michael Kinane | Aidan O'Brien (IRE) | 5/1 |
| 11 | 1¼ | Inchlonaig | Pat Eddery | Saeed bin Suroor | 16/1 |
| 12 | 7 | Broche | Christophe Soumillon | Saeed bin Suroor | 40/1 |
| 13 | ¾ | Going Global | John Reid | Sean Woods | 25/1 |
| 14 | hd | Cracow | Michael Hills | John Hills | 66/1 |
| 15 | dist | Kingsclere | Olivier Peslier | Ian Balding | 16/1 |

* The distances between the horses are shown in lengths or shorter. hd = head; nk = neck.
† Trainers are based in Great Britain unless indicated.

== Winner's details ==
Further details of the winner, Sinndar:

- Foaled: 27 February 1997, in Ireland
- Sire: Grand Lodge; Dam: Sinntara (Lashkari)
- Owner: HH Aga Khan IV
- Breeder: HH Aga Khan IV
- Rating in 2000 International Classifications: 132

== Form analysis ==
=== Two-year-old races ===
Notable runs by the future Derby participants as two-year-olds in 1999.

- Sinndar – 1st National Stakes
- Best of the Bests – 1st Solario Stakes, 2nd Royal Lodge Stakes
- Barathea Guest – 9th Coventry Stakes, 2nd Grand Critérium
- Zyz – 3rd Horris Hill Stakes
- Aristotle – 1st Racing Post Trophy
- Kingsclere – 4th Vintage Stakes, 3rd Solario Stakes, 2nd Stardom Stakes, 3rd Royal Lodge Stakes

=== The road to Epsom ===
Early-season appearances in 2000 and trial races prior to running in the Derby.

- Sinndar – 2nd Ballysax Stakes, 1st Derrinstown Stud Derby Trial
- Sakhee – 1st Sandown Classic Trial, 1st Dante Stakes
- Beat Hollow – 1st Newmarket Stakes
- Best of the Bests – 3rd Dante Stakes
- Hatha Anna – 5th Glasgow Stakes
- St Expedit – 2nd Predominate Stakes
- Barathea Guest – 1st Greenham Stakes, 3rd 2,000 Guineas, 4th Irish 2,000 Guineas
- Zyz – 3rd Easter Stakes, 3rd Dee Stakes
- Aristotle – 3rd Prix Greffulhe
- Inchlonaig – 4th UAE Derby
- Broche – 7th UAE Derby, 20th 2,000 Guineas, 5th Prix du Jockey Club
- Going Global – 3rd Sandown Classic Trial, 2nd Lingfield Derby Trial
- Kingsclere – 1st Easter Stakes, 5th Chester Vase

=== Subsequent Group 1 wins ===
Group 1 / Grade I victories after running in the Derby.

- Sinndar – Irish Derby (2000), Prix de l'Arc de Triomphe (2000)
- Sakhee – International Stakes (2001), Prix de l'Arc de Triomphe (2001)
- Beat Hollow – Grand Prix de Paris (2000), Woodford Reserve Turf Classic (2002), Manhattan Handicap (2002), Arlington Million (2002)
- Best of the Bests – Prix d'Ispahan (2002)

== Subsequent breeding careers ==
Leading progeny of participants in the 2000 Epsom Derby.

=== Sires of Classic winners ===
Sinndar (1st)

- Shawanda - 1st Irish Oaks (2005) - Dam of Encke (1st St Leger Stakes 2012)
- Youmzain - 2nd Prix de l'Arc de Triomphe (2007, 2008, 2009)
- Rosanara - 1st Prix Marcel Boussac (2009)
- Diakali - 1st Champion Four Year Old Hurdle, 1st Prix Alain du Breil (2013)

Sakhee (2nd)

- Tin Horse - 1st Poule d'Essai des Poulains (2011)
- Sakhee's Secret - 1st July Cup (2007)
- Presvis - 1st Queen Elizabeth II Cup (2009)
- Grumeti - 1st Anniversary 4-Y-O Novices' Hurdle (2012), 1st Cesarewitch Handicap (2015)

=== Sires of Group/Grade One winners ===
Beat Hollow (3rd)

- Wicklow Brave - 1st Punchestown Champion Hurdle (2016), 1st Irish St. Leger (2016)
- Minella Indo - 1st Spa Novices' Hurdle (2019), 1st Cheltenham Gold Cup (2021)
- Cinders And Ashes - 1st Supreme Novices' Hurdle (2012)
- Sea Moon - 3rd St Leger Stakes (2011)

=== Other Stallions ===
Barathea Guest (8th) - Doubly Guest (3rd Warfield Mares' Hurdle 2009) - Exported to Italy
Best Of The Bests (4th) - Minor winners - Exported to Canada
Wellbeing (5th) - Sired minor jumps winner before being gelded and sent over hurdles himself
Aristotle (10th) - Exported to Australia before standing in Ireland where he sired a minor jumps winner
Hatha Anna (6th) - Exported to Russia
