= Shareta =

Irish-bred Thoroughbred racehorse

- Sire: Sinndar
- Grandsire: Grand Lodge
- Dam: Shawara
- Damsire: Barathea
- Sex: Mare
- Foaled: 8 May 2008
- Country: Ireland
- Colour: Bay
- Breeder: Aga Khan IV
- Owner: Aga Khan IV
- Trainer: Alain de Royer-Dupré
- Record: 17: 5-5-2
- Earnings: £1,477,624

Major wins
- Prix de Thiberville (2011); Prix Minerve (2011); Yorkshire Oaks (2012); Prix Vermeille (2012)

Shareta (foaled 8 May 2008) is an Irish-bred, French-trained Thoroughbred racehorse and broodmare. She was a top-class middle-distance runner who showed her best form on good or firm ground. After finishing second on her only start as a juvenile she won three races including the Prix de Thiberville and Prix Minerve in 2011 and came second in the Prix de l'Arc de Triomphe. She went on to greater success in 2012 when she recorded Group One victories in the Yorkshire Oaks and the Prix Vermeille. She was retired from racing after finishing unplaced on her only start in 2013.

== Background ==
Shareta is a dark bay or brown mare with a small white star bred in Ireland by her owner the Aga Khan. She was sired by Sinndar, who won The Derby, Irish Derby and Prix de l'Arc de Triomphe in 2000. The best of his other progeny were probably Youmzain and Shawanda (winner of the Irish Oaks and Prix Vermeille and the dam of Encke). Shareta's dam Shawara won the Listed Prix Lieurey in 2001 and was a daughter of Shamawna, making her a half-sister to Shawanda.

Shareta was sent into training with Alain de Royer-Dupré and was ridden in all but one of her races by Christophe Lemaire.

== Racing career ==
=== 2010: two-year-old season ===
Shareta made her only appearance as a two-year-old on 31 October 2010 in the Prix Ténébreuse for previously unraced fillies over 1600 metres at Saint-Cloud Racecourse. Racing on heavy ground she started at odds of 7/2 and finished second of the fourteen runners, four lengths behind the winner La Teranga.

=== 2011: three-year-old season ===
On her first appearance of 2011, Shareta finished second to the Freddy Head-trained Galikova in the Prix Astronomie over 2000 metres at Saint-Cloud on 8 April. A month later over the same distance at Chantilly Racecourse she recorded her first success when she won the Prix de la Chapelle en Serval, taking the lead 500 metres from the finish and beating the odds-on favourite Andromeda Galaxy by two lengths.

Shareta was then moved up sharply in class for the Group One Prix de Diane at Chantilly on 12 June. Starting the 9/1 third choice in the betting, she never looked likely to win and finished seventh behind Golden Lilac who won by a length from Galikova. The filly was then dropped in class and stepped up in distance for the Listed Prix de Thiberville over 2400 metres at Longchamp Racecourse on 14 July. Starting 9/5 favourite against seven opponents she led from the start and accelerated clear in the straight before winning by one and a half lengths from Mourasana. At Deauville Racecourse in August, Shareta started 6/4 favourite for the Group Three Prix Minerve over 2500 metres. Mourasana was again in opposition but her main rivals according to the betting appeared to be her undefeated stablemate Pacifique, the Prix de Malleret runner-up Campanillas and the André Fabre-trained La Pomme d'Amour. After recovering from a poor start she took the lead after 300 metres and was never headed, drawing away in the straight to win by three lengths from Pacifique. After the race Alain de Royer-Dupré said "It was important for Christophe to get a breather into her having decided to make the running. All being well, she'll head for the Prix Vermeille next".

In the Group One Prix Vermeille at Longchamp on 11 September, Shareta started 9/2 second favourite behind the odds-on Galikova. Lemaire sent her into the lead from the start and she maintained her advantage until the last 100 metres when she was overtaken and beaten two and a half lengths and a neck by Galikova and Testosterone. On her next appearance Shareta returned to Longchamp for France's most valuable and prestigious race, the Prix de l'Arc de Triomphe on 2 October. With Lemaire opting to ride the favourite Sarafina she was ridden for the first and only time by Thierry Jarnet and started a 66/1 outsider in a sixteen-runner field. After racing among the leaders for most of the way she stayed on well in the straight and produced a career-best effort to take second place behind the German filly Danedream. The horses finishing behind Shareta included Snow Fairy, So You Think, St Nicholas Abbey, Galikova, Nakayama Festa, Workforce, Treasure Beach, Reliable Man and Masked Marvel. On her final appearance of the year, Shareta was reunited with Lemaire when she contested the Japan Cup at Tokyo Racecourse on 27 November. Starting at odds of 35/1 she finished seventh of the sixteen runners, four and three quarter lengths behind the winner Buena Vista.

=== 2012: four-year-old season ===
On her first appearance as a four-year-old started favourite for the Prix Allez France at Chantilly in April but after leading for most of the way she was overtaken 100 metres out and finished third behind Aquamarine and Haya Landa. In the Prix Corrida over 2100 metres at Saint-Cloud on 28 May, Lemaire adopted different tactics, settling the filly in fourth place before making a challenge in the straight. Shareta struggled to obtain a clear run before finishing strongly but failed by a nose to catch Solemia to whom she was conceding two pounds in weight. In the Grand Prix de Saint-Cloud on 24 June Shareta faced Danedream, Galikova and the 2011 Grand Prix de Paris winner Meandre in a four-runners field. She set the pace in the early stages and regained the lead after being headed by Danedream in the straight. She was then overtaken by Meandre 200 metres from the finish and was beaten one and a quarter lengths into second place.

Shareta was sent to England for the first and only time when she contested the Group One Yorkshire Oaks over twelve furlongs at York Racecourse on 23 August. She started the 2/1 second favourite behind The Fugue, a three-year-old who had won the Musidora Stakes and the Nassau Stakes. The other four runners were Was and Shirocco Star, first and second in The Oaks, Bible Belt (Dance Design Stakes) and Coquet (Height of Fashion Stakes). In a race run in what was described as a "torrential storm" of rain, Shareta tracked the leader Was before making a forward move in the last quarter mile. The Fugue took the lead a furlong out but Shareta stayed on strongly on the stands-side rail to overtake the British filly in the final strides and won by a neck. Alain de Royer-Dupré commented "I always thought she had the ability to be at the top with the fillies, we will have to see with the colts". He also explained that the long York straight had suited the filly saying "We came because the filly was in very good condition and because this is a marvelous track. I know she stays. Many times in France the straight is much too short and she doesn't have time to show what she can do".

On her return to France Shareta ran for the second time in the Prix Vermeille on 16 September and started the 7/2 favourite ahead of Galikova in a thirteen-runner field. The other runners included Princess Highway (Ribblesdale Stakes), Salomina (Preis der Diana), Romantica (Prix de la Nonette), La Pomme d'Amour (Prix de Pomone), Solemia, Sediciosa (Prix de Royaumont), Yellow And Green (Prix de Malleret) and Sarah Lynx (Canadian International Stakes). Shareta was amongst the leaders from the start as Galikova's pacemaker Sydarra made the running before moving into second place in the straight. She took the lead 400 metres from the finish, opened up a clear advantage over her rivals and won "comfortably" by two lengths from the 33/1 outsider with Solemia a head away in third. After the race, Royer-Dupre, who was winning the race for a record seventh time said "She loves the fast ground and she needs a good pace to show her true worth. She has the others in trouble some way out. For the Arc we'll have to follow what happens with the ground because if the track is heavy that changes everything". The Aga Khan said "I was very happy with that, she's a much more mature filly than she was last year. We always thought she was good but now she has learned to accelerate".

Shareta's second attempt to win the Prix de l'Arc de Triomphe took place on heavy ground at Longchamp on 7 October 2012. Starting at odds of 14/1 she was never able to reach the leaders and finished ninth of the eighteen runners behind Solemia. On her final appearance of the year Shareta was sent to the United States for the Breeders' Cup Turf at Santa Anita Park on 3 November. She started at odds of 4/1 and finished fifth of the twelve runners behind Little Mike.

=== 2013: five-year-old season ===
Shareta remained in training as a five-year-old but made only one appearance. She was sent to the United Arab Emirates to contest the Dubai Sheema Classic at Meydan Racecourse on 30 March. Starting the 6/1 third favourite she led the field into the straight before fading in the closing stages and finishing sixth behind St Nicholas Abbey.

== Assessment ==
In the 2011 World Thoroughbred Rankings, Shareta was given a rating of 120 making her the 59th best racehorse in the world of any age or sex and the fourth best three-year-old filly behind Danedream, Atlantic Jewel and Immortal Verse. In the 2012 World Thoroughbred Rankings, she was given a rating of 118 making her the 89th best racehorse in the world.

== Pedigree ==
Pedigree of Shareta (IRE), dark bay or brown mare, 2008
Sire Sinndar (IRE) 1997	Grand Lodge (USA); 1991	Chief's Crown	Danzig
Sire Sinndar (IRE) 1997	Grand Lodge (USA); 1991	Chief's Crown	Six Crowns
Sire Sinndar (IRE) 1997	Grand Lodge (USA); 1991	La Papagena	Habitat
Sire Sinndar (IRE) 1997	Grand Lodge (USA); 1991	La Papagena	Magic Flute
Sire Sinndar (IRE) 1997	Sinntara (IRE); 1989	Lashkari	Mill Reef
Sire Sinndar (IRE) 1997	Sinntara (IRE); 1989	Lashkari	Larannda
Sire Sinndar (IRE) 1997	Sinntara (IRE); 1989	Sidama	Top Ville
Sire Sinndar (IRE) 1997	Sinntara (IRE); 1989	Sidama	Stoyana
Dam Shawara (IRE) 1998	Barathea (IRE); 1990	Sadler's Wells	Northern Dancer
Dam Shawara (IRE) 1998	Barathea (IRE); 1990	Sadler's Wells	Fairy Bridge
Dam Shawara (IRE) 1998	Barathea (IRE); 1990	Brocade	Habitat
Dam Shawara (IRE) 1998	Barathea (IRE); 1990	Brocade	Canton Silk
Dam Shawara (IRE) 1998	Shamawna (IRE); 1989	Darshaan	Shirley Heights
Dam Shawara (IRE) 1998	Shamawna (IRE); 1989	Darshaan	Delsy
Dam Shawara (IRE) 1998	Shamawna (IRE); 1989	Shamsana	Nijinsky
Dam Shawara (IRE) 1998	Shamawna (IRE); 1989	Shamsana	Shanizadeh (Family: 22-d)

- Shareta is inbred 4 × 4 to Habitat, meaning that this stallion appears twice in the fourth generation of her pedigree.
