= Shawanda =

Irish-bred Thoroughbred racehorse

- Sire: Sinndar
- Grandsire: Grand Lodge
- Dam: Shamawna
- Damsire: Darshaan
- Sex: Mare
- Foaled: 3 March 2002
- Country: Ireland
- Colour: Bay
- Breeder: Aga Khan IV
- Owner: Aga Khan IV
- Trainer: Alain de Royer-Dupré
- Record: 7: 5-1-0
- Earnings: £153,466

Major wins
- Prix de la Seine (2005); Prix de Royaumont (2005); Irish Oaks (2005); Prix Vermeille (2005)

Shawanda (foaled 3 March 2002) is an Irish-bred, French-trained. Thoroughbred racehorse and broodmare. She was unraced as a two-year-old and finished second on her racecourse debut in April 2005. She then established herself as one of the best fillies of her generation in Europe with five consecutive win including the Prix de Royaumont, Irish Oaks and the Prix Vermeille. After finishing sixth in the Prix de l'Arc de Triomphe she was bought by Godolphin and retired from racing in 2006. She made an immediate impact as a broodmare, with her second foal being the St Leger winner Encke.

== Background ==
Shawanda is a bay mare with a narrow white blaze bred in Ireland by her owner the Aga Khan at his Gilltown Stud in County Kildare. The Aga Khan's racing manager remembered her as "a most attractive yearling and as much as we could tell about her as a young horse, she was very athletic". Shawanda was sent into training with Alain de Royer-Dupré in France and was ridden in all of her races by Christophe Soumillon.

She was sired by Sinndar, who won The Derby, Irish Derby and Prix de l'Arc de Triomphe in 2000. The best of his other progeny were probably Youmzain and Shareta. Her dam Shamawna won two minor races and finished third in the Group 3 Prix du Royaumont, and also produced Shareta's dam Shawara. She was descended from the British broodmare Aimee (foaled in 1957) whose other descendants have included Blushing Groom and King Kamehameha.

== Racing career ==
=== 2005: three-year-old season ===
Shawanda began her racing career in the Prix Dushka, for previously unraced three-year-old fillies over 2100 metres on heavy ground at Maisons-Laffitte Racecourse on 1 April and finished second of the fourteen runners, a length behind the winner L'Enjoleuse. Later that month she started the 1.7/1 favourite for a maiden race over 2000 metres at Chantilly Racecourse and recorded her first success, going clear of her rivals in the closing stages and winning by two and a half lengths. Shawanda was stepped up in class on 15 May when she contested the Listed Prix de la Seine over 2300 metres at Longchamp Racecourse and won again, taking the lead before half way and keeping on to win by one and a half lengths from Asi Siempre.

On 4 June Shawanda was moved up in class and distance for the Group 3 Prix de Royaumont over 2400 metres at Chantilly and started the 6/5 favourite against five opponents. Soumillon sent her to the front from the start and she broke away from her pursuers in the straight and won "easily" from Royal Highness by and two and a half lengths. The filly was then sent to Ireland for the Group 1 Irish Oaks over one and a half miles at the Curragh on 17 July and started the 9/2 second favourite behind the British-trained Dash to the Top. She had not been among the original entries for the race, meaning that the Aga Khan had to pay a supplementary fee of €40,000 to run her in the contest. The other eleven runners included Playful Act, Saoire, Pictavia (third in The Oaks), Mona Lisa (third in the Coronation Stakes), Hazariya (Athasi Stakes), Chelsea Rose (Moyglare Stud Stakes) and Thakafaat (Ribblesdale Stakes). Thakafaat set the pace with Shawanda settled behind the leaders and turning into the straight in fifth place before beginning to make steady progress. Shawanda overtook Thakafaat two furlongs out and accelerated away from the field to win in "impressive" style by five lengths from Playful Act. After the race Christophe Soumillon said "I have never won a Group One race so easily. To be honest, it could have been ten lengths and not five if I had really pushed her out. She was very impressive".

On 11 September Shawanda started the 4/9 favourite for the Group 1 Prix Vermeille over 2400 metres at Longchamp. Dash to the Top and Royal Highness were again in opposition, whilst the other three runners were Lune d'Or (Premio Lydia Tesio), Something Exciting (second in the Epsom Oaks) and Paita (third in the Prix de Diane). Shawanda took the lead after 600 metres and was never seriously challenged thereafter, accelerating clear in the straight and winning "comfortably" by three quarters of a length from Royal Highness. Soumillon described her victory as "just a piece of work". On her final racecourse appearance Shawanda was matched against male opposition in the 2005 Prix de l'Arc de Triomphe and started the 3/1 third favourite in a fifteen-runner field. After tracking the leader she took the lead in the straight but was outpaced in the closing stages and finished sixth behind Hurricane Run, Westerner, Bago, Shirocco and Motivator.

At the end of the year Shawanda was sold Sheikh Mohammeds Godolphin organisation and transferred to the stable of Saeed bin Suroor. She remained in training in 2006 but never ran again and was retired from racing at the end of 2006.

In the 2005 World Thoroughbred Racehorse Rankings Shawanda was rated the 30th best racehorse in the world and the second best three-year-old filly behind Divine Proportions.

== Breeding record ==
After her retirement from racing Shawanda became a broodmare for her owner's Darley Stud. She has produced at least four foals and two winners:

- Genius Beast, a bay colt, foaled in 2008, sired by Kingmambo. Won two races including the Sandown Classic Trial.
- Encke, bay colt, 2009, by Kingmambo. Won three races including St Leger Stakes.
- Country Music, bay filly, 2010, by Street Cry. Failed to win in five races.
- Metamorphic, bay colt, 2011, Monsun

== Pedigree ==
Pedigree of Shawanda (IRE), bay mare, 2002
Sire Sinndar (IRE) 1997	Grand Lodge (USA); 1991	Chief's Crown	Danzig
Sire Sinndar (IRE) 1997	Grand Lodge (USA); 1991	Chief's Crown	Six Crowns
Sire Sinndar (IRE) 1997	Grand Lodge (USA); 1991	La Papagena	Habitat
Sire Sinndar (IRE) 1997	Grand Lodge (USA); 1991	La Papagena	Magic Flute
Sire Sinndar (IRE) 1997	Sinntara (IRE); 1989	Lashkari	Mill Reef
Sire Sinndar (IRE) 1997	Sinntara (IRE); 1989	Lashkari	Larannda
Sire Sinndar (IRE) 1997	Sinntara (IRE); 1989	Sidama	Top Ville
Sire Sinndar (IRE) 1997	Sinntara (IRE); 1989	Sidama	Stoyana
Dam Shamawna (IRE) 1989	Darshaan (GB); 1981	Shirley Heights	Mill Reef
Dam Shamawna (IRE) 1989	Darshaan (GB); 1981	Shirley Heights	Hardiemma
Dam Shamawna (IRE) 1989	Darshaan (GB); 1981	Delsy	Abdos
Dam Shamawna (IRE) 1989	Darshaan (GB); 1981	Delsy	Kelty
Dam Shamawna (IRE) 1989	Shamsana (USA); 1984	Nijinsky	Northern Dancer
Dam Shamawna (IRE) 1989	Shamsana (USA); 1984	Nijinsky	Flaming Page
Dam Shamawna (IRE) 1989	Shamsana (USA); 1984	Shanizadeh	Baldric
Dam Shamawna (IRE) 1989	Shamsana (USA); 1984	Shanizadeh	Safiah (Family: 22-d)
