= 2005 World Thoroughbred Racehorse Rankings =

The 2005 World Thoroughbred Racehorse Rankings is the 2005 edition of the World Thoroughbred Racehorse Rankings. It is an assessment of racehorses which was issued by the International Federation of Horseracing Authorities (IFHA) in January 2006. It includes horses aged three or older which raced or were trained during 2005 in countries where the flat racing year runs from January 1 to December 31. These countries are generally in the Northern Hemisphere.

The ratings represent a weight value in pounds, with higher values given to horses which showed greater ability. It is judged that these weights would equalize the abilities of the horses if carried in a theoretical handicap race. The list includes all horses rated 115 or above, and it also shows the surface and the distances at which the rating was achieved.

The highest rating in the 2005 season was 130, which was given to the performance of Hurricane Run in the Prix de l'Arc de Triomphe. In total, 148 horses were included in the list, fourteen less than in the 2004 Rankings.

== Full rankings for 2005 ==
- Country foaled – Horse names are followed by a suffix indicating the country where foaled.
- Age – The ages shown for horses foaled in the Northern Hemisphere are as of their universal date of increase, January 1, 2005. The ages of horses born in the Southern Hemisphere are taken from their equivalent date, August 1, 2005.
- Sex – The following abbreviations are used:
  - C – Colt – Ungelded male horse up to four-years-old.
  - F – Filly – Female horse up to four-years-old.
  - H – Horse – Ungelded male horse over four-years-old.
  - M – Mare – Female horse over four-years-old.
  - G – Gelding – Gelded male horse of any age.

Rank	Rating	Horse	Age	Sex	Trained	Surface	Distance (m)
1	130	Hurricane Run (IRE)	3	C	France	Turf	2,400
2	128	Ghostzapper (USA)	5	H	United States	Dirt	1,600
3	126	Azamour (IRE)	4	C	Ireland	Turf	2,400
3	126	Westerner (GB)	6	H	France	Turf	2,400
5	125	Motivator (GB)	3	C	Great Britain	Turf	2,400
5	125	Saint Liam (USA)	5	H	United States	Dirt	1,800 / 2,000
5	125	Shamardal (USA)	3	C	UAE / GB	Turf	1,600
5	125	Shirocco (GER)	4	C	France	Turf	2,400
9	124	Afleet Alex (USA)	3	C	United States	Dirt	1,900 / 2,400
9	124	Bago (FR)	4	C	France	Turf	2,400
9	124	Deep Impact (JPN)	3	C	Japan	Turf	2,400
9	124	Leroidesanimaux (BRZ)	5	H	United States	Turf	1,600
9	124	Starcraft (NZ)	5	H	Great Britain	Turf	1,600
14	123	Alkaased (USA)	5	H	Great Britain	Turf	2,400
14	123	David Junior (USA)	3	C	Great Britain	Turf	2,000
14	123	Dubawi (IRE)	3	C	Great Britain	Turf	1,600
14	123	Oratorio (IRE)	3	C	Ireland	Turf	2,000
14	123	Roses in May (USA)	5	H	United States	Dirt	2,000
14	123	Silent Witness (AUS)	6	G	Hong Kong	Turf	1,200
20	122	Ace (IRE)	4	C	Ireland	Turf	2,400
20	122	Borrego (USA)	4	C	United States	Dirt	2,000
20	122	Divine Proportions (USA)	3	F	France	Turf	1,600
20	122	Flower Alley (USA)	3	C	United States	Dirt	2,000
20	122	Grey Swallow (IRE)	4	C	Ireland	Turf	2,100
20	122	Heart's Cry (JPN)	4	C	Japan	Turf	2,400 / 2,500
20	122	Norse Dancer (IRE)	5	H	Great Britain	Turf	2,400
20	122	Proclamation (IRE)	3	C	Great Britain	Turf	1,600
20	122	Relaxed Gesture (IRE)	4	C	United States	Turf	2,400
20	122	Rock Hard Ten (USA)	4	C	United States	Dirt	1,800 / 2,000
30	121	Artie Schiller (USA)	4	C	United States	Turf	1,600
30	121	Electrocutionist (USA)	4	C	Italy	Turf	2,080
30	121	Shawanda (IRE)	3	F	France	Turf	2,400
30	121	Valixir (IRE)	4	C	France	Turf	1,600
34	120	Bellamy Road (USA)	3	C	United States	Dirt	1,800
34	120	Cesario (JPN)	3	F	Japan	Turf	2,000
34	120	Giacomo (USA)	3	C	United States	Dirt	2,000
34	120	Imperial Stride (GB)	4	C	Great Britain	Turf	2,400
34	120	Lava Man (USA)	4	G	United States	Dirt	2,000
34	120	Maraahel (IRE)	4	C	Great Britain	Turf	2,080
34	120	Powerscourt (GB)	5	H	Ireland	Turf	2,000
34	120	Rakti (GB)	6	H	Great Britain	Turf	1,600
34	120	Scorpion (IRE)	3	C	Ireland	Turf	2,400
34	120	Whipper (USA)	4	C	France	Turf	1,600
34	120	Yeats (IRE)	4	C	Ireland	Turf	2,400
34	120	Zenno Rob Roy (JPN)	5	H	Japan	Turf	2,080 / 2,400
46	119	Alexander Goldrun (IRE)	4	F	Ireland	Turf	2,000
46	119	Closing Argument (USA)	3	C	United States	Dirt	2,000
46	119	Commentator (USA)	4	G	United States	Dirt	1,800
46	119	Lincoln (JPN)	5	H	Japan	Turf	2,400 / 2,500
46	119	Lost in the Fog (USA)	3	C	United States	Dirt	1,400
46	119	Perfect Drift (USA)	6	G	United States	Dirt	2,000
46	119	Pride (FR)	5	M	France	Turf	2,400
46	119	Silver Train (USA)	3	C	United States	Dirt	1,200
46	119	Soviet Song (IRE)	5	M	Great Britain	Turf	1,600
55	118	Asakusa Den'en (GB)	6	H	Japan	Turf	1,600
55	118	Bandari (IRE)	6	H	Great Britain	Turf	2,400
55	118	Better Talk Now (USA)	6	G	United States	Turf	2,200
55	118	Bullish Luck (USA)	6	G	Hong Kong	Turf	1,600
55	118	Durandal (JPN)	6	H	Japan	Turf	1,200
55	118	Elvstroem (AUS)	5	H	Australia	Turf	1,777
55	118	Gamut (IRE)	6	H	Great Britain	Turf	2,400
55	118	Hat Trick (JPN)	4	C	Japan	Turf	1,600
55	118	Intercontinental (GB)	5	M	United States	Turf	2,000
55	118	Kitten's Joy (USA)	4	C	United States	Turf	1,600
55	118	Mummify (AUS)	6	G	Australia	Turf	2,000
55	118	Pastoral Pursuits (GB)	4	C	Great Britain	Turf	1,200
55	118	Pinson (IRE)	3	C	France	Turf	2,000
55	118	Pleasant Home (USA)	4	F	United States	Dirt	1,800
55	118	Shakespeare (USA)	4	C	United States	Turf	2,400
55	118	Super Frolic (USA)	5	H	United States	Dirt	2,000
55	118	Taste of Paradise (USA)	6	H	United States	Dirt	1,200
55	118	Warrsan (IRE)	7	H	Great Britain	Turf	2,400
73	117	Ashado (USA)	4	F	United States	Dirt	1,800
73	117	Cosmo Bulk (JPN)	4	C	Japan	Turf	2,500
73	117	Daiwa Major (JPN)	4	C	Japan	Turf	1,600
73	117	Darsalam (IRE)	4	C	Czech Republic	Turf	2,400
73	117	Distinction (IRE)	6	G	Great Britain	Turf	4,000
73	117	English Channel (USA)	3	C	United States	Turf	2,400
73	117	Goodricke (GB)	3	C	Great Britain	Turf	1,200 / 1,300
73	117	King's Drama (IRE)	5	G	United States	Turf	2,200 / 2,400
73	117	Majors Cast (IRE)	4	C	Great Britain	Turf	1,600
73	117	Millenary (GB)	8	H	Great Britain	Turf	3,180 / 3,600
73	117	North Light (IRE)	4	C	Great Britain	Turf	2,006
73	117	Ouija Board (GB)	4	F	Great Britain	Turf	2,400
73	117	Ruwi (GB)	3	C	France	Turf	1,950
73	117	Suave (USA)	4	C	United States	Dirt	2,000
73	117	Sunrise Pegasus (JPN)	7	H	Japan	Turf	2,400
73	117	Sweep Tosho (JPN)	4	F	Japan	Turf	2,200
89	116	Ad Valorem (USA)	3	C	Ireland	Turf	1,600
89	116	Admire Max (JPN)	6	H	Japan	Turf	1,200
89	116	Altieri (GB)	7	H	Italy	Turf	2,000
89	116	Attraction (GB)	4	F	Great Britain	Turf	1,600
89	116	Cacique (IRE)	4	C	France	Turf	1,600
89	116	Choctaw Nation (USA)	5	G	United States	Dirt	2,000
89	116	Coin Toss (JPN)	7	H	Japan	Turf	2,500
89	116	Collier Hill (GB)	7	G	Great Britain	Turf	2,800
89	116	Footstepsinthesand (GB)	3	C	Ireland	Turf	1,600
89	116	Forest Danger (USA)	4	C	United States	Dirt	1,400
89	116	Gorella (FR)	3	F	France / USA	Turf	1,600
89	116	Heavenly Romance (JPN)	5	M	Japan	Turf	2,000
89	116	Indesatchel (IRE)	3	C	Ireland	Turf	1,600
89	116	Le Vie dei Colori (GB)	5	H	Great Britain	Turf	1,400
89	116	Limehouse (USA)	4	C	United States	Turf	1,600
89	116	Martillo (GER)	5	H	Germany	Turf	1,600
89	116	Phoenix Reach (IRE)	5	H	Great Britain	Turf	2,000 / 2,400
89	116	Policy Maker (IRE)	5	H	France	Turf	2,400
89	116	Roman Ruler (USA)	3	C	United States	Dirt	1,800
89	116	Singletary (USA)	5	H	United States	Turf	1,600
89	116	Soldier Hollow (GB)	5	H	Germany	Turf	2,000
89	116	Vadawina (IRE)	3	F	France	Turf	2,000
89	116	Vinnie Roe (IRE)	7	H	Ireland	Turf	3,200
89	116	Walk in the Park (IRE)	3	C	France	Turf	2,400
113	115	Alcazar (IRE)	10	G	Great Britain	Turf	3,100
113	115	Bandini (USA)	3	C	United States	Dirt	1,800
113	115	Blatant (GB)	6	G	Great Britain	Turf	1,600
113	115	Buzzards Bay (USA)	3	C	United States	Dirt	1,800
113	115	Cape of Good Hope (GB)	7	G	Hong Kong	Turf	1,200
113	115	Cherry Mix (FR)	4	C	UAE / GB	Turf	2,400
113	115	Chic (GB)	5	M	Great Britain	Turf	1,600
113	115	Chineur (FR)	4	C	France	Turf	1,000
113	115	Consolidator (USA)	3	C	United States	Dirt	1,700
113	115	Day Flight (GB)	4	C	Great Britain	Turf	2,405
113	115	Desideratum (GB)	3	C	France	Turf	2,400
113	115	Dynever (USA)	5	H	United States	Dirt	2,000
113	115	Eddington (USA)	4	C	United States	Dirt	1,900
113	115	Epalo (GER)	6	H	Germany	Turf	2,000
113	115	Eswarah (GB)	3	F	Great Britain	Turf	2,400
113	115	Film Maker (USA)	5	M	United States	Turf	2,000
113	115	Fourty Niners Son (USA)	4	C	United States	Turf	2,000
113	115	Gharir (IRE)	3	C	France	Turf	1,600
113	115	Gun Salute (USA)	3	C	United States	Turf	2,000
113	115	Hard Top (IRE)	3	C	Great Britain	Turf	2,400
113	115	Host (CHI)	5	H	United States	Turf	1,600
113	115	Kane Hekili (JPN)	3	C	Japan	Dirt	2,100
113	115	Lundy's Liability (BRZ)	5	H	United States	Dirt	1,800 / 2,000
113	115	Maruka Kiseki (JPN)	4	C	Japan	Turf	1,200
113	115	Megahertz (GB)	6	M	United States	Turf	1,800 / 2,000
113	115	Meteor Storm (GB)	6	H	United States	Turf	2,400
113	115	Mubtaker (USA)	8	H	Great Britain	Turf	2,655
113	115	Nayyir (GB)	7	G	Great Britain	Turf	1,600
113	115	Riskaverse (USA)	6	M	United States	Turf	2,000
113	115	Sweet Catomine (USA)	3	F	United States	Dirt	1,700
113	115	Sweet Return (GB)	5	H	United States	Turf	1,800
113	115	Tap Dance City (USA)	8	H	Japan	Turf	2,000
113	115	The Geezer (GB)	3	C	Great Britain	Turf	2,920
113	115	The Whistling Teal (GB)	9	G	Great Britain	Turf	2,800
113	115	Touch of Land (FR)	5	H	France	Turf	2,000
113	115	Turtle Bowl (IRE)	3	C	France	Turf	1,600

Certain horses may have also recorded a lesser rating over a distance different from that listed above. The IFHA publishes this information when the lower rating represents the overall top performance in a particular category. There were four such additional ratings for this season:

Rank	Rating	Horse	Age	Sex	Trained	Surface	Distance (m)
+	123	Azamour (IRE)	4	C	Ireland	Turf	2,000
+	118	Deep Impact (JPN)	3	C	Japan	Turf	3,000
+	118	Westerner (GB)	6	H	France	Turf	4,000
+	118	Whipper (USA)	4	C	France	Turf	1,300

== Top ranked horses ==
The tables below show the top ranked horses overall, the top fillies and mares, and the top three-year-olds in the 2005 Rankings. They also show the top performers in various subdivisions of each group, which are defined by the distances of races, and the surfaces on which they are run. The IFHA recognizes five distance categories — Sprint, Mile, Intermediate, Long and Extended — identified by the acronym "SMILE". These are framed as follows:

- Sprint: 1,000–1,300m (1,000–1,599m for races in Canada and the United States)
- Mile: 1,301–1,899m (1,600–1,899m for races in Canada and the United States)
- Intermediate: 1,900–2,100m
- Long: 2,101–2,700m
- Extended: 2,701m +

All Horses
	All Surfaces	Dirt	Turf
All Distances	130 – Hurricane Run	128 – Ghostzapper	130 – Hurricane Run
Sprint	123 – Silent Witness	119 – Lost in the Fog; 119 – Silver Train	123 – Silent Witness
Mile	128 – Ghostzapper	128 – Ghostzapper	125 – Shamardal
Intermediate	125 – Saint Liam	125 – Saint Liam	123 – Azamour; 123 – David Junior; 123 – Oratorio
Long	130 – Hurricane Run	124 – Afleet Alex	130 – Hurricane Run
Extended	118 – Deep Impact	not listed	118 – Deep Impact
Fillies and Mares
	All Surfaces	Dirt	Turf
All Distances	122 – Divine Proportions	118 – Pleasant Home	122 – Divine Proportions
Sprint	not listed	not listed	not listed
Mile	122 – Divine Proportions	118 – Pleasant Home	122 – Divine Proportions
Intermediate	120 – Cesario	not listed	120 – Cesario
Long	121 – Shawanda	not listed	121 – Shawanda
Extended	not listed	not listed	not listed
Three-Year-Olds
	All Surfaces	Dirt	Turf
All Distances	130 – Hurricane Run	124 – Afleet Alex	130 – Hurricane Run
Sprint	119 – Lost in the Fog; 119 – Silver Train	119 – Lost in the Fog; 119 – Silver Train	117 – Goodricke
Mile	125 – Shamardal	120 – Bellamy Road	125 – Shamardal
Intermediate	124 – Afleet Alex	124 – Afleet Alex	123 – David Junior; 123 – Oratorio
Long	130 – Hurricane Run	124 – Afleet Alex	130 – Hurricane Run
Extended	118 – Deep Impact	not listed	118 – Deep Impact
