= Sinndar =

Irish-bred Thoroughbred racehorse (1996–2018)

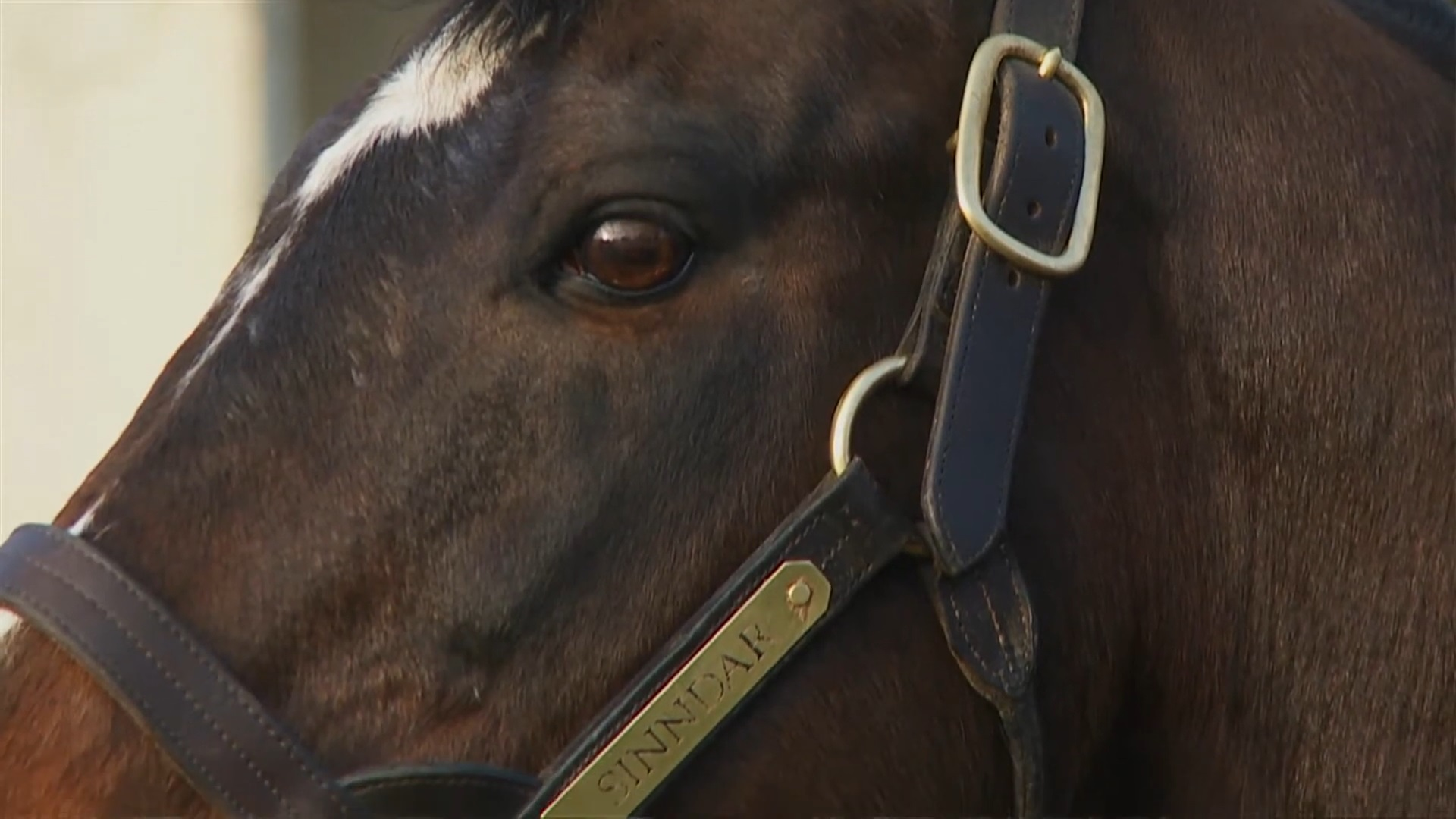
- Sinndar (close-up) in 2016
- Sire: Grand Lodge
- Grandsire: Chief's Crown
- Dam: Sinntara
- Damsire: Lashkari
- Sex: Stallion
- Foaled: 1997
- Country: Ireland
- Colour: Bay
- Breeder: HH Aga Khan IV
- Owner: HH Aga Khan IV
- Trainer: John Oxx
- Record: 8: 7-1-0
- Earnings: £2,500,000

Major wins
- National Stakes (1999); Derrinstown Stud Derby Trial (2000); Epsom Derby (2000); Irish Derby Stakes (2000); Prix Niel (2000); Prix de l'Arc de Triomphe (2000)

Awards
- European Champion Three-Year-Old Colt (2000)

Honours
- Timeform rating: 135
- Last updated on 13 March 2025

Sinndar (27 February 1997 – 26 November 2018) was an Irish Thoroughbred racehorse and sire. In a racing career that lasted from September 1999 until October 2000, he ran eight times and won seven times. He was notable for his unique achievement in winning the Derby, Irish Derby and Prix de l'Arc de Triomphe in the same year.

== Background ==
Sinndar, a dark-coated bay horse with a white stripe and white hind feet, was bred by his owner the Aga Khan in Ireland. He was sired by Grand Lodge out of the mare Sinntara. Apart from Sinndar, Grand Lodge (winner of the Dewhurst Stakes and the St James's Palace Stakes) sired the winners of over six hundred races including Grandera, Indian Lodge (Prix du Moulin de Longchamp, Prix de la Forêt) and Queens Logic (undefeated two-year-old champion). Sinntara was a staying Listed race winner, descended from a highly successful family which had been established by Marcel Boussac. As a descendant of the broodmare Tourzima, Sinntara was from the same branch of Thoroughbred Family 13-c which produced Darshaan, Acamas (Prix du Jockey Club), Akarad (Grand Prix de Saint-Cloud) and Akiyda (Prix de l'Arc de Triomphe). His pedigree was seen as combining speed on his sire's side with stamina from his dam.

Like many of his owner's horses, he was sent into training with John Oxx near the Curragh, County Kildare, Ireland. Sinndar was ridden in all his races by the stable jockey, Johnny Murtagh.

== Racing career ==
=== 1999: two-year-old season ===
Sinndar did not appear on the racecourse until the September of his two-year-old season when he ran in a maiden race at his local course, the Curragh. Starting the Evens favourite, he took the lead in the final furlong and won "comfortably" by one and a half lengths from Rainbow And Gold, with the future Melbourne Cup winner Media Puzzle a neck away in third place.

Only two weeks after his debut, having never previously run in a Conditions race, Sinndar was sent to contest Ireland's most important two-year-old race, the National Stakes over the same course and distance. He was regarded as a serious candidate, starting at odds of 7/1, but the overwhelming favourite was the Aidan O'Brien-trained Bernstein, who started at 4/11. Bernstein led from the start, and went clear of his opponents, but suddenly weakened inside the final furlong and was passed by the 50/1 outsider Murawwi. Sinndar, who had been apparently struggling to make an impression, began to stay on strongly, catching first Bernstein and then Murawwi to win the Group One prize by a head. After the race, Oxx characterised the horse as "tough and very honest" whilst the Aga Khan expressed his view that Sinndar had the potential to win more important races over longer distances.

=== 2000: three-year-old season ===
==== Spring ====
In 2000, Sinndar was clearly aimed at a staying campaign, bypassing the usual Guineas trials and opening his season with a run in the Listed Ballysax Stakes. The race is one in which horses carry extra weight according to races they have already won, making it, unofficially, a form of handicap. As a Group One winner, Sinndar carried seven pounds more than his three opponents, and he was only third in the betting. Johnny Murtagh attempted to make all the running on Sinndar, but the colt was caught inside the final furlong and beaten a head by the Dermot Weld-trained Grand Finale, with the pair finishing fifteen lengths clear of the other two runners. It proved to be Sinndar's only defeat.

A month later, in the Derrinstown Stud Derby Trial, Sinndar again gave seven pounds to the other runners, who included his stable companion Shawandi, who was in the race to set the pace, and the unbeaten Bach from Aidan O'Brien's Ballydoyle stable. Sinndar and Bach were made joint favourites and dominated the finish after Shawandi gave up the lead in the straight. Both colts ran on strongly under pressure, with Sinndar winning by a head.

==== Summer ====
Sinndar's next race was the Derby, although until just before the race, the possibility of firm ground at Epsom had led Oxx to consider running the colt in the Prix du Jockey Club- the French Derby instead. Despite the late withdrawal of the 2,000 Guineas winner King's Best, the field for the 2000 Derby was a strong one, and Sinndar was fourth in the betting behind Sakhee, Beat Hollow and the Ballydoyle-trained Racing Post Trophy winner Aristotle, with Best of the Bests, representing Godolphin also well supported. Oxx was confident of a prominent showing, saying, "Our fellow will run well and I'll be disappointed if he doesn't run a cracking race and be involved in the finish".

In the race, Sinndar ran close behind the leaders, and as the runners entered the straight he was fourth, behind Best of the Bests, Sakhee and the Henry Cecil-trained Wellbeing. A quarter mile from the finish, Richard Hills sent Sakhee to the front and went into a clear lead, but he was then challenged by Murtagh and Sinndar. The two colts raced together for a few strides, but inside the final furlong Sinndar pulled ahead to win by a length. It was five lengths back to Beat Hollow in third and another four back to Best of the Bests in fourth.

The Irish Derby featured an anticipated meeting between Sinndar and the English-trained Holding Court, who had won the Prix du Jockey Club- the French Derby- by six lengths on soft ground. Timeform rated the colts only one pound apart. The ground at the Curragh was also soft (officially "yielding"), but Sinndar was preferred in the betting at 11/10, with Holding Court 9/4. Sinndar was moved into the lead in the last quarter mile and pulled steadily away from the field to win by nine lengths, despite being eased down by Johnny Murtagh near the finish, in what was described as "one of the great Classic performances". Holding Court finished sixth. The win also earned Sinndar's owners a bonus of $1,000,000 from the race's sponsors for winning both the English and Irish Derbies. Oxx revealed that winning the race fulfilled an ambition that had begun thirty-eight years earlier, when he had watched Arctic Storm, trained by his father, narrowly defeated in the 1962 running of the race.

==== Autumn ====
Sinndar was prepared for the Prix de l'Arc de Triomphe with a run in the Prix Niel over the same course and distance in September. The Niel often attracts the best colts in France (Montjeu and Hurricane Run were among the recent previous winners), but the opposition to Sinndar in the 2000 race was relatively weak. After taking over from his pacemaker Raypour at the start of the straight Sinndar pulled clear and beat Crimson Quest by eight lengths. Oxx was "very happy" with the performance, whilst being realistic about the quality of the opposition.

In October, Sinndar attempted to become the first winner of both The Derby and the Irish Derby to win the Arc. The previous colts to attempt the feat had been Nijinsky (second in 1970), Troy (third in 1979), Shahrastani (fourth in 1986), Kahyasi (sixth in 1988) and Generous (eighth in 1991). By far his most dangerous rival was expected to be the 1999 Arc winner Montjeu, who had won eight of his last nine starts, including six Group Ones, and was described as being "on the verge of immortality". Montjeu was made 4/5 favourite ahead of Sinndar at 6/4, with the unbeaten German colt Samum, and the Prix Vermeille winner Volvoreta the only other runners to start at less than 25/1.

Sinndar led in the very early stages, before settling into second behind his pacemaker Raypour. Murtagh sent Sinndar past Raypour and into the lead at the start of the straight. Several horses attempted to challenge, with the filly Egyptband looking the biggest threat to the leader, but Sinndar stayed on to win by one and a half lengths. It was three lengths back to Volvoreta in third and a further two and a half lengths back to Montjeu in fourth. Murtagh was effusive in his praise of Sinndar's speed and stamina, saying, "No horse can get by him... he's the best horse... unbeatable". However, Montjeu's trainer, John Hammond, observed that "You always think there's going to come a day when they don't quite fire and that happened today".

Feeling that the colt had "nothing left to prove", Sinndar's connections announced his retirement ten days later.

== Race record ==
Date	Race	Dist (f)	Course	Class	Prize (£K)	Odds	Runners	Placing	Margin	Time	Jockey	Trainer
5 September 1999	Dance Design EBF Maiden	8	Curragh	M	4	Evens	13	1	1.5	1:41.80	Johnny Murtagh	John Oxx
19 September 1999	National Stakes	8	Curragh	1	104	7-1	8	1	Head	1:46.20	Johnny Murtagh	John Oxx
16 April 2000	Ballysax Stakes	10	Leopardstown	L	13	5-2	4	2	Head	2:19.70	Johnny Murtagh	John Oxx
14 May 2000	Derrinstown Stud Derby Trial	10	Leopardstown	3	28	7-4	4	1	Head	2:04.90	Johnny Murtagh	John Oxx
10 June 2000	Epsom Derby	12	Epsom	1	609	7-1	15	1	1	2:36.75	Johnny Murtagh	John Oxx
2 July 2000	Irish Derby	12	Curragh	1	385	11-10	11	1	9	2:33.90	Johnny Murtagh	John Oxx
10 September 2000	Prix Niel	12	Longchamp	2	38	3-10	6	1	8	2:26.40	Johnny Murtagh	John Oxx
1 October 2000	Prix de l'Arc de Triomphe	12	Longchamp	1	576	6-4	10	1	1.5	2:25.80	Johnny Murtagh	John Oxx

== Assessment ==
For his performances in 2000, Sinndar was voted European Champion Three-Year-Old Colt. He was then beaten in a separate poll for the Cartier Horse of the Year title by a rival three-year-old colt, the miler Giant's Causeway.

In the International Classification (the forerunner of the World Thoroughbred Racehorse Rankings) Sinndar was named the best three-year-old in the world and the second best racehorse of in 2000 with a rating of 132, two pounds behind Dubai Millennium (134) and five pounds ahead of Giant's Causeway.

Sinndar was given a Timeform rating of 135 following his Arc win.

== Stud career ==
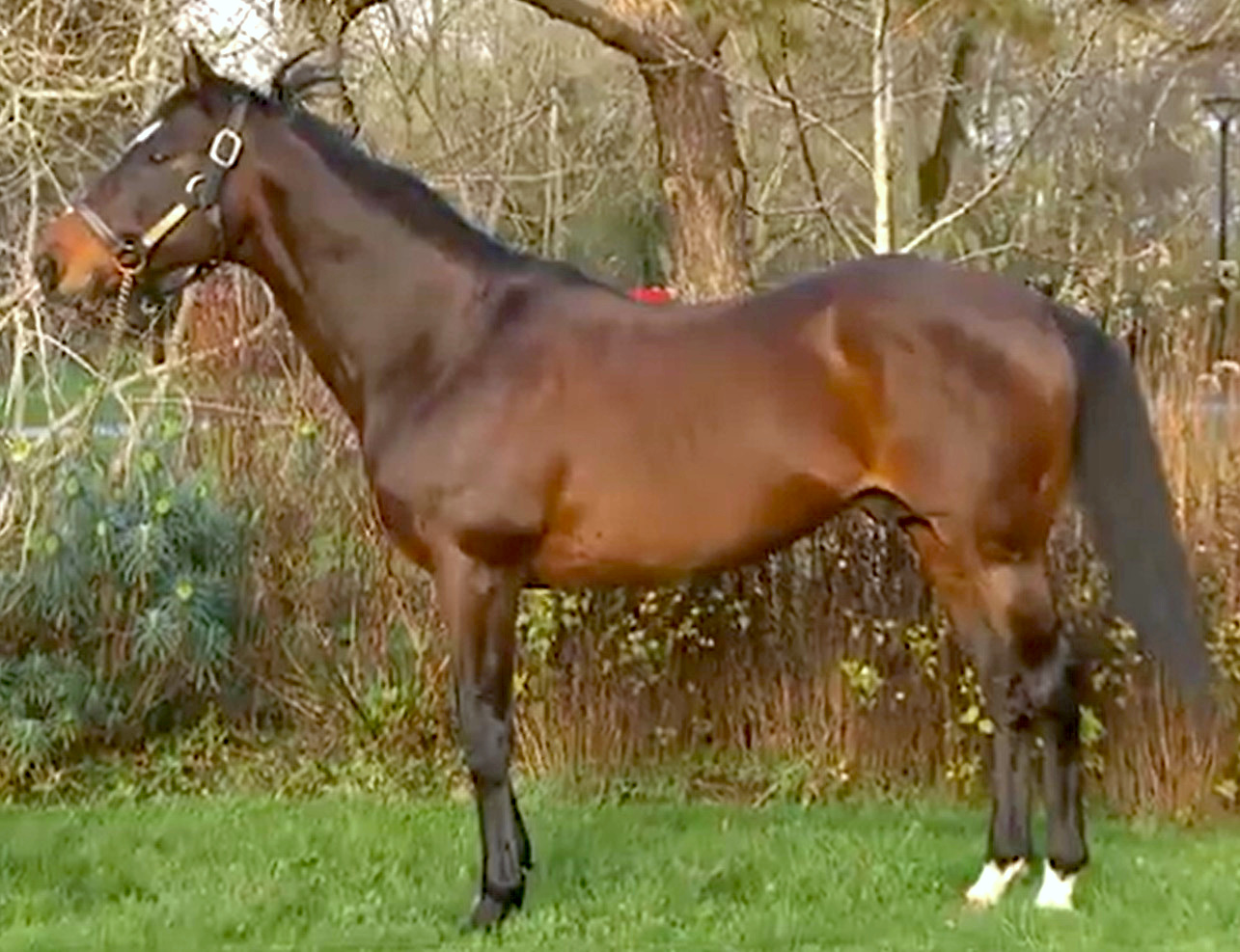
Sinndar in 2016

After being retired from racing, Sinndar stood at the Aga Khan's two main studs moving between the Haras de Bonneval in Le Mesnil-Mauger in Lower Normandy, and the Gilltown Stud in County Kildare.

He sired the winners of more than 200 races including Shawanda (dam of Encke), Youmzain and Rosanara (Prix Marcel Boussac) and Shareta finished second to Danedream in the 2011 Arc. Sinndar's son, Sinnbad has also been to Royal Windsor Horse Show and Horse of the Year Show for ROR Showing, as well as winning many area dressage finals and the Sunshine Tour championship 2017.

He was moved to the Haras National du Lion d'Angers in 2015 and was retired from stud duty on 2017. His death was reported on 26 November 2018.

== Pedigree ==
Pedigree of Sinndar (IRE) bay stallion 1997
Sire Grand Lodge (USA) 1991	Chief's Crown (USA) 1982	Danzig	Northern Dancer
Sire Grand Lodge (USA) 1991	Chief's Crown (USA) 1982	Danzig	Pas de Nom
Sire Grand Lodge (USA) 1991	Chief's Crown (USA) 1982	Six Crowns	Secretariat
Sire Grand Lodge (USA) 1991	Chief's Crown (USA) 1982	Six Crowns	Chris Evert
Sire Grand Lodge (USA) 1991	La Papagena (GB) 1983	Habitat	Sir Gaylord
Sire Grand Lodge (USA) 1991	La Papagena (GB) 1983	Habitat	Little Hut
Sire Grand Lodge (USA) 1991	La Papagena (GB) 1983	Magic Flute	Tudor Melody
Sire Grand Lodge (USA) 1991	La Papagena (GB) 1983	Magic Flute	Filigrana
Dam Sinntara (IRE) 1989	Lashkari (GB) 1981	Mill Reef	Never Bend
Dam Sinntara (IRE) 1989	Lashkari (GB) 1981	Mill Reef	Milan Mill
Dam Sinntara (IRE) 1989	Lashkari (GB) 1981	Larannda	Right Royal
Dam Sinntara (IRE) 1989	Lashkari (GB) 1981	Larannda	Morning Calm
Dam Sinntara (IRE) 1989	Sidama (IRE) 1982	Top Ville	High Top
Dam Sinntara (IRE) 1989	Sidama (IRE) 1982	Top Ville	Sega Ville
Dam Sinntara (IRE) 1989	Sidama (IRE) 1982	Stoyana	Abdos
Dam Sinntara (IRE) 1989	Sidama (IRE) 1982	Stoyana	Bielka (Family 13-c)
