= Encke (horse) =

American-bred Thoroughbred racehorse

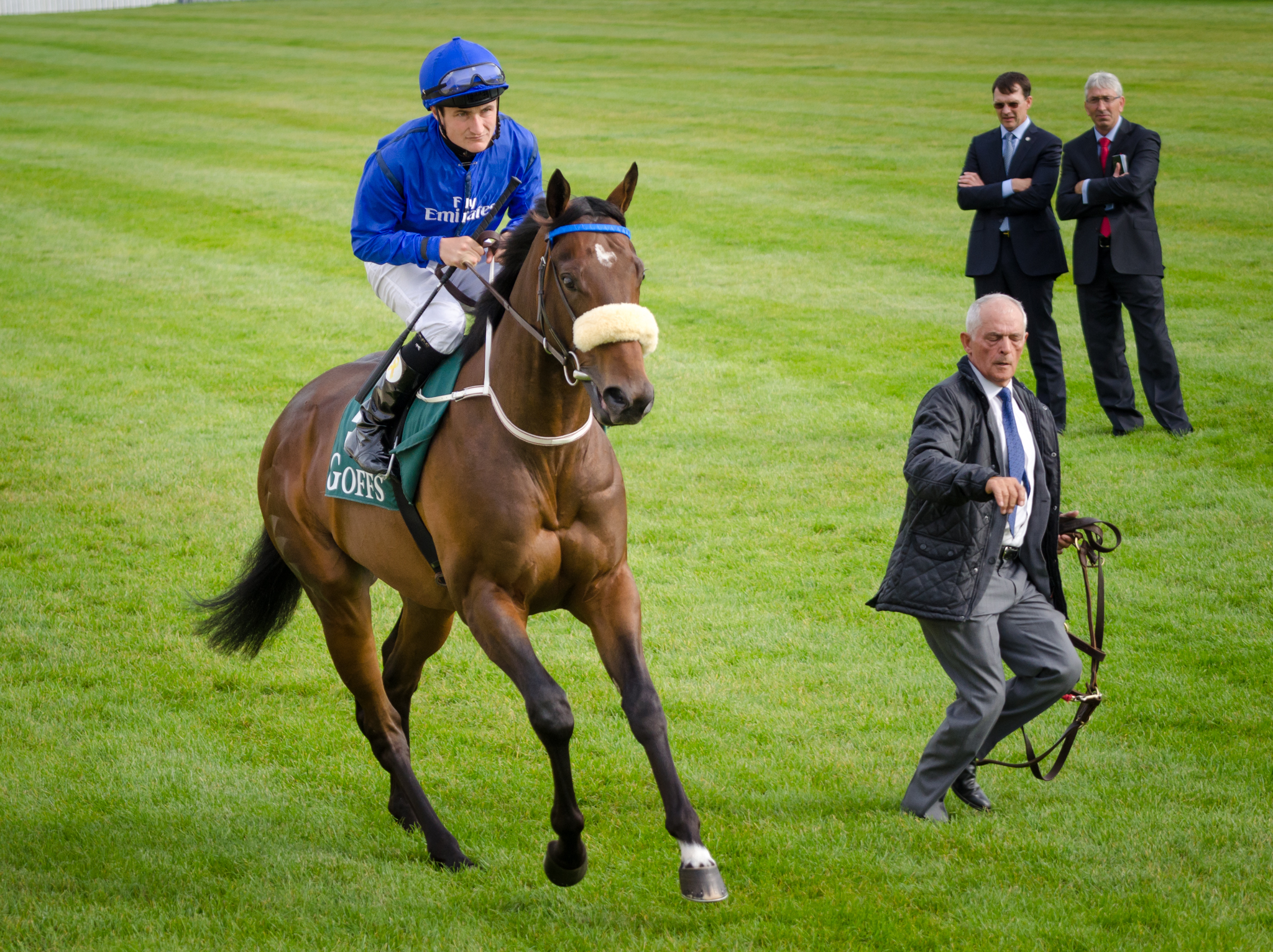
- Encke on 14 September 2014 for the Irish St. Leger
- Sire: Kingmambo
- Grandsire: Mr. Prospector
- Dam: Shawanda
- Damsire: Sinndar
- Sex: Stallion
- Foaled: 24 February 2009
- Died: 14 October 2014 (aged 5)
- Country: United Kingdom
- Colour: Brown
- Breeder: Darley Stud
- Owner: Godolphin Racing
- Trainer: Mahmood Al Zarooni; Charlie Appleby
- Record: 9:3–3–3
- Earnings: £397,830

Major wins
- St Leger Stakes (2012)

Encke (24 February 2009 – 14 October 2014) was an American-bred, British-trained Thoroughbred racehorse, best known for winning the classic St Leger Stakes at Doncaster Racecourse on 15 September 2012 when he defeated the Triple Crown bid of Camelot. In spring of 2013 Encke was banned from racing after failing a drug test. He returned to racing in 2014 and was placed in three races including the Irish St. Leger. He sustained a fatal injury in training in October 2014.

== Background ==
Encke, named after Encke's Comet, was a bay horse with a narrow white stripe bred in Kentucky by the Darley Stud. He was sired by Kingmambo, whose other progeny include the British Classic winners Russian Rhythm, King's Best, Henrythenavigator Virginia Waters and Rule of Law as well as major winners in Japan (El Condor Pasa and King Kamehameha), France (Divine Proportions) and the United States (Lemon Drop Kid). Encke was the second foal of his dam, Shawanda, a top class racemare who won the Irish Oaks and the Prix Vermeille for her owner the Aga Khan in 2005. At the end of her racing career she was bought by Sheikh Mohammed to become a broodmare for his Darley Stud. Her first foal was Encke's full brother Genius Beast, who won the Sandown Classic Trial in 2011. Encke raced in the colours of the Maktoum family's Godolphin Racing organisation and was trained by Mahmood Al Zarooni.

== Racing career ==
=== 2011: two-year-old season ===
Encke began his racing career at the 2011 St Leger meeting at Doncaster where he finished second by half a length to Perennial in a one-mile maiden race. On 1 October Encke started 8/13 favourite for a similar race at Newmarket. Ridden by Richard Hughes, he took the lead a furlong from the finish and pulled clear to win easily by four and a half lengths. The colt's owners then paid a supplementary entry fee to run Encke in the Racing Post Trophy, but he was forced to miss the race through injury.

=== 2012: three-year-old season ===
On his three-year-old debut, Encke carried 126 pounds in a handicap race over ten furlongs at Sandown Park in July. Ridden for the first time by Mickael Barzalona he took the lead two furlongs from the finish and held on to win by half a length and a neck from Ginger Jack and Tropical Beat. Later in the month, Encke was moved up in class for the Group Three Gordon Stakes at Goodwood Racecourse. The race developed into a protracted struggle between Encke and Noble Mission, who raced together throughout the final furlong before the latter won by a nose. A month later, Encke ran in the Great Voltigeur Stakes at York and finished third to Thought Worthy. According to Zarooni there were excuses for both defeats: he said that Encke had been unsuited by the course at Goodwood and the slow pace at York.

At Doncaster on 15 September Encke started a 25/1 outsider in a nine-runner field for the St Leger. The Irish colt Camelot started the 2/5 favourite to become the first British Triple Crown winner since Nijinsky after winning the 2000 Guineas and Epsom Derby. Barzalona restrained Encke in the early stages before moving up to dispute the lead in the straight. As Camelot's rider Joseph O'Brien was trying to obtain space for a clear run, Barzalona sent Encke into a clear lead approaching the final furlong and he held the challenge of Camelot to win by three quarters of a length. After the race Zarooni, who was winning his second classic following the victory of Blue Bunting in the 2011 1000 Guineas admitted that he had not wanted to run the colt in the race, but had been persuaded to do so by Sheikh Mohammed.

=== 2013: four-year-old season ===
In May 2013 Encke was one of twenty-two of Al-Zarooni's horses to test positive for anabolic steroids in an out of competition test conducted by the British Horseracing Authority. The horse was banned from racing for six months. The colt had previously passed drug tests before and after the St Leger and a BHA spokesman said that "we can be certain he was not under the benefits of substances" at the time of his classic victory.

Charlie Appleby took over the training of most of the Zarooni-trained horses, including Encke.

=== 2014: five-year-old season ===
Encke eventually returned to the racecourse on 1 August 2014, when he started the 6/1 third favourite for the Group Three Glorious Stakes at Goodwood. Ridden by William Buick, he took the lead in the straight but was overtaken and beaten one and a quarter lengths into second place by the favourite Pether's Moon. In September he was sent to Ireland for the Irish St. Leger and finished third behind Brown Panther and Leading Light. On 4 October, Encke was again matched against Pether's Moon in the Cumberland Lodge Stakes at Ascot Racecourse. He led for most of the way but was overtaken in the straight and beaten into third place behind Pether's Moon and the Irish-trained Parish Hall. On the morning of 14 October, Encke was engaged in a routine training gallop when he sustained a serious injury to a hind leg. Complications ensued and the horse was euthanised on the same day. Appleby said that "Encke was a talented racehorse and will be sorely missed as he was one of the yard's favourites".

== Pedigree ==
Pedigree of Encke (USA), bay colt, 2009
Sire Kingmambo (USA) 1990	Mr. Prospector; 1970	Raise a Native	Native Dancer
Sire Kingmambo (USA) 1990	Mr. Prospector; 1970	Raise a Native	Raise You
Sire Kingmambo (USA) 1990	Mr. Prospector; 1970	Gold Digger	Nashua
Sire Kingmambo (USA) 1990	Mr. Prospector; 1970	Gold Digger	Sequence
Sire Kingmambo (USA) 1990	Miesque; 1984	Nureyev	Northern Dancer
Sire Kingmambo (USA) 1990	Miesque; 1984	Nureyev	Special
Sire Kingmambo (USA) 1990	Miesque; 1984	Pasadoble	Prove Out
Sire Kingmambo (USA) 1990	Miesque; 1984	Pasadoble	Santa Quilla
Dam Shawanda (IRE) 2002	Sinndar; 1997	Grand Lodge	Chief's Crown
Dam Shawanda (IRE) 2002	Sinndar; 1997	Grand Lodge	La Papagena
Dam Shawanda (IRE) 2002	Sinndar; 1997	Sinntara	Lashkari
Dam Shawanda (IRE) 2002	Sinndar; 1997	Sinntara	Sidama
Dam Shawanda (IRE) 2002	Shamawna; 1989	Darshaan	Shirley Heights
Dam Shawanda (IRE) 2002	Shamawna; 1989	Darshaan	Delsy
Dam Shawanda (IRE) 2002	Shamawna; 1989	Shamsana	Nijinsky
Dam Shawanda (IRE) 2002	Shamawna; 1989	Shamsana	Shanizadeh (Family: 22-d)
