= 2005 Prix de l'Arc de Triomphe =

- Location: Longchamp Racecourse
- Date: October 2, 2005
- Winning horse: Hurricane Run

The 2005 Prix de l'Arc de Triomphe was a horse race held at Longchamp on Sunday 2 October 2005. It was the 84th running of the Prix de l'Arc de Triomphe.

The winner was Hurricane Run, a three-year-old colt trained in France by André Fabre. The winning jockey was Kieren Fallon.

== Race details ==
- Sponsor: Groupe Lucien Barrière
- Purse: €1,800,000; First prize: €1,028,520
- Going: Good to Soft
- Distance: 2,400 metres
- Number of runners: 15
- Winner's time: 2m 27.4s

== Full result ==
Pos.	Marg.	Horse	Age	Jockey	Trainer (Country)
1		Hurricane Run	3	Kieren Fallon	André Fabre (FR)
2	2	Westerner	6	Olivier Peslier	Élie Lellouche (FR)
3	1½	Bago	4	Thierry Gillet	Jonathan Pease (FR)
4	¾	Shirocco	4	Stéphane Pasquier	André Fabre (FR)
5	shd	Motivator	3	Johnny Murtagh	Michael Bell (GB)
6	1½	Shawanda	3	Christophe Soumillon	Alain de Royer-Dupré (FR)
7	1½	Pride	5	Christophe Lemaire	Alain de Royer-Dupré (FR)
8	1½	Warrsan	7	Kerrin McEvoy	Clive Brittain (GB)
9	3	Mubtaker	8	Richard Hills	Marcus Tregoning (GB)
10	1½	Scorpion	3	Michael Kinane	Aidan O'Brien (IRE)
11	6	Norse Dancer	5	John Egan	David Elsworth (GB)
12	1½	Cherry Mix	4	Frankie Dettori	Saeed bin Suroor (UAE)
13	5	Samando	5	Terence Hellier	François Doumen (FR)
14	4	Windya	3	Thierry Jarnet	Jean-Claude Rouget (FR)
15	nk	Voltmeter	3	Thierry Thulliez	Élie Lellouche (FR)

- Abbreviations: shd = short-head; nk = neck

== Winner's details ==
Further details of the winner, Hurricane Run.

- Sex: Colt
- Foaled: 13 April 2002
- Country: Ireland
- Sire: Montjeu; Dam: Hold On (Surumu)
- Owner: Michael Tabor
- Breeder: Gestüt Ammerland
