= Blenheim Stakes =

Flat horse race in Ireland

Blenheim Stakes
2026
Big Negotiator	Livenka	Nail House

Previous years
2025
Yaupon De Replay	Chicago Call	Alibah
2024
Rebel Diamond	One Smack Mac	Easy Mover
2023
Megarry	Mansa Musa	Lia Fail
2022
Beauty Crescent	Ocean Jewel	Lady Bullet
2021
Straight Answer	Glengarra	Mise Le Meas

2020-2011
2020
Lady Princess	New Treasure	Bell I Am
2019
Sir Boris	Soul Search	Zarzyni
2018
Lethal Promise	Inverleigh	Mia Mento
2017
Brick By Brick	Gobi Desert	Golden Spell
2016
Moonlit Show	Born To Be	Istan
2015
Bebhinn	Juliette Fair	Miss Katie Mae
2014
The Great War	Tamadhor	Byzantium
2013
Shining Emerald	Guerre	Monsieur Power
2012
Viztoria	Snow Queen	Tennessee Wildcat
2011
Born To Sea	Pearl In The Sand	An Ghalanta

2010-2001
2010
Longhunter	Katla	Emperor Hadrian
2009
Song Of My Heart	Wrong Answer	Mister Tee
2008
What's Up Pussycat	Roof Fiddle	Ohiyesa
2007
Rock Of Rochelle	Domingues	Deal Breaker
2006
Brave Tin Soldier	Invincible Force	Bazroy
2005
Art Museum	Leitra	An Tadh
2004
Ad Valorem	Indesatchel	Cupid's Glory
2003
Colossus	Castledale	Kurlicue
2002
Hurricane Alan	Mombassa	Danaskaya
2001
Miss Beabea	Minatonic	Alluring Park

2000-1994
2000
Black Minnaloushe	Imperial Dancer	Saying Grace
1999
Poco A Poco	Conormara	Mandama
1998
Super Goldluck	Rolo Tomasi	Cobourg Lodge
1997
Karakorum	Cloudberry	Sideman
1996
Check The Band	Fairy Song	Gan Ainm
1995
Rainbow Blues	Zafzala	Sheffield
1994
Taibhseach	Rigobertha	Tante Zoe

The Blenheim Stakes is a Listed flat horse race in Ireland open to thoroughbreds aged two years only. It is run at Fairyhouse over a distance of 6 furlongs (1,206 metres), and it is scheduled to take place each year in September.

The race was first run in 1994 and was run at the Curragh until 2014.

== Records ==
Leading jockey since 1994 (5 wins):

- Michael Kinane – Super Goldluck (1998), Black Minnaloushe (2000), Hurricane Alan (2002), Colossus (2003), Song Of My Heart (2009)

Leading trainer since 1994 (9 wins):

- Aidan O'Brien Rainbow Blues (1995), Check The Band (1996), Karakorum (1997), Black Minnaloushe (2000), Colossus (2003), Ad Valorem (2004), Art Museum (2005), Brave Tin Soldier (2006), The Great War (2014)

== Winners ==
Year	Winner	Jockey	Trainer	Time
1994	Taibhseach	Seamie Heffernan	Jim Bolger	1:27.70
1995	Rainbow Blues	Pat Shanahan	Aidan O'Brien	1:14.30
1996	Check The Band	Christy Roche	Aidan O'Brien	1:14.70
1997	Karakorum	Seamie Heffernan	Aidan O'Brien	1:15.50
1998	Super Goldluck	Michael Kinane	Dermot Weld	1:21.60
1999	Poco A Poco	Pat Shanahan	Edward Lynam	1:20.30
2000	Black Minnaloushe	Michael Kinane	Aidan O'Brien	1:16.50
2001	Miss Beabea	Declan McDonogh	Kevin Prendergast	1:11.20
2002	Hurricane Alan	Michael Kinane	Richard Hannon Sr.	1:10.90
2003	Colossus	Michael Kinane	Aidan O'Brien	1:11.90
2004	Ad Valorem	Jamie Spencer	Aidan O'Brien	1:13.90
2005	Art Museum	Kieren Fallon	Aidan O'Brien	1:13.70
2006	Brave Tin Soldier	Kieren Fallon	Aidan O'Brien	1:13.20
2007	Rock Of Rochelle	Valdir De Souza	Andrew Kinsella	1:12.21
2008	What's Up Pussycat	Johnny Murtagh	David Wachman	1:25.19
2009	Song Of My Heart	Michael Kinane	David Wachman	1:17.44
2010	Longhunter	Declan McDonogh	Kevin Prendergast	1:15.48
2011	Born To Sea	Johnny Murtagh	John Oxx	1:16.01
2012	Viztoria	Johnny Murtagh	Edward Lynam	1:17.00
2013	Shining Emerald	Chris Hayes	Paul Deegan	1:12.41
2014	The Great War	Joseph O'Brien	Aidan O'Brien	1:10.77
2015	Bebhinn	Chris Hayes	Kevin Prendergast	1:15.44
2016	Moonlit Show	Billy Lee	Charlie Fellowes	1:18.45
2017	Brick By Brick	Shane Foley	Jessica Harrington	1:19.65
2018	Lethal Promise	Billy Lee	Willie McCreery	1:14.49
2019	Sir Boris	Declan McDonogh	Tom Dascombe	1:17.18
2020	Lady Princess	Joey Sheridan	Denis Gerard Hogan	1:17.45
2021	Straight Answer	Colin Keane	Ger Lyons	1:13.40
2022	Beauty Crescent	Colin Keane	Ger Lyons	1:11.52
2023	Megarry	Gary Carroll	Gavin Cromwell	1:16.99
2024	Rebel Diamond	Billy Lee	Natalia Lupini	1:13.79
2025	Yaupon De Replay	Chris Hayes	Joseph O'Brien	1:14.41
2026	Big Negotiator	Billy Lee	Paddy Twomey	1:11.96

== See also ==
- Horse racing in Ireland
- List of Irish flat horse races
