= River Memories =

American-bred Thoroughbred racehorse

- Sire: Riverman
- Grandsire: Never Bend
- Dam: Le Vague a Lame
- Damsire: Vaguely Noble
- Sex: Filly
- Foaled: 1984
- Country: United States
- Colour: Bay
- Breeder: Alan Clore
- Owner: 1) Alan Clore; 2) Peter M. Brant
- Trainer: 1) Robert Collet; 2) D. Wayne Lukas
- Record: 35: 6-5-6
- Earnings: US$915,785 (equivalent)

Major wins
- Prix de Pomone (1987); Prix Maurice de Nieuil (1987); Prix de Royaumont (1987); Rothman's International (1987); Flower Bowl Invitational Stakes (1989)

Honours
- River Memories Stakes at Woodbine Racetrack (1996 – 2017); River Memories Stakes at Belmont Park (2015 – 2021)
- Last updated on 20 December 2023

River Memories (foaled April 17, 1984 in Kentucky) is a Thoroughbred racehorse who competed successfully in France and North America.

Bred and raced by Alan Clore, River Memories raced in France at age two and three. After her win for trainer Robert Collet in the Grade I Rothman's International at Woodbine Racetrack in Toronto, Canada she remained in North America, racing there through age five for new owner Peter M. Brant and trainer, D. Wayne Lukas. In 1989, after losing seventeen consecutive races, River Memories won the Grade I Flower Bowl Invitational Stakes at New York's, Belmont Park.

As a broodmare, River Memories has produced nine foals, none of which have met with racing success.
