= Ad Valorem (horse) =

American-bred Thoroughbred racehorse

- Racing colours of Susan Magnier
- Sire: Danzig
- Grandsire: Northern Dancer
- Dam: Classy Women
- Damsire: Relaunch
- Sex: Stallion
- Foaled: 27 April 2002
- Country: United States
- Colour: Bay
- Breeder: Calumet Farm
- Owner: Susan Magnier; Susan Magnier & Bob Ingham
- Trainer: Aidan O'Brien
- Record: 13:4-1-2
- Earnings: £444,464

Major wins
- Blenheim Stakes (2004); Middle Park Stakes (2004); Queen Anne Stakes (2006)

Awards
- Top-rated Irish-trained two-year-old (2004)

Ad Valorem (foaled 27 April 2002) is an American-bred, Irish-trained Thoroughbred racehorse and sire. He was one of the leading European two-year-olds of 2004, when he was unbeaten in three races including the Middle Park Stakes. He failed to win in 2005 but returned as a four-year-old to win the Queen Anne Stakes. Since his retirement he has had some success as a sire of winners in Australia.

== Background ==
Ad Valorem is a bay horse standing 15.3 hands high with a white blaze and four white socks bred in Kentucky by Calumet Farm. His sire Danzig, who ran only three times before his career was ended by injury, was a highly successful stallion who sired the winners of more than fifty Grade I/Group One races. His offspring include the champions Chief's Crown, Dayjur and Lure as well as the important stallion Danehill.

In August 2003, the colt was sent to the Fasig-Tipton sales at Saratoga, where he was bought for $450,000 by Thomas Magnier, acting on behalf of the Coolmore organisation. The colt raced in the colours of Susan Magnier and was trained by Aidan O'Brien at Ballydoyle.

== Racing career ==
=== 2004: two-year-old season ===
Ad Valorem did not appear on the racecourse until 5 September 2004, when he contested a six furlong maiden race at the Curragh. Ridden by Jamie Spencer, he started the 6/4 favourite and won impressively by three and half lengths from Lightwood Lady. Two weeks later Ad Valorem was moved up in class for the Listed Blenheim Stakes over the same course and distance. Starting joint-favourite at odds of 9/4 he took the lead approaching the final furlong and won by length from Indesatchel. Two weeks after his win in the Blenheim Stakes, the colt was sent to England for the Group One Middle Park Stakes at Newmarket Racecourse where he was made the 9/2 second favourite in a field of nine colts. Spencer tracked the leaders before sending Ad Valorem into the lead a furlong from the finish. He won by three quarters of a length from Rebuttal, with the favourite Iceman two and a half lengths further back in third. Commenting on Ad Valorem's success, O'Brien said: "He's a lovely horse. He won his maiden very smoothly then he won a stakes very easily next time – that's why we came here. He was always finding enough today and seemed well on top at the line but he's got a lot of natural speed."

In the official International Classification, Ad Valorem was given a rating of 121 pounds, equal with Dubawi and one pound below the top-rated Shamardal.

=== 2005: three-year-old season ===
Ad Valorem did not race in the spring of 2005 missing an intended run in the Irish 2,000 Guineas. O'Brien explained that he wanted to give the colt more time after his three races in quick succession as a two-year-old. He did not appear until June, when he contested the St James's Palace Stakes, run that year at York Racecourse. Ridden by Mick Kinane he finished second, three lengths behind the winner Shamardal and one and three quarter lengths ahead of his stable companion Oratorio. In July he was made the 6/4 favourite for the Prix Jean Prat at Chantilly Racecourse, but finished fifth of the eight runners behind Turtle Bowl. In the Group One Sussex Stakes at Goodwood Racecourse, Ad Valorem was tested against older horses for the first time and led for most of the way before finishing third behind Proclamation and Soviet Song.

In the autumn of 2005, Ad Valorem was sent to compete in the United States, but had little success. He finished sixth in the Shadwell Turf Mile Stakes at Keeneland on 8 October and ninth in the Breeders' Cup Mile at Belmont Park three weeks later.

=== 2006: four-year-old season ===
Ad Valorem returned for a third season, beginning at the Curragh in April when he finished a distant sixth in the Gladness Stakes. Following this race a half share in the colt was sold to the New South Wales-based Woodlands Stud, and he raced from then on as the property of a partnership between Susan Magnier and Bob Ingham. The colt had gone twenty months without a win when he was sent to Royal Ascot for the Group One Queen Anne Stakes over one mile. Ridden by Kieren Fallon, he was the 13/2 fourth choice in the betting behind Peeress, Proclamation and Court Masterpiece. The colt appeared to be struggling at half way but rallied strongly when Fallon switched him to the right in the final quarter mile. He took the lead inside the final furlong and won by one and a half lengths from Court Masterpiece. The racecourse stewards called an enquiry into the race, as the winner appeared to have caused interference to both Court Masterpiece and Peeress but although Fallon was given a four-day suspension, the result was allowed to stand. His final European race was the Prix Jacques Le Marois at Deauville Racecourse in August. O'Brien expressed his doubts about running the colt on soft ground and his concerns appeared justified as Ad Valorem finished fifth of the ten runners behind Librettist.

As in the previous season, Ad Valorem was sent to race in North America in the Autumn. He produced his best effort in the Woodbine Mile, in which he carried top weight of 124 pounds into third place behind Becrux. On his final appearance, he finished thirteenth of the fourteen runners in the Breeders' Cup Mile.

== Assessment ==
As noted above, Ad Valorem was rated the joint second-best two-year-old in Europe in 2004. In the 2005 World Thoroughbred Racehorse Rankings, Ad Valorem was given a rating of 116, making him the 89th best racehorse in the world. In the following year his mark improved to 117, making him the 72nd best racehorse in the world, twelve pounds below the top rated Invasor.

== Stud record ==
Ad Valorem was retired from racing to become a shuttle stallion, standing at Coolmore's Irish base before spending the southern hemisphere breeding season at the Woodlands Stud. In 2008 he became partly owned by the Darley Stud, which purchased Woodlands. His biggest success has been in Australia where his winners have included the Group race winners Uate (Skyline Stakes), Free Wheeling (Champagne Classic), Detours (How Now Stakes), Meliora (Angus Armanasco Stakes) and Pied a Terre (Autumn Stakes).

== Pedigree ==
Pedigree of Ad Valorem (USA), bay stallion, 2002
Sire Danzig (USA) 1977	Northern Dancer (CAN); 1961	Nearctic	Nearco
Sire Danzig (USA) 1977	Northern Dancer (CAN); 1961	Nearctic	Lady Angela
Sire Danzig (USA) 1977	Northern Dancer (CAN); 1961	Natalma	Native Dancer
Sire Danzig (USA) 1977	Northern Dancer (CAN); 1961	Natalma	Almahmoud
Sire Danzig (USA) 1977	Pas de Nom (USA); 1968	Admiral's Voyage	Crafty Admiral
Sire Danzig (USA) 1977	Pas de Nom (USA); 1968	Admiral's Voyage	Olympia Lou
Sire Danzig (USA) 1977	Pas de Nom (USA); 1968	Petitioner	Petition
Sire Danzig (USA) 1977	Pas de Nom (USA); 1968	Petitioner	Steady Aim
Dam Classy Women (USA) 1988	Relaunch (USA); 1976	In Reality	Intentionally
Dam Classy Women (USA) 1988	Relaunch (USA); 1976	In Reality	My Dear Girl
Dam Classy Women (USA) 1988	Relaunch (USA); 1976	Foggy Note	The Axe
Dam Classy Women (USA) 1988	Relaunch (USA); 1976	Foggy Note	Silver Song
Dam Classy Women (USA) 1988	Aironlass (USA); 1979	Proud Clarion	Hail to Reason
Dam Classy Women (USA) 1988	Aironlass (USA); 1979	Proud Clarion	Breath o'Morn
Dam Classy Women (USA) 1988	Aironlass (USA); 1979	Classic Perfection	Never Bend
Dam Classy Women (USA) 1988	Aironlass (USA); 1979	Classic Perfection	Mira Femme (Family: 5-f)
