= Prix de Royaumont =

Flat horse race in France

- Class: Group 3
- Location: Chantilly Racecourse; Chantilly, France
- Inaugurated: 1883
- Race type: Flat / Thoroughbred
- Website: france-galop.com

Race information
- Distance: 2,400 metres (1½ miles)
- Surface: Turf
- Track: Right-handed
- Qualification: Three-year-old fillies excluding Group winners
- Weight: 57 kg
- Purse: €80,000 (2022); 1st: €40,000

Prix de Royaumont
2025
Sunly	Indalimos	Eleganz

Previous years
2024
Aventure	Vigatata	Mosaique
2023
Ottery	Boogie Woogie	Engaliwe
2022
Baiykara	Manisha	Duchess Of Dubai
2021
Thunder Drum	Ricla	Omnia Munda Mundis

2020–2011
2020
Ebaiyra	American Apples	Mozzarella
2019
Pelligrina	Malevra	Je Ne Regretterien
2018
Pollara	Waldlied	Contessa Du Barry
2017
Kitesurf	Bebe D'Amour	Lady Paname
2016
The Juliet Rose	Al Wathna	Armande
2015
Kataniya	Sea Calisi	Ame Bleue
2014
Savanne	Ball Dancing	Zarshana
2013
Eleuthera	Orion Love	Dance In The Park
2012
Sediciosa	Yellow And Green	Mandistana
2011
Testosterone	Chegei Has	Campanillas

2010–2001
2010
Lady's Purse	Pearl Away	Never Forget
2009
Quetsche	Shamakiya	Becqu Adoree
2008
Sub Rose	Treat Gently	Balladeuse
2007
Legerete	La Hernanda	Artistica
2006
Minatlya	Ponte Tresa	Anna Mona
2005
Shawanda	Royal Highness	Asi Siempre
2004
Silverskaya	Kalatuna	Reverie Solitaire
2003
Diasilixa	Aynthia	Suborneuse
2002
Dance Routine	Mer De Corail	Darinska
2001
Volga	Moon Queen	Pescia

2000–1998
2000
Sadler's Flag	Flawly	Maeander
1999
Side Saddle	White Star	Sage Et Jolie
1998
Cantilever	Fille Du Lac	Chine

The Prix de Royaumont is a Group 3 flat horse race in France open to three-year-old thoroughbred fillies. It is run at Chantilly over a distance of 2,400 metres (about 1½ miles), and it is scheduled to take place each year in late May or early June.

== History ==
The event is named after Royaumont Abbey, an abbey located 12 km from Chantilly. The race was established in 1883, and it was originally contested over 2,100 metres. It was initially reserved for fillies considered below the standard required for the Prix de Diane, which used to be run on the same day.

The Prix de Royaumont was abandoned throughout World War I, with no running from 1915 to 1918. The first two post-war editions were staged at Longchamp.

The race was cancelled once during World War II, in 1940. It was held at Longchamp in 1941 and 1942, and at Le Tremblay with a distance of 2,150 metres in 1943 and 1944. It was contested at Longchamp for the following three years, and it returned to Chantilly in 1948.

The Prix de Royaumont was not run in 1975 because of a strike by stable lads. A new schedule was introduced in 1978, and the race was moved to a date earlier than that of the Prix de Diane.

The event was staged at Longchamp from 1987 to 1990, and it was transferred to Saint-Cloud in 1991. Its distance was extended to 2,400 metres in 1992, and it continued to take place at Saint-Cloud until 1996. The race's only subsequent departure from Chantilly was in 2001, when it was run at Saint-Cloud.

The Prix de Royaumont is now held on the same day as the Prix du Jockey Club.

== Records ==
Leading jockey (6 wins):

- Christophe Soumillon – Diasilixa (2003), Shawanda (2005), Sub Rose (2008), Kataniya (2015), Ebaiyra (2020), Baiykara (2022)

Leading trainer (12 wins):

- André Fabre – Galla Placidia (1985), Villandry (1991), Berceau (1992), Apogee (1993), Genovefa (1995), Legend Maker (1997), Dance Routine (2002), Diasilixa (2003), Minatlya (2006), Legerete (2007), Savanne (2014), Pelligrina (2019)

Leading owner (7 wins):

- Jean Prat – Marjolaine (1893), Cabane (1908), Musique (1921), Raflade (1926), Sesia (1931), Relique (1933), Marphise (1938)

== Winners since 1976 ==
Year	Winner	Jockey	Trainer	Owner	Time
1976	Floressa	Jean-Pierre Lefèvre	Philippe Lallié	Lawrence M. Gelb	2:11.5
1977	Waya	Yves Saint-Martin	Angel Penna Sr.	Daniel Wildenstein
1978	La Dorga	Freddy Head	Alec Head	Jacques Wertheimer
1979	Producer	Alain Lequeux	Maurice Zilber	Roy Gottlieb
1980	Luth Music	Michel Jerome	E. Chevalier du Fau	Jacques Dorise
1981	Snow Day	Philippe Paquet	François Boutin	Ernst Wiget
1982	Vidor	Cash Asmussen	Maurice Zilber	Nelson Bunker Hunt
1983	Marie de Litz	Henri Samani	David Smaga	Jules Sabban
1984	Odyssee	Jean-Claude Desaint	John Cunnington Jr.	Adolphe Boccara
1985	Galla Placidia	Lester Piggott	André Fabre	William Kazan
1986	Reloy	Cash Asmussen	Jonathan Pease	Nelson Bunker Hunt
1987	River Memories	Alain Lequeux	Robert Collet	Alan Clore
1988	Truly Special	Alain Lequeux	Robert Collet	Richard C. Strauss	2:12.9
1989	Bellarida	Guy Guignard	Criquette Head	Jacques Wertheimer	2:11.1
1990	Miss Alleged	Dominique Boeuf	Pascal Bary	Ecurie I. M. Fares	2:13.1
1991	Villandry	Dominique Boeuf	André Fabre	Daniel Wildenstein	2:15.2
1992	Berceau	Pat Eddery	André Fabre	Khalid Abdullah	2:42.3
1993	Apogee	Thierry Jarnet	André Fabre	Khalid Abdullah	2:33.5
1994	Truly a Dream	William Mongil	Robert Collet	Richard C. Strauss	2:41.0
1995	Genovefa	Thierry Jarnet	André Fabre	Sheikh Mohammed	2:41.9
1996	Spanish Falls	Freddy Head	Criquette Head	Sheikh Mohammed	2:46.7
1997	Legend Maker	Thierry Jarnet	André Fabre	Michael Tabor	2:33.6
1998	Cantilever	Olivier Doleuze	Criquette Head	Khalid Abdullah	2:40.5
1999	Side Saddle	Dominique Boeuf	David Smaga	Lord Weinstock	2:37.3
2000	Sadler's Flag	Olivier Doleuze	Criquette Head	Wertheimer et Frère	2:32.0
2001	Volga	Dominique Boeuf	Élie Lellouche	Daniel Wildenstein	2:36.3
2002	Dance Routine	Olivier Peslier	André Fabre	Khalid Abdullah	2:29.8
2003	Diasilixa	Christophe Soumillon	André Fabre	Lagardère Family	2:29.5
2004	Silverskaya	Ioritz Mendizabal	Jean-Claude Rouget	Earl Champ Gignoux	2:36.2
2005	Shawanda	Christophe Soumillon	Alain de Royer-Dupré	Aga Khan IV	2:33.1
2006	Minatlya	Stéphane Pasquier	André Fabre	HH Aga Khan IV	2:31.5
2007	Legerete	Olivier Peslier	André Fabre	Wertheimer et Frère	2:30.4
2008	Sub Rose	Christophe Soumillon	Alain de Royer-Dupré	6C Racing Ltd	2:31.5
2009	Quetsche	Christophe Lemaire	Jean-Claude Rouget	Ecurie des Monceaux	2:33.1
2010	Lady's Purse	Maxime Guyon	Henri-Alex Pantall	Sheikh Mohammed	2:31.7
2011	Testosterone	Stéphane Pasquier	Pascal Bary	Ecurie La Boetie	2:31.2
2012	Sediciosa	Grégory Benoist	Yann Barberot	Maurice Lagasse	2:30.0
2013	Eleuthera	Eddy Hardouin	Philippe Demercastel	Mme Philippe Demercastel	2:31.8
2014	Savanne	Pierre-Charles Boudot	André Fabre	Gestut Ammerland	2:32.89
2015	Kataniya	Christophe Soumillon	Alain de Royer-Dupré	Aga Khan IV	2:30.42
2016	The Juliet Rose	Stéphane Pasquier	Nicolas Clement	Mayfair Speculators & Equifrance Holdings	2:41.22
2017	Kitesurf	Mickael Barzalona	André Fabre	Godolphin	2:29.62
2018	Pollara	Olivier Peslier	Francis-Henri Graffard	Allen Stable	2:32.57
2019	Pelligrina	Pierre-Charles Boudot	André Fabre	Mohammed bin Hamad bin Khalifa Al Thani	2:25.99
2020	Ebaiyra	Christophe Soumillon	Alain de Royer-Dupré	Aga Khan IV	2:29.86
2021	Thunder Drum	Eddy Hardouin	Jerome Reynier	Lady Bamford	2:33.11
2022	Baiykara	Christophe Soumillon	Francis-Henri Graffard	Aga Khan IV	2:31.09
2023	Ottery	Bauyrzhan Murzabayev	André Fabre	Executors of the late K Abdullah	2:25.99
2024	Aventure	Maxime Guyon	Christophe Ferland	Wertheimer et Frère	2:31.27
2025	Sunly	Christophe Soumillon	Francis-Henri Graffard	Juddmonte	2:27.76
2026	Behrayna	Mickael Barzalona	Francis-Henri Graffard	Aga Khan Studs SCEA	2:30:35

== Earlier winners ==
- 1883: Stresa
- 1884: Geneve
- 1885: Althea
- 1886: Estelle
- 1887: La Delivrande
- 1888: Modena
- 1889: Perle Rose
- 1890: Fatuite
- 1891: Amazone
- 1892:
- 1893: Marjolaine
- 1894: Algarade
- 1895: Phoebe
- 1896: Ecrevisse
- 1897: The Shrew
- 1898: Goguette
- 1899: Olympie
- 1900: May Queen
- 1901: Visitandine
- 1902: Karamanie
- 1903: Wide Awake
- 1904: Zingara
- 1905: Marie Galante
- 1906: Blue Fly
- 1907: La Neuville
- 1908: Cabane
- 1909: La Chandeleur
- 1910: Basse Pointe
- 1911: Allamanda
- 1912: La Semillante
- 1913: Coraline
- 1914: Aurore Boreale
- 1915–18: no race
- 1919: Furlana
- 1920: Chaine d'Or
- 1921: Musique
- 1922: Shocking
- 1923: Pomare
- 1924: Tetratela
- 1925: Tagus
- 1926: Raflade
- 1927: Samphire
- 1928: Likka
- 1929: La Mie au Gue
- 1930: L'Abbesse de Menin
- 1931: Sesia
- 1932: Fee Esterel
- 1933: Relique
- 1934: Brunanburh
- 1935: Finlandaise
- 1936: Cousine
- 1937: Gandara
- 1938: Marphise
- 1939: Pereire
- 1940: no race
- 1941: Green Parrot
- 1942: The Residency
- 1943: Vertelle
- 1944:
- 1945: Theorie
- 1946: Miss Foxlight
- 1947: Picardie
- 1948: Sans Toi / Seduction *
- 1949: L'Oasis
- 1950: Hortensia
- 1951: Monrovia
- 1952: Devinette
- 1953: Deep Sea
- 1954: Reine d'Atout
- 1955: All Risk
- 1956: Fast Jane
- 1957: Ermeline
- 1958: Magic Gold
- 1959: Mi Carina
- 1960: Marie Jolie
- 1961: Belinda 111
- 1962: Chaleureuse
- 1963: Partisane
- 1964: Dreida
- 1965: Kere
- 1966: Bubunia
- 1967: Casaque Grise
- 1968: Hugger Mugger
- 1969: Agujita
- 1970: Santa Tina
- 1971: Pointilleuse
- 1972: Decigale
- 1973: Gay Style
- 1974: Azurella
- 1975: no race

* The 1948 race was a dead-heat and has joint winners.

== See also ==
- List of French flat horse races
