= King's Best =

American-bred Thoroughbred racehorse

- Sire: Kingmambo
- Grandsire: Mr. Prospector
- Dam: Allegretta
- Sex: Stallion
- Foaled: January 24, 1997
- Died: April 16, 2019 (aged 22)
- Country: USA
- Colour: Bay
- Breeder: M3 Elevage
- Owner: Saeed Suhail
- Trainer: Sir Michael Stoute
- Record: 6: 3-1-0
- Earnings: $318,390

Major wins
- 2000 Guineas Stakes (2000)
- Last updated on 20 April 2019

Kings Best (24 January 1997 – 16 April 2019) was an American-bred Thoroughbred racehorse best known for winning the 2000 Guineas Stakes. He was described by his trainer Michael Stoute as the best miler he'd ever trained.

== Background ==
King's Best was a bay horse bred in Kentucky by M3 Elevage. King's Best's sire, Kingmambo, was a highly successful breeding stallion. His progeny included the British Classic winners Russian Rhythm, Henrythenavigator, Virginia Waters and Rule of Law, as well as major winners in Japan (El Condor Pasa), France (Divine Proportions) and the United States (Lemon Drop Kid). His dam Allegretta was a very influential broodmare who also produced the Arc-winning Urban Sea, the dam of Sea the Stars and Galileo, Allez Les Trois, the dam of the Prix du Jockey Club winner Anabaa Blue, Turbaine by Trempolino dam of Tertullian by Miswaki and Anzille by Plugged Nickle dam of Anzillero by Law Society.

== Racing career ==
After winning his maiden race at Newmarket he won, from the front, in York's 1999 Acomb Stakes, a Group 3 race for juveniles. His first start as a three-year-old resulted in a second place to Umitism in the Craven Stakes at Newmarket. Few horses beaten in that race go on to win the 2000 Guineas, so it was a surprise when he claimed the first classic of the season, sprinting past Giant's Causeway from off the pace. Ridden by Kieren Fallon he sprinted to a three-and-a-half length victory.

King's Best true ability was never satisfactorily determined as injury in his next race, the Irish Derby ended his career prematurely.

== Stud career ==
Standing with Darley Stud, Kings Best sired numerous high-profile winners including Creachadoir, Royal Diamond, Allybar and Eishin Flash, but his most famous son is the Michael Stoute-trained Workforce, who won the Derby by seven lengths in 2010, followed by the Prix de l'Arc de Triomphe.

King's Best was retired from stud duties in 2019 and was Euthanized on 16 April 2019 after suffering from colic.

== Pedigree ==
Pedigree of King's Best (USA), bay stallion, 1997
Sire Kingmambo (USA) 1990	Mr. Prospector (USA); 1970	Raise a Native	Native Dancer
Sire Kingmambo (USA) 1990	Mr. Prospector (USA); 1970	Raise a Native	Raise You
Sire Kingmambo (USA) 1990	Mr. Prospector (USA); 1970	Gold Digger	Nashua
Sire Kingmambo (USA) 1990	Mr. Prospector (USA); 1970	Gold Digger	Sequence
Sire Kingmambo (USA) 1990	Miesque (USA); 1984	Nureyev	Northern Dancer
Sire Kingmambo (USA) 1990	Miesque (USA); 1984	Nureyev	Special
Sire Kingmambo (USA) 1990	Miesque (USA); 1984	Pasadoble	Prove Out
Sire Kingmambo (USA) 1990	Miesque (USA); 1984	Pasadoble	Santa Quilla
Dam Allegretta (GB) 1978	Lombard (GER); 1967	Agio	Tantieme
Dam Allegretta (GB) 1978	Lombard (GER); 1967	Agio	Aralia
Dam Allegretta (GB) 1978	Lombard (GER); 1967	Promised Lady	Prince Chevalier
Dam Allegretta (GB) 1978	Lombard (GER); 1967	Promised Lady	Belle Sauvage
Dam Allegretta (GB) 1978	Anatevka (GER); 1969	Espresso	Acropolis
Dam Allegretta (GB) 1978	Anatevka (GER); 1969	Espresso	Babylon
Dam Allegretta (GB) 1978	Anatevka (GER); 1969	Almyra	Birkhahn
Dam Allegretta (GB) 1978	Anatevka (GER); 1969	Almyra	Asterblute (Family: 9-h)
