= Kingmambo =

American-bred Thoroughbred racehorse

- Sire: Mr. Prospector
- Grandsire: Raise a Native
- Dam: Miesque
- Damsire: Nureyev
- Sex: Stallion
- Foaled: February 19, 1990
- Country: United States
- Colour: Bay
- Breeder: Flaxman Holdings
- Owner: Stavros Niarchos
- Trainer: François Boutin
- Record: 13: 5-4-2
- Earnings: $734,804

Major wins
- Prix Djebel (1993); Poule d'Essai des Poulains (1993); St. James's Palace Stakes (1993); Prix du Moulin de Longchamp (1993)
- Last updated on August 23, 2007

Kingmambo (February 19, 1990 – January 20, 2016) was an American-bred, French-trained thoroughbred racehorse and sire.

== Background ==
He was sired by the leading stallion, Mr. Prospector, who in turn was a son of Raise a Native, out of the 1999 United States Racing Hall of Fame mare Miesque, who in turn was a daughter of the great Nureyev.

Although born and bred in the U.S., Kingmambo raced in England and France for owner Stavros Niarchos. Niarchos owned both a U.S. thoroughbred farm, where his mare Miesque was stationed, and a French operation, where he did most of his racing.

== Racing career ==
=== 1992: two-year-old season ===
As a two-year-old, after winning a six furlong race at Maisons-Laffitte racecourse, Kingmambo placed second in the French Group 1, Prix de la Salamandre, the Group 3 Prix Thomas Bryon, and the Group 3 Prix de Cabourg.

=== 1993: three-year-old season ===
At the age of three, ridden by the American, Cash Asmussen, and trained by François Boutin, he won the Prix Djebel on his debut, beating Zafonic in an upset. He went on to prove himself to be a genuinely top class colt with three Group One wins in the Poule d'Essai des Poulains, the St. James's Palace Stakes and the Prix du Moulin de Longchamp.

== Stud career ==
Kingmambo was retired to stud in 1994 and stood at Lane's End Farm. He was pensioned from stud duties in 2010.

Kingmambo was euthanized at age 25 on January 20, 2016, due to the infirmities of old age. Kingmambo was eventually buried at Lane's End.

=== Major winners ===
c = colt, f = filly, g = gelding

Foaled	Name	Sex	Major Wins
1995	El Condor Pasa	c	NHK Mile Cup, Japan Cup, Grand Prix de Saint-Cloud
1996	Lemon Drop Kid	c	Belmont Futurity, Belmont Stakes, Travers Stakes, Whitney Handicap, Woodward Stakes
1997	Bluemamba	f	Poule d'Essai des Pouliches
1997	King's Best	c	2000 Guineas
1998	Malhub	c	Golden Jubilee Stakes
1998	Okawango	c	Grand Critérium
1998	Voodoo Dancer	f	Garden City Handicap, Diana Handicap
1999	Dubai Destination	c	Queen Anne Stakes
2000	Alkaased	c	Grand Prix de Saint-Cloud, Japan Cup
2000	Russian Rhythm	f	1000 Guineas, Coronation Stakes, Nassau Stakes, Lockinge Stakes
2001	Boboman	c	Hollywood Turf Cup
2001	King Kamehameha	c	NHK Mile Cup, Tokyo Yūshun
2001	Rule of Law	c	St Leger
2002	Divine Proportions	f	Prix Morny, Prix Marcel Boussac, Poule d'Essai des Pouliches, Prix de Diane, Prix d'Astarte
2002	Student Council	c	Pimlico Special, Pacific Classic
2002	Tawqeet	c	Caulfield Cup
2002	Virginia Waters	f	1000 Guineas
2004	Archipenko	c	Queen Elizabeth II Cup
2004	Light Shift	f	Epsom Oaks
2005	Campanologist	c	Deutschland Preis, Rheinland-Pokal, Preis von Europa, Gran Premio del Jockey Club
2005	Henrythenavigator	c	2000 Guineas, Irish 2000 Guineas, St James's Palace Stakes, Sussex Stakes
2005	My Kingdom of Fife	g	Queen Elizabeth Stakes (ATC)
2005	Thewayyouare	c	Critérium International
2008	Master of Hounds	c	Jebel Hatta
2009	Encke	c	St Leger

== Pedigree ==
Pedigree of Kingmambo (USA), bay stallion, 1990
Sire Mr. Prospector (USA) 1970	Raise a Native (USA); 1961	Native Dancer	Polynesian
Sire Mr. Prospector (USA) 1970	Raise a Native (USA); 1961	Native Dancer	Geisha
Sire Mr. Prospector (USA) 1970	Raise a Native (USA); 1961	Raise You	Case Ace
Sire Mr. Prospector (USA) 1970	Raise a Native (USA); 1961	Raise You	Lady Glory
Sire Mr. Prospector (USA) 1970	Gold Digger (USA); 1962	Nashua	Nasrullah
Sire Mr. Prospector (USA) 1970	Gold Digger (USA); 1962	Nashua	Segula
Sire Mr. Prospector (USA) 1970	Gold Digger (USA); 1962	Sequence	Count Fleet
Sire Mr. Prospector (USA) 1970	Gold Digger (USA); 1962	Sequence	Miss Dogwood
Dam Miesque (USA) 1984	Nureyev (USA); 1977	Northern Dancer	Nearctic
Dam Miesque (USA) 1984	Nureyev (USA); 1977	Northern Dancer	Natalma
Dam Miesque (USA) 1984	Nureyev (USA); 1977	Special	Forli
Dam Miesque (USA) 1984	Nureyev (USA); 1977	Special	Thong
Dam Miesque (USA) 1984	Pasadoble (USA); 1979	Prove Out	Graustark
Dam Miesque (USA) 1984	Pasadoble (USA); 1979	Prove Out	Equal Venture
Dam Miesque (USA) 1984	Pasadoble (USA); 1979	Santa Quilla	Sanctus
Dam Miesque (USA) 1984	Pasadoble (USA); 1979	Santa Quilla	Neriad (Family: 20)
