= Divine Proportions =

American-bred Thoroughbred racehorse

- Sire: Kingmambo
- Grandsire: Mr. Prospector
- Dam: Myth to Reality
- Damsire: Sadler's Wells
- Sex: Mare
- Foaled: 2002
- Country: United States
- Colour: Bay
- Breeder: Flaxman Holdings Ltd.
- Owner: Niarchos family
- Trainer: Pascal Bary
- Record: 10: 9-0-0
- Earnings: $907,630

Major wins
- Prix du Bois (2004); Prix Robert Papin (2004); Prix Morny (2004); Prix Marcel Boussac (2004); Prix de la Grotte (2005); Poule d'Essai des Pouliches (2005); Prix de Diane (2005); Prix d'Astarté (2005)

Awards
- European Two-Year-Old Champion Filly (2004); European Three-Year-Old Champion Filly (2005)
- Last updated on June 21, 2007

Divine Proportions (born 13 March 2002 in Kentucky) is a champion Thoroughbred race horse and winner of two French classics.

== Background ==
Divine Proportions was bred by the Niarchos family. She was sired by the American-bred stallion Kingmambo. Her dam Myth to Reality was a Group 3 winning daughter of Sadler's Wells.

== Racing career ==
During her racing career, ridden by Christophe Lemaire and trained by Pascal Bary, Divine Proportions was the winner of no fewer than five Group 1 races, including the Poule d'Essai des Pouliches and the Prix de Diane. She won nine out of her ten races before being retired after sustaining a tendon injury following her only defeat (4th place) in the Group 1 Prix Jacques Le Marois. Her consistent performances at the highest level led to her being voted the Cartier Three-Year-Old European Champion Filly in 2005, following on from another such high accolade, when in 2004 she was awarded the Cartier's best 2-year-old award.

In 2006 Divine Proportions was mated to Champion Sire Giant's Causeway and produced a bay colt. The colt was named Eightfold Path and won the Prix Eclipse in 2009. In 2007, she was mated to A.P. Indy

== Breeding record ==
2007 Eightfold Path (USA) : Bay colt, foaled 1 February, by Giant's Causeway (USA) - won 4 races, including G3 Prix Eclipse at Chantilly; LR Grand Handicap de Deauville, and placed 3 times, including 3rd G3 Prix La Rochette at Longchamp, from 13 starts in France 2009–2012

2010 Daivika (USA) : Bay filly, foaled 14 April, by Dynaformer (USA) - no wins in 2 starts.

2011 Monoceros (USA) : Bay colt, foaled 26 April, by Giant's Causeway (USA) - won 1 minor race from 6 starts.

2014 Diodorus (IRE) : Bay colt, foaled 9 May, by Galileo (IRE) - won 1 minor from 22 starts on the flat and all-weather, was sent hurdling for one season won 1 novice hurdle from 9 starts.

2016 Nefertiti (IRE) : Bay filly, foaled 12 February, by Galileo (IRE) - unraced.

2017 Numen (IRE) : Chestnut colt, foaled 7 March, by Galileo (IRE) - 1 minor win from 4 starts.

2018 Light Of My Eyes (IRE) : Bay filly, foaled 24 May, by Frankel (GB) - no wins from 2 minor races.

Pedigree of Divine Proportions
Sire Kingmambo	Mr. Prospector	Raise a Native	Native Dancer
Sire Kingmambo	Mr. Prospector	Raise a Native	Raise You
Sire Kingmambo	Mr. Prospector	Gold Digger	Nashua
Sire Kingmambo	Mr. Prospector	Gold Digger	Sequence
Sire Kingmambo	Miesque	Nureyev	Northern Dancer
Sire Kingmambo	Miesque	Nureyev	Special
Sire Kingmambo	Miesque	Pasodoble	Prove Out
Sire Kingmambo	Miesque	Pasodoble	Santa Quilla
Dam Myth to Reality	Sadler's Wells	Northern Dancer	Nearctic
Dam Myth to Reality	Sadler's Wells	Northern Dancer	Natalma
Dam Myth to Reality	Sadler's Wells	Fairy Bridge	Bold Reason
Dam Myth to Reality	Sadler's Wells	Fairy Bridge	Special
Dam Myth to Reality	Millieme	Mill Reef	Never Bend
Dam Myth to Reality	Millieme	Mill Reef	Milan Mill
Dam Myth to Reality	Millieme	Hardiemma	Hardicanute
Dam Myth to Reality	Millieme	Hardiemma	Grand Cross

== See also ==
- List of leading Thoroughbred racehorses
