= Lashkari (horse) =

British-bred Thoroughbred racehorse

- Sire: Mill Reef
- Grandsire: Never Bend
- Dam: Larannda
- Damsire: Right Royal
- Sex: Stallion
- Foaled: 1981
- Country: Great Britain
- Colour: Dark Bay/Brown
- Breeder: Aga Khan IV
- Owner: Aga Khan IV
- Trainer: Alain de Royer-Dupré
- Record: 13: 5-2-2
- Earnings: US$1,127,658 (equivalent)

Major wins
- Prix du Conseil de Paris (1984) Breeders' Cup wins: Breeders' Cup Turf (1984)
- Last updated on 2 August 2008

Lashkari (3 April 1981 – 25 December 1996) is a British-bred Thoroughbred racehorse, best known for winning the inaugural running of the Breeders' Cup Turf in 1984.

Named for Lashkari in Helmand Province, Afghanistan, he was bred and raced by Aga Khan IV. Lashkari was out of the French mare Larannda – a daughter of Right Royal, who was a multiple Group One winner in England and France. Lashkari was sired by Mill Reef, whose Group One wins included The Derby and Prix de l'Arc de Triomphe and who was voted 1971's European Horse of the Year.

A late bloomer who first went to the track at age three, under French trainer Alain de Royer-Dupré Lashkari won four of his eight starts in 1984. His first major win came in the Prix du Conseil de Paris at Longchamp Racecourse in Paris; this earned him the chance to compete in the first edition of the Breeders' Cup races at Hollywood Park Racetrack in Inglewood, California. Entered in the 1½ mile Breeders' Cup Turf, under jockey Yves Saint-Martin Lashkari caught the world champion filly All Along in the homestretch to win by a neck. Of the other nine horses in the race, Lashkari defeated Strawberry Road (who finished fourth) and the 1982 Kentucky Derby winner Gato Del Sol (who finished eighth).

At age four in 1985, Lashkari won once in five starts and finished second in the Group 2 Grand Prix de Deauville. In the autumn he returned to the United States to defend his Breeders' Cup Turf title, but finished fourth to Pebbles. Retired to stand at his owner's stud, Lashkari met with some success; he sired Erdelistan, the 1990 winner of the G-1 Gran Premio del Jockey Club. He is also the damsire of 2000 Epsom Derby and Prix de l'Arc de Triomphe winner, Sinndar.
