= Hurricane Run =

Irish-bred Thoroughbred racehorse (2002–2016)

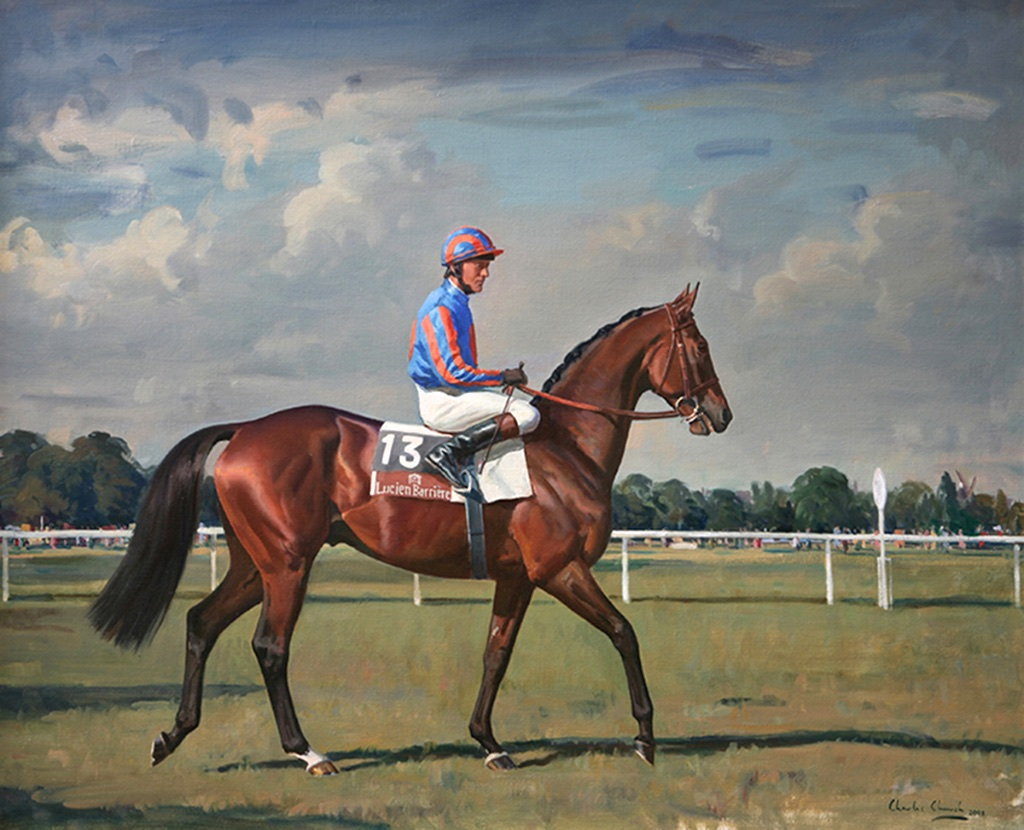
- Hurricane Run with Kieren Fallon: Painting by Charles Church
- Sire: Montjeu
- Grandsire: Sadler's Wells
- Dam: Hold On
- Damsire: Surumu
- Sex: Stallion
- Foaled: 13 April 2002
- Died: 14 December 2016 (aged 14)
- Country: Ireland
- Colour: Bay
- Breeder: Gestüt Ammerland
- Owner: Michael Tabor
- Racing colours: →
- Trainer: André Fabre
- Record: 14: 8-3-2
- Earnings: £2,447,602

Major wins
- Prix Hocquart (2005); Irish Derby (2005); Prix Niel (2005); Prix de l'Arc de Triomphe (2005); Tattersalls Gold Cup (2006); K. George VI & Q. Elizabeth Stakes (2006)

Awards
- European Three-Year-Old Champion Colt (2005); European Horse of the Year (2005); 1st in World Thoroughbred Rankings (2005); Timeform rating: 134
- Last updated on 15 October 2026

Hurricane Run (2002–2016) was a champion Irish-bred thoroughbred racehorse. He was the second French-trained horse, after his sire Montjeu, to win both the Prix de l'Arc de Triomphe and the King George VI and Queen Elizabeth Stakes. The colt was trained by André Fabre in France and ridden in all but one of his races by Christophe Soumillon or Kieren Fallon.

== Background ==
Hurricane Run was bred by German breeders Gestüt Ammerland. The colt was a son of champion Montjeu out of a German-bred dam, Hold On. He was owned by his breeders until bought by Michael Tabor in June 2005.

== Racing career ==
=== 2004: Two-year-old season ===
Hurricane Run, ridden by Christophe Soumillon won on his only start as a two-year-old.

=== 2005: Three-year-old season ===
In 2005, Hurricane Run won two Group 1 and two Group 2 races. His victories included the Irish Derby at the Curragh and the Prix de l'Arc de Triomphe at the Longchamp in Paris, ridden on both occasions by Kieren Fallon. His two-length Arc win was rated the best performance of the year by the International Federation of Horseracing Authorities. He was scheduled to run at Belmont Park in New York in October in the 2005 Breeders' Cup Turf but was sidelined with a cough. Hurricane Run lost only one race that year, when a late charge from behind a wall of horses just failed to catch the winner in the Prix du Jockey Club over 10 furlongs.

Hurricane Run was voted the Cartier Racing Award for European Horse of the Year and was both the world's top-ranked horse and long-distance horse as decided by the World Thoroughbred Racehorse Rankings.

=== 2006: Four-year-old season ===
Hurricane Run's season began brightly but tailed off towards the end of the year. After winning the Tattersalls Gold Cup at the Curragh, he failed to win the Grand Prix de Saint-Cloud in June. Ridden by Christophe Soumillon, the colt returned to action on 29 July to win the King George VI and Queen Elizabeth Stakes at Ascot. He was unsuccessful in the Prix de l'Arc de Triomphe, the Champion Stakes and the Breeders' Cup Turf, his final race.

== Stud record ==
=== Notable progeny ===
Hurricane Run sired two individual Group One winners:

c = colt, f = filly, g = gelding

Foaled	Name	Sex	Major Wins
2010	Magic Hurricane	g	The Metropolitan
2011	Ectot	c	Critérium International, Joe Hirsch Turf Classic Stakes

Hurricane Run was retired for the 2007 breeding season to Coolmore Stud in Ireland. His 2012 stud fee was 12,500 Euros. Hurricane Run was euthanized after complications during an operation on 14 December 2016.

== Pedigree ==
Pedigree of Hurricane Run
Sire Montjeu	Sadler's Wells	Northern Dancer	Nearctic
Sire Montjeu	Sadler's Wells	Northern Dancer	Natalma
Sire Montjeu	Sadler's Wells	Fairy Bridge	Bold Reason
Sire Montjeu	Sadler's Wells	Fairy Bridge	Special
Sire Montjeu	Floripedes	Top Ville	High Top
Sire Montjeu	Floripedes	Top Ville	Sega Ville
Sire Montjeu	Floripedes	Toute Cy	Tennyson
Sire Montjeu	Floripedes	Toute Cy	Adele Toumignon
Dam Hold On	Surumu	Literat	Birkhan
Dam Hold On	Surumu	Literat	Lis
Dam Hold On	Surumu	Surama	Reliance
Dam Hold On	Surumu	Surama	Suncourt
Dam Hold On	Hone	Sharpen Up	Atan
Dam Hold On	Hone	Sharpen Up	Rocchetta
Dam Hold On	Hone	Lucy	Sheshoon
Dam Hold On	Hone	Lucy	Laverock
