= Tuesday (horse) =

Irish Thoroughbred racehorse

- Sire: Galileo
- Grandsire: Sadler's Wells
- Dam: Lillie Langtry
- Damsire: Danehill Dancer
- Sex: Filly
- Foaled: 3 June 2019
- Country: Ireland
- Colour: Bay
- Breeder: Coolmore Stud
- Owner: Derrick Smith, Mrs. John Magnier, Michael Tabor & Westerburg
- Trainer: Aidan O'Brien
- Record: 10: 3-3-1
- Earnings: £1,403,303

Major wins
- Epsom Oaks (2022); Breeders' Cup; Breeders' Cup Filly & Mare Turf (2022)
- Last updated on 13 December 2022

Tuesday (foaled 3 June 2019) is an Irish Thoroughbred racehorse. She finished second on her only run as a two-year-old and won a minor race on her three-year-old debut. She then emerged as a top-class performer, finishing third in the 1000 Guineas and second in the Irish 1000 Guineas before winning the Epsom Oaks and Breeders' Cup Filly & Mare Turf at Keeneland in the US.

== Background ==
Tuesday is a bay filly with a white star and snip bred in Ireland by the Coolmore Stud. The filly was sent into training with Aidan O'Brien at Ballydoyle and raced in the colours of the Coolmore partners Derrick Smith, Michael Tabor and Susan Magnier in association with Georg von Opel. She was a very late foal, being born on 3 June 2019.

She was from the sixteenth crop of foals sired by Galileo, who won the Derby, Irish Derby and King George VI and Queen Elizabeth Stakes in 2001. As a breeding stallion he has been a multiple champion sire of Great Britain and Ireland whose other progeny have included Cape Blanco, Frankel, Golden Lilac, Nathaniel, New Approach, Rip Van Winkle and Ruler of the World. Empress Josephine was the sixth foal produced by Lillie Langtry, a top-class racemare who won the Coronation Stakes and the Matron Stakes in 2010. As a broodmare she had previously produced Tuesday's full sisters Minding and Empress Josephine. Lillie Langtry was a fifth-generation descendant of Noble Lassie, the dam of Vaguely Noble.

== Racing career ==
=== 2021: two-year-old season ===
Tuesday began her track career in a seven furlong maiden race at the Curragh on 21 June when she was ridden by Ryan Moore and started at odds of 9/4 in a fourteen-runner field. Racing on soft ground she made steady progress in the second half of the race but failed by a short head to run down the Jessica Harrington-trained favourite Discoveries. Tuesday did not race again in 2022.

=== 2022: three-year-old season ===
On her first run as a three-year-old Tuesday was ridden by Moore when she started 2/5 favourite for a maiden at Naas Racecourse on 27 March and recorded her first success as she took the lead two furlongs out and won "comfortably" by one and three quarter lengths from Exine.

Tuesday was then moved up sharply in class when she was sent to England on 1 May and started the 4/1 second favourite for the Group 1 1000 Guineas over the Rowley Mile at Newmarket Racecourse. Ridden by Frankie Dettori, she tracked the leaders from the start, kept on well in the closing stages and took third place behind Cachet and Prosperous Voyage. After the race Aidan O'Brien said "Tuesday ran very well and we're delighted... Frankie was happy enough and the ground was quick but we know she will stay further and he was happy with the run. She has made great progress in the last couple of weeks and that is testament to her character." Three weeks after her run at Newmarket, Tuesday, with Moore in the saddle, went off the 11/4 favourite for the Irish 1000 Guineas at the Curragh. After racing prominently from the start she moved up to dispute the lead two furlongs out but proved no match for the Dermot Weld-trained Homeless Songs and was beaten five and a half lengths into second place, with third place going to her stablemate Concert Hall (winner of the Weld Park Stakes).

On 3 June Tuesday, with Moore in the saddle, was one of eleven fillies to contest the 244th running of the Oaks Stakes (sponsored by Cazoo) over one and a half miles at Epsom Racecourse. She started the 13/2 third choice in the betting behind Emily Upjohn (Musidora Stakes) and Nashwa (Fillies' Trial Stakes) while the other contenders included Concert Hall, With The Moonlight (Pretty Polly Stakes), Thoughts of June (Cheshire Oaks), Tranquil Lady (Blue Wind Stakes), Rogue Millennium (Lingfield Oaks Trial) and Kawida (Montrose Stakes). Tuesday was settled at the rear of the field before making good progress early in the straight and gaining the advantage two furlongs out. In the closing stages she faced a sustained challenge from Emily Upjohn but kept on well and prevailed by a short head, with the pair finishing more than three lengths clear of Nashwa in third. She gave her trainer a record-breaking 41st Classic win on the day of her actual third birthday. O'Brien commented "Ryan gave her a brilliant ride... We felt a mile and a half was always going to suit her but you can never be sure. She was a long way back but the next thing she was challenging. She's still a baby and was running in Classics before she was three. It goes to show what kind of a filly she is and she's maturing all the time. She's very special and has an unbelievable pedigree. What she did today was classy and it's possible there's still more to come from her."

Three weeks after her win at Epsom Tuesday was matched against male opposition in the Irish Derby over the same distance at the Curragh and started the 11/8 joint favouirute in an eight-runner field. She raced towards the rear before staying on steadily in the straight but never looked likely to win and came home fourth behind Westover.

On 5 November, Tuesday raced in the GI Breeders' Cup Filly & Mare Turf at Keeneland. Jockey Ryan Moore settled on the inside midfield after the start wasted no time allowing In Italian to set quick fractional times of :22.82 for the quarter-mile :46.38 for a half-mile and 1:10.31 for six furlongs. In Italian opened a 2 1/2-length lead in the stretch with Lady Speightspeare briefly providing a threat after she got through, Tuesday crept within striking distance in the far turn, then launching a five-wide drive and quickened once straightened for the drive and catching In Italian inside the sixteenth pole and kicking away to the finishing line. Tuesday set a new track record for the 1 3/16-mile distance of 1:51.88

== Pedigree ==
Pedigree of Tuesday (IRE), bay filly, 2019
Sire Galileo (IRE) 1998	Sadler's Wells (USA); 1981	Northern Dancer (CAN); 1961	Nearctic 1954
Sire Galileo (IRE) 1998	Sadler's Wells (USA); 1981	Northern Dancer (CAN); 1961	Natalma (USA) 1957
Sire Galileo (IRE) 1998	Sadler's Wells (USA); 1981	Fairy Bridge; 1975	Bold Reason 1968
Sire Galileo (IRE) 1998	Sadler's Wells (USA); 1981	Fairy Bridge; 1975	Special 1969
Sire Galileo (IRE) 1998	Urban Sea (USA); 1989	Miswaki; 1978	Mr. Prospector 1970
Sire Galileo (IRE) 1998	Urban Sea (USA); 1989	Miswaki; 1978	Hopespringseternal 1970
Sire Galileo (IRE) 1998	Urban Sea (USA); 1989	Allegretta (GB); 1978	Lombard (GER) 1967
Sire Galileo (IRE) 1998	Urban Sea (USA); 1989	Allegretta (GB); 1978	Anatevka (GER) 1969
Dam Lillie Langtry (IRE) 2007	Danehill Dancer (IRE); 1993	Danehill (USA); 1986	Danzig 1977
Dam Lillie Langtry (IRE) 2007	Danehill Dancer (IRE); 1993	Danehill (USA); 1986	Razyana 1981
Dam Lillie Langtry (IRE) 2007	Danehill Dancer (IRE); 1993	Mira Adonde (USA); 1986	Sharpen Up (GB) 1969
Dam Lillie Langtry (IRE) 2007	Danehill Dancer (IRE); 1993	Mira Adonde (USA); 1986	Lettre d'Amour 1979
Dam Lillie Langtry (IRE) 2007	Hoity Toity (GB); 2000	Darshaan; 1981	Shirley Heights 1975
Dam Lillie Langtry (IRE) 2007	Hoity Toity (GB); 2000	Darshaan; 1981	Delsy (FR) 1972
Dam Lillie Langtry (IRE) 2007	Hoity Toity (GB); 2000	Hiwayaati; 1989	Shadeed (USA) 1982
Dam Lillie Langtry (IRE) 2007	Hoity Toity (GB); 2000	Hiwayaati; 1989	Alathea 1975 (Family: 1-d)
