= Lillie Langtry (horse) =

Irish Thoroughbred racehorse

- Racing silks of Michael Tabor
- Sire: Danehill Dancer
- Grandsire: Danehill
- Dam: Hoity Toity
- Damsire: Darshaan
- Sex: Mare
- Foaled: 27 February 2007
- Country: Ireland
- Colour: Dark Bay or Brown
- Breeder: Kevin Lynch
- Owner: Michael Tabor, Derrick Smith & Susan Magnier
- Trainer: Aidan O'Brien
- Record: 11: 5-2-1
- Earnings: £888,802

Major wins
- Fillies' Sprint Stakes (2009); Debutante Stakes (2009); Tattersalls Timeform Fillies' 800 (2009); Coronation Stakes (2010); Matron Stakes (2010)

Lillie Langtry (foaled 27 February 2007) is an Irish Thoroughbred racehorse and broodmare. Bred at a small stud in County Cork she was sold as a yearling and raced for the Coolmore organisation. As a two-year-old, she was one of the best juvenile fillies in Ireland winning three of her seven races including the Fillies' Sprint Stakes, Debutante Stakes and Tattersalls Timeform Fillies' 800 as well as finishing third in both the Albany Stakes and the Moyglare Stud Stakes. She was injured when finishing unplaced in the Breeders' Cup Juvenile Fillies Turf. In 2010 she recorded her biggest wins when achieving Group One victories in the Coronation Stakes at Royal Ascot and the Matron Stakes at Leopardstown. She was retired at the end of the year with a record of five wins from eleven races and has become a successful broodmare, producing three Classic race-winning daughters.

== Background ==
Lillie Langtry is a dark bay or brown mare with a small white star and bred in Ireland by Kevin Lynch. Her dam, Hoity Toity, was an unraced daughter of the Prix du Jockey Club winner Darshaan. Hoity Toity was a fourth-generation descendant of Noble Lassie, the dam of Vaguely Noble. Hoity Toity was bought for 50,000 guineas by Lynch and became one of only two mares kept at Lynch's Ballinahown Stud near Fermoy in County Cork. Lillie Langtry was sired by Danehill Dancer, who won the Phoenix Stakes, National Stakes and Greenham Stakes before becoming a very successful breeding stallion. His other progeny have included Choisir, Mastercraftsman, Legatissimo and Dancing Rain.

As a foal, Lillie Langtry was consigned by the Castletown Stud to the Tattersalls sales in December 2007 and was bought for 70,000 guineas by the Ashtown House Stud. In October 2008, the yearling filly returned to Tatteralls and was sold for 230,000 guineas to the bloodstock agents McKeever St.Lawrence. She subsequently entered the ownership of the Coolmore Stud organisation and was sent into training with Aidan O'Brien at Ballydoyle. Like many Coolmore horses, the official details of her ownership changed from race to race: she was sometimes listed as being the property of Michael Tabor, whilst on other occasions she was described as being owned by a partnership of Tabor, Derrick Smith and Susan Magnier. She was ridden in all but one of her races by Johnny Murtagh.

== Racing career ==
=== 2009: two-year-old season ===
Lillie Langtry made her racecourse debut in six furlong maiden race at Naas Racecourse on 13 May 2009 in which she finished second to the Jim Bolger-trained Kitty Kiernan. Nineteen days later, Lillie Langtry met Kitty Kiernan again in the Group Three Fillies' Sprint Stakes over the same course and distance. After racing in fifth place, she took the lead a furlong from the finish and drew away in the closing stages to beat Kitty Kiernan "comfortably" by two and a half lengths. In June, LL was sent to England to contest the Albany Stakes and was made the 11/8 favourite. Ridden by Seamie Heffernan she finished second of the twenty-two runners behind the Ed Dunlop-trained Habaayib.

On 6 August, Lillie Langtry was moved up in class and distance for the Group Two Debutante Stakes over seven furlongs at Leopardstown Racecourse. Starting the 2/5 favourite, she was restrained by Murtagh at the rear of the field before accelerating in the last quarter mile. She took the lead inside the final furlong and won by one and three quarter lengths from her stablemate Devoted To You. After the race the filly was made ante-post for the 2010 1000 Guineas: Aidan O'Brien commented "she's one of those fillies that changes gear quickly. She has such speed that she has no problem over seven furlongs, and she'll have no problem over a mile." At the Curragh on 30 August, Lillie Langtry started the 8/11 favourite for the Group One Moyglare Stud Stakes, with her main opposition appearing to come from the Sweet Solera Stakes winner Long Lashes. After being held up in the early stages she made steady progress in the straight but never looked like winning and finished third behind Termagant and Famous.

Lillie Langtry was sent to England a second time in October to contest the Tattersalls Timeform Fillies' 800, a race for fillies sold at Tattersalls which carried a first prize of £433,360. Starting the 8/11 favourite against thirteen opponents, she took the lead inside the final furlong and won by two and a quarter lengths from Dubawi Heights. On her final appearance of the season, Lillie Langtry was sent to California and started favourite for the Breeders' Cup Juvenile Fillies Turf at Santa Anita Park. She reached sixth place in the straight but could make no further progress and finished eighth behind Tapitsfly. It was subsequently announced that the filly had suffered a fractured knee in the race and would face a lengthy lay-off after an operation to insert a pin into the damaged joint.

=== 2010: three-year-old season ===
Lillie Langtry did not appear as three-year-old until 23 May, when she contested the Irish 1000 Guineas the Curragh. She was the 11/1 sixth choice in the betting behind Music Show (Rockfel Stakes), Gile Na Greine (third in the 1000 Guineas), Lolly For Dolly (Athasi Stakes), Anna Salai (Prix de la Grotte) and Termagant. Lillie Langtry finished strongly but was not quite able to reach the lead and finished fifth in a blanket finish behind Bethrah, Anna Salai, Music Show and Remember When.

On 18 June Lillie Langtry was sent to England for a third time and was made the 7/2 favourite for the Group One Coronation Stakes at Royal Ascot. Music Show, Anna Salai, Famous, and Gile Na Greine were again among her rivals as well as Jacqueline Quest (disqualified "winner" of the 1000 Guineas), Lady of the Desert (Lowther Stakes), Sent From Heaven (Prestige Stakes), Evading Tempete (Premio Regina Elena) and Puff (Fred Darling Stakes). Murtagh settled Lillie Langtry in mid-division as Gile Na Greine set a steady pace before moving up to challenge the leader in the straight. Lillie Langtry took the lead a furlong out and won by one and quarter lengths from Gile Na Greine with Jacqueline Quest in third place. Following the filly's win O'Brien said "We always thought she was a very good filly last year... it is a credit to everybody for getting her back" before indicating that she would probably be moved up in distance. Murtagh commented "She was by far our best filly last year, and going to the Breeders' Cup, I was wondering how far we were going to win by. That didn't happen, but she came back well in our Guineas and her home work had been very good". Despite O'Brien's predictions, Lillie Langtry was kept to a mile for her next race. She matched against older fillies and mares and started the 9/4 favourite for the Group One Falmouth Stakes at Newmarket in July. After reaching second place in the last quarter mile she faded in the closing stages and finished fifth of the eight runners behind Music Show, who won by a neck from the five-year-old mare Spacious.

After an eight-week break, Lillie Langtry returned for the Group One Matron Stakes over one mile at Leopardstown on 4 September. She started at odds of 7/2 third favourite behind Music Show and Spacious, with the other runners being Bethrah, Gile Na Greine and Hen Night (winner of the listed Platinum Stakes at Cork Racecourse). After being restrained at the rear of the field by Murtagh in the early stages, she moved up into second place behind Spacious approaching the final turn. She made a sustained run in the straight, overtook Spacious in the final strides and won by a neck, with Music Show in a length and a quarter away in third. Following the filly's victory, O'Brien said "She's always been very classy and determined. She was just about ready to come back and got very strong during her break".

Although her trainer suggested that Lillie Langtry would be aimed at contests such as the Prix de l'Opéra, the filly was retired at the end of the season.

== Breeding record ==
Lillie Langtry was retired to become a broodmare for the Coolmore Stud. Her first foal, Kissed By Angels (foaled 9 February 2012), was a bay filly sired by Galileo. She won the Group 3 Derrinstown Stud 1,000 Guineas Trial in 2015. A full-sister, Minding, finished second on her debut in June 2015 and went on to win the Moyglare Stud Stakes, the Fillies' Mile, the 2016 1000 Guineas and Oaks. A third filly by Galileo was born in 2015 and another filly by Galileo, Empress Josephine, was foaled in 2018 and won the Irish 1,000 Guineas in 2021. Lillie Langtry's 2019 filly by Galileo, Tuesday, became her third Classic-winning daughter when taking the 2022 Epsom Oaks.

== Pedigree ==
Pedigree of Lillie Langtry (IRE), dark bay or brown mare, 2007
| Sire Danehill Dancer (IRE) 1993 | Danehill (USA); 1986 | Danzig | Northern Dancer |
| Sire Danehill Dancer (IRE) 1993 | Danehill (USA); 1986 | Danzig | Pas de Nom |
| Sire Danehill Dancer (IRE) 1993 | Danehill (USA); 1986 | Razyana | His Majesty |
| Sire Danehill Dancer (IRE) 1993 | Danehill (USA); 1986 | Razyana | Spring Adieu |
| Sire Danehill Dancer (IRE) 1993 | Mira Adonde (USA); 1986 | Sharpen Up | Atan |
| Sire Danehill Dancer (IRE) 1993 | Mira Adonde (USA); 1986 | Sharpen Up | Rocchetta |
| Sire Danehill Dancer (IRE) 1993 | Mira Adonde (USA); 1986 | Lettre D'Amour | Caro |
| Sire Danehill Dancer (IRE) 1993 | Mira Adonde (USA); 1986 | Lettre D'Amour | Lianga |
| Dam Hoity Toity (GB) 2000 | Darshaan (GB); 1981 | Shirley Heights | Mill Reef |
| Dam Hoity Toity (GB) 2000 | Darshaan (GB); 1981 | Shirley Heights | Hardiemma |
| Dam Hoity Toity (GB) 2000 | Darshaan (GB); 1981 | Delsy | Abdos |
| Dam Hoity Toity (GB) 2000 | Darshaan (GB); 1981 | Delsy | Kelty |
| Dam Hoity Toity (GB) 2000 | Hiwaayati (GB); 1989 | Shadeed | Nijinsky |
| Dam Hoity Toity (GB) 2000 | Hiwaayati (GB); 1989 | Shadeed | Continual |
| Dam Hoity Toity (GB) 2000 | Hiwaayati (GB); 1989 | Alathea | Lorenzaccio |
| Dam Hoity Toity (GB) 2000 | Hiwaayati (GB); 1989 | Alathea | Vive la Reine (Family 1-d) |
