= 2005 1000 Guineas =

192nd running of

192nd 1000 Guineas Stakes
- 1000 Guineas
- Location: Newmarket Racecourse
- Date: 1 May 2005
- Winning horse: Virginia Waters (USA)
- Jockey: Kieren Fallon
- Trainer: Aidan O'Brien (IRE)
- Owner: Susan Magnier & Michael Tabor

The 2005 1000 Guineas Stakes was a horse race held at Newmarket Racecourse on Sunday 1 May 2005. It was the 192nd running of the 1000 Guineas.

The winner was Susan Magnier and Michael Tabor's Virginia Waters, an American-bred bay filly trained by Aidan O'Brien at Ballydoyle in County Tipperary and ridden by Kieren Fallon. Virginia Waters's victory was the first in the race for her owner and trainer and the fourth for Fallon after Sleepytime (1997), Wince (1999) and Russian Rhythm (2003).

== The contenders ==
The race attracted a field of twenty runners, sixteen trained in the United Kingdom and four in Ireland: there were no challengers from continental Europe. The favourite was the Barry Hills-trained Maids Causeway who had won the Sweet Solera Stakes and Rockfel Stakes in 2004. The four Irish challengers were headed by the Ballydoyle runner Virginia Waters, the winner of the Leopardstown 1,000 Guineas Trial Stakes. The Godolphin stable were represented by Satin Kiss, who had won two minor races in England in 2004 before winning both the UAE 1000 Guineas and the UAE Oaks on dirt in Dubai in early 2005. The best of the British-trained runners appeared to be Karen's Caper and Cape Columbine, first and second in the Nell Gwyn Stakes, the Masaka Stakes winner Vista Bella and the undefeated, but relatively untested Shanghai Lily. Maids Causeway headed an open betting market at odds of 5/1 ahead of Karen's Caper and Shanghai Lily on 6/1, Satin Kiss (8/1) and Cape Columbine (10/1). Virginia Waters and Vista Bella came next on 12/1,

== The race ==
Satin Kiss took the lead shortly after the start and set the pace from the 40/1 outsider Fen Shui, with Maids Causeway, Karen's Caper, Cap Columbine all in contention. Karen's Caper moved into the lead just after half distance but was overtaken by Maids Causeway a quarter of a mile from the finish, at which point Virginia Waters and Vista Bella began to make progress from the back of the field. Virginia Waters gained the advantage a furlong from the finish, despite hanging to the right, and went clear of her rivals in the closing stages to win by two and a half lengths from Maids Causeway. Vista Bella was half a length away in third ahead of Karen's Caper and Cape Columbine. Satin Kiss faded to finish seventeenth whilst Shanghai Lily came home nineteenth of the twenty runners.

After the race, O'Brien said "Kieren gave her an unbelievable ride. He couldn't believe how much she had improved after she won at Leopardstown. It's great for all the lads, they've put in a lot of effort. You do your best every season – sometimes it works and sometimes it doesn't, but it's great when it does".

== Race details ==
- Sponsor: ultimatepoker.com
- First prize: £198,650
- Surface: Turf
- Going: Good to Firm
- Distance: 8 furlongs
- Number of runners: 20
- Winner's time: 1:36.52

== Full result ==
Pos.	Marg.	Horse (bred)	Jockey	Trainer (Country)	Odds
1		Virginia Waters (USA)	Kieren Fallon	Aidan O'Brien (IRE)	12/1
2	2½	Maids Causeway (IRE)	Michael Hills	Barry Hills (GB)	5/1 fav
3	½	Vista Bella (GB)	Philip Robinson	Michael Jarvis (GB)	12/1
4	¾	Karen's Caper (USA)	Jimmy Fortune	John Gosden (GB)	6/1
5	hd	Cape Columbine (GB)	Richard Quinn	David Elsworth (GB)	10/1
6	¾	Saoire (GB)	Jamie Spencer	Frances Crowley (IRE)	16/1
7	nk	Pictavia (IRE)	Kevin Manning	Jim Bolger (IRE)	20/1
8	½	Bahia Breeze (GB)	Chris Catlin	Rae Guest (GB)	100/1
9	2	Echelon (GB)	Mick Kinane	Michael Stoute (GB)	16/1
10	¾	Fen Shui (UAE)	Kerrin McEvoy	Saeed bin Suroor (GB)	40/1
11	2	Golden Legacy (IRE)	Paul Hanagan	Richard Fahey (GB)	50/1
12	½	Favourita (GB)	Darryll Holland	Clive Brittain (GB)	20/1
13	nk	Joint Aspiration (GB)	Ted Durcan	Mick Channon (GB)	50/1
14	½	Slip Dance (IRE)	Eddie Ahern	Eamon Tyrrell (IRE)	50/1
15	6	Simply Sunshine (IRE)	J. F. Egan	David Elsworth (GB)	25/1
16	3	Penkenna Princess (IRE)	Seb Sanders	Ralph Beckett (GB)	16/1
17	¾	Satin Kiss (USA)	Frankie Dettori	Saeed bin Suroor (GB)	8/1
18	shd	Love Thirty (GB)	Richard Hughes	Mick Channon (GB)	100/1
19	17	Shanghai Lily (IRE)	Johnny Murtagh	Michael Stoute (GB)	6/1
20	2½	Market Trend (GB)	Kevin Darley	Mark Johnston (GB)	100/1

- Abbreviations: nse = nose; nk = neck; shd = head; hd = head; dist = distance; UR = unseated rider; DSQ = disqualified; PU = pulled up

== Winner's details ==
Further details of the winner, Virginia Waters

- Foaled: 15 February 2002
- Country: United States
- Sire: Kingmambo; Dam: Legend Maker (Sadler's Wells)
- Owner: Susan Magnier & Michael Tabor
- Breeder: Barnett Enterprises
