= Empress Josephine (horse) =

Irish Thoroughbred racehorse

- Racing silks of Susan Magnier
- Sire: Galileo
- Grandsire: Sadler's Wells
- Dam: Lillie Langtry
- Damsire: Danehill Dancer
- Sex: Filly
- Foaled: 5 February 2018
- Country: Ireland
- Colour: Bay
- Breeder: Coolmore Stud
- Owner: Derrick Smith & Susan Magnier & Michael Tabor
- Trainer: Aidan O'Brien
- Record: 9: 2-1-0
- Earnings: £268,841

Major wins
- Irish 1000 Guineas (2021)

Empress Josephine (foaled 5 February 2018) is an Irish Thoroughbred racehorse. She did not race as a two-year-old in 2020, but in the Spring of the following year she won a maiden race on her debut and recorded an upset win in the Irish 1000 Guineas.

== Background ==
Empress Josephine is a bay filly with no white markings bred in Ireland by the Coolmore Stud. The filly was sent into training with Aidan O'Brien at Ballydoyle and raced in the colours of the Coolmore partners Derrick Smith, Michael Tabor and Susan Magnier.

She was from the fifteenth crop of foals sired by Galileo, who won the Derby, Irish Derby and King George VI and Queen Elizabeth Stakes in 2001. As a breeding stallion he has been a multiple champion sire of Great Britain and Ireland whose other progeny have included Cape Blanco, Frankel, Golden Lilac, Nathaniel, New Approach, Rip Van Winkle and Ruler of the World. Empress Josephine was the sixth foal produced by Lillie Langtry, a top-class racemare who won the Coronation Stakes and the Matron Stakes in 2010. As a broodmare she had previously produced Empress Josephine's full-sister Minding. Lillie Langtry was a fifth-generation descendant of Noble Lassie, the dam of Vaguely Noble.

== Racing career ==
=== 2021: three-year-old season ===
Empress Josephine did not race as a two-year-old and made her debut in a maiden race over one mile on soft ground at Naas Racecourse on 28 March 2021, in which she was ridden by Seamie Heffernan and started at odds of 3/1 in a nineteen-runner field. After tracking the leaders she took the lead just inside the final furlong and "kept on well" to win by one and a quarter lengths from New York Angel. Two weeks after her win at Naas the filly was dropped in distance to seven furlongs, but stepped up in class to contest the Group 3 Leopardstown 1,000 Guineas Trial Stakes in which she was again partnered by Heffernan. She started well and opened up a clear lead in the early running before tiring badly in the closing stages and coming home tenth of the fifteen runners behind Keeper of Time, beaten more than eight lengths by the winner. Wayne Lordan took the ride when Empress Josephine started the 9/4 third choice in the betting for the Listed Victor McCalmont Memorial Stakes over 9 1/2 furlongs at Gowran Park on 5 May, when she was matched against older fillies and mares. She was in contention from the start before into moving second place approaching the final furlong but was never able to threaten the front-running four-year-old Too Soon To Panic who won by 2 3/4 lengths.

At the Curragh Racecourse on 23 May, with Heffernan in the saddle Empress Josephine started at odds of 14/1 for the 99th running of the Irish 1000 Guineas over one mile on heavy ground. Pretty Gorgeous started favourite while the other twelve runners included Fev Rover (Prix du Calvados), Joan of Arc, also trained by Aidan O'Brien), Miss Amulet (Lowther Stakes) and No Speak Alexander. The filly raced towards the rear of the field as No Speak Alexander set the pace but began to make progress in the straight despite being "bumped" three furlongs out and moved into third place entering the final furlong. At this point she appeared to be under pressure and unlikely to make further progress as her stablemate Joan of Arc challenged No Speak Alexander for the lead. In the closing stages however, she began to stay on strongly and ran down the leaders to win by a short head and a length from Joan of Arc and No Speak Alexander. Aidan O'Brien commented "We thought she was lovely the first day. Then next time at Leopardstown all the leaders went too fast over seven. We then ran her over nine furlongs in Gowran. That was a lovely run, but we thought nine may have just caught her out. She's able to quicken and Seamus gave her a lovely ride. She's very classy. She might go for the Coronation Stakes."

As O'Brien had predicted, Empress Josephine made her next appearance in the Coronation Stakes over one mile on heavy ground at Royal Ascot on 18 June. Starting the 6/1 fourth choice in the betting she was in contention for most of the way before tiring in the closing stages and coming home eighth of the eleven runners behind Alcohol Free. In the Nassau Stakes over ten furlongs at Goodwood Racecourse on 29 July Empress Josephine was matched against older fillies and mares for the first time but after being in contention for most of the way she faded in the last quarter mile and finished last of the six runners behind Lady Bowthorpe.

On 11 September at Leopardstown Empress Josephine started a 33/1 outsider for the Group 1 Matron Stakes and finished fourth behind No Speak Alexander, Pearls Galore and Mother Earth. The filly was then sent to race in the United States and ran twice at Keeneland in October, ridden on both occasions by John R. Velazquez. In the Grade I First Lady Stakes on 9 October she finished well to take third place behind the five-year-old mares Blowout and Regal Glory, beaten a length by the winner. A week later she started favourite for the Grade II Queen Elizabeth II Challenge Cup Stakes but ran poorly and finished tailed off last of the nine runners.

== Pedigree ==
Pedigree of Empress Josephine (IRE), bay filly, 2018
Sire Galileo (IRE) 1998	Sadler's Wells (USA); 1981	Northern Dancer (CAN)	Nearctic
Sire Galileo (IRE) 1998	Sadler's Wells (USA); 1981	Northern Dancer (CAN)	Natalma (USA)
Sire Galileo (IRE) 1998	Sadler's Wells (USA); 1981	Fairy Bridge	Bold Reason
Sire Galileo (IRE) 1998	Sadler's Wells (USA); 1981	Fairy Bridge	Special
Sire Galileo (IRE) 1998	Urban Sea (USA) ch. 1989	Miswaki	Mr. Prospector
Sire Galileo (IRE) 1998	Urban Sea (USA) ch. 1989	Miswaki	Hopespringseternal
Sire Galileo (IRE) 1998	Urban Sea (USA) ch. 1989	Allegretta (GB)	Lombard (GER)
Sire Galileo (IRE) 1998	Urban Sea (USA) ch. 1989	Allegretta (GB)	Anatevka (GER)
Dam Lillie Langtry (IRE) 2007	Danehill Dancer (IRE); 1993	Danehill (USA)	Danzig
Dam Lillie Langtry (IRE) 2007	Danehill Dancer (IRE); 1993	Danehill (USA)	Razyana
Dam Lillie Langtry (IRE) 2007	Danehill Dancer (IRE); 1993	Mira Adonde (USA)	Sharpen Up (GB)
Dam Lillie Langtry (IRE) 2007	Danehill Dancer (IRE); 1993	Mira Adonde (USA)	Lettre d'Amour
Dam Lillie Langtry (IRE) 2007	Hoity Toity (GB); 2000	Darshaan	Shirley Heights
Dam Lillie Langtry (IRE) 2007	Hoity Toity (GB); 2000	Darshaan	Delsy (FR)
Dam Lillie Langtry (IRE) 2007	Hoity Toity (GB); 2000	Hiwayaati	Shadeed (USA)
Dam Lillie Langtry (IRE) 2007	Hoity Toity (GB); 2000	Hiwayaati	Alathea (Family: 1-d)
