= No Speak Alexander =

Irish Thoroughbred racehorse

- Sire: Shalaa
- Grandsire: Invincible Spirit
- Dam: Rapacity Alexander
- Damsire: Dandy Man
- Sex: Filly
- Foaled: 14 April 2018
- Country: Ireland
- Colour: Bay
- Breeder: Mountarmstrong Stud
- Owner: Charles, Noel & Paul O'Callaghan
- Trainer: Jessica Harrington
- Record: 10: 3-1-1
- Earnings: £340,608

Major wins
- Athasi Stakes (2021); Matron Stakes (2021)

No Speak Alexander (foaled 14 April 2018) is an Irish Thoroughbred racehorse. She showed some promise as a juvenile in 2020 when she won one minor race from five attempts. In the following year she developed into a high-class performer, winning the Athasi Stakes and running third in the Irish 1000 Guineas before recording her biggest success in the Matron Stakes.

== Background ==
No Speak Alexander is a bay filly with a small white star and white socks on her forelegs bred in Ireland by her owner Noel O'Callaghan's Mountarmstrong Stud. As a yearling in 2019 she was put up for auction at the Goffs Orby Sale but failed to reach her reserve price of €190,000. She was sent into training with Jessica Harrington at Moone, County Kildare.

She was from the first crop of foals sired by Shalaa, a sprinter who showed his best form as a two-year-old in 2015 when his wins included the Prix Morny and Middle Park Stakes. No Speak Alexander's dam Rapacity Alexander, a full sister to the Hong Kong Sprint winner Peniaphobia, showed good racing ability, winning two of her six starts including the Listed Prix La Fleche in France as a two-year-old. Rapacity Alexander was a female-line descendant of the influential British broodmare Point Duty.

== Racing career ==
=== 2020: two-year-old season ===
No Speak Alexander began her racing career in a maiden race over five and a half furlongs at Navan Racecourse on 10 June when she started at odds of 8/1 and came home seventh of the fourteen runners behind Frenetic, beaten six and three quarter lengths by the winner. on 7 July at Roscommon Racecourse the filly went off at odds of 13/2 in a maiden over 7 1/2 furlongs on heavy ground. Ridden, as on her debut, by Shane Foley she disputed the lead from the start, gained the advantage entering the last quarter mile and won "easily" by 6 1/2 lengths from the Aidan O'Brien-trained favourite Divinely.

On 22 August No Speak Alexander was sent to France and moved up in class for the Group 2 Prix du Calvados over 1400 metres at Deauville Racecourse in which she was ridden by Frankie Dettori and finished fourth behind Fev Rover. At Leopardstown Racecourse three weeks later she ran second to Monday in the Listed Ingabelle Stakes, beaten three quarters of a length by the winner. She ended her season in the Group 3 Weld Park Stakes over seven furlongs at the Curragh on 27 September. With Foley in the saddle she took the lead entering the final furlong but was overtaken in the closing stages and came home fourth behind Elysium.

=== 2021: three-year-old season ===
On 3 May No Speak Alexander began her second campaign in the Group 3 Athasi Stakes over seven furlongs on soft ground at the Curragh in which she started the 11/2 fourth choice in the betting behind Champers Elysees, Zaffy's Pride (winner of the Star Appeal Stakes and also trained by Harrington) and Queen's Speech. After tracking the leaders Queen's Speech and Zaffy's Pride, No Speak Alexander gained the advantage a furlong out and won by a length and a half from Zaffy's Pride despite hanging to the left in the closing stages. After the race Shane Foley said She was good, she's been working like that and I was keen to ride her over [Zaffy's Pride]. She's a filly that I thought might have run well in the French Guineas, but we didn't have her in it. She's probably entitled to come back for the Irish Guineas now after that. She likes that bit of juice in the ground."

In the Irish 1000 Guineas on heavy ground at the Curragh on 23 May No Speak Alexander started at odds of 13/2 in a fourteen-runner field. She led for most of the way before being overtaken in the last 100 yards and finished third behind Empress Josephine and Joan of Arc, beaten just over a length by the winner. After a two-month break, No Speak Alexander returned to the track in the Prix Rothschild over 1600 metres at Deauville on 3 August when she finished unplaced behind Mother Earth after being badly hampered 400 metres from the finish.

On 11 September at Leopardstown, No Speak Alexander, ridden as usual by Foley, started a 25/1 outsider for the Group 1 Matron Stakes over one mile on good ground. Mother Earth started favourite while the other eleven runners included Champers Elysees, Pretty Gorgeous, Shale, Empress Josephine, Pearls Galore (Brownstown Stakes), Dreamloper (Valiant Stakes), Acanella (Snow Fairy Stakes) and Epona Plays (Lanwades Stud Stakes). After tracking the leaders No Speak Alexander began to make progress in the straight, overhauled the front-running Shale a furlong out and prevailed by a neck from Pearls Galore. As she made her winning run she hung left, hampering Shale and Mother Earth, but after an inquiry by the racecourse stewards the result was allowed to stand. After the race Jessica Harrington said "It was her day in the sun today. Everything was right and she really came on from the last day. She got no run in France at all—she got knocked over a furlong down. We trained her for this day and we rode her the same way as we did in the Guineas—up at the sharp end. She's probably got a little bit stronger. She likes a bit of nice ground. This was the plan and we'll enjoy the day." Foley received a five-day suspension for careless riding for his performance in the race: Aidan O'Brien (the trainer of Shale and Mother Earth) later opined that the jockey should have been banned for a month.

No Speak Alexander made her final racecourse appearance in the Sun Chariot Stakes over one mile at Newmarket Racecourse on 2 October. She finished sixth of the twelve runners behind Saffron Beach after looking to be outpaced in the closing stages. Four days after the race it was announced that No Speak Alexander had been retired from racing to become a broodmare. Jessica Harrington said "She's been a smashing filly, really brilliant for everyone. Hopefully she'll be lucky as she heads off on her new career. The Matron Stakes was undoubtedly the highlight. She's been a great filly to train."

== Pedigree ==
Pedigree of No Speak Alexander (IRE), bay filly, 2018
Sire Shalaa (IRE) 2013	Invincible Spirit (IRE); 1997	Green Desert (USA)	Danzig
Sire Shalaa (IRE) 2013	Invincible Spirit (IRE); 1997	Green Desert (USA)	Foreign Courier
Sire Shalaa (IRE) 2013	Invincible Spirit (IRE); 1997	Rafha (GB)	Kris
Sire Shalaa (IRE) 2013	Invincible Spirit (IRE); 1997	Rafha (GB)	Eljazzi (IRE)
Sire Shalaa (IRE) 2013	Ghurra (USA); 2002	War Chant	Danzig
Sire Shalaa (IRE) 2013	Ghurra (USA); 2002	War Chant	Hollywood Wildcat
Sire Shalaa (IRE) 2013	Ghurra (USA); 2002	Futuh	Diesis (GB)
Sire Shalaa (IRE) 2013	Ghurra (USA); 2002	Futuh	Hardship
Dam Rapacity Alexander (IRE) 2014	Dandy Man (IRE); 2003	Mozart	Danehill (USA)
Dam Rapacity Alexander (IRE) 2014	Dandy Man (IRE); 2003	Mozart	Victoria Cross (USA)
Dam Rapacity Alexander (IRE) 2014	Dandy Man (IRE); 2003	Lady Alexander	Night Shift (USA)
Dam Rapacity Alexander (IRE) 2014	Dandy Man (IRE); 2003	Lady Alexander	Sandhurst Goddess
Dam Rapacity Alexander (IRE) 2014	Umlani (IRE); 1997	Great Commotion (USA)	Nureyev
Dam Rapacity Alexander (IRE) 2014	Umlani (IRE); 1997	Great Commotion (USA)	Alathea (GB)
Dam Rapacity Alexander (IRE) 2014	Umlani (IRE); 1997	Travel Magic	Henbit (USA)
Dam Rapacity Alexander (IRE) 2014	Umlani (IRE); 1997	Travel Magic	Quiet Harbour (IRE) (Family: 1-p)

- No Speak Alexander is inbred 4 × 4 to Danzig, meaning that this stallion appears twice in the fourth generation of her pedigree.
