= Saoire =

Welsh-bred Thoroughbred racehorse

- Sire: Pivotal
- Grandsire: Polar Falcon
- Dam: Polish Descent
- Damsire: Danehill
- Sex: Mare
- Foaled: 29 April 2002
- Country: United Kingdom
- Colour: Chestnut
- Breeder: Louise Parry
- Owner: Joseph Joyce
- Trainer: Frances Crowley
- Record: 9: 2-2-1
- Earnings: £210,598

Major wins
- Irish 1000 Guineas (2005)

Saoire (foaled 29 April 2002) is a Welsh-bred, Irish-trained Thoroughbred racehorse and broodmare best known for winning the Irish 1000 Guineas in 2005. After being sold cheaply as a foal she was eventually sent into training with Frances Crowley in Ireland. In four races as a two-year-old in 2004 she showed very promising form, winning a maiden race and finishing placed in both the Moyglare Stud Stakes and the C L Weld Park Stakes. In the following spring she finished sixth in the 1000 Guineas before recording her biggest victory in the Irish equivalent three weeks later. Her victory made her the first Irish Classic Race winner to be trained by a woman. She was well beaten in three subsequent races and was retired from racing at the end of the year.

== Background ==
Saoire (Irish for "holiday" or "freedom") is a chestnut mare bred in Wales by Louise Parry of the Pembrokeshire-base Pantycoed Stud. As a foal she was entered in the Tattersalls sale in November 2002 and was bought for 4,000 guineas by the bloodstock agent Larry Stratton. In September 2003 she returned to the sales ring at the Tattersalls Ireland sale and was sold to Martin Cullinane for €65,000. The filly subsequently entered the ownership of Joseph Joyce and was sent into training with Frances Crowley at Edenderry, County Offaly. Crowley, formerly a successful amateur jockey under National Hunt rules is married to the leading Irish jockey Pat Smullen and is the sister-in-law of the trainer Aidan O'Brien.

Her sire Pivotal was a top class sprinter who won the King's Stand Stakes and the Nunthorpe Stakes in 1996. He went on to become an “excellent” sire, getting the winners of more than a thousand races across a range of distances including Farhh, Sariska, Somnus, Kyllachy and Excellent Art. Saoire's dam Polish Descent was an unraced mare who produced several other winners including Awinnersgame who won a valuable sales race at Doncaster Racecourse in 2008. She was a descendant of What Joy, a half-sister to the dam of Mon Fils.

== Racing career ==
=== 2004: two-year-old season ===
Saoire made her racecourse debut in a maiden race over seven furlongs at Limerick Racecourse on 22 July in which she started at odds of 7/1 and finished second, beaten three quarters of a length by the favourite Showbiz. In a similar event at Leopardstown on 15 August she started the 11/2 second choice behind the Aidan O'Brien-trained Mona Lisa in an eighteen-runner field. Ridden by Fran Berry, she raced in mid-division early on, made steady progress in the straight and caught the favourite in the final strides to win by a short head. The filly was then stepped up sharply in class for the Group One Moyglare Stud Stakes at the Curragh and finished strongly to take third place behind Chelsea Rose and Pictavia. Saoire ended her season in the C L Weld Park Stakes at the Curragh on 2 October. Starting the 100/30 third favourite she stayed on in the closing stages to finish second to Jazz Princess with Virginia Waters in third.

=== 2005: three-year-old season ===
On her first appearance as a three-year-old Saoire was sent to England for the 1000 Guineas over the Rowley Mile at Newmarket Racecourse on 1 May in which she was ridden by Jamie Spencer and started at odds of 16/1. After being restrained by Spencer in the early stages she stayed on in the last quarter mile and finished sixth of the twenty runners behind Virginia Waters, Maids Causeway, Vista Bella, Karen's Caper and Cape Columbine. Crowley subsequently stated that the filly had become upset on the flight from Ireland.

Three weeks after her run at Newmarket Saoire was one of eighteen fillies to contest the Irish 1000 Guineas at the Curragh, with Mick Kinane taking the ride. Virginia Waters started favourite ahead of Maids Causeway and the British challenger Damson (Queen Mary Stakes, Phoenix Stakes) with Saoire the 10/1 fourth choice in the betting. The other runners included Jazz Princess, Mona Lisa, Titian Time (runner-up in the Prix Marcel Boussac) and Penkenna Princess (Fred Darling Stakes). The outsider Sanserif set the pace with Saoire settled just behind the leaders before moving into contention in the last quarter mile. Kinane sent Saoire to the front a furlong out and she held on in a "blanket finish" to win by a short head and half a length from Penkenna Princess and Luas Line with the first ten fillies home finishing within three lengths of the winner. Crowley became the first woman to officially train a winner of an Irish Classic: Toby Wellesley had trained the winner of the Irish 1000 Guineas in 1948 but did not receive credit as women were not allowed to hold training licenses at that time, and the license was instead held by her male assistant. After the race Kinane said "We were right up there from the start and she never dropped out of the first three or four. knew the others were coming to me but she picked up really well" while Crowley commented "I was watching from a little way down the track from the winning post and I thought we were second. It's fantastic to win a Classic. I made history a few years ago when I was the first woman to win the Irish amateur riders' title and it is great to do it again".

Saoire was moved up in distance and matched against older fillies and mares for the first time in the Pretty Polly Stakes over ten furlongs at the Curragh on 25 June but she made little impact and finished eighth of the ten runners behind the four-year-old Alexander Goldrun. Despite her poor run in the Pretty Polly she was stepped up in distance again for the Irish Oaks over one and a half miles at the same track on 17 July. After reaching fifth place approaching the final turn she could make no progress in the straight and finished sixth behind the French-trained Shawanda. On her final racecourse appearance Saoire contested the Matron Stakes at Leopardstown on 10 September. After racing in second place she appeared to be outpaced in the straight and finished fifth to Attraction.

== Breeding record ==
- Saoire's Gift, a chestnut filly, foaled in 2007, sired by Giant's Causeway
- Pink Diva, chestnut filly, 2008, by Giant's Causeway. Won one race.
- Requisition (renamed Wealthy Fortune), bay colt (later gelded), 2009, by Invincible Spirit. Won two races including the Loughbrown Stakes.
- Polar Desert, bay colt, 2010, by Invincible Spirit. Trained in Sweden.
- Sundara, bay colt (gelded), 2011, by Galileo. Won one race: exported to the Czech Republic.
- Tamarind Cove, bay colt (gelded), 2012 Galileo. Won one race.
- Benignus, chestnut colt, 2013, by Galileo. Unraced.
- Classic Code, bay filly, 2014, by Galileo

== Pedigree ==
Pedigree of Saoire (GB), chestnut mare, 2002
Sire Pivotal (GB) 1993	Polar Falcon (USA); 1987	Nureyev	Northern Dancer
Sire Pivotal (GB) 1993	Polar Falcon (USA); 1987	Nureyev	Special
Sire Pivotal (GB) 1993	Polar Falcon (USA); 1987	Marie d’Argonne	Jefferson
Sire Pivotal (GB) 1993	Polar Falcon (USA); 1987	Marie d’Argonne	Mohair
Sire Pivotal (GB) 1993	Fearless Revival (GB); 1987	Cozzene	Caro
Sire Pivotal (GB) 1993	Fearless Revival (GB); 1987	Cozzene	Ride The Trails
Sire Pivotal (GB) 1993	Fearless Revival (GB); 1987	Stufida	Bustino
Sire Pivotal (GB) 1993	Fearless Revival (GB); 1987	Stufida	Zerbinetta
Dam Polish Descent (IRE) 1993	Danehill (USA); 1986	Danzig	Northern Dancer
Dam Polish Descent (IRE) 1993	Danehill (USA); 1986	Danzig	Pas de Nom
Dam Polish Descent (IRE) 1993	Danehill (USA); 1986	Razyana	His Majesty
Dam Polish Descent (IRE) 1993	Danehill (USA); 1986	Razyana	Spring Adieu
Dam Polish Descent (IRE) 1993	Nolnocan (GB); 1976	Colum	Santa Claus
Dam Polish Descent (IRE) 1993	Nolnocan (GB); 1976	Colum	Mitigation
Dam Polish Descent (IRE) 1993	Nolnocan (GB); 1976	Cotoneaster	Never Say Die
Dam Polish Descent (IRE) 1993	Nolnocan (GB); 1976	Cotoneaster	What Joy (Family: 1-g)
