= Seventh Heaven (horse) =

Irish-bred Thoroughbred racehorse

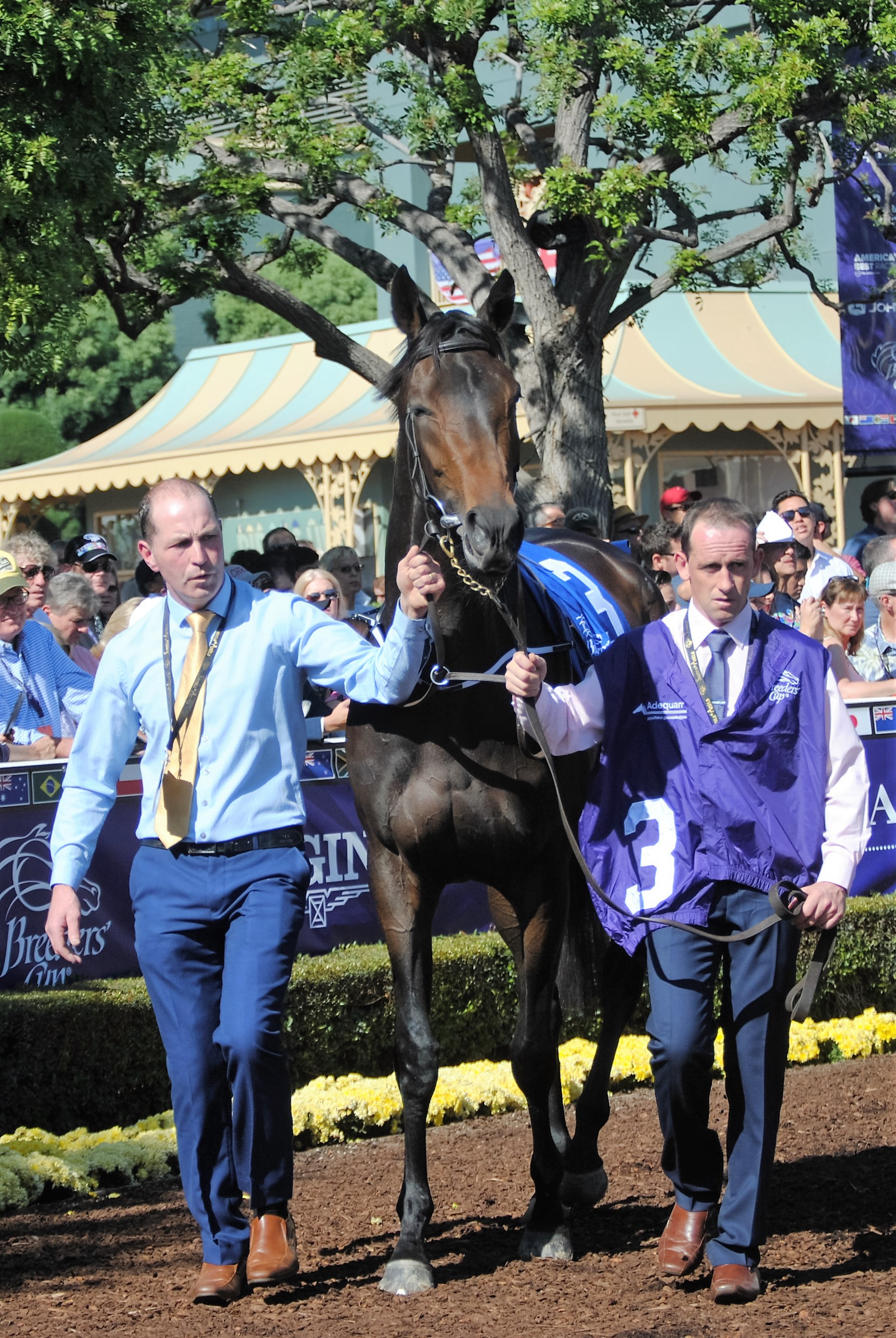
- Seventh Heaven preparing for the Filly & Mare Turf
- Sire: Galileo
- Grandsire: Sadler's Wells
- Dam: La Traviata
- Damsire: Johannesburg
- Sex: Mare
- Foaled: 29 March 2013
- Country: Ireland
- Colour: Bay
- Breeder: La Traviata Syndicate
- Owner: Derrick Smith, Susan Magnier & Michael Tabor
- Trainer: Aidan O'Brien
- Record: 11: 5-1-0
- Earnings: £1,526,006

Major wins
- Lingfield Oaks Trial (2016); Irish Oaks (2016); Yorkshire Oaks (2016); Jockey Club Stakes (2017)

Seventh Heaven (foaled 29 March 2013) is an Irish Thoroughbred racehorse. She showed little promise as a two-year-old and was well beaten in maiden races at Leopardstown and Newmarket. As a three-year-old she showed improved form as she was moved up in distance, winning a maiden at Dundalk and the Lingfield Oaks Trial at Lingfield. She ran poorly in The Oaks but then emerged as a top-class performer with wins over strong fields in the Irish Oaks and the Yorkshire Oaks.

== Background ==
Seventh Heaven is a bay filly with no white markings bred in Ireland by La Traviata Syndicate, a breeding organisation associated with the Coolmore Stud. The filly was sent into training with Aidan O'Brien at Ballydoyle. Like many Coolmore horses, the official details of her ownership have changed from race to race: she has sometimes been listed as being the property of Derrick Smith, whilst on other occasions she has been described as being owned by a partnership of Smith, Michael Tabor and Susan Magnier.

She was sired by Galileo (1998―2021), who won the Derby, Irish Derby and King George VI and Queen Elizabeth Stakes in 2001. Galileo went on to become one of the world's leading stallions and was champion sire of Great Britain and Ireland five times. His other progeny include Found, Cape Blanco, Frankel, Golden Lilac, Nathaniel, New Approach, Rip Van Winkle, Ruler of the World, and Minding. Seventh Heaven's dam La Traviata was bought as a two-year-old at the Fasig-Tipton Calder sale in February 2006 for $1.1 million by the bloodstock agent Dermot "Demi" O'Byrne on behalf of Coolmore. She showed good form in a brief racing career, winning three of her races in the United States in 2007 including the Grade III Victory Ride Stakes. She was descended from the American broodmare Miel, making her a distant relative of Rodrigo de Triano and Shaadi. As a broodmare La Traviata has also produced the Middle Park Stakes winner Crusade.

== Racing career ==
=== 2015: two-year-old season ===
Seventh Heaven began her racing career in a seven furlong maiden race at Leopardstown Racecourse on 12 September in which she finished seventh of the thirteen runners behind Anamba. Two weeks later she was sent to England for a similar event at Newmarket Racecourse and started the 5/2 second favourite. She never looked likely to win but stayed on in the closing stages to finish fourth behind First Victory.

=== 2016: three-year-old season ===
==== Spring ====
On her three-year-old debut Seventh Heaven contested a one-mile maiden on the Polytrack surface at Dundalk Racecourse on 18 April in which she was ridden by Seamie Heffernan. Starting the odds-on favourite in an eleven-runner field she took the lead approaching the final furlong and won by three and a quarter lengths from the Dermot Weld-trained Heartful.

The filly was then moved up in class and distance for the Listed Oaks Trial Stakes over eleven and a half furlongs at Lingfield Park 7 May. Ridden by Ryan Moore she started 15/8 favourite in a five runners field which included the highly regarded British-trained fillies Mountain Bell (a ten length winner of a maiden at Windsor) and Architecture. Seventh Heaven tracked the leader Mountain Bell before taking the lead in the last quarter mile and getting the better of what was described by the Racing Post as a "sustained duel" with Architecture to win by a neck. After the race Moore said "She didn't like the ground or the track and she's still won. She's a good filly and she'll have learned plenty".

==== Summer ====
The Epsom Oaks on 5 June saw Seventh Heaven start a 20/1 outsider in a field headed by her stablemate Minding. After tracking the leaders she dropped from contention in the straight and finished sixth of the eight finishers, thirty-three lengths behind Minding, who won from Architecture and Harlequeen.

On 16 July, Seventh Heaven (ridden by Heffernan) faced Architecture and Harlequeen again in the Irish Oaks at the Curragh and started a 14/1 outsider. The O'Brien stable fielded three other runners: the Ribblesdale Stakes winner Even Song, ridden by Moore, who started odds-on favourite, the Munster Oaks winner Pretty Perfect and the Cheshire Oaks winner Somehow. The best of the other five runners appeared to be Turret Rocks (May Hill Stakes) and Ajman Princess (runner-up in the Ribblesdale). Seventh Heaven raced at the rear of the field as Pretty Perfect made the running but began to make progress as the runners approached the final turn. She was switched to the left to make her challenge in the straight, recovered from a minor bump, and moved up to take the lead just inside the final furlong. She drew away in the final strides and won by two and three quarter lengths from Architecture, with Harlequeen a length and a quarter back in third. Aidan O'Brien, who was winning the race for the fifth time, nominated the Yorkshire Oaks as the filly's most likely next objective saying "She’ll love the flat track. She's a lovely, big, flowing Galileo filly".

Seventh Heaven was matched against older fillies and mares for the first time when she contested the Yorkshire Oaks at York Racecourse on 18 August. Ridden by Colm O'Donoghue she started the 100/30 second favourite behind her four-year-old stablemate Found who was returning from a two-month absence. Even Song, Harlequeen, Turret Rocks and Pretty Perfect were again in opposition, whilst the other runners included Queen's Trust (runner-up to Minding in the Nassau Stakes), Endless Time (Lancashire Oaks) and the multiple South American Grade I winner Furia Cruzada. As in her run at the Curragh, Seventh Heaven was held up at the rear of the field before making a forward move entering the straight. Pretty Perfect who had led for most of the way, was overtaken by Queen's Trust two furlongs out but Seventh Heaven gained the advantage a furlong out. Seventh Heaven stayed on strongly in the closing stages and won by two and three quarter lengths from Found, with Queen's Trust in third place. After the race O'Donoghue said "She's tough and genuine and has a great temperament and a beautiful action" whilst O'Brien commented "She's a beautiful traveler and is a massive, rangy filly that handles fast ground very well. I'd say she's going to make a real 4-year-old, because she's big and rangy."

==== Autumn ====
On 15 October Seventh Heaven, ridden by Moore, started 5/4 favourite for the British Champions Fillies & Mares Stakes over one and a half miles at Ascot Racecourse. Drawn on the far outside of the thirteen-runner field she tracked across to the rail soon after the start to race along the inside. After repeatedly struggling to obtain a clear run, she was switched to the outside in the straight but never looked likely to win and finished fifth behind Journey. In November she was sent to the United States for the Breeders' Cup Filly & Mare Turf over ten furlongs at Santa Anita Park. She started the 7/2 second favourite and stayed on in the straight to finish fourth behind Queen's Trust, Lady Eli and Avenge.

=== 2017: four-year-old season ===
For her four-year-old debut Seventh Heaven was sent to the United Arab Emirates to contest the Sheema Classic at Meydan Racecourse on 25 March. Ridden by Heffernan, she started lowly but stayed on strongly in the closing stages to finish second to Jack Hobbs with Postponed in third and Highland Reel last of the seven runners. On her return to Europe she was dropped from Group 1 class for the first time in a year and started odds-on favourite for the Group 2 Jockey Club Stakes at Newmarket Racecourse in which she was ridden by Moore. She took the lead approaching the final furlong and drew right away from her rivals to win by five lengths from the French horse One Foot in Heaven (winner of the Prix du Conseil de Paris).

== Pedigree ==
Pedigree of Seventh Heaven (IRE), bay filly, 2013
Sire Galileo (IRE) 1998	Sadler's Wells (USA); 1981	Northern Dancer	Nearctic
Sire Galileo (IRE) 1998	Sadler's Wells (USA); 1981	Northern Dancer	Natalma
Sire Galileo (IRE) 1998	Sadler's Wells (USA); 1981	Fairy Bridge	Bold Reason
Sire Galileo (IRE) 1998	Sadler's Wells (USA); 1981	Fairy Bridge	Special
Sire Galileo (IRE) 1998	Urban Sea (USA) ch. 1989	Miswaki	Mr. Prospector
Sire Galileo (IRE) 1998	Urban Sea (USA) ch. 1989	Miswaki	Hopespringseternal
Sire Galileo (IRE) 1998	Urban Sea (USA) ch. 1989	Allegretta	Lombard
Sire Galileo (IRE) 1998	Urban Sea (USA) ch. 1989	Allegretta	Anatevka
Dam La Traviata (USA) 2004	Johannesburg (USA); 1999	Hennessy	Storm Cat
Dam La Traviata (USA) 2004	Johannesburg (USA); 1999	Hennessy	Island Kitty
Dam La Traviata (USA) 2004	Johannesburg (USA); 1999	Myth	Ogygian
Dam La Traviata (USA) 2004	Johannesburg (USA); 1999	Myth	Yarn
Dam La Traviata (USA) 2004	Piedras Negras (USA); 1999	Unbridled	Fappiano
Dam La Traviata (USA) 2004	Piedras Negras (USA); 1999	Unbridled	Gana Facil
Dam La Traviata (USA) 2004	Piedras Negras (USA); 1999	Provisions	Devil's Bag
Dam La Traviata (USA) 2004	Piedras Negras (USA); 1999	Provisions	Atzimba (Family 20-a)
