= Maids Causeway =

Irish-bred Thoroughbred racehorse

- Sire: Giant's Causeway
- Grandsire: Storm Cat
- Dam: Valee des Reves
- Damsire: Kingmambo
- Sex: Mare
- Foaled: 11 March 2002
- Country: Ireland
- Colour: Chestnut
- Breeder: Vallee Des Reves Syndicate
- Owner: Lady Richard Wellesley; Martin S. Schwartz
- Trainer: Barry Hills
- Record: 11: 4-4-1
- Earnings: £350,996

Major wins
- Sweet Solera Stakes (2004); Rockfel Stakes (2004); Coronation Stakes (2005)

Maids Causeway (foaled 11 March 2002) is an Irish-bred, British-trained Thoroughbred racehorse and broodmare. As a two-year-old in 2004 she won three of her seven races including the Sweet Solera Stakes and Rockfel Stakes as well as being placed in both the May Hill Stakes and the Fillies' Mile. As a three-year-old she finished second in the classic 1000 Guineas and then recorded her biggest win in the Coronation Stakes. At the end of the year she was bought by Sheikh Mohammed and retired from racing to become a broodmare. Her name has always been rendered without an apostrophe, consistently with the street of that name alongside Midsummer Common in Cambridge.

== Background ==
Maids Causeway is a chestnut mare with a narrow white stripe bred in Ireland by the Vallee des Reves Syndicate. She was from the first crop of foals sired by Giant's Causeway who was voted Cartier Horse of the Year in 2000, a year in which he won the St James's Palace Stakes, Eclipse Stakes, Sussex Stakes, International Stakes, Irish Champion Stakes. He later became a very successful breeding stallion in the United States, siring major winners including Footstepsinthesand, Ghanaati, Shamardal and Rite of Passage. Her dam, Valee des Reves was an unraced daughter of Kingmambo. She was a granddaughter of Virunga who won the Prix de Malleret and was a half-sister to Vitiges.

As a yearling, Maids Causeway was offered for sale at Tattersalls but was bought back by her vendor when the bidding stopped at 25,000 guineas. The filly entered the ownership of Lady Richard Wellesley and was sent into training with Barry Hills at Lambourn in Berkshire. She was ridden in all but two of her races by her trainer's son Michael Hills.

== Racing career ==
=== 2004: two-year-old season ===
Maids Causeway began her racing career in a six furlong maiden race at Newbury Racecourse on 9 June in which she started a 16/1 outsider and finished second by a neck to her stable companion Whazzat. Two weeks later she recorded her first success in a similar event at Kempton Park Racecourse, taking the lead a furlong out and winning by two and a half lengths from the John Gosden-trained Park Law. In July she was stepped up in class for the Listed Star Stakes at Sandown Park Racecourse in which she was ridden by Kieren Fallon and finished second, beaten a head by Queen of Poland. On 7 August, the filly started at odds of 5/1 in the Group Three Sweet Solera Stakes over seven furlongs at Newmarket Racecourse. Windscreamer, trained by Barry Hills' son John started favourite, whilst the other runners included Valentin (runner-up in the Princess Margaret Stakes) and Extreme Beauty (third in the Cherry Hinton Stakes). Ridden by Steve Drowne, she tracked the leaders before taking the lead approaching the final furlong and winning by one and a quarter lengths from Slip Dance. After the race, the filly was bought privately by Martin S. Schwartz.

In September, Maids Causeway was moved up in class and distance for the Group Two May Hill Stakes over one mile at Doncaster Racecourse and finished third of the eight runners, beaten three quarters of a length and a short head by Playful Act and Queen of Poland. Two weeks later she contested the Group One Fillies' Mile at Ascot Racecourse in which she started third favourite behind Playful Act and the Michael Stoute-trained Echelon. On her seventh and final appearance of the season Maids Causeway started 3/1 favourite for the Group Two Rockfel Stakes over seven furlongs at Newmarket. Her opponents included the Godolphin filly Fen Shui, the Round Tower Stakes winner Cherokee and the Oh So Sharp Stakes winner Penkenna Princess. Maids Causeway tracked the leader Fen Shui before taking the lead two furlongs from the finish and then getting the better of a sustained struggle with Penkenna Princess to win by a short head, with the Clive Brittain-trained Favourita in third.

=== 2005: three-year-old season ===
On her first appearance as a three-year-old Maids Causeway was one of 20 fillies to contest the 192nd running of the 1000 Guineas over the Rowley Mile course at Newmarket on 1 May and was the 5/1 favourite. Penkenna Princess, Fen Shui, Slip Dance, Echelon and Favourita were in the field, but her main opposition appeared to come from the Nell Gwyn Stakes winner Karen's Caper and the previously unbeaten Shanghai Lily. Maids Causeway tracked the leaders before taking the lead two furlongs from the finish but was overtaken in the closing stages and beaten two and a half lengths into second place by Virginia Waters. Three weeks later, the filly was sent to Ireland to contest the Irish 1,000 Guineas at the Curragh and started second favourite behind Virginia Waters. She made steady progress in the closing stages but never looked likely to win and finished fifth of the 18 runners, behind Saoire.

The "Royal Ascot" meeting of 2005 was run at York as Ascot was closed for redevelopment. On 17 June Maids Causeway started the 9/2 second favourite for the Group One Coronation Stakes behind the Irish-trained filly Damson, winners of the Queen Mary Stakes and the Phoenix Stakes. Virginia Waters and Karen's Caper were also in the field along with the highly regarded maiden winner Discuss. Maids Causeway raced prominently from the start and took the lead at half way. She was overtaken by Karen's Caper in the final furlong but rallied to regain the lead in the last stride and won by a short head. Following her victory, Tony Morris, writing in the Racing Post described the filly as "a model of gameness and consistency".

After a break of more than three months, Maids Causeway returned at Newmarket in October in which she was matched against older fillies and mares in the Sun Chariot Stakes. She disputed the lead in the early stages but tired in the last quarter mile and finished seventh of the 10 runners behind the four-year-old Peeress.

In December Maids Causeway was scheduled to be auctioned at Tattersalls in December but was withdrawn from the sale after she was bought privately by Sheikh Mohammed.

== Breeding record ==
At the end of her racing career, Maids Causeway was retired to become a broodmare for Sheikh Mohammed's Darley Stud. To date (June 2015), she has produced three minor winners:

- Spirit Ditty, a filly, foaled in 2007, sired by Singspiel. Won one race.
- Jameel, bay colt (later gelded), 2008, by Monsun. Won one flat race and one hurdle race.
- Mountainside, chestnut colt (later gelded), 2012, by Dubawi. Won one hurdle race to date (June 2015).

== Pedigree ==
Pedigree of Maids Causeway (IRE), chestnut mare, 2002
Sire Giant's Causeway (USA) 1997	Storm Cat (USA); 1983	Storm Bird	Northern Dancer
Sire Giant's Causeway (USA) 1997	Storm Cat (USA); 1983	Storm Bird	South Ocean
Sire Giant's Causeway (USA) 1997	Storm Cat (USA); 1983	Terlingua	Secretariat
Sire Giant's Causeway (USA) 1997	Storm Cat (USA); 1983	Terlingua	Crimson Saint
Sire Giant's Causeway (USA) 1997	Mariah's Storm (USA); 1991	Rahy	Blushing Groom
Sire Giant's Causeway (USA) 1997	Mariah's Storm (USA); 1991	Rahy	Glorious Song
Sire Giant's Causeway (USA) 1997	Mariah's Storm (USA); 1991	Immense	Roberto
Sire Giant's Causeway (USA) 1997	Mariah's Storm (USA); 1991	Immense	Imsodear
Dam Valee des Reves (USA) 1996	Kingmambo (USA); 1990	Mr. Prospector	Raise a Native
Dam Valee des Reves (USA) 1996	Kingmambo (USA); 1990	Mr. Prospector	Gold Digger
Dam Valee des Reves (USA) 1996	Kingmambo (USA); 1990	Miesque	Nureyev
Dam Valee des Reves (USA) 1996	Kingmambo (USA); 1990	Miesque	Pasadoble
Dam Valee des Reves (USA) 1996	Venise (USA); 1985	Nureyev	Northern Dancer
Dam Valee des Reves (USA) 1996	Venise (USA); 1985	Nureyev	Special
Dam Valee des Reves (USA) 1996	Venise (USA); 1985	Virunga	Sodium
Dam Valee des Reves (USA) 1996	Venise (USA); 1985	Virunga	Vale (Family: 19-b)

- Maids Causeway was inbred 3 × 4 to Nureyev, meaning that this stallion appears in both the third and fourth generations of her pedigree. Maids Causeway was also inbred 4 × 4 to Northern Dancer.
