= Athasi Stakes =

Flat horse race in Ireland

- Class: Group 3
- Location: Curragh Racecourse; County Kildare, Ireland
- Race type: Flat / Thoroughbred
- Sponsor: Coolmore Stud
- Website: Curragh

Race information
- Distance: 7f (1,408 metres)
- Surface: Turf
- Track: Right-hand elbow
- Qualification: Three-years-old and up fillies and mares
- Weight: 8 st 11 lb (3yo); 9 st 9 lb (4yo+); Penalties; 5 lb for G1 / G2 winners * 3 lb for G3 winners * * since 1 June last year
- Purse: €67,500 (2024); 1st: €39,825

Athasi Stakes
2026
Kensington Lane	Black Caviar Gold	Drop Dead Gorgeous

Previous years
2025
Atsila	Cercene	Barnavara
2024
Gregarina	You Send Me	Doom
2023
Honey Girl	Agartha	Small Oasis
2022
Twilight Spinner	Cigamia	Lustown Baba
2021
No Speak Alexander	Zaffy's Pride	Soul Search

2020-2011
2020
With Thanks	Silk Forest	Soul Search
2019
Happen	Dan's Dream	Rionach
2018
Lightening Quick	Xenobia	Broadway
2017
Rehana	Rose De Pierre	Summer Icon
2016
Dolce Strega	Steip Amach	Ainippe
2015
Iveagh Gardens	Found	Avenue Gabriel
2014
Flying Jib	Peace Burg	Wannabe Better
2013
Viztoria	Bunairgead	Moonstone Magic
2012
Gossamer Seed	Bulbul	Ishvana
2011
Emiyna	Lolly For Dolly	Seeharn

2010-2001
2010
Lolly For Dolly	Famous	Duchess Of Foxland
2009
Emily Blake	Mad About You	Girouette
2008
Prima Luce	Emily Blake	She's Our Mark
2007
Eastern Appeal	Modeeroch	Deauville Vision
2006
Jazz Princess	Ardbrae Lady	Sandie
2005
Hazariya	Sky High Flyer	Airwave
2004
Lucky	Golden Nun	Megec Blis
2003
Walayef	Vintage Tipple	Bon Expresso
2002
Rum Charger	Kournakova	Marionnaud
2001
Cool Clarity	Rose Gypsy	Imagine

2000-1991
2000
Desert Magic	Yara	Berenica
1999
Taisho	Crystal Downs	Rahika Rose
1998
Kincara Palace	Heed My Warning	Alarme Belle
1997
Dangerous Diva	Azra	Chania
1996
Proud Titania	Zafzala	Asmara
1995
Ridgewood Pearl	One False Move	Bawader
1994
Zavaleta	Primo Stampari	Sophie's Pet
1993
Asema	Lavinia Fontana	Tarakana
1992
Market Booster	Americarr	Poolesta
1991
Inishdalla	Title Roll	Zafadola

1990-1988
1990
Wedding Bouquet	Shagudine	Blues Quartet
1989
Pirouette	Blasted Heath	Run To Jenny
1988
Certain Secret	Catina	Bell Tower

The Athasi Stakes is a Group 3 flat horse race in Ireland open to thoroughbred fillies and mares aged three years or older. It is run over a distance of 7 furlongs (1,408 metres) at the Curragh in early May.

== History ==
The event is named after Athasi, a successful broodmare in the 1920s and 1930s. Her progeny included Trigo, the winner of the Derby and St Leger in 1929.

The Athasi Stakes was formerly restricted to fillies aged three. Following a period with Group 3 status, it was downgraded to Listed level in 1987.

The race was opened to four-year-old fillies in 1993. It was opened to older mares in 2001. It regained Group 3 status in 2003.

== Records ==
Most successful horse:

- no horse has won this race more than once

Leading jockey since 1986 (5 wins):

- Michael Kinane – Certain Secret (1988), Inishdalla (1991), Market Booster (1992), Asema (1993), Hazariya (2005)

Leading trainer since 1986 (7 wins):

- Dermot Weld – Certain Secret (1988), Inishdalla (1991), Market Booster (1992), Asema (1993), Cool Clarity (2001), Rum Charger (2002), Flying Jib (2014)

== Winners since 1986 ==
Year	Winner	Age	Jockey	Trainer	Time
1986	Kemago	3	Pat Eddery	John Oxx	1:32.20
1987	Final Moment	3	Cash Asmussen	John Oxx	1:26.40
1988	Certain Secret	3	Michael Kinane	Dermot Weld	1:30.10
1989	Pirouette	3	Stephen Craine	Tommy Stack	1:33.00
1990	Wedding Bouquet	3	John Reid	Vincent O'Brien	1:25.10
1991	Inishdalla	3	Michael Kinane	Dermot Weld	1:29.30
1992	Market Booster	3	Michael Kinane	Dermot Weld	1:35.70
1993	Asema	3	Michael Kinane	Dermot Weld	1:36.80
1994	Zavaleta	3	Kevin Manning	Jim Bolger	1:42.20
1995	Ridgewood Pearl	3	Johnny Murtagh	John Oxx	1:27.50
1996	Proud Titania	3	Seamie Heffernan	Aidan O'Brien	1:27.50
1997	Dangerous Diva	3	Christy Roche	Aidan O'Brien	1:24.90
1998	Kincara Palace	3	Christy Roche	Aidan O'Brien	1:34.50
1999	Taisho	3	Willie Supple	Kevin Prendergast	1:35.80
2000	Desert Magic	4	Pat Shanahan	Con Collins	1:31.80
2001	Cool Clarity	3	Pat Smullen	Dermot Weld	1:26.40
2002	Rum Charger	3	Pat Smullen	Dermot Weld	1:31.60
2003	Walayef	3	Declan McDonogh	Kevin Prendergast	1:25.20
2004	Lucky	3	Seamie Heffernan	Aidan O'Brien	1:30.60
2005	Hazariya	3	Michael Kinane	John Oxx	1:36.80
2006	Jazz Princess	4	Johnny Murtagh	Michael Halford	1:27.70
2007	Eastern Appeal	4	Rory Cleary	Michael Halford	1:23.80
2008	Prima Luce	3	Kevin Manning	Jim Bolger	1:31.24
2009	Emily Blake	5	Johnny Murtagh	John Hayden	1:32.71
2010	Lolly for Dolly	3	Wayne Lordan	Tommy Stack	1:25.89
2011	Emiyna	3	Johnny Murtagh	John Oxx	1:25.64
2012	Gossamer Seed	4	Shane Foley	John Joseph Murphy	1:34.13
2013	Viztoria	3	Johnny Murtagh	Edward Lynam	1:30.53
2014	Flying Jib	3	Kevin Manning	Dermot Weld	1:26.47
2015	Iveagh Gardens	4	Niall McCullagh	Charles O'Brien	1:33.75
2016	Dolce Strega	3	Billy Lee	Willie McCreery	1:29.23
2017	Rehana (Note: The 2017 and 2018 races took place at Naas due to redevelopment work at The Curragh.)	3	Shane Foley	Michael Halford	1:25.20
2018	Lightening Quick	3	Colin Keane	Ger Lyons	1:27.68
2019	Happen	3	Ryan Moore	Aidan O'Brien	1:26.72
2020	With Thanks (Note: The 2020 race was run at Naas in November due to the COVID-19 pandemic in the Republic of Ireland)	3	Chris Hayes	William Haggas	1:36.71
2021	No Speak Alexander	3	Shane Foley	Jessica Harrington	1:27.61
2022	Twilight Spinner	4	Shane Crosse	Joseph O'Brien	1:29.25
2023	Honey Girl	4	Dylan Browne McMonagle	Joseph O'Brien	1:29.81
2024	Gregarina	5	Dylan Browne McMonagle	Joseph O'Brien	1:32.89
2025	Atsila	3	Gavin Ryan	Donnacha O'Brien	1:40.03
2026	Kensington Lane	3	Chris Hayes	Donnacha O'Brien	1:38.24

== Earlier winners ==
- 1952: Winged Foot
- 1953: Banri an Oir
- 1955: Dark Issue
- 1956: Atlantida
- 1957: After the Show
- 1960: Gilboa
- 1962: Lovely Gale
- 1963: Evening Shoe
- 1964: Royal Danseuse
- 1965: Arctic Melody
- 1966: Loyalty
- 1967: Jadeite
- 1968: Rimark
- 1969: Wenduyne
- 1970: Miralife
- 1971: Leit Motif
- 1972: Arkadina
- 1973: Daria
- 1974: Lisadell
- 1975: Miralla
- 1976: Serencia
- 1977: Orchestration
- 1978: Smelter
- 1979: Godetia
- 1980: Etoile de Paris
- 1981: Martinova
- 1982: Celestial Path
- 1983: Flame of Tara
- 1984: Reo Racine
- 1985: Quiet Thoughts

== See also ==
- Horse racing in Ireland
- List of Irish flat horse races
