= Homeless Songs (horse) =

Irish Thoroughbred racehorse

- Sire: Frankel
- Grandsire: Galileo
- Dam: Joailliere
- Damsire: Dubawi
- Sex: Mare
- Foaled: 24 February 2019
- Country: Ireland
- Colour: Bay
- Breeder: Moyglare Stud
- Owner: Moyglare Stud
- Trainer: Dermot Weld
- Record: 8: 3-1-0
- Earnings: £301,852

Major wins
- Leopardstown 1,000 Guineas Trial Stakes (2022); Irish 1,000 Guineas (2022)

Homeless Songs (foaled 24 February 2019) is an Irish Thoroughbred racehorse. After showing promise as a two-year-old in 2021 when she won one race from three attempts, she improved in the following spring to take the Leopardstown 1,000 Guineas Trial Stakes and the Irish 1,000 Guineas.

== Background ==
Homeless Songs is a bay mare with a small white star bred and owned by the Moyglare Stud. She was sent into training with Dermot Weld at the Curragh, County Kildare.

She was from the sixth crop of foals sired by Frankel, an undefeated racehorse whose other progeny have included Cracksman, Adayar, Soul Stirring and Hurricane Lane. Homeless Songs' dam Joailliere showed some racing ability, winning two races including a Listed event in Germany. She was descended from the Irish broodmare In Anticipation, making her a relative of the Irish St. Leger winner Royal Diamond.

== Racing career ==
=== 2020: two-year-old season ===
Homeless Songs began her track career in a maiden race over seven furlongs on good ground at Leopardstown Racecourse on 8 July when she was ridden by Oisin Orr and started at odds of 8/1 in a fifteen-runner field. After a slow start she settled in mid-division before finishing strongly, taking the lead inside the final furlong and winning by two lengths from Agartha. The filly was then moved up sharply in class for the Moyglare Stud Stakes (Ireland's only Group 1 race confined to two-year-old fillies) at the Curragh on 12 September. With Orr again in the saddle she came home fifth of the eight runners behind Discoveries, beaten just over four lengths by the winner after looking to be outpaced in the closing stages. Colin Keane took the ride when Homeless Songs was matched against male opponents in the Group 3 Killavullan Stakes at Leopardstown on 16 October. She started favourite but finished sixth of the eight runners behind the Aidan O'Brien-trained Glounthaune.

=== 2021: three-year-old season ===
On her first appearance as a three-year-old Homeless Songs was ridden by Chris Hayes when she contested the Leopardstown 1,000 Guineas Trial Stakes over seven furlongs on 2 April and went off the 6/1 third choice in the betting behind Sacred Bridge (winner of the Round Tower Stakes) and Contarelli Chapel in an eleven-runner field. After being settled in mid-division she made rapid progress approaching the final furlong, gained the advantage in the closing stages and won by a length from Agartha. Dermot Weld commented "We'll see how she comes out of the race and then decide where we go next... It was a very good renewal – the standard of the fillies in the race was very high and Chris said she just took a blow going to the line. She has a lot of pace. I thought she was very professional. Chris rode her for speed and you saw what pace she has – she settled it in three strides."

Homeless Songs bypassed the English 1000 Guineas, returning to the track on 22 May to contest the Irish 1,000 Guineas over one mile at the Curragh. With Hayes again in the saddle she went off the 11/2 second favourite behind Tuesday in a fourteen-runner field which also included History (Cornelscourt Stakes), Agartha, Concert Hall (Weld Park Stakes), Purplepay (third in the Critérium International), Mise En Scene (Prestige Stakes), Panama Red (Ingabelle Stakes) and Hermana Estrella (Fillies' Sprint Stakes). Agartha set the pace before giving way to Tuesday entering the last quarter mile but Homeless Songs, having raced towards the rear in the early stages, made rapid progress to gain the advantage a furlong from the finish. She accelerated away from her opponents in the closing stages to win by five and a half lengths from Tuesday in "impressive" style. After the race Hayes said "She's an amazing filly. I rode her in a bit of work last year and thought she was the nicest two-year-old I had ridden all year... She has an extraordinary turn of foot and the last thing I needed was to be looking for gaps, she enjoys having a bit of room and you saw what she can do. My only concern was getting a clean run of things." Weld, who was winning his 20th Irish Classic commented "I have won this race with a number of good fillies and she rates right up there... she relaxed beautifully for Chris and he gave her the most perfect ride.

== Pedigree ==
Pedigree of Homeless Songs (IRE), bay filly, 2019
Sire Frankel (GB) 2008	Galileo (IRE); 1998	Sadler's Wells (USA)	Northern Dancer (CAN)
Sire Frankel (GB) 2008	Galileo (IRE); 1998	Sadler's Wells (USA)	Fairy Bridge
Sire Frankel (GB) 2008	Galileo (IRE); 1998	Urban Sea (USA)	Miswaki
Sire Frankel (GB) 2008	Galileo (IRE); 1998	Urban Sea (USA)	Allegretta (GB)
Sire Frankel (GB) 2008	Kind (IRE); 2001	Danehill (USA)	Danzig
Sire Frankel (GB) 2008	Kind (IRE); 2001	Danehill (USA)	Razyana
Sire Frankel (GB) 2008	Kind (IRE); 2001	Rainbow Lake (GB)	Rainbow Quest (USA)
Sire Frankel (GB) 2008	Kind (IRE); 2001	Rainbow Lake (GB)	Rockfest (USA)
Dam Joailliere (IRE) 2012	Dubawi (IRE); 2002	Dubai Millennium (GB)	Seeking The Gold (USA)
Dam Joailliere (IRE) 2012	Dubawi (IRE); 2002	Dubai Millennium (GB)	Colorado Dancer (IRE)
Dam Joailliere (IRE) 2012	Dubawi (IRE); 2002	Zomaradah (GB)	Deploy
Dam Joailliere (IRE) 2012	Dubawi (IRE); 2002	Zomaradah (GB)	Jawaher (IRE)
Dam Joailliere (IRE) 2012	Majestic Silver (IRE); 2006	Linamix (FR)	Mendez
Dam Joailliere (IRE) 2012	Majestic Silver (IRE); 2006	Linamix (FR)	Lunadix
Dam Joailliere (IRE) 2012	Majestic Silver (IRE); 2006	Diamond Trim	Highest Honor (FR)
Dam Joailliere (IRE) 2012	Majestic Silver (IRE); 2006	Diamond Trim	In Anticipation (Family: 1-l)
