= Sheila Lavery =

Irish racehorse trainer

Personal information
- Born: circa 1960
- Occupation: Trainer

Horse racing career
- Sport: Horse racing

Significant horses
- Lady Kaya, New Energy, Moracana

Sheila Lavery (born c. 1960) is an Irish Group race winning trainer based at Summerhill, County Meath.

Lavery has a background in eventing and also breeding horses, but did not take out a trainer's licence until 2012, when she was 52, starting with just four horses. Robbie Colgan, who switched from riding over jumps to riding on the flat, is first jockey for the yard. Lavery's first winner was Lady Ultra ridden by Rory Cleary at the Curragh on 15 September 2013. Her first winner in a Group race was Lady Kaya, ridden by Colgan, in the Group 3 Leopardstown 1,000 Guineas Trial Stakes on 6 April 2019. Lady Kaya, who had been bought for €15,000 as a foal by Lavery's niece Joanne, then came second in the 1000 Guineas at Newmarket and was due to run at the Royal Ascot meeting when she sustained a fatal injury while exercising.

In June 2023 Lavery lost her stable star New Energy when he was sold to Australian syndicate operator Australian Bloodstock. New Energy, who was owned by Lavery's brother John, had been runner-up in the 2022 Irish 2,000 Guineas. When Australian Bloodstock director Luke Murrell was promoting New Energy to potential buyers, he made disparaging remarks about Lavery and suggested as a selling point that the horse would improve after leaving her yard. The remarks produced an outcry from the racing community and Murrell was forced to apologize. Lavery said she was "absolutely humbled and amazed" by the support she had received.
