= Miralla =

Irish-bred Thoroughbred racehorse

- Sire: Allangrange
- Grandsire: Le Levanstell
- Dam: Miralife
- Damsire: Miralgo
- Sex: Mare
- Foaled: 1972
- Country: Ireland
- Colour: Chestnut
- Breeder: Frank Flannery
- Owner: Lady Lister-Kaye
- Trainer: Hugh Nugent
- Record: 12: 3-0-3

Major wins
- Athasi Stakes (1975); Irish 1000 Guineas (1975)

Awards
- Timeform rating 120 (1975)

Miralla (1972 – after 1990) was an Irish thoroughbred racehorse and broodmare. She showed moderate form as a two-year-old in 1974 but mage great improvement in the following spring when she won the Athasi Stakes and then recorded a five-length success in the Irish 1000 Guineas. She was unsuited by the firm ground which prevailed for the rest of the year and never won again. After her retirement from racing she became a broodmare and was based in the United States before returning to Ireland in 1986. She produced a few minor winners but no high-class performers. Her last recorded foal was born in 1990.

== Background ==
Miralla was a "lightly-built" chestnut mare bred in Ireland by Frank Flannery. During her racing career she was owned by Lady Lister-Kaye and was trained by Sir Hugh Nugent at Lohunda Park in Clonsilla.

She was from the first crop of foals sired by the 1970 Irish St Leger winner Allangrange, a stallion who stood for only four seasons in Europe before being exported to Japan. Her dam Miralife, whose first foal she was, showed high-class form on the track, finishing third in the Irish 1000 Guineas and was a half-sister to Dickens Hill.

== Racing career ==
=== 1974: two-year-old season ===
As a two-year-old in 1974 Miralla raced four times over six and seven furlongs but failed to win although she finished third on two occasions. She did not perform well enough to be given a weight in the Irish Free Handicap.

=== 1975: three-year-old season ===
On her three-year-old debut, Miralla was ridden by an apprentice jockey and started an outsider for a minor race over seven furlongs at Phoenix Park Racecourse but belied her odds by taking the lead in the last quarter mile and winning by four lengths from Passer Queen. She was then moved up in class for the Athasi Stakes over the same distance at the Curragh and started at odds of 12/1 in a field headed by the Paddy Prendergast-trained Tender Camilla who had won the Marble Hill Stakes, Railway Stakes and Moyglare Stud Stakes in 1974. In a race run on extremely heavy ground in driving rain Miralla went clear of her rivals approaching the final furlong and held off the late run of Tender Camilla to win by a short head. The Irish 1000 Guineas at the Curragh attracted a field of eleven fillies and saw Nocturnal Spree start favourite ahead of Silky, Music Ville, Highest Trump (Queen Mary Stakes) and Reap the Wind (National Stakes) with Miralla next in the betting on 14/1 alongside Swingtime. Ridden by Ryan "Buster" Parnell, Miralla tracked the leaders as Music Ville set the pace before moving up into contention in the last quarter mile. She took the lead a furlong out and drew right away in the closing stages to win by five lengths from Silky with another five lengths back to Highest Trump in third.

The weather became much warmer and drier in the summer of 1975 and Miralla was unsuited by the resulting firmer ground. In June she was sent to England for the Coronation Stakes at Royal Ascot but looked extremely ill at ease on the ground and finished sixth to Rose Bowl. On 19 July she was moved up in distance for the Irish Oaks over one and a half miles at the Curragh and came home fifth of the fourteen runners behind Juliette Marny. After finishing fifth in her next two starts she was sent to France for the Prix de l'Opéra over 1850 metres at Longchamp Racecourse in October. She was racing on soft ground for the first time since the spring was required to concede weight to her sixteen opponents and finished ninth behind Sea Sands, beaten six lengths by the winner.

== Assessment ==
In 1975, the independent Timeform organisation gave Miralla a rating of 120, making her 13 pounds inferior to their top-rated three year-old filly Rose Bowl.

== Breeding record ==
At the end of her racing career Miralla was exported to become a broodmare in the United States where she produced seven foals:

- Parisio, a bay colt, foaled in 1979, sired by Sham. Won two races.
- Case For Gossip, chestnut colt, 1980, by Lyphard. Won one race.
- Great Poet, chestnut colt, 1982, by Irish River. Failed to win in nine races.
- Whenever Wherever, chestnut filly, 1983, by Secretariat. Unraced.
- Operating Cost, chestnut filly, 1984, by Northjet. Unraced.
- Allow For Change, chestnut colt (later gelded), 1985, by Super Concorde. Failed to win in two races.
- Overseas Wealth, chestnut filly, 1986, by Forli

In November 1986 Miralla was put up for auction at Keeneland where she was bought for $50,000 by the bloodstock agency BBA (Ireland). She was returned to her native Ireland where she produced four more foals.

- Golden Concorde, brown filly, 1987, by Super Concorde. Unraced.
- Minami, filly, 1988, by Caerleon
- Mysuma, chestnut filly, 1989, by Ahonoora. Won one race.
- My Safety, chestnut colt, 1990, by Tate Gallery

== Pedigree ==
Pedigree of Miralla, chestnut mare, 1972
Sire Allangrange (IRE) 1967	Le Levanstell (IRE); 1957	Le Lavandou	Djebel
Sire Allangrange (IRE) 1967	Le Levanstell (IRE); 1957	Le Lavandou	Lavande
Sire Allangrange (IRE) 1967	Le Levanstell (IRE); 1957	Stella's Sister	Ballyogan
Sire Allangrange (IRE) 1967	Le Levanstell (IRE); 1957	Stella's Sister	My Aid
Sire Allangrange (IRE) 1967	Silken Princess (GB); 1956	Arctic Prince	Prince Chevalier
Sire Allangrange (IRE) 1967	Silken Princess (GB); 1956	Arctic Prince	Arctic Sun
Sire Allangrange (IRE) 1967	Silken Princess (GB); 1956	Silken Slipper	Bois Roussel
Sire Allangrange (IRE) 1967	Silken Princess (GB); 1956	Silken Slipper	Carpet Slipper
Dam Miralife (GB) 1967	Miralgo (GB); 1959	Aureole	Hyperion
Dam Miralife (GB) 1967	Miralgo (GB); 1959	Aureole	Angelola
Dam Miralife (GB) 1967	Miralgo (GB); 1959	Nella	Nearco
Dam Miralife (GB) 1967	Miralgo (GB); 1959	Nella	Laitron
Dam Miralife (GB) 1967	London Life (GB); 1961	Panaslippper	Solar Slipper
Dam Miralife (GB) 1967	London Life (GB); 1961	Panaslippper	Panastrid
Dam Miralife (GB) 1967	London Life (GB); 1961	Court Circular	Court Martial
Dam Miralife (GB) 1967	London Life (GB); 1961	Court Circular	Queanladdie (Family: 11-e)
