= Virginia Waters =

American-bred Thoroughbred racehorse

- Sire: Kingmambo
- Grandsire: Mr. Prospector
- Dam: Legend Maker
- Damsire: Sadler's Wells
- Sex: Mare
- Foaled: 15 February 2002
- Country: United States
- Colour: Bay
- Breeder: Barnett Enterprises
- Owner: Susan Magnier & Michael Tabor
- Trainer: Aidan O'Brien
- Record: 12: 3-1-2
- Earnings: £311,746

Major wins
- Leopardstown 1,000 Guineas Trial Stakes (2005); 1000 Guineas (2005)

Virginia Waters (foaled 15 February 2002) is an American-bred, Irish-trained Thoroughbred racehorse. In a racing career which lasted from September 2004 to October 2005 she ran twelve times and won three races. After winning once from four starts as a two-year-old, she won the Group Three Leopardstown 1,000 Guineas Trial Stakes on her first appearance of 2005. She then recorded her most important success when winning the Classic 1000 Guineas two of her six races including an upset win in the Group Two Rockfel Stakes at Newmarket Racecourse. Virginia Waters failed to win her remaining six races, her best results coming when she finished fourth in The Oaks and second in the Matron Stakes. At the end of her three-year-old season she was retired from racing to become a broodmare.

== Background ==
Virginia Waters, a bay horse with a broad white blaze and three white socks, was bred in Kentucky by Barnett Enterprises, a breeding company associated with the Coolmore Stud. Her dam Legend Maker, won the Group Three Prix de Royaumont for Michael Tabor in 1997. Apart from Virginia Waters, her foals include Alexander of Hales a colt who won the Gallinule Stakes and finished second in the Irish Derby. As a descendant of the broodmare Sunbittern, Virginia Waters was also related to The Derby winner High-Rise and the Breeders' Cup Turf winner In The Wings. Virginia Waters' sire, Kingmambo was a highly successful breeding stallion. His progeny included the British Classic winners Russian Rhythm, Light Shift, King's Best, Henrythenavigator and Rule of Law as well as major winners in Japan (El Condor Pasa), France (Divine Proportions) and the United States (Lemon Drop Kid).

Like many Coolmore horses, the details of Virginia Waters' ownership altered from race to race. For some of her races she was owned by Susan Magnier, while in others she was officially owned in partnership by Susan Magnier and Michael Tabor. She was trained throughout her career by Aidan O'Brien at Ballydoyle.

== Racing career ==
Virginia Waters debut in September 2004 was unusual, in that she bypassed maiden races and was sent straight into Group race competition. Ridden by Seamie Heffernan she started at 14/1 and finished eighth of the eleven runners in the Round Tower Stakes at the Curragh. Two weeks later, she recorded her first win when she easily beat nine opponents in the Loder EBF Fillies Stakes at the same course. In October she finished third to Jazz Princess in the Group Three Meld Stakes and second to Bibury Fyler in a Listed race.

On her first appearance as a three-year-old, Virginia Waters started 5/2 second favourite for the Leopardstown 1000 Guineas Trial on 10 April. Ridden by Kieren Fallon, who had recently taken over the job as first jockey for Coolmore, she showed improved form to take the lead inside the final furlong and won by three lengths. Three weeks later, Virginia Waters was one of twenty fillies who contested the 1000 Guineas, a race in which she ran over a mile for the first time and raced on firm ground for the first time since her debut. The betting for the race was unusually open, with the Barry Hills-trained Maids Causeway starting favourite on 5/1 and Virginia Waters being made the 12/1 sixth choice. Fallon restrained the filly in the early stages before moving forward in the last quarter mile. Virginia Waters took the lead a furlong from the finish and won by two and a half lengths from Maid's Causeway. The win completed a rare double for Coolmore, O'Brien, and Fallon who had won the 2000 Guineas with Footstepsinthesand a day earlier. No owner-trainer-jockey combination had achieved the double since King George VI, Fred Darling and Gordon Richards won the races with Big Game and Sun Chariot in 1942.

Virginia Waters' subsequent form was disappointing. Three weeks after her win at Newmarket she started 11/10 favourite for the Irish 1,000 Guineas but finished unplaced behind Saoire on soft ground. When it became clear that the ground at Epsom was likely to be firm, the filly's owners paid a supplementary entry of £20,000 to run her in the Oaks. She was made joint-favourite for the race but after moving into third place in the straight she weakened in the closing stages to finish fourth behind Eswarah. Later that month she finished unplaced behind Maids Causeway in the Coronation Stakes at "Royal Ascot" (run that year at York) when Fallon rejected her in favour of Magnier's other runner, Damson. In July she was unplaced in the Nassau Stakes at Goodwood behind Alexander Goldrun.

In September at Leopardstown, Virginia Waters produced her best performance since her classic success when she finished a close third behind the English challengers Attraction and Chic in the Group One Matron Stakes. On her final racecourse appearance, Virginia Waters finished last of the ten runners, beaten forty-seven lengths by the winner Peeress in the Sun Chariot Stakes on soft ground at Newmarket.

== Stud record ==
Virginia Waters retired to become part of the Coolmores Stud's breeding operation. She has been sent to leading stallions including Storm Cat and Danehill Dancer, but the only winner from her first five foals has been the colt Emperor Claudius, by Giant's Causeway, winner of a Listed race at the Curragh in 2010.

2007 Emperor Claudius (USA): Bay colt, foaled 11 January, by Giant's Causeway (USA) – won 4 races including LR Celebration S, Curragh, placed twice including 2nd LR Chesham S, Royal Ascot from 8 starts in Ireland and England during 2009–10

2008 Ballroom (IRE) : Bay filly, foaled 12 January, by Storm Cat (USA) – placed three times from 7 starts in Ireland 2011

2009 Visalia (IRE) : Bay filly, foaled 31 March, by Dansili (GB) – unplaced only start in France 2012

2010 Where (IRE): Bay filly, foaled 28 March, by Danehill Dancer (IRE) – placed third once from 4 starts in Ireland during 2012

2011 Dove Mountain (IRE): Bay colt (gelded), foaled 1 April, by Danehill Dancer (IRE) – won 3 races and placed 6 times from 36 starts in Ireland and England; won 2 races and placed 3 times over hurdles in Ireland, to date (5/07/17)

2013 Lizard Point (IRE) : Bay colt, foaled 1 January, by Fastnet Rock (AUS) – unplaced only start to date in Ireland 2015

== Pedigree ==
Pedigree of Virginia Waters (USA), bay mare, 2002
Sire Kingmambo (USA) 1990	Mr. Prospector; 1970	Raise a Native	Native Dancer
Sire Kingmambo (USA) 1990	Mr. Prospector; 1970	Raise a Native	Raise You
Sire Kingmambo (USA) 1990	Mr. Prospector; 1970	Gold Digger	Nashua
Sire Kingmambo (USA) 1990	Mr. Prospector; 1970	Gold Digger	Sequence
Sire Kingmambo (USA) 1990	Miesque; 1984	Nureyev	Northern Dancer
Sire Kingmambo (USA) 1990	Miesque; 1984	Nureyev	Special
Sire Kingmambo (USA) 1990	Miesque; 1984	Pasadoble	Prove Out
Sire Kingmambo (USA) 1990	Miesque; 1984	Pasadoble	Santa Quilla
Dam Legend Maker (IRE) 1994	Sadler's Wells; 1981	Northern Dancer	Nearctic
Dam Legend Maker (IRE) 1994	Sadler's Wells; 1981	Northern Dancer	Natalma
Dam Legend Maker (IRE) 1994	Sadler's Wells; 1981	Flaming Page	Bold Reason
Dam Legend Maker (IRE) 1994	Sadler's Wells; 1981	Flaming Page	Special
Dam Legend Maker (IRE) 1994	High Spirited; 1987	Shirley Heights	Mill Reef
Dam Legend Maker (IRE) 1994	High Spirited; 1987	Shirley Heights	Hardiemma
Dam Legend Maker (IRE) 1994	High Spirited; 1987	Sunbittern	Sea Hawk
Dam Legend Maker (IRE) 1994	High Spirited; 1987	Sunbittern	Pantoufle (Family: 9-e)

- Virginia Waters was inbred 3x4 to Northern Dancer, meaning that this stallion appears in both the third and the fourth generations of her pedigree. She is also inbred 4x4 to the broodmare Special.
