= Crusade (horse) =

American-bred Thoroughbred racehorse

- Sire: Mr Greeley
- Grandsire: Gone West
- Dam: La Traviata
- Damsire: Johannesburg
- Sex: Stallion
- Foaled: 11 March 2009
- Country: United States
- Colour: Bay or brown
- Breeder: La Traviata Syndicate
- Owner: Michael Tabor, Susan Magnier & Derrick Smith
- Trainer: Aidan O'Brien
- Record: 6: 2-0-0
- Earnings: £104,655

Major wins
- Middle Park Stakes (2011)

Crusade (foaled 11 March 2009) is an American-bred, Irish-trained Thoroughbred racehorse and sire best known for his upset win in the 2011 Middle Park Stakes. He showed his best form as a juvenile when he won one minor race from his first three starts before taking the Middle Park at odds of 25/1. On his only subsequent start that year, he finished sixth on dirt in the Breeders' Cup Juvenile. He ran poorly on his only appearance as a three-year-old and was retired to become a breeding stallion in South Africa.

== Background ==
Crusade is a dark bay or brown horse with no white markings bred in Kentucky by La Traviata Syndicate, a breeding organisation associated with the Coolmore Stud in Ireland. The colt was sent into training with Aidan O'Brien at Ballydoyle. Like many Coolmore horses, the official details of his ownership changed from race to race: he was sometimes listed as being the property of Michael Tabor, whilst on other occasions he was described as being owned by a partnership of Tabor, Derrick Smith and Susan Magnier.

Crusade was sired by Mr Greeley, whose five wins included the Swale Stakes and the Lafayette Stakes and who also finished second in the Breeders' Cup Sprint. As a breeding stallion, Mr Greeley is best known as the sire of the outstanding Irish-trained filly Finsceal Beo and the Sussex Stakes winner Reel Buddy. Crusade's dam La Traviata was bought as a two-year-old at the Fasig-Tipton Calder sale in February 2006 for $1.1 million by the bloodstock agent Dermot "Demi" O'Byrne on behalf of Coolmore. She showed good form in a brief racing career, winning three of her races in the United States in 2007 including the Grade III Victory Ride Stakes. She was descended from the American broodmare Miel, making her a distant relative of Rodrigo de Triano and Shaadi. As a broodmare La Traviata went on to produce the multiple Group One winner Seventh Heaven.

== Racing career ==
=== 2011: two-year-old season ===
Crusade was ridden in his first three starts by Colm O'Donoghue. For his racecourse debut the colt was sent to England for a maiden races over seven furlongs at York Racecourse on 19 August. Starting as a 33/1 outsider he made some progress in the second half of the race but then faded inside the final furlong and finished eighth of the seventeen runners, more than eleven lengths behind the winner Rugged Cross. Nine days later the colt started 5/2 favourite against fifteen opponents in a maiden over six furlongs at the Curragh. Crusade went to the front at half-way, broke away from his rivals a furlong out and won by two lengths from the filly Pearl In The Sand.

On 22 September Crusade was sent back in England and stepped up in class for the Group Three Somerville Tattersall Stakes at Newmarket Racecourse and started the 5/1 second choice in the betting behind the Roger Varian-trained Farraaj. He took second place approaching the final furlong but looked to be outpaced in the closing stages and finished fourth behind Crius, Farraaj and Zip Top. Despite his defeat Crusade was moved up again in class when he returned to Newmarket for the Group One Middle Park Stakes on 8 October in which he was ridden by Seamie Heffernan. He started a 25/1 outsider in a sixteen-runner field headed by the joint-favourites Caspar Netscher (Gimcrack Stakes) and Family One (Prix Robert Papin), whilst the other thirteen runners included Bapak Chinta (Norfolk Stakes, Lilbourne Lad (Railway Stakes), Saigon (Rose Bowl Stakes) and Crusade's more fancied stablemate Reply who had won a valuable sales race at Doncaster. After tracking the leaders, Crusade made a forward move a quarter mile from the finish, overtook Reply just inside the final furlong and stayed on to win by three quarters of a length. Lilbourne Lad got the best of a five-way blanket finish for second place ahead of Reply, Balty Boys, Caspar Netscher and Saigon. After the race Heffernan commented "He has improved from run to run. It's grand. When it comes together it is great. He is taking his race well, he has plenty of scope and plenty of speed."

On his final run of the year, Crusade joined his more highly regarded stablemate Daddy Long Legs for a trip to the United States to contest the Breeders' Cup Juvenile on the dirt track at Churchill Downs on 5 November. Partnered by the American jockey Julien Leparoux he started slowly and never looked likely to win, but made steady progress in the last quarter mile to finish sixth of the thirteen runners behind Hansen, Union Rags, Creative Cause, Dullahan and Take Charge Indy.

=== 2012: three-year-old season ===
Crusade was entered in the Irish 2000 Guineas but did not run in the races, instead making his first appearance of the year in the Greenlands Stakes over six furlongs at the Curragh on 26 May in which he was matched against older horses. Ridden by his trainer's son Joseph O'Brien he began to struggle in the last quarter mile and dropped away to finish last of the eleven runners behind the six-year-old gelding Tiddliwinks.

== Assessment ==
In the 2011 European Thoroughbred Rankings, Crusade was given a rating of 113, making him the fifteenth-best juvenile colt of the year, six pounds behind the top-rated Camelot.

== Stud record ==
At the end of 2012 Crusade was sold to the Kwa-Zulu Natal Breeders Club and exported to become a breeding stallion at the Highdown Stud in South Africa. A representative of the buyers described Crusade as "a handsome horse, well-balanced and athletic. He has a good head, a good eye and a lovely disposition - very nice natured and easy to work with. He is a correct, athletic walker with a very good speed pedigree".

== Pedigree ==
Pedigree of Crusade (USA), bay or brown stallion, 2009
| Sire Mr Greeley (USA) 1992 | Gone West (USA); 1984 | Mr Prospector | Raise A Native |
| Sire Mr Greeley (USA) 1992 | Gone West (USA); 1984 | Mr Prospector | Gold Digger |
| Sire Mr Greeley (USA) 1992 | Gone West (USA); 1984 | Secrettame | Secretariat |
| Sire Mr Greeley (USA) 1992 | Gone West (USA); 1984 | Secrettame | Tamerett |
| Sire Mr Greeley (USA) 1992 | Long Legend (USA); 1978 | Reviewer | Bold Ruler |
| Sire Mr Greeley (USA) 1992 | Long Legend (USA); 1978 | Reviewer | Broadway |
| Sire Mr Greeley (USA) 1992 | Long Legend (USA); 1978 | Lianga | Dancer's Image |
| Sire Mr Greeley (USA) 1992 | Long Legend (USA); 1978 | Lianga | Leven Ones |
| Dam La Traviata (USA) 2004 | Johannesburg (USA); 1999 | Hennessy | Storm Cat |
| Dam La Traviata (USA) 2004 | Johannesburg (USA); 1999 | Hennessy | Island Kitty |
| Dam La Traviata (USA) 2004 | Johannesburg (USA); 1999 | Myth | Ogygian |
| Dam La Traviata (USA) 2004 | Johannesburg (USA); 1999 | Myth | Yarn |
| Dam La Traviata (USA) 2004 | Piedras Negras (USA); 1999 | Unbridled | Fappiano |
| Dam La Traviata (USA) 2004 | Piedras Negras (USA); 1999 | Unbridled | Gana Facil |
| Dam La Traviata (USA) 2004 | Piedras Negras (USA); 1999 | Provisions | Devil's Bag |
| Dam La Traviata (USA) 2004 | Piedras Negras (USA); 1999 | Provisions | Atzimba (Family: 20-a) |
