= Minding (horse) =

Irish Thoroughbred racehorse

- Racing silks of Derrick Smith
- Sire: Galileo
- Grandsire: Sadler's Wells
- Dam: Lillie Langtry
- Damsire: Danehill Dancer
- Sex: Mare
- Foaled: 10 February 2013
- Country: Ireland
- Colour: Bay
- Breeder: Orpendale, Chelston & Wynatt
- Owner: Derrick Smith & Mrs John Magnier & Michael Tabor
- Trainer: Aidan O'Brien
- Record: 13: 9-3-1
- Earnings: £2,344,930

Major wins
- Moyglare Stud Stakes (2015); Fillies' Mile (2015); 1000 Guineas (2016); Epsom Oaks (2016); Pretty Polly Stakes (2016); Nassau Stakes (2016); Queen Elizabeth II Stakes (2016); Mooresbridge Stakes (2017)

Awards
- Cartier Champion Two-year-old Filly (2015); Top-rated European two-year-old filly (2015); Cartier Champion Three-year-old Filly (2016); Cartier Horse of the Year (2016); Irish Horse of the Year (2016); World top-rated three-year-old filly (2016)

Minding (foaled 10 February 2013) is a champion Irish Thoroughbred racehorse who was the 2016 European Horse of the Year after winning the Epsom Oaks, 1000 Guineas, and Queen Elizabeth II Stakes.

She was among the leading two-year-old fillies of her generation in Europe in 2015 when she won three of her five races including the Moyglare Stud Stakes in Ireland and the Fillies' Mile in England. On her first appearance of 2016 the filly posted a decisive victory in the classic 1000 Guineas but was subsequently beaten when favourite for the Irish 1,000 Guineas. She went on to win a second classic in The Oaks in June, the first filly to complete the Guineas-Oaks double since Kazzia in 2002. She went on to take her fifth and sixth Group One races with wins in the Pretty Polly Stakes and the Nassau Stakes. She then defeated male opposition to take the Queen Elizabeth II Stakes. At the end of the year she was named Cartier Horse of the Year and the world's best three-year-old filly. She won on her reappearance in 2017 but subsequently suffered an injury which led to her retirement later that year without racing again.

== Background ==
Minding is a bay mare with a white blaze and four white socks bred in Ireland by Orpendale, Chelston & Wynatt, a breeding company associated with the Coolmore Stud. She was sired by Galileo, who won the Derby, Irish Derby and King George VI and Queen Elizabeth Stakes in 2001. Galileo is now one of the world's leading stallions and has been champion sire of Great Britain and Ireland five times. His other progeny include Cape Blanco, Frankel, Golden Lilac, Nathaniel, New Approach, Rip Van Winkle and Ruler of the World. She was the second foal produced by Lillie Langtry, a top-class racemare who won the Coronation Stakes and the Matron Stakes in 2010. She was a fifth-generation descendant of Noble Lassie, the dam of Vaguely Noble.

The filly was sent into training with Aidan O'Brien at Ballydoyle. Like many Coolmore horses, the official details of her ownership have changed from race to race: she has sometimes been listed as being the property of Derrick Smith, whilst on other occasions she has been described as being owned by a partnership of Smith, Michael Tabor and Susan Magnier.

== Racing career ==
=== 2015: two-year-old season ===
Minding began her racing career in a seven furlong maiden race at Leopardstown Racecourse on 11 June 2015 in which she was ridden by Seamie Heffernan. Starting the 11/4 third choice in a seven-runner field, she led for most of the way before being overtaken inside the final furlong and finished second to the Dermot Weld-trained favourite Tanaza. Two weeks later at the same course, the filly was brought back in distance for a six furlong maiden and started 2/5 favourite against three opponents. Heffernan settled the filly in second place before taking the lead two furlong from the finish and Minding drew away to win "very easily" by five and a half lengths.

Minding was stepped up in class for the Group Two Debutante Stakes over seven furlongs at the Curragh on 22 August. Ridden by Colm O'Donoghue she started at odds of 8/1, behind her stable companions Ballydoyle and Alice Springs, and the Grangecon Stud Stakes winner Most Beautiful. After settling behind the leaders, she made steady progress in the second half of the races to take second place, two lengths behind Ballydoyle. On 13 September, over the same course and distance, Minding and Ballydoyle met again in the Group One Moyglare Stud Stakes. Ballydoyle started favourite ahead of Tanaza and the British challenger Blue Bayou (Sweet Solera Stakes) with Minding fourth in the betting on 15/2. The other five runners included Now or Never (runner-up in the Futurity Stakes), Great Page (Prix du Calvados) and Alice Springs. Ridden by Heffernan, Minding tracked the leaders as Ballydoyle made the running before moving into second place in the last quarter mile. She overtook Ballydoyle 100 yards from the finish and won by three quarters of a length with Alice Springs half a length away in third. Aidan O'Brien, having trained the first three home said "We knew Minding would handle [the soft ground] as her dam handled it well... we thought she had improved and she did. She got the trip well. I'm delighted with all three fillies. Seamie gave her a lovely, patient ride".

On 9 October, Minding was sent to England and moved up in distance for the Group One Fillies' Mile at Newmarket Racecourse in which she was ridden by Ryan Moore. She was made 5/4 favourite in a ten-runner field with her main opposition appearing to come from the John Gosden-trained Nathra (unbeaten in two races) and the C. L. Weld Park Stakes winner Coolmore. The other fancied runners were Hawksmoor (Prestige Stakes) and the Luca Cumani-trained maiden winner Beautiful Morning. Moore settled the filly just behind the leaders as Hawksmoor set the pace before moving forward in the last quarter mile. Minding overtook Hawksmoor approaching the final furlong and drew away to win easily by four and a half lengths from Nathra, with Hawksmoor two and a quarter lengths back in third. Moore commented "She's a truly exceptional filly. She travelled well all the way through. As soon as I pulled her out the race was over in seconds".

=== 2016: three-year-old season ===
==== Spring ====
Minding made her three-year-old debut in the 203rd running of the 1000 Guineas on 1 May over Newmarket's Rowley Mile in which she was ridden by Moore and started the 11/10 favourite. Her fifteen opponents included Lumiere, Ballydoyle, Nathra, Alice Springs, Illuminate (Albany Stakes, Duchess of Cambridge Stakes), Jet Setting (Leopardstown 1,000 Guineas Trial) and Midweek (runner-up in the Prix Imprudence). Minding started quickly and settled behind the leaders before going to the front approaching the last quarter mile. She quickly went clear of the field and stayed on strongly in the closing stages to win by three and a half lengths from Ballydoyle. Alice Springs took third place ahead of the 40/1 outsider Fireglow to complete a 1-2-3 for the O'Brien stable. After the race Moore said "She's out on her own, really. She's just faster than them and stays better than them. We were going very comfortably and had them all in trouble at halfway." O'Brien, who was winning his 250th Group One race did not rule out the possibility of running Minding against colts in The Derby but indicated that the Irish 1,000 Guineas and The Oaks were more likely targets.

Three weeks later Minding started 4/11 favourite against nine opponents in the Irish 1000 Guineas at the Curragh. She raced in third place before staying on in the closing stages but failed to overhaul the leader Jet Setting and finished second, beaten a head, with a gap of ten lengths back to Now or Never in third.

==== Summer ====
On 3 June Minding was stepped up in distance for the Oaks Stakes over one and a half miles at Epsom Racecourse and started the 11/10 favourite. Her eight opponents included Skiffle (Height of Fashion Stakes), Turret Rocks, Somehow (Cheshire Oaks) and Seventh Heaven (Fillies' Trial Stakes). Ridden by Moore she began to make progress from the rear of the field as the field rounded Tattenham Corner but was hampered and dropped back entering the straight. Moore was forced to switch left, then right to obtain a run, but once Minding was free of obstructions she showed good acceleration and overtook the leader Architecture a furlong from the finish. She increased her lead in the closing stages to win by 1 3/4 lengths from Architecture, with eight lengths back to Harlequeen in third. Aidan O'Brien commented "She has speed, class, stamina, a great mind – everything. Ryan did brilliant to win on her after what she went through. Real heart, courage and guts had to come into it... She puts her heart into it so we’ll give her an easy time now, I’d have thought, and then pick a target".

Only four fillies appeared to oppose Minding when she was matched against older horses for the first time in the Pretty Polly Stakes over ten furlongs at the Curragh on 26 June. Ridden by Moore, she went off the 1/5 favourite ahead of Koora (St Simon Stakes) and Lucida (Rockfel Stakes), Speedy Boarding (Prix Corrida) and Bocca Baciata (Dance Design Stakes). Bocca Baciata set the pace and was more than six lengths clear of her rivals entering the straight, but Minding took the lead inside the final furlong and drew away to win by four and a half lengths with a gap of five lengths back to Lucida in third. Minding was then sent back to England for the Group One Nassau Stakes over ten furlongs at Goodwood Racecourse on 30 July and started the 1/5 favourite against four opponents. She met some trouble in running and was not particularly impressive in prevailing by one and a quarter lengths from Queen's Trust, a filly whose best previous effort had been a fourth place in the Ribblesdale Stakes. Ryan Moore commented "It was always going to be a messy sort of race. I just tried to keep it as simple as I could. She was only doing what she had to do".

==== Autumn ====
On 10 September Minding was matched against male opposition for the first time in the Irish Champion Stakes over ten furlongs at Leopardstown. She started 9/4 second favourite behind Harzand in a twelve-runner field which also included Found, Almanzor, New Bay, Highland Reel and Hawkbill. After racing in mid-division she stayed on in the straight without looking likely to win and finished third behind Almanzor and Found.

Minding was brought back in distance on 15 October to contest the Queen Elizabeth II Stakes over one mile at Ascot Racecourse. Ridden by Moore she started the 7/2 favourite in a thirteen-runner field which included Galileo Gold, Awtaad, Ribchester (Prix Jacques Le Marois), Hit It A Bomb (Breeders' Cup Juvenile Turf), Lightning Spear (Celebration Mile) and Jet Setting. Racing down the centre of the course, Minding tracked the leaders before taking the lead a quarter of a mile from the finish. She opened up a clear advantage over her opponents before holding off the late challenges of Ribchester and Lightning Spear to win by half a length and a length.

=== 2017: four-year-old season ===
Minding began her third season in the Group 2 Mooresbridge Stakes over ten furlongs at Naas Racecourse on 1 May. She started the 1/3 favourite against three male opponents and won "easily" by three and a half lengths from Moonlight Magic after taking the lead soon after the start. Shortly after the race she sustained a pastern injury and in July it was announced that she had been retired from racing. O'Brien commented "we felt it would be a bit of a struggle to get her back for the remainder of the season so the lads decided that the best option was to retire her as she was too important... She had the most brilliant physique and a wonderful pedigree. Above all, it was her mind that made her special because she was such a pleasure to deal with and had a brilliant attitude. She was incredibly well-named".

== Assessment and honours ==
On 10 November 2015, Minding was named Cartier Champion Two-year-old Filly at the 25th edition of the Cartier Racing Awards. In January 2016 Minding was officially rated the best two-year-old filly in Europe and the third best juvenile behind the colts Air Force Blue and Shalaa. On 8 November 2016 Minding won her second and third Cartier Awards as she was named Champion three-year-old filly and Horse of the Year. In December she was named Irish Horse of the Year at the Horse Racing Ireland Awards. In the 2016 edition of the World's Best Racehorse Rankings Minding was given a rating of 122, making her the 18th best racehorse in the world and the top-rated three-year-old filly (level with Songbird).

== Pedigree ==
Pedigree of Minding (IRE), bay mare, 2013
Sire Galileo (IRE) 1998	Sadler's Wells (USA); 1981	Northern Dancer (CAN)	Nearctic
Sire Galileo (IRE) 1998	Sadler's Wells (USA); 1981	Northern Dancer (CAN)	Natalma (USA)
Sire Galileo (IRE) 1998	Sadler's Wells (USA); 1981	Fairy Bridge	Bold Reason
Sire Galileo (IRE) 1998	Sadler's Wells (USA); 1981	Fairy Bridge	Special
Sire Galileo (IRE) 1998	Urban Sea (USA) ch. 1989	Miswaki	Mr. Prospector
Sire Galileo (IRE) 1998	Urban Sea (USA) ch. 1989	Miswaki	Hopespringseternal
Sire Galileo (IRE) 1998	Urban Sea (USA) ch. 1989	Allegretta (GB)	Lombard (GER)
Sire Galileo (IRE) 1998	Urban Sea (USA) ch. 1989	Allegretta (GB)	Anatevka (GER)
Dam Lillie Langtry (IRE) 2007	Danehill Dancer (IRE); 1993	Danehill (USA)	Danzig
Dam Lillie Langtry (IRE) 2007	Danehill Dancer (IRE); 1993	Danehill (USA)	Razyana
Dam Lillie Langtry (IRE) 2007	Danehill Dancer (IRE); 1993	Mira Adonde (USA)	Sharpen Up (GB)
Dam Lillie Langtry (IRE) 2007	Danehill Dancer (IRE); 1993	Mira Adonde (USA)	Lettre d'Amour
Dam Lillie Langtry (IRE) 2007	Hoity Toity (GB); 2000	Darshaan	Shirley Heights
Dam Lillie Langtry (IRE) 2007	Hoity Toity (GB); 2000	Darshaan	Delsy (FR)
Dam Lillie Langtry (IRE) 2007	Hoity Toity (GB); 2000	Hiwayaati	Shadeed (USA)
Dam Lillie Langtry (IRE) 2007	Hoity Toity (GB); 2000	Hiwayaati	Alathea (Family: 1-d)
