= Leopardstown 1,000 Guineas Trial Stakes =

Flat horse race in Ireland

- Class: Group 3
- Location: Leopardstown; County Dublin, Ireland
- Race type: Flat / Thoroughbred
- Sponsor: Ballylinch Stud
- Website: Leopardstown

Race information
- Distance: 7f (1,408 metres)
- Surface: Turf
- Track: Left-handed
- Qualification: Three-year-old fillies
- Weight: 9 st 2 lb Penalties; 3 lb for G1 / G2 winners
- Purse: €55,000 (2021); 1st: €32,450

Leopardstown 1,000 Guineas Trial
2026
True Love	Magny Cours	Pivotal Attack

Previous years
2025
Swelter	Exactly	Cercene
2024
A Lilac Rolla	Kitty Rose	Buttons
2023
Never Ending Story	Matilda Picotte	Zarinsk
2022
Homeless Songs	Agartha	Villanova Queen
2021
Keeper Of Time	Mehnah	Sense Of Style

2020-2011
2020
Love Locket	Know It All	Precious Moments
2019
Lady Kaya	Happen	Iridessa
2018
Who's Steph	Yulong Gold Fairy	I Can Fly
2017
Hydrangea	Winter	Rehana
2016
Jet Setting	Now Or Never	Alice Springs
2015
Stormfly	Devonshire	Military Angel
2014
Bracelet	Balansiya	Avenue Gabriel
2013
Rawaaq	What Style	Snow Queen
2012
Homecoming Queen	Fire Lily	Up
2011
Empowering	Wild Wind	History Note

2010-2001
2010
Lady Springbank	Duchess Of Foxland	Crystal Gal
2009
Maoineach	Heart Shaped	Smart Coco
2008
Carribean Sunset	Halfway To Heaven	Saoirse Abu
2007
Arch Swing	Four Sins	Theann
2006
Kamarinskaya	Beauty Bright	Ugo Fire
2005
Virginia Waters	Sweet Treat	Crystal View
2004
Royal Tigress	Takrice	Misty Heights
2003
Dimitrova	L'Ancresse	Shangri La
2002
Lahinch	Marionnaud	Mahsusie
2001
Rebelline	Imagine	Princess Nutley

2000-1991
2000
Amethyst	Aretha	Margay
1999
Show Me The Money	Apparatchik	Artistic Blue
1998
Idle Rich	Kitza	Woodwin
1997
Classic Park	Chania	Almost Skint
1996
Sheraka	Tirol Hope	Dance Clear
1995
Khaytada	Mediation	Sharp Point
1994
Kotama	Memories	Miss Sacha
1993
Miami Sands	Weekend Madness	Take No Chances
1992
Gdansk's Honour	Track Twenty Nine	Khanata
1991
Kooyonga	Isle Of Glass	Flowing

1990-1988
1990
Welsh Muffin	Khalafiya	Northern Pet
1989
Tursanah	Antipathy	Honoria
1988
Bell Tower	Fitzrovia	Fitzrovia

The Leopardstown 1,000 Guineas Trial Stakes is a Group 3 flat horse race in Ireland open to three-year-old thoroughbred fillies. It is run over a distance of 7 furlongs (1,408 metres) at Leopardstown in March or April.

== History ==
The event used to be staged at Phoenix Park under the title 1,000 Guineas Trial. For a period it held Group 3 status. It was downgraded to Listed level in 1987.

The 1,000 Guineas Trial was transferred to Leopardstown in 1991. It regained Group 3 status in 2005.

The race can serve as a trial for various fillies' Classics in Europe. The last participant to win the Irish 1,000 Guineas was the 2022 winner, Homeless Songs. The last to achieve victory in the 1000 Guineas was True Love in 2026.

== Records ==
Leading jockey since 1986 (6 wins):

- Michael Kinane – Claxton's Slew (1987), Welsh Muffin (1990), Idle Rich (1998), Amethyst (2000), Lahinch (2002), Arch Swing (2007)

Leading trainer since 1986 (13 wins):

- Aidan O'Brien – Classic Park (1997), Amethyst (2000), Lahinch (2002), Royal Tigress (2004), Virginia Waters (2005), Kamarinskaya (2006), Empowering (2011), Homecoming Queen (2012), Bracelet (2014), Hydrangea (2017), Love Locket (2020), Never Ending Story (2023), True Love (2026)

== Winners since 1986 ==
Year	Winner	Jockey	Trainer	Time
1986	The Bean Sidhe	Charlie Swan	John Hayden
1987	Claxton's Slew	Michael Kinane	Dermot Weld	1:27.50
1988	Bell Tower	Declan Gillespie	Michael Grassick	1:31.10
1989	Tursanah	David Parnell	Kevin Prendergast	1:31.30
1990	Welsh Muffin (Note: The 1990 running was contested over 1 mile)	Michael Kinane	Dermot Weld	1:38.90
1991	Kooyonga	Warren O'Connor	Michael Kauntze	1:30.70
1992	Gdansk's Honour	Christy Roche	Jim Bolger	1:32.50
1993	Miami Sands	Richard Hughes	John Oxx	1:34.10
1994	Kotama	Johnny Murtagh	John Oxx	1:32.40
1995	Khaytada	Johnny Murtagh	John Oxx	1:32.20
1996	Sheraka	Johnny Murtagh	John Oxx	1:33.30
1997	Classic Park	Stephen Craine	Aidan O'Brien	1:27.20
1998	Idle Rich	Michael Kinane	Dermot Weld	1:38.40
1999	Show Me the Money	Richard Hughes	Noel Meade	1:26.60
2000	Amethyst	Michael Kinane	Aidan O'Brien	1:36.90
2001	Rebelline	Declan McDonogh	Kevin Prendergast	1:37.20
2002	Lahinch	Michael Kinane	Aidan O'Brien	1:29.60
2003	Dimitrova	Pat Smullen	Dermot Weld	1:28.00
2004	Royal Tigress	Jamie Spencer	Aidan O'Brien	1:39.20
2005	Virginia Waters	Kieren Fallon	Aidan O'Brien	1:36.30
2006	Kamarinskaya	Seamie Heffernan	Aidan O'Brien	1:32.10
2007	Arch Swing	Michael Kinane	John Oxx	1:29.30
2008	Carribean Sunset	Pat Smullen	Dermot Weld	1:28.94
2009	Maoineach	Kevin Manning	Jim Bolger	1:27.96
2010	Lady Springbank	Jim Crowley	Paul Deegan	1:33.91
2011	Empowering	Joseph O'Brien	Aidan O'Brien	1:29.09
2012	Homecoming Queen	Colm O'Donoghue	Aidan O'Brien	1:30.98
2013	Rawaaq	Pat Smullen	Dermot Weld	1:36.84
2014	Bracelet	Joseph O'Brien	Aidan O'Brien	1:33.70
2015	Stormfly	Pat Smullen	Dermot Weld	1:38.37
2016	Jet Setting	Shane Foley	Adrian Paul Keatley	1:34.79
2017	Hydrangea	Padraig Beggy	Aidan O'Brien	1:28.43
2018	Who's Steph	Colin Keane	Ger Lyons	1:39.01
2019	Lady Kaya	Robbie Colgan	Sheila Lavery	1:31.14
2020	Love Locket (Note: The 2020 race was run as the Leopardstown Fillies Trial Stakes in June due to the COVID-19 pandemic in the Republic of Ireland)	Seamie Heffernan	Aidan O'Brien	1:29.16
2021	Keeper of Time	Ronan Whelan	John Feane	1:28.29
2022	Homeless Songs	Chris Hayes	Dermot Weld	1:28.96
2023	Never Ending Story	Ryan Moore	Aidan O'Brien	1:37.43
2024	A Lilac Rolla	Billy Lee	Paddy Twomey	1:40.89
2025	Swelter	Chris Hayes	Dermot Weld	1:27.50
2026	True Love	Ryan Moore	Aidan O'Brien	1:33.02

== See also ==
- Horse racing in Ireland
- List of Irish flat horse races
