= Seamie Heffernan =

Irish flat racing jockey

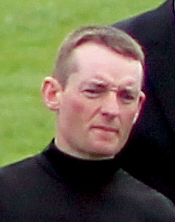
- Heffernan at 2012 Epsom Derby

Personal information
- Born: 17 July 1972 (age 54) Caragh County Kildare, Ireland
- Occupation: Jockey
- Children: 2

Horse racing career
- Sport: Horse racing

Major racing wins
- Irish Classic Races: Irish 1,000 Guineas (2001, 2008, 2011, 2020, 2021); Irish Derby (2007, 2008, 2017, 2020); Irish Oaks (2016); Irish St. Leger (2008); British Classic Races: Epsom Derby (2019); Epsom Oaks (2012); Other major races: Breeders' Cup Turf (2016); Cheveley Park Stakes (2016); Critérium International (2006); Eclipse Stakes (2011); International Stakes (2013, 2014); Irish Champion Stakes (2010, 2011, 2020); Middle Park Stakes (2011, 2017); Moyglare Stud Stakes (2008, 2010, 2015); Phoenix Stakes (2012, 2016); Prix de l'Opéra (2017); Sun Chariot Stakes (2008); Tattersalls Gold Cup (2018); Vincent O'Brien National Stakes (2000, 2011)

Racing awards
- Irish flat racing Champion Apprentice (1994)

Significant horses
- Again, Anthony Van Dyck, Beckett, Brave Anna, Cape Blanco, Capri, Caravaggio, Crusade, Empress Josephine, Frozen Fire, Halfway to Heaven, Imagine, Magical, Minding, Misty for Me, Mount Nelson, Peaceful, Pedro the Great, Power, Rhododendron, Santiago, Septimus, Seventh Heaven, So You Think, Soldier of Fortune, U S Navy Flag, Was
- Updated on 24 March 2024

James Anthony "Seamie" Heffernan (born 17 July 1972) is an Irish flat racing jockey associated for most of his career with the stable of horse racing trainer Aidan O'Brien. From a family with no racing connections, Heffernan was introduced to the sport when he took a summer holiday job with the National Hunt trainer Arthur Moore. He began his racing career as an apprentice jockey for P J Finn and rode his first winner on 10 August 1988 at the age of sixteen. When Finn retired he moved to the yard of Jim Bolger and shared the Irish champion apprentices title in 1994. He was runner-up in the same competition in 1995 and moved to Aidan O'Brien's Ballydoyle stable in 1996 where he was second jockey after Christy Roche.

Heffernan remained at Ballydoyle for nearly three decades and rode his first Group One winner on Beckett in the 2000 National Stakes and his first Classic winner on Imagine in the Irish 1,000 Guineas in 2001. He has ridden a further nine Irish Classic winners, including four victories in the Irish Derby, in addition to riding the Epsom Derby runner-up in 2009 and 2010. He scored his first English Classic victory when Was won the 2012 Epsom Oaks. In 2019, Heffernan rode Anthony Van Dyck under trainer Aidan O'Brien to win his first Derby victory. The win he said stood out most, however, was winning the Breeders' Cup Turf on Highland Reel in 2016.

On the eve of the 2024 Irish flat season, Heffernan announced he was leaving his permanent position at Ballydoyle for a new career as a freelance jockey, although both parties stressed there had been no falling out and said they expected to work together again in future.

He has two children.

== Major wins ==
(Republic of Ireland) Ireland

- Irish Oaks – (1) – Seventh Heaven (2016)
- Irish 1,000 Guineas - (5) - Imagine (2001), Halfway to Heaven (2008), Misty for Me (2011), Peaceful (2020), Empress Josephine (2021)
- Irish Champion Stakes - (3) - Cape Blanco (2010), So You Think (2011), Magical (2020)
- Irish Derby – (4) – Soldier of Fortune (2007), Frozen Fire (2008), Capri (2017), Santiago (2020)
- Irish St. Leger – (1) – Septimus (2008)
- Moyglare Stud Stakes - (3) - Again (2008), Misty for Me (2010), Minding (2015)
- National Stakes - (2) - Beckett (2000), Power (2010)
- Phoenix Stakes - (2) - Pedro the Great (2012), Caravaggio (2016)
- Pretty Polly Stakes - (3) - Misty for Me (2011), Diamondsandrubies (2015), Magical (2020)
- Tattersalls Gold Cup - (1) -Lancaster Bomber (2018)

France

- Critérium International - (1) - Mount Nelson (2006)
- Prix de l'Opéra - (1) - Rhododendron (2017)

(United Kingdom) Great Britain

- Cheveley Park Stakes – (1) – Brave Anna (2016)
- Eclipse Stakes – (1) – So You Think (2011)
- Epsom Derby - (1) - Anthony Van Dyck (2019)
- Epsom Oaks – (1) – Was (2012)
- Middle Park Stakes – (2) – Crusade (2011), US Navy Flag (2017)
- Sun Chariot Stakes – (1) – Halfway to Heaven (2008)

United States

- Breeders' Cup Turf - (1) - Highland Reel (2016)
- Secretariat Stakes - (1) - Highland Reel (2015)
