= Shadeed =

American-bred Thoroughbred racehorse (1982–2005)

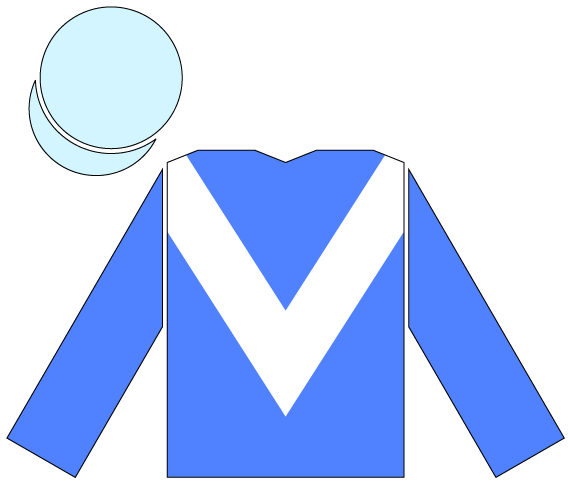
- Racing colours of Maktoum Al Maktoum
- Sire: Nijinsky
- Grandsire: Northern Dancer
- Dam: Continual
- Damsire: Damascus
- Sex: Stallion
- Foaled: 1982
- Country: United States
- Colour: Bay
- Breeder: Cherry Valley Farm Inc. & The Gamely Corp
- Owner: Maktoum bin Rashid Al Maktoum
- Trainer: Michael Stoute
- Record: 7:4-0-2

Major wins
- Craven Stakes (1985); 2000 Guineas (1985); Queen Elizabeth II Stakes (1985); Timeform rating: 135

Awards
- Champion Three-Year-old Miler Colt (1985)
- Last updated on 26 July 2022

Shadeed (1982–2005) was an American-bred, British-trained Thoroughbred racehorse and sire. In a career that lasted from October 1984 to November 1985, he ran seven times and won four races. In 1985, he was the highest-rated three-year-old in Europe over one mile when he won the 2000 Guineas and the Queen Elizabeth II Stakes. On his final start he became the first winner of a British Classic to compete in the Breeders' Cup when he took third place in the Breeders' Cup Mile at Aqueduct Race Track.

== Background ==
Shadeed was a big, rangy bay horse with a small white star bred in Kentucky by Cherry Tree Farm. He was sired by the Triple Crown winner Nijinsky out of the American-bred mare Continual, making him a close relative of the Kentucky Derby winner Swale. As a yearling he was consigned to the Keeneland Select sale in July 1983, where he was bought for $800,000 by a representative of Maktoum bin Rashid Al Maktoum. He was sent into training with Michael Stoute at Newmarket, Suffolk. "Shadeed" (شديد) is an Arabic word meaning "strong".

== Racing career ==
=== 1984: two-year-old season ===
Shadeed made his first appearance in the Westley Maiden Stakes at Newmarket in October, where he started favourite. He finished third, beaten one and a half lengths and a short head behind the 33/1 outsider Kala Dancer and Al Riyadh. The form of the race was boosted when Kala Dancer won the Group One Dewhurst Stakes, Britain's most prestigious race for two-year-olds at Newmarket later in the month. At the same meeting, Shadeed ran against fourteen opponents in the Houghton Stakes. He tracked the leaders in the early stages before moving into the lead two furlongs from the finish and pulling clear to win easily by two and a half lengths from Tiber Creek. Although he had not contested a Group race he was made favourite for the following season's 2000 Guineas and Epsom Derby. In the International Classification he was given a rating of 76, eight pounds below the top-rated Kala Dancer.

=== 1985: three-year-old season ===
Shadeed made his three-year-old debut in the Craven Stakes over one mile at Newmarket on 16 April. Ridden by Walter Swinburn he started 9/4 joint-favourite with Local Suitor. Shadeed took the lead two furlongs from the finish and pulled away to win by six lengths from Damister. In the 2000 Guineas over the same course and distance sixteen days later he started 4/5 favourite against thirteen other colts. Before the race he seemed highly agitated and was sent to the start without taking part in the parade in front of the stands, for which offence Stoute was fined by the racecourse stewards. With Swinburn suspended, he was ridden by the veteran Lester Piggott who had previously agreed to ride Bairn for trainer Luca Cumani. Shadeed went to the front two furlongs out and looked likely to win easily, but was strongly challenged by Bairn and had to be ridden out to win by a head.

On 5 June Shadeed started 7/2 second favourite for The Derby. Despite concerns about his temperament, Shadeed appeared calm before the race. However, he ran "deplorably", never figuring among the leaders and finishing thirteenth of the fourteen runners behind Slip Anchor, beaten by more than fifty lengths. So poor was his performance that Stoute and Swinburn were called before the racecourse stewards but were unable to offer an explanation. Swinburn offered the observation that Shadeed "died in my hands... as if he'd been shot."

Shadeed did not run again for well over three months before returning to one mile for the Queen Elizabeth II Stakes at Ascot on 28 September. He took the lead at half way and drew clear in the straight to win by two and a half lengths from the Arlington Million winner Teleprompter in a course record time of 1:38.8. On 2 November at Aqueduct, Shadeed was one of four British runners in the second running of the Breeders' Cup Mile. He finished fourth, three lengths behind the winner Cozzene, but was promoted to third on the disqualification of the runner-up, Palace Music.

== Assessment ==
Timeform rated Shadeed at 101p as a two-year-old: the p signifying that, in the opinion of Timeform, he was very likely to improve on the figure. As a three-year-old he was given the high rating of 135. In the International Classification for 1985 he was given a rating of 91, the highest for a three-year-old in the 6½ to 10½ division. The figure place him sixth among all European-trained horses behind Slip Anchor (95), Petoski (94), Rainbow Quest (93), Sagace (93) and Pebbles (92).

== Stud career ==
Shadeed was retired to stand as a stallion at the Gainsborough Farm at Versailles, Kentucky. During his stud career he sired the winners of more than two hundred races including the 1000 Guineas winning fillies Shadayid and Sayyedati, while his colts included Alydeed, winner of the (Queen's Plate) and runner-up in the Preakness Stakes. He was retired from stud duties in 2004 and died in November 2005. He was buried at the Gainsborough Farm.

== Pedigree ==
Pedigree of Shadeed (USA), bay stallion, 1982
Sire Nijinsky (CAN) 1967	Northern Dancer; 1961	Nearctic	Nearco
Sire Nijinsky (CAN) 1967	Northern Dancer; 1961	Nearctic	Lady Angela
Sire Nijinsky (CAN) 1967	Northern Dancer; 1961	Natalma	Native Dancer
Sire Nijinsky (CAN) 1967	Northern Dancer; 1961	Natalma	Almahmoud
Sire Nijinsky (CAN) 1967	Flaming Page; 1959	Bull Page	Bull Lea
Sire Nijinsky (CAN) 1967	Flaming Page; 1959	Bull Page	Our Page
Sire Nijinsky (CAN) 1967	Flaming Page; 1959	Flaring Top	Menow
Sire Nijinsky (CAN) 1967	Flaming Page; 1959	Flaring Top	Flaming Top
Dam Continual (USA) 1976	Damascus; 1964	Sword Dancer	Sunglow
Dam Continual (USA) 1976	Damascus; 1964	Sword Dancer	Highland Fling
Dam Continual (USA) 1976	Damascus; 1964	Kerala	My Babu
Dam Continual (USA) 1976	Damascus; 1964	Kerala	Blade of Time
Dam Continual (USA) 1976	Continuation; 1971	Forli	Aristophanes
Dam Continual (USA) 1976	Continuation; 1971	Forli	Trevisa
Dam Continual (USA) 1976	Continuation; 1971	Continue	Double Jay
Dam Continual (USA) 1976	Continuation; 1971	Continue	Courtesy (Family:1-n)
