= Irish 1,000 Guineas =

Flat horse race in Ireland

- Class: Group 1
- Location: Curragh Racecourse; County Kildare, Ireland
- Inaugurated: 1922
- Race type: Flat / Thoroughbred
- Sponsor: Tattersalls
- Website: Curragh

Race information
- Distance: 1 mile (1,609 metres)
- Surface: Turf
- Track: Right-handed
- Qualification: Three-year-old fillies
- Weight: 9 st 0 lb
- Purse: €460,000 (2022); 1st: €285,000

Irish 1000 Guineas
2026
Precise	True Love	Abashiri

Previous years
2025
Lake Victoria	California Dreamer	Cercene
2024
Fallen Angel	A Lilac Rolla	Opera Singer
2023
Tahiyra	Meditate	Comhra
2022
Homeless Songs	Tuesday	Concert Hall
2021
Empress Josephine	Joan Of Arc	No Speak Alexander

2020-2011
2020
Peaceful	Fancy Blue	So Wonderful
2019
Hermosa	Pretty Pollyanna	Foxtrot Liv
2018
Alpha Centauri	Could It Be Love	Happily
2017
Winter	Roly Poly	Hydrangea
2016
Jet Setting	Minding	Now Or Never
2015
Pleascach	Found	Devonshire
2014
Marvellous	Lightning Thunder	Vote Often
2013
Just The Judge	Rehn's Nest	Just Pretending
2012
Samitar	Ishvana	Princess Sinead
2011
Misty For Me	Together	Laughing Lashes

2010-2001
2010
Bethrah	Anna Salai	Music Show
2009
Again	Lahaleeb	Oh Goodness Me
2008
Halfway To Heaven	Mad About You	Carribean Sunset
2007
Finsceal Beo	Dimenticata	Peeping Fawn
2006
Nightime	Ardbrae Lady	Queen Cleopatra
2005
Saoire	Penkenna Princess	Luas Line
2004
Attraction	Alexander Goldrun	Illustrious Miss
2003
Yesterday	Six Perfections	Dimitrova
2002
Gossamer	Quarter Moon	Starbourne
2001
Imagine	Crystal Music	Toroca

2000-1991
2000
Crimplene	Amethyst	Storm Dream
1999
Hula Angel	Golden Silca	Dazzling Park
1998
Tarascon	Kitza	La Nuit Rose
1997
Classic Park	Strawberry Roan	Caiseal Ros
1996
Matiya	Dance Design	My Branch
1995
Ridgewood Pearl	Warning Shadows	Khaytada
1994
Mehthaaf	Las Meninas	Relatively Special
1993
Nicer	Goodnight Kiss	Danse Royale
1992
Marling	Market Booster	Tarwiya
1991
Kooyonga	Julie La Rousse	Umniyatee

1990-1988
1990
In The Groove	Heart Of Joy	Performing Arts
1989
Ensconse	Aldbourne	Run To Jenny
1988
Trusted Partner	Dancing Goddess	Jungle Gold

The Irish 1,000 Guineas is a Group 1 flat horse race in Ireland open to three-year-old thoroughbred fillies. It is run at the Curragh over a distance of 1 mile (1,609 metres), and it is scheduled to take place each year in May.

== History ==
The event was established in 1922, a year after the launch of the Irish 2,000 Guineas. The inaugural running was won by Lady Violette.

It is Ireland's equivalent of the 1000 Guineas, and in recent years it has taken place three weeks after that race. The field usually includes horses which previously contested the English version, and four have achieved victory in both events; Attraction in 2004, Finsceal Beo in 2007, Winter in 2017 and Hermosa in 2019.

The leading horses from the Irish 1,000 Guineas often go on to compete in the following month's Coronation Stakes. The last to win both races was Precise in 2026.

== Records ==
Leading jockey (7 wins):

- Morny Wing – Lady Violette (1922), Glenshesk (1923), Spiral (1931), Sol Speranza (1937), Gainsworth (1940), Panastrid (1945), Sea Symphony (1947)

Leading trainer (12 wins):

- Aidan O'Brien - Classic Park (1997), Imagine (2001), Yesterday (2003), Halfway To Heaven (2008), Misty For Me (2011), Marvellous (2014), Winter (2017), Hermosa (2019), Peaceful (2020), Empress Josephine (2021), Lake Victoria (2025), Precise (2026)

Leading owner since 1950 (12 wins): (includes part ownership)

- Sue Magnier – Imagine (2001), Yesterday (2003), Halfway to Heaven (2008), Again (2009), Misty for Me (2011), Marvellous (2014), Winter (2017), Hermosa (2019), Peaceful (2020), Empress Josephine (2021), Lake Victoria (2025), Precise (2026)

== Winners since 1960 ==
Year	Winner	Jockey	Trainer	Owner	Time
1960	Zenobia	Liam Ward	Tommy Shaw	Mrs A. Biddle
1961	Lady Senator	Tommy Gosling	P. Ashworth	G. Freeman
1962	Shandon Belle	T. P. Burns	R. Fetherstonhaugh	S. Abbot
1963	Gazpacho	Freddie Palmer	Paddy Prendergast	Mrs J. Mullion
1964	Royal Danseuse	Johnny Roe	Seamus McGrath	Joe McGrath
1965	Ardent Dancer	Bill Rickaby	Tommy Gosling	Mrs P. McAllister
1966	Valoris	J. Power	Vincent O'Brien	Charles Clore
1967	Lacquer	Ron Hutchinson	Harry Wragg	Budgie Moller
1968	Front Row	Eric Eldin	Ryan Jarvis	F. Allen
1969	Wenduyne	Bill Williamson	Paddy Prendergast	J. Mullion
1970	Black Satin	Ron Hutchinson	John Dunlop	W. Reynolds
1971	Favoletta	Lester Piggott	Harry Wragg	Budgie Moller
1972	Pidget	Wally Swinburn	Kevin Prendergast	Norman Butler	1:47.80
1973	Cloonagh	Greville Starkey	Henry Cecil	Arthur Boyd-Rochfort	1:47.40
1974	Gaily	Ron Hutchinson	Dick Hern	Michael Sobell	1:49.50
1975	Miralla	Buster Parnell	Hugh Nugent	Lady Lister Kaye	1:46.10
1976	Sarah Siddons	Christy Roche	Paddy Prendergast	Mrs J R Mullion	1:45.20
1977	Lady Capulet	Tommy Murphy	Vincent O'Brien	Robert Sangster	1:45.20
1978	More So	Christy Roche	Paddy Prendergast	Joan Gelb	1:39.60
1979	Godetia	Lester Piggott	Vincent O'Brien	Robert Sangster	1:52.40
1980	Cairn Rouge	Tony Murray	Michael Cunningham	D. Brady	1:39.10
1981	Arctique Royale	Gabriel Curran	Kevin Prendergast	Jean-Pierre Binet	1:49.30
1982	Prince's Polly	Wally Swinburn	Dermot Weld	Kerry Fitzpatrick	1:40.50
1983	L'Attrayante	Alain Badel	Olivier Douieb	Mrs Charles Thériot	1:49.20
1984	Katies	Philip Robinson	Mick Ryan	Terry Ramsden	1:38.60
1985	Al Bahathri	Tony Murray	Harry Thomson Jones	Hamdan Al Maktoum	1:45.30
1986	Sonic Lady	Walter Swinburn	Michael Stoute	Sheikh Mohammed	1:44.90
1987	Forest Flower	Tony Ives	Ian Balding	Paul Mellon	1:43.90
1988	Trusted Partner	Michael Kinane	Dermot Weld	Moyglare Stud Farm	1:39.90
1989	Ensconse	Ray Cochrane	Luca Cumani	Sheikh Mohammed	1:38.50
1990	In the Groove	Steve Cauthen	David Elsworth	Brian Cooper	1:41.30
1991	Kooyonga	Warren O'Connor	Michael Kauntze	Mitsuo Haga	1:37.20
1992	Marling	Walter Swinburn	Geoff Wragg	Sir Edmund Loder	1:41.50
1993	Nicer	Michael Hills	Barry Hills	Catherine Corbett	1:44.20
1994	Mehthaaf	Willie Carson	John Dunlop	Hamdan Al Maktoum	1:49.00
1995	Ridgewood Pearl	Christy Roche	John Oxx	Anne Coughlan	1:43.90
1996	Matiya	Willie Carson	Ben Hanbury	Hamdan Al Maktoum	1:39.80
1997	Classic Park	Stephen Craine	Aidan O'Brien	Mrs Seamus Burns	1:42.20
1998	Tarascon	Jamie Spencer	Tommy Stack	Jane Rowlinson	1:38.40
1999	Hula Angel	Michael Hills	Barry Hills	Jim Fleming	1:39.10
2000	Crimplene	Philip Robinson	Clive Brittain	Marwan Al Maktoum	1:39.80
2001	Imagine	Seamie Heffernan	Aidan O'Brien	Sue Magnier	1:41.10
2002	Gossamer	Jamie Spencer	Luca Cumani	Gerald Leigh	1:45.50
2003	Yesterday	Michael Kinane	Aidan O'Brien	Sue Magnier	1:40.80
2004	Attraction	Kevin Darley	Mark Johnston	10th Duke of Roxburghe	1:37.60
2005	Saoire	Michael Kinane	Frances Crowley	Joseph Joyce	1:41.50
2006	Nightime	Pat Smullen	Dermot Weld	Marguerite Weld	1:48.30
2007	Finsceal Beo	Kevin Manning	Jim Bolger	Michael Ryan	1:39.30
2008	Halfway to Heaven	Seamie Heffernan	Aidan O'Brien	Tabor / Smith / Magnier	1:40.82
2009	Again	Johnny Murtagh	David Wachman	Tabor / Magnier	1:46.34
2010	Bethrah	Pat Smullen	Dermot Weld	Hamdan Al Maktoum	1:37.49
2011	Misty for Me	Seamie Heffernan	Aidan O'Brien	Tabor / Magnier / Smith	1:35.90
2012	Samitar	Martin Harley	Mick Channon	Martin S. Schwartz	1:38.50
2013	Just The Judge	Jamie Spencer	Charles Hills	Qatar Racing Ltd & Sangster family	1:39.37
2014	Marvellous	Ryan Moore	Aidan O'Brien	Smith / Tabor / Magnier	1:45.52
2015	Pleascach	Kevin Manning	Jim Bolger	Jackie Bolger	1:39.17
2016	Jet Setting	Shane Foley	Adrian Keatley	Equinegrowthpartners Syndicate	1:42.46
2017	Winter	Ryan Moore	Aidan O'Brien	Tabor / Magnier / Smith	1:39.78
2018	Alpha Centauri	Colm O'Donoghue	Jessica Harrington	Niarchos Family	1:38.71
2019	Hermosa	Ryan Moore	Aidan O'Brien	Tabor / Magnier / Smith	1:35.07
2020	Peaceful (Note: The 2020 race was run in June due to the COVID-19 pandemic in the Republic of Ireland)	Seamie Heffernan	Aidan O'Brien	Tabor / Magnier / Smith	1:38.19
2021	Empress Josephine	Seamie Heffernan	Aidan O'Brien	Tabor / Magnier / Smith	1:47.92
2022	Homeless Songs	Chris Hayes	Dermot Weld	Moyglare Stud Farm	1:38.81
2023	Tahiyra	Chris Hayes	Dermot Weld	Aga Khan IV	1:39.89
2024	Fallen Angel	Daniel Tudhope	Karl Burke	Clipper Logistics	1:40.84
2025	Lake Victoria	Ryan Moore	Aidan O'Brien	Tabor / Magnier / Smith	1:36.38
2026	Precise	Wayne Lordan	Aidan O'Brien	Smith / Tabor / Magnier	1:36.98

== Earlier winners ==
- 1922: Lady Violette
- 1923: Glenshesk
- 1924: Voltoi
- 1925: Flying Dinah
- 1926: Resplendent
- 1927: West Indies
- 1928: Moucheron
- 1929: Soloptic
- 1930: Star of Egypt
- 1931: Spiral
- 1932: Petoni
- 1933: Spy-Ann
- 1934: Kyloe
- 1935: Smokeless
- 1936: Harvest Star
- 1937: Sol Speranza
- 1938: Lapel
- 1939: Serpent Star
- 1940: Gainsworth
- 1941: Milady Rose
- 1942: Majideh
- 1943: Suntop
- 1944: Annetta
- 1945: Panastrid
- 1946: Ella Retford
- 1947: Sea Symphony
- 1948: Morning Wings
- 1949: Sunlit Ride
- 1950: Princess Trudy
- 1951: Queen of Sheba
- 1952: Nashua
- 1953: Northern Gleam
- 1954: Pantomime Queen
- 1955: Dark Issue
- 1956: Pederoba
- 1957: Even Star
- 1958: Butiaba
- 1959: Fiorentina

== See also ==
- Horse racing in Ireland
- List of Irish flat horse races
