= 1982 Epsom Derby =

- Derby
- Location: Epsom Downs Racecourse
- Date: 2 June 1982
- Winning horse: Golden Fleece (horse)
- Starting price: 3/1 Fav
- Jockey: Pat Eddery
- Trainer: Vincent O'Brien
- Owner: Robert Sangster
- Conditions: Firm

Epsom Derby 1982
1-2-3
Golden Fleece	Touching Wood	Silver Hawk

Also Ran
4-5-6
Persepolis	Norwick	Palace Gold
7-8-9
Peacetime	Rocamadour	Count Pahlen
10-11-12
Fitzwarren	Tidworth Tattoo	Super Sunrise
13-14-15
Father Rooney	Jalmood	Lobkowiez
16-17-18
Reef Glade	Wongchoi	Florida Son

The 1982 Epsom Derby was the 203rd annual running of the Derby horse race. It took place at Epsom Downs Racecourse on 2 June 1982.

The race was won by Robert Sangster's Golden Fleece, at odds of 3/1 ridden by jockey Pat Eddery and trained at Ballydoyle by Vincent O'Brien. Golden Fleece's win was the sixth in the race for O'Brien and the second for Eddery. The winning time of 2:34.27 was the fastest since Mahmoud's hand-timed 2:33.8 in 1936.

== Race details ==
- Sponsor: none
- Winner's prize money: £146,720
- Going: Firm
- Number of runners: 18
- Winner's time: 2 minutes, 34.27 seconds

== Full result ==
	Dist *	Horse	Jockey	Trainer	SP
1		Golden Fleece	Pat Eddery	Vincent O'Brien (IRE)	3-1
2	3	Touching Wood	Paul Cook	Harry Thomson Jones	40-1
3	1	Silver Hawk	Tony Murray	Michael Albina	14-1
4	hd	Persepolis	Yves Saint-Martin	François Boutin (FR)	4-1
5	1½	Norwick	Greville Starkey	Guy Harwood	33-1
6	3	Palace Gold	Tony Ives	Bill O'Gorman	25-1
7	4	Peacetime	Joe Mercer	Jeremy Tree	6-1
8	4	Rocamadour	Walter Swinburn	Arthur Pitt	20-1
9	1½	Count Pahlen	Geoff Baxter	Bruce Hobbs	33-1
10	2	Fitzwarren	Bob Weaver	Toby Balding	250-1
11	hd	Tidworth Tattoo	Brian Rouse	David Elsworth	300-1
12	hd	Super Sunrise	Edward Hide	Gavin Hunter	20-1
13	shd	Father Rooney	Steve Cauthen	Barry Hills	28-1
14	8	Jalmood	Willie Carson	John Dunlop	4-1
15	4	Lobkowiez	Brian Taylor	Clive Brittain	200-1
16		Reef Glade	Philip Waldron	Patrick Haslam	250-1
17		Wongchoi	David Brosnan	Eric Eldin	150-1
18		Florida Son	Ernie Johnson	J Hanson	250-1

== Winner details ==
Further details of the winner, Golden Fleece:

- Foaled: 1 April 1979, in the United States
- Sire: Nijinsky; Dam: Exotic Treat (Vaguely Noble)
- Owner: Robert Sangster
- Breeder: Mr & Mrs Paul Hexter

== Form analysis ==
=== Two-year-old races ===
Notable runs by the future Derby participants as two-year-olds in 1981:

- Count Pahlen – 3rd in Acomb Stakes, 1st in William Hill Futurity
- Jalmood – 3rd in William Hill Futurity
- Lobkowiez – 3rd in Royal Lodge Stakes
- Norwick – 1st in Royal Lodge Stakes, 2nd in Grand Critérium
- Persepolis – 1st in Prix La Rochette
- Silver Hawk – 1st in Solario Stakes, 2nd in Royal Lodge Stakes
- Wongchoi – 2nd in Somerville Tattersall Stakes

=== The road to Epsom ===
Early-season appearances in 1982 and trial races prior to running in the Derby:

- Count Pahlen – 1st in Blue Riband Trial Stakes
- Father Rooney – 2nd in Chester Vase
- Golden Fleece – 1st in Nijinsky Stakes, 1st in Ballymoss Stakes
- Jalmood – 3rd in Sandown Classic Trial, 1st in Lingfield Derby Trial
- Lobkowiez – 3rd in Chester Vase
- Palace Gold – 2nd in Dante Stakes
- Peacetime – 1st in Sandown Classic Trial, 1st in Predominate Stakes
- Persepolis – 1st in Prix Noailles, 1st in Prix Lupin
- Silver Hawk – 1st in Craven Stakes
- Super Sunrise – 1st in Chester Vase
- Touching Wood – 2nd in Predominate Stakes
- Wongchoi – 3rd in Craven Stakes

=== Subsequent Group 1 wins ===
Group 1 / Grade I victories after running in the Derby.

Jalmood – Premio Presidente della Repubblica (1983)
Touching Wood – St Leger (1982), Irish St Leger (1982)

== Subsequent breeding careers ==
Leading progeny of participants in the 1982 Epsom Derby.

=== Sires of Classic winners ===
Silver Hawk (3rd)

- Benny The Dip – 1st Epsom Derby (1997)
- Mutafaweq – 1st St Leger Stakes (1999)
- Lady In Silver – 1st Prix de Diane (1989)
- Magnificient Style – 1st Musidora Stakes (1996) Dam of Nathaniel, Great Heavens, Playful Act, Echoes In Eternity and Percussionist

=== Sires of Group/Grade One winners ===
Touching Wood (2nd)

- Ashal – 1st Ascot Gold Cup (1990)
- Linesman – 1st Sydney Cup (1997)
- Jeewan – Dam of Borderlescott
- Jadidh – Dam of Sergeant Cecil

=== Sires of National Hunt horses ===
Florida Son (18th)

- Florida Pearl – Winner of 9 Grade 1 chases including Irish Hennessy (1999, 2000, 2001, 2004), King George VI Chase (2001) Punchestown Gold Cup (2002)
- Florida Coast – 2nd Hatton's Grace Hurdle (2003)

Norwick (5th)

- Hebridean – 1st Long Walk Hurdle (1994)
- Star Traveller – 3rd National Hunt Handicap Chase (2001)

=== Other Stallions ===
Golden Fleece (1st) – Pixie Erin (1st 1987 Matron Stakes), King's College (2nd 1987 Tetrarch Stakes), Gold Bracelet (Dam of Lake Kariba)
Jalmood (14th) – Lord Of The Field (3rd 1993 Irish Champion Stakes), Jaljuli (3rd 1988 Cheveley Park Stakes), Jacamar (1st 1988 Chesham Stakes) – Exported to Sweden
Persepolis (4th) – Harlem Shuffle (2nd 1987 Prix Noailles), Sarba (3rd 1988 Prix de Royallieu)
Count Pahlen (9th) – Thunder Grey (3rd 1992 Prix Gladiateur)
Super Sunrise (12th) – Exported to America before returning to Great Britain where he produced a winner of a Kelso Novices' Hurdle
Peacetime (7th) – Exported to South Africa
Rocamadour (8th) – Exported to America
Father Rooney (13th) – Exported to South Africa
Reef Glade (16th) – Exported to Japan
