= Magnificient Style =

American-bred Thoroughbred racehorse

- Sire: Silver Hawk
- Grandsire: Roberto
- Dam: Mia Karina
- Damsire: Icecapade
- Sex: Mare
- Foaled: 21 March 1993
- Country: United States
- Colour: Bay
- Breeder: Buckram Oak Farm
- Owner: Buckram Oak Holdings
- Trainer: Henry Cecil
- Jockey: Willie Ryan; Pat Eddery; Mick Kinane
- Record: 4: 2–0–1
- Earnings: £30,744

Major wins
- Musidora Stakes (1996)

Magnificient Style (foaled 21 March 1993) is an American-bred, British-trained Thoroughbred racehorse. She only raced as a three-year-old, winning two of her four races, including the Musidora Stakes. Since retiring from racing she has become a successful broodmare, with her progeny including Playful Act, Nathaniel and Great Heavens. She was trained by Henry Cecil and owned by Buckram Oak Holdings.

== Background ==
Magnificient Style is a bay mare bred by Buckram Oak Farm and foaled in March 1993. She was sired by Silver Hawk, who won the Craven Stakes and finished third in The Derby. Silver Hawk also sired Epsom Derby winner Benny the Dip and St. Leger Stakes winner Mutafaweq, as well as Grass Wonder, Magnificent Star, Memories of Silver, Nashoba's Key and Wonder Again. Magnificient Style's dam was Mia Karina, a daughter of Icecapade. Mia Karina also foaled Siberian Summer, who won the Grade 1 Strub Stakes in 1993. Magnificient Style was trained by Henry Cecil.

== Racing career ==
Magnificient Style made her racecourse debut on 8 April 1996 in a ten-furlong maiden at Kempton Park. Jockey Willie Ryan held her up near the rear of the field and took the lead with two furlongs left to run. In the closing stages she pulled clear and won by six lengths from Migwar. Magnificient Style's next start came in the Pretty Polly Stakes at Newmarket. She started as the favourite, but Pat Eddery could not get her to settle in the race and she finished third, five and a half lengths behind winner Pricket. Pricket then went on to finish second in the Oaks on her next start.

On 14 May 1996, Magnificient Style started at the price of 5/2 for the Group 3 Musidora Stakes at York and faced four rivals. Ridden by Mick Kinane, she took the lead from the start. She was never caught and won the race by one and three quarter lengths from Sil Sila, with Obsessive a further length behind in third place. Sil Sila won the Prix de Diane in her following race. Magnificient Style's fourth and final race was the Ribblesdale Stakes at Ascot, where she was ridden by Pat Eddery and started as the 13/8 favourite. As in her previous race, she led from the start, however she could not stay in front and faded to finish sixth, over ten lengths behind winner Tulipa. During her racing career, Magnificient Style won £30,744 in prize money.

== Stud career ==
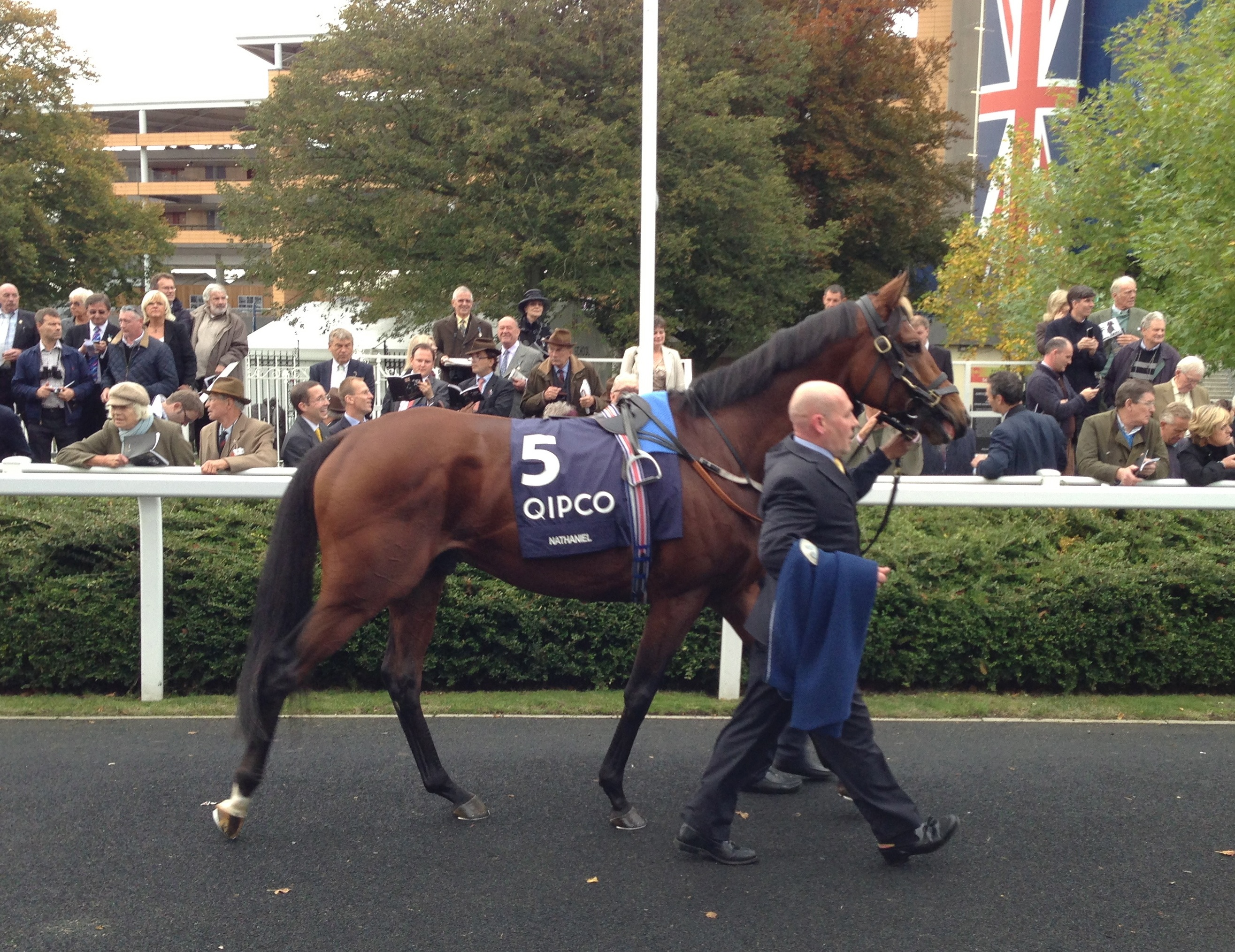
Magnificient Style's son Nathaniel

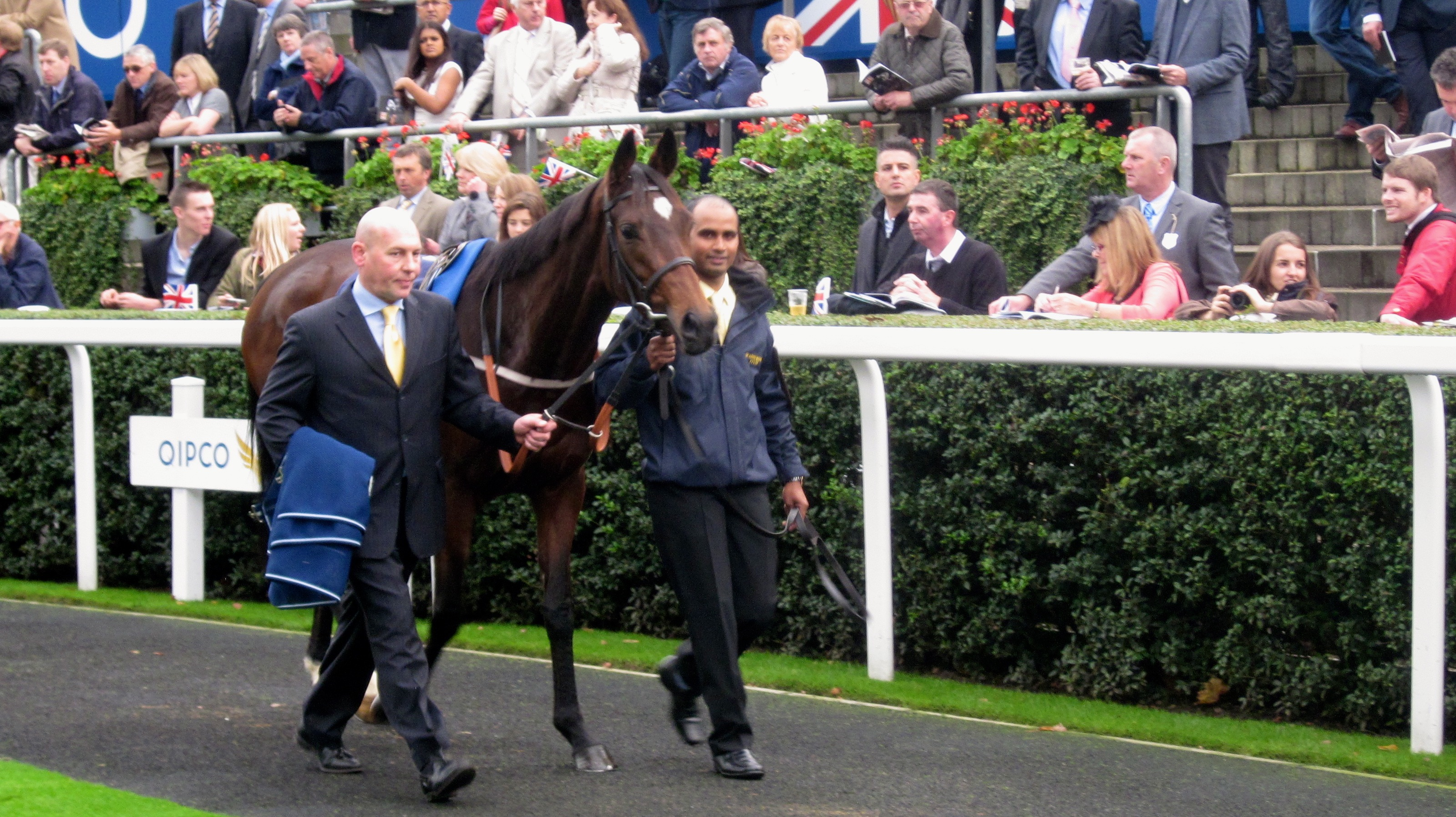
Magnificient Style's daughter Great Heavens

Magnificient Style was retired to Swettenham Stud, where she established herself as a top broodmare. She was purchased privately by Kincorth Investments in 2007, and her foals so far are:

- Stylelistick – a bay mare sired by Storm Cat and foaled in 1999 who won the Appalachian Stakes.
- Echoes In Eternity – a bay mare sired by Spinning World and foaled in 2000. She won four races, including the Sun Chariot Stakes and Park Hill Stakes.
- Percussionist – a bay gelding sired by Sadler's Wells and foaled in 2001. On the flat he won the Lingfield Derby Trial and Yorkshire Cup and finished fourth in the Epsom Derby. Percussionist also raced over hurdles and won the American Grand National in 2010.
- Playful Act – a bay mare sire by Sadler's Wells and foaled in 2002. She was a successful two-year-old, winning the May Hill Stakes and Fillies' Mile. As a three-year-old she won the Lancashire Oaks and finished second in the Irish Oaks. In 2007, Playful Act broke the world record for the auction price of a broodmare, when she was purchased by Sheikh Mohammed for $10.5 million at Keeneland's November breeding stock sale.
- Distinctive Look – a bay mare sired by Danehill and foaled in 2003 who won a maiden race at Goodwood.
- Petara Bay – a bay gelding sired by Peintre Celebre and foaled in 2004. He raced from 2006 to 2012 and won the Feilden Stakes in 2007.
- Changing Skies – a bay mare sired by Sadler's Wells and foaled in 2005 who raced in Europe until being sent to America in 2009, where she won The Very One Stakes and La Prevoyante Handicap, and was just beaten in the Grade 1 Flower Bowl Invitational Stakes.
- Monterey – a bay gelding sired by Montjeu and foaled in 2007 who won two minor races in Great Britain.
- Nathaniel – a bay horse sired by Galileo and foaled in 2008. As a three-year-old in 2011 he won the King Edward VII Stakes and King George VI and Queen Elizabeth Stakes. In 2012 he won the Eclipse Stakes and was just beaten by a nose by Danedream in that years King George VI and Queen Elizabeth Stakes. He now stands as a stallion at Newsells Park Stud for a stud fee of £20,000. His first crop of foals will race as two-year-olds in 2016.
- Great Heavens – a bay mare sired by Galileo and foaled in 2009. She only raced once as a two-year-old, before winning her first four races as a three-year-old in 2012, including the Lancashire Oaks and Irish Oaks. She then finished sixth in the 2012 Prix de l'Arc de Triomphe and fourth in the British Champions Fillies' and Mares' Stakes, which was her last start.
- Throne Room – a bay colt sired by Oasis Dream and foaled in 2011. He raced in two maidens in 2013, finishing fourth and second, but died as a two-year-old.
- Willoughby – an unraced filly sired by Oasis Dream and foaled in 2012.
- Rocksavage – a colt sired by Fastnet Rock and foaled in 2013. He raced twice in 2015 without winning.

== Pedigree ==
Pedigree of Magnificient Style, bay mare 1993
Sire Silver Hawk (USA) b. 1979	Roberto (USA) b. 1969	Hail To Reason br. 1958	Turn-To
Sire Silver Hawk (USA) b. 1979	Roberto (USA) b. 1969	Hail To Reason br. 1958	Nothirdchance
Sire Silver Hawk (USA) b. 1979	Roberto (USA) b. 1969	Bramalea b. 1959	Nashua
Sire Silver Hawk (USA) b. 1979	Roberto (USA) b. 1969	Bramalea b. 1959	Rarelea
Sire Silver Hawk (USA) b. 1979	Gris Vitesse (GB) gr. 1966	Amerigo ch. 1955	Nearco*
Sire Silver Hawk (USA) b. 1979	Gris Vitesse (GB) gr. 1966	Amerigo ch. 1955	Sanlinea
Sire Silver Hawk (USA) b. 1979	Gris Vitesse (GB) gr. 1966	Matchiche II gr. 1956	Mat de Cocagne
Sire Silver Hawk (USA) b. 1979	Gris Vitesse (GB) gr. 1966	Matchiche II gr. 1956	Chimere Fabuleuse
Dam Mia Karina (USA) b. 1983	Icecapade (USA) gr. 1969	Nearctic br. 1954	Nearco*
Dam Mia Karina (USA) b. 1983	Icecapade (USA) gr. 1969	Nearctic br. 1954	Lady Angela
Dam Mia Karina (USA) b. 1983	Icecapade (USA) gr. 1969	Shenanigans gr. 1963	Native Dancer
Dam Mia Karina (USA) b. 1983	Icecapade (USA) gr. 1969	Shenanigans gr. 1963	Bold Irish
Dam Mia Karina (USA) b. 1983	Basin (USA) b. 1972	Tom Rolfe b. 1962	Ribot
Dam Mia Karina (USA) b. 1983	Basin (USA) b. 1972	Tom Rolfe b. 1962	Pocahontas
Dam Mia Karina (USA) b. 1983	Basin (USA) b. 1972	Delta b. 1952	Nasrullah
Dam Mia Karina (USA) b. 1983	Basin (USA) b. 1972	Delta b. 1952	Bourtai

Note: b. = Bay, br. = Brown, ch. = Chestnut, gr. = Grey

* Magnificient Style is inbred 4x4 to Nearco. This means that the stallion appears twice in the fourth generation of her pedigree.
