= Allegretto (horse) =

Irish-bred Thoroughbred racehorse

- Sire: Galileo
- Grandsire: Sadler's Wells
- Dam: Alleluia
- Damsire: Caerleon
- Sex: Mare
- Foaled: 31 January 2003
- Country: Ireland
- Colour: Chestnut
- Breeder: Kirsten Rausing & Airlie Stud
- Owner: Cheveley Park Stud
- Trainer: Michael Stoute
- Record: 18: 6-2-3
- Earnings: £494,982

Major wins
- Lancashire Oaks (2006); Henry II Stakes (2007); Goodwood Cup (2007); Prix Royal-Oak (2007); Park Hill Stakes (2008)

Allegretto (foaled 31 January 2003) is an Irish-bred, British-trained Thoroughbred racehorse and broodmare best known for her performances over extended distances. After finishing fifth on her only appearance as a two-year-old she developed into a high-class performer in the following year when she won the Lancashire Oaks. She reached her peak as a four-year-old in 2007 when she defeated male opposition to take the Henry II Stakes, Goodwood Cup and Prix Royal-Oak. Although she was less successful in 2008 she added a final major victory in the Park Hill Stakes.

== Background ==
Allegretto is a chestnut mare with a narrow white blaze bred in Ireland by the partnership of Kirsten Rausing and the Airlie Stud. In October 2004 the yearling filly was consigned to the Tattersalls sale and was bought for 415,000 guineas by the Cheveley Park Stud. She was sent into training with Michael Stoute at Newmarket, Suffolk.

She was from the first crop of foals sired by Galileo, who won the Derby, Irish Derby and King George VI and Queen Elizabeth Stakes in 2001. Galileo became a very successful breeding stallion and has been champion sire of Great Britain and Ireland five times. His other progeny included Cape Blanco, Frankel, Golden Lilac, Nathaniel, New Approach, Rip Van Winkle, Found, Minding and Ruler of the World. Allegretto's dam Alleluia was a high-class staying mare who won the Doncaster Cup as a three-year-old in 2001. She was a daughter of Alruccaba (foaled 1983) whose other descendants have included Yesterday, Alborada, Quarter Moon, Aussie Rules (Poule d'Essai des Poulains) and Albanova (Preis von Europa).

== Racing career ==
=== 2005: two-year-old season ===
Allegretto made her racecourse debut in a maiden race over one mile (eight furlongs) at Doncaster Racecourse on 21 October in which started at odds of 25/1 and finished fifth, beaten nine and a half lengths by In Dubai.

=== 2006: three-year-old season ===
Allegretto began her second season in the Cheshire Oaks over one and a half miles at Chester Racecourse on 10 May and came home sixth of the twelve runners behind the John Dunlop-trained Time On. The filly was then dropped back in class for a maiden at Chepstow Racecourse on 16 June in which she was ridden by Kieren Fallon and recorded her first victory, coming home a length and a half in front of Nimra at odds of 30/100. She then stepped back up in class to contest the Group 2 Lancashire Oaks at Haydock Park on 8 July in which she was ridden by Ryan Moore and started the 13/2 third choice in the betting behind Princess Nada (Ballymacoll Stud Stakes) and Giulia (fifth in the Epsom Oaks). After tracking the leaders, Allegretto went to the front approaching the final furlong and won by three lengths from the 66/1 outsider Local Spirit.

In the Group 1 Yorkshire Oaks over one and a half miles at York Racecourse in August Allegretto finished third of the six runners behind Alexandrova and Short Skirt. On her final appearance of the season the filly was moved up in distance and matched against older fillies and mares in the Park Hill Stakes which was run that year at York as Doncaster racecourse was closed for redevelopment. She was among the leaders from the start but was unable to make progress in the closing stages and finished third behind Rising Cross and Anna Pavlova.

=== 2007: four-year-old season ===
In 2007, Allegretto competed in long-distance races, and faced male opposition on most occasions. After finishing fifth behind Sergeant Cecil in the Yorkshire Cup she contested the Henry II Stakes over two miles at Sandown Park on 29 May in which she was equipped with a visor for the first time. Ridden by Seb Sanders she started at odds of 12/1 in a seven-runner field which included Tungsten Strike (winner of the race in 2006), Mount Kilimanjaro (Further Flight Stakes) and Under The Rainbow (Zetland Stakes). After racing in third place she took the lead inside the final furlong and kept on "gamely" to win by three quarters of a length from Balkan Knight.

In the Gold Cup at Royal Ascot on 21 June she started at odds of 14/1 and came home ninth of the fourteen runners behind Yeats who was winning the race for a second time. In the Goodwood Cup over two miles at Goodwood Racecourse on 2 August, the filly was ridden by Moore and started the 8/1 third-choice in the betting alongside Balkan Knight in a fifteen-runner field. Geordieland (runner-up in the Ascot Gold Cup) was the 6/4 favourite ahead of Distinction (winner of the race in 2005), while the others included Veracity (second in the Queen's Vase) and Tungsten Strike. After being restrained towards the rear she began to make steady progress when switched to the outside three furlongs from the finish. She overtook Veracity well inside the final furlong and won by half a length, with the front-running Finalmente three quarters of a length back in third. Ryan Moore commented "They went very fast and I always thought I would pick them off as they were coming back to us and she stays very well. I thought she had a bit to find with Geordieland and a few others beforehand, but this is her third Group Two win now".

Allegretto was dropped back in distance in August for a second crack at the Yorkshire Oaks but was beaten into second place by the Irish three-year-old Peeping Fawn. In the following month she ran third behind Septimus and Geordieland in the Doncaster Cup. For her final run of the year the filly was sent to France to contest the Prix Royal Oak over 3100 metres at Longchamp Racecourse on 28 October. Ridden by Moore, she was made the 5.2/1 third choice behind Varevees (Prix Gladiateur) and Lord du Sud (Prix Kergorlay) in an eleven-runner field which also included Le Miracle (Prix du Cadran), Anna Pavlova (Prix de Royallieu), Macleya (Prix de Pomone) and Soapy Danger (Princess of Wales's Stakes). Alegretto raced towards the rear and turned into the straight in ninth place before making a sustained run on the outside. She gained the advantage 70 metres from the finish and took the prize by a short neck from Macleya with Ponte Tresa, Le Miracle, Brisant and Anna Pavlova close behind. After the race Moore said "We went a good pace, which was useful as she needs to stretch out and likes to pass horses. She idled a bit once she got her nose in front and has just done enough".

=== 2008: five-year-old season ===
Allegretto began her fourth season by finishing last of the eight runners behind Finalmente in the Henry II Stakes and then came home a distant fourth behind Yeats in the Ascot Gold Cup. In her third attempt to win the Yorkshire Oaks (run that year at Newmarket) she finished fourth behind the three-year-olds Lush Lashes, Dar Re Mi and Michita. On 11 September the mare ran for the second time in the Park Hill Stakes and started the 7/4 favourite against seven opponents including Gravitation (Lillie Langtry Stakes), Gull Wing (Further Flight Stakes) and Under The Rainbow. After tracking the leaders, Allegretto took the lead approaching the last quarter mile any pulled clear to win "easily" by six lengths from the outsider Perihelion. On her final racecourse appearance she attempted to repeat her 2007 success in the Prix Royal-Oak and produced one of her best performances as she finished second of the eleven runners, beaten one and a half lengths by Yeats.

== Breeding record ==
At the end of her racing career, Allegretto was retired to become a broodmare for the Cheveley Park Stud. Her foals include:

- Baihas, a bay colt (later gelded), foaled in 2010, sired by Nayef. Won one race.
- Alla Breve, bay filly, 2012, by Dansili. Won one race.
- Allegramente, bay filly, 2015, by Dansili
- Jeweller, colt, 2016, by Mastercraftsman

== Pedigree ==
Pedigree of Allegretto (IRE), chestnut mare, 2003
Sire Galileo (IRE) 1998	Sadler's Wells (USA); 1981	Northern Dancer (CAN)	Nearctic
Sire Galileo (IRE) 1998	Sadler's Wells (USA); 1981	Northern Dancer (CAN)	Natalma (USA)
Sire Galileo (IRE) 1998	Sadler's Wells (USA); 1981	Fairy Bridge	Bold Reason
Sire Galileo (IRE) 1998	Sadler's Wells (USA); 1981	Fairy Bridge	Special
Sire Galileo (IRE) 1998	Urban Sea (USA); 1989	Miswaki	Mr. Prospector
Sire Galileo (IRE) 1998	Urban Sea (USA); 1989	Miswaki	Hopespringseternal
Sire Galileo (IRE) 1998	Urban Sea (USA); 1989	Allegretta (GB)	Lombard (GER)
Sire Galileo (IRE) 1998	Urban Sea (USA); 1989	Allegretta (GB)	Anatevka (GER)
Dam Alleluia (GB) 1998	Caerleon (USA); 1980	Nijinsky (CAN)	Northern Dancer
Dam Alleluia (GB) 1998	Caerleon (USA); 1980	Nijinsky (CAN)	Flaming Page
Dam Alleluia (GB) 1998	Caerleon (USA); 1980	Foreseer	Round Table
Dam Alleluia (GB) 1998	Caerleon (USA); 1980	Foreseer	Regal Gleam
Dam Alleluia (GB) 1998	Alruccaba (IRE); 1983	Crystal Palace (FR)	Caro (IRE)
Dam Alleluia (GB) 1998	Alruccaba (IRE); 1983	Crystal Palace (FR)	Hermieres
Dam Alleluia (GB) 1998	Alruccaba (IRE); 1983	Allara (GB)	Zeddaan
Dam Alleluia (GB) 1998	Alruccaba (IRE); 1983	Allara (GB)	Nucciolina (FR) (Family 9-c)

- Allegretto was inbred 3 × 4 to Northern Dancer, meaning that this stallion appears in both the third and fourth generations of her pedigree.
