= Solemia =

Irish-bred Thoroughbred racehorse

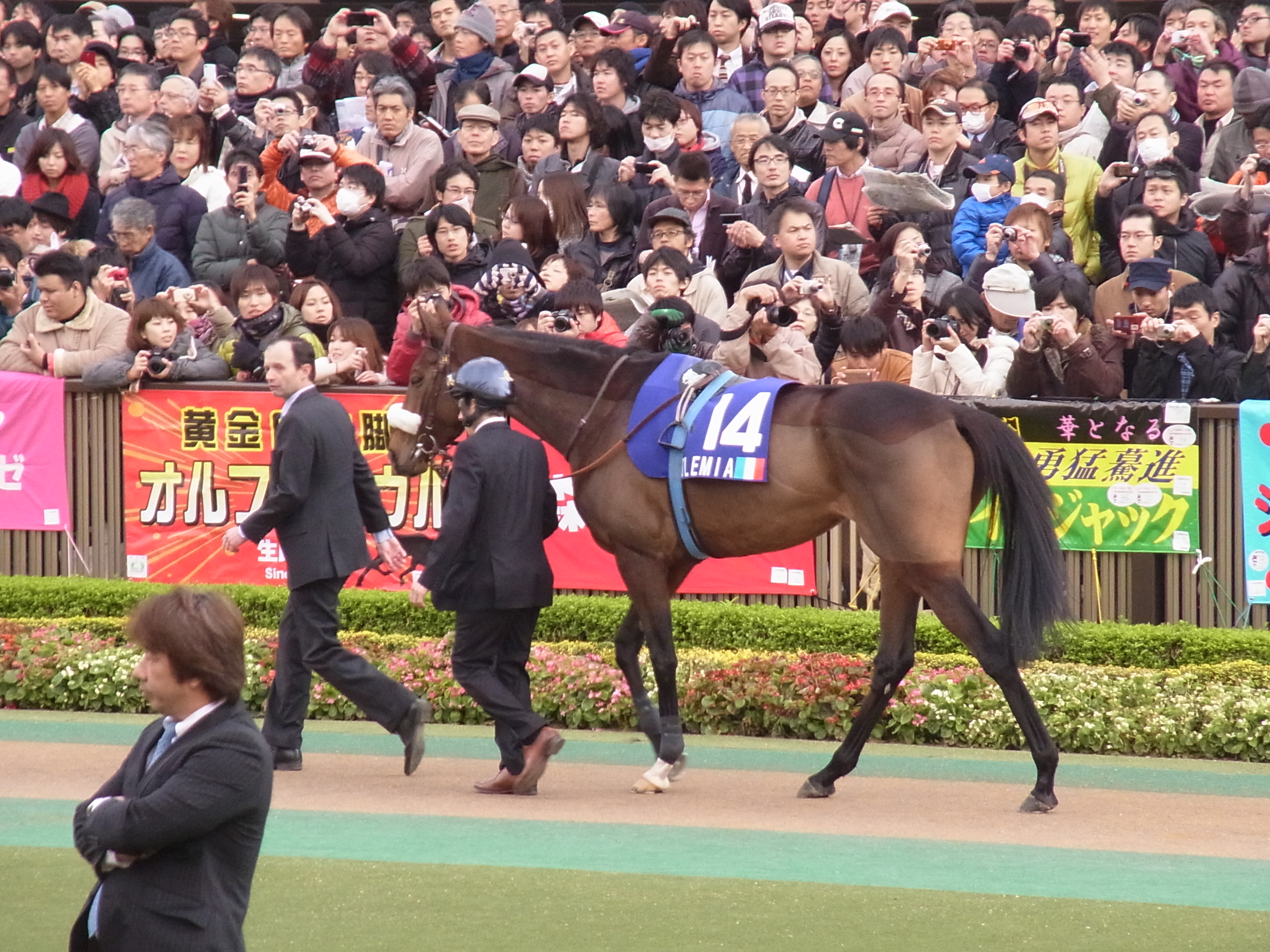
- Solemia at the 2012 Japan Cup
- Sire: Poliglote
- Grandsire: Sadler's Wells
- Dam: Brooklyn's Dance
- Damsire: Shirley Heights
- Sex: Mare
- Foaled: 20 February 2008
- Country: Ireland
- Colour: Bay
- Breeder: Wertheimer et Frère
- Owner: Wertheimer et Frère
- Trainer: Carlos Laffon-Parias
- Record: 14: 5-3-2

Major wins
- Prix Corrida (2012); Prix de l'Arc de Triomphe (2012)

Solemia (foaled 20 February 2008) is an Irish-bred, French-trained Thoroughbred racehorse best known for winning the 2012 Prix de l'Arc de Triomphe. Before her win in the Arc, Solemia had won four of her twelve races, with her biggest win coming in the Group Two Prix Corrida at Saint-Cloud Racecourse in May 2012.

== Background ==
Solemia is a bay filly with a white star bred in Ireland by the Wertheimer family. She was sired by the Critérium de Saint-Cloud winner Poliglote and was the last foal of the mare Brooklyn's Dance, winner of the Prix Cléopâtre. Both of Solemia's parents were owned and bred by the Wertheimers. Before Solemia's arrival, Poliglote's best flat racer had been the dual Grand Prix de Deauville winner Irish Wells. In recent years he has had some success as a sire of steeplechasers. Brooklyn's Dance produced five other stakes winners including the Prix Greffulhe winner Prospect Wells and was also closely related on her dam's side to many good winners including Green Dancer, Authorized, Makfi and Alhaarth.

Solemia is trained at Chantilly by the Spanish-born Carlos Laffon-Parias, and has been ridden to all her successes by Olivier Peslier.

== Racing career ==
=== 2010–2011: early career ===
Solemia did not appear as a two-year-old until October 17 when she finished unplaced in a maiden race at Longchamp. Fifteen days later she recorded her first success when Olivier Peslier rode her to a six length win in a minor race at Maisons-Laffitte.

As a three-year-old, Solemia ran four times at Saint-Cloud in minor stakes races, finishing fifth, third and second before winning her second race in the Listed Prix Joubert over 2400 metres on 30 September. Solemia was moved up to Group class for the first time for her final start of the year in the Prix du Conseil de Paris, in which she was matched against colts and older horses. She finished strongly but failed by a neck to catch the colt Vadamar.

=== 2012: four-year-old season ===
Solemia began her four-year-old season impressively, with a four length win in the Listed Prix Lord Seymour at Longchamp in April. A month later she was made favourite for the Group Three Prix d'Hédouville but was beaten three lengths a head by the British gelding Allied Powers and the filly Molly Malone. She was later promoted to second when the runner-up was disqualified for causing interference. In the Prix Corrida at the end of May at Saint-Cloud, Solemia started at odds of 3/1 in a field which included the 2011 Arc de Triomphe runner-up Shareta. In a closely contested finish, she held off the late challenge of Shareta to win by a nose with Siyouma and Andromeda Galaxy less than a length behind. The Wertheimers' racing manager Pierre-Charles Bureau called the winner "very brave" and nominated the Grand Prix de Saint-Cloud as a likely target, explaining his view that the filly would be better over a longer distance. The form of the race worked out well: Shareta won the Yorkshire Oaks and Prix Vermeille while Siyouma won the Sun Chariot Stakes.

After a break of two months, Solemia returned to finish fourth in the Prix de Pomone in August and then finished third to Shareta and Pirika in the Prix Vermeille. In the Prix de l'Arc de Triomphe, Solemia started at odds of 41/1 in a field of eighteen which had been weakened by the late withdrawals of Snow Fairy (injury), Danedream (travel restrictions) and Nathaniel (illness). The leading contenders included the Japanese Triple Crown winner Orfevre, The Derby winner Camelot and the improving filly Great Heavens. Peslier positioned Solemia just behind the leaders before taking the lead early in the straight. Orfevre moved past her and took a clear lead 200 metres from the finish but Solemia rallied to regain the lead in the last strides and won by a neck. After the race, Laffon-Parias praised Peslier's performance and admitted that he never expected the filly to win, saying that he had "hoped she might get a place". Solemia's success gave Peslier a record-equaling fourth success in the race, following Helissio (1996), Peintre Celebre (1997) and Sagamix (1998).

In November Solemia was sent to contest the Japan Cup at Tokyo Racecourse. She finished thirteenth of the seventeen runners behind the Japanese filly Gentildonna.

== Breeding record ==
After her run in Japan Solemia was retired from racing to become a broodmare. It was announced that she would be covered in 2013 by the stallion Dubawi at the Dalham Hall Stud.

== Pedigree ==
Pedigree of Solemia (IRE), bay filly, 2008
Sire Poliglote (GB) 1992	Sadler's Wells; 1981	Northern Dancer	Nearctic
Sire Poliglote (GB) 1992	Sadler's Wells; 1981	Northern Dancer	Natalma
Sire Poliglote (GB) 1992	Sadler's Wells; 1981	Fairy Bridge	Bold Reason
Sire Poliglote (GB) 1992	Sadler's Wells; 1981	Fairy Bridge	Special
Sire Poliglote (GB) 1992	Alexandrie; 1980	Val de l'Orne	Val de Loir
Sire Poliglote (GB) 1992	Alexandrie; 1980	Val de l'Orne	Aglae
Sire Poliglote (GB) 1992	Alexandrie; 1980	Apache	Sir Gaylord
Sire Poliglote (GB) 1992	Alexandrie; 1980	Apache	Americaine
Dam Brooklyn's Dance (FR) 1988	Shirley Heights; 1975	Mill Reef	Never Bend
Dam Brooklyn's Dance (FR) 1988	Shirley Heights; 1975	Mill Reef	Milan Mill
Dam Brooklyn's Dance (FR) 1988	Shirley Heights; 1975	Hardiemma	Hardicanute
Dam Brooklyn's Dance (FR) 1988	Shirley Heights; 1975	Hardiemma	Grand Cross
Dam Brooklyn's Dance (FR) 1988	Vallee Dansante; 1981	Lyphard	Northern Dancer
Dam Brooklyn's Dance (FR) 1988	Vallee Dansante; 1981	Lyphard	Goofed
Dam Brooklyn's Dance (FR) 1988	Vallee Dansante; 1981	Green Valley	Val de Loir
Dam Brooklyn's Dance (FR) 1988	Vallee Dansante; 1981	Green Valley	Sly Pola (Family: 16-c)

- Solemia is inbred 3 × 4 to Northern Dancer, meaning that the stallion appears in both the third and fourth generations of her pedigree. She is also inbred 4 × 4 to Val de Loir
