= Channel (horse) =

Irish-bred racehorse

- Racing silks of Samuel De Barros
- Sire: Nathaniel
- Grandsire: Galileo
- Dam: Love Magic
- Damsire: Dansili
- Sex: Mare
- Foaled: 17 April 2016
- Country: Ireland
- Colour: Bay
- Breeder: Kilcarn Stud
- Owner: Samuel De Barros
- Trainer: Francis-Henri Graffard
- Record: 6: 3-1-0
- Earnings: £544,955

Major wins
- Prix de Diane (2019)

Channel (foaled 17 April 2016) is an Irish-bred, French-trained Thoroughbred racehorse. As a three-year-old in 2019 she finished second on her debut and then won two minor races before recording her biggest success in the Group 1 Prix de Diane. She was well beaten in two subsequent races.

== Background ==
Channel is a bay mare with a white blaze and three white socks bred in Ireland by the County Meath-based Kilcarn Stud. As a yearling she was consigned to the Goffs Orby sale and bought for €18,000 by Meridian International. In the following May she returned to the sales ring at Deauville for the Arqana "breeze-up" sale in which horses are publicly galloped before being auctioned. She was sold for €70,000 to Bertrand le Metayer Bloodstock. The filly entered the ownership of Samuel De Barros and was sent into training with Francis-Henri Graffard.

She was from the third crop of foals sired by Nathaniel who won the King George VI and Queen Elizabeth Stakes in 2011 and the Eclipse Stakes in the following year. As a breeding stallion he is best known as the sire of Enable.

Channel's dam Love Magic showed modest racing ability, winning one minor race from five attempts. Love Magic's dam Magical Romance won the Cheveley Park Stakes and was a half-sister to Alexandrova as well as being closely related to Rekindling and Golden Sword.

== Racing career ==
=== 2019: three-year-old season ===
Having not raced as a two-year-old Channel made her debut in a maiden race over 2000 metres at Saint-Cloud Racecourse on 30 March 2019. Ridden by Ronan Thomas and starting at odds of 11/1 she finished second of the fourteen runners, beaten half a length by the André Fabre-trained Secret Walk. Pierre-Charles Boudot then took over as her regular jockey and rode her in all of her subsequent races. On 27 April she started odds-on favourite for a maiden over 2200 metres at Lyon Parilly Racecourse and recorded her first victory as she won "easily" by two lengths from Big Death after taking the lead 300 metres from the finish. Three weeks later Channel was stepped up in class for the Prix de la Chapelle-en-Serval over 2100 metres at Chantilly Racecourse and went off the 5.3/1 third choice in an eight-runner field. After being in contention from the start she went to the front 200 metres from the finish and won "very readily" by one and three quarter lengths from Ebony with the favourite Dariyza a head away in third place.

In the Group 1 Prix de Diane over 2100 metres at Chantilly a month later, Channel started the 9.3/1 third choice in the betting behind Siyarafina and Commes (runner-up in the Poule d'Essai des Pouliches). The other thirteen runners included Wonderment (Critérium de Saint-Cloud), Étoile (Prix Cléopâtre), Platane (Prix Vanteaux), Cartiem (Prix Penelope), Nausha (Musidora Stakes) and Cala Tarida (Prix des Réservoirs). Platane set the pace before giving way to Wonderment in the straight but Channel, who had been in contention from the start, moved up on the outside to gain the advantage approaching the last 200 metres. With several fillies producing strong late runs the race resulted in a blanket finish with Channel holding on to win by a head from Commes, just ahead of Grand Glory, Étoile, Cala Tarida and Siyarafina. After the race Boudot said "I was 80% sure we'd won passing the post but I can't say I was absolutely certain. I felt like I was ahead and that we'd won bar an unfortunate nod of the head. Once I knew we’d won it was a huge moment". Graffard commented "When I saw the way she accelerated and that nothing else was really coming after her, I knew she wouldn’t stop. I felt she would run all the way to the line and that's exactly what she did".

On 1 August Channel was sent to England and matched against older fillies and mares in the Nassau Stakes at Goodwood Racecourse. Starting at odds of 11/1 she ran well until the last three furlongs but then dropped away to come home seventh of the nine runners behind the Japanese mare Deirdre. Six weeks later the filly was stepped up in distance to contest the Prix Vermeille over 2400 metres at Longchamp Racecourse in which she never looked likely to win and finished sixth to Star Catcher, beaten four and a half lengths by the winner.

== Pedigree ==
Pedigree of Channel (IRE), bay filly, 2016
| Sire Nathaniel (IRE) 2008 | Galileo (IRE); 1998 | Sadler's Wells (USA) | Northern Dancer (CAN) |
| Sire Nathaniel (IRE) 2008 | Galileo (IRE); 1998 | Sadler's Wells (USA) | Fairy Bridge |
| Sire Nathaniel (IRE) 2008 | Galileo (IRE); 1998 | Urban Sea (USA) | Miswaki |
| Sire Nathaniel (IRE) 2008 | Galileo (IRE); 1998 | Urban Sea (USA) | Allegretta (GB) |
| Sire Nathaniel (IRE) 2008 | Magnificient Style (USA); 1993 | Silver Hawk | Roberto |
| Sire Nathaniel (IRE) 2008 | Magnificient Style (USA); 1993 | Silver Hawk | Gris Vitesse |
| Sire Nathaniel (IRE) 2008 | Magnificient Style (USA); 1993 | Mia Karina | Icecapade |
| Sire Nathaniel (IRE) 2008 | Magnificient Style (USA); 1993 | Mia Karina | Basin |
| Dam Love Magic (GB) 2010 | Dansili (GB); 1996 | Danehill (USA) | Danzig |
| Dam Love Magic (GB) 2010 | Dansili (GB); 1996 | Danehill (USA) | Razyana |
| Dam Love Magic (GB) 2010 | Dansili (GB); 1996 | Hasili (IRE) | Kahyasi |
| Dam Love Magic (GB) 2010 | Dansili (GB); 1996 | Hasili (IRE) | Kerali (GB) |
| Dam Love Magic (GB) 2010 | Magical Romance (GB); 2002 | Barathea | Sadler's Wells (USA) |
| Dam Love Magic (GB) 2010 | Magical Romance (GB); 2002 | Barathea | Brocade (GB) |
| Dam Love Magic (GB) 2010 | Magical Romance (GB); 2002 | Shouk (GB) | Shirley Heights |
| Dam Love Magic (GB) 2010 | Magical Romance (GB); 2002 | Shouk (GB) | Souk (IRE) (Family: 21-a) |
