= Mutafaweq =

British-bred Thoroughbred racehorse

- Sire: Silver Hawk
- Grandsire: Roberto
- Dam: The Caretaker
- Damsire: Caerleon
- Sex: Stallion
- Foaled: 21 February 1996
- Country: Great Britain
- Colour: Bay
- Breeder: Murifield Ventures & Jayeff B Stables
- Owner: Godolphin Racing
- Trainer: Saeed bin Suroor
- Record: 19: 7-1-3
- Earnings: £971,449

Major wins
- King Edward VII Stakes (1999); St. Leger Stakes (1999); Deutschland-Preis (2000); Canadian International (2000); Coronation Cup (2001)

Mutafaweq (foaled 21 February 1996 in Kentucky) is a Thoroughbred racehorse who raced successfully in England, Germany, and Canada.

== Background ==
Mutafaweq was a bay horse with no white markings bred in Kentucky by Muirfield Ventures & Jayeff B Stables. He was sired by Silver Hawk, an American-bred colt who finished third in the 1982 Epsom Derby and later became a successful breeding stallion, siring the 1997 Epsom Derby winner Benny the Dip. Mutafaweq's dam The Caretaker was a successful racehorse who won several races including the valuable Cartier Million in 1989.

In August 1997, Mutafaweq was offered for sale at Saratoga and was bought for $310,000 by Hamdan Al Maktoum's Shadwell Estate. The colt was sent to Europe where he entered the ownership of Godolphin Racing and was trained by Saeed bin Suroor.

== Racing career ==
=== 1998: two-year-old season ===
Mutafaweq began his racing career in a one-mile maiden race at Yarmouth Racecourse on 17 September in which he was ridden by Daragh O'Donohoe and started the 7/4 favourite. He started slowly but kept on in the closing stages to finish second of the thirteen runners, beaten two lengths Mutamakin. Frankie Dettori took over the ride when the colt started 13/8 favourite for a twenty-three runner maiden at Newmarket Racecourse four weeks later. He took the lead a quarter of a mile from the finish and rallied after being overtaken a furlong out to win by a length from the Michael Stoute-trained Biennale.

=== 1999: three-year-old season ===
On his debut as a three-year-old, Mutafaweq started 5/6 favourite for a race over 10 1/2 furlongs at Doncaster Racecourse and won by three lengths from Tissifer, having taken the lead early in the straight. The colt was then moved up in class and distance to contest the Group Two King Edward VII Stakes at Royal Ascot on 18 June. Ridden by Dettori, he started 4/1 favourite against Housemaster (fourth in The Derby), Iscan (runner-up in the Derby Italiano), Manndar (Fairway Stakes), Red Sea (Coventry Stakes) and Peshtigo (Chester Vase). Mutafaweq took an early lead but was then restrained by Dettori and raced in fourth place until the straight. He took the lead two furlongs out and went clear in the closing stages to win by two lengths and one and a quarter lengths from Iscan and Red Sea. The colt was stepped up again to contest the Irish Derby at the Curragh nine days later and finished fifth of the ten runners, more than fifteen lengths behind the winner Montjeu. In August, Mutafaweq started 3/1 favourite for the Great Voltigeur Stakes at York Racecourse, but finished fourth of the seven runners behind Fantastic Light, Bienamado and Glamis.

At Doncaster on 11 September, Mutafaweq started the 11/2 second favourite for the 223rd running of the St Leger Stakes. The Henry Cecil-trained filly Ramruma, winner of The Oaks, Irish Oaks and Yorkshire Oaks started the 10/11 favourite, whilst the other runners included Iscan and Noushkey, runner-up to Ramruma in the Epsom Oaks and winner of the Lancashire Oaks. Ridden by Richard Hills, Mutafaweq tracked the leaders before taking the lead two furlongs from the finish. He edged to the left in the closing stages, slightly hampering Ramruna, but stayed on to beat the filly by two lengths with Adair two lengths further back in third.

=== 2000: four-year-old season ===
Mutafaweq began his third season by finishing third behind Montjeu and Greek Dance in the Tattersalls Gold Cup at the Curragh on 28 May. He then started second favourite for the Hardwicke Stakes at Royal Ascot, but finished seventh of the nine runners behind Fruits of Love, weakening in the straight after running prominently in the early stages. One month later, Mutafaweq was sent to Germany and started 6/4 favourite for the Deutschland-Preis over 2400 metres at Düsseldorf. Ridden by Hills, he took third place in the straight and overtook Quezon City inside the final 200 metres to in by three-quarters of a length.

Mutafaweq returned to Germany for the Grosser Preis von Baden in September, but finished eighth of the eleven runners, twenty-three lengths behind the winner Samum. Dettori regained the ride on Mutafaweq when the colt started 11/4 favourite for the Irish St. Leger at the Curragh two weeks later. He moved into third place early in the straight, but made no further progress and was beaten 1 1/2 lengths and 6 lengths by Arctic Owl and Yavana's Pace. On his final appearance of the season, Mutafaweq was sent to Woodbine Racetrack in Toronto to contest the Canadian International Stakes. He started the 4/1 second favourite behind the Coronation Cup winner Daliapour, with the other runners including Caitano (Aral-Pokal, Gran Premio del Jockey Club), Lycitus (Prix du Lys) and Murghem (Geoffrey Freer Stakes). Dettori settled the colt in fifth place before moving up on the outside on the turn into the straight. He took a narrow lead a furlong and a half from the finish and rallied after being overtaken by Williams News to take the lead in the final stride and win by a nose, with a gap of two and three quarter lengths back to Daliapour in third.

=== 2001: five-year-old season ===
For his first appearance as five-year-old Mutafaweq was sent to Dubai to contest the Dubai Sheema Classic at Nad Al Sheba Racecourse but made little impact, finishing eighth of the sixteen runners behind the Japanese runner Stay Gold.

On his return to Europe, the horse ran in the Coronation Cup at Epsom Downs Racecourse on 8 June. Ridden by Dettori, he was the 11/2 fourth choice in the betting behind the classic winners Millenary and Petrushka and the St Simon Stakes winner Wellbeing. Mutafaweq took the lead from the start and set a steady pace before accelerating three furlongs from the finish. Wellbeing emerged as his only serious challenger, but after a sustained struggle over the final furlong, Mutafaweq prevailed by a short head to record his fourth win at the highest level, with a gap of four lengths back to Millenary in third place. Two weeks later, Mutafaweq conceded five pounds to Wellbeing, and five other opponents, in his second attempt to win the Hardwicke Stakes. He was among the leaders from the start, but was unable to quicken in the closing stages and finished third behind Sandmason and Zindabad. In August, Mutafaweq was sent back to Germany for the Group One Credit Suisse Private Banking Pokal and started the 7/5 favourite but after racing in third he dropped away in the closing stages and finished last of the eight runners behind Sabiango.

In September, Mutafaweq was sent to race in the United States but had little success in two runs at Belmont Park. Ridden by Jerry Bailey he stumbled on the first bend in the Man o' War Stakes and never looked likely to win, finishing last behind With Anticipation. Pat Day took over the ride when the horse ran in the Turf Classic Invitational Stakes but there was no improvement in performance as Mutafaweq finished last of the six runners behind Timboroa.

== Stud record ==
Mutafaweq was retired from racing at the end of his 2001 campaign. He was sent to serve stallion duty at Wood Farm Stud in Shropshire, England but in 2002 was sent to a breeding operation in Japan.

== Pedigree ==
Pedigree of Mutafaweq
| Sire Silver Hawk (USA) 1979 | Roberto (USA); 1969 | Hail To Reason | Turn-To |
| Sire Silver Hawk (USA) 1979 | Roberto (USA); 1969 | Hail To Reason | Nothirdchance |
| Sire Silver Hawk (USA) 1979 | Roberto (USA); 1969 | Bramalea | Nashua |
| Sire Silver Hawk (USA) 1979 | Roberto (USA); 1969 | Bramalea | Rarelea |
| Sire Silver Hawk (USA) 1979 | Gris Vitesse (USA); 1966 | Amerigo | Nearco |
| Sire Silver Hawk (USA) 1979 | Gris Vitesse (USA); 1966 | Amerigo | Sanlinea |
| Sire Silver Hawk (USA) 1979 | Gris Vitesse (USA); 1966 | Matchiche | Mat de Cocagne |
| Sire Silver Hawk (USA) 1979 | Gris Vitesse (USA); 1966 | Matchiche | Chimere Fabuleuse |
| Dam The Caretaker (IRE) 1987 | Caerleon (USA); 1980 | Nijinsky | Northern Dancer |
| Dam The Caretaker (IRE) 1987 | Caerleon (USA); 1980 | Nijinsky | Flaming Page |
| Dam The Caretaker (IRE) 1987 | Caerleon (USA); 1980 | Foreseer | Round Table |
| Dam The Caretaker (IRE) 1987 | Caerleon (USA); 1980 | Foreseer | Regal Gleam |
| Dam The Caretaker (IRE) 1987 | Go Feather Go (USA); 1972 | Go Marching | Princequillo |
| Dam The Caretaker (IRE) 1987 | Go Feather Go (USA); 1972 | Go Marching | Leallah |
| Dam The Caretaker (IRE) 1987 | Go Feather Go (USA); 1972 | Feather Bed | Johns Joy |
| Dam The Caretaker (IRE) 1987 | Go Feather Go (USA); 1972 | Feather Bed | Silly Sarah (Family 2-s) |
