= 1997 Epsom Derby =

- Location: Epsom Downs Racecourse
- Date: 7 June 1997
- Winning horse: Benny the Dip
- Starting price: 11/1
- Jockey: Willie Ryan
- Trainer: John Gosden
- Owner: Charles Landon Knight II & Claiborne Farm

Epsom Derby 1997
1-2-3
Benny The Dip	Silver Patriarch	Romanov

Also Ran
4-5-6
Entrepreneur	The Fly	Fahris
7-8-9
Symonds Inn	Musalsal	Bold Demand
10-11-12
Cloudings	Single Empire	Crystal Hearted
13
Papua	13 Ran	2m 35.77s

The 1997 Epsom Derby was a horse race which took place at Epsom Downs on Saturday 7 June 1997. It was the 218th running of the Derby, and it was won by Benny the Dip. The winner was ridden by Willie Ryan and trained by John Gosden. The pre-race favourite Entrepreneur finished fourth.

== Race details ==
- Sponsor: Vodafone
- Winner's prize money: £595,250
- Going: Good
- Number of runners: 13
- Winner's time: 2m 35.77s

== Full result ==
	*	Horse	Jockey	Trainer ^{†}	SP
1		Benny the Dip	Willie Ryan	John Gosden	11/1
2	shd	Silver Patriarch	Pat Eddery	John Dunlop	6/1
3	5	Romanov	John Reid	Peter Chapple-Hyam	25/1
4	3½	Entrepreneur	Michael Kinane	Michael Stoute	4/6 fav
5	3	The Fly	Ray Cochrane	Barry Hills	12/1
6	1	Fahris	Richard Hills	Ben Hanbury	12/1
7	4	Symonds Inn	Kieren Fallon	Jimmy FitzGerald	33/1
8	3½	Musalsal	Michael Hills	Barry Hills	40/1
9	5	Bold Demand	Frankie Dettori	Saeed bin Suroor	20/1
10	12	Cloudings	Olivier Peslier	André Fabre (FR)	12/1
11	1¼	Single Empire	David Harrison	Peter Chapple-Hyam	33/1
12	3½	Crystal Hearted	Tony McGlone	Henry Candy	66/1
13	5	Papua	Gary Carter	Ian Balding	150/1

* The distances between the horses are shown in lengths or shorter. shd = short-head.
† Trainers are based in Great Britain unless indicated.

== Winner's details ==
Winner's racing colours

Further details of the winner, Benny the Dip:

- Foaled: March 25, 1994, in Kentucky, USA
- Sire: Silver Hawk; Dam: Rascal Rascal (Ack Ack)
- Owner: Landon Knight and Claiborne Farm
- Breeder: Landon Knight
- Rating in 1997 International Classifications: 126

== Form analysis ==
=== Two-year-old races ===
Notable runs by the future Derby participants as two-year-olds in 1996.

- Benny the Dip – 1st Royal Lodge Stakes, 3rd Racing Post Trophy
- Silver Patriarch – 1st Zetland Stakes
- Fahris – 2nd Silver Tankard Stakes
- Symonds Inn – 2nd Acomb Stakes, 3rd Silver Tankard Stakes
- Papua – 5th Racing Post Trophy

=== The road to Epsom ===
Early-season appearances in 1997 and trial races prior to running in the Derby.

- Benny the Dip – 2nd Sandown Classic Trial, 1st Dante Stakes
- Silver Patriarch – 3rd Sandown Classic Trial, 1st Lingfield Derby Trial
- Romanov – 3rd Irish 2,000 Guineas
- Entrepreneur – 1st 2,000 Guineas
- Fahris – 1st Feilden Stakes
- Symonds Inn – 1st Glasgow Stakes
- Mulsalsal – 3rd Dante Stakes
- Cloudings – 1st Prix de Courcelles, 1st Prix Lupin
- Single Empire – 1st Derby Italiano
- Crystal Hearted – 5th Easter Stakes, 1st Dee Stakes
- Papua – 3rd Easter Stakes, 2nd Blue Riband Trial Stakes, 4th Lingfield Derby Trial

=== Subsequent Group 1 wins ===
Group 1 / Grade I victories after running in the Derby.

- Silver Patriarch – St. Leger (1997), Coronation Cup (1998), Gran Premio del Jockey Club (1998)
- Single Empire – San Juan Capistrano Invitational Handicap (1999)

== Subsequent breeding careers ==
Leading progeny of participants in the 1997 Epsom Derby.

=== Sires of Classic winners ===
Entrepreneur (4th) - Shuttled to New Zealand, exported to Japan, exported to Russia

- Vintage Tipple - 1st Irish Oaks (2003)
- Damson - 1st Phoenix Stakes (2004)
- Berenson - 2nd National Stakes (2004)
- Marie Vision - Dam of The Grey Gatsby

=== Sires of National Hunt horses ===
Cloudings (10th)

- Many Clouds - 1st Grand National (2015)
- Cloudy Dream - 1st Future Champion Novices' Chase (2017)
- Cloudy Lane - 1st Peter Marsh Chase (2009)
- Cloudy Too - 1st Peter Marsh Chase (2016)

Silver Patriarch (2nd)

- Silver By Nature - 1st Grand National Trial (2010, 2011)
- Carrickboy - 1st Byrne Group Plate (2013)
- Kentford Grey Lady - 3rd Cleeve Hurdle (2013)
- Rimsky - 1st Persian War Novices' Hurdle (2005)

Benny The Dip (1st) - Exported to America before standing in England

- Benny Be Good - 2nd "Fixed Brush" Handicap Hurdle (2011)
- Unleash - 2nd Martell Cognac Beefeater Restaurants Handicap Hurdle (2004)

=== Other Stallions ===
Romanov (3rd) - Exported to America - Exported to Argentina
Fahris (6th) - Fahrisee (three time jumps winner)
Musalsal (8th) - Exported to Cyprus
Bold Demand (9th) - Exported to Saudi Arabia
Single Empire (11th) - Exported to Italy
