= Fillies' Sprint Stakes =

Flat horse race in Ireland

- Class: Group 3
- Location: Naas Racecourse; County Kildare, Ireland
- Inaugurated: 2002
- Race type: Flat / Thoroughbred
- Sponsor: Coolmore Stud
- Website: naasracecourse.com

Race information
- Distance: 6f (1,207 metres)
- Surface: Turf
- Track: Straight
- Qualification: Two-year-old fillies
- Weight: 9 st 2 lb Penalties; 3 lb for Listed winners
- Purse: €68,000 (2021); 1st: €40,120

Fillies' Sprint Stakes
2026
Victorious	Controlla	Dancing Destiny

Previous years
2025
Lady Iman	Green Sense	Signora
2024
Fairy Godmother	Sparkling Sea	California Dreamer
2023
Porta Fortuna	Navassa Island	Launch
2022
Meditate	Comhra	It's Showtime Baby
2021
Hermana Estrella	Quick Suzy	Missing Matron

2020-2011
2020
Mother Earth	Sussex Garden	Give Her A Squeeze
2019
Etoile	Peace Charter	Celtic Beauty
2018
Servalan	Chicas Amigas	Skitter Scatter
2017
Alpha Centauri	Actress	Shapes
2016
Cuff	Yulong Baobei	Seafront
2015
Great Page	Special Focus	Promised Money
2014
Beach Belle	Realtra	Stormfly
2013
Sandiva	Heart Focus	Fig Roll
2012
Sky Lantern	True Verdict	Liberating
2011
Teolane	Princess Sinead	Naseem Sea

2010-2002
2010
Radharcnafarraige	Emerald Ring	Juliet Capulet
2009
Lillie Langtry	Kitty Kiernan	A Mind Of Her Own
2008
Cuis Ghaire	Marquesa	Undaunted Affair
2007
You'resothrilling	Saoirse Abu	May Day Queen
2006
Brazilian Bride	Gee Kel	Amber Valley
2005
Rumplestiltskin	Waterways	Sandie
2004
Damson	Pictavia	Umniya
2003
Miss Childrey	Little Whisper	Letsimpress
2002
Rag Top	Luminata	Tus Maith

The Fillies' Sprint Stakes is a Group 3 flat horse race in Ireland open to two-year-old thoroughbred fillies. It is run at Naas over a distance of 6 furlongs (1,207 metres), and it is scheduled to take place each year in May or June.

== History ==
The event was established in 2002, and it was originally sponsored by Swordlestown Stud. It initially held Listed status, and was promoted to Group 3 level in 2006.

The 2008 edition was run in memory of Cathal Ryan, the former owner of Swordlestown Stud. The sponsorship was taken over by Coolmore Stud in 2009.

The Fillies' Sprint Stakes was relegated back to Listed level in 2011 but regained Group 3 status in 2019.

== Records ==
Leading jockey (4 wins):

- Seamie Heffernan - Miss Childrey (2003), You'resothrilling (2007), Servalan (2018), Etoile (2019)

Leading trainer (9 wins):

- Aidan O'Brien – Rumplestiltskin (2005), You'resothrilling (2007), Lillie Langtry (2009), Cuff (2016), Etoile (2019), Mother Earth (2020), Meditate (2022), Fairy Godmother (2024), Victorious (2026)

== Winners ==
Year	Winner	Jockey	Trainer	Time
2002	Rag Top	Dane O'Neill	Richard Hannon Sr.	1:18.80
2003	Miss Childrey	Seamie Heffernan	Francis Ennis	1:13.90
2004	Damson	Jamie Spencer	David Wachman	1:10.80
2005	Rumplestiltskin	Kieren Fallon	Aidan O'Brien	1:10.20
2006	Brazilian Bride	Declan McDonogh	Kevin Prendergast	1:09.80
2007	You'resothrilling	Seamie Heffernan	Aidan O'Brien	1:10.40
2008	Cuis Ghaire	Kevin Manning	Jim Bolger	1:09.32
2009	Lillie Langtry	Johnny Murtagh	Aidan O'Brien	1:10.34
2010	Radharcnafarraige	Kevin Manning	Jim Bolger	1:10.43
2011	Teolane	Kevin Manning	Jim Bolger	1:11.56
2012	Sky Lantern	Richard Hughes	Richard Hannon Sr.	1:11.56
2013	Sandiva	Pat Smullen	Richard Fahey	1:10.26
2014	Beach Belle	Chris Hayes	Kevin Prendergast	1:12.37
2015	Great Page	Sean Levey	Richard Hannon Jr.	1:17.63
2016	Cuff	Ryan Moore	Aidan O'Brien	1:11.33
2017	Alpha Centauri	Colm O'Donoghue	Jessica Harrington	1:13.53
2018	Servalan	Seamie Heffernan	Jessica Harrington	1:13.17
2019	Etoile	Seamie Heffernan	Aidan O'Brien	1:12.00
2020	Mother Earth (Note: The 2020 race was run in July due to the COVID-19 pandemic in the Republic of Ireland)	Wayne Lordan	Aidan O'Brien	1:13.38
2021	Hermana Estrella	Chris Hayes	Fozzy Stack	1:13.73
2022	Meditate	Wayne Lordan	Aidan O'Brien	1:11.41
2023	Porta Fortuna	Gavin Ryan	Donnacha O'Brien	1:09.99
2024	Fairy Godmother	Ryan Moore	Aidan O'Brien	1:09.92
2025	Lady Iman	Colin Keane	Ger Lyons	1:10.19
2026	Victorious	Ryan Moore	Aidan O'Brien	1:12:41

== See also ==
- Horse racing in Ireland
- List of Irish flat horse races

== Sources ==
- Racing Post:
  - 2002, 2003, 2004, 2005, 2006, 2007, 2008, 2009, 2010, 2011
  - 2012, 2013, 2014, 2015, 2016, 2017, 2018, 2019, 2020, 2021
  - 2022, 2023, 2024, 2025
- galopp-sieger.de – Cathal Ryan Memorial Sprint Stakes.
- horseracingintfed.com – International Federation of Horseracing Authorities – Fillies' Sprint Stakes (2010).
- pedigreequery.com – Swordlestown Stud Sprint Stakes – Naas.
