= Robert Winston (jockey) =

Irish jockey

Personal information
- Born: 28 November 1979 (age 46) Finglas, Dublin, Ireland
- Occupation: Jockey

Horse racing career
- Sport: Horse racing

Major racing wins
- Major races British Champions Sprint (2017); Cheveley Park Stakes (2004)

Racing awards
- Lester Award for Flat Ride of the Year (2016)

Significant horses
- Librisa Breeze, Magical Romance

Robert Francis Winston (born 28 November 1979) is an Irish jockey who competes in Flat racing.

== Biography ==
He won the Group 1 Cheveley Park Stakes on Magical Romance in 2004. In 2016, he won the Lester Award for flat ride of the year. After a gap of thirteen years, he added a second Group 1 victory in the 2017 British Champions Sprint Stakes at Ascot on Librisa Breeze, the biggest win of his career.

Winston retired in September 2019, having ridden 1,627 winners in Britain over his 23-year career In September 2021 he came out of retirement to resume his career and rode his first winner since retirement on 11 October 2021.

== Major wins ==
(United Kingdom) Great Britain

- British Champions Sprint Stakes – Librisa Breeze (2017)
- Cheveley Park Stakes – Magical Romance (2004)
