= Damson (horse) =

Irish-bred Thoroughbred racehorse

- Sire: Entrepreneur
- Grandsire: Sadler's Wells
- Dam: Tadkiyra
- Damsire: Darshaan
- Sex: Mare
- Foaled: 21 April 2002
- Country: Ireland
- Colour: Bay
- Breeder: Epona Bloodstock Ltd
- Owner: Susan Magnier & Michael Tabor
- Trainer: David Wachman
- Record: 8: 4-0-1
- Earnings: £235,456

Major wins
- Fillies' Sprint Stakes (2004); Queen Mary Stakes (2004); Phoenix Stakes (2004)

Awards
- Top-rated Irish 2-y-o filly (2004)

Damson (foaled 21 April 2002) is an Irish Thoroughbred racehorse and broodmare. She showed her best form as a two-year-old in 2004 when she was unbeaten in her first four races including the Fillies' Sprint Stakes, Queen Mary Stakes and Phoenix Stakes. On her only subsequent start that year she finished third in the Cheveley Park Stakes. At the end of the year she was rated the second-best filly of her generation in Europe. She failed to reproduce her juvenile form in three starts as a three-year-old in 2005 and was retired from racing. She has had some success as a broodmare.

== Background ==
Damson is a dark bay mare with a narrow, interrupted white stripe bred in Ireland by Epona Bloodstock Ltd. As a yearling in October 2003 she was consigned to the Goff's sale and was bought for €160,000 by the trainer David Wachman. Wachman is the son-in-law of the Coolmore Stud's John Magnier. Like many Coolmore horses the details of the filly's ownership changed from race to race: she sometimes raced in the colours of Susan Magnier, while on others she was described as the property of a partnership between Magnier and Michael Tabor.

She was one of the best horses sired by Entrepreneur who won the 2000 Guineas in 1997. He was not a great success as a breeding stallion and was exported to Japan in 2002. Her dam Tadkiyra produced several other winners including the Prestige Stakes winner Geminiani. She was a granddaughter of Tonnera (Prix Saint-Alary) who was in turn a daughter of the outstanding sprinter Texana (Prix de l'Abbaye).

== Racing career ==
=== 2004: two-year-old season ===
Damson began her racing career in a maiden race over five furlongs at Cork Racecourse on 12 April in which she started at odds of 5/1 in a five-runner field. Ridden by Jamie Spencer she took the lead approaching the final furlong and won by two lengths from The Quiet Woman. At Naas Racecourse on 7 June the filly was stepped up in class for the Listed Fillies' Sprint Stakes and started 15/8 second favourite behind the Jim Bolger-trained Pictavia. Spencer sent her into the lead in the last quarter mile and she quickly opened up a clear lead before being eased down to win "comfortably" by two lengths. Nine day after her win at Naas, Damson was sent to England for the Group 3 Queen Mary Stakes at Royal Ascot and started the 11/2 joint favourite alongside the James Fanshawe-trained Soar. Spencer restrained the filly before making rapid progress in the last quarter mile. She took the lead a furlong out and drew away in "impressive" fashion to win by three lengths from Soar. Spencer commented "She won so easily at Naas I thought she would go really well here today... when I asked her to go she went through the pack so quickly I nearly crashed into something else. It was a great adrenaline rush when we got into the clear".

Kieren Fallon took over from Spencer when Damson was moved up to Group 1 class and matched against male opposition i the Phoenix Stakes at the Curragh on 8 August. She was made the 8/11 favourite in a six-runner field with the best of her opponents appearing to be the Aidan O'Brien-trained colts Russian Blue (Marble Hill Stakes) and Oratorio. After racing in third place behind Russian Blue, Damson moved up to take the lead entering the final furlong and kept on well to win by three quarters of a length from Oratorio. Her victory gave Wachman his first success at the highest level and was the first for a filly in the race since Eva Luna (IRE) won in 1994. After the race Wachman said "She's so switched off. Kieren said it is only a matter of pressing the button. She seems to be so relaxed in behind horses. It's a big relief to have that over with and we'll think about the Cheveley Park now. We'll also consider the Moyglare. She's smart, but as soon as she hits the front she idles".

For her final appearance of the season Damson was sent to England for a second time and started odds-on favourite for the Cheveley Park Stakes at Newmarket Racecourse on 30 September. She sustained her first defeat as she came home third in a "blanket finish" beaten half a length by the winner Magical Romance. Wachman offered no excuses saying "She just did not go through the final furlong after coming with a run that made it look as if she could win. I am sure it was not the distance, so maybe it is just the end of a long season for her".

In the International Classification for 2004 Damson was rated the best two-year-old filly trained in Ireland and the second best female of her generation on Europe behind Divine Proportions.

=== 2005: three-year-old season ===
Damson was the ante-post favourite for the 1000 Guineas but was withdrawn four days before the race after a "bad reaction" following a workout at Newmarket. Wachman commented "it's disappointing for all concerned but it's not the end of the world". The filly made her three-year-old debut on 22 May at the Curragh in the Irish 1,000 Guineas. She briefly took the lead in the straight before fading to finish ninth behind Saoire. In the Coronation Stakes (run that year at York) she was made 7/2 favourite but came home seventh of the ten runners in a race won by Maids Causeway. After two races over one mile Damson was dropped back in distance for the Sprint Stakes over six furlongs at the Curragh on 7 August. After being restrained towards the rear of the field she moved up into second place but faded badly in final furlong and finished ninth.

On 29 August 2005 it was announced that Damson would not race again. Wachman said "Maybe she was slightly unlucky in the spring when she couldn't run in the Guineas but that doesn't matter now. She won a Group 1, a Group 3 and a Listed so I only wish I had a few more like her".

== Breeding record ==
After her retirement from racing Damson became a broodmare for Liberty Bloodstock, a breeding company associated with the Coolmore Stud. She has produced nine foals and four winners.

- Barbadine, a brown filly, foaled in 2007, sired by Giant's Causeway. Won two races.
- Compelling, bay filly, 2008, by Kingmambo. Won one race. Dam of Last Kingdom (Prix Daphnis).
- Requinto, bay colt, 2009, Dansili. Won four races including the Molecomb Stakes and Flying Childers Stakes.
- Substantivo, bay colt (later gelded), 2010, Duke of Marmalade. Failed to win in 19 races.
- Little Fastnet, bay filly, 2011, by Fastnet Rock. Failed to win in six races.
- Black Wolf Run, bay colt (gelded), 2012, by Danehill Dancer. Failed to win in 19 races.
- Independence Day, bay colt, 2013, by Dansili. Won one race, second in the Curragh Stakes.
- Filia, bay filly, 2014, by Fastnet Rock
- L'Explora, bay filly, 2015, by War Front

== Pedigree ==
Pedigree of Damson (IRE), bay mare, 2002
Sire Entrepreneur (GB) 1994	Sadler's Wells (USA); 1981	Northern Dancer	Nearctic
Sire Entrepreneur (GB) 1994	Sadler's Wells (USA); 1981	Northern Dancer	Natalma
Sire Entrepreneur (GB) 1994	Sadler's Wells (USA); 1981	Fairy Bridge	Bold Reason
Sire Entrepreneur (GB) 1994	Sadler's Wells (USA); 1981	Fairy Bridge	Special
Sire Entrepreneur (GB) 1994	Exclusive Order (USA); 1979	Exclusive Native	Raise a Native
Sire Entrepreneur (GB) 1994	Exclusive Order (USA); 1979	Exclusive Native	Exclusive
Sire Entrepreneur (GB) 1994	Exclusive Order (USA); 1979	Bonavista	Dead Ahead
Sire Entrepreneur (GB) 1994	Exclusive Order (USA); 1979	Bonavista	Ribotina
Dam Tadkiyra (IRE) 1989	Darshaan (GB); 1981	Shirley Heights	Mill Reef
Dam Tadkiyra (IRE) 1989	Darshaan (GB); 1981	Shirley Heights	Hardiemma
Dam Tadkiyra (IRE) 1989	Darshaan (GB); 1981	Delsy	Abdos
Dam Tadkiyra (IRE) 1989	Darshaan (GB); 1981	Delsy	Kelty
Dam Tadkiyra (IRE) 1989	Tremogia (FR); 1971	Silver Shark	Buisson Ardent
Dam Tadkiyra (IRE) 1989	Tremogia (FR); 1971	Silver Shark	Palsaka
Dam Tadkiyra (IRE) 1989	Tremogia (FR); 1971	Tonnera	Wild Risk
Dam Tadkiyra (IRE) 1989	Tremogia (FR); 1971	Tonnera	Texana (Family 5-b)
