= 2012 Prix de l'Arc de Triomphe =

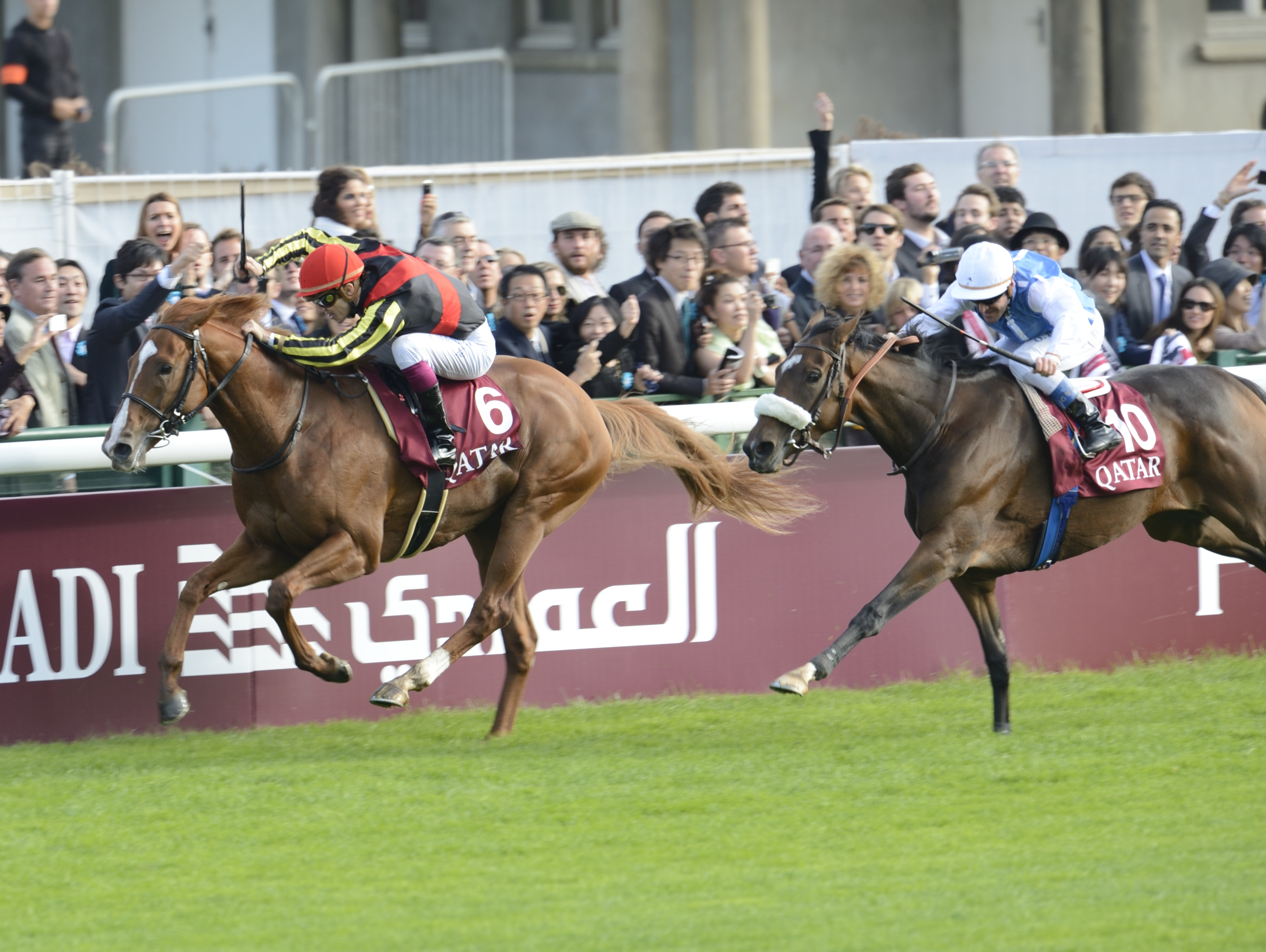
- Solemia (right) passing Orfevre (left) as they are about to pass the goal
- Location: Longchamp Racecourse
- Date: October 7, 2012
- Winning horse: Solemia

The 2012 Prix de l'Arc de Triomphe was a horse race held at Longchamp on Sunday 7 October 2012. It was the 91st running of the Prix de l'Arc de Triomphe.

The winner was Solemia, a four-year-old filly trained in France by Carlos Laffon-Parias. The winning jockey was Olivier Peslier.

In the closing stages of the race, Orfevre seemed likely to become the first winner of the event for Japan. But Solemia, an outsider in the betting, passed the leader in the home straight.

== Race details ==
- Sponsor: Qatar Racing and Equestrian Club
- Purse: €4,000,000; First prize: €2,285,600
- Going: Heavy
- Distance: 2,400 metres
- Number of runners: 18
- Winner's time: 2m 37.68s

== Full result ==
Pos.	Marg.	Horse	Age	Jockey	Trainer (Country)
1		Solemia	4	Olivier Peslier	Carlos Laffon-Parias (FR)
2	nk	Orfevre	4	Christophe Soumillon	Yasutoshi Ikee (JPN)
3	7	Masterstroke	3	Mickael Barzalona	André Fabre (FR)
4	1	Haya Landa	4	Franck Blondel	Sylvie Audon (FR)
5	½	Yellow and Green	3	Thierry Thulliez	Nicolas Clément (FR)
6	2½	Great Heavens	3	William Buick	John Gosden (GB)
7	1	Camelot	3	Frankie Dettori	Aidan O'Brien (IRE)
8	nse	Sea Moon	4	Ryan Moore	Sir Michael Stoute (GB)
9	hd	Shareta	4	Christophe Lemaire	Alain de Royer-Dupré (FR)
10	2½	Bayrir	3	Gérald Mossé	Alain de Royer-Dupré (FR)
11	nk	St Nicholas Abbey	5	Joseph O'Brien	Aidan O'Brien (IRE)
12	2½	Meandre	4	Maxime Guyon	André Fabre (FR)
13	2	Kesampour	3	Gregory Benoist	Mikel Delzangles (FR)
14	dist	Mikhail Glinka	5	Mirco Demuro	Arslangirej Savujev (CZE)
15	7	Saonois	3	Antoine Hamelin	Jean-Pierre Gauvin (FR)
16	4	Ernest Hemingway	3	Colm O'Donoghue	Aidan O'Brien (IRE)
17	dist	Aventino	8	Anthony Crastus	Yasutoshi Ikee (JPN)
18	12	Robin Hood	4	Seamie Heffernan	Aidan O'Brien (IRE)

- Abbreviations: nse = nose; nk = neck; hd = head; dist = distance

== Winner's details ==
Further details of the winner, Solemia.

- Sex: Filly
- Foaled: 20 February 2008
- Country: Ireland
- Sire: Poliglote; Dam: Brooklyn's Dance (Shirley Heights)
- Owner: Wertheimer et Frère
- Breeder: Wertheimer et Frère

== Subsequent breeding careers ==
Leading progeny of participants in the 2012 Prix de l'Arc de Triomphe.

=== Sires of Classic winners ===
Orfevre (2nd)

- Epoca d'Oro - 1st Satsuki Shō (2018)
- Lucky Lilac - 1st Queen Elizabeth II Cup (2019)
- Authority - 1st Aoba Sho (2020)
- Gilded Mirror - 3rd NHK Mile Cup (2020)
- Juryoku Pierrot - 1st Yushun Himba (2026)

Camelot (7th)

- Latrobe - 1st Irish Derby (2018)
- Even So - 1st Irish Oaks (2020)
- Athena - 1st Belmont Oaks (2018)
- Sir Erec - 1st Spring Juvenile Hurdle (2019)

=== Other Stallions ===
Orfevre (2nd) - Marche Lorraine - (1st BC Distaff 2021), Ushba Tesoro - (1st Dubai World Cup 2023)
Masterstroke (3rd) - Floridee - (1st Prix Bournosienne 2018)
Saonois (15th) - Minor flat and jumps winners
Sea Moon (8th) - Minor flat runner
Meandre (12th) - Exported to Czech Republic
Mikhail Glinka (14th) - Exported to Czech Republic

=== Broodmares ===
Great Heavens (6th) - Dubhe - Listed class handicapper
Solemia (1st) - Internaute - Listed Winner, G2&3 Placed, now a Sire
Haya Landa (4th) - Minor winner in Japan
Yellow And Green (5th) - Minor flat winner
Shareta (9th) - Minor flat runners
