= Agnes Keyser Fillies' Stakes =

Flat horse race in Britain

Abingdon Stakes
2026
Venetia	Lady Dora Mae	Della Pace

Previous years
2025
Waardah	Anna Swan	Tattycoram
2024
Lava Stream	Bolsena	Nakheel
2023
Al Asifah	Empress Wu	Sumo Sam
2022
Stay Alert	Golden Lyra	Luna Dorada
2021
Creative Flair	Lilac Road	Vesela

2020-2011
2020
Cabaletta	Chamade	Wonderful Tonight
2019
Antonia De Vega	Star Terms	Terebellum
2018
Sea of Class	Mrs Sippy	Princess Yaiza
2017
Elas Ruby	Ebbesbourne	Smart Together
2016
Abingdon	Beauly	Snow Moon
2015
Speedy Boarding	Hot Sauce	Jasmine Blue
2014
Eastern Belle	Pelerin	Queen Of Ice
2013
Cruck Realta	Spicy Dal	Lady Nouf
2012
Great Heavens	Miss Cato	Albamara
2011
Rumh	Imperial Pippin	Moment of Time

2010-2001
2010
Eleanora Duse	Pink Symphony	Shimmering Surf
2009
Splashdown	Apple Charlotte	Fallen In Love
2008
Rosa Grace	Melodramatic	Annie Skates
2007
Darrfonah	Russian Rosie	Majounes Song
2006
Princess Nada	Jaish	High Heel Sneakers
2005
Ruby Wine	Karliyna	Favourita
2004
Incheni	Halicardia	Classical Dancer
2003
Approach	Flying Wanda	Manama Rose
2002
Succinct	Lady's Secret	Threefold
2001
Nafisah	Duchcov	Rizerie

2000-1991
2000
Littlepacepaddocks	Eurolink Raindance	Circle Of Light
1999
Fairy Godmother	Ras Shaikh	String Quartet
1998
Putuna	Zante	Merciless
1997
Squeak	Priena	Western Hour
1996
Sardonic	Min Alhawa	Anthelia
1995
Larrocha	Poppy Carew	Spout
1994
Interim	Tromond	Bearall
1993
Rainbow Lake	Mashair	Dana Springs
1992
Feminine Wiles	Yildiz	Jezebel Monroe
1991
Ocean Air	Mohican Girl	Positive Acclaim

1990-1988
1990
Native Twine	Madame Dubois	Fearless Revival
1989
Shyoushka	Alcando	Arsaan
1988
Triste Oeil	Early Call	Elevate

The Agnes Keyser Fillies' Stakes is a Listed flat horse race in Great Britain open to fillies aged three years. It is run at Goodwood over a distance of 1 mile 1 furlong and 197 yards (1,991 metres), and it is scheduled to take place each year in June.

The race was originally run at Newbury over 1 mile and 2 furlongs. Prior to 2018 its registered title was the Ballymacoll Stud Stakes and from 2003 to 2017 it was run as the Lord Weinstock Memorial Stakes in memory of Arnold Weinstock (1924—2002), a British businessman who owned the Ballymacoll Stud. The stud closed in 2017 and the race's registered title was subsequently changed to the Abingdon Stakes. In 2018 and 2019 the race was run as the Johnnie Lewis Memorial Stakes to commemorate Major Johnnie Lewis, a bloodstock agent who died in 2017. In 2023 the British Horseracing Authority transferred the race to Goodwood and it took its present title.

== Records ==
Leading jockey (5 wins):

- Steve Cauthen – Ballinderry (1984), Shadywood (1985), Shyoushka (1989), Native Twine (1990), Ocean Air (1991)
- Ryan Moore - Darrfonah (2007), Splashdown (2009), Eleanora Duse (2010), Abingdon (2016), Cabaletta (2020)

Leading trainer (8 wins):

- Sir Henry Cecil – Home On The Range (1981), Shadywood (1985), Shyoushka (1989), Native Twine (1990), Ocean Air (1991), Rainbow Lake (1993), Sardonic (1996), Succinct (2000)

== Winners ==
Year	Winner	Jockey	Trainer	Time
1959	Desert Love	Geoff Lewis	Sir Gordon Richards	2:16.40
1960	What Now	Eph Smith	T H Yates	2:11.60
1961	Gold Quill	Scobie Breasley	Sir Gordon Richards	2:09.00
1962	Miss D	Bill Williamson	Harry Wragg	2:09.60
1963	Morning Calm	Lester Piggott	Noel Murless	2:15.00
1964	Versailles	Lester Piggott	Noel Murless	2:11.40
1965	Mabel	Joe Mercer	Peter Walwyn	2:16.00
1966	Teesdale	Stan Clayton	Noel Murless	2:15.00
1967	Park Top	Russ Maddock	Bernard van Cutsem	2:11.20
1968	Auspice	Fred Cheshire	Peter Walwyn	2:12.60
1969	Queen Of Twilight	Brian Taylor	Harvey Leader	2:09.40
1970	Indian Beauty	Brian Taylor	Bill Watts	2:11.10
1971	Sea Coral	Lester Piggott	John Winter	Not taken
1972	Rocelle	Jimmy Lindley	John Sutcliffe	2:10.99
1973	Inspection	Frankie Durr	Arthur Budgett	2:10.94
1974	Sinzinbra	Frankie Durr	Humphrey Cottrill	2:11.15
1975	Light Duty	Joe Mercer	Dick Hern	2:07.04
1976	Silken Way	Lester Piggott	Dick Hern	2:07.32
1977	Salote	Willie Carson	Dick Hern	2:11.98
1978	Swiss Maid	Greville Starkey	Paul Kelleway	2:06.88
1979	Quay Line	Philip Waldron	Henry Candy	2:14.57
1980	Norfolk Gal	Pat Eddery	Peter Walwyn	2:12.61
1981	Home On The Range	Pat Eddery	Henry Cecil	2:07.55
1982	More Kisses	Billy Newnes	Henry Candy	2:09.78
1983	Beach Light	Bruce Raymond	Michael Jarvis	2:10.37
1984	Ballinderry	Steve Cauthen	Jeremy Tree	2:10.08
1985	Shadywood	Steve Cauthen	Henry Cecil	2:14.77
1986	Lavender Mist	Walter Swinburn	Michael Stoute	2:14.74
1987	Blessed Event	Cash Asmussen	Barry Hills	2:10.57
1988	Triste Oeil	Ray Cochrane	Michael Stoute	2:06.31
1989	Shyoushka	Steve Cauthen	Henry Cecil	2:05.87
1990	Native Twine	Steve Cauthen	Henry Cecil	2:04.35
1991	Ocean Air	Steve Cauthen	Henry Cecil	2:10.98
1992	Feminine Wiles	Paul Eddery	Peter Chapple-Hyam	2:06.54
1993	Rainbow Lake	Pat Eddery	Henry Cecil	2:04.94
1994	Interim	Pat Eddery	Roger Charlton	2:07.68
1995	Larrocha	Walter Swinburn	Luca Cumani	2:03.62
1996	Sardonic	Willie Ryan	Henry Cecil	2:03.76
1997	Squeak	Frankie Dettori	John Gosden	2:09.18
1998	Putuna	Michael Roberts	Ian Balding	2:18.35
1999	Fairy Godmother	Richard Hughes	Roger Charlton	2:11.66
2000	Littlepacepaddocks	Kieren Fallon	Mark Johnston	2:04.48
2001	Nafisah	Richard Hills	Ben Hanbury	2:04.89
2002	Succinct	Richard Quinn	Henry Cecil	2:15.80
2003	Approach	George Duffield	Sir Mark Prescott	2:05.11
2004	Incheni	Steve Drowne	Geoff Wragg	2:06.87
2005	Ruby Wine	Ted Durcan	James Eustace	2:05.60
2006	Princess Nada	Nicky Mackay	Luca Cumani	2:08.47
2007	Darrfonah	Ryan Moore	Clive Brittain	2:07.03
2008	Rosa Grace	Chris Catlin	Rae Guest	2:07.49
2009	Splashdown	Ryan Moore	Luca Cumani	2:08.24
2010	Eleanora Duse	Ryan Moore	Sir Michael Stoute	2:07.04
2011	Rumh	Frankie Dettori	Saeed bin Suroor	2:06.35
2012	Great Heavens	William Buick	John Gosden	2:13.51
2013	Cruck Realta	Martin Harley	Mick Channon	2:11.53
2014	Eastern Belle	William Buick	John Gosden	2:05.56
2015	Speedy Boarding	Frederik Tylicki	James Fanshawe	2:05.92
2016	Abingdon	Ryan Moore	Sir Michael Stoute	2:05.47
2017	Elas Ruby	James Doyle	John Gosden	2:07.52
2018	Sea of Class	James Doyle	William Haggas	2:06.00
2019	Antonia De Vega	Harry Bentley	Ralph Beckett	2:11.97
2020	Cabaletta (Note: Franconia finished first in 2020 but was disqualified for failing a post-race drugs sample)	Ryan Moore	Roger Varian	2:05.11
2021	Creative Flair	William Buick	Charlie Appleby	2:03.28
2022	Stay Alert	Josephine Gordon	Hughie Morrison	2:07.96
2023	Al Asifah	Jim Crowley	John & Thady Gosden	2:08.76
2024	Lava Stream	Daniel Tudhope	David O'Meara	2:08.95
2025	Waardah	Callum Rodriguez	Owen Burrows	2:11.58
2026	Venetia	Hector Crouch	Ralph Beckett	2:14.27

== See also ==
- Horse racing in Great Britain
- List of British flat horse races
