= Lancashire Oaks =

- Class: Group 2
- Location: Haydock Park; Haydock, England
- Inaugurated: 1939
- Race type: Flat / Thoroughbred
- Sponsor: Bet365
- Website: Haydock Park

Race information
- Distance: 1m 3f 175y (2,373 m)
- Surface: Turf
- Track: Left-handed
- Qualification: Three-years-old and up fillies & mares
- Weight: 8 st 9 lb (3yo); 9 st 7 lb (4yo+); Penalties; 5 lb for Group 1 winners * 3 lb for Group 2 winners * * after 2024
- Purse: £125,000 (2025); 1st: £70,888

Lancashire Oaks
2026
Tattycoram	Tiffany	Caught U Sleeping

Previous years
2025
Estrange	Scenic	Love Talk
2024
Queen Of The Pride	Tiffany	Lady Boba
2023
Poptronic	Sea Silk Road	Mimikyu
2022
Free Wind	Sea La Rosa	Eshaada
2021
Alpinista	Lady Hayes	Cabaletta

2020-2011
2020
Manuela De Vega	Makawee	Hereby
2019
Enbihaar	Dramatic Queen	Klassique
2018
Horseplay	God Given	Precious Ramotswe
2017
The Black Princess	Abingdon	Ajman Princess
2016
Endless Time	Furia Cruzada	Loving Things
2015
Lady Tiana	Lustrous	Miss Marjurie
2014
Pomology	Sultanina	Talent
2013
Emirates Queen	Moment In Time	Albasharah
2012
Great Heavens	Shimmering Surf	Set To Music
2011
Gertrude Bell	Vita Nova	Dorcas Lane

2010-2001
2010
Barshiba	Polly's Mark	Lady Jane Digby
2009
Barshiba	Fallen In Love	Starfala
2008
Anna Pavlova	Ezima	Queen Of Naples
2007
Turbo Linn	Under The Rainbow	Portal
2006
Allegretto	Local Spirit	Princess Nada
2005
Playful Act	Hidden Hope	Natalie Jane
2004
Pongee	Sahool	Danelissima
2003
Place Rouge	Flying Wanda	New Orchid
2002
Mellow Park	Lady's Secret	Shadow Dancing
2001
Sacred Song	Ranin	All Grain

2000-1991
2000
Ela Athena	Solaia	Chez Cherie
1999
Noushkey	Mistle Song	String Quartet
1998
Catchascatchcan	Rambling Rose	Silver Rhapsody
1997
Squeak	Tulipa	Attitre
1996
Spout	Phantom Gold	Ninotchka
1995
Fanjica	Totality	Magical Retreat
1994
State Crystal	Interim	Nice Welcome
1993
Rainbow Lake	Talented	Rani
1992
Niodini	Armarama	Blushing Storm
1991
Patricia	La Sky	Ausherra

1990-1988
1990
Pharian	Cruising Height	Ivrea
1989
Roseate Tern	Lucky Song	Wrapping
1988
Andaleeb	Dutchess Best	Bourbon Topsy

The Lancashire Oaks is a Group 2 flat horse race in Great Britain open to fillies and mares aged three years or older. It is run at Haydock Park over a distance of 1 mile, 3 furlongs and 175 yards (2,373 metres), and it is scheduled to take place each year in early July.

== History ==
The earliest recorded version of the race was run at Liverpool in the nineteenth century and was won in 1857 by The Derby winner Blink Bonny. The event was re-established in 1939, and it was run at Manchester Racecourse over 1 mile and 3 furlongs. It was abandoned throughout World War II, with no running from 1940 to 1945. In the early part of its history it was restricted to three-year-old fillies.

The original venue of the Lancashire Oaks closed in November 1963, and the race resumed at Haydock Park in 1965. The present system of race grading was introduced in 1971, and the event was subsequently given Group 3 status.

The Lancashire Oaks was opened to older fillies and mares in 1991. It was promoted to Group 2 level in 2004.

== Records ==
Most successful horse (2 wins):

- Barshiba – 2009, 2010

Leading jockey (6 wins):

- Doug Smith – Smoke Screen (1947), Noble Lassie (1959), Chota Hazri (1960), Irristable (1961), French Cream (1962), Royal Flirt (1966)

Leading trainer (10 wins):

- John Gosden - Squeak (1997), Place Rouge (2003), Playful Act (2005), Gertrude Bell (2011), Great Heavens (2012), Pomology (2014), The Black Princess (2017), Enbihaar (2019), Free Wind (2022), Queen Of The Pride (2024)

== Winners since 1939 ==
Year	Winner	Age	Jockey	Trainer	Time
1939	Cestria	3	Harry Wragg	William Jarvis	2:19.60
	no race 1940-45
1946	Live Letters	3	Tommy Weston	Noel Cannon	2:25.00
1947	Smoke Screen	3	Doug Smith	Walter Earl	2:29.60
1948	Young Entry	3	Billy Nevett	Cecil Boyd-Rochfort	2:18.60
1949	Eyewash	3	Joseph Caldwell	Rufus Beasley	2:21.80
1950	Dutch Clover	3	Eph Smith	Rufus Beasley	2:17.20
1951	Dollarina	3	Percy Evans	Geoffrey Brooke	2:19.80
1952	Stream of Light	3	Harry Carr	Cecil Boyd-Rochfort	2:26.20
1953	Harvest Festival	3	Billy Nevett	Robert Poole
1954	Blue Prelude	3	Geoff Littlewood	William Bellerby	2:25.40
1955	Jenny Lind	3	Edgar Britt	Charles Elsey	2:20.20
1956	Hustle	3	Eph Smith	Ted Leader	2:16.60
1957	Lobelia	3	Eph Smith	Harvey Leader	2:22.63
1958	St. Lucia	3	Geoff Lewis	Peter Hastings-Bass	2:27.90
1959	Noble Lassie	3	Doug Smith	Dick Hern	2:17.06
1960	Chota Hazri	3	Doug Smith	Harry Wragg	2:23.74
1961	Irristable	3	Doug Smith	Geoffrey Brooke	2:19.27
1962	French Cream	3	Doug Smith	Geoffrey Brooke	2:20.59
1963	Red Chorus	3	Lester Piggott	Noel Murless	2:17.42
	no race 1964
1965	Without Reproach	3	Eddie Hide	Bill Elsey	2:30.60
1966	Royal Flirt	3	Doug Smith	Geoffrey Brooke	2:33.60
1967	The Nun	3	Joe Mercer	Dick Hern	2:32.80
1968	Bringley	3	Brian Taylor	Harvey Leader	2:33.80
1969	Gambola	3	Bill Williamson	Gordon Smyth	2:36.00
1970	Amphora	3	John Gorton	Bruce Hobbs	2:30.00
1971	Maina	3	Lester Piggott	Noel Murless	2:32.40
1972	Star Ship	3	Tony Murray	Ryan Price	2:40.03
1973	Istiea	3	Pat Eddery	Harry Wragg	2:33.37
1974	Mil's Bomb	3	Geoff Lewis	Noel Murless	2:37.04
1975	One Over Parr	3	Pat Eddery	Peter Walwyn	2:34.45
1976	Centrocon	3	Philip Waldron	Henry Candy	2:31.35
1977	Busaca	3	Pat Eddery	Peter Walwyn	2:36.85
1978	Princess Eboli	3	Geoff Lewis	Bruce Hobbs	2:38.81
1979	Reprocolor	3	Greville Starkey	Michael Stoute	2:36.65
1980	Vielle	3	Paul Cook	Bruce Hobbs	2:37.67
1981	Rhein Bridge	3	Edward Hide	Bill Watts	2:29.96
1982	Sing Softly	3	Lester Piggott	Henry Cecil	2:31.63
1983	Give Thanks	3	Declan Gillespie	Jim Bolger	2:33.06
1984	Sandy Island	3	Lester Piggott	Henry Cecil	2:30.94
1985	Graecia Magna	3	Greville Starkey	Guy Harwood	2:31.52
1986	Park Express	3	John Reid	Jim Bolger	2:29.30
1987	Three Tails	3	Tony Ives	John Dunlop	2:27.88
1988	Andaleeb	3	Pat Eddery	Jeremy Tree	2:31.28
1989	Roseate Tern	3	Tony Ives	Dick Hern	2:36.25
1990	Pharian	3	Frankie Dettori	Clive Brittain	2:38.91
1991	Patricia	3	Gary Carter	Henry Cecil	2:27.99
1992	Niodini	3	Paul Eddery	Michael Stoute	2:32.66
1993	Rainbow Lake	3	Willie Ryan	Henry Cecil	2:33.44
1994	State Crystal	3	Willie Ryan	Henry Cecil	2:30.07
1995	Fanjica	3	Gary Carter	John Dunlop	2:29.74
1996	Spout	4	Tim Sprake	Roger Charlton	2:33.61
1997	Squeak	3	Gary Hind	John Gosden	2:33.12
1998	Catchascatchcan	3	Willie Ryan	Henry Cecil	2:28.42
1999	Noushkey	3	Philip Robinson	Michael Jarvis	2:36.20
2000	Ela Athena	4	Philip Robinson	Michael Jarvis	2:30.42
2001	Sacred Song	4	Richard Quinn	Henry Cecil	2:33.15
2002	Mellow Park	3	Darryll Holland	Jeremy Noseda	2:33.13
2003	Place Rouge	4	Robert Havlin	John Gosden	2:29.76
2004	Pongee	4	Jimmy Fortune	Luca Cumani	2:32.90
2005	Playful Act	3	Jimmy Fortune	John Gosden	2:31.21
2006	Allegretto	3	Ryan Moore	Sir Michael Stoute	2:28.44
2007 ^{[a]}	Turbo Linn	4	Neil Callan	Alan Swinbank	2:31.34
2008	Anna Pavlova	5	Paul Hanagan	Richard Fahey	2:34.76
2009	Barshiba	5	Paul Hanagan	David Elsworth	2:30.36
2010	Barshiba	6	Hayley Turner	David Elsworth	2:30.85
2011	Gertrude Bell	4	William Buick	John Gosden	2:30.59
2012	Great Heavens	3	Robert Havlin	John Gosden	2:32.30
2013	Emirates Queen	4	Andrea Atzeni	Luca Cumani	2:30.84
2014	Pomology	4	Graham Lee	John Gosden	2:31.60
2015	Lady Tiana	4	Graham Lee	Lucy Wadham	2:33.11
2016	Endless Time	4	James Doyle	Charlie Appleby	2:40.21
2017	The Black Princess	4	Robert Tart	John Gosden	2:33.74
2018	Horseplay	4	David Probert	Andrew Balding	2:28.56
2019	Enbihaar	4	Dane O'Neill	John Gosden	2:30.63
2020	Manuela De Vega	4	Harry Bentley	Ralph Beckett	2:35.71
2021	Alpinista	4	Luke Morris	Sir Mark Prescott	2:37.44
2022	Free Wind	4	Robert Havlin	John & Thady Gosden	2:37.89
2023	Poptronic	4	Sam James	Karl Burke	2:28.59
2024	Queen Of The Pride	4	Oisin Murphy	John & Thady Gosden	2:31.40
2025	Estrange	4	Daniel Tudhope	David O'Meara	2:36.15
2026 ^{[b]}	Tattycoram	4	Edward Greatrex	Ralph Beckett	2:26.47

^{a} The 2007 running took place at Newmarket over 1 mile and 4 furlongs. ^{b} The 2026 running took place at Newmarket over 1 mile and 4 furlongs.

== Earlier winners ==
- 1857: Blink Bonny

== See also ==
- Horse racing in Great Britain
- List of British flat horse races
