= Magical Romance =

Irish-bred Thoroughbred racehorse

- Sire: Barathea
- Grandsire: Sadler's Wells
- Dam: Shouk
- Damsire: Shirley Heights
- Sex: Mare
- Foaled: 5 February 2002
- Country: Ireland
- Colour: Bay
- Breeder: Quay Bloodstock & Samac Ltd
- Owner: Con Wilson
- Trainer: Brian Meehan
- Record: 9: 3-0-0
- Earnings: £127,760

Major wins
- Cheveley Park Stakes (2004)

Magical Romance (foaled 5 February 2002) is an Irish-bred British-trained Thoroughbred racehorse and broodmare. In a racing career which lasted from June 2004 until September 2005, she won three of her nine races. As a two-year-old in 2004, she won two minor races but then recorded a 40/1 upset victory in Group One Cheveley Park Stakes. She failed to win or place in four starts in 2005, and was retired from racing at the end of that year. In 2006, she was bought for 4.6 million guineas, a world- record price for a broodmare sold at suction.

== Background ==
Magical Romance is a bay mare with a white star and snip and four white socks bred in Ireland by Quay Bloodstock & Samac Ltd. She was sired by Barathea, a specialist miler who was named European Horse of the Year in 1994, a year in which he won the Breeders' Cup Mile. He became a successful stallion, siring the winners of over seven hundred races, including Tobougg, Overturn and Tante Rose (Haydock Sprint Cup) Her dam Shouk, a daughter of Shirley Heights, won one minor race at Haydock Park in 1997. but was a successful broodmare: after foaling Magical Romance she went on to produce The Oaks winner Alexandrova.

In October 2003, the yearling filly was consigned to the Tattersalls sale and was bought for 125,000 guineas by the bloodstock agent McKeever St Lawrence. The filly entered the ownership of Con Wilson and was sent into training with Brian Meehan.

== Racing career ==
=== 2004: two-year-old season ===
Magical Romance made her racecourse debut in a five furlong maiden race at Windsor Racecourse on 28 June in which she finished fourth of the nine runners behind Roodeye. On 14 July the filly was stepped up in distance to six furlongs for a maiden at Kempton Park Racecourse and started the 3/1 favourite against twelve opponents. Ridden as on her previous race by Jimmy Fortune she took the lead approaching the final furlong and won by two and a half lengths from Miss Malone. When moved up in class for the Group Three Princess Margaret Stakes at Ascot Racecourse ten days later she made no impact and finished last of the six runners behind Soar.

After a break of almost two months, Magical Romance returned for a Nursery (a handicap race for two-year-olds) at Leicester Racecourse on 20 September in which she was assigned top-weight of 130 pounds. Ridden for the first time by Robert Winston, She took the lead from the start, went clear of her twelve rivals approaching the final furlong, and won by three lengths from Aberdeen Park.

Ten days after her win at Leicester, the filly contested the Group One Cheveley Park Stakes at Newmarket Racecourse and started the 40/1 outsider of the seven runners. The Phoenix Stakes winner "Damson" started as odds-on-favourite ahead of "Soar" and Dick Poole Fillies' Stakes winner "Suez", whilst the other three runners were "Jewel In The Sand" (Cherry Hinton Stakes), "Golden Legacy" (Firth of Clyde Stakes) and "Slip Dance" (Empress Stakes). Winston again took the ride after her intended jockey, Jimmy Fortune, had been kicked in the stomach by a horse at Salisbury Racecourse on the previous day. Magical Romance tracked the leader Suez before moving up to challenge for the lead approaching the final furlong. The race resulted in a blanket-finish, with Magical Romance prevailing by a neck from Suez, with Damson, Golden Legacy and Slip Dance close behind. Winston admitted to some mixed feelings, saying "It is really nice to win this but I do feel sorry for Jimmy, he's been very unlucky". Meehan explained, "We ran her in the Princess Margaret before Leicester where we thought she would finish in the first four but she got jarred up and her last win just helped to get her confidence back. She's a lovely filly and has always shown plenty at home. The rain probably helped her a little bit but she's a real nice filly. The way she ran would suggest that getting a mile next season would be no problem for her." Her winning odds made her the longest-priced winner in the history of the race.

=== 2005: three-year-old season ===
On her three-year-old debut, Magical Romance was sent to France for the Poule d'Essai des Pouliches over 1600 metres at Longchamp Racecourse on 14 May. Meehan had opted to bypass the 1000 Guineas on account of the prevailing firm ground in Britain. In the French race she ran wide on the final bend and never looked likely to get into contention, finishing sixth of the eight runners, twelve lengths behind the winner Divine Proportions. She was then moved up in distance for the Oaks Stakes over one and a half miles at Epsom Downs Racecourse on 3 June. Starting a 50/1 outsider she led the field until the last quarter mile but then faded into sixth behind Eswarah. The filly was unable to recover her form in two subsequent races: she finished last of eleven in the Nassau Stakes and last of six in the Listed Fortune Stakes at Epsom in September.

== Breeding record ==
Magical Romance was retired from racing to become a broodmare and on 28 November 2006 she was auctioned off for a second time at Tattersalls. The bidding involved representatives of the Lodge Park Stud and Hamdan Al Maktoum, and reached 4.6 million guineas before she was sold to James Wigan of London Thoroughbred Services, acting on behalf of Lady Rothschild. The price was a world record for a broodmare sold at auction.

She has produced at least five foals and four winners:

- Liel, a bay filly, foaled in 2006, sired by Pivotal. Failed to win in six races. The filly was born prematurely in December, severely compromising her potential as a racehorse.
- Dean Swift, bay colt, 2008, by Dansili. Won one race.
- Modern Tutor, bay colt (later gelded), 2009, by Selkirk. Won two races.
- Love Magic, bay filly, 2010, by Dansili. Won one race. Dam of Channel.
- Tall Ship, bay colt (later gelded), 2011, by Sea the Stars. Won two races in Europe, and four races Australia.

== Pedigree ==
Pedigree of Magical Romance (IRE), bay mare, 2002
Sire Barathea (IRE) 1990	Sadler's Wells (USA); 1981	Northern Dancer	Nearctic
Sire Barathea (IRE) 1990	Sadler's Wells (USA); 1981	Northern Dancer	Natalma
Sire Barathea (IRE) 1990	Sadler's Wells (USA); 1981	Fairy Bridge	Bold Reason
Sire Barathea (IRE) 1990	Sadler's Wells (USA); 1981	Fairy Bridge	Special
Sire Barathea (IRE) 1990	Brocade (GB); 1981	Habitat	Sir Gaylord
Sire Barathea (IRE) 1990	Brocade (GB); 1981	Habitat	Little Hut
Sire Barathea (IRE) 1990	Brocade (GB); 1981	Canton Silk	Runnymede
Sire Barathea (IRE) 1990	Brocade (GB); 1981	Canton Silk	Clouded Lamp
Dam Shouk (GB) 1994	Shirley Heights (GB); 1975	Mill Reef	Never Bend
Dam Shouk (GB) 1994	Shirley Heights (GB); 1975	Mill Reef	Milan Mill
Dam Shouk (GB) 1994	Shirley Heights (GB); 1975	Hardiemma	Hardicanute
Dam Shouk (GB) 1994	Shirley Heights (GB); 1975	Hardiemma	Grand Cross
Dam Shouk (GB) 1994	Souk (IRE); 1988	Ahonoora	Lorenzaccio
Dam Shouk (GB) 1994	Souk (IRE); 1988	Ahonoora	Helen Nichols
Dam Shouk (GB) 1994	Souk (IRE); 1988	Soumana	Pharly
Dam Shouk (GB) 1994	Souk (IRE); 1988	Soumana	Faizebad (Family: 21-a)
