= Entrepreneur (horse) =

British-bred Thoroughbred racehorse

- Sire: Sadler's Wells
- Grandsire: Northern Dancer
- Dam: Exclusive Order
- Damsire: Exclusive Native
- Sex: Stallion
- Foaled: 7 March 1994
- Country: United Kingdom
- Colour: Bay
- Breeder: Cheveley Park Stud
- Owner: Susan Magnier & Michael Tabor
- Trainer: Michael Stoute
- Record: 6:3-0-0
- Earnings: £189,826

Major wins
- 2000 Guineas (1997)

Entrepreneur (foaled 7 March 1994) was a British Thoroughbred racehorse and sire. In a career that lasted from August 1996 to September 1997 he ran six times and won three races. After winning two of his three races in 1996 he won the 2000 Guineas on his first start as a three-year-old. Entrepreneur then started the shortest-priced Epsom Derby favourite for fifty years, but finished fourth. After another disappointing run in autumn he was retired to stud.

== Background ==
Entrepreneur is a bay horse bred by the Cheveley Park Stud at Newmarket, Suffolk. He was sired by the fourteen times Champion sire Sadler's Wells out of Exclusive Order, a mare who won the Prix Maurice de Gheest in 1983, making him a brother to the filly Dance A Dream who finished runner-up in The Oaks. As a yearling he was sent by his breeders to the Tattersalls Houghton sales in September 1995 where he was bought for 600,000 guineas by the bloodstock agent Dermot "Demi" O'Byrne on behalf of John Magnier's Coolmore organisation. During his racing career Entrepreneur was officially owned in partnership by Magnier's wife Susan and Michael Tabor. The colt was trained by Michael Stoute at Newmarket.

== Racing career ==
=== 1996: two-year-old season ===
Entrepreneur made his first racecourse appearance in a seven furlong maiden race at Newmarket in August. He started favourite at odds of 4/9 in a nine-runner field and finished strongly to finish take fourth place, two lengths behind the winner Right Tune. His defeat was later explained by his having taken a keen interest in a filly in the race which had distracted him from the business of racing. Three weeks later he won a similar event at Kempton taking the lead two furlongs out and accelerating away from the other runners to beat Falak by five lengths. In September he was sent to Chester for a minor stakes race for which he started at odds of 1/6. He took the lead inside the final furlong and pulled away to win by two and a half lengths in "impressive" style.

=== 1997: three-year-old season ===
On his first appearance of 1997 Entrepreneur ran in the classic 2000 Guineas at Newmarket on 3 May for which he was made 11/2 second favourite despite never having previously contested a Group race. His odds drifted out slightly after he was seen to be sweating freely and appeared nervous and unsettled in the paddock before the race. Ridden by Mick Kinane he raced just behind the leaders into the early stages of the one mile before being sent to the front two furlongs from the finish. He ran on strongly in the closing stages to hold the late challenge of the favourite Revoque and win by three quarters of a length. Commenting on the colt's victory, Kinane called Entrepreneur "a classy individual... he's got that different speed", while expressing his confidence in the colt's ability to be effective over longer distances.

In the course the following month Entrepreneur was confidently supported as the favourite for the Derby, although he would be racing over a distance half a mile further than any of his previous races. Two weeks before the race the leading British trainer called the race a "foregone conclusion", and Entrepreneur's price shortened after Revoque was withdrawn following a poor run in the Irish 2,000 Guineas. Entrepreneur ran against twelve opponents in the Derby at Epsom on 7 June and started the 4/6 favourite with Silver Patriarch being the second choice in the betting at 6/1. His starting price was the shortest for any Derby runner since Tudor Minstrel was beaten at 4/7 in 1947. He appeared to have every chance in the straight but came under pressure and was unable to reach the lead before finishing fourth behind Benny the Dip, Silver Patriarch and Romanov, beaten more than eight and a half lengths.

Following his defeat in the Derby, Entrepreneur was off the racecourse for more than three months before returning in the Queen Elizabeth II Stakes over one mile at Ascot on 27 September. He started joint second favourite on 9/2 but was never a danger and finished seventh of the nine runners behind Air Express.

== Stud career ==
Entrepreneur stood as a stallion for his owners' Coolmore stud, beginning in Ireland at a fee of 17,500 Irish guineas. He was also "shuttled" to New Zealand for the southern hemisphere breeding season where he was based at the Oaks Stud at Cambridge, but was not considered a success. In 2002 he was moved to the Suwa Farm stud in Japan and three years later he was sold to stand as a stallion at the Voskhod stud in Russia. He has sired the winners of over 200 races, the most notable being the Irish Oaks winner Vintage Tipple and the Phoenix Stakes winner Damson. He is also the damsire of The Grey Gatsby.

== Pedigree ==
Pedigree of Entrepreneur (GB), bay stallion, 1994
Sire Sadler's Wells (USA) 1981	Northern Dancer; 1961	Nearctic	Nearco
Sire Sadler's Wells (USA) 1981	Northern Dancer; 1961	Nearctic	Lady Angela
Sire Sadler's Wells (USA) 1981	Northern Dancer; 1961	Natalma	Native Dancer
Sire Sadler's Wells (USA) 1981	Northern Dancer; 1961	Natalma	Almahmoud
Sire Sadler's Wells (USA) 1981	Fairy Bridge; 1975	Bold Reason	Hail to Reason
Sire Sadler's Wells (USA) 1981	Fairy Bridge; 1975	Bold Reason	Lalun
Sire Sadler's Wells (USA) 1981	Fairy Bridge; 1975	Special	Forli
Sire Sadler's Wells (USA) 1981	Fairy Bridge; 1975	Special	Thong
Dam Exclusive Order (USA) 1979	Exclusive Native; 1965	Raise a Native	Native Dancer
Dam Exclusive Order (USA) 1979	Exclusive Native; 1965	Raise a Native	Raise You
Dam Exclusive Order (USA) 1979	Exclusive Native; 1965	Exclusive	Shut Out
Dam Exclusive Order (USA) 1979	Exclusive Native; 1965	Exclusive	Good Example
Dam Exclusive Order (USA) 1979	Bonavista; 1964	Dead Ahead	Turn-To
Dam Exclusive Order (USA) 1979	Bonavista; 1964	Dead Ahead	Siama
Dam Exclusive Order (USA) 1979	Bonavista; 1964	Ribotina	Ribot
Dam Exclusive Order (USA) 1979	Bonavista; 1964	Ribotina	French Polish (Family:6-e)

- Entrepreneur was inbred 4 × 4 to the stallion Native Dancer, meaning that the latter appears twice in the fourth generation of his pedigree.
