= Great Heavens =

British-bred Thoroughbred racehorse

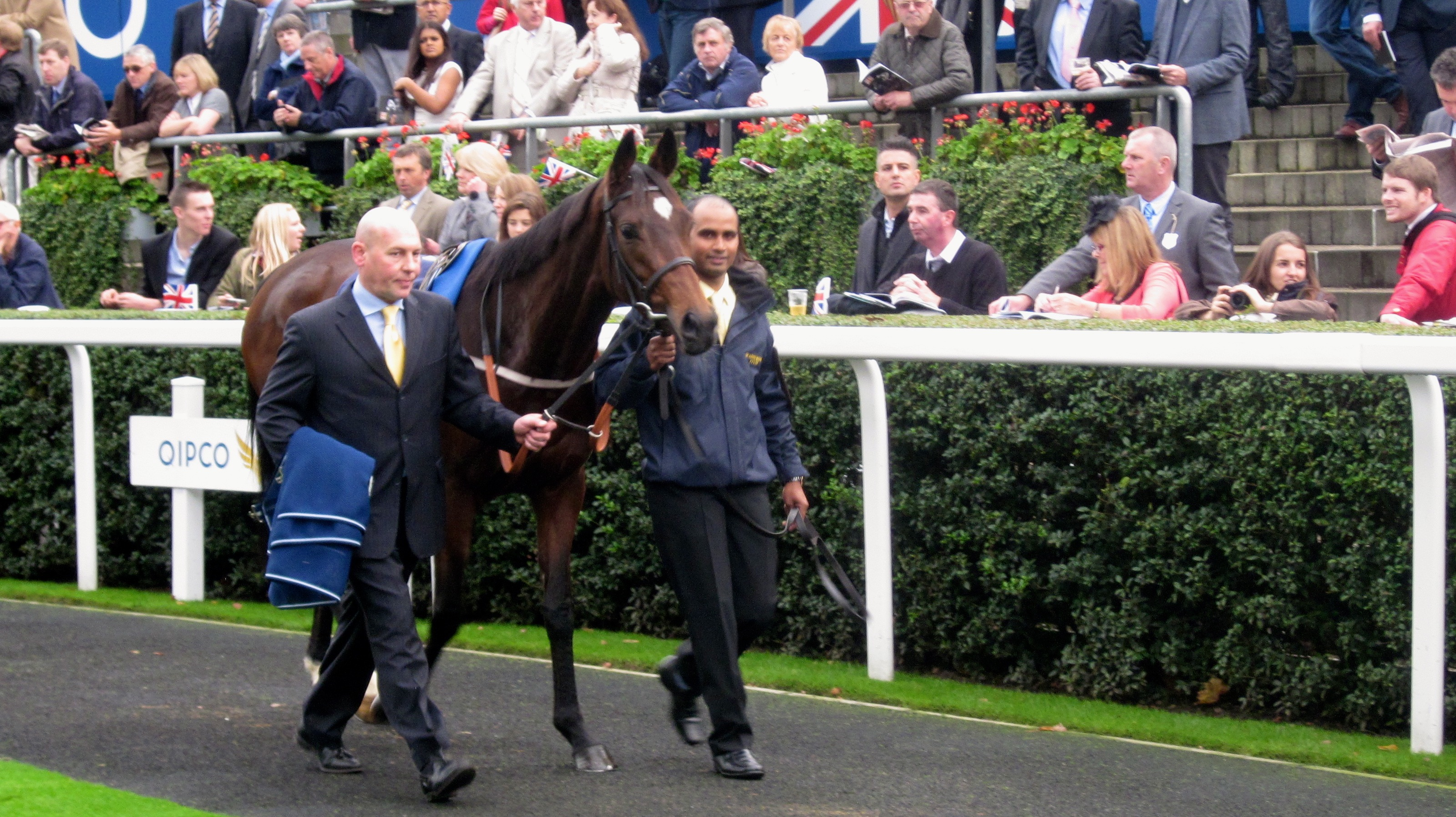
- Great Heavens in the parade ring
- Sire: Galileo
- Grandsire: Sadler's Wells
- Dam: Magnificient Style
- Damsire: Silver Hawk
- Sex: Filly
- Foaled: 2009
- Country: United Kingdom
- Colour: Bay
- Breeder: Kincorth Investments Inc
- Owner: Lady Rothschild
- Trainer: John Gosden
- Record: 7: 4-0-0
- Earnings: £275,312

Major wins
- Lancashire Oaks (2012); Irish Oaks (2012)

Great Heavens (foaled 28 April 2009) is a British Thoroughbred racehorse who won the 2012 Irish Oaks. She is owned by Lady Rothschild and trained by John Gosden.

== Breeding ==
Great Heavens is the daughter of Galileo, who won The Derby, Irish Derby and King George and multiple Champion sire. Galileo's sire was Sadler's Wells, winner of the Eclipse Stakes and Irish Champion Stakes and multiple Champion sire.

Great Heavens' dam Magnificient Style is the daughter of Silver Hawk. Great Heavens is a full-sister to King George and Eclipse winner Nathaniel. She is also the half-sister to Fillies' Mile winner Playful Act and Sun Chariot Stakes winner Echoes in Eternity.

== Racing career ==
Great Heavens only started once as a two-year-old, finishing in fifth place in an eight furlong Haydock maiden. Starting her three-year-old season in a Yarmouth maiden she won comfortable from Monshak. She then started the Listed Lord Weinstock Memorial Stakes at Newbury as the 11/8 favourite. Under jockey William Buick she made all the running and won unchallenged. Great Heavens then faced eight rivals in the Lancashire Oaks where she was the 11/4 favourite. She again made all the running and won impressively, beating Pinnacle Stakes winner Shimmering Surf by five lengths.

After this performance she was sent off the 5/4 favourite in the Irish Oaks. The Ribblesdale Stakes winner Princess Highway was at 9/4, with Epsom Oaks winner Was at 5/1 and Epsom Oaks second Shirocco Star at 7/1. As the field of seven turned into the finishing straight Great Heavens was in fifth place. She ran on strongly in the final furlong and took the lead with 100 yards to run. She then drew clear to win by three lengths from Shirocco Star.

On 4 October, Great Heavens' owners paid a supplementary entry fee of €100,000 to run the filly in the Prix de l'Arc de Triomphe. She started the 7.5/1 fourth favourite and fared the best of the British and Irish challengers as she finished sixth behind the upset winner Solemia.

== Pedigree ==
Pedigree of Great Heavens, bay filly, 2009
Sire Galileo b. 1998	Sadler's Wells b. 1981	Northern Dancer b. 1961	Nearctic*
Sire Galileo b. 1998	Sadler's Wells b. 1981	Northern Dancer b. 1961	Natalma
Sire Galileo b. 1998	Sadler's Wells b. 1981	Fairy Bridge b. 1975	Bold Reason
Sire Galileo b. 1998	Sadler's Wells b. 1981	Fairy Bridge b. 1975	Special
Sire Galileo b. 1998	Urban Sea ch. 1989	Miswaki ch. 1978	Mr. Prospector
Sire Galileo b. 1998	Urban Sea ch. 1989	Miswaki ch. 1978	Hopespringeternal
Sire Galileo b. 1998	Urban Sea ch. 1989	Allegretta ch. 1978	Lombard
Sire Galileo b. 1998	Urban Sea ch. 1989	Allegretta ch. 1978	Anatevka
Dam Magnificient Style b. 1993	Silver Hawk b. 1979	Roberto b. 1969	Hail to Reason
Dam Magnificient Style b. 1993	Silver Hawk b. 1979	Roberto b. 1969	Bramalea
Dam Magnificient Style b. 1993	Silver Hawk b. 1979	Gris Vitesse gr. 1966	Amerigo
Dam Magnificient Style b. 1993	Silver Hawk b. 1979	Gris Vitesse gr. 1966	Matchiche
Dam Magnificient Style b. 1993	Mia Karina b. 1983	Icecapade gr. 1969	Nearctic*
Dam Magnificient Style b. 1993	Mia Karina b. 1983	Icecapade gr. 1969	Shenanigans
Dam Magnificient Style b. 1993	Mia Karina b. 1983	Basin b. 1972	Tom Rolfe
Dam Magnificient Style b. 1993	Mia Karina b. 1983	Basin b. 1972	Delta

Note: b. = Bay, ch. = Chestnut, gr. = Grey

* Great Heavens is inbred 4x4 to Nearctic. This means that the stallion appears twice in the fourth generation of her pedigree.
