= Nathaniel (horse) =

Irish-bred Thoroughbred racehorse

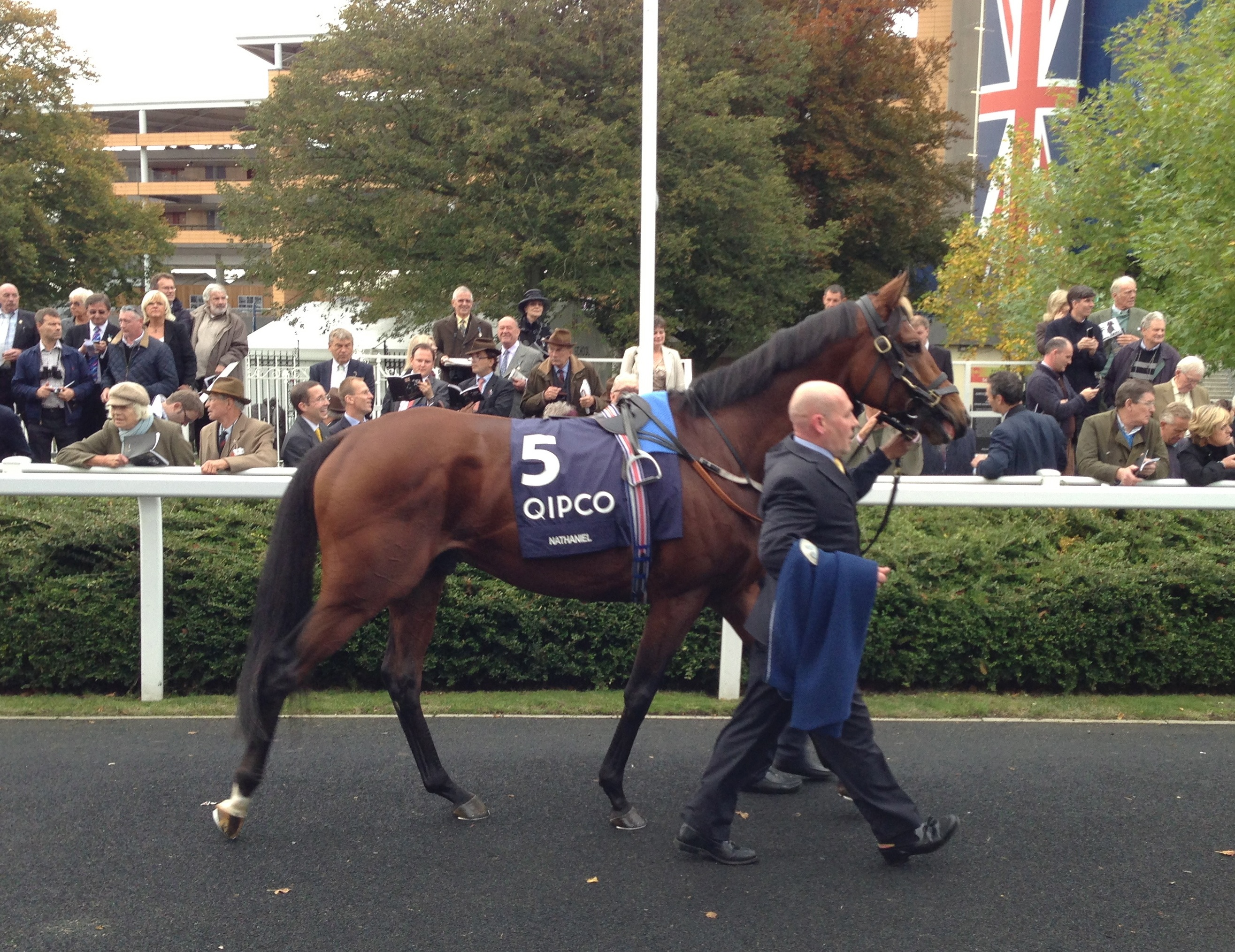
- Nathaniel at Ascot before the Champion Stakes
- Sire: Galileo
- Grandsire: Sadler's Wells
- Dam: Magnificient Style
- Damsire: Silver Hawk
- Sex: Stallion
- Foaled: 24 April 2008
- Country: Ireland
- Colour: Bay
- Breeder: Kincorth Investments Inc.
- Owner: Lady Rothschild
- Trainer: John Gosden
- Jockey: William Buick
- Record: 11: 4–5–1
- Earnings: £1,464,688

Major wins
- King Edward VII Stakes (2011); King George VI and Queen Elizabeth Stakes (2011); Eclipse Stakes (2012)

Awards
- Timeform rating 131

Nathaniel (foaled 24 April 2008) is an Irish-bred British-trained Thoroughbred racehorse. Nathaniel failed to win in two races as a two-year-old but attracted attention by running Frankel to half a length at Newmarket. At three he recorded his first major win in the King Edward VII Stakes at Royal Ascot and then won Britain's most prestigious all-aged race, the King George VI and Queen Elizabeth Stakes over the same course and distance. Nathaniel returned in 2012 to win the Eclipse Stakes on his seasonal debut. Although he failed to win again he was placed in the King George, the Irish Champion Stakes and the Champion Stakes before being retired at the end of the year. During his racing career he earned £1,464,688. He made an immediate impact as a breeding stallion, siring the champion filly Enable in his first season at stud.

== Background ==
Nathaniel is a bay colt with a large white star, sired by The Derby winner Galileo, out of the mare Magnificient Style. He was bred in Ireland by Kincorth Investments, a company owned by Lady Rothschild. Nathaniel is a half-brother of the Fillies' Mile winner Playful Act who was purchased in 2007 by Sheikh Mohammed's Darley Stud operation at the Keeneland breeding stock sale for a world record price of US$10.5 million. Magnificient Style's other progeny include Echoes in Eternity (Sun Chariot Stakes), Great Heavens (Irish Oaks) and Percussionist (Yorkshire Cup).

The colt was named after his owner's son Nathaniel Rothschild. Nathaniel was sent into training with John Gosden at his Clarehaven Stables at Newmarket. He was ridden in all of his races by the Norwegian-born jockey William Buick.

== Racing career ==
=== 2010: two-year-old season ===
Nathaniel began his two-year-old career on 13 August 2010 in a one-mile maiden race at Newmarket on soft ground, in which he was beaten half a length by Sir Henry Cecil's Frankel, with the pair finishing five lengths clear of their opponents. The race remains the closest of Frankel's career. A month later, Nathaniel started 5/6 favourite for a similar event at Doncaster. He took the lead a furlong from the finish but was caught in the closing stages and beaten a short head by Picture Editor.

=== 2011: three-year-old season ===
Nathaniel began his three-year-old season by recording his first win when beating two opponents in a maiden race at Haydock Park Racecourse in April. He won by nine lengths at odds of 1/20. Nathaniel then started 6/4 favourite for the Chester Vase in May but despite finishing strongly he was beaten a head by the Irish-trained colt Treasure Beach.

Nathaniel did not run in The Derby as Gosden felt that the ground at Epsom would be too fast for the colt. He appeared instead at Royal Ascot where he won the King Edward VII Stakes "comfortably" by five lengths. Immediately after the race, Gosden indicated that the colt would be aimed at the St Leger Stakes. A month later however, Nathaniel returned to Ascot to contest the King George VI and Queen Elizabeth Stakes over the same distance, after his owners paid a supplementary entry fee of £75,000. He was the only three-year-old in a field which included St Nicholas Abbey, Workforce and Rewilding. Ridden by William Buick, Nathaniel pulled hard in the early stages and was forced to lead before settling behind the pacemaker Debussy. In the straight, Nathaniel accelerated into the lead down the centre of the track and won by two and three quarter lengths from Workforce who had hung badly across to the stands side. St Nicholas Abbey finished third, while Rewilding was fatally injured when falling two furlongs from the finish. Nathaniel was the first three-year-old to win the race for eight years. His trainer John Gosden helped tend to the injured Rewilding, giving the colt a "final munch of grass" before he was euthanised. Gosden said that Nathaniel was still improving and indicated that his next target would probably be the Prix de l'Arc de Triomphe.

Shortly before the Prix de l'Arc de Triomphe, Gosden announced that Nathaniel would miss the race as he would be unsuited by the prevailing firm ground. Nathaniel was rerouted to the Champion Stakes over ten furlongs at Ascot two weeks later. In the most valuable race ever run in Britain, Nathaniel disputed the lead with Ransom Note before taking a clear advantage approaching the straight. He was headed by So You Think approaching the final furlong and ran on at "one pace" to finish fifth behind Cirrus des Aigles, beaten three and a half lengths.

At the end of the year, Nathaniel was rated the equal seventh best racehorse in the world in the 2011 World Thoroughbred Racehorse Rankings.

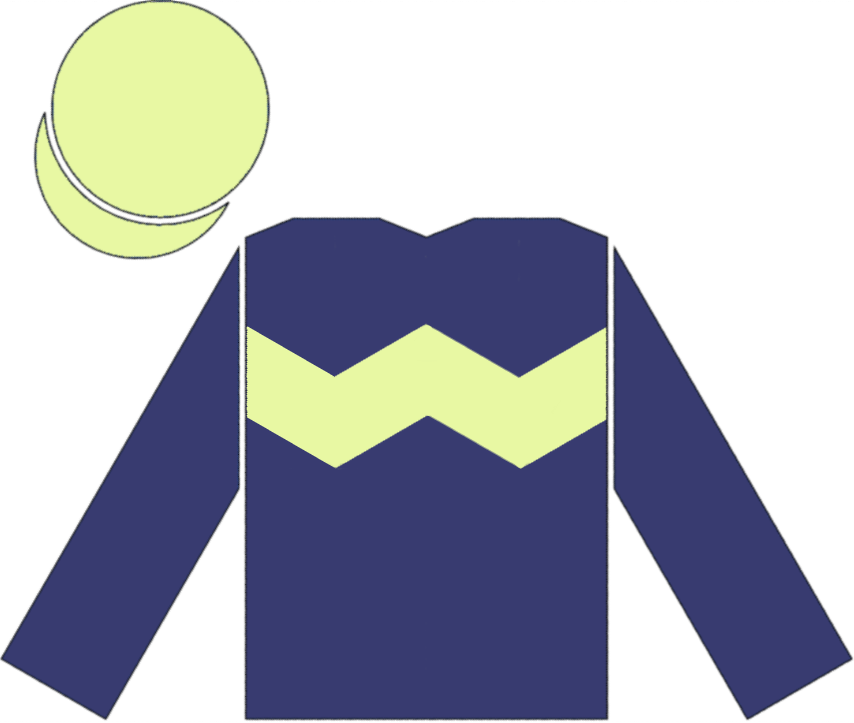
Racing silks of Lady Rothschild

=== 2012: four-year-old season ===
Nathaniel had respiratory problems in early 2012 and did not make his first appearance of the season until the Eclipse Stakes at Sandown on 7 July. Running for the first time in more than eight months, he started 7/2 second favourite in a field which included Monterosso, Twice Over, Cityscape (Dubai Duty Free), Crackerjack King (Derby Italiano) and Bonfire (Dante Stakes). Buick sent Nathaniel past the pacemaker City Style to take the lead on the turn into the straight. In the final quarter mile, Nathaniel held off several challengers to win by half a length from Farhh with Twice Over third.

In the King George, Nathaniel was made 5/2 second favourite to repeat his success of 2011 against a field which included St Nicholas Abbey, Dunaden, Masked Marvel, Danedream, Deep Brillante, Sea Moon and Reliable Man. Buick tracked the leaders before moving Nathaniel into the lead in the straight. He ran on under pressure, but was caught in the last stride and beaten a nose by Danedream. Gosden described the horse's performance coming only two weeks after the Eclipse as "phenomenal" and mentioned the Prix de l'Arc de Triomphe, Champion Stakes and International Stakes as possible future targets.

On his next appearance, Nathaniel started 13/8 favourite for the Irish Champion Stakes at Leopardstown Racecourse, despite Gosden warning that the horse was being trained for the Arc de Triomphe and might not be at his peak. He took the lead in the straight but was headed inside the final furlong and beaten one and a quarter lengths by the mare Snow Fairy. Five days before Nathaniel's intended run in the Arc, he was found to be running a high temperature and when the results of a blood test were unsatisfactory he was withdrawn from the race.

After missing the Arc, Nathaniel ran in the Champion Stakes on 20 October. The unbeaten Frankel won the race by one and three quarter lengths from Cirrus Des Aigles, who was a further two and a half lengths clear of Nathaniel in third.

== Stud career ==
A week after the Champion Stakes it was announced that Nathaniel would be retired from racing and would begin his stud career in 2013 at the Newsells Park Stud in Hertfordshire. His stud fee was announced to be £20,000 in November 2012. His first crop of foals included The Oaks, King George VI & Queen Elizabeth Stakes and dual Prix de l'Arc de Triomphe winner Enable and the success of this crop saw his stud fee increase to £20,000 for the 2018 breeding season.

=== Notable progeny ===
c = colt, f = filly, g = gelding

Foaled	Name	Dam	Dam's sire	Sex	Major wins
2014	Enable	Concentric	Sadler's Wells	f	Epsom Oaks (2017), Irish Oaks (2017), King George VI and Queen Elizabeth Stakes (2017, 2019, 2020), Yorkshire Oaks (2017, 2019), Prix de l'Arc de Triomphe (2017, 2018), Breeders' Cup Turf (2018), Eclipse Stakes (2019)
2014	God Given	Ever Rigg	Dubai Destination	f	Premio Lydia Tesio (2018)
2016	Burning Victory	M'oubliez Pas	El Corredor	f	Triumph Hurdle (2020)
2016	Channel	Love Magic	Dansili	f	Prix de Diane (2019)
2016	Lady Bowthorpe	Maglietta Fina	Verglas	f	Nassau Stakes (2021)
2016	Mutamakina	Joshua's Princess	Danehill	f	E. P. Taylor Stakes
2016	Kitty's Light	Daraiyna	Refuse To Bend	g	Scottish Grand National (2023)
2017	Quickthorn	Daffydowndilly	Oasis Dream	g	Goodwood Cup
2019	Desert Crown	Desert Berry	Green Desert	c	Epsom Derby
2019	Poptronic	Alpine Dream	Dream Ahead	f	British Champions Fillies and Mares Stakes
2021	You Got To Me	Brushing	Medicean	f	Irish Oaks

== Pedigree ==
Pedigree of Nathaniel (IRE), bay colt, 2008
Sire Galileo (IRE) 1998	Sadler's Wells; 1981	Northern Dancer	Nearctic
Sire Galileo (IRE) 1998	Sadler's Wells; 1981	Northern Dancer	Natalma
Sire Galileo (IRE) 1998	Sadler's Wells; 1981	Fairy Bridge	Bold Reason
Sire Galileo (IRE) 1998	Sadler's Wells; 1981	Fairy Bridge	Special
Sire Galileo (IRE) 1998	Urban Sea; 1989	Miswaki	Mr. Prospector
Sire Galileo (IRE) 1998	Urban Sea; 1989	Miswaki	Hopespringeternal
Sire Galileo (IRE) 1998	Urban Sea; 1989	Allegretta	Lombard
Sire Galileo (IRE) 1998	Urban Sea; 1989	Allegretta	Anatevka
Dam Magnificient Style (USA) 1993	Silver Hawk; 1979	Roberto	Hail to Reason
Dam Magnificient Style (USA) 1993	Silver Hawk; 1979	Roberto	Bramalea
Dam Magnificient Style (USA) 1993	Silver Hawk; 1979	Gris Vitesse	Amerigo
Dam Magnificient Style (USA) 1993	Silver Hawk; 1979	Gris Vitesse	Matchiche
Dam Magnificient Style (USA) 1993	Mia Karina; 1983	Icecapade	Nearctic
Dam Magnificient Style (USA) 1993	Mia Karina; 1983	Icecapade	Shenanigans
Dam Magnificient Style (USA) 1993	Mia Karina; 1983	Basin	Tom Rolfe
Dam Magnificient Style (USA) 1993	Mia Karina; 1983	Basin	Delta (Family: 9-f)
