= Playful Act =

Irish-bred Thoroughbred racehorse

- Sire: Sadler's Wells
- Grandsire: Northern Dancer
- Dam: Magnificient Style
- Damsire: Silver Hawk
- Sex: Mare
- Foaled: 2002
- Country: Ireland
- Colour: Bay
- Breeder: Swettenham Stud
- Owner: 1) Sangster Family; 2) Sheikh Mohammed
- Trainer: John Gosden
- Record: 6: 4–2–0
- Earnings: US$487,191 (Equivalent)

Major wins
- Fillies' Mile (2004); May Hill Stakes (2004); Lancashire Oaks (2005)

Playful Act (foaled April 12, 2002 in Ireland) is a Thoroughbred racehorse and the world's most expensive broodmare. Owned and bred by prominent British owner/breeder Robert Sangster, she was sired by the Champion Sire Sadler's Wells, out of the mare Magnificient Style, a granddaughter of the 1972 Epsom Derby winner, Roberto.

A success in racing at age two, Playful Act had notable wins in the 2004 Fillies' Mile and May Hill Stakes. She raced at age three with her best result a win in the Group 2 Lancashire Oaks and a second-place finish to Shawanda in the Irish Oaks.

Retired to broodmare duty, Playful Act was put up for sale in November 2007 and was purchased by Sheikh Mohammed's Darley Stud operation at the Keeneland breeding stock sale for a world record auction price for a broodmare at US$10.5 million.
