= Willie Ryan (jockey) =

Irish jockey

Willie Ryan (b 22 December 1964) is an ex-flat racing jockey from England who was based in the United Kingdom for most of his career.

Ryan was apprenticed to the trainer Reg Hollinshead and won his first race at Windsor Racecourse in 1982. He was joint British flat racing Champion Apprentice in 1985. He joined Henry Cecil's stable and was second jockey to Steve Cauthen before becoming first jockey in 1993. He won The Derby on Benny the Dip for John Gosden in 1997. In 2004 he was awarded the Flat Jockey Special Recognition Award at the Lester Awards ceremony.

== Major winners ==
(United Kingdom) Great Britain

- Derby - (1) - Benny the Dip (1997)
- Haydock Sprint Cup - (1) - Iktamal (1996)
- Nassau Stakes - (1) - Lyphard's Delta (1993)
- Prince of Wales's Stakes - (1) - Perpendicular (1992)
- Racing Post Trophy - (1) - King's Theatre (1993)

Italy

- Gran Premio del Jockey Club - (1) - Court of Honour (1995)
