= 2007 Epsom Derby =

- Location: Epsom Downs Racecourse
- Date: 2 June 2007
- Winning horse: Authorized
- Starting price: 5/4 fav
- Jockey: Frankie Dettori
- Trainer: Peter Chapple-Hyam
- Owner: Saleh Al Homaizi & Imad Al Sagar

Epsom Derby 2007
1-2-3
Authorized	Eagle Mountain	Aqaleem

Also Ran
4-5-6
Lucarno	Soldier of Fortune	Salford Mill
7-8-9
Kid Mambo	Yellowstone	Acapulco
10-11-12
Admiralofthefleet	Mahler	Anton Chekhov
13-14-15
Regime	Leander	Petara Bay
16-17
Strategic Prince	Archipenko	17 Ran

The 2007 Epsom Derby was a horse race which took place at Epsom Downs on Saturday 2 June 2007. It was the 228th running of the Derby, and it was won by the pre-race favourite Authorized. The winner was ridden by Frankie Dettori and trained by Peter Chapple-Hyam. The race was notable for the fact that eight of the seventeen runners were trained by Aidan O'Brien.

== Race details ==
- Sponsor: Vodafone
- Winner's prize money: £709,750
- Going: Good
- Number of runners: 17
- Winner's time: 2m 34.77s

== Full result ==
	*	Horse	Jockey	Trainer ^{†}	SP
1		Authorized	Frankie Dettori	Peter Chapple-Hyam	5/4 fav
2	5	Eagle Mountain	Johnny Murtagh	Aidan O'Brien (IRE)	6/1
3	2½	Aqaleem	Richard Hills	Marcus Tregoning	9/1
4	hd	Lucarno	Steve Drowne	John Gosden	16/1
5	½	Soldier of Fortune	Wayne Lordan	Aidan O'Brien (IRE)	14/1
6	¾	Salford Mill	Ted Durcan	David Elsworth	20/1
7	1¾	Kid Mambo	Joe Fanning	Terry Mills	50/1
8	nk	Yellowstone	Colm O'Donoghue	Aidan O'Brien (IRE)	28/1
9	3½	Acapulco	Fran Berry	Aidan O'Brien (IRE)	66/1
10	shd	Admiralofthefleet	Seamie Heffernan	Aidan O'Brien (IRE)	14/1
11	6	Mahler	Pat Smullen	Aidan O'Brien (IRE)	20/1
12	2	Anton Chekhov	Declan McDonogh	Aidan O'Brien (IRE)	50/1
13	8	Regime	Martin Dwyer	Michael Bell	20/1
14	2½	Leander	Mark Gallagher	Brett Johnson	100/1
15	1	Petara Bay	Dane O'Neill	Terry Mills	100/1
16	13	Strategic Prince	Eddie Ahern	Paul Cole	20/1
17	4	Archipenko	Michael Kinane	Aidan O'Brien (IRE)	13/2

* The distances between the horses are shown in lengths or shorter. shd = short-head; hd = head; nk = neck.
† Trainers are based in Great Britain unless indicated.

== Winner's details ==
Further details of the winner, Authorized:

- Foaled: 14 February 2004 in Ireland
- Sire: Montjeu; Dam: Funsie (Saumarez)
- Owner: Saleh Al Homaizi and Imad Al Sagar
- Breeder: Marengo Investments, Knighton House Ltd and Michael Kinane
- Rating in 2007 World Thoroughbred Racehorse Rankings: 129

== Form analysis ==
=== Two-year-old races ===
Notable runs by the future Derby participants as two-year-olds in 2006.

- Authorized – 3rd Haynes, Hanson and Clark Stakes, 1st Racing Post Trophy
- Eagle Mountain – 2nd Futurity Stakes, 2nd Champagne Stakes, 1st Beresford Stakes, 4th Racing Post Trophy
- Aqaleem – 2nd Haynes, Hanson and Clark Stakes
- Soldier of Fortune – 2nd Critérium de Saint-Cloud
- Kid Mambo – 2nd Autumn Stakes
- Yellowstone – 7th Futurity Stakes, 3rd Critérium International
- Admiralofthefleet – 3rd Superlative Stakes, 1st Royal Lodge Stakes
- Anton Chekhov – 1st Eyrefield Stakes
- Regime – 2nd Goffs Million, 7th Racing Post Trophy
- Petara Bay – 10th Racing Post Trophy
- Strategic Prince – 5th Norfolk Stakes, 1st July Stakes, 1st Vintage Stakes, 3rd Dewhurst Stakes

=== The road to Epsom ===
Early-season appearances in 2007 and trial races prior to running in the Derby.

- Authorized – 1st Dante Stakes
- Eagle Mountain – 5th 2,000 Guineas
- Aqaleem – 1st Lingfield Derby Trial
- Lucarno – 1st Fairway Stakes
- Soldier of Fortune – 1st Prix Noailles, 1st Chester Vase
- Salford Mill – 2nd Feilden Stakes, 1st Newmarket Stakes
- Kid Mambo – 3rd Lingfield Derby Trial
- Yellowstone – 5th Leopardstown 2,000 Guineas Trial Stakes, 11th 2,000 Guineas, 2nd Derrinstown Stud Derby Trial
- Acapulco – 2nd Newmarket Stakes
- Admiralofthefleet – 7th Leopardstown 2,000 Guineas Trial Stakes, 1st Dee Stakes
- Mahler – 1st Gowran Classic Trial
- Anton Chekhov – 5th Ballysax Stakes, 1st Prix Hocquart
- Regime – 1st Sandown Classic Trial
- Petara Bay – 1st Feilden Stakes, 7th Sandown Classic Trial
- Strategic Prince – 8th 2,000 Guineas
- Archipenko – 1st Derrinstown Stud Derby Trial

=== Subsequent Group 1 wins ===
Group 1 / Grade I victories after running in the Derby.

- Authorized – International Stakes (2007)
- Eagle Mountain – Hong Kong Cup (2008)
- Lucarno – St. Leger (2007)
- Soldier of Fortune – Irish Derby (2007), Coronation Cup (2008)
- Salford Mill (renamed Helene Mascot) – Hong Kong Classic Mile (2008), Hong Kong Derby (2008)
- Archipenko – Queen Elizabeth II Cup (2008)

== Subsequent breeding careers ==
Leading progeny of participants in the 2007 Epsom Derby.

=== Sires of Group/Grade One winners ===
Authorized (1st)

- Santiago - 1st Irish Derby (2020)
- Seal Of Approval - 1st British Champions Fillies and Mares Stakes (2013)
- Nichols Canyon - 1st Stayers' Hurdle (2017)
- Tiger Roll - 1st Grand National (2018, 2019)

=== Sires of Group/Grade One winners ===
Strategic Prince (16th) - Later exported to Argentina

- La Collina - 1st Phoenix Stakes (2011)
- Saent - 1st Derby Italiano (2016)
- Redact - 2nd Derby Italiano (2011)
- Uppertown Prince - 2nd Prestige Novices' Hurdle (2018)

Archipenko (17th)

- Madame Chiang - 1st British Champions Fillies and Mares Stakes (2014)
- Time Warp - 1st Hong Kong Cup (2017)
- Glorious Forever - 1st Hong Kong Cup (2018)
- Va Bank - 3rd Bayerisches Zuchtrennen (2018)

=== Sires of National Hunt horses ===
Lucarno (4th)

- Dame de Compagnie - 1st Coral Cup (2020)
- Darlac - 2nd Winter Novices' Hurdle (2018)

Soldier Of Fortune (5th)

- Early Doors - 2nd Christmas Hurdle (2018)
- Scarpeta - 3rd Festival Novice Hurdle (2018)
- Tin Soldier - 3rd Irish Daily Mirror Novice Hurdle (2017)
- Rey Del Rock - 1st Gran Premio Hipodromo Chile (2016)

Mahler (11th)

- Chris's Dream - 1st Red Mills Chase (2020)
- Ornua - 1st Maghull Novices' Chase (2019)
- Sutton Place - 1st Boyne Hurdle (2017)
- Ms Parfois - 2nd National Hunt Chase Challenge Cup (2018)

=== Other Stallions ===
Eagle Mountain (2nd) - Exported to New Zealand
Salford Mill (6th) (renamed Helene Mascot) - Exported to Australia
Yellowstone (8th) - Flat and jumps winners in France
Leander (14th) - Etheridge Annie (maiden hurdler)
Admiralofthefleet (10th) - Exported to India
