= Santiago (horse) =

Irish Thoroughbred racehorse

- Racing silks of Michael Tabor
- Sire: Authorized
- Grandsire: Montjeu
- Dam: Wadyhatta
- Damsire: Cape Cross
- Sex: Colt
- Foaled: 11 March 2017
- Country: Ireland
- Colour: Bay
- Breeder: Lynch Bages Ltd
- Owner: Michael Tabor, Susan Magnier & Derrick Smith
- Trainer: Aidan O'Brien
- Record: 5: 3-2-0
- Earnings: £444,235

Major wins
- Queen's Vase (2020); Irish Derby (2020)

Santiago (foaled 11 March 2017) is an Irish Thoroughbred racehorse. He showed some promise as a two-year-old in 2019, running second on his first two starts before taking a maiden race on his final appearance of the year. In 2020 he improved when moving up in distance to win the Queen's Vase and the Irish Derby.

== Background ==
Santiago is a bay horse with a white star and snip and three white socks bred in Ireland by Lynch Bages Ltd, a breeding company associated with the Coolmore Stud. Like many Coolmore horses he was owned in partnership by Susan Magnier, Michael Tabor and Derrick Smith. He was sent into training with Aidan O'Brien at Ballydoyle.

He was sired by Authorized who won the Epsom Derby and International Stakes in 2007. Authorized's other offspring have included Nichols Canyon, Hartnell, Seal of Approval, Complacent (Spring Champion Stakes) and Ambivalent (Pretty Polly Stakes). Santiago was the first foal of his dam Wadyhatta who showed modest form in France, winning two minor race in 2015. She was a granddaughter of the Kentucky-bred broodmare Allez Les Trois, making her a close relative of Anabaa Blue, Tamayuz and Urban Sea.

== Racing career ==
=== 2019: two-year-old season ===
Santiago was ridden in all three of his races as a two-year-old by his trainer's son Donnacha O'Brien. The colt made his debut in a maiden race over seven furlongs at Leopardstown Racecourse on 18 July when he started at odds of 8/1 and finished strongly to take second place, half a length behind the favorite Howling Wolf. On 2 August Santiago started 9/4 second favourite for a similar event over the same distance at Galway and came home second of the eleven runners beaten 3 1/4 lengths behind the filly Alpine Star. In a maiden over one mile on soft ground at Listowel Racecourse on 12 September Santiago recorded his first victory as he led for most of the way and won by 1 1/4 lengths from Sunchart at odds of 1/2.

=== 2020: three-year-old season ===
The 2020 flat racing season in England and Ireland was disrupted by the COVID-19 pandemic and Santiago did not make his reappearance until 19 June when he was sent to England to contest the Group 2 Queen's Vase over one mile and six furlongs at Royal Ascot. Ridden by Ryan Moore he went off the 100/30 third choice in the betting behind the filly Born With Pride (winner of the Montrose Stakes) and the Lingfield Derby Trial runner-up Berkshire Rocco in an eight-runner field which also included Al Dabaran (Pat Eddery Stakes). After being restrained by Moore in the early stages, Santiago took the lead two furlongs from the finish and won by almost three lengths from Berkshire Rocco despite hanging to the right in the closing stages. After the race Aidan O'Brien said "He's a lovely straightforward horse. He travelled well and we always thought he would stay well. He's an easy horse to train and an easy horse to get fit. We've been thinking he was an ideal St Leger horse so we'll look for another run somewhere between now and then really... the Irish Derby would come too quick but we'll see what the lads want to do."

Despite O'Brien's misgivings Santiago reappeared for the Irish Derby, which was run "behind closed doors" at the Curragh on 27 June when he was partnered by Seamie Heffernan and went off 2/1 favourite. His thirteen opponents included Crossfirehurricane (Gallinule Stakes), Arthur's Kingdom (second in the King Edward VII Stakes) and the filly New York Girl (winner of the Weld Park Stakes and fourth in the Irish 1,000 Guineas). With no overseas contenders and only three previous Group race winners in attendance the event appeared to be a substandard edition of the classic. In a race run in heavy rain, Santiago settled towards the rear before making progress and switching to the outside in the straight. He took the lead two furlongs out, opened up a clear advantage and kept on well to hold off the challenge of his stablemate Tiger Moth to win by a head. O'Brien who was winning the race for a record fourteenth time and trained the first four finishers said "We're delighted with that. He's a lovely staying type of horse and they went an honest gallop. We thought he might be a St Leger horse and be one to look forward to as a Cup horse next year, and the horses behind him are still babies, so they're there to look forward to as well" while Heffernan commented "He's a tough horse to come back from a mile and six furlongs last week, but the Curragh suited him... This horse has guts, and, if you have guts, you don't always have to be on the best horse in the race".

On 28 July Santiago was moved up in distance to take on top-class older stayers in the two-mile Goodwood Cup in which he was ridden by Moore and went off the 15/8 second choice in the betting. He tracked the front-running Nayef Road before disputing the lead in the straight but was unable to quicken in the closing stages and finished third, beaten a length and a length and a quarter by Stradivarius and Nayef Road.

The 244th running of the St Leger took place behind closed doors over 14 1/2 furlongs at Doncaster Racecourse on 12 September and Santiago, partnered by Frankie Dettori started the 5/2 favourite in an eleven-runner field. He started slowly and raced towards the rear before staying on strongly in the straight to take fourth place behind Galileo Chrome, beaten, 1 1/2 lengths by the winner.

== Pedigree ==
Pedigree of Santiago (IRE), bay colt, 2017
| Sire Authorized (IRE) 2004 | Montjeu (IRE); 1996 | Sadler's Wells (USA) | Northern Dancer (CAN) |
| Sire Authorized (IRE) 2004 | Montjeu (IRE); 1996 | Sadler's Wells (USA) | Fairy Bridge |
| Sire Authorized (IRE) 2004 | Montjeu (IRE); 1996 | Floripedes (FR) | Top Ville (IRE) |
| Sire Authorized (IRE) 2004 | Montjeu (IRE); 1996 | Floripedes (FR) | Toute Cy |
| Sire Authorized (IRE) 2004 | Funsie (FR); 1999 | Saumarez (GB) | Rainbow Quest (USA) |
| Sire Authorized (IRE) 2004 | Funsie (FR); 1999 | Saumarez (GB) | Fiesta Fun |
| Sire Authorized (IRE) 2004 | Funsie (FR); 1999 | Vallee Dansante (USA) | Lyphard |
| Sire Authorized (IRE) 2004 | Funsie (FR); 1999 | Vallee Dansante (USA) | Green Valley (FR) |
| Dam Wadyhatta (GB) 2012 | Cape Cross (IRE); 1994 | Green Desert (USA) | Danzig |
| Dam Wadyhatta (GB) 2012 | Cape Cross (IRE); 1994 | Green Desert (USA) | Foreign Courier |
| Dam Wadyhatta (GB) 2012 | Cape Cross (IRE); 1994 | Park Appeal | Ahonoora (GB) |
| Dam Wadyhatta (GB) 2012 | Cape Cross (IRE); 1994 | Park Appeal | Balidaress |
| Dam Wadyhatta (GB) 2012 | Thamarat (GB); 2003 | Anabaa (USA) | Danzig |
| Dam Wadyhatta (GB) 2012 | Thamarat (GB); 2003 | Anabaa (USA) | Balbonella (FR) |
| Dam Wadyhatta (GB) 2012 | Thamarat (GB); 2003 | Al Ishq (FR) | Nureyev (USA) |
| Dam Wadyhatta (GB) 2012 | Thamarat (GB); 2003 | Al Ishq (FR) | Allez Les Trois (USA) (Family: 9-h) |

- Santiago was inbred 4 × 4 to Danzig, meaning that this stallion appears twice in the fourth generation of his pedigree.
