= Chicquita =

Irish-bred Thoroughbred racehorse

- Racing silks of Paul Makin and Derrick Smith
- Sire: Montjeu
- Grandsire: Sadler's Wells
- Dam: Prudenzia
- Damsire: Dansili
- Sex: Mare
- Foaled: 21 January 2010
- Country: Ireland
- Colour: Bay
- Breeder: Ecurie des Monceaux & Skymarc Farm Inc
- Owner: Paul Makin; Derrick Smith, Susan Magnier & Michael Tabor
- Trainer: Alain de Royer-Dupré; Aidan O'Brien
- Record: 8: 1-2-2
- Earnings: £533,641

Major wins
- Irish Oaks (2013)

Chicquita (foaled 21 January 2010) is an Irish Thoroughbred racehorse and broodmare. Originally trained in France, she was a talented but unpredictable filly with a tendency to swerve left or right in the closing stages of her races. After finishing third in her only race as a two-year-old in 2012, she fell on her three-year-old debut but then proved herself a top-class filly by finishing second to Treve in the Prix de Diane and then winning the Irish Oaks. She was off the course for over a year before returning in 2014 but failed to win in four subsequent races.

== Background ==
Chicquita is a bay mare with no white markings, bred in Ireland by Ecurie des Monceaux & Skymarc Farm Inc. As a yearling in August 2011 the filly was put up for auction and sold for €600,000 to Badgers Bloodstock. She entered the ownership of the Australian Paul Makin and was sent into training in France with Alain de Royer-Dupré. Makin named the filly after a famous Australian racehorse of the 1950s.

She was from the ninth crop of foals sired by Montjeu whose wins included the Prix du Jockey Club, Irish Derby, Prix de l'Arc de Triomphe and King George VI and Queen Elizabeth Stakes. As a breeding stallion his other progeny included Motivator, Authorized, Pour Moi, Camelot, Scorpion, Masked Marvel, Hurricane Fly, St Nicholas Abbey and Hurricane Run. Chicquita is the first foal of her dam Prudenzia who showed considerable ability in a brief racing career highlighted by a victory in the Listed Prix de la Seine in May 2008. She was descended from the French broodmare Faizebad (foaled 1962) who has been the ancestor of many major winners including Doyoun and Alexandrova

== Racing career ==
=== 2012: two-year-old season ===
Chicquita made her racecourse debut in a maiden race over 1800 metres on heavy ground at Longchamp Racecourse and started at odds of 4/1 in an eleven-runner field. Ridden by Stéphane Pasquier she recovered after being hampered soon after the start and finished third behind the Freddy Head-trained Intimhir.

=== 2013: three-year-old season ===
On 24 May 2013 Chicqita began her second season in the Prix Lunadix, a minor stakes race over 2100 metres at Saint-Cloud Racecourse. After leading soon after the start before accelerating away from her seven rivals (headed by Intimhir). Fhe was three lengths clear and looked certain to win when she veered to the right, collided with the hedge bordering the course, and fell 50 metres from the finish. Despite her fall she was then stepped up sharply in class for the Group 1 Prix de Diane at Chantilly Racecourse on 14 June in which she was ridden as at Saint-Cloud by Antoine Hamelin. She started a 25/1 outsider but exceeded expectations as she came from far back in the field to finish second behind Treve despite hanging left in the straight. The unplaced runners included Silasol (Prix Marcel Boussac, Prix Saint-Alary), Esoterique and Flotilla (Breeders' Cup Juvenile Fillies Turf, Poule d'Essai des Pouliches).

Chicquita was then sent to Ireland and moved up in distance for the Irish Oaks over one and a half miles at the Curragh Racecourse on 20 July, with the ride going to the experienced local jockey Johnny Murtagh. The Ribblesdale Stakes winner Riposte (trained by the widow of the recently deceased Henry Cecil) started favourite ahead of The Oaks winner Talent with Chicquita the 9/2 third choice in the betting. The Ballydoyle stable of Aidan O'Brien fielded three runners, namely Venus de Milo (Naas Oaks Trial), Just Pretending (third in the Irish 1,000 Guineas) and Magical Dream (C L Weld Park Stakes) whilst the only other runner was the Jim Bolger-trained Scintillula. Just Pretending set a steady pace with Murtagh settling the French-trained filly in third place. Chicquita began to make progress approaching the final furlong and despite veering to the left in the closing stages she gained the advantage in the final strides and won by half a length and a neck from Venus de Milo and Just Pretending. After the race her trainer Alain de Royer-Dupré said "She never won before this race. I knew she was a top, top filly and we came here because The Curragh is a typical racecourse for this type of filly with a big action. I know she stays. Johnny gave her a good ride because she is not easy you cannot do too much too quickly on her... She could have an exceptional career except for what she does at the end of a race".

In September 2013 Paul Makin announced that he was selling off nearly all of his horses and Chicquita was offered for sale at Goffs in November. She was bought for €6,000,000, a record for a horse sold at auction in Ireland, by the bloodstock agents Peter & Ross Doyle, acting on behalf of John Magnier's Coolmore Stud organisation. She was transferred to the stable of Aidan O'Brien at Ballydoyle.

=== 2014: four-year-old season ===
Chicquita made her first track appearance for well over a year when she contested the Blandford Stakes at the Curragh on 14 September 2014 and finished second to the three-year-old Tarfasha. In the 2014 Prix de l'Arc de Triomphe at Longchamp on 5 October she started a 40/1 outsider and finished fifteenth of the twenty runners behind Treve. Two weeks later she started at odds of 7/1 for the British Champions Fillies & Mares Stakes at Ascot Racecourse in which she was ridden as on her two previous starts by her trainer's son Joseph. After tracking the leaders she took the lead approaching the final furlong but then "threw it away" as she veered to the left and was beaten into third by Madame Chiang and Silk Sari. She ended her racing career with a trip to California for the Breeders' Cup Turf at Santa Anita Park on 1 November in which she faced top-class male opposition. Ridden by Frankie Dettori and racing on a left-handed track for the first time since her three-year-old debut, she finished fifth of the twelve runners behind Main Sequence, Flintshire, Twilight Eclipse and Telescope.

== Pedigree ==
Pedigree of Chicquita (IRE), bay mare, 2010
Sire Montjeu (IRE) 1996	Sadler's Wells (USA); 1981	Northern Dancer	Nearctic
Sire Montjeu (IRE) 1996	Sadler's Wells (USA); 1981	Northern Dancer	Natalma
Sire Montjeu (IRE) 1996	Sadler's Wells (USA); 1981	Fairy Bridge	Bold Reason
Sire Montjeu (IRE) 1996	Sadler's Wells (USA); 1981	Fairy Bridge	Special
Sire Montjeu (IRE) 1996	Floripedes (FR); 1985	Top Ville	High Top
Sire Montjeu (IRE) 1996	Floripedes (FR); 1985	Top Ville	Sega Ville
Sire Montjeu (IRE) 1996	Floripedes (FR); 1985	Toute Cy	Tennyson
Sire Montjeu (IRE) 1996	Floripedes (FR); 1985	Toute Cy	Adele Toumignon
Dam Prudenzia (GB) 2005	Dansili (GB); 1996	Danehill	Danzig
Dam Prudenzia (GB) 2005	Dansili (GB); 1996	Danehill	Razyana
Dam Prudenzia (GB) 2005	Dansili (GB); 1996	Hasili	Kahyasi
Dam Prudenzia (GB) 2005	Dansili (GB); 1996	Hasili	Keralii
Dam Prudenzia (GB) 2005	Platonic (GB); 1999	Zafonic	Gone West
Dam Prudenzia (GB) 2005	Platonic (GB); 1999	Zafonic	Zaizafon
Dam Prudenzia (GB) 2005	Platonic (GB); 1999	Puce	Darshaan
Dam Prudenzia (GB) 2005	Platonic (GB); 1999	Puce	Souk (Family: 21-a)
