= Seal of Approval =

British-bred Thoroughbred racehorse

- Sire: Authorized
- Grandsire: Montjeu
- Dam: Hannda
- Damsire: Dr Devious
- Sex: Mare
- Foaled: 31 March 2009
- Country: United Kingdom
- Colour: Bay
- Breeder: Tim and Tessa Vestey
- Owner: Tim and Tessa Vestey
- Trainer: James Fanshawe
- Record: 11: 4-1-1
- Earnings: £369,135

Major wins
- Chalice Stakes (2013); British Champions Fillies & Mares S. (2013)

Seal of Approval (foaled 31 March 2009) was a British Thoroughbred racehorse and broodmare. She was unraced until the summer of her three-year-old season, and won one minor race from two starts in 2012 before her season was ended by injury. She reached her peak in the following year as she won all three of her completed races, taking the Chalice Stakes and recording an upset victory in the Group 1 British Champions Fillies & Mares Stakes. She failed to win in five races in 2014 and was retired from racing.

== Background ==
Seal of Approval was a bay mare bred and owned by Tim and Tessa Vestey. As a yearling she was put up for auction at Tattersalls in October and sold for 10,000 guineas to the trainer James Fanshawe only to be sold back immediately to the Vesteys for 10,500 guineas. She was trained throughout her racing career by Fanshawe in Newmarket, Suffolk.She usually raced in a hood.

She was sired by Authorized who won The Derby and the International Stakes in 2007. Authorized's other offspring have included Nichols Canyon, Complacent (Spring Champion Stakes), Hartnell and Ambivalent (Pretty Polly Stakes). Seal of Approval's dam Hannda, showed modest racing ability, winning one minor race at Fairyhouse Racecourse in 2005. She is a great-granddaughter of Hazy Idea, the dam of Hittite Glory, making her a close relative of Harzand, Never Bend and Hethersett.

== Racing career ==
=== 2012: three-year-old season ===
Seal of Approval was unraced a two-year-old and made her racecourse debut on 29 June 2012 in a maiden race over ten furlongs at Doncaster Racecourse in which she started at odds of 50/1 and exceeded expectations as she finished second of the eleven runners. Two months later she was made the 11/10 favourite for a maiden over eleven furlongs on the polytrack surface at Kempton Park Racecourse. Ridden by Hayley Turner she tracked the leaders before taking the lead in the closing stages to win by half a length from Wannabe Loved. She lost a shoe in the contest and returned from the race badly injured, with a puncture to the sole of her foot and a chipped pedal bone.

=== 2013: four-year-old season ===
On 3 July, after an absence of more than ten months, Seal of Approval began her 2014 campaign in a handicap race over one and a half miles on the polytrack at Kempton in which she was again partnered by Turner and equipped with a hood for the first time. Carrying 128 pounds and starting at 14/1 she came from well off the pace, took the lead inside the final furlong and won by half a length from Castilo del Diablo. George Baker took the ride when the filly was stepped up in class for the Listed Chalice Stakes at Newbury Racecourse and started the 7/2 second favourite. After struggling to obtain a clear run in the straight she "squeezed" through in the final strides and won by a neck from Songbird.

In the Group 2 Park Hill Stakes at Doncaster in September, Seal of Approval was in fourth place and appeared to be making good progress when she stumbled and fell after clipping the heels of the horse in front a furlong from the finish. Although Turner required immediate treatment, the filly got back to her feet and completed the course, apparently none the worse for the experience. On 19 October on soft ground at Ascot Racecourse she contested the British Champions Fillies & Mares Stakes, a race which had been elevated to Group 1 level for the first time, and started the 16/1 outsider in an eight-runner field. Talent, Hot Snap and Dalkala (Prix de l'Opéra) were made the 7-2 co-favourites with the other runners being Waila (Aphrodite Stakes), Nymphea (Grosser Preis von Berlin), Igugu (Durban July) and Belle de Crecy (Blandford Stakes). Ridden by Baker, Seal of Approval raced in fifth place before being switched to the outside to obtain a clear run in the straight. She took the lead approaching the final furlong and drew clear of the field to win by four lengths from Belle de Crecy.

=== 2014: five-year-old season ===
Seal of Approval made a fairly promising start as a five-year-old when running fourth in the Yorkshire Cup in May but ran poorly and finished unplaced when favourite for the Lancashire Oaks in July. She finished well to take third in the Geoffrey Freer Stakes at Newbury in August and then ran fourth behind Silk Sari when favourite for the Park Hill Stakes. Despite her failure to win in 2014 she was made 4/1 favourite when she attempted to win a second British Champions Fillies & Mares Stakes at Ascot in October, but came home fifth of the ten runners behind the three-year-old Madame Chiang.

== Breeding record ==
Seal of Approval was entered in the Tattersalls December sales in 2014 but was withdrawn before she entered the auction ring.

- Her first foal, a bay filly foaled in 2016 and sired by Dubawi, was bought for 1,100,000 guineas by Godolphin at Tattersalls in October 2017.
- Her second foal was a filly by Gleneagles foaled in 2017.

== Pedigree ==
Pedigree of Seal of Approval (GB), bay mare, 2009
Sire Authorized (IRE) 2004	Montjeu (IRE); 1990	Sadler's Wells (USA)	Northern Dancer (CAN)
Sire Authorized (IRE) 2004	Montjeu (IRE); 1990	Sadler's Wells (USA)	Fairy Bridge
Sire Authorized (IRE) 2004	Montjeu (IRE); 1990	Floripedes (FR)	Top Ville (IRE)
Sire Authorized (IRE) 2004	Montjeu (IRE); 1990	Floripedes (FR)	Toute Cy
Sire Authorized (IRE) 2004	Funsie (FR); 1999	Saumarez (GB)	Rainbow Quest (USA)
Sire Authorized (IRE) 2004	Funsie (FR); 1999	Saumarez (GB)	Fiesta Fun
Sire Authorized (IRE) 2004	Funsie (FR); 1999	Vallee Dansante (USA)	Lyphard
Sire Authorized (IRE) 2004	Funsie (FR); 1999	Vallee Dansante (USA)	Green Valley (FR)
Dam Hannda (IRE) 2002	Dr Devious (IRE); 1989	Ahonoora (GB)	Lorenzaccio
Dam Hannda (IRE) 2002	Dr Devious (IRE); 1989	Ahonoora (GB)	Helen Nichols
Dam Hannda (IRE) 2002	Dr Devious (IRE); 1989	Rose of Jericho (USA)	Alleged
Dam Hannda (IRE) 2002	Dr Devious (IRE); 1989	Rose of Jericho (USA)	Rose Red
Dam Hannda (IRE) 2002	Handaza (IRE); 1994	Be My Guest (USA)	Northern Dancer (CAN)
Dam Hannda (IRE) 2002	Handaza (IRE); 1994	Be My Guest (USA)	What A Treat
Dam Hannda (IRE) 2002	Handaza (IRE); 1994	Hazaradjat	Darshaan (GB)
Dam Hannda (IRE) 2002	Handaza (IRE); 1994	Hazaradjat	Hazy Idea (GB) (family: 21-a)

- Seal of Approval was inbred 4 × 4 to Northern Dancer, meaning that this appears twice in fourth generation of her pedigree.
