= Even So (horse) =

Irish Thoroughbred racehorse

- Sire: Camelot
- Grandsire: Montjeu
- Dam: Breeze Hill
- Damsire: Danehill
- Sex: Filly
- Foaled: 25 April 2017
- Country: Ireland
- Colour: Bay
- Breeder: Lynch Bages
- Owner: Susan Magnier & Mrs Paul Shanahan
- Trainer: Ger Lyons
- Record: 8: 3-0-2
- Earnings: £174,091

Major wins
- Naas Oaks Trial (2020); Irish Oaks (2020)

Even So (foaled 25 April 2017) is an Irish Thoroughbred racehorse. After demonstrating promise as a juvenile in 2019 she showed top-class form in 2020, taking both the Naas Oaks Trial and the Irish Oaks.

== Background ==
Even So is a bay filly with no white markings bred in Ireland by Lynch Bages Ltd, a breeding company associated with the Coolmore Stud. She entered the ownership of Susan Magnier and Mrs Paul Shanahan and was sent into training with Ger Lyons at Dunsany, County Meath. She was ridden in most of her races by Colin Keane.

She was from the third crop of foals sired by Camelot who won the 2000 Guineas and the Epsom Derby in 2012. Even So's dam Breeze Hill little racing ability, failing to win in six starts. She was a half-sister to both Dr Devious and the influential broodmare Rain Flower, whose descendants have included Dancing Rain, Maybe and Saxon Warrior.

== Racing career ==
=== 2019: two-year-old season ===
On her racecourse debut Even So started at odds of 10/1 for a maiden race over seven and a half furlongs at Tipperary Racecourse on 29 August and stayed on well from the rear of the field to finish third behind Blissful and Tasalka. Four weeks later the filly started 5/4 favourite for a maiden over one mile on soft ground at Gowran Park and recorded her first success, winning "comfortably" by three and three quarter lengths from Azila after taking the lead soon after the start.

=== 2020: three-year-old season ===
Even So was moved up in class and matched against older fillies when she made her first appearance of 2020 in the Group 3 Park Express Stakes over one mile at Naas Racecourse on 23 March. She started the 5/6 favourite but after being bumped at the start she came home third behind Lemista and Hamariyna. The Irish flat racing season was then disrupted by the COVID-19 pandemic and Even So did not reappear until 13 June, when she started a 16/1 outsider for the Irish 1000 Guineas at the Curragh and came home fifth behind Peaceful, staying on steadily in the last quarter mile without ever looking likely to win. On 4 July Even So was moved up in distance for the ten furlong Naas Oaks Trial and started 13/8 favourite with the best fancied of her five opponents being the Salsabil Stakes winner Silence Please. She led soon after the start and after being headed by the Aidan O'Brien-trained Laburnum inside the final furlong she rallied to reagin the advantage and won by a neck.

The Irish Oaks run behind closed doors over 1 1/2 miles at the Curragh two weeks after her win at Naas saw Even So stepped up to the highest class and start at odds of 10/1 in an eight-runner field. Cayenne Pepper (runner up to Magical in the Pretty Polly Stakes) started favourite while the other contenders were Ennistymon (second in the Epsom Oaks), Passion (third in the Ribblesdale Stakes), Snow (Munster Oaks), Laburnum, New York Girl (Weld Park Stakes) and Yaxeni. After being settled towards the rear of the field Even So made steady progress on the outside in the straight, overtook the favoured Cayenne Pepper inside the final furlong and drew away to win by two lengths. After the race Colin Keane said "It was very straightforward. I got a lovely pitch and I couldn't believe how well my filly was going between the two and the one pole. She stretched all the way to the line" while Ger Lyons said "I love the Camelot fillies and I liked her from the very get-go. Did I think she was an Oaks filly, no, I didn’t but when she won the trial she earned the right to run. It's strange with no people here but I'll take it. I didn’t take my eyes off her up the straight but I was never in doubt at any stage". Commenting on the fact that most of Coolmore's horses were trained by Aidan O'Brien at Ballydoyle he added "it's good that these owners are now with me, with a good trainer for a change".

After a summer break Even So returned to the track on 13 September at Longchamp Racecourse for the 2400 metres Prix Vermeille, a race which saw her matched against older fillies and mares. She started the 4.9/1 second favourite but after tracking the leaders she was unable to make any progress in the straight and came home sixth behind the four-year-old Tarnawa. On 17 October the filly ended her campaign in the British Champions Fillies and Mares Stakes at Ascot Racecourse and finished fifth behind Wonderful Tonight, beaten more than eight lengths by the winner.

== Pedigree ==
Pedigree of Even So (IRE), bay filly, 2017
Sire Camelot (GB) 2009	Montjeu (IRE); 1996	Sadler's Wells (USA)	Northern Dancer (CAN)
Sire Camelot (GB) 2009	Montjeu (IRE); 1996	Sadler's Wells (USA)	Fairy Bridge
Sire Camelot (GB) 2009	Montjeu (IRE); 1996	Floripedes (FR)	Top Ville (IRE)
Sire Camelot (GB) 2009	Montjeu (IRE); 1996	Floripedes (FR)	Toute Cy
Sire Camelot (GB) 2009	Tarfah (USA); 2001	Kingmambo	Mr Prospector
Sire Camelot (GB) 2009	Tarfah (USA); 2001	Kingmambo	Miesque
Sire Camelot (GB) 2009	Tarfah (USA); 2001	Fickle (GB)	Danehill
Sire Camelot (GB) 2009	Tarfah (USA); 2001	Fickle (GB)	Fade
Dam Breeze Hill (IRE) 2000	Danehill (USA); 1986	Danzig	Northern Dancer (CAN)
Dam Breeze Hill (IRE) 2000	Danehill (USA); 1986	Danzig	Pas de Nom
Dam Breeze Hill (IRE) 2000	Danehill (USA); 1986	Razyana	His Majesty
Dam Breeze Hill (IRE) 2000	Danehill (USA); 1986	Razyana	Spring Adieu (CAN)
Dam Breeze Hill (IRE) 2000	Rose of Jericho (USA); 1984	Alleged	Hoist The Flag
Dam Breeze Hill (IRE) 2000	Rose of Jericho (USA); 1984	Alleged	Princess Pout
Dam Breeze Hill (IRE) 2000	Rose of Jericho (USA); 1984	Rose Red	Northern Dancer (CAN)
Dam Breeze Hill (IRE) 2000	Rose of Jericho (USA); 1984	Rose Red	Cambrienne (FR) (Family: 1-t)

- Even So was inbred 2 × 4 to Danehill, meaning that this stallion appears in both the second and fourth generations of her pedigree.
