= Authorized (horse) =

Irish-bred Thoroughbred racehorse

- Racing silks of Authorized
- Sire: Montjeu
- Grandsire: Sadler's Wells
- Dam: Funsie
- Damsire: Saumarez
- Sex: Stallion
- Foaled: 2004
- Country: Ireland
- Colour: Bay
- Breeder: Marengo Investments & Knighton House Ltd & M Kinane
- Owner: Türkiye Jokey kulübü
- Trainer: Peter Chapple-Hyam
- Record: 7: 4-1-1
- Earnings: £1,286,663

Major wins
- Racing Post Trophy (2006); Dante Stakes (2007); Epsom Derby (2007); International Stakes (2007)

Awards
- European Champion Three-Year-Old Colt (2007); Co-World Champion 3-Yr-Old (2007)
- Last updated on 15 November 2007

Authorized (foaled 14 February 2004) is an Irish-bred and British-trained Thoroughbred racehorse, winner of the 2007 Epsom Derby.

== Background ==
Authorized was foaled on 14 February 2004. He was sired by Montjeu, winner of the Irish Derby, Prix du Jockey Club and Prix de l'Arc de Triomphe in 1999 and the King George VI and Queen Elizabeth Stakes in 2000. His dam, the unraced Funsie, was sired by Saumarez, winner of the Prix de l'Arc de Triomphe in 1990. Funsie was owned by the Irish jockey Mick Kinane, who is one-third of the partnership which bred Authorized. Kinane would go on to ride against Authorized in the 2007 Epsom Derby, finishing last on Archipenko.

Authorized was sold as a foal for 95,000 guineas to Tony Nerses at Tattersalls Newmarket sales in November 2004 and returned there in October 2005 as a yearling to be bought by the Newmarket trainer Peter Chapple-Hyam for 400,000 guineas on behalf of the Kuwaiti businessmen and racing partners Saleh al Homaizi and Imad al Sagar. He was broken in at Fawley House Stud by Danni & Steve O'Neill.

Authorized was trained throughout his career by Peter Chapple-Hyam at his St Gatien stables in Newmarket.

== Racing career ==
=== 2006 ===
Authorized made his racecourse debut at Newbury Racecourse on 15 September 2006, in the one mile Haynes, Hanson and Clark Conditions Stakes. Ridden by Eddie Ahern, he finished third of seven runners behind the winner, Teslin. He was beaten by a head into third by Aqaleem and the Racing Post's assessment of Authorized was that "he is bred to make a better three-year-old and looks sure to improve and win races."

A month later, on 21 October 2006, Authorized returned to Newbury to contest the Group One Racing Post Trophy over one mile. The race was run on heavy going, and Authorized was ridden for the first time by Frankie Dettori, who would go on to ride him in all his remaining races. He won at odds of 25 to 1, by one and three quarter lengths from Charlie Farnsbarns. The odds-on favourite Eagle Mountain finished fourth. Authorized was quoted immediately after the race at 16 to 1 for the 2007 Epsom Derby but this was soon cut to 10 to 1.

=== 2007 ===
Authorized's first run as a three-year-old came in the ten-furlong Dante Stakes at York Racecourse on 17 May. He was sent off 10 to 11 favourite and won by four lengths from Raincoat. It appeared at the time to be the best performance in any of the 2007 Trial races for the Epsom Derby and Authorized was made favourite for the race.

Media attention ahead of the Derby focused on Dettori who, despite winning all the other British Classics at least twice each, had so far failed to win the Derby in 14 attempts. For the race itself, run at Epsom Downs Racecourse on 2 June 2007, Authorized was a clear favourite at odds of 5 to 4, and justified the odds by winning by five lengths in a fast time. Dropped back in the field early on, he came to join the leaders inside the final two furlongs and won comfortably. His winning margin has not been bettered since Slip Anchor won in 1985 and in a faster time than either Motivator in 2005 or Sir Percy in 2006. Eagle Mountain finished second and Aqaleem third. Breeding rights to Authorized were sold to Sheikh Mohammed al Maktoum in June 2007. He was leased back to his owners for the remainder of the 2007 racing season and remained at Peter Chapple-Hyam's stables.

Authorized's third run of 2007 came in the Eclipse Stakes at Sandown Park on 7 July, where attempted to become the first Epsom Derby winner to win the Eclipse since Nashwan in 1989, and the first Epsom Derby winner to win another race of any description since High Chaparral in 2002. He was provided with a pacemaker, Champery, to give him a strong pace in an effort to test the stamina of his closest expected rival, George Washington, but despite beating George Washington he finished second to Notnowcato, who was switched to the stands side of the course by Ryan Moore to exploit the faster ground there.

Authorized returned to the racecourse on 21 August in the Juddmonte International Stakes over an extended ten furlongs at York Racecourse. Sent off the 6 to 4 favourite, he was opposed by six runners including his Eclipse Stakes conqueror, Notnowcato and the King George VI and Queen Elizabeth Stakes winner, Dylan Thomas. Always travelling well, Authorized took the lead just over a furlong out and beat Dylan Thomas by a length. In October 2007, he started 11/10 favourite in the Prix de l'Arc de Triomphe at Longchamp Racecourse in Paris but finished tenth of twelve runners, eleven and a quarter lengths behind winner Dylan Thomas. After the race, he was retired to stud. He had won four of his seven starts and amassed over £1.25million in total prize money.

== Stud career ==
Authorized stood as a stallion for the Darley organisation at Dalham Hall Stud near Newmarket before moving to the Haras de Logis in Normandy in 2014. His first two-year-olds reached the racecourse in 2011. In 2019 the stallion was bought by the Turkish Jockey Club and was exported to stand in Turkey. In 2023 he was bought by Capital Stud in County Kilkenny, Ireland.

Authorized has sired 6 individual Group 1 winners:

- Ambivalent – Pretty Polly Stakes (2013)
- Complacent – Spring Champion Stakes (2013)
- Hartnell – The BMW (2015), Turnbull Stakes (2016), C F Orr Stakes (2018), Epsom Handicap (2018)
- Pounamu – Kingston Town Classic (2017)
- Santiago – Irish Derby (2020)
- Seal of Approval – British Champions Fillies and Mares Stakes (2013)

His National Hunt winners include Nichols Canyon, Tiger Roll and I Am Maximus.

== Pedigree ==
Pedigree of Authorized (IRE), bay stallion, 2004
Sire Montjeu (IRE) 1996	Sadler's Wells; 1981	Northern Dancer	Nearctic
Sire Montjeu (IRE) 1996	Sadler's Wells; 1981	Northern Dancer	Natalma
Sire Montjeu (IRE) 1996	Sadler's Wells; 1981	Fairy Bridge	Bold Reason
Sire Montjeu (IRE) 1996	Sadler's Wells; 1981	Fairy Bridge	Special
Sire Montjeu (IRE) 1996	Floripedes; 1985	Top Ville	High Top
Sire Montjeu (IRE) 1996	Floripedes; 1985	Top Ville	Sega Ville
Sire Montjeu (IRE) 1996	Floripedes; 1985	Toute Cy	Tennyson
Sire Montjeu (IRE) 1996	Floripedes; 1985	Toute Cy	Adele Toumignon
Dam Funsie (FRA) 1999	Saumarez; 1987	Rainbow Quest	Blushing Groom
Dam Funsie (FRA) 1999	Saumarez; 1987	Rainbow Quest	I Will Follow
Dam Funsie (FRA) 1999	Saumarez; 1987	Fiesta Fun	Welsh Pageant
Dam Funsie (FRA) 1999	Saumarez; 1987	Fiesta Fun	Antigua
Dam Funsie (FRA) 1999	Vallee Dansante; 1981	Lyphard	Northern Dancer
Dam Funsie (FRA) 1999	Vallee Dansante; 1981	Lyphard	Goofed
Dam Funsie (FRA) 1999	Vallee Dansante; 1981	Green Valley	Val de Loir
Dam Funsie (FRA) 1999	Vallee Dansante; 1981	Green Valley	Sly Pola (Family: 16)
