= Chalice Stakes =

Flat horse race in Britain

Chalice Stakes
2026
| Romantic Symphony | Francophone | Revoir |

Previous years
2024
Divina Grace | Place Of Safety | Fairy Glen
2023
Sweet Memories | Sunset Point | Climate Friendly
2022
Emotion | Rose Of Kildare | Star Fortress
2021
Save A Forest | Sayyida | Portfolio

2020-2011
2020
Katara | Expressionism | Cosmic Princess
2019
Love So Deep | Bella Vita | Shambolic
2018
Crimson Rosette | Alwaysandforever | Galmarley
2017
To Eternity | Pleasant Surprise | Fleur Forsyte
2016
Fireglow | Abingdon | Tiptree
2015
Gretchen | Sahrawi | Asyad
2014
Silk Sari | Moment In Time | Cascading
2013
Seal Of Approval | Songbird | Cushion
2012
Ambivalent | Set To Music | Khione
2011
Sea Of Heartbreak | Mirror Lake | Cill Rialaig

2010-2000
2010
Pachattack | Shimmering Surf | Saphira's Fire
2009
Polly's Mark | Fallen In Love | Rosaleen
2008
Suzi's Decision | Ronaldsay | Presbyterian Nun
2007
Queen's Best | Wassfa | Mont Etoile
2006
Fermion | Reunite | Intrigued
2005
Punctilious | Natalie Jane | Aunt Julia
2004
Sahool | Polar Jem | Selebela
2003
Floreeda | El Laoob | Miss Corniche
2002
Love Everlasting | Salim Toto | Bright And Clear
2001
Love Everlasting | Nafisah | Darandala
2000
Miss Lorilaw | Farfala | Film Script

The Chalice Stakes is a Listed flat horse race in Great Britain open to mares and fillies aged three years or older. It is run at Newmarket over a distance of 1 mile and 4 furlongs (2,414 metres), and it is scheduled to take place each year in August.

The race was first run in 2000.

Between 2000 and 2014 the race was run at Newbury before moving to Newmarket in 2015.

== Records ==
Most successful horse (2 wins):

- Love Everlasting (2001, 2002)

Leading jockey (3 wins):

- Andrea Atzeni – Ambivalent (2012), Silk Sari (2014), Emotion (2022)
- Billy Loughnane - Divina Grace (2024), Silent Love (2025), Romantic Symphony (2026)

Leading trainer (4 wins):

- John Gosden - Gretchen (2015), To Eternity (2017), Emotion (2022), Sweet Memories (2023)

== Winners ==
| Year | Winner | Age | Jockey | Trainer | Time |
|---|---|---|---|---|---|
| 2000 | Miss Lorilaw | 3 | Michael Hills | Charles Hills | 2:31.23 |
| 2001 | Love Everlasting | 3 | Joe Fanning | Mark Johnston | 2:31.14 |
| 2002 | Love Everlasting | 4 | Kevin Darley | Mark Johnston | 2:34.28 |
| 2003 | Floreeda | 3 | Willie Ryan | Henry Cecil | 2:31.79 |
| 2004 | Sahool | 3 | Richard Hills | Marcus Tregoning | 2:30.29 |
| 2005 | Punctilious | 4 | Kerrin McEvoy | Saeed bin Suroor | 2:33.55 |
| 2006 | Fermion | 3 | Colm O'Donoghue | Aidan O'Brien | 2:31.14 |
| 2007 | Queen's Best | 4 | Ryan Moore | Michael Stoute | 2:30.83 |
| 2008 | Suzi's Decision | 3 | John Egan | Paul D'Arcy | 2:32.83 |
| 2009 | Polly's Mark | 3 | William Buick | Clive Cox | 2:36.56 |
| 2010 | Pachattack | 4 | Tom Queally | Gerard Butler | 2:32.69 |
| 2011 | Sea Of Heartbreak | 4 | Steve Drowne | Roger Charlton | 2:33.22 |
| 2012 | Ambivalent | 3 | Andrea Atzeni | Roger Varian | 2:34.96 |
| 2013 | Seal of Approval | 4 | George Baker | James Fanshawe | 2:30.89 |
| 2014 | Silk Sari | 4 | Andrea Atzeni | Luca Cumani | 2:34.93 |
| 2015 | Gretchen | 3 | Robert Havlin | John Gosden | 2:31.63 |
| 2016 | Fireglow | 3 | Silvestre de Sousa | Mark Johnston | 2:33.09 |
| 2017 | To Eternity | 4 | James Doyle | John Gosden | 2:34.03 |
| 2018 | Crimson Rosette | 4 | Stevie Donohoe | Charlie Fellowes | 2:30.63 |
| 2019 | Love So Deep | 3 | John Egan | Jane Chapple-Hyam | 2:31.76 |
| 2020 | Katara | 3 | Oisin Murphy | Sir Michael Stoute | 2:27.26 |
| 2021 | Save A Forest | 3 | Callum Shepherd | Roger Varian | 2:27.36 |
| 2022 | Emotion | 3 | Andrea Atzeni | John & Thady Gosden | 2:31.64 |
| 2023 | Sweet Memories | 3 | Hollie Doyle | John & Thady Gosden | 2:40.14 |
| 2024 | Divina Grace | 4 | Billy Loughnane | Rae Guest | 2:29.10 |
| 2025 | Silent Love | 3 | Billy Loughnane | Charlie Appleby | 2:31.52 |
| 2026 | Romantic Symphony | 3 | Billy Loughnane | Charlie Appleby | 2:29.03 |

== See also ==
- Horse racing in Great Britain
- List of British flat horse races
