= Callum Shepherd =

British jockey (born 1997)

- Occupation: Jockey
- Born: 5 August 1997; Brighton, East Sussex
- Nationality: British

Callum Shepherd（born 1997）is a Group race winning British jockey who competes in flat racing.

== Background ==
Shepherd was born in Brighton, in 1997, the son of two lawyers. He took part in pony racing, and rode out for trainers during school holidays. He left Lancing College after taking his GCSEs, and became apprenticed to trainer Charlie Hills in Lambourn. Shepherd's twin brother Laird is a golfer who won The Amateur Championship in 2021.

== Racing career ==
In 2020, Shepherd moved from Lambourn to Newmarket, Suffolk, having been retained by owners the Gredley family. That season he rode 77 winners. He had his first opportunity to ride in a Group 1 race and a British Classic in the 2021 Oaks on Save A Forest, a 40/1 outsider owned by the Gredley family and trained by Roger Varian. The pair came fourth, and then went on to win the listed Chalice Stakes at Newmarket the following month. During the winter of 2023/24 Shepherd rode in Bahrain, where his successes included winning the Bahrain Triple Crown on Isle of Jura for trainer George Scott. In May 2024, he achieved his first victory in a Group race when Seven Questions, trained by Scott, won the Group 3 Palace House Stakes at Newmarket. The same month, he won the Lingfield Derby Trial on Ambiente Friendly for trainer James Fanshawe and was looking forward to a first ride in the Derby on the same horse but was disappointed when the Gredley owners opted for the more experienced Robert Havlin. Ambiente Friendly went on to take second place in the Derby, having started as second favourite. Shepherd secured his first Royal Ascot success in 2024, when he partnered Isle of Jura to victory in the Group 2 Hardwicke Stakes. In 2025 he won Czech Derby on filly Miss Of Change.
