= Punctilious =

British-bred Thoroughbred racehorse

- Sire: Danehill
- Grandsire: Danzig
- Dam: Robertet
- Damsire: Roberto
- Sex: Mare
- Foaled: 7 May 2001
- Country: United Kingdom
- Colour: Bay
- Breeder: Björn Nielsen
- Owner: Björn Nielsen; Godolphin Racing
- Trainer: Michael Jarvis; Saeed bin Suroor
- Record: 15: 6–2–2
- Earnings: £476,835

Major wins
- Musidora Stakes (2004); Ribblesdale Stakes (2004); Chalice Stakes (2005); Yorkshire Oaks (2005)

Punctilous (foaled 7 May 2001) is a British Thoroughbred racehorse and broodmare. Bred in England by Björn Nielsen she showed very promising form as a juvenile in 2003, winning her first two starts before finishing third in the Fillies' Mile. In the following year she developed into a top-class middle distance performer, winning the Musidora Stakes and the Ribblesdale Stakes as well as finishing second in the Irish Oaks and the E. P. Taylor Stakes, third in The Oaks and fourth in the Yorkshire Oaks. In 2005 she made little impact in her first two starts but then won the Chalice Stakes before recording her biggest victory in the Yorkshire Oaks. She was retired from racing at the end of the year to become a broodmare.

== Background ==
Punctilious is a bay mare with a white star bred in the United Kingdom by her owner Bjorn Nielsen. She was sired by Danehill a highly successful breeding stallion who sired the winners of more than a thousand races, including one hundred and fifty-six at Group One/Grade I level. Among his best offspring were Dylan Thomas, Rock of Gibraltar, George Washington and North Light.

Punctilious's dam Robertet was a high-class staying racemare who recorded her biggest win in the Grand Prix de Deauville as a four-year-old in 1990. Apart from Punctilious she produced Risk Seeker whose wins included the Sagaro Stakes, the Prix de Lutèce and the Prix Berteux. Robertet was descendant of Equal Venture, a full-sister to the American Triple Crown winner Assault.

In November 2002, Punctilious was offered for sale at Tattersalls but was retained by her owner when the bidding failed to reach the reserve price of 190,000 guineas. She was sent into training with Michael Jarvis at Newmarket, Suffolk.

== Racing career ==
=== 2003: two-year-old season ===
In her first season Punctilious was ridden in all of her races by Philip Robinson. On her debut she started favourite for a six-runner maiden race over seven furlongs at Yarmouth Racecourse on 3 July and won by two lengths despite pulling hard against Robinson's attempts to restrain her in the early stages. After a two-month break, she returned in a minor event over one mile at Salisbury Racecourse and started the 8/11 favourite against six opponents. She led from the start and won by one and three quarter lengths from Fantastic View. Explaining the filly's absence, Jarvis said "She had a little illness, a viral infection, after she won on her debut, and her blood wasn't right. She has really only just got over it, so she has done very well".

Shortly after her Salisbury win, Punctilious was bought privately by Sheikh Mohammed's Godolphin Racing. The filly was moved up in class for the Group One Fillies' Mile at Ascot Racecourse on 27 September and was made the 13/8 favourite. After leading for most of the way, she was overtaken in the final furlong and finished third beaten one and a quarter lengths and a short head by Red Bloom and Sundrop.

=== 2004: three-year-old season ===
For the 2004 season, Punctilious was moved to the stable of Saeed bin Suroor and was ridden in all of her races by Frankie Dettori. She began her season at York Racecourse on 11 May when she contested the Musidora Stakes, a major trial race for The Oaks. Starting the 8/11 favourite she led from the start, accelerated clear of her five opponents in the straight and won by six lengths from Glen Innes despite swishing her tail in the closing stages. After the race Dettori said "I didn't want to be too hard on her because some of them have been needing their first run. I thought she did it very well even though she was looking about a bit. But that's just her, she's quirky".

On 4 June Punctilious was one of seven fillies to contest the 226th running of the Oaks at Epsom Downs Racecourse and was ridden by Dettori who opted to ride her in preference to Sundrop who had finished runner-up in the 1000 Guineas. Starting the 100/30 third favourite behind All Too Beautiful and Sundrop, she took the lead at half way but was overtaken in the straight and tired in the closing stages to finish third behind Ouija Board and All Too Beautiful. Two weeks later the filly appeared at Royal Ascot in the Ribblesdale Stakes and started 9/2 second favourite behind the Michael Stoute-trained Quiff. The other contenders included Hidden Hope (winner of the Cheshire Oaks) and Rave Reviews (Fillies' Trial Stakes). Dettori tracked the leader Sahool before sending Punctilious into the lead a furlong from the finish. The filly extended her advantage in the closing stages to win by one and a half lengths from Sahool with Quiff a further length and a half away in third and New Morning in fourth. Dettori commented "At least we've put the Oaks run to bed now. It was obvious she didn't act there because her legs were going everywhere. She hated the track, but she's very clever – as well as being tough – and pulled herself up. ... At Epsom, people said our filly didn't stay, but that's not true. I kicked today and I thought, 'Come and get me' because I knew she stayed".

On 18 July Punctilious was sent to Ireland for the Irish Oaks at the Curragh Racecourse. Starting the 5/1 third favourite, she took the lead in the straight but was overtaken approaching the final furlong and beaten a length into second place by Ouija Board, with Hazarista taking third ahead of All Too Beautiful. On her next appearance, Punctilious started 6/4 favourite for the Yorkshire Oaks in a field which included Quiff, Hazarista and Sahool. Racing on soft ground, she led until half way but tired in the straight and finished fourth of the eight runners, more than twenty lengths behind the winner Quiff.

For her final appearance of 2004, Punctilious was sent to Canada to contest the E. P. Taylor Stakes at Woodbine Racetrack on 24 October. After racing in fifth place she took the lead in the straight but was overtaken in the closing stages and beaten half a length by the Bobby Frankel-trained four-year-old Commercante.

=== 2005: four-year-old season ===
Punctilious began her third season in an exceptionally strong renewal of the Group Three Brigadier Gerard Stakes over ten furlongs at Sandown Park Racecourse on 31 May and finished last of the five runners behind New Morning, North Light, Mubtaker and Grand Passion. The Australian Kerrin McEvoy took over from Dettori when the filly started 5/2 favourite for the Lancashire Oaks at Haydock Park on 2 July and finished seventh of the eight runners behind Playful Act. At the end of the month Punctilious was dropped in class for the Listed Chalice Stakes at Newbury Racecourse. Starting the 15/8 favourite, she was held up by McEvoy towards the rear of the eight-runner field before taking the lead in the last quarter mile and winning by two lengths from the three-year-old Natalie Jane.

On 17 August, Punctilious made her second attempt to win the Yorkshire Oaks and started at odds of 13/2 in an eleven-runner field. Playful Act started favourite ahead of the Epsom Oaks winner Eswarah and the French-trained Shamdala. The other runners included Iota (Preis der Diana) from Germany, Dash To The Top (Hoppings Stakes), Lune d'Or (Premio Lydia Tesio) and Hazarista. Punctilious started slowly and was not among the early leaders but began to make progress in the straight. The German filly Iota, who had led for most of the race gave way to Dash To The Top a furlong out, but Punctilous was staying on well and hit the front in the closing stages and won by half a length from Dash To The Top. Lune d'Or finished third ahead of Eswarah, Iota and Shamdala. Godolphin's racing manager Simon Crisford said "This filly is thoroughly honest and fully deserved this win". Kerrin McEvoy commented "She was one of the top 3-year-olds last year and we've got her back now. She's even better than last year and she's going great guns".

Punctilious was moved up in distance in September for the Park Hill Stakes over fourteen and a half furlongs. Ridden by Dettori, she started slowly as usual before staying on in the straight and finishing fourth of the eleven runners behind Sweet Stream. On 23 October, Punctilious made her second attempt to win the E. P. Taylor Stakes. She started slowly, losing several lengths at the start and was never in contention, finishing tenth of the twelve runners behind Honey Ryder.

== Breeding record ==
Punctilious was retired from racing to become a broodmare for Sheikh Mohammed's Darley Stud. As of 2015, he has produced four named foals, three of whom have won races:

- Punctilio, a bay filly, foaled in 2008, sired by Kingmambo. Unraced.
- Periphery, bay colt, 2009, by Elusive Quality. Won two races in the United Arab Emirates.
- Omotesando, bay colt (later gelded), 2010, by Street Cry. Won three races in Britain.
- Pallister, bay colt, 2012, by Pivotal. Won two races in Britain.

== Pedigree ==
Pedigree of Punctilious (GB), bay mare, 2001
| Sire Danehill (USA) 1986 | Danzig (USA); 1977 | Northern Dancer | Nearctic |
| Sire Danehill (USA) 1986 | Danzig (USA); 1977 | Northern Dancer | Natalma* |
| Sire Danehill (USA) 1986 | Danzig (USA); 1977 | Pas de Nom | Admiral's Voyage |
| Sire Danehill (USA) 1986 | Danzig (USA); 1977 | Pas de Nom | Petitioner |
| Sire Danehill (USA) 1986 | Rayzana (USA); 1981 | His Majesty | Ribot |
| Sire Danehill (USA) 1986 | Rayzana (USA); 1981 | His Majesty | Flower Bowl |
| Sire Danehill (USA) 1986 | Rayzana (USA); 1981 | Spring Adieu | Buckpasser |
| Sire Danehill (USA) 1986 | Rayzana (USA); 1981 | Spring Adieu | Natalma* |
| Dam Robertet (USA) 1986 | Roberto (USA); 1969 | Hail To Reason | Turn-To |
| Dam Robertet (USA) 1986 | Roberto (USA); 1969 | Hail To Reason | Nothirdchance |
| Dam Robertet (USA) 1986 | Roberto (USA); 1969 | Bramalea | Nashua |
| Dam Robertet (USA) 1986 | Roberto (USA); 1969 | Bramalea | Rarelea |
| Dam Robertet (USA) 1986 | Ethica (USA); 1982 | Nijinsky | Northern Dancer |
| Dam Robertet (USA) 1986 | Ethica (USA); 1982 | Nijinsky | Flaming Page |
| Dam Robertet (USA) 1986 | Ethica (USA); 1982 | Fairness | Cavan |
| Dam Robertet (USA) 1986 | Ethica (USA); 1982 | Fairness | Equal Venture (Family: 4-c) |

- Like all of Danehill's offspring Punctilious is inbred 4 × 4 to the mare Natalma. This means that she occurs twice in the fourth generation of her pedigree.
