= Sky High Stakes =

- Class: Group 3
- Location: Rosehill Gardens Racecourse
- Inaugurated: 1989
- Race type: Thoroughbred
- Sponsor: Asahi Super Dry (2025 and 2026)

Race information
- Distance: 2,000 metres
- Surface: Turf
- Track: Right-handed
- Qualification: Three years old and older
- Weight: Set Weights plus Penalties
- Purse: $350,000 (2026)

The Sky High Stakes is an Australian Turf Club Group 3 Thoroughbred horse race, for three year olds and older, over a distance of 2000 metres, under set weights with penalties conditions at Rosehill Gardens Racecourse in Sydney, Australia in March.

== History ==
The race is named in honour of the Australian Thoroughbred racehorse and sire, Sky High, who won the 1960 Golden Slipper Stakes and 1961 Epsom Handicap.

Recent multiple winners of the race include:

Jockeys

- Glen Boss in 2003, 2004 and 2011.
- James McDonald in 2015, 2023 and 2024.

Trainers

- John Hawkes in 2007 as well as in partnership with Michael & Wayne Hawkes in 2014 and 2020.
- Gai Waterhouse in 2002, 2003, 2011 and 2013 as well as in partnership with Adrian Bott in 2025 and 2026.

=== Name ===
- 1992–2005 - Sky High Quality Stakes
- 2006 - The Roxy Hotel Parramatta Stakes
- 2007 onwards - Sky High Stakes

=== Grade ===
- Prior 1991 - Handicap (Unlisted race)
- 1992–2013 - Listed race
- 2014 onwards - Group 3

=== Distance ===
- Prior 2014 - 1900 metres
- 2015 - 2000 metres

=== Venue ===
In 2008 the race was held at Canterbury Park Racecourse.

=== Conditions ===
In 2016 the race was changed from a Quality handicap to Set Weights plus Penalties conditions.

== Winners ==
The following are the past winners of the race.

- 2026 - Vauban
- 2025 - Vauban
- 2024 - Lindermann
- 2023 - Protagonist
- 2022 - Stockman
- 2021 - Toffee Tongue
- 2020 - Master Of Wine
- 2019 - Red Cardinal
- 2018 - Auvray
- 2017 - Tavago
- 2016 - Sir John Hawkwood
- 2015 - Hartnell
- 2014 - Entirely Platinum
- 2013 - Julienas
- 2012 - Single
- 2011 - Older Than Time
- 2010 - Bellagio Wynn
- 2009 - Kettledrum
- 2008 - Nuclear Sky
- 2007 - Coalesce
- 2006 - County Tyrone
- 2005 - Seul Amour
- 2004 - Daniel's The Man
- 2003 - National Treasure
- 2002 - Restless
- 2001 - Bello Signor
- 2000 - Spysept
- 1999 - For The Moment
- 1998 - Joss Sticks
- 1997 - Buzzoff
- 1996 - Darbaas
- 1995 - Balmeressa
- 1994 - Cross Swords
- 1993 - Upwards
- 1992 - Native Neptune
- 1991 - String Quartet
- 1990 - Galligaskins
- 1989 - Eye Of The Sky

== See also ==
- List of Australian Group races
- Group races
