= Hartnell (horse) =

British-bred Thoroughbred racehorse

- Sire: Authorized (IRE)
- Grandsire: Montjeu (IRE)
- Dam: Debonnaire (GB)
- Damsire: Anabaa (USA)
- Sex: Gelding
- Foaled: 2011
- Country: Great Britain
- Colour: Bay
- Breeder: Darley (GB)
- Owner: Godolphin
- Trainer: Mark Johnston (2013-2014); John O'Shea (2015-2017); James Cummings (2017-2019)
- Record: 58:13–14–9
- Earnings: A$ 7,469,499

Major wins
- Zetland Stakes (2013); Queen's Vase (2014); Bahrain Trophy (2014); Sky High Stakes (2015); The BMW (2015); Chelmsford Stakes (2016); Hill Stakes (2016); Turnbull Stakes (2016); P B Lawrence Stakes (2017); C F Orr Stakes (2018); Epsom Handicap (2018)
- Last updated on 6 October 2019

Hartnell (foaled 19 April 2011) is a retired British bred thoroughbred racehorse that won four Group 1 races in Australia.

Hartnell is well known for his rivalry with champion horse Winx. The pair faced each other seven times with Hartnell finishing runner up on three occasions.

== Racing career ==
Foaled at Rutland Stud, on the outskirts of Newmarket, Hartnell began his racing career with Mark Johnston. After winning the Queen's Vase he was shipped to Australia to continue racing.

In Australia, Hartnell won four Group 1 races, The BMW (2015), Turnbull Stakes (2016), C F Orr Stakes (2018) and the Epsom Handicap (2018).

Hartnell was retired from racing after finishing third in the 2019 Mackinnon Stakes. He will join Godolphin's Lifetime Care program to be retrained, most likely as a show horse.

Hartnell made his equestrian debut in 2021 and was successful in the Rising Star Thoroughbred Class event. His new owner Sheralee Patterson was surprised by his victory stating, “It was his first day out pretty much. What he's done today has blown me away, I can't believe how relaxed he is. To go out in his first class in such a big arena with so many horses and then to go on and win it was just...I was lost for words.”

== Pedigree ==
Pedigree of Hartnell (GB) 2011
Sire Authorized (IRE) 2004	Montjeu (IRE); 1996	Sadler's Wells	Northern Dancer
Sire Authorized (IRE) 2004	Montjeu (IRE); 1996	Sadler's Wells	Fairy Bridge
Sire Authorized (IRE) 2004	Montjeu (IRE); 1996	Floripedes	Top Ville
Sire Authorized (IRE) 2004	Montjeu (IRE); 1996	Floripedes	Toute Cy
Sire Authorized (IRE) 2004	Funsie (FR); 1999	Saumarez	Rainbow Quest
Sire Authorized (IRE) 2004	Funsie (FR); 1999	Saumarez	Fiesta Fun
Sire Authorized (IRE) 2004	Funsie (FR); 1999	Vallee Dansante	Lyphard
Sire Authorized (IRE) 2004	Funsie (FR); 1999	Vallee Dansante	Green Valley
Dam Debonnaire (GB) 2005	Anabaa (USA); 1992	Danzig	Northern Dancer
Dam Debonnaire (GB) 2005	Anabaa (USA); 1992	Danzig	Pas De Nom
Dam Debonnaire (GB) 2005	Anabaa (USA); 1992	Balbonella	Gay Mecene
Dam Debonnaire (GB) 2005	Anabaa (USA); 1992	Balbonella	Bamieres
Dam Debonnaire (GB) 2005	Ultra Finesse (USA); 1992	Rahy	Blushing Groom
Dam Debonnaire (GB) 2005	Ultra Finesse (USA); 1992	Rahy	Glorious Song
Dam Debonnaire (GB) 2005	Ultra Finesse (USA); 1992	Suavite	Alleged
Dam Debonnaire (GB) 2005	Ultra Finesse (USA); 1992	Suavite	Guineveres Folly
