= Peter Chapple-Hyam =

British horse trainer

Peter Chapple-Hyam (born 2 April 1963 in Leamington Spa, Warwickshire, England) is a Thoroughbred racehorse trainer. He trained Dr Devious to win The Derby in 1992 and repeated the feat with Authorized in 2007. He managed two Group One wins in his first season as a trainer in 1991. Away from racing he is a keen supporter of West Bromwich Albion F.C.

Chapple-Hyam trained in Hong Kong between 1999 and 2003.

== Major wins ==
(United Kingdom) Great Britain

- 2,000 Guineas - (1) - Rodrigo de Triano (1992)
- Champion Stakes - (2) - Rodrigo de Triano (1992), Spectrum (1995)
- Derby - (2) - Dr Devious (1992), Authorized (2007)
- Dewhurst Stakes - (1) - Dr Devious (1991)
- International Stakes - (2) - Rodrigo de Triano (1992), Authorized (2007)
- Middle Park Stakes - (2) - Rodrigo de Triano (1991), Dutch Art (2006)
- Racing Post Trophy - (3) - Commander Collins (1998), Authorized (2006), Marcel (2015)

France

- Critérium de Saint-Cloud - (1) - Polaris Flight (1995)
- Grand Critérium - (1) - Revoque (1996)
- Poule d'Essai des Poulains - (1) - Victory Note (1998)
- Prix de l'Abbaye de Longchamp - (1) - Carmine Lake (1997)
- Prix du Cadran - (1) - Chief Contender (1997)
- Prix Morny - (1) - Dutch Art (2006)
- Prix de la Salamandre - (1) - Revoque (1996)

(Republic of Ireland) Ireland

- Irish 2,000 Guineas - (3) - Rodrigo de Triano (1992), Turtle Island (1994), Spectrum (1995)
- Irish Champion Stakes - (1) - Dr Devious (1992)
- Phoenix Stakes - (1) - Turtle Island (1993)

Italy

- Derby Italiano - (2) - White Muzzle (1993), Single Empire (1997)
- Gran Premio d'Italia - (1) - Close Conflict (1994)
- Gran Premio del Jockey Club - (1) - Court of Honour (1995)
- Premio Parioli - (1) - Prince Arthur (1995)
