= Nichols Canyon (horse) =

British-bred Thoroughbred racehorse

- Racing silks of Rachel Hood and Graham Wylie
- Sire: Authorized
- Grandsire: Montjeu
- Dam: Zam Zoom
- Damsire: Dalakhani
- Sex: Gelding
- Foaled: 11 February 2010
- Died: 28 December 2017 (aged 7)
- Country: United Kingdom
- Colour: Bay
- Breeder: Rabbah Bloodstock Limited
- Owner: Rachel Hood & Elaine Lawlor; Andrea & Graham Wylie
- Trainer: John Gosden; Willie Mullins
- Record: 30:12-6-7; 20:9-3-5 (Hurdles); 10:3-3-2 (Flat racing)
- Earnings: £706,551

Major wins
- Noel Murless Stakes (2013); Prix Denisy (2013); Royal Bond Novice Hurdle (2014); Deloitte Novice Hurdle (2015); Mersey Novices' Hurdle (2015); Champion Novice Hurdle (2015); Morgiana Hurdle (2015, 2016); December Festival Hurdle (2015); Stayers' Hurdle (2017)

Nichols Canyon (11 February 2010 – 28 December 2017) was a British-bred Thoroughbred racehorse best known for his performances in National Hunt races. He showed good form on the flat before emerging as an outstanding performer in hurdle races. In his first two seasons of competition he raced on the flat and won three of his ten races including the Noel Murless Stakes and the Prix Denisy as well as finishing second in the St Simon Stakes.

When transferred to Ireland to compete under National Hunt rules he made an immediate impact, winning five races in his novice season including four Grade 1 victories in the Royal Bond Novice Hurdle, Deloitte Novice Hurdle, Mersey Novices' Hurdle and Champion Novice Hurdle. In the following season he won the Morgiana Hurdle, becoming the first horse to defeat Faugheen and then recorded his sixth Grade I success in the December Festival Hurdle.

In the following season he won a second Morgiana Hurdle and was then stepped up in distance to win the Stayers' Hurdle. On 28 December 2017 Nichols Canyon was fatally injured in a fall at Leopardstown.

== Background ==
Nichols Canyon was a small bay gelding with no white markings bred in the United Kingdom by Rabbah Bloodstock Limited. He was from the second crop of foals sired by Authorized who won The Derby and the International Stakes in 2007. His other offspring have included Seal of Approval (British Champions Fillies' and Mares' Stakes), Complacent (Spring Champion Stakes), Hartnell (Tancred Stakes) and Ambivalent (Pretty Polly Stakes). Nichols Canyon's dam Zam Zoom was an unraced mare bred by Sheikh Mohammed's Darley Stud, and was a granddaughter of Lucayan Princess, the dam of the multiple Group One winner Luso.

In October 2011, the yearling colt was offered for sale at Tattersalls and was bought for 48,000 Guinea by Blandford Bloodstock. The colt entered the ownership of Rachel Hood & Elaine Lawlor and was sent into training with Hood's husband John Gosden. He was named after Nichols Canyon, Los Angeles.

== Racing career ==
=== 2012 & 2013: Flat racing ===
Nichols Canyon began his racing career by finishing second in a maiden race over one mile at Sandown Park Racecourse on 9 August 2012 and then came third in a similar event over the same course and distance in September. He recorded his first success in October when he was ridden by William Buick to a two length victory in a nine furlong maiden race at Goodwood Racecourse on 14 October.

He began his second season by finishing third in a handicap race at Sandown in April and then finished second in a similar event over eleven furlongs at Newbury Racecourse in May. Nichols Canyon was then moved up in class and finished unplaced in both the Queen's Vase at Royal Ascot in June at the Great Voltigeur Stakes at York in August. On 4 October he started at odds of 5/1 in the Listed Noel Murless Stakes over one and three quarter miles at Ascot and recorded his first important success as he won by two lengths from the Luca Cumani-trained Greatwood. Nichols Canyon started favourite for the Group Three St Simon Stakes at Newbury later that month, but after taking the lead in the straight he was overtaken and beaten by the four-year-old Cubanita. The subsequent Dubai World Cup winner Prince Bishop finished tailed-off in last place. The horse ended his season with a trip to France for the Listed Prix Denisy over 3100 metres at Saint-Cloud Racecourse on 14 November. Ridden by Olivier Peslier he took the lead 200 metres from the finish and drew away to win by four lengths from the six-year-old gelding Inis Meain.

=== 2014/2015 National Hunt season: Novice hurdles ===
At the end of his flat racing career Nichols Canyon was sold to Andrea & Graham Wylie. He was gelded and transferred to the stable of Willie Mullins.

Nichols Canyon made his debut under National Hunt rules in a Novice hurdle race at Cork Racecourse on 2 November 2014 in which he was ridden for the first time by Ruby Walsh. Starting at odds of 1/4 he took the lead approaching the final flight to win by a length from Baily Cloud with a gap of seventeen lengths to the rest of the eleven runners. Twenty-six days later the gelding was stepped up to Grade I level for the Royal Bond Hurdle at Fairyhouse and started 7/2 second favourite in a field of seven runners. With Walsh riding the Mullins trained favourite Allez Colombieres, Nichols Canyon was partnered by Paul Townend. Nichols Canyon took the lead at the second last hurdle and recovered from a mistake at the last to win by five lengths from All Hell Let Loose. The victory was marred for the Mullins team by the fatal injury sustained by Allez Colombieres. At Leopardstown Racecourse in December the gelding started odds-on favourite for the Grade I Future Champions Novice Hurdle but unseated Ruby Walsh at the third hurdle in a race won by Sizing John.

On 8 February, Nichols Canyon reappeared in the Deloitte Novice Hurdle over two and a quarter miles at Leopardstown and started second favourite behind his stable companion Alvisio Ville. Walsh sent the gelding to the front from the start and after being briefly headed by the favourite he regained the lead approaching the second last hurdle and drew away to win by three and a half lengths from Windsor Park with a gap of eight and a half lengths back to Alvisio Ville in third place. Mullins offered high praise after this performance "To put in a performance like that, against all those good horses in Leopardstown, that could be a Champion Hurdle performance. To me, did he look a little bit like Hurricane Fly? He’s the same type as a build of horse and has the same aggressiveness as him. He could be that horse".

On 11 March Nichols Canyon made his first appearance at the Cheltenham Festival and started the 7/2 favourite for the Grade I Baring Bingham Novices' Hurdle over two-mile and five furlongs contest. Despite horse racing analysts viewing the raise in distance a negative for Nichols Canyon chances on Cheltenham's stiff finish with the Supreme Novices' Hurdle offering a suitable alternative over two-mile, Mullins chose the extended trip as he already had the favourite for the shorter race with Ruby Walsh also in the saddle. Therefore, Walsh openly expressed the change of tactics in order to tackle the extra distance: "I wouldn’t want to make the running on him" which he applied during the race, restraining Nichols Canyon in the early stages and only beginning to make headway 3 furlongs from home, but after a mistake at the second last hurdle he was unable to make any further progress on the leaders and stayed on for third behind Windsor Park and the Challow Novices' Hurdle winner Parlour Games.

A month later, Nichols Canyon returned to England for the Grade I Mersey Novices' Hurdle over two and a half miles at Aintree Racecourse. He started the 3/1 favourite ahead of Parlour Games whilst the other ten runners included Three Musketeers (Leamington Novices' Hurdle), Days of Heaven (Dovecote Novices' Hurdle), As de Mee (EBF Novices' Handicap Hurdle), Sub Lieutenant (Michael Purcell Memorial Novice Hurdle), Ballybolley (Champion Standard Open NH Flat Race) and McKinley (Slaney Novice Hurdle). Nichols Canyon tracked the leader Ballybolley before moving up to take the lead just after the second last hurdle. He drew away on the run-in and won by four and a half lengths from Parlour Games with seven and a half lengths back to Three Musketeers in third place. Mullins admitted to being surprised by the performance saying "I didn't expect him to do that. I thought his coat had gone a bit and I said to Ruby he could run flat today... We came here on a wing and a prayer".

On his final appearance of the season, Nichols Canyon was made the 4/5 favourite for the Grade 1 Tattersalls Ireland Champion Novice Hurdle over two and a half miles at Punchestown on 1 May. Mckinley was again in opposition whilst the other four runners were Alpha des Obeaux, Sempre Medici (Dunboyne Castle Novice Hurdle), Outlander (Golden Cygnet Novice Hurdle) and Phil's Magic. Walsh sent the gelding in front from the start and Nichols Canyon maintained his advantage throughout, extending his lead approaching the last hurdle and winning in impressive style by seven lengths from Alpha des Obeaux, Racing Post describing him as "a proper Champion Hurdle horse in the making - he is a stayer with speed who relishes his racing". Walsh described the winner as "an iron little horse... he gallops and jumps and he's got some constitution".

=== 2015/2016 National Hunt season: Hurdles ===
On his first appearance of the 2015/2016 National Hunt season Nichols Canyon was one of five horses to contest the Grade I Morgiana Hurdle over two miles at Punchestown on 15 November. The 1/6 favourite was the undefeated Champion Hurdler Faugheen, who, as the Mullins' stable's star hurdler was ridden by Ruby Walsh. Nichols Canyon, the 7/1 second choice in the betting, was ridden by the trainer's nephew David Mullins and faced another three rivals with Wicklow Brave (County Hurdle)— also trained by Mullins, Plinth (Istabraq Hurdle) and Thomas Edison (Galway Hurdle). Nichols Canyon was left to set the pace upfront and with a round of jumping described as "brilliant" by Racing Post he managed to maintain the lead for the rest of the race. He only looked to be headed for a brief moment on the turn for home but he found plenty and again increased the lead before the last hurdle, managing to hold off the late charges on the run-in of his stablemate and short odds-on favourite Faugheen by half a length at the finish line, with Wicklow Brave a length and a quarter back in third. Immediately after the race Mullins was puzzled by the result declaring: "That worked out completely different from the way they worked on Tuesday. Faugheen left Nichols for dead... They went a good gallop and Nichols did it the hard way out in front, he jumped fantastic. Maybe he has improved more... He looks a Champion Hurdle horse now... I'm not making any excuses for Faugheen".

On 29 December Nichols Canyon started odds on favourite for the December Festival Hurdle over two miles on heavy ground at Leopardstown with only three opponents in Windsor Park, Plinth and the Fighting Fifth Hurdle winner Identity Thief. Nichols Canyon and Identity Thief disputed the lead multiple times during the race, initially with Ruby Walsh not pleased with the pace set by his rival and later on lost the advantage to Identity Thief after a mistake at the second last hurdle. However, Ruby Walsh regained his inside position near the rail and again went in front and from there on the lead was constantly disputed with both jockeys going all out, until the hundred yard marker from the finish at which Walsh mount battled hard and asserted to win by two lengths at the line, "making it one of the most enthralling races of the four-day festival" Commenting on the gelding's success Mullins compared him to Hurricane Fly saying "To look at, he’d remind you of him, and there’s the sheer toughness of him. He wouldn’t have the same speed as Hurricane Fly, but certainly he’s getting into that realm of ability. I thought that was him finished [at the second-last] but Ruby maintained his position on the inside, which meant he got a little breather coming around the last bend. But he’s tough, rock solid. He’s not the biggest horse but just hugely aggressive. When other horses might have backed off, he put down his head". The rematch with Faugheen came twenty-six days later in the Irish Champion Hurdle over the same course and distance in which he finished a distant third behind his stablemate.

At the 2016 Cheltenham Festival Nichols Canyon started the 15/2 third choice in the betting for the Champion Hurdle. He raced prominently throughout the race but made a bad mistake at the final obstacle and finished third behind Annie Power and My Tent Or Yours. In April he faced Annie Power again and finished third behind the mare in the Aintree Hurdle. In the following month he was sent to the United States and moved up in distance for the Iroquois Steeplechase over three miles at Percy Warner Park in Nashville. He disputed the lead for most of the way before finishing third behind Rawnaq and Shaneshill.

=== 2016/2017 National Hunt season: Hurdles ===
Nichols Canyon began the 2016/2017 season by attempting to repeat his success in the Morgiana Hurdle and started odds-on favourite ahead of Jer's Girl (Mares Novice Hurdle Championship Final), Sempre Medici (Red Mills Trial Hurdle) and Ivanovich Gorbatov (Triumph Hurdle). The race had not been his target, but he was drafted in when both Faugheen and Annie Power were injured. In a race run in thick fog Nichols Canyon emerged from the gloom to win by twelve lengths from Jer's Girl. Mullins commented "He’s just got lots of stamina and once it became a test of stamina the conditions suited him more than any other horse in the race. He jumps fantastically and he goes a very, very good gallop over two miles, so he’s competitive at it. I’d imagine we will be stepping up [in distance]." In December he started odds on favourite to win a second Ryanair Hurdle but was beaten seven lengths into second place by Petit Mouchoir. In the Irish Champion Hurdle in January he started second favourite behind Petit Mouchoir in a four-runner field which also included Ivanovich Gorbatov and the French import Footpad. He tracked the favourite from the start but looked well beaten when he fell at the last.

On 16 March Nichols Canyon was stepped up in distance to contest the Stayers' Hurdle over three miles at the Cheltenham Festival in which he was partnered by Walsh and started at odds of 10/1 in a twelve-runner field. Unowhatimeanharry started odd-on favourite after winning eight consecutive races including the Spa Novices' Hurdle and the Long Walk Hurdle. The other runners included Cole Harden. Jezki, Zarkandar and Shaneshill. Nichols Canyon was held up by Walsh as Cole Harden set a strong pace before giving way to the outsider Lil Rockerfeller on the final turn. Nichols Canyon moved into contention approaching the final flight, produced a strong late run on the rail, took the lead in the final strides and won by three quarters of a length from Lil Rockerfeller with Unowhatimeanharry three and a half lengths away in third. After the race Graham Wylie said "When I told Willie to buy a horse for me, he rang me up and said 'I think I've found you the next Inglis Drever'. He looks like Inglis Drever as he's only a pony, but he flew up the hill. Ruby told me he'd ride him like that to make sure he got the trip. It wasn't until approaching the last I thought he might get placed, never mind win... we thought he'd be a Champion Hurdle horse, but it hasn't gone right... but this is great. Willie is a genius". Walsh commented "He's a little warrior. He switched off, he jumped and we just crept away. Lil Rockerfeller was battling back at me but he kept going all the way to the line". On his final start of the season Nichols Canyon started 7/4 favourite for the Champion Stayers Hurdle at Punchestown on 27 April. The race developed into a sustained struggle between Nichols Canyon and Unowhatimeanharry with the British-trained gelding prevailing by a head.

=== 2017/2018 National Hunt season: Hurdles ===
On his first appearance of the 2017/2018 National Hunt season Nichols Canyon contested the Hatton's Grace Hurdle at Fairyhouse on 3 December and finished second to the five-year-old mare Apple's Jade. On 28 December Nichols Canyon faced Apple's Jade again in the Christmas Hurdle over three miles at Leopardstown. He was racing in third place when he fell heavily at the fifth flight, sustaining serious injuries. Although he was immediately attended by veterinary staff he could not be saved and was euthanised on the track. Ruby Walsh commented "He is a big loss... He was as tough as nails", while Patrick Mulling said "He was a small horse with a big heart and would run through a brick wall for you. He was a character as well, he was always a very happy horse."

== Pedigree ==
Pedigree of Nichols Canyon (GB), bay gelding, 2010
| Sire Authorized (IRE) 2004 | Montjeu (IRE); 1996 | Sadler's Wells | Northern Dancer |
| Sire Authorized (IRE) 2004 | Montjeu (IRE); 1996 | Sadler's Wells | Fairy Bridge |
| Sire Authorized (IRE) 2004 | Montjeu (IRE); 1996 | Floripedes | Top Ville |
| Sire Authorized (IRE) 2004 | Montjeu (IRE); 1996 | Floripedes | Toute Cy |
| Sire Authorized (IRE) 2004 | Funsie (FR); 1999 | Saumarez | Rainbow Quest |
| Sire Authorized (IRE) 2004 | Funsie (FR); 1999 | Saumarez | Fiesta Fun |
| Sire Authorized (IRE) 2004 | Funsie (FR); 1999 | Vallee Dansante | Lyphard |
| Sire Authorized (IRE) 2004 | Funsie (FR); 1999 | Vallee Dansante | Green Valley |
| Dam Zam Zoom (IRE) 2005 | Dalakhani (IRE); 2000 | Darshaan | Shirley Heights |
| Dam Zam Zoom (IRE) 2005 | Dalakhani (IRE); 2000 | Darshaan | Delsy |
| Dam Zam Zoom (IRE) 2005 | Dalakhani (IRE); 2000 | Daltawa | Miswaki |
| Dam Zam Zoom (IRE) 2005 | Dalakhani (IRE); 2000 | Daltawa | Damana |
| Dam Zam Zoom (IRE) 2005 | Mantesera (IRE); 2000 | In the Wings | Sadler's Wells |
| Dam Zam Zoom (IRE) 2005 | Mantesera (IRE); 2000 | In the Wings | High Hawk |
| Dam Zam Zoom (IRE) 2005 | Mantesera (IRE); 2000 | Lucayan Princess | High Line |
| Dam Zam Zoom (IRE) 2005 | Mantesera (IRE); 2000 | Lucayan Princess | Gay France (Family:7-a) |

- Nichols Canyon was inbred 3 × 4 to Sadler's Wells, meaning that this stallion appears in both the third and fourth generations of his pedigree.
