= Naas Oaks Trial =

Flat horse race in Ireland

Naas Oaks Trial
2026
Caught U Sleeping	La Fogata	Eretria

Previous years
2025
Garden Of Eden	Jaliyah	Island Hopping
2024
Hanalia	Bellezza	Greenfinch
2023
Library	Empress Of Beauty	Snowcapped
2022
Galleria Borghese	Alizarine	Seisai
2021
Willow	La Petite Coco	April Showers

2020-2012
2020
Even So	Laburnum	Silence Please
2019
Trethias	Search For A Song	Chablis
2018
Easter Lily	Mary Tudor	Sizzling
2017
Key To My Heart	Bloomfield	Elizabeth Browning
2016
Discipline	Earring	How High The Moon
2015
Outstanding	Stellar Glow	Easter
2014
Carla Bianca	Palace	Circling
2013
Venus de Milo	Opera Gloves	Bunairgead
2012
Caponata	Shebella	Aaraas

The Naas Oaks Trial is a Listed flat horse race in Ireland open to three-year-old thoroughbred fillies. It is run at Naas over a distance of 1 mile and 2 furlongs (2,012 metres), and it is scheduled to take place each year in June.

The race was first run in 2012. It serves as a trial for the Irish Oaks and the most recent horse to win both races was Even So in 2020.

== Records ==
Leading jockey (3 wins):

- Pat Smullen – Caponata (2012), Carla Bianca (2014), Discipline (2016)
- Wayne Lordan - Easter Lily (2018), Galleria Borghese (2022), Library (2023)

Leading trainer (8 wins):

- Aidan O'Brien – Venus de Milo (2013), Outstanding (2015), Key To My Heart (2017), Easter Lily (2018), Willow (2021), Galleria Borghese (2022), Library (2023), Garden of Eden (2025)

== Winners ==
Year	Winner	Jockey	Trainer	Time
2012	Caponata	Pat Smullen	Dermot Weld	2:15.50
2013	Venus de Milo	Seamie Heffernan	Aidan O'Brien	2:08.42
2014	Carla Bianca	Pat Smullen	Dermot Weld	2:11.44
2015	Outstanding	Colm O'Donoghue	Aidan O'Brien	2:10.73
2016	Discipline	Pat Smullen	Dermot Weld	2:14.30
2017	Key To My Heart	Donnacha O'Brien	Aidan O'Brien	2:13.09
2018	Easter Lily	Wayne Lordan	Aidan O'Brien	2:09.38
2019	Trethias	Shane Foley	Jessica Harrington	2:11.97
2020	Even So (Note: The 2020 race was run in July due to the COVID-19 pandemic in the Republic of Ireland)	Colin Keane	Ger Lyons	2:14.84
2021	Willow	Seamie Heffernan	Aidan O'Brien	2:08.43
2022	Galleria Borghese	Wayne Lordan	Aidan O'Brien	2:08.56
2023	Library	Wayne Lordan	Aidan O'Brien	2:07.00
2024	Hanalia	Ben Coen	Johnny Murtagh	2:12.84
2025	Garden of Eden	Ben Coen	Aidan O'Brien	2:15.05
2026	Caught U Sleeping	Colin Keane	Noel Meade	2:14:43

== See also ==
- Horse racing in Ireland
- List of Irish flat horse races
