= Madame Chiang (horse) =

British-bred Thoroughbred racehorse

- Sire: Archipenko
- Grandsire: Kingmambo
- Dam: Robe Chinoise
- Damsire: Robellino
- Sex: Mare
- Foaled: 20 April 2011
- Country: United Kingdom
- Colour: Bay
- Breeder: Kirsten Rausing
- Owner: Kirsten Rausing
- Trainer: David Simcock
- Record: 9: 3-0-0
- Earnings: £460,875

Major wins
- Musidora Stakes (2014); British Champions Fillies & Mares S. (2014)

Madame Chiang (foaled 20 April 2011) was a British Thoroughbred racehorse. She was a strong stayer who was especially well-suited by soft or heavy ground. After winning her only race as a juvenile in 2013 she won the Musidora Stakes on her three-year-old debut but ran poorly in the Epsom Oaks. He returned in autumn and recorded her biggest success in the British Champions Fillies & Mares Stakes. She failed to win or place in four races in 2015.

== Background ==
Madame Chiang was a bay mare with no white markings bred by Kirsten Rausing at the Lanwades Stud at Newmarket, Suffolk. She was trained throughout her racing career by David Simcock in Newmarket.

She was one of the best horses sired Archipenko, a successful international campaigner who recorded his biggest win in Hong Kong's Queen Elizabeth II Cup. Madame Chiang's dam Robe Chinoise showed modest racing ability, winning two minor races from seventeen starts. She was a great-granddaughter of Special, the dam of Nureyev and grand-dam of Sadler's Wells.

== Racing career ==
=== 2013: two-year-old season ===
Madame Chiang made her racecourse debut in a maiden race over one mile on soft ground at Yarmouth Racecourse in which she was ridden by Chris Catlin and started a 33/1 outsider in a ten-runner field. She started slowly and had to be "pushed along" but began to make rapid progress approaching the final furlong. She took the lead in the closing stages and drew clear of her rivals to win by four lengths.

=== 2014: three-year-old season ===
On 14 May 2014 Madame Chiang made her first appearance of her second season in the Musidora Stakes (a major trial for the Oaks Stakes) over ten and a half furlongs on oft ground at York Racecourse in which she was ridden by Kieren Fallon. Starting at odds of 8/1 she started poorly but produced a strong finish, taking the lead in the last 50 yards and winning by one and a quarter length from Lily Rules. After the race Fallon said "She's a lovely, big filly and this is a great trial. When she hit the front, she idled which is why she didn't go away, but this was only her second start and she'll improve. She pricked her ears when she hit the front. When they do that you know they've got more left. She's a beautiful mover and she could go on any ground so long as it's not too firm. She's honest and she tries, and she's laid back which is a big help as well". The ground was somewhat firmer when Madam Chiang was stepped up in distance to contest the 236th running of the Oaks at Epsom Racecourse on 6 June. She never looked likely to win at any stage and came home tenth of the seventeen runners, fifteen lengths behind the winner Taghrooda.

After a break of three months Madame Chiang returned to the track in France when she contested the Group 1 Prix Vermeille over 2400 metres at Longchamp Racecourse and finished sixth of the nine runner behind the upset winner Baltic Baroness. On 18 October on heavy ground at Ascot Racecourse the filly was ridden by Jim Crowley and started at odds of 12/1 for the British Champions Fillies & Mares Stakes. The 2013 winner Seal of Approval started favourite while the other fancied runners included Chicquita, Silk Sari (Park Hill Stakes), Albaharah (Pride Stakes) and Cubanita (John Porter Stakes). She was restrained by Crowley towards the rear and last of the ten runners approaching the final turn, but began to weave her way through the field in the straight. She took the lead 100 yards from the finish and stayed on strongly to win by two lengths from Silk Sari with Chicquita (who had looked the likely winner before hanging badly to the left) three quarters of a length back in third. David Simcock said "Madam Chiang is all about patience. This was the fifth run of her career and we have tried to look after her. We took our chance in the Oaks, which wasn't the best move, but there is only one Oaks" while Crowley commented "I got a lovely run through and she was very game".

=== 2015: four-year-old season ===
Madame Chiang remained in training as a four-year-old and was partnered by Crowley in all four of her races. She began her campaign by finishing fifth in the Middleton Stakes at York in May and then produced her best effort of the year when coming home fourth to Postponed in the King George VI and Queen Elizabeth Stakes. The filly failed to reproduce her best form when dropped back in distance and running unplaced in the Prix Jean Romanet over 2000 metres at Deauville Racecourse in August. On her final racecourse appearance she attempted to repeat her 2014 success in the British Champions Fillies & Mares Stakes on 17 October but came home tenth of the twelve runners behind Simple Verse.

== Breeding record ==
Madame Chiang was retired from racing and returned to her birth place to become a broodmare at Lanwades. He first foal, a filly sired by Kingman was foaled in 2017.

== Pedigree ==
Pedigree of Madame Chiang (GB), bay mare, 2011
Sire Archipenko (USA) 2004	Kingmambo (USA); 1990	Mr Prospector	Raise A Native
Sire Archipenko (USA) 2004	Kingmambo (USA); 1990	Mr Prospector	Gold Digger
Sire Archipenko (USA) 2004	Kingmambo (USA); 1990	Miesque	Nureyev
Sire Archipenko (USA) 2004	Kingmambo (USA); 1990	Miesque	Pasadoble
Sire Archipenko (USA) 2004	Bound (USA); 1984	Nijinsky (CAN)	Northern Dancer
Sire Archipenko (USA) 2004	Bound (USA); 1984	Nijinsky (CAN)	Flaming Page
Sire Archipenko (USA) 2004	Bound (USA); 1984	Special	Forli (ARG)
Sire Archipenko (USA) 2004	Bound (USA); 1984	Special	Thong
Dam Robe Chinoise (GB) 1999	Robellino (USA); 1978	Roberto	Hail to Reason
Dam Robe Chinoise (GB) 1999	Robellino (USA); 1978	Roberto	Bramalea
Dam Robe Chinoise (GB) 1999	Robellino (USA); 1978	Isobelline	Pronto (ARG)
Dam Robe Chinoise (GB) 1999	Robellino (USA); 1978	Isobelline	Isobella
Dam Robe Chinoise (GB) 1999	Kiliniski (GB); 1982	Niniski (USA)	Nijinsky (CAN)
Dam Robe Chinoise (GB) 1999	Kiliniski (GB); 1982	Niniski (USA)	Virginia Hills
Dam Robe Chinoise (GB) 1999	Kiliniski (GB); 1982	Kilavea (USA)	Hawaii (SAF)
Dam Robe Chinoise (GB) 1999	Kiliniski (GB); 1982	Kilavea (USA)	Special (family: 5-h)

- Madame Chiang was inbred 3 × 4 to both Nijinsky and Special, meaning that these horses appear in both the third and fourth generations of her pedigree.
