= Haynes, Hanson and Clark Conditions Stakes =

Flat horse race in Britain

- Class: Conditions
- Location: Newbury Racecourse; Newbury, England
- Race type: Flat / Thoroughbred
- Sponsor: Haynes, Hanson and Clark
- Website: Newbury

Race information
- Distance: 1 mile (1,609 metres)
- Surface: Turf
- Track: Straight
- Qualification: Two-year-old colts and geldings
- Weight: 9 st 0lb Penalties; 8 lb for Class 1 / 2 winners 6 lb for Class 3 winners 3 lb for Class 4 winners
- Purse: £30,000 (2025); 1st: £15,702

Haynes, Hanson & Clark Stakes
2026
| Bin Jahwar | King High | Apulia Bay |

Previous years
2025
Look To The Stars | Tierra Del Toro | Bourbon Blues
2024
Regal Ulixes | King Of Cities | Echalar
2023
Bracken's Laugh | King's Gambit | Blue Lemons
2022
Stormbuster | Highbank | Classic
2021
Zechariah | Westover | King Of Conquest

2020-2011
2020
Yibir | Megallan | Jumby
2019
Tritonic | Man Of The Night | Cape Palace
2018
Raakib Alhawa | Dashing Willoughby | Beat Le Bon
2017
White Mocha | Knight To Behold | Sallab
2016
Temple Church | Raheen House | Galactic Prince
2015
Stormy Antarctic | Special Season | Navajo War Dance
2014
Snoano | Acaster Malbis | Perceus
2013
Pinzolo | Red Galileo | Pupil
2012
Wentworth | Chief Havoc | Another Cocktail
2011
Cavaleiro | Harvard N Yale | Spoke To Carlo

2010-2001
2010
Moriarty | Seattle Drive | Enabling
2009
Ameer | Private Story | Lunar Victory
2008
Taameer | Full Toss | Palavicini
2007
Centennial | North Parade | Judgethemoment
2006
Teslin | Aqaleem | Authorized
2005
Winged Cupid | Shahin | Priors Hill
2004
Merchant | Noble Duty | Mastman
2003
Elshadi | Let The Lion Roar | Zouave
2002
Saturn | Kingfield | Dhabyan
2001
Fight Your Corner | Wing Commander | Don Fernando

2000-1991
2000
Nayef | Tamburlaine | Mersey Sound
1999
Ethmaar | Paradise Garden | Kookaburra
1998
Boatman | Entertainer | Daliapour
1997
Duck Row | Quiet Assurance | Evening World
1996
King Sound | Solo Mio | Haltarra
1995
Mick's Love | Busy Flight | Sasuru
1994
Munwar | Stiffelio | Danjing
1993
King's Theatre | Star Selection | Khamaseen
1992
Pembroke | The Informer | White Muzzle
1991
Zinaad | Grand Master | Alsaarm

1990-1988
1990
Prince Russanor | Democratic | Red Rainbow
1989
Tanfith | Waki Gold | Snurge
1988
Star Shareef | Moonfish | Demawend

The Haynes, Hanson and Clark Conditions Stakes is a flat horse race in Great Britain open to two-year-old colts and geldings. It is run at Newbury over a distance of 1 mile (1,609 metres), and it is scheduled to take place each year in September.

The event was known as the Kris Plate in 1979 and 1980, and on these two occasions it was won by the subsequent Derby winners Henbit and Shergar.

The race was given its present title in 1981, when the wine merchants Haynes, Hanson and Clark became its sponsor. Since then it has been contested by two future Derby winners, Shahrastani, the runner-up in 1985, and Authorized, third in 2006.

== Records ==
Leading jockey (3 wins):

- Pat Eddery – Rainbow Quest (1983), Zinaad (1991), Boatman (1998)
- Kevin Darley – Fight Your Corner (2001), Winged Cupid (2005), Teslin (2006)
- William Buick – Yibir (2020), Look To The Stars (2025), Bin Jahwar (2026)

Leading trainer (5 wins):

- Marcus Tregoning – Ethmaar (1999), Nayef (2000), Elshadi (2003), Taameer (2008), Cavaleiro (2011)

== Winners ==
| Year | Winner | Jockey | Trainer | Time |
|---|---|---|---|---|
| 1979 | Henbit | Willie Carson | Dick Hern | 1:42.30 |
| 1980 | Shergar | Lester Piggott | Michael Stoute | 1:39.71 |
| 1981 | Super Sunrise | Steve Cauthen | Gavin Hunter | 1:46.90 |
| 1982 | Polished Silver | Lester Piggott | Henry Cecil | 1:42.29 |
| 1983 | Rainbow Quest | Pat Eddery | Jeremy Tree | 1:44.80 |
| 1984 | Northern River | Joe Mercer | John Dunlop | 1:49.01 |
| 1985 | My Ton Ton | Philip Robinson | Clive Brittain | 1:41.67 |
| 1986 | Thameen | Tony Murray | Harry Thomson Jones | 1:41.15 |
| 1987 | Unfuwain | Willie Carson | Dick Hern | 1:39.88 |
| 1988 | Star Shareef (Note: Moonfish finished first in 1988, but he was relegated to second place following a stewards' inquiry) | Bruce Raymond | John Dunlop | 1:39.90 |
| 1989 | Tanfith | Geoff Baxter | Robert Armstrong | 1:40.60 |
| 1990 | Prince Russanor | Simon Whitworth | John Dunlop | 1:44.17 |
| 1991 | Zinaad | Pat Eddery | Michael Stoute | 1:39.65 |
| 1992 | Pembroke | Steve Cauthen | John Gosden | 1:44.47 |
| 1993 | King's Theatre | Willie Ryan | Henry Cecil | 1:43.94 |
| 1994 | Munwar | Richard Hills | Peter Walwyn | 1:44.78 |
| 1995 | Mick's Love | Michael Roberts | Mark Johnston | 1:42.47 |
| 1996 | King Sound | Willie Ryan | John Gosden | 1:38.96 |
| 1997 | Duck Row | Seb Sanders | James Toller | 1:43.81 |
| 1998 | Boatman | Pat Eddery | Roger Charlton | 1:40.80 |
| 1999 | Ethmaar | Tim Sprake | Marcus Tregoning | 1:37.74 |
| 2000 | Nayef | Richard Hills | Marcus Tregoning | 1:40.53 |
| 2001 | Fight Your Corner | Kevin Darley | Mark Johnston | 1:38.47 |
| 2002 | Saturn | Jamie Spencer | Michael Bell | 1:39.19 |
| 2003 | Elshadi | Martin Dwyer | Marcus Tregoning | 1:39.29 |
| 2004 | Merchant | Richard Mullen | Michael Bell | 1:40.25 |
| 2005 | Winged Cupid | Kevin Darley | Mark Johnston | 1:37.50 |
| 2006 | Teslin | Kevin Darley | Mark Johnston | 1:40.44 |
| 2007 | Centennial | Jimmy Fortune | John Gosden | 1:40.08 |
| 2008 | Taameer | Hayley Turner | Marcus Tregoning | 1:41.19 |
| 2009 | Ameer | Frankie Dettori | Saeed bin Suroor | 1:38.68 |
| 2010 | Moriarty | Pat Dobbs | Richard Hannon Sr. | 1:40.02 |
| 2011 | Cavaleiro | Richard Mullen | Marcus Tregoning | 1:41.85 |
| 2012 | Wentworth | Richard Hughes | Richard Hannon Sr. | 1:39.84 |
| 2013 | Pinzolo | Mickael Barzalona | Charlie Appleby | 1:40.89 |
| 2014 | Snoano | Paul Hanagan | John Gosden | 1:42.80 |
| 2015 | Stormy Antarctic | George Baker | Ed Walker | 1:43.14 |
| 2016 | Temple Church | Jimmy Fortune | Hughie Morrison | 1:43.50 |
| 2017 | White Mocha | James Doyle | Hugo Palmer | 1:40.70 |
| 2018 | Raakib Alhawa | Andrea Atzeni | David Simcock | 1:45.21 |
| 2019 | Tritonic | Oisin Murphy | Alan King | 1:38.45 |
| 2020 | Yibir | William Buick | Charlie Appleby | 1:37.66 |
| 2021 | Zechariah | Tom Marquand | Martyn Meade | 1:39.80 |
| 2022 | Stormbuster | David Probert | Andrew Balding | 1:40.67 |
| 2023 | Bracken's Laugh | Finley Marsh | Richard Hughes | 1:46.73 |
| 2024 | Regal Ulixes | Oisin Murphy | Andrew Balding | 1:40.91 |
| 2025 | Look To The Stars | William Buick | Charlie Appleby | 1:43.76 |
| 2026 | Bin Jahwar | William Buick | Charlie Appleby | 1:37.61 |

== See also ==
- Horse racing in Great Britain
- List of British flat horse races
