= British Champions Fillies and Mares Stakes =

Flat horse race in Britain

British Champions Fillies & Mares Stakes (ex Pride Stakes / Princess Royal Stakes)
- Class: Group 1
- Location: Ascot Racecourse; Ascot, England
- Inaugurated: 1946
- Race type: Flat / Thoroughbred
- Sponsor: QIPCO
- Website: Ascot

Race information
- Distance: 1m 3f 211y (2,406 metres)
- Surface: Turf
- Track: Right-handed
- Qualification: Three-years-old and up fillies and mares
- Weight: 9 st 1 lb (3yo); 9 st 7 lb (4yo+)
- Purse: £531,250 (2025); 1st £301,272

British Champions Fillies & Mares Stakes
2026
Minnie Hauk	Believed	Lilt

Previous years
2025
Kalpana	Estrange	Quisisana
2024
Kalpana	Wingspan	Tiffany
2023
Poptronic	Bluestocking	Jackie Oh
2022
Emily Upjohn	Thunder Kiss	Insinuendo
2021
Eshaada	Albaflora	Snowfall

2020-2011
2020
Wonderful Tonight	Dame Malliot	Passion
2019
Star Catcher	Delphinia	Sun Maiden
2018
Magical	Coronet	Lah Ti Dar
2017
Hydrangea	Bateel	Coronet
2016
Journey	Speedy Boarding	Queen's Trust
2015
Simple Verse	Journey	Beautiful Romance
2014
Madame Chiang	Silk Sari	Chicquita
2013
Seal Of Approval	Belle de Crecy	Talent
2012
Sapphire	Shirocco Star	Dancing Rain
2011
Dancing Rain	Bible Belt	Gertrude Bell

2010-2001
2010
Crystal Capella	Myplacelater	She's Our Mark
2009
Ashalanda	Crystal Capella	Saphira's Fire
2008
Crystal Capella	Unsung Heroine	Saphira's Fire
2007
Trick Or Treat	Queen's Best	Samira Gold
2006
Acts of Grace	Gower Song	Bunood
2005
Ouija Board	Briolette	Asawer
2004
Mazuna	My Renee	Hidden Hope
2003
Itnab	Summitville	Chorist
2002
Love Everlasting	Bright And Clear	Glam Rock
2001
Head In The Clouds	Love Everlasting	Lilium

2000-1991
2000
Sacred Song	Littlepacepaddocks	Inaaq
1999
Signorina Cattiva	New Abbey	Tipsy
1998
Silver Rhapsody	Delilah	Bristol Channel
1997
Delilah	Snow Princess	Saafeya
1996
Time Allowed	Spout	Ninotchka
1995
Labibeh	Saxon Maid	Spout
1994
Dancing Bloom	Lille Hammer	Milly Ha Ha
1992
Cunning	Anna Of Saxony	Anne Bonny
1991
Always Friendly	Finance Dancer	Peplum

1990-1988
1990
Narwala	Applecross	Ahead
1989
Snow Bride	Princess Sobieska	Lady Shipley
1988
Banket	Upend	Casey

The British Champions Fillies & Mares Stakes is a Group 1 flat horse race in Great Britain open to fillies and mares aged three years or older. It is run over a distance of 1 mile 3 furlongs and 211 yards (2,406 metres) as part of British Champions Day at Ascot in October.

== History ==
The event was established in 1946 and was originally called the Princess Royal Stakes. It was named after the Princess Royal at that time, Princess Mary. For a period it took place in September, and it later moved to October.

The current system of race grading was introduced in 1971, and the Princess Royal Stakes subsequently held Group 3 status.

The race was run at Newmarket in 2000, after being called off at Ascot due to a security alert. It was switched to Ascot's late September fixture in 2004. It took place at Newmarket again in 2005, as its usual home was closed for redevelopment. It reverted to October in 2007.

The event was promoted to Group 2 level, transferred to Newmarket and renamed the Pride Stakes in 2008. It was named after Pride, a recent winner of the Champion Stakes. From this point it was staged during the venue's Champions' Meeting in mid-October. The title "Princess Royal Stakes" was assigned to a different race at Ascot, an event previously called the Harvest Stakes. The Pride Stakes had a purse of £100,000 in 2010.

The race returned to Ascot and was given its present name in 2011. Its prize fund was now £250,000. Part of the newly created British Champions Day, it became the final race in the fillies & mares division of the British Champions Series.

The British Champions Fillies & Mares Stakes was upgraded to Group 1 in 2013. Its total prize money was doubled to £500,000. The title Pride Stakes was given to a Listed race at Newmarket formerly known as the Severals Stakes.

== Records ==
Most successful horse (2 wins):

- Shebeen – 1974, 1975
- Crystal Capella – 2008, 2010
- Kalpana - 2024, 2025

Leading jockey (8 wins):

- Lester Piggott – Rose of Medina (1959), Green Opal (1960), Vhairi (1963), Bracey Bridge (1965), Bamboozle (1967), Mandera (1973), Karamita (1980), One Way Street (1984)

Leading trainer (9 wins):

- John Dunlop – Predicament (1966), Trillionaire (1978), Flighting (1981), Believer (1982), Banket (1988), Labibeh (1995), Signorina Cattiva (1999), Head in the Clouds (2001), Acts of Grace (2006)

Leading owner (4 wins):

- HH Aga Khan IV – Karamita (1980), Tashtiya (1986), Narwala (1990), Ashalanda (2009)

== Winners ==
Year	Winner	Age	Jockey	Trainer	Owner	Time
1946	Mehmany	3	Gordon Richards	Frank Butters	Aga Khan III	2:43.00
1947	Mombasa	3	Ken Gethin	Victor Smyth	D Miln	2:40.60
1948	Angelola	3	Edgar Britt	Cecil Boyd-Rochfort	King George VI	2:36.40
1949	Jet Plane	3	Gordon Richards	Joseph Lawson	Lord Astor	2:44.60
1950	Divinalh	3	Rae Johnstone	Charles Semblat	Marcel Boussac	2:44.80
1951	Verse	3	Charlie Smirke	Noel Cannon	J V Rank	2:46.20
1952	Nicky Nook	3	Gordon Richards	Rufus Beasley	J B Townley	2:40.20
1953	Skye	3	Bill Rickaby	Jack Jarvis	Lord Rosebery	2:44.40
1954	Dust Storm	3	Manny Mercer	George Colling	Colonel W A G Burns	2:52.60
1955	Nemora	3	Manny Mercer	Harry Wragg	M G Egalis	2:47.60
1956	Carezza	3	Rae Johnstone	Paddy Prendergast	Lady Honor Svejdar	2:52.78
1957	Nagaika	3	Harry Carr	William Smyth	H J Joel	2:41.78
1958	Mother Goose	3	Harry Carr	Walter Nightingall	Emile Littler	2:42.17
1959	Rose Of Medina	3	Lester Piggott	Noel Murless	J R Hindley	2:37.30
1960 (Note: The 1960 running was held at Newbury Racecourse)	Green Opal	3	Lester Piggott	Noel Murless	Lieutenant-Colonel Giles Loder	3:23.00
1961	Tenacity	3	Scobie Breasley	Sir Gordon Richards	Mrs W H D Riley-Smith	2:44.19
1962	Romantica	3	Bill Williamson	Harry Wragg	G A Oldham	2:45.11
1963 (Note: The 1963 running was held at Newbury Racecourse)	Vhairi	3	Lester Piggott	Rufus Beasley	Hugh Leggat	2:43.60
1964	French Possession	3	Doug Smith	Geoffrey Brooke	R F Dennis	2:34.36
1965	Bracey Bridge	3	Lester Piggott	Noel Murless	M W Wickham-Boynton	2:38.73
1966	Predicament	3	Ron Hutchinson	John Dunlop	Duke of Norfolk	2:38.50
1967	Bamboozle	3	Lester Piggott	Sam Armstrong	E Cooper Bland	2:40.32
1968	Abandoned due to waterlogging					
1969	Seventh Bride	3	Duncan Keith	Peter Walwyn	Louis Freedman	2:40.19
1970	Heavenly Thought	3	Joe Mercer	Dick Hern	Lord Rotherwick	2:34.57
1971	Hill Circus	3	Geoff Lewis	Noel Murless	G Pope, jnr	2:36.21
1972	Attica Meli	3	Geoff Lewis	Noel Murless	Louis Freedman	2:36.11
1973	Mandera	3	Lester Piggott	Jeremy Tree	Mrs C Engelhard	2:42.46
1974	Shebeen	3	Geoff Baxter	Bruce Hobbs	Sir Kenneth Butt	2:50.98
1975	Shebeen	4	Geoff Baxter	Bruce Hobbs	Sir Kenneth Butt	2:34.84
1976	Abandoned due to waterlogging					
1977	Aloft	3	Greville Starkey	Barry Hills	Mrs J Buckhardt	2:43.76
1978	Trillionaire	3	Pat Eddery	John Dunlop	Nelson Bunker Hunt	2:35.61
1979	Alia	3	Steve Raymont	Jeremy Tree	Khalid Abdullah	2:40.28
1980	Karamita	3	Lester Piggott	Michael Stoute	HH Aga Khan IV	2:41.85
1981	Flighting	3	Brian Rouse	John Dunlop	Sandy Struthers	2:44.79
1982	Believer	3	Brian Rouse	John Dunlop	Arthur Budgett	2:44.22
1983	Sylph	3	Tony Ives	Jeremy Tree	Khalid Abdullah	2:33.25
1984	One Way Street	3	Lester Piggott	Henry Cecil	Louis Freedman	2:38.59
1985	Free Guest	4	Rae Guest	Luca Cumani	Fittocks Stud	2:31.76
1986	Tashtiya	3	Walter Swinburn	Michael Stoute	HH Aga Khan IV	2:34.35
1987	Abandoned due to waterlogging					
1988	Banket	3	Brian Rouse	John Dunlop	3rd Earl of Halifax	2:40.66
1989	Snow Bride	3	Steve Cauthen	Henry Cecil	Saeed bin M. Al Maktoum	2:30.73
1990	Narwala	3	Pat Eddery	Luca Cumani	HH Aga Khan IV	2:30.36
1991	Always Friendly	3	Alan Munro	Henry Candy	Fahd Salman	2:38.78
1992	Cunning	3	Frankie Dettori	Luca Cumani	Fittocks Stud	2:36.19
1993	Abandoned due to waterlogging					
1994	Dancing Bloom	4	Walter Swinburn	Michael Stoute	Lord Weinstock	2:34.15
1995	Labibeh	3	Willie Carson	John Dunlop	Hamdan Al Maktoum	2:41.86
1996	Time Allowed	3	John Reid	Michael Stoute	Robert Barnett	2:33.44
1997	Delilah	3	Olivier Peslier	Michael Stoute	Highclere Racing Ltd	2:45.33
1998	Silver Rhapsody	3	Kieren Fallon	Henry Cecil	Lordship Stud	2:43.68
1999	Signorina Cattiva	3	Frankie Dettori	John Dunlop	Maria Mai Goransson	2:35.40
2000	Sacred Song	3	Richard Quinn	Henry Cecil	Niarchos Family	2:31.86
2001	Head in the Clouds	3	Pat Eddery	John Dunlop	Neil Jones	2:35.73
2002	Love Everlasting	4	Kevin Darley	Mark Johnston	G. & L. Middlebrook	2:33.55
2003	Itnab	3	Richard Hills	Ben Hanbury	Hamdan Al Maktoum	2:34.16
2004	Mazuna	3	Ryan Moore	Clive Brittain	Saeed Manana	2:30.24
2005	Ouija Board	4	Frankie Dettori	Ed Dunlop	19th Earl of Derby	2:32.45
2006	Acts of Grace	3	Kerrin McEvoy	John Dunlop	Prince A. A. Faisal	2:35.64
2007	Trick or Treat	4	Tom Queally	James Given	Onslow / Henderson	2:36.93
2008	Crystal Capella	3	Ryan Moore	Sir Michael Stoute	Sir Evelyn de Rothschild	2:31.48
2009	Ashalanda	3	Christophe Lemaire	Alain de Royer-Dupré	HH Aga Khan IV	2:31.55
2010	Crystal Capella	5	Ryan Moore	Sir Michael Stoute	Sir Evelyn de Rothschild	2:34.73
2011	Dancing Rain	3	Johnny Murtagh	William Haggas	Martin and Lee Taylor	2:27.29
2012	Sapphire	4	Pat Smullen	Dermot Weld	Moyglare Stud Farm	2:37.32
2013	Seal of Approval	4	George Baker	James Fanshawe	T R G Vestey	2:39.09
2014	Madame Chiang	3	Jim Crowley	David Simcock	Kirsten Rausing	2:38.76
2015	Simple Verse	3	Andrea Atzeni	Ralph Beckett	QRL / Al Thani / Al Kubaisi	2:32.01
2016	Journey	4	Frankie Dettori	John Gosden	George Strawbridge	2:28.41
2017	Hydrangea	3	Ryan Moore	Aidan O'Brien	Smith / Magnier / Tabor	2:40.82
2018	Magical	3	Ryan Moore	Aidan O'Brien	Smith / Magnier / Tabor	2:33.28
2019 (Note: The 2019, 2023 and 2024 editions were held on Ascot's inner course over 1 mile, 3 furlongs and 133 yards)	Star Catcher	3	Frankie Dettori	John Gosden	Anthony Oppenheimer	2:28.48
2020	Wonderful Tonight	3	William Buick	David Menuisier	Christopher Wright	2:37.84
2021	Eshaada	3	Jim Crowley	Roger Varian	Shadwell Estate	2:34.05
2022	Emily Upjohn	3	Frankie Dettori	John and Thady Gosden	Lloyd Webber, Tactful Finance & S Roden	2:33.76
2023	Poptronic	4	Sam James	Karl Burke	David & Yvonne Blunt	2:28.29
2024	Kalpana	3	William Buick	Andrew Balding	Juddmonte	2:29.57
2025	Kalpana	4	Colin Keane	Andrew Balding	Juddmonte	2:32.67
2026	Minnie Hauk	4	Ryan Moore	Aidan O'Brien	Smith / Magnier / Tabor	2:29.49

== See also ==
- Horseracing in Great Britain
- List of British flat horse races
- Recurring sporting events established in 1946 – this race is included under its original title, Princess Royal Stakes.
