= Saumarez (horse) =

British-bred Thoroughbred racehorse

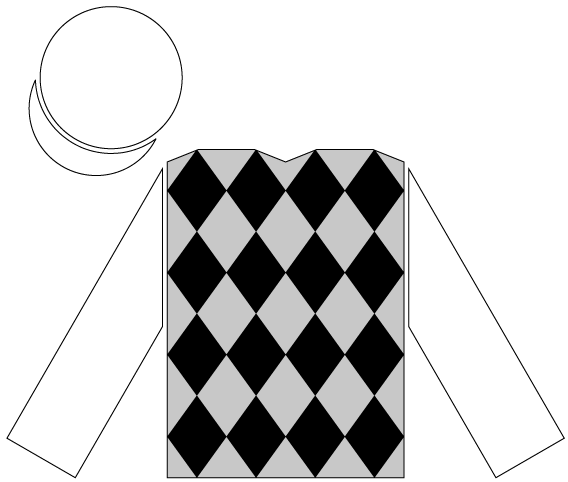
- Racing silks of Bruce McNall
- Sire: Rainbow Quest
- Grandsire: Blushing Groom
- Dam: Fiesta Fun
- Damsire: Welsh Pageant
- Sex: Stallion
- Foaled: 28 March 1987
- Country: Great Britain
- Colour: Dark Bay
- Breeder: Suc. E. Longton
- Owner: Bruce McNall (75%) & Wayne Gretzky (25%)
- Trainer: Henry Cecil (England); Nicolas Clément (France)
- Record: 11: 4-3-3
- Earnings: US$1,388,517 (equivalent)

Major wins
- Prix du Prince d'Orange (1990); Grand Prix de Paris (1990); Prix de l'Arc de Triomphe (1990)

Awards
- Timeform rating: 132

Saumarez (28 March 1987–2012) was a Thoroughbred racehorse who won France's most prestigious race, the Prix de l'Arc de Triomphe in 1990.

== Background ==
Saumarez was sired by the 1985 Prix de l'Arc de Triomphe winner Rainbow Quest in his first season at stud. He was owned by National Hockey League superstar Wayne Gretzky and owner of his Los Angeles Kings ice hockey team, Bruce McNall. He was trained at trained by Henry Cecil at his Warren Place stable at Newmarket, Suffolk.

== Racing career ==
Saumarez failed to win at age two in 1989 then got his first win in 1990 under Steve Cauthen in the Aldborough Maiden Stakes. Following a win in the Harvester Graduation Stakes, he finished second to winner Blue Stag in the Dee Stakes at Chester Racecourse.

In June he was sent to France where Nicolas Clément took over as trainer. Steve Cauthen rode Saumarez to victory in the Grand Prix de Paris and then under French jockey Gérald Mossé, he won the Prix du Prince d'Orange in September and October's prestigious, Prix de l'Arc de Triomphe. For majority owner Bruce McNall, it was his second Arc win, having won it in 1987 with Trempolino. Nicolas Clément became the youngest trainer to win this race. Saumarez was then sent to the United States for the Breeders' Cup Turf at Belmont Park in Elmont, New York where he finished fifth to In the Wings whom he had beaten in the Arc.

== Stud record ==
Sold for $8 million to a syndicate led by C A B St. George, Saumarez was retired to stud. He formerly stands at Odessa Stud in Ceres, Western Cape in South Africa and Died in 2012. He has sired twelve stakes winners and notably is the damsire of 2007 Epsom Derby winner, Authorized.

== Pedigree ==
Pedigree of Saumarez (GB), brown stallion, 1987
Sire Rainbow Quest (USA) 1981	Blushing Groom (FR); 1974	Red God	Nasrullah
Sire Rainbow Quest (USA) 1981	Blushing Groom (FR); 1974	Red God	Spring Run
Sire Rainbow Quest (USA) 1981	Blushing Groom (FR); 1974	Runaway Bride	Wild Risk
Sire Rainbow Quest (USA) 1981	Blushing Groom (FR); 1974	Runaway Bride	Aimee
Sire Rainbow Quest (USA) 1981	I Will Follow (USA); 1975	Herbager	Vandale
Sire Rainbow Quest (USA) 1981	I Will Follow (USA); 1975	Herbager	Flagette
Sire Rainbow Quest (USA) 1981	I Will Follow (USA); 1975	Where You Lead	Raise A Native
Sire Rainbow Quest (USA) 1981	I Will Follow (USA); 1975	Where You Lead	Noblesse
Dam Fiesta Fun (GB) 1978	Welsh Pageant (FR); 1966	Tudor Melody	Tudor Minstrel
Dam Fiesta Fun (GB) 1978	Welsh Pageant (FR); 1966	Tudor Melody	Matelda
Dam Fiesta Fun (GB) 1978	Welsh Pageant (FR); 1966	Picture Light	Court Martial
Dam Fiesta Fun (GB) 1978	Welsh Pageant (FR); 1966	Picture Light	Queen of Light
Dam Fiesta Fun (GB) 1978	Antigua (GB); 1958	Hyperion	Gainsborough
Dam Fiesta Fun (GB) 1978	Antigua (GB); 1958	Hyperion	Selene
Dam Fiesta Fun (GB) 1978	Antigua (GB); 1958	Nassau	Nasrullah
Dam Fiesta Fun (GB) 1978	Antigua (GB); 1958	Nassau	Meraline (Family: 16-a)

- Saumarez was inbred 4 × 4 to Nasrullah, meaning that this stallion appeared twice in the fourth generation of his pedigree.
