= Montjeu =

Irish-bred Thoroughbred racehorse and sire (1996–2012)

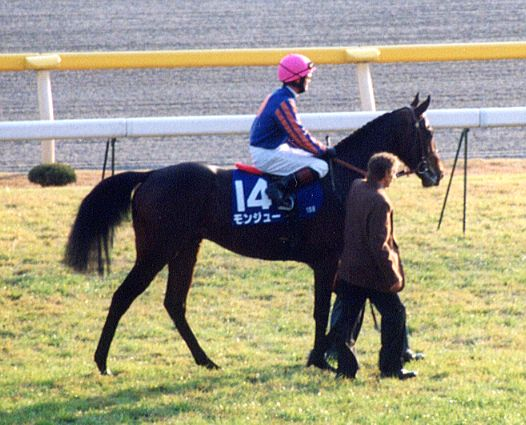
- Montjeu at the 1999 Japan Cup
- Sire: Sadler's Wells
- Grandsire: Northern Dancer
- Dam: Floripedes
- Damsire: Top Ville
- Sex: Stallion
- Foaled: 4 April 1996
- Died: 29 March 2012 (aged 15)
- Country: Ireland
- Colour: Bay
- Breeder: Sir James Goldsmith
- Owner: Laure Boulay de la Meurthe; Michael Tabor
- Trainer: John E. Hammond
- Record: 16: 11-2-0
- Earnings: $2,062,822

Major wins
- Prix du Jockey Club (1999); Irish Derby (1999); Prix de l'Arc de Triomphe (1999); Tattersalls Gold Cup (2000); Grand Prix de Saint-Cloud (2000); K. George VI & Q. Elizabeth Stakes (2000)

Awards
- European Champion 3-Yr-Old Colt (1999) #1 – International Classification for 3-Yr-Olds (1999); Timeform rating: 137; Leading sire in France (2005)
- Last updated on 12 September 2022

Montjeu (4 April 1996 – 29 March 2012) was an Irish-bred, French-trained thoroughbred horse racing racehorse and sire. In a racing career which lasted from September 1998 to November 2000, he ran sixteen times and won eleven races, including six at Group 1. After winning twice as a juvenile, he was the outstanding European racehorse of 1999, winning the Prix du Jockey Club, the Irish Derby and the Prix de l'Arc de Triomphe. Four more victories in 2000 included the King George VI and Queen Elizabeth Stakes. He was then retired to stud where he proved to be an outstanding sire of winners.

He died on 29 March 2012 at age 15 at Coolmore Stud from complications related to sepsis.

== Background ==
Montjeu, a bay horse standing 16.1 hands high, was bred in Ireland by Sir James Goldsmith, who named him after his chateau outside Autun in France. Goldsmith died in 1997, before the colt began racing, and his ownership went to a holding company (Tsega Ltd) owned by Laure Boulay de la Meurthe, mother of two of Goldsmith's children. Montjeu was sired by the thirteen times Irish Champion Sire Sadler's Wells out of the Prix de Lutèce winner Floripedes. The colt was sent into training with John E. Hammond at Chantilly.

== Racing career ==
=== 1998: two-year-old season ===
Montjeu ran twice as a two-year-old in the autumn of 1998. On his racecourse debut he appeared in the Prix de la Maniguette over 1600 m at Chantilly and won "easily" from nine opponents. A month later, he was moved up to Listed class and won the Prix Isonomy by three quarters of a length from Spadoun. Montjeu's form was boosted two weeks later when Spadoun won the Group One Critérium de Saint-Cloud. At the end of the year, a half-share in Montjeu was sold to the Coolmore organization, represented by Michael Tabor and Susan Magnier.

=== 1999: three-year-old season ===
Montjeu began his three-year-old season by starting joint-favourite with the Aga Khan's colt Sendawar in the Group Two Prix Greffulhe over 2100 m at Longchamp in April. Ridden by Cash Asmussen, he was restrained in the early stages before finishing strongly to overtake Sendawar 50 m from the finish and win by a length. Sendawar went on to win the Poule d'Essai des Poulains the St. James's Palace Stakes and the Prix du Moulin de Longchamp before the end of the season. On his next start Montjeu was made 1/10 favourite for the Prix Lupin, but was beaten a length by Gracioso after hanging to the right in the closing stages of a slowly run race.

Despite his defeat, Montjeu was made 7/5 favourite for the Prix du Jockey Club at Chantilly on 6 June. Asmussen held the colt up at the rear of the field before making his challenge in the straight. He took the lead 400 m from the finish and drew away from his opponents to win by four lengths from Nowhere To Exit, with Gracioso finishing nine lengths further back in sixth. Three weeks later, Montjeu was sent to the Curragh for the Irish Derby where his main rivals appeared to be the English-trained colts Daliapour and Beat All who had finished second and third respectively in The Derby. As at Chantilly, Montjeu was held up in the early running before moving smoothly through to dispute the lead in the straight. He took the lead a furlong from the finish and pulled clear to win by five lengths from Daliapour in "impressive" style. After the race, Asmussen claimed that he had "five kilos in hand".

Montjeu was then given a planned break of more than two months before returning in the Prix Niel at Longchamp. Ridden for the first time by Mick Kinane, he was last of the four runners entering the straight but moved forward to take the lead in the closing stages and won "cleverly" by a head from Bienamado. In the Prix de l'Arc de Triomphe three weeks later, Montjeu started 6/4 favourite in a field of fourteen runners on unusually heavy ground. Kinane positioned Montjeu much closer to the lead on this occasion and he turned into the straight in fifth place before being switched to the outside. By this time however, the Japanese challenger El Condor Pasa had opened up a three-length lead and Montjeu had to be driven out to catch him. Montjeu overtook El Condor Pasa 100 m from the finish and won by half a length, with a further six lengths back to Croco Rouge in third. The unplaced runners included Daylami and Fantastic Light. Immediately after the race, Kinane described Montjeu as "the best mile-and-a-half horse I have ever sat on." On his final start of the season, Montjeu started favourite for the Japan Cup on 28 November, but finished fourth behind Special Week, Indigenous and High-Rise.

=== 2000: four-year-old season ===
Montjeu stayed in training as a four-year-old and won his first four races. He began his season by moving down in distance to ten furlongs to win the Tattersalls Gold Cup at the Curragh by one and a half lengths from Greek Dance. On 2 July he won the Grand Prix de Saint-Cloud by five lengths from Daring Miss and the 1998 Arc de Triomphe winner Sagamix. Four weeks later he ran in Great Britain for the first time in his career when he contested the King George VI and Queen Elizabeth Stakes at Ascot. Montjeu showed signs of temperament in the preliminaries, as he refused to enter the paddock, but was never in danger in the race itself. Starting at odds of 1/3 he "cruised" into the lead in the straight and won very easily by one and three-quarter lengths from Fantastic Light. Brough Scott, of the Daily Telegraph described the performance as "devastating" and compared Montjeu to past champions such as Ribot, Nijinsky, Mill Reef and Shergar.

Montjeu won the Prix Foy at odds of 1/10 and was then made odds-on favourite to win his second "Arc" in October. He failed to reproduce his best form, however, and finished fourth to Sinndar. He returned to Britain two weeks later for the Champion Stakes and again started favourite, but was beaten half a length by Kalanisi. On his final racecourse appearance three weeks later he finished seventh behind Kalanisi in the Breeders' Cup Turf.

== Assessment ==
At the end of 1999, Montjeu was voted that year's Cartier Three-Year-Old European Champion Colt and World Champion. Montjeu was given an official rating of 135 by the International Classification, making him the highest rated three-year-old of the season, although some, including the Racing Post, felt that the rating underestimated his achievements. Timeform concurred, giving him a mark of 137 in 1999.

Montjeu was known for his idiosyncratic temperament: Kinane explained that the horse had "a few issues", while Hammond called him "an eccentric genius".

== Stud record ==
In 2001, Montjeu was retired to Coolmore Stud in County Tipperary, Ireland. He was one of the top sires in the world and produced several noted champions, including four winners of the Epsom Derby – Motivator, Authorized, Pour Moi and Camelot.

=== Notable progeny ===
c = colt, f = filly, g = gelding

Foaled	Name	Sex	Major Wins
2002	Corre Caminos	c	Prix Ganay
2002	Hurricane Run	c	Irish Derby, Prix de l'Arc de Triomphe, Tattersalls Gold Cup, King George VI and Queen Elizabeth Stakes
2002	Montare	f	Prix Royal-Oak
2002	Motivator	c	Racing Post Trophy, Epsom Derby
2002	Scorpion	c	Grand Prix de Paris, St Leger Stakes, Coronation Cup
2002	Sharvasti	c	Avondale Gold Cup
2004	Authorized	c	Epsom Derby, International Stakes
2004	Hurricane Fly	g	Irish Champion Hurdle (five times), Punchestown Champion Hurdle (four times), December Festival Hurdle (four times), Champion Hurdle (twice), Morgiana Hurdle (three times), Hatton's Grace Hurdle, Royal Bond Novice Hurdle, Future Champions Novice Hurdle, Evening Herald Champion Novice Hurdle (*world record for most Group I wins)
2004	Nom Du Jeu	c	Australian Derby
2004	Speed Gifted	c	AJC Metropolitan Handicap
2005	Frozen Fire	c	Irish Derby
2005	Montmartre	c	Grand Prix de Paris
2005	Roman Emperor	c	Australian Derby
2006	Fame and Glory	c	Irish Derby, Tattersalls Gold Cup, Coronation Cup, Ascot Gold Cup, Long Distance Cup
2006	Jukebox Jury	c	Preis von Europa, Irish St Leger
2006	Tavistock	c	Waikato Sprint
2007	Jan Vermeer	c	Critérium International
2007	Miss Keller	f	E.P. Taylor Stakes
2007	Joshua Tree	c	Canadian International Stakes (3 times)
2008	Sarah Lynx	f	Canadian International Stakes
2007	St Nicholas Abbey	c	Racing Post Trophy, Coronation Cup (3 times), Breeders' Cup Turf, Dubai Sheema Classic
2007	Green Moon	c	Turnbull Stakes, Melbourne Cup
2008	Masked Marvel	c	St Leger Stakes
2008	Pour Moi	c	Epsom Derby
2008	Recital	c	Critérium de Saint-Cloud
2009	Camelot	c	Racing Post Trophy, 2000 Guineas, Epsom Derby, Irish Derby
2009	The Offer	g	Sydney Cup
2010	Chicquita	f	Irish Oaks
2010	Leading Light	c	St Leger Stakes, Ascot Gold Cup
2011	Bracelet	f	Irish Oaks
2011	Gallante	c	Grand Prix de Paris, Sydney Cup

As of 29 March 2012, he had produced 35 individual Group 1 winners and the winners of over £14m.

== In popular culture ==
Montjeu appears in Cygames' Umamusume: Pretty Derby franchise as an anthropomorphized non-trainable boss character in the video game, particularly in the story scenario "Reach for the Stars: Project l'Arc" where the player must train their selected umamusume to run in the Prix de l'Arc de Triomphe. Prior to this, a character based on Montjeu (renamed Broye) appeared in the first season of the anime during the finale episodes depicting the 1999 Japan Cup, as Cygames did not yet have the rights to use the horse at the time. However, Cygames was eventually able to get the rights and added Montjeu to the game in 2023.

== Pedigree ==
Pedigree of Montjeu
Sire Sadler's Wells b. 1981	Northern Dancer b. 1961	Nearctic	Nearco
Sire Sadler's Wells b. 1981	Northern Dancer b. 1961	Nearctic	Lady Angela
Sire Sadler's Wells b. 1981	Northern Dancer b. 1961	Natalma	Native Dancer
Sire Sadler's Wells b. 1981	Northern Dancer b. 1961	Natalma	Almahmoud
Sire Sadler's Wells b. 1981	Fairy Bridge b. 1975	Bold Reason	Hail to Reason
Sire Sadler's Wells b. 1981	Fairy Bridge b. 1975	Bold Reason	Lalun
Sire Sadler's Wells b. 1981	Fairy Bridge b. 1975	Special	Forli
Sire Sadler's Wells b. 1981	Fairy Bridge b. 1975	Special	Thong
Dam Floripedes b. 1985	Top Ville b. 1976	High Top	Derring-Do
Dam Floripedes b. 1985	Top Ville b. 1976	High Top	Camanae
Dam Floripedes b. 1985	Top Ville b. 1976	Sega Ville	Charlottesville
Dam Floripedes b. 1985	Top Ville b. 1976	Sega Ville	La Sega
Dam Floripedes b. 1985	Toute Cy b. 1979	Tennyson	Val de Loir
Dam Floripedes b. 1985	Toute Cy b. 1979	Tennyson	Tidra
Dam Floripedes b. 1985	Toute Cy b. 1979	Adele Toumignon	Zeddaan
Dam Floripedes b. 1985	Toute Cy b. 1979	Adele Toumignon	Alvorada (Family 1-u)
