= Sultanina (horse) =

British-bred Thoroughbred racehorse

- Sire: New Approach
- Grandsire: Galileo
- Dam: Soft Centre
- Damsire: Zafonic
- Sex: Mare
- Foaled: 11 March 2010
- Country: United Kingdom
- Colour: Chestnut
- Breeder: Normandie Stud
- Owner: Normandie Stud
- Trainer: John Gosden
- Record: 6: 3-1-0
- Earnings: £180,718

Major wins
- Pinnacle Stakes (2014); Nassau Stakes (2014)

Sultanina (foaled 11 March 2010) is a British Thoroughbred racehorse and broodmare. She missed her two- and three-year-old seasons before making her debut as a four-year-old in 2014. She made an immediate impact, winning three of her four races in England including the Pinnacle Stakes and the Nassau Stakes. She also finished second in the Lancashire Oaks. Sultanina failed to place in two races in France later that year and was retired at the end of the year.

== Background ==
Sultanina is a chestnut mare with a white star and white socks on her hind feet bred in the United Kingdom by the Normandie Stud of Kirdford, West Sussex. She was from the first crop of foal sired by New Approach a horse which won four Group One races including The Derby, and was the equal highest-rated Thoroughbred in the world when trained by Jim Bolger in 2008. Other products of New Approach's first crop included Dawn Approach and Talent. Sultanina's dam Soft Centre showed good ability as a racemare, winning the Lupe Stakes as a three-year-old in 2005. She was daughter of Foodbroker Fancy, who also won the Lupe Stakes and was a descendant of the 1000 Guineas winner Belle of All.

The filly was sent into training with John Gosden in Newmarket.

== Racing career ==
=== 2014:four-year-old season ===
Sultanina had training problems, including "sore shins" which kept her off the racecourse until she was four years old. She made her debut in a weight-for-age maiden race for fillies over ten furlongs at Salisbury Racecourse on 15 May, in which she started at odds of 9/2 against ten opponents. Ridden by William Buick, she showed her inexperience "raced green" in the early stages but produced a strong finish to win by a neck from the three-year-old Desert Snow. After the race the Normandie Stud's owner Philippa Cooper reportedly told Gosden than Sultanina was the best filly she had ever bred. Buick was again in the saddle when the filly was moved up sharply in class for the Group Three Pinnacle Stakes over one and a half miles at Haydock Park sixteen days later. She started at odds of 10/1 in an eleven-runner field with her opponents including Astonishing (winner of the Princess Royal Stakes), Cubanita (St Simon Stakes, John Porter Stakes) and Moment in Time (winner of the race in 2013). Sultanina started slowly as the outsider Special Meaning set the pace, but began to make progress in the straight and moved into second approaching the final furlong. The Gosden stable's other runner Freedom's Light had taken the lead but Sultanina stayed on strongly to catch her stablemate in the final stride and won by a short head, with Silk Sari in third. Commenting on his decision to ride Sultanina ahead of Freedom's Light, Buick said "It was a very hard choice and there was nothing in it" and added "I knew it was close and I would have been disappointed if she got beat. She was still very green". Philippa Cooper said "I can’t believe it. I didn’t think she’d won. When they called number 11 I nearly threw up!"

Robert Havlin took over rom Buick when Sultanina was moved up to Group Two class for the Lancashire Oaks at Haydock on 5 July. Silk Sari, Astonishing and Moment in Time were again in opposition whilst the other runners included the British Champions Fillies' and Mares' Stakes winner Seal of Approval (the 15/8 favourite), Talent and Pomology, the Gosden stable's unbeaten Prix de Minerve winner. After stracking the leaders, Sultanina stayed on well in the straight without looking likely to win and finished second, beaten two and a quarter lengths by Pomology. Despite her defeat, Sultanina was stepped up to Group One level for the Nassau Stakes at Goodwood Racecourse on 2 August in which she was reunited with Buick and started the 11/2 fourth choice in a six-runner field. The French filly Narniyn (Prix de Flore, La Coupe) ahead of the Irish challenger Venus de Milo (Munster Oaks) and Mango Diva (Kilboy Estate Stakes) while the other two runners were Eastern Belle (Ballymacoll Stud Stakes) and Lustrous (Michael Seely Memorial Stakes). Sultanina stumbled at the start but recovered to track the leaders before making a strong run in the straight. She moved into second place behind Narniyn approaching the final furlong, overtook the French filly 75 yards from the finish and drew away to win by one and a half lengths. Gosden, who was winning his third consecutive Nassau Stakes, said "Her stamina kicked in today in the final furlong and she has beaten a tough nut of a filly who brought good solid form to the table".

Sultanina ran twice in France after her win in the Nassau Stakes but failed to reproduce her earlier success. In a strongly-contested Prix Vermeille at Longchamp Racecourse on 14 September in which she was ridden by Ryan Moore she finished fifth in a close finish behind Baltic Baroness, Pomology, Dolniya and Treve. In the Prix de l'Opéra over 2000 metres at the same track in October he faded badly in the closing stages and finished tenth of the eleven runners.

== Breeding record ==
Sultanina was retired from racing and returned to her birthplace to become a broodmare at the Normandie Stud. She was covered by Dansili in 2015 and was scheduled to visit Muhaarar in 2016.

== Pedigree ==
Pedigree of Sultanina (GB), chestnut filly, 2010
Sire New Approach (IRE) 2005	Galileo (IRE); 1998	Sadler's Wells	Northern Dancer
Sire New Approach (IRE) 2005	Galileo (IRE); 1998	Sadler's Wells	Fairy Bridge
Sire New Approach (IRE) 2005	Galileo (IRE); 1998	Urban Sea	Miswaki
Sire New Approach (IRE) 2005	Galileo (IRE); 1998	Urban Sea	Allegretta
Sire New Approach (IRE) 2005	Park Express (IRE); 1983	Ahonoora	Lorenzaccio
Sire New Approach (IRE) 2005	Park Express (IRE); 1983	Ahonoora	Helen Nichols
Sire New Approach (IRE) 2005	Park Express (IRE); 1983	Matcher	Match
Sire New Approach (IRE) 2005	Park Express (IRE); 1983	Matcher	Lachine
Dam Soft Centre (GB) 2003	Zafonic (USA); 1990	Gone West	Mr. Prospector
Dam Soft Centre (GB) 2003	Zafonic (USA); 1990	Gone West	Secrettame
Dam Soft Centre (GB) 2003	Zafonic (USA); 1990	Zaizafon	The Minstrel
Dam Soft Centre (GB) 2003	Zafonic (USA); 1990	Zaizafon	Mofida
Dam Soft Centre (GB) 2003	Foodbroker Fancy (IRE); 1998	Halling	Diesis
Dam Soft Centre (GB) 2003	Foodbroker Fancy (IRE); 1998	Halling	Dance Machine
Dam Soft Centre (GB) 2003	Foodbroker Fancy (IRE); 1998	Red Rita	Kefaah
Dam Soft Centre (GB) 2003	Foodbroker Fancy (IRE); 1998	Red Rita	Katie Roche (Family: 3-g)
