= 2008 Epsom Derby =

- Location: Epsom Downs Racecourse
- Date: 7 June 2008
- Winning horse: New Approach
- Starting price: 5/1
- Jockey: Kevin Manning
- Trainer: Jim Bolger
- Owner: Haya bint Hussein

Epsom Derby 2008
1-2-3
New Approach	Tartan Bearer	Casual Conquest

Also Ran
4-5-6
Doctor Fremantle	Washington Irving	Alessandro Volta
7-8-9
Rio De La Plata	Tajaaweed	Bouguereau
10-11-12
Curtain Call	Frozen Fire	King Of Rome
13-14-15
Alan Devonshire	Kandahar Run	Bashkirov
16
Maidstone Mixture	16 Ran	2m 36.50s

The 2008 Epsom Derby was a horse race which took place at Epsom Downs on Saturday 7 June 2008. It was the 229th running of the Derby, and it was won by New Approach. The winner was ridden by Kevin Manning and trained by Jim Bolger. The pre-race favourite Casual Conquest finished third.

== Race details ==
- Sponsor: Vodafone
- Winner's prize money: £802,444
- Going: Good
- Number of runners: 16
- Winner's time: 2m 36.50s

== Full result ==
	*	Horse	Jockey	Trainer ^{†}	SP
1		New Approach	Kevin Manning	Jim Bolger (IRE)	5/1
2	½	Tartan Bearer	Ryan Moore	Sir Michael Stoute	6/1
3	4½	Casual Conquest	Pat Smullen	Dermot Weld (IRE)	7/2 fav
4	1½	Doctor Fremantle	Kerrin McEvoy	Sir Michael Stoute	11/2
5	¾	Washington Irving	Colm O'Donoghue	Aidan O'Brien (IRE)	33/1
6	shd	Alessandro Volta	Seamie Heffernan	Aidan O'Brien (IRE)	33/1
7	1	Rio de la Plata	Frankie Dettori	Saeed bin Suroor	20/1
8	½	Tajaaweed	Richard Hills	Sir Michael Stoute	10/1
9	½	Bouguereau	Alan Munro	Peter Chapple-Hyam	100/1
10	1¼	Curtain Call	Jamie Spencer	Luca Cumani	7/1
11	1¼	Frozen Fire	Michael Kinane	Aidan O'Brien (IRE)	16/1
12	9	King of Rome	Johnny Murtagh	Aidan O'Brien (IRE)	16/1
13	4½	Alan Devonshire	Paul Mulrennan	Mark Tompkins	100/1
14	14	Kandahar Run	Ted Durcan	Henry Cecil	11/1
15	11	Bashkirov	David McCabe	Aidan O'Brien (IRE)	125/1
16	39	Maidstone Mixture	Michael O'Connell	Paul Murphy	250/1

* The distances between the horses are shown in lengths or shorter – shd = short-head
† Trainers are based in Great Britain unless indicated

== Winner's details ==
Further details of the winner, New Approach:

- Foaled: 18 February 2005 in Ireland
- Sire: Galileo; Dam: Park Express (Ahonoora)
- Owner: Princess Haya of Jordan
- Breeder: Lodge Park Stud
- Rating in 2008 World Thoroughbred Rankings: 130

== Form analysis ==
=== Two-year-old races ===
Notable runs by the future Derby participants as two-year-olds in 2007.

- New Approach – 1st Tyros Stakes, 1st Futurity Stakes, 1st National Stakes, 1st Dewhurst Stakes
- Alessandro Volta – 1st Eyrefield Stakes
- Rio de la Plata – 1st Vintage Stakes, 2nd National Stakes, 1st Prix Jean-Luc Lagardère, 4th Dewhurst Stakes
- Tajaaweed – 10th Racing Post Trophy
- Curtain Call – 2nd Futurity Stakes, 1st Beresford Stakes, 5th Racing Post Trophy
- Frozen Fire – 8th Racing Post Trophy
- King of Rome – 11th Racing Post Trophy
- Alan Devonshire – 3rd Silver Tankard Stakes

=== The road to Epsom ===
Early-season appearances in 2008 and trial races prior to running in the Derby.

- New Approach – 2nd 2,000 Guineas, 2nd Irish 2,000 Guineas
- Tartan Bearer – 1st Dante Stakes
- Casual Conquest – 1st Derrinstown Stud Derby Trial
- Doctor Fremantle – 1st Chester Vase
- Washington Irving – 2nd Derrinstown Stud Derby Trial
- Alessandro Volta – 4th Ballysax Stakes, 1st Lingfield Derby Trial
- Rio de la Plata – 2nd Poule d'Essai des Poulains
- Tajaaweed – 1st Dee Stakes
- Bouguereau – 7th Derby Italiano
- Curtain Call – 1st Intercasino.co.uk Conditions Stakes
- Frozen Fire – 2nd Dante Stakes
- King of Rome – 5th Ballysax Stakes, 2nd Lingfield Derby Trial
- Alan Devonshire – 4th Lingfield Derby Trial
- Kandahar Run – 2nd Feilden Stakes, 1st Newmarket Stakes

=== Subsequent Group 1 wins ===
Group 1 / Grade I victories after running in the Derby.

- New Approach – Irish Champion Stakes (2008), Champion Stakes (2008)
- Casual Conquest – Tattersalls Gold Cup (2009)
- Frozen Fire – Irish Derby (2008)

== Subsequent breeding careers ==
Leading progeny of participants in the 2008 Epsom Derby.

=== Sires of Classic winners ===
New Approach (1st)

- Dawn Approach - 1st 2000 Guineas Stakes (2013)
- Talent - 1st Epsom Oaks (2013)
- Masar - 1st Epsom Derby (2018)
- Winters Moon - 3rd Fillies' Mile (2014) dam of Earthlight (1st Middle Park Stakes 2019)

=== Other Stallions ===
Rio De La Plata (7th) - Settle For Bay (1st Royal Hunt Cup 2018) - Exported to Sweden
Tartan Bearer (2nd) - Exported to New Zealand
Doctor Fremantle (4th) - Exported to Venezuela
Tajaaweed (8th) - Exported to Saudi Arabia
Frozen Fire (11th) - Minor jumps winners
Kandahar Run (14th) - Minor flat and jumps winners
Bashkirov (15th) - Minor flat and jumps runners
