= Covert Love =

Irish-bred Thoroughbred racehorse

- Racing silks of FOMO Syndicate
- Sire: Azamour
- Grandsire: Night Shift
- Dam: Wing Stealth
- Damsire: Hawk Wing
- Sex: Mare
- Foaled: 14 April 2012
- Country: Ireland
- Colour: Bay
- Breeder: Sommerville Bloodstock
- Owner: Fomo Syndicate
- Trainer: Hugo Palmer
- Record: 8: 5-1-0
- Earnings: £503,769

Major wins
- Hoppings Stakes (2015); Irish Oaks (2015); Prix de l'Opéra (2015)

Covert Love (foaled 14 April 2012) is an Irish-bred, British-trained Thoroughbred racehorse and broodmare. After being sold relatively cheaply as a yearling she showed some promise when finishing fifth in her only start as a two-year-old in 2014. In the following year she made rapid improvement, winning two minor races before winning the Hoppings Stakes and then stepping up to Group 1 class to take the Irish Oaks. She added a second Group 1 win in autumn when she won the Prix de l'Opéra in France. She was retired from racing in 2016 and was exported to become a broodmare in Japan.

== Background ==
Covert Love is a bay mare with a white blaze and three white socks bred in County Cork by Sommerville Bloodstock. As a yearling in October 2013 she was sent to the Goffs Orby sale and was bought for €26,000 by the bloodstock agent Hugo Merry. Merry was one of the partners in Sommerville Bloodstock and a member of the Fomo Syndicate which owned the filly throughout her racing career. She was sent into training with Hugo Palmer at Newmarket, Suffolk.

Covert Love was from one of the last crops of foals sired by Azamour whose wins included the St. James's Palace Stakes, Irish Champion Stakes, Prince of Wales's Stakes and King George VI and Queen Elizabeth Stakes. As a breeding stallion, his other offspring included Valyra, Dolniya (Sheema Classic) and Zarkandar. Covert Love's dam Wing Stealth showed no racing ability, failing to win in nine starts, but was a half-sister to the dam of Grey Swallow and a descendant of the American broodmare Stolen Hour (foaled 1953) who was the ancestor of numerous major winners including El Gran Senor, Try My Best, Spinning World, Jazil, Peeping Fawn, Xaar and Rags to Riches.

== Racing career ==
=== 2014: two-year-old season ===
Covert Love made her track debut in a maiden race over one mile on the synthetic polytrack surface at Lingfield Park Racecourse on 21 October in which she was ridden by Noel Garbutt. She started a 33/1 outsider and finished fifth of the twelve runners behind the John Gosden-trained Taysh.

=== 2015: three-year-old season ===
==== Spring ====
On 6 May 2015, Covert Love began her second season in a maiden over ten furlongs on the synthetic track at Chelmsford City Racecourse and started the 9/4 favourite against twelve opponents. Ridden by William Buick she started slowly but recovered to take the lead inside the final furlong and won "going away" by one and a quarter lengths. The filly had her first run on turf of 30 May when she was assigned a weight of 128 pounds in a handicap over ten and a half furlongs at York Racecourse. With Martin Harley in the saddle she raced in second place before taking the lead two furlongs out and won by one and a half lengths from Tazffin.

==== Summer ====
On her next appearance, Covert Love was stepped up in class for the Hoppings Stakes at Newcastle Racecourse in which she was matched against older fillies and mares. She was sent to the front from the start by her rider Graham Gibbons and held off a challenge from the four-year-old favourite Talmada to win by a length. The filly was then moved up to the highest level when she was sent to Ireland to contest the Group 1 Irish Oaks at the Curragh on 18 July. The Ribblesdale Stakes winner Curvy started favourite ahead of Words (Munster Oaks) and Jack Naylor (Silver Flash Stakes) with Covert Love next in the betting on 7/1 alongside Together Forever. The other British-trained challengers in the nine-runner field were the Ballymacoll Stud Stakes winner Speedy Boarding and the John Gosden-trained Gretchen. Together Forever went to the front soon after the start and opened up a big lead with Covert Love settled in second place by her Irish jockey Pat Smullen (who rode her in all of her subsequent starts). Covert Love stayed on in the straight as the leader faltered, took the lead a furlong out and won by one and three quarter lengths and a head from Jack Naylor and Curvy. Smullen commented "We were very confident the filly would stay. Her stamina was unbelievable. She was in serious form... and there's more improvement in her". Hugo Palmer, who was winning his first classic race said "I’m to be married next Saturday so this is the last time I can ever say this is the best day of my life. I’m terrified I’ll wake up and find myself still in my bed in Newmarket. I couldn’t be more excited".

On 20 August Covert Love started 15/8 favourite against ten opponents including Jack Naylor and Curvy in the Yorkshire Oaks at York. She went to the front a furlong out, but in a blanket finish she was overtaken and beaten a neck by Pleascach with Sea Calisi and Curvy just behind.

==== Autumn ====
On 4 October Covert Love was sent to France for the Prix de l'Opéra over 2000 metres at Longchamp Racecourse and started the 4/1 joint-favourite alongside her fellow British raider Jazzi Top (Prix de la Nonette). The other eleven runners included the Group 1 winners Queen's Jewel (Prix Saint-Alary), We Are (winner of the race in 2014), Star of Seville, Diamondsandrubies (Pretty Polly Stakes) and Odeliz (Prix Jean Romanet). Covert Love took the lead soon after the start and maintained her advantage into the straight where Jazzi Top emerged as her only serious challenger. Jazzi Top took the lead in the last 200 metres but Covert Love rallied "tenaciously" to regain the advantage and win by a head. After the race Palmer said "I'm lost for words. My god, she tries. What a ride, what a jockey. Three times I thought she was done in the straight but she found, found, found. I can't say much more!"

Thirteen days after her win in France, Covert Love started favourite against eleven opponents in the British Champions Fillies & Mares Stakes at Ascot Racecourse. After tracking the leaders she stayed on in the straight without looking likely to win and finished fourth behind Simple Verse, Journey and Beautiful Romance. The unplaced horses included Arabian Queen, Sea Calisi, Tapestry, Speedy Boarding and Madame Chiang.

=== 2015: four-year-old season ===
Covert Love remained in training in 2015 but never made it back to the racecourse owing to injury. Her retirement was announced in June with Palmer explaining "Covert Love has picked up an injury, a strained ligament. It's the sort of injury that if she was a gelding you would say, well, she's going to be off for the year and who knows we might win the Melbourne Cup in 2017 or something like that, but with a Classic-winning broodmare prospect that's not the sort of thing you do because it's too high a risk". In the following month she was sold to Northern Farm and was exported to become a broodmare in Japan.

== Pedigree ==
Pedigree of Covert Love (IRE), bay mare, 2012
Sire Azamour (IRE) 2001	Night Shift (USA); 1980	Northern Dancer	Nearctic
Sire Azamour (IRE) 2001	Night Shift (USA); 1980	Northern Dancer	Natalma
Sire Azamour (IRE) 2001	Night Shift (USA); 1980	Ciboulette	Chop Chop
Sire Azamour (IRE) 2001	Night Shift (USA); 1980	Ciboulette	Windy Answer
Sire Azamour (IRE) 2001	Asmara (USA); 1993	Lear Fan	Roberto
Sire Azamour (IRE) 2001	Asmara (USA); 1993	Lear Fan	Wac
Sire Azamour (IRE) 2001	Asmara (USA); 1993	Anaza	Darshaan
Sire Azamour (IRE) 2001	Asmara (USA); 1993	Anaza	Azaarika
Dam Wing Stealth (IRE) 2005	Hawk Wing (USA); 1999	Woodman	Mr. Prospector
Dam Wing Stealth (IRE) 2005	Hawk Wing (USA); 1999	Woodman	Playmate
Dam Wing Stealth (IRE) 2005	Hawk Wing (USA); 1999	La Lorgnette	Val de l'Orne
Dam Wing Stealth (IRE) 2005	Hawk Wing (USA); 1999	La Lorgnette	The Temptress
Dam Wing Stealth (IRE) 2005	Starlight Smile (USA); 1997	Green Dancer	Nijinsky
Dam Wing Stealth (IRE) 2005	Starlight Smile (USA); 1997	Green Dancer	Green Valley
Dam Wing Stealth (IRE) 2005	Starlight Smile (USA); 1997	Bubinka	Nashua
Dam Wing Stealth (IRE) 2005	Starlight Smile (USA); 1997	Bubinka	Stolen Date (Family: 8-f)
