= Nezwaah =

British-bred Thoroughbred racehorse

- Sire: Dubawi
- Grandsire: Dubai Millennium
- Dam: Ferdoos
- Damsire: Dansili
- Sex: Mare
- Foaled: 25 February 2013
- Country: United Kingdom
- Colour: Bay
- Breeder: Darley Stud
- Owner: Ahmed Al Maktoum
- Trainer: Roger Varian
- Record: 12: 5-1-1
- Earnings: £220,877

Major wins
- Hoppings Stakes (2016); Rothesay Stakes (2017); Pretty Polly Stakes (2017)

Nezwaah (foaled 25 February 2013) is a British Thoroughbred racehorse. Unraced as a two-year-old she showed promising form as a three-year-old when she won three races including the Listed Hoppings Stakes. She reached her peak in the first half of the 2017 season when she won the Rothesay Stakes before recording her biggest victory in the Group 1 Pretty Polly Stakes. She raced in five countries, namely England, Ireland, France, Canada and the United States.

== Background ==
Nezwaah is a bay mare with white socks on her front and back left legs bred in the United Kingdom by Sheikh Mohammed's Darley Stud. She entered the ownership of Sheikh Mohammed's brother Ahmed Al Maktoum and was sent into training with Roger Varian at Newmarket, Suffolk.

She was from the seventh crop of foals sired by Dubawi, whose wins included the Irish 2,000 Guineas and the Prix Jacques Le Marois. At stud, Dubawi has been a highly successful breeding stallion, siring major winners such as Ghaiyyath, Monterosso, Al Kazeem, Makfi, Old Persian, Lucky Nine and Night of Thunder. Nezwaah's dam Ferdoos showed good racing form in a brief track career, winning three of her five starts including the Listed Pinnacle Stakes. She was descended from the American broodmare Gay Hostess (foaled 1957) making her a relative of Caracolero, Real Quiet, Majestic Prince and Secreto.

== Racing career ==
=== 2016: three-year-old season ===
On her racecourse debut Nezwaah started the 8/11 for a maiden race over one mile on the Polytrack surface at Chelmsford City Racecourse on 6 January 2016 in which she was ridden by Jack Mitchell and won by one and a half lengths from Rahyah after taking the lead inside the final furlong. On 1 February at Wolverhampton Racecourse, with Mitchell again in the saddle, the filly started favourite for a handicap over eight and a half furlongs on Tapeta and overcame a slow start to win "readily" by three and a half lengths. Nezwaah was stepped up in class and distance for her debut on turf and sustained her first defeat as she came home third behind We Are Ninety and Beautiful Moring in the Listed Fillies' Trial Stakes over ten furlongs at Newbury Racecourse on 14 May.

Harry Bentley took the ride when Nezwaah returned to the synthetic track and started the 3/1 favourite for the Listed Hoppings Stakes at Newcastle Racecourse on 24 June when she was matched against older opponents for the first time. After being restrained in the early stages she went to the front approaching the final furlong and drew away in the closing stages to win by three lengths from the four-year-old More Mischief. Andrea Atzeni, who had partnered the Nezwaah at Newbury, rode the filly in all of her subsequent races. She was sent to France in August and finished last of the five runners behind La Cressonniere in the Group 2 Prix de la Nonette at Deauville Racecourse, beaten just over eight lengths by the winner. In the following month she ran second to the Musidora Stakes winner So Mi Dar in the John Musker Fillies' Stakes at Yarmouth Racecourse with Arabian Queen in third. For her final run of the year Nezwaah was sent to Canada to contest the Grade I E. P. Taylor Stakes at Woodbine Racetrack in October and although she never looked likely to win she kept on well in the closing stages to finish seventh, only two lengths behind the winner Al's Gal.

=== 2017: four-year-old season ===
Nezwaah was scheduled to begin her second campaign in the Dahlia Stakes at Newmarket Racecourse on 7 May but was withdrawn from the race after breaking out of the starting stalls in what Roger Varian described as "a freak occurrence". Seventeen days later at Ayr Racecourse the filly started the 1/2 favourite for the Rothesay Stakes in which she faced four opponents including the 2016 winner Maleficent Queen. After tracking the leaders she switched right to obtain a clear run approaching the final furlong, quickly went to the front and pulled clear to win by three and three quarter lengths. After the race Atzeni said "She was the class filly in the race. She settled nicely, which was great, and she picked up well. She's good-minded and hopefully we'll have a lot of fun with her this year".

On 2 July Nezwaah was sent to Ireland to contest the Group 1 Pretty Polly Stakes at the Curragh and started the 13/2 fourth choice in the betting. Journey started favourite, while the other nine runners included Zhukova (Man o' War Stakes), Smart Call (Cape Metropolitan Stakes), Intricately (Moyglare Stud Stakes), Creggs Pipes (Lanwades Stud Stakes) and Turret Rocks (May Hill Stakes). Nezwaah was held up by Atzeni in the early stages as Creggs Pipes set the pace, but began to make strong progress in the last quarter mile and after taking the lead a furlong out she accelerated away from her rivals and won by more than three lengths from Rain Goddess. Atzeni commented: "She was very impressive and travelled beautifully. She was a little bit slow into her stride... but she picked up really well. I got quite a smooth run and just had to wait to get a gap. Two days ago we didn't know if she was going to run or not because of the weather, but Roger felt the ground was going to be fine for her and she's proved him right."

For her next appearance Nezwaah was stepped up in distance for the Yorkshire Oaks over one and a half miles at York Racecourse and came home fourth behind Enable, Coronet and Queen's Trust (Breeders' Cup Filly & Mare Turf). In October she made a second attempt to win the E. P. Taylor Stakes and started favourite but finished fifth behind Blonde Me, beaten more than nine lengths by the winner after fading in the closing stages. For her final run of the year, Nezwaah was sent to California for the Breeders' Cup Filly & Mare Turf at Del Mar Racetrack on 4 November, in which she started at odds of 20/1 and came home tenth of the fourteen runners behind Wuheida.

== Breeding record ==
Nezwaah was retired from racing to become a broodmare for her owner's stud.

== Pedigree ==
Pedigree of Nezwaah (GB), bay mare, 2013
| Sire Dubawi (IRE) 2002 | Dubai Millennium (GB); 1996 | Seeking the Gold (USA) | Mr. Prospector |
| Sire Dubawi (IRE) 2002 | Dubai Millennium (GB); 1996 | Seeking the Gold (USA) | Con Game |
| Sire Dubawi (IRE) 2002 | Dubai Millennium (GB); 1996 | Colorado Dancer (IRE) | Shareef Dancer (USA) |
| Sire Dubawi (IRE) 2002 | Dubai Millennium (GB); 1996 | Colorado Dancer (IRE) | Fall Aspen (USA) |
| Sire Dubawi (IRE) 2002 | Zomaradah (GB); 1995 | Deploy | Shirley Heights |
| Sire Dubawi (IRE) 2002 | Zomaradah (GB); 1995 | Deploy | Slightly Dangerous (USA) |
| Sire Dubawi (IRE) 2002 | Zomaradah (GB); 1995 | Jawaher (IRE) | Dancing Brave (USA) |
| Sire Dubawi (IRE) 2002 | Zomaradah (GB); 1995 | Jawaher (IRE) | High Tern |
| Dam Ferdoos (GB) 2007 | Dansili (GB); 1996 | Danehill (USA) | Danzig |
| Dam Ferdoos (GB) 2007 | Dansili (GB); 1996 | Danehill (USA) | Razyana |
| Dam Ferdoos (GB) 2007 | Dansili (GB); 1996 | Hasili (IRE) | Kahyasi |
| Dam Ferdoos (GB) 2007 | Dansili (GB); 1996 | Hasili (IRE) | Kerali (GB) |
| Dam Ferdoos (GB) 2007 | Blaze of Colour (GB); 2001 | Rainbow Quest (USA) | Blushing Groom (FR) |
| Dam Ferdoos (GB) 2007 | Blaze of Colour (GB); 2001 | Rainbow Quest (USA) | I Will Follow |
| Dam Ferdoos (GB) 2007 | Blaze of Colour (GB); 2001 | Hawait Al Barr | Green Desert (USA) |
| Dam Ferdoos (GB) 2007 | Blaze of Colour (GB); 2001 | Hawait Al Barr | Allegedly Blue (Family: 4-d) |
