= Hedge of Oak Stakes =

Flat horse race in Britain

- Class: Listed
- Location: Haydock Park Racecourse
- Race type: Flat / Thoroughbred
- Sponsor: Betfred
- Website: Ayr

Race information
- Distance: 1m 2f (2,012 metres)
- Surface: Turf
- Track: Left-handed
- Qualification: Four-years-old and up fillies and mares excl G1/G2 winners since 31 August 2020
- Weight: 9 st 2 lb Penalties; 5 lb for Group winners* 3 lb for Listed winners* * after 31 August 2024
- Purse: £70,000 (2025); 1st: £39,697

Rothesay Stakes
2026
Dreamasar	Revoir	Wemightakedlongway

Previous years
2025
Diamond Rain	Running Lion	Place Of Safety
2024
Madame Ambassador	Red Danielle	Snowcapped
2023
Al Husn	Angels Wrath	Jewel In My Crown
2022
My Astra	The Blue Brilliant	Angel Power
2021
Bharani Star	Astadash	A La Voile

2020-2016
2019
Shenanigans	Exhort	Coeur D'Amour
2018
Euro Nightmare	Snowy Winter	Titi Makfi
2017
Nezwaah	Sophie	Maleficent Queen
2016
Maleficent Queen	More Mischief	Namhroodah

The Hedge of Oak Stakes is a Listed flat horse race in Great Britain open to fillies and mares aged four years or older. It is run at Haydock Park over a distance of 1 mile and 2 furlongs (2,012 metres), and it is scheduled to take place each year in May. The race was introduced as a new Listed race in 2016 at Ayr named the Rothesay Stakes. In 2025 it was transferred to Haydock Park and given its present title.

== Records ==
Most successful horse:

- no horse has won this race more than once

Leading jockey (2 wins):

- Andrea Atzeni – Nezwaah (2017), Shenanigans (2019)

Leading trainer (3 wins):

- Roger Varian – Nezwaah (2017), Shenanigans (2019), Al Husn (2023)

== Winners ==
Year	Winner	Age	Jockey	Trainer	Time
2016	Maleficent Queen	4	Phillip Makin	Keith Dalgleish	2:13.02
2017	Nezwaah	4	Andrea Atzeni	Roger Varian	2:08.25
2018	Euro Nightmare	4	Paul Mulrennan	Keith Dalgleish	2:05.39
2019	Shenanigans	5	Andrea Atzeni	Roger Varian	2:06.33
	no race 2020 (Note: The 2020 running was cancelled because of the COVID-19 pandemic in the United Kingdom)
2021	Bharani Star	4	Paul Hanagan	Peter Chapple-Hyam	2:06.44
2022	My Astra	4	Tom Marquand	William Haggas	2:14.05
2023	Al Husn	4	Jim Crowley	Roger Varian	2:08.52
2024	Madame Ambassador	5	Joe Fanning	Charlie Johnston	2:07.50
2025	Diamond Rain	4	William Buick	Charlie Appleby	2:10.63
2026	Dreamasar	4	Kieran Shoemark	Ed Walker	2:14.61

== See also ==
- Horse racing in Great Britain
- List of British flat horse races
