= Hoppings Stakes =

Flat horse race in Britain

Hoppings Stakes
2026
Botagoz	Diamond Rain	Sky Safari

Previous years
2025
Diamond Rain	Tasmania	Charlotte's Web
2024
Tiffany	Darnation	Sea Of Roses
2023
Al Husn	Nashwa	One For Bobby
2022
Poptronic	Rogue Millennium	Pearl Beach
2021
Zeyaadah	Technique	Oriental Mystique

2020-2011
2020
Nkosikazi	Virgin Snow	Look Around
2019
Sun Maiden	Nyaleti	Shenanigans
2018
Smart Call	Rasima	Maid To Remember
2017
More Mischief	Chain Of Daisies	Very Dashing
2016
Nezwaah	More Mischief	Oakley Girl
2015
Covert Love	Talmada	Kleo
2014
Regardez	Regal Hawk	Magic of Reality
2013
Making Eyes	Reckoning	Sound Hearts
2011
Principal Role	Fanditha	Piano

2010-2001
2010
Pachattack	Lady Jane Digby	Honimiere
2009
Lady Jane Digby	Syvilla	Medici Pearl
2008
Classic Remark	Sell Out	Wood Chorus
2007
Mango Mischief	In Safe Hands	Ransom Captive
2006
Pictavia	Reem Three	Mississippi Star
2005
Dash To The Top	La Persiana	Summitville
2004
Ice Palace	Blue Oasis	Cote Quest
2003
Chorist	Monturani	Persian Lass
2002
Esloob	Lady High Havens	Frosty Welcome
2001
Tarfshi	Balladonia	Valentine Band

2000-1999
2000
Amalia	Claxon	Moselle
1999
Fictitious	Maria Isabella	Balladonia

The Hoppings Stakes is a Group 3 flat horse race in Great Britain open to mares and fillies aged three years or older. It is run at Newcastle over a distance of 1 mile 2 furlongs and 42 yards (2,050 metres), and it is scheduled to take place each year in late June. It is named after the annual funfair which takes place each June on Newcastle's Town Moor, the original site of Newcastle racecourse before its move to Gosforth Park.

The race was first run in 1999. It was originally contested at Listed level before being upgraded to Group 3 status in 2018.

== Records ==
Leading jockey (4 wins):

- Jim Crowley – Smart Call (2018), Sun Maiden (2019), Zeyaadah (2021), Al Husn (2023)

Leading trainer (4 wins):

- Roger Varian - Nezwaah (2016), Zeyaadah (2021), Al Husn (2023), Botagoz (2026)

== Winners ==
Year	Winner	Age	Jockey	Trainer	Time
	Turf before 2016
1999	Fictitious	3	Ray Cochrane	Sir Michael Stoute	2:06.80
2000	Amalia	4	Willie Supple	Peter Harris	2:06.60
2001	Tarfshi	3	Philip Robinson	Michael Jarvis	2:07.00
2002	Esloob	3	Richard Hills	Marcus Tregoning	2:10.00
2003	Chorist	4	Kieren Fallon	William Haggas	2:08.24
2004	Ice Palace	4	Eddie Ahern	James Fanshawe	2:14.14
2005	Dash To The Top	3	Joe Fanning	Luca Cumani	2:07.32
2006	Pictavia	4	Frankie Dettori	Saeed bin Suroor	2:07.95
2007	Mango Mischief	6	Kevin Darley	Mick Channon	2:17.08
2008	Classic Remark	3	Micky Fenton	Harry Dunlop	2:12.70
2009	Lady Jane Digby	4	Greg Fairley	Mark Johnston	2:11.51
2010	Pachattack	4	Tom Eaves	Gerard Butler	2:07.94
2011	Principal Role	4	Tom Queally	Sir Henry Cecil	2:09.13
2012	Abandoned due to waterlogging
2013	Making Eyes	5	Joe Fanning	Hugo Palmer	2:13.94
2014	Regardez	3	Graham Gibbons	Ralph Beckett	2:09.16
2015	Covert Love	3	Graham Gibbons	Hugo Palmer	2:07.22
2016	Nezwaah	3	Harry Bentley	Roger Varian	2:07.56
2017	More Mischief	5	Graham Lee	Jedd O'Keeffe	2:07.98
2018	Smart Call	6	Jim Crowley	Sir Michael Stoute	2:11.67
2019	Sun Maiden	4	Jim Crowley	Sir Michael Stoute	2:12.57
2020	Nkosikazi	5	Tom Marquand	William Haggas	2:12.80
2021	Zeyaadah	3	Jim Crowley	Roger Varian	2:09.25
2022	Poptronic	3	Sam James	Karl Burke	2:13.12
2023	Al Husn	4	Jim Crowley	Roger Varian	2:09.23
2024	Tiffany	4	Luke Morris	Sir Mark Prescott	2:08.65
2025	Diamond Rain	4	William Buick	Charlie Appleby	2:12.10
2026	Botagoz	3	Ray Dawson	Roger Varian	2:09.02

== See also ==
- Horse racing in Great Britain
- List of British flat horse races
