= Casual Conquest =

Irish-bred Thoroughbred racehorse

- Sire: Hernando
- Grandsire: Niniski
- Dam: Lady Luck
- Damsire: Kris
- Sex: Gelding
- Foaled: 26 January 2005
- Country: Ireland
- Colour: Bay
- Breeder: Moyglare Stud
- Owner: Moyglare Stud
- Trainer: Dermot Weld
- Record: £720,865
- Earnings: 9: 4-2-2

Major wins
- Derrinstown Stud Derby Trial (2008); Tattersalls Gold Cup (2009); Royal Whip Stakes (2009)

Casual Conquest (born 26 January 2005) was an Irish Thoroughbred racehorse. After winning his only race as a two-year-old in 2007 he made a significant impact on his first appearance at three when he was an impressive winner of the Derrinstown Stud Derby Trial. He finished when favourite for The Derby and ran second in the Irish Derby on his only other start of 2008. As a four-year-old he added wins in the Tattersalls Gold Cup and the Royal Whip Stakes but then sustained a serious leg injury in the Irish Champion Stakes. He was gelded at the end of that year and never raced again.

== Background ==
Casual Conquest was a bay horse with short white socks on his hind legs, bred in Ireland by his owners, the Moyglare Stud. During his track career he was trained by Dermot Weld at the Curragh, County Kildare and was ridden in all of his races by Weld's stable jockey Pat Smullen.

He was from the ninth crop of foals sired by Hernando, a French horse who won the Prix du Jockey Club in 1993. As a breeding stallion Hernando also sired Holding Court, Sulamani and Look Here. Casual Conquest's dam Lady Luck, who produced several other winners including Afternoon Sunlight (Derrinstown Stud 1,000 Guineas Trial) and Elusive Double (Tyros Stakes), won one minor race from two starts as a three-year-old in 1998. She was a descendant of the American broodmare Grenzen (foaled 1975) who was the ancestor of many other good winners including Go And Go, Refuse To Bend and Media Puzzle.

== Racing career ==
=== 2007: two-year-old season ===
On 8 September at Leopardstown Racecourse Casual Conquest began his racing career in a maiden race over seven furlongs and started at odds of 4/1 in a ten-runner field. After racing in fourth place he took the lead in the straight and held of a sustained challenge from the John Oxx-trained Hanoverian Brown to win by a short head.

=== 2008: three-year-old season ===
Casual Conquest began his second season in the Derrinstown Stud Derby Trial over ten furlongs at Leopardstown on 11 May and started at odds of 13/2. The highly regarded Washington Irving (from Aidan O'Brien's Ballydoyle stable) started the odds-on favourite with the best-fancied of the other three runners being the Ballysax Stakes winner Moiqen. He raced towards the rear of the field and appeared to be struggling before beginning to make progress on the outside in the straight. He went to the front inside the last quarter mile and drew right away from his opponents to win "easily" by six lengths from Washington Irving. The result established the colt as a leading contender for the 2008 Epsom Derby even though he had not been entered for the race and could only run if his owners paid a supplementary entry fee of £75,000.

At Epsom Racecourse on 7 June Casual Conquest (with the supplementary entry fee having been paid) started the 7/2 favourite in a sixteen-runner field for the Derby. After being restrained by Shanahan in the early stages he turned into the straight in fourth place and then moved into second behind Tartan Bearer approaching the final furlong. He was unable to quicken in the closing stages and finished third behind New Approach and Tartan Bearer. Twenty-two days later the colt started second favourite behind Tartan Bearer for the Irish Derby at the Curragh. He raced towards the rear of the field before staying on strongly in the straight but baut was beaten two lengths into second place by Frozen Fire. The colt then had training problems and did not race again in 2008.

=== 2009: four-year-old season ===
After an absence of ten months, Casual Conquest returned in the Jockey Club Stakes at Newmarket Racecourse on 2 May. He started odds-on favourite but was defeated by the John Gosden-trained Bronze Cannon. Three weeks later the colt returned to Ireland and was dropped in distance for the Group 1 Tattersalls Gold Cup over ten furlongs at the Curragh and started at odds of 11/4. The favourite was the Weld-trained Famous Name (Leopardstown 2,000 Guineas Trial, Trigo Stakes), while the other three runners were Lush Lashes, Thewayyouare (Critérium International) and Moiqen. In a change of tactics Casual Conquest led from the start before accelerating away from his opponents in the straight, and won by five and a half lengths from his stablemate Famous Name. After the race Dermot Weld said "He deserved that. He's a very good horse from last year. On his reappearance it was very firm ground at Newmarket and my concern today was whether he'd handle the extremely opposite on testing ground. He did it well and I'm very pleased with him. The Arc will be his target".

Two months after his last run, Casual Conquest was dropped in class and started odds on favourite for the Group 3 Meld Stakes at Leopardsown. Carrying top weight of 140 pounds he took the lead in the straight but was overtaken in the closing stages and finished third behind She's Our Mark and Lord Admiral. The Group 3 Royal Whip Stakes over the same distance at the Curragh in August saw the colt start 8/13 favourite against four opponents headed by the Mooresbridge Stakes winner Curtain Call. He took the lead two and a half furlongs and saw off a sustained challenge from Curtain Call to win by one and a quarter lengths with the pair finishing thirteen lengths clear of the rest. Weld commented "Casual Conquest did that nicely as the runner-up is a decent horse. He is ideally suited by soft ground". Casual Conquest returned to Group 1 class for the Irish Champion Stakes in September. He started a 16/1 outsider and never looked likely to win, coming home seventh of the nine runners behind Sea the Stars and sustaining a leg injury in the process.

Any prospects of Casual Conquest embarking on a career as a breeding stallion ended in December 2009 when he underwent a gelding operation. It was hoped that he would resume his track career, possibly under National Hunt rules, but he never raced again.

== Pedigree ==
Pedigree of Casual Conquest (IRE), bay gelding, 2005
Sire Hernando (FR) 1990	Niniski (USA); 1976	Nijinsky	Northern Dancer
Sire Hernando (FR) 1990	Niniski (USA); 1976	Nijinsky	Flaming Page
Sire Hernando (FR) 1990	Niniski (USA); 1976	Virginia Hills	Tom Rolfe
Sire Hernando (FR) 1990	Niniski (USA); 1976	Virginia Hills	Ridin' Easy
Sire Hernando (FR) 1990	Whakilyric (USA); 1984	Miswaki	Mr. Prospector
Sire Hernando (FR) 1990	Whakilyric (USA); 1984	Miswaki	Hopespringseternal
Sire Hernando (FR) 1990	Whakilyric (USA); 1984	Lyrism	Lyphard
Sire Hernando (FR) 1990	Whakilyric (USA); 1984	Lyrism	Pass A Glance
Dam Lady Luck (IRE) 1996	Kris (GB); 1976	Sharpen Up	Atan
Dam Lady Luck (IRE) 1996	Kris (GB); 1976	Sharpen Up	Rocchetta
Dam Lady Luck (IRE) 1996	Kris (GB); 1976	Doubly Sure	Reliance
Dam Lady Luck (IRE) 1996	Kris (GB); 1976	Doubly Sure	Soft Angels
Dam Lady Luck (IRE) 1996	Latest Chapter (IRE); 1989	Ahonoora	Lorenzaccio
Dam Lady Luck (IRE) 1996	Latest Chapter (IRE); 1989	Ahonoora	Helen Nichols
Dam Lady Luck (IRE) 1996	Latest Chapter (IRE); 1989	Irish Edition	Alleged
Dam Lady Luck (IRE) 1996	Latest Chapter (IRE); 1989	Irish Edition	Grenzen (Family 10-a)
