= Duncan (horse) =

British-bred Thoroughbred racehorse

- Sire: Dalakhani (IRE)
- Grandsire: Darshaan (GB)
- Dam: Dolores (GB)
- Damsire: Danehill (USA)
- Sex: Gelding
- Foaled: 30 January 2005
- Country: Great Britain
- Colour: Bay
- Breeder: Normandie Stud
- Owner: Normandie Stud
- Trainer: John Gosden
- Record: 19:6-5-1
- Earnings: £372,000

Major wins
- Irish St. Leger (2011)

Duncan is a thoroughbred racehorse. He won the Irish St. Leger at the Curragh Racecourse in a dead heat with Jukebox Jury.
