= Fallen For You =

British-bred Thoroughbred racehorse

- Sire: Dansili
- Grandsire: Danehill
- Dam: Fallen Star
- Damsire: Brief Truce
- Sex: Mare
- Foaled: 7 April 2009
- Country: United Kingdom
- Colour: Bay
- Breeder: Normandie Stud
- Owner: Normandie Stud
- Trainer: John Gosden
- Record: 7: 3-1-0
- Earnings: £183,240

Major wins
- Coronation Stakes (2012)

Fallen For You (foaled 7 April 2009) is a British Thoroughbred racehorse and broodmare. After winning on her racecourse debut she finished second in the May Hill Stakes before finishing fifth in the Fillies' Mile. She began her three-year-old racing on synthetic tracks, winning a minor race at Kempton before returning to the turf to record her biggest win in the Coronation Stakes at Royal Ascot. She was retired from racing at the end of the year.

== Background ==
Fallen For You is a bay mare with a white star and a white sock on her left hind leg bred and owned by the West Sussex-based Normandie Stud. She was sired by Dansili, whose other progeny have included Harbinger, The Fugue, Dank, Miss France and Rail Link. Fallen For You's dam Fallen Star won three of her nine races including the Summer Mile Stakes and finished fourth in both the Nassau Stakes and the Sun Chariot Stakes. Fallen Star's dam Rise and Fall, bred by Elizabeth II, produced several other winners including the Lockinge Stakes winner Fly to the Stars and was a granddaughter of the influential broodmare Highlight, whose other descendants have included Deep Impact and Nashwan.

The filly was sent into training with John Gosden at Newmarket, Suffolk. She was ridden in all but one of her races by William Buick.

== Racing career ==
=== 2011: two-year-old season ===
On her racecourse debut, Fallen For You started the 5/2 favourite for a maiden race over seven furlongs at Newmarket Racecourse on 30 July 2011. She started slowly but recovered to take the lead inside the final furlong and won "readily" by two lengths from Rythmic [sic]. She was then moved up in class and distance and started favourite for the Group Two May Hill Stakes over one mile at Doncaster Racecourse on 9 September. After being restrained by Buick in the early stages she made progress in the straight but was beaten a neck by the Godolphin filly Lyric of Light, having been hampered when the winner hung to the right in the closing stages. The third placed Samitar went on to win the Irish 1,000 Guineas and the Garden City Stakes. Two weeks later, Fallen For You contested the Fillies' Mile at Newmarket but failed to reproduce her earlier form and finished fifth of the eight runners behind Lyric of Light.

=== 2012: three-year-old season ===
Fallen For You began her second season in a one-mile race on the polytrack surface at Kempton Park Racecourse on 2 May in which she was ridden by Ryan Moore. Starting the 1/5 favourite she took the lead after two furlongs and drew away in the closing stages to win by three and a quarter lengths from Gifted Girl. Ten days later she started joint-favourite for the Chartwell Fillies' Stakes over seven furlongs on the polytrack surface at Lingfield Park Racecourse in which she raced against older fillies and mares. She finished in a dead heat for sixth behind the five-year-old mare Chachamaidee after colliding with the rail two furlongs from the finish.

On 22 June, Fallen For You returned to the turf to contest the Group One Coronation Stakes over one mile at Royal Ascot. The 1000 Guineas winner Homecoming Queen was made favourite ahead of the Prix de Sandringham winner Laugh Out Loud and Samitar with Fallen For You starting at odds of 12/1. The other runners included Fallen For You's stablemate Starscope (second in the 1000 Guineas), the Premio Dormello winner Bugie d'Amore and the Godolphin contender Irish History. Buick restrained Fallen For You towards the rear of the field before switching her to the outside to make her challenge in the straight. The filly took the lead approaching the final furlong and drew away to win by three and a quarter lengths from Starscope, with Irish History a further two and a quarter lengths away in third place. Gosden commented "We always thought she was our best filly last year. She had a holiday and then when she came back Ryan won on her at Kempton. I ran her behind older fillies last time and she learned a lot. We were ready for a big run and she is classy".

In August, Fallen For You was sent to France and matched against colts and older horses in the Prix Jacques Le Marois at Deauville Racecourse. She never looked likely to make a serious challenge and finished thirteenth of the fourteen runners behind Excelebration.

== Assessment ==
In the 2012 World Thoroughbred Rankings Fallen For You was given a rating of 116, making her the sixth-best three-year-old filly in the world.

== Breeding record ==
Fallen For You was retired from racing to become a broodmare at the Normandie Stud.

== Pedigree ==
Pedigree of Fallen For You (GB), bay filly, 2009
| Sire Dansili (GB) 1996 | Danehill (USA); 1986 | Danzig | Northern Dancer |
| Sire Dansili (GB) 1996 | Danehill (USA); 1986 | Danzig | Pas de Nom |
| Sire Dansili (GB) 1996 | Danehill (USA); 1986 | Razyana | His Majesty |
| Sire Dansili (GB) 1996 | Danehill (USA); 1986 | Razyana | Spring Adieu |
| Sire Dansili (GB) 1996 | Hasili (IRE); 1991 | Kahyasi | Ile de Bourbon |
| Sire Dansili (GB) 1996 | Hasili (IRE); 1991 | Kahyasi | Kadissya |
| Sire Dansili (GB) 1996 | Hasili (IRE); 1991 | Kerali | High Line |
| Sire Dansili (GB) 1996 | Hasili (IRE); 1991 | Kerali | Sookera |
| Dam Fallen Star (GB) 1998 | Brief Truce (USA); 1989 | Irish River | Riverman |
| Dam Fallen Star (GB) 1998 | Brief Truce (USA); 1989 | Irish River | Irish Star |
| Dam Fallen Star (GB) 1998 | Brief Truce (USA); 1989 | Falafel | Northern Dancer |
| Dam Fallen Star (GB) 1998 | Brief Truce (USA); 1989 | Falafel | Queen's Statute |
| Dam Fallen Star (GB) 1998 | Rise and Fall (GB); 1984 | Mill Reef | Never Bend |
| Dam Fallen Star (GB) 1998 | Rise and Fall (GB); 1984 | Mill Reef | Milan Mill |
| Dam Fallen Star (GB) 1998 | Rise and Fall (GB); 1984 | Light Duty | Queen's Hussar |
| Dam Fallen Star (GB) 1998 | Rise and Fall (GB); 1984 | Light Duty | Highlight (Family 2-f) |
