= Princess Royal Stakes =

Flat horse race in Britain

- Class: Group 3
- Location: Rowley Mile; Newmarket, England
- Race type: Flat / Thoroughbred
- Sponsor: BoyleSports
- Website: Newmarket

Race information
- Distance: 1m 4f (2,414 metres)
- Surface: Turf
- Track: Right-hand "L"
- Qualification: Three-years-old and up fillies and mares
- Weight: 8 st 12 lb (3yo); 9 st 5 lb (4yo+); Penalties; 7 lb for Group 2 winners * 5 lb for Group 2 winners * 3 lb for Group 3 winners* * since 31 March
- Purse: £85,000 (2025); 1st: £78,696

Princess Royal Stakes
2026
Coedana	Inis Mor	Venetia

Previous years
2025
Silent Love	Karmology	Revoir
2024
Time Lock	Comic Book	Place Of Safety
2023
Time Lock	Sweet Memories	Running Lion
2022
Eternal Pearl	Peripatetic	Sea Silk Road
2021
Forbearance	Sayyida	Sea La Rosa

2020-2011
2020
Antonia De Vega	Alpinista	Sea of Faith
2019
Spirit Of Appin	Simply Beautiful	Promissory
2018
Highgarden	Mrs Sippy	Crimson Rosette
2017
Apphia	Pleasant Surprise	To Eternity
2016
Journey	Lady Of Camelot	Beautiful Romance
2015
Journey	Desert Snow	Namhroodah
2014
Queen Of Ice	Jordan Princess	Vanity Rules
2013
Astonishing	Songbird	Special Meaning
2012
Gallipot	Albamara	Lily In Pink
2011
Mohedian Lady	Imperial Pippin	Cill Rialaig

2010-2007
2010
Polly's Mark	Ferdoos	Snoqualmie Girl
2009
Spirit Of Dubai	Polly's Mark	Mischief Making
2008
Crystal Capella	Under The Rainbow	Ronaldsay
2007
Brisk Breeze	All My Loving	Under The Rainbow

The Princess Royal Stakes is a Group 3 flat horse race in Great Britain open to fillies and mares aged three years or older. It is run over a distance of 1 mile and 4 furlongs (2,414 metres) on the Rowley Mile at Newmarket in September.

The title "Princess Royal Stakes" was originally used for a Group 3 race of similar conditions and distance held at Ascot Racecourse. In 2008, this race was renamed the Pride Stakes and transferred to Newmarket. Meanwhile, Ascot's Harvest Stakes, a Listed race, was rebranded as the "new" Princess Royal Stakes. The Pride Stakes subsequently returned to Ascot and became the British Champions Fillies' and Mares' Stakes, while the Princess Royal Stakes was moved to Newmarket. It was upgraded to Group 3 status in 2017.

== Winners ==
Year	Winner	Age	Jockey	Trainer	Time
2007	Brisk Breeze	3	Ted Durcan	Henry Cecil	2:36.32
2008	Crystal Capella	3	Ryan Moore	Sir Michael Stoute	2:31.50
2009	Spirit Of Dubai	3	William Buick	David Simcock	2:30.26
2010	Polly's Mark	4	Richard Hughes	Clive Cox	2:36.58
2011	Mohedian Lady	3	Kieren Fallon	Luca Cumani	2:26.07
2012	Gallipot	3	William Buick	John Gosden	2:28.50
2013	Astonishing	3	Ryan Moore	Sir Michael Stoute	2:30.85
2014	Queen Of Ice	3	Richard Hughes	William Haggas	2:27.55
2015	Journey	3	Robert Havlin	John Gosden	2:30.46
2016	Journey	4	Frankie Dettori	John Gosden	2:29.81
2017	Apphia	3	Josephine Gordon	Hugo Palmer	2:33.73
2018	Highgarden	3	Frankie Dettori	John Gosden	2:33.28
2019	Spirit Of Appin	4	Martin Dwyer	Brian Meehan	2:29.68
2020	Antonia De Vega	4	Harry Bentley	Ralph Beckett	2:27.58
2021	Forebearance	4	Shane Foley	Jessica Harrington	2:27.91
2022	Eternal Pearl	3	William Buick	Charlie Appleby	2:31.68
2023	Time Lock	4	Ryan Moore	Harry & Roger Charlton	2:26.91
2024	Time Lock	5	Ryan Moore	Harry Charlton	2:38.72
2025	Silent Love	3	Billy Loughnane	Charlie Appleby	2:33.06
2026	Coedana	4	Connor Beasley	Edward Bethell	2:28.61

== See also ==
- Horse racing in Great Britain
- List of British flat horse races
