= Lester Piggott Stakes =

Flat horse race in Britain

- Class: Group 3
- Location: Haydock Park; Haydock, England
- Inaugurated: 2003
- Race type: Flat / Thoroughbred
- Sponsor: Betfred
- Website: Haydock Park

Race information
- Distance: 1m 3f 175y (2,373 m)
- Surface: Turf
- Track: Left-handed
- Qualification: Four-years-old and up fillies and mares
- Weight: 9 st 2 lb Penalties; 7 lb for Group 1 winners * 5 lb for Group 2 winners * 3 lb for Group 3 winners * * since 31 August last year
- Purse: £85,000 (2025); 1st: £48,204

BetVictor Pinnacle Stakes
2023
| Sea Silk Road | Nachtrose | Poptronic |

Previous years
2022
| Sea La Rosa | Viola | Nell Quickly |
2021
| La Lune | Cabaletta | Oriental Mystique |

2020-2011
2020
Manuela De Vega | Fanny Logan | Vivionn
2019
Klassique | True Self | Pilaster
2018
God Given | Crimson Rosette | What A Home
2017
Bateel | Dubka | Ajman Princess
2016
Journey | Sweeping Up | Miss Marjurie
2015
Miss Marjurie | Wonderstruck | Lady Tiana
2014
Sultanina | Freedom's Light | Silk Sari
2013
Moment In Time | Nymphea | Ambivalent
2012
Shimmering Surf | Set To Music | Molly Malone
2011
Ferdoos | Vita Nova | Meeznah

2010-2003
2010
Les Fazzani | Polly's Mark | Rosika
2009
Suzi's Decision | Les Fazzani | Cassique Lady
2008
Folk Opera | Under The Rainbow | Miramare
2007
Trick Or Treat | Wannabe Posh | Green Room
2006
Arbella | Aunt Julia | Intrigued
2005
Autumn Wealth | Tartouche | Astrocharm
2004
Pongee | Desert Royalty | Chantress
2003
Albanova | Prompt Payment | Persian Lass

The Lester Piggott Stakes is a Group 3 flat horse race in Great Britain open to fillies and mares aged four years or older. It is run at Haydock Park over a distance of 1 mile, 3 furlongs and 175 yards (2,373 metres), and it is scheduled to take place each year in late May or early June.

== History ==
The event was established in 2003, and it was initially classed at Listed level. The inaugural running was won by Albanova.

For several years the Pinnacle Stakes was run in memory of Lady Joan Westbrook, a successful owner and breeder of racehorses, who died in 2004.

The race was promoted to Group 3 status in 2012.

It was renamed from the Pinnacle Stakes to the Lester Piggott Stakes for the 2024 season.

== Records ==
Most successful horse (2 wins):

- Estrange - 2025, 2026

Leading jockey (3 wins):

- Daniel Tudhope - Klassique (2019), Estrange (2025, 2026)

Leading trainer (3 wins):

- John Gosden - Sultanina (2014), Journey (2016), Queen Of The Pride (2024)

== Winners ==
| Year | Winner | Age | Jockey | Trainer | Time |
|---|---|---|---|---|---|
| 2003 | Albanova | 4 | George Duffield | Sir Mark Prescott | 2:43.01 |
| 2004 | Pongee | 4 | Ted Durcan | Luca Cumani | 2:32.16 |
| 2005 | Autumn Wealth | 4 | Shane Kelly | Amanda Perrett | 2:32.60 |
| 2006 | Arbella | 4 | Jamie Spencer | Walter Swinburn | 2:37.86 |
| 2007 | Trick or Treat | 4 | Jamie Mackay | James Given | 2:30.77 |
| 2008 | Folk Opera | 4 | Frankie Dettori | Saeed bin Suroor | 2:30.42 |
| 2009 | Suzi's Decision | 4 | Pat Smullen | Paul D'Arcy | 2:32.57 |
| 2010 | Les Fazzani | 6 | Paul Hanagan | Kevin Ryan | 2:36.99 |
| 2011 | Ferdoos | 4 | Neil Callan | Roger Varian | 2:32.20 |
| 2012 | Shimmering Surf | 5 | Neil Callan | Roger Varian | 2:31.91 |
| 2013 | Moment in Time | 4 | Jim Crowley | David Simcock | 2:30.87 |
| 2014 | Sultanina | 4 | William Buick | John Gosden | 2:34.39 |
| 2015 | Miss Marjurie | 5 | Paul Hanagan | Denis Coakley | 2:33.34 |
| 2016 | Journey | 4 | Frankie Dettori | John Gosden | 2:32.47 |
| 2017 | Bateel | 5 | Richard Kingscote | Francis-Henri Graffard | 2:36.91 |
| 2018 | God Given | 4 | Jamie Spencer | Luca Cumani | 2:31.75 |
| 2019 | Klassique | 4 | Daniel Tudhope | William Haggas | 2:26.02 |
| 2020 | Manuela de Vega | 4 | Rob Hornby | Ralph Beckett | 2:28.15 |
| 2021 | La Lune | 5 | David Probert | Henry Candy | 2:40.51 |
| 2022 | Sea La Rosa | 4 | Tom Marquand | William Haggas | 2:36.71 |
| 2023 | Sea Silk Road | 4 | Tom Marquand | William Haggas | 2:29.88 |
| 2024 | Queen Of The Pride | 4 | Oisin Murphy | John & Thady Gosden | 2:34.65 |
| 2025 | Estrange | 4 | Daniel Tudhope | David O'Meara | 2:31.55 |
| 2026 | Estrange | 5 | Daniel Tudhope | David O'Meara | 2:22.58 |

== See also ==
- Horse racing in Great Britain
- List of British flat horse races
