= Normandie Stud =

British racehorse breeding operation

- Company type: Thoroughbred Racing Stable, Stud farm
- Website: http://www.normandiestud.co.uk

Normandie Stud was a successful British breeder of thoroughbred racehorses owned by Philippa Cooper. They bred Group 1 winners Fallen For You, Duncan and Sultanina.
