= Was (horse) =

Irish-bred Thoroughbred racehorse

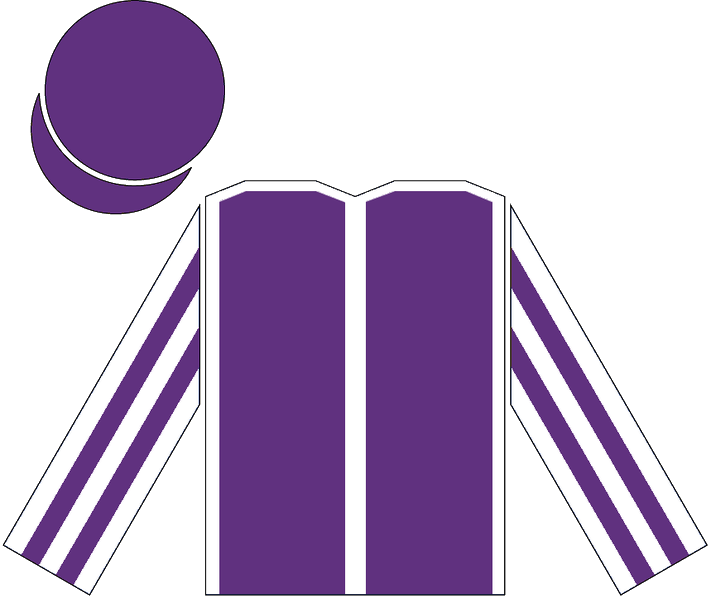
- Racing silks of Derrick Smith
- Sire: Galileo
- Grandsire: Sadler's Wells
- Dam: Alluring Park
- Damsire: Green Desert
- Sex: Mare
- Foaled: 11 May 2009
- Country: Ireland
- Colour: Bay
- Breeder: Lodge Park Stud
- Owner: Derrick Smith, Mrs John Magnier, Michael Tabor
- Trainer: Aidan O'Brien
- Record: 9: 2-1-3

Major wins
- Epsom Oaks (2012)

Was is a retired Irish Thoroughbred racehorse and broodmare. She is best known for winning The Oaks on her third racecourse appearance.

== Background ==
Was is a bay broodmare with a narrow white blaze and white socks on her hind feet, bred by the Lodge Park Stud in County Kilkenny, Ireland. She was sired by the 2001 Epsom Derby winner Galileo out of the mare Alluring Park, a half-sister of the Derby winner New Approach. In October 2010, the filly was sent to the Tattersalls sales where she was bought for 1,200,000 guineas by the bloodstock agent Dermot "Demi" O'Byrne on behalf of John Magnier's Coolmore organisation. The price made her the most expensive European yearling of 2010.

== Racing career ==
=== 2011: two-year-old season ===
Was first appeared on a racecourse in a maiden race at the Curragh on 7 August. Ridden by her trainer's son Joseph O'Brien, she won by two and a half lengths from her stable companion, Cabin, and ten other fillies.

=== 2012: three-year-old season ===
Was made her three-year-old debut in the Blue Wind Stakes at Naas on 16 May. Ridden by Seamie Heffernan, she finished third of the six runners behind Princess Highway. On 1 June Was started a 20/1 outsider for the Epsom Oaks, in which O'Brien ran five fillies including Maybe who started second favourite. Was went into the lead from the start but was then settled behind the leaders by Heffernan. She regained the lead two furlongs from the finish and ran on under pressure to win by a neck from Shirocco Star. The filly was expected to run in the Pretty Polly Stakes on 1 July, but was withdrawn (along with Maybe) because of the extremely soft ground. In the Irish Oaks three weeks later, Was appeared to be badly hampered in the straight before finishing fourth, beaten more than five lengths by Great Heavens. In August, Was was brought back in distance for the ten furlong Nassau Stakes at Goodwood, and finished third behind The Fugue and Timepiece. Later that month she finished third to Shareta and The Fugue in the Yorkshire Oaks. On her final appearance of the year she finished unplaced behind Sapphire in the British Champions Fillies' and Mares' Stakes.

=== 2013: four-year-old season ===
Was began her third season in the Abu Dhabi Stakes over one mile at the Curragh on 25 May. Ridden by Joseph O'Brien she started at odds of 11/2 and finished fourth of the eight runners behind Chigun. On 30 June Was started 5/2 favourite for the Pretty Polly Stakes and finished second, half a length behind the winner Ambivalent and a neck ahead of Shirocco Star.

== Breeding career ==
Was retired from racing in 2014 and was bred to War Front, to whom she produced the filly Darkness Falls in January 2015 and the colts Globe Theatre (2016) and Knight of Malta (2017).

== Pedigree ==
Pedigree of Was (IRE), bay filly, 2009
Sire Galileo (IRE) 1998	Sadler's Wells; 1981	Northern Dancer	Nearctic
Sire Galileo (IRE) 1998	Sadler's Wells; 1981	Northern Dancer	Natalma
Sire Galileo (IRE) 1998	Sadler's Wells; 1981	Fairy Bridge	Bold Reason
Sire Galileo (IRE) 1998	Sadler's Wells; 1981	Fairy Bridge	Special
Sire Galileo (IRE) 1998	Urban Sea; 1989	Miswaki	Mr. Prospector
Sire Galileo (IRE) 1998	Urban Sea; 1989	Miswaki	Hopespringseternal
Sire Galileo (IRE) 1998	Urban Sea; 1989	Allegretta	Lombard
Sire Galileo (IRE) 1998	Urban Sea; 1989	Allegretta	Anatevka
Dam Alluring Park (IRE) 2002	Green Desert; 1983	Danzig	Northern Dancer
Dam Alluring Park (IRE) 2002	Green Desert; 1983	Danzig	Pas de Nom
Dam Alluring Park (IRE) 2002	Green Desert; 1983	Foreign Courier	Sir Ivor
Dam Alluring Park (IRE) 2002	Green Desert; 1983	Foreign Courier	Courtly Dee
Dam Alluring Park (IRE) 2002	Park Express; 1983	Ahonoora	Lorenzaccio
Dam Alluring Park (IRE) 2002	Park Express; 1983	Ahonoora	Helen Nichols
Dam Alluring Park (IRE) 2002	Park Express; 1983	Matcher	Match
Dam Alluring Park (IRE) 2002	Park Express; 1983	Matcher	Lachine (Family:19-b)
