= Talent (horse) =

British-bred Thoroughbred racehorse

- Racing silks of James Rowsell
- Sire: New Approach
- Grandsire: Galileo
- Dam: Prowess
- Damsire: Peintre Celebre
- Sex: Filly
- Foaled: 25 February 2010
- Country: Ireland
- Colour: Chestnut
- Breeder: Ashbrittle Stud & M H Dixon
- Owner: James Rowsell & Mark Dixon
- Trainer: Ralph Beckett-
- Record: 11: 3-1-3
- Earnings: £489,197

Major wins
- Pretty Polly Stakes (2013); Investec Oaks (2013)

Talent (foaled 25 February 2010) is a British Thoroughbred racehorse, best known for winning the classic Oaks Stakes in 2013.

== Background ==
Talent is a chestnut with a white blaze and long white socks on her hind legs, bred by the Ashbrittle Stud near Wellington in Somerset. Talent is from the first crop of foal sired by New Approach a horse which won four Group One races including The Derby, and was the equal highest-rated Thoroughbred in the world when trained by Jim Bolger in 2008. Other products of New Approach's first crop included Dawn Approach and the Dante Stakes winner Libertarian. Her dam, Prowess, won one minor race and was a granddaughter of the Oaks winner Bireme, herself owned and bred by Mark Dixon's uncle R.D (Dick) Hollingsworth.

Talent is owned in partnership by the Ashbrittle Stud's owner James Rowsell and Mark Dixon. The filly was sent into training with Ralph Beckett at Kimpton near Andover in Hampshire. Beckett has described the filly as "very robust and hardy and she shows she's tough in everything she does".

== Racing career ==
=== 2012: two-year-old season ===
Talent began her racing career on 18 August 2012 in a six furlong maiden race for two-year-old fillies at Newbury. She started at odds of 14/1 and finished third of the ten runners, four lengths behind the winner Malilla. At Kempton on 7 September, Talent started the 6/4 favourite for a seven furlong race on the polytrack surface and won by a neck from Hanzada despite hanging to the left in the closing stages. In this race she was ridden by Beckett's stable jockey Jim Crowley.

=== 2013: three-year-old season ===
On her three-year-old debut, Talent contested the Pretty Polly Stakes over ten furlongs at Newmarket on 5 May. Ridden by Crowley, she started at odds of 11/1 against seven opponents and won by half a length from Lady Nouf. On 31 May, Talent was one of eleven fillies to contest the 235th running of the Oaks Stakes over 1 1/2 miles at Epsom Downs Racecourse. Her stable companion Secret Gesture started second favourite and was selected by Crowley, whilst Talent started at odds of 20/1 and was ridden by Richard Hughes. Talent, who was drawn in stall 3, raced towards the back of the field and turned into the straight in ninth place. Hughes struggled to obtain a clear run in the straight before producing the filly with a strong run on the outside. Talent overtook Secret Gesture inside the final furlong and quickly drew clear to win by three and three quarter lengths. Hughes, who was winning his second successive classic following the win of Sky Lantern in the 1000 Guineas explained that he had planned to make the running on Talent, but changed his tactics just before the start, when he realised that several other jockeys had the same idea.

On 21 July Talent started the 11/4 second favourite for the Irish Oaks at the Curragh. Ridden by Crowley, she was never in contention and finished last of the seven runners behind the French-trained Chicquita.

On 14 September, Talent was matched against ten three-year-old colts in the 237th running of the St Leger over 14 1/2 furlongs at Doncaster Racecourse. Starting at odds of 9/1, she was restrained by Crowley at the back of the field before moving forward early in the straight. She struggled to obtain a clear run and was hampered a furlong from the finish before finishing strongly to take second place, one and a quarter lengths behind the winner Leading Light. On her final appearance of the season, Talent ran in the British Champions Fillies' and Mares' Stakes for which she started the 7/2 co-favourite alongside Hot Snap and Dalkala. She stayed on in the straight to finish third behind Seal of Approval and Belle de Crecy.

=== 2014: four-year-old season ===
Talent remained in training as a four-year-old but failed to win in four starts. On her seasonal debut she returned to the scene of her Oaks victory for the Group One Coronation Cup but never looked likely to win and finished fifth behind Cirrus des Aigles. She was then dropped in class and finished third in the Lancashire Oaks at Haydock Park and fourth in the Lillie Langtry Stakes at Goodwood Racecourse in July. In August she was moved back up to Group One class for the Yorkshire Oaks and finished fifth to Tapestry, eighteen lengths behind the winner. Six days later Beckett announced that the filly would be retired from racing and return to the Ashbrittle Stud to become a broodmare, saying "She gave us the best day of our training career when winning the Oaks last year... but it became obvious that she is not the same filly this year and so it became clear that the best thing to do was to retire her... We will miss her, but with luck we can look forward to training her progeny".

== Breeding career ==
Talent was retired in 2015 to the Ashbrittle Stud.

- Ambition (2016), chestnut filly sired by Dubawi. Three wins including the Group 3 Prix Fille de l'Air.
- Dash to Fame (2017), bay colt sired by Dansili. Unraced.
- Pretty Fair (2018), chestnut filly sired by Dubawi. Unraced.
- Unnamed (2019) bay colt by Sea the Stars

== Pedigree ==
Pedigree of Talent (GB), chestnut filly, 2010
Sire New Approach (IRE) 2005	Galileo (IRE); 1998	Sadler's Wells	Northern Dancer
Sire New Approach (IRE) 2005	Galileo (IRE); 1998	Sadler's Wells	Fairy Bridge
Sire New Approach (IRE) 2005	Galileo (IRE); 1998	Urban Sea	Miswaki
Sire New Approach (IRE) 2005	Galileo (IRE); 1998	Urban Sea	Allegretta
Sire New Approach (IRE) 2005	Park Express (IRE); 1983	Ahonoora	Lorenzaccio
Sire New Approach (IRE) 2005	Park Express (IRE); 1983	Ahonoora	Helen Nichols
Sire New Approach (IRE) 2005	Park Express (IRE); 1983	Matcher	Match
Sire New Approach (IRE) 2005	Park Express (IRE); 1983	Matcher	Lachine
Dam Prowess (IRE) 2003	Peintre Celebre (USA); 1994	Nureyev	Northern Dancer
Dam Prowess (IRE) 2003	Peintre Celebre (USA); 1994	Nureyev	Special
Dam Prowess (IRE) 2003	Peintre Celebre (USA); 1994	Peinture Bleue	Alydar
Dam Prowess (IRE) 2003	Peintre Celebre (USA); 1994	Peinture Bleue	Petroleuse
Dam Prowess (IRE) 2003	Yawl (GB); 1990	Rainbow Quest	Blushing Groom
Dam Prowess (IRE) 2003	Yawl (GB); 1990	Rainbow Quest	I Will Follow
Dam Prowess (IRE) 2003	Yawl (GB); 1990	Bireme	Grundy
Dam Prowess (IRE) 2003	Yawl (GB); 1990	Bireme	Ripeck (Family: 11-d)
