= New Approach =

Irish-bred Thoroughbred racehorse

- Racing colours of Princess Haya of Jordan
- Sire: Galileo
- Grandsire: Sadler's Wells
- Dam: Park Express
- Damsire: Ahonoora
- Sex: Stallion
- Foaled: 2005
- Country: Ireland
- Colour: Chestnut
- Breeder: Lodge Park Stud
- Owner: Princess Haya of Jordan
- Trainer: Jim Bolger
- Record: 11: 8-2-1
- Earnings: £1,992,068; US$3,900,467; Currencies converted using Horseracing Authority exchange rates

Major wins
- Tyros Stakes (2007); Futurity Stakes (2007); National Stakes (2007); Dewhurst Stakes (2007); Epsom Derby (2008); Irish Champion Stakes (2008); Champion Stakes (2008)

Awards
- European Champion 2-Y-O Colt (2007); European Champion 3-Y-O Colt (2008); 1st in World Thoroughbred Rankings (2008); Irish Horse of the Year (2008)
- Last updated on 18 November 2008

New Approach (foaled 18 February 2005) is a retired Irish Thoroughbred racehorse and active stallion. In a racing career which lasted from July 2007 to October 2008 he ran eleven times and won eight races. He was undefeated in five races as a two-year-old in 2007 including the National Stakes and the Dewhurst Stakes. As a three-year-old he won the Epsom Derby, Irish Champion Stakes and Champion Stakes and was rated the best racehorse in the world (jointly with Curlin) in the 2008 World Thoroughbred Racehorse Rankings. As a breeding stallion, New Approach has sired the classic winners Masar, Dawn Approach and Talent.

== Background ==
New Approach, a chestnut colt with a white star and snip was bred by the Lodge Park Stud in County Kilkenny, Ireland from the second crop of the 2002 Derby winner Galileo. His dam was the Irish Champion Stakes winner Park Express, making him a half-brother to the Takamatsunomiya Kinen winner Shinko Forest Dazzling Park (by Warning), Champion three-year-old filly in Europe and Alluring Park, the dam of The Oaks winner Was. He was first owned by Mrs J S Bolger & John Corcoran. He was bought in training by Sheikh Mohammed, who presented the colt to his wife Princess Haya of Jordan. He was trained throughout his career by Jim Bolger and ridden in all his starts by Kevin Manning.

== Racing career ==
=== 2007: two-year-old season ===
New Approach was unbeaten in five starts as a two-year-old. He made his debut in a maiden race at The Curragh in July, winning by two lengths in what would be his only race outside group class. Two weeks later he started evens favourite for the Group III Tyros Stakes at Leopardstown and led from the start to win "easily". In August he returned to the Curragh to win the Group II Futurity Stakes at odds of 8-11 from Curtain Call, with Henrythenavigator in third, again leading from the start. In September he was moved up to Group I level for the first time in the National Stakes. He made all the running and moved clear in the closing stages to win "comfortably", defeating the future Prix Jean-Luc Lagardère winner Rio de la Plata in a race which brought together the top three horses in the ante-post betting for the 2008 2,000 Guineas.

On his final start he travelled outside Ireland for the first time for the Dewhurst Stakes at Newmarket. He was already beginning to show signs of a headstrong temperament, and had to "ponied" down to the start. In the race, he was held up for the first time, took the lead a furlong out, and, after being put under pressure for the first time in his career, prevailed by half a length from Fast Company, with future Breeders' Cup Classic winner Raven's Pass in third and Rio de la Plata in fourth.

=== 2008: three-year-old season ===
==== Spring ====
On his 2008 debut, New Approach went to the 2,000 Guineas Stakes without a prep race. In the build-up to the race, Bolger had announced that the colt was most unlikely to run in The Derby, with the Irish Derby being the preferred option In the Guineas, New Approach went off the 11-8 favourite and led as usual, but was caught inside the final furlong and beaten a nose by Henrythenavigator. Three weeks later, in the Irish 2,000 Guineas Henrythenavigator again defeated New Approach, this time by one and three-quarter lengths, with the Bolger colt hanging in the closing stages and apparently unsuited by the fast ground.

==== Summer ====
New Approach was expected to run next in the Irish Derby, but on 2 June Jim Bolger announced an abrupt change of plan. Despite having been left in The Derby entries by mistake, New Approach would in fact take his chance in the English race. The decision aroused some hostility in the British press, who claimed that those who had already placed bets on the race had been misled. Sent off the 5-1 second favourite, New Approach pulled hard in the early stages as Manning struggled to settle him. Halfway down the straight he seemed to be boxed in and unable to challenge, but a gap appeared on the rail, and he was driven to take the lead a furlong out, staying on to beat Tartan Bearer by half a length. Although the winner's performance was praised, his reception was "muted" and Jim Bolger defended the late change of plan in a "heated" post-race press conference.

A foot injury ruled New Approach out of the Irish Derby, and he was then aimed at the International Stakes at York in August. The race also attracted the leading older horse Duke of Marmalade who had won the King George VI and Queen Elizabeth Stakes at Ascot, and the meeting of the two champions was much anticipated by the press as a "clash of the titans". Bad ground conditions forced the race to be abandoned, and it was rescheduled for Newmarket four days later. New Approach again failed to settle, and pulled hard in the early stages, but this time he could only finish third behind Duke of Marmalade and Phoenix Tower.

==== Autumn ====
Two weeks later New Approach appeared in the Irish Champion Stakes, a race for which Duke of Marmalade, was a late withdrawal. As usual, he pulled hard from the start, but Kevin Manning was able to settle him, and, after taking the lead early in the straight, he kept on well to win at odds of 8-13. The form of the race was not particularly strong, with the half-length runner-up Traffic Guard having an official rating of only 110, but New Approach's connections were satisfied, with Manning commenting "he had bundles in the tank".

New Approach's final start came in the Champion Stakes at Newmarket on 18 October, for which he was sent off 6-5 favourite against ten opponents. In a performance described in The Observer as "scintillating", he took the lead three furlongs out and pulled away from the field to win by six lengths from Twice Over in race record time.

== Assessment and honours ==
At the end of his 2007 season New Approach was the highest rated two-year-old colt in Europe and won the Cartier Racing Award for Champion Two-Year Old. A year later was given a rating of 130 in the 2008 World Thoroughbred Racehorse Rankings, making the equal top-ranked racehorse in the world. He was also named Champion Three-Year-Old colt in the Cartier Awards. New Approach was voted 2008 Irish Horse of the Year in a poll conducted by Horse Racing Ireland, beating Duke of Marmalade, Henrythenavigator and Yeats.

== Stud record ==
New Approach stands as a stallion for the Darley Stud. He spends the first part of the year at the Dalham Stall Stud at Newmarket, and is "shuttled" to the Northwood Park Stud Farm in Victoria for the Southern Hemisphere breeding season.

=== Notable stock ===
Group 1 winners:

c = colt, f = filly, g = gelding

Foaled	Name	Sex	Major Wins
2010	Dawn Approach	c	Vincent O'Brien Stakes, Dewhurst Stakes, 2000 Guineas
2010	May's Dream	f	Australasian Oaks
2010	Sultanina	f	Nassau Stakes
2010	Talent	f	Epsom Oaks
2011	Elliptique	c	Bayerisches Zuchtrennen
2011	Potemkin	c	Premio Roma
2015	Cascadian	c	Doncaster Mile, All Aged Stakes, Australian Cup (twice)
2015	Masar	c	Epsom Derby
2018	Mac Swiney	c	Vertem Futurity Trophy, Irish 2,000 Guineas

== Pedigree ==
Pedigree of New Approach (IRE), chestnut stallion, 2005
Sire Galileo (IRE) 1998	Sadler's Wells; 1981	Northern Dancer	Nearctic
Sire Galileo (IRE) 1998	Sadler's Wells; 1981	Northern Dancer	Natalma
Sire Galileo (IRE) 1998	Sadler's Wells; 1981	Fairy Bridge	Bold Reason
Sire Galileo (IRE) 1998	Sadler's Wells; 1981	Fairy Bridge	Special
Sire Galileo (IRE) 1998	Urban Sea; 1989	Miswaki	Mr. Prospector
Sire Galileo (IRE) 1998	Urban Sea; 1989	Miswaki	Hopespringeternal
Sire Galileo (IRE) 1998	Urban Sea; 1989	Allegretta	Lombard
Sire Galileo (IRE) 1998	Urban Sea; 1989	Allegretta	Anatevka
Dam Park Express (IRE) 1983	Ahonoora; 1975	Lorenzaccio	Klairon
Dam Park Express (IRE) 1983	Ahonoora; 1975	Lorenzaccio	Phoenissa
Dam Park Express (IRE) 1983	Ahonoora; 1975	Helen Nichols	Martial
Dam Park Express (IRE) 1983	Ahonoora; 1975	Helen Nichols	Quaker Girl
Dam Park Express (IRE) 1983	Matcher; 1966	Match	Tantieme
Dam Park Express (IRE) 1983	Matcher; 1966	Match	Relance
Dam Park Express (IRE) 1983	Matcher; 1966	Lachine	Grey Sovereign
Dam Park Express (IRE) 1983	Matcher; 1966	Lachine	Loved One (Family: 19-b)
