= Journey (horse) =

American-bred Thoroughbred racehorse

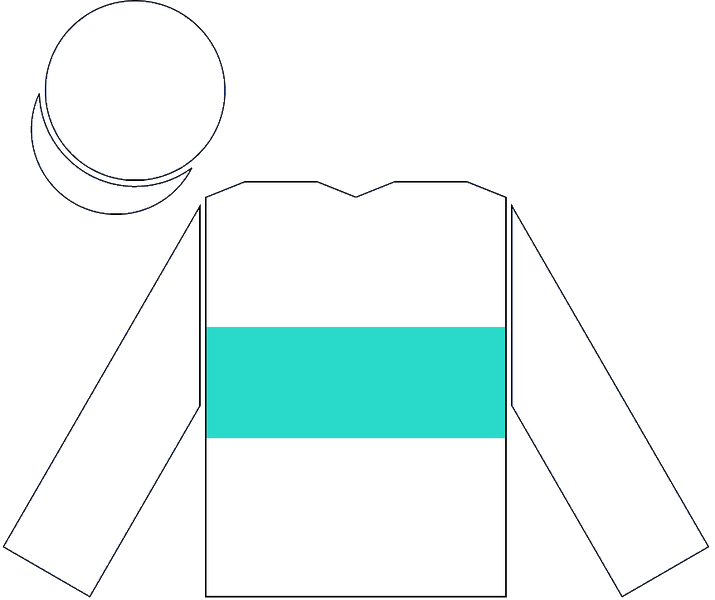
- Racing silks of George Strawbridge
- Sire: Dubawi
- Grandsire: Dubai Millennium
- Dam: Montare
- Damsire: Montjeu
- Sex: Mare
- Foaled: 16 March 2012
- Country: Great Britain
- Colour: Bay
- Breeder: Augustin Stable
- Owner: George W. Strawbridge, Jr.
- Trainer: John Gosden
- Record: 17:6
- Earnings: £622,752 €70,000

Major wins
- Princess Royal Stakes (2015, 2016); Pinnacle Stakes (2016); British Champions Fillies' and Mares' Stakes (2016)

Journey (foaled 16 March 2012) is a retired Thoroughbred racehorse best known for winning the British Champions Fillies' and Mares' Stakes at Ascot on British Champions Day. It has been suggested she was named in reference to the band Journey.

== Background ==
Journey was bred in by her owner George W. Strawbridge, Jr. and was sent to race in Europe where she was trained by John Gosden. She was ridden in most of her races by Frankie Dettori.

== Racing career ==
In 2016 as a four-year-old, Journey won the Pinnacle Stakes and then won the British Champions Fillies' and Mares' Stakes with Dettori as her jockey.

Journey, with jockey Dettori, raced again in the 2017 British Champions Filles' and Mares' Stakes on 21 October 2017. She started the race well but faded away towards the end finishing 6th. She was retired after the race.

== Pedigree ==
Pedigree of Journey (GB), bay mare, 2012
Sire Dubawi (IRE) 2002	Dubai Millennium (GB); 1996	Seeking The Gold (USA)	Mr. Prospector (USA)
Sire Dubawi (IRE) 2002	Dubai Millennium (GB); 1996	Seeking The Gold (USA)	Con Game (USA)
Sire Dubawi (IRE) 2002	Dubai Millennium (GB); 1996	Colorado Dancer (IRE)	Shareef Dancer (USA)
Sire Dubawi (IRE) 2002	Dubai Millennium (GB); 1996	Colorado Dancer (IRE)	Fall Aspen (USA)
Sire Dubawi (IRE) 2002	Zomaradah (GB); 1995	Deploy (GB)	Shirley Heights (GB)
Sire Dubawi (IRE) 2002	Zomaradah (GB); 1995	Deploy (GB)	Slightly Dangerous (USA)
Sire Dubawi (IRE) 2002	Zomaradah (GB); 1995	Jawaher (IRE)	Dancing Brave (USA)
Sire Dubawi (IRE) 2002	Zomaradah (GB); 1995	Jawaher (IRE)	High Tern (IRE)
Dam Montare (IRE) 2002	Montjeu (IRE); 1996	Sandlers Wells (USA)	Northern Dancer (CAN)
Dam Montare (IRE) 2002	Montjeu (IRE); 1996	Sandlers Wells (USA)	Fairy Bridge (USA)
Dam Montare (IRE) 2002	Montjeu (IRE); 1996	Floripedes (FRA)	Top Ville (IRE)
Dam Montare (IRE) 2002	Montjeu (IRE); 1996	Floripedes (FRA)	Toute Cy (FRA)
Dam Montare (IRE) 2002	Contare (GB); 1993	Shirley Heights (GB)	Mill Reef (USA)
Dam Montare (IRE) 2002	Contare (GB); 1993	Shirley Heights (GB)	Hardiemma (GB)
Dam Montare (IRE) 2002	Contare (GB); 1993	Balenare (GB)	Pharly (FRA)
Dam Montare (IRE) 2002	Contare (GB); 1993	Balenare (GB)	Flashy (GB)
