= Park Express =

Irish-bred Thoroughbred racehorse

- Sire: Ahonoora
- Grandsire: Lorenzaccio
- Dam: Matcher
- Damsire: Match
- Sex: Mare
- Foaled: 25 March 1983
- Country: Ireland
- Colour: Brown
- Breeder: Peter Clarke
- Owner: Patrick H Burns
- Trainer: Jim Bolger
- Record: 14: 5-3-2

Major wins
- Lancashire Oaks (1986); Nassau Stakes (1986); Phoenix Champion Stakes (1986)

Awards
- Top-rated Irish three-year-old (1987); Top rated European three-year-old filly, 9½ furlongs plus (1987); Timeform rating: 111 (1987), 123 (1986); Irish Broodmare of the Year

Honours
- Park Express Stakes at the Curragh

Park Express (25 March 1983 – 2006) was an Irish Thoroughbred racehorse and broodmare. She showed promise as a two-year-old in 1985, before developing into a top-class middle-distance performer in the following season. Racing against horses of her own age and sex she won the Lancashire Oaks and Nassau Stakes before recording her biggest success against colts and older horses in the Phoenix Champion Stakes. She retired from racing with a record of five wins and five places from fourteen races. She later became an extremely successful broodmare, producing several good winners. Most importantly, she was the dam of The Derby winner New Approach, a colt foaled at a time when Park Express was completely blind. She died in 2006 at the age of 23.

== Background ==
Park Express was a "big, rangy", dark brown mare bred in Ireland by Peter Clarke. She was sired by Ahonoora, whose other offspring included The Derby winner Dr Devious. Ahonoora was a representative of the Byerley Turk sire line, unlike more than 95% of modern thoroughbreds, who descend directly from the Darley Arabian. Park Express's dam Matcher was bred in Canada by E. P. Taylor and produced several other winners including Myra's Best (Firth of Clyde Stakes) and the successful hurdler Wing and a Prayer.

The filly was sent to the sales as a foal and sold for 17,000 Irish guineas. In the following year she was sold again for 42,000 guineas, this time to John Warren, acting on behalf of the father and son team of Paddy and Seamus Burns of the Lodge Park Stud. She was sent into training with Jim Bolger at Coolcullen in County Carlow. Park Express usually raced in a sheepskin noseband.

== Racing career ==
=== 1985: two-year-old season ===
Park Express began her racing career at Leopardstown Racecourse in September 1985, when she won a six furlong maiden race by five lengths. She was then moved up abruptly in class when she was sent to England for the Group One Cheveley Park Stakes over six furlongs at Newmarket Racecourse. She finished fifth of the fourteen runners, three lengths behind the winner Embla. In late October she started odds-on favourite for the Leopardstown Stakes, but was beaten a head by the colt Toca Madera.

=== 1986: three-year-old season ===
Park Express began her three-year-old season by winning a minor race at Leopardstown, but when moved up in class she finished tenth behind Sonic Lady in the Irish 1000 Guineas. She was then moved up in distance and finished fourth behind Gull Nook in the Ribblesdale Stakes over one and a half miles at Royal Ascot. John Reid took over as Parke Express's rider for the Lancashire Oaks at Haydock Park Racecourse and adopted new tactics, riding her much closer to the lead than at Ascot. She showed much improved form to record her first Group race success, winning by one and a half lengths from Mill on the Floss, who had finished ahead of her in the Ribblesdale. On 2 August Park Express returned to England for the Group Two Nassau Stakes at Goodwood Racecourse where she was opposed by Maysoon, a filly who had been placed in both the 1000 Guineas and the Oaks Stakes. Park Express started third favourite at odds of 7/1 and won by three lengths from Maysoon and Asteroid Field. Later that month in the Group One Yorkshire Oaks she started third choice in the betting behind Colorspin (the winner of the Irish Oaks) and Gull Nook. She took the lead in the straight and rallied after being overtaken to finish second, three quarters of a length by Untold.

Park Express then contested the third running of Ireland's most valuable weight-for-age race, the Phoenix Champion Stakes at Phoenix Park Racecourse on 7 September. She started 11/2 third favourite in a race which attracted a strong French challenge headed by the Group One winning four-year-olds Triptych and Baillamont (winner of the Prix Jean Prat, Prix Ganay and Prix d'Ispahan). Park Express took the lead two furlongs from the finish and won decisively by two and a half lengths from Double Bed, with Triptych another two and a half lengths back in third. Reid commented: "She really won her race easily. There was never a moment's concern."

Later that month, Park Express started the odds-on favourite for the Blandford Stakes at the Curragh, but was beaten half a length by the four-year-old colt Nemain. In October she started favourite for the Champion Stakes at Newmarket, where she finished third behind Triptych and Celestial Storm. She was then sent to the United States to run in the Breeders' Cup Distaff at Santa Anita Park. She worked promisingly on the dirt course after being prepared for the surface in Ireland by being galloped on sawdust, but was withdrawn after contracting colic shortly before the race and was subsequently retired.

== Assessment ==
In 1985, the independent Timeform organisation gave Park Express a rating of 111, thirteen pounds below the top-rated two-year-old filly Femme Elite. In the official International Classification for two-year-olds, she was given a rating of 72, eight pounds behind the top-rated filly Baiser Vole. In the following year she was given a rating of 123 by both Timeform and the International Classification. She was the highest-rated three-year-old of either sex trained in Ireland and the highest-rated filly of her generation in Europe over ten furlongs.

== Stud record ==
Park Express was retired from racing to become a broodmare at her owner's Lodge Park Stud in County Kilkenny. She proved to be very successful, producing at least eleven foals and being the ancestor of many good winners:

- Lady Express (chestnut filly, foaled 1990, sired by Soviet Star)
- Park Heiress (bay filly, foaled 1991, sired by Sadler's Wells)
- Shinko Forest (brown colt, foaled 1993, sired by Green Desert), won Grade I Takamatsunomiya Kinen
- Green Seraphim (chestnut filly, foaled 1995, sired by Caerleon)
- Dazzling Park (brown filly, foaled 1996, sired by Warning), won three races including the Matron Stakes.
- Innocent Affair (filly, foaled 1997, sired by Night Shift)
- Alluring Park (brown filly, foaled 1999, sired by Green Desert), won one race, dam of The Oaks winner Was, and the filly Al Naamah who was sold for 5m guineas as a yearling in 2013.
- Tycoon King (brown colt, foaled 2000, sired by Last Tycoon), won two races
- Thunder Rock (bay colt, foaled 2002, sired by King's Best), won five races
- Sir Arthur (colt, foaled 2003, sired by Desert Prince), won two races
- New Approach (chestnut colt, foaled 2005, sired by Galileo), Park Express's last foal, won eight races including the National Stakes, Dewhurst Stakes, Epsom Derby, Irish Champion Stakes, Champion Stakes.

Her later achievements as a broodmare were more remarkable as she began to lose her sight at the age of sixteen. Her last foal, New Approach, wore a bell to enable his mother to find him at the farm where he was raised. Towards the end of her life her companion was one of the farm's bullocks, to which she had become strongly attached. Park Express died in 2006 at the age of twenty-three.

== Pedigree ==
Pedigree of Park Express (IRE), brown mare, 1983
Sire Ahonoora (GB) 1975	Lorenzaccio (GB); 1965	Klairon	Clarion
Sire Ahonoora (GB) 1975	Lorenzaccio (GB); 1965	Klairon	Kalmia
Sire Ahonoora (GB) 1975	Lorenzaccio (GB); 1965	Phoenissa	The Phoenix
Sire Ahonoora (GB) 1975	Lorenzaccio (GB); 1965	Phoenissa	Erica Fragrans
Sire Ahonoora (GB) 1975	Helen Nichols (GB); 1966	Martial	Hill Gail
Sire Ahonoora (GB) 1975	Helen Nichols (GB); 1966	Martial	Discipliner
Sire Ahonoora (GB) 1975	Helen Nichols (GB); 1966	Quaker Girl	Whistler
Sire Ahonoora (GB) 1975	Helen Nichols (GB); 1966	Quaker Girl	Mayflower
Dam Matcher (CAN) 1966	Match (FR); 1958	Tantieme	Deux-Pour-Cent
Dam Matcher (CAN) 1966	Match (FR); 1958	Tantieme	Terka
Dam Matcher (CAN) 1966	Match (FR); 1958	Relance	Relic
Dam Matcher (CAN) 1966	Match (FR); 1958	Relance	Polaire
Dam Matcher (CAN) 1966	Lachine (GB); 1960	Grey Sovereign	Nasrullah
Dam Matcher (CAN) 1966	Lachine (GB); 1960	Grey Sovereign	Kong
Dam Matcher (CAN) 1966	Lachine (GB); 1960	Loved One	Vigorous
Dam Matcher (CAN) 1966	Lachine (GB); 1960	Loved One	Sama (Family: 19-b)
