= William Buick =

Norwegian-born flat jockey

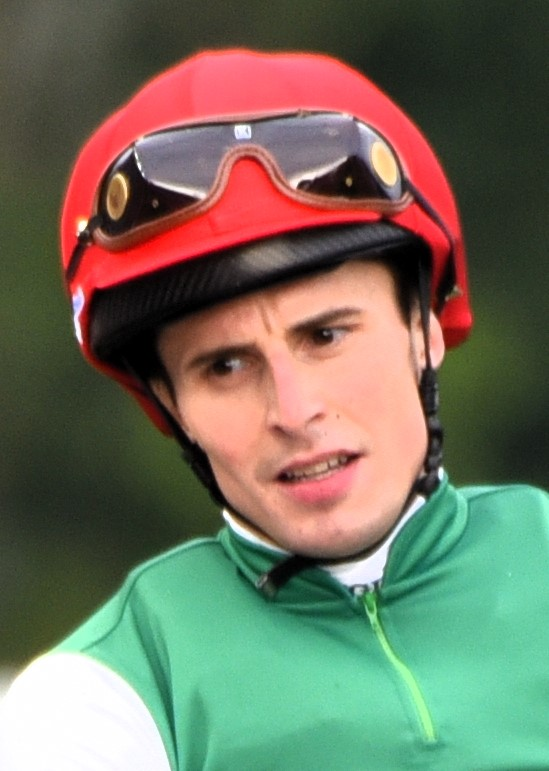
- Buick pariticipating the Hong Kong Mile on 10 December 2023

Personal information
- Born: 22 July 1988 (age 38) Oslo, Norway
- Occupation: Jockey
- Weight: 8 st 8 lb (120 lb; 54 kg)

Horse racing career
- Sport: Horse racing

Major racing wins
- British Classic Races: St Leger Stakes (2010, 2011, 2021); Derby Stakes (2018); 2000 Guineas (2024, 2025); 1000 Guineas (2025); Other major British races: British Champions Fillies' and Mares' Stakes (2020); British Champions Sprint Stakes (2021); Cheveley Park Stakes (2015, 2022); Coronation Cup (2020); Coronation Stakes (2012); Dewhurst Stakes (2019, 2021); Eclipse Stakes (2012, 2016, 2020); Falmouth Stakes (2013); International Stakes (2020); July Cup (2024); King George VI and Queen Elizabeth Stakes (2011, 2021); King's Stand Stakes (2018); Lockinge Stakes (2017, 2023); Middle Park Stakes (2010, 2014, 2024, 2025); Nassau Stakes (2013, 2014, 2018); Nunthorpe Stakes (2012); Queen Anne Stakes (2017); Sprint Cup (2011); St. James's Palace Stakes (2022); Sun Chariot Stakes (2021); Sussex Stakes (2024); Yorkshire Oaks (2013); Major international races: Grand Prix de Paris (2021); Manhattan Stakes (2024); Poule d'Essai des Poulains (2022); Prix Jacques Le Marois (2016); Prix Jean Prat (2020); Prix Jean Romanet (2012); Prix Marcel Boussac (2011, 2016); Prix Maurice de Gheest (2020); Prix Morny (2010); Prix Rothschild (2012, 2013, 2022); Prix Saint-Alary (2017); Prix de l'Opera (2018); Prix de la Foret (2011, 2012, 2021); Bayerisches Zuchtrennen (2020, 2023); Grosser Preis von Baden (2019); Preis von Europa (2022); Irish Champion Stakes (2013); Irish Derby (2015, 2021); Irish Oaks (2012); Pretty Polly Stakes (2012); Queen Elizabeth II Cup (2018); Vincent O'Brien National Stakes (2018, 2019, 2021); Breeders' Cup Turf Mile (2023); Dubai Sheema Classic (2010, 2017, 2018, 2019, 2024); Dubai World Cup (2015); Jebel Hatta (2013, 2016, 2020, 2024)

Racing awards
- British flat racing Champion Apprentice (2008 - tied); British flat racing Champion Jockey (2022, 2023)

Significant horses
- Adayar, Arctic Cosmos, Barney Roy, Blue Point, Charming Thought, Coroebus, Creative Force, Dar Re Mi, Dream Ahead, Elusive Kate, Fallen For You, Ghaiyyath, Gordon Lord Byron, Great Heavens, Hawkbill, Hurricane Lane, Izzi Top, Jack Hobbs, Lumiere, Masar, Masked Marvel, Master of The Seas, Modern Games, Nathaniel, Nations Pride, Native Trail, Old Persian, Ortensia, Pinatubo, Prince Bishop, Quorto, Rebel's Romance, Ribchester, Saffron Beach, Sajjhaa, Sobetsu, Space Blues, Sultanina, The Fugue, Wild Illusion, Winsili, Wonderful Tonight, Wuheida
- Updated on 24 October 2023

William Buick (born 22 July 1988) is a Norwegian-born British flat jockey. He shared the champion apprentice jockey title in 2008 with David Probert and won the Lester Award for Apprentice Jockey of the Year in 2007 and 2008. From 2010 to 2014 he was stable jockey to John Gosden. In 2015 he signed with Godolphin. Buick won his first Group 1 race in Canada in 2010 and since then has won Group 1 races in England, France, Germany, Hong Kong, Ireland, Italy, Japan, the United Arab Emirates and the United States. He has won five British Classic Races: the St Leger in 2010, 2011 and 2021, the Derby in 2018 and the 2000 Guineas in 2024. He was British flat racing Champion Jockey in 2022 and 2023.

== Background ==
Buick was born in Norway in 1988, where his Scottish-born father, Walter, was Scandinavian champion jockey on eight occasions and his Danish mother, Maria, a dressage rider and showjumper. He has two younger brothers called Martin and Andrew.

Buick was riding horses from a young age and used to ride out in the mornings before going to school. He later recalled "I didn't go much (to school). I rode out most mornings and was always late. My mum wasn't too keen but my dad said that if it was what I wanted, crack on." Fluent in Norwegian, Danish, English and German, Buick was a regular visitor to the UK, where he spent summer holidays riding out for trainers Reg Hollinshead, Marcus Tregoning and Andrew Balding. After leaving school, he joined Balding as an apprentice jockey.

== Apprentice jockey ==
Buick, who was very small for his age, rode in his first race on 10 August 2006 at the age of 18, on Tiny Tim, trained by Andrew Balding, at Brighton racecourse. Before Buick's first ride, the former Classic-winning trainer Ian Balding had struck a bet with the Tote at 500–1 on Buick becoming champion jockey before the year 2020. Buick's first win came on the Paul D’Arcy trained Bank on Benny at Salisbury on 27 September 2006 and by the end of the year he had ridden ten winners, leading Ian Balding to say "without question he is the best apprentice we have ever had."

Buick was part of a duel for the 2008 apprentice title, fought between him and David Probert, who like Buick was attached to the Andrew Balding stable and had his first ride on the stable's schoolmaster Tiny Tim. While Buick had the advantage of a full season's experience (which had included a first victory at Royal Ascot on Dark Missile in the Wokingham Stakes), Probert had the advantage of a 5 lbs claim and the race for the title went all the way to the final day of the season, with both riders finishing on 50 winners.

For the second year running, Buick was named Apprentice Jockey of the Year at the British horseracing awards ceremony, the Lesters.

== Professional jockey ==
=== 2009 ===
In October 2009 Buick won his first Group 1 race, the E. P. Taylor Stakes in Woodbine, Canada, on Lahaleeb for trainer Mick Channon. In January 2010, he was offered the role of stable jockey to Newmarket-based trainer John Gosden after the trainer parted company with his previous stable jockey Jimmy Fortune.

=== 2010 ===
The partnership got off to a perfect start at the Dubai Carnival in March 2010, with Buick winning the Group 1 Dubai Sheema Classic at Meydan on Gosden's Dar Re Mi on what was his first top-level ride (and just fourth ride in total) for the trainer. After the race, Gosden commented on the appointment of Buick. "Yes, it is good to be vindicated straightaway. I like his style, I like his intelligence, I like his balance."

Buick and Gosden were to enjoy further Group 1 success together in 2010, with victory in the Arlington Million (Debussy) in August followed by St Leger victory for Arctic Cosmos at Doncaster, giving Buick a maiden Classic success and Gosden a third St Leger victory (Shantou in 1996 and Lucarno in 2007). After the win, Buick said "To be standing here is very special. To win a Classic is what every jockey wants to do and it has been my dream since I came into racing".

Buick also formed a partnership with the David Simcock-trained two-year-old Dream Ahead, winning the Group 1 Prix Morny at Deauville (giving Buick a first Group 1 success in France) and the Group 1 Middle Park Stakes at Newmarket.

The year ended badly for Buick, as he was forced to spend New Year's Eve in hospital having suffered two falls the day before at Meydan. Having initially been thought to have escaped injury as no bones were broken, he was found to have bleeding on the brain and, after a week's stay in hospital, was forced to sit on the sidelines for six weeks before returning to race-riding.

=== 2011 ===
After a successful start to his career as stable jockey to John Gosden in 2010, Buick was tipped by many to challenge for the flat jockeys championship in 2011. However, with the Horseman's Group having set prize-money tariffs specifying the minimum amount of prize-money racecourses should offer for each type of race, Gosden was one of a number of trainers to agree to a boycott of 'under-tariff' races, a stance that led Buick to comment "It's going to affect me, but I totally agree with it. Something has to be done about it and that's the only way it's going to be done, by people not running their horses." Nevertheless, Buick was able to ride a century of winners in Britain in a calendar year for the first time and, for the second year running, was successful in five Group 1 contests worldwide.

The first of these was a success on Nathaniel in the Group 1 King George VI and Queen Elizabeth Stakes at Ascot in July. Nathaniel had already given Buick the second Royal Ascot victory of his career in the Group 2 King Edward VII Stakes (quickly followed by Beachfire later that day in the Wolferton Stakes). Dream Ahead, on whom Buick had won two Group 1 races in 2011, won both the Sprint Cup at Haydock over 6f and then the Prix de la Forêt over 7f at Longchamp, in which he beat the star French mare Goldikova, providing Buick with the first Group 1 double of his career, having won the Prix Marcel Boussac earlier that day on Elusive Kate for John Gosden. Buick also won a second successive St Leger with victory on Masked Marvel

=== 2012 ===
In 2012, Buick won nine Group 1 races across the globe. One of these victories came in the Coronation Stakes at Royal Ascot aboard Fallen For You, where Buick completed a treble after he won the Albany Stakes aboard Newfangled and the Wolferton Stakes with Gatewood on day four of the royal meeting. Buick said: "It's fantastic - these are the days that jockeys dream of. Just to have a horse that runs well at Royal Ascot is very good. To have a winner is fantastic and to have three winners in one day is really amazing." He went away from Royal Ascot with five winners in total. Nathaniel, on whom Buick had won the King George VI and Queen Elizabeth Stakes in 2011, was bidding to become the third horse in history to win the race back to back after a successful seasonal debut in the Eclipse Stakes two weeks prior. However, after a photo finish between the 2011 winner Nathaniel and the 2011 Prix de l'Arc de Triomphe winner Danedream, the latter prevailed on the bob of a head. The day after the King George, Buick steered the sister of Nathaniel, Great Heavens, to Group 1 success in Ireland in the Irish Oaks on his 24th birthday, making that Buick's fifth Group 1 victory of the year. His other Group 1 victory in Ireland came on Izzi Top in the Pretty Polly Stakes, on whom he also won the Prix Jean Romanet in France later that year. Buick had three Group 1 victories in France in 2012, the other two being Elusive Kate in the Prix Rothschild and globetrotting Gordon Lord Byron in the Prix de la Forêt. Buick then won the Nunthorpe Stakes during the Ebor Festival at York aboard the Australian mare Ortensia, on whom he also won the King George Stakes at Goodwood that year. He brought Ortensia from what looked like an impossible position two furlongs out, to win by a neck from Spirit Quartz. The Gran Premio di Milano gave Buick a Group 2 win in Italy. Buick finished a successful year with well over 100 winners and finished third in the British Flat Jockeys' Championship.

=== 2013 ===
Buick won six Group 1 races in 2013. He achieved his first Group 1 success for Godolphin on the Saeed bin Suroor trained Sajjhaa in the Jebel Hatta at Meydan. His other Group 1 winners were all fillies trained by Gosden. Elusive Kate won the Falmouth Stakes and the Prix Rothschild, Winsili won the Nassau Stakes and The Fugue won the Yorkshire Oaks and the Irish Champion Stakes.

=== 2014 ===
The Fugue provided Buick with another Group 1 victory in the Prince of Wales's Stakes at Royal Ascot in June 2014. There was a second victory in the Nassau Stakes, this time on the Gosden trained filly Sultanina. In October, Buick rode the Charlie Appleby trained colt Charming Thought to victory in the Middle Park Stakes, giving Godolphin their first British Group 1 win of the season. Charming Thought started at odds of 20/1 and beat the odds-on favourite, Ivawood, by a nose in a photo-finish. In November 2014, Buick signed with Godolphin to ride as first jockey to trainer Charlie Appleby, while James Doyle was signed as first jockey to Godolphin trainer bin Suroor. Buick said: "I have been very fortunate to have been employed by John Gosden since I completed my apprenticeship and without his faith and wise counsel I would not be in the position that I am in today to take what is, in my opinion, the most coveted position in world racing".

=== 2015 ===
Buick's association with Godolphin got off to an auspicious start when, on 28 March 2015, Buick rode Prince Bishop to victory in the Dubai World Cup, one of the richest ($10 million) races in horse racing. Prince Bishop was trained by bin Suroor and started at odds of 14/1, with Doyle taking the ride on bin Suroor's more fancied runner, African Story, who finished in sixth place.

In June Buick came second on Jack Hobbs in the Epsom Derby before riding him to victory in the Irish Derby. Later that month Buick's ride on Space Age in the King George V Stakes gave Appleby his first Royal Ascot victory. Buick's third Group 1 win of the year was achieved in October in the Middle Park Stakes on Lumiere, trained by Mark johnston for Hamdan bin Mohammed Al Maktoum.

=== 2016 ===
The year started well for Buick with victories at Meydan on Tryster in the Dubai Millennium Stakes and Jebel Hatta. At Royal Ascot in June there were wins on Ribchester in the Jersey Stakes and on Hawkbill in the Tercentenary Stakes. At the end of June Buick was handed a 15-day suspension when Highlands Queen, his mount in the Prix de Diane (French Oaks) at Chantilly, was judged to have caused interference. The suspension was doubled when Buick called the stewards corrupt, something for which he later apologised. Before the ban came into force he was able to ride Hawkbill to victory in the Eclipse Stakes at Sandown. In October there was a more fortunate return to Chantilly when two-year-old Wuheida won the Group 1 Prix Marcel Boussac. In September it was announced that Buick would replace Doyle as first pick jockey for Godolphin trainer bin Suroor.

=== 2017 ===
In March Buick achieved his second victory in the Dubai Sheema Classic at Meydan, this time on Jack Hobbs. In May he won the Prix Saint-Alary at Longchamp on Sobetsu. At Royal Ascot Buick rode four winners, including Ribchester in the Queen Anne Stakes. Ribchester had also provided him with another Group 1 win in the Lockinge Stakes at Newbury in May. Racing In August he suffered a compression fracture of a vertebra when he fell from Permian, who broke a leg and was destroyed at the end of the Secretariat Stakes in Chicago. He returned from injury in October, and in November won the Breeders' Cup Filly & Mare Turf in California on Wuheida.

=== 2018 ===
In 2018, Buick won the Epsom Derby on Masar. It was his eighth ride in the race. After the race he was quoted as saying: "It's something really special, the Derby, it's the pinnacle of our sport, it's the holy grail, the be-all and end-all, it's everything. It means the absolute world to me." Buick rode Blue Point to victory in the King's Stand Stakes at Royal Ascot and he also rode winners in Group 1 races in France, Hong Kong, the Republic of Ireland, the United Arab Emirates and the USA. The year ended on a disappointing note when he received a six-week ban for reckless riding in the Hong Kong Vase at Sha Tin.

=== 2019 ===
In March there were two victories for Buick in Group 1 races at Dubai World Cup Night. He was out of action for three months following a fall on the way to post at Ascot in May. At first he was thought to be uninjured, remounting to ride in the race and then riding a winner the following day. He later felt unwell and went to Addenbrooke's Hospital where he underwent tests and was diagnosed with a post head-injury syndrome. After returning to racing in August, he won the Vincent O'Brien National Stakes and the Dewhurst Stakes on Pinatubo, and a Group 1 race in Germany on Ghaiyyath.

=== 2020 ===
Buick rode Barney Roy to victory in the Jebel Hatta at Meydan in March, before racing closed down due to the COVID-19 pandemic. After racing resumed behind closed doors in the United Kingdom in June, he rode Pinatubo into third place in the postponed 2000 Guineas at Newmarket. Ghaiyyath provided him with a victory in the Group 1 Coronation Cup at Epsom Downs Racecourse. At Royal Ascot Buick had two wins, in the Royal Hunt Cup on Dark Vision and the Silver Wokingham Handicap on Chiefofchiefs, and rode Pinatubo into second place in the St James's Palace Stakes. Buick picked up a spare ride for Ballydoyle in the Derby, coming third on 66/1 outsider Amhran Na Bhfiann, beaten six lengths by stablemate Serpentine. On 5 July he rode Ghaiyyath to victory in the Eclipse Stakes and his partnership with Pinatubo recaptured its winning form with victory in the Prix Jean Prat at Deauville on 12 July, one of three victories for Buick and trainer Appleby on the day. Barney Roy won the Bayerisches Zuchtrennen in Germany to give Buick a third Group 1 victory in July. In August Space Blues won the Prix Maurice de Gheest at Deauville and Ghaiyyath was victorious in the International Stakes at York. Buick's eighth and final Group 1 win of the season came on Wonderful Tonight, trained by David Menuisier, in the British Champions Fillies and Mares Stakes on British Champions Day on 17 October 2017.

Buick finished second in the 2020 jockeys' championship with 133 wins to champion Oisin Murphy's 142. It later emerged that Murphy had ridden eleven winners when he should have been self-isolating under COVID regulations after returning from a holiday in Greece in September 2020.

=== 2021 ===
Buick completed another successful year with nine European Group 1 wins, eight of them for Appleby, including the Irish Derby, the Grand Prix de Paris and the St Leger on Hurricane Lane, and the Vincent O'Brien National Stakes and Dewhurst Stakes on the two-year-old Native Trail. He rode Saffron Beach, trained by Jane Chapple-Hyam, to victory in the Sun Chariot Stakes. In addition to his nine European Group 1 wins, Buick won three Grade 1 races at the Breeders' Cup meeting in the United States in November. He was leading jockey at the Goodwood Festival, with seven wins.

Buick finished the season second in the jockey's championship, just two wins behind Oisin Murphy. On 25 February 2022, Buick won the 2021 flat jockey of the year Lester award.

=== 2022 ===
Having won five Group 2 and Group 3 races in Dubai in January and February, Buick missed the Saudi Cup meeting in Riyadh, Saudi Arabia due to testing positive for COVID-19. Classic success came on Native Trail in the Irish 2,000 Guineas and Buick achieved a further nine Group/Grade 1 victories. At the end of the season he was crowned British flat racing Champion Jockey with 157 winners. Over the calendar year he achieved a double century of winners in Great Britain for the first time, at a strike rate of 27 per cent. He also won the flat jockey of the year Lester award for the second year running.

Although Buick's champion jockey title came too late for Ian Balding to win on his 2006 bet that the jockey would win the championship by 2020, the Tote honoured a verbal bet the trainer had made and donated the £5,000 winnings to the Injured Jockeys' Fund.

=== 2023 ===
Buick retained his Champion Jockey title with 133 winners at a strike rate of 22 per cent. There were only five Group/Grade wins as a number of good Godolphin horses had been retired.

=== 2024 ===
In May, Buick won the 2000 Guineas on Notable Speech, who started at odds of 16/1. He finished the season in fifth place in the title race, with 81 winners at a strike rate of 21 per cent.

== Personal life ==
On 1 August 2021, Buick married long-term partner Jane Duncan at Cheveley parish church. The couple have two sons, Thomas and Oscar. Their eldest son, Thomas, has autism and the couple are ambassadors for Autism in Racing. Buick's father-in-law, Roderick Duncan, has been clerk of the course at Doncaster and Huntingdon.

== Major wins ==
Canada

- Canadian International Stakes - (1) - Nations Pride (2023)
- E. P. Taylor Stakes – (1) – Lahaleeb (2009)
- Woodbine Mile - (4) - Modern Games (2022), Master of the Seas (2023), Notable Speech (2025, 2026)
- Summer Stakes - (2) - Mysterious Night (2022), Al Hudaiba (2026)

France

- Grand Prix de Paris - (1) - Hurricane Lane (2021)
- Poule d'Essai des Poulains- (1) - Modern Games (2022)
- Prix de l'Opéra - (1) - Wild Illusion (2018)
- Prix de la Forêt – (3) – Dream Ahead (2011), Gordon Lord Byron (2012), Space Blues (2021)
- Prix Jacques Le Marois - (1) - Ribchester (2016)
- Prix Jean Prat - (1) - Pinatubo (2020)
- Prix Jean Romanet - (1) - Izzi Top (2012)
- Prix Marcel Boussac - (2) - Elusive Kate (2011), Wuheida (2016)
- Prix Maurice de Gheest - (1) - Space Blues (2020)
- Prix Morny – (1) – Dream Ahead (2010)
- Prix Rothschild - (3) - Elusive Kate (2012, 2013), Saffron Beach (2022)
- Prix Saint-Alary - (1) - Sobetsu (2017)

Germany

- Grosser Preis von Baden – (1) – Ghaiyyath (2019)
- Bayerisches Zuchtrennen – (2) – Barney Roy (2020), Nations Pride (2023)
- Preis von Europa - (2) - Rebel's Romance (2022, 2024)

(United Kingdom) Great Britain

- 1000 Guineas - (1) - Desert Flower (2025)
- 2000 Guineas - (2) - Notable Speech (2024), Ruling Court (2025)
- Ascot Gold Cup - (1) - Trawlerman (2025)
- British Champions Fillies and Mares Stakes - (2)- Wonderful Tonight (2020), Kalpana (2024)
- British Champions Long Distance Cup - (1) - Trawlerman (2025)
- British Champions Sprint Stakes - (1)- Creative Force (2021)
- Champion Stakes - (1) Ombudsman (2026)
- City of York Stakes - (1)- Notable Speech (2026)
- Cheveley Park Stakes - (2) - Lumiere (2015), Lezoo (2022)
- Coronation Cup - (1) - Ghaiyyath (2020)
- Coronation Stakes - (1) - Fallen For You (2012)
- Dewhurst Stakes - (3) - Pinatubo (2019), Native Trail (2021), Shadow of Light (2024)
- Eclipse Stakes - (3) - Nathaniel (2012), Hawkbill (2016), Ghaiyyath (2020)
- Epsom Derby - (1) - Masar (2018)
- Falmouth Stakes - (2) - Elusive Kate (2013), Cinderella's Dream (2025)
- Fillies' Mile - (2) - Desert Flower (2024), Musical Times (2026)
- Futurity Trophy - (1) - Ancient Wisdom (2023)
- Haydock Sprint Cup – (2) – Dream Ahead (2011), Big Mojo (2025)
- International Stakes - (2) Ghaiyyath (2020), Ombudsman (2025)
- July Cup - (1) Mill Stream (2024)
- King George VI and Queen Elizabeth Stakes – (2) – Nathaniel (2011), Adayar (2021)
- King's Stand Stakes - (1) - Blue Point (2018)
- Lockinge Stakes - (3) - Ribchester (2017), Modern Games (2023), Notable Speech (2026)
- Middle Park Stakes – (4) – Dream Ahead (2010), Charming Thought (2014), Shadow of Light (2024), Wise Approach (2025)
- Nassau Stakes - (3) - Winsili (2013), Sultanina (2014), Wild Illusion (2018)
- Nunthorpe Stakes - (1) - Ortensia (2012)
- Prince of Wales's Stakes - (3) - The Fugue (2014), Ombudsman (2025, 2026)
- Queen Anne Stakes - (1) - Ribchester (2017)
- Queen Elizabeth II Stakes - (1) - Talk of New York (2026)
- St. James's Palace Stakes – (1) – Coroebus (2022)
- St. Leger Stakes – (3) – Arctic Cosmos (2010), Masked Marvel (2011), Hurricane Lane (2021)
- Sun Chariot Stakes – (1) – Saffron Beach (2021)
- Sussex Stakes - (1) - Notable Speech (2024)
- Yorkshire Oaks - (1) - The Fugue (2013)

Hong Kong

- Queen Elizabeth II Cup - (1) - Pakistan Star (2018)
- Hong Kong Champions & Chater Cup - (1) - Rebel's Romance (2024)

(Republic of Ireland) Ireland

- Irish Derby - (2) - Jack Hobbs (2015), Hurricane Lane (2021)
- Irish Champion Stakes - (1) - The Fugue (2013)
- Irish Oaks - (1) - Great Heavens (2012)
- Irish 2,000 Guineas - (1) - Native Trail (2022)
- Pretty Polly Stakes - (1) - Izzi Top (2012)
- Vincent O'Brien National Stakes - (3) - Quorto (2018), Pinatubo (2019). Native Trail (2021)

Italy

- Gran Premio di Milano - (1) - Earl of Tinsdal (2012)

Japan

- Mile Championship - (1) - Stelvio (2018)

United Arab Emirates

- Dubai Sheema Classic – (5) – Dar Re Mi (2010), Jack Hobbs (2017), Hawkbill (2018), Old Persian (2019), Rebel's Romance (2024)
- Dubai Turf - (1) - Ombudsman (2026)
- Jebel Hatta - (5) Sajjhaa (2013), Tryster (2016), Barney Roy (2020), Measured Time (2024), Opera Ballo (2026)
- Dubai World Cup - (1) - Prince Bishop (2015)
- Al Quoz Sprint - (2) - Blue Point (2019), Believing (2025)

United States

- Arlington Million – (2) – Debussy (2010), Nations Pride (2024)
- Belmont Oaks – (1) – Cinderella's Dream (2024)
- Breeders' Cup Filly & Mare Turf - (1) - Wuheida (2017)
- Breeders' Cup Juvenile Turf - (2) - Line of Duty (2018), Modern Games (2021)
- Breeders' Cup Juvenile Turf Sprint - (1) - Mischief Magic (2022)
- Breeders' Cup Turf - (2) - Yibir (2021), Rebel's Romance (2024)
- Breeders' Cup Mile – (4) – Space Blues (2021), Modern Games (2022), Master Of The Seas (2023), Notable Speech (2025)
- Maker's Mark Mile Stakes – (1) – Master of The Seas (2024)
- Manhattan Stakes – (1) – Measured Time (2024)
- Saratoga Derby Invitational Stakes - (1) - Nations Pride (2022)
