= Courage Mon Ami =

- Breed: Thoroughbred
- Sire: Frankel
- Grandsire: Galileo
- Dam: Crimson Ribbon
- Damsire: Lemon Drop Kid
- Sex: Gelding
- Foaled: 11 March 2019
- Country: United Kingdom
- Colour: Bay
- Breeder: Hascombe & Valiant Stud Ltd
- Owner: Wathnan Racing
- Trainer: John and Thady Gosden
- Record: 6: 4–1–0

Major wins
- Ascot Gold Cup (2023)

Courage Mon Ami (foaled 11 March 2019) is a British Thoroughbred racehorse trained by John and Thady Gosden at Clarehaven Stables in Newmarket, Suffolk. A bay gelding by Frankel out of the Lemon Drop Kid mare Crimson Ribbon, he won the Ascot Gold Cup at Royal Ascot in June 2023, providing Frankie Dettori with his ninth victory in the race and his first Group 1 winner for new owners Wathnan Racing in only their third runner. He was retired from racing in November 2025 following a tibia injury sustained after his Gold Cup win.

== Background ==
Courage Mon Ami is a bay gelding bred in the United Kingdom by Anthony Oppenheimer's Hascombe & Valiant Stud in Surrey. He is by Frankel, the undefeated champion racehorse and son of Galileo, out of Crimson Ribbon, an American-bred mare by Lemon Drop Kid (by Kingmambo). Crimson Ribbon is a winning mare who has produced two other stakes winners: Astronomos, a listed winner in Australia by New Approach, and Crimson Rosette, a listed winner and group-placed performer by Teofilo. Courage Mon Ami was bred in the same Frankel crop as Inspiral, Nashwa and Westover.

Oppenheimer sold Courage Mon Ami prior to Royal Ascot 2023, having won his first three races for the breeder. John Gosden explained at the time: "He was bred by Anthony Oppenheimer who sold him because it costs a great deal of money for English breeders to keep their studs going." He was purchased privately by Wathnan Racing, the operation of the Emir of Qatar Tamim bin Hamad Al Thani, through bloodstock agent Richard Brown alongside the Queen's Vase winner Gregory.

== Racing career ==
=== Early career ===
Courage Mon Ami made his racecourse debut on the all-weather and won his first two starts before stepping up to turf racing. He recorded a third consecutive victory in a handicap at Goodwood in May 2023, beating his rivals by a combined margin of thirteen and three-quarter lengths across his first three starts, all for owner-breeder Anthony Oppenheimer. He entered the Ascot Gold Cup as a four-year-old with only three races to his name, making him the least experienced horse in the twelve-runner field.

=== 2023: Ascot Gold Cup ===
Courage Mon Ami's defining victory came in the Ascot Gold Cup at Royal Ascot on 22 June 2023, a Group 1 race run over two miles and three furlongs (approximately 3,700 metres). Ridden by Frankie Dettori, who was competing in his final season as a professional jockey in Britain, he started at odds of 15–2 in a field that included the Goodwood Cup winner Coltrane and the 2021 Gold Cup winner Subjectivist.

Dettori settled Courage Mon Ami towards the rear of the field, travelling towards the inside rail to save ground as Subjectivist set a strong pace. Approaching the final furlong, Dettori threaded his mount through a gap on the rail to overhaul Coltrane inside the final furlong, winning by three-quarters of a length with Subjectivist a further three and three-quarter lengths back in third. The victory was Dettori's ninth in the Gold Cup, following previous wins aboard Drum Taps (1992 and 1993), Kayf Tara (1998), Papineau (2004), Colour Vision (2012) and Stradivarius (2018, 2019 and 2020).

John Gosden described the victory as a remarkable piece of training given the horse's inexperience over the Gold Cup distance: "You can't practise two and a half miles at home, but Frankie stayed cool and rode him cool in the dark down the inside, saving every inch." The win was also the first Group 1 victory for Wathnan Racing, who had only their third runner in the race. The Gold Cup trophy was presented by King Charles III, who was attending his first Royal Ascot as monarch.

=== Subsequent career ===
Following his Gold Cup triumph, Courage Mon Ami ran twice more in 2023. He finished sixth of eleven runners in the Goodwood Cup at Goodwood in August before finishing second to Coltrane in the Lonsdale Cup at York later that month. He was subsequently found to have sustained a tibia injury, which kept him off the track. He did not race again.

== Retirement ==
Courage Mon Ami was retired from racing in November 2025 after failing to recover sufficiently from his tibia injury to return to the racetrack. He was sent to Wathnan Stud near Doha in Qatar, the breeding operation of the Emir of Qatar.

== Pedigree ==
Pedigree of Courage Mon Ami (GB), bay gelding, 2019
Sire Frankel (GB) 2008	Galileo (IRE); 1998	Sadler's Wells (USA)	Northern Dancer (CAN)
Sire Frankel (GB) 2008	Galileo (IRE); 1998	Sadler's Wells (USA)	Fairy Bridge (USA)
Sire Frankel (GB) 2008	Galileo (IRE); 1998	Urban Sea (USA)	Miswaki (USA)
Sire Frankel (GB) 2008	Galileo (IRE); 1998	Urban Sea (USA)	Allegretta (GB)
Sire Frankel (GB) 2008	Kind (IRE); 2001	Danehill (USA)	Danzig (USA)
Sire Frankel (GB) 2008	Kind (IRE); 2001	Danehill (USA)	Razyana (USA)
Sire Frankel (GB) 2008	Kind (IRE); 2001	Rainbow Lake (GB)	Rainbow Quest (USA)
Sire Frankel (GB) 2008	Kind (IRE); 2001	Rainbow Lake (GB)	Rockfest (USA)
Dam Crimson Ribbon (USA)	Lemon Drop Kid (USA); 1996	Kingmambo (USA)	Mr. Prospector (USA)
Dam Crimson Ribbon (USA)	Lemon Drop Kid (USA); 1996	Kingmambo (USA)	Miesque (USA)
Dam Crimson Ribbon (USA)	Lemon Drop Kid (USA); 1996	Charming Lassie (USA)	Seattle Slew (USA)
Dam Crimson Ribbon (USA)	Lemon Drop Kid (USA); 1996	Charming Lassie (USA)	Lassie Dear (USA)
Dam Crimson Ribbon (USA)	Victoria Cross (IRE)	Mark of Esteem (IRE)	Darshaan (GB)
Dam Crimson Ribbon (USA)	Victoria Cross (IRE)	Mark of Esteem (IRE)	Homage (GB)
Dam Crimson Ribbon (USA)	Victoria Cross (IRE)	Glowing With Pride (GB)	Ile de Bourbon (USA)
Dam Crimson Ribbon (USA)	Victoria Cross (IRE)	Glowing With Pride (GB)	Be Easy (GB)
