= Field Of Gold =

Irish-bred Thoroughbred racehorse

- The racing silks of Juddmonte
- Sire: Kingman
- Grandsire: Invincible Spirit
- Dam: Princess De Lune
- Damsire: Shamardal
- Sex: Stallion
- Foaled: 2022
- Country: Ireland
- Colour: Grey
- Breeder: Roundhill Stud
- Owner: Juddmonte
- Trainer: John and Thady Gosden
- Record: 11: 5-2-1
- Earnings: £957,298

Major wins
- Solario Stakes (2024); Craven Stakes (2025); Irish 2,000 Guineas (2025); St James's Palace Stakes (2025)

Field Of Gold (foaled 2022) is an Irish-bred Thoroughbred racehorse. Trained by John and Thady Gosden for Juddmonte, he developed into a leading European miler of his generation, winning the Solario Stakes as a two-year-old before taking the Craven Stakes, Irish 2,000 Guineas and St James's Palace Stakes as a three-year-old. He was retired to stud aged four.

== Background ==
Field Of Gold is a grey stallion bred in Ireland by Roundhill Stud. He was sired by Kingman, a champion miler whose wins included the Irish 2,000 Guineas, St James's Palace Stakes, Sussex Stakes and Prix Jacques Le Marois. His dam, Princess De Lune, is a daughter of Shamardal. He was sold to Juddmonte for €530,000 at the Goffs November Foal Sale and went into training with John and Thady Gosden at Newmarket.

== Racing career ==
=== Two-year-old season ===
Field of Gold made his racecourse debut in June 2024 at Doncaster. Ridden by Robert Havlin, he came third in a Novice Stakes over seven furlongs. In July he started as favourite in a Maiden Stakes over seven furlongs at Newmarket. On this occasion, and for his next four races, he was ridden by the Gosdens' stable jockey Kieran Shoemark and won by three-and-a-quarter lengths.

He was then moved up in class for the Group 3 Solario Stakes at Sandown Park in August. He finished first of seven runners, beating Matauri Bay by three-quarters of a length, with Royal Playwright finishing third. His final race of the season was the Prix Jean-Luc Lagardère at Longchamp in Paris in October. Unsuited by the soft ground, he finished fourth, two-and-a-quarter lengths behind winner Camille Pissarro.

=== Three-year-old season ===
Stepped up to one mile in distance, Field Of Gold began his three-year-old season in the Craven Stakes at Newmarket. Ridden by Kieran Shoemark, he produced a strong finishing performance to win the Group 3 race and became a leading contender for the 2,000 Guineas.

On 3 May 2025, Field Of Gold was sent off 11/8 favourite in the 2,000 Guineas at Newmarket. In the early stages of the race he settled near the back of the field beside the eventual winner Ruling Court, ridden by William Buick. In spite of a fast finish, he could not catch the winner and was beaten by half a length. After the race, John Gosden said: "We were sat some way back. The winner has kicked and gone and we ran out of racetrack. Given another 25 yards the race would have been ours." Gosden blamed Kieran Shoemark for Field of Gold's defeat and the jockey lost his position as stable jockey.

Colin Keane was subsequently called up to ride Field Of Gold in the Irish 2,000 Guineas the Curragh on 24 May. Starting as evens favourite, Field Of Gold won by an impressive three-and-three-quarters lengths. His sire Kingman had won the race in 2014. Following the victory, Keane was offered the position of retained rider to Juddmonte and would ride Field of Gold in three of his next four races.

At Royal Ascot in June, Field Of Gold started as odds-on favourite for the St James's Palace Stakes, another race won by his sire in 2014. He claimed an emphatic victory in the race, beating Henry Matisse, winner of the French 2,000 Guineas, by three-and-a-half lengths, with British 2,000 Guineas winner Ruling Court a similar distance behind in third place.

On 30 July, Field Of Gold started odds-on favourite for the Sussex Stakes at Goodwood. Ridden by William Buick as Colin Keane was serving a whip suspension, he finished in fourth place in a race won by his pacemaker, 150/1 outsider Qirat. The day after the race, he was found to be lame in his left hind leg. He did not race again until October, when he started favourite in the Queen Elizabeth II Stakes at Ascot. He finished in fifth place, two-and-three-quarters lengths behind the winner, 100/1 outsider Cicero's Gift.

=== Four-year-old season and retirement ===
In April 2026, Field Of Gold contested the Sandown Mile. Starting as evens favourite, he was beaten three lengths into second place by Opera Ballo. He bled from the nose during the race and was later was found to have a lung infection. He recovered from the infection, but his owners announced on 5 July 2026 that he was being retired to stud at their Banstead Manor Stud near Newmarket, where he would join the stallion roster for the 2027 season.

== Pedigree ==
Pedigree of Field Of Gold
Sire Kingman (GB) b. 2011	Invincible Spirit (IRE) b. 1997	Green Desert (USA)	Danzig (USA)
Sire Kingman (GB) b. 2011	Invincible Spirit (IRE) b. 1997	Green Desert (USA)	Foreign Courier (USA)
Sire Kingman (GB) b. 2011	Invincible Spirit (IRE) b. 1997	Rafha (GB)	Kris (GB)
Sire Kingman (GB) b. 2011	Invincible Spirit (IRE) b. 1997	Rafha (GB)	Eljazzi (IRE)
Sire Kingman (GB) b. 2011	Zenda (GB) b. 1999	Zamindar (USA)	Gone West (USA)
Sire Kingman (GB) b. 2011	Zenda (GB) b. 1999	Zamindar (USA)	Zaizafon (USA)
Sire Kingman (GB) b. 2011	Zenda (GB) b. 1999	Hope (IRE)	Dancing Brave (USA)
Sire Kingman (GB) b. 2011	Zenda (GB) b. 1999	Hope (IRE)	Bahamian (IRE)
Dam Princess de Lune (IRE) gr. 2014	Shamardal (USA) b. 2002	Giant's Causeway (USA)	Storm Cat (USA)
Dam Princess de Lune (IRE) gr. 2014	Shamardal (USA) b. 2002	Giant's Causeway (USA)	Mariah's Storm (USA)
Dam Princess de Lune (IRE) gr. 2014	Shamardal (USA) b. 2002	Helsinki (GB)	Machiavellian (USA)
Dam Princess de Lune (IRE) gr. 2014	Shamardal (USA) b. 2002	Helsinki (GB)	Helen Street (GB)
Dam Princess de Lune (IRE) gr. 2014	Princess Serena (USA) gr. 1999	Unbridled's Song (USA)	Unbridled (USA)
Dam Princess de Lune (IRE) gr. 2014	Princess Serena (USA) gr. 1999	Unbridled's Song (USA)	Trolley Song (USA)
Dam Princess de Lune (IRE) gr. 2014	Princess Serena (USA) gr. 1999	Serena's Sister (USA)	Rahy (USA)
Dam Princess de Lune (IRE) gr. 2014	Princess Serena (USA) gr. 1999	Serena's Sister (USA)	Imagining (USA)
