= Commissioning (horse) =

British Thoroughbred racehorse

- Sire: Kingman
- Grandsire: Invincible Spirit
- Dam: Sovereign Parade
- Damsire: Galileo
- Sex: Filly
- Foaled: 2020
- Country: United Kingdom
- Colour: Bay
- Breeder: Isa Salman & Abdulla Al Khalifa
- Owner: Isa Salman & Abdulla Al Khalifa
- Trainer: John and Thady Gosden
- Record: 3: 3-0-0

Major wins
- Rockfel Stakes (2022); Fillies' Mile (2022)
- Last updated on 14 May 2026

Commissioning (foaled 2020) is a British Thoroughbred racehorse. Trained by John and Thady Gosden, she was unbeaten in three starts as a two-year-old in 2022, winning the Rockfel Stakes and the Group 1 Fillies' Mile at Newmarket. She was regarded as a leading contender for the following year's 1000 Guineas before being retired after sustaining a fetlock injury.

== Background ==
Commissioning is a bay filly bred in the United Kingdom by Isa Salman and Abdulla Al Khalifa. She was sired by Kingman, a leading miler trained by John Gosden whose major victories included the Irish 2,000 Guineas, St James's Palace Stakes, Sussex Stakes and Prix Jacques Le Marois. Her dam, Sovereign Parade, was a daughter of Galileo.

Commissioning raced in the colours of Isa Salman and Abdulla Al Khalifa and was trained at Newmarket by John and Thady Gosden.

== Racing career ==
Commissioning made a promising debut in a fillies' novice race over seven furlongs at Newmarket. Ridden by Frankie Dettori, she won from Prepense.

She was then moved up in class for the Rockfel Stakes, a Group 2 race over seven furlongs at Newmarket. Ridden by Robert Havlin, she maintained her unbeaten record and emerged as a leading contender for the following season's 1000 Guineas. After the race, John Gosden said that he had trained her dam, Sovereign Parade, and described the success as particularly pleasing for her owner-breeders.

Commissioning completed her unbeaten juvenile campaign in the Group 1 Fillies' Mile over one mile at Newmarket. Starting favourite and again ridden by Robert Havlin, she travelled prominently before taking the lead in the closing stages and winning from Novakai, with Bright Diamond finishing third. The victory gave Havlin his first Group 1 win after more than thirty years as a jockey. The Thoroughbred Daily News described Commissioning as a homebred filly who had progressed from her Newmarket debut win to the Rockfel Stakes and then the Fillies' Mile.

Commissioning was expected to be a leading contender for the 1000 Guineas, but did not race again after her two-year-old season. She was retired after sustaining an injury to her left hind fetlock.

== Breeding career ==
After retirement, she was exported to Japan, where she would become a broodmare. Her 2025 crop, a colt by Contrail, was bought by Junko Kondo for 220 million JPY (About 1.49 million USD) at the JRHA Select Sale.

== Assessment ==
Commissioning ended her racing career unbeaten in three starts. Her wins in the Rockfel Stakes and Fillies' Mile established her as a leading British-trained juvenile filly of 2022 and a prominent early contender for the following year's 1000 Guineas.

== Pedigree ==
Pedigree of Commissioning (GB)
Sire Kingman (GB) b. 2011	Invincible Spirit (IRE) b. 1997	Green Desert (USA)	Danzig (USA)
Sire Kingman (GB) b. 2011	Invincible Spirit (IRE) b. 1997	Green Desert (USA)	Foreign Courier (USA)
Sire Kingman (GB) b. 2011	Invincible Spirit (IRE) b. 1997	Rafha (GB)	Kris (GB)
Sire Kingman (GB) b. 2011	Invincible Spirit (IRE) b. 1997	Rafha (GB)	Eljazzi (IRE)
Sire Kingman (GB) b. 2011	Zenda (GB) b. 1999	Zamindar (USA)	Gone West (USA)
Sire Kingman (GB) b. 2011	Zenda (GB) b. 1999	Zamindar (USA)	Zaizafon (USA)
Sire Kingman (GB) b. 2011	Zenda (GB) b. 1999	Hope (IRE)	Dancing Brave (USA)
Sire Kingman (GB) b. 2011	Zenda (GB) b. 1999	Hope (IRE)	Bahamian (IRE)
Dam Sovereign Parade (IRE) b. 2013	Galileo (IRE) b. 1998	Sadler's Wells (USA)	Northern Dancer (CAN)
Dam Sovereign Parade (IRE) b. 2013	Galileo (IRE) b. 1998	Sadler's Wells (USA)	Fairy Bridge (USA)
Dam Sovereign Parade (IRE) b. 2013	Galileo (IRE) b. 1998	Urban Sea (USA)	Miswaki (USA)
Dam Sovereign Parade (IRE) b. 2013	Galileo (IRE) b. 1998	Urban Sea (USA)	Allegretta (GB)
Dam Sovereign Parade (IRE) b. 2013	Dialafra (FR) gr. 2007	Anabaa (USA)	Danzig (USA)
Dam Sovereign Parade (IRE) b. 2013	Dialafra (FR) gr. 2007	Anabaa (USA)	Balbonella (FR)
Dam Sovereign Parade (IRE) b. 2013	Dialafra (FR) gr. 2007	Diamilina (FR)	Linamix (FR)
Dam Sovereign Parade (IRE) b. 2013	Dialafra (FR) gr. 2007	Diamilina (FR)	Diamonaka (FR)
