= John Gosden =

British horse trainer

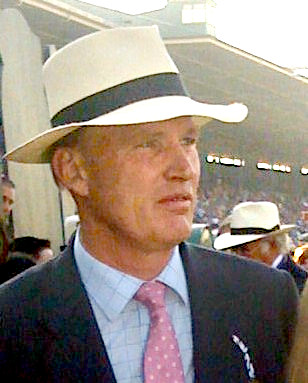
- Gosden in 2008
- Born: John Harry Martin Gosden; 30 March 1951 (age 75); Hove, Sussex, England
- Education: Eastbourne College; Emmanuel College, Cambridge
- Height: 1.95 m (6 ft 5 in)
- Spouse: Rachel Hood
- Children: 4, including: Thady Gosden
- Parent: John "Towser" Gosden
- Horse racing career
- Occupation: Trainer
- Sport: Horse racing
- Career wins: Over 4,000 (ongoing)

Major racing wins
- British Classics: The Derby (1997) (2015); The Oaks (2014) (2017) (2019) (2023); 1,000 Guineas (2000); St. Leger (1996) (2007) (2010) (2011) (2019); International race wins: Prix de l'Arc de Triomphe (2015) (2017) (2018); Breeders' Cup Classic (2008); Breeders' Cup Juvenile Turf (2008) (2009); Breeders' Cup Mile (1984); Breeders' Cup Turf (2018); Dubai Sheema Classic (2010) (2017); Prix de Diane (2015); Poule d'Essai des Pouliches (1999) (2002); Prix de l'Abbaye de Longchamp (1991); Grand Prix de Saint-Cloud (2019); Prix de la Forêt (1992) (2001); Prix Ganay (2018); Prix d'Ispahan (2001); Prix Jacques Le Marois (2014) (2020) (2021); Prix Jean Prat (1995) (2019); Prix Jean Romanet (2012) (2019); Prix Lupin (1995); Prix Marcel Boussac (1996) (2001) (2011); Prix Maurice de Gheest (2002); Prix Morny (2015); Prix de la Salamandre (1995); Prix Vermeille (2019); Irish 2,000 Guineas (2014, 2025); Irish Champion Stakes (1993), (2013), (2015), (2018); Irish Derby (2015); Irish Oaks (2012) (2017) (2019); Matron Stakes (2009); Pretty Polly Stakes (1994) (2009) (2012); Gran Premio del Jockey Club (1996); Gran Premio di Milano (1992) (1997); Grosser Preis von Baden (1992); Premio Presidente della Repubblica (1994); Premio Roma (1993) (1996)

Racing awards
- British flat racing Champion Trainer (2012, 2015, 2018, 2019, 2020, 2023)

Significant horses
- Kingman, Stradivarius, Enable, Golden Horn, Jack Hobbs, Courage Mon Ami, Mostahdaf, Soul Sister, Emily Upjohn, Journey, Commissioning, Nashwa, Inspiral, Loving Dream, Palace Pier, Nazeef, Mishriff, Lord North, Logician, Star Catcher, Coronet, Anapurna, Too Darn Hot, Roaring Lion, Without Parole, Cracksman, Persuasive, Star of Seville, Sultanina, Taghrooda, Winsili, Ravens Pass, Nathaniel, Benny the Dip, Lahan, Shantou, Great Heavens, Fallen For You, Izzi Top, The Fugue, Elusive Kate, Lucarno, Flemensfirth, Arctic Cosmos, Masked Marvel, Maqaasid, Duncan, Dar Re Mi, Donativum, Pounced, Nannina, Rainbow View, Oasis Dream, Virtual, May Ball, Observatory, Malhub, Zenda, Ryafan, Crystal Music, Playful Act, Flemensfirth, Lord of Men, Muhtarram, Prophecy, Wolfhound, Mashaallah, Keen Hunter, Royal Heroine, Debussy, Royal Oath, Bates Motel

John Harry Martin Gosden OBE (born 30 March 1951) is a British horse trainer based at Clarehaven Stables in Newmarket, Suffolk. He has trained more than 4,000 winners worldwide, including more than 200 Group One races across Europe, North America, the Middle East and Asia, and is widely regarded as one of the greatest and most internationally successful trainers in the history of modern thoroughbred horse racing. He has been British flat racing Champion Trainer six times (2012, 2015, 2018, 2019, 2020 and 2023), winning the Epsom Derby twice, the Prix de l'Arc de Triomphe three times, the Breeders' Cup Classic, and the Breeders' Cup Turf twice.

Born in Sussex, Gosden was educated at Emmanuel College, Cambridge, where he studied economics and won Blues for both discus and javelin. He then worked as a pupil assistant to Vincent O'Brien at Ballydoyle in County Tipperary and to Sir Noel Murless at Warren Place in Newmarket.

Starting with only three horses in rented stalls on the backstretch at Santa Anita Park, he gradually built one of the leading stables in American racing. During his decade training in California he accumulated more than 600 winners and established himself as one of the dominant trainers on the West Coast. His first major success came in 1983 when Bates Motel won the Santa Anita Handicap and was named Eclipse Award Champion Older Male Horse. In 1984 he trained Royal Heroine to win the inaugural Breeders' Cup Mile, placing him among the trainers associated with the foundation of what later became racing's premier international championship meeting. He was leading trainer at Del Mar in 1985 and at Hollywood Park Racetrack’s spring–summer meeting in 1986, and won the Hollywood Turf Cup three consecutive times.

Despite his success in the United States, Gosden returned to England in 1989 so his children could go to school in Britain. Taking over the licence at Stanley House Stables, he rebuilt his career within the highly competitive British training system before later moving to Manton in Wiltshire and eventually to Clarehaven Stables in 2006, where he established one of the dominant racing operations in Europe.

Gosden won his first British Classic with Shantou in the 1996 St Leger Stakes and the 1997 Derby with Benny the Dip. At Manton, he won the 1,000 Guineas Stakes with Lahan in 2000. Oasis Dream won both the July Cup and the Nunthorpe Stakes in 2003 before becoming one of Europe's leading sprint sires. In 2008, Raven's Pass became the first British-trained horse to win the Breeders' Cup Classic, defeating the American champion Curlin at Santa Anita. Nathaniel won the King George VI and Queen Elizabeth Stakes in 2011 and later sired Enable, widely regarded as the outstanding European mare of her generation.

Gosden became Champion Trainer in 2012 and amassed Classic victories across all five British Classics: two Derbies (Benny the Dip and Golden Horn), three Oaks (Taghrooda, Enable and Anapurna), the 1,000 Guineas with Lahan and five St Legers (Shantou, Lucarno, Arctic Cosmos, Masked Marvel and Logician). Irish Classic victories include the Irish Derby with Jack Hobbs, the Irish 2,000 Guineas with Kingman and Field Of Gold, and the Irish Oaks with Enable.

Between 2014 and 2019, a Gosden-trained horse was named Cartier Horse of the Year in five of six consecutive seasons. Kingman was unbeaten through four races in 2014, winning the Irish 2,000 Guineas, the St James's Palace Stakes, the Sussex Stakes and the Prix Jacques Le Marois before retiring to become one of the most influential European sires of his generation. Taghrooda won both the Oaks and the King George in 2014. Golden Horn won the Derby, the Eclipse Stakes, the Irish Champion Stakes and the Arc in 2015 and was named Cartier Horse of the Year.

== Early career ==
He was educated at Eastbourne College, and Emmanuel College, Cambridge, where he studied Economics and met his future wife, Rachel Hood, a lawyer. At Cambridge, he was a successful sportsman and won blues for both discus and javelin.

Gosden started as assistant to two of the most successful trainers in the history of racing, first to champion trainer Vincent O'Brien and later, Sir Noel Murless. During his time with both men, they won a number of prestigious races including the Derby, the Oaks and the St. Leger Stakes. He then moved to California, becoming assistant to Tommy Doyle.

== California ==
=== 1979–1983: Early career ===
Gosden began with three horses in rented boxes at Santa Anita as he could not afford anything larger, his wife's work as an attorney paid their rent.

His original three-horse string at Santa Anita contained no obvious star. One horse had a bad tendon, another had a fractured knee, and the third was sound but lacked ability. From that unpromising base, Gosden quickly began to establish himself. He saddled his first winner, Smooth Journey, at Santa Anita in February 1980. His first stakes victory in the United States came at Hollywood Park in 1980, and his first graded stakes winner was Star Pastures in the 1982 Palomar Handicap at Del Mar.

=== 1983–1984: Bates Motel and Royal Heroine ===
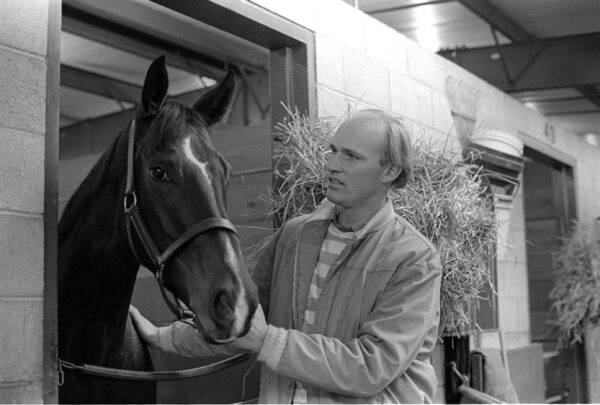
John Gosden with Royal Heroine

In 1983 Gosden trained Bates Motel, a Handicap race horse who gave his young stable national prominence. Bates Motel won the prestigious Santa Anita Handicap, the San Antonio Handicap and the Philip H. Iselin Handicap, and was later voted an Eclipse Award as American Champion Older Male Horse.

Bates Motel's Santa Anita Handicap victory was one of the decisive moments in Gosden's early career. He won the $542,350 race by two and a half lengths from It's The One and Wavering Monarch, confirming his position among the best older horses in the United States. Reflecting on the occasion, Gosden later said: "Bates Motel won 'The Big Cap' in front of 85,000 people, it was some occasion. My first big winner – everybody needs a break in life and that was mine."

The handling of Bates Motel became an early example of Gosden's patience and skill with talented horses. The horse recovered from physical problems to win at the highest level, and jockey Terry Lipham later said that Gosden had "brought that horse back from the dead" after a foot injury. Bates Motel's championship season gave Gosden his first Grade 1 winner and first Eclipse Award winner, only a few years after he had begun with three horses in rented accommodation.

In 1984 Gosden trained Royal Heroine, an Irish-bred turf mare owned by Robert Sangster. Royal Heroine became one of the leading turf mares in North America and one of the defining horses of the first Breeders' Cup meeting.

As a four-year-old, Royal Heroine won the Gamely Stakes and the inaugural Breeders' Cup Mile at Hollywood Park in 1984. In the Breeders' Cup Mile she defeated male rivals and set a North American turf-mile record of 1:32.60. She then won the Matriarch Stakes in her final career start, remained unbeaten in five starts at Hollywood Park, and was voted the 1984 Eclipse Award as Champion Female Turf Horse.

Royal Heroine's speed gave Gosden one of the most historically significant victories of the inaugural Breeders' Cup together with Bates Motel.

=== 1985–1989: Growing success and return to Britain ===
==== Racing record and training titles ====
Gosden continued to build one of the most successful California-based stables of the 1980s. By the time he returned to Britain in 1989, he had won more than 500 races, two trainers' titles, the Breeders' Cup Mile with Royal Heroine, and about $21 million in prize-money. His stable had become a regular presence on the national money list after passing $1 million in purses in 1982, and his highest annual finish was fifth in 1986, when his horses earned $4.7 million.

Over the next few years, Gosden won the Hollywood Turf Cup three times, including with Alphabatim and Zoffany. He won the Yellow Ribbon Stakes twice, the Ramona Handicap twice, and the San Antonio Handicap again with Hatim. He also won both the Matriarch Stakes and the Vanity Handicap twice, the San Luis Rey Handicap with Zoffany, the Carleton F. Burke Handicap with Bel Bolide, the Clement L. Hirsch Turf Championship Stakes with Allez Milord, and the Gamely Stakes for a second time.

Among the other notable horses he trained in California was Barberstown, who finished third in the 1983 Belmont Stakes and later won the Del Mar Handicap. His success with Bates Motel, Royal Heroine, Barberstown and other major winners established his reputation for developing high-class horses from a relatively small and carefully managed stable.

By the mid-1980s Gosden had become one of the leading trainers in the United States. In 1982 he won 48 races and more than $1 million in purses; by mid-1986 he had already won 14 stakes races that year and had won the Hollywood Park training title. He also won the Del Mar trainers' title in 1985.

==== Owners and social circle ====
Gosden trained for several members of the Hollywood entertainment elite, reflecting the long tradition of the film industry's association with the Southern California racetracks. Among his owners were the actress Elizabeth Taylor, the actor Cary Grant — who became a personal friend as well as a client — the singer and actor Bing Crosby, the actor John Forsythe, and the film director and producer Mervyn LeRoy. Gosden later recalled that Taylor was so anxious about her horses sustaining injuries that she was reluctant to let them run at all, describing her as the easiest owner he had trained for on those grounds.

Gosden also earned the respect of the leading figures of the Southern California racing establishment during this period, befriending jockeys Bill Shoemaker and Fernando Toro and drawing praise from veteran trainers including Charlie Whittingham and Bobby Frankel.

==== Return to Britain ====
In 1989, Gosden returned to Britain after Sheikh Mohammed bin Rashid Al Maktoum offered him a position at Stanley House Stables in Newmarket. His California career had taken him from three unsound horses in rented boxes at Santa Anita to more than 600 winners, two Eclipse Award champions, a Breeders' Cup victory, two trainers' titles and the respect of leading American horsemen. Trainer Richard Mandella said at the time: "It's California's loss and England's gain. He's been one of our best trainers and one of our best people."

== Stanley House Stables ==
=== 1991–1992: Return to England ===
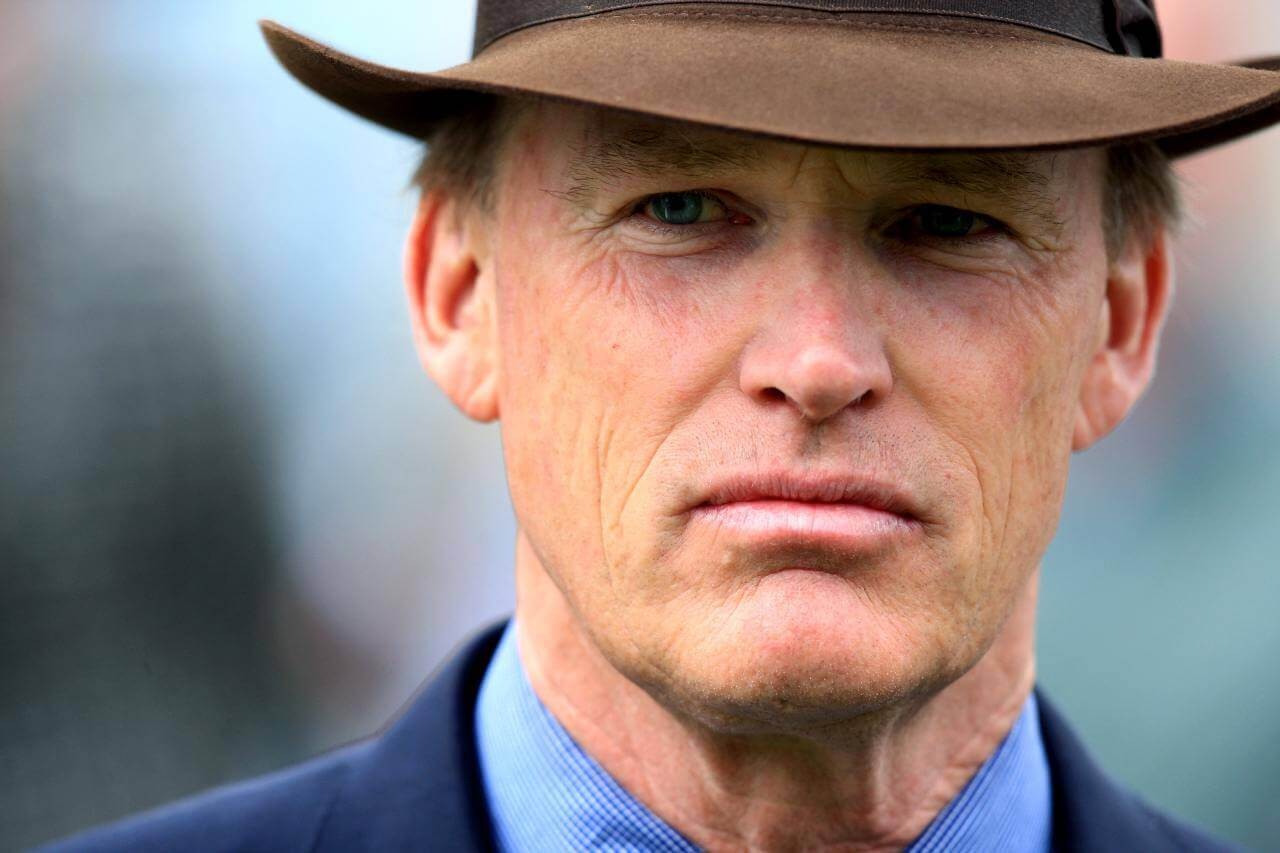
John Gosden in Newmarket

Gosden's early years at Stanley House quickly showed that his American success could be translated back into European racing. In 1991, he won the Prix de l'Abbaye de Longchamp with Keen Hunter and the Sun Chariot Stakes with Ristna. Those victories gave his Newmarket stable early Group 1 success and helped establish him among the leading trainers in Britain after his return from the United States.

Keen Hunter was an important early example of Gosden's ability to campaign a specialist horse effectively. A sprinter, he was prepared for the minimum-distance demands of the Prix de l'Abbaye, one of Europe's most competitive five-furlong races, and provided Gosden with a major French success only two years after his return to England. Ristna, by contrast, showed the stable's range with fillies and mares, winning the Sun Chariot Stakes over a mile and giving Gosden another significant domestic Group 1 win in the same season.

In 1992, Gosden trained more than 100 winners and enjoyed a particularly successful international campaign with Mashaallah. Mashaallah won the Gran Premio di Milano in Italy, the Grosser Preis von Baden in Germany and the Irish St. Leger at the Curragh, becoming one of the leading older staying horses in Europe that year.

Mashaallah's 1992 campaign demonstrated Gosden's skill in placing an older horse internationally. Rather than restricting the horse to Britain, Gosden campaigned him across several major European jurisdictions, using his stamina and soundness to target valuable Group 1 races over middle and staying distances. The sequence of victories in Italy, Germany and Ireland made Mashaallah a rare example of a British-trained horse winning major races in three different European countries in the same season.

Gosden also won the Prix de la Forêt with Wolfhound in 1992. Wolfhound, later a major sprint winner, showed Gosden's ability to develop horses over different distances, winning at Group 1 level in France before later success in Britain.

=== 1993–1995: Partnership with Frankie Dettori ===
==== 1993–1994: Muhtarram and Wolfhound ====
During the mid-1990s, Gosden formed a successful partnership with Frankie Dettori, who rode regularly for the Stanley House stable before becoming closely associated with Godolphin. The pair won hundreds of races together, and the association helped strengthen Gosden's position among the leading Newmarket trainers of the decade.

In 1993, Gosden won the Irish Champion Stakes with Muhtarram, the Cheveley Park Stakes with Prophecy, the Haydock Sprint Cup with Wolfhound and the Premio Roma with Knifebox. Muhtarram's Irish Champion Stakes victory was especially significant because it established him as a top-class middle-distance horse after an interrupted early career. Gosden then kept him in training and developed him into a durable older performer, capable of winning major races in three consecutive seasons.

Wolfhound's victory in the Haydock Sprint Cup added another dimension to the stable's record. Having already won the Prix de la Forêt, he was successfully campaigned as a high-class sprinter, showing Gosden's ability to adapt a horse's programme as its optimum distance became clearer.

In 1994, Gosden won the Prince of Wales's Stakes at Royal Ascot and the Premio Presidente della Repubblica with Muhtarram. The two victories confirmed Muhtarram's status as one of the leading older middle-distance horses in Europe and illustrated Gosden's patient handling of a horse who had improved with age.

Gosden also won the Lockinge Stakes with Emperor Jones and the Pretty Polly Stakes with Del Deya. Emperor Jones gave the stable another major one-mile victory, while Del Deya added further strength to Gosden's record with fillies.

==== 1995: Muhtarram and third Prince of Wales's Stakes ====
In 1995, Gosden won the Prince of Wales's Stakes at Royal Ascot for the second successive year with Muhtarram. Winning the same major Royal Ascot race in consecutive seasons underlined both the horse's consistency and Gosden's ability to keep an older horse at Group 1 level over an extended period.

That year Gosden also won the Prix Jean Prat with Torrential, the Prix Lupin with Flemensfirth and the Prix de la Salamandre with Lord of Men. Flemensfirth developed into a high-class middle-distance performer before later becoming an influential National Hunt sire, while Lord of Men gave Gosden another major juvenile victory in France.

=== 1996–1997: British and French Classics ===
In 1996, Gosden won his first British Classic when Shantou won the St Leger at Doncaster. Shantou also won the Gran Premio del Jockey Club in Italy, confirming his class beyond Britain. His St Leger victory was a milestone for Gosden's British career, giving him a first Classic win after his return from California.

Shantou's progression showed Gosden's effectiveness with staying three-year-olds. The horse was brought to peak form for the final British Classic of the season, then campaigned successfully abroad, reflecting Gosden's willingness to use international targets when they suited a horse's profile.

Gosden also won the Prix Marcel Boussac with Ryafan and the Premio Roma with Flemensfirth in 1996. Ryafan was trained as a juvenile filly of international quality, and her Prix Marcel Boussac success at Longchamp established her as one of the best two-year-old fillies in Europe. Flemensfirth's Premio Roma victory showed the stable's continued strength with older middle-distance horses.

In 1997, Gosden won the Derby with Benny the Dip. The victory gave Gosden his first Derby and followed his first British Classic success with Shantou in the previous year's St Leger. Benny the Dip was ridden by Willie Ryan and defeated Silver Patriarch in a close finish at Epsom.

Benny the Dip's Derby success represented one of the defining achievements of Gosden's first period at Stanley House. The horse had shown high-class form before Epsom, but Gosden produced him for the particular demands of the Derby, where stamina, balance and tactical speed were all required. After the race, owner Landon Knight credited Gosden for the victory, saying: "I have to give the credit to big John (Gosden). Credit is due to Gosden."

Also in 1997, Gosden won the Gran Premio di Milano with Shantou. The victory demonstrated that Shantou had trained on from his Classic-winning three-year-old season and could continue to win major races as an older horse.

Ryafan became one of Gosden's outstanding performers of the decade. In 1997 she won the Falmouth Stakes and Nassau Stakes in England, and then won the Queen Elizabeth II Challenge Cup Stakes, Yellow Ribbon Stakes and Matriarch Stakes in the United States. Her campaign showed Gosden's ability to develop a top-class filly from a juvenile Group 1 winner into an international three-year-old champion. Having already won the Prix Marcel Boussac in 1996, she progressed the following year to win over a mile and over longer distances, before travelling successfully to the United States.

Ryafan's international campaign also reflected Gosden's American experience. She was first trained in Europe to win major races in Britain and France, then sent to the United States, where she was effective on American turf courses and later became the American Champion Female Turf Horse. Her sequence of victories made her one of the clearest examples of Gosden's capacity to manage a horse's career across continents.

Gosden later won the Poule d'Essai des Pouliches in France with Valentine Waltz. The victory added another European Classic to his record and continued the pattern established during the 1990s, in which Stanley House produced major winners in Britain, Ireland, France, Germany, Italy and the United States.

== Manton ==
=== 2000–2001: Lahan, the 1,000 Guineas and Observatory ===
In late 1999, it was announced that Gosden would move to Manton for the beginning of the 2000 season. He quickly enjoyed major successes, in May 2000, he won the 1,000 Guineas Stakes with Lahan. Later in the season, he won both Group One races held at Ascot with Observatory in Queen Elizabeth II Stakes and Crystal Music in the Fillies' Mile. In 2001, he won the Prix de la Forêt with Mount Abu, and the Prix Marcel Boussac with Sulk.

=== 2002–2003: Zenda, the Poule d'Essai and Oasis Dream ===
The 2002 season began well for Gosden. One of his first major victories came when Zenda beat Firth of Lorne in the prestigious Poule d'Essai des Pouliches in France. Coming off the rail in the straight and holding off challenges, the victory was impressive. "Zenda had been working very well at home", said Gosden, "The filly would have won in even better style if she had settled earlier".

He also won the Prix Melisande with Music Club, ridden by Frankie Dettori. Later, Gosden won at Royal Ascot again with Demonstrate in the Buckingham Palace Stakes. He also won the prestigious Golden Jubilee Stakes at Royal Ascot with Malhub. "I did a wild thing three months ago when I entered Malhub for this race", Gosden said, "I felt a mile was too far and decided to drop him back in distance and give him one smart entry over a shorter trip".

He then won the Prix Maurice de Gheest in France with May Ball. "She has been going well at home and we were expecting a big run", Gosden said afterwards, "It's a wonderful advertisement for keeping a five-year-old in training". He also won with at Chester with Treble Heights for football player Michael Owen, and the Solario Stakes with Foss Way. He also won the Strensall Stakes with Binary File and the Royal Lodge Stakes with Al Jadeed.

In 2003, he won the July Cup and the Nunthorpe Stakes with Oasis Dream.

=== 2005: Nannina, Playful Act and the move to Clarehaven ===
The 2005 season started well for Gosden. He won the Magnolia Stakes with Day Flight. Frankie Dettori, riding second, had carried them both across the course in the straight. "You wouldn't think he used to work for me!", Gosden joked.

Later, Karen's Caper won the Nell Gwyn Stakes. "She really enjoyed coming up the rising ground and is crying out for a mile", Gosden said afterwards. He also won the John Porter Stakes with Day Flight, and the Sunderlands Bookmakers Conditions Stakes with Plea Bargain. Day Flight won again, this time in the Ormonde Stakes.

Gosden then won the King Edward VII Stakes at Royal Ascot at York with Plea Bargain. "He's a lovely improving horse and the mile and a half is no problem", said Gosden. Playful Act won again, this time in the Lancashire Oaks. "It's been a long road back, but it's been worth it", said Gosden after the race. Playful Act would go on to be considered one of the finest broodmares in recent history.

He later won the Prestige Stakes with Nannina. "She'll improve a lot", said Gosden. Nannina then won the very prestigious Fillies' Mile at Ascot. "They set a proper pace and Kieran had Jimmy in the box, but he wasn't going to go there and she was well ridden", he said afterwards.

He then won the Royal Lodge Stakes at Ascot with Leo. Later, Gosden announced his decision to return to Newmarket to train at Clarehaven Stables. "The move to Manton was challenging, but I was pleased to win the 1,000 Guineas with Lahan within four months of being there", said Gosden,"She was our 100th Group winner in Europe". Explaining his decision, he said "I was in danger of being like my hero Bob Dylan, permanently on the road".

== Clarehaven Stables ==
=== 2006–2010: Establishing Clarehaven ===
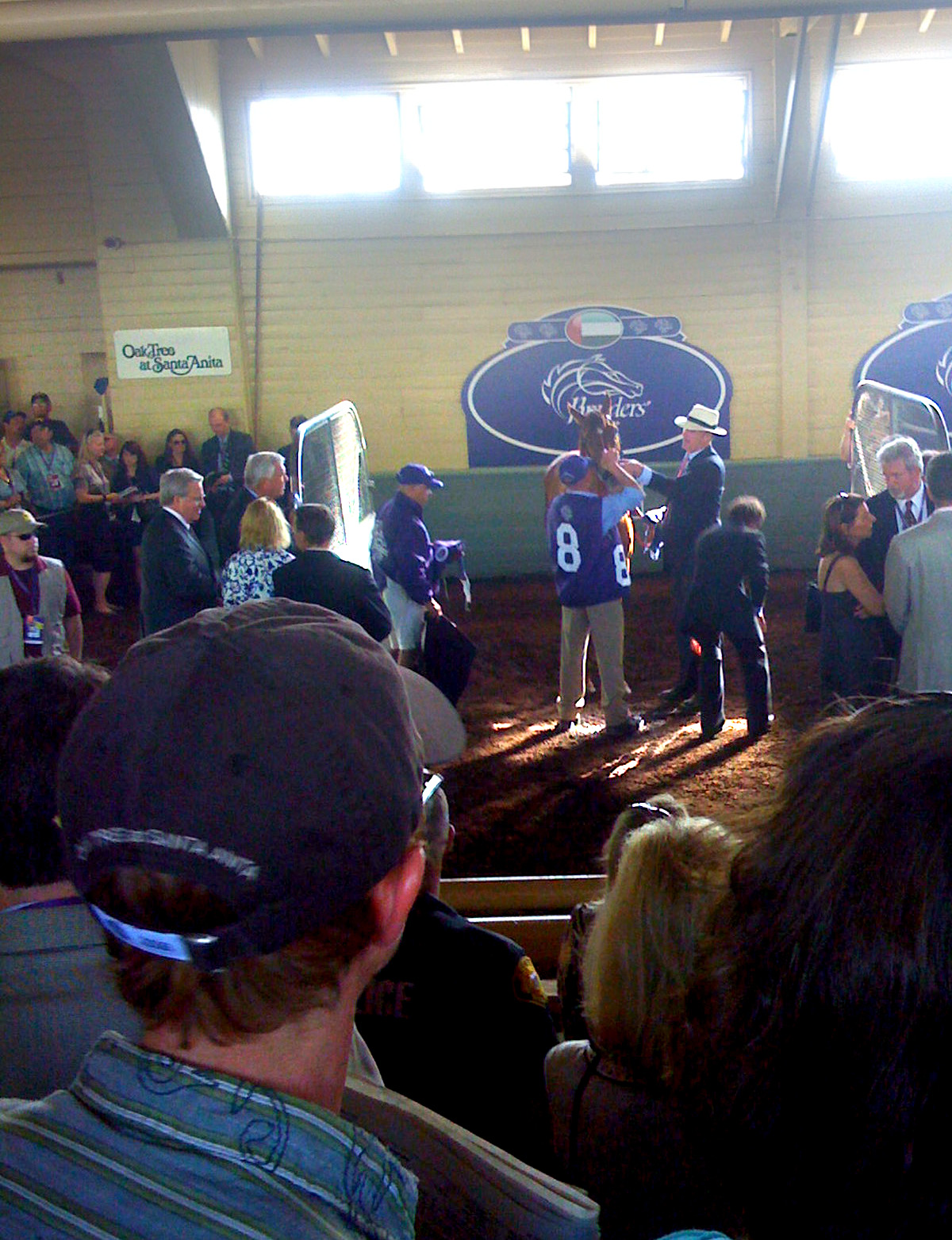
John Gosden saddling Raven's Pass before the 2008 Breeders' Cup Classic

==== 2006–2007: Nannina, Lucarno's St Leger and Raven's Pass emerging ====
Gosden's first season at Clarehaven was successful. He won prestigious races including the Coronation Stakes at Royal Ascot with Nannina.

The 2007 season started well for Gosden, but it became even better as he won the Royal Hunt Cup at Royal Ascot with Royal Oath. After the race, the Racing Post crowned him "Royal Ascot's 'Mr. Reliable'". He also won the Windsor Forest Stakes at Royal Ascot with Nannina. It was the second time she had won at Royal Ascot. "She seems to find her best form at this course and it was a great training performance", said winning jockey Jimmy Fortune,"All I had to do was steer".

He also won with Raven's Pass, who was becoming widely regarded as a promising horse. He then won the Great Voltigeur Stakes with Lucarno. "The Leger could be the place to go", said Gosden speaking of Lucarno afterwards,"He's got a big stride and knows how to use it". He then won the Solario Stakes with Raven's Pass, breaking the track record. "I think he's a good horse and I like him a lot", said Gosden afterwards, comparing him favourably to two other horses he'd won the race with, Foss Way and Windsor Knot.

Amidst much anticipation, Gosden took Lucarno to Doncaster, and won the very prestigious St. Leger Stakes. "He is a really, really good horse but was a little immature as a two-year-old, which is why he didn't run", said Gosden afterwards,"He worked well in the autumn last year and has run nothing but fabulous races all year". "He showed talent last year but I wanted to save him", Gosden also said, "He's done nothing but improve all season".

==== 2008: The Breeders' Cup Classic and Juvenile Turf double at Santa Anita ====
The 2008 season was an excellent one for Gosden. On the key Guineas trial day, he won four of the day's races with Infallible winning the prestigious Nell Gwyn Stakes, along with Virtual, Prohibit and Pampas Cat. Gosden then won his fourth Sandown Classic Trial with Centennial. Soon after, Michita won the Ribblesdale Stakes and Lucarno, winner of the 2007 St. Leger, won again in the Princess of Wales Stakes. He had another double at Newmarket with Upton Grey and Rainbow View. "She has a high cruising speed and looks like she has some class", said Gosden. Next, Gosden won the York Stakes with Pipedreamer, beating Campanologist. Racer Forever also won the Criterion Stakes for Gosden and Fortune. A successful season continued as Rainbow View won the prestigious Sweet Solera Stakes.

Gosden then won two major races in the same day, the Celebration Mile with Raven's Pass the Great Voltigeur Stakes with Centennial. He then enjoyed more success in the May Hill Stakes at Doncaster with Rainbow View, who continued her unbeaten run. "She has done it very well and I couldn't be more pleased with her", he said. He then won the Prix Minerve-Shadwell in France with Dar Re Mi, even though the ground was considered to reduce her prospects, "she would appreciate good going the most" Gosden said.

He then had another stunning day at Ascot, winning the showpiece Queen Elizabeth II Stakes with Raven's Pass and the Fillies' Mile with Rainbow View, completing the double for the second time. "We had three plans going in and got down to one in the end", said Gosden. Of Rainbow View he said "I didn't train her for a test of stamina, be she's all heart and tough as well". Winning the Timform Million with Donativum allowed Gosden to supplement the two-year-old for the Breeders' Cup Juvenile Turf at Santa Anita. He continued a great season by winning the Cambridgeshire with Tazeez.

At Santa Anita Park in Los Angeles, one of the tracks on which Gosden had started his training career, he won two of the world's most prestigious races, the Breeders' Cup Juvenile Turf with Donativum and the Breeders' Cup Classic with Raven's Pass. Gosden described it as "a day I will cherish".

==== 2009–2010: William Buick, Dar Re Mi and Arctic Cosmos's St Leger ====
Gosden's 2009 season began well. He won the Kentucky Derby Challenge with Mafaz, and the Lincoln Handicap with Expresso Star. Then Neeham won the valuable 3-Y-O Trophy at Newmarket. "I really do like these sales races", Gosden said "and Donativum's defeat of Crowed House last year turned out to be a cracker". He then won the Earl of Sefton Stakes with Tazeez, for the same owner.

He then won the Jockey Club Stakes with Bronze Cannon, and had a double with Cadre and Ithbaat. He then won the prestigious Lockinge Stakes with Virtual, beating Alexandros. "It was a fabulous finish", said Gosden, "Twice Over and Pressing took the pace to test Paco Boy's stamina and it played into our favour. He had his head down when it mattered".

He then won the Hardwicke Stakes at Royal Ascot with Bronze Cannon. The horse, known as 'The Mighty Mouse' for his small stature, beat Campanologist. He then won the Pretty Polly Stakes with Dar Re Mi. "She stays well and wants a mile and a half, but luckily we got control" said Fortune, the winning jockey. Showcasing also won well. Gosden also won the Prix Eugène Adam in France with Debussy. Later, Showcasing won the Gimcrack Stakes. "He is very much like his father and has bags of speed", said Gosden.

There was more success for Gosden with Dar Re Mi as she won the Yorkshire Oaks, beating Sariska. He then won the Washington Singer Stakes with Azmeel, and the prestigious Matron Stakes with Rainbow View. Gosden was happy with the performance, "She did it well today and, similar to some good fillies I've had before, she has just taken some time to come herself this season". He also won the Prix Dollar in France.

In November, Gosden returned to more success at Santa Anita, winning the Breeders' Cup Juvenile Turf with Pounced, for the second time in as many years. "It feels good to life this prize for the second year at Santa Anita, which I regard as my second home after spending so many years here as a young trainer", Gosden said. He also won the November Handicap with Charm School.

In early 2010, Gosden signed young jockey William Buick to ride for his stable. The decision was widely questioned, Buick was relatively untested at the highest level and Jimmy Fortune was widely regarded as a competent and effective jockey. However, Gosden is widely viewed as a good judge, the only other rider he has ever retained (apart from Buick) is Frankie Dettori. "I didn't have a retainer and there has been no falling out", said Fortune, who still often rides for Gosden when Buick is not available.

Almost immediately, Gosden's choice was proved correct as Buick gave Dar Re Mi a fantastic ride to win the prestigious Dubai Sheema Classic. "She was given a beautiful ride by William Buick", said Gosden, "He knows what he is doing and he has a lot of brains". He also talked of the difficulties of training in winter, "Keeping her warm in England wasn't easy, so it was quite a challenge".

Gosden continued his success, winning the Cheshire Oaks with Gertrude Bell and the Huxley Stakes with Debussy. He also won the Oaks Trial Stakes with Dyna Waltz, beating Timepiece. He also won the Queen Mary Stakes at Royal Ascot with Maqaasid. Gosden was delighted, "You have got a tailwind but she ran great". He also won the Summer Vase at Goodwood with Beachfire. It was the third time Gosden had won the race.

Gosden then won the Arlington Million with Debussy, beating Gio Ponti. Buick delivered a fantastic ride. "He rides cleverly", said Gosden, "He doesn't panic in a race". He also won the Doncaster Cup with Samuel.

In September, Gosden won his third St. Leger when Arctic Cosmos beat Midas Touch and Rewilding. "This is the most fantastic experience for me" said winning owner Robin Geffen after another excellent ride from Buick. Soon after, Gosden and Buick won the Prix Foy in France with Duncan. He then won four races in quick succession, with The Shrew, Utley, Treasury Devil and Masked Marvel.

=== 2011–2015: Continued success ===
==== 2011–2012: Champion Trainer, Nathaniel and Masked Marvel ====
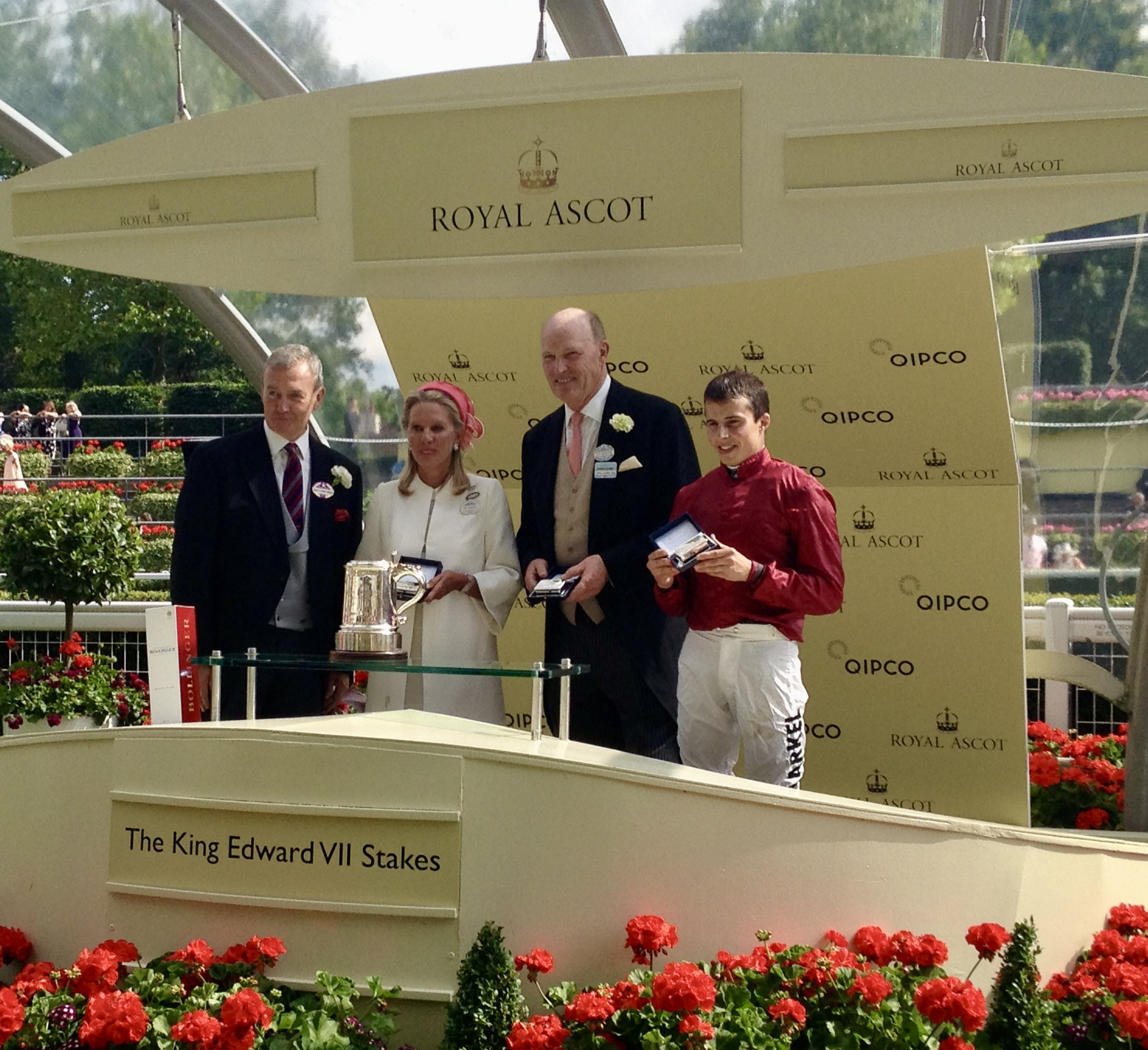
John Gosden after winning the King Edward VII Stakes at Royal Ascot

Gosden's 2011 season continued with more success as Gertrude Bell won the Warwick Fillies' Stakes and Investissement won the ToteScoop6 Handicap at Goodwood. He also won the prestigious Musidora Stakes with Jovality. He then won the Yorkshire Cup with Duncan, with another excellent ride from William Buick. Gosden described Duncan as "an enigmatic character" with "a ton of talent". He then won the prestigious King Edward VII Stakes at Royal Ascot with Nathaniel. He also won the Wolferton Handicap at Royal Ascot with Beachfire. "We put the headgear on him and it worked well", Gosden explained.

Soon after, he returned to Ascot with Nathaniel to win one of the world's most prestigious races, the King George VI and Queen Elizabeth Stakes. Gosden had let Buick judge the race and did not give his rider many instructions. Nathaniel came to the front and then eased away. "This horse is getting better and better", said Buick after the race. Gosden also won the Summer Double First Leg International with Bronze Prince, and the Canisbay Bloodstock Handicap with Aiken. He had more success in France, as Elusive Kate won again in the Prix du Calvados at Deauville.

Gosden won his fourth St. Leger and second with William Buick as Masked Marvel very impressively beat Brown Panther. After the fantastic performance Gosden said "From the day I saw him as a yearling I thought he was a Leger type". "He was a powerful little guy even then and he's got a great pedigree for the job". Very soon after, Gosden also won the Irish St. Leger with Duncan. Gosden then enjoyed further success when Elusive Kate won the very prestigious Prix Marcel Boussac at Longchamp, beating a fantastic field including Fire Lily and Zantenda.

Gosden's 2012 season has been one of his most successful. He won the Earl of Sefton Stakes with Questioning and the Musidora Stakes with The Fugue. At Royal Ascot, he was Champion Trainer, winning the Windsor Forest Stakes with Joviality and the Albany Stakes with Newfangled. He then won the Coronation Stakes at Royal Ascot with Fallen For You, the Wolverton Stakes with Gatewood, and the Duke of Edinburgh Stakes with Camborne.

He also won the Pretty Polly Stakes with Izzi Top. He then won three races in quick succession for Serena Rothschild, the Coral Challenge with Trade Commissioner, the Lancashire Oaks with Great Heavens and the Eclipse with Nathaniel. He also won the Bahrain Trophy with Shantaram. He also won the Prix Rothschild with Elusive Kate, and the Irish Oaks with Great Heavens.

He then won the Nassau Stakes with The Fugue. He also won the Great Voltigeur Stakes with Thought Worthy. In October, Gosden won the Tattersalls Millions Trophy with Ghurair, and the Geelong Cup with Gatewood. Gosden was British Champion Trainer in 2012.

==== 2013–2014: Kingman and Taghrooda ====
Gosden won six Group One races, and over 100 other races in 2013. He won the Falmouth Stakes with Elusive Kate, the Nassau Stakes with Winsili and the Yorkshire Oaks with The Fugue. Elusive Kate also won the Prix Rothschild, The Fugue won the Irish Champion Stakes, and Seek Again won the Hollywood Derby. Gosden was British Champions Series champion trainer in 2013.

Gosden won eight Group One races in 2014, including the Irish 2,000 Guineas with Kingman and The Oaks with Taghrooda. Kingman also won the St. James's Palace Stakes, the Sussex Stakes and the Prix Jacques Le Marois. He also won the Prince of Wales's Stakes with The Fugue, the King George VI and Queen Elizabeth Stakes with Taghrooda and the Nassau Stakes with Sultanina. In November 2014, Kingman won the Cartier Award for Cartier Horse of the Year and Cartier Champion Three-year-old Colt. Taghrooda won the award for Cartier Champion Three-year-old Filly.

==== 2015: Golden Horn and the Arc ====
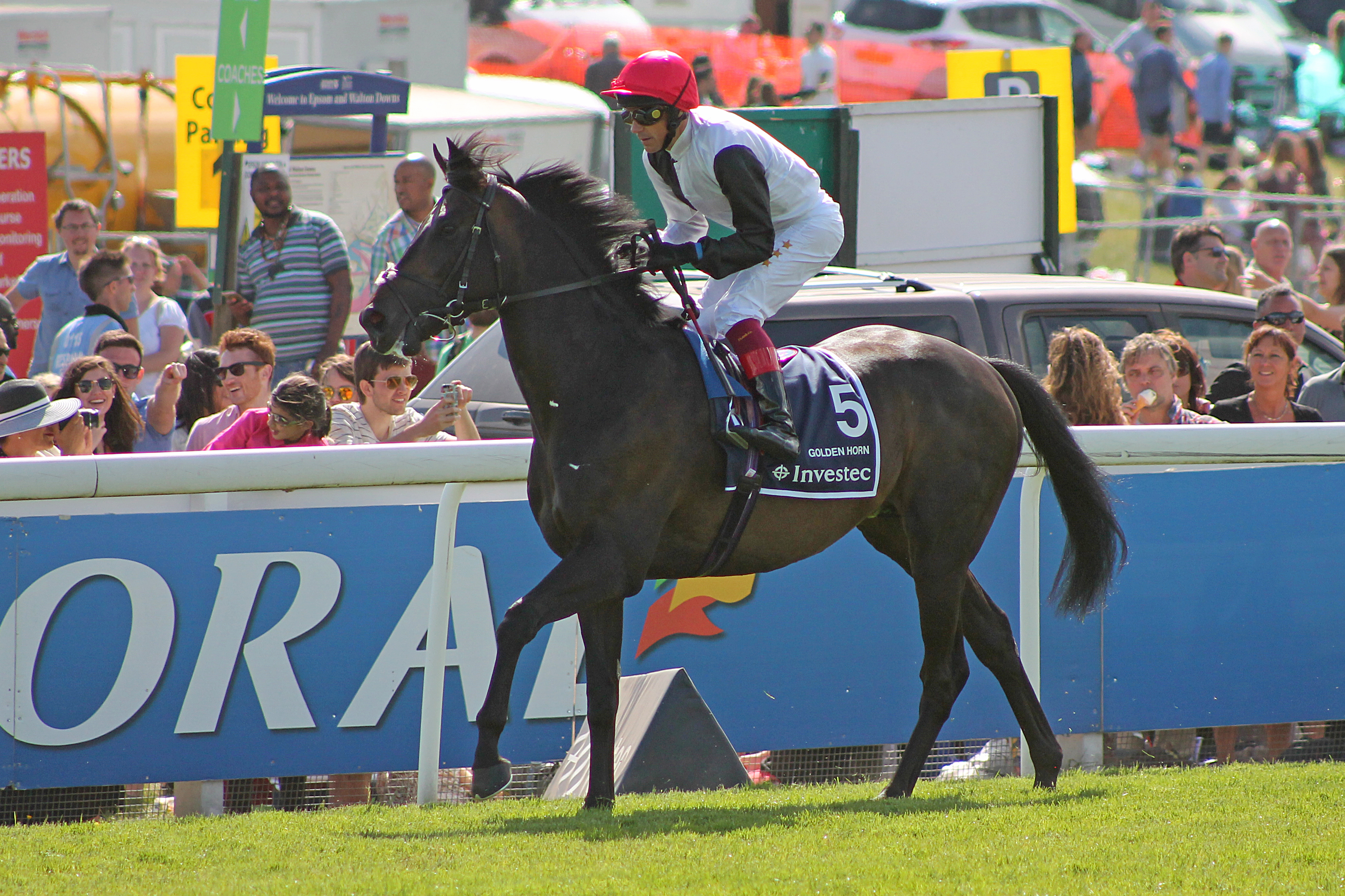
Golden Horn and Frankie Dettori going to post in the Derby

Gosden's 2015 season saw him become Champion Trainer again, with Golden Horn and Jack Hobbs generally considered his best horses of the season. He won the Derby and the Eclipse with Golden Horn, the Prix Morny and the Middle Park Stakes with Shalaa, and the Prix de Diane with Star of Seville. He also won the Irish Derby with Jack Hobbs, after the horse had finished second in the Epsom Derby behind Golden Horn. Later in the season, Golden Horn won the Irish Champion Stakes and the Prix de l'Arc de Triomphe. "Today you saw the real Golden Horn", said jockey Frankie Dettori. "He put to bed a great Arc field like a true champion. Over the last furlong and a half it would have been impossible for any horse to get near me. I pressed the button and he flew. Think of the horses he has beaten and beaten well. I spent the last furlong enjoying myself. He has given me some tremendous pleasure and is probably the best horse that I've ridden."

=== 2016–2020: The Enable era ===
==== 2016: Cracksman, Stradivarius and Enable debut ====
Gosden finished second in the 2016 Trainer's championship winning the Nell Gwyn Stakes with Nathra, the John Guest Bengough Stakes with Shalaa, the Flying Childers Stakes with Ardad and the Hungerford Stakes with Richard Pankhurst. He also won the Lillie Langtry Stakes with California, The Dante Stakes with Wings of Desire, the Tattersalls Musidora Stakes with So Mi Dar, The Tattersalls Millions 3-Y-O Trophy with Linguistic and the Earl of Sefton Stakes with Mahsoob. He also won the British Champions Fillies' and Mares' Stakes with Journey at Ascot on British Champions Day.

One notable development of 2016 was the debut of several juveniles in the autumn. Cracksman, Stradivarius and Enable all ran for the first time that season, each winning their sole start as two-year-olds and giving little external indication of the extraordinary careers that lay ahead. Their arrival coincide with a period of major achievements for Gosden's training career. On British Champions Day at Ascot in October, Gosden won the British Champions Fillies' and Mares' Stakes with Journey, providing a Group One highlight at the end of the season.

==== 2017: Enable's first Arc and Cracksman's Champion Stakes ====
The 2017 season was defined above all else by Enable, a daughter of Nathaniel trained for Juddmonte Farms. She reeled off successive wins in the Cheshire Oaks, Oaks, Irish Oaks, King George VI and Queen Elizabeth Stakes, Yorkshire Oaks and Prix de l'Arc de Triomphe. Her Oaks victory at Epsom, achieved in record time during a thunderstorm, announced her as an exceptional talent, and she subsequently dominated her rivals in each of the five races that followed, culminating in a first Arc triumph at Chantilly under Frankie Dettori.

Alongside Enable, Cracksman emerged as one of the most exciting middle-distance horses in Europe. Having placed in both the Epsom Derby and the Irish Derby, he stepped up dramatically to win the Champion Stakes at Ascot on Champions Day, routing a high-class field. Gosden chose to swerve the Arc with Cracksman, allowing Enable to take her chance in France while Cracksman headed to Ascot, where his dominant performance reminded many observers of his sire Frankel's own victory in the same race. Stradivarius, the other autumn debutant of 2016, won his first Group One in the Goodwood Cup during the summer. The season as a whole represented the emergence of what would become arguably the finest collection of horses Gosden had trained simultaneously at any point in his career, with Enable, Cracksman and Stradivarius all unbeaten at the end of their respective campaigns.

==== 2018: Champion Trainer, Second Arc and Breeders' Cup Turf ====
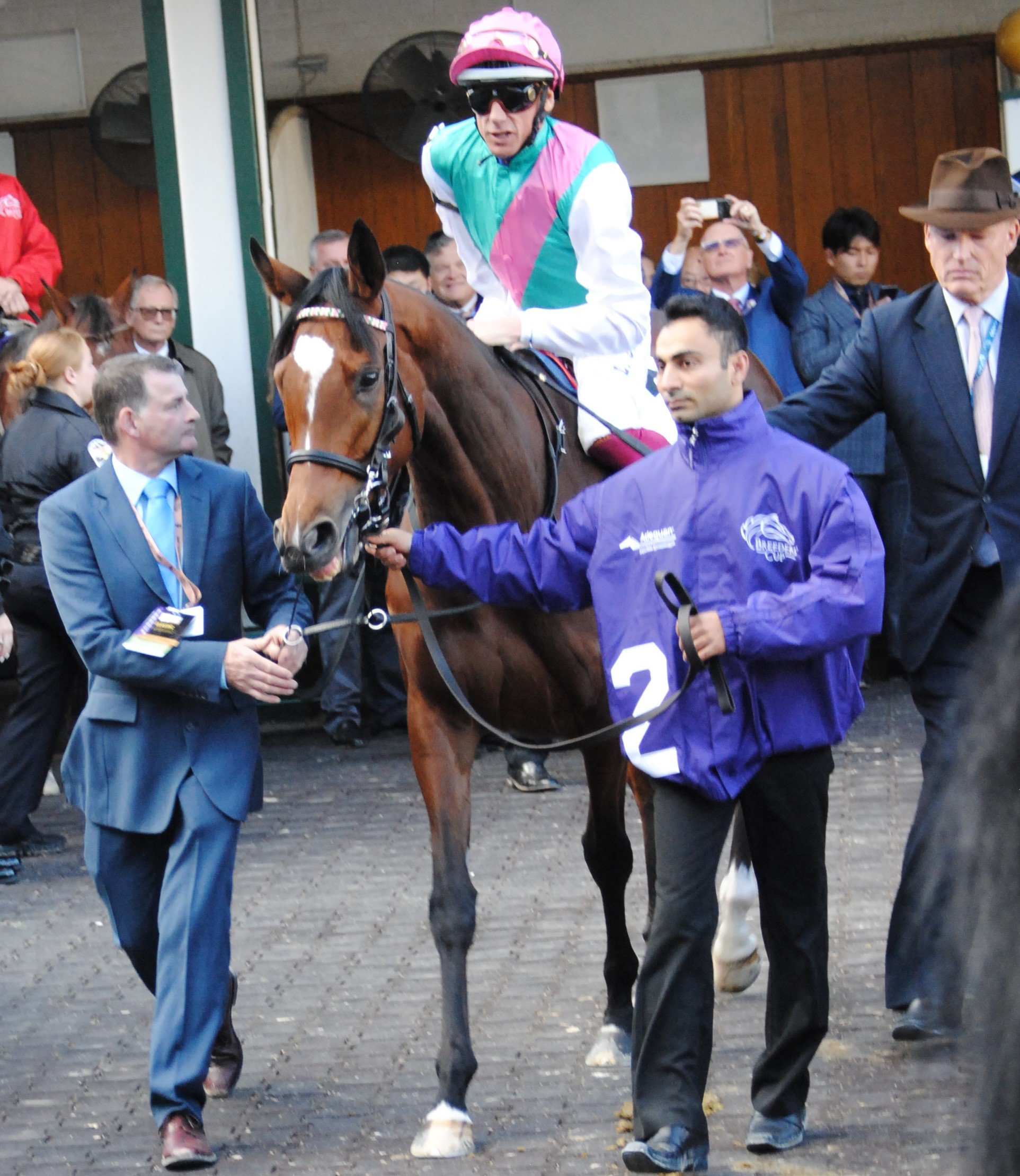
Gosden with Enable at the 2018 Breeders' Cup

Gosden saddled 162 winners from 647 runners in Britain at a strike rate of 25% in 2018, to become Champion Trainer for the third time. Enable returned from an injury-disrupted campaign to win a second Prix de l'Arc de Triomphe, having also taken the Breeders' Cup Turf at Churchill Downs - becoming the first horse to complete that extraordinary double in the same year.< Cracksman added the Coronation Cup at Epsom before a second dominant Champion Stakes victory at Ascot, again in the style of his sire Frankel.

Roaring Lion developed from a three-year-old to become a leading miler of his generation. His five victories included the Coral-Eclipse at Sandown, the Juddmonte International at York and the QIPCO Irish Champion Stakes at Leopardstown, and he was named Cartier Horse of the Year. Stradivarius, meanwhile, dominated the staying division throughout, winning the Ascot Gold Cup, Goodwood Cup, Yorkshire Cup and Lonsdale Cup. His achievement in winning those four races landed the inaugural Weatherbys Hamilton Stayers' Million bonus for his connections. The Cartier Awards ceremony that autumn reflected the stable's depth, with Roaring Lion, Enable, Stradivarius and Too Darn Hot all winning divisional prizes. Too Darn Hot, a son of Dubawi out of Gosden's own previous charge Dar Re Mi, won the Dewhurst Stakes unbeaten as a juvenile to earn the Cartier Two-Year-Old Colt award, and headed into winter as a short-priced favourite for the following season's 2,000 Guineas. Champions Day at Ascot in October was particularly successful, with Cracksman, Roaring Lion and Stradivarius all winning Group One races on the same afternoon.

==== 2019: Three Classics, Stradivarius and Enable's near-miss ====
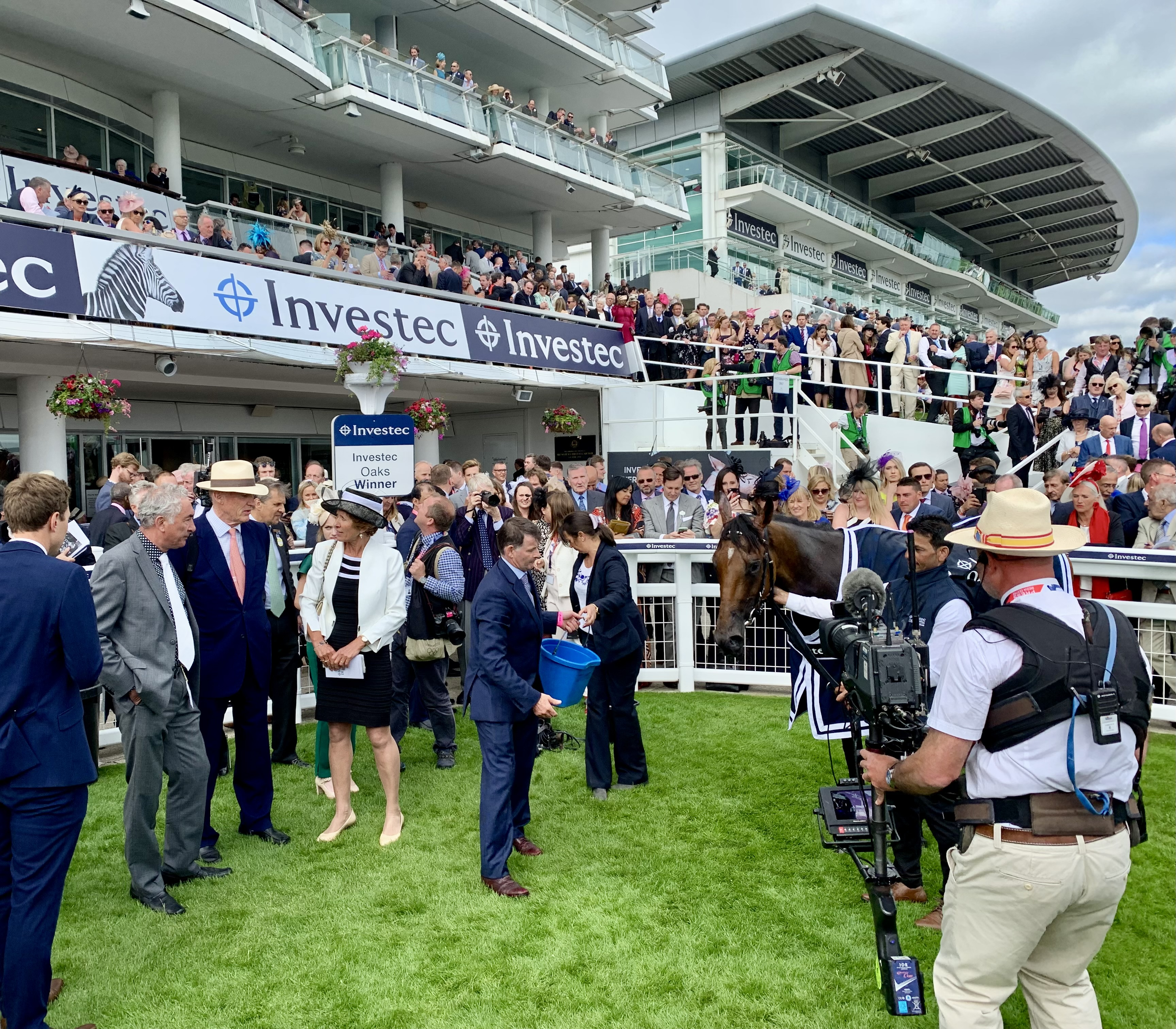
John Gosden after winning the Epsom Oaks with Anapurna

Enable returned for her much-anticipated fifth season, winning the Coral-Eclipse, a second King George VI and Queen Elizabeth Stakes and a second Yorkshire Oaks before a narrow defeat in her bid for a historic third consecutive Arc, going down by a short margin to Waldgeist in the closing stages at Longchamp. Stradivarius again swept the staying division, landing his second Stayers' Million courtesy of repeat victories in the Yorkshire Cup, Ascot Gold Cup, Goodwood Cup and Lonsdale Cup.

Gosden won three classics in 2019. Anapurna won the Oaks before Star Catcher registered the first of her three Group One wins in the Irish Oaks. Logician provided Gosden with a fifth win in the St Leger, and Star Catcher went on to add the Prix Vermeille and the British Champions Fillies' and Mares' Stakes, making her one of the most prolific Group One winners of the season. Too Darn Hot, though frustratingly interrupted by injury and unable to contest the Guineas, still managed to win the Prix Jean Prat and the Sussex Stakes At the Cartier Awards, Enable was named Horse of the Year for the second time, with Stradivarius taking the stayers' prize for a second successive year and Too Darn Hot recognised as Champion Three-year-old Colt. The season confirmed Gosden as the dominant force in British flat racing, with a depth of talent across age groups and distances that no other British trainer could match. He retained the trainers' championship for a second consecutive year.

==== 2020: Enable's record King George ====
The 2020 flat season was significantly disrupted by the Covid-19 pandemic, with racing suspended from late March until June and subsequently conducted without spectators. Gosden nevertheless retained his champion trainer title for a third successive year, his stable depth and the quality of his established horses proving decisive in a condensed season. Among his 149 winners, he enjoyed seven British Group One triumphs including Enable's record third King George VI and Queen Elizabeth Stakes and Stradivarius's third successive Ascot Gold Cup and fourth Goodwood Cup.

Enable's King George VI and Queen Elizabeth Stakes victory — her third in the race and the first horse to achieve such a feat — was a particular highlight of the restricted season. She subsequently attempted an unprecedented third consecutive Arc, but finished sixth in testing heavy ground at Longchamp and was retired at the end of the campaign after a career spanning 19 races and 11 Group One victories. Nazeef added two further Group One wins for the stable in the Falmouth Stakes and the Sun Chariot Stakes, racing for the powerful Hamdan Al Maktoum operation. Palace Pier, a son of Kingman, won the St James's Palace Stakes at Royal Ascot and the Prix Jacques Le Marois to signal himself as a potential top-class miler for the season ahead. Stradivarius won a third consecutive Ascot Gold Cup to join Sagaro and Yeats in a small group of horses to have achieved that feat, and also secured a fourth Goodwood Cup.

=== 2021–present: Partnership with Thady Gosden ===
==== 2021–2022: Mishriff, Palace Pier and Inspiral ====
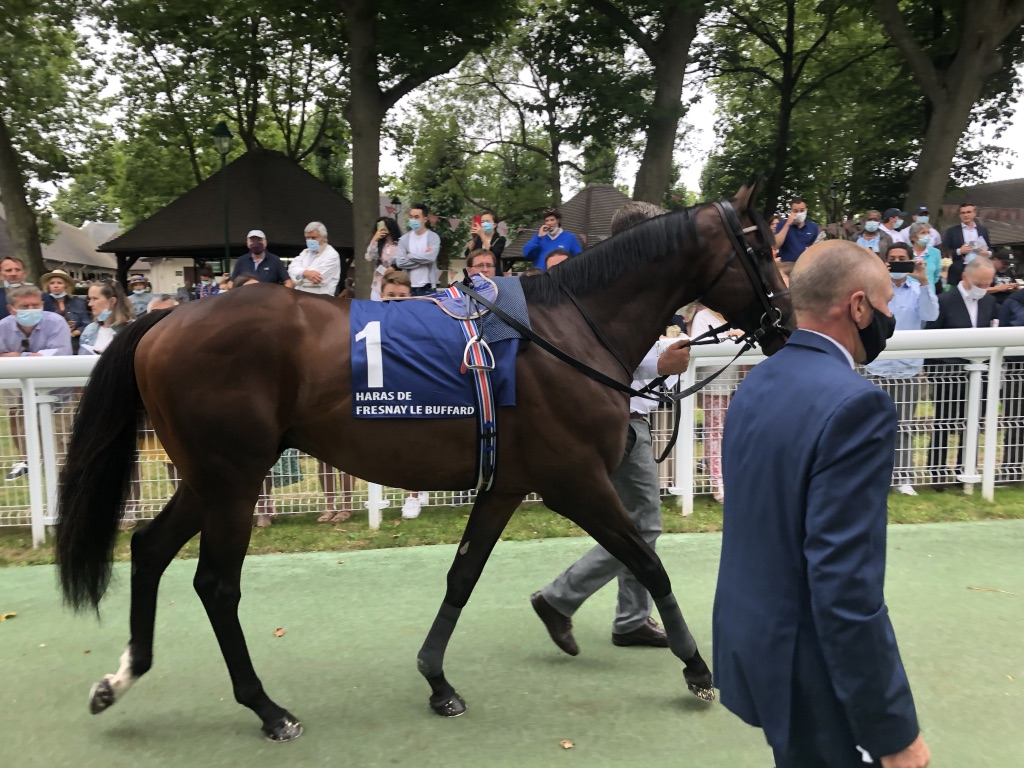
Palace Pier before winning the Prix Jacques Le Marois at Deauville

Gosden announced he would begin training with his son in March 2021. the pair won the world's most valuable race, the Saudi Cup, followed by the Dubai Turf and the Sheema Classic, all within just over a month. The Saudi Cup was won by Mishriff, a son of Make Believe, who had already won the 2020 Prix du Jockey Club in France. Lord North secured victory in the Dubai Turf, defeating Panthalassa by three lengths under Frankie Dettori, while stablemate Mishriff triumphed in the Dubai Sheema Classic only a few minutes later, edging out Love in a dramatic finish.

Domestically, Palace Pier emerged as one of the finest milers in Europe, winning the Lockinge Stakes, the Queen Anne Stakes at Royal Ascot and the Prix Jacques le Marois at Deauville. The joint licence's first British Group One success came with Mishriff's dominant victory in the Juddmonte International Stakes at York in August, where the four-year-old held off a strong field by six lengths. The stable also produced an outstanding juvenile in Inspiral, a daughter of Frankel owned by Cheveley Park Stud, who won the Fillies' Mile at Newmarket, earning the Cartier Two-Year-Old Filly award.

In their first full season, they recorded 133 winners from 651 runners. The combination of Mishriff's global campaign, Palace Pier's miling ability and Inspiral's juvenile promise gave the new partnership a platform.

Inspiral, already unbeaten from four juvenile starts, stepped up to become a leading Classic filly in the 2022 season, winning the Coronation Stakes at Royal Ascot in convincing fashion and the Prix Jacques le Marois at Deauville, confirming her as one of the best milers in Europe. Emily Upjohn, a daughter of Sea The Stars, had a dramatic Oaks at Epsom where she was narrowly beaten having missed the break, but went on to win the British Champions Fillies' and Mares' Stakes on Champions Day at Ascot.

Nashwa, a Frankel filly bred and owned by Imad Al Sagar, proved the revelation of the season for the Classic generation. Nashwa provided a landmark win in the Prix de Diane at Chantilly, marking the first success for a female jockey in the race. She went on to win the Nassau Stakes at Goodwood, making her one of the most versatile and progressive three-year-old fillies in Europe. Lord North continued his successful international career, winning the Dubai Turf for a second time, while Commissioning won the Fillies' Mile at Newmarket to emerge as a leading juvenile filly for the following season.

Internationally the stable continued to travel horses widely and successfully, with winners in Dubai, France and the United States supplementing a strong domestic campaign. The emerging rivalry between Inspiral and the best milers in Europe suggested the stable had a genuine force at that distance for several seasons to come. The year also marked the first appearances of Courage Mon Ami, a Frankel-sired stayer who would develop into one of the most popular horses in training over the following two seasons.

==== 2023: Champion Trainer, Soul Sister and Inspiral's Breeders' Cup ====
Gosden became Champion Trainer again in 2023, with highlights including Classic success in the Oaks with Soul Sister at Epsom in June and notable victories at Royal Ascot with Courage Mon Ami in the Ascot Gold Cup and Mostahdaf in the Prince of Wales's Stakes. Soul Sister's Oaks victory was particularly poignant as it provided Frankie Dettori, in his final season riding in Europe, with his last British Classic winner. Courage Mon Ami's Gold Cup triumph, ridden by Dettori, was also a highlight of the Royal Ascot meeting and proved a decisive race in the championship.

Mostahdaf was responsible for their biggest domestic payday, scooping the prize for his Juddmonte International victory at York in August. Internationally, the stable won big races in Qatar, Saudi Arabia, Dubai, France and the United States, with Inspiral capping a memorable year in the Breeders' Cup Filly and Mare Turf at Santa Anita. Inspiral also won the Sun Chariot Stakes at Newmarket in October, her sixth Group One victory, cementing her status as the leading older miler in Europe. The championship was confirmed when Trawlerman won the Long Distance Cup on Champions Day at Ascot.

==== 2024–present: Friendly Soul, Field Of Gold and Ombudsman ====
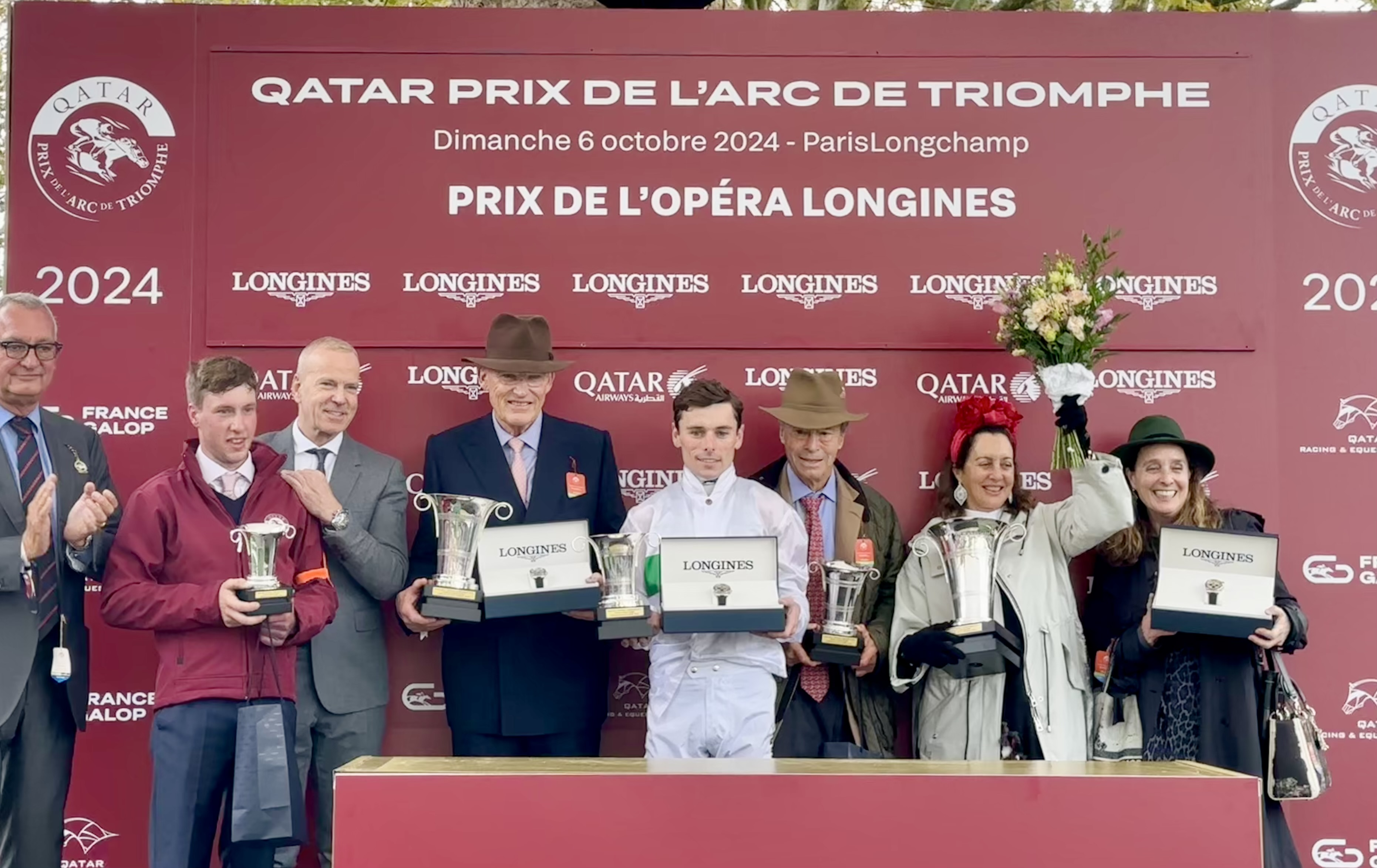
John Gosden after winning the Prix de l'Opera Longines 2024 at ParisLonchamp

Gosden's 2024 season started well in May at Newbury when Audience, a rank outsider, produced one of the shocks of the season by winning the Lockinge Stakes, recording a rating of 123, ranking him among the leading milers of the season. Gosden enjoyed further success at Royal Ascot, including with Trawlerman in Ascot Gold Cup. Internationally, the stable continued its strong presence in France when Friendly Soul, a daughter of Kingman trained for George Strawbridge. Friendly Soul was a shining light for the yard, winning four of her five starts across the season.

Kieran Shoemark's wait for a first Group One as stable jockey came to an end as he delivered Friendly Soul for a hard-fought victory in the Prix de l'Opera in Paris in October, leading home a Gosden one-two as stablemate Running Lion took second. The emergence of Lead Artist, a promising Dubawi colt who won at Group Three level at Goodwood.

The 2025 season saw Gosden enjoy a brilliant Royal Ascot meeting in June, finishing the week with five winners and edging out Aidan O'Brien to top the trainers' standings at the Royal meeting. The week was lit up by three Group One victories across its first three days. Field Of Gold, a son of Kingman, won the St James's Palace Stakes in electric fashion on the opening day, and Ombudsman — a Night of Thunder colt trained for Godolphin — followed up with victory in the Prince of Wales's Stakes on day two despite a troubled run through the field. Trawlerman, a veteran seven-year-old by Golden Horn, then completed the treble with an emphatic Gold Cup win on day three, going one better than his second place to the great Kyprios twelve months earlier. Field Of Gold then went on to win the Irish 2,000 Guineas at the Curragh, blasting clear by three and three-quarter lengths, confirming him as one of the leading milers in Europe.

Gosden's season started well in 2026 with Ombudsman winning the Dubai Turf at Meydan.

=== Royal colours ===
Gosden has enjoyed notable success training horses for Queen Elizabeth II, King Charles III and Queen Camilla.

One of the most prominent royal horses Gosden trained was Reach For The Moon. The colt won a maiden race at Newbury in July 2021 before recording an impressive victory in the Group 3 Solario Stakes at Sandown Park the following month. His performances made him one of the Queen's most exciting late-career prospects.

He also trained Wakening, another winner for Queen Elizabeth II. The filly won the Newcomers Maiden Fillies' Stakes at Newmarket in August 2020, ridden by Robert Havlin. Gosden trained 13 winners for the Queen.

Gosden also trained Portcullis, bred by King Charles III and raced by the King and Queen, to win the Wood Ditton Maiden Stakes at Newmarket on his racecourse debut. The victory attracted favourable attention because of the colt's royal breeding and the historic significance of the race as a traditional Newmarket maiden for promising three-year-olds.

== Major wins ==
(United Kingdom) Great Britain

- 1000 Guineas – (1) – Lahan (2000)
- Ascot Gold Cup – (5) – Stradivarius (2018, 2019, 2020), Courage Mon Ami (2023), Trawlerman (2025)
- British Champions Fillies' and Mares' Stakes – (3) – Journey (2016), Star Catcher (2019), Emily Upjohn (2022)
- British Champions Long Distance Cup - (1) - Trawlerman (2025)
- Champion Stakes – (3) – Cracksman (2017, 2018), Ombudsman (2026)
- Cheveley Park Stakes – (1) – Prophecy (1993)
- Coronation Cup – (2) – Cracksman (2018), Emily Upjohn (2023)
- Coronation Stakes – (3) – Nannina (2006), Fallen For You (2012), Inspiral (2022)
- Dewhurst Stakes – (1) – Too Darn Hot (2018)
- Derby – (2) – Benny the Dip (1997), Golden Horn (2015)
- Eclipse Stakes – (4) – Nathaniel (2012), Golden Horn (2015), Roaring Lion (2018), Enable (2019)
- Falmouth Stakes – (4) – Ryafan (1997), Elusive Kate (2013), Nazeef (2020), Nashwa (2023)
- Fillies' Mile – (6) – Crystal Music (2000), Playful Act (2004), Nannina (2005), Rainbow View (2008), Inspiral (2021), Commissioning (2022)
- Golden Jubilee Stakes – (1) – Malhub (2002)
- Goodwood Cup – (5) – Sonus (1993), Stradivarius (2017, 2018, 2019, 2020)
- Haydock Sprint Cup – (1) – Wolfhound (1993)
- International Stakes – (4) – Roaring Lion (2018), Mishriff (2021), Mostahdaf (2023), Ombudsman (2025)
- July Cup – (1) – Oasis Dream (2003)
- King George VI and Queen Elizabeth Stakes – (5) – Nathaniel (2011), Taghrooda (2014), Enable (2017, 2019, 2020)
- Lockinge Stakes – (5) – Emperor Jones (1994), Virtual (2009), Palace Pier (2021), Audience (2024), Lead Artist (2025)
- Middle Park Stakes – (2) – Oasis Dream (2002), Shalaa (2015)
- Nassau Stakes – (5) – Ryafan (1997), The Fugue (2012), Winsili (2013), Sultanina (2014), Nashwa (2022)
- Nunthorpe Stakes – (1) – Oasis Dream (2003)
- Oaks Stakes – (4) – Taghrooda (2014), Enable (2017), Anapurna (2019), Soul Sister (2023)
- Prince of Wales's Stakes – (7) – Muhtarram (1994, 1995), The Fugue (2014), Lord North (2020), Mostahdaf (2023), Ombudsman (2025, 2026)
- Queen Anne Stakes - (1) - Palace Pier (2021)
- Queen Elizabeth II Stakes – (4) – Observatory (2000), Raven's Pass (2008), Persuasive (2017), Roaring Lion (2018)
- St. James's Palace Stakes – (4) – Kingman (2014), Without Parole (2018), Palace Pier (2020), Field Of Gold (2025)
- St. Leger – (5) – Shantou (1996), Lucarno (2007), Arctic Cosmos (2010), Masked Marvel (2011), Logician (2019)
- Sun Chariot Stakes – (3) – Ristna (1991), Nazeef (2020), Inspiral (2023)
- Sussex Stakes – (2) – Kingman (2014), Too Darn Hot (2019)
- Yorkshire Oaks – (4) – Dar Re Mi (2009), The Fugue (2013), Enable (2017), Enable (2019)

France

- Grand Prix de Saint-Cloud – (1) – Coronet (2019)
- Poule d'Essai des Pouliches – (2) – Valentine Waltz (1999), Zenda (2002)
- Prix de l'Abbaye de Longchamp – (1) – Keen Hunter (1991)
- Prix de l'Arc de Triomphe – (3) – Golden Horn (2015), Enable (2017, 2018)
- Prix de Diane – (2) – Star Of Seville (2015), Nashwa (2022)
- Prix de la Forêt – (2) – Wolfhound (1992), Mount Abu (2001)
- Prix de Royallieu – (3) – Annaba (1996), Anapurna (2019), Loving Dream (2021)
- Prix d'Ispahan – (1) – Observatory (2001)
- Prix du Jockey Club – (1) – Mishriff (2020)
- Prix Ganay – (1) – Cracksman (2018)
- Prix Jacques Le Marois – (5) – Kingman (2014), Palace Pier (2020, 2021), Inspiral (2022, 2023)
- Prix Jean Prat – (2) – Torrential (1995), Too Darn Hot (2019)
- Prix Jean Romanet – (2) – Izzi Top (2012), Coronet (2019)
- Prix Lupin – (1) – Flemensfirth (1995)
- Prix Marcel Boussac – (3) – Ryafan (1996), Sulk (2001), Elusive Kate (2011)
- Prix Maurice de Gheest – (1) – May Ball (2002)
- Prix Morny – (1) – Shalaa (2015)
- Prix de l'Opéra - (1) - Friendly Soul (2024), Miss Scott (2026)
- Prix Rothschild – (2) – Elusive Kate (2012, 2013)
- Prix de la Salamandre – (1) – Lord of Men (1995)
- Prix Vermeille – (1) – Star Catcher (2019)

Germany

- Grosser Preis von Baden – (1) – Mashaallah (1992)
- Preis der Diana – (1) – Miss Yoda (2020)

(Republic of Ireland) Ireland

- Irish 2,000 Guineas – (2) – Kingman (2014), Field Of Gold (2025)
- Irish Champion Stakes – (4) – Muhtarram (1993), The Fugue (2013), Golden Horn (2015), Roaring Lion (2018)
- Irish Derby – (1) – Jack Hobbs (2015)
- Irish Oaks – (3) – Great Heavens (2012), Enable (2017), Star Catcher (2019)
- Irish St. Leger – (2) – Mashaallah (1992), Duncan (dead heat 2011)
- Matron Stakes – (1) – Rainbow View (2009)
- Pretty Polly Stakes – (3) – Del Deya (1994), Dar Re Mi (2009), Izzi Top (2012)

Italy

- Gran Premio del Jockey Club – (1) – Shantou (1996)
- Gran Premio di Milano – (2) – Mashaallah (1992), Shantou (1997)
- Premio Presidente della Repubblica – (1) – Muhtarram (1994)
- Premio Roma – (2) – Knifebox (1993), Flemensfirth (1996)

Saudi Arabia

- Saudi Cup – (1) – Mishriff (2021)

United Arab Emirates

- Dubai Sheema Classic – (3) – Dar Re Mi (2010), Jack Hobbs (2017), Mishriff (2021)
- Dubai Turf - (4) - Lord North (2021,2022,2023), Ombudsman (2026)

United States

- Arlington Million – (1) – Debussy (2010)
- Beverly Hills Handicap – (2) – Absentia (1983), Royal Heroine (1984)
- Breeders' Cup Classic – (1) – Raven's Pass (2008)
- Breeders' Cup Filly & Mare Turf - (1) - Inspiral (2023)
- Breeders' Cup Juvenile Turf – (2) – Donativum (2008), Pounced (2009)
- Breeders' Cup Mile – (1) – Royal Heroine (1984)
- Breeders' Cup Turf – (1) – Enable (2018)
- Carleton F. Burke Handicap – (1) – Bel Bolide (1983)
- Clement L. Hirsch Turf Championship Stakes – (1) – Allez Milord (1987)
- Gamely Handicap – (1) – La Koumia (1986)
- Hollywood Derby – (2) – Royal Heroine (1983), Seek Again (2013)
- Hollywood Turf Cup – (3) – Alphabatim (1984, 1986), Zoffany (1985)
- Matriarch Stakes – (2) – Royal Heroine (1984), Asteroid Field (1987)
- Philip H. Iselin Handicap – (1) – Bates Motel (1983)
- Queen Elizabeth II Challenge Cup Stakes – (1) – Ryafan (1997)
- Ramona Handicap – (1) – Annoconnor (1988)
- San Antonio Handicap – (2) – Bates Motel (1983), Hatim (1986)
- San Luis Rey Handicap – (1) – Zoffany (1987)
- Santa Anita Handicap – (1) – Bates Motel (1983)
- Sunset Handicap – (1) – Zoffany (1986)
- Vanity Handicap – (1) – Annoconnor (1988)
- Yellow Ribbon Stakes – (2) – Bonne Ile (1986), Ryafan (1997)

== Personal life ==
Gosden is called "one of the sport's great communicators". His television interviews are often praised: "Gosden is Cary Grant in Ernie Els's body. He is the Big Easy with a sly smile, a wry wit, and a charismatic charm".

Gosden is a music fan, according to Ronnie Wood, guitarist for the Rolling Stones. "He knows his music history. He knows everything about Bob Dylan, followed by everything about the Stones. He knows all the words and everything", said Wood. Gosden also describes himself as "a Neil Young man", and said "I went to see him the other week at the Hammersmith Apollo and it was just wonderful".

Gosden has said of his position, "You have to move along gracefully if you can, and hopefully with a following wind, with common sense, a sense of reality, humility and a bit of history". His office is decorated with pictures of some of the most successful horses he has trained,"Paintings of champion horses – the filly Ryafan, last year's Breeders' Cup hero Raven's Pass – look down from the walls".

He was invited to ride in the King's procession at Royal Ascot 2023. He was appointed Officer of the Order of the British Empire (OBE) in the 2017 New Year Honours for services to horseracing and training.

== Charity work ==
Public records show he is a trustee or patron of charities including the Spinal Research Trust, formally the International Spinal Research Trust, the UK's leading charity funding research into spinal cord repair, and Horatio's Garden, a charity that creates therapeutic, accessible gardens within NHS spinal injury centres.

Gosden has also backed diversity and inclusion in British racing. At the 2020 launch of Racing with Pride — the official diversity network of British racing — he was among senior industry figures to lend public support, noting the diversity of his workforce.

Gosden has also supported local organisations in Newmarket, helping raise money for the Newmarket Housing Trust and Racing Welfare.

In May 2015, when Matt Hancock was Newmarket MP, Gosden donated £10,000 to the MP's office costs and £15,000 to the Conservative Party.
