= Zoffany (disambiguation) =

Johan Zoffany (1733–1810) was a German neoclassical painter, active mainly in England, Italy and India.

Zoffany may also refer to:

- Zoffany (American horse) (1980–1998), an American-bred Thoroughbred racehorse, active in the US and UK
- Zoffany (Irish-bred horse) (2008–2021), an Irish-bred Thoroughbred racehorse and sire
