= Malhub =

American-bred Thoroughbred racehorse

- Sire: Kingmambo
- Grandsire: Mr. Prospector
- Dam: Arjuzah
- Damsire: Ahonoora
- Sex: Stallion
- Foaled: 26 April 1998
- Country: United States
- Colour: Bay
- Breeder: Shadwell Farm
- Owner: Hamdan Al Maktoum
- Trainer: John Gosden
- Record: 12: 4–3–0
- Earnings: £289,519

Major wins
- King Charles II Stakes (2001); Golden Jubilee Stakes (2002)

Malhub (foaled 26 April 1998) was an American-bred, British-trained Thoroughbred racehorse. He is a son of Kingmambo and won the Golden Jubilee Stakes at Royal Ascot in 2002.

After retiring from racing, Malhub was sent to stallion duties in South Africa.
