= Royal Heroine =

Irish-bred Thoroughbred racehorse

- Sire: Lypheor
- Grandsire: Lyphard
- Dam: My Sierra Leone
- Damsire: Relko
- Sex: Mare
- Foaled: 1980
- Country: Ireland
- Colour: Dark Bay/Brown
- Breeder: B. Larry Ryan
- Owner: Robert Sangster
- Trainer: Mick Ryan (Europe); Sir Michael Stoute (Europe); John Gosden (United States)
- Record: 21: 10-5-1
- Earnings: $1,299,449 (equivalent)

Major wins
- Princess Margaret Stakes (1982); Child Stakes (1983); Prix de l'Opéra (1983); Beverly Hills Handicap (1984); Matriarch Stakes (1984); Inglewood Handicap (1984); Breeders' Cup wins: Breeders' Cup Mile (1984)

Awards
- American Champion Female Turf Horse (1984)

Honours
- US National Museum of Racing and Hall of Fame (2022); Grade II Royal Heroine Stakes at Santa Anita Park (1998–2005 & 2009– )
- Last updated on 6 August 2021

Royal Heroine (1980–2002) was a Hall of Fame Thoroughbred Champion racehorse foaled in Ireland who raced in England and France and then in the United States where she set a North American record for a mile on turf while winning the inaugural running of the Breeders' Cup Mile in 1984. Royal Heroine was inducted into the US National Museum of Racing and Hall of Fame in 2022.

== Background ==
Bred by Robert Ryan, Ballymorris Stud, Royal Heroine was out of the mare My Sierra Leone, a daughter of the 1963 Epsom Derby winner, Relko. Her sire, Lypheor, was a son of Lyphard who twice had been the Leading sire in France. Raced by one of the United Kingdom's most prominent horsemen, Robert Sangster, her trainers in Europe were Mick Ryan and Sir Michael Stoute.

== Racing career ==
=== Europe ===
Racing at age two, Royal Heroine won two of four starts including a victory in the Princess Margaret Stakes at Ascot Racecourse. At age three, she won England's Child Stakes at the Newmarket Racecourse and the Prix de l'Opéra at Longchamp Racecourse in Paris, France.

=== North America ===
Royal Heroine was sent to race on the West Coast of the United States where she was conditioned by trainer John Gosden. At age four, her career almost ended when she was the third horse in a three-horse accident during the running of the Santa Ana Handicap. Although two horses died and Royal Heroine's jockey Fernando Toro was hospitalized, she came out of the accident with only minor scratches. Recovered, she went on win four major races plus she won the Palomar Handicap but was disqualified to third.

==== 1984 Breeders' Cup ====
In winning the inaugural running of the Breeders' Cup Mile at Hollywood Park Racetrack, Royal Heroine defeated a field of nine male horses. Ridden by Fernando Toro, she set a track and North American record for a mile on turf.

== Honors ==
Her performances in 1984 earned her American Champion Female Turf Horse honors.

Hollywood Park Racetrack named a stakes race in Royal Heroine's honor which was changed in 2006 to the CashCall Mile Invitational Stakes and in 2009 reverted to honor Royal Heroine.

== Breeding record ==
Retired for breeding, Royal Heroine produced seven foals. Although bred to notable sires such as Sadler's Wells and American Triple Crown winner, Affirmed, none achieved success in racing. However, her daughter Castilian Queen (Diesis) did produce the French Grade 1 Prix de l'Abbaye winner Carmine Lake (Royal Academy).

According to the British Racing Post, Royal Heroine died at age twenty-two.
