= Winsili =

British Thoroughbred racehorse

- Sire: Dansili
- Grandsire: Danehill
- Dam: Winter Sunrise
- Damsire: Pivotal
- Sex: Mare
- Foaled: 1 February 2010
- Country: United Kingdom
- Colour: Bay
- Breeder: Juddmonte Farms
- Owner: Khalid Abdullah
- Trainer: John Gosden
- Record: 5:3-1-0
- Earnings: £149,859

Major wins
- Fillies' Trial Stakes (2013); Nassau Stakes (2013)

Winsili (foaled 1 February 2010) is a British Thoroughbred racehorse who won the 2013 running of the Group One Nassau Stakes.
