= Thady Gosden =

British horse trainer

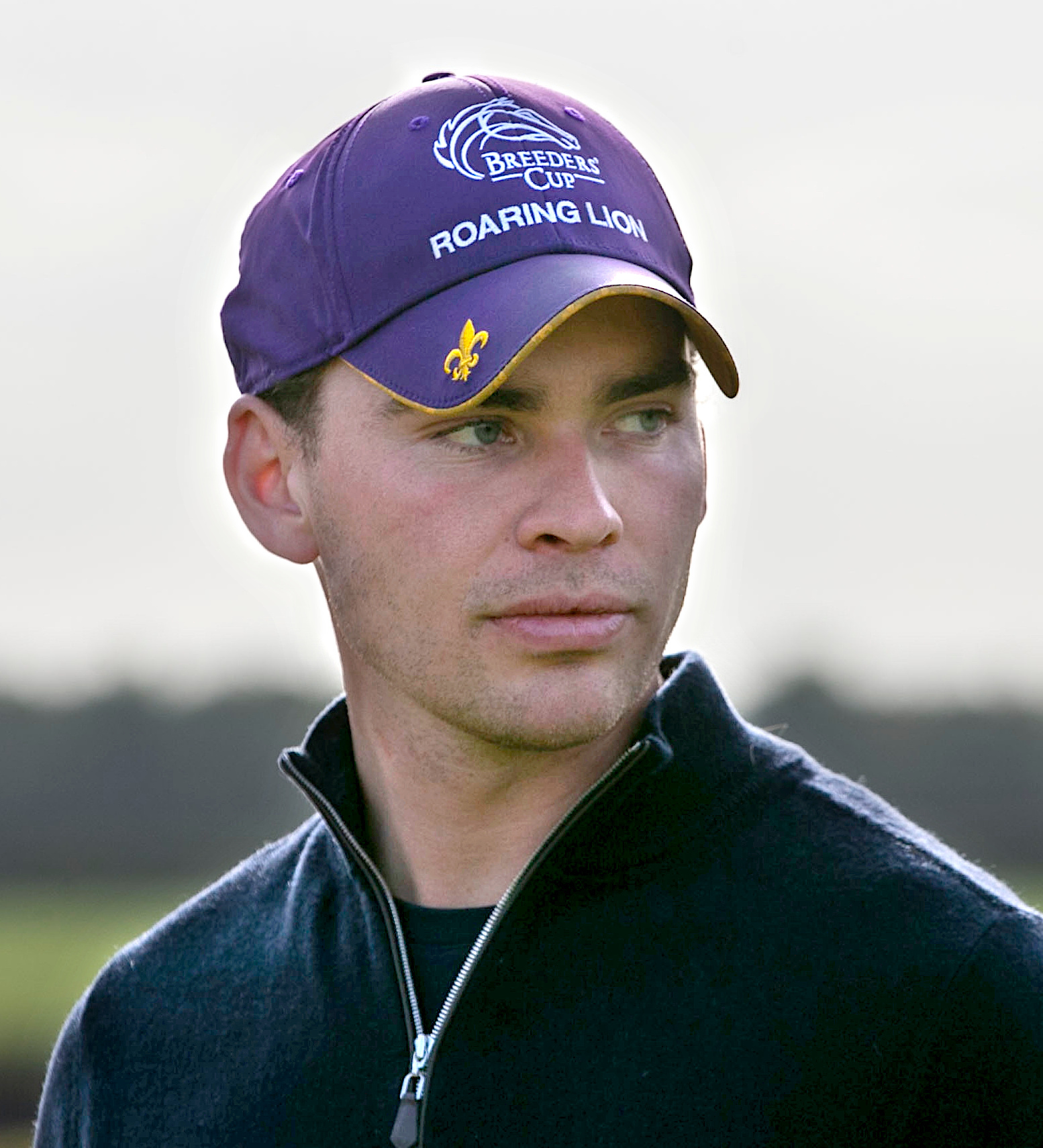
- Gosden in 2022
- Born: Thady Gosden; 18 April 1995 (age 31); Newmarket, Suffolk, England
- Education: University of Bristol
- Parents: John Gosden; Rachel Hood
- Horse racing career
- Occupation: Trainer
- Sport: Horse racing
- Career wins: Over 300 (ongoing)

Major racing wins
- British Classics: British Champions Fillies' and Mares' Stakes (2022), Coronation Stakes (2022), Fillies' Mile (2021), (2022); International Stakes (2021); International race wins: Prix de Diane (2022); Prix Jacques Le Marois (2021), (2022); Prix de Royallieu (2021); Dubai Sheema Classic (2021); Dubai Turf (2021), (2022); Saudi Cup (2021); Irish 2,000 Guineas (2025)

Racing awards
- British flat racing Champion Trainer (2023)

Significant horses
- Courage Mon Ami, Mostahdaf, Soul Sister, Emily Upjohn, Commissioning, Nashwa, Inspiral, Loving Dream, Palace Pier, Nazeef, Mishriff, Lord North

Thady Gosden (born April 1995) is a British racehorse trainer. He has trained over 300 winners worldwide, including winners of the Oaks, the British Champions Fillies' and Mares' Stakes, the Ascot Gold Cup, the Dubai Sheema Classic and the Prix Jacques Le Marois.

He trains at Clarehaven Stables in Newmarket, England.

== Early career ==
He was educated at Bristol University, where he studied History of Art, but said he always intended to become a trainer.

Gosden started training in 2021, holding the licence jointly with his father John Gosden.

In their first season together, the partnership won the Saudi Cup, the Dubai Turf and the Dubai Sheema Classic all within just over a month.

In their first full season, they recorded 133 winners from 651 runners at a strike rate of 20%, followed by 129 winners from 593 runners in 2022 at a 22% strike rate. Among the notable performers of this period was Inspiral, who won the Fillies' Mile as a two-year-old in 2021 before developing into one of the leading milers in Europe, and Nashwa, who won the Nassau Stakes at Goodwood in 2022.

The following year was very successful for Gosden. Classic success came via Soul Sister in the Oaks at Epsom, while Mostahdaf won the Juddmonte International at York. They became champion trainers in 2023. Inspiral capped the season by winning the Breeders' Cup Filly & Mare Turf at Santa Anita.

== Major wins ==
(United Kingdom) Great Britain

- Ascot Gold Cup - (2) - Courage Mon Ami (2023), Trawlerman (2025)
- British Champions Fillies' and Mares' Stakes – (1) – Emily Upjohn (2022)
- British Champions Long Distance Cup - (1) - Trawlerman (2025)
- Champion Stakes - (1) - Ombudsman (2026)
- Coronation Cup – Emily Upjohn (2023)
- Coronation Stakes – (1) – Inspiral (2022)
- Falmouth Stakes - (1) - Nashwa (2023)
- Fillies' Mile – (2) – Inspiral (2021), Commissioning (2022)
- International Stakes – (3) – Mishriff (2021), Mostahdaf (2023), Ombudsman (2025)
- Lockinge Stakes – (3) – Palace Pier (2021), Audience (2024), Lead Artist (2025)
- Nassau Stakes – (1) – Nashwa (2022)
- Oaks Stakes – (1) - Soul Sister (2023)
- Prince of Wales's Stakes - (3) - Mostahdaf (2023), Ombudsman (2025, 2026)
- Queen Anne Stakes - (1) – Palace Pier (2021)
- St James's Palace Stakes - (1) - Field Of Gold (2025)
- Sun Chariot Stakes - (1) - Inspiral (2023)

(Republic of Ireland) Ireland

- Irish 2,000 Guineas – (1) – Field Of Gold (2025)

France

- Prix de Diane – (1) – Nashwa (2022)
- Prix de Royallieu – (1) – Loving Dream (2021)
- Prix Jacques Le Marois – (3) – Palace Pier (2021), Inspiral (2022, 2023)
- Prix de l'Opéra - (1) - Friendly Soul (2024)

Saudi Arabia

- Saudi Cup – (1) – Mishriff (2021)

(United Arab Emirates) UAE

- Dubai Sheema Classic – (1) – Mishriff (2021)
- Dubai Turf - (3) - Lord North (2022, 2023), Ombudsman (2026)

United States

- Breeders' Cup Filly & Mare Turf - (1) - Inspiral (2023)
