= Zenda (horse) =

British Thoroughbred racehorse

- Sire: Zamindar
- Grandsire: Gone West
- Dam: Hope
- Damsire: Dancing Brave
- Sex: Mare
- Foaled: 18 February 1999
- Died: 17 May 2019
- Country: Great Britain
- Colour: Bay
- Breeder: Juddmonte Farms
- Owner: Khalid Abdullah
- Trainer: John Gosden
- Record: 8: 2-3-1
- Earnings: £253,739

Major wins
- Poule d'Essai des Pouliches (2002)

Zenda (1999–2019) was a thoroughbred racehorse. She won the Poule d'Essai des Pouliches at Longchamp Racecourse in France in 2002. She was the dam of Kingman and a half-sister to the leading sprinter and stallion Oasis Dream, and is closely related to Beat Hollow and the Irish Oaks winner Wemyss Bight. She was euthanized due to laminitis on 17 May 2019 at the age of 20.
