= Emily Upjohn =

British Thoroughbred racehorse

- Sire: Sea The Stars
- Grandsire: Cape Cross
- Dam: Hidden Brief
- Damsire: Barathea
- Sex: Filly
- Foaled: 8 March 2019
- Country: United Kingdom
- Colour: Bay
- Breeder: Lordship Stud & Sunderland Holding
- Owner: Lloyd Webber, Tactful Finance, Stuart Roden
- Trainer: John & Thady Gosden
- Record: 7: 5-1-0
- Earnings: £1,238,963

Major wins
- Musidora Stakes (2022); British Champions Fillies & Mares Stakes (2022); Coronation Cup (2023); Timeform rating: 132
- Last updated on 2 November 2024

Emily Upjohn (foaled 8 March 2019) is a British Thoroughbred racehorse. After winning her only race as a two-year-old she emerged as a top-class performer in the following season, winning the Musidora Stakes and running well in the Epsom Oaks. She then won the Group One British Champions Fillies and Mares Stakes. On her first run as a four-year-old she won the Coronation Cup.

In December 2023, Timeform awarded Emily Upjohn the highest rating for a three-year-old+ female, beating an international field.

In November 2024, Emily Upjohn retired to stud as a broodmare. She is now in foal to Flightline on her way to her new permanent home at Northern Farm in Japan.

== Background ==
Emily Upjohn is a bay filly with no white markings bred in England by the Newmarket-based Lordship Stud & Sunderland Holding. In October 2020 the yearling was put up for auction at Tattersalls and was bought for 60,000 guineas by Blandford Bloodstock. She entered the ownership of Tactful Finance (Jonathan Shack) and Stuart Roden and was sent into training with John & Thady Gosden at Newmarket. The filly was named after the character played by Margaret Dumont in the 1937 Marx Brothers film A Day At The Races.

She was from the eighth crop of foals sired by Sea the Stars who won the 2000 Guineas, Epsom Derby and Prix de l'Arc de Triomphe in 2009. His other major winners have included Baaeed, Harzand, Taghrooda, Stradivarius, Sea of Class and Sea The Moon. Emily Upjohn's dam Hidden Brief showed modest racing ability, winning one minor race from fifteen starts and being placed at Listed level, She was a full-sister to the dam of Harzand and a granddaughter of Hazy Idea, the dam of Hittite Glory, making her a close relative of Never Bend and Hethersett.

== Racing career ==
=== 2021: two-year-old season ===
Emily Upjohn began her racing career in a novice race over nine and a half furlongs on the synthetic Tapeta track at Wolverhampton Racecourse on 23 November when she was ridden by Robert Havlin and started at odds of 12/1 against eleven opponents. She started slowly but made steady progress in the last quarter mile, took the lead in the final strides and won by a neck from Secret Image.

=== 2022: three-year-old season ===
In 2022 Emily Upjohn was ridden in all of her races by Frankie Dettori. On her seasonal debut she started 5/4 favourite for a novice race over ten furlongs on good ground at Sandown Park on 22 April. She tracked the front-running Follow That Star before taking the lead two furlongs out and drew away to win by nine and a half lengths in "impressive" style. For her next start the filly was stepped up to Group 3 level for the Musidora Stakes (a trial race for the Epsom Oaks) over ten and a half furlongs at York Racecourse on 11 May. Starting the 4/7 favourite against four opponents she raced just behind the leaders before going to the front entering the last quarter mile and steadily increased her advantage to win "readily" by five and a half lengths from Life of Dreams. Dettori commented "She passed a good test... She's exuberant, but also in control, which is a good combination to have. She's a big unit, she's lovely. She's got speed, she stays... for a girl that's only run three times, she hasn't stopped surprising me."

On 3 June Emily Upjohn started the 6/4 favourite for 244th running of the Oaks Stakes over one and a half miles at Epsom Racecourse. She lost many lengths at the start when she stumbled exiting the stalls but recovered and appeared to be going well as she moved into contention approaching the last quarter mile. She made a sustained challenge to the leader Tuesday in the closing stages but narrowly failed to overhaul her Irish-trained rival and was beaten a short head into second place. After the race Dettori said "The race was gone [at the start], I was way too far back. Bless her, she took me there in great style but the damage was done. She was a very unlucky loser." The filly was then matched against male opposition and older horses in the King George VI and Queen Elizabeth Stakes over the same distance at Ascot Racecourse in July. She went off the 3/1 third choice in the betting but never looked likely to win and faded badly in the closing stages to come home last of the six runners behind Pyledriver, beaten more than twenty lengths by the winner.

After a break of more than two and a half months Emily Upjohn returned to Ascot's mile and a half course for the Group 1 British Champions Fillies & Mares Stakes on good to soft ground in October. She was made the 3/1 favourite ahead of Sea La Rosa (winner of the Prix de Royallieu) and Eternal Pearl (Prix Minerve) in a fourteen-runner field which also included Verry Elleegant, Eshaada and Sweet Lady (Prix Vermeille). Emily Upjohn settled in mid-division as Rosscarberry set the pace before making progress on the outside entering the straight. She took the lead approaching the final furlong and went clear of her rivals to win by three lengths from the 50/1 outsider Thunder Kiss. After the race John Gosden said "I have owners who’ve let me be patient, they’ve let me give her all the time she needed [after the King George]... I had everything right in her work and Frankie wanted to ride her, but I didn’t know about the ground. She’s a big girl but she hasn’t strengthened into her frame, she’s still quite light, so it was if she handled it. Mind you, she was so wide she was probably on fresh ground. She stays in training."

=== 2023: four-year-old season ===
In the early part of 2023 Emily Upjohn was aimed at the Dubai Sheema Classic at Meydan Racecourse in March but missed the race after failing to impress her trainer in exercise gallops. Gosden commented "She has yet to come to her peak condition and we'll wait for early summer targets here. She simply needs more time in the spring to come to herself." The filly eventually began her second campaign in the Coronation Cup over one and a half miles on good to firm ground at Epsom on 2 June, With Dettori in the saddle she went off the 11/4 second favourite behind Westover in a five-runner field which also included Hurricane Lane, Point Lonsdale (Huxley Stakes) and Tunnes (Grosser Preis von Bayern). She settled at the rear of the field as Point Lonsdale set a steady pace, then moved up to take the lead in the straight. She opened up a clear advantage over her male opponents and stayed on well to win by one and three quarter lengths from Westover, with a gap of seven and a half lengths back to the others. John Gosden said "She did it beautifully... She probably hit the front too soon and she’s having a really good blow so she should come on for that. She ended up in front because of the way she quickened, she’s a hugely talented filly."

== Pedigree ==
Pedigree of Emily Upjohn (GB), bay filly, 2019
| Sire Sea the Stars (IRE) 2006 | Cape Cross (IRE); 1994 | Green Desert (USA) | Danzig |
| Sire Sea the Stars (IRE) 2006 | Cape Cross (IRE); 1994 | Green Desert (USA) | Foreign Courier |
| Sire Sea the Stars (IRE) 2006 | Cape Cross (IRE); 1994 | Park Appeal | Ahonoora (GB) |
| Sire Sea the Stars (IRE) 2006 | Cape Cross (IRE); 1994 | Park Appeal | Balidaress |
| Sire Sea the Stars (IRE) 2006 | Urban Sea (USA); 1989 | Miswaki | Mr Prospector |
| Sire Sea the Stars (IRE) 2006 | Urban Sea (USA); 1989 | Miswaki | Hopespringseternal |
| Sire Sea the Stars (IRE) 2006 | Urban Sea (USA); 1989 | Allegretta (GB) | Lombard (GER) |
| Sire Sea the Stars (IRE) 2006 | Urban Sea (USA); 1989 | Allegretta (GB) | Anatevka (GER) |
| Dam Hidden Brief (GB) 2006 | Barathea (IRE); 1990 | Sadlers Wells (USA) | Northern Dancer (CAN) |
| Dam Hidden Brief (GB) 2006 | Barathea (IRE); 1990 | Sadlers Wells (USA) | Fairy Bridge |
| Dam Hidden Brief (GB) 2006 | Barathea (IRE); 1990 | Brocade (GB) | Habitat (USA) |
| Dam Hidden Brief (GB) 2006 | Barathea (IRE); 1990 | Brocade (GB) | Canton Silk |
| Dam Hidden Brief (GB) 2006 | Hazaradjat (IRE); 1989 | Darshaan (GB) | Shirley Heights |
| Dam Hidden Brief (GB) 2006 | Hazaradjat (IRE); 1989 | Darshaan (GB) | Delsy (FR) |
| Dam Hidden Brief (GB) 2006 | Hazaradjat (IRE); 1989 | Hazy Idea (GB) | Hethersett |
| Dam Hidden Brief (GB) 2006 | Hazaradjat (IRE); 1989 | Hazy Idea (GB) | Won't Linger (Family: 21-a) |
