= Crystal Music =

American-bred Thoroughbred racehorse

- Racing silks of Lord Lloyd-Webber
- Sire: Nureyev
- Grandsire: Northern Dancer
- Dam: Crystal Spray
- Damsire: Beldale Flutter
- Sex: Mare
- Foaled: 11 February 1998
- Country: US
- Colour: Bay
- Breeder: Watership Down Stud
- Owner: Lord Lloyd Webber
- Trainer: John Gosden
- Record: 9 starts; 3 wins, 2 seconds
- Earnings: $367,336

Major wins
- Fillies' Mile
- Last updated on 30 May 2011

Crystal Music is an American-born thoroughbred racehorse and winner of the Fillies' Mile at Ascot. She was one of the last offspring of the leading sire Nureyev, who died in 2001.
