= Star of Seville =

British-bred Thoroughbred racehorse

- Racing silks of Lady Bamford
- Sire: Duke of Marmalade
- Grandsire: Danehill
- Dam: Stage Presence
- Damsire: War Chant
- Sex: Mare
- Foaled: 2012
- Colour: Bay
- Breeder: Lady Bamford
- Owner: Lady Bamford
- Trainer: John Gosden
- Record: 6: 4-0-1
- Earnings: £514,267

Major wins
- Musidora Stakes (2015); Prix de Diane (2015)

Star of Seville is a British-trained Thoroughbred racehorse. She won the French Oaks, the Prix de Diane, in 2015.
