= Virtual (horse) =

British-bred Thoroughbred racehorse

Virtual (foaled 10 May 2005) is a thoroughbred racehorse who won the Lockinge Stakes at Newbury in 2009.

Virtual is a bay horse who was sired by Pivotal out of Virtuous. He was bred and owned by Cheveley Park Stud and trained by John Gosden at Newmarket, Suffolk. He ran fourteen times in a career that lasted from September 2007 to October 2009 and won five times. He gained his most important win in the 2009 Lockinge Stakes when he beat Alexandros by a nose, ridden by Jimmy Fortune.
