= May Ball (horse) =

British racehorse

- Breed: Thoroughbred
- Sire: Cadeaux Genereux
- Grandsire: Young Generation
- Dam: Minute Waltz
- Damsire: Sadler's Wells
- Sex: Mare
- Foaled: 14 February 1997
- Country: United Kingdom
- Colour: Bay
- Trainer: John Gosden
- Record: 5 wins
- Earnings: £109,871

Major wins
- Prix Maurice de Gheest (2002)

May Ball (foaled 14 February 1997) was a British Thoroughbred racehorse trained by John Gosden. A bay mare by Cadeaux Genereux out of the Sadler's Wells mare Minute Waltz, she won five races in Britain and France, most notably the Prix Maurice de Gheest at Deauville, a Group 1 race, in 2002. She was kept in training as a five-year-old, and Gosden later described her Prix Maurice de Gheest victory as "a wonderful advertisement for keeping a five-year-old in training."

== Background ==
May Ball was a bay mare bred in the United Kingdom, by Cadeaux Genereux out of the mare Minute Waltz, herself by Sadler's Wells. Cadeaux Genereux, a son of Young Generation, was a top-class sprinter trained by Alex Scott who won the Haydock Sprint Cup in 1988 before becoming an influential stallion, particularly noted for producing high-class sprinters and milers. Minute Waltz was unraced and is an own sister to Marcham; she produced six winners from seven runners including May Ball.

== Racing career ==
May Ball was trained throughout her career by John Gosden, initially at Stanley House Stables in Newmarket and subsequently at Manton. Her career record included five wins and prize money of £109,871.

Among her placed efforts, she finished second in the Prix de Ris-Orangis at Deauville, a Group 3 race, and third in both the Sun Chariot Stakes at Newmarket, a Group 2 race, and the Prix Perth at Saint-Cloud, another Group 3. She also won the Prix de Lieurey at Deauville, a Listed race.

=== 2002: Prix Maurice de Gheest ===
May Ball's most significant victory came in the Prix Maurice de Gheest at Deauville in August 2002, a Group 1 race run over 1,300 metres (approximately 6½ furlongs). The race has been open to three-year-olds and older horses since 1995 when it was elevated to Group 1 status. May Ball, as a five-year-old, won the race to provide Gosden with a notable Group 1 success during his tenure at Manton. Gosden afterwards said of her: "She has been going well at home and we were expecting a big run. It's a wonderful advertisement for keeping a five-year-old in training."

== Stud career ==
May Ball was retired to stud following her racing career. She was subsequently sold to Japan where she was a broodmare until 2014.

== Pedigree ==
Pedigree of May Ball (GB)
Sire Cadeaux Genereux (GB) ch. 1985	Young Generation (IRE) b. 1976	Balidar (GB)	Will Somers (GB)
Sire Cadeaux Genereux (GB) ch. 1985	Young Generation (IRE) b. 1976	Balidar (GB)	Violet Bank (GB)
Sire Cadeaux Genereux (GB) ch. 1985	Young Generation (IRE) b. 1976	Brig O'Doon (GB)	Shantung (FR)
Sire Cadeaux Genereux (GB) ch. 1985	Young Generation (IRE) b. 1976	Brig O'Doon (GB)	Tam o'Shanter (GB)
Sire Cadeaux Genereux (GB) ch. 1985	Smarten Up (GB) ch. 1975	Sharpen Up (GB)	Atan (USA)
Sire Cadeaux Genereux (GB) ch. 1985	Smarten Up (GB) ch. 1975	Sharpen Up (GB)	Rocchetta (GB)
Sire Cadeaux Genereux (GB) ch. 1985	Smarten Up (GB) ch. 1975	L'Anguissola (GB)	Soderini (GB)
Sire Cadeaux Genereux (GB) ch. 1985	Smarten Up (GB) ch. 1975	L'Anguissola (GB)	Posh (GB)
Dam Minute Waltz (IRE) b. 1987	Sadler's Wells b. 1981	Northern Dancer (CAN)	Nearctic (CAN)
Dam Minute Waltz (IRE) b. 1987	Sadler's Wells b. 1981	Northern Dancer (CAN)	Natalma (USA)
Dam Minute Waltz (IRE) b. 1987	Sadler's Wells b. 1981	Fairy Bridge (USA)	Bold Reason (USA)
Dam Minute Waltz (IRE) b. 1987	Sadler's Wells b. 1981	Fairy Bridge (USA)	Special (USA)
Dam Minute Waltz (IRE) b. 1987	Dazzling Light (GB) b. 1972	Silly Season (USA)	Tom Fool (USA)
Dam Minute Waltz (IRE) b. 1987	Dazzling Light (GB) b. 1972	Silly Season (USA)	Double Deal (GB)
Dam Minute Waltz (IRE) b. 1987	Dazzling Light (GB) b. 1972	Picture Light (FR)	Court Martial (GB)
Dam Minute Waltz (IRE) b. 1987	Dazzling Light (GB) b. 1972	Picture Light (FR)	Queen of Light (GB)
