= Royal Oath =

American-bred Thoroughbred racehorse

- Sire: Kingmambo
- Grandsire: Mr. Prospector
- Dam: Sherkiya
- Damsire: Goldneyev
- Sex: Stallion
- Foaled: 27 April 2003
- Country: United States
- Colour: Bay
- Breeder: Farish & Farish LLC
- Owner: William S. Farish III; William S. Farish IV
- Trainer: John Gosden; Mark E. Casse
- Record: 16: 4–3–1

Major wins
- Royal Hunt Cup (2007); King Edward Stakes (2008)

Royal Oath (foaled 27 April 2003) is an American-bred Thoroughbred racehorse. He won the Royal Hunt Cup at Royal Ascot in 2007.
