= Zoffany (American horse) =

American-bred Thoroughbred racehorse

- Sire: Our Native
- Grandsire: Exclusive Native
- Dam: Grey Dawn Girl
- Damsire: Grey Dawn
- Sex: Stallion
- Foaled: May 14, 1980
- Country: United States
- Colour: Bay
- Breeder: Carpinelli & Henwood Brothers
- Owner: A. & J. Bodie/A. Speelman
- Trainer: Guy Harwood; John Gosden
- Record: 36: 15-10-2
- Earnings: $1,225,569

Major wins
- Feilden Stakes (1983); Citation Handicap (1985); Hollywood Turf Cup (1985); Inglewood Handicap (1986); Sunset Handicap (1986); San Marcos Handicap (1987); San Luis Rey Handicap (1987)

Awards
- Timeform rating 119 in 1983

Zoffany (1980–1998) was an American-bred Thoroughbred racehorse. Bred in New Jersey, he was large bay horse with a narrow white blaze. Zoffany was first sent to be trained in Britain by Guy Harwood where he won three times from nine starts in 1982 and 1983. He ran in the 1983 Epsom Derby finishing twentieth of the twenty-one runners behind Teenoso. At the end of his three-year-old season he has exported to the United States and was trained in California by John Gosden. He won the Hollywood Turf Cup in 1985 and the San Luis Rey Handicap in 1987. After his retirement from racing he was exported to stand as a stallion in Australia, where he died in 1998.

The name Zoffany was later used for an Irish racehorse best known for finishing second to Frankel in the 2011 St. James's Palace Stakes.
