= Loving Dream =

British racehorse

- Sire: Gleneagles
- Grandsire: Galileo
- Dam: Kissable
- Damsire: Danehill Dancer
- Sex: Filly
- Foaled: 29 March 2018
- Country: Ireland
- Color: Bay
- Breeder: Lordship Stud
- Owner: Lordship Stud
- Trainer: John Gosden & Thady Gosden
- Record: 7: 3-1-0
- Earnings: £268,656

Major wins
- Ribblesdale Stakes (2021); Prix de Royallieu (2021)

Loving Dream (foaled 29 March 2018) is a British Thoroughbred racehorse. After winning the second of her two starts as a two-year-old in 2020 she excelled over long and extended distances in the following year, winning the Ribblesdale Stakes in England and the Prix de Royallieu in France.

== Background ==
Loving Dream is a bay filly with a white blaze bred and owned by the Newmarket-based Lordship Stud. She was sent into training with John Gosden at the Clarehaven Stable in Newmarket. Gosden entered a training partnership with his son Thady for the 2021 season.

She was from the second crop of foals sired by Gleneagles who won the 2000 Guineas, Irish 2000 Guineas and St James's Palace Stakes in 2015. Loving Dream's dam Kissable showed good racing ability, finishing third in the Moyglare Stud Stakes in Ireland as a juvenile and later winning the Waya Stakes in the United States as a four-year-old. Her dam Kitty O'Shea was a daughter of the Park Hill Stakes winner Eva Luna, whose other foals included Brian Boru, Sea Moon and the dam of Workforce.

== Racing career ==
=== 2020: two-year-old season ===
Loving Dream began her racing career in novice race (for horses with no more than two previous wins) over one mile on the synthetic Polytrack surface at Kempton Park Racecourse on 11 November when she started at odds of 10/1 and came home seventh of the eleven runners after failing to recover from a slow start. On 8 December Loving Dream, ridden by Robert Havlin, recorded her first victory in a maiden race over 8 1/2 furlongs on the synthetic Tapeta track at Wolverhampton Racecourse, taking the lead in the closing stages and winning by a length from Sea La Rosa at odds of 11/2.

=== 2021: three-year-old season ===
On her first run as a three-year-old Loving Dream made her debut on turf and finished second to the Michael Stoute-trained Noon Star in a novice race over ten furlongs at Wetherby Racecourse on 25 April, beaten 2 1/2 lengths by the winner. She was then stepped up in class to contest the Listed Oaks Trial Fillies' Stakes over 11 1/2 furlongs at Lingfield Park on 8 May. She started favourite but after leading until the last quarter mile she was outpaced in the closing stages and came home fifth behind Sherbet Lemon. Despite being beaten in her first two starts the filly was promoted to Group 2 class for the Ribblesdale Stakes over 1 1/2 miles at Royal Ascot on 17 June when she was ridden by Havlin and started an 18/1 outsider in a thirteen-runner field. Noon Star started favourite while the other contenders included Dubai Fountain (Cheshire Oaks), Eshaada and Divinely (Flame of Tara Stakes). Loving Dream raced in second place behind Dubai Fountain, took the lead two furlongs from the finish and stayed on well to win by three quarters of a length from Eshaada. After the race John Gosden said "Robert committed early and made best use of her stamina... she’s very game and very honest and it was a wonderful positive ride by Robert".

Loving Dream was moved up to Group 1 class for her next start when she contested the Yorkshire Oaks over 1 1/2 miles at York Racecourse on 19 August. Ridden by Frankie Dettori she started an 18/1 outsider and was never in serious contention as she came home fifth of the seven runners behind Snowfall, beaten more than ten lengths by the winner. The filly then stepped up in distance for the Group 1 Prix de Royallieu over 2800 metres on very soft ground at Longchamp Racecourse on 2 October. With Dettori again in the saddle she started the 7.8/1 fourth choice in the betting behind Valia (Prix Maurice de Nieuil), Joie de Soir (Grand Prix de Clairefontaine) and Yesyes (Chester Stakes) in a ten-runner field which also included Believe In Love (2021 Stanerra Stakes) and Passion (2020 Stanerra Stakes). In a change of tactics Dettori sent his mount into the lead from the start and she maintained her advantage until the last 400 metres when she was overtaken by Believe In Love. Loving Dream however "rallied under pressure" in the closing stages, regained the lead near the finish and won by a short neck. After the race Thady Gosden said "She may not have been 100% at York and she never got into that rhythm she usually does in her races and wasn't able to put her best foot forward then. She's enjoyed getting her toe in a bit more here. Frankie is a genius from the front, as he always tells us, and luckily today he was able to show us."

On 28 November it was announced that Loving Dream had been retired from racing to become a broodmare for Lordship Stud. John Gosden said "Loving Dream was a very consistent filly who could handle any ground. She was a very talented performer as she showed when winning at Royal Ascot and then at Longchamp. She was very genuine and was a great credit to the Lordship Stud".

== Pedigree ==
Pedigree of Loving Dream (GB), bay filly, 2018
| Sire Gleneagles (IRE) 2012 | Galileo (IRE); 1998 | Sadler's Wells (USA) | Northern Dancer (CAN) |
| Sire Gleneagles (IRE) 2012 | Galileo (IRE); 1998 | Sadler's Wells (USA) | Fairy Bridge |
| Sire Gleneagles (IRE) 2012 | Galileo (IRE); 1998 | Urban Sea (USA) | Miswaki |
| Sire Gleneagles (IRE) 2012 | Galileo (IRE); 1998 | Urban Sea (USA) | Allegretta (GB) |
| Sire Gleneagles (IRE) 2012 | You'resothrilling (USA); 2005 | Storm Cat | Storm Bird (CAN) |
| Sire Gleneagles (IRE) 2012 | You'resothrilling (USA); 2005 | Storm Cat | Terlingua |
| Sire Gleneagles (IRE) 2012 | You'resothrilling (USA); 2005 | Mariah's Storm | Rahy |
| Sire Gleneagles (IRE) 2012 | You'resothrilling (USA); 2005 | Mariah's Storm | Immense |
| Dam Kissable (IRE) 2008 | Danehill Dancer (IRE); 1993 | Danehill (USA) | Danzig |
| Dam Kissable (IRE) 2008 | Danehill Dancer (IRE); 1993 | Danehill (USA) | Razyana |
| Dam Kissable (IRE) 2008 | Danehill Dancer (IRE); 1993 | Mira Adonde (USA) | Sharpen Up (GB) |
| Dam Kissable (IRE) 2008 | Danehill Dancer (IRE); 1993 | Mira Adonde (USA) | Lettre d'Amour |
| Dam Kissable (IRE) 2008 | Kitty O'Shea (GB); 2002 | Sadler's Wells (USA) | Northern Dancer (CAN) |
| Dam Kissable (IRE) 2008 | Kitty O'Shea (GB); 2002 | Sadler's Wells (USA) | Fairy Bridge |
| Dam Kissable (IRE) 2008 | Kitty O'Shea (GB); 2002 | Eva Luna (USA) | Alleged |
| Dam Kissable (IRE) 2008 | Kitty O'Shea (GB); 2002 | Eva Luna (USA) | Media Luna (GB) (Family: 14-c) |

- Loving Dream was inbred 3 × 3 to Sadler's Wells, meaning that this stallion appears twice in the third generation of her pedigree.
