= Thoroughbred Daily News =

American Thoroughbred racing publication

- Format: Website and digital newsletter
- Owner: MediaVista Inc.
- Publisher: Sue Finley
- Language: English
- Headquarters: Red Bank, New Jersey, United States
- Website: thoroughbreddailynews.com

Thoroughbred Daily News (TDN) is an American online publication and digital newsletter covering Thoroughbred horse racing and the international bloodstock industry. It is based in Red Bank, New Jersey, and publishes news, race reports, sales coverage, features, video content and podcasts.

== History ==
The publication originated as a daily fax newsletter for the Thoroughbred industry. In 1993, Sue Finley and Barry Weisbord formed MediaVista Inc., which became the parent company of the publication and took over its daily production.

TDN later expanded from fax distribution to an emailed PDF edition and then to a website. Its coverage developed to include photographs, race replays, previews, feature articles, videos and podcasts. In 2007, TDN changed its business model to a free to access advertising supported website. The publication continued to offer a fax edition until 2019.

In 2018, Weisbord retired as president and co-publisher. Finley became sole publisher and president, with Gary King involved in the company's editorial, commercial and international operations.

== Coverage ==
Thoroughbred Daily News covers racing, breeding, bloodstock sales and industry news in several regions, including North America, Europe and Australia. Its website includes daily editions, news alerts, race replays, entries and archive material. Finley has described TDN as the Wall Street Journal of the thoroughbred world.
