= Nashwa (horse) =

British Thoroughbred racehorse

- Sire: Frankel
- Grandsire: Galileo
- Dam: Princess Loulou
- Damsire: Pivotal
- Sex: Filly
- Foaled: 9 May 2019
- Country: United Kingdom
- Colour: Bay
- Breeder: Blue Diamond Stud Farm
- Owner: Imad Alsagar
- Trainer: John and Thady Gosden
- Record: 11: 5-2-2
- Earnings: £1,281,965

Major wins
- Fillies' Trial Stakes (2022); Prix de Diane (2022); Nassau Stakes (2022); Falmouth Stakes (2023)
- Last updated on 14 July 2023

Nashwa (foaled 9 May 2019) is a British Thoroughbred racehorse. After finishing third in her only start as a two-year-old in 2021 she emerged as a top-class middle distance filly in the following year, winning the Fillies' Trial Stakes and running third in the Epsom Oaks before taking the Prix de Diane and Nassau Stakes.

== Background ==
Nashwa is a bay filly with a white star and two white socks bred by her owner, Imad Al Sagar's Blue Diamond Stud Farm. She was sent into training with John and Thady Gosden at Clarehaven Stables in Newmarket, Suffolk. She was ridden in all of her early races by Hollie Doyle.

She was from the sixth crop of foals sired by Frankel, an undefeated racehorse whose other progeny have included Cracksman, Adayar, Soul Stirring and Hurricane Lane. Nashwa's dam Princess Loulou showed good racing ability, winning three of her fourteen races including the Listed Gillies Fillies' Stakes. She was descended from the British broodmare Pelting (foaled 1958) who was the female-line ancestor of several other major winners including Awzaan, Moon Ballad, Bassenthwaite, Telescope, Braashee (Prix Royal-Oak) and Central Park (Derby Italiano, runner-up in the Melbourne Cup).

== Racing career ==
=== 2021: two-year-old season ===
Nashwa began her racing career on 30 October in a novice race (for horses with no more than two previous wins) over seven furlongs on good ground at Newmarket Racecourse. Starting the 85/40 favourite she made steady progress from the rear of the field without ever looking likely to win and came home third behind Golden Lyra and Centrallia, beaten five and a half lengths by the winner.

=== 2022: three-year-old season ===
On her first appearance as a three-year-old Nashwa started 13/8 favourite in a nine-runner novice race over one mile at Haydock Park on 23 April. After tracking the leaders in the early stages she went to the front approaching the final furlong and accelerated away from her opponents to win "easily" by six and a half lengths from her stablemate Wonderful Times. She was then stepped up in class and distance on 14 May for the Listed Fillies' Trial Stakes over ten furlongs at Newbury Racecourse. Starting the 5/6 favourite she was restrained by Doyle at the back of the seven-runner field before making "smooth progress" on the outside and after gaining the advantage two furlongs out she won by one and three quarter lengths from Stay Alert. Imad Al Sagar's racing manager Teddy Grimthorpe commented: "She did everything we hoped she would. She settled well, quickened well and galloped to the line. She has taken it in her stride in every way... It is only her third race and she is learning all the time. I think the great thing is the way she took herself into the race and settled when she asked her and she lengthened. She is a lovely-striding filly from that point of view, she looks smart. Hollie gets on with her well."

On 3 June Nashwa was one of eleven fillies to contest the 244th running of the Oaks Stakes over one and a half miles at Epsom Racecourse and started the 4/1 second choice in the betting behind her stablemate Emily Upjohn (winner of the Musidora Stakes). She raced in mid-division and after briefly looking unlikely to obtain a clear run in the straight she kept on well in the final furlong to finish third behind Tuesday and Emily Upjohn.

Sixteen days after her defeat at Epsom Nashwa was sent to France to contest the Prix de Diane over 2100 metres on good to soft ground at Chantilly Racecourse and started the 3/1 favourite in a seventeen-runner field which also included Zellie, Agave (Prix Penelope), Place du Carrousel (Prix Cleopatre) and Rosacea (Prix de la Grotte). Nashwa disputed the early lead before settling behind the outsider Tariyana and then regained the advantage 700 metres from the finish. She kept on "gamely" under pressure and held off a sustained challenge from La Parisenne to win by a short neck, with a gap of almost five lengths back to Rosacea in third. Hollie Doyle commented "I felt very vulnerable at the two-pole, I'm not going to lie. It was a muddling race and I expected some of the others to be a bit more excited pace-wise than they were. I didn’t want to be where I was but she was very relaxed and happy to be one off the rail with a bit of company beside. When the second horse came to my girth she really dug deep". John Gosden said "Nashwa is a very classy filly... We've run her in two Oaks, and it was tough on her. But she seemed remarkably calm after the race, she had what I call a very natural, normal blow... I think she definitely deserves a freshen-up and a summer holiday".

== Pedigree ==
Pedigree of Nashwa (GB), bay filly, 2019
Sire Frankel (GB) 2008	Galileo (IRE); 1998	Sadler's Wells (USA)	Northern Dancer (CAN)
Sire Frankel (GB) 2008	Galileo (IRE); 1998	Sadler's Wells (USA)	Fairy Bridge
Sire Frankel (GB) 2008	Galileo (IRE); 1998	Urban Sea (USA)	Miswaki
Sire Frankel (GB) 2008	Galileo (IRE); 1998	Urban Sea (USA)	Allegretta (GB)
Sire Frankel (GB) 2008	Kind (IRE); 2001	Danehill (USA)	Danzig
Sire Frankel (GB) 2008	Kind (IRE); 2001	Danehill (USA)	Razyana
Sire Frankel (GB) 2008	Kind (IRE); 2001	Rainbow Lake (GB)	Rainbow Quest (USA)
Sire Frankel (GB) 2008	Kind (IRE); 2001	Rainbow Lake (GB)	Rockfest (USA)
Dam Princess Loulou (IRE) 2010	Pivotal (GB); 1993	Polar Falcon (USA)	Nureyev
Dam Princess Loulou (IRE) 2010	Pivotal (GB); 1993	Polar Falcon (USA)	Marie d'Argonne (FR)
Dam Princess Loulou (IRE) 2010	Pivotal (GB); 1993	Fearless Revival	Cozzene (USA)
Dam Princess Loulou (IRE) 2010	Pivotal (GB); 1993	Fearless Revival	Stufida
Dam Princess Loulou (IRE) 2010	Aiming (GB); 2000	Highest Honor (FR)	Kenmare
Dam Princess Loulou (IRE) 2010	Aiming (GB); 2000	Highest Honor (FR)	High River
Dam Princess Loulou (IRE) 2010	Aiming (GB); 2000	Sweeping	Indian King (USA)
Dam Princess Loulou (IRE) 2010	Aiming (GB); 2000	Sweeping	Glancing (Family: 4-k)
