= Lord of Men =

British-bred Thoroughbred racehorse

Lord of Men (born 1993) is a thoroughbred racehorse. He won the Prix de la Salamandre in 1995.
