= Cartier Champion Three-year-old Filly =

Award in European horse racing

The Cartier Champion Three-year-old Filly is an award in European horse racing, founded in 1991, and sponsored by Cartier SA as part of the Cartier Racing Awards. The award winner is decided by points earned in group races plus the votes cast by British racing journalists and readers of the Racing Post and The Daily Telegraph newspapers.

== Records ==
Leading trainer (6 wins):

- John Gosden – Ryafan (1997), The Fugue (2012), Taghrooda (2014), Enable (2017), Star Catcher (2019), Inspiral (2022)

Leading owner (6 wins):

- Sue Magnier – Peeping Fawn (2007), Legatissimo (2015), Minding (2016), Love (2020), Snowfall (2021), Minnie Hauk (2025)
- Michael Tabor – Peeping Fawn (2007), Legatissimo (2015), Minding (2016), Love (2020), Snowfall (2021), Minnie Hauk (2025)

=== Winners ===
| Year | Horse | Bred | Trained | Trainer | Owner |
|---|---|---|---|---|---|
| 1991 | Kooyonga | IRE | IRE | Michael Kauntze | Mitsuo Haga |
| 1992 | User Friendly | GB | GB | Clive Brittain | Bill Gredley |
| 1993 | Intrepidity | GB | FR | André Fabre | Sheikh Mohammed |
| 1994 | Balanchine | USA | GB | Hilal Ibrahim | Godolphin |
| 1995 | Ridgewood Pearl | GB | IRE | John Oxx | Anne Coughlan |
| 1996 | Bosra Sham | USA | GB | Henry Cecil | Wafic Saïd |
| 1997 | Ryafan | USA | GB | John Gosden | Khalid Abdullah |
| 1998 | Cape Verdi | IRE | GB | Saeed bin Suroor | Godolphin |
| 1999 | Ramruma | USA | GB | Henry Cecil | Fahd Salman |
| 2000 | Petrushka | IRE | GB | Michael Stoute | Highclere Racing |
| 2001 | Banks Hill | GB | FR | André Fabre | Khalid Abdullah |
| 2002 | Kazzia | GER | GB | Saeed bin Suroor | Godolphin |
| 2003 | Russian Rhythm | USA | GB | Michael Stoute | Cheveley Park Stud |
| 2004 | Ouija Board | GB | GB | Ed Dunlop | Edward Stanley, 19th Earl of Derby |
| 2005 | Divine Proportions | USA | FR | Pascal Bary | Niarchos family |
| 2006 | Mandesha | FR | FR | Alain de Royer-Dupré | Zahra Aga Khan |
| 2007 | Peeping Fawn | USA | IRE | Aidan O'Brien | Sue Magnier and Michael Tabor |
| 2008 | Zarkava | IRE | FR | Alain de Royer-Dupré | Aga Khan IV |
| 2009 | Sariska | GB | GB | Michael Bell | Carole, Lady Bamford |
| 2010 | Snow Fairy | IRE | GB | Ed Dunlop | Anamoine Ltd |
| 2011 | Danedream | GER | GER | Peter Schiergen | Gestut Burg Eberstein & Teruya Yoshida |
| 2012 | The Fugue | GB | GB | John Gosden | Andrew Lloyd Webber |
| 2013 | Treve | FR | FR | Criquette Head-Maarek | Sheikh Joaan al Thani |
| 2014 | Taghrooda | GB | GB | John Gosden | Hamdan Al Maktoum |
| 2015 | Legatissimo | GB | IRE | David Wachman | Tabor, Smith and Magnier |
| 2016 | Minding | IRE | IRE | Aidan O'Brien | Tabor, Smith and Magnier |
| 2017 | Enable | GB | GB | John Gosden | Khalid Abdullah |
| 2018 | Alpha Centauri | IRE | IRE | Jessica Harrington | Niarchos family |
| 2019 | Star Catcher | GB | GB | John Gosden | Anthony Oppenheimer |
| 2020 | Love | IRE | IRE | Aidan O'Brien | Tabor, Smith and Magnier |
| 2021 | Snowfall | JPN | IRE | Aidan O'Brien | Tabor, Smith and Magnier |
| 2022 | Inspiral | GB | GB | John & Thady Gosden | Cheveley Park Stud |
| 2023 | Tahiyra | IRE | FR | Dermot Weld | Aga Khan IV |
| 2024 | Porta Fortuna | IRE | IRE | Donnacha O'Brien | Medallion, Weston, Fowler, Reeves |
| 2025 | Minnie Hauk | IRE | IRE | Aidan O'Brien | Tabor, Smith and Magnier |
| 2026 | Diamond Necklace | IRE | IRE | Aidan O'Brien | Westerberg, Tabor, Smith and Magnier |
