= Peeping Fawn =

American-bred Thoroughbred racehorse

- Sire: Danehill
- Grandsire: Danzig
- Dam: Maryinsky
- Damsire: Sadler's Wells
- Sex: Filly
- Foaled: 2004
- Country: United States
- Colour: Bay
- Breeder: Barnett Enterprises
- Owner: Michael Tabor & Sue Magnier
- Trainer: Aidan O'Brien
- Record: 10: 5-2-3
- Earnings: £581,871

Major wins
- Irish Pretty Polly Stakes (2007); Nassau Stakes (2007); Irish Oaks (2007); Yorkshire Oaks (2007)

Awards
- European Champion Three-Year-Old Filly (2007)

Peeping Fawn (foaled January 15, 2004 in Kentucky) is a Champion Irish-trained Thoroughbred racehorse. Unraced as a two-year-old, it took her four tries to break her maiden at age three. Her form then rapidly improved, reflected by a third-place finish in the Irish 1,000 Guineas and a second in The Oaks, followed by four consecutive Group One wins – the Pretty Polly, Irish Oaks, Nassau and Yorkshire Oaks. She was named the Cartier Champion Three-year-old Filly of 2007.

== Background ==
Peeping Fawn was bred by Barnett Enterprises, a breeding organisation associated with Coolmore Stud. She is by Danehill, a leading sire in Europe and Australia who sired over 300 stakes winners including Danehill Dancer, Dylan Thomas and Rock of Gibraltar. Her dam, Maryinsky by Sadler's Wells, was bred to Danehill in Ireland then sent to the United States where she foaled Peeping Fawn, who is thus considered an American-bred horse. Maryinsky was out of Kentucky Oaks winner Blush With Pride, who was also the dam of Better Than Honour, the dam of four stakes winners including back-to-back winners of the Belmont Stakes, Jazil and Rags to Riches. Blush With Pride's dam was Best In Show, the 1982 Kentucky Broodmare of the Year. Best In Show and her female descendants have produced numerous major winners around the world including Try My Best, El Gran Senor, Spinning World, Domedriver and Redoute's Choice.

Like many Coolmore horses, the official details of her ownership have changed from race to race: she has sometimes been listed as being the property of Michael Tabor, while on other occasions she was described as being owned by Tabor and Sue Magnier. She was trained by Aidan O'Brien.

== Racing career ==
Peeping Fawn did not race at the age of two. She made her three-year-old debut on 1 April 2007 at Navan, finishing a well-beaten third behind Ezima. She finished third in her next start on 15 April at the Curragh, then improved to second on 29 April at Gowran Park. She finally broke her maiden on 16 May at Naas, winning by 3 1/2 lengths from Katrisa.

O'Brien then stepped Peeping Fawn up in class, entering her in the Irish 1,000 Guineas on 27 May. Sent off at odds of 12/1, Peeping Fawn led during the early portion of the race and came under pressure with three furlongs remaining. She was headed in the final furlong by Finsceal Beo, but held on for third.

Just five days later, Peeping Fawn was entered in The Oaks where she was dismissed at odds of 20/1. She was restrained at the start of the race and stumbled around the two-furlong mark before settling near the back of the pack. She started a strong drive with over two furlongs remaining and moved into second place but could not get by Light Shift, who held on to win by half a length.

On 30 June, Peeping Fawn went off as the 7/4 favourite against older fillies and mares in the Pretty Polly Stakes at the Curragh. She was held up in mid-pack during the early running then quickened in the final furlong to win by two lengths over Speciosa. "She's a typical Danehill who thrives on her racing", said O'Brien, "and being out of a Sadler's Wells mare obviously helps her handle soft ground as well as she does."

Peeping Fawn followed up with a comfortable win in the Irish Oaks on 15 July, defeating Light Shift by 3 1/2 lengths. Johnny Murtagh, who took over as her jockey from an injured Kieren Fallon, held her near the back of the pack during the early portion of the race. "When she moved up on the last bend", he said, "I knew she was ready to go but I said steady girl, not yet! When I did ask her to quicken up and get on with the job, she did it very, very well."

Her next start was the Nassau Stakes on 4 August, where she again faced Light Shift plus top older horses Mandesha, Speciosa and Nannina. Speciosa set a brisk pace tracked by Peeping Fawn, who moved to the lead with three furlongs remaining. Mandesha made a late run to finish second but never threatened Peeping Fawn, who won by a length and a half under a hand ride.

On 22 August, she made what would prove her final start in the Yorkshire Oaks, winning by four lengths over Allegretto despite being eased near the finish. "She's a very, very good filly", said Murtagh. "She travelled very well and she's up there with the top fillies I've ever ridden."

Peeping Fawn was being considered for the Prix de l'Arc de Triomphe but O'Brien instead prioritized Dylan Thomas, who would go on to win the race. She was also considered for the Prix de l'Opéra but was instead given a rest in preparation for a four-year-old campaign. She was named the Cartier Champion Three-year-old Filly of 2007.

O'Brien originally planned to race Peeping Fawn in 2008 but she did not impress in training. After a June exercise gallop, she sustained a minor injury and was retired in August when she failed to respond to treatment.

== Broodmare career ==
Peeping Fawn was retired to broodmare duties in 2009. Her named foals include:

- Purely Priceless (2010 filly by Galileo) – placed twice in two starts
- Sir John Hawkins (2011 colt by Henrythenavigator, foaled in the USA) – won once and placed three times from 5 starts, including 3rd G2 Coventry Stakes; 3rd G2 July Stakes; 4th G3 Tyros Stakes
- Heaven's Glory (2013 colt by Tapit, foaled in Japan) – unraced
- Wisconsin (2014 colt by Deep Impact, foaled in Japan) – winner
- September (2015 filly by Deep Impact) – winner of first two starts including the Chesham Stakes at Royal Ascot

In 2016, she produced an as-yet unnamed colt by Australia. She was then bred to Gleneagles.

== Pedigree ==
Pedigree of Peeping Fawn, bay mare, January 15, 2004
Sire Danehill 1986	Danzig; 1977	Northern Dancer	Nearctic
Sire Danehill 1986	Danzig; 1977	Northern Dancer	Natalma
Sire Danehill 1986	Danzig; 1977	Pas de Nom	Admiral's Voyage
Sire Danehill 1986	Danzig; 1977	Pas de Nom	*Petitioner
Sire Danehill 1986	Razyana; 1981	His Majesty	*Ribot
Sire Danehill 1986	Razyana; 1981	His Majesty	Flower Bowl
Sire Danehill 1986	Razyana; 1981	Spring Adieu	Buckpasser
Sire Danehill 1986	Razyana; 1981	Spring Adieu	Natalma
Dam Maryinsky (IRE) 1999	Sadler's Wells; 1981	Northern Dancer	Nearctic
Dam Maryinsky (IRE) 1999	Sadler's Wells; 1981	Northern Dancer	Natalma
Dam Maryinsky (IRE) 1999	Sadler's Wells; 1981	Fairy Bridge	Bold Reason
Dam Maryinsky (IRE) 1999	Sadler's Wells; 1981	Fairy Bridge	Special
Dam Maryinsky (IRE) 1999	Blush With Pride; 1979	Blushing Groom (FR)	Red God
Dam Maryinsky (IRE) 1999	Blush With Pride; 1979	Blushing Groom (FR)	Runaway Bride (GB)
Dam Maryinsky (IRE) 1999	Blush With Pride; 1979	Best in Show	Traffic Judge
Dam Maryinsky (IRE) 1999	Blush With Pride; 1979	Best in Show	Stolen Hour (family: 8-f)

Peeping Fawn is inbred 3 x 3 to Northern Dancer, meaning Northern Dancer appears twice in the third generation of her pedigree. She is also inbred 4 x 4 x 4 to Natalma.
