= Sariska (horse) =

British-bred Thoroughbred racehorse

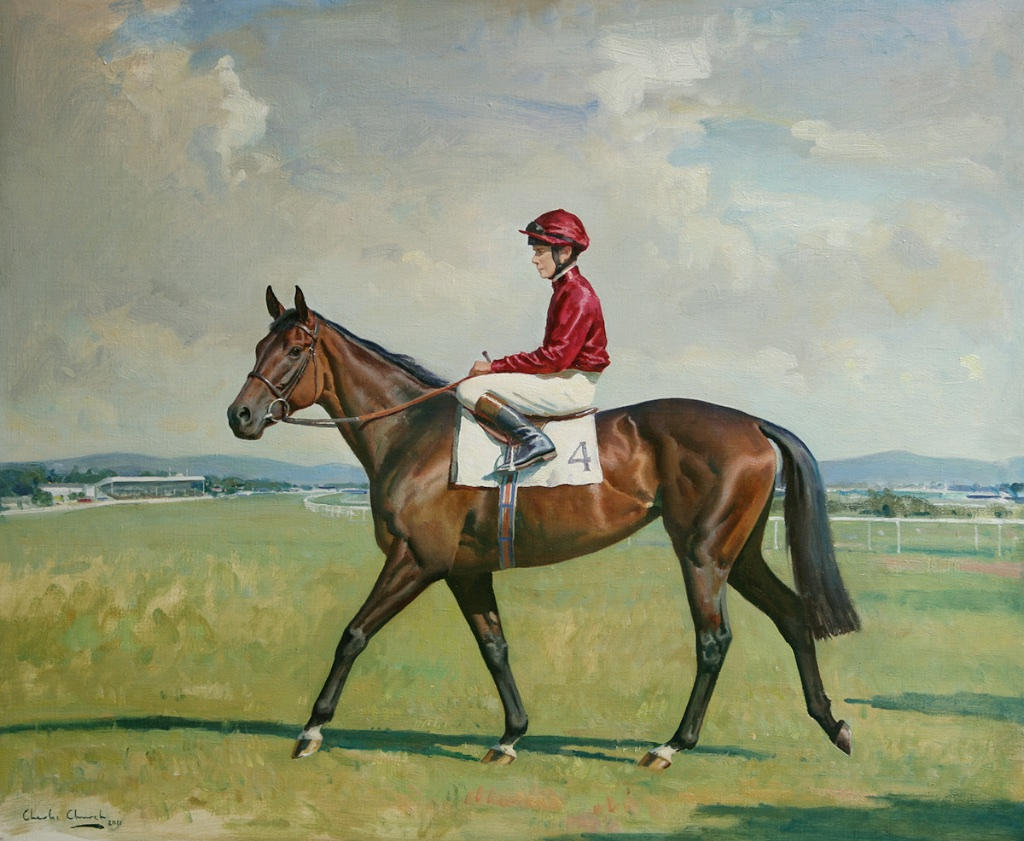
- Sariska: 2009 Epsom Oaks winner and European Champion Three-year-old filly, painting by Charles Church
- Sire: Pivotal
- Grandsire: Polar Falcon
- Dam: Maycocks Bay
- Damsire: Muhtarram
- Sex: Filly
- Foaled: 2006
- Country: Great Britain
- Colour: Bay
- Breeder: Carole, Lady Bamford
- Owner: Carole, Lady Bamford
- Trainer: Michael Bell
- Record: 11: 5-2-1
- Earnings: £728724

Major wins
- Musidora Stakes (2009); Epsom Oaks (2009); Irish Oaks (2009); Middleton Stakes (2010)

Awards
- European Champion 3-Y-O Filly (2009)

Sariska (foaled 14 February 2006, in England) is a British Thoroughbred racehorse. The horse is best known for her win in The Oaks in 2009, a year in which she was named European Champion 3-Y-O Filly.

== Background ==
Bred and raced by Lady Bamford, she was named for the Sariska Tiger Reserve in the Alwar district of the Indian state of Rajasthan. She was trained by Michael Bell.

== Racing career ==
Sariska made her racing debut on 1 November 2008, winning a maiden race for fillies at Newmarket Racecourse. She did not return to the track until 18 April 2009, when she ran fourth to winner Lahaleeb in the Fred Darling Stakes at Newbury Racecourse. In her next start, Sariska won the Musidora Stakes at York Racecourse. Made the betting favourite for The Oaks, under jockey Jamie Spencer, who had ridden her in all of her previous starts, Sariska outfought Midday down the stretch to win the Classic by a short head.

She followed that up with another victory in the Irish Oaks. Her next start was her first against older horses in the Yorkshire Oaks where she went off a short priced favourite only to be out battled by the four-year-old Dar Re Mi, who prevailed by a short head. She then finished third behind Twice Over in her first race against the colts in the Champion Stakes at Newmarket.

Sariska trained on as a four-year old and started her campaign with an easy victory over old rival Midday in the Group Two Middleton Stakes at York. She was then second in Epsom's Group One Coronation Cup, behind Fame and Glory. In the Yorkshire Oaks, Sariska was to face Midday and a younger horse, that season's dual Oaks winner, Snow Fairy. However, Sariska refused to budge from the stalls as the field raced away from her with Midday, a horse she'd beaten three times, winning. This was the first time Sariska had shown any negative temperament in public, although she had nearly killed her trainer Michael Bell a month previously when kicking him with both hooves in the back, narrowly missing his kidneys and sending him flying across the stable.

== Retirement ==
Connections gave her one last chance in the Prix Vermeille at Longchamp, but she again refused to budge from the stalls in a race where Midday again took the honours. After the race, her trainer Michael Bell compared her to "a Ferrari with no keys" due to her appearing to be "in great form" but refusing to run. Sariska was then retired. She is currently a broodmare at Daylesford Stud and was bred to Galileo in 2011 for a 2012 foal.

Stud Record

- 2013 Snow Moon (GB) : Bay filly, foaled 25 February, by Oasis Dream (GB) - won once and placed third from 2 starts to date in England 2015–16.
- 2015 Foaled a colt by Frankel (GB)
- 2016 Covered by Dubawi (IRE)

== Pedigree ==
Pedigree of Sariska
| Sire Pivotal | Polar Falcon | Nureyev | Northern Dancer |
| Sire Pivotal | Polar Falcon | Nureyev | Special |
| Sire Pivotal | Polar Falcon | Marie D'Argonne | Jefferson |
| Sire Pivotal | Polar Falcon | Marie D'Argonne | Mohair |
| Sire Pivotal | Fearless Revival | Cozzene | Caro |
| Sire Pivotal | Fearless Revival | Cozzene | Ride The Rails |
| Sire Pivotal | Fearless Revival | Stufida | Bustino |
| Sire Pivotal | Fearless Revival | Stufida | Zerbinetta |
| Dam Maycocks Bay | Muhtarram | Alleged | Hoist The Flag |
| Dam Maycocks Bay | Muhtarram | Alleged | Princess Pout |
| Dam Maycocks Bay | Muhtarram | Ballet de France | Northern Dancer |
| Dam Maycocks Bay | Muhtarram | Ballet de France | Fabulous Native |
| Dam Maycocks Bay | Beacon | High Top | Derring-Do |
| Dam Maycocks Bay | Beacon | High Top | Camenae |
| Dam Maycocks Bay | Beacon | Mountain Lodge | Blakeney |
| Dam Maycocks Bay | Beacon | Mountain Lodge | Fiddlededee |
