= Olwyn =

British-bred Thoroughbred racehorse

- Sire: Relko
- Grandsire: Tanerko
- Dam: Nantahalah
- Damsire: Nantallah
- Sex: Mare
- Foaled: 1974
- Country: United Kingdom
- Colour: Bay
- Breeder: Dollanstown Stud
- Owner: Souren Vanian
- Trainer: Ron Boss
- Record: 12: 1-4-1

Major wins
- Irish Oaks (1977)

Awards
- Timeform rating 106 (1976), 109 (1977)

Olwyn (1974 – after 1990) was a British Thoroughbred racehorse and broodmare best known for her win in the 1977 Irish Oaks. A daughter of The Derby winner Relko she won once from twelve races in 1976 and 1977. She finished no better than third in four starts as a two-year-old, but showed promising form in the spring of 1977, finishing second in the Pretty Polly Stakes and the Lancashire Oaks. After failing to win in her first nine races she recorded her first and only victory when narrowly winning a poorly contested Irish Oaks in July 1977. She was well beaten in two subsequent races and retired at the end of the year. She made little impression as a broodmare.

== Background ==
Olwyn was a big, strong bay mare with a small white star bred in the United Kingdom by the Dollanstown Stud. She was sired by Relko, the French-trained winner of the 1963 Epsom Derby. Relko was not a conspicuous success as a sire of winners, although several of his daughters made an impact as broodmares. Olwyn was the second foal of her dam Nantahalah, who, as a descendant of the broodmare Never Again, was related to Al Bahathri and her son Haafhd.

As a yearling Olwyn was sent to the sales and was bought for 3,000 guineas by representatives of Souren Vanian, a French-Armenian arms dealer. The filly was sent into training with Ron Boss at his Phoenix Lodge stable at Newmarket, Suffolk. Boss had ridden for Noel Murless in the 1950s and then worked as head lad for his fellow Welshman Ifor Lewis before taking out a trainer's license in 1972.

== Racing career ==
=== 1976: two-year-old season ===
Olwyn failed to win in her first three starts, producing her best effort when finishing third to the Queen's colt Card Player over seven furlongs at Newmarket Racecourse. Despite her unremarkable form the filly was moved up sharply in class for her fourth and final appearance of the season when she was sent to France to contest the Group One Critérium des Pouliches over 1600 metres at Longchamp Racecourse on 3 October. Ridden by Joe Mercer she started a 59/1 outsider but exceeded expectations as she finished sixth of the fourteen runners, less than six lengths behind the winner Kamicia.

=== 1977: three-year-old season ===
On her three-year-old debut Olwyn ran second to the Queen's filly Dunfermline in the Pretty Polly Stakes at Newmarket in April, finishing four lengths behind the winner. After finishing second in the Warwick Oaks, the filly was moved up in class for the 199th running of the Oaks Stakes at Epsom Downs Racecourse and finished ninth of the thirteen runners behind Dunfermline. When dropped back in class for a maiden race at Bath Racecourse she started odds-on favourite but finished second. In the Lancashire Oaks at Haydock Park Racecourse in July she proved no match for the Peter Walwyn-trained Busaca and was beaten four lengths into second place by the winner who went on to beat Dunfermline in the Yorkshire Oaks.

Olwyn was then sent to Ireland for the Irish Oaks over one and a half miles at the Curragh on 16 July in which she was ridden by the lightweight jockey John "Kipper" Lynch. In an eight-runner field described as "one of the poorest ever assembled for a classic" the Dermot Weld-trained Nanticious was made the 4/6 favourite after beating Busaca on soft ground in the Ribblesdale Stakes at Royal Ascot. High Charge, who had finished ahead of Olwyn at Epsom was next in the betting on 7/1 ahead of Lady North (fifth in the Irish 1000 Guineas) with Olwyn fourth choice on 11/1. Lynch sent Olwyn into the lead and was never headed: she held on despite hanging to the right in the closing stages to win by a short head and a head from Sassabunda and Nanticious.

Olwyn returned to England for the St Leger Stakes over fourteen and a half furlongs at Doncaster Racecourse in December and finished sixth of the thirteen runners behind Dunfermline and Alleged after behaving poorly before the start. A week later she was ridden by Lester Piggott and started a 22/1 outsider for the Prix Vermeille at Longchamp. She was in contention until the final turn but finished unplaced behind Kamicia.

Olwyn was sent to the Newmarket sales in December and was sold for 77,000 guineas.

== Assessment and awards ==
There was no International Classification of European two-year-olds in 1976: the official handicappers of Britain, Ireland and France compiled separate rankings for horses which competed in those countries. Olwyn was not given a rating in either the British or French handicaps. The independent Timeform organisation gave her a rating of 106, twenty-four pounds behind their top-rated two-year-old filly Cloonlara: in their annual Racehorses of 1976 they said that she would "probably stay 1½m".

In 1977 Timeform rated her on 109, twenty-four pounds behind their best three-year-old filly Dunfermline. In the Irish handicap for three-year-olds she was given a rating of 75, five pounds inferior to the top fillies Nanticious and Lady Capulet.

== Breeding record ==
Olwyn produced at least ten foals and three winner between 1979 and 1990:

- Overboard, a bay colt, foaled in 1979, sired by Nonoalco. Ran 27 times: winner.
- Okeanos, brown colt, 1981, by Blakeney. Ran 13 times, winner.
- Mufrij, brown colt, 1982, by Nureyev. Failed to win in two races.
- Ormilia, filly, 1983, by Mill Reef. Failed to win in four races
- Oraia, filly, 1984, by Known Fact. Ran four times, winner.
- Overturn, bay colt, 1985, by Cure the Blues. Unraced.
- Omiros, colt, 1986, by Known Fact. Unraced.
- Only Glitter, bay filly, 1987, by Crystal Glitters. Unraced.
- Sentimental Mood, filly, 1988, by Dunbeath. Failed to win in five races.
- Lamloum, filly, 1990, by Vacarme. Failed to win in six races.

== Pedigree ==
Pedigree of Olwyn, bay mare, 1974
Sire Relko (GB) 1960	Tanerko (FR); 1953	Tantieme	Deux Pour Cent
Sire Relko (GB) 1960	Tanerko (FR); 1953	Tantieme	Terka
Sire Relko (GB) 1960	Tanerko (FR); 1953	La Divine	Fair Copy
Sire Relko (GB) 1960	Tanerko (FR); 1953	La Divine	La Diva
Sire Relko (GB) 1960	Relance (FR); 1952	Relic	War Relic
Sire Relko (GB) 1960	Relance (FR); 1952	Relic	Bridal Colors
Sire Relko (GB) 1960	Relance (FR); 1952	Polaire	Le Volcan
Sire Relko (GB) 1960	Relance (FR); 1952	Polaire	Stella Polaris
Dam Nantahalah (USA) 1967	Nantallah (USA); 1953	Nasrullah	Nearco
Dam Nantahalah (USA) 1967	Nantallah (USA); 1953	Nasrullah	Mumtaz Begum
Dam Nantahalah (USA) 1967	Nantallah (USA); 1953	Shimmer	Flares
Dam Nantahalah (USA) 1967	Nantallah (USA); 1953	Shimmer	Broad Ripple
Dam Nantahalah (USA) 1967	Second Edition (USA); 1958	Alibhai	Hyperion
Dam Nantahalah (USA) 1967	Second Edition (USA); 1958	Alibhai	Teresina
Dam Nantahalah (USA) 1967	Second Edition (USA); 1958	Pocket Edition	Roman
Dam Nantahalah (USA) 1967	Second Edition (USA); 1958	Pocket Edition	Never Again (Family 9-e)
