= Alexandrova (horse) =

Irish-bred Thoroughbred racehorse

- Racing silks of Susan Magnier
- Sire: Sadler's Wells
- Grandsire: Northern Dancer
- Dam: Shouk
- Damsire: Shirley Heights
- Sex: Filly
- Foaled: 2003
- Country: Ireland
- Colour: Bay
- Breeder: Quay Bloodstock
- Owner: Magnier, Tabor, Smith
- Trainer: Aidan O'Brien
- Record: 9: 4-2-2
- Earnings: £652,264

Major wins
- Epsom Oaks (2006); Irish Oaks (2006); Yorkshire Oaks (2006)
- Last updated on 27 September 2006

Alexandrova (foaled 23 April 2003) is an Irish Thoroughbred racehorse best known for winning The Oaks, Irish Oaks and Yorkshire Oaks in 2006.

== Background ==
Alexandrova is a bay filly bred by Quay Bloodstock in Ireland. She was by Sadler's Wells, fourteen time Leading sire in Great Britain and Ireland, and became his twelfth and last English Classic winner. She also became his fifth Oaks Stakes winner, following Salsabil, Intrepidity, Moonshell and Imagine, putting the stallion alongside the late-nineteenth century and early-twentieth century stallion St. Simon as the joint most successful sire of winners of this British classic. She is the fourth winner out of the mare Shouk, whose sire is Shirley Heights.

Alexandrova was purchased on behalf of a Coolmore partnership for 420,000 guineas at the Tattersalls October Yearling Sales in 2004. She raced under the colours of Susan Magnier, Michael Tabor and Derrick Smith, and was trained by Aidan O'Brien. She was ridden by Kieren Fallon in all but one of her starts.

== Race Record ==
As a two-year-old in 2005, Alexandrova finished sixth in her debut at the Curragh in June, third at Goodwood in July and first at Tralee in August. She was then entered in the Group 1 Fillies' Mile at Newmarket, finishing second by a head to Nannina.

In May 2006, Alexandrova had a "spectacular" gallop at Ballydoyle, resulting in her becoming the early 4-1 favourite for The Oaks. She started her three-year-old campaign on May 17 by finishing second to Short Skirt in the Musidora Stakes after clipping heels near the start. In the Oaks, Alexandrova settled into second last in the early running, then swept to the lead with over three furlongs remaining. She won easily by six lengths over Rising Cross, with Short Skirt in third and 1000 Guineas winner Speciosa in fourth. "She just took off with me", said Fallon. "Any filly that wins in the Oaks is very special, and I've been lucky enough to win it three times before today, but I never thought until today that I'd get a feel from a filly in the Oaks like I did from Ouija Board two years ago."

In July, Alexandrova gave O'Brien his first win in the Irish Oaks with a four-length victory. O'Brien said, "She has an electric turn of speed that I have never seen from a filly and she has an amazing '0-60'. You don't mind if they go fast or slow as her change of speed is so rapid. She is really special."

For the Yorkshire Oaks in August, Alexandrova was ridden by jockey Michael Kinane as Fallon was banned from riding in England due to a betting scandal. Facing older fillies and mares for the first time, she settled in last behind a slow pace then swept to the lead to win by 3 1/2 lengths. O'Brien said, "She has unbelievable class. When they go slow like that and then kick from the front it can be hard to pick them up but she has that extra gear." She was the first filly to win complete the Epsom, Irish and Yorkshire Oaks triple since 1999.

Alexandrova finished the season with a third-place finish in the Prix de l'Opéra to Mandesha. O'Brien said, "Alexandrova never travelled in the Prix de l'Opéra at any stage, and it just wasn't her for some reason. For a filly with a lot of speed that shouldn't have been the case, and she came back sore after France." She was given a Timeform Rating of 123, just one below top-rated filly Mandesha.

Alexandrova was expected to return to racing at age four, but pulled a muscle before a scheduled start in August 2007 and never raced again.

== Breeding record ==
As of 2016, Alexandrova has produced five named foals:

- 2009 Drops — Bay filly, foaled 12 January, by Kingmambo (USA) – placed once from 4 starts in Ireland 2011–12.
- 2010 Bella Qatara — Bay filly, foaled 6 February, by Dansili (GB) – won once from 4 starts in France 2013.
- 2011 Alex My Boy — Bay colt, foaled 2 February, by Dalakhani (IRE) – won 5 races including G2 Prix Kergorlay at Deauville and G3 Prix de Barbeville at Longchamp and placed 5 times including 2nd G3 Oleander-Rennen at Hoppegarten, 2nd LR March Stakes at Goodwood and 2nd LR Prix Right Royal at Saint-Cloud from 15 starts in Britain, France and Germany 2013–16.
- 2012 Fonteyn — Bay filly, foaled 16 March, by Oasis Dream – died while in training at age two.
- 2013 Somehow — Bay filly, foaled 6 April, by Fastnet Rock (AUS) – won 5 races including G2 Dahlia Stakes at Newmarket; G3 Snow Fairy Fillies' Stakes at the Curragh; LR Cheshire Oaks at Chester; LR Victor McCalmont Memorial Stakes at Gowran Park and placed four times including 2nd G3 Give Thanks Stakes at Cork; 2nd G3 Park Express Stakes at Naas and 4th G1 Oaks S at Epsom from 10 starts to date (7/05/17) in Ireland and England 2015–17

== Pedigree ==
Pedigree of Alexandrova, filly, 2003
Sire Sadler's Wells 1981	Northern Dancer; 1961	Nearctic	Nearco
Sire Sadler's Wells 1981	Northern Dancer; 1961	Nearctic	Lady Angela
Sire Sadler's Wells 1981	Northern Dancer; 1961	Natalma	Native Dancer
Sire Sadler's Wells 1981	Northern Dancer; 1961	Natalma	Almahmoud
Sire Sadler's Wells 1981	Fairy Bridge; 1975	Bold Reason	Hail to Reason
Sire Sadler's Wells 1981	Fairy Bridge; 1975	Bold Reason	Lalun
Sire Sadler's Wells 1981	Fairy Bridge; 1975	Special	Forli
Sire Sadler's Wells 1981	Fairy Bridge; 1975	Special	Thong
Dam Shouk 1994	Shirley Heights; 1975	Mill Reef	Never Bend
Dam Shouk 1994	Shirley Heights; 1975	Mill Reef	Milan Mill
Dam Shouk 1994	Shirley Heights; 1975	Hardiemma	Hardicanute
Dam Shouk 1994	Shirley Heights; 1975	Hardiemma	Grand Cross
Dam Shouk 1994	Souk; 1988	Ahonoora	Lorenzaccio
Dam Shouk 1994	Souk; 1988	Ahonoora	Helen Nichols
Dam Shouk 1994	Souk; 1988	Soumana	Pharly
Dam Shouk 1994	Souk; 1988	Soumana	Faizebad (family: 21-a)
