= Busaca =

French-bred Thoroughbred racehorse

- Sire: Busted
- Grandsire: Crepello
- Dam: Saraca
- Damsire: Shantung
- Sex: Mare
- Foaled: 8 March 1974
- Country: France
- Colour: Bay
- Breeder: Dollanstown Stud
- Owner: Marianne Esterhazy
- Trainer: Peter Walwyn
- Record: 8: 5-1-0

Major wins
- Lancashire Oaks (1977); Yorkshire Oaks (1977)

Awards
- Timeform rating 122 (1977)

Busaca (8 March 1974 – after 1983) was a French-bred, British-trained Thoroughbred racehorse and broodmare. Racing only as a three-year-old she won five of her eight races and was rated one of the best British fillies of her generation over middle and long distances. After winning three minor races in spring she finished second in the Ribblesdale Stakes and then recorded her first major win when taking the Lancashire Oaks at Haydock Park in July. In the following month she moved up to the highest class to win the Yorkshire Oaks over a field which included The Oaks winner Dunfermline. She was retired from racing after finishing fourth in the Prix Vermeille but had no success as a broodmare.

== Background ==
Busaca was a bay mare with no white markings bred in France by the County Kildare-based Dollanstown Stud. She was sired by Busted who won the Eclipse Stakes and King George VI & Queen Elizabeth Stakes in 1967, a year in which he was voted British Horse of the Year. As a breeding stallion he sired many major winners including Bustino, Mtoto and Erins Isle. Busaca's dam Saraca was a top-class French racemare who won the Prix Vermeille and finished second in the Prix de Diane in 1969. She was a descendant of the influential broodmare Lost Soul, the ancestor of many leading turf performers including Hethersett, Doyoun and Neasham Belle.

During her racing career, Busaca was owned by Marianne Esterhazy and trained by Peter Walwyn at Seven Barrows, near Lambourn in Berkshire.

== Racing career ==
=== 1977: three-year-old season ===
Busaca was unraced as a two-year-old and began her racing career in the spring of 1977 by finishing unplaced in a seven furlong maiden race. She recorded her first win in a maiden over ten furlongs at Sandown Park Racecourse and followed up in a minor event over one and a half miles at Salisbury Racecourse. She then completed a hat-trick when winning a handicap race over one and a half miles at Kempton Park Racecourse on 21 May, before being moved up in class for the Group Two Ribblesdale Stakes at Royal Ascot. The race saw her matched against Triple First, a filly who had won the May Hill Stakes and the Musidora Stakes before finishing fourth to Dunfermline in The Oaks. She proved the best of the British fillies, but was beaten four lengths into second place by the Irish-trained Nanticious. In July she faced four opponents in what appeared to be a weakly-contested race for the Group Three Lancashire Oaks at Haydock Park. Ridden by Pat Eddery, she started the 1/2 favourite, took the lead a quarter of a mile from the finish, and won easily by four lengths from Olwyn. Later that month, the form of the race was boosted when Olwyn recorded an upset victory over Nanticious and six others in the Group One Irish Oaks (a race which had been considered as a target for Busaca).

In August Busaca, with Eddery again in the saddle, started at odds of 5/1 for the Group One Yorkshire Oaks over one and a half miles on firm ground at York Racecourse. Her opponents included Dunfermline, Triple First (who had won the Nassau Stakes at Goodwood), Sassabunda (runner-up in the Irish Oaks), Royal Hive and the leading Polish three-year-old Konstelacja. Busaca was always among the leaders in a slowly-run race before going to the front half a mile from the finish. She stayed on strongly in the straight to win by a length from Royal Hive, with Dunfermline five lengths back in third. Busaca was then sent to France for the Group One Prix Vermeille over 2400 metres at Longchamp Racecourse on 18 September. The race was won by the locally trained Kamicia, with Busaca losing out in a three-way photo-finish for second against Royal Hive and Fabuleux Jane. The unplaced fillies included Trillion, Nanticious and Olwyn.

== Assessment ==
In the official International Classification for 1977, Busaca was rated the sixth-best three-year-old filly in Europe behind Dunfermline, Madelia, Trillion, Kamicia and Mrs McArdy. The independent Timeform organisation gave Busaca a rating of 122 in 1977, making her eleven pounds inferior to their top-rated three-year-old filly Dunfermline. In their annual Racehorses of 1977 they described her a strong filly, who would have done even better if campaigned over longer distances.

== Breeding record ==
Busaca was retired from racing to become a broodmare at the Dollanstown Stud. She had very little success, producing two confirmed foals, neither of whom appeared on the racecourse:

- Heeria, a bay filly, foaled in 1979, sired by Habitat. Unraced.
- Elsaca, bay filly, 1983, by Ela-Mana-Mou. Unraced.

== Pedigree ==
Pedigree of Busaca bay mare, 1974
| Sire Busted (GB) 1963 | Crepello (GB); 1954 | Donatello | Bleheim |
| Sire Busted (GB) 1963 | Crepello (GB); 1954 | Donatello | Delleana |
| Sire Busted (GB) 1963 | Crepello (GB); 1954 | Crepuscule | Mieuxce |
| Sire Busted (GB) 1963 | Crepello (GB); 1954 | Crepuscule | Red Sunset |
| Sire Busted (GB) 1963 | Sans le Sou (IRE); 1957 | Vimy | Wild Risk |
| Sire Busted (GB) 1963 | Sans le Sou (IRE); 1957 | Vimy | Mimi |
| Sire Busted (GB) 1963 | Sans le Sou (IRE); 1957 | Martial Loan | Court Martial |
| Sire Busted (GB) 1963 | Sans le Sou (IRE); 1957 | Martial Loan | Loan |
| Dam Saraca (GB) 1966 | Shantung (FR); 1956 | Sicambre | Prince Bio |
| Dam Saraca (GB) 1966 | Shantung (FR); 1956 | Sicambre | Sif |
| Dam Saraca (GB) 1966 | Shantung (FR); 1956 | Barley Corn | Hyperion |
| Dam Saraca (GB) 1966 | Shantung (FR); 1956 | Barley Corn | Schiaparelli |
| Dam Saraca (GB) 1966 | Hevea (FR); 1961 | Herbager | Vandale |
| Dam Saraca (GB) 1966 | Hevea (FR); 1961 | Herbager | Flagette |
| Dam Saraca (GB) 1966 | Hevea (FR); 1961 | Princesse Reine | Prince Chevalier |
| Dam Saraca (GB) 1966 | Hevea (FR); 1961 | Princesse Reine | Kingscavil (Family 21-a) |
