= Cheshire Oaks (horse race) =

Flat horse race in Britain

- Class: Listed
- Location: Chester Racecourse; Chester, England
- Inaugurated: 1950
- Race type: Flat / Thoroughbred
- Sponsor: Weatherbys
- Website: Chester

Race information
- Distance: 1m 3f 75y (2,281 m)
- Surface: Turf
- Track: Left-handed
- Qualification: Three-year-old fillies
- Weight: 9 st 2 lb Penalties; 5 lb for Group winners * 3 lb for Listed winners * * after 31 August 2024
- Purse: £120,000 (2025); 1st: £67,224

Cheshire Oaks
2026
Amelia Earhart	I'm The One	A La Prochaine

Previous years
2025
Minnie Hauk	Secret Of Love	Caspi Star
2024
Forest Fairy	Port Fairy	Seaward
2023
Savethelastdance	There's The Door	Ermesinde
2022
Thoughts Of June	Above The Curve	Typewriter
2021
Dubai Fountain	Zeyaadah	Nicest

2020-2011
2019
Mehdaayih	Manuela De Vega	Fanny Logan
2018
Magic Wand	Forever Together	Princess Yaiza
2017
Enable	Alluringly	Tansholpan
2016
Somehow	Moorside	Diamonds Pour Moi
2015
Diamondsandrubies	Entertainment	Zamoura
2014
Anipa	Secret Pursuit	Bright Approach
2013
Banoffee	Gertrude Versed	Jathabah
2012
Good Morning Star	Betterbetterbetter	Cubanita
2011
Wonder of Wonders	Blaise Chorus	Fork Handles

2010-2001
2010
Gertrude Bell	Acquainted	Champagnelifestyle
2009
Perfect Truth	Phillipina	Roses For The Lady
2008
Sail	Sugar Mint	Changing Skies
2007
Light Shift	All My Loving	Fashion Statement
2006
Time On	Mont Etoile	Prowess
2005
Alumni	Higher Love	Tincture
2004
Hidden Hope	Menhoubah	Crystal Curling
2003
Hammiya	Halawanda	Snippets
2002
Shadow Dancing	Bright And Clear	Sunray Superstar
2001
Rockerlong	Gay Heroine	Elrehaan

2000-1991
2000
Solaia	Inforapenny	Tanzilla
1999
Valentine Girl	Signorina Cattiva	Pinnacle
1998
High And Low	Rambling Rose	Due South
1997
Kyle Rhea	Grapevine	Apache Star
1996
Tout A Coup	Solar Crystal	Shemozzle
1995
Dance A Dream	Yarn	Najmat Alshemaal
1994
Bolas	State Crystal	Hawajiss
1993
Abury	Bashayer	Magical Retreat
1992
Aquamarine	Juniper Berry	Tradition
1991
Peplum	Conor Lily	North Wind

1990-1989
1990
Pharian	Ruby Tiger	Wajna
1989
Braiswick	By Charter	Sharka

The Cheshire Oaks is a Listed flat horse race in Great Britain open to three-year-old fillies. It is run over a distance of 1 mile, 3 furlongs and 75 yards (2,281 metres) at Chester in May.

== History ==
The event was established in 1950, and it was originally contested over 1 mile, 4 furlongs and 53 yards. The inaugural running was won by Requete.

The Cheshire Oaks was extended by several yards in 1970. It held Group 3 status from 1971 to 1985. It was relegated to Listed level in 1986.

The race was scheduled to be run over 1 mile, 4 furlongs and 65 yards in 1988, but it was abandoned due to waterlogging. It was cut by about a furlong in 1989.

The current trophy is named in memory of Robert Sangster (1936–2004), a successful owner-breeder of racehorses. The Robert Sangster Memorial Cup was first presented in 2005.

The Cheshire Oaks can serve as a trial for the Epsom Oaks. The last horse to win both races was Minnie Hauk in 2025.

== Records ==
Leading jockey (8 wins):

- Ryan Moore - Wonder of Wonders (2011), Diamondsandrubies (2015), Somehow (2016), Magic Wand (2018), Thoughts Of June (2022), Savethelastdance (2023), Minnie Hauk (2025), Amelia Earhart (2026)

Leading trainer (10 wins):

- Aidan O'Brien - Sail (2008), Perfect Truth (2009), Wonder Of Wonders (2011), Diamondsandrubies (2015), Somehow (2016), Magic Wand (2018), Thoughts Of June (2022), Savethelastdance (2023), Minnie Hauk (2025), Amelia Earhart (2026)

== Winners ==
Year	Winner	Jockey	Trainer	Time
1950	Requete	Brendan Duffy	Darby Rogers	2:45.40
1951	Queen Of Sheba	Neville Sellwood	Atty Persse	2:44.00
1952	Good Earth II	Jacques Doyasbere	François Mathet	2:45.00
1953	Brolly	Bill Rickaby	Jack Jarvis	2:39.00
1954	Amora	Edgar Britt	Charles Elsey	2:47.20
1955	Lark	Bill Rickaby	Jack Jarvis	2:50.60
1956	Fairy Grove	Harry Carr	Cecil Boyd-Rochfort	2:38.80
1957	Mulberry Harbour	Harry Carr	Cecil Boyd-Rochfort	2:44.00
1958	Scryer	Geoff Littlewood	Geoffrey Barling	2:39.80
1959	Cantelo	Eddie Hide	Charles Elsey	2:41.40
1960	Courtesan	Tony Rawlinson	Jack Fawcus	2:38.00
1961	Bernie	Harry Carr	Robert Ward	2:56.80
1962	Tropic Star	Eph Smith	Boggy Whelan	2:46.20
1963	Elite Royale	Geoff Lewis	Boggy Whelan	2:43.00
1964	Paddy's Song	Joe Sime	Sam Hall	2:44.00
1965	Bell Top	Joe Mercer	Dick Hern	2:51.60
1966	Lucaya	Eddie Hide	Bill Elsey	2:47.20
1967	Pink Gem	George Moore	Noel Murless	2:52.80
1968	Hardiesse	Sandy Barclay	Noel Murless	2:51.40
1969	Abandoned due to waterlogging
1970	Lupe	Sandy Barclay	Noel Murless	2:48.00
1971	Yelda	Tony Murray	Noel Murless	2:40.00
1972	Coral Beach	Willie Carson	Bernard van Cutsem	2:49.60
1973	Milly Moss	Geoff Lewis	Noel Murless	2:42.00
1974	Dibidale	Willie Carson	Barry Hills	2:45.67
1975	One Over Parr	Pat Eddery	Peter Walwyn	2:40.88
1976	African Dancer	Pat Eddery	Harry Wragg	2:48.48
1977	Brightly	Geoff Lewis	Bruce Hobbs	2:50.77
1978	Princess Eboli	Geoff Lewis	Bruce Hobbs	2:46.17
1979	L'Ile Du Reve	Joe Mercer	Henry Cecil	2:52.70
1980	Shoot A Line	Willie Carson	Dick Hern	2:37.38
1981	Hunston	Geoff Baxter	Bruce Hobbs	2:48.10
1982	Swiftfoot	Willie Carson	Dick Hern	2:40.57
1983	Abandoned due to waterlogging
1984	Malaak	Walter Swinburn	Michael Stoute	2:42.08
1985	Helenetta	Steve Cauthen	Geoff Wragg	2:43.31
1986	Salchow	Willie Carson	Dick Hern	2:47.31
1987	Chaudennay	Cash Asmussen	Barry Hills	2:37.34
1988	Abandoned due to waterlogging
1989	Braiswick	Pat Eddery	Geoff Wragg	2:23.71
1990	Pharian	Michael Roberts	Clive Brittain	2:31.40
1991	Peplum	Pat Eddery	Henry Cecil	2:31.42
1992	Aquamarine	Paul Eddery	Barry Hills	2:25.79
1993	Abury	John Reid	Peter Chapple-Hyam	2:25.21
1994	Bolas	Pat Eddery	Barry Hills	2:23.80
1995	Dance a Dream	Walter Swinburn	Michael Stoute	2:25.07
1996	Tout a Coup	Michael Kinane	Gerry Cusack	2:26.50
1997	Kyle Rhea	Kieren Fallon	Henry Cecil	2:36.37
1998	High and Low	Darryll Holland	Barry Hills	2:29.49
1999	Valentine Girl	Pat Eddery	Barry Hills	2:25.02
2000	Solaia	Jimmy Fortune	Paul Cole	2:26.35
2001	Rockerlong	Darryll Holland	Geoff Wragg	2:22.55
2002	Shadow Dancing	Martin Dwyer	Marcus Tregoning	2:24.07
2003	Hammiya	Willie Supple	Marcus Tregoning	2:25.49
2004	Hidden Hope	Ted Durcan	Geoff Wragg	2:27.30
2005	Alumni	Richard Hughes	Barry Hills	2:31.04
2006	Time On	Frankie Dettori	John Dunlop	2:26.06
2007	Light Shift	Ted Durcan	Henry Cecil	2:22.99
2008	Sail	Johnny Murtagh	Aidan O'Brien	2:27.92
2009	Perfect Truth	Johnny Murtagh	Aidan O'Brien	2:22.17
2010	Gertrude Bell	William Buick	John Gosden	2:26.98
2011	Wonder of Wonders	Ryan Moore	Aidan O'Brien	2:24.81
2012	Good Morning Star	Franny Norton	Mark Johnston	2:31.87
2013	Banoffee	Kieren Fallon	Hughie Morrison	2:23.77
2014	Anipa	Andrea Atzeni	Roger Varian	2:25.48
2015	Diamondsandrubies	Ryan Moore	Aidan O'Brien	2:30.34
2016	Somehow	Ryan Moore	Aidan O'Brien	2:29.05
2017	Enable	Frankie Dettori	John Gosden	2:23.80
2018	Magic Wand	Ryan Moore	Aidan O'Brien	2:28.61
2019	Mehdaayih	Robert Havlin	John Gosden	2:31.51
	no race 2020 (Note: The 2020 running was cancelled because of the COVID-19 pandemic in the United Kingdom)
2021	Dubai Fountain	Franny Norton	Mark Johnston	2:32.72
2022	Thoughts Of June	Ryan Moore	Aidan O'Brien	2:31.64
2023	Savethelastdance	Ryan Moore	Aidan O'Brien	2:36.64
2024	Forest Fairy	Rossa Ryan	Ralph Beckett	2:28.27
2025	Minnie Hauk	Ryan Moore	Aidan O'Brien	2:29.15
2026	Amelia Earhart	Ryan Moore	Aidan O'Brien	2:26:31

== See also ==
- Horse racing in Great Britain
- List of British flat horse races
