= Winifreda (horse) =

British-bred Thoroughbred racehorse

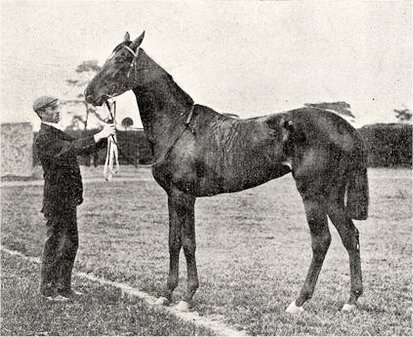
- Winifreda in 1900.
- Sire: St Simon
- Grandsire: Galopin
- Dam: Melody
- Damsire: Tynedale
- Sex: Mare
- Foaled: 1897
- Country: United Kingdom
- Colour: Bay
- Breeder: Daniel Cooper
- Owner: Leonard Brassey
- Trainer: Tom Jennings Jr.
- Record: 6: 3-0-0

Major wins
- Richmond Stakes (1899); 1000 Guineas (1900); Coronation Stakes (1900)

Winifreda (1897 – 1912) was a British Thoroughbred racehorse and broodmare. After winning the Richmond Stakes on her only start as a juvenile she took the 1000 Guineas on her three-year-old debut. She disappointed when favourite for the Epsom Oaks but returned to form to win the Coronation Stakes at Royal Ascot. Her career was then interrupted by health problems and she was well beaten in two subsequent races. She made no impact as a broodmare.

== Background ==
Winifreda was a "great, rangey" bay mare with "rare shoulders and depth" bred in England by Sir Daniel Cooper. As a two-year-old in June 1899 she was bought for 3,000 guineas by Leonard Brassey, a senior figure in the Jockey Club. During her racing career she was trained by Tom Jennings Jr at Phantom House stable in Newmarket, Suffolk.

She was sired by St. Simon, an undefeated racehorse who was considered one of the best British runners of the 19th Century. In an outstanding stud career he won nine sires’ championships, having sired ten Classic winners. Her dam Melody was a top-class racemare who won the Woodcote Stakes and the Prince of Wales's Stakes. As a broodmare she also produced St Cecilia, the female-line ancestor of the Melbourne Cup winners Backwood, Piping Lane and Tawrrific.

== Racing career ==
=== 1899: two-year-old season ===
Winifreda made her first and only appearance of 1899 in the Richmond Stakes over six furlongs at Goodwood Racecourse in July, in which she was ridden by Walter Bradford and started 7/4 joint-favourite in a four-runner field. After settling in third place she "shot out" and won by two lengths from Edith Crag and the colt Granite.

=== 1900: three-year-old season ===
On 4 May Winifreda started the 11/2 third choice in the betting in a ten-runner field for the 87th running of the 1000 Guineas over the Rowley Mile at Newmarket Racecourse. Ridden by Sam Loates she settled behind the leaders in the centre of the wide course before moving into the lead inside the last quarter mile. She won in "commanding" fashion by three-quarters of a length from Inuisitive, with two lengths back to the favourite Vain Duchess in third and La Roche in fourth.

In the Epsom Oaks on 1 June, Winifreda started 3/1 joint-favourite alongside Lady Schomberg but looked deeply unimpressive before the start, with one correspondent stating that she had lost a great deal of weight since the Guineas and was exhibiting "signs of wear" to her right foreleg. She made little impact in the race and finished seventh behind La Roche. On 13 June the filly was dropped back in distance for the Coronation Stakes over one mile at Royal Ascot in which she carried top weight of 129 pounds. After being restrained by her rider Thomas Weldon in the early stages she produced a strong finish and dead-heated for first place with Sainte Nitouche following a "sharp battle" in the final strides. She subsequently broke a blood vessel in training and was off the course for four months, missing an intended run in the St Leger.

Winifreda returned to the track on 18 October for the valuable Sandown Foal Plate over ten furlongs. With Loates in the saddle she came home fourth of the seven runners behind Admiral Dewey, a colt to whom she was conceding eleven pounds in weight. She ended her season by finishing unplaced in the Derby Cup at Derby Racecourse over one and a half miles in November.

== Assessment and honours ==
In their book, A Century of Champions, based on the Timeform rating system, John Randall and Tony Morris rated Winifreda an "average" winner of the 1000 Guineas.

== Breeding record ==
Winifreda was retired from racing to become a broodmare for her owner's stud. She appears to have proved difficult to get in foal with her only reported offspring being Silver Greyhound, a bay filly, foaled in 1907, and sired by King's Messenger. She was euthanized in 1912.

== Pedigree ==
Pedigree of Winifreda (GB), bay mare, 1897
Sire St. Simon (GB) 1881	Galopin; 1872	Vedette	Voltigeur
Sire St. Simon (GB) 1881	Galopin; 1872	Vedette	Mrs Ridgeway
Sire St. Simon (GB) 1881	Galopin; 1872	Flying Duchess	The Flying Dutchman
Sire St. Simon (GB) 1881	Galopin; 1872	Flying Duchess	Merope
Sire St. Simon (GB) 1881	St. Angela; 1865	King Tom	Harkaway
Sire St. Simon (GB) 1881	St. Angela; 1865	King Tom	Pocahontas
Sire St. Simon (GB) 1881	St. Angela; 1865	Adeline	Ion
Sire St. Simon (GB) 1881	St. Angela; 1865	Adeline	Little Fairy
Dam Melody (GB) 1888	Tynedale; 1864	Warlock	Birdcatcher (IRE)
Dam Melody (GB) 1888	Tynedale; 1864	Warlock	Elphine
Dam Melody (GB) 1888	Tynedale; 1864	Queen of Tyne	Tomboy
Dam Melody (GB) 1888	Tynedale; 1864	Queen of Tyne	Whisker mare
Dam Melody (GB) 1888	Glee; 1873	Adventurer	Newminster
Dam Melody (GB) 1888	Glee; 1873	Adventurer	Palma
Dam Melody (GB) 1888	Glee; 1873	Sweet Sound	Rataplan
Dam Melody (GB) 1888	Glee; 1873	Sweet Sound	Hybla (Family:3-j)
