= Ryafan =

American-bred Thoroughbred racehorse

- Sire: Lear Fan
- Grandsire: Roberto
- Dam: Carya
- Damsire: Northern Dancer
- Sex: Mare
- Foaled: 8 March 1994
- Country: United States
- Colour: Bay
- Breeder: Juddmonte Farms
- Owner: Khalid Abdulla
- Trainer: John Gosden; Robert Frankel
- Record: 10: 7-0-1
- Earnings: £818,973

Major wins
- Prix Marcel Boussac (1996); Falmouth Stakes (1997); Nassau Stakes (1997); Queen Elizabeth II Challenge Cup Stakes (1997); Yellow Ribbon Stakes (1997); Matriarch Stakes (1997)

Awards
- European Champion Three-year-old filly (1997); American Champion Female Turf Horse (1997)
- Last updated on 19 November 2021

Ryafan was an American-bred, British-trained thoroughbred racehorse.

== Background ==
She was sired by Lear Fan, an American stallion who raced in Europe, winning the Prix Jacques le Marois in 1984. His other progeny included Good Ba Ba and Sikeston.

== Racing career ==
She won a number of prestigious races, including the Falmouth Stakes and the Nassau Stakes in England, the Prix Marcel Boussac in France, and the Queen Elizabeth II Challenge Cup Stakes and the Yellow Ribbon Stakes in the United States of America.

== Breeding record ==
Ryafan produced at least three foals

- Volcanic, a bay colt, foaled in 1999, sired by Zafonic
- Pressure Group, bay colt, 2000, by Sadler's Wells
- Phantom Wind, bay filly, 2001, by Storm Cat
