= Irish Oaks =

Flat horse race in Ireland

- Class: Group 1
- Location: Curragh Racecourse; County Kildare, Ireland
- Inaugurated: 1895
- Race type: Flat / Thoroughbred
- Sponsor: Juddmonte
- Website: Curragh

Race information
- Distance: 1m 4f (2,414 metres)
- Surface: Turf
- Track: Right-handed
- Qualification: Three-year-old fillies
- Weight: 9 st 2 lb
- Purse: €500,000 (2025); 1st: €285,000

Irish Oaks
2026
Johanna Walsh	Inis Mor	Sparan Nua

Previous years
2025
Minnie Hauk	Wemightakedlongway	Island Hopping
2024
You Got To Me	Content	Purple Lily
2023
Savethelastdance	Bluestocking	Library
2022
Magical Lagoon	Toy	Cairde Go Deo
2021
Snowfall	Divinely	Nicest

2020-2011
2020
Even So	Cayenne Pepper	Passion
2019
Star Catcher	Fleeting	Pink Dogwood
2018
Sea of Class	Forever Together	Mary Tudor
2017
Enable	Rain Goddess	Eziyra
2016
Seventh Heaven	Architecture	Harlequeen
2015
Covert Love	Jack Naylor	Curvy
2014
Bracelet	Tapestry	Volume
2013
Chicquita	Venus de Milo	Just Pretending
2012
Great Heavens	Shirocco Star	Princess Highway
2011
Blue Bunting	Banimpire	Wonder Of Wonders

2010-2001
2010
Snow Fairy	Miss Jean Brodie	Lady Lupus
2009
Sariska	Roses For The Lady	Midday
2008
Moonstone	Ice Queen	Gagnoa
2007
Peeping Fawn	Light Shift	All My Loving
2006
Alexandrova	Scottish Stage	Rising Cross
2005
Shawanda	Playful Act	Mona Lisa
2004
Ouija Board	Punctilious	Hazarista
2003
Vintage Tipple	L'Ancresse	Casual Look
2002
Margarula	Quarter Moon	Lady's Secret
2001
Lailani	Mot Juste	Karsavina

2000-1991
2000
Petrushka	Melikah	Inforapenny
1999
Ramruma	Sunspangled	Sister Bella
1998
Winona	Kitza	Bahr
1997
Ebadiyla	Yashmak	Brilliance
1996
Dance Design	Shamadara	Key Change
1995
Pure Grain	Russian Snows	Valley Of Gold
1994
Bolas	Hawajiss	Gothic Dream
1993
Wemyss Bight	Royal Ballerina	Oakmead
1992
User Friendly	Market Booster	Arrikala
1991
Possessive Dancer	Jet Ski Lady	Eileen Jenny

1990-1985
1990
Knight's Baroness	Atoll	Assertion
1989
Alydaress	Aliysa	Petite Ile
1988
Diminuendo	Melodist	Silver Lane
1987
Unite	Bourbon Girl	Eurobird
1986
Colorspin	Fleur Royale	Untold
1985
Helen Street	Alydars Best	Duban

The Irish Oaks is a Group 1 flat horse race in Ireland open to three-year-old thoroughbred fillies. It is run at the Curragh over a distance of 1 mile and 4 furlongs (2,414 metres), and it is scheduled to take place each year in July.

It is Ireland's equivalent of The Oaks, a famous race in England.

== History ==
The event was established in 1895, and it was originally contested over a mile. It was extended to its present length in 1915.

The field usually includes fillies which ran previously in the Epsom Oaks, and several have won both races. The first was Masaka in 1948, and the most recent was Minnie Hauk in 2025.

The leading participants from the Irish Oaks sometimes go on to compete in the following month's Yorkshire Oaks. The last to achieve victory in both events was Minnie Hauk in 2025.

== Records ==
Leading jockey (6 wins):

- Johnny Murtagh – Ebadiyla (1997), Winona (1998), Petrushka (2000), Peeping Fawn (2007), Moonstone (2008), Chicquita (2013)

Leading trainer (8 wins):

- Aidan O'Brien - Alexandrova (2006), Peeping Fawn (2007), Moonstone (2008), Bracelet (2014), Seventh Heaven (2016), Snowfall (2021), Savethelastdance (2023), Minnie Hauk (2025)

Leading owner since 1960 (9 wins): (includes part ownership)

- Susan Magnier – Alexandrova (2006), Peeping Fawn (2007), Moonstone (2008), Bracelet (2014), Seventh Heaven (2016), Even So (2020), Snowfall (2021), Savethelastdance (2023), Minnie Hauk (2025)

== Winners since 1960 ==
Year	Winner	Jockey	Trainer	Owner	Time
1960	Lynchris	Bill Williamson	John Oxx senior	Mrs E. Fawcett
1961	Ambergris	Jimmy Lindley	Harry Wragg	R. More O'Ferrall
1962	French Cream	Bill Rickaby	Geoffrey Brooke	R. Dennis
1963	Hibernia III	Bill Williamson	John Oxx senior	Dr M. Andree
1964	Ancasta	Jack Purtell	Vincent O'Brien	F. Burmann
1965	Aurabella	Liam Ward	Vincent O'Brien	Lt-Col J. Silcock
1966	Merry Mate	Bill Williamson	John Oxx senior	John McShain
1967	Pampalina	Johnny Roe	John Oxx senior	Mrs B. Aitken
1968	Celina	Sandy Barclay'	Noel Murless	Mrs J. Hindley
1969	Gaia	Liam Ward	Vincent O'Brien	Mrs J. Hanes
1970	Santa Tina	Lester Piggott	Charlie Milbank	S. O'Flaherty	2:34.00
1971	Altesse Royale	Geoff Lewis	Noel Murless	Roger Hue-Williams	2:33.60
1972	Regal Exception	Maurice Philipperon	John Fellows	Robin Scully	2:37.90
1973	Dahlia	Bill Pyers	Maurice Zilber	Nelson Bunker Hunt	2:43.00
1974	Dibidale	Willie Carson	Barry Hills	Nick Robinson	2:36.20
1975	Juliette Marny	Lester Piggott	Jeremy Tree	James Morrison	2:33.10
1976	Lagunette	Philippe Paquet	François Boutin	Marius Berghgracht	2:33.10
1977	Olwyn	Kipper Lynch	Ron Boss	Souren Vanian	2:35.10
1978	Fair Salinia (Note: Sorbus finished first in 1978, but she was relegated to second place following a stewards' inquiry)	Greville Starkey	Michael Stoute	Sven Hanson	2:35.20
1979	Godetia	Lester Piggott	Vincent O'Brien	Robert Sangster	2:33.60
1980	Shoot A Line	Willie Carson	Dick Hern	R. A. Budgett	2:32.55
1981	Blue Wind	Wally Swinburn	Dermot Weld	Diana Firestone	2:35.90
1982	Swiftfoot	Willie Carson	Dick Hern	2nd Baron Rotherwick	2:33.80
1983	Give Thanks	Declan Gillespie	Jim Bolger	Mrs Ogden White	2:32.30
1984	Princess Pati	Pat Shanahan	Con Collins	Meg Mullion	2:28.60
1985	Helen Street	Willie Carson	Dick Hern	Sobell / Weinstock	2:39.90
1986	Colorspin	Pat Eddery	Michael Stoute	Helena Springfield Ltd	2:40.90
1987	Unite	Walter Swinburn	Michael Stoute	Sheikh Mohammed	2:34.90
1988 (dh)	Diminuendo; Melodist	Steve Cauthen; Walter Swinburn	Henry Cecil; Michael Stoute	Sheikh Mohammed; Sheikh Mohammed	2:36.40
1989	Alydaress	Michael Kinane	Henry Cecil	Sheikh Mohammed	2:31.20
1990	Knight's Baroness	Richard Quinn	Paul Cole	Prince Fahd bin Salman	2:31.70
1991	Possessive Dancer	Steve Cauthen	Alex Scott	Ahmed Al Maktoum	2:31.10
1992	User Friendly	George Duffield	Clive Brittain	Bill Gredley	2:33.70
1993	Wemyss Bight	Pat Eddery	André Fabre	Khalid Abdullah	2:35.80
1994	Bolas	Pat Eddery	Barry Hills	Khalid Abdullah	2:37.60
1995	Pure Grain	John Reid	Michael Stoute	Robert Barnett	2:33.60
1996	Dance Design	Michael Kinane	Dermot Weld	Moyglare Stud Farm	2:29.70
1997	Ebadiyla	Johnny Murtagh	John Oxx	HH Aga Khan IV	2:33.70
1998	Winona	Johnny Murtagh	John Oxx	Lady Clague	2:39.80
1999	Ramruma	Kieren Fallon	Henry Cecil	Prince Fahd bin Salman	2:33.00
2000	Petrushka	Johnny Murtagh	Sir Michael Stoute	Highclere Racing Ltd	2:31.20
2001	Lailani	Frankie Dettori	Ed Dunlop	Maktoum Al Maktoum	2:30.50
2002	Margarula	Kevin Manning	Jim Bolger	Jackie Bolger	2:37.40
2003	Vintage Tipple	Frankie Dettori	Paddy Mullins	Pat O'Donovan	2:28.30
2004	Ouija Board	Kieren Fallon	Ed Dunlop	19th Earl of Derby	2:28.20
2005	Shawanda	Christophe Soumillon	Alain de Royer-Dupré	Aga Khan IV	2:27.10
2006	Alexandrova	Kieren Fallon	Aidan O'Brien	Magnier / Tabor / Smith	2:29.60
2007	Peeping Fawn	Johnny Murtagh	Aidan O'Brien	Tabor / Magnier	2:39.12
2008	Moonstone	Johnny Murtagh	Aidan O'Brien	Magnier / Tabor / Smith	2:34.37
2009	Sariska	Jamie Spencer	Michael Bell	Lady Bamford	2:45.84
2010	Snow Fairy	Ryan Moore	Ed Dunlop	Anamoine Ltd	2:34.87
2011	Blue Bunting	Frankie Dettori	Mahmood Al Zarooni	Godolphin	2:42.97
2012	Great Heavens	William Buick	John Gosden	Lady Rothschild	2:42.92
2013	Chicquita	Johnny Murtagh	Alain de Royer-Dupré	Paul Makin	2:35.01
2014	Bracelet	Colm O'Donoghue	Aidan O'Brien	Tabor / Magnier / Smith	2:33.68
2015	Covert Love	Pat Smullen	Hugo Palmer	Fomo Syndicate	2:30.38
2016	Seventh Heaven	Seamie Heffernan	Aidan O'Brien	Smith / Magnier / Tabor	2:34.53
2017	Enable	Frankie Dettori	John Gosden	Khalid Abdullah	2:32.13
2018	Sea of Class	James Doyle	William Haggas	Sunderland Holding Inc	2:32.54
2019	Star Catcher	Frankie Dettori	John Gosden	Anthony Oppenheimer	2:34.49
2020	Even So	Colin Keane	Ger Lyons	Magnier / Paul Shanahan	2:39.54
2021	Snowfall	Ryan Moore	Aidan O'Brien	Smith / Magnier / Tabor	2:34.36
2022	Magical Lagoon	Shane Foley	Jessica Harrington	Zhang Yuesheng	2:34.02
2023	Savethelastdance	Ryan Moore	Aidan O'Brien	Magnier /Tabor / Smith / Westerberg	2:43.11
2024	You Got To Me	Hector Crouch	Ralph Beckett	Valmont & Newsells Park Stud Bldstk 24	2:32.61
2025	Minnie Hauk	Ryan Moore	Aidan O'Brien	Smith / Magnier /Tabor	2:33.62
2026	Johanna Walsh	Dylan Browne McMonagle	Joseph O'Brien	Wells Watson	2:28.49

== Earlier winners ==
- 1895: Sapling
- 1896: Kosmos
- 1897: Dabchick
- 1898: Sabine Queen
- 1899: Irish Ivy
- 1900: May Race
- 1901: Royal Mantle
- 1902: Marievale
- 1903: Mary Lester
- 1904: Topstone
- 1905: Blakestown
- 1906: Juliet
- 1907: Reina
- 1908: Queen of Peace
- 1909: Fredith
- 1910: Blair Royal
- 1911: Tullynacree
- 1912: Shining Way
- 1913: Athgreany
- 1914: May Edgar
- 1915: Latharna
- 1916: Captive Princess
- 1917: Golden Maid
- 1918: Judea
- 1919: Snow Maiden
- 1920: Place Royale
- 1921: The Kiwi
- 1922: Miss Hazelwood
- 1923: Becka
- 1924: Amethystine
- 1925: Ixia
- 1926: Resplendent
- 1927: Cinq a Sept
- 1928: Haintonette
- 1929: Soloptic
- 1930: Theresina
- 1931: Nitsichin
- 1932: Santaria
- 1933: Salar
- 1934: Foxcroft
- 1935: Smokeless
- 1936: Silversol
- 1937: Sol Speranza
- 1938: Conversation Piece
- 1939: Superbe
- 1940: Queen of Shiraz
- 1941: Uvira
- 1942: Majideh
- 1943: Suntop
- 1944: Avoca
- 1945: Admirable
- 1946: Linaria
- 1947: Desert Drive
- 1948: Masaka
- 1949: Circus Lady
- 1950: Corejada
- 1951: Djebellica
- 1952: Five Spots
- 1953: Noory
- 1954: Pantomime Queen
- 1955: Agar's Plough
- 1956: Garden State
- 1957: Silken Glider
- 1958: Amante
- 1959: Discorea
- 1960: Lynchris
- 1961: Ambergris
- 1962: French Cream
- 1963: Hibernia
- 1964: Ancasta
- 1965: Aurabella
- 1966: Merry Mate
- 1967: Pampalina
- 1968: Celina
- 1969: Gaia

== See also ==
- Horse racing in Ireland
- List of Irish flat horse races
