= Ramruma =

American-bred Thoroughbred racehorse

- Racing colours of Fahd Salman
- Sire: Diesis
- Grandsire: Sharpen Up
- Dam: Princess of Man
- Damsire: Green God
- Sex: Mare
- Foaled: 17 February 1996
- Country: United States
- Colour: Chestnut
- Breeder: Newgate Stud Company
- Owner: Fahd bin Salman
- Trainer: Henry Cecil
- Record: 11: 5-2-3
- Earnings: £530,470

Major wins
- Lingfield Oaks Trial (1999); Epsom Oaks (1999); Irish Oaks (1999); Yorkshire Oaks (1999)

Awards
- European Champion Three-Year-Old Filly (1999); Timeform rating 123
- Last updated on August 25, 2007

Ramruma (foaled 17 February 1996) is a retired Thoroughbred racehorse who was bred in the United States, but trained in the United Kingdom during a racing career which lasted from September 1998 until September 2000. In 1999, Ramruma won five of her six races including three Group One races: The Oaks and the Irish Oaks against other three-year-old fillies and the Yorkshire Oaks in which she also defeated older fillies and mares. Her performances led to Ramruma being named European Champion Two-Year-Old Filly at the Cartier Racing Awards. She was retired after failing to win in three starts as a four-year-old in 2000.

== Background ==
Ramruma, a small, lightly built chestnut filly with a white star, was bred at the Kentucky branch of her owner, Fahd bin Salman's Newgate Stud, sired by Diesis out of the mare Princess of Man. Diesis won the rare double of the Middle Park Stakes and the Dewhurst Stakes in 1982, before becoming an "excellent" sire, producing the winners of at least 25 Group One races including Halling, Diminuendo and Elmaamul. Princess of Man was a successful racemare winning the Musidora Stakes in 1978. In addition to Ramruma she was the dam of the Lingfield Oaks Trial winner Ausherra.

The filly was sent into training with Henry Cecil at the Warren Place stable at Newmarket, Suffolk.

"Ramruma" was the pet name of Fahd bin Salman's youngest daughter Reema.

== Racing career ==
=== 1998: two-year-old season ===
Ramruma's career began with two runs in one mile maiden races in the autumn of 1998. At Sandown in September, she ran third to the odds-on Social Scene, staying on steadily in the last two furlongs and looking as though she would be "better for the race".

Three weeks later Ramruma was made 11/8 favourite for a similar event at Nottingham. She disappointed her backers, however, appearing to lack pace at a crucial stage and never getting on terms with the outsider Magda, who led from the start and won by three lengths.

=== 1999: three-year-old season ===
==== Spring ====
On her three-year-old debut, Ramruma was matched against colts in a one and a half mile maiden race at the Craven meeting at Newmarket. Ramruma showed the first signs of her true ability, taking the lead two furlongs out and pulling well clear to win by three and a half lengths from the future Singapore Derby winner All The Way, despite being eased down in the closing stages. In May she was moved up to Listed class for the Lingfield Oaks Trial for which she was made odds-on favourite. Kieren Fallon sent the filly into the lead three furlongs out, and she ran on strongly to go clear in the final furlong and win by one and a half lengths. The Racing Post called the performance "unspectacular" but the bookmakers responded by cutting her odds for the Oaks to 3/1.

==== Summer ====
Following her trial win, Ramruma was sent to Epsom for the Oaks, in which she started the 3/1 second favourite behind the Godolphin filly Zahrat Dubai, winner of the Musidora Stakes. Fallon settled the filly just behind the leaders before moving her up to take the lead two furlongs out. Ramruma accelerated clear of her the field and was never in danger of defeat, staying on strongly to win by three lengths from the outsider Noushkey, with Zahrat Dubai a further five lengths back in third.

The ground for the Irish Oaks at The Curragh a month later was significantly firmer, but the opposition was not particularly strong and Ramruma was made 4/9 favourite. Fallon sent Ramruma into the lead entering the straight and she soon went well clear of the field. She was eased down towards the finish but still crossed the line seven lengths in front. Fallon described her as being "stronger and better" than before while Cecil described her as "a very good filly" who was "improving all the time". Both the St Leger and the Prix de l'Arc de Triomphe were suggested as possible targets, with the bookmakers offering her at 4/1 and 16/1 for the races respectively.

After Fallon was sacked from his job as Cecil's stable jockey, the veteran Pat Eddery took over the ride on Ramruma for the Yorkshire Oaks at York in August. The early pace was slow and Eddery sent Ramruma to the front after three furlongs. She led the field into the straight where was strongly challenged but ran on "very gamely" to win by one and a quarter lengths from the Lancashire Oaks winner Ela Athena with the Princess Royal Stakes winner Silver Rhapsody in third.

==== Autumn ====
Ramruma's stamina was an obvious strength, with all her wins coming over one and a half miles, and it was decided to test her against the colts in the St Leger over a mile and three-quarters at Doncaster in September. The male opposition did not appear to be particularly strong, and Ramruma was made odds-on favourite ahead of the King Edward VII Stakes winner Mutafaweq. Ramruma raced prominently and took the lead three furlongs out to the delight of the crowd but she was soon challenged and headed by Mutafaweq. The filly rallied "valiantly" on the run to the line but was unable to get back on terms with the colt and finished second, beaten two lengths.

=== 2000: four-year-old season ===
Ramruma was made favourite for her four-year-old debut in the Jockey Club Stakes at Newmarket in May. After racing prominently she weakened badly in the closing stages and finished lame. She returned from the race with a muscle injury which kept her off the racecourse for more than three months.

In August Ramruma returned to attempt a second win in the Yorkshire Oaks. She was opposed by her stable companion, the 2000 Oaks winner Love Divine as well as the Irish Oaks winner Petrushka.The meeting of the three outstanding fillies was highly anticipated as one of the "races of the season". Ramruma attempted to lead all the way but was overtaken by the two three-year-olds in the straight and finished third, beaten three and a quarter lengths. Cecil was satisfied with her performance and Fahd Salman's racing manager, Anthony Penfold suggested the Breeders' Cup as an end of season target.

On her final start, Ramruma was dropped down to Listed class for the Harvest Stakes at Ascot in September 2000. She was made odds-on favourite, but failed to recapture her old form, finishing four and a half lengths third behind Riyafa. Her retirement was announced later that month. Fahd Salman said of Ramruma, "She's done me very proud and will always be my favourite filly."

== Assessment ==
At the 1999 Cartier Racing Awards Ramruma was named European Champion Three-Year-Old Filly. In the International Classification for 1999 she was given a rating of 119, five pounds below the American filly Silverbulletday.

The independent Timeform organisation gave Ramruma a rating of 123.

== Stud career ==
Fahd Salman died in July 2001, and in December 2003 Ramruma was sent to the December Tattersalls sales as part of the final dispersal of her late owner's horses. Where she was bought for 2,100,000, a European record for a broodmare, by John Magnier for the Coolmore Stud.

Ramruma was bred to leading stallions including Rainbow Quest and Machiavellian. Her best foal has been Flying Cross (by Sadler's Wells), who won two races and finished third in the Irish St. Leger.

- 2003 Weather Report (GB) : Bay filly, foaled 1 March, by Rainbow Quest (USA) – unraced, dam of winner Wavelet (GB) (2012, by Archipenko <USA>)
- 2004 Catherine Linton (IRE) : Bay filly, foaled 28 February, by Machiavellian (USA) – unplaced in four races in Ireland 2006
- 2005 Fine Design (IRE) : Bay filly, foaled 1 January, by Sadler's Wells (USA) – placed twice from four starts in Ireland 2007/8
- 2006 Emonoja (IRE) : Bay filly, foaled 10 April, by Sadler's Wells (USA) – unraced and died in 2017
- 2007 Flying Cross (IRE) : Bay colt, foaled 7 May, by Sadler's Wells (USA) – won 2 races in Ireland and 3rd G1 Irish St. Leger, Curragh 2009/10
- 2008 Gunboat (IRE) : Bay colt (gelded), foaled 5 May, by Danehill Dancer (IRE) – placed once from 5 races in England 2012/13 – winner in Belgium
- 2013 Chestnut filly by Galileo (IRE)
- 2014 Touch of Paradise (IRE): Chestnut filly, foaled 5 March, by Frankel (GB)
- 2015 Divine Act, chestnut filly by Frankel (GB)
- 2016 Imperium, chestnut colt (gelded) by Frankel (GB)

== Pedigree ==
Pedigree of Ramruma (USA), chestnut mare, 1996
Sire Diesis (GB) 1980	Sharpen Up; 1969	Atan	Native Dancer
Sire Diesis (GB) 1980	Sharpen Up; 1969	Atan	Mixed Marriage
Sire Diesis (GB) 1980	Sharpen Up; 1969	Rocchetta	Rockfella
Sire Diesis (GB) 1980	Sharpen Up; 1969	Rocchetta	Chambiges
Sire Diesis (GB) 1980	Doubly Sure; 1971	Reliance	Tantieme
Sire Diesis (GB) 1980	Doubly Sure; 1971	Reliance	Relance
Sire Diesis (GB) 1980	Doubly Sure; 1971	Soft Angels	Crepello
Sire Diesis (GB) 1980	Doubly Sure; 1971	Soft Angels	Sweet Angel
Dam Princess of Man (IRE) 1975	Green God; 1968	Red God	Nasrullah
Dam Princess of Man (IRE) 1975	Green God; 1968	Red God	Spring Run
Dam Princess of Man (IRE) 1975	Green God; 1968	Thetis	Guersant
Dam Princess of Man (IRE) 1975	Green God; 1968	Thetis	Three Rock
Dam Princess of Man (IRE) 1975	White Legs; 1957	Preciptic	Precipitation
Dam Princess of Man (IRE) 1975	White Legs; 1957	Preciptic	Artistic
Dam Princess of Man (IRE) 1975	White Legs; 1957	Caspian Sea	Tehran
Dam Princess of Man (IRE) 1975	White Legs; 1957	Caspian Sea	Sea Fret (Family: 2-i)
