= User Friendly (horse) =

British-bred Thoroughbred racehorse

- Racing silks of William J. Gredley
- Sire: Slip Anchor
- Grandsire: Shirley Heights
- Dam: Rostova
- Damsire: Blakeney
- Sex: Filly
- Foaled: 1989
- Country: Great Britain
- Colour: Bay
- Breeder: Stetchworth Park Stud Ltd.
- Owner: William J. Gredley
- Trainer: Clive Brittain
- Record: 15: 8-1-1
- Earnings: £961,366

Major wins
- Lingfield Oaks Trial (1992); Epsom Oaks (1992); Irish Oaks (1992); Yorkshire Oaks (1992); St. Leger Stakes (1992); Grand Prix de Saint-Cloud (1993)

Awards
- European Champion Three-Year-Old Filly (1992); European Horse of the Year (1992)

User Friendly (foaled 4 February 1989 in England) is a European Champion Thoroughbred racehorse.

== Background ==
Bred by Stetchworth Park Stud Ltd. in Stetchworth, East Cambridgeshire, she was out of the mare Rostova and a descendant of the great Nearco through her sire, the 1985 Epsom Derby winner, Slip Anchor.

== Racing career ==
=== 1992: three-year-old season ===
Trained by Clive Brittain, User Friendly made her racing debut on 24 April 1992 in England with a win in the Forte Airport Service Fillies Maiden Stakes at Sandown Park Racecourse. She followed up with a win in the Lingfield Oaks Trial then on 6 June won the Group One Classic, The Oaks. On 11 July User Friendly won her second straight Group One event, taking the Irish Oaks at the Curragh. On 19 August she won the Yorkshire Oaks at York Racecourse and then on 12 September at Doncaster Racecourse she made it four Group Ones in a row and her second English Classic win by defeating her male counterparts in the St. Leger Stakes. On 4 October User Friendly was sent to Longchamp Racecourse in Paris for the prestigious Prix de l'Arc de Triomphe where she finished second to Subotica. In her last start of 1992, User Friendly was sent to Tokyo, Japan to compete in the Japan Cup in which she finished sixth to winner, Tokai Teio.

User Friendly's 1992 performances earned her two Cartier Racing Awards for, one for European Champion Three-Year-Old Filly and the other as the European Horse of the Year.

=== 1993: four-year-old season ===
User Friendly made her first start at age four on 3 June 1993 at Epsom Downs, finishing fourth in the Coronation Cup. She returned to her winning form on 4 July with a victory in the Grand Prix de Saint-Cloud at Saint-Cloud Racecourse in France. On 24 July she ran fourth behind winner Opera House in the King George VI & Queen Elizabeth Diamond Stakes at Ascot Racecourse and then was third as the returning champion in the Yorkshire Oaks. On 3 October User Friendly returned to Longchamp Racecourse in Paris for the 1993 Prix de l'Arc de Triomphe. This time, she finished twenty-second in a field of twenty-three behind winner, Urban Sea.

=== 1994: five-year-old season ===
In 1994, User Friendly's handlers decided to send her to compete in the United States. For trainer Rodney Rash, on 29 July she made her first start of the year winning a 1 1/16-mile Allowance race on grass at Del Mar Racetrack in California. Her next race, and the last of her career, came on 29 August at Arlington Park in Chicago. In a field of eight fillies and mares, she ran last in the Grade 1 Beverly D. Stakes behind fellow European filly Hatoof.

== Breeding record ==
Retired to broodmare duty, at the November 1995 Keeneland breeding stock sale, Kazuo Nakamura of Japan paid US$2.5 million for User Friendly who was already in foal to Mr. Prospector. She was based in Kentucky where she produced three more foals before being sold again at Keeneland's November 1999 breeding stock sale for US$1.7 million to David Nagel who brought her to stand at his Barronstown Stud in County Wexford, Ireland.

User Friendly produced eleven foals between 1996 and 2007 from the world's top sires such as Mr. Prospector, Danehill, Deputy Minister, Kingmambo, Sadler's Wells, Storm Cat, and Danehill Dancer. To date, her offspring have met with limited success in racing.

- 1996 User History (USA), b.f by Mr Prospector (USA) won 3 races in Japan and dam of 3 winners there
- 1997 Lady Venus (USA), b.f. by Kingmambo (USA) placed once from 5 races in Japan and dam of 5 winners there
- 1998 Foal by Storm Cat (USA), unraced
- 1999 Dynamite Kids (USA), b/br.c. by Deputy Minister (CAN) won 2 races in Japan
- 2000 Dream Merchant (IRE), b.g. by Deputy Minister (CAN) won 1 race
- 2001 Two Mile West (IRE), b.g. by Sadler's Wells (USA) won 8 races on the flat, over hurdles and fences, 2nd G3 Queen's Vase at Royal Ascot
- 2002 Streets of Gold (IRE), b.g. by Sadler's Wells (USA) won 6 races on the flat, over hurdles and fences
- 2003 Starspangled (IRE), b.f. by Danehill (USA) won 1 race
- 2004 Downtown (IRE), b.f. by Danehill (USA) won 2 races including G3 Give Thanks Stakes at Cork
- 2005 Sweet Sixteen (IRE), b.f. by Sadler's Wells (USA) unplaced in six races

== Pedigree ==
Pedigree of User Friendly
Sire Slip Anchor	Shirley Heights	Mill Reef	Never Bend
Sire Slip Anchor	Shirley Heights	Mill Reef	Milan Mill
Sire Slip Anchor	Shirley Heights	Hardiemma	Hardicanute
Sire Slip Anchor	Shirley Heights	Hardiemma	Grand Cross
Sire Slip Anchor	Sayonara	Birkhahn	Alchimist
Sire Slip Anchor	Sayonara	Birkhahn	Bramouse
Sire Slip Anchor	Sayonara	Suleika	Ticino
Sire Slip Anchor	Sayonara	Suleika	Schwarzblaurot
Dam Rostova	Blakeney	Hethersett	Hugh Lupus
Dam Rostova	Blakeney	Hethersett	Bride Elect
Dam Rostova	Blakeney	Windmill Girl	Hornbeam
Dam Rostova	Blakeney	Windmill Girl	Chorus Beauty
Dam Rostova	Poppy Day	Soleil II	Major Portion
Dam Rostova	Poppy Day	Soleil II	Aurore Polaire
Dam Rostova	Poppy Day	Red Poppy	Rockefella
Dam Rostova	Poppy Day	Red Poppy	Red Shoes
