= Shoot A Line =

British-bred Thoroughbred racehorse

- Sire: High Line
- Grandsire: High Hat
- Dam: Death Ray
- Damsire: Tamerlane
- Sex: Mare
- Foaled: 2 April 1977
- Country: United Kingdom
- Colour: Bay
- Breeder: Arthur Budgett
- Owner: Arthur Budgett; Peter M. Brant
- Trainer: Dick Hern; LeRoy Jolley
- Record: 17: 7-2-0

Major wins
- Cheshire Oaks (1980); Ribblesdale Stakes (1980); Irish Oaks (1980); Yorkshire Oaks (1980); Park Hill Stakes (1980)

Awards
- Timeform rating 127 (1980); Top-rated British three-year-old filly (1980)

Shoot A Line (foaled 2 April 1977) was a British Thoroughbred racehorse and broodmare. After winning her only race as a two-year-old she developed into one of the best fillies in Europe in 1980, winning the Cheshire Oaks, Ribblesdale Stakes, Irish Oaks, Yorkshire Oaks and Park Hill Stakes. In the following year she failed to win but ran creditably when finishing second to Ardross in the Ascot Gold Cup. As a five-year-old she was campaigned in the United States with little success before being retired to stud. She is the grand-dam of the Kentucky Derby winner Thunder Gulch.

== Background ==
Shoot A Line was a "lengthy, lightly-made" bay filly with a white star and white socks on her hind legs bred by her owner Arthur Budgett. She was not a particularly attractive filly, being described by Timeform as resembling "a bag of bones", during the summer of her three-year-old season. Her dam, Death Ray, was a half-sister to the July Cup winner Daylight Robbery and produced several other winners including More Light, a colt who won the Gordon Stakes and the Jockey Club Stakes. Shoot A Line's sire High Line was a specialist stayer who won three runnings of the Jockey Club Cup before becoming a very successful breeding stallion whose other progeny included Master Willie.

The filly was sent into training with Dick Hern at West Ilsley. She was part of a very strong generation of fillies at West Ilsley, which also included Bireme and the partially sighted The Dancer (May Hill Stakes).

== Racing career ==
=== 1979: two-year-old season ===
Shoot A Line made her racecourse debut in the Radley Stakes at Newbury Racecourse in October. She showed "immense promise" in winning the race by five lengths from her stable companion Dancing Shadow.

=== 1980: three-year-old season ===
Shoot A Line began her second season in the Group Three Cheshire Oaks in May. She looked less than fully fit and appeared to be unsuited by the tight track, but won by five lengths from the Irish filly Little Bonny. On 7 June Shoot A Line contested the 202nd running of the Oaks Stakes at Epsom Downs Racecourse, in which she was ridden by Tony Murray, as the stable jockey, Willie Carson, had elected to ride Bireme. The filly misbehaved before the start and ran very poorly in the race, finishing unplaced behind Bireme, Vielle and The Dancer. Less than two weeks later, the filly started 5/2 joint-favourite for the Group Two Ribbledale Stakes at Royal Ascot. Ridden by Willie Carson, she led for most of the race and drew away from her opponents in the straight to win by five length from North Forland.

Bireme was injured in June, and Shoot A Line took her stable companion's place in the Irish Oaks at the Curragh Racecourse in July. Carson sent the filly into the lead from the start and she turned back the challenges of the Irish fillies Little Bonny and Racquette in the straight to win by two and a half lengths. On 19 August she was sent to York Racecourse for the Group One Yorkshire Oaks in which she was matched against Vielle, who, since finishing second in the Oaks, had won the Lancashire Oaks and the Nassau Stakes. Ridden by Lester Piggott, she started at 13/8, while the much more impressive-looking Vielle was made the odds-on favourite. Shoot A Line led from the start as usual before increasing the pace in the straight. Vielle emerged with a strong challenge two furlongs from the finish, but Shoot A Line held off the challenge of the favourite to win by one and a half lengths. On her final appearance of the year, the filly returned to Yorkshire for the Park Hill Stakes over fourteen and a half furlongs at Doncaster Racecourse on 11 September. Ridden by Carson, she started at odds of 1/2 and was never in any danger of defeat, leading from the start and winning very easily by eight lengths from Broomstick Corner.

=== 1981: four-year-old season ===
In 1981 in Europe, there were few opportunities for older female horses to compete against their own sex in major races, with the Princess Royal Stakes being the only British Group race for fillies open to female horses over the age of three. Shoot A Line was therefore required to race against male opposition when she returned as a four-year-old in 1981. She made a very disappointing seasonal debut in the John Porter Stakes at Newbury Racecourse in April, injuring herself in the starting stalls and being pulled-up in a race won by Pelerin.

At Royal Ascot in June, Shoot A Line was one of three horses to oppose the outstanding stayer Ardross in the Ascot Gold Cup over two and a half miles. She was the only one of Ardross's opponents to be given any chance against him, starting the 7/2 second favourite. Ridden by Carson, she made a determined challenge in the straight but was never able to get on terms with the favourite and finished second, beaten a length. The filly was then sent to Germany for the Grosser Preis von Berlin, but ran very poorly, finishing seventh of the eight runners behind French-trained Lydian. At Ayr Racecourse on 16 September, she ran in the Listed Doonside Cup over eleven furlongs. She led for most of the race but was outpaced in the closing stages and was beaten a length by the colt Castle Keep.

=== 1982: five-year-old season ===
In 1982, Shoot A Line was bought by Peter Brant and sent to race in the United States where she was trained by LeRoy Jolley. On her American debut she won an allowance race at Gulfstream Park in April, but she finished no better than fourth in her remaining five races.

== Assessment ==
In 1980, Shoot A Line was given a rating of 127 by the independent Timeform organisation, equal with Bireme and Mrs Penny and four pounds below the top-rated three-year-old filly Detroit. In the official International Classification she was rated equal with Mrs Penny as the best British-trained three-year-old filly, two pounds below the French-trained Detroit. She was rated 117 by Timeform in 1981.

== Stud record ==
Shoot A line was retired to stud to become a broodmare for her owner's stud. She produced at least nine foals, all of them fillies, between 1984 and 2000. Few of them made any impact as racehorses, but her 1987 foal Line of Thunder became a very successful broodmare, producing several winners including the Kentucky Derby winner Thunder Gulch.

Shoot A Line's foals:

- Head of Victory (bay filly, foaled in 1984, sired by Mr. Prospector) – placed twice from 7 starts in Britain 1986–87
- Pamusi (bay filly, 1985, by Mr. Prospector), failed to win in two races
- Shooting Line (bay filly, 1986, by Roberto), won one race
- Line of Thunder (bay filly, 1987, by Storm Bird), won three races, dam of Thunder Gulch.
- Somnifere (chestnut filly, 1990, by Nijinsky), failed to win in four races
- The Skeat (bay filly, 1991, by Nureyev), failed to win in three race
- Chantereine (chestnut filly, 1994, by Trempolino), failed to win in four races
- An Mosey (bay filly, 1999, by Royal Academy), unraced
- Eadaoin (filly, 2000, by King of Kings), unraced

== Pedigree ==
Pedigree of Shoot A Line (GB), bay mare, 1977
Sire High Line (GB) 1966	High Hat (GB); 1957	Hyperion	Gainsborough
Sire High Line (GB) 1966	High Hat (GB); 1957	Hyperion	Selene
Sire High Line (GB) 1966	High Hat (GB); 1957	Madonna	Donatello
Sire High Line (GB) 1966	High Hat (GB); 1957	Madonna	Women's Legion
Sire High Line (GB) 1966	Time Call (GB); 1955	Chanteur	Chateau Bouscaut
Sire High Line (GB) 1966	Time Call (GB); 1955	Chanteur	La Diva
Sire High Line (GB) 1966	Time Call (GB); 1955	Aleria	Djebel
Sire High Line (GB) 1966	Time Call (GB); 1955	Aleria	Canidia
Dam Death Ray (GB) 1959	Tamerlane (GB); 1952	Persian Gulf	Bahram
Dam Death Ray (GB) 1959	Tamerlane (GB); 1952	Persian Gulf	Double Life
Dam Death Ray (GB) 1959	Tamerlane (GB); 1952	Eastern Empress	Nearco
Dam Death Ray (GB) 1959	Tamerlane (GB); 1952	Eastern Empress	Cheveley Lady
Dam Death Ray (GB) 1959	Luminant (GB); 1951	Nimbus	Nearco
Dam Death Ray (GB) 1959	Luminant (GB); 1951	Nimbus	Kong
Dam Death Ray (GB) 1959	Luminant (GB); 1951	Bardia	Colombo
Dam Death Ray (GB) 1959	Luminant (GB); 1951	Bardia	Felsetta (Family: 11-d)

- Shoot A Line was inbred 4 x 4 to Nearco, meaning that this stallion appears twice in the fourth generation of her pedigree.
