= La Roche (horse) =

British-bred Thoroughbred racehorse

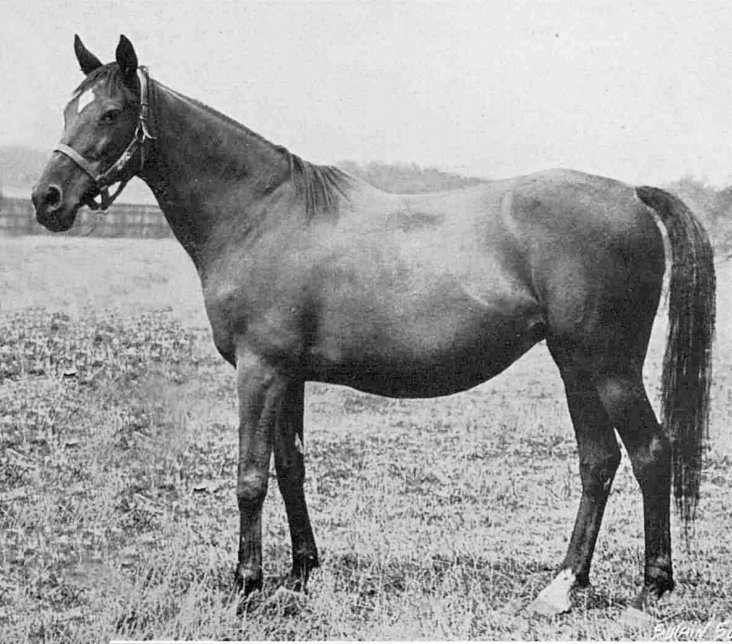
- La Roche in 1913.
- Sire: St Simon
- Grandsire: Galopin
- Dam: Miss Mildred
- Damsire: Melton
- Sex: Mare
- Foaled: 1897
- Country: United Kingdom
- Colour: Bay
- Breeder: William Cavendish-Bentinck, 6th Duke of Portland
- Owner: 6th Duke of Portland
- Trainer: John Porter
- Record: 13: 5-1-2
- Earnings: £8,000 (1900)

Major wins
- Prince of Wales's Nursery (1899); Oaks Stakes (1900); Manchester Cup (1900); Yorkshire Oaks (1900); Newmarket Oaks (1900)

La Roche (1897 – 1920) was a British Thoroughbred racehorse and broodmare. As a two-year-old in 1899 she showed some promise, winning once from six attempts, but appeared to be some way below top class. In the following season, when tried over longer distance, she emerged as one of the best horses of her generation in England, winning the Oaks Stakes, Manchester Cup, Yorkshire Oaks and Newmarket Oaks as well as finishing fourth in the 1000 Guineas and third in the Doncaster Cup. She was retired at the end of the season to become a broodmare and had considerable success as a dam of winners.

== Background ==
La Roche was a small bay mare with no black leg points bred in England by her owner the 6th Duke of Portland. She was trained throughout her racing career by John Porter at his Kingsclere stable in Berkshire. As a three-year-old was described as "very sharp-looking, but not quite big enough for the best company.

She was one of the last notable horses sired by St. Simon, an undefeated racehorse who was considered one of the best British runners of the 19th Century. In an outstanding stud career he won nine sires’ championships, having sired ten Classic winners. Her dam, Miss Mildred showed no ability as a racehorse but was a granddaughter of the influential British broodmare Braxey.

== Racing career ==
=== 1899: two-year-old season ===
On the day of the 1899 Epsom Oaks La Roche ran promisingly in the Acorn Stakes, finishing second to Dum Dum in a thirteen-runner field. La Roche was matched against male opponent in the British Dominion Two-Year-Old Race over five furlongs at Sandown Park on 24 June but after showing good early speed she came home last of the five runners behind Stealaway. She recorded her only victory of the year in September when she won the Prince of Wales's Nursery at Doncaster September. On her final run of the season she ran third in the Osmaston Nursery Plate at Derby Racecourse in November, conceding weight to the first finishers.

=== 1900: three-year-old season ===
On 4 May La Roche began her second campaign in the 1000 Guineas at Newmarket Racecourse, starting at odds of 10/7 against ten opponents. Ridden by Mornington Cannon, she ran "very well" to take fourth place behind Winifreda, Inquisitive and Vain Duchess.

At Epsom Racecourse on 1 June La Roche, with Cannon again in the saddle, started the 5/1 third choice in the betting behind Winifreda and Lady Schomberg in a fourteen-runner field for the 122nd running of the Oaks Stakes. The weather was cold and windy and the crowd was unusually small although it included the Prince of Wales. Commenting on his trainee's chances before the race John Porter had said "she will run well, for she is a rare little sticker". La Roche was settled in mid-division before making steady progress into third place behind Lady Schomberg and Paigle entering the straight. She took the lead a quarter of a mile from the finish and drew away to win very easily by three lengths from Merry Gal, with Lady Schomberg coming home a distant third. The Oaks form received a boost on 5 July when Merry Gal scored an upset victory over Diamond Jubilee in the Princess of Wales's Stakes at Newmarket.

One week after her Oaks triumph, La Roche followed up by "cantering" to victory under 107 pounds in the valuable Manchester Cup, a handicap race over one and three quarter miles at Manchester Racecourse. La Roche won again at York Racecourse on 28 August, when she "slaughtered" the opposition to take the Yorkshire Oaks from Inquisitive and Vain Duchess at odds of 1/4.

La Roche had never been entered in the St Leger, for which she might well have started favourite, and so was instead matched against older horses in the two and a quarter mile Doncaster Cup on 14 September at the same meeting. Despite carrying a ten pound weight penalty she started 5/6 favourite but after leading into the straight she was overtaken and beaten into third place behind King's Courier and Merry Gal. On her penultimate start of the year she started 1/10 favourite for the two-mile Newmarket Oaks on 9 October and won by eight lengths from her two opponents. For her final run of the season La Roche was assigned top weight of 122 for the Cambridgeshire Handicap over eight and a half furlongs at Newmarket on 24 October. Racing over a much shorter distance than she had attempted since May, she finished unplaced behind the four-year-old colt Berrill.

La Roche earned £8,000 as a three-year-old.

== Assessment and honours ==
In their book, A Century of Champions, based on the Timeform rating system, John Randall and Tony Morris rated La Roche an "average" winner of the Oaks.

== Breeding record ==
After being retired from racing at the end of her second season, La Roche became a broodmare for the Duke of Portland's stud. La Roche was euthanized in 1920. She produced at least eight foals and three winners between 1902 and 1920:

- Ormsby, a colt, foaled in 1902, sired by Orme
- Caroline Roche, chestnut filly, 1904, by Carbine
- Roche Abbey, brown filly, 1905, by Cyllene
- Grotte de Han, bay filly, 1907, by Isinglass. Female-line ancestor of Djefou, sire of Puissant Chef (Prix de l'Arc de Triomphe) and Rapace (French Derby).
- Almissa, bay colt, 1908, by Ayrshire. Won Australian Cup.
- Cannobie, brown colt, 1913, by Polymelus. Won Jockey Club Stakes.
- Sir Berkeley, bay colt, 1915, by Sunstar. Won six races.
- Kinnaird, bay colt, 1920, by Corcyra

== Pedigree ==
Pedigree of La Roche (GB), bay mare, 1897
Sire St Simon (GB) 1881	Galopin; 1872	Vedette	Voltigeur
Sire St Simon (GB) 1881	Galopin; 1872	Vedette	Mrs Ridgway
Sire St Simon (GB) 1881	Galopin; 1872	Flying Duchess	The Flying Dutchman
Sire St Simon (GB) 1881	Galopin; 1872	Flying Duchess	Merope
Sire St Simon (GB) 1881	St. Angela; 1865	King Tom	Harkaway
Sire St Simon (GB) 1881	St. Angela; 1865	King Tom	Pocahontas
Sire St Simon (GB) 1881	St. Angela; 1865	Adeline	Ion
Sire St Simon (GB) 1881	St. Angela; 1865	Adeline	Little Fairy
Dam Miss Mildred (GB) 1890	Melton; 1882	Master Kildare	Lord Ronald
Dam Miss Mildred (GB) 1890	Melton; 1882	Master Kildare	Silk
Dam Miss Mildred (GB) 1890	Melton; 1882	Violet Melrose	Scottish Chief
Dam Miss Mildred (GB) 1890	Melton; 1882	Violet Melrose	Violet
Dam Miss Mildred (GB) 1890	Merino; 1874	Young Melbourne	Melbourne
Dam Miss Mildred (GB) 1890	Merino; 1874	Young Melbourne	Clarissa
Dam Miss Mildred (GB) 1890	Merino; 1874	Braxey	Moss Trooper
Dam Miss Mildred (GB) 1890	Merino; 1874	Braxey	Queen Mary (Family: 10-d)
