= Love (horse) =

Irish Thoroughbred racehorse

- Racing silks of Michael Tabor
- Sire: Galileo
- Grandsire: Sadler's Wells
- Dam: Pikaboo
- Damsire: Pivotal
- Sex: Mare
- Foaled: 13 April 2017
- Country: Ireland
- Colour: Chestnut
- Breeder: Coolmore Stud
- Owner: Michael Tabor, Derrick Smith & Susan Magnier
- Trainer: Aidan O'Brien
- Record: 13: 7-1-3
- Earnings: £1,135,703

Major wins
- Silver Flash Stakes (2019); Moyglare Stud Stakes (2019); 1000 Guineas (2020); Epsom Oaks (2020); Yorkshire Oaks (2020); Prince of Wales's Stakes (2021)

Awards
- Cartier Champion Three-year-old Filly (2020)

Love (foaled 13 April 2017) is an Irish Thoroughbred racehorse. She showed top-class form as a juvenile in 2019 when she won three of her seven races including the Silver Flash Stakes and the Moyglare Stud Stakes as well as running third in the Fillies' Mile. On her first appearance as a three-year-old she won the 1000 Guineas, following up with a facile victory in the Oaks Stakes and a similar win in the Yorkshire Oaks.

== Background ==
Love is a chestnut mare with a broad white blaze and a white sock on her right foreleg bred in Ireland by the Coolmore Stud. She is owned by the Coolmore partners Michael Tabor, Susan Magnier and Derrick Smith. Like many Coolmore horses she was sent into training with Aidan O'Brien at Ballydoyle.

She was sired by Galileo, who won the Derby, Irish Derby and King George VI and Queen Elizabeth Stakes in 2001. Galileo became one of the world's leading stallions, earning his tenth champion sire of Great Britain and Ireland title in 2018. His other progeny include Frankel, Nathaniel, New Approach, Rip Van Winkle, Found, Minding and Ruler of the World.

Love's dam Pikaboo showed no racing ability, failing to win or place in five starts, but did better as a broodmare, producing several other winners including Lucky Kristale (Lowther Stakes), Peach Tree (Stanerra Stakes) and Flattering (Munster Oaks). Her grand-dam Gold Runner was a half-sister to Don't Forget Me.

== Racing career ==
=== 2019: two-year-old season ===
Love was ridden her first three races by her trainer's son Donnacha O'Brien. The filly made her debut in a maiden race over seven furlongs at Leopardstown Racecourse on 6 June in which she started the 11/4 favourite but came home fourth of the seven runners, just over three lengths behind the winner Cayenne Pepper. Three weeks later she started favourite for a similar event at the Curragh and disputed the lead from the start before going down by a neck to the Jessica Harrington-trained Windracer. On 11 July Love started 5/6 favourite for a maiden at Leopardstown and recorded her first success as she led from the start and held off a challenge from Soul Search to win by a head. Seamie Heffernan took over the ride when Love was stepped up in class for the Group 3 Silver Flash Stakes at Leopardstown two weeks later. She started at odds of 8/1 in an eight-runner field which also included her stablemates Precious Moments (the 2/1 favourite) and So Wonderful as well as Windracer. Love immediately went to the front and was never seriously challenged, pulling away from her opponents in the last furlong to win "easily" by three and a quarter lengths from Unforgetable [sic]. After the race Aidan O'Brien described the winner as "a lovely filly" who was "coming forward with every run".

In her last three races of 2019 Love was partnered with Ryan Moore. On 23 August at the Curragh she was made the 6/4 favourite for the Group 2 Debutante Stakes but after taking the lead two furlongs out she was overtaken in the closing stages and faded to come home fifth of the nine runners behind Alpine Star, Petite Mustique, Soul Search and So Wonderful. The Group 1 Moyglare Stud Stakes at the Curragh on 15 September attracted a field of nine two-year-old fillies and saw Love go off the 6/1 third choice in the betting behind the British-trained Daahyeh (winner of the Albany Stakes) and Albigna. Soul Search, Precious Moments and So Wonderful were again in opposition as well as Tango (another Aidan O'Brien entry), Under The Stars (Princess Margaret Stakes) and Assurance. Moore settled the filly just behind the leaders as Tango set the pace before giving way to Soul Search two furlongs from the finish. Love overtook Soul Search just inside the final furlong and stayed on well to win by three quarters of a length from Daahyeh. Aidan O'Brien commented "She is a queen. She's genuine, has a beautiful pedigree, and stays very well. She has a beautiful action and when Ryan asked her to get down and lengthen she stuck her head out. She's been working lovely and progressing with every run".

On 11 October Love was sent to England and stepped up in distance for the Fillies' Mile at Newmarket Racecourse and started the 4/1 third favourite in a nine-runner field. She took the lead four furlongs from the finish but was not able to break away from her rivals and was outpaced in the closing stages, finishing third behind Quadrilateral and Powerful Breeze.

=== 2020: three-year-old season ===
The flat racing season in England was disrupted by the COVID-19 pandemic and the 1000 Guineas was run a month later than usual on 7 June over the Rowley mile at Newmarket. Quadrilateral headed the betting with Love (ridden by Moore) starting the 4/1 joint second favourite alongside Millisle while the other twelve runners included Raffle Prize (Queen Mary Stakes), Cloak of Spirits, Boomer (Prestige Stakes), Under The Stars and Summer Romance (Empress Stakes). In rainy conditions the fillies raced on the far side of the wide, straight course with Cloak of Sprits setting the pace and Love settling in mid division to the left of the leaders towards the centre of the track. Love made steady progress approaching the last quarter mile, went to the front a furlong out and drew right away in the closing stages to win by four and a quarter lengths from Cloak of Spirits with Quadrilateral a head away in third place. After the race Moore commented "She's a very uncomplicated filly and we've always thought a lot of her... she was in control of the race from a long way out... At the moment she looks the best three-year-old filly around. I don't know what the plan is but I'd say the Oaks is an option for her".

The 242nd running of the Oaks was run behind closed doors, over one and a half miles at Epsom Racecourse on 4 July and Love, with Moore in the saddle, went off the 11/10 favourite with the best of her seven opponents appearing to be Frankly Darling and Ennistymon who had finished first and second in the Ribblesdale Stakes at Royal Ascot. Love settled towards the rear as the two pacemakers, Tiempo Vuela and Passion set off in front and opened up a huge lead on the rest of the field. Love began to make rapid progress in the straight, picked off the pacemakers approaching the final quarter mile and drew away to win in "impressive" fashion by nine lengths. Her winning time of 2:34.06 was a new record for the race and 0.37 seconds faster than the time recorded by Serpentine when winning the Epsom Derby over the same course and distance an hour later. Aidan O'Brien said "Before the Guineas we thought the mile might be a little bit short, we always felt she’d get a mile and a quarter well and she's very genuine and tries hard, so we were always hoping the extra distance was going to improve her... her last few canters during the week were incredible, really. Obviously you never know what is going to happen, but we felt she was very well" while Moore commented "She was exceptional today. We’ve always thought she's very good and she proved that in the Guineas, but today she's taken a step forward. Almost her best furlong was her last furlong. She's got a great temperament and I don’t think she could have been any more impressive, really... she’ll be a threat to anything".

On 20 August, Love won the Darley Yorkshire Oaks by 5 lengths ridden by jockey Ryan Moore despite some concern by her trainer over rain on the course the previous day. Second was Alpinista. Moore said Love had been exceptional this year – "she's just got stronger and stronger and has done it very easily today".

On 19 November Love was named Champion Three-year-old Filly at the Cartier Racing Awards. In the 2020 World's Best Racehorse Rankings, Love was rated on 122, making her the equal twenty-first best racehorse in the world and the best three-year-old filly alongside Gamine and Swiss Skydiver.

== Pedigree ==
Pedigree of Love (IRE), chestnut filly, 2017
Sire Galileo (IRE) 1998	Sadler's Wells (USA); 1981	Northern Dancer	Nearctic
Sire Galileo (IRE) 1998	Sadler's Wells (USA); 1981	Northern Dancer	Natalma
Sire Galileo (IRE) 1998	Sadler's Wells (USA); 1981	Fairy Bridge	Bold Reason
Sire Galileo (IRE) 1998	Sadler's Wells (USA); 1981	Fairy Bridge	Special
Sire Galileo (IRE) 1998	Urban Sea (USA) ch. 1989	Miswaki	Mr. Prospector
Sire Galileo (IRE) 1998	Urban Sea (USA) ch. 1989	Miswaki	Hopespringseternal
Sire Galileo (IRE) 1998	Urban Sea (USA) ch. 1989	Allegretta	Lombard
Sire Galileo (IRE) 1998	Urban Sea (USA) ch. 1989	Allegretta	Anatevka
Dam Pikaboo (GB) 2003	Pivotal (GB); 1993	Polar Falcon	Nureyev
Dam Pikaboo (GB) 2003	Pivotal (GB); 1993	Polar Falcon	Marie d'Argonne
Dam Pikaboo (GB) 2003	Pivotal (GB); 1993	Fearless Revival	Cozzene
Dam Pikaboo (GB) 2003	Pivotal (GB); 1993	Fearless Revival	Stufida
Dam Pikaboo (GB) 2003	Gleam of Light (IRE); 1991	Danehill (USA)	Danzig
Dam Pikaboo (GB) 2003	Gleam of Light (IRE); 1991	Danehill (USA)	Razyana
Dam Pikaboo (GB) 2003	Gleam of Light (IRE); 1991	Gold Runner	Runnett (GB)
Dam Pikaboo (GB) 2003	Gleam of Light (IRE); 1991	Gold Runner	African Doll (Family 1-k)
