= Minnie Hauk (horse) =

Irish Thoroughbred racehorse

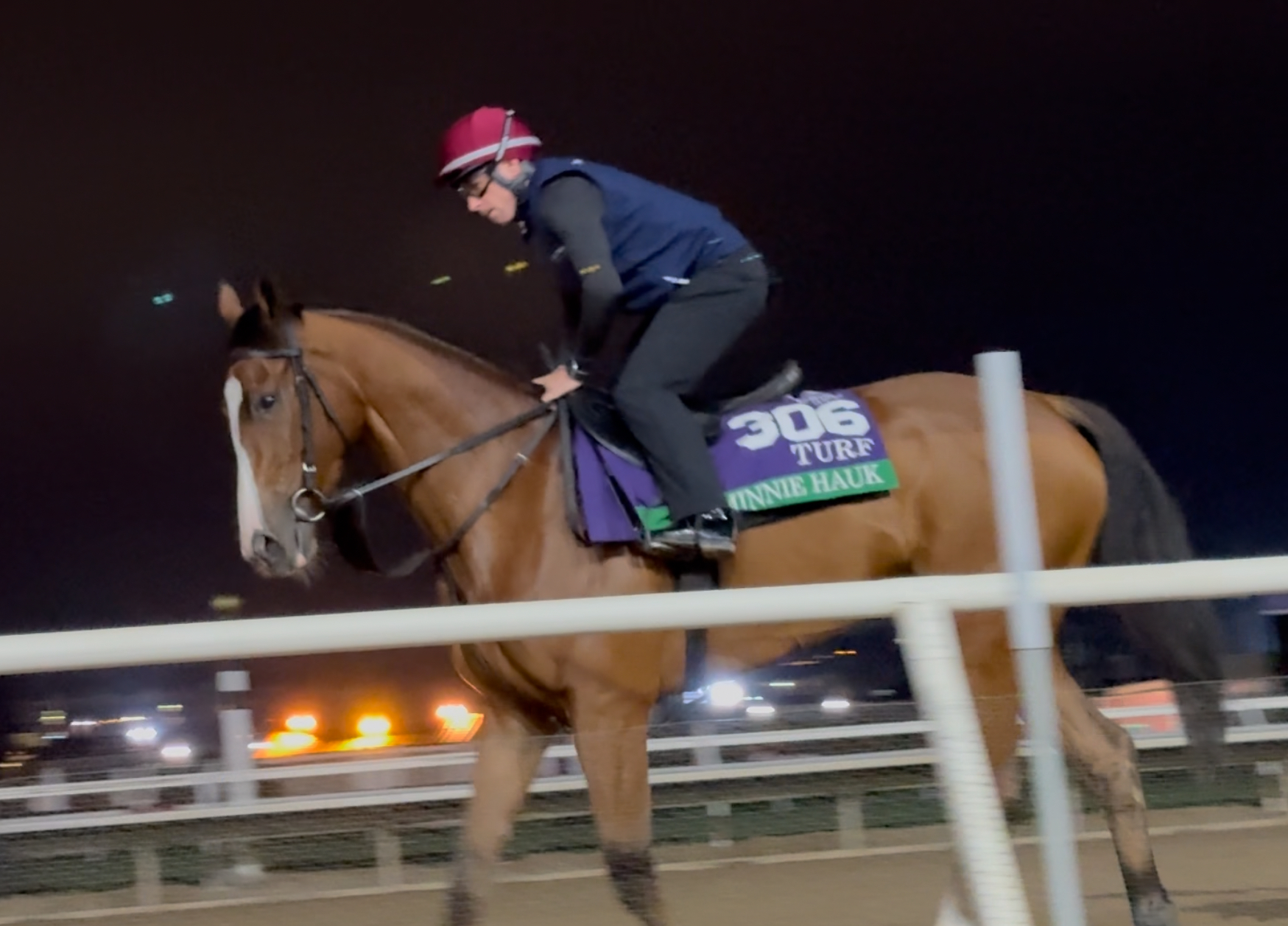
- Sire: Frankel
- Grandsire: Galileo
- Dam: Multilingual
- Damsire: Dansili
- Sex: Filly
- Foaled: 13 April 2022
- Country: Ireland
- Colour: Bay
- Breeder: B V Sangster
- Owner: Derrick Smith, Susan Magnier & Michael Tabor
- Trainer: Aidan O'Brien
- Record: 13: 6-3-1
- Earnings: £ 2,643,673

Major wins
- Cheshire Oaks (2025); Epsom Oaks (2025); Irish Oaks (2025); Yorkshire Oaks (2025); Mooresbridge Stakes (2026); British Champions Fillies and Mares Stakes (2026)

Minnie Hauk (foaled 13 April 2022) is an Irish Thoroughbred racehorse. As a two-year-old in 2024 she finished second on her debut before winning a maiden race at Leopardstown in October. She improved in the following year to take the Cheshire Oaks before winning the Epsom Oaks on her fourth career start.

== Background ==
Minnie Hauk is a bay filly with a white blaze and two white socks bred in Ireland by B V Sangster. As a yearling in September 2023 she was consigned by the Camas Park Stud to the Goffs Orby sale and was bought for €1,850,000 by M V Magnier on behalf of the Coolmore Stud. She was sent into training with Aidan O'Brien at Ballydoyle and races in the ownership of the Coolmore partners Derrick Smith, Susan Magnier and Michael Tabor. She was named after an American opera singer. The name had previously been used for an American mare foaled in 1975 who was the ancestor of several important winners.

She was from the ninth crop of foals sired by Frankel, an undefeated racehorse whose other progeny have included Cracksman, Adayar, Soul Stirring and Hurricane Lane. Minnie Hauk's dam Multilingual finished sixth on her only racecourse appearance but did better as a broodmare, producing the Summer Mile winner Tilsit. As a daughter of the Poule d'Essai des Pouliches winner Zenda Multilingual was a half-sister to Kingman and a close relative of Oasis Dream.

== Racing career ==
=== 2024: two-year-old season ===
Minnie Hauk was ridden in both of her races as a two-year-old by Wayne Lordan. She began her racing career in a one-mile maiden race on yielding ground at Cork Racecourse on 1 October when she started the 13/8 favourite in a fifteen-runner field. She settled behind the leaders and kept on well in the straight but never looked likely to catch the front-running Wemightakedlongway and was beaten two and a half lengths into second place. Eighteen days after her debut, the filly went off the 2/5 favourite against eight opponents for a maiden over one mile on soft ground at Leopardstown Racecourse and recorded her first success as she gained the advantage three furlongs from the finish and held off a challenge from Subsonic to win by half a length.

=== 2025: three-year-old season ===
Minnie Hauk began her second campaign with a trip to England and a step up in class as she contested the Listed Cheshire Oaks over one and a half miles at Chester Racecourse on 7 May when she was partnered by Ryan Moore and started the 13/8 favourite in a seven-runner field. After settling in second place behind Queen of Thieves she took the lead two furlongs from the finish and stayed on in the closing stages to win by a length from Secret of Love. After the race Paul Smith, the son of the owner Derrick Smith, said "I think we'll be heading to Epsom after that, Aidan always thought she'd improve a lot for this run. She's a kind, uncomplicated filly with a great attitude and the step up in trip obviously helped, so we'll be looking at the Oaks I would think."

On 6 June Minnie Hauk was one of nine fillies to contest the 247th running of the Oaks Stakes over one and a half miles at Epsom and went off the 9/2 second choice in the betting behind the 1000 Guineas winner Desert Flower. The best fancied of the other runners were Minnie Hauk's stablemate Giselle (winner of the Lingfield Oaks Trial) and Whirl (Musidora Stakes). Minnie Hauk, with Moore in the saddle, raced in second place behind Whirl before gaining the advantage approaching the last quarter mile. Whirl ralled strongly but Minnie Hauk prevailed by a neck after a "sustained duel" in the final stages. After race O'Brien, who was winning the race for the eleventh time, commented "She's very classy and Ryan gave her a beautiful ride. He loved her last time when she won the Cheshire Oaks and then again today. She's very exciting. She's obviously learning. She went to Chester and learned a lot and was still a bit green. She was always improving from mid-race and is a great traveller... There's every possibility she could run in an Arc.

On 5 October 2025 Minnie Hauk, with Christophe Soumillon in saddle, started as the 9-4 favourite for the Prix de l'Arc de Triomphe, emerging late as the clear favourite ahead of the previous year's runner up Aventure. Minnie Hauk had been supplemented for 4 days prior, paying a €120,000 late entry fee. In the last 2 furlongs she pulled ahead but was driven out by Daryz and caught in the last 50 yards, losing in a "photo finish" by a head.

== Pedigree ==
Pedigree of Minnie Hauk (IRE), bay filly, 2022
Sire Frankel (GB) 2008	Galileo (IRE); 1998	Sadler's Wells (USA)	Northern Dancer (CAN)
Sire Frankel (GB) 2008	Galileo (IRE); 1998	Sadler's Wells (USA)	Fairy Bridge
Sire Frankel (GB) 2008	Galileo (IRE); 1998	Urban Sea (USA)	Miswaki
Sire Frankel (GB) 2008	Galileo (IRE); 1998	Urban Sea (USA)	Allegretta (GB)
Sire Frankel (GB) 2008	Kind (IRE); 2001	Danehill (USA)	Danzig
Sire Frankel (GB) 2008	Kind (IRE); 2001	Danehill (USA)	Razyana
Sire Frankel (GB) 2008	Kind (IRE); 2001	Rainbow Lake (GB)	Rainbow Quest (USA)
Sire Frankel (GB) 2008	Kind (IRE); 2001	Rainbow Lake (GB)	Rockfest (USA)
Dam Multilingual (GB) 2012	Dansili (GB); 1996	Danehill (USA)	Danzig
Dam Multilingual (GB) 2012	Dansili (GB); 1996	Danehill (USA)	Razyana
Dam Multilingual (GB) 2012	Dansili (GB); 1996	Hasili (IRE)	Kahyasi
Dam Multilingual (GB) 2012	Dansili (GB); 1996	Hasili (IRE)	Kerali (GB)
Dam Multilingual (GB) 2012	Zenda (GB); 1999	Zamindar	Gone West
Dam Multilingual (GB) 2012	Zenda (GB); 1999	Zamindar	Zaizafon
Dam Multilingual (GB) 2012	Zenda (GB); 1999	Hope (IRE)	Dancing Brave (USA)
Dam Multilingual (GB) 2012	Zenda (GB); 1999	Hope (IRE)	Bahamian (Family: 19)
