= Mandesha =

French-bred Thoroughbred racehorse

- Sire: Desert Style
- Grandsire: Green Desert
- Dam: Mandalara
- Damsire: Lahib
- Sex: Filly
- Foaled: 2003
- Country: France
- Colour: Bay
- Breeder: HH Aga Khan IV
- Owner: Princess Zahra Aga Khan
- Trainer: Alain de Royer-Dupré
- Record: 12: 6-3-0 (to date)
- Earnings: ongoing

Major wins
- Prix Urban Sea (2006); Prix d'Astarté (2006); Prix Vermeille (2006); Prix de l'Opéra (2006); Prix Corrida (2007)

Awards
- European Champion Three-Year-Old Filly (2006)
- Last updated on October 7, 2007

Mandesha (born 2003) is a French Thoroughbred racehorse. In 2006 she won three Group One races and was named European Champion Three-Year-Old Filly.
