= Yorkshire Oaks =

Flat horse race in Britain

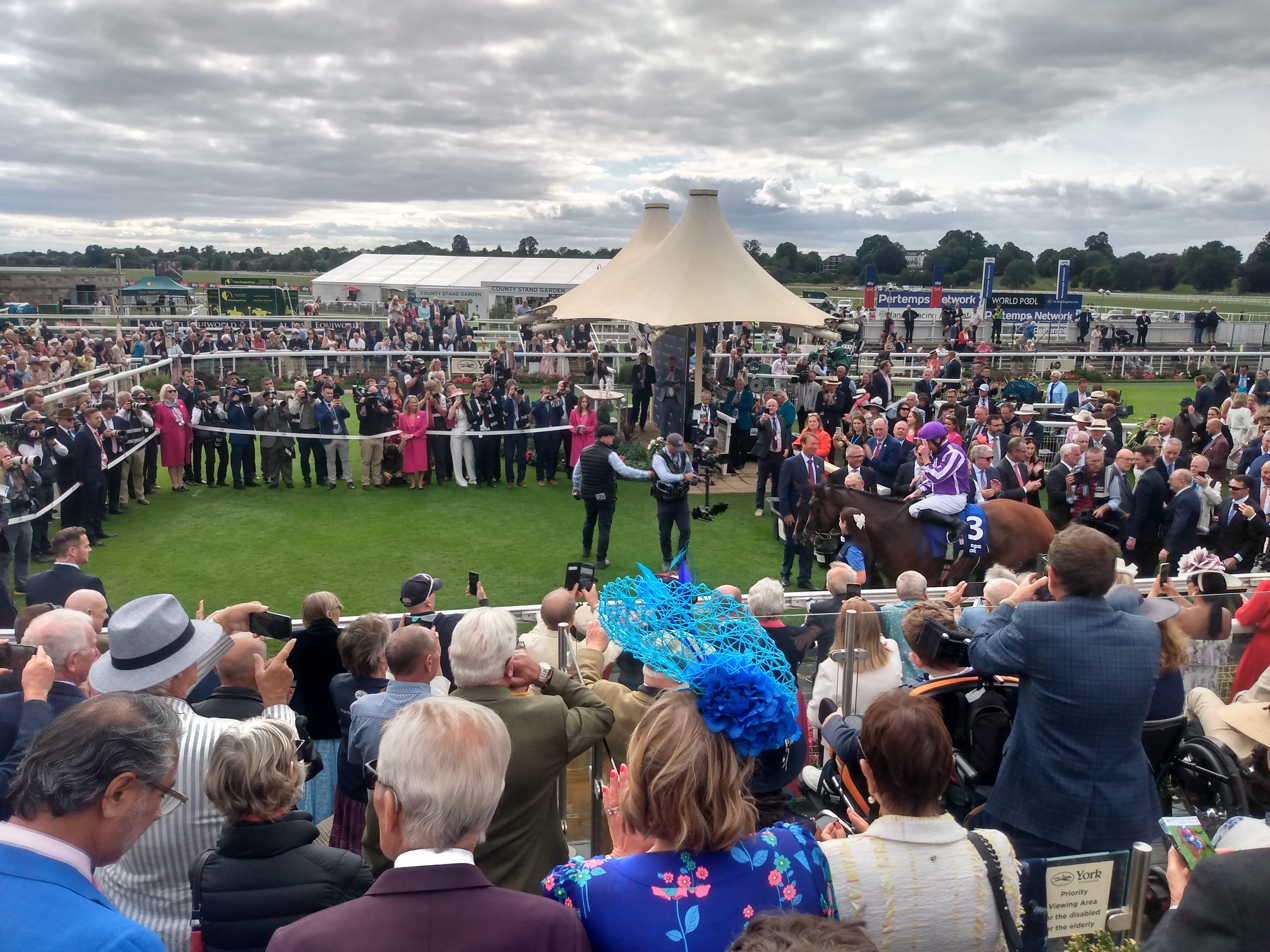
- Minnie Hauk enters the winners' enclosure after winning the 2025 renewal
- Class: Group 1
- Location: York Racecourse; York, England
- Inaugurated: 1849
- Race type: Flat
- Sponsor: Legends Global
- Website: York

Race information
- Distance: 1m 3f 188y (2,385 metres)
- Surface: Turf
- Track: Left-handed
- Qualification: Three-years-old and up fillies & mares
- Weight: 9 st 0 lb (3yo); 9 st 9 lb (4yo+)
- Purse: £600,000 (2026); 1st: £340,260

Yorkshire Oaks
2026
Kalpana	Sparan Nua	Minnie Hauk

Previous years
2025
Minnie Hauk	Estrange	Garden Of Eden
2024
Content	You Got To Me	Emily Upjohn
2023
Warm Heart	Free Wind	Savethelastdance
2022
Alpinista	Tuesday	La Petite Coco
2021
Snowfall	Albaflora	La Joconde

2020-2011
2020
Love	Alpinista	One Voice
2019
Enable	Magical	Lah Ti Dar
2018
Sea of Class	Coronet	Eziyra
2017
Enable	Coronet	Queen's Trust
2016
Seventh Heaven	Found	Queen's Trust
2015
Pleascach	Covert Love	Sea Calisi
2014
Tapestry	Taghrooda	Tasaday
2013
The Fugue	Venus de Milo	Secret Gesture
2012
Shareta	The Fugue	Was
2011
Blue Bunting	Vita Nova	Wonder Of Wonders

2010–2001
2010
Midday	Snow Fairy	Eleanora Duse
2009
Dar Re Mi	Sariska	Roman Empress
2008
Lush Lashes	Dar Re Mi	Michita
2007
Peeping Fawn	Allegretto	Trick Or Treat
2006
Alexandrova	Short Skirt	Allegretto
2005
Punctilious	Dash To The Top	Lune D'or
2004
Quiff	Pongee	Hazarista
2003
Islington	Ocean Silk	Summitville
2002
Islington	Guadalupe	Sulk
2001
Super Tassa	Sacred Song	Rockerlong

2000–1991
2000
Petrushka	Love Divine	Ramruma
1999
Ramruma	Ela Athena	Silver Rhapsody
1998
Catchascatchcan	High And Low	Cloud Castle
1997
My Emma	Whitewater Affair	Crown Of Light
1996
Key Change	Papering	Mezzogiorno
1995
Pure Grain	Magical Retreat	Wind In Her Hair
1994
Only Royale	Dancing Bloom	State Crystal
1993
Only Royale	Dancing Bloom	User Friendly
1992
User Friendly	Bineyah	Guilty Secret
1991
Magnificent Star	Jet Ski Lady	Shamshir

1990–1981
1990
Hellenic	Kartajana	Wajd
1989
Roseate Tern	Alydaress	Petite Ile
1988
Diminuendo	Sudden Love	Sparrow's Air
1987
Bint Pasha	Blessed Event	Bourbon Girl
1986
Untold	Park Express	Ivor's Image
1985
Sally Brown	Kiliniski	Helen Street
1984
Circus Plume	Kanz	Ballinderry
1983
Sun Princess	Green Lucia	Give Thanks
1982
Awaasif	Dish Dash	Cut Loose
1981
Condessa	Leap Lively	Fiesta Fun

1980–1971
1980
Shoot A Line	Vielle	Kahaila
1979
Connaught Bridge	Senorita Poquito	Reprocolor
1978
Fair Salinia	Sorbus	Be Sweet
1977
Busaca	Royal Hive	Dunfermline
1976
Sarah Siddons	African Dancer	Roses for the Star
1975
May Hill	Light Duty	Juliette Marny
1974
Dibidale	Mil's Bomb	Sea Singer
1973
Mysterious	Virunga	Cheveley Princess
1972
Attica Meli	Coral Beach	Ginevra
1971
Fleet Wahine	Outback	Maina

1970–1960
1970
Lupe	Highest Hopes	Christine
1969
Frontier Goddess	Wenduyne	Sleeping Partner
1968
Exchange	Border Bounty	Hardiesse
1967
Palatch	Cranberry Sauce	Arawak
1966
Parthian Glance	Predicament	Brief Chorus
1965
Mabel	Eucumbene	Bracey Bridge
1964
Homeward Bound	Beaufront	Ancasta
1963
Outcrop	Amicable	Kazanlik
1962
West Side Story	Almiranta	Nortia
1961
Tenacity	Irristable	Wistful
1960
Lynchris	No Saint	Green Opal

The Yorkshire Oaks is a Group 1 flat horse race in Great Britain open to fillies and mares aged three years or older. It is run at York over a distance of 1 mile 3 furlongs and 188 yards (2,385 metres), and it is scheduled to take place each year in August.

== History ==
The event was established in 1849, and it was originally restricted to fillies aged three. The inaugural running was won by Ellen Middleton, owned by the 2nd Earl of Zetland.

The present system of race grading was introduced in 1971, and the Yorkshire Oaks was subsequently classed at Group 1 level. It was opened to older fillies and mares in 1991.

The race has been sponsored by Pertemps Network since 2023, and it is currently held on the second day of York's four-day Ebor Festival meeting.

The Yorkshire Oaks often features horses which ran previously in The Oaks. The first to achieve victory in both races was Brown Duchess in 1861, and the most recent was Minnie Hauk in 2025.

== Records ==
Most successful horse (2 wins):

- Only Royale – 1993, 1994
- Islington – 2002, 2003
- Enable - 2017, 2019

Leading jockey (8 wins):

- Fred Archer – Spinaway (1875), Lady Golightly (1877), Jannette (1878), Wheel of Fortune (1879), Dutch Oven (1882), Britomartis (1883), Clochette (1884), Philosophy (1886)

Leading trainer (9 wins):

- Mathew Dawson – Leonie (1868), Gertrude (1870), Spinaway (1875), Lady Golightly (1877), Jannette (1878), Wheel of Fortune (1879), Dutch Oven (1882), Britomartis (1883), Clochette (1884)
- Sir Michael Stoute – Fair Salinia (1978), Sally Brown (1985), Untold (1986), Hellenic (1990), Pure Grain (1995), Petrushka (2000), Islington (2002, 2003), Quiff (2004)
- Aidan O'Brien - Alexandrova (2006), Peeping Fawn (2007), Tapestry (2014), Seventh Heaven (2016), Love (2020), Snowfall (2021), Warm Heart (2023), Content (2024), Minnie Hauk (2025)

Leading owner (9 wins)(includes part ownership):

- Sue Magnier, Michael Tabor – Alexandrova (2006), Peeping Fawn (2007), Tapestry (2014), Seventh Heaven (2016), Love (2020), Snowfall (2021), Warm Heart (2023), Content (2024), Minnie Hauk (2025)

== Winners since 1900 ==
Year	Winner	Age	Jockey	Trainer	Owner	Time
1900	La Roche	3	Mornington Cannon	John Porter	Duke of Portland	2:47.00
1901	Santa Brigida	3	Fred Rickaby	George Lambton		2:35.00
1902	Ice-Maiden	3	Mornington Cannon	John Porter		2:36.00
1903	Hammerkop	3			Major E Loder
1904	Bitters	3	Willie Lane	Herbert Braime
1905	Costly Lady	3	Danny Maher	John Brewer
1906	Catnap	3	George McCall	John Watson
1907	Order Of Merit	3	Barry Lynham	Bill Robinson
1908	Siberia	3	Bernard Dillon	Peter Gilpin
1909	Collet Monte	3	Danny Maher	George Lambton
1910	Winkipop	3	Herbert Jones	William Waugh	Waldorf Astor
1911	Alice	3	Herbert Jones	William Waugh
1912-18	No race
1919	Mademoiselle Foch	3	George Colling	Jack Colling		2:39.40
1920	Inflorescence	3	Elijah Wheatley	Hugh Powney		2:38.40
1921	Love In Idleness	3	Joe Childs	Alec Taylor Jr.	Joseph Watson	2:35.80
1922	Sister-In-Law	3	Herbert Jones	Alec Taylor Jr.		2:41.60
1923	Splendid Jay	3	Frank Bullock	Alec Taylor Jr.		2:41.00
1924	Blue Ice	3	Tommy Weston	George Lambton		2:45.00
1925	Brodick Bay	3	Tommy Weston	George Lambton		2:34.00
1926	Doushka	3	Charlie Smirke	Richard Dawson		2:33.60
1927	Gioconda	3	Sir Gordon Richards	Alec Taylor Jr.		2:44.20
1928	Rye Water	3	Rufus Beasley	Atty Persse		2:38.00
1929	Flittemere	3	Tommy Weston	Frank Butters		2:31.00
1930	Glorious Devon	3	Sir Gordon Richards	Thomas Hogg		2:37.40
1931	Rackety Lassie	3	Johnny Dines	Cecil Boyd-Rochfort		2:41.00
1932 (dh)	Nash Light; Will o' the Wisp	3; 3	Fred Rickaby; Sir Gordon Richards	Thomas Hogg; Fred Darling		2:33.80
1933	Star Of England	3	George Nicoll	Thomas Hogg	Lord Glanely	2:28.60
1934	Dalmary	3	Freddie Fox	Cecil Boyd-Rochfort	Major H Cayzer	2:33.80
1935	Trigo Verde	3	Sir Gordon Richards	Noel Cannon	J V Rank	2:32.00
1936	Silversol	3	Billy Nevett	Matthew Peacock	Matthew Peacock	2:32.60
1937	Sculpture	3	Sir Gordon Richards	Joseph Lawson	Lord Astor	2:34.80
1938	Joyce W	3	Billy Nevett	Joseph Lawson	Sir Victor Sassoon	2:36.80
1939	Night Shift	3	Albert Richardson	Walter Earl	Lord Derby	2:35.80
1940-45	No race
1946	Live Letters	3	Tommy Weston	Noel Cannon	Jimmy Rank	2:36.00
1947	Ladycross	3	Harry Carr	Cecil Boyd-Rochfort	Sir R Sykes	2:32.60
1948	Angelola	3	Edgar Britt	Cecil Boyd-Rochfort	George VI	2:32.00
1949	Unknown Quantity	3	Bill Rickaby	Jack Jarvis	H D H Wills	2:30.80
1950	Above Board	3	Eph Smith	Cecil Boyd-Rochfort	George VI	2:35.80
1951	Sea Parrott	3	Gordon Richards	Noel Murless	Giles Loder	2:33.60
1952	Frieze	3	Edgar Britt	Charles Elsey	Alexander Keith	2:34.80
1953	Kerkeb	3	Gordon Richards	Marcus Marsh	Aga Khan III	2:32.60
1954	Feevagh	3	Ken Gethin	Willie Stephenson	J McGrath	2:45.40
1955	Ark Royal	3	Manny Mercer	George Colling	Dick Hollingsworth	2:32.20
1956	Indian Twilight	3	Joe Mercer	Jack Colling	Jakie Astor	2:43.60
1957	Almeria	3	Harry Carr	Cecil Boyd-Rochfort	Elizabeth II	2:39.20
1958	None Nicer	3	Stan Clayton	Dick Hern	Lionel B. Holliday	2:40.40
1959	Petite Etoile	3	Lester Piggott	Noel Murless	Aly Khan	2:44.80
1960	Lynchris	3	Bill Williamson	John Oxx Sr.	Mrs E Fawcett	2:42.00
1961	Tenacity	3	Scobie Breasley	Gordon Richards	Mrs W Riley-Smith	2:38.40
1962	West Side Story	3	Eph Smith	Ted Leader	Jim Joel	2:42.20
1963	Outcrop	3	Eph Smith	Geoffrey Barling	J Priestman	2:43.40
1964	Homeward Bound	3	Greville Starkey	John Oxley	Foster Robinson	2:36.40
1965	Mabel	3	Joe Mercer	Peter Walwyn	G Williams	2:39.80
1966	Parthian Glance	3	Lester Piggott	George Todd	Mrs W R Smith	2:44.60
1967	Palatch	3	Brian Taylor	Harvey Leader	Carlo Vittadini	2:44.80
1968	Exchange	3	Brian Taylor	Harvey Leader	Mrs R Mildwood	2:41.60
1969	Frontier Goddess	3	Duncan Keith	Peter Walwyn	Christopher Spence	2:38.40
1970	Lupe	3	Sandy Barclay	Noel Murless	Gladys Joel	2:40.00
1971	Fleet Wahine	3	Geoff Lewis	Harry Thomson Jones	R Ohrstrom	2:37.60
1972	Attica Meli	3	Geoff Lewis	Noel Murless	Louis Freedman	2:30.90
1973	Mysterious	3	Geoff Lewis	Noel Murless	George Pope, Jr.	2:41.50
1974	Dibidale	3	Willie Carson	Barry Hills	Nick Robinson	2:36.94
1975	May Hill	3	Pat Eddery	Peter Walwyn	Percival Williams	2:35.33
1976	Sarah Siddons	3	Christy Roche	Paddy Prendergast	J R Mullion	2:33.82
1977	Busaca	3	Pat Eddery	Peter Walwyn	Marianne Esterhazy	2:34.02
1978	Fair Salinia	3	Greville Starkey	Michael Stoute	Sven Hanson	2:32.48
1979	Connaught Bridge	3	Joe Mercer	Henry Cecil	H Barker	2:34.75
1980	Shoot A Line	3	Lester Piggott	Dick Hern	Arthur Budgett	2:36.33
1981	Condessa	3	Declan Gillespie	Jim Bolger	Paddy Barrett	2:35.32
1982	Awaasif	3	Lester Piggott	John Dunlop	Sheikh Mohammed	2:30.57
1983	Sun Princess	3	Willie Carson	Dick Hern	Sir Michael Sobell	2:36.12
1984	Circus Plume	3	Willie Carson	John Dunlop	Sir Robin McAlpine	2:34.97
1985	Sally Brown	3	Walter Swinburn	Michael Stoute	Robert Cowell	2:37.24
1986	Untold	3	Greville Starkey	Michael Stoute	Sheikh Mohammed	2:30.37
1987	Bint Pasha	3	Richard Quinn	Paul Cole	Prince Fahd bin Salman	2:38.45
1988	Diminuendo	3	Steve Cauthen	Henry Cecil	Sheikh Mohammed	2:25.79
1989	Roseate Tern	3	Willie Carson	Dick Hern	7th Earl of Carnarvon	2:31.58
1990	Hellenic	3	Willie Carson	Michael Stoute	Lord Weinstock	2:28.14
1991	Magnificent Star	3	Tony Cruz	Mohammed Moubarak	Ecurie Fustok	2:35.92
1992	User Friendly	3	George Duffield	Clive Brittain	Bill Gredley	2:29.41
1993	Only Royale	4	Ray Cochrane	Luca Cumani	Giuseppe Sainaghi	2:31.76
1994	Only Royale	5	Frankie Dettori	Luca Cumani	Giuseppe Sainaghi	2:28.07
1995	Pure Grain	3	John Reid	Michael Stoute	Robert Barnett	2:28.68
1996	Key Change	3	Johnny Murtagh	John Oxx	Lady Clague	2:27.56
1997	My Emma	4	Darryll Holland	Rae Guest	Matthews Breeding	2:30.59
1998	Catchascatchcan	3	Kieren Fallon	Henry Cecil	Lord Howard de Walden	2:26.06
1999	Ramruma	3	Pat Eddery	Henry Cecil	Prince Fahd bin Salman	2:29.17
2000	Petrushka	3	Johnny Murtagh	Sir Michael Stoute	Highclere Racing Ltd	2:29.41
2001	Super Tassa	5	Kevin Darley	Valfredo Valiani	Valfredo Valiani	2:30.17
2002	Islington	3	Kieren Fallon	Sir Michael Stoute	Exors of Lord Weinstock	2:26.74
2003	Islington	4	Kieren Fallon	Sir Michael Stoute	Exors of Lord Weinstock	2:27.44
2004	Quiff	3	Kieren Fallon	Sir Michael Stoute	Khalid Abdullah	2:38.03
2005	Punctilious	4	Kerrin McEvoy	Saeed bin Suroor	Godolphin	2:28.76
2006	Alexandrova	3	Michael Kinane	Aidan O'Brien	Magnier / Tabor / Smith	2:32.41
2007	Peeping Fawn	3	Johnny Murtagh	Aidan O'Brien	Tabor / Magnier	2:32.70
2008 (Note: The 2008 running took place at Newmarket)	Lush Lashes	3	Kevin Manning	Jim Bolger	Jackie Bolger	2:25.11
2009	Dar Re Mi	4	Jimmy Fortune	John Gosden	Lord Lloyd-Webber	2:30.98
2010	Midday	4	Tom Queally	Henry Cecil	Khalid Abdullah	2:30.53
2011	Blue Bunting	3	Frankie Dettori	Mahmood Al Zarooni	Godolphin	2:35.34
2012	Shareta	4	Christophe Lemaire	Alain de Royer-Dupré	Aga Khan IV	2:33.87
2013	The Fugue	4	William Buick	John Gosden	Lord Lloyd-Webber	2:28.29
2014	Tapestry	3	Ryan Moore	Aidan O'Brien	Magnier / Tabor / Smith / Flaxman	2:28.59
2015	Pleascach	3	Kevin Manning	Jim Bolger	Godolphin	2:32.77
2016	Seventh Heaven	3	Colm O'Donoghue	Aidan O'Brien	Magnier / Tabor / Smith	2:28.50
2017	Enable	3	Frankie Dettori	John Gosden	Khalid Abdullah	2:35.79
2018	Sea of Class	3	James Doyle	William Haggas	Sunderland Holding Inc	2:30.44
2019	Enable	5	Frankie Dettori	John Gosden	Khalid Abdullah	2:29.90
2020	Love	3	Ryan Moore	Aidan O'Brien	Tabor / Smith / Magnier	2:31.31
2021	Snowfall	3	Ryan Moore	Aidan O'Brien	Smith / Magnier / Tabor	2:26.61
2022	Alpinista	5	Luke Morris	Sir Mark Prescott	Kirsten Rausing	2:29.92
2023	Warm Heart	3	James Doyle	Aidan O'Brien	Magnier /Tabor / Smith / Westerberg	2:25.86
2024	Content	3	Ryan Moore	Aidan O'Brien	Westerberg/Tabor / Smith / Magnier	2:28.75
2025	Minnie Hauk	3	Ryan Moore	Aidan O'Brien	Smith /Magnier / Tabor	2:26.67
2026	Kalpana	5	Colin Keane	Andrew Balding	Juddmonte	2:36.00

== Earlier winners ==
- 1849: Ellen Middleton
- 1850: Brightonia
- 1851: Vivandiere
- 1852: Adine
- 1853: Mayfair
- 1854: Virago
- 1855: Capucine
- 1856: Victoria
- 1857: Tasmania
- 1858: The Argosy
- 1859: Bilberry
- 1860: Stockade
- 1861: Brown Duchess
- 1862: Feu de Joie
- 1863: Miss Armstrong
- 1864: Gondola
- 1865: Klarinska
- 1866: Lady Vane
- 1867: Ines
- 1868: Leonie
- 1869: Toison d'Or
- 1870: Gertrude
- 1871: Rebecca
- 1872: Maid of Perth
- 1873: Marie Stuart
- 1874: The Pique
- 1875: Spinaway
- 1876: Zee
- 1877: Lady Golightly
- 1878: Jannette
- 1879: Wheel of Fortune
- 1880: Belfry
- 1881: Thebais
- 1882: Dutch Oven
- 1883: Britomartis
- 1884: Clochette
- 1885: St Helena
- 1886: Philosophy
- 1887: Reve d'Or
- 1888: Briar-root
- 1889: Antibes
- 1890: Ponza
- 1891: Charm
- 1892: Gantlet
- 1893: Siffleuse
- 1894: Spring Ray
- 1895: Nighean
- 1896: Helm
- 1897: Fortalice
- 1898: Fairmile
- 1899: Victoria May

== See also ==
- Horse racing in Great Britain
- List of British flat horse races
