= Kentucky Gold =

American-bred Thoroughbred racehorse

- Sire: Raise A Native
- Grandsire: Native Dancer
- Dam: Gold Digger
- Damsire: Nashua
- Sex: Stallion
- Foaled: 14 February 1973
- Country: United States
- Colour: Bay
- Breeder: Leslie Combs II
- Owner: Wallace Gilroy
- Trainer: Richard J. Fischer
- Record: 7: 1-0-3
- Earnings: $5,950

Kentucky Gold (foaled 14 February 1973) was a Thoroughbred racehorse who was sold for a world-record $625,000 ($4 million inflation adjusted) in 1974. As a racehorse, he won one minor race from seven starts. He was then retired to stud and sired the winners of many minor races.

== Background ==
Kentucky Gold was a bay horse bred in Kentucky by Leslie Combs II of Spendhrift Farm. Having been sired by Raise A Native out of the mare Gold Digger he was a full-brother to Mr. Prospector.

At the Keeneland Sales in July 1974 the yearling was sold for a then world-recond price of $625,000, with Mr & Mrs W Gilroy of Chicago winning the auction. He broke the record set a year earlier by Wajima. He was the fifth Spendthrift graduate to hold the record following One Bold Bid, Bold Discovery, Majestic Prince and Crowned Prince.

== Racing career ==
Kentucky Gold was sent into training with Richard J. Fischer. His racing career consisted of seven starts as a three-year-old in 1976. After finishing third at Hollywood Park Racetrack on his debut in a maiden race in April he finished unplaced in two similar events at the same track before winning a maiden at Delaware Park on August 15. He then finished fourth at Keystone Park and finished third in two allowance races at Keeneland in October.

== Stud record ==
Kentucky Gold was retired from racing to become a breeding stallion. He was not particularly successful, but did sire some prolific winners of minor races in North America including Golden Tumiga (twenty-six wins), Native of Kentucky (twenty-one wins), Golden Occasion (thirteen wins) and Fort Worth (thirteen wins). Kentucky Gold died in 2001.

== Pedigree ==
Pedigree of Kentucky Gold, bay stallion, 1973
Sire Raise A Native (USA) 1961	Native Dancer (USA); 1950	Polynesian	Unbreakable
Sire Raise A Native (USA) 1961	Native Dancer (USA); 1950	Polynesian	Black Polly
Sire Raise A Native (USA) 1961	Native Dancer (USA); 1950	Geisha	Discovery
Sire Raise A Native (USA) 1961	Native Dancer (USA); 1950	Geisha	Miyako
Sire Raise A Native (USA) 1961	Raise You (USA); 1946	Case Ace	Teddy
Sire Raise A Native (USA) 1961	Raise You (USA); 1946	Case Ace	Sweetheart
Sire Raise A Native (USA) 1961	Raise You (USA); 1946	Lady Glory	American Flag
Sire Raise A Native (USA) 1961	Raise You (USA); 1946	Lady Glory	Beloved
Dam Gold Digger (USA) 1962	Nashua (USA); 1952	Nasrullah	Nearco
Dam Gold Digger (USA) 1962	Nashua (USA); 1952	Nasrullah	Mumtaz Begum
Dam Gold Digger (USA) 1962	Nashua (USA); 1952	Segula	Johnstown
Dam Gold Digger (USA) 1962	Nashua (USA); 1952	Segula	Sekhmet
Dam Gold Digger (USA) 1962	Sequence (USA); 1946	Count Fleet	Reigh Count
Dam Gold Digger (USA) 1962	Sequence (USA); 1946	Count Fleet	Quickly
Dam Gold Digger (USA) 1962	Sequence (USA); 1946	Miss Dogwood	Bull Dog
Dam Gold Digger (USA) 1962	Sequence (USA); 1946	Miss Dogwood	Myrtlewood (Family 13-c)

Records
Preceded by Wajima	Most expensive Thoroughbred colt yearling July 1974 – July 1975	Next: Elegant Prince
