= Rachel Hood =

English classic-winning thoroughbred racehorse owner and politician

Cllr Rachel Hood
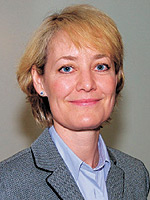

Suffolk County Councillor for Exning & Newmarket
- In office 4 May 2017 – 2026
- Preceded by: Dave Hudson

West Suffolk District Councillor for Newmarket East
- Incumbent
- Assumed office 2 May 2019
- Preceded by: Seat created

Forest Heath District Councillor for Severals
- In office 5 May 2011 – 7 May 2015
- Preceded by: Ian Radford
- Succeeded by: Andrew Appleby

Personal details
- Born: September 1953 (age 73)
- Party: Conservative
- Spouse: John Gosden
- Children: 4
- Education: Clare College, Cambridge (LLB)
- Occupation: Lawyer

Rachel Dene Serena Hood (born September 1953) is an English barrister, American attorney, classic-winning thoroughbred racehorse owner, local politician, and community activist. She is best known as the owner of Jack Hobbs, winner of the Irish Derby and Dubai Sheema Classic and for her chairwomanship of the Racehorse Owners' Association (ROA).

Educated at Millfield School and Clare College, Cambridge — where she was among the first cohort of women admitted — Hood read law and subsequently practised as a barrister in England before qualifying as an attorney in California, where she lived while her husband began training racehorses. Following the couple's move to Clarehaven Stables in Newmarket in 2006, she founded the campaign group Save Historic Newmarket, which became a significant force in both local government and national planning law, most notably in its decade-long fight against the Hatchfield Farm development. She was elected to Newmarket Town Council in 2011 and has served on West Suffolk Council and Suffolk County Council in various roles since.

== Early life and education ==
Hood attended Millfield School in Street, Somerset on an academic scholarship and read law at Clare College, Cambridge, after being encouraged to apply by her history teacher. She was among the first cohort of female students to study at the college, Clare had admitted its first female undergraduates only in October 1972, making it one of the first three formerly all-male Cambridge colleges to become co-educational, alongside Churchill and King's. Hood won a blue for fencing and whilst coxing for her college, Clare, she met her husband John Gosden who was rowing for Emmanuel.

== Legal career ==
After graduating from Cambridge, Hood trained as a barrister in England and was called to the Bar. She subsequently practised at the English Bar, where she became the youngest woman to appear in a case at the European Court of Human Rights. She then moved to California with her husband John Gosden, who had started training three horses at Santa Anita Park in Los Angeles.

In the United States she qualified separately as an attorney in the State of California, a jurisdiction with its own Bar examination and admission requirements. Hood described her California legal career with evident affection, characterising the couple's California decade as "joyous, carefree days". She has stated candidly: "Truthfully, I didn't want to come back. I was very happy being a lawyer living up in the Hollywood hills, but it was different for John. For him, training good horses is what it's all about."

== Racehorse Owners' Association ==
Hood joined the board of the Racehorse Owners' Association (ROA) and was elected its President in 2011. As President she secured a seat on the Horsemen's Group, the body representing all participants on the supply side of British racing — owners, trainers, jockeys and stable staff — in negotiations with racecourses and bookmakers.

Her presidency was defined by a sustained campaign for what she termed a racing right — new primary legislation to replace the existing betting levy, by which bookmakers contributed a percentage of their British racing turnover to fund the sport. Hood argued that the existing mechanism was inadequate and that offshore betting was creating an accelerating "black hole" in racing's finances.

Hood's American experience directly shaped her later thinking on British racing's governance. As she explained when ROA President,"The Horsemen's Group was borne out of what John and I experienced in America. In the US, racetracks can't race until they have agreements with horsemen on prize money and the racing programme." This transatlantic perspective lent her subsequent reform efforts a comparative authority that many in British racing found compelling. The government announced in May 2016 that it would introduce the racing right.

== Horse racing career ==
Hood has owned race horses including St. Leger Stakes winner Arctic Cosmos, Nichols Canyon and Jack Hobbs. She has also bred racehorses, with broodmares producing homebred runners including Cheshire Oaks winner Gertrude Bell.

One of Hood's most celebrated moments as an owner came in September 2010, when Arctic Cosmos won the 234th running of the St. Leger Stakes at Doncaster Racecourse. Arctic Cosmos was a bay colt bred in Kentucky from the first crop of 2004 Epsom Derby winner North Light, out of the Marquetry mare Fifth Avenue Doll. He had been purchased as a yearling at Tattersalls for 47,000 guineas by Blandford Bloodstock on behalf of Hood and her husband, and subsequently partially sold to financier Robin Geffen.

Arctic Cosmos started the St. Leger in a field including Snow Fairy (who had won both the Oaks and the Irish Oaks that season), Rewilding and the Irish Derby runner-up Midas Touch. Ridden by William Buick, Arctic Cosmos tracked the leaders before asserting approaching the final furlong, winning by one and three-quarter lengths from Midas Touch, with outsider Corsica in third. Hood noted a remarkable historical parallel: to her knowledge, only one other English trainer had previously produced a Classic winner for his own wife — Sir Noel Murless, who trained Caergwrle to win the 1,000 Guineas for his wife Gwen in 1968.

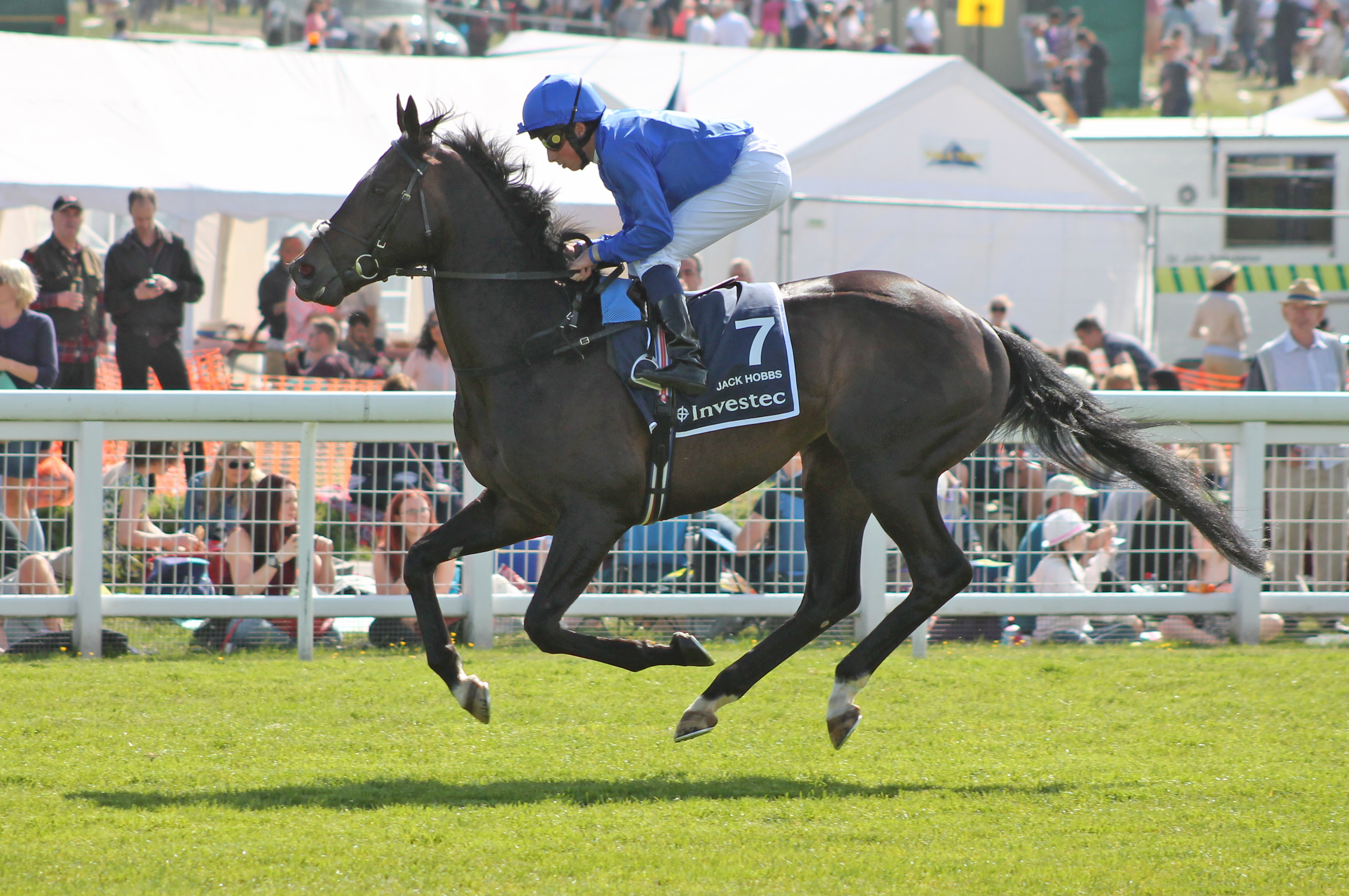
Jack Hobbs and William Buick going to post

Jack Hobbs won his first race as a three-year-old at Sandown Park Racecourse in April 2015, ridden by Frankie Dettori, winning a ten-furlong handicap by twelve lengths and immediately attracting attention as a potential Epsom Derby contender. He ran second to his stablemate Golden Horn in the Dante Stakes at York Racecourse, and again at Epsom in the 236th Derby Stakes, finishing three and a half lengths behind Golden Horn in second place with William Buick in the saddle.

Three weeks later, Jack Hobbs won the Irish Derby at The Curragh, the 150th running of the race. He was the first British-trained colt to win the Irish Derby since Commander in Chief in 1993. He subsequently won the September Stakes at Kempton Park Racecourse. He later won the Dubai Sheema Classic at Meydan Racecourse on Dubai World Cup Night.

== Save Historic Newmarket ==
=== Background and founding (2006–2008) ===
Shortly after she moved back to Newmarket in 2006, Hood witnessed an episode that she has described as galvanising her entire subsequent civic career. Driving down Newmarket's Bury Road — lined with Victorian stables — she observed mature copper beech trees, estimated to be around 200 years old, being felled to make way for a block of modern flats. The experience revealed, she later said, that "nobody was minding the shop" in a town whose entire economy and cultural identity depended on its unique status as a horse-racing centre.

Hood responded by helping to start Save Historic Newmarket, an action group dedicated to highlighting development proposals that could harm the town's employment, businesses and character. The group attracted support from across the town, including the Jockey Club, Tattersalls, Godolphin and local businesses.

=== The Hatchfield Farm dispute (2008–2020) ===
The first major for Save Historic Newmarket's activism was the proposed development of Hatchfield Farm, a 67-hectare greenfield site on the outskirts of Newmarket belonging to the Earl of Derby. Hood chaired the Save Historic Newmarket Action Group throughout an extraordinary decade of planning battles that involved multiple public inquiries, judicial review proceedings in the High Court, appeals, and government call-ins.

=== George Lambton Playing Fields (2011-2013) ===
The second major campaign Save Historic Newmarket engaged was against a proposal to build a Sainsbury's supermarket on the George Lambton Playing Fields, Newmarket's communal recreational ground on Fordham Road. The George Lambton Playing Fields are named after the celebrated Newmarket trainer George Lambton and are held under a 100-year lease granted to the people of Newmarket by the Lambton family in 1979, expiring in 2068. The application was refused ensuring the playing fields were protected from commercial development.

== Political career ==
=== Entry into local government ===
Hood stood for election to both Newmarket Town Council and Forest Heath District Council in 2011 and was successful on both counts. She was elected Chair of the Development and Planning Committee of Newmarket Town Council — a role directly relevant to her advocacy on planning matters. In interviews she explained her motivation: "It became apparent that (local businesses) were not represented on either council and it seemed that the only way forward was for some of us to be involved. I did not want Newmarket to be ruined on my watch."

=== Mayor of Newmarket ===
Hood has served as Mayor of Newmarket on three occasions, her first mayoralty was in 2014–15. She was elected for a second term in May 2018 and for a third term thereafter, serving as Mayor during the COVID-19 pandemic of 2020.

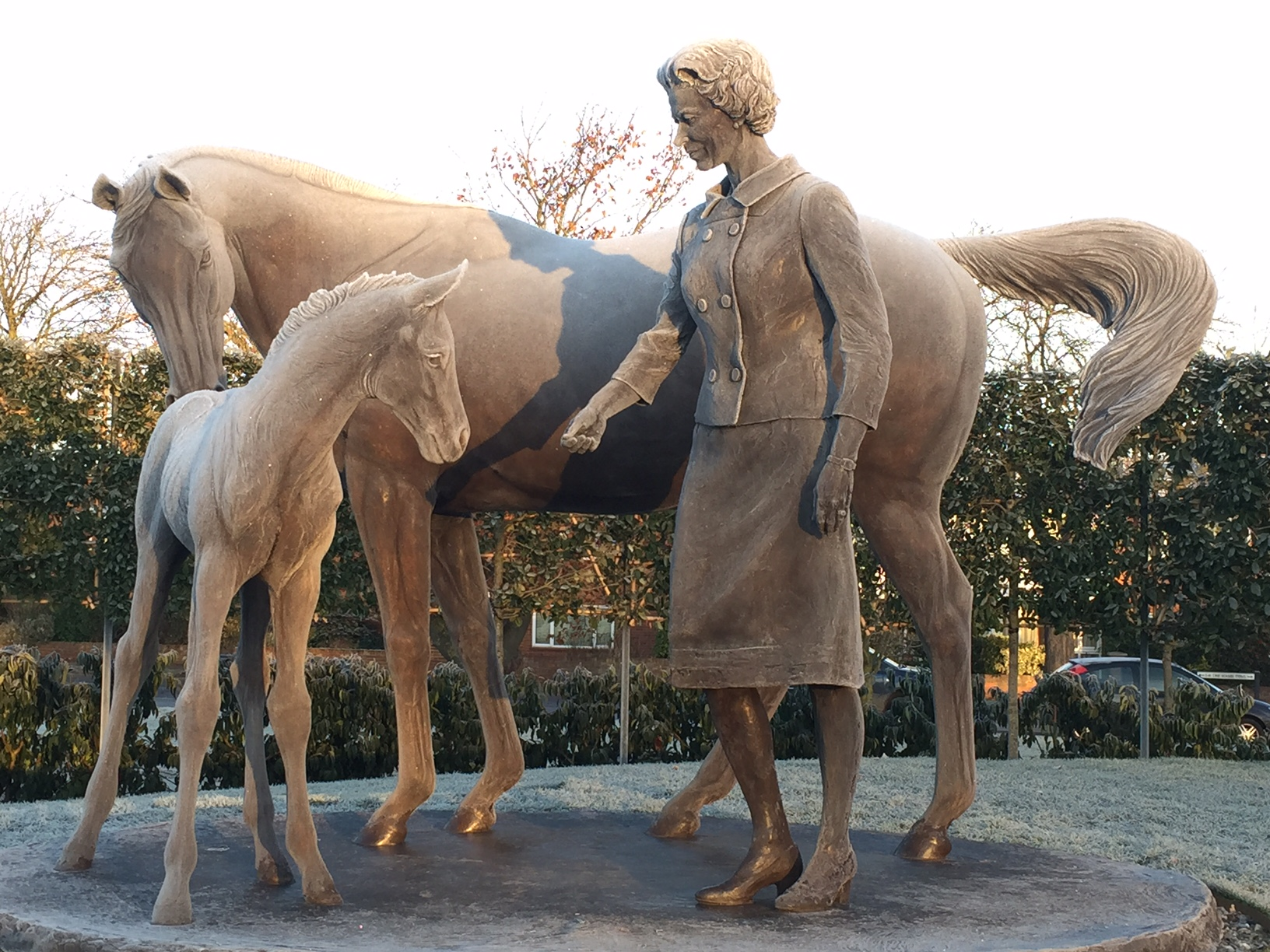
A statue of the Queen in Newmarket, Suffolk

During her 2020 mayoralty, Hood and fellow councillor Andy Drummond conceived and implemented the Newmarket Covid Community Helpline — a town council telephone service launched in late March 2020 to assist vulnerable and shielding residents with shopping, prescription collection, dog-walking and related needs. Hood manned the helpline for two hours every day during its operation.

=== Newmarket Neighbourhood Plan ===
Hood chaired the Newmarket Neighbourhood Plan Group throughout its work — a multi-year process by which local residents developed planning policies specific to Newmarket under the provisions of the Localism Act 2011. The Newmarket Neighbourhood Plan was put to a referendum in 2019 and successfully passed, after which it was formally adopted.

=== West Suffolk Council ===
After Forest Heath District Council and the Borough of St Edmundsbury merged, Hood was elected to West Suffolk Council in 2019 and re-elected in 2023. She served on the Local Plan Working Group throughout this period and as Chair of the Development & Planning Committee in 2023–24. She also chaired the West Suffolk Council Environment & Climate Change Task Force, which reported to the council in 2020 and supported the Suffolk Climate Emergency Declaration.

=== Suffolk County Council ===
Hood was first elected to Suffolk County Council for the Exning and Newmarket division in 2017 and re-elected in May 2021.

== Personal life ==
Hood has been a trustee of the Organic Research Centre, chairwoman of the National Horseracing Museum and a director of Cambridge Woman's Aid.

She met her husband, racehorse trainer John Gosden, whilst they were both students at Cambridge. She has four children, Sebastian, Serena, Theodora and Thaddeus, and lives in Newmarket.
