= Deep Diver (horse) =

Irish-bred Thoroughbred racehorse

- Sire: Gulf Pearl
- Grandsire: Persian Gulf
- Dam: Miss Stephen
- Damsire: Stephen Paul
- Sex: Stallion
- Foaled: 1969
- Country: Ireland
- Colour: Chestnut
- Breeder: George Harris
- Owner: David Robinson
- Trainer: Paul Davey
- Record: 15: 9-4-1

Major wins
- Brocklesby Stakes (1971); July Stakes (1971); Prix d'Arenberg (1971); Cornwallis Stakes (1971); Prix du Petit Couvert (1971); Nunthorpe Stakes (1972); Prix de l'Abbaye (1972)

Awards
- Timeform top-rated two-year-old (1971); Timeform top-rated three-year-old (1972); Timeform rating 134

Deep Diver (4 May 1969 – 13 June 1986) was an Irish-bred, British-trained Thoroughbred racehorse and sire. As a two-year-old in 1971 he won seven of his eleven races including the Brocklesby Stakes, July Stakes, Prix d'Arenberg, Cornwallis Stakes and Prix du Petit Couvert. In the following year he took time to reproduce his best form but emerged as the best sprinter in Europe with decisive wins in the Nunthorpe Stakes and Prix de l'Abbaye. Timeform rated Deep Diver the best racehorse of his generation in Europe at both two and three years of age. He has been retrospectively rated as one of the best British-trained sprinters of the 20th century. Deep Diver stood as a breeding stallion in Ireland, Australia and Japan but had little success as a sire of winners.

== Background ==
Deep Diver was a strongly-built chestnut horse with a narrow white stripe bred at the Victor Stud in County Tipperary by George Harris. His sire, Gulf Pearl, won the Imperial Stakes in 1964 and the Chester Vase in 1965: he also sired the Coronation Cup winner Sea Chimes. Deep Diver's dam Miss Stephen never raced, but was a successful broodmare who also produced the Irish 2,000 Guineas winner King's Company.

As a yearling, Deep Diver was sent to the sales in where he was bought for 8,400 guineas by Lord Harrington acting on behalf of the businessman and philanthropist David Robinson. The colt was sent to Robinson's Clarehaven Stables where he was trained by Paul Davey (1926–2007).

== Racing career ==
=== 1971: two-year-old season ===
Deep Diver made his racecourse debut on 27 March when he won the Brocklesby Stakes at Doncaster Racecourse by seven lengths. He followed up with wins at Kempton in April and York in May before being moved up in class at Royal Ascot in June. He started favourite for the New Stakes over five furlongs but seemed unsuited by the soft ground and finished third of the four runners behind Philip of Spain. Deep Diver's next race was the Group Three July Stakes over six furlongs at Newmarket Racecourse. Starting at odds of 4/1 and ridden by Frankie Durr, he won comfortably from his stable companion Wishing Star, which had been favoured in the betting.

In the previous year, Robinson and Davey had dominated the major French two-year-old races with My Swallow and in late summer they attempted to repeat the feat with Deep Diver. In July at Maisons-Laffitte Racecourse he contested the Group One Prix Robert Papin over 1100m but finished second to the Dick Hern-trained Sun Prince. A month later at Deauville Racecourse he finished fourth behind Daring Display in the Prix Morny over 1200m.

On his return to Britain Deep Diver ran in the Norfolk Stakes (the race now known as the Flying Childers Stakes) at Doncaster in September and sustained his third consecutive defeat as he was beaten by the filly Rose Dubarry. Later that month he was sent to France again and won the Prix d'Arenberg over 1000m at Longchamp Racecourse. In October he was ridden by the Australian jockey Bill Williamson in the Cornwallis Stakes over five furlongs at Ascot. He started the 4/7 favourite and won from Mansingh. In late October he was matched against older horses in the Group Two Prix du Petit Couvert over 1000m at Longchamp. He became the first British-trained horse to succeed the race as he won by five lengths in a course record time from the four-year-old Montgomery, the winner of the Prix du Gros Chêne and the Prix de Saint-Georges.

=== 1972: three-year-old season ===
Like many of the horses at Clarehaven, Deep Diver was affected by a viral infection in the spring of 1972, and took a long time to reach peak fitness. On his only start in the early part of the year he finished second to the five-year-old Shiny Tenth in the Palace House Stakes over five furlongs at Newmarket. Two months later at Goodwood Racecourse he was ridden by Lester Piggott in the King George Stakes. He took the lead in the closing stages and looked likely to win, but was caught in the last stride and beaten a short head by the filly Stilvi. The winning time was a new course record.

At York Racecourse in August, Deep Diver faced a field which included Stilvi, Rose Dubarry and the July Cup winner Parsimony in the Nunthorpe Stakes. Ridden by Williamson, he started at odds of 100/30 and won by two lengths from Stilvi in a new course record time of 57.7 seconds. In October he ended his career in the Group One Prix de l'Abbaye over 1000m at Longchamp. Despite an unfavourable draw he was never seriously challenged and won by four lengths from Home Guard. Plans to run the colt in the Prix du Couvert were abandoned because of the prevailing soft ground.

== Assessment ==
In the 1971 Free Handicap, a rating of the best two-year-olds to have raced in Britain, Deep Diver was given a weight of 125 pounds, eight pounds below the top-rated Crowned Prince. In the equivalent French classification he was given 129 pounds, placing him fourth behind Hard to Beat, Steel Pulse and Riverman. The independent Timeform organisation, however, rated him the best juvenile of the season, with a rating of 134. In the following year, Timeform again rated Deep Diver on 134, placing him level with Sallust as the season's top-rated three-year-old colt. In their book, A Century of Champions, based on the Timeform rating system, John Randall and Tony Morris rated Deep Diver the eighteenth-best British or Irish sprinter of the 20th century.

== Stud record ==
At the end of his three-year-old season, Deep Diver was sold for £400,000 to John Magnier and was retired to become a breeding stallion at the Castle Hyde stud in Ireland. He was one of the first "shuttle" stallions, meaning that he was based in Europe for part of the year before being sent to Australia for the southern hemisphere breeding season. He had little success as a sire of winners in either country and was later exported to Japan. Some of his daughters became successful broodmares: he was the damsire of the Sir Rupert Clarke Stakes winner Submariner and he also featured in the pedigree of Apache Cat. The Japanese Stud Book notes that he was "put out of stud" in January 1986.

== Pedigree ==
Pedigree of Deep Diver (IRE), chestnut stallion 1969
| Sire Gulf Pearl (GB) 1962 | Persian Gulf (GB); 1940 | Bahram | Blandford |
| Sire Gulf Pearl (GB) 1962 | Persian Gulf (GB); 1940 | Bahram | Friar's Daughter* |
| Sire Gulf Pearl (GB) 1962 | Persian Gulf (GB); 1940 | Double Life | Bachelor's Double |
| Sire Gulf Pearl (GB) 1962 | Persian Gulf (GB); 1940 | Double Life | Saint Joan |
| Sire Gulf Pearl (GB) 1962 | Nan (GB); 1955 | Nearco | Pharos* |
| Sire Gulf Pearl (GB) 1962 | Nan (GB); 1955 | Nearco | Nogara |
| Sire Gulf Pearl (GB) 1962 | Nan (GB); 1955 | Maryaka | Marsyas |
| Sire Gulf Pearl (GB) 1962 | Nan (GB); 1955 | Maryaka | Nokka |
| Dam Miss Stephen (IRE) 1955 | Stephen Paul (GB); 1948 | Panorama | Sir Cosmo |
| Dam Miss Stephen (IRE) 1955 | Stephen Paul (GB); 1948 | Panorama | Happy Climax |
| Dam Miss Stephen (IRE) 1955 | Stephen Paul (GB); 1948 | Paradise | Dastur* |
| Dam Miss Stephen (IRE) 1955 | Stephen Paul (GB); 1948 | Paradise | Wandsworth |
| Dam Miss Stephen (IRE) 1955 | Bright Set (GB); 1950 | Denturius | Gold Bridge |
| Dam Miss Stephen (IRE) 1955 | Bright Set (GB); 1950 | Denturius | La Solfatara |
| Dam Miss Stephen (IRE) 1955 | Bright Set (GB); 1950 | Firelight | Signal Light* |
| Dam Miss Stephen (IRE) 1955 | Bright Set (GB); 1950 | Firelight | Four Fires (Family: 13-e) |

* Deep Diver is inbred 4S x 5D to the mare Friar's Daugther, meaning that she appears fourth generation on the sire side of his pedigree, and fifth generation (via Dastur) on the dam side of his pedigree.

* Deep Diver is inbred 4S x 5D to the stallion Pharos, meaning that he appears fourth generation on the sire side of his pedigree, and fifth generation (via Signal Light) on the dam side of his pedigree.
