= Elegant Prince =

American-bred Thoroughbred racehorse

- Sire: Raise a Native
- Grandsire: Native Dancer
- Dam: Gay Hostess
- Damsire: Royal Charger
- Sex: Stallion
- Foaled: 15 March 1974
- Died: 2000
- Country: United States
- Colour: Chestnut
- Breeder: Leslie Combs II and Frank McMahon
- Owner: Franklin Groves
- Record: Unraced

Elegant Prince (15 March 1974 – 2000) was a Thoroughbred racehorse sold for a world-record $715,000 ($4.2 million inflation adjusted) in 1975. He never raced nor had success as a breeding stallion.

== Background ==
Elegant Prince was a chestnut horse with a white blaze bred in Kentucky by Leslie Combs II of Spendthrift Farm and Canadian oilman Frank McMahon. He was sired by Raise a Native, an American racehorse who was unbeaten in four races and was named American Champion Two-Year-Old Colt by Turf and Sports Digest in 1963. Elegant Prince's dam Gay Hostess was a highly-successful broodmare, having produced Majestic Prince and Crowned Prince (Dewhurst Stakes) from two previous coverings by Raise a Native. Her other descendants have included Real Quiet, Caracolero and The Derby winner Secreto.

At the Keeneland Sales in July 1975 the yearling was sold for a then world-recond price of $715,000, with Franklin Groves winning the auction ahead of the Canadian Ted Burnett. He broke the record set a year earlier by another Spendthrift graduate Kentucky Gold. Both Majestic Prince and Crowned Prince had previously held the record.

== Racing career ==
Elegant Prince was trained in the United States and was later transferred to Ireland. He did not race in either country.

== Stud record ==
Elegant Prince was retired to stud in 1979 but had little success as a sire of winners. He died in 2000.

== Pedigree ==
Pedigree of Elegant Prince, chestnut stallion, 1974
Sire Raise a Native (USA) 1961	Native Dancer (USA); 1950	Polynesian	Unbreakable
Sire Raise a Native (USA) 1961	Native Dancer (USA); 1950	Polynesian	Black Polly
Sire Raise a Native (USA) 1961	Native Dancer (USA); 1950	Geisha	Discovery
Sire Raise a Native (USA) 1961	Native Dancer (USA); 1950	Geisha	Miyako
Sire Raise a Native (USA) 1961	Raise You (USA); 1946	Case Ace	Teddy
Sire Raise a Native (USA) 1961	Raise You (USA); 1946	Case Ace	Sweetheart
Sire Raise a Native (USA) 1961	Raise You (USA); 1946	Lady Glory	American Flag
Sire Raise a Native (USA) 1961	Raise You (USA); 1946	Lady Glory	Beloved
Dam Gay Hostess (USA) 1957	Royal Charger (GB); 1942	Nearco	Pharos
Dam Gay Hostess (USA) 1957	Royal Charger (GB); 1942	Nearco	Nogara
Dam Gay Hostess (USA) 1957	Royal Charger (GB); 1942	Sun Princess	Solario
Dam Gay Hostess (USA) 1957	Royal Charger (GB); 1942	Sun Princess	Mumtaz Begum
Dam Gay Hostess (USA) 1957	Your Hostess (USA); 1949	Alibhai	Hyperion
Dam Gay Hostess (USA) 1957	Your Hostess (USA); 1949	Alibhai	Teresina
Dam Gay Hostess (USA) 1957	Your Hostess (USA); 1949	Boudoir II	Mahmoud
Dam Gay Hostess (USA) 1957	Your Hostess (USA); 1949	Boudoir II	Kampala (Family 4-d)

Records
Preceded by Kentucky Gold	Most expensive Thoroughbred colt yearling July 1975 – July 1976	Next: Canadian Bound
