= Crowned Prince =

American-bred Thoroughbred racehorse

- Sire: Raise a Native
- Grandsire: Native Dancer
- Dam: Gay Hostess
- Damsire: Royal Charger
- Sex: Stallion
- Foaled: 31 January 1969
- Country: United States
- Colour: Chestnut
- Breeder: Leslie Combs II & Frank McMahon
- Owner: Frank McMahon
- Trainer: Bernard van Cutsem
- Record: 4: 2-0-0

Major wins
- Champagne Stakes (1971); Dewhurst Stakes (1971)

Awards
- Timeform rating 128; Top-rated British two-year-old (1972)

Crowned Prince (31 January 1969 – 18 February 1989) was a Kentucky-bred, British-trained Thoroughbred racehorse who was sold for a world-record $510,000 ($4.1 million inflation adjusted) in 1970. In a brief racing career he established himself as the leading British juvenile of his generation in 1971 with win in the Group Two Champagne Stakes and the Group One Dewhurst Stakes. He was retired from racing after a single, unsuccessful start in the following spring and had little success as a breeding stallion.

== Background ==
Crowned Prince was a chestnut horse with a white star and white socks on his hind feet bred in Kentucky by Leslie Combs II of Spendthrift Farm and Frank McMahon. He was sired by Raise a Native, an American racehorse who was unbeaten in four races and was named American Champion Two-Year-Old Colt by Turf and Sports Digest in 1963. Crowned Prince's dam Gay Hostess was a highly-successful broodmare, having produced Majestic Prince from a previous coverings by Raise a Native. Her other descendants have included Real Quiet, Caracolero and The Derby winner Secreto.

At the Keeneland Sales in July 1970 the yearling was sold for a then world-recond price of $510,000, breaking the record set two years earlier by the filly Reine Enchanteur, with McMahon buying out his partner Combs. Majestic Prince had previously held the record as well as the other Spendthrift graduates One Bold Bid and Bold Discovery.

The colt was sent into training with Bernard Van Cutsem at his Stanley House stable at Newmarket, Suffolk. At the time, Van Cutsem was one of the most successful trainers in Britain, handling major winners including Park Top (King George VI and Queen Elizabeth Stakes) and Karabas (Washington, D.C. International Stakes).

== Racing career ==
As a two-year-old in 1972, Crowned Prince was a member of an exceptional team of juveniles trained by Van Cutsem which also include High Top and Sharpen Up. Crowned Prince won two of his three races. At Doncaster Racecourse in September he contested the Champagne Stakes over seven furlongs. Ridden by Lester Piggott he started the 11/10 favourite and won from the Barry Hills-trained Rheingold. In the Dewhurst Stakes at Newmarket Racecourse a month later he was matched against Rheingold and won by five lengths at odds of 4/9.

In the following year hear he finished fourth in the Craven Stakes after which he was found to have developed a soft palate problem and was retired from racing.

== Assessment ==
There was no International Classification of European two-year-olds in 1971: the official handicappers of Britain, Ireland and France compiled separate rankings for horses which competed in those countries. In the British Free Handicap, Crowned Prince was the best two-year-old of the season by a two-pound margin from his stable companion High Top. The independent Timeform organisation, however, rated him six pounds inferior to Deep Diver.

== Stud record ==
As a breeding stallion, Crowned Prince stood in Ireland and shuttled to Australia before being exported to Japan in 1978.

== Pedigree ==
Pedigree of Crowned Prince, chestnut stallion, 1969
Sire Raise a Native (USA) 1961	Native Dancer (USA); 1950	Polynesian	Unbreakable
Sire Raise a Native (USA) 1961	Native Dancer (USA); 1950	Polynesian	Black Polly
Sire Raise a Native (USA) 1961	Native Dancer (USA); 1950	Geisha	Discovery
Sire Raise a Native (USA) 1961	Native Dancer (USA); 1950	Geisha	Miyako
Sire Raise a Native (USA) 1961	Raise You (USA); 1946	Case Ace	Teddy
Sire Raise a Native (USA) 1961	Raise You (USA); 1946	Case Ace	Sweetheart
Sire Raise a Native (USA) 1961	Raise You (USA); 1946	Lady Glory	American Flag
Sire Raise a Native (USA) 1961	Raise You (USA); 1946	Lady Glory	Beloved
Dam Gay Hostess (USA) 1957	Royal Charger (GB); 1942	Nearco	Pharos
Dam Gay Hostess (USA) 1957	Royal Charger (GB); 1942	Nearco	Nogara
Dam Gay Hostess (USA) 1957	Royal Charger (GB); 1942	Sun Princess	Solario
Dam Gay Hostess (USA) 1957	Royal Charger (GB); 1942	Sun Princess	Mumtaz Begum
Dam Gay Hostess (USA) 1957	Your Hostess (USA); 1949	Alibhai	Hyperion
Dam Gay Hostess (USA) 1957	Your Hostess (USA); 1949	Alibhai	Teresina
Dam Gay Hostess (USA) 1957	Your Hostess (USA); 1949	Boudoir II	Mahmoud
Dam Gay Hostess (USA) 1957	Your Hostess (USA); 1949	Boudoir II	Kampala (Family 4-d)

Records
Preceded by Reine Enchanteur	Most expensive Thoroughbred colt yearling July 1970 – July 1973	Next: Wajima
