= My Swallow =

Irish-bred Thoroughbred racehorse

- Sire: Le Levanstell
- Grandsire: Le Lavandou
- Dam: Darrigle
- Damsire: Vilmoray
- Sex: Stallion
- Foaled: 22 February 1968
- Country: Ireland
- Colour: Bay
- Breeder: Myles Walsh
- Owner: David Robinson
- Trainer: Paul Davey
- Record: 11: 8-2-1

Major wins
- Woodcote Stakes (1970); Prix du Bois (1970); Prix Robert Papin (1970); Prix Morny (1970); Prix de la Salamandre (1970); Grand Critérium (1970)

Awards
- Top-rated two-year-old in France (1970); Top-rated two-year-old in England (1970); Timeform top-rated two-year-old (1970); Timeform rating 134

My Swallow (22 February 1968 – post-1988) was an Irish-bred, British-trained Thoroughbred racehorse and sire. He won eight of his eleven races in a racing career which lasted from May 1970 until July 1971. In 1970 he was undefeated in seven races including the Woodcote Stakes, Prix du Bois, Prix Robert Papin, Prix Morny, Prix de la Salamandre and Grand Critérium. My Swallow set a record for prize money won by a two-year-old in Europe and was rated the best of an exceptional crop of European juveniles. He won on his three-year-old debut, but then finished third to Mill Reef and Brigadier Gerard in the 2000 Guineas. My Swallow finished second in his two remaining races before being retired to stud. He had moderate success as a sire of winners in the United Kingdom and Japan.

== Background ==
My Swallow was a big, powerful bay horse standing 16.3 hands high with a white blaze and white socks on his hind legs bred in Ireland by Myles Walsh. His sire was the Seamus McGrath-owned Le Levanstell, who won the Sussex Stakes and the Queen Elizabeth II Stakes in 1961 before a successful stud career. His best winner prior to My Swallow was Levmoss, who won the Ascot Gold Cup and Prix de l'Arc de Triomphe in 1969. My Swallow was the second foal of his dam Darrigle, whose other winners included the Premio Pisa winner Drobny.

As a yearling, My Swallow was sent to the sales in Dublin where he was bought for 5,000 guineas by Lord Harrington acting on behalf of the businessman and philanthropist David Robinson. The colt was sent to Robinson's Clarehaven Stables where he was trained by Paul Davey.

== Racing career ==
=== 1970: two-year-old season ===
My Swallow began his racing career with a three length victory in the Zetland Stakes over five furlongs at York Racecourse in May and then winning the Woodcote Stakes over six furlongs at Epsom in early June.

For the rest of the season, My Swallow was campaigned exclusively in France. He began his French campaign in late June when he won the Prix du Bois over 1000 metres at Longchamp Racecourse by four length from Primaticcio. In July at Maisons-Laffitte Racecourse he contested the Prix Robert Papin over 1100m in which he was matched against the American-bred, British-trained colt Mill Reef, who had won the Coventry Stakes at Royal Ascot by eight lengths. The two British challengers drew clear of the field in the closing stages, with My Swallow (ridden by Lester Piggott), prevailing by a short head after a "magnificent duel". A month later at Deauville Racecourse Piggott rode My Swallow to victory in the Prix Morny over 1200m, beating Impertinent by two lengths.

In September, My Swallow was moved up in distance for the Prix de la Salamandre over 1400m at Longchamp where he was opposed by Swing Easy, an unbeaten colt who had won the New Stakes, July Stakes and Richmond Stakes. He won the race by three and a half length from the filly La Mie au Roy and Swing Easy in a time of 1:22.2. My Swallow's last race of 1970 was France's most prestigious event for juveniles, the Grand Critérium over 1600m at Longchamp in October. He claimed his seventh consecutive race by winning from Bonami and Marche Persan, and ended the year as the top-rated two-year-old in Britain and France. He was the fifth horse, and the first since Nirgal in 1945 to win the Prix Robert Papin, Prix Morny and Grand Critérium: none of the previous four winners of this treble, however, had also won the Prix de la Salamandre. His earnings of over £88,000 set a record for a two-year-old trained in Europe.

=== 1971: three-year-old season ===
My Swallow's three-year-old season began with a win against moderate opposition in the Usher Stakes over seven furlongs at Kempton Park Racecourse in April. He then contested an exceptionally strong renewal of the 2000 Guineas over the Rowley Mile course at Newmarket Racecourse. He was opposed again by Mill Reef, who had been unbeaten since the Prix Robert Papin, winning the Gimcrack Stakes, Dewhurst Stakes and Greenham Stakes. My Swallow was ridden by Frankie Durr, having been rejected by Piggott in favour of the Vincent O'Brien-trained Minsky, a full-brother of Nijinsky. Also in the field was Brigadier Gerard, undefeated in four races including the Middle Park Stakes. Mill Reef started favourite at 6/4, with My Swallow on 2/1 and Brigadier Gerard on 11/2. My Swallow led from the start before being challenged by Mill Reef a quarter of a mile from the finish and the two colts raced side by side throughout the closing stages. Neither of them, however, had any response when Brigadier Gerard challenged along the rail. Brigadier Gerard won easily by three lengths, with Mill Reef beating My Swallow by three-quarters of a length for second.

In June, My Swallow returned to France and was matched against older horses in the Group Three Prix de la Porte Maillot over 1400m at Longchamp. He finished second, beaten six lengths by the four-year-old Faraway Son. My Swallow was brought back in distance in the following month for the weight-for-age July Cup (then a Group Two race) over six furlongs at Newmarket on 8 July. Ridden by Piggott, he finished second of the eight runners behind the four-year-old Realm.

== Assessment ==
In the Free Handicap, a rating of the season's best two-year-olds to have raced in Britain, My Swallow was given the top weight of 133 pounds, ahead of Mill Reef (132), Brigadier Gerard (131) and the filly Cawston's Pride (130). He was also the top-rated two-year-old in France. The independent Timeform organisation rated him on 134, making him their highest-rated two-year-old. In their book, A Century of Champions, based on the Timeform rating system, John Randall and Tony Morris rated My Swallow the fourth-best British or Irish two-year-old of the 20th century, after The Tetrarch, Tudor Minstrel and Tetratema.

== Stud record ==
At the end of his racing career, My Swallow was sold for £400,000 to Irving Allen and became a breeding stallion at the Derisley Wood stud in Newmarket. He stood in Britain for six years before being sold again and exported to Japan. He was not a great success in either location. The Japanese stud book noted that he was "put out of stud" on 30 September 1988. The best of his European offspring was probably Northern Spring who won the Premio Primi Passi and the Gran Criterium when unbeaten in Italy in 1975. In Japan he sired Waka Tenzan, the runner-up in the 1982 Japanese Derby. My Swallow was also the damsire of Mon Tresor (Middle Park Stakes) and Sign of Hope (Oak Tree Derby).

== Sire line tree ==
- My Swallow
  - Northern Spring
  - Lucky Cast
    - Fujiyama Kenzan
  - Waka Tenzan

== Pedigree ==
Pedigree of My Swallow (IRE), bay stallion 1968
Sire Le Levanstell (IRE) 1957	Le Lavandou (FR); 1944	Djebel	Tourbillon
Sire Le Levanstell (IRE) 1957	Le Lavandou (FR); 1944	Djebel	Loika
Sire Le Levanstell (IRE) 1957	Le Lavandou (FR); 1944	Lavande	Rustom Pasha
Sire Le Levanstell (IRE) 1957	Le Lavandou (FR); 1944	Lavande	Livadia
Sire Le Levanstell (IRE) 1957	Stella's Sister (IRE); 1950	Ballyogan	Fair Trial*
Sire Le Levanstell (IRE) 1957	Stella's Sister (IRE); 1950	Ballyogan	Serial
Sire Le Levanstell (IRE) 1957	Stella's Sister (IRE); 1950	My Aid	Knight of the Garter
Sire Le Levanstell (IRE) 1957	Stella's Sister (IRE); 1950	My Aid	Flying Aid
Dam Darrigle (GB) 1960	Vilmoray (GB); 1950	Vilmorin	Gold Bridge
Dam Darrigle (GB) 1960	Vilmoray (GB); 1950	Vilmorin	Queen of the Meadows
Dam Darrigle (GB) 1960	Vilmoray (GB); 1950	Iverley Way	Apron
Dam Darrigle (GB) 1960	Vilmoray (GB); 1950	Iverley Way	Smoke Alley
Dam Darrigle (GB) 1960	Dollar Help (GB); 1952	Fall of Clyde	Fair Trial*
Dam Darrigle (GB) 1960	Dollar Help (GB); 1952	Fall of Clyde	Hyndford Bridge
Dam Darrigle (GB) 1960	Dollar Help (GB); 1952	Dollar Crisis	Pink Flower
Dam Darrigle (GB) 1960	Dollar Help (GB); 1952	Dollar Crisis	Silver Loan (Family: 2-g)

* My Swallow is inbred 4S x 4D to the stallion Fair Trial, meaning that he appears fourth generation on the sire side of his pedigree and fourth generation on the dam side of his pedigree.
