= Woodcote Stakes =

Flat horse race in Britain

- Class: Conditions
- Location: Epsom Downs Racecourse; Epsom, England
- Inaugurated: 1794, suspended 1800 and reintroduced 1807
- Race type: Flat / Thoroughbred
- Sponsor: Betfred
- Website: Epsom Downs

Race information
- Distance: 6 furlongs 3 yards (1,210 m)
- Surface: Turf
- Track: Left-handed
- Qualification: Two-year-olds
- Weight: 9 st 2 lb Allowances; 5 lb for fillies Penalties; 5 lb for race winners
- Purse: £75,000 (2025); 1st: £38,655

Woodcote Stakes
2026
Hickory Lad	Alpe d'Huez	Rlasthope

Previous years
2025
Maximized	Havana Hurricane	Raakeb
2024
Teej A	Megalithic	Tanager
2023
Bobsleigh	Balon D'or	Haatem
2022
Legend Of Xanadu	Self Praise	Commander Straker
2021
Oscula	Flaming Rib	Maybury

2020-2011
2020
Twaasol	Modern News	Mutazawwed
2019
Pinatubo	Oh Purple Reign	Misty Grey
2018
Cosmic Law	Usain Boat	Mendoza
2017
De Bruyne Horse	Cardsharp	Zap
2016
Legendary Lunch	Danielsflyer	Sea Of Snow
2015
Buratino	Nelspruit	Just Emma
2014
Baitha Alga	Ballymore Castle	Red Icon
2013
Thunder Strike	Riverboat Springs	Haikbidiac
2012
Chilworth Icon	Heavy Metal	Liber
2011
Fulbright	Evervescent	On The Dark Side

2010-2001
2010
High Award	Dubawi Gold	Premier Clarets
2009
Corporal Maddox	Walkingonthemoon	Red Avalanche
2008
Smokey Storm	Indian Art	Able Master
2007
Declaration Of War	Bespoke Boy	Mount Pleasure
2006
Sadeek	Going Straight	Always Fruitful
2005
Ba Foxtrot	King Malachi	Green Pride
2004
Screwdriver	Royal Island	Gortumblo
2003
Parkview Love	Cedarberg	Cape Fear
2002
The Bonus King	Monsieur Boulanger	One Last Time
2001
Whitbarrow	Dark Sorcerer	Resplendent Cee

2000-1991
2000
Atmospheric	Stregone	Triple Blue
1999
Gorecki	Bee Eight	Our Ambition
1998
Lady Angharad	Atlantic Destiny	Strike A Blow
1997
Dance Trick	Another Fantasy	Flaming Ember
1996
Proud Native	Premier Bay	Caviar Royale
1995
Gothenberg	World Premier	Double Point
1994
Silca Blanka	Shamanic	Dreamer
1993
Moccasin Run	Queenbird	Chickawicka
1992
Green's Bid	Ihtiraz	Night Melody
1991
Showbrook	Diamond Mine	Forest Fairy

1990-1988
1990
Sylva Honda	Level Xing	Capital Bond
1989
Champagne Gold	Across The Bay	State Of Affairs
1988
Sno Serenade	Sylvan Tempest	Denham Green

The Woodcote Stakes is a conditions flat horse race in Great Britain open to two-year-old Thoroughbreds. It is run over a distance of 6 furlongs and 3 yards (1,210 metres) at Epsom Downs in late May or early June.

== History ==
The Woodcote Stakes, initially spelled Woodcot, was first run in 1794. It was run over the last half-mile of Epsom Downs Racecourse. Colts carried 8 st, with fillies carrying 7 st 1 lb.

The race was not run between 1800 and 1806, but was re-established in 1807 and run over the last six furlongs of Epsom track. Colts carried 8 st 3 lb, with fillies carrying 8 st 0 lb. The following year the race was reduced in distance to half a mile and the weights the horses carried increased by two pounds. The weights rose by a further pound in 1812. In 1839 the race was moved to the new two-year-old course and the distance was increased to six furlongs. In 1842 the subscription fee was set at 15 sov. The weights were also changes, with horses carrying one pound less and the winner of the Two-year-old Stakes at Gorhambury carrying a five-pound penalty. In 1844 the subscription was reduced to 10 sov. In 1847 the weights were returned to what they were before 1842 and the penalty was removed.

Winners of the race have included Leamington, Cremorne, Surefoot, Ladas, Sceptre, The Tetrarch, My Babu and My Swallow.

The Woodcote Stakes held Listed status prior to 2017 when it was downgraded, and is currently sponsored by Betfred.

== Winners 1794-1799 ==
Year	Winner	Owner	Ref.
1794	Dungannon filly	Mr. Rutter
1795	Certhia	3rd Earl of Egremont
1796	Alexander filly	1st Earl Grosvenor
1797	Sister to Colibri	3rd Earl of Egremont
1798	Dungannon colt	Mr. Harris
1799	Jack-a-Lantern	Mr. Dawson

== Winners 1807-1852 ==
Year	Winner	Jockey	Trainer	Owner	Time	Ref.
1807	Marybella			Mr. Lake
1808	Miss Seedling			Mr. Emden
1809	Mr. Edward			Mr. Ladbroke
1810	Hamlet			Mr. Ladbroke
1811	Flash			Viscount Lowther
1812	Harriet			Mr. Ladbroke
1813	Cashunut			Mr. Northey
1814	Hippodamia			Mr. Morland
1815	Rivulet			Gen. L. Gower
1816	Dick Andrews colt			Viscount Lowther
1817	Jeremy Gradus			Mr. Lake
1818	Funny			Mr. Lake
1819	Lady-foot			T. Sadler
1820	Hedley colt			Mr. Rush
1821	Juniper colt			3rd Earl of Warwick
1822	Triumph			T. Sadler
1823	Miss Jigg	Sam Day		Mr. Forth
1824	Scandal	Will Wheatley		J. Rogers
1825	Interpreter colt	George Dockeray		Mr. Walker
1826	Translation	Harry Edwards		Mr. Forth
1827	Brocard	Harry Edwards		Mr. Bartley
1828	Sheperdess	Tommy Lye		General Grosvenor
1829	Acis	George Dockeray		Mr. Young
1830	Partisan filly	Will Wheatley		Mr. Rogers
1831	Whimsey	Will Wheatley		Viscount Lowther
1832	Young Rapid	Arthur Pavis		Colonel Peel
1833	Ophelia	Arthur Pavis		Mr. Yates
1834	Bracelet	Sam Darling		Mr. Ricardo
1835	Swallow	Nat Flatman		Mr. Mills
1836	Arrow	Mann		Captain Williamson
1837	Hawker filly	Arthur Pavis		5th Duke of Rutland
1838	Peon	Sam Rogers		J. Rogers
1839	Iris	Edward Edwards		4th Earl of Albemarle
1840	Palæmon	Nat Flatman		Mr. Greville
	no race 1841
1842	Gipsey Queen	Sly		G. Ongley
1843	Delapre	Whitehouse		4th Earl of Albemarle
1844	Full Sail	Whitehouse		Mr. Edwards
1845	Cherokee	Nat Flatman		Lord George Bentinck
1846	Miles's Boy	Edward Edwards		E. R. Clarke
1847	Flatcatcher	Edward Edwards		B. Green	1:17
1848	Glauca	Nat Flatman		Mr. Payne	1:15
1849	Countess	Kitchener		Mr. Gratwicke	1:22
1850	Marlborough Buck	Whitehouse		Mr. Clarke	1:15
1851	Elcot	Whitehouse		J. Clarke	1:18
1852	Orestes	Sim Templeman		Mr. Oldacre	1:19

== Winners since 1900 ==
Year	Winner	Jockey	Trainer	Owner	Time
1900	Toddington	Sam Loates	Charles Morton		1:13.00
1901	Sceptre	Sam Loates	Charles Morton	Bob Sievier	1:10.60
1902	Rock Sand	Danny Maher	George Blackwell	Sir James Miller	1:12.60
1903
1904	Cicero	Danny Maher	Percy Peck
1905	Sereneta	Herbert Randall	Wright
1906	Traquair	Danny Maher	Percy Peck		1:11.00
1907	White Eagle	Barry Lynham	Jack Robinson		1:10.40
1908	Perola	Danny Maher	George Blackwell
1909	Vargo	Frank Wootton	Richard Wootton		1:10.80
1910	Seaforth	Herbert Randall	Atty Persse		1:10.40
1911	White Star	George Stern	Charles Morton
1912	Shogun	Frank Wootton	Richard Wootton		1:09.80
1913	The Tetrarch	Steve Donoghue	Atty Persse		1:07.60
1914	Cattistock	Jim Clark	Davies
1915-18	no race
1919	Poltava	Fred Slade	Percy Linton		1:09.40
1920	Humorist	Steve Donoghue	Charles Morton		1:10.60
1921	Reecho	Arthur Balding	Peter Gilpin		1:10.20
1922	Duncan Gray	Freddie Fox	Basil Jarvis		1:09.20
1923	Tippler	Joe Childs	John Watson		1:11.60
1924	Iron Mask	Bobby Jones	Harry Cottrill		1:14.00
1925	Jessel	Harry Wragg	Walter Earl		1:10.00
1926	Birthright	Steve Donoghue	Harry Cottrill		1:09.40
1927	Rose Willow colt	Jack Leach	Harry Cottrill		1:10.00
1928	Osiris	Bobby Jones	Basil Jarvis		1:10.80
1929	Lady Abbess	Harry Wragg	Felix Leach		1:10.40
1930	Arthos	Harry Beasley Jr.	Atty Persse		1:11.00
1931	Dastur	Michael Beary	Richard Dawson		1:10.60
1932	Montrose	Sir Gordon Richards	Fred Darling		1:14.40
1933	Old Pretender	George Bezant Jr.	Fred Pratt	J A de Rothschild	1:11.00
1934	Bagman	Cecil Ray	Richard Dawson	Vicomte de Fontarce	1:11.00
1935	Lady Abbess filly	Harry Wragg	Ossie Bell	Sir H Cunliffe-Owen	1:10.00
1936	Hartington	Rufus Beasley	Cecil Boyd-Rochfort	Mrs J Corrigan	1:10.80
1937	Caerloptic	Tommy Weston	Harry Cottrill	Sir A Bailey	1:11.40
1938	Quateroon	Bernard Carslake	George Lambton	Major D McCalmont	1:10.60
1939	Tant Mieux	Sir Gordon Richards	Fred Darling	P Beatty	1:10.40
1940-45	no race
1946	Bhishma	Edgar Britt	Sam Armstrong	H H Maharaja Gaekwar of Baroda	1:13.00
1947	Lerins	Edgar Britt	Sam Armstrong	H H Maharaja Gaekwar of Baroda	1:10.00
1948	River Tay	Charlie Smirke	Henri Jelliss	Dorothy Paget	1:11.40
1949	Full Dress	Eph Smith	Jack Watts	Jim Joel	1:10.80
1950	Crocodile	Stan Smith	Atty Persse	J Olding	1:09.00
1951	Fairforall	Billy Cook	Walter Nightingall	C R Harper	1:10.20
1952	Candaules	Edgar Britt	Charles Elsey	Phil Bull	1:10.20
1953	Blue Prince II	Harry Carr	Cecil Boyd-Rochfort	W M Jefford	1:10.80
1954	Royal Palm	Willie Snaith	Sam Armstrong	J S Gerber	1:10.00
1955	Idle Rocks	Doug Smith	Geoffrey Brooke	David Robinson	1:09.40
1956	Mansbridge	Lester Piggott	Noel Murless	Colonel B Hornung	1:10.20
1957	Mr Snake	Harry Carr	Cecil Boyd-Rochfort	Sir Humphrey de Trafford	1:09.80
1958	Loyal Lady	Johnny Longden	Tommy Carey	Louis E Wolfson	1:11.80
1959	Tulyartos	Jimmy Eddery	Seamus McGrath	Jos McGrath	1:08.90
1960	Morning Star	Doug Smith	Geoffrey Brooke	J O Hambro	1:11.00
1961	Xerxes	Doug Smith	Geoffrey Brooke	Mrs D McCalmont	1:08.60
1962	Tierra Del Fuego	Harry Carr	Humphrey Cottrill	Stanhope Joel	1:08.60
1963	Gentle Art	Ron Hutchinson	Jack Jarvis	Sir Adrian Jarvis	1:12.00
1964	Presto	Joe Mercer	Peter Ashworth	Edward B Benjamin	1:13.65
1965	Visp	Jimmy Lindley	Jack Watts	Edward B Benjamin	1:11.60
1966	Bunratty Castle	Ron Hutchinson	John Dunlop	Lady Sarah FitzAlan-Howard	1:11.27
1967	Last Shoe	Jock Wilson	Brian Swift	A Leader	1:11.49
1968	Silverware	Lester Piggott	Fulke Johnson Houghton	Clifford Nicholson	1:11.98
1969	Sayes	Sandy Barclay	Sam Armstrong	E B Condon	1:11.30
1970	My Swallow	Lester Piggott	Paul Davey	David Robinson	1:09.14
1971	Shoolerville	Jimmy Lindley	Sam Armstrong	Mrs John F C Bryce	1:10.34
1972	Captive Dream	Bill Williamson	Paul Davey	David Robinson	1:10.49
1973	Maestro Please	Richard Marshall	Bill Marshall	G van der Ploeg	1:09.81
1974	Mendip Man	Geoff Lewis	Clive Brittain	Mrs B Davis	1:10.82
1975	Chum-Chum	Joe Mercer	Ron Smyth	C Gaventa	1:10.51
1976	Mr Nice Guy	Lester Piggott	Eddie Reavey	Mrs F Todd	1:11.29
1977	Royal Pinacle	Ernie Johnson	Barry Hills	Mrs V Ketteley	1:11.96
1978	Pessu	Pat Eddery	Bill Marshall	C Gaventa	1:10.20
1979	Why Not	Joe Mercer	Henry Cecil	Daniel Wildenstein	1:11.78
1980	Redden	Kipper Lynch	Brian Swift	P. Wetzel	1:10.11
1981	Chris's Lad	Joe Mercer	Arthur Goodwill	Michael Mouskos	1:11.45
1982	Stay Sharp	Steve Cauthen	Paul Kelleway	R. Whalley	1:11.45
1983	Any Business	Philip Waldron	Geoff Lewis	Mrs G. Lewis	1:13.99
1984	Pennine Walk	Pat Eddery	Jeremy Tree	Stavros Niarchos	1:11.52
1986	Mr Eats	Cash Asmussen	Paul Kelleway		1:10.87
1987	Cotton Auction	Steve Cauthen	John Edwards		1:09.14
1988	Sno Serenade	Michael Roberts	Ron Boss	Judi Gold	1:09.46
1989	Champagne Gold	Willie Carson	Denys Smith	Claire Massey	1:10.88
1990	Sylva Honda	Michael Roberts	Clive Brittain	E. A. Grimstead & Son Honda	1:11.17
1991	Showbrook	Bruce Raymond	Richard Hannon Sr.	A.F. Budge	1:07.85
1992	Green's Bid	Richard Quinn	Paul Cole	Richard Green	1:10.64
1993	Moccasin Run	Frankie Dettori	Ian Balding	George Strawbridge	1:09.92
1994	Silca Blanka	Pat Eddery	Mick Channon	Aldridge Racing	1:08.87
1995	Gothenberg	Darryll Holland	Mark Johnston	Brian Yeardley Continental	1:09.38
1996	Proud Native	Michael Kinane	Alan Jarvis	L. Fust	1:10.19
1997	Dance Trick	John Reid	Peter Chapple-Hyam	Robert Sangster	1:09.68
1998	Lady Angharad	Michael Kinane	Alan Jarvis	Ambrose Turnbull	1:10.74
1999	Gorecki	Michael Kinane	Neville Callaghan	Michael Tabor	1:13.18
2000	Atmospheric	Jimmy Fortune	Paul Cole	Highclere Thoroughbred Racing	1:11.13
2001	Whitbarrow	Basil Marcus	Rod Millman	Seasons Holidays	1:09.30
2002	The Bonus King	Kevin Darley	Mark Johnston	Mo Done	1:12.71
2003	Parkview Love	Kevin Darley	Mark Johnston	C Nicholson	1:09.13
2004	Screwdriver	Richard Hughes	Richard Hannon Sr.	Raymond Tooth	1:10.03
2005	Ba Foxtrot	Chris Catlin	Mick Channon	The Highlife Racing Club	1:10.96
2006	Sadeek	Neil Callan	Kevin Ryan	John Browne	1:10.49
2007	Declaration Of War	Robert Havlin	Peter Chapple-Hyam	Violet Mercer	1:10.45
2008	Smokey Storm	Alan Munro	William Jarvis	The Bk Partnership	1:11.06
2009	Corporal Maddox	Jim Crowley	Karl Burke	Mogeely Stud & Maura Gittins	1:09.39
2010	High Award	Johnny Murtagh	Tommy Stack	Tabor, Smith & Magnier	1:09.23
2011	Fulbright	Silvestre de Sousa	Mark Johnston	Sheikh Hamdan Al Maktoum	1:09.44
2012	Chilworth Icon	Martin Harley	Mick Channon	7Rus	1:08.43
2013	Thunder Strike	Richard Hughes	Richard Hannon Sr.	M S Al Shahi	1:11.26
2014	Baitha Alga	Frankie Dettori	Richard Hannon Jr.	Al Shaqab Racing	1:09.63
2015	Buratino	William Buick	Mark Johnston	Hamdan al Maktoum	1:08.82
2016	Legendary Lunch	Pat Dobbs	Richard Hannon Jr.	Rat Pack Partnership 2016	1:13.55
2017	Cardsharp (Note: De Bruyne Horse finished first in 2017 but was subsequently disqualified after testing positive for a banned substance)	Silvestre de Sousa	Mark Johnston	Hamdan bin Mohammed Al Maktoum	1:08.54
2018	Cosmic Law	P. J. McDonald	Richard Fahey	John Dance	1:11.95
2019	Pinatubo	James Doyle	Charlie Appleby	Godolphin	1:09.22
2020 (Note: The 2020 race took place in July due to the COVID-19 pandemic in the United Kingdom)	Twaasol	Martin Harley	Owen Burrows	Sheikh Ahmed Al Maktoum	1:09.73
2021	Oscula	Mark Crehan	George Boughey	Nick Bradley Racing 20 & George Boughey	1:12.02
2022	Legend of Xanadu	William Buick	Mick Channon	Box 41	1:09.01
2023	Bobsleigh	Charles Bishop	Eve Johnson Houghton	The Woodway 20	1:08.99
2024	Teej A	Clifford Lee	Karl Burke	Nick Bradley Racing 5 & E Burke	1:13.44
2025	Maximized	William Buick	Mick Channon	Godolphin	1:11.75
2026	Hickory Lad	Sam James	Phillip Makin	J Toes & J O'Loan	1:11.39

== See also ==
- Horse racing in Great Britain
- List of British flat horse races
