= Wajima (horse) =

American-bred Thoroughbred racehorse

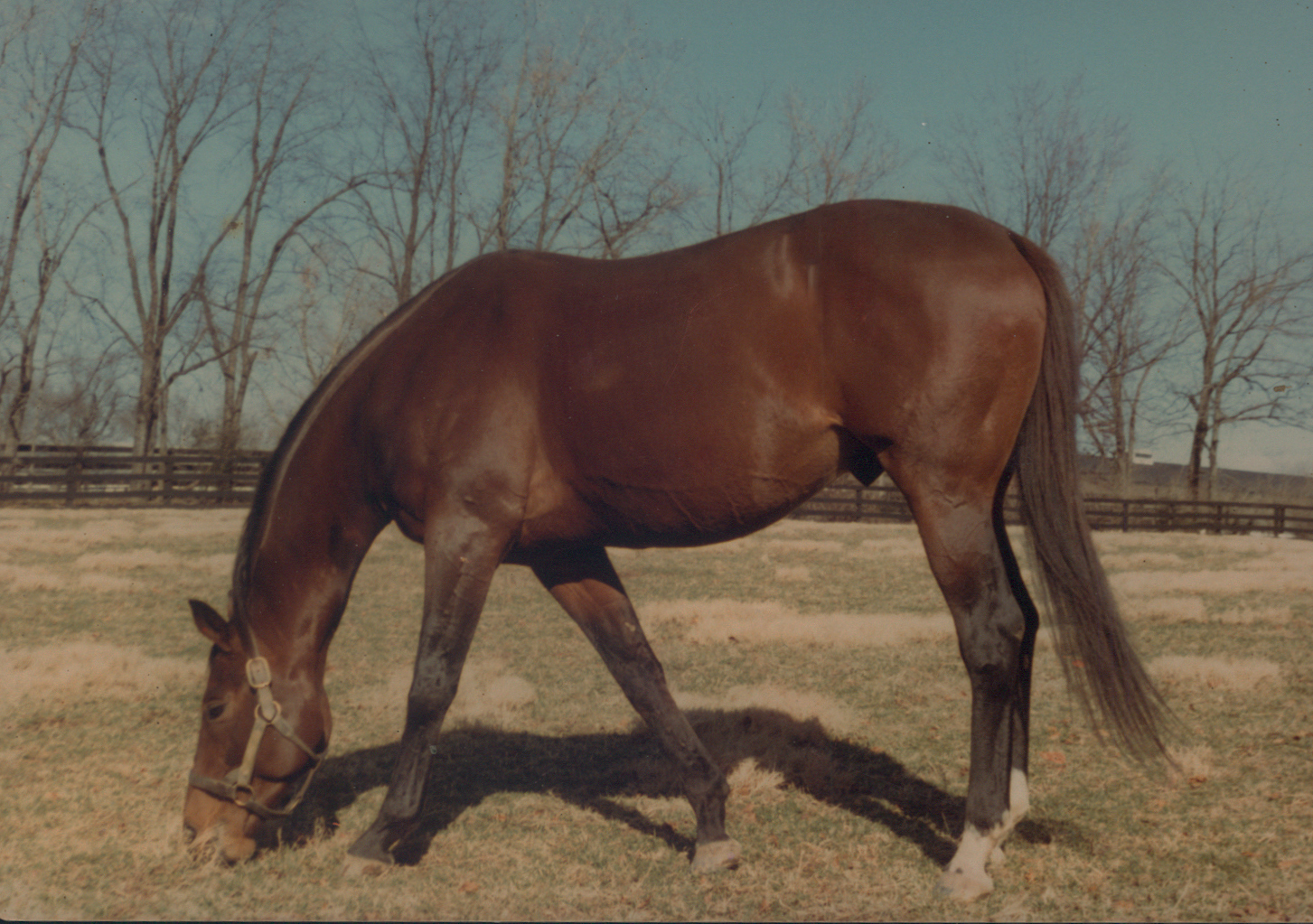
- Wajima at Spendthrift Farm in 1981
- Sire: Bold Ruler
- Grandsire: Nasrullah
- Dam: Iskra
- Damsire: Le Haar
- Sex: Stallion
- Foaled: 1972
- Country: United States
- Colour: Bay
- Breeder: Claiborne Farm
- Owner: East-West Stable
- Trainer: Stephen A. DiMauro
- Record: 16: 9–5–0
- Earnings: US$537,837

Major wins
- Marylander Handicap (1975); Monmouth Handicap (1975); Travers Stakes (1975); Governor Stakes (1975); Marlboro Cup (1975)

Awards
- American Champion Three-Year-Old Male Horse (1975)

Wajima (Mar 8, 1972 – August 27, 2001) was an American Champion Thoroughbred racehorse.

== Background ==
Wajima was bred by Bull Hancock's renowned Claiborne Farm of Paris, Kentucky. He was out of the French mare Iskra, a daughter of Le Haar, the Leading sire in France in 1963. Wajima was a son of one of America's greatest sires, Bold Ruler. Sold as a yearling for a then-record $600,000 ($4.2 million inflation adjusted), he was purchased by a four-man syndicate comprising James Welch of Alexandria, Louisiana, James A. Scully of Lexington, Kentucky, Harold I. Snyder of Dover, Ohio, and leading Japanese breeder Zenya Yoshida. The partners named the colt after Japanese sumo wrestler Wajima Hiroshi. They raced him under their nom de course, East-West Stable.

Wajima was conditioned for racing by trainer Stephen A. DiMauro.

== Racing career ==
=== 1974: two-year-old season ===
Wajima made four starts at age two in 1974, winning twice. His best result in an important stakes race was a second to L'Enjoleur in track record time in the November 3rd running of the Grade 1 Laurel Futurity.

=== 1975: three-year-old season ===
As a three-year-old in 1975, Wajima suffered leg problems at the beginning of the year and did not run in the U.S. Triple Crown series. He made his first start in June, finishing second in both the Saranac Stakes and the Dwyer Handicap. He got his first stakes race win on July 19, 1975, setting a track record for a mile and an eighth in winning the Marylander Handicap at Bowie Race Track. Wajima then won four more important stakes races in a row, next taking the Monmouth Handicap and the Travers Stakes. He next defeated that year's Kentucky Derby winner, Foolish Pleasure, plus the 1974 American Horse of the Year, Forego, and future Hall of Fame inductee Ancient Title to win the Governor Stakes at Belmont Park. In the most important race of his career, on September 13 Wajima defeated Forego again in winning the 1 1/4-mile Marlboro Cup at Belmont Park, which prompted a New York Times article titled Wajima Now Rated A $600,000 Bargain.

In late September 1975, Wajima was syndicated for a world-record price of $7.2 million ($42.1 million inflation adjusted). Organized by Leslie Combs II, the syndicate was made up of 36 shares of $200,000 each with the four members of the East-West Stables retaining 21 of the 36 shares. Other share purchasers in the syndicate included prominent American and international breeders such as Cardiff Stud Farm, John C. Mabee, Aaron U. Jones, George R. Gardiner, Robert Sangster, and Bertram & Diana Firestone.

After he finished second in the September 27, 1975, Woodward Stakes and in the October 25 Jockey Club Gold Cup, in early November Wajima's owners announced his retirement from racing. At year's end, he was voted the Eclipse Award as the 1975 American Champion Three-Year-Old Male Horse.

== Stud record ==
Wajima was sent to stand at stud at Leslie Combs II's Spendthrift Farm in Lexington, Kentucky. His progeny met with modest racing success. From his seventeen crops, he sired twenty-six stakes winners, including four graded winners, the best of which was Key to the Moon, a winner of the Queen's Plate in Canada and stakes races in the United States, who was voted the 1984 Canadian Champion Three-Year-Old Male Horse.

In 1987, Wajima was moved to Stone Farm in Paris, Kentucky, where he was pensioned in 1992. He died on August 27, 2001, of old age and was buried at Stone Farm.

== Pedigree ==
Pedigree of Wajima
Sire Bold Ruler (USA) 1954	Nasrullah (GB); 1940	Nearco	Pharos
Sire Bold Ruler (USA) 1954	Nasrullah (GB); 1940	Nearco	Nogara
Sire Bold Ruler (USA) 1954	Nasrullah (GB); 1940	Mumtaz Begum	Blenheim
Sire Bold Ruler (USA) 1954	Nasrullah (GB); 1940	Mumtaz Begum	Mumtaz Mahal
Sire Bold Ruler (USA) 1954	Miss Disco (USA); 1944	Discovery	Display
Sire Bold Ruler (USA) 1954	Miss Disco (USA); 1944	Discovery	Ariadne
Sire Bold Ruler (USA) 1954	Miss Disco (USA); 1944	Outdone	Pompey
Sire Bold Ruler (USA) 1954	Miss Disco (USA); 1944	Outdone	Sweep Out
Dam Iskra (FR) 1961	Le Haar (FR); 1954	Vieux Manoir	Brantome
Dam Iskra (FR) 1961	Le Haar (FR); 1954	Vieux Manoir	Vieille Maison
Dam Iskra (FR) 1961	Le Haar (FR); 1954	Mince Pie	Teleferique
Dam Iskra (FR) 1961	Le Haar (FR); 1954	Mince Pie	Cannelle
Dam Iskra (FR) 1961	Fasciola (FR); 1946	Fastnet	Pharos
Dam Iskra (FR) 1961	Fasciola (FR); 1946	Fastnet	Tatoule
Dam Iskra (FR) 1961	Fasciola (FR); 1946	Foxcraft	Foxhunter
Dam Iskra (FR) 1961	Fasciola (FR); 1946	Foxcraft	Philomene

Records
Preceded by Crowned Prince	Most expensive Thoroughbred colt yearling July 1973 – July 1974	Next: Kentucky Gold
