= Arctic Cosmos =

American-bred Thoroughbred racehorse

- Sire: North Light
- Grandsire: Danehill
- Dam: Fifth Avenue Doll
- Damsire: Marquetry
- Sex: Stallion
- Foaled: 31 January 2007
- Country: USA
- Colour: Bay
- Breeder: Sheridan & Iadora Farm
- Owner: Rachel Hood & Robin Geffen
- Trainer: John Gosden
- Record: 14: 4-2-2
- Earnings: £413,376

Major wins
- St. Leger Stakes (2010); Magnolia Stakes (2012)

Arctic Cosmos (foaled 31 January 2007) is an American-bred, British-trained racehorse and sire best known as the winner of the 2010 St. Leger Stakes.

== Background ==
Arctic Cosmos is a bay horse with a small white star bred in Kentucky by Sheridan & Iadora Farm. He was from the first crop of foals sired by the 2004 Epsom Derby winner North Light.

As a yearling, Arctic Cosmos was bought for 47,000 guineas at Tattersalls Blandford Bloodstock and John Gosden for his wife Rachel Hood.

== Racing career ==
=== 2009: two-year-old season ===
As a two-year-old, ran twice, finishing fourth in maiden races at Kempton Park and Redcar Racecourse in October.

=== 2010: three-year-old season ===
Arctic Cosmos began his second season by winning a maiden on the Tapeta surface at Wolverhampton Racecourse. He then ran in handicap races, finishing third at Newbury in May before winning over one and half miles at Kempton in June. He was then moved up sharply in class for the Group Two King Edward VII Stakes at Royal Ascot in June in which he started a 14/1 outsider and finished second to Monterosso, with Buzzword (German Derby), At First Sight (runner-up in The Derby), Green Moon and Bullet Train (Lingfield Derby Trial) among the other beaten horses. The colt then finished third behind Rebel Soldier and Dandino in the Gordon Stakes at Goodwood Racecourse.

At Doncaster Racecourse On 11 September 2010, Arctic Cosmos started at odds of 12/1 for the 234th running of the St Leger Stakes. The field also included Rewilding, Snow Fairy, Dandino, Joshua Tree and the Irish Derby runner-up Midas Touch. Ridden by William Buick, Arctic Cosmos tracked the leaders before taking the lead approaching the final furlong and stayed on well to win by one and three quarter lengths from Midas Touch, with the 40/1 outsider Corsica in third place. The colt sustained a serious leg injury when being prepared for the Canadian International Stakes and was off the course for over a year.

=== Later career ===
Arctic Cosmos finally returned for two races in October 2011, finishing second to Quest For Peace (to whom he was conceding seven pounds) in the Cumberland Lodge Stakes at Ascot and then finishing fourth of sixteen to the French-trained filly Sarah Lynx in the Canadian International. The horse began his five-year-old season with a six length win in the Magnolia Stakes over ten furlongs at Kempton in 2012. His three subsequent races were extremely disappointing as he finished last in the John Porter Stakes, the Yorkshire Cup and the Godolphin Stakes.

== Stud record ==
Arctic Cosmos was retired from racing to become a breeding stallion at the Old Road Stud in County Waterford at fee of €1,500.

== Pedigree ==
Pedigree of Arctic Cosmos (USA), bay stallion, 2007
Sire North Light (IRE) 2001	Danehill (USA); 1986	Danzig	Northern Dancer
Sire North Light (IRE) 2001	Danehill (USA); 1986	Danzig	Pas de Nom
Sire North Light (IRE) 2001	Danehill (USA); 1986	Razyana	His Majesty
Sire North Light (IRE) 2001	Danehill (USA); 1986	Razyana	Spring Adieu
Sire North Light (IRE) 2001	Sought Out (IRE); 1988	Rainbow Quest	Blushing Groom
Sire North Light (IRE) 2001	Sought Out (IRE); 1988	Rainbow Quest	I Will Follow
Sire North Light (IRE) 2001	Sought Out (IRE); 1988	Edinburgh	Charlottown
Sire North Light (IRE) 2001	Sought Out (IRE); 1988	Edinburgh	Queen's Castle
Dam Fifth Avenue Doll (USA) 1998	Marquetry (USA); 1987	Conquistador Cielo	Mr. Prospector
Dam Fifth Avenue Doll (USA) 1998	Marquetry (USA); 1987	Conquistador Cielo	K D Princess
Dam Fifth Avenue Doll (USA) 1998	Marquetry (USA); 1987	Regent's Walk	Vice Regent
Dam Fifth Avenue Doll (USA) 1998	Marquetry (USA); 1987	Regent's Walk	Lover's Walk
Dam Fifth Avenue Doll (USA) 1998	Allego (USA); 1985	Alleged	Hoist The Flag
Dam Fifth Avenue Doll (USA) 1998	Allego (USA); 1985	Alleged	Princess Pout
Dam Fifth Avenue Doll (USA) 1998	Allego (USA); 1985	Dotsie Go	Clandestine
Dam Fifth Avenue Doll (USA) 1998	Allego (USA); 1985	Dotsie Go	Gay Rose (Family 1-n)
