= Blandford Bloodstock =

Horse racing bloodstock agency

Blandford Bloodstock is one of the leading horse racing bloodstock agencies in Europe. In 2008, they purchased the St. Leger Stakes winner Arctic Cosmos and the Prix Morny (Gr 1) winner Dream Ahead

Blandford Bloodstock is based in Newmarket, Suffolk, and has three Bloodstock Agents: Tom Goff, Richard Brown and Stuart Boman., and was founded in 2002 by Joss Collins and Tom Goff.
