= Reine Enchanteur =

American-bred Thoroughbred racehorse

- Sire: Sea Bird
- Grandsire: Dan Cupid
- Dam: Libra
- Damsire: Hyperion
- Sex: Mare
- Foaled: 1967
- Owner: Wendell P. Rosso
- Earnings: $9,305

Reine Enchanteur (f. 1967) was a Thoroughbred racehorse out of Sea Bird who was sold for a world-record $405,000 ($3.7 million inflation adjusted) in 1968.

She earned a total career purse of $9,305. Owner Wendell P. Rosso used her for breeding, including with 1971 Blue Grass Stakes winner Impetuosity.

Records
Preceded by Majestic Prince	Most expensive Thoroughbred colt yearling July 1968 – July 1970	Next: Crowned Prince
