= Save Historic Newmarket =

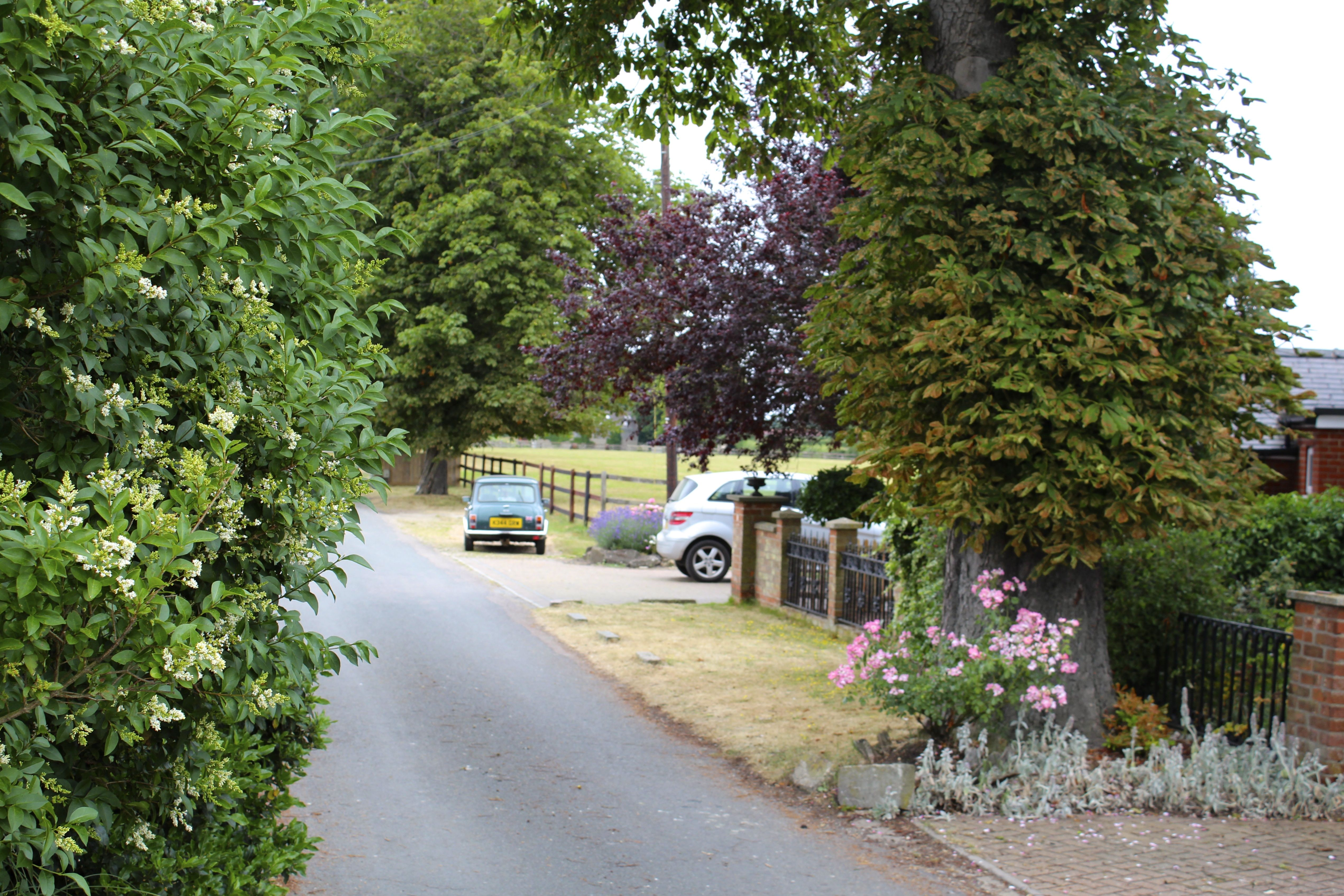
The entrance to Stanley House Stud, also known as Hatchfield Farm in Newmarket, Suffolk, UK

Save Historic Newmarket was a limited company set up by racehorse owners and trainers in Newmarket in 2008 to oppose plans to build houses on land belonging to the Earl of Derby.

== Hatchfield Farm ==
The dispute over the Hatchfield Farm development began in 2008, when there was a public consultation over plans to build 1,200 homes, a new school, shops and offices on the 67 hectare greenfield site that lies between the A14 and A142 Fordham Road, adjacent to Derby's Stanley House stud on the outskirts of Newmarket.

Save Historic Newmarket was incorporated on 6 November 2008 with Rachel Hood, racehorse owner and wife of trainer John Gosden, as its director. Opposition to the development was led by prominent members of the horseracing industry in Newmarket, including the Jockey Club, Tattersalls, and Godolphin racing. Opponents wrote an open letter to Derby, in which they said that the proposal: "is unacceptable and will be the end of Newmarket's illustrious history and tenability as the world's foremost racehorse training centre". Concerns centred around an increase in population and traffic in the town. Speaking to The Daily Telegraph in October 2009, Lord Derby acknowledged the anger of opponents to the development, but said: "I am a stud owner and have my premises and training in Newmarket, and the last thing I would want to do is threaten the racing industry."

A refined planning application was submitted in November 2009. On 2 June 2010, Forest Heath Planning Councillors unanimously rejected Lord Derby's plans on five separate grounds, in the first such local decision following announcement of the abolition of Regional Spatial Strategies by Conservative Communities and Local Government Minister Eric Pickles. The meeting took place at the council's Mildenhall office and was attended by Derby and members of Save Historic Newmarket and their supporters, including Hood, Gosden, Luca and Sara Cumani, Sir Michael Stoute and John McCririck. Matt Hancock, Conservative MP for West Suffolk said: "This decision shows the local council and the new government working together for the people of Newmarket".

Save Historic Newmarket, together with Tattersalls, the Unex Group property developers, the Jockey Club, the Newmarket Trainers' Federation, Godolphin, and Darley Stud, then challenged the district council's planning strategy in the High Court, arguing it was flawed. On 25 March 2011, Mr Justice Collins quashed the planning strategy related to Newmarket. The council was refused leave to appeal. Derby's appeal against the district council's planning refusal proceeded throughout much of summer 2011, with a planning inquiry held at Mildenhall between June and September. On 23 March 2012, the Communities and Local Government Minister Eric Pickles dismissed the appeal.

Derby again applied for planning permission, this time for a smaller development of 400 houses. There were further protests, including one in which the work riders of several trainers wore vests saying "No to Hatchfield Farm". In July 2014, the plans, having previously been rejected by Newmarket Town Council, were approved by Forest Heath District Council by ten votes to five, with one abstention. Days later, the plans were called in by the Secretary of State and, following another inquiry, the decision was reached in October 2016 to overturn the council's approval of the plans. Derby appealed the decision, and it was set aside in the High Court in May 2017. A third inquiry was set up in June 2018. The plans to build 400 homes were finally given approval by Secretary of State Robert Jenrick in April 2020.

== George Lambton Playing Fields ==
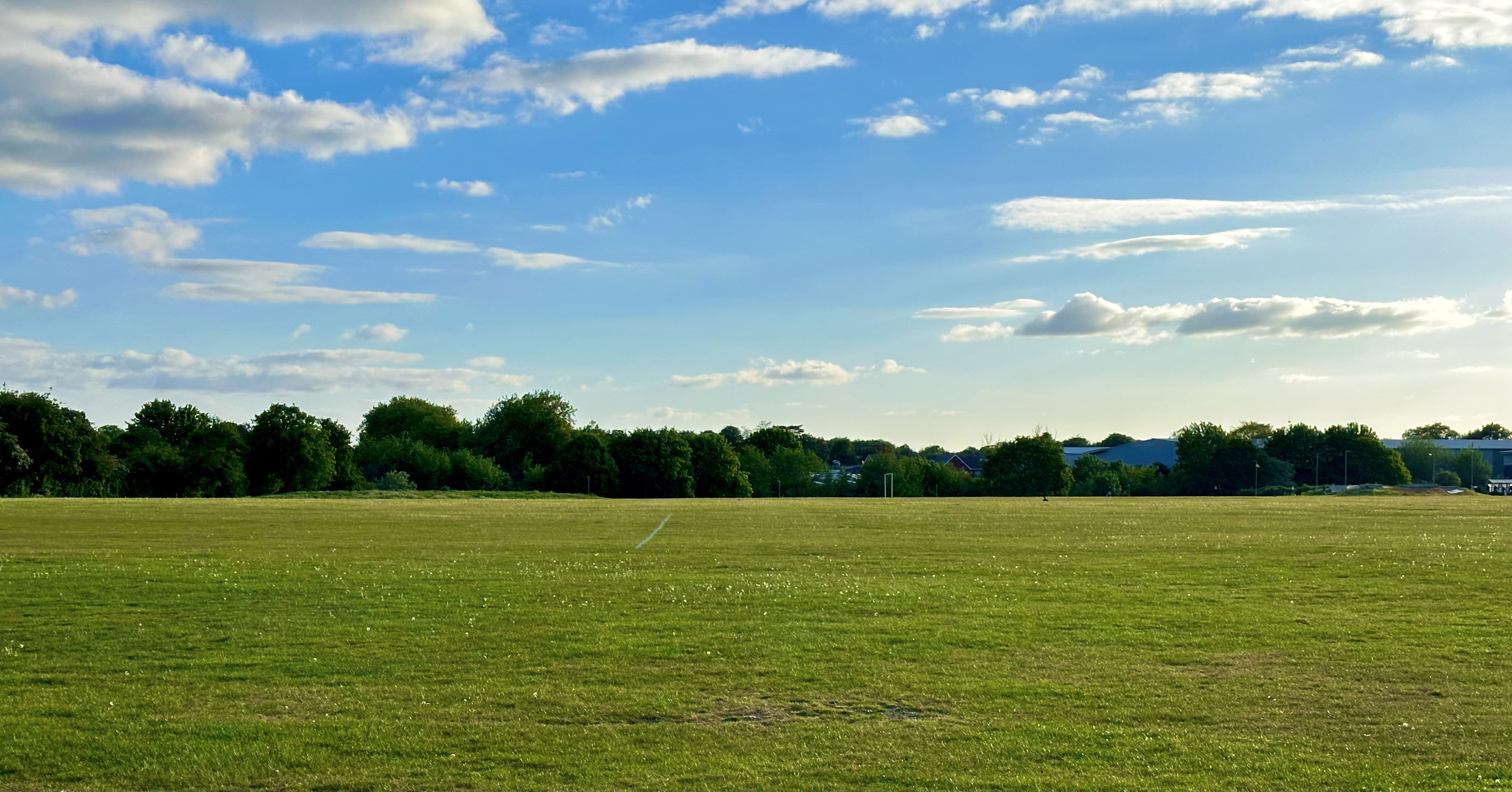
The George Lambton Playing Fields

Save Historic Newmarket has campaigned for the long-term protection of the George Lambton Playing Fields, a sports recreation ground in Newmarket named after the racehorse trainer George Lambton. The fields were leased to the people of Newmarket in 1979 for a term of 100 years, with the lease due to revert to the landowner in 2068.

The organisation described the fields as a core part of the town's community life, citing the absence of any comparable open space elsewhere in Newmarket, and has opposed proposals to redevelop the site for a supermarket.
