= Freemason Lodge Stables =

Racehorse stables in Newmarket

Coordinates: 52.255°N 0.421°E

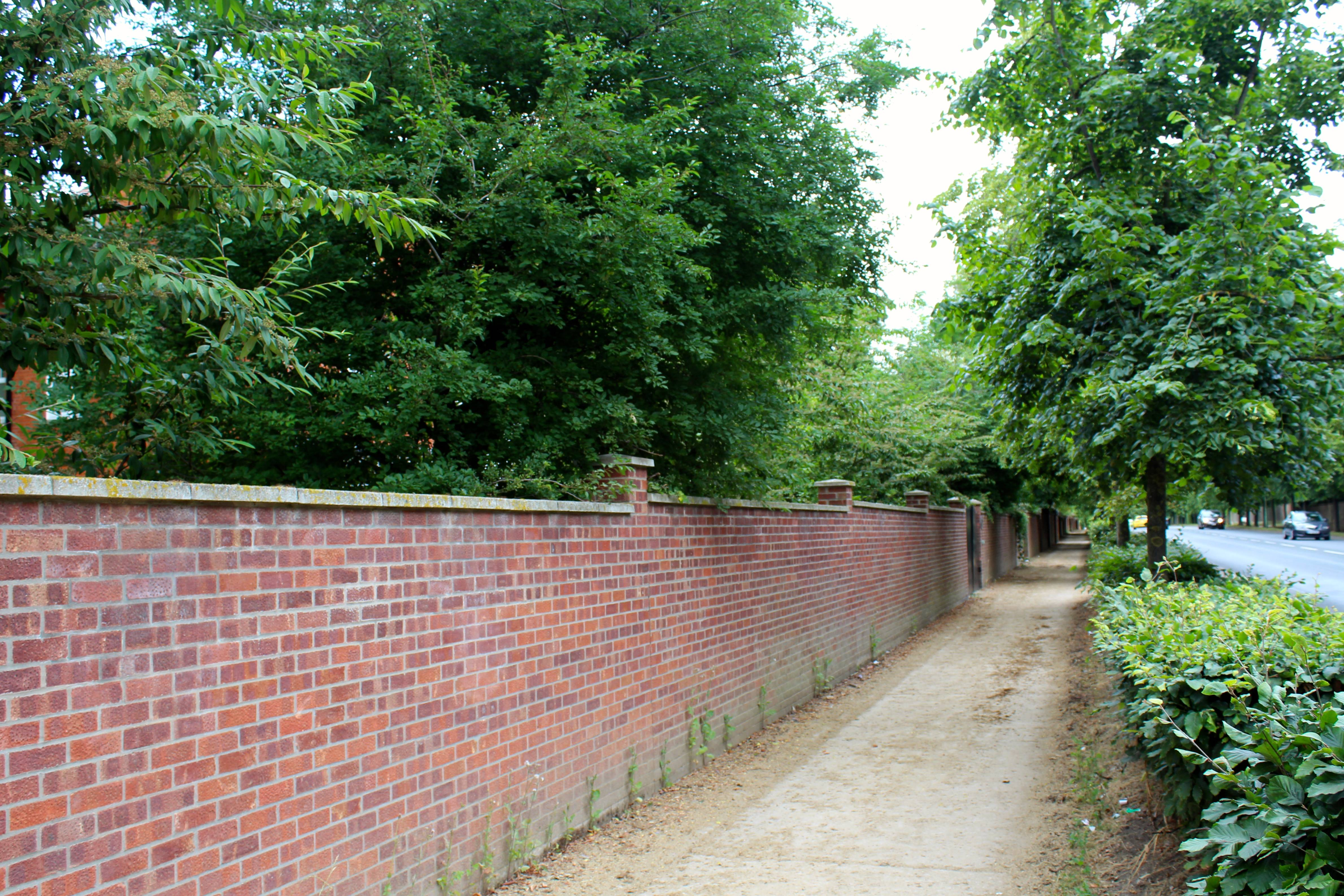
One of the entrances to Freemason Lodge stables from the Bury Road in Newmarket, Suffolk, UK

Freemason Lodge Stables is a racehorse training yard in Newmarket, Suffolk, England. It was the stables of Sir Michael Stoute, a ten-time British flat racing Champion Trainer. From 2025 it will be the base of Raphael Freire, who trains for Kia Joorabchian's Amo Racing organisation.

It is located next to the prestigious Bury Road in Newmarket.
