= Canadian Bound =

American-bred Thoroughbred racehorse

- Sire: Secretariat
- Grandsire: Bold Ruler
- Dam: Charming Alibi
- Damsire: Honey's Alibi
- Sex: Stallion
- Foaled: 29 April 1975
- Country: United States
- Breeder: Nelson Bunker Hunt
- Owner: Ted Burnett & John Sikura, Jr.
- Trainer: Maurice Zilber
- Record: 4: 0–1–0
- Earnings: $1,050 USD

Canadian Bound (April 29, 1975 – 1992) was the first Thoroughbred yearling racehorse ever to be sold for more than 1 million USD. He was part of the first crop of foals born to Secretariat. He proved to be of little use as a racehorse, achieving a single second-place finish in three starts in France and running unplaced in his only race in the United States.

== Background ==
Canadian Bound was bred by Texas oilman Nelson Bunker Hunt. His dam was Charming Alibi, who was also the dam of Hunt's great Hall of Fame filly, Dahlia.

There was a lot of enthusiasm regarding the unnamed colt when he was sent to the 1976 Keeneland July sale and the opening bid of $716,000 broke the previous record set a year prior. The bidding for the yearling broke the $1 million barrier for the first time, and he ended up being sold for $1.5 million ($8.5 million inflation adjusted) to Canadians Ted Burnett and Hill 'n' Dale Farms' John Sikura, Jr. He was sent to race in France with trainer Maurice Zilber.

== Racing career ==
Canadian Bound began racing at two, finishing second on his only start. He finished out of the money in both of his 1978 starts. At age four, he was sent to Hollywood Park Racetrack in California, where in the final race of his career, he finished fourth.

== Stud record ==
Retired to stud, in 1982 Canadian Bound stood at the Stallion Station near Lexington, Kentucky. He was not successful as a sire. He died in 1992.

== Pedigree ==
Pedigree of Canadian Bound (USA), chestnut stallion, 1975
Sire Secretariat (USA) 1970	Bold Ruler (USA); 1954	Nasrullah	Nearco
Sire Secretariat (USA) 1970	Bold Ruler (USA); 1954	Nasrullah	Mumtaz Begum
Sire Secretariat (USA) 1970	Bold Ruler (USA); 1954	Miss Disco	Discovery
Sire Secretariat (USA) 1970	Bold Ruler (USA); 1954	Miss Disco	Outdone
Sire Secretariat (USA) 1970	Somethingroyal (USA); 1952	Princequillo	Prince Rose
Sire Secretariat (USA) 1970	Somethingroyal (USA); 1952	Princequillo	Cosquilla
Sire Secretariat (USA) 1970	Somethingroyal (USA); 1952	Imperatrice	Caruso
Sire Secretariat (USA) 1970	Somethingroyal (USA); 1952	Imperatrice	Cinquepace
Dam Charming Alibi 1963	Honeys Alibi; 1952	Alibhai	Hyperion
Dam Charming Alibi 1963	Honeys Alibi; 1952	Alibhai	Teresina
Dam Charming Alibi 1963	Honeys Alibi; 1952	Honeymoon	Beau Pere
Dam Charming Alibi 1963	Honeys Alibi; 1952	Honeymoon	Panoramic
Dam Charming Alibi 1963	Adorada (ARG); 1947	Hierocles	Abjer
Dam Charming Alibi 1963	Adorada (ARG); 1947	Hierocles	Loika
Dam Charming Alibi 1963	Adorada (ARG); 1947	Gilded Wave	Gallant Fox
Dam Charming Alibi 1963	Adorada (ARG); 1947	Gilded Wave	Ondulation (Family: 13-c)

Records
Preceded by Elegant Prince	Most expensive Thoroughbred colt yearling July 1975 – July 1979	Next: Hoist The King
