= Bury Road =

Road in Newmarket, Suffolk, England

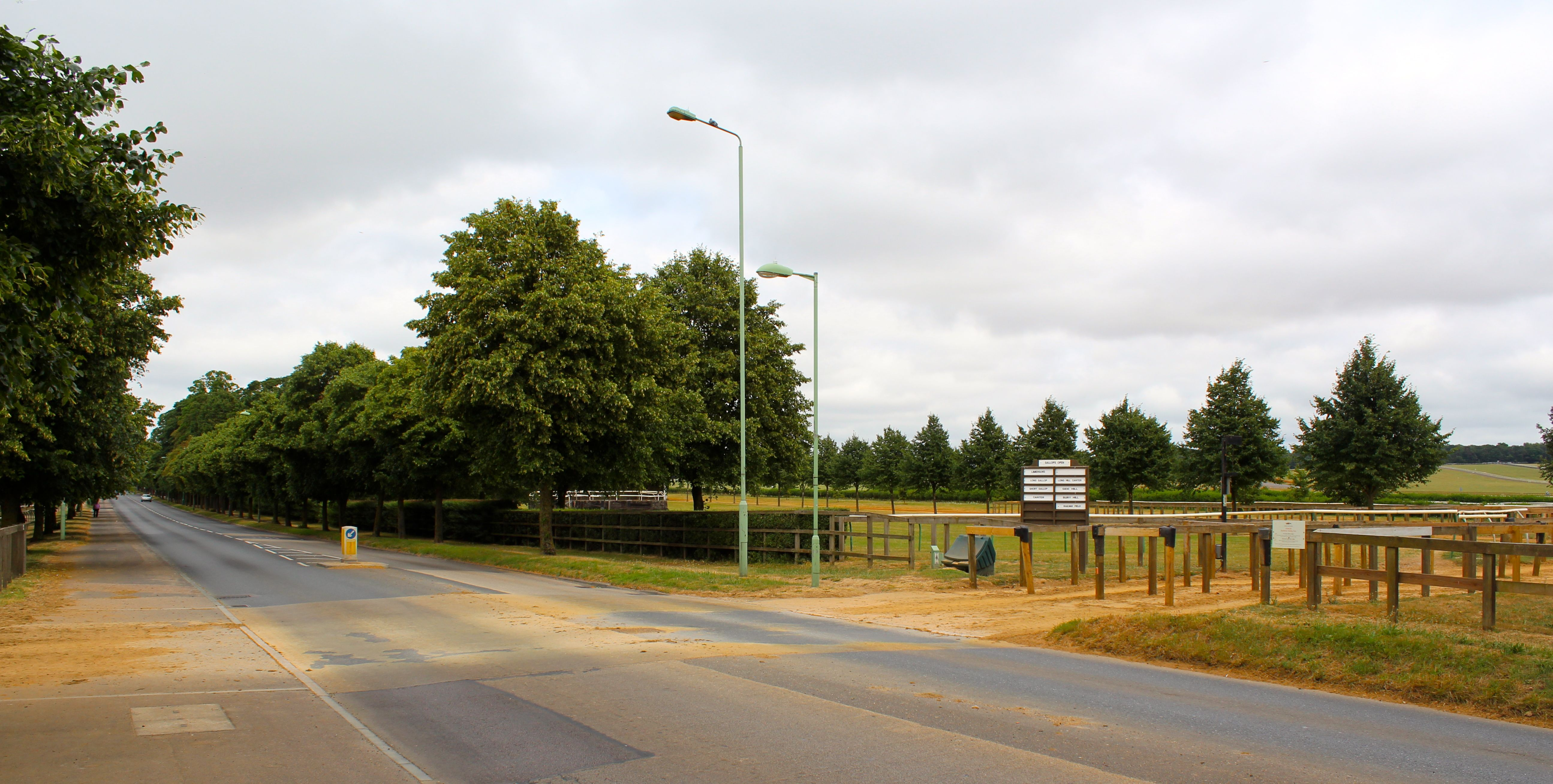
Part of the Bury Road in Newmarket, Suffolk, UK, with part of the Long Hill Gallops in the background

The Bury Road in the horse racing town of Newmarket, Suffolk in England is the road along which a number of major stables were built in the 19th and 20th centuries. It is one of the three main roads along which racing stables have been built, the others being the Fordham Road and Hamilton Road.

Among these stables are Freemason Lodge Stables, home to Sir Michael Stoute, Godolphin Stables and Moulton Paddocks, home to the Godolphin Racing operation, Clarehaven Stables, home to John Gosden, Carlburg Stables, home to Roger Varian.
