= Robin Geffen =

British racehorse owner

- Born: 1957 (age 68–69); London, England
- Spouse: Camilla Geffen
- Children: 2

Robin Geffen is a British financier and classic-winning racehorse owner.

== Early life ==
Geffen was born in London in October 1957. He attended Oxford University, graduating in 1979 from Keble College in Politics, Philosophy and Economics.

== Career ==
Following graduation, Geffen worked for Charterhouse J Rothschild, before moving to Eagle Star to work across European and Asia Pacific funds. He worked for York Plc, Scottish Equitable and CIO before founding his own business, Neptune Investment Management in 2002.

Geffen was CEO for Neptune, but also continued to work across fund management. The firm enjoyed strong early performance and pioneered a move to encourage UK and European investors to allocate assets towards rapidly-evolving emerging markets. Geffen's approach was to promote young fund managers rapidly. Whilst many were not successful others went on to found their own asset management businesses. In the later years of the business concerns were raised about staff turnover, fund performance and family promotions within the organisation. In August 2019, profits declined by 90%, Geffen stepped down as CEO as Neptune Investment Management was acquired by Liontrust for £40million. Geffen remained with Liontrust in a Head of Global Equity role, although the Neptune brand was ultimately dropped.

== Horse racing ==
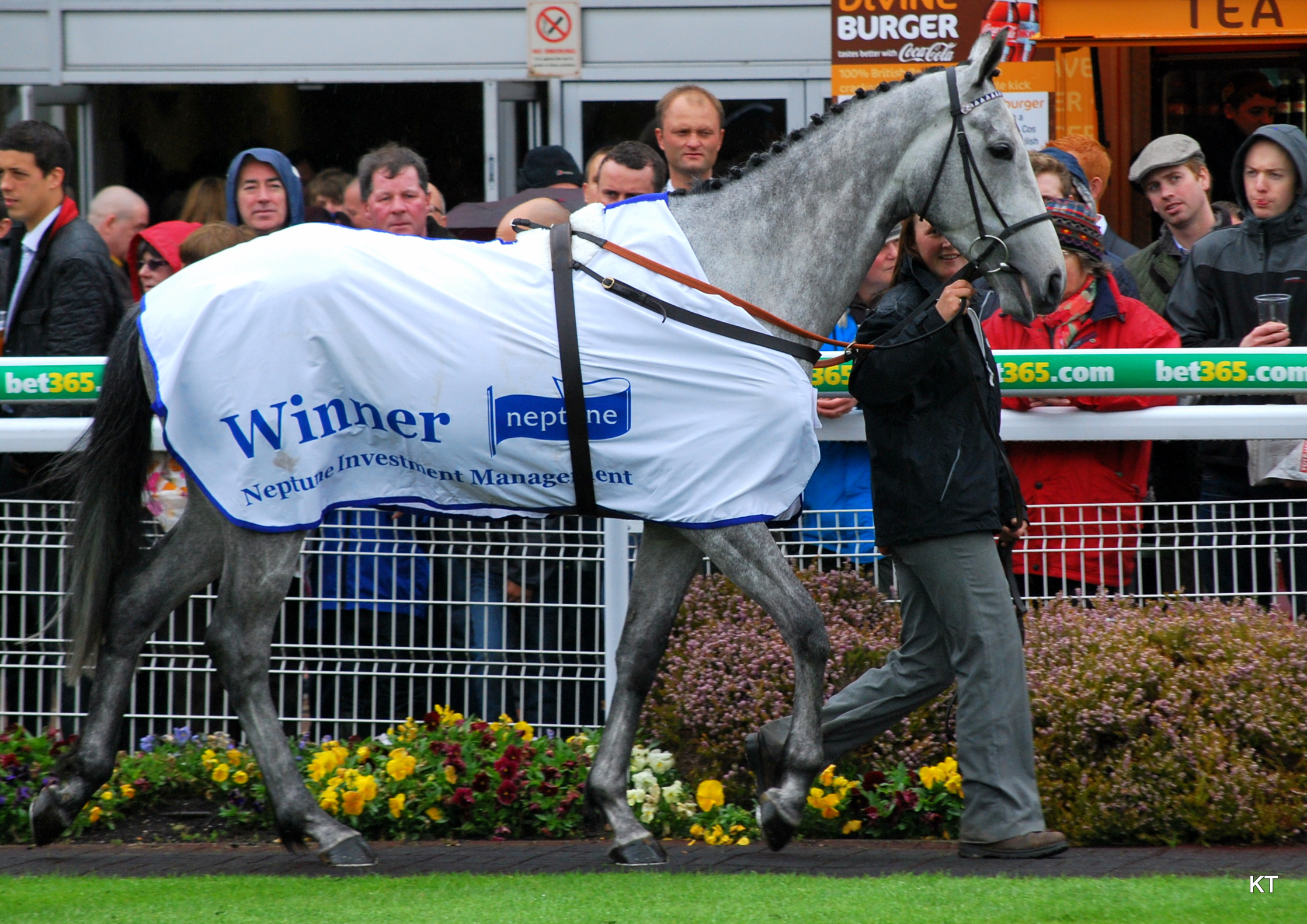
Simonsig, winner of the 2012 Neptune Investment Management Hurdle at the Cheltenham Festival

Geffen's involvement in racing came in the 1990s with ownership through syndicates. In 2010, he became an owner of King Of Wands alongside Rachel Hood, the ROA President. Trained by John Gosden, he won the Esher Cup at Sandown. Geffen and Hood then purchase Arctic Cosmos, and won the St Leger at Doncaster. Geffen also owned Western Hymn a two time Grade 3 winner, and 6th in the 2014 Epsom Derby. Geffen owned GM Hopkins who won the 2015 Royal Hunt Cup at Royal Ascot.

Alongside his flat horses, he also owned National Hunt horses trained by the likes of Paul Nicholls, David Pipe and Nicky Henderson. Geffen owned the likes of Wonderful Charm a two time Grade 2 winner including the Persian War at Chepstow.

In addition to being an owner, Geffen utilised his Neptune Investment Management business as a sponsor. He partnered Cheltenham Racecourse from 2009, and sponsored a broader series of races as "Neptune Investment Management Novices' Hurdles" across Cheltenham, Sandown and Warwick.

== Personal life ==
Geffen is married to Camilla and they have two sons. In 2013, he appeared on the Sunday Times Rich List with a net worth of £90million.

In 2013 Geffen's ex race horse, King of Wands, was the subject of a dispute between him and Aristocratic Escort Charlotte Colquhoun, whom Geffen had gifted the horse to. Geffen had in addition, paid Colquhoun £2,000 towards costs. Colquhoun subsequently went on to sell King of Wands against Geffen's interests, he later went on to label her a "fantasist".
