= Majestic Prince =

American-bred Thoroughbred racehorse (1966–1981)

- Sire: Raise a Native
- Grandsire: Native Dancer
- Dam: Gay Hostess
- Damsire: Royal Charger
- Sex: Stallion
- Foaled: March 19, 1966
- Died: April 22, 1981 (aged 15)
- Country: United States
- Colour: Chestnut
- Breeder: Leslie Combs II
- Owner: Frank McMahon
- Trainer: Johnny Longden
- Rider: Bill Hartack
- Record: 10: 9–1–0
- Earnings: $414,200

Major wins
- Los Feliz Stakes (1969); San Vicente Stakes (1969); Santa Anita Derby (1969); Stepping Stone Purse (1969) American Triple Crown wins: Kentucky Derby (1969); Preakness Stakes (1969)

Honours
- U.S. Racing Hall of Fame (1988) #46 - Top 100 U.S. Racehorses of the 20th Century
- Last updated on September 17, 2006

Majestic Prince (March 19, 1966 – April 22, 1981) was a Thoroughbred racehorse. One of the leading North American horses of his generation, he won the Kentucky Derby and Preakness Stakes in 1969.

== Background ==
In September 1967, Majestic Prince was purchased by Calgary, Alberta, oilman Frank McMahon at the Keeneland yearling sale for a then-record price of $250,000 ($2.4 million inflation adjusted). The California-based colt, that grew to 1,120 pounds, was trained by another Albertan, Johnny Longden, a longtime friend of McMahon, who had retired in 1966 as the winningest jockey of all time.

== Racing career ==
=== Early races ===
Raced lightly as a two-year-old, Majestic Prince won both of his starts in his 1968 fall campaign. Ridden by Bill Hartack, at age three, he quickly became the dominant three-year-old in West Coast racing, capping it off with an eight-length victory in the Santa Anita Derby. Unbeaten, Majestic Prince headed for Louisville and the Kentucky Derby.

=== Kentucky Derby ===
The 1969 Derby had a very strong field that deterred entries, and as such, only eight horses went to the starting gate. Majestic Prince was the betting favorite, followed by Top Knight, winner of the 1968 Eclipse Award for Outstanding Two-Year-Old Male Horse. The third favorite was the highly regarded Claiborne Farm colt Dike, and Paul Mellon's Arts and Letters was the fourth choice. The remaining four horses entered were all at very long odds.

Majestic Prince drew the last post position. Arts and Letters, racing along the rail, took the lead by the time they reached the mile pole and were about to head for the stretch run. Majestic Prince ran the entire race on the outside, but pulled up alongside Arts and Letters into second place as they came down the homestretch, then moved ahead to win by a neck. The victory made Majestic Prince the first unbeaten Kentucky Derby champion in 47 years. Johnny Longden became the only person in history to ever win the Derby both as a jockey and as a trainer, a feat that as of 2019 has not been matched.

=== Preakness Stakes ===
The heavy favorite going into the second leg of the U.S. Triple Crown, Majestic Prince again met Arts and Letters, and the two dueled to the finish, with "The Prince", as the media dubbed him, winning his 9th consecutive race by a head. However, the morning after his victory, Longden advised the media that Majestic Prince came out of the race with a problem in his right front tendon. Longden stated the horse would not be able to run his best in the Belmont Stakes, so he was being shipped back to California to be rested until the fall. When asked by a reporter, McMahon said he concurred with Longden's view, adding, "We want a Triple Crown, not a Crippled Crown."

That the horse with the best chance in 21 years to win the Triple Crown was pulling out brought a frenzy of publicity and questions, particularly because Longden had said the injury was a developing problem, but Majestic Prince could still run, although not at his best. The idea that someone in those circumstances would pass up the chance to achieve American racing immortality seemed incomprehensible.

=== Belmont Stakes ===
To this day, speculation abounds as to why McMahon changed his mind and raced Majestic Prince in the Belmont, but the pressure from the press was intense, including Whitney Tower's article in Sports Illustrated entitled "The Prince Ducks the Big One". The decision to run never sat well with Longden, and despite his well-documented shouting match with the horse's owner in the days leading up to the race, Majestic Prince was still sent out to compete in the Belmont Stakes. The first horse in history to enter the race undefeated, having won the Derby and the Preakness, finished second, beaten by Arts and Letters by 5½ lengths. Majestic Prince never raced again. This feat was later matched by Smarty Jones in 2004.

Jockey Bill Hartack told reporters, "The horse was hurting. We should never have run in [the Belmont]." Longden later commented that Majestic Prince had what was called a check ligament in his right front [leg]. "When he bore out in the Preakness, that was a warning. We never should have run him in the Belmont." Longden said that he tried to bring Majestic Prince back to racing later in 1969 and then again the following year, but could not, and the horse was sold to a racing syndication for $1.8 million. Retired to Spendthrift Farm in Lexington, Kentucky, Majestic Prince sired 33 stakes winners before he died of a heart attack in 1981. Among his progeny was Coastal, winner of the 1979 Belmont Stakes.

== Honors ==
In 1988, Majestic Prince was inducted into the National Museum of Racing and Hall of Fame. In the 2000 Blood-Horse ranking of the top 100 U.S. Thoroughbred champions of the 20th century, he was ranked #46.

== Pedigree ==
Pedigree of Majestic Prince
Sire Raise a Native	Native Dancer	Polynesian	Unbreakable
Sire Raise a Native	Native Dancer	Polynesian	Black Polly
Sire Raise a Native	Native Dancer	Geisha	Discovery
Sire Raise a Native	Native Dancer	Geisha	Miyako
Sire Raise a Native	Raise You	Case Ace	Teddy
Sire Raise a Native	Raise You	Case Ace	Sweetheart
Sire Raise a Native	Raise You	Lady Glory	American Flag
Sire Raise a Native	Raise You	Lady Glory	Beloved
Dam Gay Hostess	Royal Charger	Nearco	Pharos
Dam Gay Hostess	Royal Charger	Nearco	Nogara
Dam Gay Hostess	Royal Charger	Sun Princess	Solario
Dam Gay Hostess	Royal Charger	Sun Princess	Mumtaz Begum
Dam Gay Hostess	Your Hostess	Alibhai	Hyperion
Dam Gay Hostess	Your Hostess	Alibhai	Teresina
Dam Gay Hostess	Your Hostess	Boudoir II	Mahmoud
Dam Gay Hostess	Your Hostess	Boudoir II	Kampala

== See also ==
- List of leading Thoroughbred racehorses

Records
Preceded by Bold Discovery	Most expensive Thoroughbred colt yearling July 1967 – July 1968	Next: Reine Enchanteur
