= David Robinson (philanthropist) =

English businessman (1904–1987)

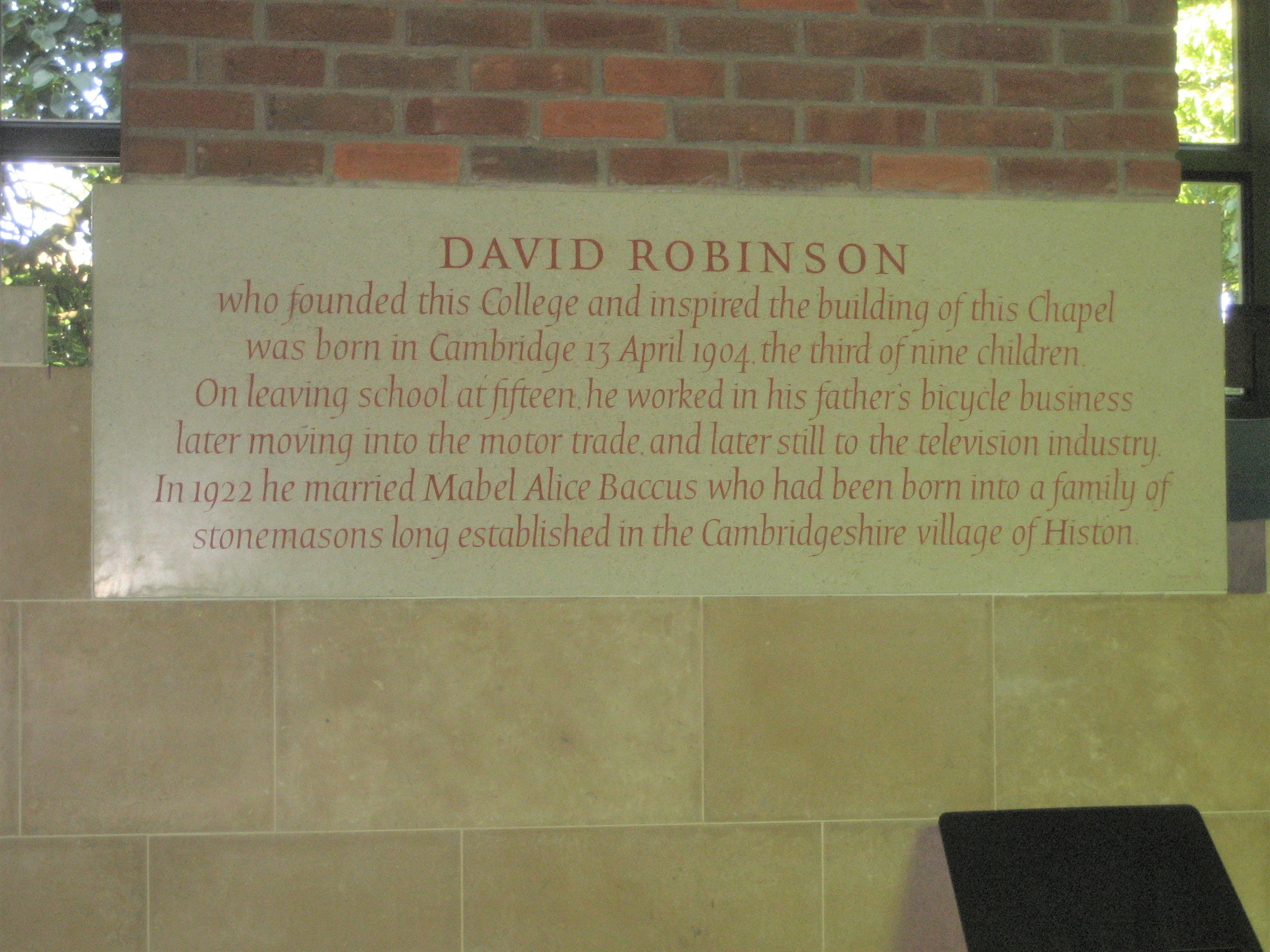
Memorial stone in Robinson College, Cambridge

Sir David Robinson (13 April 1904 – 10 January 1987) was a British entrepreneur and philanthropist.

== Biography ==
Robinson was born in Cambridge, England, the third of six sons and third of nine children of Herbert Robinson, cycle shop and later garage owner, and his wife, Rosie Emily Tricker.

He was educated at the Cambridge and County High School for Boys and left at the age of fifteen in order to work in his father's bicycle shop in Cambridge.

In 1930 he moved to Bedford, where he formed David Robinson Limited in August 1930 to take over a garage and developed it into a large and prosperous firm. In 1937 the company began to acquire a small number of retail radio and electrical shops and also began renting radios and televisions, which was commercially successful. In 1954 the rental business was expanded with the creation of Robinson Rentals. In 1962 the company became public with Eric Kirkham Cole becoming chairman.

Robinson was also involved with horse-racing: in the late 1960s and 1970s he owned a large number of winning horses which also yielded significant profits. His racing stables, Clarehaven, was one of the biggest racing stables in England. His string of 120–150 horses was split between two trainers, Michael Jarvis and Paul Davey.

He was knighted in 1985, and died two years later in Newmarket, the centre of English horse-racing.

== Philanthropy ==
He donated £18 million to the University of Cambridge to establish a new college in his name. Robinson College, Cambridge, the newest in the university, was formally opened in 1981.

Robinson also donated £3 million to start the Rosie Hospital, named after his mother, which is now a part of Addenbrooke's Hospital in Cambridge.

Gifts and a bequest to the Royal National Lifeboat Institution (RNLI) funded three Arun-class lifeboats, placed at Penlee, Buckie and the Relief fleet, and a Tyne-class lifeboat, stationed at The Lizard . A total of 823 launches over a period of 24 years resulted in 314 lives saved. After being withdrawn from the RNLI fleet, all three Arun-class lifeboats saw further service with overseas lifeboat services.

ON (Note: ON is the RNLI's Official Number of the boat.)	Op. No. (Note: Op. No. is the RNLI's Operational Number of the boat carried on the hull.)	Name	Built	In service	Primary station	Cost	Launches Lives Saved	Overseas
1085	52-24	Mabel Alice	1982	1983–2003	Penlee	£350,000	275 / 83	Chile
1093	52-27	Charles Brown	1984	1984–2004	Buckie	£370,000	283 / 172	China
1145	47-030	David Robinson	1988	1988–2016	The Lizard	£550,131	–	–
1160	52-46	Duke of Atholl	1990	1990–2007	Relief fleet	£640,000	265 / 59	Iceland
