= Clarehaven Stables =

Horse racing stable in Suffolk, England

Coordinates: 52.255°N 0.421°E

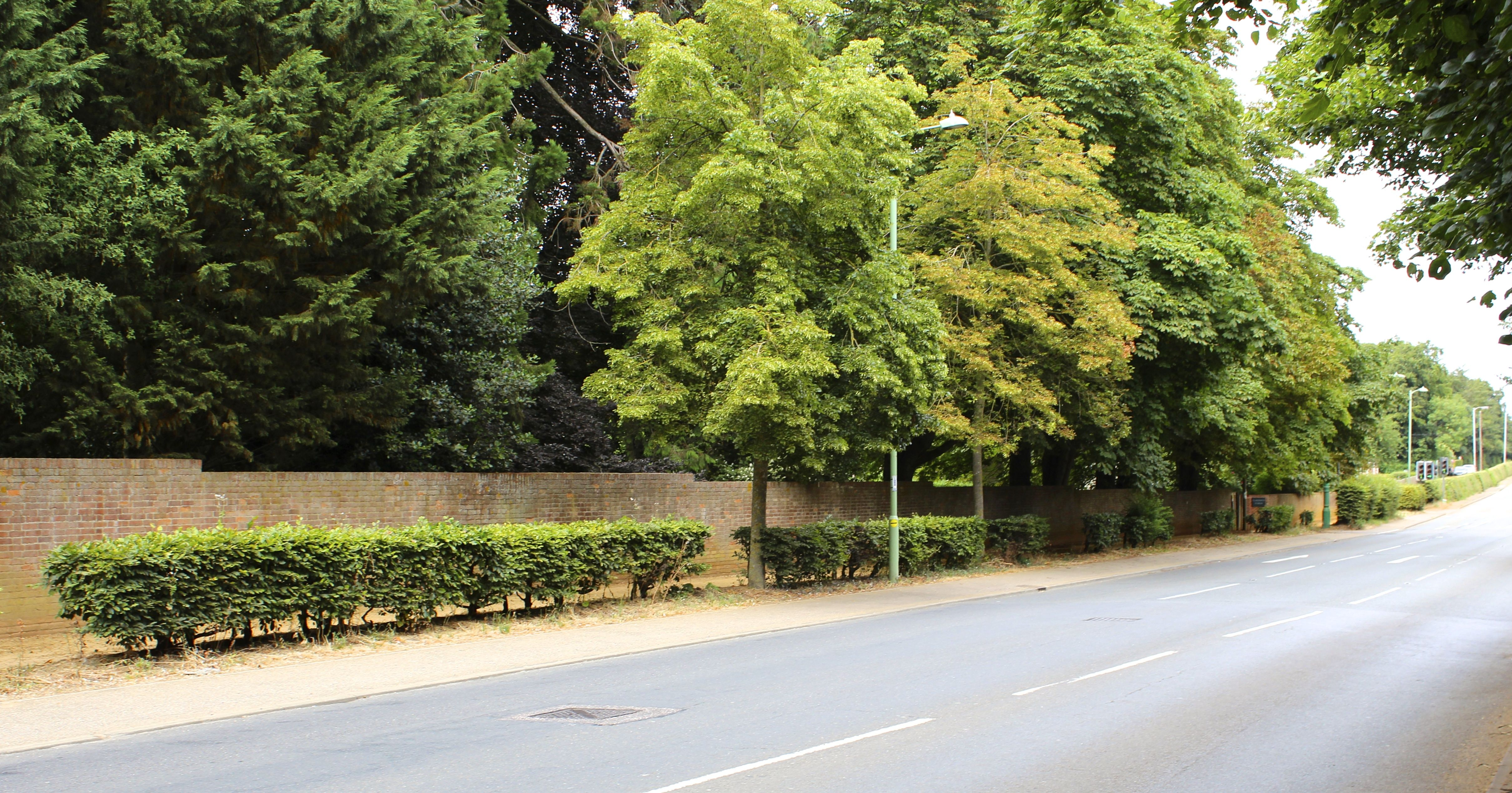
An entrance to Clarehaven Stables from the Bury Road in Newmarket, Suffolk, UK

Clarehaven Stables is a thoroughbred horse racing stable built next to the Bury Road in the horse racing town of Newmarket. Built in 1901, it became home to some of the most celebrated thoroughbreds in British racing history, beginning with the exceptional filly Pretty Polly, who completed the Fillies' Triple Crown in 1904 and won 22 of her 24 career starts. The stables were later associated with the racing operation of the businessman and philanthropist Sir David Robinson in the 1960s and 1970s. Since 2007, Clarehaven has been the home of trainer John Gosden, who has made it the base for one of the most successful flat racing careers in British history.

The stable takes its name from a racehorse called Clarehaven, trained by Peter Gilpin in Dorset at the turn of the twentieth century. The horse won the Cesarewitch Handicap in 1900, and Gilpin — who had won a fortune in bets on the race — used the proceeds to fund the construction of a new, purpose-built yard in Newmarket, which he named after his winner. The name has remained with the stable ever since.

== Trainers ==
=== Foundation and the Gilpin era (1901–1920s) ===
Peter Gilpin established Clarehaven in 1901, and his first intake of yearlings included the horse with whom his name would be forever linked: the filly Pretty Polly. Bred and owned by Major Eustace Loder, Pretty Polly was foaled in 1901 and won all nine of her starts as a two-year-old in 1903, including the Cheveley Park Stakes and the Middle Park Stakes. She won her first race, the British Dominion Plate at Sandown, by a margin widely held to be around forty lengths.

As a three-year-old in 1904, Pretty Polly completed the Fillies' Triple Crown, winning the 1,000 Guineas, the Oaks, and the St Leger, alongside victories in the Coronation Stakes, the Nassau Stakes, and the Park Hill Stakes, bringing her unbeaten sequence to fifteen consecutive victories. She was only the fifth horse to win the Fillies' Triple Crown since its inception in 1814.Pretty Polly retired having won 22 of her 24 races, and was named Broodmare of the Century by racing historians John Randall and Tony Morris, as the matriarch of the most successful female family in Thoroughbred racing history.The British Racing Hall of Fame records that she took on the colts in the St Leger, including that year's 2,000 Guineas and Derby winner St Amant, winning in a canter by three lengths in record time.

=== The David Robinson era (1960s–1980s) ===
During the 1960s and 1970s, Clarehaven was associated with the racing operation of the businessman and benefactor Sir David Robinson, who had built a fortune through his television rental company and became one of the most prolific owners in Britain, winning the Champion Owner title on multiple occasions. Robinson's legacy at Newmarket extended well beyond racing: he donated tens of millions of pounds to the University of Cambridge, with Robinson College (founded in 1977) bearing his name.

=== John Gosden (2007–present) ===
In 2006, John Gosden moved to Clarehaven . Gosden had trained in California from 1979, and subsequently in Britain at Stanley House Stables, Newmarket and at Manton, Wiltshire, before settling at Clarehaven. Earlier in his career he had worked as assistant to Vincent O'Brien and Sir Noel Murless. On arriving at Clarehaven he remarked: "I was in danger of being like my hero Bob Dylan, permanently on the road."

Gosden has trained Breeders' Cup Classic winner Raven's Pass, Derby and Prix de l'Arc de Triomphe winner Golden Horn, St. James's Palace Stakes winner Kingman, Dubai Sheema Classic winner Dar Re Mi, King George VI and Queen Elizabeth Stakes and Eclipse Stakes winner Nathaniel, Irish Oaks winner Great Heavens there, and many others.

Some of the most celebrated horses to have been trained at Clarehaven in the decade since include Enable, who won eleven Group One races including two Prix de l'Arc de Triomphe victories. Enable secured back-to-back Arc triumphs in 2017 and 2018, and also captured the 2018 Breeders' Cup Turf at Churchill Downs, becoming the first horse to win both the Arc and the Turf in the same season. Other champions of the recent decade include Stradivarius, a three-time Ascot Gold Cup winner, the brilliant miler Inspiral, and multiple Group One winners Cracksman, Roaring Lion and Mostahdaf, and the globetrotting Mishriff, winner of the Saudi Cup and Dubai Sheema Classic.

From 2021, Gosden has trained in partnership with his son Thady Gosden. Within just over a month of taking out their joint licence, the pair won the Saudi Cup, the Dubai Turf, and the Dubai Sheema Classic, earning more than £11 million in prize money. John Gosden has been crowned Champion Trainer in Britain five times — in 2012, 2015, 2018, 2019, and 2020 — and in 2023 he and Thady became the first dual licence holders to win the title.
