= Leslie Combs II =

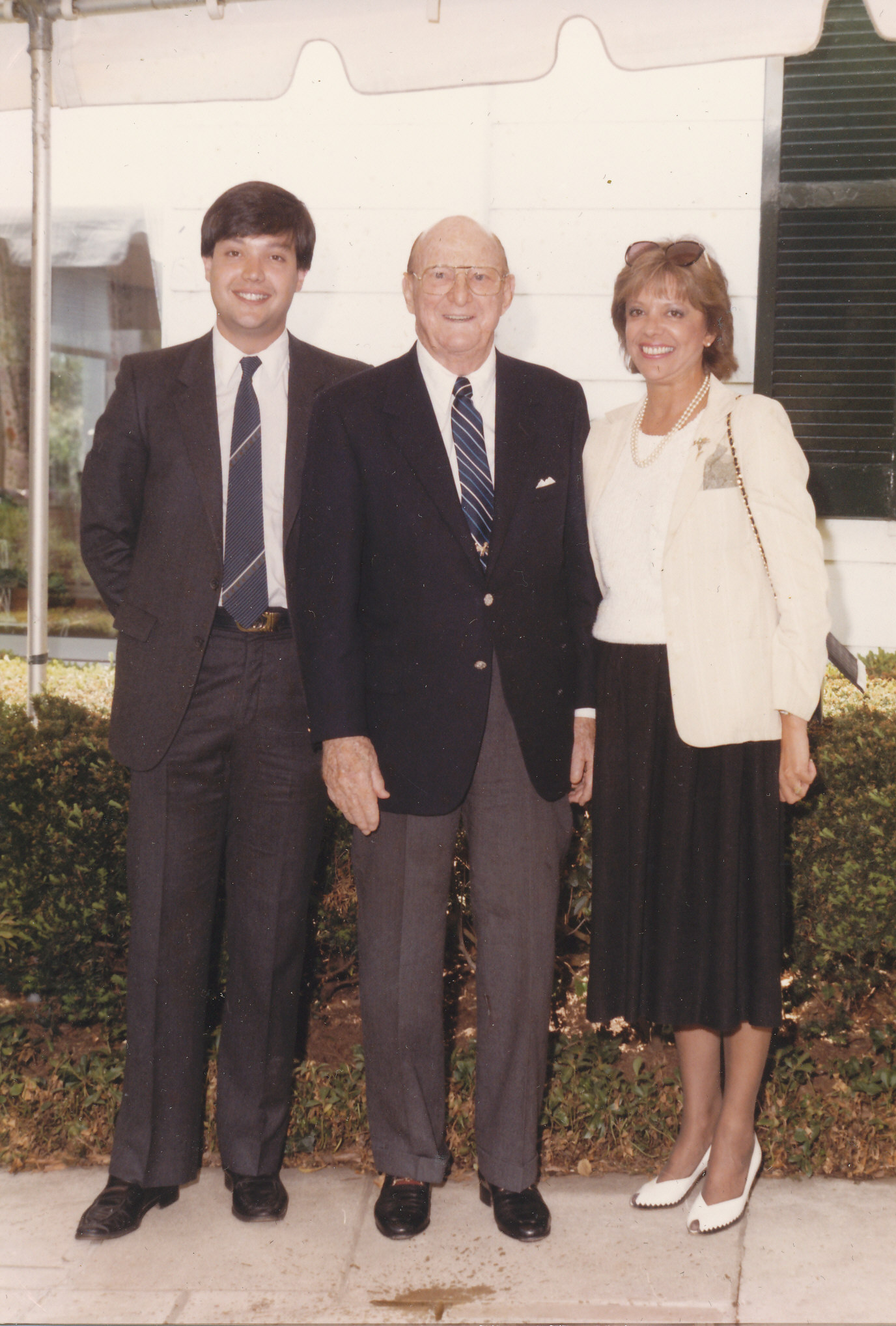
Leslie Combs II, with Yvanne & Mark Glancey

Leslie Combs II (1901–1990) was an American racehorse owner and breeder. He was the founder and owner of the Spendthrift Farm in Lexington, Kentucky.

== Biography ==
=== Early life ===
He was born in 1901. His father Daniel committed suicide when he was only fourteen years old. He attended Centre College in Danville, Kentucky, where he roomed with George Swinebroad.

He spent a year in Guatemala working for Herbert F. Schlubach at the South American Plantation Company and contracted malaria there. Mr. Schlubach was married to his aunt, Annette Combs Schlubach. He returned to Kentucky and worked for the American Rolling Mill Company in Ashland. He moved to Huntington, West Virginia and started his own business, the Combs-Ritter Insurance Company.

=== Horsebreeding ===
In 1937, he bought 127 acres in Lexington from Daniel Swigert and called it Spendthrift Farm in honor of Spendthift. Together with his uncle Brownwell Combs, he owned Myrtle Charm and Myrtlewood. He was also the breeder of Majestic Prince, later owned by Frank M. McMahon. Later, he advised Elizabeth Arden (1884–1966) of Maine Chance Farm about which horses to purchase, including Star Pilot, Beaugay, Jet Pilot, etc. He also revitalized the syndication of racehorses, buying Nashua through a syndication for US$1.25 million.

=== Personal life ===
He married Dorothy Enslow, daughter of the founder of the Columbia Gas and Electric Company, in 1924. He died in 1990.

== Bibliography ==
=== Secondary sources ===
- Mary Marshall, Great Breeders and Their Methods: Leslie Combs II and Spendthrift Farm (Neenah, Wisconsin: Russell Meerdink Co., 2008, 178 pages).
