= Trial races for the Epsom Oaks =

Trial races for the Epsom Oaks are horse races during April and May which are contested by three-year-old fillies likely to run in The Oaks in early June.

The leading trial of recent years has been the 1,000 Guineas Stakes, which has been contested by eight subsequent winners of the Oaks in the last twenty-five years. The following table shows races classed at Listed level or above which served as a trial for an Oaks winner during the period 1992 to 2023.

Race	Oaks winners from race 1992–2018 (won unless stated)
Leopardstown 1,000 Guineas Trial	Imagine (2nd)
Prix Finlande	Intrepidity
Fred Darling Stakes	Sariska (4th)
1,000 Guineas Stakes	Balanchine (2nd), Moonshell (3rd), Reams of Verse (6th), Shahtoush (2nd); Kazzia, Casual Look (6th), Qualify (last), Minding, Love
Pretty Polly Stakes	Ouija Board, Talent, Taghrooda
Athasi Stakes	Imagine (3rd)
Cheshire Oaks	Light Shift, Enable, Forever Together (2nd)
Lingfield Oaks Trial	User Friendly, Lady Carla, Ramruma, Look Here (2nd). Anapurna
Musidora Stakes	Reams of Verse, Alexandrova (2nd), Sariska, Snowfall, Soul Sister
Fillies' Trial Stakes	Eswarah, Dancing Rain (2nd)
Height of Fashion Stakes ^{[a]}	Love Divine, Snow Fairy
Prix Saint-Alary	Intrepidity
Irish 1,000 Guineas	Shahtoush (10th), Imagine, Qualify (10th), Minding (2nd), Tuesday (2nd)

^{a} The Height of Fashion Stakes was known as the Lupe Stakes before 2007.

== 2012 Oaks contenders ==
Notable early-season appearances by horses which ran in the 2012 Oaks.

- Betterbetterbetter: 2nd Cheshire Oaks
- Colima: 2nd Lingfield Oaks Trial
- Coquet: 1st Height of Fashion Stakes
- Devotion: 2nd Derrinstown Stud 1,000 Guineas Trial
- Kailani: 1st Pretty Polly Stakes
- Maybe: 3rd 1,000 Guineas Stakes
- Nayarra: 2nd Nell Gwyn Stakes, 9th 1,000 Guineas Stakes, 4th Height of Fashion Stakes
- Shirocco Star: 2nd Fillies' Trial Stakes
- The Fugue: 4th 1,000 Guineas Stakes, 1st Musidora Stakes
- Twirl: 2nd Park Express Stakes, 2nd Musidora Stakes
- Vow: 1st Lingfield Oaks Trial
- Was (winner): 3rd Blue Wind Stakes

== See also ==
- Trial races for the Epsom Derby
