= Musidora Stakes =

Flat horse race in Britain

- Class: Group 3
- Location: York Racecourse; York, England
- Inaugurated: 1961
- Race type: Flat / Thoroughbred
- Sponsor: Tattersalls
- Website: York

Race information
- Distance: 1m 2f 56y (2,063m)
- Surface: Turf
- Track: Left-handed
- Qualification: Three-year-old fillies
- Weight: 9 st 2 lb Penalties; 4 lb for G1 / G2 winners * * since 31 August 2024
- Purse: £130,000 (2025); 1st: £73,723

Musidora Stakes
2026
Legacy Link	Felicitas	K Sarra

Previous years
2025
Whirl	Serenity Prayer	Go Go Boots
2024
Secret Satire	Francophone	Classical Song
2023
Soul Sister	Novakai	Infinite Cosmos
2022
Emily Upjohn	Life Of Dreams	Ching Shih
2021
Snowfall	Noon Star	Teona

2020-2011
2020
Rose Of Kildare	Albaflora	Ricetta
2019
Nausha	Frankellina	Entitle
2018
Give And Take	Dancing Brave Bear	Ejtyah
2017
Shutter Speed	Vintage Folly	Serenada
2016
So Mi Dar	Fireglow	Promising Run
2015
Star of Seville	Together Forever	Pandora
2014
Madame Chiang	Lily Rules	Regardez
2013
Liber Nauticus	Romantic Settings	Woodland Aria
2012
The Fugue	Twirl	Esentepe
2011
Joviality	Barefoot Lady	Whey Sauce

2010-2001
2010
Aviate	Gold Bubbles	Eleanora Duse
2009
Sariska	Star Ruby	Enticement
2008
Lush Lashes	Cape Amber	Dar Re Mi
2007
Passage of Time	Sweet Lilly	Sues Surprise
2006
Short Skirt	Alexandrova	Maroussies Wings
2005
Secret History	Quickfire	Play Me
2004
Punctilious	Glen Innes	Bay Tree
2003
Cassis	Geminiani	Irtahal
2002
Islington	Spinnette	Alexander Three
2001
Time Away	Relish The Thought	Heavenly Whisper

2000-1991
2000
Kalypso Katie	Lady Upstage	High Walden
1999
Zahrat Dubai	Mother of Pearl	Barafamy
1998
Bahr	Midnight Line	Anna
1997
Reams of Verse	Vagabond Chanteuse	Etoile
1996
Magnificient Style	Sil Sila	Obsessive
1995
Pure Grain	Caramba	Musetta
1994
Hawajiss	Spot Prize	Dance to the Top
1993
Marillette	Iviza	Sueboog
1992
All at Sea	Perfect Circle	Armarama
1991
Gussy Marlowe	Dartrey	Shamshir

1990-1981
1990
In The Groove	Sardegna	Ivrea
1989
Snow Bride	Pilot	Mysteries
1988
Diminuendo	Asl	Princess Genista
1987
Indian Skimmer	Bourbon Girl	Mountain Memory
1986
Rejuvenate	Ala Mahlik	Colorspin
1985
Fatah Flare	Dubian	Ever Genial
1984
Optimistic Lass	Poquito Queen	Sandy Island
1983
Give Thanks	So True	New Coins
1982
Last Feather	Ash Ridge	Cadi Ha
1981
Condessa	Madam Gay	Fairy Footsteps

1980-1978
1980
Bireme	Gift Wrapped	Our Home
1979
Rimosa's Pet	Lightning Record	Odeon
1978
Princess of Man	Sofala	Varishkina

The Musidora Stakes is a Group 3 flat horse race in Great Britain open to three-year-old fillies. It is run over a distance of 1 mile, 2 furlongs and 56 yards (2,063 metres) at York in May.

== History ==
The event is named after Musidora, the Yorkshire-trained winner of the 1,000 Guineas and Epsom Oaks in 1949. Established in 1961, it serves as a leading trial for the Oaks, which is run in late May or early June. The first running was won by Ambergris.

The present race grading system was introduced in 1971, and the Musidora Stakes was given Group 3 status.

In total, eight winners of the race have achieved victory in the Oaks. The first was Noblesse in 1963, and the most recent was Soul Sister in 2023. The 2015 winner, Star of Seville, won the Prix de Diane, the French equivalent of the Oaks.

The Musidora Stakes is currently held on the opening day of York's three-day Dante Festival meeting. It is run the day before the Dante Stakes.

== Records ==
Leading jockey (7 wins):

- Frankie Dettori – Bahr (1998), Punctilious (2004), Star of Seville (2015), So Mi Dar (2016), Shutter Speed (2017), Emily Upjohn (2022), Soul Sister (2023)

Leading trainers (9 wins):

- Sir Henry Cecil – Fatah Flare (1985), Indian Skimmer (1987), Diminuendo (1988), Snow Bride (1989), All at Sea (1992), Magnificient Style (1996), Reams of Verse (1997), Passage of Time (2007), Aviate (2010)
- John Gosden – Marillette (1993), Joviality (2011), The Fugue (2012), Star of Seville (2015), So Mi Dar (2016), Shutter Speed (2017), Emily Upjohn (2022), Soul Sister (2023), Legacy Link (2026)

== Winners ==
Year	Winner	Jockey	Trainer	Time
1961	Ambergris	Lester Piggott	Harry Wragg	2:18.20
1962	Fool's Gold	Harry Carr	Cecil Boyd-Rochfort	2:25.20
1963	Noblesse	Garnie Bougoure	Paddy Prendergast	2:17.80
1964	Ela Marita	Garnie Bougoure	Paddy Prendergast	2:16.20
1965	Arctic Melody	Garnie Bougoure	Paddy Prendergast Jr.	2:17.00
1966	Orabella II	Brian Taylor	Harvey Leader	2:22.40
1967	Palatch	Brian Taylor	Harvey Leader	2:35.00
1968	Exchange	Brian Taylor	Harvey Leader	2:28.80
1969	Lovers Lane	Sandy Barclay	Noel Murless	2:43.00
1970	Whitefoot	Jimmy Lindley	Harry Wragg	2:16.80
1971	Catherine Wheel	John Gorton	Bruce Hobbs	2:12.60
1972	Jakomima	Duncan Keith	Peter Walwyn	2:15.80
1973	Where You Lead	Edward Hide	Vincent O'Brien	2:13.70
1974	Escorial	Lester Piggott	Ian Balding	2:12.18
1975	Moonlight Night	Geoff Lewis	Noel Murless	2:24.12
1976	Everything Nice	Geoff Lewis	Bruce Hobbs	2:19.80
1977	Triple First	Edward Hide	Michael Stoute	2:15.17
1978	Princess of Man	Ernie Johnson	Barry Hills	2:16.11
1979	Rimosa's Pet	Greville Starkey	Michael Stoute	2:14.50
1980	Bireme	Willie Carson	Dick Hern	2:10.49
1981	Condessa	Declan Gillespie	Jim Bolger	2:18.78
1982	Last Feather	Steve Cauthen	Barry Hills	2:15.07
1983	Give Thanks	Declan Gillespie	Jim Bolger	2:18.77
1984	Optimistic Lass	Walter Swinburn	Michael Stoute	2:10.38
1985	Fatah Flare	Steve Cauthen	Henry Cecil	2:13.33
1986	Rejuvenate	Brent Thomson	Barry Hills	2:13.29
1987	Indian Skimmer	Steve Cauthen	Henry Cecil	2:12.57
1988	Diminuendo	Steve Cauthen	Henry Cecil	2:11.46
1989	Snow Bride	Steve Cauthen	Henry Cecil	2:08.25
1990	In the Groove	Ray Cochrane	David Elsworth	2:09.80
1991	Gussy Marlowe	Michael Roberts	Clive Brittain	2:12.23
1992	All At Sea	Pat Eddery	Henry Cecil	2:18.78
1993	Marillette	Pat Eddery	John Gosden	2:15.69
1994	Hawajiss	Walter Swinburn	Michael Stoute	2:10.79
1995	Pure Grain	John Reid	Michael Stoute	2:11.59
1996	Magnificient Style	Michael Kinane	Henry Cecil	2:11.45
1997	Reams of Verse	Kieren Fallon	Henry Cecil	2:11.81
1998	Bahr	Frankie Dettori	Saeed bin Suroor	2:16.22
1999	Zahrat Dubai	Michael Kinane	Saeed bin Suroor	2:15.34
2000	Kalypso Katie	Michael Kinane	Jeremy Noseda	2:12.32
2001	Time Away	Pat Eddery	John Dunlop	2:09.71
2002	Islington	Kieren Fallon	Sir Michael Stoute	2:09.11
2003	Cassis	Pat Eddery	Jeremy Noseda	2:09.08
2004	Punctilious	Frankie Dettori	Saeed bin Suroor	2:22.33
2005	Secret History	Joe Fanning	Mark Johnston	2:19.43
2006	Short Skirt	Michael Kinane	Sir Michael Stoute	2:15.63
2007	Passage of Time	Richard Hughes	Henry Cecil	2:11.78
2008	Lush Lashes	Kevin Manning	Jim Bolger	2:09.78
2009	Sariska	Jamie Spencer	Michael Bell	2:11.41
2010	Aviate	Eddie Ahern	Henry Cecil	2:09.14
2011	Joviality	William Buick	John Gosden	2:10.60
2012	The Fugue	William Buick	John Gosden	2:11.36
2013	Liber Nauticus	Ryan Moore	Sir Michael Stoute	2:14.58
2014	Madame Chiang	Kieren Fallon	David Simcock	2:11.04
2015	Star of Seville	Frankie Dettori	John Gosden	2:11.88
2016	So Mi Dar	Frankie Dettori	John Gosden	2:09.07
2017	Shutter Speed	Frankie Dettori	John Gosden	2:18.62
2018	Give And Take	James Doyle	William Haggas	2:12.04
2019	Nausha	Andrea Atzeni	Roger Varian	2:10.50
2020 (Note: The 2020 race was run in July due to the COVID-19 pandemic in the United Kingdom)	Rose of Kildare	Franny Norton	Mark Johnston	2:10.80
2021	Snowfall	Ryan Moore	Aidan O'Brien	2:15.18
2022	Emily Upjohn	Frankie Dettori	John & Thady Gosden	2:10.86
2023	Soul Sister	Frankie Dettori	John & Thady Gosden	2:10.11
2024	Secret Satire	Oisin Murphy	Andrew Balding	2:12.64
2025	Whirl	Ryan Moore	Aidan O'Brien	2:09.61
2026	Legacy Link	Colin Keane	John & Thady Gosden	2:11.15

== See also ==
- Horse racing in Great Britain
- List of British flat horse races
