= Eshaada =

British Thoroughbred racehorse

- Sire: Muhaarar
- Grandsire: Oasis Dream
- Dam: Muhawalah
- Damsire: Nayef
- Sex: Filly
- Foaled: 5 May 2018
- Country: United Kingdom
- Colour: Bay
- Breeder: Shadwell Estate
- Owner: Shadwell Estate
- Trainer: Roger Varian
- Record: 5: 3-1-0
- Earnings: £327,322

Major wins
- Fillies' Trial Stakes (2021); British Champions Fillies and Mares Stakes (2021)

Eshaada (foaled 5 May 2018) is a British Thoroughbred racehorse. After winning her only start as a juvenile in 2020 she showed high class form over middle and long distances in the following year, winning the Fillies' Trial Stakes and running second in the Ribblesdale Stakes before taking the Group 1 British Champions Fillies and Mares Stakes.

== Background ==
Eshaada is a bay filly with no white markings bred in England by Shadwell Estate, the breeding operation of her owner Hamdan Al Maktoum. She was sent into training with Roger Varian at Newmarket, Suffolk. In her first two seasons she was ridden by Jim Crowley.

She was from the second crop of foals sired by Muhaarar, an outstanding sprinter who won the Commonwealth Cup, July Cup, Prix Maurice de Gheest and British Champions Sprint Stakes. Eshaada's dam Muhawalah showed modest racing ability, winning one minor race from six starts, but was a full-sister to Tamayuz. Muhawalah's dam Al Ishq was a half-sister to Anabaa Blue and a granddaughter of the great British broodmare Allegretta, meaning that she was closely related to Urban Sea, King's Best, Galileo and Sea the Stars.

== Racing career ==
=== 2020: two-year-old season ===
On her first and only appearance as a two-year-old Eshaada started at odds of 9/2 over eight and a half furlongs on soft ground at Nottingham Racecourse on 4 November. After tracking the leaders she made steady progress in the last quarter mile, overtook the front-running Quenelle d'Or in the closing stages and won by a neck.

=== 2021: three-year-old season ===
Hamdan Al Maktoum died in March 2021 and Eshaada's ownership reverted to the Shadwell Estate. The filly began her second campaign in the Listed Fillies' Trial Stakes over ten furlongs at Newbury Racecourse on 15 May and started an 18/1 outsider in a nine-runner field. She raced towards the rear of the field before staying on strongly in the last half mile, taking the lead inside the final furlong and winning by a neck from Gloria Mundi. Eshaada was moved up in class again to contest the Group 2 Ribblesdale Stakes over 1 1/2 miles at Royal Ascot on 17 June. Starting at odds of 17/2 in a thirteen-runner field she came from well off the pace to make good progress in the straight and finished second to Loving Dream, beaten three quarters of a length by the winner. At York Racecourse in August she stepped up to Group 1 class for the Yorkshire Oaks but was never in serious contention and finished last of the seven runners, more than thirtyy-six lengths by the winner Snowfall.

On her final run of the season, Eshaada started a 16/1 outsider for the Group 1 British Champions Fillies and Mares Stakes over 1 1/2 miles on good to soft ground at Ascot on 16 October. Snowfall started the 8/11 favourite while the other six runners were Albaflora (second in the Yorkshire Oaks), Invite (Stand Cup), Tribal Craft (Brontë Cup), La Joconde (third in the Prix Vermeille), Mystery Angel (Pretty Polly Stakes) and Lady Hayes. After tracking the leaders La Joconde and Mystery Angel Eshaada took the lead two furlongs out and held off a sustained challenge from Albaflora to win by a short head with a gap of 3 1/2 lengths back to Snowfall in third place. After the race Roger Varian commented "Her only poor performance was at York and the Ribblesdale form worked out very well. She loves cut in the ground, she's got track form, and has always looked a class filly. After York we discussed what we'd do. There were options between York and this race but we said: 'Let's wait'. She likes cut in the ground, so it was a team decision made in the immediate aftermath of the York race and it's always nice when a plan comes together."

== Pedigree ==
Pedigree of Eshaada (GB), bay filly, 2018
Sire Muhaarar (GB) 2012	Oasis Dream (GB); 2000	Green Desert (USA)	Danzig
Sire Muhaarar (GB) 2012	Oasis Dream (GB); 2000	Green Desert (USA)	Foreign Courier
Sire Muhaarar (GB) 2012	Oasis Dream (GB); 2000	Hope (IRE)	Dancing Brave (USA)
Sire Muhaarar (GB) 2012	Oasis Dream (GB); 2000	Hope (IRE)	Bahamian
Sire Muhaarar (GB) 2012	Tahrir (IRE); 2002	Linamix (FR)	Mendez
Sire Muhaarar (GB) 2012	Tahrir (IRE); 2002	Linamix (FR)	Lunadix
Sire Muhaarar (GB) 2012	Tahrir (IRE); 2002	Miss Sacha	Last Tycoon
Sire Muhaarar (GB) 2012	Tahrir (IRE); 2002	Miss Sacha	Heaven High (GB)
Dam Muhawalah (IRE) 2021	Nayef (USA); 1998	Gulch	Mr Prospector
Dam Muhawalah (IRE) 2021	Nayef (USA); 1998	Gulch	Jameela
Dam Muhawalah (IRE) 2021	Nayef (USA); 1998	Height of Fashion (FR)	Bustino (GB)
Dam Muhawalah (IRE) 2021	Nayef (USA); 1998	Height of Fashion (FR)	Highclere (GB)
Dam Muhawalah (IRE) 2021	Al Ishq (FR); 1997	Nureyev (USA)	Northern Dancer (CAN)
Dam Muhawalah (IRE) 2021	Al Ishq (FR); 1997	Nureyev (USA)	Special
Dam Muhawalah (IRE) 2021	Al Ishq (FR); 1997	Allez Les Trois (USA)	Riverman
Dam Muhawalah (IRE) 2021	Al Ishq (FR); 1997	Allez Les Trois (USA)	Allegretta (GB) (Family: 9-h)
