= Pretty Polly Stakes (Great Britain) =

British Flat horse race

- Class: Listed
- Location: Rowley Mile; Newmarket, England
- Inaugurated: 1962
- Race type: Flat / Thoroughbred
- Sponsor: Betfred
- Website: Newmarket

Race information
- Distance: 1m 2f (2,012 metres)
- Surface: Turf
- Track: Straight
- Qualification: Three-year-old fillies excluding G1 / G2 winners
- Weight: 9 st 2 lb Penalties; 5 lb for Group 3 winners * 3 lb for Listed winners * * after 31 August 2024
- Purse: £60,000 (2025); 1st: £34,026

Pretty Polly Stakes
2026
Jennifer Jane	Sacred Ground	Spinning Lizzie

Previous years
2025
Falakeyah	Life Is Beautiful	Qilin Queen
2024
Friendly Soul	Kalpana	Kitteridge
2023
Running Lion	Sumo Sam	Trust The Stars
2022
With The Moonlight	Mashaaer	Crenelle
2021
Mystery Angel	Sea Karats	Taslima

2020-2011
2020
Run Wild	Queen Daenerys	Trefoil
2019
Maqsad	Shambolic	I'll Have Another
2018
Lah Ti Dar	Expressiy	Qazyna
2017
Horseplay	Isabel De Urbina	Astronomy's Choice
2016
Swiss Range	Chicadoro	Even Song
2015
Jazzi Top	Zannda	Amaze Me
2014
Taghrooda	Jordan Princess	Sound Reflection
2013
Talent	Lady Nouf	Madame Defarge
2012
Kailani	Hazel Lavery	Lacily
2011
Dorcas Lane	Charleston Lady	Izzi Top

2010-2001
2010
Marie De Medici	Red Fantasy	Miss Starlight
2009
Take The Hint	Three Moons	Moneycantbuymelove
2008
Saphira's Fire	Cruel Sea	Don't Forget Faith
2007
Dalvina	Sudoor	La Spezia
2006
Riyalma	Bunood	Park Esteem
2005
Fashionable	Hallowed Dream	Almendrados
2004
Ouija Board	Sahool	Rave Reviews
2003
Hi Dubai	Hold To Ransom	Oblige
2002
Esloob	Disco Volante	Half Glance
2001
Mot Juste	Tarfshi	Time Away

2000-1991
2000
Melikah	Clog Dance	Clipper
1999
Alabaq	Ela Athena	Kilting
1998
Midnight Line	Leggera	Fiamma
1997
Siyadah	Attitre	Vagabond Chanteuse
1996
Pricket	Faraway Waters	Magnificient Style
1995
Musetta	Fanjica	Llia
1994
Wind in Her Hair	Wijdan	Munnaya
1993
Magical Retreat	Bright Generation	Pamzig
1992
All at Sea	Armarama	Mystery Play
1991
Gussy Marlowe	Brockette	Regent's Folly

1990-1988
1990
Sardegna	Wasnah	Katsina
1989
Always On A Sunday	Rambushka	Roseate Tern
1988
La Vie En Primrose	Intimate Guest	Asl

The Pretty Polly Stakes is a Listed flat horse race in Great Britain open to three-year-old fillies. It is run over a distance of 1 mile and 2 furlongs (2,012 metres) on the Rowley Mile at Newmarket in late April or early May.

== History ==
The event is named after Pretty Polly, the winner of the fillies' Triple Crown in 1904. It was established in 1962, and was originally staged at Newmarket's mid-May fixture. It was moved to early May in 1973.

The Pretty Polly Stakes sometimes serves as a trial for the Epsom Oaks. The last horse to win both races was Taghrooda in 2014.

The race is held on the same day as the 1000 Guineas at Newmarket's three-day Guineas Festival meeting.

== Records ==
Leading jockey (9 wins):

- Frankie Dettori – Pricket (1996), Siyadah (1997), Melikah (2000), Mot Juste (2001), Hi Dubai (2003), Marie de Medici (2010), Jazzi Top (2015), Swiss Range (2016), Lah Ti Dar (2018)

Leading trainer (8 wins):

- Sir Henry Cecil – Flirtigig (1972), Cloonagh (1973), Sing Softly (1982), Sandy Island (1984), Indian Skimmer (1987), Sardegna (1990), All at Sea (1992), Midnight Line (1998)
- John Gosden – Take the Hint (2009), Taghrooda (2014), Jazzi Top (2015), Swiss Range (2016), Lah Ti Dar (2018), Run Wild (2021), Running Lion (2023), Friendly Soul (2024)

== Winners ==
Year	Winner	Jockey	Trainer	Time
1962	Military Pickle	Bill Rickaby	Reginald Day	Not taken
1963	Fair Astronomer	Brian Taylor	Harvey Leader	2:05.94
1964	Young Man's Fancy	Doug Smith	Geoffrey Brooke	2:17.04
1965	Miba	Eph Smith	Humphrey Cottrill	2:10.09
1966	Orabella II	Brian Taylor	Harvey Leader	2:07.57
1967	Cranberry Sauce	George Moore	Noel Murless	2:09.79
1968	Celina	Sandy Barclay	Noel Murless	2:11.80
1969	Borana	Sandy Barclay	Noel Murless	2:17.95
1970	Royal Pancake	Tony Murray	Noel Murless	2:09.80
1971	Fleet Wahine	Colin Williams	Harry Thomson Jones	2:05.40
1972	Flirtigig	Bill Williamson	Henry Cecil	2:10.77
1973	Cloonagh	Greville Starkey	Henry Cecil	2:15.24
1974	Lauretta	Pat Eddery	Harry Wragg	2:11.45
1975	Val's Girl	Willie Carson	Bernard van Cutsem	2:13.20
1976	Spiranthes	Ron Hutchinson	John Dunlop	2:09.71
1977	Dunfermline	Willie Carson	Dick Hern	2:06.64
1978	Upper Deck	Willie Carson	Dick Hern	2:15.83
1979	Reprocolor	Greville Starkey	Michael Stoute	2:15.91
1980	Jem Jen	Tony Murray	Paul Kelleway	2:13.59
1981	Humming	Willie Carson	Dick Hern	2:11.56
1982	Sing Softly	Lester Piggott	Henry Cecil	2:07.31
1983	Jolly Bay	Pat Eddery	Jeremy Tree	2:12.52
1984	Sandy Island	Lester Piggott	Henry Cecil	2:07.31
1985	Capo di Monte	Tony Kimberley	Michael Stoute	2:05.37
1986	Gesedeh	Tony Ives	Michael Jarvis	2:09.15
1987	Indian Skimmer	Steve Cauthen	Henry Cecil	2:04.25
1988	La Vie en Primrose	Michael Roberts	Clive Brittain	2:10.91
1989	Always on a Sunday (Note: Rambushka finished first in 1989, but she was relegated to second place following a stewards' inquiry)	Michael Hills	Paul Kelleway	2:08.07
1990	Sardegna	Steve Cauthen	Henry Cecil	2:10.95
1991	Gussy Marlowe	Michael Roberts	Clive Brittain	2:05.74
1992	All at Sea	Pat Eddery	Henry Cecil	2:05.61
1993	Magical Retreat	Darren Biggs	Charles Cyzer	2:08.64
1994	Wind in Her Hair	Richard Hills	John Hills	2:02.14
1995	Musetta	Brett Doyle	Clive Brittain	2:03.67
1996	Pricket	Frankie Dettori	Saeed bin Suroor	2:03.85
1997	Siyadah	Frankie Dettori	Saeed bin Suroor	2:05.15
1998	Midnight Line	Kieren Fallon	Henry Cecil	2:07.05
1999	Alabaq	Richard Hills	John Dunlop	2:03.69
2000	Melikah	Frankie Dettori	Saeed bin Suroor	2:04.00
2001	Mot Juste	Frankie Dettori	Ed Dunlop	2:06.34
2002	Esloob	Richard Hills	Marcus Tregoning	2:04.40
2003	Hi Dubai	Frankie Dettori	Saeed bin Suroor	2:07.68
2004	Ouija Board	Kieren Fallon	Ed Dunlop	2:02.92
2005	Fashionable	Richard Hughes	Barry Hills	2:04.74
2006	Riyalma	Michael Kinane	Sir Michael Stoute	2:10.34
2007	Dalvina	Jamie Spencer	Ed Dunlop	2:03.27
2008	Saphira's Fire	Martin Dwyer	Willie Muir	2:07.27
2009	Take the Hint	Jimmy Fortune	John Gosden	2:01.93
2010	Marie de' Medici	Frankie Dettori	Mark Johnston	2:09.42
2011	Dorcas Lane	Paul Hanagan	Lucy Wadham	2:09.47
2012	Kailani	Mickael Barzalona	Mahmood Al Zarooni	2:09.75
2013	Talent	Jim Crowley	Ralph Beckett	2:04.14
2014	Taghrooda	Paul Hanagan	John Gosden	2:05.68
2015	Jazzi Top	Frankie Dettori	John Gosden	2:03.50
2016	Swiss Range	Frankie Dettori	John Gosden	2:05.40
2017	Horseplay	David Probert	Andrew Balding	2:04.60
2018	Lah Ti Dar	Frankie Dettori	John Gosden	2:04.26
2019	Maqsad	Jim Crowley	William Haggas	2:05.23
2020 (Note: The 2020 race was run in June, due to the COVID-19 pandemic in the United Kingdom)	Run Wild	Oisin Murphy	John Gosden	2:01.87
2021	Mystery Angel	Ben Curtis	George Boughey	2:05.19
2022	With The Moonlight	William Buick	Charlie Appleby	2:02.57
2023	Running Lion	Oisin Murphy	John & Thady Gosden	2:05.86
2024	Friendly Soul	Kieran Shoemark	John & Thady Gosden	2:03.22
2025	Falakeyah	Jim Crowley	Owen Burrows	2:03.34
2026	Jennifer Jane	Silvestre de Sousa	Charlie Johnston	2:03.00

== See also ==
- Pretty Polly Stakes (Ireland)
- Horse racing in Great Britain
- List of British flat horse races
