= Indian Skimmer (horse) =

American-bred Thoroughbred racehorse (1984-c. 2002)

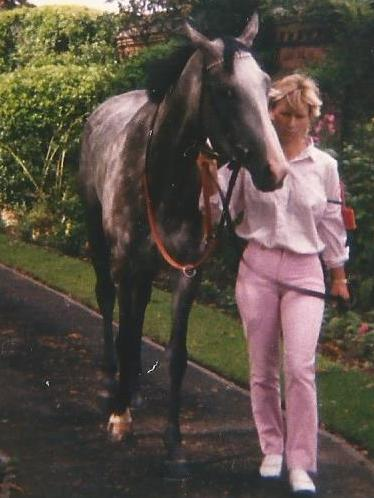
- Indian Skimmer prior to the International Stakes in August 1988
- Sire: Storm Bird
- Grandsire: Northern Dancer
- Dam: Nobilaire
- Damsire: Vaguely Noble
- Sex: Filly
- Foaled: 1984
- Country: United States
- Colour: Grey
- Breeder: Ashford Stud and Ronald J. Worswick
- Owner: Sheik Mohammed bin Rashid Al Maktoum
- Trainer: Henry Cecil
- Record: 16: 10-1-3
- Earnings: US $1,394,814

Major wins
- Pretty Polly Stakes (GB) (1987); Musidora Stakes (1987); Prix Saint-Alary (1987); Prix de Diane (1987); Sun Chariot Stakes (1988); Champion Stakes (1988); Irish Champion Stakes (1988); Prix d'Ispahan (1989); Gordon Richards Stakes (1989)

Awards
- Timeform rating: 133
- Last updated on 15 July 2025

Indian Skimmer (12 February 1984 – c. 2002) was an American-bred, British-trained Thoroughbred racehorse. Trained by Sir Henry Cecil, she was the winner of nine high-class races in Europe, including the French Oaks, the Champion Stakes and the Irish Champion Stakes. Indian Skimmer was one of the top-rated fillies in Europe since World War II.

== Background ==
Bred by MIT graduate Ronald J. Worswick in partnership with Ashford Stud in Versailles, Kentucky, the grey filly was out of the mare Nobilaire and sired by Storm Bird. Her grandsire was Northern Dancer, the top sire of the 20th century, and her damsire was Prix de l'Arc de Triomphe winner Vaguely Noble. Her name is that of the rare Indian skimmer (Rynchops albicollis), a bird. She could be a difficult filly but was brilliant on the racecourse.

== Racing career ==
Owned by Sheik Mohammed and trained by Henry Cecil, Indian Skimmer won top-class Group One races against the best fillies of the day, including a victory over Miesque in the 1987 Prix de Diane. In 1988, she beat some of the best colts in England, Ireland and France. Sent to Churchill Downs in Louisville, Kentucky, she finished third to Great Communicator in that year's Breeders' Cup Turf. The horse was retired from racing at the end of the 1989 season.

She is often considered one of the best, if not the best, fillies trained by Cecil.

== Breeding record ==
As a broodmare, she produced the Mr. Prospector colt, Manshood, who is the sire of the champion South African mare, Ipi Tombe.
