= In the Groove (horse) =

British Thoroughbred racehorse

- Racing silks of Brian Cooper
- Sire: Night Shift
- Grandsire: Northern Dancer
- Dam: Pine Ridge
- Damsire: High Top
- Sex: Mare
- Foaled: 25 February 1987
- Country: United Kingdom
- Colour: Bay
- Breeder: Capt John Macdonald Buchanan
- Owner: Brian Cooper
- Trainer: David Elsworth
- Record: 21:7-4-4
- Earnings: £820,336

Major wins
- Musidora Stakes (1990); Irish 1000 Guineas (1990); International Stakes (1990); Champion Stakes (1990); Sandown Mile (1991); Coronation Cup (1991)

In the Groove (foaled 25 February 1987) was a British Thoroughbred racehorse. In a racing career which lasted from June 1989 until November 1991 she ran in twenty-one races and won seven times, including four at Group One level. After winning once from four starts at two, she developed into a top-class filly at three, winning the Musidora Stakes and the Irish 1000 Guineas against her own age and sex before defeating colts and older horses in the International Stakes and the Champion Stakes. As a four-year-old she won the Sandown Mile and Coronation Cup.

== Background ==
In the Groove was sired by the American-bred stallion Night Shift, a son of Northern Dancer. Night Shift sired many other good racehorses in a long stud career, including the multiple Group One winning Azamour and the leading steeplechaser Well Chief, as well as Lochangel (Nunthorpe Stakes), Barons Pit (Diadem Stakes) and Nicolotte (Queen Anne Stakes). In the Groove's dam Pine Ridge, was descended from the broodmare Lady Grand, whose other descendants included the Irish Derby winner Your Highness and the Oaks Stakes winner Lupe.

== Racing career ==
=== 1989: two-year-old season ===
In June 1989, In the Groove finished second in a maiden race at Newbury Racecourse and then finished second again when odds-on favourite for a similar event at Windsor three weeks later. In August she was sent to York for the Moorestyle Convivial Maiden Stakes over six furlongs. She took the lead a quarter of a mile from the finish and drew clear of her opponents to win easily by six lengths.

=== 1990: three-year-old season ===
In the Groove began her three-year-old season at Newmarket dead heated with heart of joy in the seven furlong Nell Gwyn Stakes, a trial race for the 1000 Guineas. Sixteen days later in the 1000 Guineas over Newmarket's Rowley Mile the filly started at odds of 11/1 and finished eighth of the ten runners, twenty-two lengths behind the winner Salsabil. After her poor performance at Newmarket, In the Groove was moved up in distance for the Musidora Stakes over 10 1/2 furlongs at York. Ridden by Ray Cochrane, she was last of the five runners entering the straight but moved up smoothly to take the lead approaching the final furlong and won by 1 1/2 lengths from the odds-on favourite Sardegna. On 26 May, the filly was brought back in distance for the Irish 1000 Guineas over one mile at the Curragh. Cauthen held the filly up at the back of the field before switching to the outside in the straight. In the Groove took the lead inside the final furlong and accelerated clear of the field to win by three lengths.

On 9 June, In the Groove was one of eight fillies to contest the 212th running of the Oaks Stakes over 1 1/2 miles at Epsom Downs Racecourse. Ridden by Cash Asmussen, she started second favourite and finished fourth behind Salsabil, Game Plan and Knight's Baroness. After a break of more than two months, In the Groove was sent to York, where she was matched against colts and older horses in the Juddmonte International Stakes. Cauthen restrained the filly in the early stage before moving her up to take the lead in the final quarter mile. She won by 1 1/2 lengths from the Eclipse Stakes winner Elmaamul, with the favourite Batshoof beating Terimon for third.

In September In the Groove ran in the Prix Vermeille over 2,400 metres at Longchamp Racecourse in which she finished strongly to take third place, beaten a neck and half a length by Salsabil and Miss Alleged. Over the same course and distance a month later, In the Groove contested Europe's most prestigious all-aged race, the Prix de l'Arc de Triomphe. She finished ninth of the twenty-one runners, nine lengths behind the winner Saumarez. Two weeks after her run at Longchamp, In the Groove started 9/2 second favourite for the Dubai Champion Stakes at Newmarket. Cauthen restrained the filly as usual in the early stages before moving forward in the final quarter mile. She overtook the Poule d'Essai des Poulains winner Linamix approaching the final furlong and won by 1 1/2 lengths.

=== 1991: four-year-old season ===
On her first appearance of 1991, In the Groove was brought back in distance for THF Mile at Sandown Park Racecourse. Last of the five runners entering the straight, the filly took the lead in the final furlong and won by a length from Zoman.

A year after her defeat in the Oaks, In the Groove returned to contest the Coronation Cup over the same course and distance. Cauthen sent her into the lead approaching the final furlong and she won the race from Terimon, Rock Hopper and the 1990 Epsom Derby winner Quest for Fame.

In the Groove failed to win in her remaining four races. She finished third when odds-on favourite for the Select Stakes at Goodwood and then finished sixth to Suave Dancer in the Prix de l'Arc de Triomphe. She started favourite to repeat her 1990 victory in the Champion Stakes but after being hampered in the straight she finished a close third behind Tel Quel and Cruachan.

== Stud record ==
In the Groove was retired from racing to become a broodmare, but had little success as a dam of winners. Her daughter Incarvillea, sired by Mr Prospector, won races at Newmarket and Pontefract as a two-year-old in 1995.

== Pedigree ==
Pedigree of In the Groove (GB), bay mare, 1987
Sire Night Shift (USA) 1980	Northern Dancer (CAN); 1961	Nearctic	Nearco
Sire Night Shift (USA) 1980	Northern Dancer (CAN); 1961	Nearctic	Lady Angela
Sire Night Shift (USA) 1980	Northern Dancer (CAN); 1961	Natalma	Native Dancer
Sire Night Shift (USA) 1980	Northern Dancer (CAN); 1961	Natalma	Almahmoud
Sire Night Shift (USA) 1980	Ciboulette (CAN); 1961	Chip Chop	Flares
Sire Night Shift (USA) 1980	Ciboulette (CAN); 1961	Chip Chop	Sceptical
Sire Night Shift (USA) 1980	Ciboulette (CAN); 1961	Windy Answer	Windfields
Sire Night Shift (USA) 1980	Ciboulette (CAN); 1961	Windy Answer	Reply
Dam Pine Ridge (GB) 1980	High Top (IRE); 1969	Derring-Do	Darius
Dam Pine Ridge (GB) 1980	High Top (IRE); 1969	Derring-Do	Sipsey Bridge
Dam Pine Ridge (GB) 1980	High Top (IRE); 1969	Camenae	Vimy
Dam Pine Ridge (GB) 1980	High Top (IRE); 1969	Camenae	Madrilene
Dam Pine Ridge (GB) 1980	Wounded Knee (GB); 1973	Busted	Crepello
Dam Pine Ridge (GB) 1980	Wounded Knee (GB); 1973	Busted	Sans le Sou
Dam Pine Ridge (GB) 1980	Wounded Knee (GB); 1973	La Lidia	Matador
Dam Pine Ridge (GB) 1980	Wounded Knee (GB); 1973	La Lidia	Lady Grand (Family: 1-k)
