= Reams of Verse =

American-bred Thoroughbred racehorse

- Racing colours of Khalid Abdulla
- Sire: Nureyev
- Grandsire: Northern Dancer
- Dam: Modena
- Damsire: Roberto
- Sex: Mare
- Foaled: 23 April 1994
- Country: United States
- Colour: Chestnut
- Breeder: Juddmonte Farms
- Owner: Khalid Abdulla
- Trainer: Henry Cecil
- Record: 9: 5-1-1
- Earnings: £335,782

Major wins
- May Hill Stakes (1996); Fillies' Mile (1996); Musidora Stakes (1997); Epsom Oaks (1997)

Honours
- Timeform rating 121

Reams of Verse (23 April 1994 – 2009) was an American-bred, British-trained Thoroughbred racehorse and broodmare best known for winning The Oaks in 1997. In a racing career which lasted from July 1996 to October 1997 the filly won five of the nine races she ran. Reams of Verse was one of the leading European two-year-old fillies of 1996 when she won three of her four races, including the May Hill Stakes at Doncaster and the Fillies' Mile at Ascot. She was unplaced in the 1000 Guineas the following spring but then won the Musidora Stakes at York and the Classic Oaks over one and a half miles at Epsom. She was beaten in her two remaining races, finishing fourth in the Yorkshire Oaks and third in the Sun Chariot Stakes.

== Background ==
Reams of Verse was a chestnut mare with a white star and one white sock, bred in Kentucky by her owner Khalid Abdulla's Juddmonte Farms. Reams of Verse was sired by the disqualified 2000 Guineas winner Nureyev out of the Roberto mare Modena. Apart from Reams of Verse, Nureyev sired the winners of at least forty-five Group One/Grade I including Peintre Celebre, Spinning World, Zilzal, Stravinsky and Miesque. His career as a stallion has been described as "outstanding". Modena had previously produced the Eclipse Stakes winner Elmaamul and was a half-sister to Zaizafon, the dam of the 2000 Guineas winner Zafonic. Another, half-sister, Midsummer, produced the racemare Midday, the winner of six Group One races.

Reams of Verse was sent to England for her racing career and was trained by Henry Cecil at his Warren Place stables at Newmarket, Suffolk.

== Racing career ==
=== 1996: two-year-old season ===
On her first appearance, Reams of Verse started 5/4 favourite for a seven furlong maiden race at Newmarket in July. She took the lead in the last quarter of a mile but was caught in the closing stages and beaten a neck by Ovation. In a similar event over the same course and distance a month later, Reams of Verse recorded her first win, beating Bint Baladee by a neck at odds of 4/7. In September, the filly was moved up in class and distance for the Group Three May Hill Stakes over one mile at Doncaster's St Leger meeting. Ridden by Pat Eddery, she took the lead approaching the final furlong and won by two lengths from Dame Laura. On her final appearance of the year, Reams of Verse was promoted to Group One level for the Fillies' Mile at Ascot, where she started third favourite behind her stable companion Sleepytime and the Prestige Stakes winner Red Camellia. Mick Kinane restrained the filly in the early stages before challenging for the lead in the straight. Reams of Verse went to the front a furlong from the finish and despite hanging to the right in the closing stages, she stayed on to win from Khassah, with Sleepytime an apparently unlucky third.

=== 1997: three-year-old season ===
Reams of Verse missed the early trial races in 1997 as she had suffered from a cough and Cecil felt that she would be unsuited by the prevailing firm ground. She therefore began her three-year-old season in the 1000 Guineas at Newmarket on 4 May. She was not among the favourites, starting at odds of 11/1, and finished sixth of the fifteen runners behind Sleepytime. Nine days after her run at Newmarket, Reams of Verse was moved up to ten furlongs for the Musidora Stakes (a trial race for the Epsom Oaks) at York. She was ridden for the first time by Cecil's new stable jockey Kieren Fallon, who had been impressed by the filly's performances in training. Reams of Verse took the lead in the straight and drew clear of her opponents to win by eleven lengths, and was immediately the subject of heavy betting for the Oaks three weeks later.

On 6 June at Epsom, Reams of Verse started 5/6 favourite for the Oaks against eleven other fillies, despite fears that her pedigree lacked the stamina influences needed for the race. Her main rivals in the betting were her stable companion Yashmak (winner of the Fillies' Trial Stakes) and the Irish-trained Ebadiyla. Reams of Verse was hampered in the straight as Fallon struggled to obtain room for a challenge and had to switch to the outside. Once in the clear, the filly finished strongly to take the lead inside the final furlong and took the classic by one and a half lengths from Gazelle Royale and Crown of Light. After the race, Fallon claimed that he was never worried, as he trusted in the filly's "turn of foot" (acceleration).

After a break of well over two months, Reams of Verse reappeared against older fillies in the Yorkshire Oaks. She started 4/7 favourite but never reached the lead and weakened in the closing stages to finish fourth behind the four-year-old My Emma. After the race, Cecil expressed his view that the filly did not truly stay the mile and a half distance and that "it was only her class that got her through in the [Epsom] Oaks." Following another break, Reams of Verse ran in the Sun Chariot Stakes (then a Group Two race) at Newmarket in October. Fallon restrained the 9/4 favourite in the early stages before moving forward a quarter of the mile from the finish. Reams of Verse made no further progress and finished third of the eight runners behind One So Wonderful.

== Assessment and honours ==
The independent Timeform organisation gave Reams of Verse a rating of 121.

In their book, A Century of Champions, based on the Timeform rating system, John Randall and Tony Morris rated Reams of Verse an "inferior" winner of the Oaks.

== Stud record ==
Reams of Verse was retired to become a broodmare for Juddmonte Farms. She had some success at stud, producing several winners including Eagle Poise, whose successes included the Valedictory Stakes at Woodbine Racetrack in 2011. Her son World Domination (by Empire Maker) was regarded as a potential classic winner in 2011, but did not live up to expectations. Her daughter Ithaca produced the Celebration Mile winner Zacinto.

2001 Ithaca (USA) : Chesnut filly, foaled 17 January, by Distant View (USA) – won 1 race and 2nd G3 Prestige Stakes, Goodwood; 3rd LR Distaff Stakes, Sandown; 3rd LR Sceptre Stakes, Doncaster from 10 starts in England 2003–04 – dam of Zacinto (GB) won G2 Celebration Mile, Goodwood

2003 General Knowledge (USA) : Chesnut gelding, foaled 25 April, by Diesis (GB) – won 3 races in France and England 2006–08

2004 Many Volumes (USA) : Bay colt, foaled 18 April, by Chester House (USA) – won 4 races including LR Gala Stakes, Sandown; 2nd LR Wolferton Stakes, Royal Ascot; 3rd LR Foundation Stakes, Goodwood from 18 starts in England 2006–08

2006 Eagle Poise (USA) : Bay gelding, foaled 1 January, by Empire Maker (USA) – won 1 race G3 Valedictory Stakes, Woodbine; 2nd G2 San Juan Capistrano Handicap, Santa Anita; 2nd G3 Valedictory Stakes, Woodbine from 16 starts in Canada and U.S.A. 2009–13

2008 World Domination (USA) : Bay colt, foaled 25 March, by Empire Maker (USA) – won 1 race and 4th G2 Dante Stakes, York from 7 starts in England 2011–13

== Pedigree ==
Pedigree of Reams of Verse (USA), chestnut mare, 1994
Sire Nureyev (USA) 1977	Northern Dancer; 1961	Nearctic	Nearco
Sire Nureyev (USA) 1977	Northern Dancer; 1961	Nearctic	Lady Angela
Sire Nureyev (USA) 1977	Northern Dancer; 1961	Natalma	Native Dancer
Sire Nureyev (USA) 1977	Northern Dancer; 1961	Natalma	Almahmoud
Sire Nureyev (USA) 1977	Special; 1969	Forli	Aristophanes
Sire Nureyev (USA) 1977	Special; 1969	Forli	Trevisa
Sire Nureyev (USA) 1977	Special; 1969	Thong	Nantallah
Sire Nureyev (USA) 1977	Special; 1969	Thong	Rough Shod
Dam Modena (USA) 1983	Roberto; 1969	Hail To Reason	Turn-To
Dam Modena (USA) 1983	Roberto; 1969	Hail To Reason	Nothirdchance
Dam Modena (USA) 1983	Roberto; 1969	Bramalea	Nashua
Dam Modena (USA) 1983	Roberto; 1969	Bramalea	Rarelea
Dam Modena (USA) 1983	Mofida; 1974	Right Tack	Hard Tack
Dam Modena (USA) 1983	Mofida; 1974	Right Tack	Polly Macaw
Dam Modena (USA) 1983	Mofida; 1974	Wold Lass	Vilmorin
Dam Modena (USA) 1983	Mofida; 1974	Wold Lass	Cheb (Family: 9-e)
