= Cloonagh =

Irish-bred Thoroughbred racehorse

- Sire: High Hat
- Grandsire: Hyperion
- Dam: Zoom
- Damsire: Zucchero
- Sex: Mare
- Foaled: 1970
- Country: Ireland
- Colour: Brown
- Breeder: Tally-Ho Stud
- Owner: Arthur Boyd-Rochfort
- Trainer: Henry Cecil
- Record: 8: 3-1-1

Major wins
- Pretty Polly Stakes (1973); Irish 1000 Guineas (1973)

Awards
- Timeform rating 97 (1972), 113 (1973)

Cloonagh (1970 – 1975) was an Irish-bred, British-trained Thoroughbred racehorse and broodmare. After winning one minor race as a two-year-old she showed great improvement in the following spring when she took the Pretty Polly Stakes in England before recording her biggest win in the Irish 1000 Guineas. She was well beaten in her last two races and was retired at the end of the season. She produced one foal before dying in 1975 at the age of five.

== Background ==
Cloonagh was a compact, medium-sized brown mare with no white markings bred in Ireland by the Tally Ho Stud which was managed by her owner Arthur Boyd-Rochfort, the son of the leading trainer Cecil Boyd-Rochfort. During her racing career, she was trained by Arthur Boyd-Rochfort's younger step-brother Henry Cecil at the Marriott Stables in Newmarket, Suffolk.

She was sired by High Hat, who won several races (including an upset victory over Petite Etoile) for his owner Sir Winston Churchill, and whose other progeny included the 1000 Guineas winner Glad Rags. She was the eighth foal and seventh winner produced by her dam Zoom. She was descended from the British broodmare Serena (foaled 1929) who was the female-line ancestor of many other good winners including Arctic Prince and the Champion Stakes winners Solar Slipper and Peter Flower.

== Racing career ==
=== 1972: two-year-old season ===
After finishing second over six furlongs on her racecourse debut Cloonagh consisted the Selsey Stakes over the same distance at Goodwood Racecourse in July. She took the lead in the closing stages and won by a neck from the Dick Hern-trained Regatta, with a long gap back to the other runners. On her only other appearance of the year she ran well when finishing third in a nursery (a handicap race for two-year-olds) over seven and a half furlongs at Newbury in September.

=== 1973: three-year-old season ===
Cloonagh made little impact on her three-year-old debut when she finished sixth behind Caspian in the Nell Gwyn Stakes over seven furlongs on good to firm ground at Newmarket Racecourse in April. The ground was much softer when the filly was moved up in distance for the Pretty Polly Stakes over ten furlongs at the same track on 5 May. She recorded her first significant success as she won by half a length from Isteia (later to win the Lancashire Oaks) with Guest Night in third. The field for the Irish 1000 Guineas over one mile at the Curragh on 19 May was not particularly strong: Timeform described the race as the weakest of any classic race run in Britain, France or Ireland that year. The Bedford Guineas Trial winner Annerbelle started favourite ahead of Daria (Athasi Stakes) with Cloonagh, ridden by Greville Starkey the 7/1 third choice in a twelve-runner field. Cloonagh, who only British-trained challenger, raced prominently from the start and moved up to challenge for the lead approaching the final furlong. She broke clear of her rivals and won by two lengths from Annerbelle, with Desert Nyymph third and Lufar fourth.

In the Coronation Stakes at Royal Ascot in June, Cloonagh became very agitated before the start and ran poorly, finishing eighth of the nine runners behind Jacinth. The filly was off the course until September when she was matched against male opposition in the Valdoe Stakes over ten furlongs at Goodwood. She finished sixth to the colt So Royal, to whom she was conceding 17 pounds in weight.

== Assessment ==
Cloonagh's juvenile form was not good enough for her to be assigned a weight in the Free Handicap, a ranking of the best two-year-olds to race in Britain. The independent Timeform organisation gave her a rating of 97, 36 pounds behind their best two-year-old filly Jacinth. In the following year she was rated 113 by Timeform, 19 pounds behind their top-rated three-year-old fillies Allez France and Dahlia. In the British Free Handicap for three-year-olds she was allotted a weight of 116 pounds, 24 pounds behind the top-rated pair Dahlia and Thatch.

== Breeding record ==
Cloonagh died in 1975, shortly after producing her only foal, a filly sired by Run the Gantlet named Vestina. Trained as her mother had been by Henry Cecil, Vestina won two races as a three-year-old in 1978. Vestina's only recorded foal was the gelding Night-Shirt (foaled 1987) who won seven of his fourteen races.

== Pedigree ==
Pedigree of Cloonagh, brown mare, 1970
Sire High Hat (GB) 1957	Hyperion (GB); 1930	Gainsborough	Bayardo
Sire High Hat (GB) 1957	Hyperion (GB); 1930	Gainsborough	Rosedrop
Sire High Hat (GB) 1957	Hyperion (GB); 1930	Selene	Chaucer
Sire High Hat (GB) 1957	Hyperion (GB); 1930	Selene	Serenissima
Sire High Hat (GB) 1957	Madonna (GB); 1945	Donatello	Blenheim
Sire High Hat (GB) 1957	Madonna (GB); 1945	Donatello	Delleana
Sire High Hat (GB) 1957	Madonna (GB); 1945	Women's Legion	Coronach
Sire High Hat (GB) 1957	Madonna (GB); 1945	Women's Legion	Victress
Dam Zoom (IRE) 1957	Zucchero (GB); 1948	Nasrullah	Nearco
Dam Zoom (IRE) 1957	Zucchero (GB); 1948	Nasrullah	Mumta Begum
Dam Zoom (IRE) 1957	Zucchero (GB); 1948	Castagnola	Bois Roussel
Dam Zoom (IRE) 1957	Zucchero (GB); 1948	Castagnola	Queen of Scots
Dam Zoom (IRE) 1957	Martia (GB); 1949	Court Martial	Fair Trial
Dam Zoom (IRE) 1957	Martia (GB); 1949	Court Martial	Instantaneous
Dam Zoom (IRE) 1957	Martia (GB); 1949	Serenoa	Solario
Dam Zoom (IRE) 1957	Martia (GB); 1949	Serenoa	Serena (Family: 10-c)
