= Fillies' Trial Stakes =

Flat horse race in Britain

- Class: Listed
- Location: Newbury Racecourse; Newbury, England
- Race type: Flat / Thoroughbred
- Sponsor: Childwickbury Stud
- Website: Newbury

Race information
- Distance: 1m 2f (2,012m)
- Surface: Turf
- Track: Left-handed
- Qualification: Three-year-old fillies
- Weight: 9 st 0 lb Penalties; 5 lb for Group winners * 3 lb for Listed winners * * since 31 August 2018
- Purse: £70,000 (2019); 1st: £39,697

Fillies' Trial Stakes
2026
Esna	Sacred Ground	Lady Roisia

Previous years
2025
Qilin Queen	Revoir	Sand Gazelle
2024
Diamond Rain	Ejaabiyah	Siyola
2023
Warm Heart	Bluestocking	Crack Of Light
2022
Nashwa	Stay Alert	Mukaddamah
2021
Eshaada	Gloria Mundi	Aristia

2020-2011
2019
Queen Power	Lavender's Blue	Star Catcher
2018
Sea of Class	Athena	Crystal Hope
2017
Natavia	Flood Warning	Aljezeera
2016
We Are Ninety	Beautiful Morning	Nezwaah
2015
Crystal Zvezda	Montalcino	Pamona
2014
Volume	Lahinch Classics	Hadaatha
2013
Winsili	Cruck Realta	The Lark
2012
Momentary	Shirocco Star	Starscope
2011
Izzi Top	Dancing Rain	Rumh

2010-2001
2010
Principal Role	Fatanah	Pollenator
2009
Apple Charlotte	The Miniver Rose	Uvinza
2008
Clowance	Kotsi	Hobby
2007
Measured Tempo	In Safe Hands	Ransom Captive
2006
Scottish Stage	Guilia	Makderah
2005
Eswarah	Favourita	Aunt Julia
2004
Rave Reviews	Sahool	Crystal Curling
2003
Sun On The Sea	Waldmark	Felicity
2002
Monturani	Protectress	Atarama
2001
Santa Isobel	Nafisah	Fully Invested

2000-1991
2000
Whitefoot	Circle Of Light	Premier Prize
1999
Nasheed	Samoa	Elhilmeya
1998
Jibe	Genoa	Akarita
1997
Yashmak	Tempting Prospect	Boojum
1996
Mezzogiorno	Quota	Miss Universal
1995
Spout	Fleet Hill	Bint Zamayem
1994
Wind In Her Hair	Bearall	Interim
1993
Athens Belle	Fayfa	Ribbonwood
1992
Saratoga Source	Jezebel Monroe	Mystery Play
1991
Magnificent Star	Positive Acclaim	Majmu

1990-1988
1990
Kartajana	Katsina	Akamantis
1989
Knoosh	Mamaluna	Shyoushka
1988
Sudden Love	Intimate Guest	Timely

The Fillies' Trial Stakes is a Listed flat horse race in Great Britain open to three-year-old fillies. It is run over a distance of 1 mile and 2 furlongs (2,012 metres) at Newbury in May.

== History ==
The race was formerly called the Sandleford Priory Stakes. It was named after Sandleford Priory, a historic building located to the south of Newbury.

The event was renamed in memory of Sir Charles Clore, a successful racehorse owner, in 1980. It continued as the Sir Charles Clore Memorial Stakes until 1988.

The title "Fillies' Trial Stakes" was introduced in 1989. From this point the race was sponsored by William Hill, and it was later backed by Vodafone. Swettenham Stud took over the sponsorship in 2002 and backed the race until the 2015 running when it was taken over by Haras de Bouquetot. Since 2025 the race has been sponsored by the historic Childwickbury Stud.

The Fillies' Trial Stakes can serve as a trial for the Epsom Oaks. The last participant to win the Oaks was Dancing Rain, the runner-up in 2011.The 2022 winner, Nashwa, won the Prix de Diane, France's equivalent of the Oaks.

== Records ==
Leading jockey (4 wins):

- Ray Cochrane – Merle (1985), Sudden Love (1988), Saratoga Source (1992), Mezzogiorno (1996)
- Ryan Moore – Scottish Stage (2006), Crystal Zvezda (2015), Natavia (2017), Warm Heart (2023)
- Lester Piggott – Mandera (1973), Furioso (1974), Strigida (1981), Circus Plume (1984)

Leading trainer (5 wins):

- Sir Henry Cecil – Strigida (1981), Yashmak (1997), Jibe (1998), Apple Charlotte (2009), Principal Role (2010)
- Sir Michael Stoute – Knoosh (1989), Kartajana (1990), Scottish Stage (2006), Crystal Zvezda (2015), Queen Power (2019)

== Winners ==
Year	Winner	Jockey	Trainer	Time
1959	Dame Melba	Lester Piggott	Noel Murless	2:09.80
1960	Green Opal	Eph Smith	Noel Murless	2:10.00
1961	Tender Word	Joe Mercer	Jack Colling	2:09.20
1962	Illuminous	Eph Smith	Ted Leader	2:06.40
1963	Tanned	Joe Mercer	Dick Hern	2:10.40
1964	Words And Music	Ron Hutchinson	Herbert Blagrave	2:10.00
1965	Cloudy Symbol	Tommy Carter	Ian Balding	2:17.60
1966	Royal Flirt	Ron Hutchinson	Geoffrey Brooke	2:10.20
1967	Resilience	Brian Taylor	Harvey Leader	2:11.80
1968	Tudor Gal	Geoff Lewis	Ian Balding	2:22.00
1969	Gambola	Bill Williamson	Gordon Smyth	2:16.20
1970	Francoise	Bill Williamson	George Todd	2:10.00
1971	Albany	Joe Mercer	Dick Hern	2:07.87
1972	Sarkless Kitty	Geoff Lewis	Noel Murless	2:16.79
1973	Mandera	Lester Piggott	Jeremy Tree	2:11.92
1974	Furioso	Lester Piggott	Harry Wragg	2:07.24
1975	Foiled Again	Frank Morby	Peter Walwyn	2:14.53
1976	Sarania	Pat Eddery	Jeremy Tree	2:09.09
1977	High Finale	Philip Waldron	Henry Candy	2:16.82
1978	Double Lock	Tony Kimberley	Jeremy Hindley	2:13.88
1979	Scintillate	Steve Cauthen	Jeremy Tree	Not taken
1980	The Dancer	Willie Carson	Dick Hern	2:06.32
1981	Strigida	Lester Piggott	Henry Cecil	2:11.01
1982	Zinzara	Pat Eddery	Harry Wragg	2:06.05
1983	Ski Sailing	Steve Cauthen	Barry Hills	2:19.94
1984	Circus Plume	Lester Piggott	John Dunlop	2:09.87
1985	Merle	Ray Cochrane	Ron Sheather	2:09.41
1986	Pilot Bird	Willie Carson	Dick Hern	2:10.84
1987	Percy's Lass	Paul Eddery	Geoff Wragg	2:07.77
1988	Sudden Love	Ray Cochrane	Luca Cumani	2:02.16
1989	Knoosh	Walter Swinburn	Michael Stoute	2:04.06
1990	Kartajana	Walter Swinburn	Michael Stoute	2:08.00
1991	Magnificent Star	Tony Cruz	Mohammed Moubarak	2:13.34
1992	Saratoga Source	Ray Cochrane	Ian Balding	2:05.89
1993	Athens Belle	Willie Carson	Roger Charlton	2:07.90
1994	Wind in Her Hair	Richard Hills	John Hills	2:08.78
1995	Spout	Pat Eddery	Roger Charlton	2:11.60
1996	Mezzogiorno	Ray Cochrane	Geoff Wragg	2:12.00
1997	Yashmak	Kieren Fallon	Henry Cecil	2:10.84
1998	Jibe	Kieren Fallon	Henry Cecil	2:06.43
1999	Nasheed	Richard Hills	John Dunlop	2:13.02
2000	Whitefoot	Frankie Dettori	Gerard Butler	2:08.44
2001	Santa Isobel	Kieren Fallon	Ian Balding	2:19.27
2002	Monturani	Darryll Holland	Geoff Wragg	2:07.38
2003	Sun on the Sea	Frankie Dettori	Brian Meehan	2:09.43
2004	Rave Reviews	Kevin Darley	John Dunlop	2:09.16
2005	Eswarah	Richard Hills	Michael Jarvis	2:06.61
2006	Scottish Stage	Ryan Moore	Sir Michael Stoute	2:09.03
2007	Measured Tempo	Frankie Dettori	Saeed bin Suroor	2:08.46
2008	Clowance	Steve Drowne	Roger Charlton	2:09.76
2009	Apple Charlotte	Tom Queally	Henry Cecil	2:09.92
2010	Principal Role	Eddie Ahern	Henry Cecil	2:06.08
2011	Izzi Top	Dane O'Neill	John Gosden	2:06.94
2012	Momentary	Hayley Turner	Michael Bell	2:11.28
2013	Winsili	William Buick	John Gosden	2:11.74
2014	Volume	Richard Hughes	Luca Cumani	2:05.38
2015	Crystal Zvezda	Ryan Moore	Sir Michael Stoute	2:08.50
2016	We Are Ninety	Jim Crowley	Hugo Palmer	2:09.14
2017	Natavia	Ryan Moore	Roger Charlton	2:17.08
2018	Sea of Class	James Doyle	William Haggas	2:09.33
2019	Queen Power	Silvestre de Sousa	Sir Michael Stoute	2:09.47
	no race 2020 (Note: The 2020 running was cancelled because of the COVID-19 pandemic in the United Kingdom)
2021	Eshaada	Jim Crowley	Roger Varian	2:14.60
2022	Nashwa	Hollie Doyle	John & Thady Gosden	2:05.55
2023	Warm Heart	Ryan Moore	Aidan O'Brien	2:08.67
2024	Diamond Rain	William Buick	Charlie Appleby	2:06.94
2025	Qilin Queen	Hollie Doyle	Ed Walker	2:05.66
2026	Esna	Ryan Moore	Brian Meehan	2:06:94

== See also ==
- Horse racing in Great Britain
- List of British flat horse races
