= Balanchine (horse) =

American-bred Thoroughbred racehorse

- Racing silks of Maktoum Al Maktoum
- Sire: Storm Bird
- Grandsire: Northern Dancer
- Dam: Morning Devotion
- Damsire: Affirmed
- Sex: Filly
- Foaled: April 16, 1991
- Died: February 18, 2021 (age 29)
- Country: United States
- Colour: Chestnut
- Breeder: Swettenham Stud
- Owner: Robert Sangster; Godolphin; Sheikh Maktoum Al Maktoum
- Trainer: Peter Chapple-Hyam; Hilal Ibrahim; Saeed bin Suroor
- Record: 8: 4-2-0
- Earnings: £541,904

Major wins
- Oaks Stakes (1994); Irish Derby (1994).

Awards
- European Champion Three-Year Old Filly (1994); Timeform rating 131
- Last updated on March 3, 2008

Balanchine (16 April 1991 – 18 February 2021) was a Thoroughbred racehorse, bred in the United States and trained in the United Kingdom and Dubai. In a racing career which lasted from September 1993 until October 1995 she ran eight times and won four races. After winning both her races as a two-year-old Balanchine was narrowly beaten in the 1994 1000 Guineas before winning the Classic Epsom Oaks. She then recorded her most important success when defeating male opposition in the 1994 Irish Derby. After recovering from a life-threatening illness, she returned in 1995 but failed to win. Balanchine was one of the first important successes for Godolphin Racing.

== Background ==
Balanchine was a "big, handsome" chestnut mare, with a prominent white blaze and a long white sock on her near-hind leg. She was bred in the US by the Swettenham Stud, the breeding operation of her original owner, Robert Sangster. She was sired by the European Champion Two-Year-Old Storm Bird, out of the Affirmed mare Morning Devotion, making her a half-sister to the Sun Chariot Stakes winner Red Slippers. She was originally sent into training with Peter Chapple-Hyam at Manton.

== Racing career ==
=== 1993: two-year-old season ===
Balanchine ran twice as a juvenile in September 1993. Her reputation obviously preceded her, as she was made 1/2 favourite for a fifteen-runner maiden race at Salisbury which she "easily" won by three lengths. Two weeks later at Newbury she led all the way to win a minor stakes event by seven lengths at odds of 2/11 in "impressive" style.

Although she had not contested a Group race, she had established herself as a promising filly and attracted the attention of Maktoum Al Maktoum, who bought her privately and sent her to join his family's then experimental Godolphin team.

As a Godolphin horse, she was sent to spend the winter in Dubai under the care of Hilal Ibrahim. The idea was that the warmer conditions would allow horses to develop more quickly, giving them an advantage in the early part of the European Flat-racing season.

=== 1994: three-year-old season ===
On her return to England, Balanchine was sent straight for the 1000 Guineas without a "prep" race. She started as a 20/1 outsider despite the belief that her winter preparation had given her an advantage in terms of physical maturity. She finished strongly but failed by a short head to catch the Irish-trained filly Las Meninas who set a race record of 1:36.71. The winner was the property of Balanchine's original owner Robert Sangster.

Balanchine was then sent to Epsom for the Oaks Stakes, for which she was made 6/1 third favourite. The filly coped well with the soft ground and "driving rain", staying on strongly to win by two and a half lengths and become the first Classic winner for Godolphin. Sheikh Mohammed pointed out the significance of the Balanchine's performance: 'This experiment has obviously worked. We will now have to think about campaigning horses from Dubai all over the world.'

The decision was then taken to bypass the usual fillies' targets, and instead take on the colts in the Irish Derby at the Curragh. Balanchine justified her owners' belief, taking up the lead half a mile out and staying on strongly to win by four and a half lengths from The Derby runner-up King's Theatre. Her rider, Frankie Dettori, described her as "unbelievable". It was intended that she would be rested and then aimed at the Prix de l'Arc de Triomphe but less than three weeks later she contracted colic and became gravely ill. An emergency operation and intensive veterinary treatment saved her life, but there was no prospect of her racing again that season.

=== 1995: four-year-old season ===
Almost a year after her last start, Balanchine re-appeared as the odds-on favourite for the Prince of Wales's Stakes (then a Group Two race) at Royal Ascot but finished fifth of the six runners behind Muhtarram, being eased down in the closing stages.

In a slowly run Prix Foy at Longchamp her performance suggested that she might have been coming back to her best, as she finished a short-head second to the Prix de l'Arc de Triomphe winner Carnegie, after leading for most of the race. On her final start she made no impression in the Prix de l'Arc de Triomphe, finishing down the field behind Lammtarra. Her rider, Walter Swinburn, said that he was "always fighting a losing battle on Balanchine." She was then retired to stud.

== Race record ==
Date	Race	Dist (f)	Course	Class	Prize (£K)	Odds	Runners	Placing	Margin	Time	Jockey	Trainer
2 September 1993	EBF Quidhampton Maiden Stakes	7	Salisbury	M	5	1/2	15	1	3	1:27.42	John Reid	Peter Chapple-Hyam
17 September 1993	Starflight Aviation Stakes	7	Newbury		6	2/11	4	1	7	1:30.64	John Reid	Peter Chapple-Hyam
28 April 1994	1,000 Guineas	8	Newmarket-Rowley	1	112	20/1	15	2	Short Head	1:36.71	Frankie Dettori	Hilal Ibrahim
7 June 1994	Oaks	12	Epsom	1	147	6/1	10	1	2.5	2:40.37	Frankie Dettori	Hilal Ibrahim
26 June 1994	Irish Derby	12	The Curragh	1	331	5/1	9	1	3.5	2:32.70	Frankie Dettori	Hilal Ibrahim
20 June 1995	Prince of Wales's Stakes	10	Ascot	2	57	4/5	6	5	7	2:04.94	Frankie Dettori	Saeed bin Suroor
10 September 1995	Prix Foy	12	Longchamp	3	26	1/10	4	2	Short Head	2:35.60	Frankie Dettori	Saeed bin Suroor
1 October 1995	Prix de l'Arc de Triomphe	12	Longchamp	1	479	11/5	16	10	17.5	2:31.80	Walter Swinburn	Saeed bin Suroor

.

== Assessment ==
At the end of her three-year-old season Balanchine was given a Timeform rating of 131.

She was named European Champion Three-Year-Old Filly in the 1994 Cartier Racing Awards.

John Randall and Tony Morris, in their book "A Century of Champions" rated Balanchine the second best filly trained in Britain in the 1990s (behind Bosra Sham) and the fourteenth best British-trained filly of the Twentieth century.

The Group II Balanchine at Meydan Racecourse and the Group III Balanchine Stakes at the Curragh are both named in her honour.

== Breeding record ==
Balanchine has been bred to many of the world's leading stallions, including Gone West, Seeking The Gold and Elusive Quality but has never produced a runner of anything like her own ability. Her best offspring has probably been the minor winner and stakes placed Gulf News, sired by Woodman.

1999 Gulf News (USA) : Chestnut colt, foaled 29 March, by Woodman (USA) – won 2 races and placed twice including 2nd G2 Prix Niel, Longchamp; 3rd LR Prix Ridgway, Deauville from 9 starts in France 2001–2003

2000 Ibtecar (USA) : Bay colt, foaled 25 March, by Seeking The Gold (USA) – won 2 races and placed 5 times from 15 starts in England, Ireland and Dubai 2002–2006

2005 Oberlin (USA) : Chestnut gelding, foaled 16 February (6th foal), by Gone West (USA) – won once and placed 5 times from 21 starts on the flat and over hurdles in England 2007–2009

2007 Concurrence (USA) : Bay colt, foaled 1 February, by Elusive Quality (USA) – unplaced two starts in England 2010

2012 Balsamine (USA) : Bay filly, foaled 24 February, by Street Cry (IRE) – won twice and placed 3 times including 4th G3 Prix Penelope, Saint-Cloud from 5 starts in France 2014–15

2013 Barabau (USA) : Bay colt, foaled 2 April, by Bernardini (USA) – unplaced two starts to date in England 2015

== Death ==
Balanchine died of natural causes on 18 February 2021 at age 30.

== Pedigree ==
Pedigree of Balanchine (USA), chestnut mare, 1991
Sire Storm Bird (CAN) 1978	Northern Dancer; 1961	Nearctic	Nearco
Sire Storm Bird (CAN) 1978	Northern Dancer; 1961	Nearctic	Lady Angela
Sire Storm Bird (CAN) 1978	Northern Dancer; 1961	Natalma	Native Dancer
Sire Storm Bird (CAN) 1978	Northern Dancer; 1961	Natalma	Almahmoud
Sire Storm Bird (CAN) 1978	South Ocean; 1967	New Providence	Bull Page
Sire Storm Bird (CAN) 1978	South Ocean; 1967	New Providence	Fair Colleen
Sire Storm Bird (CAN) 1978	South Ocean; 1967	Shining Sun	Chop Chop
Sire Storm Bird (CAN) 1978	South Ocean; 1967	Shining Sun	Solar Display
Dam Morning Devotion (USA) 1982	Affirmed; 1975	Exclusive Native	Raise a Native
Dam Morning Devotion (USA) 1982	Affirmed; 1975	Exclusive Native	Exclusive
Dam Morning Devotion (USA) 1982	Affirmed; 1975	Won't Tell You	Crafty Admiral
Dam Morning Devotion (USA) 1982	Affirmed; 1975	Won't Tell You	Scarlet Ribbon
Dam Morning Devotion (USA) 1982	Morning Has Broken; 1974	Prince John	Princequillo
Dam Morning Devotion (USA) 1982	Morning Has Broken; 1974	Prince John	Not Afraid
Dam Morning Devotion (USA) 1982	Morning Has Broken; 1974	A Wind Is Rising	Francis S
Dam Morning Devotion (USA) 1982	Morning Has Broken; 1974	A Wind Is Rising	Queen Nasra (Family: 4-k)
