= Soul Sister (horse) =

Irish Thoroughbred racehorse

- Racing silks of Lady Bamford
- Sire: Frankel
- Grandsire: Galileo
- Dam: Dream Peace
- Damsire: Dansili
- Sex: Filly
- Foaled: 25 January 2020
- Country: Ireland
- Colour: Bay
- Breeder: Lady Bamford
- Owner: Lady Bamford
- Trainer: John & Thady Gosden
- Record: 4: 3-0-0
- Earnings: £388,421

Major wins
- Musidora Stakes (2023); Epsom Oaks (2023)

Soul Sister (foaled 25 January 2020) is an Irish-bred, British-trained Thoroughbred racehorse. She won her only race as a juvenile in 2022 and made good progress in the following year to win the Musidora Stakes and the Epsom Oaks.

== Background ==
Soul Sister is a bay filly with a large white star and a white sock on her right hind leg bred in Ireland by her owner Lady Bamford. She was sent into training with the father and son team of John and Thady Gosden at Clarehaven Stables at Newmarket, Suffolk.

Soul Sister was from the seventh crop of foals sired by Frankel, an undefeated racehorse whose other progeny have included Cracksman, Adayar, Soul Stirring and Hurricane Lane. Her dam, Dream Peace, was a high-class racemare who won the Prix de la Nonette and twice finished second in the Diana Stakes. She was a granddaughter of Truly Special, a mare whose other female-line descendants have included Moonstone, Naval Crown and US Army Ranger.

== Racing career ==
=== 2022: two-year-old season ===
Soul Sister began her racing career in a maiden race over one mile on soft ground at Doncaster Racecourse on 21 October when she was ridden by Robert Havlin and started at odds of 6/1 in a ten-runner field. She raced just behind the leaders before making steady progress in the last quarter mile before gaining the advantage in the final strides to win by a head from Doom.

=== 2023: three-year-old season ===
For her first run as a three-year-old, Soul Sister was stepped up to Group 3 class for the Fred Darling Stakes (a trial race for the 1000 Guineas) over seven furlongs at Newbury Racecourse on 22 April. Ridden by Frankie Dettori, who had announced that he would retire at the end of the season, she never looked likely to win and trailed home last of the twelve runners behind Remarquee, beaten more than twenty lengths by the winner. Her trainer explained that she was "unsuited by the soft going and would prefer a quicker surface". On 17 May the filly was moved up in distance for the Group 3 Musidora Stakes over 10 1/2 furlongs at York Racecourse and started the 18/1 outsider of the eight-runner field. Dettori settled Soul Sister towards the rear of the field before moving up to take the lead approaching the final furlong and won going away by four lengths from Novakai, with the favourite Infinite Cosmos half a length back in third place. Dettori commented "John was pretty confident, he said I’m not going to run her for no reason, but I didn’t expect her to do that. She travelled, quickened twice and felt really good."

On 2 June Soul Sister, with Dettori again in the saddle, was one of nine fillies to contest the 245th running of the Oaks Stakes over 1 1/2 miles at Epsom Racecourse. She started the 11/4 second choice in the betting behind the Irish-trained Savethelastdanceforme (Cheshire Oaks), while the other contenders included Eternal Hope (Lingfield Oaks Trial) and Caernarfon (Montrose Stakes). The field was reduced by one at the start when Soul Sister's stablemate Running Lion, the 5/1 third favourite, was withdrawn after becoming upset in the stalls. Soul Sister started well but was then restrained by Dettori and dropped back to the rear of the field as the 100/1 outsider Sea of Roses set the pace. Caernarfon and Savethelastdanceforme moved up to dispute the lead in the straight but Soul Sister made rapid progress on the outside, gained the advantage approaching the final furlong and won by 1 3/4 lengths despite hanging to the left in the closing stages. After the race John Gosden said

The York race was run steadily and she sprinted, and I was concerned she may not stay the mile and a half today, but she did. This is wonderful for the stud, they bred her, and getting horses to this level is hard enough, let alone winning a classic. Frankie said he was going to be stuck three, four wide so he dropped in, and let's face it, he had a lovely run down the outside. But she's come from virtually last and shown a lot of class to win and it's thrilling that she stayed a mile and a half.

== Pedigree ==
Pedigree of Soul Sister (IRE), bay filly, 2020
Sire Frankel (GB) 2008	Galileo (IRE); 1998	Sadler's Wells (USA)	Northern Dancer (CAN)
Sire Frankel (GB) 2008	Galileo (IRE); 1998	Sadler's Wells (USA)	Fairy Bridge
Sire Frankel (GB) 2008	Galileo (IRE); 1998	Urban Sea (USA)	Miswaki
Sire Frankel (GB) 2008	Galileo (IRE); 1998	Urban Sea (USA)	Allegretta (GB)
Sire Frankel (GB) 2008	Kind (IRE); 2001	Danehill (USA)	Danzig
Sire Frankel (GB) 2008	Kind (IRE); 2001	Danehill (USA)	Razyana
Sire Frankel (GB) 2008	Kind (IRE); 2001	Rainbow Lake (GB)	Rainbow Quest (USA)
Sire Frankel (GB) 2008	Kind (IRE); 2001	Rainbow Lake (GB)	Rockfest (USA)
Dam Dream Peace (IRE) 2008	Dansili (GB); 1996	Danehill (USA)	Danzig
Dam Dream Peace (IRE) 2008	Dansili (GB); 1996	Danehill (USA)	Razyana
Dam Dream Peace (IRE) 2008	Dansili (GB); 1996	Hasili (IRE)	Kahyasi
Dam Dream Peace (IRE) 2008	Dansili (GB); 1996	Hasili (IRE)	Kerali (GB)
Dam Dream Peace (IRE) 2008	Truly A Dream (IRE); 1991	Darshaan (GB)	Shirley Heights
Dam Dream Peace (IRE) 2008	Truly A Dream (IRE); 1991	Darshaan (GB)	Delsy (FR)
Dam Dream Peace (IRE) 2008	Truly A Dream (IRE); 1991	Truly Special	Caerleon (USA)
Dam Dream Peace (IRE) 2008	Truly A Dream (IRE); 1991	Truly Special	Arctique Royale (Family: 23)
