= Frankie Dettori =

Italian jockey (born 1970)

Frankie Dettori MBE
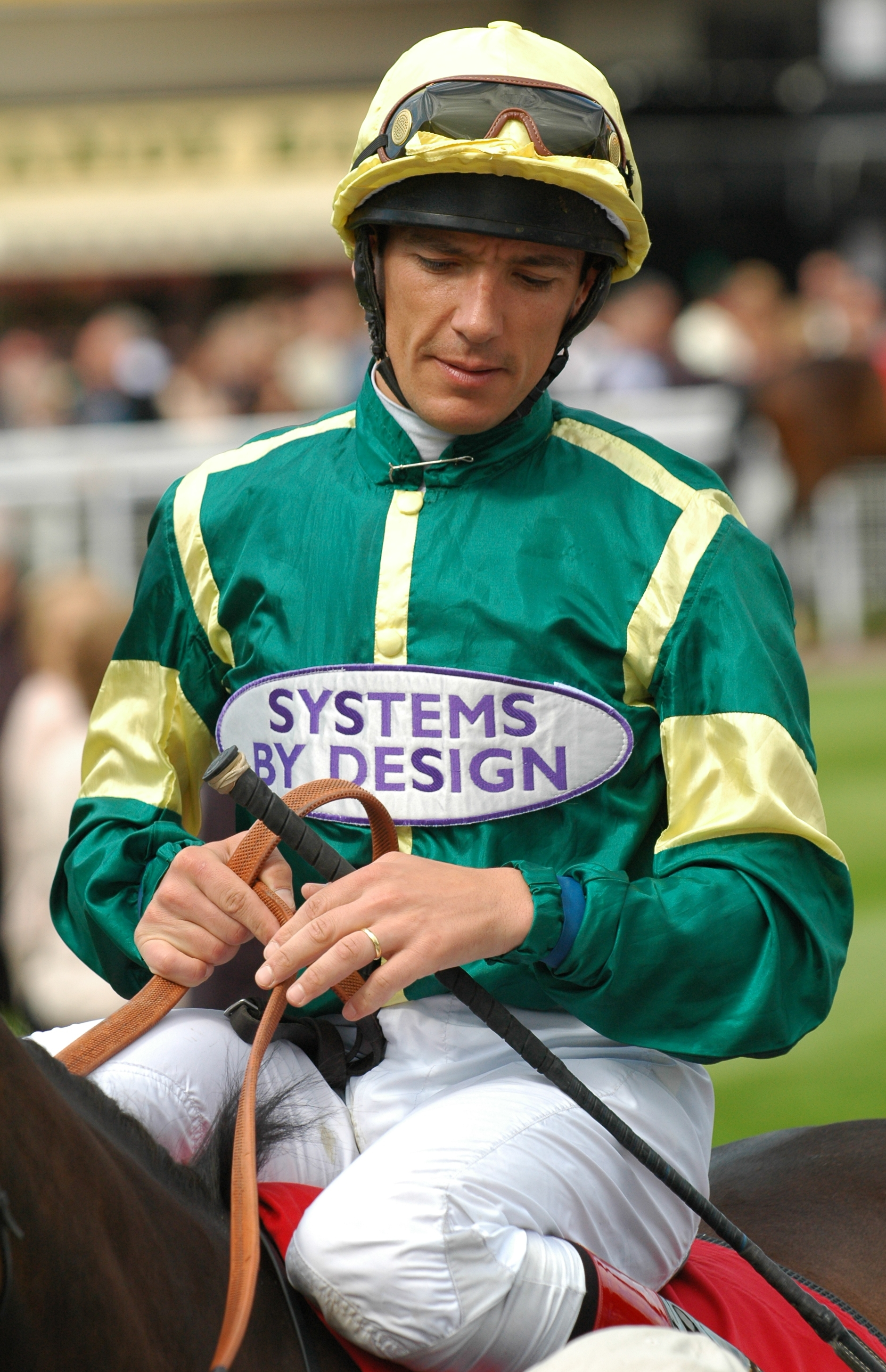
- Frankie Dettori in 2005

Personal information
- Born: 15 December 1970 (age 55) Milan, Italy
- Occupation: Jockey
- Height: 5 ft 4 in (1.63 m)
- Website: frankiedettori.com

Horse racing career
- Sport: Horse racing

Major racing wins
- List: 1,000 Guineas (1998), (2002), (2011), (2021); 2,000 Guineas (1996), (1999), (2016), (2023); Ascot Gold Cup (1992), (1993), (1998), (2004), (2012), (2018), (2019), (2020), (2023); Cheveley Park Stakes (2000), (2003); Coronation Cup (1996), (1997), (1999), (2001), (2023); Diamond Jubilee Stakes (1995), (2015); Derby (2007), (2015); Eclipse Stakes (1998), (2004), (2015), (2019); Falmouth Stakes (2008); Goodwood Cup (2019); Fillies' Mile (1990), (1997), (1999), (2000), (2010), (2011); Haydock Sprint Cup (1999); International Stakes (1996), (1997), (2001), (2004), (2007); King George VI and Queen Elizabeth Stakes (1995), (1998), (1999), (2004), (2017), (2019); King's Stand Stakes (1994); Lockinge Stakes (1994), (2000), (2008), (2014); Middle Park Stakes (1996), (1998), (2006), (2015); Nassau Stakes (2001), (2006); Nunthorpe Stakes (1993), (1995), (1998); Oaks (1994), (1995), (2002), (2017), (2019), (2021), (2023); Prince of Wales's Stakes (2001), (2002), (2011), (2019); Queen Anne Stakes (1990), (1997), (1998), (2003), (2004), (2007); Queen Elizabeth II Stakes (1990), (1996), (1999), (2007), (2010), (2017); Racing Post Trophy (2006), (2010); St. James's Palace Stakes (1997), (2018); St. Leger (1995), (1996), (2005), (2006), (2008), (2019); Sun Chariot Stakes (1992), (2023); Sussex Stakes (1991), (1999), (2001), (2007); Yorkshire Oaks (1994), (2011), (2017); Critérium de Saint-Cloud (2009); Grand Prix de Saint-Cloud (2005li); Poule d'Essai des Poulains (1995), (2000), (2005); Prix de l'Abbaye de Longchamp (1993), (1994), (2004); Prix de l'Arc de Triomphe (1995), (2001), (2002), (2015), (2017), (2018); Prix du Cadran (2006); Prix de Diane (2007), (2015); Prix de la Forêt (2006), (2014), (2022); Prix Ganay (1995), (2018); Prix d'Ispahan (1996), (2002); Prix Jacques Le Marois (1999), (2000), (2006), (2017), (2020), (2021), (2022); Prix Jean-Luc Lagardère (2007), (2011), (2021); Prix Jean Prat (1995), (1997), (1998), (2019); Prix Jean Romanet (2008), (2014); Prix du Jockey Club (1992), (2005), (2007); Prix Lupin (1995); Prix Marcel Boussac (1996), (2001); Prix Maurice de Gheest (1999); Prix Morny (1996), (2011), (2014), (2015); Prix du Moulin de Longchamp (2001), (2006); Prix de l'Opéra (2011); Prix de la Salamandre (1995), (1998); Prix Vermeille (2003), (2013); Bayerisches Zuchtrennen (1995), (2001); Deutsches Derby (1991); Deutschland-Preis (1997), (2002), (2010); Grosser Preis von Baden (1995), (2002), (2003); Mehl-Mülhens-Rennen (2010); Preis von Europa (2001), (2003), (2011); Centenary Sprint Cup (2002); Hong Kong Cup (2000), (2003), (2007); Hong Kong Mile (2004); Hong Kong Vase (1996), (2010); Queen Elizabeth II Cup (1996); Irish 2,000 Guineas (2000), (2005); Irish Champion Stakes (1998), (1999), (2001), (2002), (2012), (2015); Irish Derby (1994); Irish Oaks (2001), (2003), (2011), (2017), (2019); Irish St. Leger (1999); Matron Stakes (2001); National Stakes (2004); Phoenix Stakes (1992), (2018); Pretty Polly Stakes (1994); Tattersalls Gold Cup(1998), (2001); Täby Open Sprint Championship (1996); Derby Italiano (1999), (2009); Gran Criterium (2006); Gran Premio del Jockey Club (1993), (1996), (2001), (2005), (2009), (2011); Gran Premio d'Italia (1992); Gran Premio di Milano (1997), Sudan (2007); Oaks d'Italia (1997); Premio Parioli (2023); Premio Roma (1990), (1992), (1996), (2002), (2010); Premio Vittorio di Capua (1999), (2001), (2002), (2004), (2010); Canadian International Stakes (2000), (2004), (2012); E. P. Taylor Stakes (1995), (2008); A J Moir Stakes (2002); Dubai Turf (1997), (2021), (2022); Dubai Golden Shaheen (2007); Dubai Sheema Classic (1998), (2003), (2011); Dubai World Cup (2000), (2003), (2006) (2022); Godolphin Mile (1998), (1999), (2003), (2004), (2009), (2011), (2012); Jebel Hatta (2000), (2001); UAE Derby (2002), (2006); Al Quoz Sprint (2007); Beverly D. Stakes (2004); Breeders' Cup Classic (2008); Breeders' Cup Filly & Mare Turf (2006), (2016); Breeders' Cup Juvenile (2004); Breeders' Cup Juvenile Turf (2008), (2009), (2014); Breeders' Cup Mile (1994), (2018); Breeders' Cup Turf (1999), (2001), (2006), (2010), (2018); Japan Cup (1996), (2002), (2005); Japan Cup Dirt (2002); Singapore Gold Cup; Singapore Airlines International Cup (2002); King's Cup; Crown Prince Cup

Honours
- Honorary MBE (2001); British Racing Hall of Fame (2022)

Significant horses
- Golden Horn, Grandera, Singspiel, Daylami, Swain, Balanchine, Wilko, Raven's Pass, Electrocutionist, Dubai Millennium, Joshua Tree, Cape Verdi, Kazzia, Blue Bunting, Falbrav, Island Sands, Drum Taps, Kayf Tara, Authorized, Lammtarra, Lawman, Almutawakel, Marienbard, Refuse To Bend, Halling, Sakhee, Sulamani, Aljabr, Shamardal, Scorpion, Conduit, Ramonti, Olympic Glory, Bahamian Bounty, Shalaa, Ouija Board, Lochsong, Fantastic Light, Intikhab, Starborough, Lady Aurelia, Galileo Gold, Enable, Stradivarius.

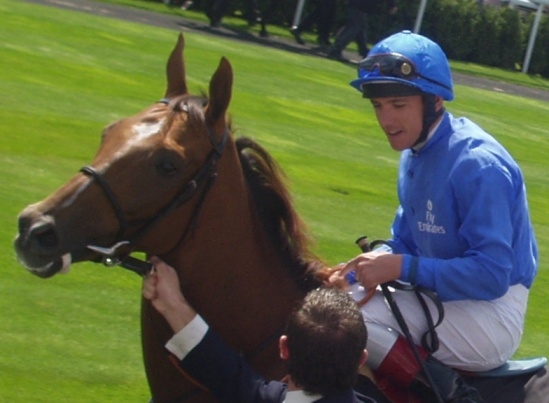
Frankie Dettori in the parade ring at 'Glorious Goodwood' in August 2004

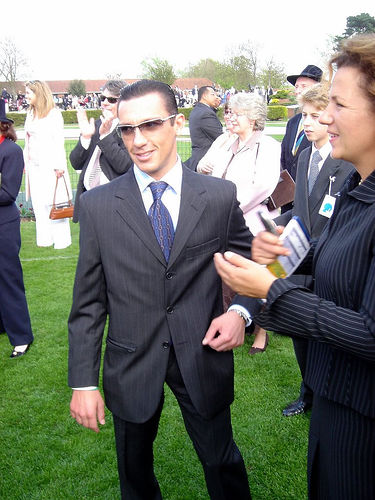
Frankie Dettori in the parade ring at Newmarket after riding in the 2000 Guineas 2005

Lanfranco "Frankie" Dettori MBE (Italian pronunciation: [laɱˈfraŋko detˈtoːri]; born 15 December 1970), is a retired Italian jockey who was based in England for a career spanning over 35 years. He was British flat racing Champion Jockey three times (1994, 1995 and 2004) and rode the winners of 288 Group 1 races including 23 winners of the British Classic Races. His most celebrated achievement was riding all seven winners on British Festival of Racing Day at Ascot Racecourse on 28 September 1996.

Born in Milan, Dettori is the son of Italian champion jockey Gianfranco Dettori. At the age of fourteen he went to Newmarket in England to work first as a stable lad, later as apprentice jockey and stable jockey in the yard of Luca Cumani, winning the British flat racing Champion Apprentice title in 1989. He was appointed stable jockey for Sheikh Mohammed's newly founded Godolphin Racing in 1994 and during the next eighteen years rode most of his worldwide big race victories in Godolphin's royal-blue colours. In 2000 Dettori and fellow jockey Ray Cochrane survived a light aircraft crash at Newmarket.

At the end of 2012, Dettori split from Godolphin Racing, and was suspended from riding for six months after failing a drugs test in France. From June 2013 to July 2018, he was the retained rider in Britain for Sheikh Joaan Al Thani's Al Shaqab Racing. After that, many of his winners including Enable and Stradivarius came from the stables of John Gosden. Dettori announced in December 2022 that 2023 would be his final year of professional riding. In December 2023 he moved to California to continue to race in the United States and on the international circuit. He retired from race riding in February 2026.

Outside racing he has worked in TV, appearing as a team captain on A Question of Sport from 2002 to 2004, and opened several Italian restaurants in partnership with chef Marco Pierre White.

== Early life ==
Dettori was born in Milan, Italy, on 15 December 1970. His father, Gianfranco Dettori, was a 13 times Italian Champion Jockey, who had won the British 2,000 Guineas in 1975 on the Henry Cecil trained Bolkonski and in 1976 on Wollow, also trained by Cecil. His mother Mara was a circus performer. Soon after his birth, Dettori's parents divorced. Until he was five, Dettori and his sister lived with their mother; after that they lived with their father and stepmother. As a child, Dettori was more interested in football than racing, but that changed when he was eight and his father bought him a palomino pony called Silvia. Aged nine, he rode Silvia in the Pony Derby at San Siro racecourse; he came last and fell off after the finishing line.

Dettori left school aged thirteen to work in racing stables and, in July 1985, left Italy for England to work in the yard of trainer Luca Cumani at Newmarket, Suffolk|Newmarket. It was at first a culture shock, as he had to adapt to a new language, and strange food and drink such as Heinz tinned ravioli and orange squash. Dettori returned to Italy for the winter of 1986/87 and his first win came on Turin racecourse in November 1986.

== Career ==
=== Early career in Newmarket ===
In the spring of 1987 Dettori was back in Cumani's yard in Newmarket and started to ride in Britain as an apprentice jockey. His first win in Britain came at Goodwood on 9 June 1987, riding Lizzy Hare to for Cumani. That season he rode eight winners, before spending the winter of 1987/88 in California, employed as a work rider for the trainer Richard Cross. (Note: A work rider is someone who rides racehorses out for exercise.) While in California Dettori was taught by jockey Ángel Cordero Jr. how to do a flying dismount, something that would later become his trademark. In 1989 Dettori became champion apprentice jockey with 75 wins and rode his first winner of a group race, Legal Case in the Select Stakes at Goodwood. In the spring of 1990 he took up a position of stable jockey to Cumani. That year he rode eight Group 1 winners for Cumani, and four for other trainers, including Henry Cecil. Markofdistinction provided him with his first win at Royal Ascot in June 1990 and his first Group 1 win in September. Still only nineteen, Dettori became the first teenager since Lester Piggott to win more than 100 races in a season, finishing on a total of 149, fourth in the champion jockey table.

The 1991 and 1992 seasons saw fewer winners as Cumani had lost many of his best horses when major owner the Aga Khan removed his horses from training in England. In 1992 Dettori won the Prix du Jockey Club on Polytain, trained by Antonio Spanu in France, and the Ascot Gold Cup on Drum Taps, trained by Lord Huntingdon. Before the beginning of the 1993 season he lost his position with Cumani, over his failure to let the trainer know that he was considering taking up the offer of a lucrative contract in Hong Kong. By now Dettori was enjoying a party lifestyle and in April 1993 was arrested in London for possession of cocaine, which put paid to his prospective contract to ride in Hong Kong. Dettori was given a police caution for the cocaine offence, after which he concentrated on racing with a renewed dedication, riding 149 winners as a free-lance in 1993. There was a second victory in the Ascot Gold Cup on Drum Taps, and two Group 1 wins on the sprint mare Lochsong, trained by Ian Balding.

=== The Godolphin years ===
In September 1993, Dettori was signed to ride Sheikh Mohammed's horses trained by Gosden. Determined to secure the 1994 jockey championship, Dettori took a break in Morocco to get fit for the beginning of the all-weather season in January and get a head start on jockeys who only rode on turf. By the end of the 1994 season, he had ridden 233 British winners and won the first of his three jockey championships. His first British Classic success came in the 1994 Epsom Oaks on Godolphin filly Balanchine, trained by Saeed bin Suroor. Three weeks later the pair won the Irish Derby at The Curragh. In November 1994 Sheikh Mohammed's Cumani-trained Barathea provided Dettori with the first of his fourteen Breeders' Cup victories, winning the Breeders' Cup Mile. When Sheikh Mohammed set up the Godolphin international racing operation in 1994, Dettori, who had already ridden the Sheikh's horses in training with Gosden, was signed as retained jockey. The association would last eighteen years.

In 1995, Dettori was again champion jockey. Godolphin horses provided him with two more British Classic victories, Moonshell and Classic Cliche in the St Leger, while Lammtarra won the King George VI and Queen Elizabeth Stakes and the Prix de l'Arc de Triomphe. His St Leger win also provided him with his 1000th win in Britain.

On 28 September 1996 Dettori achieved a remarkable feat when he "went through the card", riding all seven winners at the British Festival of Racing (a precursor to British Champions Day) at Ascot racecourse. Dettori's 25,095-1 "magnificent seven" made him a household name and cost the betting industry an estimated £40 million. Twenty years later he would refer to it as his greatest sporting achievement.

On 1 June 2000, Dettori and fellow jockey Ray Cochrane were aboard a Piper Seneca plane which crashed on takeoff at Newmarket on its way to Goodwood in Sussex. Cochrane pulled Dettori from the wreckage but was unable to save pilot Patrick Mackey. Dettori suffered a broken ankle and facial cuts and spent several days in Addenbrooke's Hospital

After the plane crash, Dettori devoted less time to racing and more time to TV work on A Question of Sport. Although still riding successfully in the big races, he had in his own words become a part-timer. It was his wife who encouraged him to get back to riding in the small meetings as well as the major ones, and, in 2004, he won the jockeys' championship for a third time.

By 2007 Dettori had amassed eleven victories in British Classics (two in the 2000 Guineas, two in the 1000 Guineas, three in the Oaks and four in the St Leger) but a win in the Derby still eluded him after fourteen attempts. On 2 June 2007, released for the occasion from his contractual duties with Godolphin, he rode the favourite Authorized to a comfortable win for trainer Peter Chapple-Hyam. "I had to pinch myself crossing the line to make sure it was real not a dream", said Dettori.

Dettori's relationship with Godolphin was under increasing strain by 2012. In the spring of that year, Godolphin hired two younger jockeys, Mickaël Barzalona and Silvestre de Sousa, to ride alongside Dettori who found himself "jocked off" in big races. In October, Dettori rode Camelot for Godolphin's rival Coolmore Stud in the Prix de l'Arc de Triomphe and later the same month Godolphin announced that they would not be continuing Dettori's retainer the following year.

=== Later career ===
In December 2012 Dettori was given a six-month suspension after a failed a drug test in France in September. He admitted to having used cocaine, telling Clare Balding in an interview on Channel 4:"Things were going bad, I was depressed and I guess a moment of weakness and I fell for it and I've only got myself to blame". Following his six-month ban, Dettori made his racing comeback at Epsom on 31 May 2013. A week later, he won his first race since the ban, riding Asian Trader at Sandown. That month he was signed as retained rider in Britain for Sheikh Joaan Al Thani's Al Shaqab Racing. In 2016, Dettori rode Galileo Gold to win the 2000 Guineas for Al Shaqab Racing.

Dettori also re-established an association with trainer Gosden, notably securing victories on Golden Horn in the 2015 Derby and Enable in the 2017 Oaks and Prix de l'Arc de Triomphe. In 2018 Dettori decided to end his formal association with Al Shaqab Racing in order to concentrate on riding for Gosden. He rode the Juddmonte-owned Enable to further Group 1 victories, including another win in the Prix de l'Arc de Triomphe. Also in the colours of Juddmonte, stayer Stadivarius provided Dettori with three consecutive Ascot Gold Cup wins in 2018–2020. The trainer and jockey fell out over Dettori's rides at 2022 Royal Ascot, in particular that on Stradivarius when he was beaten a length into third place in the Gold Cup.

On 17 December 2022 during an interview with ITV Racing, Dettori announced that he would be retiring at the end of the following season, with his final rides likely to come at the November 2023 Breeders' Cup meeting at Santa Anita Park in California. He said that, having just turned 52, he wanted to retire while he was still getting good horses to ride in the big races. By the time he announced his forthcoming retirement, he had ridden 282 Group/Grade 1 winners worldwide, including 21 British Classic winners.

Dettori started his 2023 farewell tour with a ten-week stint in the United States, based at Santa Anita Park for its winter racing. A treble on the first day of the meeting included a win in the San Antonio Stakes on 2022 Dubai World Cup winner Country Grammer, trained by Bob Baffert. On a return to Dubai in March, Country Grammer could manage only seventh place in the Dubai World Cup, but on the same evening Dettori won the Group 1 Dubai Turf on the Gosden-trained Lord North.

During the summer of 2023, Dettori added to his tally of British Group 1 and Classic races, winning the 2000 Guineas on 6 May on Chaldean for trainer Andrew Balding and then achieving a double at Epsom on 2 June with wins in the Coronation Cup on Emily Upjohn and the Oaks on Soul Sister (horse), both trained by John and Thady Gosden.

In October 2023, Dettori announced that, instead of retiring, he would be moving to California and continuing to race in the United States and on the international circuit. On what was scheduled to be his final day of racing in Britain, Dettori rode Trawlerman to victory in the Long Distance Cup before completing a double on King of Steel in the Champion Stakes at Ascot on British Champions' Day on 21 October 2023. He also watched as Queen Camilla unveiled a statue of him at the racecourse. In December 2023 he moved to California and had ridden six winners within two weeks. His first Grade 1 win of his stay in California came in March 2024, when he rode Newgate, trained by Baffert, to victory in the Santa Anita Handicap.

In November 2025, Dettori announced that his rides in the 2025 Breeders' Cup would be his last in the US, and that he would retire after a tour of South America. He rode winners in Argentina and Uruguay before ending his career with a win on Bet You Can in the Grande Premio Estado do Rio De Janeiro, at the Gavea racecourse in Rio de Janeiro on 1 February 2026. "Racing has been my life", he said.

== TV appearances ==
Dettori was the subject of This Is Your Life in 1998. Between September 2002 and September 2004 he was one of the team captains on the BBC programme A Question of Sport. During his suspension from racing in 2013, Dettori became a housemate on the eleventh series of Celebrity Big Brother and was the fifth person to be evicted from the house. In November–December 2023, Dettori appeared on the twenty-third series of I'm a Celebrity...Get Me Out of Here!, entering as a late arrival alongside Tony Bellew. He spent 12 days in the camp before becoming the first contestant to be voted off. In 2025, he featured in the Netflix documentary Race for the Crown.

== Restaurants ==
In 2004 Dettori teamed up with chef Marco Pierre White to open a chain of several Italian restaurants called Frankie's Bar and Grill. He has also published a cookbook and produced a line of frozen Italian foods.

== Personal life ==
Dettori married Catherine Allen on 20 July 1997 at the Catholic Church in Newmarket. The couple lived in Stetchworth near Newmarket for 17 years and have five children. In 2006, Dettori added his voice to a campaign to raise jockeys' weights, saying: "I am 5 ft 4 in [1.63 m] and weigh 9 st 9 lb [61 kg; 135 lb] but I have to sometimes go down to 8 st 6 lb [54 kg; 118 lb]." He has also spoken about bulimia and using laxatives and diuretics to keep his weight down. Dettori was awarded an honorary MBE for services to racing in the 2001 New Year Honours (honorary as he is a foreign national). In 2011 Dettori was awarded an honorary Doctor of Science at Anglia Ruskin University.

Dettori made use of an alleged tax avoidance scheme devised by Paul Baxendale-Walker, which led to a legal dispute with HMRC. His anonymity in the case was lifted by a court order in December 2024. In March 2025, Dettori announced that he had filed for bankruptcy as his financial advisors had failed to reach an agreement with HMRC. The bankruptcy was due to be discharged after a year, but in March 2026 the court extended it for a further year as Dettori had failed to disclose all his assets, including properties abroad. The judge said that criminal sanctions were a possibility.

On 1 July 2026, Dettori was involved in a car accident near Newmarket and was taken to hospital with several broken ribs and a broken thumb.

== Major wins ==
Dettori won the following world-wide Group/Grade 1 races.

(United Kingdom) Great Britain

- 1,000 Guineas – (4) – Cape Verdi (1998), Kazzia (2002), Blue Bunting (2011), Mother Earth (2021)
- 2,000 Guineas – (4) – Mark of Esteem (1996), Island Sands (1999), Galileo Gold (2016), Chaldean (2023)
- Ascot Gold Cup – (9) – Drum Taps (1992, 1993), Kayf Tara (1998), Papineau (2004), Colour Vision (2012), Stradivarius (2018, 2019, 2020), Courage Mon Ami (2023).
- British Champions Sprint Stakes - (5) - Chummy's Favourite (1989), Diffident (1996), Sampower Star (2000), Acclamation (2003), Kinross (2022)
- British Champions Fillies' and Mares' Stakes – (3) – Journey (2016), Star Catcher (2019), Emily Upjohn (2022)
- Champion Stakes – (3) – Cracksman (2017, 2018), King Of Steel (2023)
- Cheveley Park Stakes – (2) – Regal Rose (2000), Carry On Katie (2003)
- Commonwealth Cup – (2) – Advertise (2019), Campanelle (2021)
- Coronation Cup – (6) – Swain (1996), Singspiel (1997), Daylami (1999), Mutafaweq (2001), Cracksman (2018), Emily Upjohn (2023)
- Coronation Stakes – (2) – Alpine Star (2020), Inspiral (2022)
- Dewhurst Stakes – (3) – Too Darn Hot (2018), St Mark's Basilica (2020), Chaldean (2022)
- Diamond Jubilee Stakes – (2) – So Factual (1995), Undrafted (2015)
- Derby – (2) – Authorized (2007), Golden Horn (2015)
- Eclipse Stakes – (4) – Daylami (1998), Refuse To Bend (2004), Golden Horn (2015), Enable (2019)
- Falmouth Stakes – (1) – Nahoodh (2008)
- Fillies' Mile – (7) – Shamshir (1990), Glorosia (1997), Teggiano (1999), Crystal Music (2000), White Moonstone (2010), Lyric of Light (2011), Inspiral (2021)
- Goodwood Cup – (5) – Kayf Tara (1999), Schiaparelli (2009), Opinion Poll (2011), Stradivarius (2019, 2020)
- Haydock Sprint Cup – (1) – Diktat (1999)
- International Stakes – (6) – Halling (1996), Singspiel (1997), Sakhee (2001), Sulamani (2004), Authorized (2007), Mostahdaf (2023)
- King George VI and Queen Elizabeth Stakes – (7) – Lammtarra (1995), Swain (1998),Daylami (1999), Doyen (2004), Enable (2017, 2019, 2020)
- Lockinge Stakes – (5) – Emperor Jones (1994), Aljabr (2000), Creachadoir (2008), Olympic Glory (2014), Palace Pier (2021)
- Middle Park Stakes – (4) – Bahamian Bounty (1996), Lujain (1998), Dutch Art (2006), Shalaa (2015)
- Nassau Stakes – (2) – Lailani (2001),Ouija Board (2006)
- Nunthorpe Stakes – (3) – Lochsong (1993), So Factual (1995), Lochangel (1998)
- Oaks – (7) – Balanchine (1994), Moonshell (1995), Kazzia (2002), Enable (2017), Anapurna (2019), Snowfall (2021), Soul Sister (2023)
- Prince of Wales's Stakes – (4) – Fantastic Light (2001),Grandera (2002), Rewilding (2011), Crystal Ocean (2019)
- Queen Anne Stakes – (7) – Markofdistinction (1990), Allied Forces (1997), Intikhab (1998), Dubai Destination (2003), Refuse to Bend (2004), Ramonti (2007), Palace Pier (2021)
- Queen Elizabeth II Stakes – (6) – Markofdistinction (1990), Mark of Esteem (1996), Dubai Millennium (1999), Ramonti (2007), Poet's Voice (2010), Persuasive (2017)
- Racing Post Trophy – (2) – Authorized (2006), Casamento (2010)
- St. James's Palace Stakes – (4) – Starborough (1997), Galileo Gold (2016),Without Parole (2018), Palace Pier (2020)
- St. Leger – (6) – Classic Cliche (1995), Shantou (1996), Scorpion (2005), Sixties Icon (2006), Conduit (2008), Logician (2019)
- Sun Chariot Stakes – (2) – Red Slippers (1992), Inspiral (2023)
- Sussex Stakes – (5) – Second Set (1991), Aljabr (1999), Noverre (2001), Ramonti (2007), Too Darn Hot (2019)
- Yorkshire Oaks – (4) – Only Royale (1994), Blue Bunting (2011), Enable (2017, 2019)

Dettori won every Group 1 race in the UK, except for the July Cup. He won the 1994 King's Stand Stakes on Lochsong when it was a Group 2 race; It was subsequently promoted to a Group 1 race.

France

- Critérium International – (2) – Alson (2019), Angel Bleu (2021)
- Critérium de Saint-Cloud – (1) – Passion for Gold (2009)
- Grand Prix de Saint-Cloud – (2) – Alkaased (2005), Coronet (2019)
- Poule d'Essai des Poulains – (3) – Vettori (1995), Bachir (2000), Shamardal (2005)
- Prix de l'Abbaye de Longchamp – (3) – Lochsong (1993, 1994), Var (2004)
- Prix de l'Arc de Triomphe – (6) – Lammtarra (1995), Sakhee (2001), Marienbard (2002), Golden Horn (2015), Enable (2017, 2018)
- Prix du Cadran – (1) – Sergeant Cecil (2006)
- Prix de Diane – (2) – West Wind (2007), Star Of Seville (2015)
- Prix de la Forêt – (3) – Caradak (2006), Olympic Glory (2014), Kinross (2022)
- Prix Ganay – (2) – Pelder (1995), Cracksman (2018)
- Prix d'Ispahan – (2) – Halling (1996), Best of the Bests (2002)
- Prix Jacques Le Marois – (8) – Dubai Millennium (1999), Muhtathir (2000), Librettist (2006), Al Wukair (2017), Palace Pier (2020, 2021), Inspiral (2022, 2023)
- Prix Jean-Luc Lagardère – (3) – Rio de la Plata (2007), Dabirsim (2011), Angel Bleu (2021)
- Prix Jean Prat – (4) – Torrential (1995), Starborough (1997), Almutawakel (1998), Too Darn Hot (2019)
- Prix Jean Romanet – (3) – Folk Opera (2008), Ribbons (2014), Coronet (2019)
- Prix du Jockey Club – (3) – Polytain (1992), Shamardal (2005), Lawman (2007)
- Prix Lupin – (1) – Flemensfirth (1995)
- Prix Marcel Boussac – (2) – Ryafan (1996), Sulk (2001)
- Prix Maurice de Gheest – (2) – Diktat (1999), Advertise (2019)
- Prix Morny – (6) – Bahamian Bounty (1996), Dabirsim (2011), The Wow Signal (2014), Shalaa (2015), Lady Aurelia (2016), Campanelle (2020)
- Prix du Moulin de Longchamp – (2) – Slickly (2001), Librettist (2006)
- Prix de l'Opéra – (1) – Nahrain (2011)
- Prix de la Salamandre – (2) – Lord of Men (1995), Aljabr (1998)
- Prix de Royallieu – (6) – Annaba (1996), Tulipa (1997), Moon Queen (2001), Anna Pavlova (2007), Anapurna (2019), Loving Dream (2021)
- Prix Vermeille – (3) – Mezzo Soprano (2003), Trêve (2013), Star Catcher (2019)

Qatar

- Emir's Trophy (Local Group 1) – (2) – Dubday (2014), Dubday (2015)
- Qatar Gold Trophy (Local Group 1) – (1) – Dubday (2015)

Germany

- Bayerisches Zuchtrennen – (3) – Germany (1995), Kutub (2001), Elliptique (2016)
- Deutsches Derby – (1) – Temporal (1991)
- Deutschland-Preis – (3) – Luso (1997), Marienbard (2002), Campanologist (2010)
- Grosser Preis von Baden – (3) – Germany (1995), Marienbard (2002), Mamool (2003)
- Preis der Diana – (1) – Miss Yoda (2020)
- Preis von Europa – (3) – Kutub (2001), Mamool (2003), Campanologist (2011)

Hungary

- Kincsem Dij (Local Group 1) – (1) – Splendent (2023)

Macau

- Macau Derby – (1) – Royal Treasure (2002)

Hong Kong

- Centenary Sprint Cup – (1) – Firebolt (2002)
- Hong Kong Cup – (3) – Fantastic Light (2000), Falbrav (2003), Ramonti (2007)
- Hong Kong Mile – (1) – Firebreak (2004)
- Hong Kong Vase – (2) – Luso (1996), Mastery (2010)
- Queen Elizabeth II Cup – (1) – Overbury (1996)

Trinidad and Tobago

- Caribbean Champion Stakes – (1) – Bigman in Town (2014)

South Africa

- Cape Derby – (1) – Edict of Nantes (2017)

(Republic of Ireland) Ireland

- Irish 2,000 Guineas – (2) – Bachir (2000), Dubawi (2005)
- Irish Champion Stakes – (6) – Swain (1998), Daylami (1999), Fantastic Light (2001), Grandera (2002), Snow Fairy (2012), Golden Horn (2015)
- Irish Derby – (1) – Balanchine (1994)
- Irish Oaks – (5) – Lailani (2001), Vintage Tipple (2003), Blue Bunting (2011), Enable (2017), Star Catcher (2019)
- Irish St. Leger – (2) – Kayf Tara (1999), Wicklow Brave (2016)
- Matron Stakes – (1) – Independence (2001)
- National Stakes – (1) – Dubawi (2004)
- Phoenix Stakes – (2) – Pips Pride (1992), Advertise (2018)
- Pretty Polly Stakes – (1) – Del Deya (1994)
- Tattersalls Gold Cup – (2) – Daylami (1998), Fantastic Light (2001)

Italy

- Derby Italiano (Downgraded to Group 2 in 2009) – (2) – Mukhalif (1999)
- Gran Criterium – (1) – Kirklees (2006)
- Gran Premio del Jockey Club – (6) – Misil (1993), Shantou (1996), Kutub (2001), Cherry Mix (2005), Schiaparelli (2009), Campanologist (2011)
- Gran Premio d'Italia – (1) – Masad (1992)
- Gran Premio di Milano (Downgraded to Group 2 in 2016) – (3) – Shantou (1997), Sudan (2007)
- Oaks d'Italia – (1) – Nicole Pharly (1997)
- Premio Roma – (5) – Legal Case (1990), Misil (1992), Flemensfirth (1996), Sunstrach (2002), Rio De La Plata (2010)
- Premio Vittorio di Capua – (5) – Muhtathir (1999), Slickly (2001, 2002), Ancient World (2004), Rio De La Plata (2010)

Canada

- Canadian International Stakes – (4) – Mutafaweq (2000), Sulamani (2004), Joshua Tree (2012), Walton Street (2021)
- E. P. Taylor Stakes – (2) – Timarida (1995), Folk Opera (2008)
- Natalma Stakes - (1) - Wild Beauty (2021)
- Summer Stakes - (1) - Albahr (2021)

United Arab Emirates

- Al Maktoum Challenge, Round 3 – (5) – Dubai Millennium (2000), Street Cry (2002), Grandera (2003), Electrocutionist (2006), Jalil (2008)
- Dubai Turf – (3) – Tamayaz (1997), Lord North (2021, 2022, 2023)
- Dubai Golden Shaheen – (1) – Kelly's Landing (2007)
- Dubai Sheema Classic – (3) – Stowaway (1998), Sulamani (2003), Rewilding (2011)
- Dubai World Cup – (4) – Dubai Millennium (2000), Moon Ballad (2003), Electrocutionist (2006), Country Grammer (2022)
- Jebel Hatta – (2) – Siege (2000), Mahfooth (2001)
- Al Quoz Sprint – (1) – Great Britain (2007)

United States

- Beverly D. Stakes – (1) – Crimson Palace (2004)
- Breeders' Cup Classic – (1) – Raven's Pass (2008)
- Breeders' Cup Filly & Mare Turf – (3) – Ouija Board (2006), Queen's Trust (2016), Inspiral (2023)
- Breeders' Cup Juvenile – (1) – Wilko (2004)
- Breeders' Cup Juvenile Turf – (3) – Donativum (2008), Pounced (2009), Hootenanny (2014)
- Breeders' Cup Mile – (2) – Barathea (1994), Expert Eye (2018)
- Breeders' Cup Turf – (5) – Daylami (1999), Fantastic Light (2001), Red Rocks (2006), Dangerous Midge (2010), Enable (2018)
- Santa Anita Handicap - (1) - Newgate (2024)
- Jenny Wiley Stakes - (1) - Beaute Cachee (2024)
- Malibu Stakes - (1) - Raging Torrent (2024)
- Joe Hirsch Turf Classic - (1) - Rebel's Romance (2025)
- Metropolitan Handicap - (1) - Raging Torrent (2025)

Japan

- Japan Cup – (3) – Singspiel (1996), Falbrav (2002), Alkaased (2005)
- Japan Cup Dirt – (1) – Eagle Cafe (2002)

Singapore

- Singapore Gold Cup (Local Group 1) – (1) – Kutub (2002)
- Singapore Airlines International Cup – (1) – Grandera (2002)

Brazil

- Grande Premio Estado Do Rio De Janeiro – (1) – Bet You Can (2026)

== See also ==
- List of jockeys
